= Malcolm Grant (basketball) =

American basketball player (born 1998)

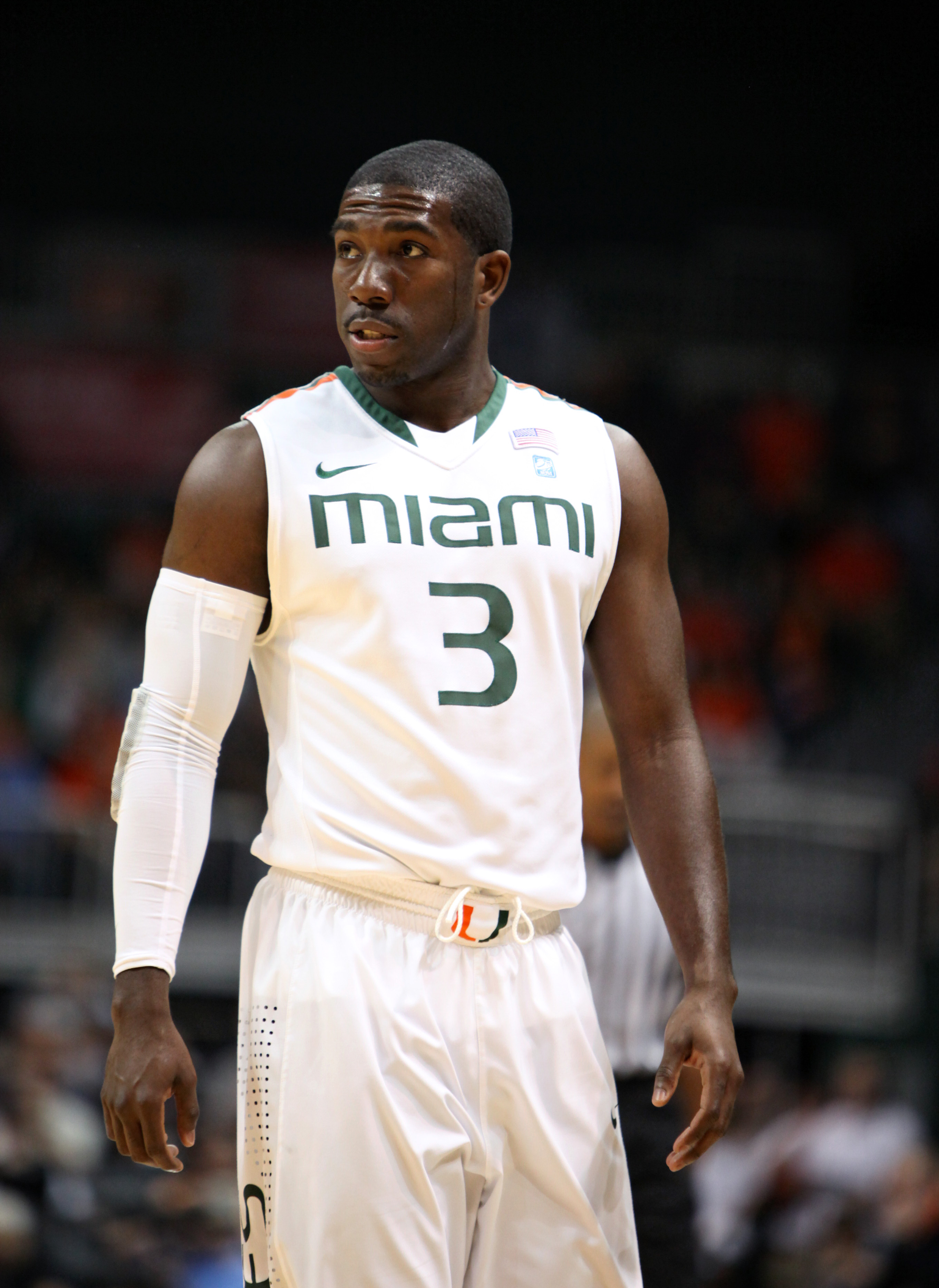
- Grant playing with the University of Miami in February 2011

Personal information
- Born: June 21, 1988 (age 38) Brooklyn, New York City, U.S.
- Listed height: 6 ft 0 in (1.83 m)
- Listed weight: 185 lb (84 kg)

Career information
- High school: Robeson (Brooklyn, New York); The Winchendon School (Winchendon, Massachusetts)
- College: Villanova (2007–2008); Miami (Florida) (2009–2012)
- NBA draft: 2012: undrafted
- Playing career: 2012–present
- Position: Point guard

Career history
- 2012: APOEL
- 2013: Wollongong Hawks
- 2014: Halifax Rainmen
- 2014: LF Basket Norrbotten
- 2015: Mississauga Power
- 2015–2016: Island Storm
- 2016–2017: Šentjur
- 2017: Nevėžis
- 2017–2018: Astana
- 2018: Zadar
- 2018–2019: Mornar
- 2019: SkyCop Prienai
- 2019–2020: Pieno žvaigždės Pasvalys
- 2020–2021: Shahrdari Qazvin
- 2020–2021: Ylli

Career highlights
- Third-team All-ACC (2011)

Malcolm Grant (born June 21, 1988) is an American professional basketball player who last played for Ylli of the Kosovo Superleague and Liga Unike. Born in Brooklyn, he played high school basketball for Robeson High School before going to The Winchendon School college prep school. He subsequently enrolled at Villanova University to play for the Wildcats. Following his freshman season at Villanova, he transferred to the University of Miami, where he played for the Miami Hurricanes.

After graduating from the University of Miami in 2012 with a degree in Sports Administration, Grant joined APOEL in Cyprus. He then moved to Australia to play for the Wollongong Hawks. In 2014, he joined the Halifax Rainmen in Canada to leave shortly afterwards to play for Swedish club LF Basket Norrbotten. In 2015, he had a second stint in Canada, this time to play for the Mississauga Power. He continued in Canada in the next season competing for the Island Storm. Following his stint in Canada, Grant took his talents to Europe playing for KK Šentjur and BC Nevėžis.

== Early life and career ==
Grant was born in Brooklyn on June 21, 1988, to Duncan and Mary Grant. He grew up with three siblings: Unique, the late Sayeed, and LeVar.

Grant played basketball under coaches Larry Major and Todd Myles at Robeson High School. In his senior season, Grant averaged 23.0 points, 2.6 rebounds and 2.0 assists per game to be named PSAL player of the year and New York Post's all-PSAL player of the year. He was also named in the 2006 regional Jordan Brand Classic. After graduating from Robeson, he attended a year of prep school in Winchendon School to qualify academically for college.

In the 2007 recruiting class, Grant was a three star recruit for Rivals.com, Scout.com, and 247Sports.com.

College recruiting
Name	Hometown	School	Height	Weight	Commit date
Malcolm Grant; PG	Brooklyn, NY	Winchendon	6 ft 0.625 in (1.84 m)	172 lb (78 kg)	Apr 4, 2006
Malcolm Grant; PG	Recruit ratings: Scout: Rivals: 247Sports:				
Overall recruit ranking: Scout: 23 (PG) Rivals: 25 (PG) 247Sports: 254, 53 (PG)
Note: In many cases, Scout, Rivals, 247Sports, On3, and ESPN may conflict in their listings of height and weight.; In these cases, the average was taken. ESPN grades are on a 100-point scale.; Sources: "Villanova 2007 Basketball Commitments". Rivals.; "2007 Villanova Commits". Scout.; "2007 Player Commitments – Villanova". ESPN.; "Scout.com Team Recruiting Rankings". Scout.; "2007 Team Ranking". Rivals.

== College career ==
=== Villanova ===
Grant gave a verbal commitment to Seton Hall, to play under coach Louis Orr. Orr's uncertain status as Seton Hall's head coach convinced Grant to change his commitment to Villanova. In his debut for Villanova he scored 16 points in an 86–64 win versus Stony Brook. On December 7, 2007, he scored 18 points, all in the last seven minutes of the game, to help Villanova upset LSU 68–67. He scored a season-high 23 points, in 18 minutes, against Rutgers. Following that game he played one minute in the following three games.

Grant saw limited playing time for the rest of the season after coach Jay Wright's decision to stop playing him. On April 4, 2008, he received a release, to explore transfer opportunities to other universities.

=== University of Miami ===
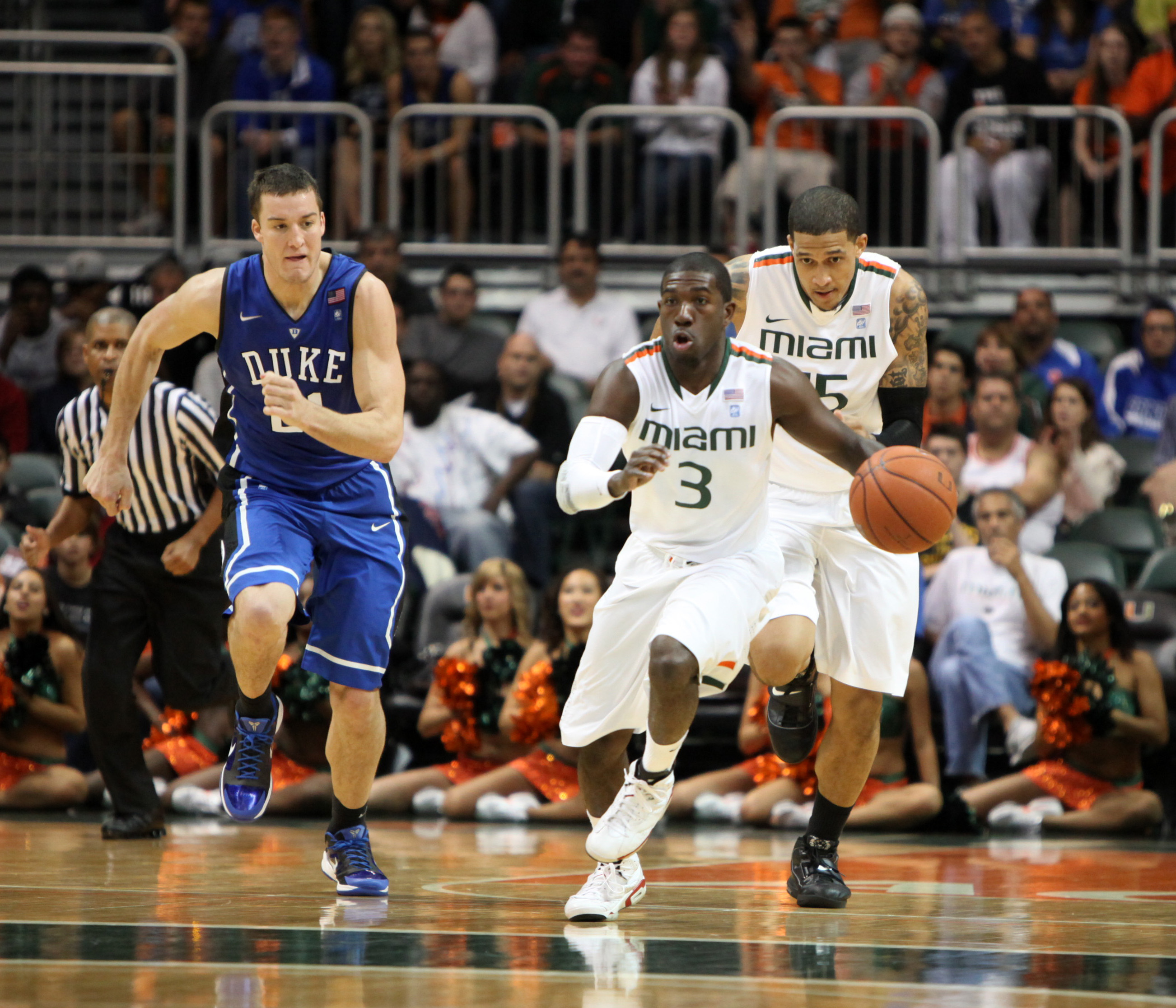
In 2010-11, Grant (#3) was named Third-team All-ACC as a player for the Miami Hurricanes

In April 2008, Grant transferred to the University of Miami.

He sat out the 2008–09 season due to NCAA transfer rules. His debut for Miami was in an 83–53 win over North Carolina Central, scoring 6 points, grabbing 4 rebounds and dishing 3 assists in 24 minutes. His season-high scoring effort was 18 points against UNC Wilmington, a feature he tied against Boston College. He played in all 33 games of the season, starting four of them, and led the team in assists, with 117. Throughout the season Grant had 9.6 points, 1.9 rebounds and 3.6 assists per game.

Grant started his second season at Miami by scoring 23 points, in the opening game of the season, to help his team win against Jacksonville 89–77. On November 24, 2010, Grant dished a career-high 9 assists and scored 10 points in Miami's 79–59 win against McNeese State. On December 4, 2010, Grant scored a career-high 26 points to help his team get past West Virginia 79–76. On January 23, 2011, he scored 23 points against NC State and was 5–5 on three-point field goals, tying the school record for three-pointers made. Grant started all 36 games of the season, setting a school record, and averaged 14.8 points, a team-high for the season, 1.8 rebounds, 2.6 assists and 0.9 steals per game in 32.4 minutes per game. For his performances in the 2010–11 season he was named in the All–ACC third team.

Grant opened his last season for Miami with 14 points, 4 rebounds and 2 assists, to help his team get past Tennessee Tech 69–58. He posted a season-high 22 points, against Ole Miss in his senior season. In the first 10 games of the season Grant averaged 15.1 points per game, but missed two games in January to attend his brother's funeral, who died of a heart attack. His brother's death affected his game. He went seven consecutive games without scoring double digits in February, and finished the season averaging 10.8 points, 2.1 rebounds, and 1.9 assists per game.

Grant graduated from the University of Miami with a degree in Sports Administration.

=== College statistics ===
Legend
GP	Games played	GS	Games started	MPG	Minutes per game
FG%	Field goal percentage	3P%	3-point field goal percentage	FT%	Free throw percentage
RPG	Rebounds per game	APG	Assists per game	SPG	Steals per game
BPG	Blocks per game	PPG	Points per game	**Bold**	Career high

Year	Team	GP	GS	MPG	FG%	3P%	FT%	RPG	APG	SPG	BPG	PPG
2007–08	Villanova	29	4	12.7	.390	**.466**	.841	.8	1.4	.1	.0	5.6
Did not play in the 2008–09 season due to NCAA transfer rules.
2009–10	Miami (Florida)	33	8	24.6	.393	.412	.756	1.9	**3.5**	.6	.1	9.6
2010–11	Miami (Florida)	**36**	**36**	**32.4**	**.418**	.423	**.853**	1.8	3.2	**.9**	.0	**14.8**
2011–12	Miami (Florida)	31	31	28.7	.339	.330	.803	**2.1**	1.9	.7	.0	10.8
Career		129	61	25.1	.386	.396	.818	1.7	2.6	.6	.0	10.4

== Professional career ==
After going undrafted in the 2012 NBA draft, Grant joined Cypriot club APOEL. He left APOEL in December 2012, averaging 7.0 points and 1.1 assists per game in 7 games. In January 2013 he signed for the Wollongong Hawks of the Australian League. He produced a season-high performance, scoring 21 points, against the Adelaide 36ers. In 11 games for the Hawks, Grant averaged 10.2 points, 1.6 rebounds and 2.3 assists per game. In January 2014 he joined Halifax Rainmen of the National Basketball League of Canada, to leave the club three weeks later to pursue an opportunity in Sweden. While with the Rainmen, Grant appeared in 7 games, averaging 13.0 points, 1.4 rebounds and 4.1 assists per game. On February 2, 2014, Grant joined LF Basket Norrbotten of the Swedish League, as a replacement for Keith McLeod. He left the club shortly afterwards, appearing in 3 games and averaging 8.0 points per game. In February 2015 Grant returned to Canada joining Mississauga Power. On February 24, 2015, he scored a season-high 28 points against the Halifax Rainmen. Grant started 6 of his 7 regular season games with the Power, averaging 17.4 points, 2.7 rebounds and 4.3 assists per game.

On October 5, 2015, Grant was signed by the Island Storm and would return to Canada for the 2015–16 season. He would join the Storm for training camp in early December. Team head coach Joe Salerno commented on Grant: "Since seeing him for the first time back in 2013, he has been a guy on my radar, someone I believed could be very, very good in our league if put in the right system and situation." Grant was also praised by Salerno for his experience in the ACC in his college years. In his debut for the Storm, Grant recorded a double-double, with 24 points and 10 assists. Grant started 23 of his 34 regular season games, led the Storm in assists and assists per game with 157 and 4.6 respectively, and posted averages of 11.6 points, 1.7 rebounds and 0.8 steals per game.

In September 2016, Grant signed a contract with KK Šentjur in Slovenia. Throughout the season, he appeared in 30 games for in the Slovenian League, averaging 13.3 points, 1.7 rebounds and 2.8 assists per game. Remarkably, he had over 50% field goal and three-point field goal percentage, and over 90% in free throw shooting. In August 2017, Grant signed a contract with Lithuanian league club BC Nevėžis. Grant refused to play in a game against BC Pieno žvaigždės, claiming that the club owed him months of wages; the claim was later confirmed by club officials. A few days after the incident, in early December 2017, Grant signed for BC Astana of the VTB United League, making his debut on 26 December against CSKA Moscow. Grant averaged 11.5 points, 2.5 assists and 1.4 rebounds per game in the VTB United League. On 7 August 2018, he signed with the Croatian team KK Zadar. In November 2018 he left Zadar. Two weeks later he signed for another club playing in the ABA League, the Montenegrin Mornar.

Grant spent the 2019–20 season with Pieno žvaigždės Pasvalys of the Lithuanian Basketball League. He averaged 6.2 points, 1.2 rebounds and 1.4 assists per game. On October 5, 2020, he signed with Shahrdari Qazvin of the Iranian Basketball Super League.

== The Basketball Tournament ==
Malcolm Grant played for Team Fancy in the 2018 edition of The Basketball Tournament. In 2 games, he averaged 7 points, .5 assists, and 1.5 rebounds per game. Team Fancy reached the second round before falling to Boeheim's Army.
