= 2010–11 Wake Forest Demon Deacons men's basketball team =

American college basketball season

2010–11 Wake Forest Demon Deacons men's basketball
- Conference: Atlantic Coast Conference
- Record: 8–24 (1–15 ACC)
- Head coach: Jeff Bzdelik (1st season)
- Assistant coaches: Jeff Battle; Rusty LaRue; Mark Pope
- Home arena: LJVM Coliseum

2010–11 ACC men's basketball standings
	Conf.				Overall
Team	W		L	PCT	W		L	PCT
No. 7 North Carolina	14	–	2	.875	29	–	8	.784
No. 3 Duke †	13	–	3	.813	32	–	5	.865
Florida State	11	–	5	.688	23	–	11	.676
Clemson	9	–	7	.563	22	–	12	.647
Boston College	9	–	7	.563	21	–	13	.618
Virginia Tech	9	–	7	.563	22	–	12	.647
Maryland	7	–	9	.438	19	–	14	.576
Virginia	7	–	9	.438	16	–	15	.516
Miami (FL)	6	–	10	.375	21	–	15	.583
NC State	5	–	11	.313	15	–	16	.484
Georgia Tech	5	–	11	.313	13	–	18	.419
Wake Forest	1	–	15	.063	8	–	24	.250
† 2011 ACC tournament winner As of March 27, 2011; Rankings from AP poll

The 2010–11 Wake Forest Demon Deacons men's basketball team represented Wake Forest University in the 2010–11 NCAA Division I men's basketball season. The team's head coach was Jeff Bzdelik, who was hired after the firing of Dino Gaudio. The team played its home games at Lawrence Joel Veterans Memorial Coliseum in Winston-Salem, North Carolina, and was a member of the Atlantic Coast Conference. They finished the season 8–24, 1–15 in ACC play and lost in the first round of the ACC tournament to Boston College.

== Previous season ==
They finished the 2009–10 season 20–11, 9–7 in ACC play and lost in the first round of the 2010 ACC men's basketball tournament. They received an at–large bid to the 2010 NCAA Men's Division I Basketball Tournament, earning a 9 seed in the East Region. They defeated No. 8 seed Texas in overtime in the first round before losing to No. 1 seed and AP No. 2 Kentucky in the second round.

== Recruiting ==
Wake Forest has a 5-man recruiting class for 2010.

College recruiting
Name	Hometown	School	Height	Weight	Commit date
Tony Chennault; Guard	Philadelphia, Pennsylvania	Neumann-Goretti High School (PA)	6 ft 1 in (1.85 m)	175 lb (79 kg)	May 8, 2008
Tony Chennault; Guard	Recruit ratings: Scout: Rivals: (90)				
Carson Desrosiers; Center	Windham, New Hampshire	Central Catholic High School (MA)	6 ft 11 in (2.11 m)	210 lb (95 kg)	Sep 23, 2009
Carson Desrosiers; Center	Recruit ratings: Scout: Rivals: (94)				
Travis McKie; Forward	Richmond, Virginia	John Marshall High School (VA)	6 ft 7 in (2.01 m)	195 lb (88 kg)	Apr 22, 2009
Travis McKie; Forward	Recruit ratings: Scout: Rivals: (94)				
Melvin Tabb; Forward	Raleigh, North Carolina	Enloe High School (NC)	6 ft 8 in (2.03 m)	225 lb (102 kg)	Jul 2, 2009
Melvin Tabb; Forward	Recruit ratings: Scout: Rivals: (94)				
J.T. Terrell; Guard	Charlotte, North Carolina	West Charlotte High School (NC)	6 ft 4 in (1.93 m)	175 lb (79 kg)	Jul 16, 2008
J.T. Terrell; Guard	Recruit ratings: Scout: Rivals: (95)				
Overall recruit ranking: Scout: 13 Rivals: 12 ESPN: 12
Note: In many cases, Scout, Rivals, 247Sports, On3, and ESPN may conflict in their listings of height and weight.; In these cases, the average was taken. ESPN grades are on a 100-point scale.; Sources: "2010 Team Ranking". Rivals.

== Roster ==
2010–11 Wake Forest Demon Deacons men's basketball team
Players
Coaches

Pos.	#	Name	Height	Weight	Year	Previous school	Hometown
G	1	Tony Chennault	6 ft 1 in (1.85 m)	170 lb (77 kg)	Fr	Neumann-Goretti High School	Philadelphia, Pennsylvania
G	2	Gary Clark (C)	6 ft 4 in (1.93 m)	195 lb (88 kg)	Sr	Montverde Academy	Sarasota, Florida
C	33	Carson Desrosiers	6 ft 11 in (2.11 m)	210 lb (95 kg)	Fr	Central Catholic High School (MA)	Windham, New Hampshire
F	41	Brooks Godwin	6 ft 5 in (1.96 m)	200 lb (91 kg)	Jr	Mount Tabor High School	Winston-Salem, North Carolina
G	11	C. J. Harris (C)	6 ft 2 in (1.88 m)	175 lb (79 kg)	So	Mount Tabor High School	Winston-Salem, North Carolina
G	43	Aaron Ingle	6 ft 0 in (1.83 m)	175 lb (79 kg)	Jr	Christ School	Weaverville, North Carolina
G	42	Spencer Jennings (I)	6 ft 0 in (1.83 m)	170 lb (77 kg)	So	Herbert Henry Dow High School	Midland, Michigan
F	45	Ryan Keenan	6 ft 4 in (1.93 m)	195 lb (88 kg)	Jr	Westbury Christian School	Bellaire, Texas
F	52	Denmore McDermott	6 ft 5 in (1.96 m)	235 lb (107 kg)	Sr	St. Paul's School for Boys	Baltimore, Maryland
F	30	Travis McKie	6 ft 7 in (2.01 m)	195 lb (88 kg)	Fr	John Marshall High School	Richmond, Virginia
F	25	Nikita Mescheriakov	6 ft 7 in (2.01 m)	215 lb (98 kg)	RS Jr	St. John's Prospect Hall	Minsk, Belarus
F	20	Ari Stewart	6 ft 7 in (2.01 m)	205 lb (93 kg)	So	Joseph Wheeler High School	Marietta, Georgia
G	0	J. T. Terrell	6 ft 4 in (1.93 m)	175 lb (79 kg)	Fr	West Charlotte High School	Charlotte, North Carolina
C	40	Ty Walker	7 ft 0 in (2.13 m)	220 lb (100 kg)	Jr	New Hanover High School	Wilmington, North Carolina

Head coach

- Jeff Bzdelik (Illinois-Chicago)

Assistant coach(es)

- Jeff Battle (Marshall)
- Rusty LaRue (Wake Forest)
- Mark Pope (Kentucky)

Legend

- (C) Team captain
- (S) Suspended
- (I) Ineligible
- (W) Walk-on
- Injured
- Current redshirt

Roster
Last update: 2011-02-08

== Schedule ==
Date time, TV	Rank^{#}	Opponent^{#}	Result	Record	Site (attendance) city, state
Exhibition
November 5*; 7:00 pm		Guilford	W 84–44	—	LJVM Coliseum; Winston-Salem, NC
Regular season
November 12*; 7:00 pm		Stetson	L 79–89	0–1	LJVM Coliseum (8,323); Winston-Salem, NC
November 15*; 7:00 pm, ESPNU		Hampton; 2010 NIT Season Tip-Off	W 63–56	1–1	LJVM Coliseum (7,570); Winston-Salem, NC
November 16*; 7:00 pm		VCU; 2010 NIT Season Tip-Off	L 69–90	1–2	LJVM Coliseum (8,119); Winston-Salem, NC
November 20*; 8:00 pm		vs. Elon	W 89–70	2–2	Greensboro Coliseum (2,380); Greensboro, NC
November 24*; 7:00 pm		Winthrop; 2010 NIT Season Tip-Off	L 74–83	2–3	LJVM Coliseum (3,014); Winston-Salem, NC
November 26*; 7:00 pm		Marist; 2010 NIT Season Tip-Off	W 81–59	3–3	LJVM Coliseum (3,418); Winston-Salem, NC
November 30*; 7:00 pm, ESPNU		Iowa; ACC–Big Ten Challenge	W 76–73	4–3	LJVM Coliseum (9,086); Winston-Salem, NC
December 4*; 1:00 pm		Holy Cross	W 75–64	5–3	LJVM Coliseum (9,043); Winston-Salem, NC
December 12*; 2:00 pm, MASN		vs. UNC Wilmington	L 69–81	5–4	Greensboro Coliseum (2,586); Greensboro, NC
December 15*; 7:00 pm, ESPNU		UNC Greensboro	W 69–67	6–4	LJVM Coliseum (8,340); Winston-Salem, NC
December 18*; 8:00 pm, CBS College Sports		at Xavier	L 75–83	6–5	Cintas Center (10,250); Cincinnati, OH
December 21*; 7:00 pm		Presbyterian	L 64–66	6–6	LJVM Coliseum (9,682); Winston-Salem, NC
December 29*; 7:00 pm		at Richmond	L 74–90	6–7	Robins Center (8,113); Richmond, VA
January 2*; 1:00 pm, FSN		Gonzaga	L 63–73	6–8	LJVM Coliseum (11,003); Winston-Salem, NC
January 5*; 7:00 pm		High Point	W 79–63	7–8	LJVM Coliseum (9,108); Winston-Salem, NC
January 8; 2:30 pm, ACC Network		at North Carolina State	L 69–90	7–9 (0–1)	RBC Center (16,591); Raleigh, NC
January 12; 8:00 pm, ACC Network		Maryland	L 55–74	7–10 (0–2)	LJVM Coliseum (10,307); Winston-Salem, NC
January 15; 8:00 pm, ACC Network		at Virginia Tech	L 65–94	7–11 (0–3)	Cassell Coliseum (9,847); Blacksburg, VA
January 19; 7:00 pm, ESPNU		at Georgia Tech	L 39–74	7–12 (0–4)	Alexander Memorial Coliseum (6,062); Atlanta, GA
January 22; 4:00 pm, ESPN		No. 5 Duke	L 59–83	7–13 (0–5)	LJVM Coliseum (14,107); Winston-Salem, NC
January 29; 4:00 pm, ACC Network		Virginia	W 76–71	8–13 (1–5)	LJVM Coliseum (11,783); Winston-Salem, NC
February 1; 7:00 pm		at Florida State	L 61–85	8–14 (1–6)	Donald L. Tucker Center (9,729); Tallahassee, FL
February 5; 1:00 pm, ACC Network		at Maryland	L 70–91	8–15 (1–7)	Comcast Center (17,950); College Park, MD
February 9; 7:00 pm, RSN		Miami	L 73–74	8–16 (1–8)	LJVM Coliseum (9,249); Winston-Salem, NC
February 13; 1:00 pm, ACC Network		North Carolina State	L 55–80	8–17 (1–9)	LJVM Coliseum (12,576); Winston-Salem, NC
February 15; 8:00 pm, ACC Network		at No. 19 North Carolina	L 64–78	8–18 (1–10)	Dean Smith Center (20,229); Chapel Hill, NC
February 19; 1:00 pm, ACC Network		Florida State	L 66–84	8–19 (1–11)	LJVM Coliseum (10,932); Winston-Salem, NC
February 22; 7:00 pm, ESPN2		Virginia Tech	L 62–76	8–20 (1–12)	LJVM Coliseum (9,482); Winston-Salem, NC
February 26; 4:00 pm, RSN		at Clemson	L 49–63	8–21 (1–13)	Littlejohn Coliseum (10,000); Clemson, SC
March 3; 8:00 pm, ESPN2		Georgia Tech	L 54–80	8–22 (1–14)	LJVM Coliseum (9,639); Winston-Salem, NC
March 6; 12:00 pm, ACC Network		at Boston College	L 68–84	8–23 (1–15)	Conte Forum (8,606); Chestnut Hill, MA
ACC tournament
March 10; 2:00 pm, ACC Network	(5)	vs. (12) Boston College; ACC First Round	L 67–81	8–24	Greensboro Coliseum (23,381); Greensboro, NC
*Non-conference game. ^{#}Rankings from Coaches' Poll. (#) Tournament seedings in parentheses. All times are in Eastern Time.

== Leaders by game ==
- Team Season Highs in **Bold**.

Game	Points	Rebounds	Assists	Steals	Blocks
Stetson	Terrell (26)	Stewart (10)	Harris (5)	McKie (2)	Walker (7)
Hampton	McKie (21)	Stewart (10)	Stewart/Terrell (5)	3 Tied (2)	Walker (6)
VCU	Stewart (18)	Harris (9)	Harris (4)	3 Tied (1)	Desrosiers (5)
Elon	McKie (22)	**McKie (15)**	**Harris (8)**	Harris/McKie (2)	McKie (2)
Winthrop	Clark (23)	Stewart (7)	Harris (7)	Harris (2)	Desrosiers/Walker (2)
Marist	McKie/Terrell (16)	McKie (11)	Harris (5)	**Terrell (3)**	**Walker (11)**
Iowa	**Terrell (32)**	Walker (8)	Clark/McKie (4)	**Walker (3)**	Walker (5)
Holy Cross	McKie (18)	McKie (11)	Harris (3)	Clark/McKie (2)	Walker (3)
UNC Wilmington	Clark (20)	Stewart (8)	Harris (6)	Clark (1)	Clark/Walker (1)
UNC Greensboro	McKie (16)	McKie (14)	Harris (4)	6 Tied (1)	Walker (4)
Xavier	Terrell (27)	McKie (11)	Stewart (4)	Walker (2)	Walker (8)
Presbyterian	Clark (14)	McKie (9)	Harris (4)	**Clark (3)**	McKie (2)
Richmond	McKie (19)	McKie (7)	Stewart (5)	Harris/Stewart (2)	Tabb/Walker (1)
Gonzaga	McKie (16)	Stewart/Walker (5)	Clark (4)	Stewart/Walker (2)	Walker (2)
High Point	Terrell (18)	McKie (6)	Clark/Harris (4)	**Harris (3)**	Walker (5)
NC State	Harris/Stewart (12)	Desrosiers (8)	Harris (4)	**Clark (3)**	Desrosiers/Walker (1)
Maryland	McKie (13)	McKie (10)	Clark (4)	Clark/Terrell (2)	Desrosiers (7)
Virginia Tech	Clark (16)	McKie (4)	Harris/Terrell (3)	Harris (2)	McKie (2)
Georgia Tech	Stewart (9)	Walker (8)	Terrell (2)	Harris (2)	Desrosiers (3)
Duke	McKie (12)	McKie (9)	Harris/Stewart (3)	McKie (2)	Walker (2)
Virginia	Harris (15)	McKie (9)	Harris (7)	McKie (2)	McKie (3)
Florida State	Clark (16)	McKie (6)	Chennault/Harris (3)	Walker (2)	Walker (6)
Maryland	Harris (17)	McKie (7)	3 tied (3)	McKie (1)	Desrosiers (4)
Miami	Harris (24)	McKie (7)	Harris/Terrell (4)	McKie (2)	Walker (4)
NC State	McKie (15)	McKie (7)	Harris (6)	4 tied (1)	Desrosiers (2)
North Carolina	Terrell (18)	McKie (9)	Harris (3)	5 tied (1)	Walker (4)
Florida State	McKie (20)	McKie (8)	Harris/Terrell (3)	Harris/McKie (2)	Desrosiers (3)
Virginia Tech	McKie (22)	McKie (9)	Harris (4)	Mescheriakov/Terrell (2)	3 tied (1)
Clemson	Mescheriakov (11)	McKie (12)	Clark (4)	**Clark (3)**	Desrosiers (2)
Georgia Tech	Clark (15)	McKie (5)	Chennault (4)	3 tied (2)	
Boston College	McKie (21)	McKie (6)	Chennault (4)	5 tied (1)	Desrosiers (3)
Boston College	McKie (16)	McKie (12)	Chennault (3)	Clark (2)	3 tied (1)
