= Pete Strickland =

American basketball coach (born 1957)

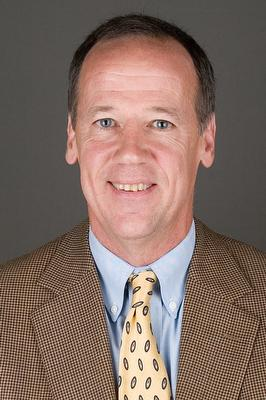

Biographical details
- Born: May 25, 1957 (age 69); Newburgh, New York, U.S.

Playing career
- 1975–1979: Pittsburgh

Coaching career (HC unless noted)
- 1980–1982: Neptune Basketball Club
- 1983–1984: Mt. St. Michael Academy (asst.)
- 1984–1987: DeMatha HS (asst.)
- 1987–1988: Ravenscroft HS
- 1988–1991: VMI (asst.)
- 1991–1994: Old Dominion (asst.)
- 1994–1998: Dayton (asst.)
- 1998–2005: Coastal Carolina
- 2005–2011: NC State (asst.)
- 2011–2013: George Washington (asst.)
- 2016–2018: Ireland
- 2021-: DeMatha HS (interim)

Accomplishments and honors

Awards
- Big South Coach of the Year (2000)

Pete Strickland (born May 25, 1957) is an American basketball coach and former college basketball player, currently the interim head coach of DeMatha Catholic High School.

== Playing career ==
Strickland attended DeMatha Catholic High School near Washington, D.C., where he played high school basketball for Morgan Wootten. He then attended the University of Pittsburgh where he played for the Pittsburgh Panthers (1975–1979). With the Panthers, Strickland was a three-year starter and two-year captain.

== Player-coach ==
In 1980, Strickland became player-coach of the Neptune Basketball Club based in Cork, Ireland. Strickland had been recruited to play in Ireland by an international scout who saw him play in an alumni game in Pittsburgh. In his first season as player-coach, Strickland's team went 18–0 and won the league title. In 1981, in preparation for the "Neptune International Basketball Tournament" to be held in March in Cork, Strickland recruited a number of his American friends to form a “Maryland All-Stars" team for the tournament, in exchange for round-trip airline tickets to Ireland. The All-Star team was eliminated from the tournament by a Cork-based team on a last-second three-pointer. That an Irish team was able to defeat an American team was credited with helping to increase the popularity of basketball in Ireland.

== Coaching career ==
Strickland coached at the high school level from 1983 through 1988. He then held assistant coaching roles at the college level from 1988 through 1998. In April 1998, he became head coach at Coastal Carolina University, a role he held until March 2005. His overall record in seven seasons with the Chanticleers was 70–127; the team was 42–56 in the Big South Conference.

Strickland was next an assistant coach at North Carolina State University, from 2005 until he was not retained by Mark Gottfried when Sidney Lowe resigned at the end of the Wolfpack's 2010–11 season. Strickland then served as an assistant coach at George Washington University, from 2011 through 2013.

Strickland was named head coach of the Ireland national team in November 2016. In the 2018 FIBA European Championship for Small Countries, Ireland finished in third place, with an overall record of 2–2 during the tournament.

== Head coaching record ==
Record table
Season	Team	Overall	Conference	Standing	Postseason
Coastal Carolina (Big South) (1998–2005)
1998–99	Coastal Carolina	7–20	4–6	4th	
1999–00	Coastal Carolina	10–18	7–7	3rd	
2000–01	Coastal Carolina	8–20	6–8	4th	
2001–02	Coastal Carolina	8–20	5–9	6th (tie)	
2002–03	Coastal Carolina	13–15	5–9	7th	
2003–04	Coastal Carolina	14–15	8–8	5th	
2004–05	Coastal Carolina	10–19	7–9	4th (tie)	
Coastal Carolina:		70–127 (.355)	42–56 (.429)		
Total:		70–127 (.355)			
