= 2010–11 Longwood Lancers men's basketball team =

American college basketball season

2010–11 Longwood Lancers men's basketball
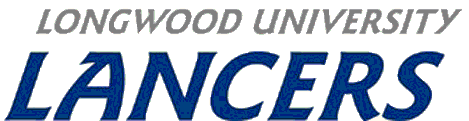
- Conference: Independent
- Record: 12–19
- Head coach: Mike Gillian (8th season)
- Assistant coaches: Bill Reinson (9th season); Doug Thibault (8th season); Tim Fudd (8th season)
- Home arena: Willett Hall

2010–11 NCAA Division I men's basketball independents standings
	Conf.				Overall
Team	W		L	PCT	W		L	PCT
New Orleans		–		–	16	–	6	.727
North Carolina Central		–		–	15	–	15	.500
Savannah State		–		–	12	–	18	.400
Longwood		–		–	12	–	19	.387
Seattle		–		–	11	–	20	.355
Cal State Bakersfield		–		–	9	–	19	.321
SIU Edwardsville		–		–	8	–	21	.276
Rankings from AP Poll

The 2010–11 Longwood Lancers men's basketball team represented Longwood University during the 2010–11 NCAA Division I men's basketball season. The team was led by eighth-year head coach Mike Gillian, and played their home games at Willett Hall as a Division I independent school.

== Last season ==
The Lancers had a record of 12–19.

== Roster ==
2010–11 Longwood Lancers men's basketball team
Players
Coaches

Pos.	#	Name	Height	Weight	Year	Previous school	Hometown
G	1	Jeremiah Bowman	6 ft 2 in (1.88 m)	188 lb (85 kg)	Jr	Middleburg/Harcum	Washington, DC
G	2	Martiz Washington	6 ft 0 in (1.83 m)	175 lb (79 kg)	Jr	Christchurch	Hopewell, VA
G	3	Anthony Taylor	6 ft 2 in (1.88 m)	200 lb (91 kg)	Fr	Egg Harbor Township	Egg Harbor Township, NJ
C	4	Antwan Carter	6 ft 6 in (1.98 m)	225 lb (102 kg)	Jr	St. Petersburg	St. Petersburg, FL
G	10	Stephen Shockley	6 ft 0 in (1.83 m)	180 lb (82 kg)	So	Heritage High School	Leesburg, VA
G	11	Earl Gee II	5 ft 10 in (1.78 m)	155 lb (70 kg)	Sr	Manchester	Chesterfield, VA
G	12	Tristan Carey	6 ft 4 in (1.93 m)	195 lb (88 kg)	So	Colonial Beach/La Salle	Colonial Beach, VA
G	13	David Robinson	6 ft 4 in (1.93 m)	185 lb (84 kg)	Fr	Cosby	Chesterfield, VA
G	20	Aaron Mitchell	6 ft 2 in (1.88 m)	190 lb (86 kg)	Sr	Manatee	Matoaca, VA
G/F	21	Mark Parker	6 ft 7 in (2.01 m)	192 lb (87 kg)	Fr	West Johnston	Clayton, NC
F	22	Jeylani Dublin	6 ft 6 in (1.98 m)	210 lb (95 kg)	Fr	Millbrook	Brooklyn, NY
G	25	Durann Neil	6 ft 2 in (1.88 m)	205 lb (93 kg)	RS Jr	Leap Academy	Pleasantville, NJ
F	31	Jeffrey Ryan	6 ft 7 in (2.01 m)	185 lb (84 kg)	Sr	Newburgh	Beacon, NY
F	33	Jan van der Kooij	6 ft 7 in (2.01 m)	222 lb (101 kg)	Jr	Roelof van Echten	Tiendeveen, NL
F	44	Jeff Havenstein	6 ft 8 in (2.03 m)	235 lb (107 kg)	Fr	Linganore	Mt. Airy, MD

Head coach

- Mike Gillian (North Adams State)

Assistant coach(es)

- Bill Reinson (Phoenix)
- Doug Thibault (Boise State)
- Tim Fudd (American)

Legend

- (C) Team captain
- (S) Suspended
- (I) Ineligible
- (W) Walk-on
- Injured
- Current redshirt

Roster
Last update: 17 December 2014

== Schedule ==
Date time, TV	Opponent	Result	Record	Site (attendance) city, state
Regular season
November 12*; 8:00 pm	at No. 7 Kansas	L 75–113	0–1	Allen Fieldhouse (16,300); Lawrence, KS
November 15*; 8:00 pm	at Stephen F. Austin	L 54–80	0–2	William R. Johnson Coliseum (1,856); Nacogdoches, TX
November 18*; 7:00 pm	Virginia–Wise	W 104–70	1–2	Willett Hall (1,318); Farmville, VA
November 20*; 7:00 pm	Columbia	W 95–76	2–2	Willett Hall (1,348); Farmville, VA
November 22*; 7:00 pm	Montreat	W 111–62	3–2	Willett Hall (1,162); Farmville, VA
November 27*; 1:00 pm	at Campbell	L 77–93	3–3	Pope Convocation Center (1,023); Buies Creek, NC
November 29*; 7:00 pm	Fairleigh Dickinson	L 78–83	3–4	Willett Hall (1,129); Farmville, VA
December 1*; 7:00 pm, FCS	James Madison	L 78–88	3–5	Willett Hall (1,963); Farmville, VA
December 4*; 2:00 pm	at Marquette	L 65–96	3–6	BMO Harris Bradley Center (13,869); Milwaukee, WI
December 11*; 1:00 pm	at VMI	L 82–114	3–7	Cameron Hall (3,212); Lexington, VA
December 13*; 7:00 pm	at Seton Hall	L 51–78	3–8	Prudential Center (5,836); Newark, NJ
December 17*; 9:00 pm	at New Mexico; IBN Sports Las Vegas Classic	L 54–91	3–9	WisePies Arena (14,144); Albuquerque, NM
December 19*; 4:00 pm	at Colorado; IBN Sports Las Vegas Classic	L 59–104	3–10	Coors Events Center (2,556); Boulder, CO
December 22*; 2:30 pm	vs. SIU Edwardsville; IBN Sports Las Vegas Classic	L 71–78	3–11	Orleans Arena (150); Las Vegas, NV
December 23*; 2:30 pm	vs. South Carolina State; IBN Sports Las Vegas Classic	W 90–73	4–11	Orleans Arena (150); Las Vegas, NV
December 29*; 7:00 pm	William & Mary	W 83–81	5–11	Willett Hall (1,339); Farmville, VA
January 2*; 2:00 pm	Colgate	L 61–80	5–12	Willett Hall (402); Farmville, VA
January 4*; 7:30 pm	at Navy	L 70–87	5–13	Alumni Hall (1,433); Annapolis, MD
January 6*; 7:00 pm	South Dakota	W 85–82	6–13	Willett Hall (306); Farmville, VA
January 9*; 7:00 pm	at North Dakota	L 74–90	6–14	Betty Engelstad Sioux Center (1,301); Grand Forks, ND
January 18*; 7:00 pm	NJIT	W 88–81	7–14	Willett Hall (1,218); Farmville, VA
January 22*; 7:00 pm	at Virginia Tech	L 52–70	7–15	Cassell Coliseum (9,847); Blacksburg, VA
January 25*; 7:00 pm	Campbell	W 72–62	8–15	Willett Hall (1,429); Farmville, VA
January 29*; 2:00 pm	Savannah State	L 67–76	8–16	Willett Hall (1,158); Farmville, VA
February 2*; 7:00 pm	at Colgate	L 86–97	8–17	Cotterell Court (587); Hamilton, NY
February 5*; 2:00 pm	at NJIT	L 64–65	8–18	Fleisher Center (620); Newark, NJ
February 9*; 8:00 pm	at Maryland	L 52–106	8–19	Comcast Center (14,526); College Park, MD
February 12*; 2:00 pm	at Savannah State	W 75–56	9–19	Tiger Arena (633); Savannah, GA
February 16*; 7:00 pm	Southern Virginia	W 99–64	10–19	Willett Hall (1,332); Farmville, VA
February 19*; 2:00 pm	Cal State Bakersfield	W 79–72	11–19	Willett Hall (1,138); Farmville, VA
February 24*; 7:00 pm	Washington Adventist	W 113–84	12–19	Willett Hall (1,348); Farmville, VA
*Non-conference game. (#) Tournament seedings in parentheses. All times are in Eastern Time.
