= The Winchendon School =

Coordinates: 42°40′28.0″N 72°2′16.3″W

- School Alumni Crest

Location
- 172 Ash St, Winchendon, MA 01475; Winchendon, MA; United States

Information
- Type: Private, college-prep, day and boarding
- Motto: Nulla Vestigia Retrorsum.
- Established: 1926
- Founder: Lloyd Harvey Hatch, Sr.
- Head of School: Sean Duncan
- Faculty: 60
- Grades: 9–12, PG
- Enrollment: 265
- Average class size: 8
- Student to teacher ratio: 6:1
- Campus: 326 acres (1,320,000 m^{2})
- Colors: Dark grey, kelly green, and lime green
- Athletics conference: NEPSAC
- Accreditation: NEASC, NAIS
- Endowment: $30 million (as of August 2017)
- Website: winchendon.org

The Winchendon School is a coeducational, preparatory boarding and day school in Massachusetts. Founded in 1926, The Winchendon School has an average classroom size of eight students, an enrollment of approximately 265 students, and a student to teacher ratio of 6:1

== Student Demographics ==
A typical student body represents 18 countries and approximately 25 US states. The school community includes students in 9th grade to students in 12th grade, as well as post-graduates (PGs). The Winchendon School offers a total of $3 million in needs-based grants to its students every year.

== Special Academic Programs ==
The Winchendon School offers courses in world languages, computer science, engineering, English, history and social science, mathematics, performing arts, visual arts, and is recognized for its academic support center, named after the school's founder, Lloyd Harvey Hatch, Sr.

== Athletics ==
The Winchendon School's athletic teams are known as the Wapitis, and their colors are dark gray, kelly green, and lime green. The following competitive sports are offered at The Winchendon School:

- Ice Hockey (boys and girls)
- Basketball (boys and girls)
- Soccer (boys and girls)
- Cross Country (boys and girls)
- Tennis (boys and girls)
- Baseball (boys)
- Softball (girls)
- Volleyball (girls)
- Golf (co-ed)
- Lacrosse (boys and girls)

Winchendon is a part of New England Preparatory School Athletic Council (NEPSAC).

Recent titles include:

== Notable alumni ==
- Justin Dentmon, professional basketball player, 2010 top scorer in the Israel Basketball Premier League
- Francisco Garcia, professional basketball player
- Malcolm Grant, professional basketball player
- Michael Hardman, professional hockey player, Chicago Blackhawks
- Jordan Henriquez, professional basketball player
- Anthony Ireland, professional basketball player
- Jermaine Johnson, former professional basketball player and current member South Carolina House of Representatives
- Mohamed Keita, professional basketball player
- Adam Kemp, professional basketball player
- Victor Page, professional basketball player
- Devon Saddler, professional basketball player
- Greg Selkoe, entrepreneur
- Marshall Strickland, professional basketball player
- Bruno Šundov, professional basketball player
