= 2010–11 Virginia Tech Hokies men's basketball team =

American college basketball season

2010–11 Virginia Tech Hokies men's basketball

NIT, Second Round
- Conference: Atlantic Coast Conference
- Record: 22–12 (9–7 ACC)
- Head coach: Seth Greenberg
- Assistant coaches: Adrian Autry; James Johnson; John Richardson
- Home arena: Cassell Coliseum

2010–11 ACC men's basketball standings
	Conf.				Overall
Team	W		L	PCT	W		L	PCT
No. 7 North Carolina	14	–	2	.875	29	–	8	.784
No. 3 Duke †	13	–	3	.813	32	–	5	.865
Florida State	11	–	5	.688	23	–	11	.676
Clemson	9	–	7	.563	22	–	12	.647
Boston College	9	–	7	.563	21	–	13	.618
Virginia Tech	9	–	7	.563	22	–	12	.647
Maryland	7	–	9	.438	19	–	14	.576
Virginia	7	–	9	.438	16	–	15	.516
Miami (FL)	6	–	10	.375	21	–	15	.583
NC State	5	–	11	.313	15	–	16	.484
Georgia Tech	5	–	11	.313	13	–	18	.419
Wake Forest	1	–	15	.063	8	–	24	.250
† 2011 ACC tournament winner As of March 27, 2011; Rankings from AP poll

The 2010–11 Virginia Tech Hokies men's basketball team represented Virginia Polytechnic Institute and State University during the 2010–11 NCAA Division I men's basketball season. The Hokies, led by eighth year head coach Seth Greenberg, played their home games at Cassell Coliseum and are members of the Atlantic Coast Conference. They finished the season 22–12, 9–7 in ACC play and lost in the semifinals of the 2011 ACC men's basketball tournament to Duke. They were invited to the 2011 National Invitation Tournament where they defeated Bethune–Cookman in the first round before falling to Wichita State in the second round.

== Roster ==
Number	Name	Position	Height	Weight	Year	Hometown
0	Jeff Allen	Forward	6–7	230	Senior	Washington, D.C.
1	Terrell Bell	Guard/Forward	6–7	205	Senior	Stone Mountain, Georgia
2	Andrew Griffin	Forward	6–6	220	Senior	Lynchburg, Virginia
3	Allan Chaney	Forward	6–9	235	Sophomore	Baltimore, Maryland
4	Cadarian Raines	Forward	6–9	238	Sophomore	Petersburg, Virginia
5	Dorenzo Hudson	Guard	6–5	220	Senior	Charlotte, North Carolina
11	Erick Green	Guard	6–4	185	Sophomore	Winchester, Virginia
14	Victor Davila	Forward	6–8	245	Junior	Canóvanas, Puerto Rico
21	Tyrone Garland	Guard	6–1	170	Freshman	Philadelphia, Pennsylvania
22	Prince Parker	Forward	6–6	260	Senior	Norfolk, Virginia
23	Malcolm Delaney	Guard	6–3	190	Senior	Baltimore, Maryland
25	Manny Atkins	Guard/Forward	6–7	200	Sophomore	Stone Mountain, Georgia
31	Jarell Eddie	Guard/Forward	6–7	220	Freshman	Charlotte, North Carolina
32	Paul Debnam	Guard	6–3	195	Senior	Farmville, Virginia
33	J. T. Thompson	Forward	6–6	210	Senior	Monroe, North Carolina

== Schedule ==
Date time, TV	Rank^{#}	Opponent^{#}	Result	Record	Site (attendance) city, state
Regular season
11/12/2010*; 7:45 pm	No. 21	Campbell	W 70–60	1–0	Cassell Coliseum (9,806); Blacksburg, Virginia
11/16/2010*; 8:00 pm, ESPN	No. 22	at No. 3 Kansas State; ESPN's College Hoops Tip-Off Marathon	L 57–73	1–1	Bramlage Coliseum (12,528); Manhattan, Kansas
11/21/2010*; 1:00 pm, NESN/CSN	No. 22	at UNC Greensboro	W 92–70	2–1	Greensboro Coliseum (3,734); Greensboro, North Carolina
11/25/2010*; 1:00 pm, ESPNU		vs. Cal State Northridge; 76 Classic first round	W 72–56	3–1	Anaheim Convention Center; Anaheim, California
11/26/2010*; 1:30 pm, ESPN		vs. Oklahoma State; 76 Classic semifinals	W 56–51	4–1	Anaheim Convention Center; Anaheim, California
11/28/2010*; 8:00 pm, ESPN2		vs. UNLV; 76 Classic championship	L 59–71	4–2	Anaheim Convention Center (2,497); Anaheim, California
12/01/2010*; 7:30 pm, ESPN		No. 22 Purdue; ACC – Big Ten Challenge	L 55–58 ^{OT}	4–3	Cassell Coliseum (9,847); Blacksburg, Virginia
12/05/2010; 6:00 pm, FSN		Virginia	L 54–57	4–4 (0–1)	Cassell Coliseum (9,847); Blacksburg, Virginia
12/12/2010*; 1:00 pm, CSN		Penn State	W 79–69	5–4	Cassell Coliseum (9,847); Blacksburg, Virginia
12/18/2010*; 8:00 pm		vs. Mississippi State; Battle at Atlantis	W 88–57	6–4	Imperial Arena (3,480); Nassau, BAH
12/23/2010*; 7:00 pm		at St. Bonaventure; Fibertech Classic	W 76–68	7–4	Blue Cross Arena (5,285); Rochester, New York
12/30/2010*; 2:00 pm		USC Upstate	W 64–53	8–4	Cassell Coliseum (9,847); Blacksburg, Virginia
01/02/2011*; 2:00 pm		Mount St. Mary's	W 99–34	9–4	Cassell Coliseum (9,847); Blacksburg, Virginia
01/08/2011; 3:00 pm, ESPN2		Florida State	W 71–59	10–4 (1–1)	Cassell Coliseum (7,987); Blacksburg, Virginia
01/13/2010; 9:00 pm, ESPN		at North Carolina	L 61–64	10–5 (1–2)	Dean Smith Center (21,089); Chapel Hill, North Carolina
01/15/2011; 8:00 pm, ACCN		Wake Forest	W 94–65	11–5 (2–2)	Cassell Coliseum (9,847); Blacksburg, Virginia
01/20/2011; 8:15 pm, ESPN2		at Maryland	W 74–57	12–5 (3–2)	Comcast Center (17,950); College Park, Maryland
01/22/2011*; 7:00 pm		Longwood	W 70–52	13–5	Cassell Coliseum (9,847); Blacksburg, Virginia
01/25/2011; 9:00 pm		at Georgia Tech	L 57–72	13–6 (3–3)	Alexander Memorial Coliseum (5,794); Atlanta, Georgia
01/30/2011; 5:30 pm, FSN		Miami (FL)	W 59–49	14–6 (4–3)	Cassell Coliseum (9,847); Blacksburg, Virginia
02/02/2011; 7:00 pm, ESPN2		at NC State	W 77–69	15–6 (5–3)	RBC Center (15,945); Raleigh, North Carolina
02/05/2011; 1:00 pm		at Boston College	L 56–58	15–7 (5–4)	Conte Forum (6,328); Chestnut Hill, Massachusetts
02/13/2011; 1:00 pm, ACCN		Georgia Tech	W 102–77	16–7 (6–4)	Cassell Coliseum (9,847); Blacksburg, Virginia
02/15/2011; 8:00 pm, ACCN		Maryland	W 91–83	17–7 (7–4)	Cassell Coliseum (9,686); Blacksburg, Virginia
02/19/2011; 1:00 pm, ACCN		at Virginia	L 54–61	17–8 (7–5)	John Paul Jones Arena (13,769); Charlottesville, Virginia
02/22/2011; 7:00 pm, ESPN2		at Wake Forest	W 76–62	18–8 (8–5)	LJVM Coliseum (9,482); Winston-Salem, North Carolina
02/26/2011; 9:00 pm, ESPN		No. 1 Duke; ESPN College GameDay	W 64–60	19–8 (9–5)	Cassell Coliseum (9,847); Blacksburg, Virginia
03/01/2011; 9:00 pm, ESPNU		Boston College	L 61–76	19–9 (9–6)	Cassell Coliseum (9,684); Blacksburg, Virginia
03/05/2011; 12:00 pm, ESPN2		at Clemson	L 60–69	19–10 (9–7)	Littlejohn Coliseum (10,000); Clemson, South Carolina
ACC tournament
03/10/2011; 9:00 pm, ACCN	(6)	vs. (11) Georgia Tech; ACC First Round	W 59–43	20–10	Greensboro Coliseum (23,381); Greensboro, North Carolina
03/11/2011; 9:00 pm, ESPN2	(6)	vs. (3) Florida State; ACC Quarterfinals	W 52–51	21–10	Greensboro Coliseum (23,381); Greensboro, North Carolina
03/12/2011; 3:00 pm, ESPN	(6)	vs. (2) No. 5 Duke; ACC Semifinals	L 63–77	21–11	Greensboro Coliseum (23,381); Greensboro, North Carolina
NIT tournament
03/16/2011*; 8:00 pm, ESPNU	(1 VT)	(8 VT) Bethune–Cookman; NIT First Round	W 79–54	22–11	Cassell Coliseum (2,892); Blacksburg, Virginia
03/20/2011*; 11:00 am, ESPN	(1 VT)	(4 VT) Wichita State; NIT Second Round	L 76–79 ^{OT}	22–12	Cassell Coliseum (4,382); Blacksburg, Virginia
*Non-conference game. ^{#}Rankings from AP Poll. (#) Tournament seedings in parentheses. VT=NIT Virginia Tech bracket. All times are in Eastern Time.
