= 2010–11 Boston College Eagles men's basketball team =

American college basketball season

2010–11 Boston College Eagles men's basketball
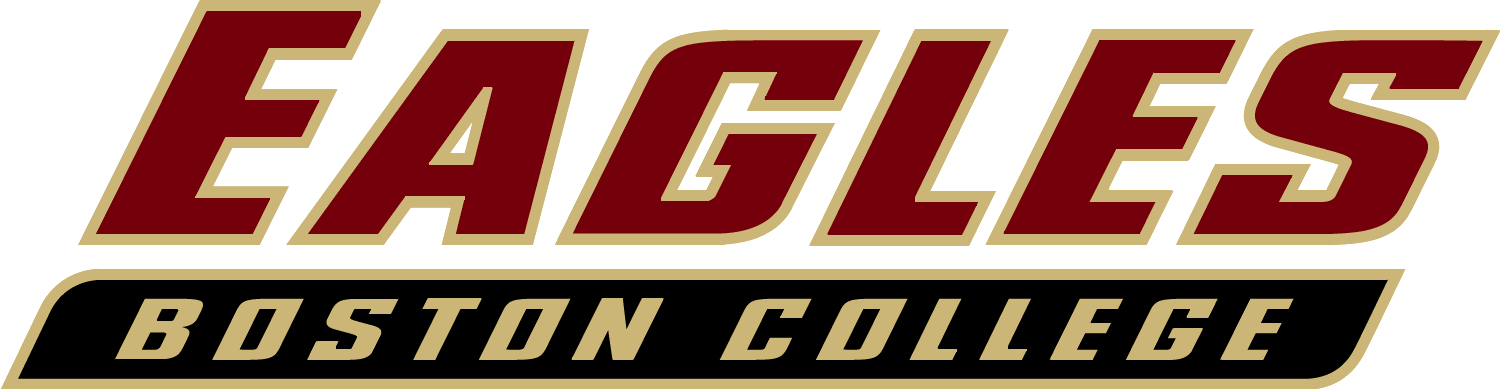

NIT, Second round
- Conference: Atlantic Coast Conference
- Record: 21–13 (9–7 ACC)
- Head coach: Steve Donahue
- Assistant coaches: Joe Jones; Nat Graham; Akbar Waheed
- Home arena: Conte Forum

2010–11 ACC men's basketball standings
	Conf.				Overall
Team	W		L	PCT	W		L	PCT
No. 7 North Carolina	14	–	2	.875	29	–	8	.784
No. 3 Duke †	13	–	3	.813	32	–	5	.865
Florida State	11	–	5	.688	23	–	11	.676
Clemson	9	–	7	.563	22	–	12	.647
Boston College	9	–	7	.563	21	–	13	.618
Virginia Tech	9	–	7	.563	22	–	12	.647
Maryland	7	–	9	.438	19	–	14	.576
Virginia	7	–	9	.438	16	–	15	.516
Miami (FL)	6	–	10	.375	21	–	15	.583
NC State	5	–	11	.313	15	–	16	.484
Georgia Tech	5	–	11	.313	13	–	18	.419
Wake Forest	1	–	15	.063	8	–	24	.250
† 2011 ACC tournament winner As of March 27, 2011; Rankings from AP poll

The 2010–11 Boston College Eagles men's basketball team represented Boston College in the 2010–11 NCAA Division I men's basketball season. New head coach Steve Donahue, formerly of Cornell, took over the Eagles from former coach Al Skinner. The team played its home games at Conte Forum in Chestnut Hill, Massachusetts. The team finished 2010 with a 15–16 record, missing the 2010 NCAA Division I men's basketball tournament.

== Pre-season ==
=== Recruiting ===
College recruiting information
Name	Hometown	School	Height	Weight	Commit date
Gabe Moton; G	St. Petersburg, FL	St. Petersburg	6 ft 2 in (1.88 m)	170 lb (77 kg)	Jul 28, 2010
Gabe Moton; G	Recruit ratings: (40)				
Danny Rubin; F	Chevy Chase, MD	Landon School	6 ft 6 in (1.98 m)	170 lb (77 kg)	May 26, 2010
Danny Rubin; F	Recruit ratings: (84)				
Overall recruit ranking:
Note: In many cases, Scout, Rivals, 247Sports, On3, and ESPN may conflict in their listings of height and weight.; In these cases, the average was taken. ESPN grades are on a 100-point scale.; Sources: "2010 Team Ranking". Rivals.

== 2010–2011 Roster ==
=== Departures from 2009–2010 Team ===
- Evan Ravenel, F – Transferred
- Rakim Sanders, G-F – Transferred
- Tyler Roche, F – Graduated

=== Roster ===
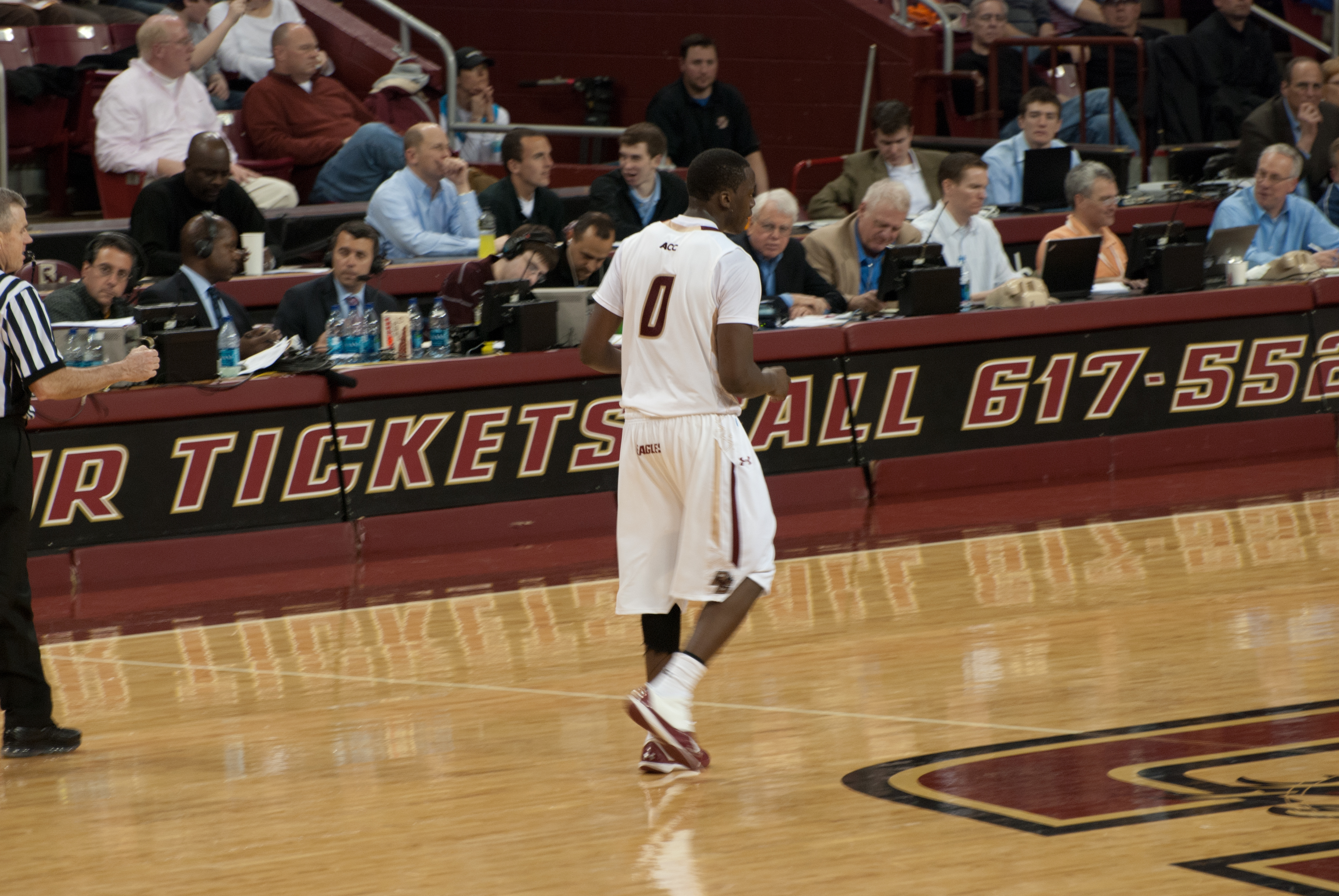
Reggie Jackson

Name	Number	Position	Height	Weight	Year	Hometown
Reggie Jackson	0	G	6–3	208	Jr.	Colorado Springs, Colorado
Gabe Moton	4	G	6–2	170	Fr.	St. Petersburg, Florida
Biko Paris	5	G	6–1	194	Sr.	New Orleans, Louisiana
Corey Raji	11	F	6–6	218	Sr.	Township of Washington, Bergen County, New Jersey
Joe Trapani	12	F	6–8	232	Sr.	Madison, Connecticut
Nick Mosakowski	14	G	6–1	187	Sr.	Swampscott, Massachusetts
Matt Humphrey	15	G	6–5	185	Jr.	Chicago, Illinois
John Cahill	20	G	6–1	170	Sr.	Albany, New York
Chris Kowalski	24	F	6–6	240	Jr.	Dorchester, Massachusetts
Peter Rehnquist	25	G-F	6–4	210	Jr.	Sharon, Massachusetts
Dallas Elmore	30	G	6–5	210	Jr.	Fort Collins, Colorado
Danny Rubin	31	G	6–6	170	Fr.	Chevy Chase, Maryland
Josh Southern	52	C	6–10	263	Sr.	Saginaw, Michigan
Courtney Dunn	55	F	6–8	238	Sr.	Dallas, Texas

== Rankings ==
Ranking movement Legend: ██ Improvement in ranking. ██ Decrease in ranking. ██ Not ranked the previous week. rv=Others receiving votes.
Poll	Pre	Wk 1	Wk 2	Wk 3	Wk 4	Wk 5	Wk 6	Wk 7	Wk 8	Wk 9
AP	NR	NR	NR	NR	NR	NR	NR	NR	NR	NR
Coaches	NR	NR	NR	NR	NR	NR	NR	NR	NR	NR

== Schedule ==
Date time, TV	Rank^{#}	Opponent^{#}	Result	Record	Site (attendance) city, state
Exhibition
11/06/2010*; 3:00 pm		Philadelphia	W 85–58	–	Conte Forum (N/A); Chestnut Hill, MA
Regular season
11/12/2010*; 7:00 pm		St. Francis (NY)	W 79–49	1–0	Conte Forum (3,740); Chestnut Hill, MA
11/18/2010*; 7:00 pm		Yale	L 67–75	1–1	Conte Forum (3,813); Chestnut Hill, MA
11/22/2010*; 7:00 pm		Holy Cross	W 69–54	2–1	Conte Forum (3,672); Chestnut Hill, MA
11/25/2010*; 12:00 pm, ESPN2		vs. Texas A&M; Old Spice Classic 1st round	W 67–65	3–1	HP Field House (N/A); Orlando, FL
11/26/2010*; 12:00 pm, ESPN		vs. Wisconsin; Old Spice Classic Semifinals	L 55–65	3–2	HP Field House (N/A); Orlando, FL
11/27/2010*; 1:00 pm, ESPNU		vs. California; Old Spice Classic 3rd place game	W 68–46	4–2	HP Field House (N/A); Orlando, FL
12/01/2010*; 7:15 pm, ESPNU		Indiana; ACC-Big Ten Challenge	W 88–76	5–2	Conte Forum (5,329); Chestnut Hill, MA
12/04/2010*; 6:30 pm, CSNNE		vs. Massachusetts	W 76–71	6–2	TD Garden (10,642); Boston, MA
12/08/2010*; 7:30 pm		Providence	W 88–86	7–2	Conte Forum (5,462); Chestnut Hill, MA
12/12/2010; 4:00 pm, FSN		at Maryland	W 79–75	8–2 (1–0)	Comcast Center (15,851); College Park, MD
12/19/2010*; 3:00 pm		Bryant	W 93–77	9–2	Conte Forum (5,126); Chestnut Hill, MA
12/22/2010*; 7:00 pm		Bucknell	W 84–80	10–2	Conte Forum (4,116); Chestnut Hill, MA
12/29/2010*; 7:00 pm		at Rhode Island	L 65–67	10–3	Ryan Center (6,395); Kingston, RI
01/01/2011*; 5:30 pm, ESPNU		at South Carolina	W 85–70	11–3	Colonial Life Arena (8,658); Columbia, SC
01/05/2011*; 7:00 pm		Harvard	L 69–78	11–4	Conte Forum (4,129); Chestnut Hill, MA
01/08/2011; 4:00 pm, Raycom		Georgia Tech	W 86–75	12–4 (2–0)	Conte Forum (6,516); Chestnut Hill, MA
01/11/2011; 7:00 pm, ESPNU		NC State	W 75–66	13–4 (3–0)	Conte Forum (3,652); Chestnut Hill, MA
01/15/2011; 6:00 pm, ESPNU		at Miami (FL)	L 71–72	13–5 (3–1)	BankUnited Center (6,107); Coral Gables, FL
01/19/2011; 7:00 pm		Virginia	W 70–67	14–5 (4–1)	Conte Forum (4,628); Chestnut Hill, MA
01/22/2011; 7:00 pm, ESPNU		at Florida State	L 51–67	14–6 (4–2)	Donald L. Tucker Center (11,604); Tallahassee, FL
01/27/2011; 6:00 pm, ACC Network		at No. 3 Duke	L 68–84	14–7 (4–3)	Cameron Indoor Stadium (9,314); Durham, NC
02/01/2011; 9:00 pm, ACC Network		North Carolina	L 74–106	14–8 (4–4)	Conte Forum (7,883); Chestnut Hill, MA
02/05/2011; 1:00 pm		Virginia Tech	W 58–56	15–8 (5–4)	Conte Forum (6,328); Chestnut Hill, MA
02/08/2011; 9:00 pm, ESPNU		at Clemson	L 69–77	15–9 (5–5)	Littlejohn Coliseum (8,925); Clemson, SC
02/12/2011; 1:00 pm, ACC Network		Maryland	W 76–72	16–9 (6–5)	Conte Forum (8,606); Chestnut Hill, MA
02/19/2011; 4:00 pm, ESPN		at No. 19 North Carolina	L 46–48	16–10 (6–6)	Dean E. Smith Center (21,159); Chapel Hill, NC
02/23/2011; 7:00 pm		Miami (FL)	L 64–73	16–11 (6–7)	Conte Forum (6,138); Chestnut Hill, MA
02/26/2011; 12:00 pm, Raycom		at Virginia	W 63–44	17–11 (7–7)	John Paul Jones Arena (10,747); Charlottesville, VA
03/01/2011; 9:00 pm, ESPNU		at Virginia Tech	W 76–61	18–11 (8–7)	Cassell Coliseum (9,684); Blacksburg, VA
03/06/2011; 12:00 pm, ACC Network		Wake Forest	W 84–68	19–11 (9–7)	Conte Forum (8,606); Chestnut Hill, MA
ACC tournament
03/10/2011; 2:00 pm, ACC Network	(5)	vs. (12) Wake Forest; ACC First round	W 81–67	20–11	Greensboro Coliseum (23,381); Greensboro, NC
03/11/2011; 2:00 pm, ACC Network	(5)	vs. (4) Clemson; ACC Quarterfinals	L 47–70	20–12	Greensboro Coliseum (23,381); Greensboro, NC
NIT
03/15/2011; 9:00 pm, ESPNU	(1 BC)	at (8 BC) McNeese State; NIT First round	W 82–64	21–12	Burton Coliseum (5,035); Lake Charles, LA
03/19/2011; 11:00 am, ESPN	(1 BC)	(4 BC) Northwestern; Second round	L 67–85	21–13	Conte Forum (2,765); Chestnut Hill, MA
*Non-conference game. ^{#}Rankings from AP Poll. (#) Tournament seedings in parentheses. BC=NIT Boston College bracket. All times are in Eastern Time.
