= 2010–11 Atlantic Coast Conference men's basketball season =

- League: NCAA Division I
- Sport: Basketball
- Duration: November 8, 2010 through March 6, 2011
- Teams: 12
- TV partner(s): ACC Network (Raycom Sports), ESPN, Raycom Sports, Learfield Sports

Regular Season
- First place: North Carolina (14–2)
- Conference Champion: Duke
- Runners-up: Duke (13–3)

Atlantic Coast Conference men's basketball seasons
- ← 2009–10 2011–12 →

2010–11 ACC men's basketball standings
	Conf.				Overall
Team	W		L	PCT	W		L	PCT
No. 7 North Carolina	14	–	2	.875	29	–	8	.784
No. 3 Duke †	13	–	3	.813	32	–	5	.865
Florida State	11	–	5	.688	23	–	11	.676
Clemson	9	–	7	.563	22	–	12	.647
Boston College	9	–	7	.563	21	–	13	.618
Virginia Tech	9	–	7	.563	22	–	12	.647
Maryland	7	–	9	.438	19	–	14	.576
Virginia	7	–	9	.438	16	–	15	.516
Miami (FL)	6	–	10	.375	21	–	15	.583
NC State	5	–	11	.313	15	–	16	.484
Georgia Tech	5	–	11	.313	13	–	18	.419
Wake Forest	1	–	15	.063	8	–	24	.250
† 2011 ACC tournament winner As of March 27, 2011; Rankings from AP poll

The 2010–11 Atlantic Coast Conference men's basketball season was the 58th season for the league.

== Preseason ==
The AP preseason All-American team was named on November 1. Duke's Kyle Singler was the leading vote-getter with 62 of a possible 65 votes. North Carolina forward Harrison Barnes received 17 votes and became the first freshman in history to be named to the preseason team.

== Records ==
Duke coach Mike Krzyzewski won his 800th game at Duke on November 24, making him the fifth ever coach to reach that milestone at one school. Kyle Singler and Virginia Tech guard Malcolm Delaney each passed the 2,000 point mark for their careers.

== Rankings ==
Duke was the preseason #1 in the AP and ESPN/USA Today Coaches Polls while North Carolina was ranked #9 and Virginia Tech was #23.
However, Duke later dropped to #3 and then #5, but eventually regained the #1 ranking for one week before dropping again to #4.
North Carolina dropped out of the rankings after week 3 and Virginia Tech dropped out after week 2 leaving Duke as the only ACC school in the top 25 until week 11 when Florida State spent one week at #22 before dropping back out of the rankings.
North Carolina reappeared at #24 in week 12 and has since moved up to #6.

== Season awards ==
Player of the Year

- Nolan Smith

Rookie of the Year

- Harrison Barnes

Coach of the Year

- Roy Williams

Defensive Player of the Year

- John Henson

All-Atlantic Coast Conference.

First Team
- Nolan Smith^{1} – Duke
- Jordan Williams – Maryland
- Malcolm Delaney – Virginia Tech
- Kyle Singler – Duke
- Reggie Jackson – Boston College

1 – Denotes unanimous selection

Second Team
- Tyler Zeller – North Carolina
- John Henson – North Carolina
- Harrison Barnes – North Carolina
- Iman Shumpert – Georgia Tech
- Jeff Allen – Virginia Tech
Third Team
- Chris Singleton – Florida State
- Demontez Stitt – Clemson
- Joe Trapani – Boston College
- Malcolm Grant – Miami
- Kendall Marshall – North Carolina

All-ACC Freshman team

- Harrison Barnes^{1} – North Carolina
- Travis McKie – Wake Forest
- Kendall Marshall – North Carolina
- Terrell Stoglin – Maryland
- C. J. Leslie – N.C. State

1 – Denotes unanimous selection

All-ACC Defensive team

- John Henson^{1} – North Carolina
- Chris Singleton – Florida State
- Iman Shumpert – Georgia Tech
- Nolan Smith – Duke
- Jerai Grant – Clemson

1 – Denotes unanimous selection
