= 2010–11 Georgia Tech Yellow Jackets men's basketball team =

American college basketball season

2010–11 Georgia Tech Yellow Jackets men's basketball
- Conference: Atlantic Coast Conference
- Record: 13–18 (5–11 ACC)
- Head coach: Paul Hewitt (11th season)
- Assistant coaches: Peter Zaharris (11th season); Darryl Labarrie (2nd season); Robert McCullum (1st season)
- Home arena: Alexander Memorial Coliseum

2010–11 ACC men's basketball standings
	Conf.				Overall
Team	W		L	PCT	W		L	PCT
No. 7 North Carolina	14	–	2	.875	29	–	8	.784
No. 3 Duke †	13	–	3	.813	32	–	5	.865
Florida State	11	–	5	.688	23	–	11	.676
Clemson	9	–	7	.563	22	–	12	.647
Boston College	9	–	7	.563	21	–	13	.618
Virginia Tech	9	–	7	.563	22	–	12	.647
Maryland	7	–	9	.438	19	–	14	.576
Virginia	7	–	9	.438	16	–	15	.516
Miami (FL)	6	–	10	.375	21	–	15	.583
NC State	5	–	11	.313	15	–	16	.484
Georgia Tech	5	–	11	.313	13	–	18	.419
Wake Forest	1	–	15	.063	8	–	24	.250
† 2011 ACC tournament winner As of March 27, 2011; Rankings from AP poll

The 2010–11 Georgia Tech Yellow Jackets men's basketball team represented Georgia Tech during the 2010–11 NCAA Division I men's basketball season. The Yellow Jackets, led by 11th-year head coach Paul Hewitt, played their home games at the Alexander Memorial Coliseum and were members of the Atlantic Coast Conference. They finished the season 13–18 and 5–11 in ACC play to finish in eleventh place. They lost to Virginia Tech in the first round of the ACC Basketball tournament. Following the conclusion of the season, Georgia Tech fired Hewitt and before his contract had expired with Georgia Tech.

== Previous season ==
The Yellow Jackets finished the 2009–10 season 23–13 overall, 7–9 in ACC play. Due to a strong run in the ACC tournament, the Yellow Jackets were invited to the NCAA tournament where, as the ten seed, they beat the seven seed Oklahoma State before falling to the two seed Ohio State in the round of 32.

== Roster ==
2010–11 Georgia Tech Yellow Jackets men's basketball team
Players
Coaches

Pos.	#	Name	Height	Weight	Year	Hometown
G	0	Mfon Udofia	6 ft 2 in (1.88 m)	195 lb (88 kg)	So	Stone Mountain, Georgia
G	1	Iman Shumpert	6 ft 5 in (1.96 m)	212 lb (96 kg)	Jr	Oak Park, Illinois
G	3	Maurice Miller	6 ft 2 in (1.88 m)	188 lb (85 kg)	Sr	Memphis, Tennessee
G	4	Nick Foreman	6 ft 3 in (1.91 m)	210 lb (95 kg)	Jr	Bellaire, Texas
C	5	Daniel Miller	6 ft 11 in (2.11 m)	275 lb (125 kg)	Fr	Loganville, Georgia
G	10	Lance Storrs	6 ft 5 in (1.96 m)	225 lb (102 kg)	Sr	Decatur, Georgia
F	11	Brian Oliver	6 ft 6 in (1.98 m)	226 lb (103 kg)	So	Glassboro, New Jersey
G	12	Kyle Speller	6 ft 2 in (1.88 m)	185 lb (84 kg)	Fr	Riverside, California
G	13	McPherson Moore	6 ft 3 in (1.91 m)	200 lb (91 kg)	Fr	St. Louis, Missouri
G/F	14	Jason Morris	6 ft 5 in (1.96 m)	231 lb (105 kg)	Fr	Augusta, Georgia
F	24	Kammeon Holsey	6 ft 8 in (2.03 m)	234 lb (106 kg)	Fr	Sparta, Georgia
G	33	Derek Craig	6 ft 4 in (1.93 m)	205 lb (93 kg)	Jr	Spring, Texas
G	41	Glen Rice Jr.	6 ft 5 in (1.96 m)	206 lb (93 kg)	So	Marietta, Georgia
C	42	Nate Hicks	6 ft 10 in (2.08 m)	218 lb (99 kg)	Fr	Panama City Beach, Florida

Head coach

- Paul Hewitt (St. John Fisher)

Assistant coach(es)

- Peter Zaharris (NYU)
- Darryl Labarrie (Georgia Tech)
- Robert McCullum (Birmingham–Southern)

Legend

- (C) Team captain
- (S) Suspended
- (I) Ineligible
- (W) Walk-on
- Injured
- Current redshirt

Roster
Last update: 2010-09-25

== Schedule ==
Date time, TV	Rank^{#}	Opponent^{#}	Result	Record	High points	High rebounds	High assists	Site (attendance) city, state
Exhibition
November 5, 2010*; ACCNX/ESPN+		Clark Atlanta	W 71–68 ^{OT}	-	20 – Rice Jr.	13 – Oliver	– -	Alexander Memorial Coliseum; Atlanta, Georgia
Regular season
November 12, 2010*; 7:30 pm		Charleston Southern	W 52–39	1–0	12 – Udofia	7 – Oliver	5 – Shumpert	Alexander Memorial Coliseum (5,781); Atlanta, Georgia
November 15, 2010*; 7:30 pm		at Kennesaw State	L 63–80	1–1	20 – Shumpert	7 – Oliver	2 – Rice Jr.	KSU Convocation Center (4,784); Kennesaw, GA
November 17, 2010*; 7:30 pm		Albany	W 78–51	2–1	24 – Shumpert	10 – Shumpert	4 – Shumpert	Alexander Memorial Coliseum (5,121); Atlanta, GA
November 19, 2010*; 7:30 pm		Niagara	W 77–51	3–1	17 – Oliver	7 – Oliver	6 – Rice Jr.	Alexander Memorial Coliseum (5,313); Atlanta, GA
November 26, 2010*; 5:30 pm		vs. UTEP; Legends Classic	W 71–61	4–1	19 – Rice Jr.	12 – Oliver	5 – Rice Jr.	Boardwalk Hall; Atlantic City, NJ
November 27, 2010*; 7:30 pm		vs. No. 9 Syracuse; Legends Classic	L 76–80	4–2	32 – Oliver	6 – Oliver	8 – Shumpert	Boardwalk Hall (5,271); Atlantic City, NJ
November 30, 2010*; 7:00 pm		at Northwestern; ACC/Big Ten Challenge	L 71–91	4–3	16 – Rice Jr.	6 – Rice Jr.	4 – Rice Jr.	Welsh-Ryan Arena (4,455); Evanston, IL
December 7, 2010*; 7:00 pm		Georgia	L 72–73	4–4	18 – Shumpert	11 – Rice Jr.	5 – Oliver	Alexander Memorial Coliseum (6,725); Atlanta, GA
December 11, 2010*; 4:00 pm		Savannah State	W 69–59	5–4	17 – Shumpert	10 – Shumpert	3 – Oliver	Alexander Memorial Coliseum (5,436); Atlanta, GA
December 18, 2010*; 5:00 pm		vs. Richmond; Battle at Atlantis	W 67–54	6–4	21 – Shumpert	6 – Shumpert	3 – Rice Jr.	Atlantis Paradise Island (3,480); Paradise Island, BS
December 22, 2010*; 7:00 pm		at Siena	L 57–62	6–5	15 – Rice Jr.	10 – Miller	4 – Rice Jr.	MVP Arena (7,468); Albany, NY
December 31, 2010*; 1:00 pm		Mercer	W 87–78	7–5	24 – Rice Jr.	8 – Shumpert	6 – Miller	Alexander Memorial Coliseum (6,094); Atlanta, GA
January 2, 2011*; 6:00 pm		Charlotte	L 83–86 ^{2OT}	7–6	28 – Shumpert	9 – Shumpert	8 – Shumpert	Alexander Memorial Coliseum (5,768); Atlanta, GA
January 8, 2011; 4:00 pm		at Boston College	L 75–86	7–7 (0–1)	18 – Holsey	7 – Rice Jr.	4 – Shumpert	Conte Forum (6,516); Chestnut Hill, MA
January 12, 2011; 7:00 pm		at Clemson	L 62–87	7–8 (0–2)	14 – Udofia	4 – Tied	3 – Shumpert	Littlejohn Coliseum (10,000); Clemson, SC
January 16, 2011; 7:45 pm		North Carolina	W 78–58	8–8 (1–2)	30 – Shumpert	6 – Oliver	4 – Miller	Alexander Memorial Coliseum (8,125); Atlanta, GA
January 19, 2011; 7:00 pm		Wake Forest	W 74–39	9–8 (2–2)	21 – Rice Jr.	8 – Morris	3 – Storrs	Alexander Memorial Coliseum (6,062); Atlanta, GA
January 22, 2011; 12:00 pm		at Virginia	L 64–72	9–9 (2–3)	19 – Shumpert	9 – Shumpert	4 – Shumpert	John Paul Jones Arena (11,885); Raleigh, NC
January 25, 2011; 9:00 pm		Virginia Tech	W 72–57	10–9 (3–3)	28 – Oliver	12 – Shumpert	11 – Shumpert	Alexander Memorial Coliseum (5,794); Atlanta, GA
January 30, 2011; 7:45 pm		Maryland	L 63–74	10–10 (3–4)	16 – Rice Jr.	12 – Rice Jr.	5 – Rice Jr.	Alexander Memorial Coliseum (6,257); Atlanta, GA
February 3, 2011; 7:00 pm		at Miami (FL)	L 57–59	10–11 (3–5)	28 – Rice Jr.	8 – Oliver	2 – Tied	BankUnited Center (4,865); Coral Gables, FL
February 5, 2011; 1:00 pm		Clemson	L 56–65	10–12 (3–6)	17 – Shumpert	8 – Shumpert	3 – Rice Jr.	Alexander Memorial Coliseum (6,219); Atlanta, GA
February 10, 2011; 7:00 pm		Florida State	L 63–72	10–13 (3–7)	25 – Shumpert	10 – Shumpert	3 – Udofia	Alexander Memorial Coliseum (5,902); Atlanta, GA
February 13, 2011; 1:00 pm		at Virginia Tech	L 77–102	10–14 (3–8)	27 – Shumpert	5 – Rice Jr.	5 – Rice Jr.	Cassell Coliseum (9,847); Blacksburg, VA
February 16, 2011*; 7:30 pm		Chattanooga	W 62–53	11–14	27 – Rice Jr.	11 – Shumpert	3 – Tied	Alexander Memorial Coliseum (5,364); Atlanta, GA
February 20, 2011; 7:45 pm		at No. 5 Duke	L 57–79	11–15 (3–9)	13 – Tied	6 – Shumpert	5 – Miller	Cameron Indoor Stadium (9,314); Durham, NC
February 23, 2011; 7:00 pm		Virginia	L 56–62	11–16 (3–10)	12 – Shumpert	6 – Storrs	4 – Shumpert	Alexander Memorial Coliseum (5,537); Atlanta, GA
February 26, 2011; 2:00 pm		at NC State	L 74–79	11–17 (3–11)	21 – Shumpert	8 – Shumpert	7 – Shumpert	RBC Center (16,020); Raleigh, NC
March 3, 2011; 8:00 pm		at Wake Forest	W 80–54	12–17 (4–11)	24 – Shumpert	8 – Tied	4 – Rice Jr.	LJVM Coliseum (9,369); Winston-Salem, NC
March 6, 2011; 2:30 pm		Miami (FL)	W 66–57	13–17 (5–11)	19 – Shumpert	7 – Storrs	5 – Miller	Alexander Memorial Coliseum (8,025); Atlanta, GA
ACC tournament
March 10, 2011*; 9:00 pm	(11)	vs. (6) Virginia Tech; ACC First Round	L 43–59	13–18	14 – Rice Jr.	6 – Miller	2 – Tied	Greensboro Coliseum (23,381); Greensboro, NC
*Non-conference game. ^{#}Rankings from AP Poll. (#) Tournament seedings in parentheses. All times are in Eastern Time.
