= 2010–11 Maryland Terrapins men's basketball team =

American college basketball season

2010–11 Maryland Terrapins men's basketball
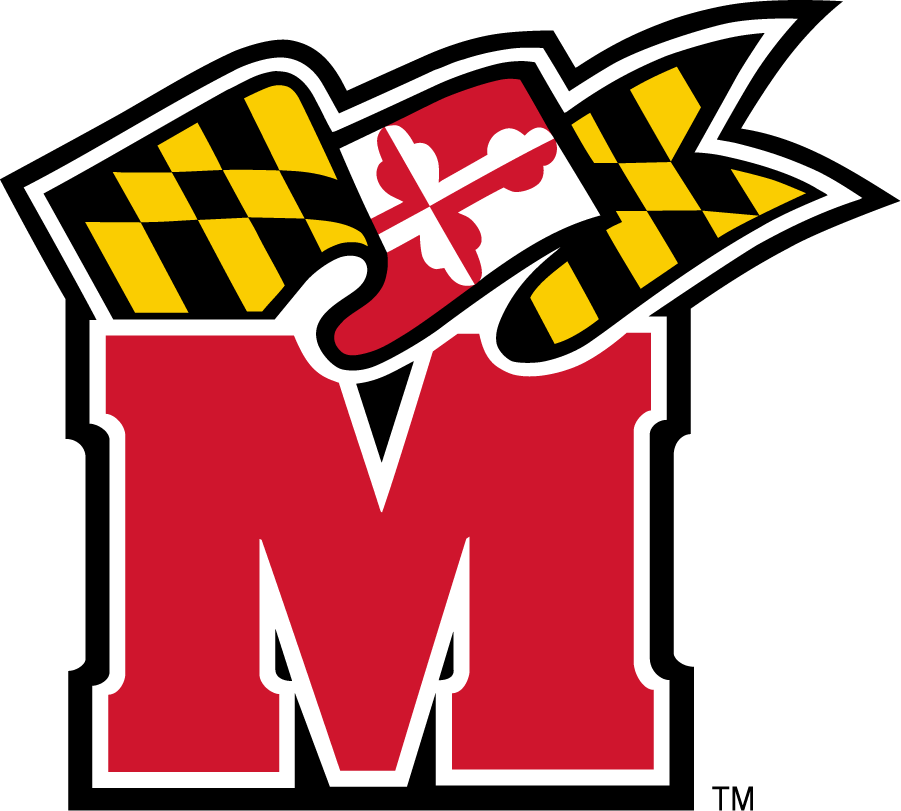
- Conference: Atlantic Coast Conference
- Record: 19–14 (7–9 ACC)
- Head coach: Gary Williams
- Assistant coach: Keith Booth; Bino Ranson; Robert Ehsan; Troy Wainwright
- Home arena: Comcast Center

2010–11 ACC men's basketball standings
	Conf.				Overall
Team	W		L	PCT	W		L	PCT
No. 7 North Carolina	14	–	2	.875	29	–	8	.784
No. 3 Duke †	13	–	3	.813	32	–	5	.865
Florida State	11	–	5	.688	23	–	11	.676
Clemson	9	–	7	.563	22	–	12	.647
Boston College	9	–	7	.563	21	–	13	.618
Virginia Tech	9	–	7	.563	22	–	12	.647
Maryland	7	–	9	.438	19	–	14	.576
Virginia	7	–	9	.438	16	–	15	.516
Miami (FL)	6	–	10	.375	21	–	15	.583
NC State	5	–	11	.313	15	–	16	.484
Georgia Tech	5	–	11	.313	13	–	18	.419
Wake Forest	1	–	15	.063	8	–	24	.250
† 2011 ACC tournament winner As of March 27, 2011; Rankings from AP poll

The 2010–11 Maryland Terrapins men's basketball team represented the University of Maryland in the 2010–11 college basketball season as a member of the Atlantic Coast Conference (ACC). The team was led by 22nd-year head coach Gary Williams and played their home games at the Comcast Center. They finished the season 19–14, 7–9 in ACC play and lost in the quarterfinals of the ACC tournament to Duke. They were not invited to the post season NCAA or NIT tournaments, and announced that they would decline invitations to any other event.

Against Clemson, sophomore center Jordan Williams recorded his 13th consecutive double-double, which broke the school record set by Len Elmore in 1974.

Hometowns of team roster

== Pre-season ==
=== Recruiting ===
College recruiting
Name	Hometown	School	Height	Weight	Commit date
Mychal Parker; SF	Charlottesville, VA	The Miller School	6 ft 6 in (1.98 m)	190 lb (86 kg)	Aug 20, 2009
Mychal Parker; SF	Recruit ratings: Scout: Rivals: (95)				
Pe'Shon Howard; PG	Mouth of Wilson, VA	Oak Hill Academy	6 ft 2 in (1.88 m)	200 lb (91 kg)	Jan 3, 2010
Pe'Shon Howard; PG	Recruit ratings: Scout: Rivals: (92)				
Terrell Stoglin; PG	Tucson, AZ	Santa Rita High School	6 ft 0 in (1.83 m)	165 lb (75 kg)	Apr 2, 2009
Terrell Stoglin; PG	Recruit ratings: Scout: Rivals: (93)				
Ashton Pankey; PF	Jersey City, NJ	St. Anthony High School	6 ft 8 in (2.03 m)	220 lb (100 kg)	Nov 16, 2009
Ashton Pankey; PF	Recruit ratings: Scout: Rivals: (91)				
Haukur Pálsson; SF	Reykjavík	Monte Verde Academy	6 ft 6 in (1.98 m)	210 lb (95 kg)	Mar 5, 2010
Haukur Pálsson; SF	Recruit ratings: Scout: Rivals: (89)				
Berend Weijs; C	Amsterdam	Harcum College	6 ft 10 in (2.08 m)	215 lb (98 kg)	May 13, 2010
Berend Weijs; C	Recruit ratings: Scout: (40)				
Overall recruit ranking: Scout: UR Rivals: UR ESPN: UR
Note: In many cases, Scout, Rivals, 247Sports, On3, and ESPN may conflict in their listings of height and weight.; In these cases, the average was taken. ESPN grades are on a 100-point scale.; Sources: "Men's Basketball Recruiting". Scout.; "College Basketball Recruiting Schools". ESPN.; "Scout.com Team Recruiting Rankings". Scout.; "2010 Team Ranking". Rivals.

=== Accolades ===
Team

- Atlantic Coast Conference preseason #6 team.

Jordan Williams

- John R. Wooden Award candidate.

== Roster ==
2010–11 Maryland Terrapins men's basketball team
Players
Coaches

Pos.	#	Name	Height	Weight	Year	Hometown
G	14	Sean Mosley (C)	6 ft 4 in (1.93 m)	210 lb (95 kg)	Jr	Baltimore, Maryland
F	15	Ersin Levent	6 ft 7 in (2.01 m)	185 lb (84 kg)	Jr	Rockville, Maryland
F	20	Jordan Williams	6 ft 10 in (2.08 m)	260 lb (118 kg)	So	Torrington, Connecticut
G	1	Adrian Bowie	6 ft 2 in (1.88 m)	190 lb (86 kg)	Sr	Greenbelt, Maryland
G/F	24	Cliff Tucker	6 ft 6 in (1.98 m)	205 lb (93 kg)	Sr	El Paso, Texas
F	33	Dino Gregory (C)	6 ft 7 in (2.01 m)	230 lb (104 kg)	Sr	Baltimore, Maryland
F	35	James Padgett	6 ft 8 in (2.03 m)	225 lb (102 kg)	So	Brooklyn, New York
G	21	Pe'Shon Howard	6 ft 3 in (1.91 m)	195 lb (88 kg)	Fr	Los Angeles, California
F	13	Haukur Pálsson	6 ft 6 in (1.98 m)	190 lb (86 kg)	Fr	Reykjavík, Iceland
G	42	Ashton Pankey	6 ft 9 in (2.06 m)	220 lb (100 kg)	Fr	Bronx, New York
F	11	Mychal Parker	6 ft 5 in (1.96 m)	195 lb (88 kg)	Fr	Washington, North Carolina
G	12	Terrell Stoglin	6 ft 1 in (1.85 m)	185 lb (84 kg)	Fr	Tucson, Arizona
C	10	Berend Weijs	6 ft 10 in (2.08 m)	200 lb (91 kg)	Jr	Amsterdam, Netherlands

Head coach

- Gary Williams (Maryland)

Assistant coach(es)

- Keith Booth (Maryland)
- Bino Ranson (SNHU)
- Robert Ehsan (UC Davis)
- Troy Wainwright (Maryland)

Legend

- (C) Team captain
- (S) Suspended
- (I) Ineligible
- (W) Walk-on
- Injured
- Current redshirt

Roster

== Schedule ==
Date time, TV	Rank^{#}	Opponent^{#}	Result	Record	High points	High rebounds	High assists	Site (attendance) city, state
Exhibition
11/01/10*; 8:00 pm		Florida Southern	W 106–58	–	18 – Williams	7 – Gregory, Williams	10 – Tucker	Comcast Center; College Park, MD
Regular season
11/08/10*; 8:00 pm, CSN		Seattle; 2K Sports Classic	W 105–76	1–0	21 – Mosley	15 – Williams	8 – Howard	Comcast Center (13,427); College Park, MD
11/10/10*; 7:00 pm, ESPNU		College of Charleston; 2K Sports Classic	W 75–74	2–0	26 – Williams	15 – Williams	4 – Bowie, Howard, Mosley	Comcast Center (13,708); College Park, MD
11/14/10*; 2:00 pm, CSN		Maine	W 89–59	3–0	20 – Williams	11 – Williams	5 – Bowie	Comcast Center (13,041); College Park, MD
11/18/10*; 7:00 pm, ESPN2		vs. No. 4 Pittsburgh; 2K Sports Classic	L 70–79	3–1	17 – Tucker	8 – Williams	5 – Tucker	Madison Square Garden; New York, NY
11/19/10*; 5:00 pm, ESPN2		vs. No. 16 Illinois; 2K Sports Classic	L 76–80	3–2	17 – Stoglin	12 – Williams	5 – Mosley	Madison Square Garden; New York, NY
11/23/10*; 9:00 pm, TerpsTV		Delaware State	W 72–54	4–2	15 – Tucker	8 – Gregory, Williams	3 – Bowie, Gregory	Comcast Center (12,178); College Park, MD
11/26/10*; 8:00 pm, CSN		Elon	W 76–57	5–2	24 – Williams	13 – Williams	7 – Bowie	Comcast Center (12,069); College Park, MD
12/01/10*; 9:15 pm, ESPN2		at Penn State; ACC–Big Ten Challenge	W 62–39	6–2	15 – Williams	11 – Williams	6 – Bowie	Bryce Jordan Center (9,078); University Park, PA
12/05/10*; 8:00 pm, MASN/FSN		vs. Temple; BB&T Classic	L 61–64	6–3	17 – Williams	11 – Williams	6 – Howard	Verizon Center; Washington, D.C.
12/08/10*; 7:30 pm, CSN		UNC Greensboro	W 99–56	7–3	23 – Williams	13 – Williams	5 – Tucker	Comcast Center (12,788); College Park, MD
12/12/10; 4:00 pm, FSN		Boston College	L 75–79	7–4 (0–1)	27 – Williams	13 – Williams	7 – Bowie	Comcast Center (15,851); College Park, MD
12/22/10*; 8:00 pm, TerpsTV		NJIT	W 89–50	8–4	14 – Gregory, Williams	12 – Williams	6 – Tucker	Comcast Center (11,689); College Park, MD
12/29/10*; 8:00 pm, TerpsTV		North Florida	W 85–62	9–4	17 – Williams	11 – Williams	6 – Mosley	Comcast Center (13,894); College Park, MD
01/04/11*; 8:00 pm, CSN/NESN		Colgate	W 95–40	10–4	16 – Bowie	11 – Williams	5 – Bowie	Comcast Center (12,814); College Park, MD
01/09/11; 8:00 pm, FSN		at No. 1 Duke	L 64–71	10–5 (0–2)	23 – Williams	13 – Williams	5 – Bowie, Stoglin	Cameron Indoor Stadium (9,314); Durham, NC
01/12/11; 8:00 pm, Raycom		at Wake Forest	W 74–55	11–5 (1–2)	21 – Tucker	15 – Williams	4 – Howard, Tucker	LJVM Coliseum (10,307); Winston-Salem, NC
01/15/11*; 1:00 pm, CBS		at No. 7 Villanova	L 66–74	11–6	25 – Williams	14 – Williams	8 – Stoglin	Wells Fargo Center (17,477); Philadelphia, PA
01/20/11; 9:00 pm, ESPN/ESPN2		Virginia Tech	L 57–74	11–7 (1–3)	13 – Tucker	11 – Williams	4 – Gregory	Comcast Center (17,950); College Park, MD
01/22/11; 2:30 pm, Raycom		Clemson	W 79–77	12–7 (2–3)	16 – Williams	11 – Williams	5 – Bowie	Comcast Center (17,950); College Park, MD
01/27/11; 7:00 pm, CSN		at Virginia	W 66–42	13–7 (3–3)	22 – Bowie	6 – Williams	4 – Howard	John Paul Jones Arena (10,257); Charlottesville, VA
01/30/11; 7:45 pm, FSN		at Georgia Tech	W 74–63	14–7 (4–3)	21 – Williams	15 – Williams	3 – Mosley	Alexander Memorial Coliseum (6,257); Atlanta, GA
02/02/11; 9:00 pm, ESPN		No. 5 Duke	L 62–80	14–8 (4–4)	20 – Williams	10 – Williams	5 – Bowie	Comcast Center (17,950); College Park, MD
02/05/11; 1:00 pm, Raycom		Wake Forest	W 91–70	15–8 (5–4)	27 – Williams	15 – Williams	8 – Howard	Comcast Center (17,950); College Park, MD
02/09/11*; 8:00 pm, TerpsTV		Longwood	W 106–52	16–8	20 – Mosley	11 – Gregory, Williams	6 – Bowie	Comcast Center (14,526); College Park, MD
02/12/11; 1:00 pm, Raycom		at Boston College	L 72–76	16–9 (5–5)	15 – Gregory	8 – Williams	7 – Stoglin	Conte Forum (8,606); Chestnut Hill, MA
02/15/11; 8:00 pm, Raycom		at Virginia Tech	L 83–91	16–10 (5–6)	25 – Stoglin	9 – Williams	6 – Stoglin	Cassell Coliseum (9,686); Blacksburg, VA
02/20/11; 5:30 pm, FSN		NC State	W 87–80	17–10 (6–6)	26 – Williams	10 – Gregory	9 – Stoglin	Comcast Center (17,950); College Park, MD
02/23/11; 9:00 pm, Raycom		Florida State	W 78–62	18–10 (7–6)	17 – Stoglin	11 – Williams	6 – Bowie	Comcast Center (15,186); College Park, MD
02/27/11; 7:45 pm, FSN		at No. 19 North Carolina	L 76–87	18–11 (7–7)	28 – Stoglin	19 – Williams	3 – Bowie, Mosley, Stoglin	Dean Smith Center (20,853); Chapel Hill, NC
03/02/11; 7:00 pm, ESPNU		at Miami (FL)	L 66–80	18–12 (7–8)	20 – Stoglin	12 – Williams	5 – Stoglin	BankUnited Center (4,866); Coral Gables, FL
03/05/11; 2:00 pm, Raycom		Virginia	L 60–74	18–13 (7–9)	17 – Williams	6 – Williams	6 – Howard	Comcast Center (17,459); College Park, MD
ACC tournament
3/10/11; 7:00 pm, ESPN2	(7)	vs. (10) NC State; ACC First Round	W 75–67	19–13	16 – Williams	13 – Williams	3 – Stoglin, Williams	Greensboro Coliseum (23,381); Greensboro, NC
3/11/11; 7:00 pm, ESPN2	(7)	vs. (2) No. 5 Duke; ACC Quarterfinals	L 71–87	19–14	16 – Williams	16 – Williams	4 – Stoglin, Bowie	Greensboro Coliseum (23,381); Greensboro, NC
*Non-conference game. ^{#}Rankings from AP Poll. (#) Tournament seedings in parentheses. All times are in Eastern Time.

== Rankings ==
Poll	Pre	Wk 1	Wk 2	Wk 3	Wk 4	Wk 5	Wk 6	Wk 7	Wk 8	Wk 9	Wk 10	Wk 11	Wk 12	Wk 13	Wk 14	Wk 15	Wk 16	Wk 17	Wk 18	Final
AP	NR																			
Coaches	47																			
