= 2011 ACC men's basketball tournament =

- 2011 ACC Tournament logo
- Classification: Division I
- Season: 2010–11
- Teams: 12
- Site: Greensboro Coliseum; Greensboro, North Carolina
- Champions: Duke Blue Devils (19th title)
- Winning coach: Mike Krzyzewski (13th title)
- MVP: Nolan Smith (Duke)
- Television: ESPN/Raycom Sports

The 2011 ACC men's basketball tournament, a part of the 2010–11 NCAA Division I men's basketball season, took place from March 10 to March 13 at the Greensboro Coliseum in Greensboro, North Carolina.

In contrast to the upset-heavy tournament in 2010 where the 11 and 12 seeds reached the semifinals, there were only two games in the first two rounds in which the lower seed prevailed. Some notable games included the first round game between Miami and Virginia. The Cavaliers held a 10-point lead with 42 seconds left, but the Hurricanes scored 10 straight points at the end of regulation to send the game to overtime, where Miami eventually won. In the quarterfinal game between Florida State and Virginia Tech, the Hokies' Erick Green hit a shot to put Virginia Tech up 1 with 4.7 seconds left. Derwin Kitchen then hit what appeared to be the game-winning shot for the Seminoles, but the shot was waved off after review, and Virginia Tech advanced.

For the first time in 10 years, Duke and North Carolina played each other in the championship game. The top-seeded Tar Heels had come back from double-digit deficits in their victories against Miami and Clemson. Duke started strong as well, scoring the first 8 points and taking a 14-point lead at halftime. However, Duke did not relinquish their lead in the second half, as North Carolina never got closer than 9. Duke won, 75-58, to give the Blue Devils their 19th ACC championship, the most in ACC history. This title also tied Duke coach Mike Krzyzewski with former UNC coach Dean Smith for the most ACC championships, each having won 13.

== Ticket policy ==
The ACC implemented a new ticket policy in hopes to sell out more of the Greensboro Coliseum's approximately 23,000 seats. In previous years, each school was allotted an equal number of ticket books for distribution. This left large numbers of tickets unsold as some schools, such as Boston College, Miami, and Florida State, do not have large numbers of fans who make the trip to Greensboro for the tournament. In response, the ACC issued more ticket books to schools who traditionally sold the majority of their ticket books.

== Seeding ==
2010–11 ACC men's basketball standings
	Conf.				Overall
Team	W		L	PCT	W		L	PCT
No. 7 North Carolina	14	–	2	.875	29	–	8	.784
No. 3 Duke †	13	–	3	.813	32	–	5	.865
Florida State	11	–	5	.688	23	–	11	.676
Clemson	9	–	7	.563	22	–	12	.647
Boston College	9	–	7	.563	21	–	13	.618
Virginia Tech	9	–	7	.563	22	–	12	.647
Maryland	7	–	9	.438	19	–	14	.576
Virginia	7	–	9	.438	16	–	15	.516
Miami (FL)	6	–	10	.375	21	–	15	.583
NC State	5	–	11	.313	15	–	16	.484
Georgia Tech	5	–	11	.313	13	–	18	.419
Wake Forest	1	–	15	.063	8	–	24	.250
† 2011 ACC tournament winner As of March 27, 2011; Rankings from AP poll

Teams are seeded based on the final regular season standings, with ties broken under an ACC policy.

2011 ACC Men's Basketball Tournament seeds
Seed	School	Conf.	Over.	Tiebreaker
1†‡	North Carolina	14–2	24–6	
2†	Duke	13–3	27–4	
3†	Florida State	11–5	21–9	
4†	Clemson	9–7	20–10	1–0 vs. BC, 1–0 vs. VT
5	Boston College	9–7	19–12	2–0 vs. VT, 0–1 vs. CLEM
6	Virginia Tech	9–7	19–10	0–1 vs. CLEM, 0–2 vs. BC
7	Maryland	7–9	18–13	1–0 vs. FSU
8	Virginia	7–9	16–14	0–1 vs. FSU
9	Miami	6–10	18–13	
10	North Carolina State	5–11	15–15	1–0 vs. GT
11	Georgia Tech	5–11	13–17	0–1 vs. NCSU
12	Wake Forest	1–15	8–23	
‡ – ACC tournament No. 1 seed. † – Received a bye in the conference tournament. Overall records are as of the end of the regular season.

== Schedule ==
Session	Game	Time*	Matchup^{#}	Television	Attendance
First Round - Thursday, March 10
1	1	noon	#8 Virginia vs. #9 Miami	Raycom	23,381
1	2	2:00pm	#5 Boston College vs. #12 Wake Forest	Raycom	23,381
2	3	7:00pm	#7 Maryland vs. #10 North Carolina State	ESPN2	23,381
2	4	9:00pm	#6 Virginia Tech vs. #11 Georgia Tech	Raycom	23,381
Quarterfinals - Friday, March 11
3	5	noon	#1 North Carolina vs. #9 Miami	ESPN2/Raycom	23,381
3	6	2:00pm	#4 Clemson vs. #5 Boston College	ESPN2/Raycom	23,381
4	7	7:00pm	#2 Duke vs. #7 Maryland	ESPN2/Raycom	23,381
4	8	9:00pm	#3 Florida State vs. #6 Virginia Tech	ESPN2/Raycom	23,381
Semifinals - Saturday, March 12
5	9	1:00pm	#1 North Carolina vs. #4 Clemson	ESPN/Raycom	23,381
5	10	3:00pm	#2 Duke vs. #6 Virginia Tech	ESPN/Raycom	23,381
Championship Game - Sunday, March 13
6	11	1:00pm	#1 North Carolina vs.#2 Duke	ESPN/Raycom	
*Game Times in ET. #-Rankings denote tournament seeding.

== Bracket ==
First round Thursday, March 10, 2011
8	Virginia	62
9	Miami	69^{OT}
5	Boston College	81
12	Wake Forest	67
7	Maryland	75
10	NC State	67
6	Virginia Tech	59
11	Georgia Tech	43

Quarterfinals; Friday, March 11, 2011
1	#6 North Carolina	61
9	Miami	59
4	Clemson	70
5	Boston College	47
2	#5 Duke	87
7	Maryland	71
3	Florida State	51
6	Virginia Tech	52

Semifinals; Saturday, March 12, 2011
1	#6 North Carolina	92^{OT}
4	Clemson	87
2	#5 Duke	77
6	Virginia Tech	63

Championship Game; Sunday, March 13, 2011
1	#6 North Carolina	58
2	#5 Duke	75

== Awards and honors ==
Tournament MVP
Nolan Smith, Duke

All-Tournament Team

First Team
Nolan Smith, Duke
Kyle Singler, Duke
Harrison Barnes, North Carolina
Tyler Zeller, North Carolina
Demontez Stitt, Clemson

Second Team
Miles Plumlee, Duke
Seth Curry, Duke
John Henson, North Carolina
Kendall Marshall, North Carolina
Malcolm Delaney, Virginia Tech
