= 2010–11 Miami Hurricanes men's basketball team =

American college basketball season

2010–11 Miami Hurricanes men's basketball

Las Vegas Holiday Hoops Classic champions

NIT, Quarterfinals
- Conference: Atlantic Coast Conference
- Record: 21–15 (6–10 ACC)
- Head coach: Frank Haith (7th season)
- Assistant coaches: Jorge Fernandez (7th season); Michael Schwartz (6th season); Jake Morton (4th season)
- Home arena: BankUnited Center

2010–11 ACC men's basketball standings
	Conf.				Overall
Team	W		L	PCT	W		L	PCT
No. 7 North Carolina	14	–	2	.875	29	–	8	.784
No. 3 Duke †	13	–	3	.813	32	–	5	.865
Florida State	11	–	5	.688	23	–	11	.676
Clemson	9	–	7	.563	22	–	12	.647
Boston College	9	–	7	.563	21	–	13	.618
Virginia Tech	9	–	7	.563	22	–	12	.647
Maryland	7	–	9	.438	19	–	14	.576
Virginia	7	–	9	.438	16	–	15	.516
Miami (FL)	6	–	10	.375	21	–	15	.583
NC State	5	–	11	.313	15	–	16	.484
Georgia Tech	5	–	11	.313	13	–	18	.419
Wake Forest	1	–	15	.063	8	–	24	.250
† 2011 ACC tournament winner As of March 27, 2011; Rankings from AP poll

The 2010–11 Miami Hurricanes men's basketball team represented the University of Miami during the 2010–11 NCAA Division I men's basketball season. The Hurricanes, led by 7th-year head coach Frank Haith, played their home games at the BankUnited Center and were members of the Atlantic Coast Conference. They finished the season 21–15 and 6–10 in ACC play to finish in ninth place. They defeated Virginia in the first round of the ACC Basketball tournament before falling to North Carolina in the quarterfinals. They were invited to the 2011 National Invitation Tournament, where they defeated Florida Atlantic and Missouri State before falling in the quarterfinals to Alabama.

== Previous season ==
The Hurricanes finished the 2009–10 season 20–13 overall, 4–12 in ACC play. They were not invited to either the NCAA tournament or the NIT.

=== Departures ===
Departures
Name	Number	Pos.	Height	Weight	Year	Hometown	Reason for departure
Antoine Allen	12	G	6'1"	184	Freshman	Baltimore, MD	Transferred to Palm Beach State College
Cyrus McGowan	20	F	6'9"	237	Senior	Brooksville, MS	Graduated
Dwayne Collins	21	F	6'9"	241	Senior	Miami, FL	Graduated
James Dews	23	G	6'4"	213	Senior	Cincinnati, OH	Graduated

=== Incoming transfers ===
Incoming transfers
Name	Number	Pos.	Height	Weight	Year	Hometown	Previous school
Trey McKinney-Jones	4	G	6'5"	216	Junior	Milwaukee, WI	Missouri-Kansas City
Kenny Kadji	21	F	6'11"	251	RS sophomore	Douala, Cameroon	Florida

=== 2010 recruiting class ===
College recruiting
Name	Hometown	School	Height	Weight	Commit date
Rion Brown; G	Hinesville, GA	Liberty County HS	6 ft 5 in (1.96 m)	187 lb (85 kg)	Aug 4, 2009
Rion Brown; G	Recruit ratings: Rivals:				
Rafael Akpejiori; C	Lagos, Nigeria	Sunrise Christian Academy	6 ft 9 in (2.06 m)	230 lb (100 kg)	Oct 20, 2009
Rafael Akpejiori; C	Recruit ratings: Rivals:				
Erik Swoope; F	Lake Elsinore, CA	Harvard-Westlake School	6 ft 5 in (1.96 m)	220 lb (100 kg)	Apr 15, 2010
Erik Swoope; F	Recruit ratings: No ratings found				
Overall recruit ranking:
Note: In many cases, Scout, Rivals, 247Sports, On3, and ESPN may conflict in their listings of height and weight.; In these cases, the average was taken. ESPN grades are on a 100-point scale.; Sources: "Miami Hurricanes 2010 Basketball Commitments". Rivals.; "ESPN". ESPN.; "2010 Team Ranking". Rivals.

== Roster ==
2010–11 Miami Hurricanes men's basketball team
Players
Coaches

Pos.	#	Name	Height	Weight	Year	Hometown
G	1	Durand Scott	6 ft 5 in (1.96 m)	202 lb (92 kg)	So	Bronx, NY
G	3	Malcolm Grant	6 ft 1 in (1.85 m)	188 lb (85 kg)	Jr	Brooklyn, NC
G	4	Trey McKinney-Jones (I) (redshirt)	6 ft 5 in (1.96 m)	216 lb (98 kg)	Jr	Milwaukee, WI
F	10	Raphael Akpejiori	6 ft 10 in (2.08 m)	230 lb (104 kg)	Fr	Lagos, Nigeria
G	11	Ryan Quigtar (W)	5 ft 11 in (1.8 m)	180 lb (82 kg)	Jr	Skyway, WA
G	12	Justin Heller (W)	6 ft 2 in (1.88 m)	185 lb (84 kg)	Fr	Boca Raton, FL
G	15	Rion Brown	6 ft 6 in (1.98 m)	194 lb (88 kg)	Fr	Hinesville, GA
F	21	Kenny Kadji (I)	6 ft 11 in (2.11 m)	251 lb (114 kg)	RS So	Douala, Cameroon
F	22	Donnavan Kirk	6 ft 9 in (2.06 m)	227 lb (103 kg)	RS Fr	Pontiac, MI
G	25	Garrius Adams	6 ft 6 in (1.98 m)	200 lb (91 kg)	So	Apex, NC
F	30	Adrian Thomas	6 ft 7 in (2.01 m)	226 lb (103 kg)	GS	Pembroke Pines, FL
G	31	DeQuan Jones	6 ft 8 in (2.03 m)	221 lb (100 kg)	Jr	Stone Mountain, GA
F	32	Erik Swoope	6 ft 6 in (1.98 m)	230 lb (104 kg)	Fr	Lake Elsinore, CA
C	42	Reggie Johnson	6 ft 10 in (2.08 m)	284 lb (129 kg)	So	Winston-Salem, NC
C	45	Julian Gamble	6 ft 10 in (2.08 m)	265 lb (120 kg)	Jr	Durham, NC

Head coach

- Frank Haith (Elon)

Assistant coach(es)

- Jorge Fernandez (Stetson)
- Jake Morton (Miami (FL))
- Michael Schwartz (Texas)

Legend

- (C) Team captain
- (S) Suspended
- (I) Ineligible
- (W) Walk-on
- Injured
- Current redshirt

== Schedule ==
Date time, TV	Rank^{#}	Opponent^{#}	Result	Record	High points	High rebounds	High assists	Site (attendance) city, state
Exhibition
November 3, 2010*		Barry	W 102–33	-	32 – Tied	10 – Kirk	– -	BankUnited Center; Coral Gables, Florida
November 8, 2010*		Florida Southern	W 90–65	-	14 – Scott	7 – Johnson	– -	BankUnited Center; Coral Gables, Florida
Regular season
November 12, 2010*; 7:30 pm		Jacksonville	W 89–77	1–0	23 – Grant	8 – Tied	6 – Scott	BankUnited Center (3,949); Coral Gables, FL
November 15, 2010*; 11:59 pm		at No. 19 Memphis	L 78–82	1–1	20 – Scott	12 – Johnson	3 – Grant	FedEx Forum (17,973); Memphis, TN
November 19, 2010*; 7:00 pm		North Carolina Central	W 88–65	2–1	17 – Brown	10 – Johnson	4 – Scott	BankUnited Center (4,173); Coral Gables, FL
November 21, 2010*; 2:00 pm		at Rutgers	L 45–61	2–2	12 – Johnson	14 – Johnson	2 – Thomas	Louis Brown Athletic Center (4,753); Piscataway, NJ
November 24, 2010*; 7:30 pm		McNeese State	W 79–59	3–2	16 – Brown	9 – Johnson	9 – Grant	BankUnited Center (4,337); Coral Gables, FL
November 27, 2010*; 7:05 pm		at Florida Gulf Coast	W 87–75	4–2	20 – Grant	10 – Johnson	10 – Johnson	Alico Arena (2,862); Fort Myers, FL
November 30, 2010*; 7:00 pm		Ole Miss	W 86–73	5–2	27 – Scott	10 – Johnson	6 – Scott	BankUnited Center (4,432); Coral Gables, FL
December 4, 2010*; 4:00 pm		West Virginia	W 79–76	6–2	26 – Grant	7 – Johnson	3 – Grant	BankUnited Center (6,548); Coral Gables, FL
December 12, 2010*; 4:00 pm		Stetson	W 68–54	7–2	13 – Thomas	7 – Johnson	5 – Adams	BankUnited Center (4,551); Coral Gables, FL
December 18, 2010*; 1:00 pm		vs. UCF; Orange Bowl Basketball Classic	L 78–84	7–3	19 – Grant	6 – Johnson	5 – Scott	BankAtlantic Center (1,893); Sunrise, FL
December 21, 2010*; 5:15 pm		vs. Oral Roberts; Las Vegas Holiday Hoops Classic	W 69–56	8–3	15 – Grant	12 – Johnson	3 – Scott	South Point Arena (1,202); Enterprise, NV
December 22, 2010*; 1:00 pm		vs. Rice; Las Vegas Holiday Hoops Classic	W 73–67	9–3	25 – Grant	6 – Johnson	3 – Grant	South Point Arena (1,095); Enterprise, NV
December 23, 2010*; 3:00 pm		vs. Akron; Las Vegas Holiday Hoops Classic	W 69–61	10–3	21 – Johnson	12 – Johnson	3 – Grant	South Point Arena (974); Enterprise, NV
December 30, 2010*; 6:00 pm		Pepperdine	W 94–59	11–3	22 – Grant	15 – Johnson	8 – Grant	BankUnited Center (2,793); Coral Gables, FL
January 2, 2011; 7:45 pm		at No. 1 Duke	L 63–74	11–4 (0–1)	22 – Johnson	9 – Johnson	5 – Carter	Cameron Indoor Stadium (9,314); Durham, NC
January 8, 2011; 6:00 pm		at Clemson	L 72–79	11–5 (0–2)	24 – Scott	8 – Johnson	3 – Adams	Littlejohn Coliseum (8,592); Clemson, SC
January 15, 2011; 6:00 pm		Boston College	W 72–71	12–5 (1–2)	19 – Scott	9 – Johnson	5 – Grant	BankUnited Center (6,107); Coral Gables, FL
January 19, 2011; 9:00 pm		Florida State	L 53–55	12–6 (1–3)	20 – Grant	9 – Johnson	3 – Grant	BankUnited Center (6,600); Coral Gables, FL
January 23, 2011; 12:00 pm		at NC State	L 70–72	12–7 (1–4)	23 – Grant	14 – Johnson	3 – Grant	RBC Center (15,222); Raleigh, NC
January 26, 2011; 7:30 pm		North Carolina	L 71–74	12–8 (1–5)	18 – Scott	13 – Johnson	5 – Grant	BankUnited Center (6,026); Coral Gables, FL
January 30, 2011; 5:30 pm		at Virginia Tech	L 68–72	12–9 (1–6)	21 – Scott	10 – Johnson	5 – Scott	Cassell Coliseum (9,847); Blacksburg, VA
February 3, 2011; 7:00 pm		Georgia Tech	W 59–57	13–9 (2–6)	15 – Grant	10 – Johnson	4 – Scott	BankUnited Center (4,865); Coral Gables, FL
February 5, 2011; 2:00 pm		Virginia	W 70–68 ^{OT}	14–9 (3–6)	20 – Thomas	10 – Thomas	3 – Grant	BankUnited Center (4,776); Coral Gables, FL
February 9, 2011; 7:00 pm		at Wake Forest	W 74–73	15–9 (4–6)	25 – Johnson	7 – Tied	2 – Tied	LJVM Coliseum (9,249); Winston-Salem, NC
February 13, 2011; 6:45 pm		No. 5 Duke	L 71–81	15–10 (4–7)	16 – Tied	7 – Johnson	8 – Scott	BankUnited Center (7,972); Coral Gables, FL
February 15, 2011*; 7:00 pm		at UNC Greensboro	W 78–63	16–10	18 – Thomas	12 – Scott	3 – Grant	Greensboro Coliseum (3,102); Greensboro, NC
February 20, 2011; 3:30 pm		Clemson	L 59–63	16–11 (4–8)	16 – Scott	9 – Johnson	5 – Grant	BankUnited Center (5,846); Coral Gables, FL
February 23, 2011; 7:00 pm		at Boston College	W 73–64	17–11 (5–8)	15 – Tied	6 – Tied	4 – Tied	Conte Forum (6,138); Chestnut Hill, MA
February 26, 2011; 2:00 pm		at Florida State	L 59–65	17–12 (5–9)	19 – Grant	12 – Johnson	3 – Adams	Donald L. Tucker Civic Center (11,531); Tallahassee, FL
March 2, 2011; 7:00 pm		Maryland	W 80–66	18–12 (6–9)	19 – Brown	16 – Johnson	6 – Scott	BankUnited Center (4,866); Coral Gables, FL
March 6, 2011; 2:30 pm		at Georgia Tech	L 57–66	18–13 (6–10)	14 – Thomas	12 – Johnson	3 – Brown	Alexander Memorial Coliseum (8,025); Atlanta, GA
ACC tournament
March 10, 2011*; 12:00 pm	(9)	vs. (8) Virginia; First Round	W 69–62 ^{OT}	19–13	16 – Grant	6 – Tied	7 – Grant	Greensboro Coliseum (23,381); Greensboro, NC
March 11, 2011*; 12:00 pm	(9)	vs. (1) North Carolina; Quarterfinals	L 59–61	19–14	16 – Grant	5 – Tied	5 – Grant	Greensboro Coliseum (23,381); Greensboro, NC
National Invitation Tournament
March 16, 2011*; 7:30 pm	(2 A)	(7 A) Florida Atlantic; First Round	W 85–62	20–14	23 – Grant	20 – Johnson	4 – Scott	BankUnited Center (1,509); Coral Gables, FL
March 21, 2011*; 7:00 pm	(2 A)	(3 A) Missouri State; Second Round	W 81–72	21–14	20 – Scott	9 – Johnson	4 – Scott	BankUnited Center (1,623); Coral Gables, FL
March 23, 2011*; 9:00 pm	(2 A)	at (1 A) Alabama; Quarterfinals	L 64–79	21–15	19 – Scott	7 – Johnson	2 – Scott	Coleman Coliseum (8,612); Tuscaloosa, AL
*Non-conference game. ^{#}Rankings from AP Poll. (#) Tournament seedings in parentheses. A=NIT Alabama bracket. All times are in Eastern Time.
