= 2010–11 Clemson Tigers men's basketball team =

American college basketball season

2010–11 Clemson Tigers men's basketball

NCAA tournament, Round of 64
- Conference: Atlantic Coast Conference
- Record: 22–12 (9–7 ACC)
- Head coach: Brad Brownell
- Assistant coaches: Rick Ray; Earl Grant; Mike Winiecki
- Home arena: Littlejohn Coliseum

2010–11 ACC men's basketball standings
	Conf.				Overall
Team	W		L	PCT	W		L	PCT
No. 7 North Carolina	14	–	2	.875	29	–	8	.784
No. 3 Duke †	13	–	3	.813	32	–	5	.865
Florida State	11	–	5	.688	23	–	11	.676
Clemson	9	–	7	.563	22	–	12	.647
Boston College	9	–	7	.563	21	–	13	.618
Virginia Tech	9	–	7	.563	22	–	12	.647
Maryland	7	–	9	.438	19	–	14	.576
Virginia	7	–	9	.438	16	–	15	.516
Miami (FL)	6	–	10	.375	21	–	15	.583
NC State	5	–	11	.313	15	–	16	.484
Georgia Tech	5	–	11	.313	13	–	18	.419
Wake Forest	1	–	15	.063	8	–	24	.250
† 2011 ACC tournament winner As of March 27, 2011; Rankings from AP poll

The 2010–11 Clemson Tigers men's basketball team represented Clemson University during the 2010–11 NCAA Division I men's basketball season. The Tigers, led by first-year head coach Brad Brownell, played their home games at Littlejohn Coliseum and were members of the Atlantic Coast Conference. They finished the season 22–12, 9–7 in ACC play. They lost in the semifinals of the 2011 ACC men's basketball tournament to North Carolina. They received an at-large bid to the 2011 NCAA Division I men's basketball tournament where they defeated UAB in the new First Four round before falling to West Virginia in the second round.

== Roster ==
Number	Name	Position	Height	Weight	Year	Hometown
2	Demontez Stitt	Guard	6–2	180	Senior	Matthews, North Carolina
3	Zavier Anderson	Guard	5–9	170	Senior	Greenville, South Carolina
4	Jonah Baize	Forward	6–6	195	Senior	Evansville, Indiana
5	Tanner Smith	Guard	6–5	210	Junior	Alpharetta, Georgia
10	Catalin Baciu	Center	7–2	255	Junior	Cluj-Napoca, Romania
11	Andre Young	Guard	5–9	175	Junior	Albany, Georgia
12	Cory Stanton	Guard	5–10	175	Freshman	Springfield, Tennessee
21	Bryan Narcisse	Forward	6–6	220	Junior	North Augusta, South Carolina
24	Milton Jennings	Forward	6–9	225	Sophomore	Summerville, South Carolina
31	Devin Booker	Forward/Center	6–8	245	Sophomore	Whitmire, South Carolina
44	DeAndre Hopkins	Guard	6–2	205	Freshman	Central, South Carolina
45	Jerai Grant	Forward/Center	6–8	230	Senior	Bowie, Maryland

== Schedule ==
Date time, TV	Rank^{#}	Opponent^{#}	Result	Record	Site (attendance) city, state
Exhibition
11/05/2010*; 7:00 pm		Belmont Abbey	W 96–57	–	Littlejohn Coliseum (5,000); Clemson, SC
Regular season
11/12/2010*; 8:00 pm		Western Carolina	W 87–64	1–0	Littlejohn Coliseum (7,920); Clemson, SC
11/15/2010*; 8:00 pm		Wofford	W 78–70	2–0	Littlejohn Coliseum (7,900); Clemson, SC
11/19/2010*; 3:30 pm		vs. Long Beach State; Paradise Jam tournament quarterfinals	W 69–55	3–0	Sports and Fitness Center (N/A); St. Thomas, VI
11/21/2010*; 6:00 pm, FCS		vs. Old Dominion; Paradise Jam Tournament semifinals	L 60–61	3–1	Sports and Fitness Center (N/A); St. Thomas, VI
11/22/2010*; 6:00 pm, FSN		vs. Seton Hall; Paradise Jam Tournament 3rd place game	W 64–58 ^{OT}	4–1	Sports and Fitness Center (N/A); St. Thomas, VI
11/26/2010*; 7:00 pm		South Carolina State	W 69–54	5–1	Littlejohn Coliseum (7,825); Clemson, SC
11/30/2010*; 9:00 pm, ESPN2		Michigan; ACC–Big Ten Challenge	L 61–69	5–2	Littlejohn Coliseum (7,237); Clemson, SC
12/05/2010*; 4:00 pm, FSSO/SunSp		at South Carolina	L 60–64	5–3	Colonial Life Arena (10,177); Columbia, SC
12/12/2010; 6:15 pm, FSN		at Florida State	L 69–75	5–4 (0–1)	Donald L. Tucker Center (7,015); Tallahassee, FL
12/17/2010*; 7:00 pm		Savannah State	W 61–40	6–4	Littlejohn Coliseum (5,500); Clemson, SC
12/19/2010*; 2:00 pm, FSSO		UNC Greensboro	W 71–61	7–4	Littlejohn Coliseum (5,500); Clemson, SC
12/22/2010*; 7:00 pm, FSSO/NESN		at College of Charleston	W 66–59	8–4	Carolina First Arena (5,048); Charleston, SC
12/27/2010*; 7:00 pm		Delaware State	W 76–41	9–4	Littlejohn Coliseum (7,523); Clemson, SC
12/29/2010*; 7:00 pm		East Carolina	W 71–59	10–4	Littlejohn Coliseum (7,382); Clemson, SC
01/02/2011*; 4:00 pm		The Citadel	W 69–54	11–4	Littlejohn Coliseum (7,613); Clemson, SC
01/08/2011; 6:00 pm, ESPNU		Miami (FL)	W 79–72	12–4 (1–1)	Littlejohn Coliseum (8,592); Clemson, SC
01/12/2011; 7:00 pm, FSSO		Georgia Tech	W 87–72	13–4 (2–1)	Littlejohn Coliseum (10,000); Clemson, SC
01/18/2011; 8:00 pm, Raycom		at North Carolina	L 65–75	13–5 (2–2)	Dean E. Smith Center (20,352); Chapel Hill, NC
01/22/2011; 2:30 pm, Raycom		at Maryland	L 77–79	13–6 (2–3)	Comcast Center (17,950); College Park, MD
01/25/2011; 7:00 pm, ACCN		NC State	W 60–50	14–6 (3–3)	Littlejohn Coliseum (9,000); Clemson, SC
01/29/2011; 12:00 pm, Raycom		Florida State	W 62–44	15–6 (4–3)	Littlejohn Coliseum (10,000); Clemson, SC
02/02/2011; 9:00 pm, ESPNU		at Virginia	L 47–49	15–7 (4–4)	John Paul Jones Arena (8,684); Charlottesville, VA
02/05/2011; 1:00 pm, Raycom		at Georgia Tech	W 65–56	16–7 (5–4)	Alexander Memorial Coliseum (6,219); Atlanta, GA
02/8/2011; 9:00 pm, ESPNU		Boston College	W 77–69	17–7 (6–4)	Littlejohn Coliseum (8,925); Clemson, SC
02/12/2011; 1:00 pm, Raycom		No. 21 North Carolina	L 62–64	17–8 (6–5)	Littlejohn Coliseum (10,000); Clemson, SC
02/17/2011; 7:00 pm		at NC State	L 61–69	17–9 (6–6)	RBC Center (14,891); Raleigh, NC
02/20/2011; 3:30 pm, ESPNU		at Miami (FL)	W 63–59	18–9 (7–6)	BankUnited Center (5,846); Coral Gables, FL
02/26/2011; 4:00 pm, ACCN		Wake Forest	W 63–49	19–9 (8–6)	Littlejohn Coliseum (10,000); Clemson, SC
03/02/2011; 9:00 pm, ESPN		at No. 4 Duke	L 59–70	19–10 (8–7)	Cameron Indoor Stadium (9,314); Durham, NC
03/5/2011; 12:00 pm, ESPN2		Virginia Tech	W 69–60	20–10 (9–7)	Littlejohn Coliseum (10,000); Clemson, SC
ACC tournament
03/11/2011; 2:00 pm, ESPN2	(4)	vs. (5) Boston College; Quarterfinals	W 70–47	21–10	Greensboro Coliseum (23,381); Greensboro, NC
03/12/2011; 1:00 pm, ESPN	(4)	vs. (1) No. 7 North Carolina; Semifinals	L 87–92 ^{OT}	21–11	Greensboro Coliseum (23,381); Greensboro, NC
NCAA tournament
03/15/2011*; 9:00 pm, truTV	(12 E)	vs. (12 E) UAB; First Four	W 70–52	22–11	UD Arena (10,025); Dayton, OH
03/17/2011*; 12:15 pm, CBS	(12 E)	vs. (5 E) No. 22 West Virginia; Second Round	L 76–84	22–12	St. Pete Times Forum (14,835); Tampa, FL
*Non-conference game. ^{#}Rankings from AP Poll. (#) Tournament seedings in parentheses. E=NCAA East Region. All times are in Eastern Time.
