= 2010–11 Virginia Cavaliers men's basketball team =

American college basketball season

2010–11 Virginia Cavaliers men's basketball
- Conference: Atlantic Coast Conference
- Record: 16–15 (7–9 ACC)
- Head coach: Tony Bennett (2nd season)
- Associate head coach: Ritchie McKay (2nd season)
- Assistant coaches: Ron Sanchez (2nd season); Jason Williford (2nd season)
- Home arena: John Paul Jones Arena

2010–11 ACC men's basketball standings
	Conf.				Overall
Team	W		L	PCT	W		L	PCT
No. 7 North Carolina	14	–	2	.875	29	–	8	.784
No. 3 Duke †	13	–	3	.813	32	–	5	.865
Florida State	11	–	5	.688	23	–	11	.676
Clemson	9	–	7	.563	22	–	12	.647
Boston College	9	–	7	.563	21	–	13	.618
Virginia Tech	9	–	7	.563	22	–	12	.647
Maryland	7	–	9	.438	19	–	14	.576
Virginia	7	–	9	.438	16	–	15	.516
Miami (FL)	6	–	10	.375	21	–	15	.583
NC State	5	–	11	.313	15	–	16	.484
Georgia Tech	5	–	11	.313	13	–	18	.419
Wake Forest	1	–	15	.063	8	–	24	.250
† 2011 ACC tournament winner As of March 27, 2011; Rankings from AP poll

The 2010–11 Virginia Cavaliers men's basketball team represented the University of Virginia during the 2010–11 NCAA Division I men's basketball season. The team was led by head coach Tony Bennett, in his second season, and played their home games at John Paul Jones Arena as members of the Atlantic Coast Conference.

== Last season ==
The Cavaliers improved in their first season under Tony Bennett, with a record of 16–15, and an in-conference record of 7–9.

== Roster ==
2010–11 Virginia Cavaliers men's basketball team
Players
Coaches

Pos.	#	Name	Height	Weight	Year	Previous school	Hometown
G	1	Jontel Evans	5 ft 11 in (1.8 m)	190 lb (86 kg)	So	Bethel	Hampton, Virginia
G	2	Mustapha Farrakhan	6 ft 4 in (1.93 m)	181 lb (82 kg)	Sr	Thornton Township	Harvey, Illinois
F	4	Will Regan	6 ft 8 in (2.03 m)	222 lb (101 kg)	Fr	Nichols School	Williamsville, New York
C	5	Assane Sene	7 ft 0 in (2.13 m)	239 lb (108 kg)	Jr	South Kent School	Saint-Louis, Senegal
G	12	Joe Harris	6 ft 6 in (1.98 m)	202 lb (92 kg)	Fr	Chelan	Chelan, Washington
G	13	Sammy Zeglinski	6 ft 1 in (1.85 m)	185 lb (84 kg)	Jr	William Penn Charter	Philadelphia
G	15	Billy Baron	6 ft 2 in (1.88 m)	192 lb (87 kg)	Fr	Bishop Hendricken	East Greenwich, Rhode Island
F	22	Will Sherrill	6 ft 9 in (2.06 m)	226 lb (103 kg)	Sr	Phillips Academy	New York City
F	23	Mike Scott (injured) (redshirt)	6 ft 8 in (2.03 m)	242 lb (110 kg)	Sr	Deep Creek/Hargrave Military	Chesapeake, Virginia
G	24	KT Harrell	6 ft 4 in (1.93 m)	204 lb (93 kg)	Fr	Brewbaker Technology	Montgomery, Alabama
F	25	Akil Mitchell	6 ft 8 in (2.03 m)	221 lb (100 kg)	Fr	Charlotte Christian	Charlotte, North Carolina
G	32	Thomas Rogers	6 ft 6 in (1.98 m)	200 lb (91 kg)	Fr	Fork Union Military	Farmville, Virginia
F	34	James Johnson (redshirt)	6 ft 9 in (2.06 m)	234 lb (106 kg)	Fr	Elsinore	Wildomar, California

Head coach

- Tony Bennett (Green Bay)

Assistant coach(es)

- Ritchie McKay (Seattle Pacific)
- Ron Sanchez (SUNY-Oneonta)
- Jason Williford (Virginia)

Athletic trainer(s)

- Ethan Saliba (Kansas)

Legend

- (C) Team captain
- (S) Suspended
- (I) Ineligible
- (W) Walk-on
- Injured
- Current redshirt

Roster
Last update: 13 December 2014

== Schedule ==
Date time, TV	Rank^{#}	Opponent^{#}	Result	Record	Site (attendance) city, state
Exhibition
Nov. 6*; 2:00 pm		Roanoke	W 82–50	—	John Paul Jones Arena; Charlottesville, Virginia
Regular season
Nov. 12*; 7:00 pm		William & Mary	W 76–52	1–0	John Paul Jones Arena (10,003); Charlottesville, Virginia
Nov. 15*; 7:00 pm		USC Upstate	W 74–54	2–0	John Paul Jones Arena (7,751); Charlottesville, Virginia
Nov. 18*; 10:30 pm, FSN		at Stanford	L 60–81	2–1	Maples Pavilion (5,314); Stanford, California
Nov. 22*; 11:59 pm, ESPN2		vs. No. 13 Washington; Maui Invitational	L 63–106	2–2	Lahaina Civic Center (2,400); Lahaina, HI
Nov. 23*; 4:30 pm, ESPN2		vs. Oklahoma; Maui Invitational	W 74–56	3–2	Lahaina Civic Center (2,400); Lahaina, HI
Nov. 24*; 7:30 pm, ESPNU		vs. Wichita State; Maui Invitational 5th place game	L 58–70	3–3	Lahaina Civic Center (2,400); Lahaina, HI
Nov. 29*; 7:00 pm, ESPN2		at No. 15 Minnesota; ACC–Big Ten Challenge	W 87–79	4–3	Williams Arena (12,089); Minneapolis
Dec. 5; 6:00 pm, FSN		at Virginia Tech	W 57–54	5–3 (1–0)	Cassell Coliseum (9,847); Blacksburg, Virginia
Dec. 7*; 7:00 pm		Radford	W 54–44	6–3	John Paul Jones Arena (8242); Charlottesville, Virginia
Dec. 17*; 8:00 pm, CSN		Oregon	W 63–48	7–3	John Paul Jones Arena (9,708); Charlottesville, Virginia
Dec. 20*; 7:00 pm		Norfolk State	W 50–49	8–3	John Paul Jones Arena (7,856); Charlottesville, Virginia
Dec. 22*; 7:00 pm		Seattle	L 53–59	8–4	John Paul Jones Arena (8,679); Charlottesville, Virginia
Dec. 30*; 8:00 pm, CSN		Iowa State	L 47–60	8–5	John Paul Jones Arena (10,032); Charlottesville, Virginia
Jan. 2*; 5:30 pm, FSN		LSU	W 64–50	9–5	John Paul Jones Arena (10,049); Charlottesville, Virginia
Jan. 4*; 6:00 pm		Howard	W 84–63	10–5	John Paul Jones Arena (7,687); Charlottesville, Virginia
Jan. 8 Noon, ACCN		North Carolina	L 56–62	10–6 (1–1)	John Paul Jones Arena (14,231); Charlottesville, Virginia
Jan. 15; 2:00 pm, ESPN		at No. 1 Duke	L 60–76	10–7 (1–2)	Cameron Indoor Stadium (9,314); Durham, North Carolina
Jan. 19; 7:00 pm		at Boston College	L 67–70	10–8 (1–3)	Conte Forum (4,628); Chestnut Hill
Jan. 22; Noon, ACCN		Georgia Tech	W 72–64	11–8 (2–3)	John Paul Jones Arena (11,885); Charlottesville, Virginia
Jan. 27; 7:00 pm, CSN		Maryland	L 42–66	11–9 (2–4)	John Paul Jones Arena (10,257); Charlottesville, Virginia
Jan. 29; 4:00 pm, ACCN		at Wake Forest	L 71–76	11–10 (2–5)	LJVM Coliseum (11,783); Winston-Salem, North Carolina
Feb. 2; 9:00 pm, ESPNU		Clemson	W 49–47	12–10 (3–5)	John Paul Jones Arena (8,684); Charlottesville, Virginia
Feb. 5; 2:00 pm		at Miami (FL)	L 68–70 ^{OT}	12–11 (3–6)	BankUnited Center (4,766); Coral Gables, Florida
Feb. 12; 3:00 pm, RSN		at Florida State	L 56–63	12–12 (3–7)	Donald L. Tucker Center (10,266); Tallahassee, Florida
Feb. 16; 7:00 pm, ESPN2		No. 5 Duke	L 41–56	12–13 (3–8)	John Paul Jones Arena (14,149); Charlottesville, Virginia
Feb. 19; 1:00 pm, ACCN		Virginia Tech	W 61–54	13–13 (4–8)	John Paul Jones Arena (13,769); Charlottesville, Virginia
Feb. 23; 7:00 pm, ESPNU		at Georgia Tech	W 62–56	14–13 (5–8)	Alexander Memorial Coliseum (5,537); Atlanta
Feb. 26; Noon, RSN		Boston College	L 44–63	14–14 (5–9)	John Paul Jones Arena (10,747); Charlottesville, Virginia
Mar. 1; 7:00 pm, RSN		NC State	W 69–58	15–14 (6–9)	John Paul Jones Arena (8,930); Charlottesville, Virginia
Mar. 5; 2:00 pm, ACCN		at Maryland	W 74–60	16–14 (7–9)	Comcast Center (17,459); College Park, Maryland
ACC tournament
Mar. 10; Noon, ESPN2	(8)	vs. (9) Miami (FL); ACC FirstRound	L 62–69 ^{OT}	16–15	Greensboro Coliseum; Greensboro, North Carolina
*Non-conference game. ^{#}Rankings from AP Poll. (#) Tournament seedings in parentheses. All times are in Eastern Time.
