= 2010–11 NC State Wolfpack men's basketball team =

American college basketball season

2010–11 NC State Wolfpack men's basketball
- Conference: Atlantic Coast Conference
- Record: 15–16 (5–11 ACC)
- Head coach: Sidney Lowe
- Assistant coaches: Monte Towe; Larry Harris; Pete Strickland
- Home arena: RBC Center

2010–11 ACC men's basketball standings
	Conf.				Overall
Team	W		L	PCT	W		L	PCT
No. 7 North Carolina	14	–	2	.875	29	–	8	.784
No. 3 Duke †	13	–	3	.813	32	–	5	.865
Florida State	11	–	5	.688	23	–	11	.676
Clemson	9	–	7	.563	22	–	12	.647
Boston College	9	–	7	.563	21	–	13	.618
Virginia Tech	9	–	7	.563	22	–	12	.647
Maryland	7	–	9	.438	19	–	14	.576
Virginia	7	–	9	.438	16	–	15	.516
Miami (FL)	6	–	10	.375	21	–	15	.583
NC State	5	–	11	.313	15	–	16	.484
Georgia Tech	5	–	11	.313	13	–	18	.419
Wake Forest	1	–	15	.063	8	–	24	.250
† 2011 ACC tournament winner As of March 27, 2011; Rankings from AP poll

The 2010–11 NC State Wolfpack men's basketball team represented NC State University in the 2010–11 men's college basketball season. The team was coached by Sidney Lowe and played its home games at the RBC Center in Raleigh, NC. The Wolfpack is a member of the Atlantic Coast Conference.

== Class of 2010 Commits ==
College recruiting information
Name	Hometown	School	Height	Weight	Commit date
Lorenzo Brown; SG	Chatham, Virginia	Hargrave Military Academy (VA)	6 ft 4 in (1.93 m)	175 lb (79 kg)	Jul 27, 2008
Lorenzo Brown; SG	Recruit ratings: Scout: Rivals: (95)				
Ryan Harrow; PG	Marietta, Georgia	Walton High School (GA)	5 ft 11.5 in (1.82 m)	156.5 lb (71.0 kg)	Jun 30, 2008
Ryan Harrow; PG	Recruit ratings: Scout: Rivals: (95)				
C. J. Leslie; PF	Raleigh, North Carolina	Word of God Christian Academy (NC)	6 ft 7.5 in (2.02 m)	195 lb (88 kg)	Apr 28, 2010
C. J. Leslie; PF	Recruit ratings: Scout: Rivals: (97)				
Overall recruit ranking: Scout: 5 Rivals: 5 ESPN: 7
Note: In many cases, Scout, Rivals, 247Sports, On3, and ESPN may conflict in their listings of height and weight.; In these cases, the average was taken. ESPN grades are on a 100-point scale.; Sources: "N.C. State Basketball Commitment List". Rivals.; "North Carolina State College Basketball Recruiting Commits". Scout.; "2010 Player Commits". ESPN.; "Scout.com Team Recruiting Rankings". Scout.; "2010 Team Ranking". Rivals.

== 2010–11 Roster ==
Note: Flags indicate national team eligibility at FIBA sanctioned events. Players may hold other non-FIBA nationality not displayed.

No.		Position	Player
2	(United States)	G	Lorenzo Brown
10	(Puerto Rico)	G	Javier González
12	(United States)	G	Ryan Harrow
1	(United States)	F	Richard Howell
4	(Germany)	G	Enrico Kufuor
5	(United States)	F	C. J. Leslie
0	(United States)	C	DeShawn Painter
25	(United States)	F	Kendall Smith
23	(United States)	F	Tracy Smith
14	(Australia)	C	Jordan Vandenberg
21	(United States)	G	C. J. Williams
15	(United States)	F	Scott Wood

== 2010–11 Schedule ==
Date time, TV	Rank^{#}	Opponent^{#}	Result	Record	Site (attendance) city, state
Exhibition
Nov 9*; 7:00 pm		Pfeiffer	W 111–73	—	Reynolds Coliseum; Raleigh, NC
Regular Season
Nov 12*; 7:00 pm		Tennessee Tech	W 82–69	1–0	RBC Center (15,450); Raleigh, NC
Nov 18*; 6:00 pm, MASN		vs. East Carolina; Charleston Classic/Rivalry	W 85–65	2–0	Carolina First Arena (2,639); Charleston, SC
Nov 19*; 6:00 pm, ESPNU		vs. George Mason; Charleston Classic	W 78–65	3–0	Carolina First Arena (4,120); Charleston, SC
Nov 21*; 7:30 pm, ESPNU		vs. No. 20 Georgetown; Charleston Classic	L 67–82	3–1	Carolina First Arena (4,631); Charleston, SC
Nov 27*; 6:00 pm, FSN		Fairleigh Dickinson	W 77–67	4–1	RBC Center (10,327); Raleigh, NC
Dec 1*; 7:15 pm, ESPN2		at Wisconsin; ACC–Big Ten Challenge	L 48–87	4–2	Kohl Center (17,230); Madison, WI
Dec 4*; 5:30 pm, ESPN2		at No. 8 Syracuse	L 59–65	4–3	Carrier Dome (22,334); Syracuse, NY
Dec 11*; 2:00 pm		USC Upstate	W 79–60	5–3	Reynolds Coliseum (5,178); Raleigh, NC
Dec 16*; 7:00 pm		Youngstown State	W 67–50	6–3	RBC Center (9,071); Raleigh, NC
Dec 19*; 4:45 pm, FSN		Arizona	L 62–72	6–4	RBC Center (16,119); Raleigh, NC
Dec 22*; 7:00 pm		Delaware State	W 72–70	7–4	RBC Center (11,435); Raleigh, NC
Dec 28*; 7:00 pm		Alabama A&M	W 82–51	8–4	RBC Center (9,519); Raleigh, NC
Jan 1*; 12:00 pm, FSN		San Diego	W 76–54	9–4	RBC Center (11,384); Raleigh, NC
Jan 5*; 7:00 pm		vs. Elon	W 87–72	10–4	Greensboro Coliseum (3,705); Greensboro, NC
Jan 8; 2:30 pm, ACC Network		Wake Forest	W 90–69	11–4 (1–0)	RBC Center (16,591); Raleigh, NC
Jan 11; 9:00 pm, ESPNU		at Boston College	L 66–75	11–5 (1–1)	Conte Forum (3,652); Chestnut Hill, MA
Jan 15; 4:00 pm, ACC Network		at Florida State	L 71–84	11–6 (1–2)	Donald L. Tucker Center (10,517); Tallahassee, FL
Jan 19; 7:00 pm, ESPN		No. 4 Duke	L 78–92	11–7 (1–3)	RBC Center (19,387); Raleigh, NC
Jan 23; 12:00 pm, ACC Network		Miami (FL)	W 72–70	12–7 (2–3)	RBC Center (15,222); Raleigh, NC
Jan 25; 7:00 pm, FSN		at Clemson	L 50–60	12–8 (2–4)	Littlejohn Coliseum (9,000); Clemson, SC
Jan 29; 2:00 pm, ESPN		at North Carolina; Carolina–State Game	L 64–84	12–9 (2–5)	Dean Smith Center (21,750); Chapel Hill, NC
Feb 2; 7:00 pm, ESPN/ESPN2		Virginia Tech	L 69–77	12–10 (2–6)	RBC Center (15,945); Raleigh, NC
Feb 5; 6:00 pm, ESPN/ESPN2		at No. 5 Duke	L 52–76	12–11 (2–7)	Cameron Indoor Stadium (9,314); Durham, NC
Feb 13; 1:00 pm, ACC Network		at Wake Forest	W 80–55	13–11 (3–7)	LJVM Coliseum (12,576); Winston-Salem, NC
Feb 17; 7:00 pm, ESPN/ESPN2		Clemson	W 69–61	14–11 (4–7)	RBC Center (14,891); Raleigh, NC
Feb 20; 5:30 pm, FSN		at Maryland	L 80–87	14–12 (4–8)	Comcast Center (17,950); College Park, MD
Feb 23; 2:00 pm, ACC Network		No. 19 North Carolina; Carolina–State Game	L 63–75	14–13 (4–9)	RBC Center (19,700); Raleigh, NC
Feb 26; 2:00 pm, ACC Network		Georgia Tech	W 79–74	15–13 (5–9)	RBC Center (16,020); Raleigh, NC
Mar 1; 7:00 pm, FSN		at Virginia	L 58–69	15–14 (5–10)	John Paul Jones Arena (8,930); Charlottesville, VA
Mar 6; 6:15 pm, FSN		Florida State	L 62–72	15–15 (5–11)	RBC Center (14,218); Raleigh, NC
ACC tournament
Mar 10; 7:00 pm, Raycom/ESPN2	(10)	vs. (7) Maryland; ACC First Round	L 67–75	15–16	Greensboro Coliseum (23,381); Greensboro, NC
*Non-conference game. ^{#}Rankings from AP poll. (#) Tournament seedings in parentheses. All times are in Eastern Time.
