= 2011–12 Georgia Tech Yellow Jackets men's basketball team =

American college basketball season

2011–12 Georgia Tech Yellow Jackets men's basketball
- Conference: Atlantic Coast Conference
- Record: 11–20 (4–12 ACC)
- Head coach: Brian Gregory (1st season)
- Assistant coaches: Chad Dollar; Josh Postorino; Billy Schmidt
- Home arena: Philips Arena; Arena at Gwinnett Center

2011–12 ACC men's basketball standings
	Conf.				Overall
Team	W		L	PCT	W		L	PCT
No. 6 North Carolina	14	–	2	.875	32	–	6	.842
No. 14 Duke	13	–	3	.813	27	–	7	.794
No. 15 Florida State†	12	–	4	.750	25	–	10	.714
Virginia	9	–	7	.563	22	–	10	.688
No. 20 NC State	9	–	7	.563	24	–	13	.649
Miami (FL)	9	–	7	.563	20	–	13	.606
Clemson	8	–	8	.500	16	–	15	.516
Maryland	6	–	10	.375	17	–	15	.531
Virginia Tech	4	–	12	.250	16	–	17	.485
Wake Forest	4	–	12	.250	13	–	18	.419
Georgia Tech	4	–	12	.250	11	–	20	.355
Boston College	4	–	12	.250	9	–	22	.290
† 2012 ACC tournament winner As of April 3, 2012; Rankings from Coaches Poll

The 2011–12 Georgia Tech Yellow Jackets men's basketball team represented the Georgia Institute of Technology during the 2011–12 NCAA Division I men's basketball season. The Yellow Jackets, led by first-year head coach Brian Gregory, are members of the Atlantic Coast Conference. Due to renovations at their regular home arena, the Alexander Memorial Coliseum, the Yellow Jackets played their home games at Philips Arena and the Arena at Gwinnett Center. They finished the season 11–20, 4–12 in ACC play to finish in a tie for last place. They lost in the first round of the ACC Basketball tournament to Miami.

== Roster ==
Number	Name	Position	Height	Weight	Year	Hometown
0	Mfon Udofia	Guard	6–2	193	Junior	Stone Mountain, Georgia
1	Julian Royal	Forward	6–7	230	Freshman	Alpharetta, Georgia
2	Pierre Jordan	Guard	6–0	170	Senior	Dunwoody, Georgia
4	Nick Foreman	Guard	6–3	210	Senior	Bellaire, Texas
5	Daniel Miller	Center	6–11	258	Sophomore	Loganville, Georgia
11	Aaron Peek	Guard/Forward	6–4	190	Freshman	Atlanta, Georgia
13	McPherson Moore	Guard	6–3	200	Sophomore	St. Louis, Missouri
14	Jason Morris	Guard	6–5	210	Sophomore	Augusta, Georgia
23	Brandon Reed	Guard	6–3	180	Sophomore	Powder Springs, Georgia
24	Kammeon Holsey	Forward	6–8	226	Sophomore	Sparta, Georgia
33	Derek Craig	Guard	6–4	205	Senior	Spring, Texas
41	Glen Rice Jr.	Guard	6–5	206	Junior	Marietta, Georgia
42	Nate Hicks	Center	6–10	218	Sophomore	Panama City Beach, Florida

== Schedule ==
Date time, TV	Rank^{#}	Opponent^{#}	Result	Record	Site (attendance) city, state
Regular season
11/11/2011*; 8:00 pm, ESPN3		Florida A&M	W 92–59	1–0	Arena at Gwinnett Center (2,590); Duluth, GA
11/14/2011*; 7:00 pm, ESPN3		Delaware State	W 70–52	2–0	Arena at Gwinnett Center (1,079); Duluth, GA
11/17/2011*; 8:00 pm, CSS		vs. Saint Joseph's; Charleston Classic first round	L 53–66	2–1	TD Arena (2,941); Charleston, SC
11/18/2011*; 8:30 pm, CSS		vs. VCU; Charleston Classic loser bracket	W 73–60	3–1	TD Arena (4,528); Charleston, SC
11/20/2011*; 2:30 pm, CSS/ESPN3		vs. LSU; Charleston Classic fifth place game	L 50–59	3–2	TD Arena (2,112); Charleston, SC
11/23/2011*; 7:00 pm, ESPNU		Siena	W 72–44	4–2	Arena at Gwinnett Center (3,047); Duluth, GA
11/29/2011*; 7:15 pm, ESPNU		Northwestern; ACC – Big Ten Challenge	L 60–76	4–3	Philips Arena (5,619); Atlanta, GA
12/03/2011*; 2:00 pm, CBSSN		at Tulane	L 52–57	4–4	Fogelman Arena (3,170); New Orleans, LA
12/07/2011*; 7:00 pm, FSSO		at Georgia	W 68–56	5–4	Stegeman Coliseum (7,620); Athens, GA
12/10/2011*; 6:00 pm		at Savannah State	W 65–45	6–4	Tiger Arena (3,521); Savannah, GA
12/19/2011*; 7:00 pm, ESPN3		Alabama A&M	W 65–54	7–4	Arena at Gwinnett Center (2,467); Duluth, GA
12/22/2011*; 7:00 pm, ESPN3		Mercer	L 59–64	7–5	Arena at Gwinnett Center (3,841); Duluth, GA
12/29/2011*; 8:00 pm, CBSSN		at Fordham	L 66–72	7–6	Rose Hill Gymnasium (3,200); Bronx, New York
01/03/2012*; 9:00 pm, ESPNU		Alabama	L 48–73	7–7	Philips Arena (5,738); Atlanta, GA
01/07/2012; 12:00 pm, ESPNU		No. 5 Duke	L 74–81	7–8 (0–1)	Philips Arena (9,277); Atlanta, GA
01/11/2012; 9:00 pm, RSN		at NC State	W 82–71	8–8 (1–1)	RBC Center (14,072); Raleigh, NC
01/15/2012; 4:00 pm, ACC Network		at Maryland	L 50–61	8–9 (1–2)	Comcast Center (11,776); Raleigh, NC
01/19/2012; 8:00 pm, ACC Network		No. 15 Virginia	L 38–70	8–10 (1–3)	Philips Arena (5,885); Atlanta, GA
01/21/2012; 2:30 pm, ACC Network		at Clemson	L 62–64	8–11 (1–4)	Littlejohn Coliseum (9,135); Clemson, SC
01/24/2012; 9:00 pm, ESPNU		Miami (FL)	L 49–64	8–12 (1–5)	Philips Arena (5,009); Atlanta, GA
01/29/2012; 6:00 pm, ESPNU		at No. 7 North Carolina	L 81–93	8–13 (1–6)	Dean E. Smith Center (21,017); Chapel Hill, NC
02/01/2012; 7:00 pm, RSN		at No. 21 Florida State	L 54–68	8–14 (1–7)	Donald L. Tucker Center (9,756); Tallahassee, FL
02/04/2012; 1:00 pm, ESPNU		Boston College	W 51–47	9–14 (2–7)	Philips Arena (5,871); Atlanta, GA
02/09/2012; 7:00 pm, ESPNU		NC State	L 52–61	9–15 (2–8)	Philips Arena (5,439); Atlanta, GA
02/15/2012; 7:30 pm, RSN		at Wake Forest	L 50–59	9–16 (2–9)	LJVM Coliseum (7,634); Winston-Salem, NC
02/18/2012; 3:00 pm, RSN		at Virginia Tech	L 73–74 ^{OT}	9–17 (2–10)	Cassell Coliseum (9,847); Blacksburg, VA
02/21/2012; 7:00 pm, RSN		Clemson	L 37–56	9–18 (2–11)	Philips Arena (5,412); Atlanta, GA
02/25/2012; 2:30 pm, ACC Network		Maryland	W 63–61	10–18 (3–11)	Philips Arena (6,502); Atlanta, GA
02/29/2012; 7:00 pm, RSN		at Boston College	W 56–52	10–19 (3–12)	Conte Forum (4,474); Chestnut Hill, MA
03/03/2012; 12:00 pm, ACC Network		Wake Forest	W 69–62	11–19 (4–12)	Philips Arena (6,157); Atlanta, GA
ACC men's basketball tournament
03/08/2012; 9:00 pm, ESPNU/ACC Network		vs. Miami (FL); First Round	L 36–54	11–20	Philips Arena (19,520); Atlanta, GA
*Non-conference game. ^{#}Rankings from AP Poll. (#) Tournament seedings in parentheses. All times are in Eastern Time.
