= 2011–12 NC State Wolfpack men's basketball team =

American college basketball season

2011–12 NC State Wolfpack men's basketball

NCAA Tournament, Sweet Sixteen
- Conference: Atlantic Coast Conference

Ranking
- Coaches: No. 20
- Record: 24–13 (9–7 ACC)
- Head coach: Mark Gottfried
- Assistant coaches: Orlando Early; Bobby Lutz; Rob Moxley
- Home arena: PNC Arena

2011–12 ACC men's basketball standings
	Conf.				Overall
Team	W		L	PCT	W		L	PCT
No. 6 North Carolina	14	–	2	.875	32	–	6	.842
No. 14 Duke	13	–	3	.813	27	–	7	.794
No. 15 Florida State†	12	–	4	.750	25	–	10	.714
Virginia	9	–	7	.563	22	–	10	.688
No. 20 NC State	9	–	7	.563	24	–	13	.649
Miami (FL)	9	–	7	.563	20	–	13	.606
Clemson	8	–	8	.500	16	–	15	.516
Maryland	6	–	10	.375	17	–	15	.531
Virginia Tech	4	–	12	.250	16	–	17	.485
Wake Forest	4	–	12	.250	13	–	18	.419
Georgia Tech	4	–	12	.250	11	–	20	.355
Boston College	4	–	12	.250	9	–	22	.290
† 2012 ACC tournament winner As of April 3, 2012; Rankings from Coaches Poll

The 2011–12 NC State Wolfpack men's basketball team represented NC State University in the 2011–12 men's college basketball season. The team was led by Mark Gottfried and played its home games at the RBC Center in Raleigh, NC as members of the Atlantic Coast Conference. They finished the season 24-13 overall, 9-7 in ACC play, finishing in a three-way tie for fourth place. As a No. 5 seed in the 2012 ACC men's basketball tournament, they defeated Boston College in the first round and Virginia in the quarterfinals before falling to North Carolina in the semi-finals. They received an at large bid to the 2012 NCAA Division I men's basketball tournament, where they beat San Diego State in the second round and Georgetown in the third round before falling to Kansas in the Sweet Sixteen.

== Class of 2011 Commits ==
College recruiting information
Name	Hometown	School	Height	Weight	Commit date
Tyler Harris; PF	Dix Hills, New York	St. Benedict's Prep (NJ)	6 ft 7.5 in (2.02 m)	186 lb (84 kg)	Nov 3, 2010
Tyler Harris; PF	Recruit ratings: Scout: Rivals: (92)				
Jaqawn Raymond; SG	Statesboro, Georgia	Statesboro High School (GA)	6 ft 3 in (1.91 m)	195 lb (88 kg)	Mar 6, 2011
Jaqawn Raymond; SG	Recruit ratings: Scout: Rivals: (87)				
Thomas De Thaey; PF	Dendermonde, Belgium	Canarias Basketball Academy (CI)	6 ft 8 in (2.03 m)	235 lb (107 kg)	May 18, 2011
Thomas De Thaey; PF	Recruit ratings: Scout: Rivals: (40)				
Overall recruit ranking: Scout: N/A Rivals: N/A ESPN: N/A
Note: In many cases, Scout, Rivals, 247Sports, On3, and ESPN may conflict in their listings of height and weight.; In these cases, the average was taken. ESPN grades are on a 100-point scale.; Sources: "N.C. State Basketball Commitment List". Rivals.; "North Carolina State College Basketball Recruiting Commits". Scout.; "2011 Player Commits". ESPN.; "Scout.com Team Recruiting Rankings". Scout.; "2011 Team Ranking". Rivals.

== Roster ==
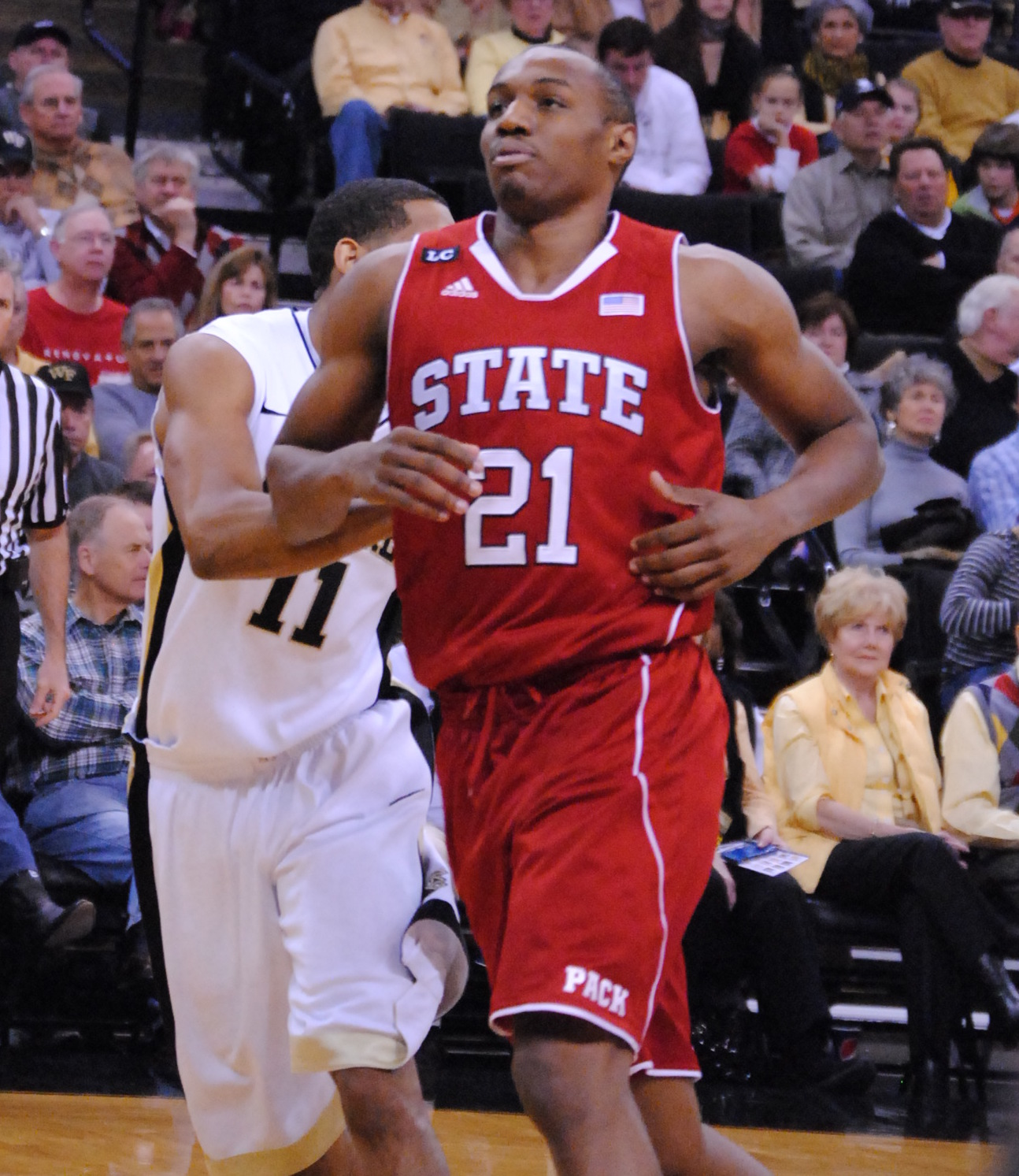
C.J. Williams

Note: Flags indicate national team eligibility at FIBA sanctioned events. Players may hold other non-FIBA nationality not displayed.

No.		Position	Player
0	(United States)	C	DeShawn Painter
1	(United States)	F	Richard Howell
2	(United States)	G	Lorenzo Brown
3	(Canada)	G	Alex Johnson
5	(United States)	F	C. J. Leslie
10	(United States)	G	Jaqawn Raymond
13	(Belgium)	F	Thomas de Thaey
14	(Australia)	C	Jordan Vandenberg
15	(United States)	F	Scott Wood
20	(United States)	G	Jay Lewis
21	(United States)	G	C. J. Williams
22	(United States)	G	Ben Amos
25	(United States)	F	Kendall Smith
30	(United States)	G	Staats Battle
34	(United States)	F	Tyler Harris

== Schedule and results ==
Date time, TV	Rank^{#}	Opponent^{#}	Result	Record	Site (attendance) city, state
Exhibition
November 7, 2011*; 7:00pm		Flagler	W 102–61		RBC Center (N/A); Raleigh, NC
Regular Season
November 11, 2011*; 7:00pm		UNC Asheville	W 84–75	1–0	RBC Center (12,441); Raleigh, NC
November 13, 2011*; 6:00pm, ESPN3		Morehead State	W 91–61	2–0	RBC Center (10,082); Raleigh, NC
November 16th, 2011*; 7:00pm, ESPNU		Princeton	W 60–58	3–0	RBC Center (12,140); Raleigh, NC
November 19, 2011*; 6:30pm, ESPN3		vs. No. 18 Vanderbilt; Legends Classic	L 79–86	3–1	Izod Center (N/A); East Rutherford, NJ
November 21, 2011*; 6:30pm, ESPN3		vs. Texas; Legends Classic	W 77–74	4–1	Izod Center (N/A); East Rutherford, NJ
November 25, 2011*; 7:00pm, ESPN3		Elon	W 82–67	5–1	Reynolds Coliseum (7,315); Raleigh, NC
November 30, 2011*; 7:15pm, ESPN2		Indiana; ACC-Big Ten Challenge	L 75–86	5–2	RBC Center (16,597); Raleigh, NC
December 4, 2011*; 4:00pm, FSN		at Stanford	L 72–76	5–3	Maples Pavilion (5,871); Stanford, CA
December 11, 2011*; 3:00pm, ESPN3		NC Central	W 65–60	6–3	Reynolds Coliseum (4,018); Raleigh, NC
December 17, 2011*; 6:30pm, ESPN2		No. 1 Syracuse	L 72–88	6–4	RBC Center (19,400); Raleigh, NC
December 20, 2011*; 7:00pm		vs. St. Bonaventure; Fibertech Classic	W 67–65	7–4	Blue Cross Arena (5,802); Rochester, NY
December 22, 2011*; 7:00pm, ESPN3		Northeastern	W 88–59	8–4	RBC Center (11,652); Raleigh, NC
December 29, 2011*; 7:00pm, ESPN3		Campbell	W 87–81	9–4	Reynolds Coliseum (7,734); Raleigh, NC
December 31, 2011*; 2:00pm, ESPN3		Western Carolina	W 82–55	10–4	RBC Center (13,429); Raleigh, NC
January 4, 2012*; 7:00pm		Delaware State	W 78–44	11–4	RBC Center (10,159); Raleigh, NC
ACC Regular Season
January 8, 2012; 6:00pm, ESPNU		Maryland	W 79–74	12–4 (1–0)	RBC Center (18,057); Raleigh, NC
January 11, 2012; 9:00pm, RSN		Georgia Tech	L 71–82	12–5 (1–1)	RBC Center (14,072); Raleigh, NC
January 14, 2012; 1:00pm, RSN		at Wake Forest	W 76–40	13–5 (2–1)	LJVM Coliseum (11,101); Winston-Salem, NC
January 19, 2012; 8:00pm, ACC Network		Boston College	W 76–62	14–5 (3–1)	RBC Center (16,051); Raleigh, NC
January 22, 2012; 12:00pm, ACC Network		at Miami (FL)	W 78–73	15–5 (4–1)	BankUnited Center (4,371); Coral Gables, FL
January 26, 2012; 7:00pm, ESPN		at No. 7 North Carolina; Carolina-State Rivalry	L 55–74	15–6 (4–2)	Smith Center (21,750); Chapel Hill, NC
January 28, 2012; 8:00pm, ESPN2		No. 19 Virginia	L 60–61	15–7 (4–3)	RBC Center (17,027); Raleigh, NC
February 1, 2012; 8:00pm, RSN		at Boston College	W 56–51	16–7 (5–3)	Conte Forum (3,611); Chestnut Hill, MA
February 4, 2012; 1:00pm, ACC Network		Wake Forest	W 87–76	17–7 (6–3)	RBC Center (15,525); Raleigh, NC
February 9, 2012; 7:00pm, ESPNU		at Georgia Tech	W 61–52	18–7 (7–3)	Philips Arena (5,439); Atlanta, GA
February 16, 2012; 9:00pm, ACC Network		at No. 5 Duke	L 73–78	18–8 (7–4)	Cameron Indoor Stadium (9,314); Durham, NC
February 18, 2012; 1:00pm, ACC Network		No. 20 Florida State	L 62–76	18–9 (7–5)	RBC Center (17,547); Raleigh, NC
February 21, 2012; 8:00pm, ACC Network		No. 7 North Carolina	L 74–86	18–10 (7–6)	RBC Center (19,710); Raleigh, NC
February 25, 2012; 2:30pm, ACC Network		at Clemson	L 69–72	18–11 (7–7)	Littlejohn Coliseum (10,000); Clemson, SC
February 29, 2012; 9:00pm, RSN		Miami (FL)	W 77–73	19–11 (8–7)	RBC Center (14,682); Raleigh, NC
March 4, 2012; 6:00pm, ESPNU		at Virginia Tech	W 70–58	20–11 (9–7)	Cassell Coliseum (9,847); Blacksburg, VA
2012 ACC men's basketball tournament
March 8, 2012; 2:00pm, ESPNU/ACC Network		vs. Boston College; First Round	W 78–57	21–11	Philips Arena (19,520); Atlanta, GA
March 9, 2012; 2:35pm, ESPN2/ACC Network		vs. Virginia; Quarterfinals	W 67–64	22–11	Philips Arena (19,520); Atlanta, GA
March 10, 2012; 1:00pm, ESPN/ACC Network		vs. No. 4 North Carolina; Semifinals	L 67–69	22–12	Philips Arena (19,520); Atlanta, GA
2012 NCAA Division I men's basketball tournament
March 16, 2012*; 12:40pm, truTV	No. (MW 11)	vs. No. 22 (MW 6) San Diego State; Second Round	W 79–65	23–12	Nationwide Arena (17,030); Columbus, OH
March 18, 2012*; 12:15pm, CBS	No. (MW 11)	vs. No. 15 (MW 3) Georgetown; Third Round	W 66–63	24–12	Nationwide Arena (17,425); Columbus, Ohio
March 23, 2012*; 10:17pm, TBS	No. (MW 11)	vs. No. 6 (MW 2) Kansas; Sweet Sixteen	L 57–60	24–13	Edward Jones Dome (23,964); St. Louis, MO
*Non-conference game. ^{#}Rankings from AP Poll. (#) Tournament seedings in parentheses. All times are in Eastern Time. (#) during NCAA Tournament is seed with Region.
