= 2011–12 Boston College Eagles men's basketball team =

American college basketball season

2011–12 Boston College Eagles men's basketball
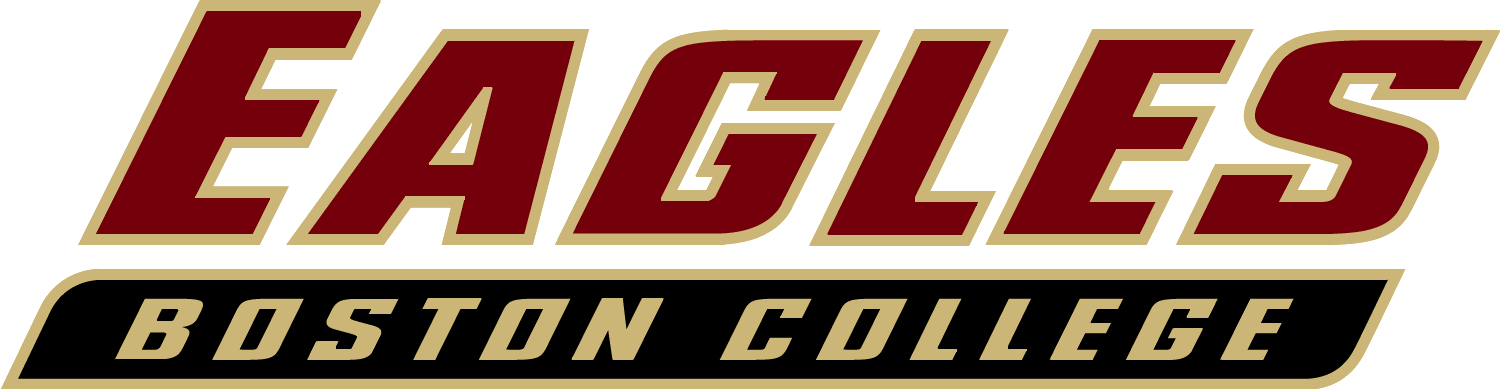
- Conference: Atlantic Coast Conference
- Record: 9–22 (4–12 ACC)
- Head coach: Steve Donahue
- Assistant coaches: Nat Graham; Woody Kampmann; Akbar Waheed
- Home arena: Conte Forum

2011–12 ACC men's basketball standings
	Conf.				Overall
Team	W		L	PCT	W		L	PCT
No. 6 North Carolina	14	–	2	.875	32	–	6	.842
No. 14 Duke	13	–	3	.813	27	–	7	.794
No. 15 Florida State†	12	–	4	.750	25	–	10	.714
Virginia	9	–	7	.563	22	–	10	.688
No. 20 NC State	9	–	7	.563	24	–	13	.649
Miami (FL)	9	–	7	.563	20	–	13	.606
Clemson	8	–	8	.500	16	–	15	.516
Maryland	6	–	10	.375	17	–	15	.531
Virginia Tech	4	–	12	.250	16	–	17	.485
Wake Forest	4	–	12	.250	13	–	18	.419
Georgia Tech	4	–	12	.250	11	–	20	.355
Boston College	4	–	12	.250	9	–	22	.290
† 2012 ACC tournament winner As of April 3, 2012; Rankings from Coaches Poll

The 2011–12 Boston College Eagles men's basketball team represented Boston College in the 2011–12 NCAA Division I men's basketball season. The Eagles were led by second-year head coach Steve Donahue. The team played its home games at Conte Forum on the campus of Boston College in Chestnut Hill, Massachusetts. Boston College competed in the Atlantic Coast Conference.

The Eagles lost to NC State in the first round of the ACC tournament.

== Recruiting ==
College recruiting information
Name	Hometown	School	Height	Weight	Commit date
Ryan Anderson; F	Lakewood, CA	Long Beach Polytechnic	6 ft 8 in (2.03 m)	215 lb (98 kg)	Sep 20, 2010
Ryan Anderson; F	Recruit ratings: Scout: Rivals: (92)				
Kyle Caudill; C	Brea, CA	Brea Olinda	6 ft 11 in (2.11 m)	265 lb (120 kg)	Aug 9, 2010
Kyle Caudill; C	Recruit ratings: Scout: Rivals: (89)				
Jordan Daniels; G	Fontana, CA	Etiwanda	5 ft 8 in (1.73 m)	150 lb (68 kg)	Feb 18, 2011
Jordan Daniels; G	Recruit ratings: Scout: Rivals: (89)				
Lonnie Jackson; G	Valencia, CA	Valencia	6 ft 3 in (1.91 m)	165 lb (75 kg)	Sep 20, 2010
Lonnie Jackson; G	Recruit ratings: Scout: Rivals: (88)				
Dennis Clifford; C	Milton, MA	Milton Academy	7 ft 0 in (2.13 m)	215 lb (98 kg)	May 24, 2010
Dennis Clifford; C	Recruit ratings: Scout: Rivals: (87)				
Eddie Odio; F	Miami, FL	Christopher Columbus	6 ft 6 in (1.98 m)	205 lb (93 kg)	May 20, 2010
Eddie Odio; F	Recruit ratings: Scout: Rivals: (80)				
Patrick Heckmann; F	Mainz, Germany	Theresianum Gymnasium	6 ft 6 in (1.98 m)	195 lb (88 kg)	May 26, 2011
Patrick Heckmann; F	Recruit ratings: Scout: Rivals: (40)				
Overall recruit ranking:
Note: In many cases, Scout, Rivals, 247Sports, On3, and ESPN may conflict in their listings of height and weight.; In these cases, the average was taken. ESPN grades are on a 100-point scale.; Sources: "2011 Team Ranking". Rivals.

== Roster ==
Name	Number	Position	Height	Weight	Year	Hometown
Salah Abdo	0	G	6–2	188	Sr.	Chelsea, Massachusetts
Gabe Moton	1	G	6–1	177	So.	St. Petersburg, Florida
Deirunas Visockas	2	G	6–4	192	Sr.	Kaunas, Lithuania
Eddie Odio	4	F	6–7	195	Fr.	Miami, Florida
K. C. Caudill	5	C	6–10	279	Fr.	Brea, California
Jordan Daniels	10	G	5–8	153	Fr.	Fontana, California
Ryan Kilcullen	11	F	6–7	214	Fr.	Hingham, Massachusetts
Ryan Anderson	12	F	6–8	217	Fr.	Lakewood, California
John Cain Carney	13	F	6–7	218	Fr.	Philadelphia, Pennsylvania
Matt Humphrey	15	G	6–5	185	RS Jr.	Chicago, Illinois
Lonnie Jackson	20	G	6–3	170	Fr.	Valencia, California
Dennis Clifford	24	C	7–0	241	Fr.	Bridgewater, Massachusetts
Peter Rehnquist	25	G-F	6–4	210	Sr.	Sharon, Massachusetts
Dallas Elmore	30	G	6–5	210	Jr.	Fort Collins, Colorado
Danny Rubin	31	G	6–6	170	So.	Chevy Chase, Maryland
Patrick Heckmann	33	G	6–5	196	Fr.	Mainz, Germany

== Schedule and results ==
The ACC had games on multiple media broadcasts on the ESPN family of networks, including ESPN3 exclusives for non-conference games, on the ACC Regional Sports Network (also called RSN-, found on FSN affiliates for most of the country), and with Raycom Sports ACC Network. For Boston College games done by RSN, would air on NESN. Games that aired on the ACC Network would air on TV–38 WSBK-TV.

Date time, TV	Rank^{#}	Opponent^{#}	Result	Record	Site (attendance) city, state
Exhibition
11/05/2011*; 1:00 pm		American International	W 70–66		Conte Forum (864); Chestnut Hill, MA
Regular season
11/14/2011*; 7:00 pm		New Hampshire	W 67–64	1–0	Conte Forum (3,588); Chestnut Hill, MA
11/18/2011*; 7:30 pm		at Holy Cross	L 64–86	1–1	Hart Center (3,071); Worcester, MA
11/21/2011*; 7:00 pm, ESPN3		Massachusetts	L 46–82	1–2	Conte Forum (4,162); Chestnut Hill, MA
11/24/2011*; 2:00 pm, ESPNU		vs. Saint Louis; 76 Classic first round	L 51–62	1–3	Anaheim Convention Center (N/A); Anaheim, CA
11/25/2011*; 5:00 pm, ESPNU		vs. UC Riverside; 76 Classic loser bracket	W 66–62 ^{OT}	2–3	Anaheim Convention Center (2,087); Anaheim, CA
11/27/2011*; 3:30 pm, ESPNU		vs. New Mexico; 76 Classic 5th-place game	L 57–75	2–4	Anaheim Convention Center (N/A); Anaheim, CA
11/30/2011*; 7:15 pm, ESPNU		Penn State; ACC-Big Ten Challenge	L 54–62	2–5	Conte Forum (4,326); Chestnut Hill, MA
12/03/2011*; 2:00 pm, ESPN3		Boston University	L 61–75	2–6	Conte Forum (4,976); Chestnut Hill, MA
12/08/2011*; 7:00 pm, ESPN3		at Providence	L 57–64	2–7	Dunkin Donuts Center (8,057); Providence, RI
12/11/2011*; 5:00 pm, RSN		Stony Brook	W 66–51	3–7	Conte Forum (3,426); Chestnut Hill, MA
12/18/2011*; 1:00 pm, RSN		Bryant	W 75–55	4–7	Conte Forum (3,563); Chestnut Hill, MA
12/21/2011*; 7:00 pm		Sacred Heart	W 83–73	5–7	Conte Forum (2,263); Chestnut Hill, MA
12/29/2010*; 7:00 pm, ESPN3		No. 24 Harvard	L 46–67	5–8	Conte Forum (8,606); Chestnut Hill, MA
01/02/2012*; 1:30 pm, ESPN3		Rhode Island	L 72–78 ^{2OT}	5–9	Conte Forum (4,583); Chestnut Hill, MA
01/07/2012; 2:30 pm, ACC Network		at No. 3 North Carolina	L 60–83	5–10 (0–1)	Dean E. Smith Center (20,582); Chapel Hill, NC
01/12/2012; 7:00 pm, ESPN2		Clemson	W 59–57	6–10 (1–1)	Conte Forum (3,829); Chestnut Hill, MA
01/14/2012; 3:00 pm, RSN		Virginia Tech	W 61–59	7–10 (2–1)	Conte Forum (5,038); Chestnut Hill, MA
01/19/2012; 8:00 pm, ACC Network		at NC State	L 62–76	7–11 (2–2)	RBC Center (16,051); Raleigh, NC
01/21/2012; 12:00 pm, ACC Network		Wake Forest	L 56–71	7–12 (2–3)	Conte Forum (4,986); Chestnut Hill, MA
01/26/2012; 9:00 pm, ESPNU		at No. 19 Virginia	L 49–66	7–13 (2–4)	John Paul Jones Arena (9,827); Charlottesville, VA
01/29/2012; 1:00 pm, ACC Network		Miami (FL)	L 54–76	7–14 (2–5)	Conte Forum (5,874); Chestnut Hill, NC
02/01/2012; 8:00 pm, ACC Network		NC State	L 51–56	7–15 (2–6)	Conte Forum (3,611); Chestnut Hill, MA
02/04/2012; 1:00 pm, ESPNU		at Georgia Tech	L 47–51	7–16 (2–7)	Philips Arena (5,871); Atlanta, GA
02/08/2012; 7:00 pm, ESPN3		No. 15 Florida State	W 64–60	8–16 (3–7)	Conte Forum (4,074); Chestnut Hill, MA
02/12/2012; 6:00 pm, ESPNU		at Virginia Tech	L 65–66	8–17 (3–8)	Cassell Coliseum (9,171); Blacksburg, VA
02/16/2012; 9:00 pm, ACC Network		at Maryland	L 65–81	8–18 (3–9)	Comcast Center (12,465); College Park, MD
02/19/2012; 6:00 pm, ESPNU		No. 5 Duke	L 50–75	8–19 (3–10)	Conte Forum (8,606); Chestnut Hill, MA
02/25/2012; 1:00 pm, RSN		at Wake Forest	L 56–85	8–20 (3–11)	LJVM Coliseum (9,742); Winston-Salem, NC
02/29/2012; 7:00 pm, RSN		Georgia Tech	W 56–52	9–20 (4–11)	Conte Forum (4,474); Chestnut Hill, MA
03/03/2012; 2:30 pm, ACC Network		at Miami (FL)	L 56–77	9–21 (4–12)	BankUnited Center (3,834); Coral Gables, FL
2012 ACC tournament
03/08/2012; 2:00 pm, ESPNU/ACC Network		vs. NC State; First round	L 57–78	9–22	Philips Arena (19,520); Atlanta, GA
*Non-conference game. ^{#}Rankings from AP Poll. (#) Tournament seedings in parentheses. All times are in Eastern Time..
