= 2011–12 Maryland Terrapins men's basketball team =

American college basketball season

2011–12 Maryland Terrapins men's basketball
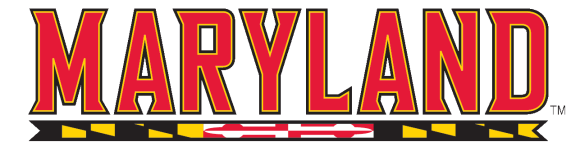
- Conference: Atlantic Coast Conference
- Record: 17–15 (6–10 ACC)
- Head coach: Mark Turgeon (1st season)
- Assistant coaches: Dalonte Hill; Bino Ranson; Scott Spinelli
- Home arena: Comcast Center

2011–12 ACC men's basketball standings
	Conf.				Overall
Team	W		L	PCT	W		L	PCT
No. 6 North Carolina	14	–	2	.875	32	–	6	.842
No. 14 Duke	13	–	3	.813	27	–	7	.794
No. 15 Florida State†	12	–	4	.750	25	–	10	.714
Virginia	9	–	7	.563	22	–	10	.688
No. 20 NC State	9	–	7	.563	24	–	13	.649
Miami (FL)	9	–	7	.563	20	–	13	.606
Clemson	8	–	8	.500	16	–	15	.516
Maryland	6	–	10	.375	17	–	15	.531
Virginia Tech	4	–	12	.250	16	–	17	.485
Wake Forest	4	–	12	.250	13	–	18	.419
Georgia Tech	4	–	12	.250	11	–	20	.355
Boston College	4	–	12	.250	9	–	22	.290
† 2012 ACC tournament winner As of April 3, 2012; Rankings from Coaches Poll

The 2011–12 Maryland Terrapins men's basketball team represented the University of Maryland in the 2011–12 college basketball season as a member of the Atlantic Coast Conference (ACC). The team was led by first-year head coach Mark Turgeon, previously head coach of the Texas A&M Aggies. In March 2011, Turgeon was hired to replace Gary Williams, who retired from the position after 22 years at his alma mater. The Terrapins played their home games on campus at the Comcast Center in College Park, Maryland.

Hometowns of team roster

== Preseason ==
=== Recruiting ===
College recruiting
Name	Hometown	School	Height	Weight	Commit date
Nick Faust; SG	Baltimore, Maryland	Baltimore City College	6 ft 5 in (1.96 m)	175 lb (79 kg)	Oct 28, 2010
Nick Faust; SG	Recruit ratings: Scout: Rivals: (96)				
Overall recruit ranking: Scout: NR Rivals: NR ESPN: NR
Note: In many cases, Scout, Rivals, 247Sports, On3, and ESPN may conflict in their listings of height and weight.; In these cases, the average was taken. ESPN grades are on a 100-point scale.; Sources: "Maryland College Basketball Recruiting Commits". Scout.; "College Basketball Recruiting Schools". ESPN.; "Scout.com Team Recruiting Rankings". Scout.; "2011 Team Ranking". Rivals.

== Roster ==
2011–12 Maryland Terrapins men's basketball team
Players
Coaches

Pos.	#	Name	Height	Weight	Year	Hometown
G	5	Nick Faust	6 ft 6 in (1.98 m)	175 lb (79 kg)	Fr	Baltimore, Maryland
G	14	Sean Mosley	6 ft 4 in (1.93 m)	210 lb (95 kg)	Sr	Baltimore, Maryland
F	35	James Padgett	6 ft 8 in (2.03 m)	225 lb (102 kg)	Jr	Brooklyn, New York
G	21	Pe'Shon Howard	6 ft 3 in (1.91 m)	195 lb (88 kg)	So	Los Angeles, California
F	30	Ashton Pankey	6 ft 9 in (2.06 m)	220 lb (100 kg)	RS Fr	The Bronx, New York
G	11	Mychal Parker	6 ft 5 in (1.96 m)	195 lb (88 kg)	So	Washington, North Carolina
G	12	Terrell Stoglin	6 ft 1 in (1.85 m)	185 lb (84 kg)	So	Tucson, Arizona
C	10	Berend Weijs	6 ft 10 in (2.08 m)	200 lb (91 kg)	Sr	Amsterdam, Netherlands
G	4	Jacob Susskind	6 ft 5 in (1.96 m)	180 lb (82 kg)	Fr	West Orange, New Jersey
G	13	Arnold Richmond	5 ft 11 in (1.8 m)	175 lb (79 kg)	Fr	Suitland, Maryland
F	15	Spencer Barks	6 ft 9 in (2.06 m)	225 lb (102 kg)	Fr	Poolesville, Maryland
G	22	Jon Dillard	5 ft 11 in (1.8 m)	165 lb (75 kg)	Sr	Yorktown, Virginia
F	23	John Auslander	6 ft 7 in (2.01 m)	225 lb (102 kg)	So	Herndon, Virginia
G	24	Jonathan Thomas	6 ft 2 in (1.88 m)	190 lb (86 kg)	Jr	Frederick, Maryland
C	25	Alex Len	7 ft 1 in (2.16 m)	225 lb (102 kg)	Fr	Antratsit, Ukraine

Head coach

- Mark Turgeon (Kansas)

Assistant coach(es)

- Dalonte Hill (Bowie State)
- Bino Ranson (SNHU)
- Scott Spinelli (Boston University)

Legend

- (C) Team captain
- (S) Suspended
- (I) Ineligible
- (W) Walk-on
- Injured
- Current redshirt

Roster
Last update: 12/8/2011

== Schedule ==
Date time, TV	Rank^{#}	Opponent^{#}	Result	Record	High points	High rebounds	High assists	Site (attendance) city, state
Exhibition
November 4, 2011*; 8:00 pm		Northwood	W 89–84	–	23 – Stoglin	9 – Padgett	5 – Stoglin	Comcast Center (N/A); College Park, MD
Regular Season
November 13, 2011*; 8:00 pm, TerpsTV		UNC Wilmington	W 71–62	1–0	22 – Stoglin	8 – Pankey	2 – Faust, Padgett	Comcast Center (12,873); College Park, MD
November 17, 2011*; 5:00 pm, ESPN2		vs. No. 16 Alabama; Puerto Rico Tip-Off	L 42–62	1–1	9 – Padgett	10 – Pankey	3 – Faust, Stoglin	José Miguel Agrelot Coliseum (5,322); San Juan, Puerto Rico
November 18, 2011*; 6:30 pm, ESPN3		vs. Colorado; Puerto Rico Tip-Off	W 78–71	2–1	32 – Stoglin	7 – Mosley, Padgett	2 – Faust, Parker, Stoglin	José Miguel Agrelot Coliseum (N/A); San Juan, Puerto Rico
November 20, 2011*; 2:00 pm, ESPNU		vs. Iona; Puerto Rico Tip-Off	L 63–89	2–2	21 – Mosley	11 – Pankey	3 – Parker	José Miguel Agrelot Coliseum (11,297); San Juan, Puerto Rico
November 25, 2011*; 7:00 pm, ESPN3		Florida Gulf Coast	W 73–67	3–2	24 – Stoglin	7 – Mosley	4 – Faust	Comcast Center (12,080); College Park, MD
November 29, 2011*; 7:30 pm, ESPN		Illinois; ACC – Big Ten Challenge	L 62–71	3–3	25 – Stoglin	5 – Padgett, Parker	2 – Faust, Mosley	Comcast Center (13,187); College Park, MD
December 4, 2011*; 4:45 pm, MASN		vs. Notre Dame; BB&T Classic	W 78–71	4–3	31 – Stoglin	10 – Padgett	3 – Mosley	Verizon Center (N/A); Washington, DC
December 7, 2011*; 8:00 pm, ESPN3		Mount St. Mary's	W 77–74	5–3	23 – Stoglin	6 – Faust, Padgett	5 – Faust	Comcast Center (9,875); College Park, MD
December 14, 2011*; 7:00 pm, ESPN		Florida International	W 65–61	6–3	20 – Stoglin	7 – Padgett	3 – Stoglin	Comcast Center (11,679); College Park, MD
December 23, 2011*; 8:00 pm, ESPN3		Radford	W 65–60	7–3	17 – Pankey	9 – Padgett	4 – Faust	Comcast Center (9,979); College Park, MD
December 28, 2011*; 8:00 pm, TerpsTV		Albany	W 83–72	8–3	22 – Stoglin	8 – Len	8 – Howard	Comcast Center (11,751); College Park, MD
December 31, 2011*; 2:00 pm, Comcast SportsNet		Samford	W 75–63	9–3	24 – Stoglin	9 – Howard	5 – Howard	Comcast Center (11,429); College Park, MD
January 3, 2012*; 8:00 pm, ESPN3		Cornell	W 70–62	10–3	19 – Mosley	9 – Len	4 – Stoglin	Comcast Center (11,395); College Park, MD
January 8, 2012; 6:00 pm, ESPNU		at NC State	L 74–79	10–4 (0–1)	25 – Stoglin	11 – Len	8 – Howard	RBC Center (18,057); Raleigh, NC
January 11, 2012; 7:00 pm, RSN		Wake Forest	W 70–64	11–4 (1–1)	20 – Stoglin	9 – Pankey	3 – Howard	Comcast Center (13,357); College Park, MD
January 15, 2012; 4:00 pm, ACC Network		Georgia Tech	W 61–50	12–4 (2–1)	18 – Mosley	9 – Len, Padgett	2 – Mosley, Stoglin	Comcast Center (11,776); College Park, MD
January 17, 2012; 9:00 pm, ESPNU		at Florida State	L 70–84	12–5 (2–2)	27 – Stoglin	7 – Parker	4 – Howard, Stoglin	Donald L. Tucker Center (8,853); Tallahassee, FL
January 21, 2012*; 11:00 am, ESPNU		at Temple	L 60–73	12–6 (2–2)	20 – Stoglin	10 – Mosley	4 – Faust	The Palestra (8,722); Philadelphia, PA
January 25, 2012; 9:00 pm, ESPN		No. 8 Duke	L 61–74	12–7 (2–3)	16 – Stoglin	8 – Pankey	4 – Howard	Comcast Center (17,950); College Park, MD
January 28, 2012; 2:30 pm, ACC Network		Virginia Tech	W 73–69	13–7 (3–3)	28 – Stoglin	11 – Pankey	3 – Faust, Howard	Comcast Center (16,976); College Park, MD
February 1, 2012; 8:00 pm, ACC Network		at Miami (FL)	L 86–90 ^{2OT}	13–8 (3–4)	33 – Stoglin	9 – Mosley	8 – Howard	BankUnited Center (4,611); Coral Gables, FL
February 4, 2012; 4:00 pm, ESPN		No. 5 North Carolina	L 74–83	13–9 (3–5)	20 – Stoglin	9 – Len	4 – Stoglin	Comcast Center (17,950); College Park, MD
February 7, 2012; 7:00 pm, ESPNU		at Clemson	W 64–62	14–9 (4–5)	27 – Stoglin	9 – Pankey	4 – Mosley	Littlejohn Coliseum (7,321); Clemson, SC
February 11, 2012; 4:00 pm, ESPN		at No. 9 Duke	L 55–73	14–10 (4–6)	15 – Faust	8 – Faust	3 – Mosley	Cameron Indoor Stadium (9,314); Durham, NC
February 16, 2012; 9:00 pm, ACC Network		Boston College	W 81–65	15–10 (5–6)	24 – Stoglin	9 – Len	5 – Faust	Comcast Center (12,465); College Park, MD
February 18, 2012; 1:00 pm, ACC Network		at No. 22 Virginia	L 44–71	15–11 (5–7)	14 – Stoglin	8 – Pankey	1 – Mosley, Pankey, Parker	John Paul Jones Arena (14,101); Charlottesville, VA
February 21, 2012; 8:00 pm, ACC Network		Miami (FL)	W 75–70	16–11 (6–7)	20 – Stoglin	8 – Faust	6 – Mosley	Comcast Center (12,871); College Park, MD
February 25, 2012; 2:30 pm, ACC Network		at Georgia Tech	L 61–63	16–12 (6–8)	18 – Stoglin	8 – Len	2 – Faust	Philips Arena (6,502); Atlanta, GA
February 29, 2012; 7:00 pm, ESPN		at No. 6 North Carolina	L 64–88	16–13 (6–9)	17 – Faust	13 – Padgett	4 – Faust	Dean Smith Center (21,750); Chapel Hill, NC
March 4, 2012; 2:00 pm, ACC Network		No. 24 Virginia	L 72–75 ^{OT}	16–14 (6–10)	25 – Stoglin	10 – Mosley	4 – Mosley	Comcast Center (16,497); College Park, MD
ACC Tournament
March 8, 2012; 12:00 pm, ESPNU/ACC Network		vs. Wake Forest	W 82–60	17–14	25 – Stoglin	7 – Stoglin	4 – Mosley, Stoglin	Philips Arena (19,520); Atlanta, GA
March 9, 2012; 12:00 pm, ESPN2/ACC Network		vs. No. 4 North Carolina	L 69–85	17–15	30 – Stoglin	6 – Mosley	3 – Parker	Philips Arena (19,520); Atlanta, GA
*Non-conference game. ^{#}Rankings from AP Poll. (#) Tournament seedings in parentheses. All times are in Eastern Time.
