= 2012 ACC men's basketball tournament =

- 2012 ACC Tournament logo
- Classification: Division I
- Season: 2011–12
- Teams: 12
- Site: Philips Arena; Atlanta, Georgia
- Champions: Florida State (1st title)
- Winning coach: Leonard Hamilton (1st title)
- MVP: Michael Snaer (Florida State)
- Television: ESPN/ACC Network

The 2012 Atlantic Coast Conference men's basketball tournament, part of the 2011–12 NCAA Division I men's basketball season, took place from March 8 to 11 at the Philips Arena in Atlanta. The Florida State Seminoles gave the state of Florida its first-ever ACC tournament win, capturing their first ACC championship in their 21st season in the league.

== Seeding ==
2011–12 ACC men's basketball standings
	Conf.				Overall
Team	W		L	PCT	W		L	PCT
No. 6 North Carolina	14	–	2	.875	32	–	6	.842
No. 14 Duke	13	–	3	.813	27	–	7	.794
No. 15 Florida State†	12	–	4	.750	25	–	10	.714
Virginia	9	–	7	.563	22	–	10	.688
No. 20 NC State	9	–	7	.563	24	–	13	.649
Miami (FL)	9	–	7	.563	20	–	13	.606
Clemson	8	–	8	.500	16	–	15	.516
Maryland	6	–	10	.375	17	–	15	.531
Virginia Tech	4	–	12	.250	16	–	17	.485
Wake Forest	4	–	12	.250	13	–	18	.419
Georgia Tech	4	–	12	.250	11	–	20	.355
Boston College	4	–	12	.250	9	–	22	.290
† 2012 ACC tournament winner As of April 3, 2012; Rankings from Coaches Poll

Teams are seeded based on the final regular season standings, with ties broken under an ACC policy.

2012 ACC Men's Basketball Tournament seeds
Seed	School	Conf.	Over.	Tiebreaker
1^{†‡}	North Carolina	14–2	27–4	
2^{†}	Duke	13–3	26–5	
3^{†}	Florida State	12–4	21–9	
4^{†}	Virginia	9–7	22–8	2–0 vs NC State and Miami
5	NC State	9–7	20–11	2–1 vs Virginia and Miami
6	Miami	9–7	18–11	0–3 vs Virginia and NC State
7	Clemson	8–8	16–14	
8	Maryland	6–10	16–14	
9	Wake Forest	4–12	13–17	4–1 vs VT, GT, and BC
10	Virginia Tech	4–12	15–16	2–2 vs WF, GT, and BC
11	Georgia Tech	4–12	12–18	2–3 vs WF, VT, and BC
12	Boston College	4–12	9–21	2–4 vs WF, VT, and GT
‡ – ACC regular season champions. † – Received a bye in the conference tournament. Overall records are as of the end of the regular season.

== Schedule ==
Session	Game	Time*	Matchup^{#}	Television	Attendance
First round – Thursday, March 8
1	1	Noon	#8 Maryland vs. No. 9 Wake Forest	ESPNU/ACC Network	19,520
1	2	2:00 pm	#5 NC State vs. No. 12 Boston College	ESPNU/ACC Network	19,520
2	3	7:00 pm	#7 Clemson vs. #10 Virginia Tech	ESPNU/ACC Network	19,520
2	4	9:00 pm	#6 Miami vs. No. 11 Georgia Tech	ESPNU/ACC Network	19,520
Quarterfinals – Friday, March 9
3	5	Noon	#1 North Carolina vs. No. 8 Maryland	ESPN2/ACC Network	19,520
3	6	2:00 pm	#4 Virginia vs. #5 NC State	ESPN2/ACC Network	19,520
4	7	7:00 pm	#2 Duke vs. No. 10 Virginia Tech	ESPN2/ACC Network	19,520
4	8	9:00 pm	#3 Florida State vs. No. 6 Miami	ESPN2/ACC Network	19,520
Semifinals – Saturday, March 10
5	9	1:00 pm	#1 North Carolina vs. No. 5 NC State	ESPN/ACC Network	19,520
5	10	3:00 pm	#2 Duke vs. #3 Florida State	ESPN/ACC Network	19,520
Championship Game – Sunday, March 11
6	11	1:00 pm	#1 North Carolina vs. #3 Florida State	ESPN/ACC Network	19,520
*Game Times in ET. #-Rankings denote tournament seeding.

== Bracket ==
First round Thursday, March 8, 2012; ESPNU/ACC Network
8	Maryland	82
9	Wake Forest	60
5	NC State	78
12	Boston College	57
7	Clemson	63
10	Virginia Tech	68
6	Miami	54
11	Georgia Tech	36

Quarterfinals; Friday, March 9, 2012; ESPN2/ACC Network
1	#4 North Carolina	85
8	Maryland	69
4	Virginia	64
5	NC State	67
2	#6 Duke	60
10	Virginia Tech	56
3	#17 Florida State	82
6	Miami	71

Semifinals; Saturday, March 10, 2012; ESPN/ACC Network
1	#4 North Carolina	69
5	NC State	67
2	#6 Duke	59
3	#17 Florida State	62

Championship Game; Sunday, March 11, 2012; ESPN/ACC Network
1	#4 North Carolina	82
3	#17 Florida State	85

AP Rankings at time of tournament

== Game summaries ==
ESPNU
ACC Network

Mar 8
12:00 pm

Recap

Maryland Terrapins 82, Wake Forest Demon Deacons 60
Scoring by half: 36–31, 46–29
Pts: Terrell Stoglin 25; Rebs: Terrell Stoglin 7 Asts: 2 tied with 4	Pts: Travis McKie 22; Rebs: Travis McKie 8 Asts: Nikita Mescheriakov 4

Philips Arena
Atlanta, GA
Attendance: 19,520
Referees: Jamie Luckie, Mike Eades, Bernard Clinton

ESPNU
ACC Network

Mar 8
2:30 pm

Recap

North Carolina State Wolfpack 78, Boston College Eagles 57
Scoring by half: 37–24, 41–33
Pts: Scott Wood 22; Rebs: Richard Howell 12; Asts: Richard Howell 4	Pts: Ryan Anderson 22; Rebs: Ryan Anderson 12; Asts: Lonnie Jackson 5

Philips Arena
Atlanta, GA
Attendance: 19,520
Referees: Les Jones, Brian Dorsey, Sean Hull

ESPNU
ACC Network

Mar 8
7:00 pm

Recap

Clemson Tigers 63, Virginia Tech Hokies 68
Scoring by half: 35–30, 28–38
Pts: Devin Coleman 15; Rebs: Devin Booker 8 Asts: Tanner Smith 6	Pts: Erick Green 24; Rebs: Dorian Finney-Smith 8 Asts: 2 tied with 4

Philips Arena
Atlanta, GA
Attendance: 19,520
Referees: Roger Ayers, Bryan Kersey, Sean Corbin

ESPNU
ACC Network

Mar 8
9:30 pm

Recap

Miami Hurricanes 54, Georgia Tech Yellow Jackets 36
Scoring by half: 19–20, 35–16
Pts: Shane Larkin 12; Rebs: Reggie Johnson 9 Asts: Shane Larkin 3	Pts: Mfon Udofia 13; Rebs: Daniel Miller 10; Asts: Daniel Miller 2

Philips Arena
Atlanta, GA
Attendance: 19,520
Referees: Ray Natili, Brad Nestor, Raymie Styons

ESPN2
ACC Network

Mar 9
12:00 pm

Recap

#4 North Carolina Tar Heels 85, Maryland Terrapins 69
Scoring by half: 36–26, 49–43
Pts: 2 tied with 15; Rebs: James Michael McAdoo 8 Asts: Kendall Marshall 12	Pts: Terrell Stoglin 30; Rebs: Sean Mosley 6 Asts: Mychal Parker 3

Philips Arena
Atlanta, GA
Attendance: 19,520
Referees: Roger Ayers, Ray Natili, Sean Hull

ESPN2
ACC Network

Mar 9
2:30 pm

Recap

Virginia Cavaliers 64, North Carolina State Wolfpack 67
Scoring by half: 33–36, 31–31
Pts: Mike Scott 23; Rebs: Akil Mitchell 12; Asts: Jontel Evans 4	Pts: C. J. Leslie 19; Rebs: C. J. Leslie 14; Asts: Lorenzo Brown 8

Philips Arena
Atlanta, GA
Attendance: 19,520
Referees: Bryan Kersey, Tim Nestor, Brian Dorsey

ESPN2
ACC Network

Mar 9
7:00 pm

Recap

#6 Duke Blue Devils 60, Virginia Tech Hokies 56
Scoring by half: 31–26, 29–30
Pts: Austin Rivers 17; Rebs: Mason Plumlee 10; Asts: Seth Curry 5	Pts: Erick Green 16; Rebs: Dorian Finney-Smith 12; Asts: 3 tied with 2

Philips Arena
Atlanta, GA
Attendance: 19,520
Referees: Jamie Luckie, Bernard Clinton, Mike Eades

ESPN2
ACC Network

Mar 9
9:30 pm

Recap

#17 Florida State Seminoles 82, Miami Hurricanes 71
Scoring by half: 36–27, 46–44
Pts: Michael Snaer 20; Rebs: Bernard James 7 Asts: Luke Loucks 5	Pts: Malcolm Grant 19; Rebs: Reggie Johnson 10; Asts: Shane Larkin 5

Philips Arena
Atlanta, GA
Attendance: 19,520
Referees: Les Jones, Sean Corbin, Tim Kelly

ESPN
ACC Network

Mar 10
1:00 pm

Recap

#4 North Carolina Tar Heels 69, North Carolina State Wolfpack 67
Scoring by half: 31–34, 38–33
Pts: Tyler Zeller 23; Rebs: Tyler Zeller 9 Asts: Kendall Marshall 10	Pts: C. J. Leslie 22; Rebs: Richard Howell 12; Asts: Lorenzo Brown 6

Philips Arena
Atlanta, GA
Attendance: 19,520
Referees: Ray Natili, Tim Nestor, Brian Dorsey

ESPN
ACC Network

Mar 10
3:30 pm

Recap

#6 Duke Blue Devils 59, #17 Florida State Seminoles 62
Scoring by half: 31–33, 28–29
Pts: Austin Rivers 17; Rebs: Miles Plumlee 11; Asts: Seth Curry 2	Pts: Michael Snaer 16; Rebs: Bernard James 7 Asts: Michael Snaer 6

Philips Arena
Atlanta, GA
Attendance: 19,520
Referees: Mike Eades, Jamie Luckie, Sean Corbin

ESPN
ACC Network

Mar 11
1:00 pm

#4 North Carolina Tar Heels 82, #17 Florida State Seminoles 85
Scoring by half: 40–49, 42–36
Pts: Harrison Barnes 21; Rebs: Tyler Zeller 12; Asts: Kendall Marshall 9	Pts: Michael Snaer 18; Rebs: 2 tied with 6 Asts: Luke Loucks 13; FSU 1st ever ACC Bball Championship

Philips Arena
Atlanta, GA
Attendance: 19,520
Referees: Les Jones, Roger Ayers, Bryan Kersey
