= 2011–12 Wake Forest Demon Deacons men's basketball team =

American college basketball season

2011–12 Wake Forest Demon Deacons men's basketball
- Conference: Atlantic Coast Conference
- Record: 13–18 (4–12 ACC)
- Head coach: Jeff Bzdelik (2nd season)
- Assistant coaches: Jeff Battle; Rusty LaRue; Walt Corbean
- Home arena: LJVM Coliseum

2011–12 ACC men's basketball standings
	Conf.				Overall
Team	W		L	PCT	W		L	PCT
No. 6 North Carolina	14	–	2	.875	32	–	6	.842
No. 14 Duke	13	–	3	.813	27	–	7	.794
No. 15 Florida State†	12	–	4	.750	25	–	10	.714
Virginia	9	–	7	.563	22	–	10	.688
No. 20 NC State	9	–	7	.563	24	–	13	.649
Miami (FL)	9	–	7	.563	20	–	13	.606
Clemson	8	–	8	.500	16	–	15	.516
Maryland	6	–	10	.375	17	–	15	.531
Virginia Tech	4	–	12	.250	16	–	17	.485
Wake Forest	4	–	12	.250	13	–	18	.419
Georgia Tech	4	–	12	.250	11	–	20	.355
Boston College	4	–	12	.250	9	–	22	.290
† 2012 ACC tournament winner As of April 3, 2012; Rankings from Coaches Poll

The 2011–12 Wake Forest Demon Deacons men's basketball team represented Wake Forest University in the 2011–2012 NCAA college basketball season. The head coach was Jeff Bzdelik, who was coaching in his second season at Wake Forest. The team played its home games at Lawrence Joel Veterans Memorial Coliseum in Winston-Salem, North Carolina, and was a member of the Atlantic Coast Conference. After another below .500 season, Athletic Director Ron Wellman reaffirmed with an, "Oh, Heavens Yes" that his longtime close friend Head Coach Jeff Bzdelik would continue to be the coach of the Wake Forest men's basketball team for the foreseeable future. In Bzdelik's first 2 seasons, 7 players transferred from the program, while Bzdelik managed to win only 5 ACC games.

== Previous season ==
Wake finished the 2010–11 season 8–24, 1–15 in ACC play and lost in the first round of the ACC tournament.

== Recruiting ==
Wake Forest has a 3-man recruiting class for 2011.

College recruiting
Name	Hometown	School	Height	Weight	Commit date
Anthony Fields; Guard	Detroit, Michigan	Quality Education Academy (NC)	6 ft 0 in (1.83 m)	170 lb (77 kg)	Jan 5, 2011
Anthony Fields; Guard	Recruit ratings: Scout: Rivals: (88)				
Chase Fischer; Guard	Ripley, West Virginia	Ripley High School	6 ft 3 in (1.91 m)	175 lb (79 kg)	May 5, 2010
Chase Fischer; Guard	Recruit ratings: Scout: Rivals: (90)				
Daniel Green; Forward	Colleyville, Texas	Grapevine High School	6 ft 9 in (2.06 m)	210 lb (95 kg)	Nov 2, 2010
Daniel Green; Forward	Recruit ratings: Scout: Rivals: (89)				
Overall recruit ranking:
Note: In many cases, Scout, Rivals, 247Sports, On3, and ESPN may conflict in their listings of height and weight.; In these cases, the average was taken. ESPN grades are on a 100-point scale.; Sources: "2011 Team Ranking". Rivals.

== Roster ==
2011–12 Wake Forest Demon Deacons men's basketball team
Players
Coaches

Pos.	#	Name	Height	Weight	Year	Previous school	Hometown
G	1	Tony Chennault	6 ft 2 in (1.88 m)	195 lb (88 kg)	So	Neumann-Goretti High School	Philadelphia, Pennsylvania
C	33	Carson Desrosiers	7 ft 0 in (2.13 m)	235 lb (107 kg)	So	Central Catholic High School (MA)	Windham, New Hampshire
G	2	Anthony Fields	6 ft 0 in (1.83 m)	170 lb (77 kg)	Fr	Quality Education Academy (NC)	Detroit, Michigan
G	10	Chase Fischer	6 ft 3 in (1.91 m)	175 lb (79 kg)	Fr	Ripley High School	Ripley, West Virginia
F	35	Ryan Glass	6 ft 4 in (1.93 m)	170 lb (77 kg)	Fr	Summit Country Day School	Cincinnati, Ohio
F	41	Brooks Godwin	6 ft 5 in (1.96 m)	210 lb (95 kg)	Sr	Mount Tabor High School	Winston-Salem, North Carolina
F	4	Daniel Green	6 ft 9 in (2.06 m)	210 lb (95 kg)	Fr	Grapevine High School	Colleyville, Texas
G	11	C. J. Harris	6 ft 3 in (1.91 m)	185 lb (84 kg)	Jr	Mount Tabor High School	Winston-Salem, North Carolina
G	43	Aaron Ingle	6 ft 0 in (1.83 m)	175 lb (79 kg)	Sr	Christ School	Weaverville, North Carolina
G	42	Spencer Jennings	6 ft 0 in (1.83 m)	170 lb (77 kg)	Jr	Herbert Henry Dow High School	Midland, Michigan
F	45	Ryan Keenan	6 ft 4 in (1.93 m)	195 lb (88 kg)	Sr	Westbury Christian School	Bellaire, Texas
F	30	Travis McKie	6 ft 7 in (2.01 m)	205 lb (93 kg)	So	John Marshall High School	Richmond, Virginia
F	25	Nikita Mescheriakov	6 ft 8 in (2.03 m)	215 lb (98 kg)	RS Sr	St. John's Prospect Hall	Minsk, Belarus
F	52	Doug Niedrich	6 ft 6 in (1.98 m)	190 lb (86 kg)	Fr	Adlai E. Stevenson HS	Kildeer, Illinois

Head coach

- Jeff Bzdelik (Illinois-Chicago)

Assistant coach(es)

- Jeff Battle (Marshall)
- Rusty LaRue (Wake Forest)
- Walt Corbean (Xavier)

Legend

- (C) Team captain
- (S) Suspended
- (I) Ineligible
- (W) Walk-on
- Injured
- Current redshirt

Roster
Last update: 2012-03-08

== Schedule ==
Date time, TV	Rank^{#}	Opponent^{#}	Result	Record	Site city, state
Exhibition
November 4*; 7:00 pm		Ferrum College	W 82–43		LJVM Coliseum; Winston-Salem, NC
Regular season
November 13*; 7:00 pm, ESPN3		Loyola (MD)	W 75–63	1–0	LJVM Coliseum; Winston-Salem, NC
November 16*; 7:00 pm, RSN		Georgia Southern	W 81–72	2–0	LJVM Coliseum; Winston-Salem, NC
November 20*; 7:00 pm, ESPN3		NC Central	W 93–79	3–0	LJVM Coliseum; Winston-Salem, NC
November 24*; 7:00 pm, ESPN2		vs. Dayton; Old Spice Classic	L 76–80	3–1	HP Field House; Orlando, FL
November 25*; 7:30 pm, ESPN2		vs. Arizona State; 2011 Old Spice Classic	L 56–84	3–2	HP Field House; Orlando, FL
November 27*; 11:30 am, ESPN3		vs. Texas Tech; 2011 Old Spice Classic	W 70–61	4–2	HP Field House; Orlando, FL
November 30*; 9:15 pm, ESPNU		at Nebraska; ACC – Big Ten Challenge	W 55–53	5–2	Bob Devaney Sports Center; Lincoln, NE
December 3*; 1:00 pm, ESPN3		Richmond	L 62–70	5–3	LJVM Coliseum; Winston-Salem, NC
December 7*; 7:00 pm		at High Point	W 87–83	6–3	Millis Athletic Convocation Center; High Point, NC
December 10*; 8:00 pm, ESPN3		at Seton Hall	L 54–68	6–4	Prudential Center; Newark, NJ
December 18*; 1:00 pm, theACC.com		Gardner–Webb	W 67–59	7–4	LJVM Coliseum; Winston-Salem, NC
December 21*; 7:00 pm, theACC.com		UNC Wilmington	W 87–78	8–4	LJVM Coliseum; Winston-Salem, NC
December 29*; 7:00 pm, theACC.com		Yale	W 72–71	9–4	LJVM Coliseum; Winston-Salem, NC
January 2*; 7:00 pm, RSN		Wofford	L 52–56	9–5	LJVM Coliseum; Winston-Salem, NC
January 7; 12:00 pm, ACC Network		Virginia Tech	W 58–55	10–5 (1–0)	LJVM Coliseum; Winston-Salem, NC
January 11; 7:00 pm, RSN		at Maryland	L 64–70	10–6 (1–1)	Comcast Center; College Park, MD
January 14; 1:00 pm, ACC Network		North Carolina State	L 40–76	10–7 (1–2)	LJVM Coliseum; Winston-Salem, NC
January 19; 7:00 pm, ESPN		at No. 4 Duke	L 73–91	10–8 (1–3)	Cameron Indoor Stadium; Durham, NC
January 21; 12:00 pm, ACC Network		at Boston College	W 71–56	11–8 (2–3)	Conte Forum; Chestnut Hill, MA
January 25; 7:00 pm, RSN		Florida State	L 52–75	11–9 (2–4)	LJVM Coliseum; Winston-Salem, NC
January 28; 12:00 pm, ACC Network		at Clemson	L 60–71	11–10 (2–5)	Littlejohn Coliseum; Clemson, SC
January 31; 9:00 pm, ESPNU		No. 6 North Carolina	L 53–68	11–11 (2–6)	LJVM Coliseum; Winston-Salem, NC
February 4; 1:00 pm, ACC Network		at North Carolina State	L 76–87	11–12 (2–7)	RBC Center; Raleigh, NC
February 8; 7:30 pm, RSN		at No. 20 Virginia	L 44–68	11–13 (2–8)	John Paul Jones Arena; Charlottesville, VA
February 11; 4:00 pm, RSN		Clemson	L 58–78	11–14 (2–9)	LJVM Coliseum; Winston-Salem, NC
February 15; 7:30 pm, RSN		Georgia Tech	W 59–50	12–14 (3–9)	LJVM Coliseum; Winston-Salem, NC
February 18; 1:00 pm, RSN		at Miami	L 56–74	12–15 (3–10)	BankUnited Center; Coral Gables, FL
February 25; 1:00 pm, RSN		Boston College	W 85–56	13–15 (4–10)	LJVM Coliseum; Winston-Salem, NC
February 28; 9:00 pm, ESPNU		No. 3 Duke	L 71–79	13–16 (4–11)	LJVM Coliseum; Winston-Salem, NC
March 3; 1:00 pm, ACC Network		at Georgia Tech	L 62–69	13–17 (4–12)	Philips Arena; Atlanta, GA
ACC tournament
March 8; 12:00 pm, ESPNU/ACC Network		vs. Maryland; First Round	L 60–82	13–18 (4–12)	Philips Arena; Atlanta, GA
*Non-conference game. ^{#}Rankings from Coaches' Poll. (#) Tournament seedings in parentheses. All times are in Eastern Time.

== Leaders by Game ==
- Team Season Highs in **Bold**.

Game	Points	Rebounds	Assists	Steals	Blocks
Loyola (MD.)	Harris (20)	Desrosiers (10)	Fields (3)	McKie (3)	**Desrosiers (8)**
Georgia Southern	McKie (23)	McKie (7)	Chennault/Fields (4)	**Chennault/Harris (4)**	Desrosiers (3)
NC Central	**McKie (25)**	McKie (7)	Chennault (6)	Chennault/Fischer (2)	Desrosiers/Mescheriakov (1)
Dayton	McKie (20)	3 Tied (6)	Fields/Harris (4)	McKie (2)	Desrosiers/McKie (2)
Arizona State	Harris (17)	Harris (5)	Harris (2)	5 Tied (1)	Desrosiers (2)
Texas Tech	Harris/McKie (20)	McKie (9)	Harris (5)	Chennault (3)	Desrosiers/Green (2)
Nebraska	Desrosiers/Fischer (13)	Desrosiers (12)	Harris (5)	3 Tied (1)	Desrosiers (2)
Richmond	**McKie (25)**	McKie (7)	4 Tied (2)	Fischer (2)	Desrosiers (4)
High Point	Chennault/Harris (20)	Mescheriakov (7)	Chennault (6)	Fields/Harris (2)	Desrosiers (3)
Seton Hall	McKie (17)	McKie (7)	Chennault (2)	Desrosiers/Harris (1)	Desrosiers/Walker (1)
Gardner-Webb	Harris (18)	Walker (9)	Chennault/Mescheriakov (3)	Chennault/Fischer (2)	Desrosiers/Walker (1)
UNC-Wilmington	Harris (23)	Desrosiers (11)	Harris (4)	Harris/McKie (2)	3 tied (1)
Yale	Harris (23)	Desrosiers (10)	Chennault (6)	Harris (3)	Desrosiers (3)
Wofford	**McKie (25)**	Walker (12)	Mescheriakov/Walker (3)	McKie (2)	Desrosiers/Walker (3)
Virginia Tech	Harris (13)	**McKie (15)**	Harris (4)	3 tied (1)	Desrosiers (4)
Maryland	**McKie (25)**	Walker (9)	Chennault (4)	Chennault (1)	**Walker (8)**
NC State	Harris (10)	Walker (7)	Chennault (3)	Harris/Walker (1)	Walker (3)
Duke	Harris (20)	McKie (10)	Harris (3)	Chennault (3)	Walker (4)
Boston College	McKie (20)	Walker (11)	Chennault (6)	Harris (3)	Walker (6)
Florida State	Harris (16)	McKie (9)	Chennault (3)	4 tied (1)	Walker (4)
Clemson	Harris (19)	McKie (12)	3 tied (3)	McKie (2)	Walker (3)
North Carolina	Harris (19)	McKie (13)	Chennault/Mescheriakov (3)	Chennault/Harris (1)	Walker (3)
NC State	Harris (21)	Chennault (7)	Chennault (6)	Fischer (2)	Walker (2)
Virginia	McKie (16)	Desrosiers/McKie (6)	Chennault/Mescheriakov (3)	Desrosiers (2)	Desrosiers/McKie (1)
Clemson	Harris (18)	Chennault/McKie (4)	McKie (3)	3 tied (2)	Desrosiers (2)
Georgia Tech	McKie (23)	McKie (11)	Harris (6)	Chennault (3)	Walker (4)
Miami	Harris (14)	McKie (6)	Harris (5)	Fischer/Harris (2)	Walker (2)
Boston College	Harris (23)	Desrosiers (7)	3 tied (4)	Harris/McKie (2)	Walker (2)
Duke	Chennault/Mescheriakov (18)	Desrosiers/Mescheriakov (5)	Mescheriakov (4)	Harris (2)	Walker (2)
Georgia Tech	Harris (17)	Mescheriakov (5)	**Mescheriakov (7)**	Mescheriakov (1)	Desrosiers (4)
Maryland	McKie (22)	McKie (8)	Mescheriakov (4)	Harris (3)	Desrosiers (2)
