= 2011–12 Miami Hurricanes men's basketball team =

American college basketball season

2011–12 Miami Hurricanes men's basketball

NIT, Second Round
- Conference: Atlantic Coast Conference
- Record: 20–13 (9–7 ACC)
- Head coach: Jim Larrañaga (1st season)
- Assistant coaches: Eric Konkol; Michael Huger; Chris Caputo
- Home arena: BankUnited Center

2011–12 ACC men's basketball standings
	Conf.				Overall
Team	W		L	PCT	W		L	PCT
No. 6 North Carolina	14	–	2	.875	32	–	6	.842
No. 14 Duke	13	–	3	.813	27	–	7	.794
No. 15 Florida State†	12	–	4	.750	25	–	10	.714
Virginia	9	–	7	.563	22	–	10	.688
No. 20 NC State	9	–	7	.563	24	–	13	.649
Miami (FL)	9	–	7	.563	20	–	13	.606
Clemson	8	–	8	.500	16	–	15	.516
Maryland	6	–	10	.375	17	–	15	.531
Virginia Tech	4	–	12	.250	16	–	17	.485
Wake Forest	4	–	12	.250	13	–	18	.419
Georgia Tech	4	–	12	.250	11	–	20	.355
Boston College	4	–	12	.250	9	–	22	.290
† 2012 ACC tournament winner As of April 3, 2012; Rankings from Coaches Poll

The 2011–12 Miami Hurricanes men's basketball team represented the University of Miami during the 2011–12 NCAA Division I men's basketball season. The Hurricanes, led by first-year head coach Jim Larrañaga, played their home games at the BankUnited Center and were members of the Atlantic Coast Conference.

They finished the season 20–13 overall, 9–7 in ACC play to finish in a three-way tie for fourth place. They defeated Georgia Tech in the first round of the ACC tournament before falling to Florida State in the quarterfinals. They were invited to the 2012 NIT, where they defeated Valparaiso in the first round before falling to Minnesota in the second round.

== Previous season ==
The Hurricanes finished the 2010–11 season 21–15 overall, 6–10 in ACC play, and lost in the quarterfinals of the NIT to Alabama.

=== Departures ===
Departures
Name	Number	Pos.	Height	Weight	Year	Hometown	Reason for departure
Donnavan Kirk	22	F	6'9"	227	RS freshman	Pontiac, MI	Transferred to DePaul
Adrian Thomas	30	F	6'7"	226	Graduate	Pembroke Pines, FL	Graduated

=== 2011 recruiting class ===
College recruiting
Name	Hometown	School	Height	Weight	Commit date
Shane Larkin; G	Cincinnati, OH	Dr. Phillips (FL)	5 ft 11 in (1.80 m)	160 lb (73 kg)	Aug 25, 2011
Shane Larkin; G	Recruit ratings: Rivals:				
Bishop Daniels; G	Raleigh, NC	Word of God Christian Academy	6 ft 3 in (1.91 m)	175 lb (79 kg)	Oct 7, 2010
Bishop Daniels; G	Recruit ratings: Rivals:				
Overall recruit ranking:
Note: In many cases, Scout, Rivals, 247Sports, On3, and ESPN may conflict in their listings of height and weight.; In these cases, the average was taken. ESPN grades are on a 100-point scale.; Sources: "Miami Hurricanes 2011 Basketball Commitments". Rivals.; "ESPN". ESPN.; "2011 Team Ranking". Rivals.

== Roster ==
2011–12 Miami Hurricanes men's basketball team
Players
Coaches

Pos.	#	Name	Height	Weight	Year	Hometown
G	0	Shane Larkin	5 ft 11 in (1.8 m)	160 lb (73 kg)	Fr	Orlando, FL
G	1	Durand Scott	6 ft 5 in (1.96 m)	202 lb (92 kg)	Jr	Bronx, NY
G	2	Bishop Daniels (redshirt)	6 ft 3 in (1.91 m)	175 lb (79 kg)	Fr	Raleigh, NC
G	3	Malcolm Grant	6 ft 1 in (1.85 m)	188 lb (85 kg)	Sr	Brooklyn, NC
G	4	Trey McKinney-Jones	6 ft 5 in (1.96 m)	216 lb (98 kg)	RS Jr	Milwaukee, WI
G	5	DeQuan Jones	6 ft 8 in (2.03 m)	221 lb (100 kg)	Sr	Stone Mountain, GA
F	10	Raphael Akpejiori	6 ft 10 in (2.08 m)	230 lb (104 kg)	So	Lagos, Nigeria
G	11	Ryan Quigtar (W)	5 ft 11 in (1.8 m)	180 lb (82 kg)	Sr	Skyway, WA
G	12	Justin Heller (W)	6 ft 2 in (1.88 m)	185 lb (84 kg)	So	Boca Raton, FL
G	15	Rion Brown	6 ft 6 in (1.98 m)	194 lb (88 kg)	So	Hinesville, GA
F	21	Erik Swoope	6 ft 6 in (1.98 m)	230 lb (104 kg)	So	Lake Elsinore, CA
G	25	Garrius Adams	6 ft 6 in (1.98 m)	200 lb (91 kg)	Jr	Apex, NC
F	35	Kenny Kadji	6 ft 11 in (2.11 m)	251 lb (114 kg)	RS Jr	Douala, Cameroon
C	42	Reggie Johnson	6 ft 10 in (2.08 m)	284 lb (129 kg)	Jr	Winston-Salem, NC
C	45	Julian Gamble	6 ft 10 in (2.08 m)	265 lb (120 kg)	Sr	Durham, NC

Head coach

- Jim Larrañaga (Providence)

Assistant coach(es)

- Eric Konkol (Wisconsin-Eau Claire)
- Michael Huger (Bowling Green)
- Chris Caputo (Westfield State)

Legend

- (C) Team captain
- (S) Suspended
- (I) Ineligible
- (W) Walk-on
- Injured
- Current redshirt

== Schedule ==
Date time, TV	Rank^{#}	Opponent^{#}	Result	Record	High points	High rebounds	High assists	Site (attendance) city, state
Exhibition
Nov 3, 2011*; 7:00 pm		Florida Southern	W 88–78	–	26 – Grant	7 – Tied	3 – Tied	BankUnited Center (NA); Coral Gables, FL
Non-conference regular season
Nov 11, 2011*; 7:00 pm		Tennessee Tech	W 69–58	1–0	15 – Scott	8 – Adams	5 – Scott	BankUnited Center (3,600); Coral Gables, FL
Nov 15, 2011*; 7:00 pm, ESPN3		Rutgers	W 72–57	2–0	19 – Tied	8 – Swoope	4 – Scott	BankUnited Center (3,180); Coral Gables, FL
Nov 19, 2011*; 7:00 pm		North Florida	W 75–62	3–0	14 – Adams	10 – Kadji	3 – Kadji	BankUnited Center (3,483); Coral Gables, FL
Nov 22, 2011*; 7:00 pm, RSN		Florida Gulf Coast	W 60–50	4–0	21 – Grant	6 – Larkin	5 – Larkin	BankUnited Center (3,316); Coral Gables, FL
Nov 25, 2011*; 4:00 pm, FSN		at Ole Miss	L 61–64 ^{OT}	4–1	22 – Grant	9 – McKinney-Jones	4 – Tied	Tad Smith Coliseum (4,721); Oxford, MS
Nov 29, 2011*; 9:00 pm, ESPN2		at Purdue; Big Ten-ACC Challenge	L 65–76	4–2	16 – Tied	7 – Tied	4 – McKinney-Jones	Mackey Arena (13,927); West Lafayette, IN
Dec 3, 2011*; 1:00 pm, ESPNU		Massachusetts	W 83–75	5–2	16 – Scott	10 – McKinney-Jones	6 – Scott	BankUnited Center (3,653); Coral Gables, FL
Dec 6, 2011*; 9:00 pm, ESPN2		No. 21 Memphis	L 54–71	5–3	12 – Kadji	6 – Tied	5 – Scott	BankUnited Center (4,500); Coral Gables, FL
Dec 10, 2011*; 7:00 pm, ESPN2		at West Virginia	L 66–77	5–4	17 – Grant	6 – Scott	2 – Tied	WVU Coliseum (12,257); Morgantown, WV
Dec 17, 2011*; 12:00 pm, FSN		vs. Florida Atlantic; Orange Bowl Basketball Classic	W 93–90 ^{2OT}	6–4	21 – Kadji	9 – Johnson	5 – Tied	BankAtlantic Center (11,262); Sunrise, FL
Dec 22, 2011*; 7:30 pm		at Charlotte	W 76–61	7–4	18 – Kadji	10 – Kadji	4 – Scott	Dale F. Halton Arena (7,281); Charlotte, NC
Dec 30, 2011*; 7:00 pm		Appalachian State	W 84–54	8–4	17 – Scott	8 – Tied	4 – Scott	BankUnited Center (3,363); Coral Gables, FL
Jan 2, 2012*; 9:00 pm, RSN		UNC Greensboro	W 99–89	9–4	30 – Kadji	12 – Kadji	3 – Tied	BankUnited Center (2,900); Coral Gables, FL
ACC regular season
Jan 7, 2012; 6:00 pm, ESPNU		at No. 21 Virginia	L 51–52	9–5 (0–1)	14 – Kadji	10 – Kadji	3 – Scott	John Paul Jones Arena (11,283); Charlottesville, VA
Jan 10, 2012; 9:00 pm, ACCN		at No. 3 North Carolina	L 56–73	9–6 (0–2)	16 – Kadji	9 – Johnson	4 – Larkin	Dean E. Smith Center (20,096); Chapel Hill, NC
Jan 18, 2012; 7:00 pm, RSN		Clemson	W 76–73	10–6 (1–2)	16 – Grant	7 – Johnson	4 – Tied	BankUnited Center (4,420); Coral Gables, FL
Jan 22, 2012; 12:00 pm, ESPNU		NC State	L 73–78	10–7 (1–3)	20 – Kadji	11 – Kadji	5 – Larkin	BankUnited Center (4,371); Coral Gables, FL
Jan 24, 2012; 9:00 pm, ESPNU		at Georgia Tech	W 64–49	11–7 (2–3)	21 – Kadji	8 – Kadji	5 – Larkin	Philips Arena (5,009); Atlanta, GA
Jan 29, 2012; 1:00 pm, ACCN		at Boston College	W 76–54	12–7 (3–3)	19 – Scott	7 – Kadji	4 – Scott	Conte Forum (5,874); Chestnut Hill, MA
Feb 1, 2012; 8:00 pm, ACCN		Maryland	W 90–86 ^{2OT}	13–7 (4–3)	24 – Scott	8 – Scott	7 – Scott	BankUnited Center (4,611); Coral Gables, FL
Feb 5, 2012; 3:00 pm, ESPNU		at No. 7 Duke	W 78–74 ^{OT}	14–7 (5–3)	27 – Johnson	12 – Johnson	4 – Larkin	Cameron Indoor Stadium (9,314); Durham, NC
Feb 9, 2012; 9:00 pm, ESPN2		Virginia Tech	W 65–49	15–7 (6–3)	15 – Johnson	7 – Johnson	4 – Tied	BankUnited Center (4,292); Coral Gables, FL
Feb 11, 2012; 1:00 pm, ESPN3		at No. 15 Florida State	L 59–64	15–8 (6–4)	14 – Kadji	6 – Tied	3 – Tied	Donald L. Tucker Civic Center (11,971); Tallahassee, FL
Feb 15, 2012; 8:00 pm, ESPN		No. 8 North Carolina	L 64–73	15–9 (6–5)	15 – Scott	9 – Johnson	2 – Tied	BankUnited Center (7,071); Coral Gables, FL
Feb 18, 2012; 1:00 pm, RSN		Wake Forest	W 74–56	16–9 (7–5)	18 – Tied	8 – Johnson	6 – Grant	BankUnited Center (4,121); Coral Gables, FL
Feb 21, 2012; 8:00 pm, ACCN		at Maryland	L 70–75	16–10 (7–6)	16 – Kadji	8 – Kadji	3 – Larkin	Comcast Center (12,871); College Park, MD
Feb 26, 2012; 6:00 pm, ESPNU		No. 15 Florida State	W 78–62	17–10 (8–6)	17 – Scott	7 – Scott	3 – Tied	BankUnited Center (7,261); Coral Gables, FL
Feb 29, 2012; 9:00 pm, FSN		at NC State	L 73–77	17–11 (8–7)	15 – Brown	11 – Scott	3 – Tied	RBC Center (14,682); Raleigh, NC
Mar 3, 2012; 2:30 pm, ACCN		Boston College	W 77–56	18–11 (9–7)	14 – Scott	7 – Johnson	4 – Johnson	BankUnited Center (3,834); Coral Gables, FL
ACC tournament
Mar 8, 2012; 9:00 pm, ESPNU	(6)	vs. (11) Georgia Tech; First Round	W 54–36	19–11	12 – Larkin	9 – Johnson	3 – Larkin	Philips Arena (19,520); Atlanta, GA
Mar 9, 2012; 9:00 pm, ESPN2	(6)	vs. (3) No. 17 Florida State; Quarterfinals	L 71–82	19–12	19 – Grant	10 – Johnson	5 – Larkin	Philips Arena (19,520); Atlanta, GA
National Invitation Tournament
Mar 14, 2012*; 7:30 pm, ESPNU	(2)	(7) Valparaiso; First Round	W 66–50	20–12	18 – Brown	11 – Johnson	4 – Johnson	BankUnited Center (1,229); Coral Gables, FL
Mar 19, 2012*; 9:00 pm, ESPN	(2)	(6) Minnesota; Second Round	L 60–78	20–13	16 – Brown	6 – Brown	3 – McKinney-Jones	BankUnited Center (1,649); Coral Gables, FL
*Non-conference game. ^{#}Rankings from AP Poll. (#) Tournament seedings in parentheses. All times are in Eastern Time.
