= 2011–12 Virginia Tech Hokies men's basketball team =

American college basketball season

2011–12 Virginia Tech Hokies men's basketball
- Conference: Atlantic Coast Conference
- Record: 16–17 (4–12 ACC)
- Head coach: Seth Greenberg (8th season)
- Assistant coaches: James Johnson; John Richardson; Robert Ehsan
- Home arena: Cassell Coliseum

2011–12 ACC men's basketball standings
	Conf.				Overall
Team	W		L	PCT	W		L	PCT
No. 6 North Carolina	14	–	2	.875	32	–	6	.842
No. 14 Duke	13	–	3	.813	27	–	7	.794
No. 15 Florida State†	12	–	4	.750	25	–	10	.714
Virginia	9	–	7	.563	22	–	10	.688
No. 20 NC State	9	–	7	.563	24	–	13	.649
Miami (FL)	9	–	7	.563	20	–	13	.606
Clemson	8	–	8	.500	16	–	15	.516
Maryland	6	–	10	.375	17	–	15	.531
Virginia Tech	4	–	12	.250	16	–	17	.485
Wake Forest	4	–	12	.250	13	–	18	.419
Georgia Tech	4	–	12	.250	11	–	20	.355
Boston College	4	–	12	.250	9	–	22	.290
† 2012 ACC tournament winner As of April 3, 2012; Rankings from Coaches Poll

The 2011–12 Virginia Tech Hokies men's basketball team represented Virginia Polytechnic Institute and State University during the 2011–12 NCAA Division I men's basketball season. The Hokies, led by eighth year head coach Seth Greenberg, played their home games at Cassell Coliseum and are members of the Atlantic Coast Conference. They finished the season 16–17, 4–12 in ACC play to finish in a four-way tie for ninth place. They lost in the quarterfinals of the ACC Basketball tournament to Duke.

== Roster ==
Number	Name	Position	Height	Weight	Year	Hometown
1	Robert Brown	Guard	6–5	190	Freshman	Clermont, Florida
2	Joey van Zegeren	Forward	6–10	220	Freshman	Hoogeveen, Netherlands
3	Allan Chaney	Forward	6–9	235	Junior	Baltimore, Maryland
4	Cadarian Raines	Forward	6–9	238	Sophomore	Petersburg, Virginia
5	Dorenzo Hudson	Guard	6–5	220	Senior	Charlotte, North Carolina
10	Marquis Rankin	Guard	6–1	165	Freshman	Charlotte, North Carolina
11	Erick Green	Guard	6–3	185	Junior	Winchester, Virginia
14	Victor Davila	Forward	6–8	242	Senior	Canóvanas, Puerto Rico
15	Dorian Finney-Smith	Forward	6–8	192	Freshman	Portsmouth, Virginia
24	Joey Racer	Guard	6–1	165	Senior	Berryville, Virginia
25	Will Johnston	Guard	6–3	185	Freshman	Midlothian, Virginia
31	Jarell Eddie	Guard/Forward	6–7	218	Sophomore	Charlotte, North Carolina
32	Paul Debnam	Guard	6–3	195	Senior	Farmville, Virginia
33	J. T. Thompson	Forward	6–6	225	Senior	Monroe, North Carolina
42	C. J. Barksdale	Forward	6–8	232	Freshman	Danville, Virginia

== Schedule ==
Date time, TV	Rank^{#}	Opponent^{#}	Result	Record	Site (attendance) city, state
Regular season
11/12/2011*; 2:00 pm, ESPN3		East Tennessee State	W 64–53	1–0	Cassell Coliseum (7,189); Blacksburg, VA
11/14/2011*; 7:00 pm, ESPN3		Monmouth; NIT Season Tip-Off	W 91–46	2–0	Cassell Coliseum (3,052); Blacksburg, VA
11/15/2011*; 6:00 pm, ESPNU		Florida International; NIT Season Tip-Off	W 78–63	3–0	Cassell Coliseum (3,148); Blacksburg, VA
11/23/2011*; 9:30 pm, ESPN2		vs. No. 5 Syracuse; NIT Season Tip-Off semifinals	L 58–69	3–1	Madison Square Garden (8,293); New York City, NY
11/25/2011*; 2:30 pm, ESPN		vs. Oklahoma State; NIT Season Tip-Off consolation game	W 59–57	4–1	Madison Square Garden (8,477); New York City, NY
11/27/2011*; 6:00 pm, ESPN3		St. Bonaventure	W 73–64	5–1	Cassell Coliseum (8,710); Blacksburg, VA
11/30/2011*; 8:15 pm, ESPN2		at Minnesota; ACC – Big Ten Challenge	L 55–58	5–2	Williams Arena (10,487); Minneapolis, MN
12/04/2011*; 5:30 pm, ESPNU		Kansas State	L 61–69	5–3	Cassell Coliseum (8,782); Blacksburg, VA
12/07/2011*; 7:00 pm, Cox Sports		at Rhode Island	W 78–67	6–3	Ryan Center (3,982); Kingston, RI
12/11/2011*; 4:00 pm, ESPN3		Norfolk State	W 73–60	7–3	Cassell Coliseum (8,869); Blacksburg, VA
12/17/2011*; 4:00 pm, ESPN3		Campbell	W 85–60	8–3	Cassell Coliseum (8,854); Blacksburg, VA
12/19/2011*; 7:00 pm, ESPN3		North Florida	W 84–55	9–3	Cassell Coliseum (8,818); Blacksburg, VA
12/22/2011*; 7:00 pm, ESPN3		Eastern Michigan	W 71–50	10–3	Cassell Coliseum (9,563); Blacksburg, VA
12/31/2011*; 12:00 pm, ESPN2		at Oklahoma State	W 67–61	11–3	Gallagher-Iba Arena (12,500); Stillwater, OK
01/07/2012; 12:00 pm, ACC Network		at Wake Forest	L 55–58	11–4 (0–1)	LJVM Coliseum (10,037); Winston-Salem, NC
01/10/2012; 7:00 pm, ESPNU		Florida State	L 59–63	11–5 (0–2)	Cassell Coliseum (7,256); Blacksburg, VA
01/14/2012; 3:00 pm, RSN		at Boston College	L 59–61	11–6 (0–3)	Conte Forum (5,038); Chestnut Hill, MA
01/19/2012; 9:00 pm, ESPN		No. 8 North Carolina	L 68–82	11–7 (0–4)	Cassell Coliseum (9,847); Blacksburg, VA
01/22/2012; 6:00 pm, ESPNU		at No. 15 Virginia	W 47–45	12–7 (1–4)	John Paul Jones Arena (14,021); Charlottesville, VA
01/25/2012*; 7:00 pm, ESPN3		BYU	L 68–70	12–8	Cassell Coliseum (9,231); Blacksburg, VA
01/28/2012; 2:30 pm, ACC Network		at Maryland	L 69–73	12–9 (1–5)	Comcast Center (16,976); College Park, MD
02/02/2012; 7:00 pm, ESPN		No. 7 Duke	L 60–75	12–10 (1–6)	Cassell Coliseum (9,847); Blacksburg, VA
02/04/2012; 4:00 pm, RSN		Clemson	W 67–65	13–10 (2–6)	Cassell Coliseum (9,426); Blacksburg, VA
02/09/2012; 9:00 pm, ESPN2		at Miami (FL)	L 49–65	13–11 (2–7)	BankUnited Center (4,292); Coral Gables, FL
02/12/2012; 6:00 pm, ESPNU		Boston College	W 66–65	14–11 (3–7)	Cassell Coliseum (9,171); Blacksburg, VA
02/16/2012; 7:00 pm, ESPN2		at No. 20 Florida State	L 47–48	14–12 (3–8)	Donald L. Tucker Center (10,123); Tallahassee, FL
02/18/2012; 3:00 pm, RSN		Georgia Tech	W 74–73 ^{OT}	15–12 (4–8)	Cassell Coliseum (9,847); Blacksburg, VA
02/21/2012; 9:00 pm, ESPNU		No. 25 Virginia	L 59–61	15–13 (4–9)	Cassell Coliseum (9,656); Blacksburg, VA
02/25/2012; 12:00 pm, ACC Network		at No. 5 Duke	L 65–70 ^{OT}	15–14 (4–10)	Cameron Indoor Stadium (9,314); Durham, NC
03/01/2012; 9:00 pm, ACC Network		at Clemson	L 56–58	15–15 (4–11)	Littlejohn Coliseum (8,735); Clemson, SC
03/04/2012; 6:00 pm, ESPNU		NC State	L 58–70	15–16 (4–12)	Cassell Coliseum (9,847); Blacksburg, VA
ACC men's basketball tournament
03/08/2012; 7:00 pm, ESPNU/ACC Network		vs. Clemson; First Round	W 68–63	16–16	Philips Arena (19,520); Atlanta, GA
03/09/2012; 7:00 pm, ESPN2/ACC Network		vs. No. 6 Duke; Quarterfinals	L 56–60	16–17	Philips Arena (19,520); Atlanta, GA
*Non-conference game. ^{#}Rankings from AP Poll. (#) Tournament seedings in parentheses. All times are in Eastern Time.
