= 2011–12 Clemson Tigers men's basketball team =

American college basketball season

2011–12 Clemson Tigers men's basketball
- Conference: Atlantic Coast Conference
- Record: 16–15 (8–8 ACC)
- Head coach: Brad Brownell
- Assistant coaches: Rick Ray; Earl Grant; Mike Winiecki
- Home arena: Littlejohn Coliseum

2011–12 ACC men's basketball standings
	Conf.				Overall
Team	W		L	PCT	W		L	PCT
No. 6 North Carolina	14	–	2	.875	32	–	6	.842
No. 14 Duke	13	–	3	.813	27	–	7	.794
No. 15 Florida State†	12	–	4	.750	25	–	10	.714
Virginia	9	–	7	.563	22	–	10	.688
No. 20 NC State	9	–	7	.563	24	–	13	.649
Miami (FL)	9	–	7	.563	20	–	13	.606
Clemson	8	–	8	.500	16	–	15	.516
Maryland	6	–	10	.375	17	–	15	.531
Virginia Tech	4	–	12	.250	16	–	17	.485
Wake Forest	4	–	12	.250	13	–	18	.419
Georgia Tech	4	–	12	.250	11	–	20	.355
Boston College	4	–	12	.250	9	–	22	.290
† 2012 ACC tournament winner As of April 3, 2012; Rankings from Coaches Poll

The 2011–12 Clemson Tigers men's basketball team represented Clemson University during the 2011–12 NCAA Division I men's basketball season. The Tigers, led by second year head coach Brad Brownell, played their home games at Littlejohn Coliseum and were members of the Atlantic Coast Conference.

== Roster ==
2011–12 Clemson Tigers men's basketball team
Players
Coaches

Pos.	#	Name	Height	Weight	Year	Hometown
G	1	T. J. Sapp	6 ft 2 in (1.88 m)	180 lb (82 kg)	Fr	Fort Lauderdale, Florida
G	2	Carson Fields	6 ft 4 in (1.93 m)	190 lb (86 kg)	Fr	Pewee Valley, Kentucky
G	4	Rod Hall	6 ft 1 in (1.85 m)	210 lb (95 kg)	Fr	Augusta, Georgia
G	5	Tanner Smith	6 ft 5 in (1.96 m)	210 lb (95 kg)	Sr	Alpharetta, Georgia
C	10	Catalin Baciu	7 ft 2 in (2.18 m)	255 lb (116 kg)	Sr	Cluj-Napoca, Romania
G	11	Andre Young	5 ft 9 in (1.75 m)	175 lb (79 kg)	Sr	Albany, Georgia
G	15	Devin Coleman	6 ft 2 in (1.88 m)	200 lb (91 kg)	Fr	Philadelphia, Pennsylvania
F	21	Bryan Narcisse	6 ft 6 in (1.98 m)	225 lb (102 kg)	Sr	North Augusta, South Carolina
F	22	Bernard Sullivan	6 ft 7 in (2.01 m)	225 lb (102 kg)	Fr	Gastonia, North Carolina
F	24	Milton Jennings	6 ft 9 in (2.06 m)	225 lb (102 kg)	Jr	Summerville, South Carolina
F/C	31	Devin Booker (basketball, born 1991)	6 ft 8 in (2.03 m)	245 lb (111 kg)	Jr	Whitmire, South Carolina
G	32	K. J. McDaniels	6 ft 5 in (1.96 m)	190 lb (86 kg)	Fr	Birmingham, Alabama

Head coach

- Brad Brownell (DePauw)

Assistant coach(es)

- Rick Ray (Grand View)
- Earl Grant (Georgia College)
- Mike Winiecki (Richmond)

Legend

- (C) Team captain
- (S) Suspended
- (I) Ineligible
- (W) Walk-on
- Injured
- Current redshirt

Roster
Last update: 2011-03-11

== Previous season ==
The Tigers finished the 2010–11 season 22–12 overall, 9–7 in ACC play, and lost in the second round of the NCAA tournament to West Virginia.

== Schedule ==
Date time, TV	Rank^{#}	Opponent^{#}	Result	Record	Site (attendance) city, state
Exhibition
11/05/2011*; 7:00 pm		Queens	W 68–35	–	Littlejohn Coliseum (3,000); Clemson, SC
Regular season
11/11/2011*; 8:00 pm		Gardner–Webb	W 65–44	1–0	Littlejohn Coliseum (6,000); Clemson, SC
11/16/2011*; 7:05 pm		at The Citadel	W 73–50	2–0	McAlister Field House (5,186); Charleston, SC
11/19/2011*; 7:00 pm		College of Charleston	L 69–72	2–1	Littlejohn Coliseum (5,000); Clemson, SC
11/22/2011*; 9:00 pm, RSN		Coastal Carolina	L 59–60	2–2	Littlejohn Coliseum (6,211); Clemson, SC
11/25/2011*; 7:00 pm		Furman	W 59–49	3–2	Littlejohn Coliseum (7,126); Clemson, SC
11/29/2011*; 9:15 pm, ESPNU		at Iowa; ACC–Big Ten Challenge	W 71–55	4–2	Carver-Hawkeye Arena (10,449); Iowa City, IA
12/04/2011*; 3:30 pm, ESPNU		South Carolina	L 55–58	4–3	Littlejohn Coliseum (7,238); Clemson, SC
12/10/2011*; 4:00 pm, FSN		at Arizona	L 47–63	4–4	McKale Center (12,790); Tucson, AZ
12/17/2011*; 4:30 pm, RSN		Winthrop	W 60–40	5–4	Littlejohn Coliseum (7,584); Clemson, SC
12/19/2011*; 7:00 pm		Alabama State	W 70–45	6–4	Littlejohn Coliseum (7,127); Clemson, SC
12/22/2011*; 2:30 pm, ESPNU		vs. UTEP; Diamond Head Classic quarterfinals	L 48–61	6–5	Stan Sheriff Center (N/A); Honolulu, HI
12/23/2011*; 3:00 pm, ESPNU		vs. Southern Illinois; Diamond Head Classic loser bracket	W 83–75 ^{OT}	7–5	Stan Sheriff Center (N/A); Honolulu, HI
12/25/2011*; 4:30 pm, ESPNU		vs. Hawai'i; Diamond Head Classic 5th place game	L 68–75	7–6	Stan Sheriff Center (N/A); Honolulu, HI
01/01/2012*; 4:00 pm		East Tennessee State	W 65–58	8–6	Littlejohn Coliseum (6,287); Clemson, SC
01/07/2012; 4:00 pm, ESPN2		Florida State	W 79–59	9–6 (1–0)	Littlejohn Coliseum (8,026); Clemson, SC
01/12/2012; 7:00 pm, ESPN2		at Boston College	L 57–59	9–7 (1–1)	Conte Forum (3,829); Chestnut Hill, MA
01/15/2012; 6:00 pm, ESPNU		No. 8 Duke	L 66–73	9–8 (1–2)	Littlejohn Coliseum (10,000); Clemson, SC
01/18/2012; 7:00 pm, RSN		at Miami	L 73–76	9–9 (1–3)	BankUnited Center (4,420); Coral Gables, FL
01/22/2012; 2:30 pm, ACC Network		Georgia Tech	W 64–62	10–9 (2–3)	Littlejohn Coliseum (9,135); Clemson, SC
01/28/2012; 12:00 pm, ACC Network		Wake Forest	W 71–60	11–9 (3–3)	Littlejohn Coliseum (8,134); Clemson, SC
01/31/2012; 7:00 pm, ESPN2		at No. 16 Virginia	L 61–65	11–10 (3–4)	John Paul Jones Arena (10,919); Charlottesville, VA
02/04/2012; 4:00 pm, RSN		at Virginia Tech	L 65–67	11–11 (3–5)	Cassell Coliseum (9,426); Blacksburg, VA
02/07/2012; 7:00 pm, ESPNU		Maryland	L 62–64	11–12 (3–6)	Littlejohn Coliseum (7,321); Clemson, SC
02/11/2012; 4:00 pm, RSN		at Wake Forest	W 78–58	12–12 (4–6)	LVJM Coliseum (10,076); Winston-Salem, NC
02/14/2012; 7:00 pm, ESPNU		No. 22 Virginia	W 60–48	13–12 (5–6)	Littlejohn Coliseum (10,000); Clemson, SC
02/18/2012; 4:00 pm, ESPN		at No. 8 North Carolina	L 52–74	13–13 (5–7)	Dean E. Smith Center (21,750); Chapel Hill, NC
02/21/2012; 7:30 pm, RSN		at Georgia Tech	W 56–37	14–13 (6–7)	Philips Arena (5,412); Atlanta, GA
02/25/2012; 2:30 pm, ACC Network		NC State	W 72–69 ^{OT}	15–13 (7–7)	Littlejohn Coliseum (10,000); Clemson, SC
03/01/2012; 9:00 pm, ACC Network		Virginia Tech	W 58–56	16–13 (8–7)	Littlejohn Coliseum (8,735); Clemson, SC
03/04/2012; 12:00 pm, ESPN2		at Florida State	L 72–80	16–14 (8–8)	Donald L. Tucker Center (11,500); Tallahassee, FL
ACC tournament
03/08/2012; 7:00 pm, ACC Network/ESPNU		vs. Virginia Tech; First Round	L 63–68	16–15	Philips Arena (19,520); Atlanta, GA
*Non-conference game. ^{#}Rankings from AP Poll. (#) Tournament seedings in parentheses. All times are in Eastern Time.
