= 2011–12 Atlantic Coast Conference men's basketball season =

- League: NCAA Division I
- Sport: Basketball
- Teams: 12
- TV partner(s): ACC Network, ESPN, Raycom Sports, Learfield Sports

Regular Season
- First place: North Carolina
- Season MVP: Tyler Zeller, North Carolina

ACC Tournament
- Champions: Florida State

Atlantic Coast Conference men's basketball seasons
- ← 2010–11 2012–13 →

2011–12 ACC men's basketball standings
	Conf.				Overall
Team	W		L	PCT	W		L	PCT
No. 6 North Carolina	14	–	2	.875	32	–	6	.842
No. 14 Duke	13	–	3	.813	27	–	7	.794
No. 15 Florida State†	12	–	4	.750	25	–	10	.714
Virginia	9	–	7	.563	22	–	10	.688
No. 20 NC State	9	–	7	.563	24	–	13	.649
Miami (FL)	9	–	7	.563	20	–	13	.606
Clemson	8	–	8	.500	16	–	15	.516
Maryland	6	–	10	.375	17	–	15	.531
Virginia Tech	4	–	12	.250	16	–	17	.485
Wake Forest	4	–	12	.250	13	–	18	.419
Georgia Tech	4	–	12	.250	11	–	20	.355
Boston College	4	–	12	.250	9	–	22	.290
† 2012 ACC tournament winner As of April 3, 2012; Rankings from Coaches Poll

The 2011–12 Atlantic Coast Conference is the 59th men's basketball season for the league.

== Preseason ==
The conference hosted its 50th annual media event, "Operation Basketball", on October 19 at the Ritz-Carlton hotel in Charlotte, North Carolina. At this event, the ACC media votes on how they believe each team will finish in the conference, the preseason All-ACC team, the preseason Player of the Year, and the preseason Rookie of the Year.

Preseason Poll

1. North Carolina (57 first place votes)
2. Duke (2)
3. Florida State
4. Virginia
5. Miami
6. Virginia Tech
7. Clemson
8. NC State
9. Maryland
10. Georgia Tech
11. Wake Forest
12. Boston College

Preseason All-ACC

- Harrison Barnes (59 votes)– North Carolina
- John Henson (47)– North Carolina
- Tyler Zeller (46)– North Carolina
- Malcolm Grant (32)– Miami
- Mike Scott (20t)– Virginia
- Seth Curry (20t)– Duke

Preseason Player of the Year

- Harrison Barnes (57)- North Carolina
- John Henson (2)- North Carolina

Preseason Rookie of the Year

- Austin Rivers (57)– Duke
- James Michael McAdoo (1)- North Carolina
- Nick Faust (1)- Maryland

== Rankings ==
Legend
Increase in ranking
Decrease in ranking
Not ranked previous week

		Pre	Wk 2	Wk 3	Wk 4	Wk 5	Wk 6	Wk 7	Wk 8	Wk 9	Wk 10	Wk 11	Wk 12	Wk 13	Wk 14	Wk 15	Wk 16	Wk 17	Wk 18	Wk 19	Final
Boston College	AP																				
Boston College	C																				
Clemson	AP																				
Clemson	C																				
Duke	AP	6	6	6	3	7	7	7	7	5	8	4	8	7	10	5	5	4	6	8	
Duke	C	6	6	6	4	5	5	5	5	3	6	4	6	5	9	4	4	3	6	5	
Florida State	AP	RV	25	22	RV	RV						RV	23	21	15	20	15	22	17	10	
Florida State	C	RV	24	20	RV								RV	24	17	21	16	22	17	15	
Georgia Tech	AP																				
Georgia Tech	C																				
Maryland	AP																				
Maryland	C																				
Miami	AP																				
Miami	C																				
North Carolina	AP	1	1	1	5	4	5	5	5	3	3	8	7	5	5	8	7	6	4	4	
North Carolina	C	1	1	1	5	6	6	6	6	4	3	8	8	6	5	7	7	6	4	5	
NC State	AP																				
NC State	C																				
Virginia	AP					RV	RV	24	23	21	16	15	19	16	19	22	RV	24	RV		
Virginia	C					RV	RV	RV	24	23	17	17	21	18	20	22	RV	RV	RV		
Virginia Tech	AP				RV																
Virginia Tech	C																				
Wake Forest	AP																				
Wake Forest	C																				

== Conference schedules ==
=== Composite matrix ===
This table summarizes the head-to-head results between teams in conference play. (x) indicates games remaining this season.

	Boston College	Clemson	Duke	Florida State	Georgia Tech	Maryland	Miami	North Carolina	NC State	Virginia	Virginia Tech	Wake Forest
vs. Boston College	–	0–1	1–0	0–1	1–1	1–0	2–0	1–0	2–0	1–0	1–1	2–0
vs. Clemson	1–0	–	1–0	1–1	0–2	1–0	1–0	1–0	1–1	1–1	1–1	0–2
vs. Duke	0–1	0–1	–	1–1	0–1	0–2	1–0	1–1	0–1	0–1	0–2	0–2
vs. Florida State	1–0	1–1	1–1	–	0–1	0–1	1–1	0–1	0–1	0–2	0–2	0–1
vs. Georgia Tech	1–1	2–0	1–0	1–0	–	1–1	1–0	1–0	1–1	1–0	1–0	1–1
vs. Maryland	0–1	0–1	2–0	1–0	1–1	–	1–1	2–0	1–0	2–0	0–1	0–1
vs. Miami	0–2	0–1	0–1	1–1	0–1	1–1	–	2–0	2–0	1–0	0–1	0–1
vs. North Carolina	0–1	0–1	1–1	1–0	0–1	0–2	0–2	–	0–2	0–2	0–1	0–1
vs. NC State	0–2	1–0	1–0	1–0	1–1	0–1	0–2	2–0	–	1–0	0–1	0–2
vs. Virginia	0–1	1–1	1–0	2–0	0–1	0–2	0–1	2–0	0–1	–	1–1	0–1
vs. Virginia Tech	1–1	1-1	2–0	2–0	0–1	1–0	1–0	1–0	1–0	1–1	–	1–0
vs. Wake Forest	0–2	2–0	2–0	1–0	1–1	1–0	1–0	1–0	2–0	1–0	0–1	–
Total	4–12	8–8	13–3	12–4	4–12	6–10	9–7	14–2	9–7	9–7	4–12	4–12

=== Boston College ===
Date time, TV	Rank^{#}	Opponent^{#}	Result	Record	Site city, state
ACC Regular Season
January 7; 2:30 pm, Raycom		at No. 3 North Carolina	L 60–83	0–1 (5–10)	Dean E. Smith Center; Chapel Hill, North Carolina
January 12; 7:00 pm, ESPN2		Clemson	W 59–57	1–1 (6–10)	Conte Forum; Chestnut Hill, Massachusetts
January 14; 3:00 pm, NESN		Virginia Tech	W 61–59	2–1 (7–10)	Conte Forum; Chestnut Hill, Massachusetts
January 19; 8:00 pm, Raycom		at NC State	L 62–76	2–2 (7–11)	RBC Center; Raleigh, North Carolina
January 21; 12:00 pm, Raycom		Wake Forest	L 56–71	2–3 (7–12)	Conte Forum; Chestnut Hill, Massachusetts
January 26; 9:00 pm, ESPNU		at No. 19 Virginia	L 49–66	2–4 (7–13)	John Paul Jones Arena; Charlottesville, Virginia
January 29; 1:00 pm, Raycom		Miami (FL)	L 54–76	2–5 (7–14)	Conte Forum; Chestnut Hill, Massachusetts
February 1; 8:00 pm, Raycom		NC State	L 51–56	2–6 (7–15)	Conte Forum; Chestnut Hill, Massachusetts
February 4; 1:00 pm, ESPNU		at Georgia Tech	L 47–51	2–7 (7–16)	Philips Arena; Atlanta
February 8; 7:00 pm, ESPN3		No. 15 Florida State	W 64–60	3–7 (8–16)	Conte Forum; Chestnut Hill, Massachusetts
February 12; 6:00 pm, ESPNU		at Virginia Tech	L 65–66	3–8 (8–17)	Cassell Coliseum; Blacksburg, Virginia
February 16; 9:00 pm, Raycom		at Maryland	L 65–81	3–9 (8–18)	Comcast Center; College Park, Maryland
February 19; 6:00 pm, ESPNU		No. 5 Duke	L 50–75	3–10 (8–19)	Conte Forum; Chestnut Hill, Massachusetts
February 25; 1:00 pm, NESN		at Wake Forest	L 56–85	3–11 (8–20)	Joel Veterans Coliseum; Winston-Salem, North Carolina
February 29; 7:00 pm, NESN		Georgia Tech	W 56–52	4–11 (9–20)	Conte Forum; Chestnut Hill, Massachusetts
March 3; 2:30 pm, Raycom		at Miami (FL)	L 56–77	4–12 (9–21)	BankUnited Center; Coral Gables, Florida
2012 ACC tournament
March 8; 2:00 pm, ESPNU		vs. NC State; 2012 ACC tournament first round	L 57–78	9–22	Philips Arena; Atlanta, Georgia
*Non-conference game. ^{#}Rankings from AP Poll. (#) Tournament seedings in parentheses.

=== Clemson ===
Date time, TV	Rank^{#}	Opponent^{#}	Result	Record	Site city, state
ACC Regular Season
January 7; 4:00 pm, ESPN2		Florida State	W 79–59	1–0 (9–6)	Littlejohn Coliseum; Clemson, South Carolina
January 12; 7:00 pm, ESPN2		at Boston College	L 57–59	1–1 (9–7)	Conte Forum; Chestnut Hill, Massachusetts
January 15; 6:00 pm, ESPNU		No. 8 Duke	L 66–73	1–2 (9–8)	Littlejohn Coliseum; Clemson, South Carolina
January 18; 7:00 pm, RSN		at Miami	L 73–76	1–3 (9–9)	BankUnited Center; Coral Gables, Florida
January 21; 2:30 pm, Raycom		Georgia Tech	W 64–62	2–3 (10–9)	Littlejohn Coliseum; Clemson, South Carolina
January 28; 12:00 pm, Raycom		Wake Forest	W 71–60	3–3 (11–9)	Littlejohn Coliseum; Clemson, South Carolina
January 31; 7:00 pm, ESPN2		at No. 16 Virginia	L 61–65	3–4 (11–10)	John Paul Jones Arena; Charlottesville, Virginia
February 4; 4:00 pm, RSN		at Virginia Tech	L 65–67	3–5 (11–11)	Cassell Coliseum; Blacksburg, Virginia
February 7; 7:00 pm, ESPNU		Maryland	L 62–64	3–6 (11–12)	Littlejohn Coliseum; Clemson, South Carolina
February 11; 4:00 pm, RSN		at Wake Forest	W 78–58	4–6 (12–12)	LVJM Coliseum; Winston-Salem, North Carolina
February 14; 7:00 pm, ESPNU		No. 22 Virginia	W 60–48	5–6 (13–12)	Littlejohn Coliseum; Clemson, South Carolina
February 18; 4:00 pm, ESPN/ESPN2		at No. 8 North Carolina	L 52–74	5–7 (13–13)	Dean E. Smith Center; Chapel Hill, North Carolina
February 21; 7:30 pm, RSN		at Georgia Tech	W 56–37	6–7 (14–13)	Philips Arena; Atlanta
February 25; 2:30 pm, Raycom		NC State	W 72–69	7–7 (15–13)	Littlejohn Coliseum; Clemson, South Carolina
March 1; 9:00 pm, Raycom		Virginia Tech	W 58–56	8–7 (16–13)	Littlejohn Coliseum; Clemson, South Carolina
March 4; 12:00 pm, ESPN2		at No. 22 Florida State	L 72–80	8–8 (16–14)	Donald L. Tucker Center; Tallahassee, Florida
2012 ACC tournament
March 8; 7:00 pm, ESPNU		vs. Virginia Tech; 2012 ACC tournament first round	L 63–68	16–15	Philips Arena; Atlanta, Georgia
*Non-conference game. ^{#}Rankings from AP Poll. (#) Tournament seedings in parentheses.

=== Duke ===
Date time, TV	Rank^{#}	Opponent^{#}	Result	Record	Site city, state
ACC Regular Season
January 7; 12:00 pm, ESPNU	No. 5	at Georgia Tech	W 81–74	1–0 (13–2)	Philips Arena; Atlanta
January 12; 9:00 pm, ESPN	No. 8	No. 16 Virginia	W 61–58	2–0 (14–2)	Cameron Indoor Stadium; Durham, North Carolina
January 15; 6:00 pm, ESPNU	No. 8	at Clemson	W 73–66	3–0 (15–2)	Littlejohn Coliseum; Clemson, South Carolina
January 19; 7:00 pm, ESPN	No. 4	Wake Forest	W 91–73	4–0 (16–2)	Cameron Indoor Stadium; Durham, North Carolina
January 21; 4:00 pm, ESPN	No. 4	Florida State	L 73–76	4–1 (16–3)	Cameron Indoor Stadium; Durham, North Carolina
January 25; 9:00 pm, ESPN	No. 8	at Maryland; Duke–Maryland rivalry	W 74–61	5–1 (17–3)	Comcast Center; College Park, Maryland
February 2; 7:00 pm, ESPN/ESPN2	No. 7	at Virginia Tech	W 75–60	6–1 (18–3)	Cassell Coliseum; Blacksburg, Virginia
February 5; 3:00 pm, ESPNU	No. 7	Miami (FL)	L 74–78 ^{OT}	6–2 (18–4)	Cameron Indoor Stadium; Durham, North Carolina
February 8; 9:00 pm, ESPN/Raycom	No. 10	at No. 5 North Carolina; Carolina–Duke rivalry	W 85–84	7–2 (19–4)	Dean E. Smith Center; Chapel Hill, North Carolina
February 11; 4:00 pm, ESPN	No. 10	Maryland; Duke–Maryland rivalry	W 73–55	8–2 (20–4)	Cameron Indoor Stadium; Durham, North Carolina
February 16; 9:00 pm, Raycom	No. 5	NC State	W 78–73	9–2 (21–4)	Cameron Indoor Stadium; Durham, North Carolina
February 19; 6:00 pm, ESPNU	No. 5	at Boston College	W 75–50	10–2 (22–4)	Conte Forum; Chestnut Hill, Massachusetts
February 23; 7:00 pm, ESPN/ESPN2	No. 5	at No. 15 Florida State	W 74–66	11–2 (23–4)	Donald L. Tucker Center; Tallahassee, Florida
February 25; 12:00 pm, Raycom	No. 5	Virginia Tech	W 70–65 ^{OT}	12–2 (24–4)	Cameron Indoor Stadium; Durham, North Carolina
February 28; 9:00 pm, ESPNU	No. 4	at Wake Forest	W 79–71	13–2 (25–4)	LJVM Coliseum; Winston-Salem, North Carolina
March 3; 7:00 pm, ESPN	No. 4	No. 6 North Carolina; ESPN College GameDay	L 70–88	13–3 (25–5)	Cameron Indoor Stadium; Durham, North Carolina
2012 ACC tournament
March 9; 7:00 pm, ESPN2	No. 6	vs. Virginia Tech; 2012 ACC tournament Quarterfinal	W 60–56	26–5	Philips Arena; Atlanta, Georgia
March 10; 3:00 pm, ESPN	No. 6	vs. No. 17 Florida State; 2012 ACC tournament Semifinal	L 59−62	26−6	Philips Arena; Atlanta, Georgia
2012 NCAA tournament
March 16; 7:15 pm, CBS	No. (2)	vs. No. (15) Lehigh; 2012 NCAA tournament second round	L 70-75	26–7	Greensboro Coliseum; Greensboro, North Carolina
*Non-conference game. ^{#}Rankings from AP Poll. (#) Tournament seedings in parentheses.

=== Florida State ===
Date time, TV	Rank^{#}	Opponent^{#}	Result	Record	Site city, state
ACC Regular Season
January 7; 4:00 pm, ESPN2		at Clemson	L 59–79	0–1 (9–6)	Littlejohn Coliseum; Clemson, South Carolina
January 10; 7:00 pm, ESPNU		at Virginia Tech	W 63–59	1–1 (10–6)	Cassell Coliseum; Blacksburg, Virginia
January 14; 2:00 pm, ESPN		No. 3 North Carolina	W 90–57	2–1 (11–6)	Donald L. Tucker Center; Tallahassee, Florida
January 17; 9:00 pm, ESPNU		Maryland	W 84–70	3–1 (12–6)	Donald L. Tucker Center; Tallahassee, Florida
January 21; 4:00 pm, ESPN		at No. 4 Duke	W 76–73	4–1 (13–6)	Cameron Indoor Stadium; Durham, North Carolina
January 25; 7:00 pm, RSN	No. 23	at Wake Forest	W 75–52	5–1 (14–6)	LJVM Coliseum; Durham, North Carolina
February 1; 7:00 pm, RSN	No. 21	Georgia Tech	W 68–54	6–1 (15–6)	Donald L. Tucker Center; Tallahassee, Florida
February 4; 1:00 pm, ACC Network	No. 21	No. 16 Virginia	W 58–55	7–1 (16–6)	Donald L. Tucker Center; Tallahassee, Florida
February 8; 7:00 pm, ESPN3	No. 15	at Boston College	L 60–64	7–2 (16–7)	Conte Forum; Chestnut Hill, Massachusetts
February 11; 1:00 pm, ACC Network	No. 15	Miami	W 64–59	8–2 (17–7)	Donald L. Tucker Center; Tallahassee, Florida
February 16; 7:00 pm, ESPN/ESPN2	No. 20	Virginia Tech	W 48–47	9–2 (18–7)	Donald L. Tucker Center; Tallahassee, Florida
February 18; 1:00 pm, ACC Network	No. 20	at NC State	W 76–62	10–2 (19–7)	RBC Center; Raleigh, North Carolina
February 23; 7:00 pm, ESPN/ESPN2	No. 15	No. 5 Duke	L 66–74	10–3 (19–8)	Donald L. Tucker Center; Tallahassee, Florida
February 26; 6:00 pm, ESPNU	No. 15	at Miami	L 62–78	10–4 (19–9)	BankUnited Center; Coral Gables, Florida
March 1; 6:00 pm, ESPN/ESPN2	No. 22	at No. 24 Virginia	W 63–60	11–4 (20–9)	John Paul Jones Arena; Charlottesville, Virginia
March 4; 12:00 pm, ESPN2	No. 22	Clemson	W 80–72	12–4 (21–9)	Donald L. Tucker Center; Tallahassee, Florida
2012 ACC tournament
March 9; 7:00 pm, ESPN2	No. 17	vs. Miami; 2012 ACC tournament Quarterfinal	W 82–71	22–9	Philips Arena; Atlanta, Georgia
March 10; 3:00 pm, ESPN	No. 17	vs. No. 6 Duke; 2012 ACC tournament Semifinal	W 62–59	23–9	Philips Arena; Atlanta, Georgia
March 11; 1:00 pm, ESPN	No. 17	vs. No. 4 North Carolina; 2012 ACC tournament Final	W 85–82	24–9	Philips Arena; Atlanta, Georgia
2012 NCAA tournament
March 16; 2:45 pm, CBS	No. (3)	vs. No. (14) St. Bonaventure; 2012 NCAA tournament second round	W 66–63	25–9	Bridgestone Arena; Nashville, Tennessee
March 18; 9:40 pm, TBS	No. (3)	vs. No. (6) Cincinnati; 2012 NCAA tournament Third Round	L 52-56	25–10	Bridgestone Arena; Nashville, Tennessee
*Non-conference game. ^{#}Rankings from AP Poll. (#) Tournament seedings in parentheses.

=== Georgia Tech ===
Date time, TV	Rank^{#}	Opponent^{#}	Result	Record	Site city, state
ACC Regular Season
January 7; 12:00 pm, ESPNU		No. 5 Duke	L 74–81	0–1 (7–8)	Philips Arena; Atlanta
January 11; 9:00 pm, RSN		at NC State	W 82–71	1–1 (8–8)	RBC Center; Raleigh, North Carolina
January 15; 4:00 pm, Raycom		at Maryland	L 50–61	1–2 (8–9)	Comcast Center; Raleigh, North Carolina
January 19; 8:00 pm, Raycom		No. 15 Virginia	L 38–70	1–3 (8–10)	Philips Arena; Atlanta, Georgia
January 21; 2:30 pm, Raycom		at Clemson	L 62–64	1–4 (8–11)	Littlejohn Coliseum; Clemson, South Carolina
January 24; 9:00 pm, ESPNU		Miami (FL)	L 49–64	1–5 (8–12)	Philips Arena; Atlanta, Georgia
January 29; 6:00 pm, ESPNU		at No. 7 North Carolina	L 81–93	1–6 (8–13)	Dean E. Smith Center; Chapel Hill, North Carolina
February 1; 7:00 pm, RSN		at No. 21 Florida State	L 54–68	1–7 (8–14)	Donald L. Tucker Center; Tallahassee, Florida
February 4; 1:00 pm, ESPNU		Boston College	W 51–47	2–7 (9–14)	Philips Arena; Atlanta, Georgia
February 9; 7:00 pm, ESPNU		NC State	L 52–61	2–8 (9–15)	Philips Arena; Atlanta, Georgia
February 15; 7:30 pm, RSN		at Wake Forest	L 50–59	2–9 (9–16)	LJVM Coliseum; Winston-Salem, North Carolina
February 18; 3:00 pm, RSN		at Virginia Tech	L 73–74 ^{OT}	2–10 (9–17)	Cassell Coliseum; Blacksburg, Virginia
February 21; 7:00 pm, RSN		Clemson	L 37–56	2–11 (9–18)	Philips Arena; Atlanta, Georgia
February 25; 2:30 pm, Raycom		Maryland	W 63–61	3–11 (10–18)	Philips Arena; Atlanta, Georgia
February 29; 7:00 pm, RSN		at Boston College	L 52–56	3–12 (10–19)	Conte Forum; Chestnut Hill, Massachusetts
March 3; 12:00 pm, Raycom		Wake Forest	W 69–62	4–12 (11–19)	Philips Arena; Atlanta, Georgia
2012 ACC tournament
March 8; 9:00 pm, ESPNU		vs. Miami; 2012 ACC tournament first round	L 36–54	11–20	Philips Arena; Atlanta, Georgia
*Non-conference game. ^{#}Rankings from AP Poll. (#) Tournament seedings in parentheses.

=== Maryland ===
Date time, TV	Rank^{#}	Opponent^{#}	Result	Record	Site city, state
ACC Regular Season
January 8; 6:00 pm, ESPNU		at NC State	L 74–79	0–1 (10–4)	RBC Center; Raleigh, North Carolina
January 11; 7:00 pm, RSN		Wake Forest	W 70–64	1–1 (11–4)	Comcast Center; College Park, Maryland
January 15; 4:00 pm, Raycom		Georgia Tech	W 61–50	2–1 (12–4)	Comcast Center; College Park, Maryland
January 17; 9:00 pm, ESPNU		at Florida State	L 70–84	2–2 (13–4)	Donald L. Tucker Center; Tallahassee, Florida
January 25; 9:00 pm, ESPN		No. 8 Duke	L 61–74	2–3 (13–5)	Comcast Center; College Park, Maryland
January 28; 2:30 pm, Raycom		Virginia Tech	W 73–69	3–3 (14–5)	Comcast Center; College Park, Maryland
February 1; 8:00 pm, Raycom		at Miami	L 86–90 ^{2OT}	3–4 (14–6)	BankUnited Center; Coral Gables, Florida
February 4; 4:00 pm, ESPN/ESPN2		No. 5 North Carolina	L 74–83	3–5 (14–7)	Comcast Center; College Park, Maryland
February 7; 7:00 pm, ESPNU		at Clemson	W 64–62	4–5 (15–7)	Littlejohn Coliseum; Clemson, South Carolina
February 11; 4:00 pm, ESPN		at No. 10 Duke	L 55–73	4–6 (15–8)	Cameron Indoor Stadium; Durham, North Carolina
February 16; 9:00 pm, Raycom		Boston College	W 81–65	5–6 (16–8)	Comcast Center; College Park, Maryland
February 18; 1:00 pm, Raycom		at No. 22 Virginia	L 44–71	5–7 (16–9)	John Paul Jones Arena; Charlottesville, Virginia
February 21; 8:00 pm, Raycom		Miami	W 75–70	6–7 (17–9)	Comcast Center; College Park, Maryland
February 25; 1:00 pm, Raycom		at Georgia Tech	L 61–63	6–8 (17–10)	Alexander Memorial Coliseum; Atlanta, Georgia
February 29; 7:00 pm, ESPN/ESPN2		at No. 6 North Carolina	L 64–88	6–9 (17–11)	Dean Smith Center; Chapel Hill, North Carolina
March 4; 2:00 pm, Raycom		No. 24 Virginia	L 72–75 ^{OT}	6–10 (17–12)	Comcast Center; College Park, Maryland
2012 ACC tournament
March 8; 12:00 pm, ESPNU		vs. Wake Forest; 2012 ACC tournament first round	W 82–60	18–12	Philips Arena; Atlanta, Georgia
March 9; 12:00 pm, ESPN2		vs. No. 4 North Carolina; 2012 ACC tournament Quarterfinal	L 69–85	18–13	Philips Arena; Atlanta, Georgia
*Non-conference game. ^{#}Rankings from AP Poll. (#) Tournament seedings in parentheses.

=== Miami ===
Date time, TV	Rank^{#}	Opponent^{#}	Result	Record	Site city, state
ACC Regular Season
January 7; 6:00 pm, ESPNU		at No. 21 Virginia	L 51–52	0–1 (9–5)	John Paul Jones Arena; Charlottesville, Virginia
January 10; 9:00 pm, Raycom		at No. 3 North Carolina	L 56–73	0–2 (9–6)	Dean E. Smith Center; Chapel Hill, North Carolina
January 18; 7:00 pm, RSN		Clemson	L 73–76	1–2 (10–6)	BankUnited Center; Coral Gables, Florida
January 22; 12:00 pm, ESPNU		NC State	L 73–78	1–3 (10–7)	BankUnited Center; Coral Gables, Florida
January 24; 9:00 pm, ESPNU		at Georgia Tech	W 64–49	2–3 (11–7)	Philips Arena; Atlanta
January 29; 1:00 pm, Raycom		at Boston College	W 76–54	3–3 (12–7)	John Paul Jones Arena; Chestnut Hill, Massachusetts
February 1; 8:00 pm, Raycom		Maryland	W 90–86 ^{2OT}	4–3 (13–7)	BankUnited Center; Coral Gables, Florida
February 5; 3:00 pm, ESPNU		at No. 7 Duke	W 78–74 ^{OT}	5–3 (14–7)	Cameron Indoor Stadium; Durham, North Carolina
February 9; 9:00 pm, ESPN3		Virginia Tech	W 65–49	6–3 (15–7)	BankUnited Center; Coral Gables, Florida
February 11; 1:00 pm, Raycom		at No. 15 Florida State	L 59–64	6–4 (15–8)	Donald L. Tucker Center; Tallahassee, Florida
February 15; 8:00 pm, ESPN		No. 8 North Carolina	W 74–63	6–5 (15–9)	BankUnited Center; Coral Gables, Florida
February 18; 1:00 pm, RSN		Wake Forest	W 74–56	7–5 (16–9)	BankUnited Center; Coral Gables, Florida
February 21; 8:00 pm, Raycom		at Maryland	L 70–75	7–6 (16–10)	Comcast Center; College Park, Maryland
February 26; 6:00 pm, ESPNU		No. 15 Florida State	W 78–62	8–6 (17–10)	BankUnited Center; Coral Gables, Florida
February 29; 9:00 pm, Raycom		at NC State	L 73–77	8–7 (17–11)	RBC Center; Raleigh, North Carolina
March 3; 2:30 pm, Raycom		Boston College	W 77–56	9–7 (18–11)	BankUnited Center; Coral Gables, Florida
2012 ACC tournament
March 8; 9:00 pm, ESPNU		vs. Georgia Tech; 2012 ACC tournament first round	W 54–36	19–11	Philips Arena; Atlanta, Georgia
March 9; 9:00 pm, ESPN2		vs. No. 17 Florida State; 2012 ACC tournament Quarterfinal	L 71–82	19–12	Philips Arena; Atlanta, Georgia
*Non-conference game. ^{#}Rankings from AP Poll. (#) Tournament seedings in parentheses.

=== North Carolina ===
Date time, TV	Rank^{#}	Opponent^{#}	Result	Record	Site city, state
ACC Regular Season
January 7; 2:30 pm, Raycom	No. 3	Boston College	W 83–60	1–0 (14–2)	Smith Center; Chapel Hill, North Carolina
January 10; 9:00 pm, Raycom	No. 3	Miami (FL)	W 73–56	2–0 (15–2)	Smith Center; Chapel Hill, North Carolina
January 14; 2:00 pm, ESPN	No. 3	at Florida State	L 57–90	2–1 (15–3)	Donald L. Tucker Center; Tallahassee, Florida
January 19; 9:00 pm, ESPN	No. 8	at Virginia Tech	W 82–68	3–1 (16–3)	Cassell Coliseum; Blacksburg, Virginia
January 26; 7:00, ESPN	No. 7	NC State	W 74–55	4–1 (17–3)	Smith Center; Chapel Hill, North Carolina
January 29; 6:00, ESPNU	No. 7	Georgia Tech	W 93–81	5–1 (18–3)	Smith Center; Chapel Hill, North Carolina
January 31; 9:00 pm, ESPNU	No. 5	at Wake Forest	W 68–53	6–1 (19–3)	LVJM Coliseum; Winston-Salem, North Carolina
February 4; 4:00 pm, ESPN	No. 5	at Maryland	W 83–74	7–1 (20–3)	Comcast Center; College Park, Maryland
February 8; 9:00 pm, ESPN/Raycom	No. 5	No. 10 Duke; Carolina–Duke rivalry	L 84–85	7–2 (20–4)	Smith Center; Chapel Hill, North Carolina
February 11; 1:00 pm, Raycom	No. 5	No. 19 Virginia	W 70–52	8–2 (21–4)	Smith Center; Chapel Hill, North Carolina
February 15; 7:00 pm, ESPN/ESPN2	No. 8	at Miami (FL)	W 73–64	9–2 (22–4)	BankUnited Center; Coral Gables, Florida
February 18; 4:00 pm, ESPN/ESPN2	No. 8	Clemson	W 74–52	10–2 (23–4)	Smith Center; Chapel Hill, North Carolina
February 21; 8:00 pm, Raycom	No. 7	at NC State	W 86–74	11–2 (24–4)	RBC Center; Raleigh, North Carolina
February 25; 4:00 pm, ESPN/ESPN2	No. 7	at Virginia	W 54–51	12–2 (25–4)	John Paul Jones Arena; Charlottesville, Virginia
February 29; 7:00 pm, ESPN/ESPN2	No. 6	Maryland	W 88–64	13–2 (26–4)	Smith Center; Chapel Hill, North Carolina
March 3; 7:00 pm, ESPN	No. 6	at No. 4 Duke; ESPN College GameDay	W 88–70	14–2 (27–4)	Cameron Indoor Stadium; Durham, North Carolina
2012 ACC tournament
March 9; 12:00 pm, ESPN2	No. 4	vs. Maryland; 2012 ACC tournament Quarterfinal	W 85–69	28–4	Philips Arena; Atlanta, Georgia
March 10; 1:00 pm, ESPN	No. 4	vs. NC State; 2012 ACC tournament Semifinal	W 69–67	29–4	Philips Arena; Atlanta, Georgia
March 11; 1:00 pm, ESPN	No. 4	vs. No. 17 Florida State; 2012 ACC tournament Final	L 82–85	29–5	Philips Arena; Atlanta, Georgia
2012 NCAA tournament
March 16; 4:10 pm, TBS	No. (1)	vs. No. (16) Vermont; 2012 NCAA tournament second round	W 77–58	30–5	Greensboro Coliseum; Greensboro, North Carolina
March 18; 4:10 pm, CBS	No. (1)	vs. No. (8) Creighton; 2012 NCAA tournament Third Round	W 87–73	31–5	Greensboro Coliseum; Greensboro, North Carolina
March 23; 7:47 pm, TBS	No. (1)	vs. No. (13) Ohio; 2012 NCAA tournament Sweet 16	W 73–65 ^{OT}	32–5	Edward Jones Dome; St. Louis, Missouri
March 25; 5:05 pm, CBS	No. (1)	vs. No. (2) Kansas; 2012 NCAA tournament Elite 8	L 67–80	32–6	Edward Jones Dome; St. Louis, Missouri
*Non-conference game. ^{#}Rankings from AP Poll. (#) Tournament seedings in parentheses.

=== NC State ===
Date time, TV	Rank^{#}	Opponent^{#}	Result	Record	Site city, state
ACC Regular Season
January 8; 6:00 pm, ESPNU		Maryland	W 79–74	1–0 (12–4)	RBC Center; Raleigh, North Carolina
January 11; 9:00 pm, Raycom		Georgia Tech	L 71–80	1–1 (12–5)	RBC Center; Raleigh, North Carolina
January 14; 1:00 pm, RSN		at Wake Forest	W 76–40	2–1 (13–5)	LJVM Coliseum; Winston-Salem, North Carolina
January 19; 8:00 pm, Raycom		Boston College	W 76–62	3–1 (14–5)	RBC Center; Raleigh, North Carolina
January 22; 12:00 pm, Raycom		at Miami (FL)	W 78–73	4–1 (15–5)	BankUnited Center; Coral Gables, Florida
January 26; 7:00 pm		at No. 7 North Carolina	L 55–74	4–2 (15–6)	Smith Center; Chapel Hill, North Carolina
January 28; 8:00 pm		No. 19 Virginia	L 60–61	4–3 (15–7)	RBC Center; Raleigh, North Carolina
February 1; 8:00 pm		at Boston College	W 56–51	5–3 (16–7)	Conte Forum; Chestnut Hill, Massachusetts
February 4; 1:00 pm		Wake Forest	W 87–76	6–3 (17–7)	RBC Center; Raleigh, North Carolina
February 9; 7:00 pm		at Georgia Tech	W 61–52	7–3 (18–7)	Philips Arena; Atlanta, Georgia
February 16; 9:00 pm		at No. 5 Duke	L 73–78	7–4 (18–8)	Cameron Indoor Stadium; Durham, North Carolina
February 18; 1:00 pm		No. 20 Florida State	L 62–76	7–5 (18–9)	RBC Center; Raleigh, North Carolina
February 21; 8:00 pm		No. 7 North Carolina	L 74–86	7–6 (18–10)	RBC Center; Raleigh, North Carolina
February 25; 2:30 pm		at Clemson	L 69–72 ^{OT}	7–7 (18–11)	Littlejohn Coliseum; Clemson, South Carolina
February 29; 9:00 pm		Miami (FL)	W 77–73	8–7 (19–11)	RBC Center; Raleigh, North Carolina
March 4; 6:00 pm		at Virginia Tech	W 70–58	9–7 (20–11)	Cassell Coliseum; Blacksburg, Virginia
2012 ACC tournament
March 8; 2:00 pm, ESPNU		vs. Boston College; 2012 ACC tournament first round	W 78–57	21–11	Philips Arena; Atlanta, Georgia
March 9; 2:00 pm, ESPN2		vs. Virginia; 2012 ACC tournament Quarterfinal	W 67–64	22–11	Philips Arena; Atlanta, Georgia
March 10; 1:00 pm, ESPN		vs. No. 4 North Carolina; 2012 ACC tournament Semifinal	L 67-69	22-12	Philips Arena; Atlanta, Georgia
2012 NCAA tournament
March 16; 12:40 pm, truTV	No. (11)	vs. No. (6) San Diego State; 2012 NCAA tournament second round	W 79-65	23-12	Nationwide Arena; Columbus, Ohio
March 18; 12:15 pm, CBS	No. (11)	vs. No. (3) Georgetown; 2012 NCAA tournament Third Round	W 66-63	24-12	Nationwide Arena; Columbus, Ohio
March 23; 10:17 pm, TBS	No. (11)	vs. No. (2) Kansas; 2012 NCAA tournament Sweet 16	L 57-60	24-13	Edward Jones Dome; St. Louis, Missouri
*Non-conference game. ^{#}Rankings from AP Poll. (#) Tournament seedings in parentheses.

=== Virginia ===
Date time, TV	Rank^{#}	Opponent^{#}	Result	Record	Site city, state
ACC Regular Season
January 7; 6:00 pm, ESPNU	No. 21	Miami (FL)	W 52–51	1–0 (14–1)	John Paul Jones Arena; Charlottesville, Virginia
January 12; 9:00 pm, ESPN	No. 17	at No. 8 Duke	L 61–64	1–1 (14–2)	Cameron Indoor Stadium; Durham, North Carolina
January 19; 8:00 pm, Raycom	No. 15	at Georgia Tech	W 70–38	2–1 (15–2)	Philips Arena; Atlanta
January 22; 6:00 pm, ESPNU	No. 15	Virginia Tech	L 45–47	2–2 (15–3)	John Paul Jones Arena; Charlottesville, Virginia
January 26; 9:00 pm, ESPNU	No. 19	Boston College	W 66–49	3–2 (16–3)	John Paul Jones Arena; Charlottesville, Virginia
January 28; 8:00 pm, ESPN2	No. 19	at NC State	W 61–60	4–2 (17–3)	RBC Center; Raleigh, North Carolina
January 31; 7:00 pm, ESPN2	No. 16	Clemson	W 65–61	5–2 (18–3)	John Paul Jones Arena; Charlottesville, Virginia
February 4; 1:00 pm, Raycom	No. 16	at No. 21 Florida State	L 55–58	5–3 (18–4)	Donald L. Tucker Center; Tallahassee, Florida
February 8; 7:30 pm, Raycom		Wake Forest	W 68–44	6–3 (19–4)	John Paul Jones Arena; Charlottesville, Virginia
February 11; 1:00 pm, Raycom		at No. 5 North Carolina	L 52–70	6–4 (19–5)	Dean E. Smith Center; Chapel Hill, North Carolina
February 14; 7:00 pm, ESPNU	No. 22	at Clemson	L 48–60	6–5 (19–6)	Littlejohn Coliseum; Clemson, South Carolina
February 18; 1:00 pm, Raycom	No. 22	Maryland	W 71–44	7–5 (20–6)	John Paul Jones Arena; Charlottesville, Virginia
February 21; 9:00 pm, ESPNU		at Virginia Tech	W 61–59	8–5 (21–6)	Cassell Coliseum; Blacksburg, Virginia
February 25; 4:00 pm, ESPN/ESPN2		No. 7 North Carolina	W 54–51	8–6 (21–7)	John Paul Jones Arena; Charlottesville, Virginia
March 1; 7:00 pm, ESPN/ESPN2	No. 24	No. 22 Florida State	L 60–63	8–7 (21–8)	John Paul Jones Arena; Charlottesville, Virginia
March 4; 9:00 pm, Raycom	No. 24	at Maryland	W 75–72 ^{OT}	9–7 (22–8)	Comcast Center; College Park, Maryland
2012 ACC Tournament
March 9; 2:00 pm, ESPN2		vs. NC State; 2012 ACC tournament Quarterfinal	L 64–67	22–9	Philips Arena; Atlanta, Georgia
2012 NCAA Tournament
03/16/2012*; 2:10 pm, TNT	No. (10)	vs. No. (7) Florida; 2012 NCAA tournament second round	L 45–71	22–10	CenturyLink Center Omaha; Omaha, Nebraska
*Non-conference game. ^{#}Rankings from AP Poll. (#) Tournament seedings in parentheses.

=== Virginia Tech ===
Date time, TV	Rank^{#}	Opponent^{#}	Result	Record	Site city, state
ACC Regular Season
January 7; 12:00 pm, Raycom		at Wake Forest	L 55–58	0–1 (11–4)	LJVM Coliseum; Winston-Salem, North Carolina
January 10; 7:00 pm, ESPNU		Florida State	L 59–63	0–2 (11–5)	Cassell Coliseum; Blacksburg, Virginia
January 14; 3:00 pm, RSN		at Boston College	L 59–61	0–3 (11–6)	Conte Forum; Chestnut Hill, Massachusetts
January 19; 9:00 pm, ESPN		No. 8 North Carolina	L 68–82	0–4 (11–7)	Cassell Coliseum; Blacksburg, Virginia
January 22; 6:00 pm, ESPNU		at No. 15 Virginia	W 47–45	1–4 (12–7)	John Paul Jones Arena; Charlottesville, Virginia
January 28; 2:30 pm, Raycom		at Maryland	L 69–73	1–5 (12–9)	Comcast Center; College Park, Maryland
February 2; 7:00 pm, ESPN/ESPN2		No. 7 Duke	L 60–75	1–6 (12–10)	Cassell Coliseum; Blacksburg, Virginia
February 4; 4:00 pm, RSN		Clemson	W 67–65	2–6 (13–10)	Cassell Coliseum; Blacksburg, Virginia
February 9; 9:00 pm, ESPN/ESPN2		at Miami (FL)	L 49–65	2–7 (13–11)	BankUnited Center; Coral Gables, Florida
February 12; 6:00 pm, ESPNU		Boston College	W 67–66	3–7 (14–11)	Cassell Coliseum; Blacksburg, Virginia
February 16; 7:00 pm, ESPN/ESPN2	No. 20	at Florida State	L 47–48	3–8 (14–12)	Donald L. Tucker Center; Tallahassee, Florida
February 18; 3:00 pm, RSN		Georgia Tech	W 74–73	4–8 (15–12)	Cassell Coliseum; Blacksburg, Virginia
February 21; 9:00 pm, ESPNU		Virginia	L 59–61	4–9 (15–13)	Cassell Coliseum; Blacksburg, Virginia
February 25; 12:00 pm, Raycom		at No. 5 Duke	L 65–70 ^{OT}	4–10 (15–14)	Cameron Indoor Stadium; Durham, North Carolina
March 1; 9:00 pm, Raycom		at Clemson	L 56–58	4–11 (15–15)	Littlejohn Coliseum; Clemson, South Carolina
March 4; 6:00 pm, ESPNU		NC State	L 58–70	4–12 (15–16)	Cassell Coliseum; Blacksburg, Virginia
2012 ACC tournament
March 8; 7:00 pm, ESPNU		vs. Clemson; 2012 ACC tournament first round	W 68–63	16–16	Philips Arena; Atlanta, Georgia
March 9; 7:00 pm, ESPN2		vs. No. 6 Duke; 2012 ACC tournament Quarterfinal	L 56–60	16–17	Philips Arena; Atlanta, Georgia
*Non-conference game. ^{#}Rankings from AP Poll. (#) Tournament seedings in parentheses.

=== Wake Forest ===
Date time, TV	Rank^{#}	Opponent^{#}	Result	Record	Site city, state
ACC Regular Season
January 7; 12:00 pm, Raycom		Virginia Tech	W 58–55	1–0 (10–5)	LJVM Coliseum; Winston-Salem, North Carolina
January 11; 7:00 pm, RSN		at Maryland	L 64–70	1–1 (10–6)	Comcast Center; College Park, Maryland
January 14; 1:00 pm, Raycom		NC State	L 40–76	1–2 (10–7)	LJVM Coliseum; Winston-Salem, North Carolina
January 19; 7:00 pm, ESPN		at No. 4 Duke	L 73–91	1–3 (10–8)	Cameron Indoor Stadium; Durham, North Carolina
January 21; 12:00 pm, Raycom		at Boston College	W 71–56	2–3 (11–8)	Conte Forum; Chestnut Hill, Massachusetts
January 25; 7:00 pm, RSN		No. 23 Florida State	L 52–75	2–4 (11–9)	LJVM Coliseum; Winston-Salem, North Carolina
January 28; 12:00 pm, Raycom		at Clemson	L 60–71	2–5 (11–10)	Littlejohn Coliseum; Clemson, South Carolina
January 31; 9:00 pm, ESPNU		No. 5 North Carolina	L 53–68	2–6 (11–11)	LJVM Coliseum; Winston-Salem, North Carolina
February 4; 1:00 pm, Raycom		at NC State	L 76–87	2–7 (11–12)	RBC Center; Raleigh, North Carolina
February 8; 7:30 pm, RSN		at No. 19 Virginia	L 44–68	2–8 (11–13)	John Paul Jones Arena; Charlottesville, Virginia
February 11; 4:00 pm, RSN		Clemson	L 58–78	2–9 (11–14)	LJVM Coliseum; Winston-Salem, North Carolina
February 15; 7:30 pm, RSN		Georgia Tech	W 59–50	3–9 (12–14)	LJVM Coliseum; Winston-Salem, North Carolina
February 18; 1:00 pm, RSN		at Miami	L 56–74	3–10 (12–15)	BankUnited Center; Coral Gables, Florida
February 25; 1:00 pm, RSN		Boston College	W 85–56	4–10 (13–15)	LJVM Coliseum; Winston-Salem, North Carolina
February 28; 9:00 pm, ESPNU		No. 4 Duke	L 72–79	4–11 (13–16)	LJVM Coliseum; Winston-Salem, North Carolina
March 3; 1:00 pm, Raycom		at Georgia Tech	L 62–69	4–12 (13–17)	Philips Arena; Atlanta
2012 ACC tournament
March 8; 12:00 pm, ESPNU		vs. Maryland; 2012 ACC tournament first round	L 60–82	13–18	Philips Arena; Atlanta, Georgia
*Non-conference game. ^{#}Rankings from AP Poll. (#) Tournament seedings in parentheses.

== Season awards ==
Player of the Year

- Tyler Zeller

Rookie of the Year

- Austin Rivers

Coach of the Year

- Leonard Hamilton

Defensive Player of the Year

- John Henson

All-Atlantic Coast Conference

First Team
- Tyler Zeller^{1} – North Carolina
- Mike Scott – Virginia
- John Henson – North Carolina
- Austin Rivers – Duke
- Harrison Barnes – North Carolina

1 – Denotes unanimous selection

Second Team
- Kendall Marshall – North Carolina
- Terrell Stoglin – Maryland
- Michael Snaer – Florida State
- C. J. Leslie – North Carolina State
- Erick Green – Virginia Tech
Third Team
- Seth Curry – Duke
- C. J. Harris – Wake Forest
- Lorenzo Brown – North Carolina State
- Kenny Kadji – Miami
- Mason Plumlee – Duke

All-ACC Freshman team

- Austin Rivers^{1} – Duke
- Ryan Anderson ^{1}– Boston College
- Dorian Finney-Smith – Virginia Tech
- Shane Larkin – Miami
- Nick Faust – Maryland

1 – Denotes unanimous selection

All-ACC Defensive team

- John Henson^{1} – North Carolina
- Bernard James – Florida State
- Jontel Evans – Virginia
- Michael Snaer – Florida State
- Andre Young – Clemson

1 – Denotes unanimous selection

=== 2012 NBA draft ===
The following 1st, 2nd & 3rd team All-ACC performers were listed as seniors: Tyler Zeller, Mike Scott. The deadline for entering the NBA draft is April 29, but once one has declared, the deadline for withdrawing the declaration and retaining NCAA eligibility is April 10. The deadline for submitting information to the NBA Advisory Committee for a 72-hour response is April 3.

The following ACC underclassmen have sought the advice of the NBA's undergraduate advisory committee to determine his draft prospects:
The following ACC underclassmen declared early for the 2012 draft: Austin Rivers, Harrison Barnes, Kendall Marshall, John Henson, Terrell Stoglin
The following ACC underclassmen entered their name in the draft but who did not hire agents and opted to return to college:

Round	Pick	Player	Position	Nationality	Team	School/club team
1	7	Harrison Barnes	SF	United States	Golden State Warriors	North Carolina (So.)
1	10	Austin Rivers	SG	United States	New Orleans Hornets	Duke (Fr.)
1	13	Kendall Marshall	PG	United States	Phoenix Suns	North Carolina (So.)
1	14	John Henson	PF	United States	Milwaukee Bucks (from Houston)	North Carolina (Jr.)
1	17	Tyler Zeller	C	United States	Dallas Mavericks	North Carolina (Sr.)
1	26	Miles Plumlee	PF	United States	Indiana Pacers	Duke (Sr.)
2	33	Bernard James	PF	United States	Cleveland Cavaliers (traded to Dallas)	Florida St. (Sr.)
2	43	Mike Scott	PF	United States	Atlanta Hawks (from Phoenix)	Virginia (Sr.)
