= Florida State Seminoles men's basketball statistical leaders =

The Florida State Seminoles men's basketball statistical leaders are individual statistical leaders of the Florida State Seminoles men's basketball program in various categories, including points, rebounds, assists, steals, and blocks. Within those areas, the lists identify single-game, single-season, and career leaders. The Seminoles represent Florida State University in the NCAA's Atlantic Coast Conference.

Florida State began competing in intercollegiate basketball in 1947. However, the school's record book does not generally list records from before the 1950s, as records from before this period are often incomplete and inconsistent. Since scoring was much lower in this era, and teams played much fewer games during a typical season, it is likely that few or no players from this era would appear on these lists anyway.

The NCAA did not officially record assists as a stat until the 1983–84 season, and blocks and steals until the 1985–86 season, but Florida State's record books includes players in these stats before these seasons. These lists are updated through the end of the 2020–21 season.

== Scoring ==
Career
Rk	Player	Points	Seasons
1	Bob Sura	2130	1991–92 1992–93 1993–94 1994–95
2	Jim Oler	1817	1952–53 1953–54 1954–55 1955–56
3	James Collins	1793	1993–94 1994–95 1995–96 1996–97
4	Mickey Dillard	1734	1977–78 1978–79 1979–80 1980–81
5	Toney Douglas	1655	2006–07 2007–08 2008–09
6	Doug Edwards	1604	1990–91 1991–92 1992–93
7	George McCloud	1574	1985–86 1986–87 1987–88 1988–89
8	Michael Snaer	1560	2009–10 2010–11 2011–12 2012–13
9	Al Thornton	1521	2003–04 2004–05 2005–06 2006–07
10	Harry Davis	1514	1974–75 1975–76 1976–77 1977–78

Season
Rk	Player	Points	Season
1	Toney Douglas	751	2008–09
2	Jim Oler	742	1955–56
3	Al Thornton	690	2006–07
4	George McCloud	683	1988–89
5	Bob Sura	675	1992–93
6	Sam Cassell	641	1992–93
7	Mickey Dillard	635	1979–80
8	Murray Brown	629	1978–79
9	Tony Dawson	627	1988–89
10	Alton Lee Gipson	626	1983–84

Single game
Rk	Player	Points	Season	Opponent
1	Ron King	46	1970–71	Georgia Southern
2	Al Thornton	45	2006–07	Miami
3	Hugh Durham	43	1956–57	Stetson
	Dave Fedor	43	1959–60	Miami
5	Jim Oler	42	1955–56	Morningside
	Murray Brown	42	1978–79	Auburn
7	Jim Oler	41	1955–56	Georgia Teachers College
8	Pee Wee Barber	40	1986–87	Miami
9	Ham Wernke	38	1952–53	Tampa
	Jim Oler	38	1955–56	Troy State
	Dave Fedor	38	1961–62	Tampa
	David Thompson	38	1976–77	South Alabama
	Tharon Mayes	38	1989–90	Rhode Island

== Rebounds ==
Career
Rk	Player	Rebounds	Seasons
1	Dave Cowens	1340	1967–68 1968–69 1969–70
2	Reggie Royals	1006	1970–71 1971–72 1972–73
3	Dave Fedor	969	1959–60 1960–61 1961–62
4	Greg Grady	793	1972–73 1973–74 1974–75 1975–76
5	Doug Edwards	788	1990–91 1991–92 1992–93
6	Gary Schull	783	1963–64 1964–65 1965–66
7	Lawrence McCray	759	1971–72 1972–73 1973–74
8	Tat Hunter	758	1985–86 1986–87 1987–88 1988–89
9	Corey Louis	755	1994–95 1995–96 1996–97 1997–98
10	Randy Allen	738	1983–84 1984–85 1985–86 1986–87

Season
Rk	Player	Rebounds	Season
1	Dave Cowens	456	1967–68
2	Rick Benson	451	1954–55
3	Dave Cowens	447	1969–70
4	Dave Cowens	437	1968–69
5	Dave Fedor	400	1959–60
6	Reggie Royals	390	1970–71
7	Reggie Royals	351	1971–72
8	Dave Fedor	336	1960–61
9	Gary Schull	331	1965–66
10	Don Boltz	303	1957–58

Single game
Rk	Player	Rebounds	Season	Opponent
1	Rick Benson	32	1954–55	Florida Southern
2	Dave Cowens	31	1967–68	LSU
3	Dave Cowens	30	1967–68	The Citadel
4	Dave Fedor	28	1959–60	Jacksonville
	Dave Fedor	28	1959–60	Rollins College
	Dave Cowens	28	1968–69	Florida Southern
7	Gary Schull	27	1965–66	Jacksonville
	Dave Cowens	27	1968–69	Stetson
9	Don Boltz	26	1957–58	Stetson
	Dave Cowens	26	1968–69	Hawaii

== Assists ==
Career
Rk	Player	Assists	Seasons
1	Delvon Arrington	688	1998–99 1999–00 2000–01 2001–02
2	Otto Petty	602	1970–71 1971–72 1972–73
3	Tony Jackson	561	1976–77 1977–78 1978–79 1979–80
4	Tony William	482	1981–82 1982–83 1983–84
5	Trent Forrest	455	2016–17 2017–18 2018–19 2019–20
6	Xavier Rathan-Mayes	451	2014–15 2015–16 2016–17
7	Bob Sura	435	1991–92 1992–93 1993–94 1994–95
8	Carlton Byrd	401	1973–74 1974–75 1975–76 1976–77
9	Charlie Ward	396	1990–91 1991–92 1992–93 1993–94
10	Luke Loucks	391	2008–09 2009–10 2010–11 2011–12

Season
Rk	Player	Assists	Season
1	Otto Petty	227	1970–71
2	Tony Jackson	216	1979–80
3	Tony William	215	1983–84
4	Otto Petty	202	1972–73
5	Robert McCray V	200	2025–26
6	Kerry Thompson	184	1996–97
7	Delvon Arrington	182	1999–00
	Delvon Arrington	182	2001–02
9	Delvon Arrington	181	1998–99
10	Otto Petty	173	1971–72

Single game
Rk	Player	Assists	Season	Opponent
1	Robert McCray V	17	2025–26	Alcorn State
2	Otto Petty	16	1971–72	South Alabama
	Tony William	16	1982–83	Jacksonville
4	Otto Petty	15	1970–71	Pan American
	Otto Petty	15	1970–71	Samford
	Carlton Byrd	15	1976–77	Stetson
	Tony Jackson	15	1979–80	Ala.-Birmingham
8	Otto Petty	14	1970–71	Biscayne
	Otto Petty	14	1972–73	Northwestern
	Wayne Smalls	14	1974–75	Cal. State-Bakersfield

== Steals ==
Career
Rk	Player	Steals	Seasons
1	Charlie Ward	238	1990–91 1991–92 1992–93 1993–94
2	Delvon Arrington	225	1998–99 1999–00 2000–01 2001–02
3	Trent Forrest	224	2016–17 2017–18 2018–19 2019–20
4	Bob Sura	209	1991–92 1992–93 1993–94 1994–95
5	Tony William	203	1981–82 1982–83 1983–84
6	Tony Jackson	202	1976–77 1977–78 1978–79 1979–80
7	James Collins	191	1993–94 1994–95 1995–96 1996–97
8	Toney Douglas	188	2006–07 2007–08 2008–09
9	Chris Singleton	180	2008–09 2009–10 2010–11
10	Mickey Dillard	165	1977–78 1978–79 1979–80 1980–81

Season
Rk	Player	Steals	Season
1	Sam Cassell	97	1992–93
2	Toney Douglas	90	2007–08
3	Tim Pickett	82	2002–03
	Tim Pickett	82	2003–04
5	Dean Shaffer	81	1984–85
6	Terrell Baker	80	1998–99
7	Tony William	75	1982–83
	Charlie Ward	75	1991–92
9	Tony Jackson	73	1977–78
10	Charlie Ward	71	1990–91
	Kerry Thompson	71	1996–97
	Chris Singleton	71	2009–10

Single game
Rk	Player	Steals	Season	Opponent
1	Chris Singleton	10	2010–11	UNC Greensboro
2	Tony William	9	1982–83	Memphis State
	Charlie Ward	9	1990–91	South Carolina
	Bob Sura	9	1994–95	Georgia Tech
5	Charlie Ward	8	1991–92	Wake Forest
	Sam Cassell	8	1992–93	Jacksonville
	Sam Cassell	8	1992–93	Connecticut
8	Carlton Byrd	7	1976–77	Troy State
	Tony Jackson	7	1977–78	Tulane
	Mickey Dillard	7	1979–80	Florida
	Tony William	7	1982–83	South Florida
	Tony William	7	1982–83	New Mexico
	Dean Shaffer	7	1983–84	Louisville
	Charlie Ward	7	1990–91	Arkansas
	Charlie Ward	7	1991–92	Mercer
	Sam Cassell	7	1992–93	Maryland Baltimore County
	Bob Sura	7	1993–94	UNC Greensboro
	Kerry Thompson	7	1996–97	Butler
	Delvon Arrington	7	2001–02	Clemson
	Tim Pickett	7	2002–03	Davidson

== Blocks ==
Career
Rk	Player	Blocks	Seasons
1	Rodney Dobard	239	1989–90 1990–91 1991–92 1992–93
2	Corey Louis	196	1994–95 1995–96 1996–97 1997–98
3	Boris Bojanovsky	195	2012–13 2013–14 2014–15 2015–16
4	Bernard James	164	2010–11 2011–12
5	Andre Reid	161	1990–91 1991–92 1992–93 1993–94 1994–95
6	Solomon Alabi	159	2007–08 2008–09 2009–10
7	Christ Koumadje	146	2015–16 2016–17 2017–18 2018–19
8	Chris Singleton	136	2008–09 2009–10 2010–11
9	Jarquez Smith	123	2013–14 2014–15 2015–16 2016–17
10	Doug Edwards	121	1990–91 1991–92 1992–93

Season
Rk	Player	Blocks	Season
1	Rodney Dobard	111	1992–93
2	Bernard James	82	2010–11
	Bernard James	82	2011–12
4	Solomon Alabi	75	2009–10
5	Corey Louis	74	1994–95
6	Solomon Alabi	73	2008–09
7	Ike Obiagu	71	2017–18
8	Boris Bojanovsky	67	2013–14
9	Boris Bojanovsky	59	2015–16
10	Mfiondu Kabengele	56	2018–19

Single game
Rk	Player	Blocks	Season	Opponent
1	Andre Reid	9	1993–94	Bethune Cookman
	Corey Louis	9	1994–95	Maryland
3	Greg Grady	8	1972–73	Stetson
	Doug Edwards	8	1992–93	Jacksonville
	Andre Reid	8	1993–94	UNC Greensboro
	Andre Reid	8	1994–95	Florida Atlantic
7	Rodney Dobard	7	1989–90	Auburn
	Rodney Dobard	7	1992–93	UMBC
	Rodney Dobard	7	1992–93	Maryland
	Solomon Alabi	7	2009–10	Boston College
	Boris Bojanovsky	7	2013–14	UMass
	Jonathan Isaac	7	2016–17	Notre Dame
	Ike Obiagu	7	2017–18	Boston College
