= 1972 NCAA University Division basketball championship game =

1972 NCAA Tournament Championship Game
National championship game
| UCLA Bruins | Florida State Seminoles |
| Pac-8 | Independent |
| (29-0) | (27-5) |
|---|---|
| 81 | 76 |
| Head coach: John Wooden | Head coach: Hugh Durham |
- AP: 1
- Coaches: 1
- AP: 10
- Coaches: 10
| | 1st half | 2nd half | Total |
|---|---|---|---|
| UCLA Bruins | 50 | 31 | 81 |
| Florida State Seminoles | 39 | 37 | 76 |
- Date: March 25, 1972
- Venue: Los Angeles Memorial Sports Arena, Los Angeles, California
- MVP: Bill Walton, UCLA

United States TV coverage
- Network: NBC
- Announcers: Curt Gowdy and Tom Hawkins

The 1972 NCAA University Division Basketball Championship Game was the finals of the 1972 NCAA University Division basketball tournament and it determined the national champion for the 1971-72 NCAA University Division men's basketball season. The game was played on March 25, 1972, at the Los Angeles Memorial Sports Arena in Los Angeles, California and featured the five-time defending national champion UCLA Bruins of the Pacific-8 Conference, and the independent Florida State Seminoles.

The Bruins narrowly defeated the Seminoles to win their sixth consecutive national championship.

== Participating teams ==
=== UCLA Bruins ===
- West
  - UCLA 90, Weber State 58
  - UCLA 73, Long Beach State 57
- Final Four
  - UCLA 96, Louisville 77

=== Florida State Seminoles ===
- Mideast
  - Florida State 83, Eastern Kentucky 81
  - Florida State 70, Minnesota 56
  - Florida State 73, Kentucky 54
- Final Four
  - Florida State 79, North Carolina 75

== Game summary ==
NBC

March 25, 1972

#1 UCLA Bruins 81, #10 Florida State Seminoles 76
Scoring by half: 50-39, 31-37
| Pts: Bill Walton 24; Rebs: Bill Walton 20; Asts: Tommy Curtis 6 | Pts: Ron King 27; Rebs: Reggie Royals 10; Asts: Greg Samuel 7 |

Los Angeles Memorial Sports Arena, Los Angeles, California
Attendance: 15,063
