= Luke Loucks =

American basketball player and coach (born 1990)

Florida State Seminoles
- Title: Head coach
- League: Atlantic Coast Conference

Personal information
- Born: April 1, 1990 (age 36)
- Listed height: 193 cm (6 ft 4 in)
- Listed weight: 93 kg (205 lb)

Career information
- High school: Clearwater (Clearwater, Florida)
- College: Florida State (2008–2012)
- NBA draft: 2012: undrafted
- Playing career: 2012–2016
- Position: Point guard / shooting guard
- Coaching career: 2016–present

Career history

Playing
- 2012–2013: VEF Rīga
- 2013: Apollon
- 2013–2014: Kangoeroes Willebroek
- 2014: Maine Red Claws
- 2014–2015: Erie BayHawks
- 2015: Maine Red Claws
- 2015–2016: Hebeisen White Wings

Coaching
- 2016–2021: Golden State Warriors (assistant)
- 2022–2025: Sacramento Kings (assistant)
- 2025–present: Florida State

Career highlights
- As assistant coach: 2× NBA champion (2017, 2018)

Luke Isaac Rhoad Loucks (born April 1, 1990) is an American basketball coach and former player who currently serves as head coach of the Florida State Seminoles men's basketball team in the Atlantic Coast Conference. He played college basketball for the Florida State Seminoles between 2008 and 2012 before playing professionally in Latvia, Cyprus, Belgium, Germany, and the NBA Development League. Loucks joined the Golden State Warriors of the NBA in 2016 in a paid internship position. He served as a player development coach with the Warriors between 2017 and 2021. He joined the Sacramento Kings as an assistant in 2022 and served in the role until 2025 when he returned to his alma mater, joining the Seminoles as head coach.

== High school career ==
Loucks attended Clearwater High School in Clearwater, Florida, where he was a four-year member of the varsity basketball team and team captain as a sophomore, junior and senior. As a freshman in 2004–05, Clearwater won district and regional championships and was the state tournament runner-up. As a sophomore in 2005–06, he led the Tornadoes to the North Division Conference championship and finished as the district runner-up.

As a junior in 2006–07, Loucks averaged 14.0 points and 6.5 assists in earning all-county first-team honors as he led Clearwater to a 25–5 record.

On November 14, 2007, Loucks signed a National Letter of Intent to play college basketball for Florida State University. He chose Florida State over Georgia Tech, St. Joseph's, Pittsburgh, Wake Forest, Tennessee, South Florida and UCF.

As a senior in 2007–08, Loucks averaged 13.5 points, 7.0 assists, 4.0 rebounds and 3.0 steals and shot 60 percent from the field as he led Clearwater to a 22–5 record. He earned third-team All-State honors from the editors of the Tampa Tribune, third-team All-State Class 5A honors by the Florida Sports Writers Association, third-team All-State honors by Sun Sports / Fox Sports Net, first-team All-Suncoast honors two times during his career by the St. Petersburg Times, first-team All-Pinellas County honors two times during his career by the St. Petersburg Times and regional player of the year honors by the Florida Athletics Coaches Association. As a senior, he also guided his team to the quarter-finals of the regional tournament and led the Tornadoes to the No. 2 seed and the district championship.

=== Football team ===
As a junior and senior, Loucks also played for the Clearwater football team where he was a two-time PCAC All-County honoree. He was a second-team all-county honoree as a quarterback in 2006–07 as he set the school record for passing yards in a game with 423 in a 47–31 victory over Palm Harbor High School. He also threw for 1,989 yards and 11 touchdowns in 2007–08.

== College career ==
=== Freshman year ===
After an outstanding high school career, Loucks joined the Florida State Seminoles for his freshman season in 2008–09. As a freshman, he averaged 3.1 points (eighth on the team), 2.1 assists (second) and 0.9 steals (third) while playing in all 35 games for the Seminoles, earning two starting assignments (against Western Kentucky and at Wake Forest) to make him one of only two true freshman to earn starting assignments during the 2008–09 season. He ranked third among all freshmen in the ACC with 2.1 assists per game, averaged 16.9 minutes (eighth on the team), played a total of 593 minutes and finished fifth on the team with 16 three-point field goals made.

=== Sophomore year ===
As a sophomore in 2009–10, Loucks averaged a career-high 4.4 points (ninth on the team), a career-high 2.8 assists (second), 0.8 steals (fourth) while making a career-high 24 three-point shots (third) and playing in all 32 games for the Seminoles, making one start for the Seminoles in their victory over FIU that allowed them to raise their early season record to 7–2. He also averaged a career-high 19.8 minutes per game as he played both guard positions while concentrating mostly on point guard.

=== Junior year ===
As a junior in 2010–11, Loucks averaged 2.9 points (12th on the team), 1.8 rebounds (10th), 2.2 assists (tie for second), 0.6 steals (seventh) and made 16 three-point field goals. He played in all 34 games for the Seminoles and earned his fourth career start against the Florida Gators. He also shot a career high .725 from the free throw line, finishing as one of five Seminoles with a free throw shooting percentage at above .700 percent as Florida State made it to the Sweet 16 of the NCAA Tournament for the first time since the 1993 season and for only the fourth time in school history.

=== Senior year ===
As a senior in 2011–12, Loucks averaged a career-high 7.7 points (fifth on the team), a career-high 4.3 assists (first), a career-high 1.2 steals (second) and a career-high 3.3 rebounds (sixth), while making a career-high 32 three-point field goals (fourth) and a career-high 51 free throws (fourth). He was one of only three players on the team who started all 35 games (also Bernard James and Xavier Gibson) and ranked third on the team with a career-high 27.0 minutes per game average. He helped lead Florida State to a near school record 25 overall wins, a school record tying 12–4 record in ACC play and a third-place finish in the ACC standings as the Seminoles earned four top four finishes (and four first round byes) in the ACC Tournament. He subsequently earned first-team ACC All-Tournament honors in leading Florida State to its first ever ACC championship with averages of 11.0 points, 7.3 assists and 5.7 rebounds per game. He became one of only three players in school history (also Michael Snaer in 2012 and Toney Douglas in 2009) to earn first-team ACC All-Tournament honors and one of only six players in school history to earn ACC All-Tournament honors.

Loucks finished his four-year college career with 136 career games played (school record) with averages of 4.4 points, 2.9 assists and 2.2 rebounds in 19.6 minutes per game. He was named the Seminoles' outstanding student-athlete at the team award banquets in 2010 and 2012, earned the Otto Petty Most Assists Award and shared the Tip of the Spear Award with his senior teammates at the team banquet in 2012, named to the ACC All-Academic team in 2010, 2011 and 2012, and finally, named to the ACC Academic Honor Roll in 2009, 2010 and 2011.

In August 2011, Loucks earned his undergraduate degree in business management before going on to earn his master's degree in sport management in August 2012.

=== College statistics ===
Year	Team	GP	GS	MPG	FG%	3P%	FT%	RPG	APG	SPG	BPG	PPG
2008–09	Florida State	35	2	16.9	.385	.327	.667	1.3	2.1	.9	.1	3.1
2009–10	Florida State	32	1	19.8	.382	.304	.590	2.5	2.8	.8	.1	4.4
2010–11	Florida State	34	1	14.8	.342	.320	.725	1.8	2.2	.6	.1	2.9
2011–12	Florida State	35	35	27.0	.398	.344	.708	3.3	4.3	1.2	.3	7.1

== Professional career ==
=== 2012–13 season ===
On June 18, 2012, Loucks signed a one-year deal with VEF Rīga of the Latvian Basketball League. In December 2012, he left Rīga after appearing in four Latvian League games and six VTB United League games. On January 2, 2013, he signed with Pizza Express Apollon of Cyprus for the rest of the season. He went on to average 10.4 points, 3.3 rebounds and 6.4 assists in 11 games for Apollon.

=== 2013–14 season ===
On May 28, 2013, Loucks signed a one-year deal with Kangoeroes Willebroek of the Ethias League. In 26 games for Kangoeroes in 2013–14, he averaged 10.3 points, 3.3 rebounds and 4.7 assists per game.

=== 2014–15 season ===
On November 1, 2014, Loucks was selected by the Maine Red Claws in the fourth round of the 2014 NBA Development League Draft. On December 8, 2014, he was waived by the Red Claws. Three days later, he was acquired by the Erie BayHawks. On January 10, 2015, he was waived by the BayHawks. On February 6, he was reacquired by the Red Claws, but was waived again three days later. In 19 D-League games in 2014–15 (10 for Erie, 9 for Maine), Loucks averaged 3.2 points, 1.8 rebounds and 2.8 assists per game.

=== 2015–16 season ===
On September 19, 2015, Loucks signed with the Hebeisen White Wings of Germany for the 2015–16 ProA season. Loucks played most of the season with a ruptured disc in his back. In 29 games for Hebeisen, he averaged 9.3 points, 3.1 rebounds, 4.2 assists and 1.1 steals per game.

In April 2016, Loucks had back surgery in Germany. He then returned to the United States, where he recovered in Tallahassee.

== Coaching career ==
In the summer of 2016, Loucks joined the Golden State Warriors organization in a paid internship position. He served as a film and player development intern during the 2016–17 season, and was a member of the Warriors' championship-winning staff in June 2017 when the team won the NBA championship. For the 2017–18 season, Loucks was appointed the Warriors' two-way player development coach. He was promoted to a player development coach with the full NBA squad in 2019, going on to serve in that role for two seasons.

In 2020, Loucks was hired as an assistant coach and player development coach for the Nigerian national team. He served on the Olympic staff in July and August 2021.

During the 2021–22 NBA season, Loucks worked in basketball strategy and personnel evaluation for the Phoenix Suns.

On August 12, 2022, Loucks joined the Sacramento Kings as an assistant coach. He became the Kings' defensive coordinator in 2024.

On March 9, 2025, Loucks was appointed head coach of the Florida State Seminoles men's basketball team, returning to his alma mater.

== Head coaching record ==
Record table
Season	Team	Overall	Conference	Standing	Postseason
Florida State Seminoles (Atlantic Coast Conference) (2025–present)
2025–26	Florida State	18–15	10–8	T–7th	
2026–27	Florida State	5–1	0–0		
Florida State:		23–16 (.590)	10–8 (.556)		
Total:		23–16 (.590)			
National champion Postseason invitational champion Conference regular season champion Conference regular season and conference tournament champion Division regular season champion Division regular season and conference tournament champion Conference tournament champion

== Personal life ==
Loucks is the son of Mabeth and Lincoln Loucks, and has an older brother, Jacob, who was a member of the basketball team at UCF in 2006–07. His father, a walk-on football player, and two uncles also attended Florida State.

Loucks is married to wife Stevi.
