= 2010–11 Florida State Seminoles men's basketball team =

American college basketball season

2010–11 Florida State Seminoles men's basketball

NCAA tournament, Sweet Sixteen
- Conference: Atlantic Coast Conference

Ranking
- Coaches: No. 19
- Record: 23–11 (11–5 ACC)
- Head coach: Leonard Hamilton (9th year)
- Assistant coaches: Stan Jones; Andy Enfield; Corey Williams
- Home arena: Donald L. Tucker Center (Capacity: 12,100)

2010–11 ACC men's basketball standings
	Conf.				Overall
Team	W		L	PCT	W		L	PCT
No. 7 North Carolina	14	–	2	.875	29	–	8	.784
No. 3 Duke †	13	–	3	.813	32	–	5	.865
Florida State	11	–	5	.688	23	–	11	.676
Clemson	9	–	7	.563	22	–	12	.647
Boston College	9	–	7	.563	21	–	13	.618
Virginia Tech	9	–	7	.563	22	–	12	.647
Maryland	7	–	9	.438	19	–	14	.576
Virginia	7	–	9	.438	16	–	15	.516
Miami (FL)	6	–	10	.375	21	–	15	.583
NC State	5	–	11	.313	15	–	16	.484
Georgia Tech	5	–	11	.313	13	–	18	.419
Wake Forest	1	–	15	.063	8	–	24	.250
† 2011 ACC tournament winner As of March 27, 2011; Rankings from AP poll

The 2010–11 Florida State Seminoles men's basketball team represented Florida State University during the 2010–11 NCAA Division I men's basketball season. The Seminoles, led by 9th-year head coach Leonard Hamilton, played their home games at the Donald L. Tucker Center and were members of the Atlantic Coast Conference.

The Seminoles finished the season 23–11, 11–5 in ACC play and lost in the quarterfinals of the 2011 ACC men's basketball tournament to Virginia Tech. They received an at-large bid to the 2011 NCAA Division I men's basketball tournament, where they defeated Texas A&M in the second round and Notre Dame in the third round to advance to the Sweet Sixteen, where they were defeated by Virginia Commonwealth.

== Roster ==
Number	Name	Position	Height	Weight	Year	Hometown
0	Pierre Jordan	Guard	6–0	170	Sophomore	Dunwoody, Georgia
1	Xavier Gibson	Forward/center	6–11	230	Junior	Dothan, Alabama
2	A. J. Yawn	Guard	6–0	170	Senior	Oceanside, California
3	Luke Loucks	Guard	6–5	205	Junior	Clearwater, Florida
4	Deividas Dulkys	Guard	6–5	195	Junior	Silute, Lithuania
5	Bernard James	Forward	6–10	240	Junior	Savannah, Georgia
10	Okaro White	Forward	6–8	195	Freshman	Clearwater, Florida
15	Terrance Shannon	Forward	6–8	220	Sophomore	Forsyth, Georgia
20	Rafael Portuondo	Guard	5–11	160	Sophomore	Miami, Florida
21	Michael Snaer	Guard	6–5	205	Sophomore	Moreno Valley, California
22	Derwin Kitchen	Guard	6–4	204	Senior	Jacksonville, Florida
24	Andrew Rutledge	Forward	6–6	200	Senior	Tallahassee, Florida
30	Ian Miller	Guard	6–3	190	Freshman	Charlotte, North Carolina
31	Chris Singleton	Forward	6–9	220	Junior	Dunwoody, Georgia
33	Joey Moreau	Guard	6–2	180	Sophomore	Bradenton, Florida
50	Jon Kreft	Forward/center	7–0	260	Junior	Coral Springs, Florida

== Schedule ==
Date time, TV	Rank^{#}	Opponent^{#}	Result	Record	Site (attendance) city, state
Exhibition
November 3*; 7:00 p.m.		Rollins	W 95–74	0–0	Donald L. Tucker Center; Tallahassee, FL
November 9*; 7:00 p.m.		Mid-Continent	W 108–51	0–0	Donald L. Tucker Center; Tallahassee, FL
Regular season
November 12*; 8:30 p.m.		North Florida	W 75–55	1–0	Donald L. Tucker Center (9,562); Tallahassee, FL
November 14*; 3:30 p.m., FSSO/FSFL		at UNC Greensboro	W 97–73	2–0	Greensboro Coliseum (3,675); Greensboro, NC
November 16*; 7:00 p.m., FSFL		Gardner–Webb	W 78–53	3–0	Donald L. Tucker Center (5,899); Tallahassee, FL
November 18*; 7:00 p.m.		at FIU	W 89–66	4–0	U.S. Century Bank Arena (4,167); Miami, FL
November 23*; 7:00 p.m., FSFL		Mercer	W 79–55	5–0	Donald L. Tucker Center (6,215); Tallahassee, FL
November 28*; 7:45 p.m., FSN		No. 16 Florida; Rivalry	L 51–55	5–1	Donald L. Tucker Center (12,014); Tallahassee, FL
November 30*; 7:30 p.m., ESPN		No. 2 Ohio State; ACC – Big Ten Challenge	L 44–58	5–2	Donald L. Tucker Center (10,457); Tallahassee, FL
December 5*; 7:00 p.m., Sun Sports		Hartford	W 60–38	6–2	Donald L. Tucker Center (5,252); Tallahassee, FL
December 12; 6:15 p.m., FSN		Clemson	W 75–69	7–2 (1–0)	Donald L. Tucker Center (7,015); Tallahassee, FL
December 15*; 9:00 p.m., FSFL		Stetson	W 97–63	8–2	Donald L. Tucker Center (5,713); Tallahassee, FL
December 18*; 11:00 p.m., ESPNU		at Loyola Marymount	W 74–63	9–2	Gersten Pavilion (3,193); Los Angeles, CA
December 23*; 1:00 a.m., ESPN2		at Hawaii; Diamond Head Classic First round	W 70–62	10–2	Stan Sheriff Center (8,544); Honolulu, HI
December 23*; 10:00 p.m.		vs. Butler; Diamond Head Classic semifinals	L 64–67	10–3	Stan Sheriff Center (6,667); Honolulu, HI
December 25*; 7:30 p.m.		vs. No. 15 Baylor; Diamond Head Classic 3rd place game	W 68–61	11–3	Stan Sheriff Center (6,367); Honolulu, HI
January 3*; 8:00 p.m., FSSO/FSFL		at Auburn	L 60–65	11–4	Auburn Arena (5,359); Auburn, AL
January 8; 3:00 p.m., ESPN2		at Virginia Tech	L 59–71	11–5 (1–1)	Cassell Coliseum (7,987); Blacksburg, VA
January 12; 9:00 p.m., ESPN		No. 1 Duke	W 66–61	12–5 (2–1)	Donald L. Tucker Center (12,100); Tallahassee, FL
January 15; 4:00 p.m., ACCN		NC State	W 84–71	13–5 (3–1)	Donald L. Tucker Center (10,517); Tallahassee, FL
January 19; 9:00 p.m., Sun Sports		at Miami (FL)	W 55–53	14–5 (4–1)	BankUnited Center (6,600); Coral Gables, FL
January 22; 7:00 p.m., ESPNU		Boston College	W 67–51	15–5 (5–1)	Donald L. Tucker Center (11,604); Tallahassee, FL
January 29; 12:00 p.m., ACCN	No. 22	at Clemson	L 44–62	15–6 (5–2)	Littlejohn Coliseum (10,000); Clemson, SC
February 1; 7:00 p.m.		Wake Forest	W 85–61	16–6 (6–2)	Donald L. Tucker Center (9,729); Tallahassee, FL
February 6; 2:00 p.m., FSN		at No. 23 North Carolina	L 69–89	16–7 (6–3)	Dean Smith Center (20,945); Chapel Hill, NC
February 10; 7:00 p.m., ESPN2		at Georgia Tech	W 72–63	17–7 (7–3)	Alexander Memorial Coliseum (5,902); Atlanta, GA
February 12; 3:00 p.m., Sun Sports		Virginia	W 63–56	18–7 (8–3)	Donald L. Tucker Center (10,266); Tallahassee, FL
February 19; 1:00 p.m., ACCN		at Wake Forest	W 84–66	19–7 (9–3)	Lawrence Joel Veterans Memorial Coliseum (10,932); Winston-Salem, NC
February 23; 9:00 p.m., ACCN		at Maryland	L 62–78	19–8 (9–4)	Comcast Center (15,186); College Park, MD
February 26; 2:00 p.m., ACCN		Miami (FL)	W 65–59	20–8 (10–4)	Donald L. Tucker Center (11,531); Tallahassee, FL
March 2; 7:00 p.m., ESPN		No. 13 North Carolina	L 70–72	20–9 (10–5)	Donald L. Tucker Center (12,030); Tallahassee, FL
March 6; 6:15 p.m., FSN		at NC State	W 72–62	21–9 (11–5)	RBC Center (14,218); Raleigh, NC
ACC tournament
March 11; 9:00 p.m., ESPN2	(3)	vs. (6) Virginia Tech; Quarterfinals	L 51–52	21–10	Greensboro Coliseum (23,381); Greensboro, NC
NCAA tournament
March 18*; 4:10 p.m., TBS	(10 SW)	vs. (7 SW) No. 24 Texas A&M; Second round	W 57–50	22–10	United Center (17,352); Chicago, IL
March 20*; 9:40 p.m., TBS	(10 SW)	vs. (2 SW) No. 5 Notre Dame; Third round	W 71–57	23–10	United Center (18,146); Chicago, IL
March 25*; 9:55 p.m., TBS	(10 SW)	vs. (11 SW) VCU; Sweet Sixteen	L 71–72 ^{OT}	23–11	Alamodome (14,566); San Antonio, TX
*Non-conference game. ^{#}Rankings from AP Poll. (#) Tournament seedings in parentheses. SW=NCAA Southwest Region. All times are in Eastern Time.
