= Gary Schull =

American basketball player

Personal information
- Born: December 18, 1944 Willow Grove, Pennsylvania, U.S.
- Died: February 9, 2005 (aged 60) Melbourne, Florida, U.S.
- Listed height: 201 cm (6 ft 7 in)
- Listed weight: 97 kg (214 lb)

Career information
- High school: Pompano Beach (Pompano Beach, Florida)
- College: Florida State (1963–1966)
- NBA draft: 1966: 7th round, 6th overall pick
- Drafted by: Cincinnati Royals
- Playing career: 1966–1973
- Position: Center
- Number: 13

Career history
- 1966–1968: Phillips 66ers
- 1968–1973: Eldorado/Alco Bologna

Career highlights
- Italian League Top Scorer (1971); No. 13 retired by Fortitudo Bologna (2010)
- Stats at Basketball Reference

Gary Schull (December 18, 1944 - February 9, 2005) was an American professional basketball player.

An aggressive center, Schull played collegiately for Florida State before forging a successful professional career in Italy where he led the Serie A in scoring for a season.

== College career ==
Gary Schull played for Pompano Beach High School and stayed in Florida for college as he joined Florida State in 1962. He led the team in rebounding and was second best scorer in his sophomore season, as he was chosen in the All-State College team.

Graduating in 1966, Schull played for the Seminoles for three years, (Note: Freshmen were ineligible until 1972) scoring 1,122 points (14.8 per game) and grabbing 769 rebounds (more than 10 rebounds a game). Described as “one of the most outstanding and aggressive big men who has ever played for the Seminoles”, he was inducted in the Florida State Hall of Fame in 1985.

== Professional career ==
Selected by the Cincinnati Royals in the seventh round of the 1966 NBA draft, Schull instead played for NABL and AAU side Phillips 66ers from 1966 to 1968.

Despite reportedly being offered a $12,000 contract by the NBA's Seattle SuperSonics in 1968, Schull chose to join Eldorado-sponsored Fortitudo Bologna in the Italian Serie A for $1,000 more, mostly because he wanted to experience life abroad.

Schull quickly gained the fans' admiration with combative displays, for example diving in the stands to reclaim a loose ball on his debut, something unusual at the time. He adapted quite well to the league in his first season, scoring 15,8 points per game over 12 games. However, he missed half the season after injuring his meniscus in February, though he insisted on supporting his teammates from courtside in his wheelchair.

The 1969–70 season saw Schull play all 22 games, posting an impressive 24 points per game. 30 of those points (and 20 rebounds) came on 21 December 1969 as Eldorado Bologna beat cross-town rivals Virtus, with Schull dominating his opponent Terry Driscoll (17 points). This feat was made all the more impressive by the fact Schull was struck by an opposing player during the game but refused to leave the court despite bleeding, ending the game with a bloodied shirt.

Schull established a personal record during the 1970–71 season by scoring 44 points in a win over Fides Napoli (at a time where the Three-point field goal wasn't used). His 540 points overall (over 24 per game) saw him crowned as the Serie A top scorer for the season.

Schull played a further two seasons for Fortitudo Bologna before retiring from basketball in 1973 after struggling with injuries, returning to the U.S. to be closer to his sick mother and work in his father's building company. He ended his Fortitudo career having appeared 104 times for a side continuously flirting with relegation, scoring 2,339 points (over 22 per game) and leading the rebounding tables twice in addition to his top-scoring crown. This included 201 points against Virtus, who he beat six times out of nine as he helped establish a fierce rivalry between the two sides.

An avowed Fortitudo supporter, Schull followed the team results from the U.S. and kept in touch with team officials, he even attended the celebrations of Fortitudo's 1999–2000 league title in Bologna. In parallel he is still held in high esteem by the club and its fans, with later players and fans still referring to him as a club legend. In honor of his legacy, the club posthumously retired his number 13 jersey in 2010.

== Personal ==
Schull was nicknamed Baron (Italian: Barone) by fans and the press as he often whistled the tune of Snoopy vs. the Red Baron. He was himself an occasional singer and guitar player, recording a single inspired by his life, "La Storia Di Gary", released in 1972 by Spark records.

A diabetic, he kept his condition secret from Fortitudo officials until he was found passed out next to syringes and had to disclose they were for insulin injections (his coach had thought he was taking drugs).

=== Death ===
Schull died on 9 February 2005 at the age of 60 after suffering a heart attack in his home in Melbourne, Florida. He had lived there for decades, inheriting the building company his father had created which he ran with his wife until his death.
