= 2011–12 Florida State Seminoles men's basketball team =

American college basketball season

2011–12 Florida State Seminoles men's basketball

ACC Tournament Champions

NCAA tournament, Round of 32
- Conference: Atlantic Coast Conference

Ranking
- Coaches: No. 15
- AP: No. 10
- Record: 25–10 (12–4 ACC)
- Head coach: Leonard Hamilton (10th year)
- Assistant coaches: Stan Jones; Dennis Gates; Corey Williams
- Home arena: Donald L. Tucker Center (Capacity: 12,100)

2011–12 ACC men's basketball standings
	Conf.				Overall
Team	W		L	PCT	W		L	PCT
No. 6 North Carolina	14	–	2	.875	32	–	6	.842
No. 14 Duke	13	–	3	.813	27	–	7	.794
No. 15 Florida State†	12	–	4	.750	25	–	10	.714
Virginia	9	–	7	.563	22	–	10	.688
No. 20 NC State	9	–	7	.563	24	–	13	.649
Miami (FL)	9	–	7	.563	20	–	13	.606
Clemson	8	–	8	.500	16	–	15	.516
Maryland	6	–	10	.375	17	–	15	.531
Virginia Tech	4	–	12	.250	16	–	17	.485
Wake Forest	4	–	12	.250	13	–	18	.419
Georgia Tech	4	–	12	.250	11	–	20	.355
Boston College	4	–	12	.250	9	–	22	.290
† 2012 ACC tournament winner As of April 3, 2012; Rankings from Coaches Poll

The 2011–12 Florida State Seminoles men's basketball team represented Florida State University in the 2011–12 NCAA Division I men's basketball season. The Seminoles, led by 10th year head coach Leonard Hamilton, played their home games at the Donald L. Tucker Center and were members of the Atlantic Coast Conference.

In addition to defeating traditional ACC powers North Carolina and Duke in both the regular season and the ACC Tournament, the Seminoles won their first ACC championship in program history.

The Seminoles received an automatic bid to the 2012 NCAA Division I men's basketball tournament where they defeated St. Bonaventure in the first round before falling to Cincinnati in the second round.

== Previous season ==
The Seminoles finished the 2010–11 season 23–11, 11–5 in ACC play and lost in the Sweet Sixteen round of the NCAA tournament to VCU.

== Roster ==
Number	Name	Position	Height	Weight	Year	Hometown
1	Xavier Gibson	Forward/Center	6–11	248	Senior	Dothan, Alabama
3	Luke Loucks	Guard	6–5	201	Senior	Clearwater, Florida
4	Deividas Dulkys	Guard	6–5	196	Senior	Šilutė, Lithuania
5	Bernard James	Forward	6–10	240	Senior	Savannah, Georgia
10	Okaro White	Forward	6–8	204	Sophomore	Clearwater, Florida
11	Kiel Turpin	Center	6–11	225	Junior	Normal, Illinois
12	Jeff Peterson	Guard	6–1	195	Senior	Springfield, Missouri
15	Terrance Shannon	Forward	6–8	240	Junior	Forsyth, Georgia
20	Rafael Portuondo	Guard	5–11	165	Junior	Miami, Florida
21	Michael Snaer	Guard	6–5	202	Junior	Moreno Valley, California
24	Antwan Space	Forward	6–8	218	Freshman	Desoto, Texas
30	Ian Miller	Guard	6–3	186	Sophomore	Charlotte, North Carolina
31	Terry Whisnant II	Guard	6–3	185	Freshman	Cherryville, North Carolina
33	Joey Moreau	Guard	6–2	179	Junior	Orlando, Florida
50	Jon Kreft	Forward/Center	7–0	260	Senior	Coral Springs, Florida

== Schedule ==
Date time, TV	Rank^{#}	Opponent^{#}	Result	Record	Site (attendance) city, state
Exhibition
October 31*; 7:00 p.m.		Indiana (PA)	W 80–51	0–0	Donald L. Tucker Center; Tallahassee, FL
November 7*; 7:00 p.m.		Georgia Southwestern	W 86–41	0–0	Donald L. Tucker Center; Tallahassee, FL
Non-conference regular season
November 11*; 7:00 p.m., ESPN3		Jacksonville	W 79–67	1–0	Donald L. Tucker Center (7,822); Tallahassee, FL
November 14*; 7:00 p.m., ESPN3	No. 25	UCF	W 73–50	2–0	Donald L. Tucker Center (7,655); Tallahassee, FL
November 16*; 7:00 p.m., ESPN3	No. 25	Stetson	W 79–66	3–0	Donald L. Tucker Center (6,424); Tallahassee, FL
November 20*; 3:00 p.m., ESPN3	No. 25	South Alabama	W 80–39	4–0	Donald L. Tucker Center (6,641); Tallahassee, FL
November 24*; 4:30 p.m., Versus	No. 22	vs. Massachusetts; Battle 4 Atlantis quarterfinal	W 73–53	5–0	Imperial Arena (1,493); Paradise Island, Bahamas
November 25*; 4:30 p.m., Versus	No. 22	vs. Harvard; Battle 4 Atlantis semifinal	L 41–46	5–1	Imperial Arena (2,394); Paradise Island, Bahamas
November 26*; 2:00 p.m., Versus	No. 22	vs. No. 4 Connecticut; Battle 4 Atlantis consolation	L 76–78 ^{OT}	5–2	Imperial Arena (2,000); Paradise Island, Bahamas
November 30*; 7:30 p.m., ESPN		at Michigan State; ACC – Big Ten Challenge	L 49–65	5–3	Breslin Student Events Center (14,797); East Lansing, MI
December 5*; 7:00 p.m., ESPNU		Charleston Southern	W 76–51	6–3	Donald L. Tucker Center (6,316); Tallahassee, FL
December 11*; 1:00 p.m., ESPN3		UNC Greensboro	W 75–60	7–3	Donald L. Tucker Center (5,250); Tallahassee, FL
December 18*; 3:00 p.m., ESPNU		Loyola Marymount	W 77–61	8–3	Donald L. Tucker Center (5,642); Tallahassee, FL
December 22*; 7:00 p.m., ESPNU		at No. 11 Florida; Rivalry	L 64–82	8–4	O'Connell Center (11,125); Gainesville, FL
December 30*; 7:00 p.m., ESPN3		Princeton	L 73–75 ^{3OT}	8–5	Donald L. Tucker Center (6,670); Tallahassee, FL
January 4*; 7:00 p.m., ESPN3		Auburn	W 85–56	9–5	Donald L. Tucker Center (7,967); Tallahassee, FL
ACC regular season
January 7; 4:00 p.m., ESPN2		at Clemson	L 59–79	9–6 (0–1)	Littlejohn Coliseum (8,026); Clemson, SC
January 10; 7:00 p.m., ESPNU		at Virginia Tech	W 63–59	10–6 (1–1)	Cassell Coliseum (7,256); Blacksburg, VA
January 14; 2:00 p.m., ESPN		No. 3 North Carolina; ESPN College GameDay	W 90–57	11–6 (2–1)	Donald L. Tucker Center (12,100); Tallahassee, FL
January 17; 9:00 p.m., ESPNU		Maryland	W 84–70	12–6 (3–1)	Donald L. Tucker Center (8,853); Tallahassee, FL
January 21; 4:00 p.m., ESPN		at No. 4 Duke	W 76–73	13–6 (4–1)	Cameron Indoor Stadium (9,314); Durham, NC
January 25; 7:00 p.m., RSN	No. 23	at Wake Forest	W 75–52	14–6 (5–1)	LJVM Coliseum (9,147); Winston-Salem, NC
February 1; 7:00 p.m., RSN	No. 21	Georgia Tech	W 68–54	15–6 (6–1)	Donald L. Tucker Center (9,756); Tallahassee, FL
February 4; 1:00 p.m., ACCN	No. 21	No. 16 Virginia	W 58–55	16–6 (7–1)	Donald L. Tucker Center (11,757); Tallahassee, FL
February 8; 7:00 p.m., ESPN3	No. 15	at Boston College	L 60–64	16–7 (7–2)	Conte Forum (4,074); Chestnut Hill, MA
February 11; 1:00 p.m., ACCN	No. 15	Miami (FL)	W 64–59	17–7 (8–2)	Donald L. Tucker Center (11,971); Tallahassee, FL
February 16; 7:00 p.m., ESPN2	No. 20	Virginia Tech	W 48–47	18–7 (9–2)	Donald L. Tucker Center (10,123); Tallahassee, FL
February 18; 1:00 p.m., ACCN	No. 20	at NC State	W 76–62	19–7 (10–2)	RBC Center (17,547); Raleigh, NC
February 23; 7:00 p.m., ESPN	No. 15	No. 5 Duke	L 66–74	19–8 (10–3)	Donald L. Tucker Center (12,100); Tallahassee, FL
February 26; 6:00 p.m., ESPNU	No. 15	at Miami (FL)	L 62–78	19–9 (10–4)	BankUnited Center (7,261); Coral Gables, FL
March 1; 6:00 p.m., ESPN2	No. 22	at No. 24 Virginia	W 63–60	20–9 (11–4)	John Paul Jones Arena (11,807); Charlottesville, VA
March 4; 12:00 p.m., ESPN2	No. 22	Clemson	W 80–72	21–9 (12–4)	Donald L. Tucker Center (11,500); Tallahassee, FL
ACC Tournament
March 9; 9:00 p.m., ESPN2/ACCN	(3) No. 17	vs. (6) Miami; Quarterfinals	W 82–71	22–9	Philips Arena (19,520); Atlanta, GA
March 10; 3:00 p.m., ESPN/ACCN	(3) No. 17	vs. (2) No. 5 Duke; Semifinals	W 62–59	23–9	Philips Arena (19,520); Atlanta, GA
March 11; 1:00 p.m., ESPN/ACCN	(3) No. 17	vs. (1) No. 4 North Carolina; Championship	W 85–82	24–9	Philips Arena (19,520); Atlanta, GA
NCAA Tournament
March 16*; 2:45 p.m., CBS	(3 E) No. 10	vs. (14 E) St. Bonaventure; Second round	W 66–63	25–9	Bridgestone Arena (11,751); Nashville, TN
March 18*; 9:40 p.m., TBS	(3 E) No. 10	vs. (6 E) Cincinnati; Third round	L 56–62	25–10	Bridgestone Arena (11,033); Nashville, TN
*Non-conference game. ^{#}Rankings from AP poll. (#) Tournament seedings in parentheses. All times are in Eastern Time..

== NBA draft ==
Round	Pick	Overall	Name	Team
2nd	1	33	Bernard James	Dallas Mavericks
