= Hugh Durham =

American basketball coach (born 1937)

Biographical details
- Born: October 26, 1937 (age 89); Louisville, Kentucky, U.S.

Playing career
- 1956–1959: Florida State
- Position: Point guard / shooting guard

Coaching career (HC unless noted)
- 1959–1966: Florida State (asst.)
- 1966–1978: Florida State
- 1978–1995: Georgia
- 1997–2005: Jacksonville

Head coaching record
- Overall: 634–430
- Tournaments: 8–8 (NCAA Division I); 6–7 (NIT)

Accomplishments and honors

Championships
- 2 NCAA Regional – Final Four (1972, 1983); Metro regular season (1978); SEC tournament (1983); SEC regular season (1990)

Awards
- Metro Coach of the Year (1978); 3× SEC Coach of the Year (1985, 1987, 1990); No. 25 jersey honored by Florida State Seminoles
- College Basketball Hall of Fame; Inducted in 2016

Hugh Nelson Durham (born October 26, 1937) is an American retired college basketball coach. He was head coach at Florida State, Georgia, and Jacksonville. He is the only head coach to have led two different programs to their first Final Four appearances.

== Early life ==
A native of Louisville, Kentucky, Durham was a highly recruited three-sport star at Eastern High School, where his teammate was the actor Ned Beatty. He was an all-state quarterback and all-region in basketball. He chose to play basketball in college and accepted a scholarship offer from Florida State University.

== College career ==
At Florida State University, Durham is one of the most prolific scorers in Seminole basketball history. He appears prominently in the Florida State record book as both a player and head coach. Durham was a guard for FSU head coach Bud Kennedy.

Over fifty years after his FSU career ended, Durham's career average of 18.9 points per game is still the ninth best in school history. His 21.9 points per game in 1958–59 remains the seventh best single season average in FSU history. On January 19, 1957, Durham scored 43 points against Stetson University. It is still the second-best single game scoring mark in school history. For his three-year varsity career, Durham scored 1,381 points. Durham played prior to college basketball adopting the three-point shot.

In 1999 Florida State renamed its Most Valuable Player award the "Hugh Durham Most Valuable Player" award in his honor.

In 1959, Durham graduated from Florida State with a B.A. in business administration. He was a member of the Phi Delta Theta fraternity. In 1961, he earned an M.B.A. from Florida State.

== Coaching career ==
=== Florida State Seminoles ===
After Durham received his bachelor's degree from Florida State in 1959, FSU head coach Bud Kennedy hired him as an assistant coach. Durham served as Kennedy's assistant for seven seasons.

Prior to the 1966–67 season, Kennedy was diagnosed with stomach cancer and died shortly thereafter. Durham was elevated to head coach at Florida State at the age of 29. He is one of the youngest head coaches in NCAA Division I basketball history.

Durham was head coach at his alma mater for 12 seasons, is the school's all-time most successful coach, led the Seminoles to the 1972 NCAA Championship game and three NCAA Tournaments.

In the 1966–67 season, Durham recruited and coached the first African-American basketball player in Florida State sports history. As an assistant coach, Durham recruited Lenny Hall. Hall was a native of Camden, NJ, who was playing for St. Petersburg Junior College. Both Bud Kennedy and Durham signed Hall. However, Kennedy died of cancer before Hall played his first game at FSU. As a 29-year-old first-year head coach, Durham was the subject of intense criticism. Five seasons later, Durham would take a team with five African-American starters to the NCAA Championship game. There would only be one white player on the 13-man Seminole roster, John Amick, who played in 11 games and sported a lengthy ponytail.

In the 1967–68 season, only his second as head coach at FSU, Durham led the Seminoles to only their second NCAA Tournament in school history. FSU received an NCAA Tournament at-large bid as an Independent at a time when only 25 teams were invited to play in the NCAA tournament. Dave Cowens was a sophomore and the catalyst of the 1968 team. Cowens had been a part of Durham's first recruiting class as the head coach at FSU that had also included Lenny Hall.

In 1972, Durham led Florida State to the greatest basketball season in school history. The team went 27–6 and earned another at-large berth to the NCAA tournament. The Seminoles shocked the basketball world by advancing to the NCAA Championship game.

To reach the 1972 NCAA Championship game, Florida State played in the NCAA Mideast Region in Dayton, OH. Durham's talented, defensive-oriented but underrated squad was led by Ron King, Reggie Royals, Rowland Garrett and diminutive point guard Otto Petty.

In the Mideast Region Semifinals, the Seminoles defeated Big Ten champion University of Minnesota, 70–56. In the Mideast Region Finals, Florida State defeated the University of Kentucky, 73–54. Kentucky was the SEC champion. The game was head coach Adolph Rupp's last game at Kentucky, where he won four NCAA titles.

The 1972 NCAA Final Four was held in Los Angeles, California. In the NCAA Semifinals, FSU upset the heavily favored University of North Carolina Tar Heels, 79–75. The Tar Heels, coached by Dean Smith and led by future NBA stars Bob McAdoo and Bobby Jones were the Atlantic Coast Conference Champions.

In the NCAA Championship game, FSU lost to UCLA, 81–76. The Bruins were led by future NBA stars Bill Walton and Henry Bibby. It was UCLA's closest championship game during UCLA's stretch of 10 NCAA championships under head coach John Wooden.

Florida State was not a member of a conference for the first ten seasons Durham was head coach in Tallahassee. In 1976–77, Florida State joined the Metro Conference.

In 1977–78, only their second in the Metro, Durham led the Seminoles to the Conference title. As a result, FSU was one of 32 teams to earn a 1978 NCAA Tournament bid. It was Florida State's third trip the NCAA tournament under Durham. Durham was also named Metro Conference Coach of the Year.

After the 1977–78 season, Durham was lured away from FSU to become the head coach at the University of Georgia. His overall record at FSU was 230–95 (.708). Over thirty years later, his .708 winning percentage is still the highest in Florida State history.

Durham remains the only coach to ever lead Florida State to the NCAA final Four.

=== Georgia Bulldogs ===
Prior to the 1978–79 season, Durham was named head coach at the University of Georgia.

Before Durham arrived in Athens, Georgia had never been to either the NCAA or NIT Tournaments, never won an SEC regular season title and never won an SEC Tournament championship.

Durham immediately embarked on a transformation project to produce a new era of Georgia basketball.

Durham's efforts produced virtual overnight success as from 1981 to 1991, he led Georgia to five NCAA Tournaments, four NIT Tournaments, the 1983 NCAA Final Four, the 1982 NIT Final Four, the 1983 SEC tournament championship and the 1990 SEC Championship. In that same span, Durham was named SEC Coach of the Year four times.

In 1980–81, only his third season at Georgia, Durham was voted his first of four SEC Coach of the Year awards. That season, Durham led Georgia to the school's first ever post-season tournament as the Bulldogs received an NIT bid. UGA also reached the 1981 SEC tournament championship Game behind the electric play of Dominique Wilkins, Terry Fair, Vern Fleming and James Banks.

In 1981–82, the Bulldogs advanced to the NIT Final Four by defeating Temple, Maryland and Virginia Tech. The Bulldogs lost to Purdue, 61–60, in the NIT Semifinals at Madison Square Garden in New York. Again, Wilkins, Fair, Fleming, and Banks led the Bulldogs.

After the 1981–82 season, All-American and future National Collegiate Basketball Hall of Fame inductee and Naismith Hall of Fame inductee, Dominique Wilkins, entered the NBA draft after his junior year at UGA.

As a result, not much was expected of the 1982–83 Georgia basketball team and the Bulldogs were picked to finish near the bottom of the SEC going into the season.

The Bulldogs won the 1983 SEC Tournament championship, the first SEC basketball championship in school history.

As a result of the title, Georgia earned its first NCAA Tournament bid in school history on the way to a 24–10 record.

In the 48 team NCAA field, the Bulldogs were seeded fourth in the NCAA East Region.

Durham again shocked the basketball world by leading the Bulldogs to the 1983 NCAA Final Four. Georgia became one of the few teams since the NCAA tournament began in 1939 to reach the NCAA Final Four in its first ever NCAA Tournament appearance.

Georgia beat VCU by two points in its first game in Greensboro to advance to the NCAA East Region in Syracuse, NY. This Georgia squad was another of Durham's patented formula of talent, intensity and defensive focus. As with his 1972 FSU team, Durham's squad was given little chance in the Tournament. The starters were Vern Fleming, Terry Fair, James Banks, Lamar Heard and Gerald Crosby with Richard Corhen, Donald Hartry, Derrick Floyd and Horace McMillan coming off the bench.

In the East Region Semifinals, Georgia upset the Big East Champion and #3 ranked St. John's University, 70–67. The Redmen were coached by Lou Carnesecca and led by Chris Mullin and Bill Wennington. The Redmen had been #1 seed in the East Region and were dubbed 'The Beast of the East.

In the East Region Finals, the Bulldogs upset defending NCAA champion North Carolina, 82–77. UNC was led by Michael Jordan, Sam Perkins and Brad Daugherty. UNC was coached by Dean Smith. UGA front line was 6–7, 6–6, and 6–5. UNC's front line was 7–0, 6–11, and 6–8. With just over 90 second left in the game, Georgia led by 15 points and the Tar Heel Radio Network crew had to cancel the reservations to the Final Four in Albuquerque it had made prior to the start of the game against Georgia.

The 1983 NCAA Final Four was in Albuquerque, NM. The Bulldogs lost in the NCAA Semifinals to eventual champion North Carolina State, 67–60. The ACC Champion Wolfpack was coached by the late Jim Valvano and led by Derrick Wittenberg, Sidney Lowe, Thurl Bailey, and Lorenzo Charles. Georgia's 6-7 center Terry Fair suffered a knee injury at Friday's practice and was severely limited against NC State's 6–11, 6–10, 6-7 front line. Fair, a senior and former McDonald's All-American in high school, had scored 27 points in Georgia' NCAA regional semifinal win against St. John's.

In 1984–85, the Bulldogs returned to the NCAA tournament finishing the season with a 22–9 record. In another milestone for Durham, Georgia defeated Kentucky in Lexington, 79–77. It was the first win for Georgia over Kentucky in Lexington since 1923. The Bulldogs were led by Joe Ward, Cedric Henderson, Gerald Crosby, Donald Hartry, Horace McMillan, and Richard Corhen.

In 1985–86, Durham was again named SEC Coach of the Year. In 1986–87, Durham was voted SEC Coach of the Year for the second consecutive year as Georgia earned its third NCAA Tournament bid in five seasons behind the play of Willie Anderson, Chad Kessler, Derrick Kirce, Eric Burdette, Dennis Williams, and Patrick Hamilton.

In 1989–90, Durham led Georgia to the school's first ever SEC regular season Championship and another trip to the NCAA tournament. Georgia outlasted LSU and Shaquille O'Neal to clinch the SEC title in a game in Athens that was nationally televised. A free throw by Neville Austin with five seconds left in overtime gave Georgia the 85–84 win. Alec Kessler scored 30 points. Durham was voted SEC Coach of the Year for the fourth time in ten seasons. The 20–9 Bulldogs were led by the late Alec Kessler, Litterial Green, Marshall Wilson, Antonio Harvey, and Neville Austin.

In 1990–91, Georgia advanced to the NCAA tournament for the fifth time in nine seasons behind the play of Litterial Green, Rod Cole, Jody Patton, Marshall Wilson, Antonio Harvey, and Neville Austin. In 1994–95, Durham finished his career at Georgia by leading the Bulldogs to their 12th post-season tournament appearance in his 17 seasons as head coach. He is the most successful coach in Georgia history with a record of 297–215.

Durham remains the only coach to ever lead Georgia to the NCAA Final Four.

=== Jacksonville Dolphins ===
In March 1997, Durham came out of retirement at the age of 59 to try to help rebuild the struggling basketball program at Jacksonville University. He was also signed to be the assistant athletic director. The Dolphins had finished 5–23 the year before his arrival.

Under Durham, the team's results in the Atlantic Sun Conference improved, moving from lower standings to higher positions in the league. The team emphasized defensive play.

Over his last five seasons, Jacksonville won 78 games, averaged 10 conference wins a season, and held opponents to an average of only 69.5 points per game. In that span, Jacksonville was 49–19 at home.

In 2000, Durham was named athletic director in addition to his basketball head coaching duties. He served in the dual roles from 2000 through 2004.

He coached at Jacksonville for eight seasons, retiring in March 2005 with a record of 106–119.

== Recognition ==
Durham was inducted into the Florida State University Hall of Fame in 1980, the Kentucky High School Hall of Fame in 1994, the Florida Sports Hall of Fame in 1999, the Georgia Sports Hall of Fame in 2009, the Kentucky Sports Hall of Fame in 2012, and the National Collegiate Basketball Hall of Fame in 2016.

== Head coaching record ==
Record table
Season	Team	Overall	Conference	Standing	Postseason
Florida State Seminoles (NCAA University Division / Division I Independent) (1966–1976)
1966–67	Florida State	11–15			
1967–68	Florida State	19–8			NCAA University Division First Round
1968–69	Florida State	18–8			
1969–70	Florida State	23–3			
1970–71	Florida State	17–9			
1971–72	Florida State	27–6			NCAA University Division Runner-up
1972–73	Florida State	18–8			
1973–74	Florida State	18–8			
1974–75	Florida State	18–8			
1975–76	Florida State	22–5			
Florida State Seminoles (Metro Conference) (1976–1978)
1976–77	Florida State	16–11	0–2	7th	
1977–78	Florida State	23–6	11–1	1st	NCAA Division I First Round
Florida State:		230–95	11–3		
Georgia Bulldogs (Southeastern Conference) (1978–1995)
1978–79	Georgia	14–14	7–11	7th	
1979–80	Georgia	14–13	7–11	T–6th	
1980–81	Georgia	19–12	9–9	5th	NIT Second Round
1981–82	Georgia	19–12	10–8	6th	NIT Semifinals
1982–83	Georgia	24–10	9–9	T–3rd	NCAA Division I Final Four
1983–84	Georgia	17–13	8–10	T–7th	NIT First Round
1984–85	Georgia	22–9	12–6	2nd	NCAA Division I Second Round
1985–86	Georgia	17–13	9–9	T–5th	NIT Second Round
1986–87	Georgia	18–12	10–8	T–3rd	NCAA Division I First Round
1987–88	Georgia	20–16	8–10	7th	NIT Second Round
1988–89	Georgia	15–16	6–12	9th	
1989–90	Georgia	20–9	13–5	1st	NCAA Division I First Round
1990–91	Georgia	17–13	9–9	6th	NCAA Division I First Round
1991–92	Georgia	15–14	7–9	4th (East)	
1992–93	Georgia	15–14	8–8	4th (East)	NIT First Round
1993–94	Georgia	14–16	7–9	4th (East)	
1994–95	Georgia	18–10	9–7	2nd (East)	NIT First Round
Georgia:		298–216	148–150		
Jacksonville Dolphins (Sun Belt Conference) (1997–1998)
1997–98	Jacksonville	8–19	6–12	T–9th	
Jacksonville Dolphins (Trans America Athletic / Atlantic Sun Conference) (1998–2005)
1998–99	Jacksonville	12–15	7–9	6th	
1999–00	Jacksonville	8–19	5–13	9th	
2000–01	Jacksonville	18–10	11–7	T–3rd	
2001–02	Jacksonville	18–12	12–6	T–4th	
2002–03	Jacksonville	13–16	8–8	4th (South)	
2003–04	Jacksonville	13–15	8–12	7th	
2004–05	Jacksonville	16–13	11–9	4th	
Jacksonville:		106–119	68–76		
Total:		634–430			
National champion Postseason invitational champion Conference regular season champion Conference regular season and conference tournament champion Division regular season champion Division regular season and conference tournament champion Conference tournament champion

== See also ==
- List of college men's basketball coaches with 600 wins
- List of NCAA Division I men's basketball tournament Final Four appearances by coach
