= Tony Jackson (basketball, born 1958) =

American basketball player

Personal information
- Born: January 17, 1958 (age 68) Lexington, Kentucky, U.S.
- Listed height: 6 ft 0 in (1.83 m)
- Listed weight: 170 lb (77 kg)

Career information
- High school: Bryan Station (Lexington, Kentucky)
- College: Florida State (1976–1980)
- NBA draft: 1980: 4th round, 87th overall pick
- Drafted by: Los Angeles Lakers
- Position: Point guard
- Number: 23

Career history
- 1980: Los Angeles Lakers
- 1980–1981: Anchorage Northern Knights
- Stats at NBA.com
- Stats at Basketball Reference

Anthony Eugene Jackson (born January 17, 1958) is an American former professional basketball player. He played in two games for the NBA's Los Angeles Lakers in the beginning of the 1980–81 season after being selected by them in the 1980 NBA draft. He scored two total points in his career.

Jackson played for the Anchorage Northern Knights of the Continental Basketball Association during the 1980–81 season.

== Career statistics ==
Legend
GP	Games played	GS	Games started	MPG	Minutes per game
FG%	Field goal percentage	3P%	3-point field goal percentage	FT%	Free throw percentage
RPG	Rebounds per game	APG	Assists per game	SPG	Steals per game
BPG	Blocks per game	PPG	Points per game	**Bold**	Career high

=== NBA ===
==== Regular season ====
Year	Team	GP	MPG	FG%	3P%	FT%	RPG	APG	SPG	BPG	PPG
1980–81	L.A. Lakers	2	7.0	.333	–	–	1.0	1.0	1.0	.0	1.0
