= James Collins (basketball) =

American basketball player (born 1973)

Personal information
- Born: November 5, 1973 (age 53) Jacksonville, Florida, U.S.
- Listed height: 6 ft 4 in (1.93 m)
- Listed weight: 196 lb (89 kg)

Career information
- High school: Andrew Jackson (Jacksonville, Florida)
- College: Florida State (1993–1997)
- NBA draft: 1997: 2nd round, 36th overall pick
- Drafted by: Philadelphia 76ers
- Playing career: 1997–2007
- Position: Shooting guard
- Number: 32, 4

Career history
- 1997–1998: Los Angeles Clippers
- 1998: Jacksonville Barracudas
- 1998–1999: La Crosse Bobcats
- 1999: Quad City Thunder
- 1999: Strasbourg IG
- 2000: Joventut Badalona
- 2000–2002: Grand Rapids Hoops
- 2002: Guaiqueríes de Margarita
- 2002–2003: Air Avellino
- 2003–2004: Eurorida Scafati
- 2004–2005: Cimberio Novara
- 2006: Vertical Vision Cantù
- 2006–2007: Indesit Fabriano

Career highlights
- All-CBA First Team (2002); Second-team All-ACC (1997); 2× Third-team All-ACC (1995, 1996); Fourth-team Parade All-American (1993); Florida Mr. Basketball (1993)
- Stats at NBA.com
- Stats at Basketball Reference

James Edgar Collins (born November 5, 1973) is an American former professional basketball player whose last team was Indesit Fabriano of the Italian second division (Serie A2) in 2006–07 season.

== Career ==
He attended Florida State University and was selected 36th overall by the Philadelphia 76ers in the 1997 NBA draft. He played one season in the NBA for the Los Angeles Clippers in 1997–98, who had obtained him from the 76ers by trading the rights to a 1998 second round pick (used to select Jelani McCoy). He has also been briefly signed by the Phoenix Suns in 1999, Washington Wizards in 1999 and Memphis Grizzlies in 2001, but has not played any NBA games for those teams. Collins played for the Grand Rapids Hoops of the Continental Basketball Association (CBA) from 2000 to 2002 and earned All-CBA First Team honors in 2002.

Before Fabriano, he has played in Spain for Pinturas Bruguer and Italy in Serie A for Air Avellino (2002–2003) and Vertical Vision Cantù (2006) and Serie A2 for Eurorida Scafati (2003–2004) and Cimberio Novara (2004–2006).

Collins, currently is the Head Boys Basketball Coach at Oakleaf High School in Orange Park, Florida.
