= Dave Fedor =

American basketball player

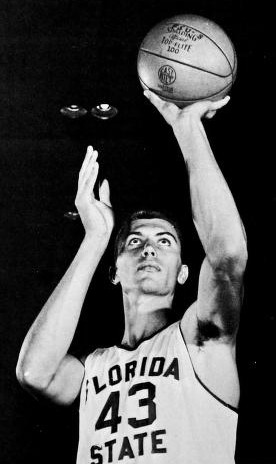
- Fedor in 1961

Personal information
- Born: December 10, 1940 (age 85)
- Listed height: 6 ft 6 in (1.98 m)
- Listed weight: 190 lb (86 kg)

Career information
- High school: Zephyrhills (Zephyrhills, Florida)
- College: Florida State (1959–1962)
- NBA draft: 1962: 3rd round, 23rd overall pick
- Drafted by: San Francisco Warriors
- Position: Forward
- Number: 17

Career history
- 1962–1963: San Francisco Warriors

Career highlights
- No. 43 jersey honored by Florida State Seminoles
- Stats at NBA.com
- Stats at Basketball Reference

Samuel David Fedor (born December 10, 1940) is an American former professional basketball player who spent one season in the National Basketball Association (NBA) as a member of the San Francisco Warriors. He attended Florida State University where his play on the school's basketball team earned him the honor of having his number retired. He was drafted by the Warriors during the third round of the 1962 NBA draft.

== Career statistics ==
Legend
GP	Games played	GS	Games started	MPG	Minutes per game
FG%	Field goal percentage	3P%	3-point field goal percentage	FT%	Free throw percentage
RPG	Rebounds per game	APG	Assists per game	SPG	Steals per game
BPG	Blocks per game	PPG	Points per game	**Bold**	Career high

=== NBA ===
==== Regular season ====
Year	Team	GP	MPG	FG%	FT%	RPG	APG	PPG
1962–63	San Francisco	7	3.9	.300	.000	.9	.1	.9
