= Mickey Dillard =

American basketball player (born 1958)

Personal information
- Born: October 15, 1958 (age 68) Hollywood, Florida, U.S.
- Listed height: 6 ft 3 in (1.91 m)
- Listed weight: 170 lb (77 kg)

Career information
- High school: Nova (Davie, Florida)
- College: Florida State (1977–1981)
- NBA draft: 1981: 3rd round, 55th overall pick
- Drafted by: Cleveland Cavaliers
- Playing career: 1981–1982
- Position: Point guard
- Number: 9

Career history
- 1981–1982: Cleveland Cavaliers

Career highlights
- First team All-Metro Conference (1980)
- Stats at NBA.com
- Stats at Basketball Reference

Mickey Anthony Dillard (born October 15, 1958) is an American former NBA player born in Hollywood, Florida.

After being selected by the Cleveland Cavaliers in the 1981 NBA draft, Dillard played in 33 games for the team in the 1981–82 NBA season.

== Career statistics ==
Legend
GP	Games played	GS	Games started	MPG	Minutes per game
FG%	Field goal percentage	3P%	3-point field goal percentage	FT%	Free throw percentage
RPG	Rebounds per game	APG	Assists per game	SPG	Steals per game
BPG	Blocks per game	PPG	Points per game	**Bold**	Career high

=== NBA ===
==== Regular season ====
Year	Team	GP	GS	MPG	FG%	3P%	FT%	RPG	APG	SPG	BPG	PPG
1981–82	Cleveland	33	0	6.7	.367	.000	.652	.5	1.0	.2	.1	2.2
