= Tim Pickett =

American basketball player (born 1981)

Personal information
- Born: April 18, 1981 (age 45) Daytona Beach, Florida, U.S.
- Listed height: 6 ft 4 in (1.93 m)
- Listed weight: 198 lb (90 kg)

Career information
- High school: Mainland (Daytona Beach, Florida)
- College: Daytona State (1999–2000); Indian River State (2001–2002); Florida State (2002–2004)
- NBA draft: 2004: 2nd round, 44th overall pick
- Drafted by: New Orleans Hornets
- Playing career: 2004–2020
- Position: Small forward

Career history
- 2004–2005: Florida Flame
- 2005–2006: ASVEL Lyon-Villeurbanne
- 2006–2007: Rimini Crabs
- 2007–2008: Andrea Costa Imola
- 2008: Lukoil Academic
- 2009: Shanxi Zhongyu
- 2009: ASU Sports Club
- 2009–2010: Shaanxi Kylins
- 2010: Capitanes de Arecibo
- 2010–2011: Ironi Ashkelon
- 2011: Jilin Northeast Tigers
- 2011: Guaiqueríes de Margarita
- 2011: Meralco Bolts
- 2012: Xinjiang Flying Tigers
- 2013: Guaiqueríes de Margarita
- 2013: Hacettepe Üniversitesi
- 2013: La Unión Formosa
- 2015: Gigantes del Estado de México
- 2015: Bucaneros de La Guaira
- 2015–2016: Gigantes del Estado de México
- 2016: Frayles de Guasave
- 2019: Soles de Ojinaga
- 2020: Caballeros de Culiacán

Career highlights
- First-team All-ACC (2004); Second-team All-ACC (2003)
- Stats at Basketball Reference

Timothy Lenard Pickett (born April 18, 1981) is an American former professional basketball player. He played collegiately at Florida State University, and was drafted in the 2nd round of the 2004 NBA draft by the New Orleans Hornets.

== Career ==
In February 2006 he signed for Coopsette Rimini in the Italian second league, LegADue. After five games he was suspended for doping (cannabis), but in September 2006 returned to Rimini after the disqualification.

For the 2007/08 season, he was signed with LegADue team Andrea Costa Imola.

Following that Pickett has also played for PBC Lukoil Academic from Bulgaria, Shaanxi Gaitianli Kylins from China and Capitanes de Arecibo from Puerto Rico.

On September 14, 2010, Pickett signed with Ironi Ashkelon from Israel.

In July 2011, he was signed by the Meralco Bolts. However, he was only able to play a couple of games because of an injury at the 2nd quarter of their game against Talk 'N Text.

On January 6, 2012, Picket signed with the Xinjiang Guanghui Flying Tigers of the Chinese Basketball Association, replacing Patrick Mills on the roster. He scored 35 points in his first game with Xinjiang.

He has signed with the Hacettepe Üniversitesi B.K. of the Turkish Basketball Association for 2013–2014 season. He scored 11 points(3/9 FG, 1/5 3PT, 2/2 FT) in his first game with Hacettepe. However, he was released by Hacettepe after the first game.

== Personal life ==
Pickett was also named honorary president of his fan club, "Pickett's Posse", while playing at Florida State University.
