= Michael Snaer =

American professional basketball player (born 1990)

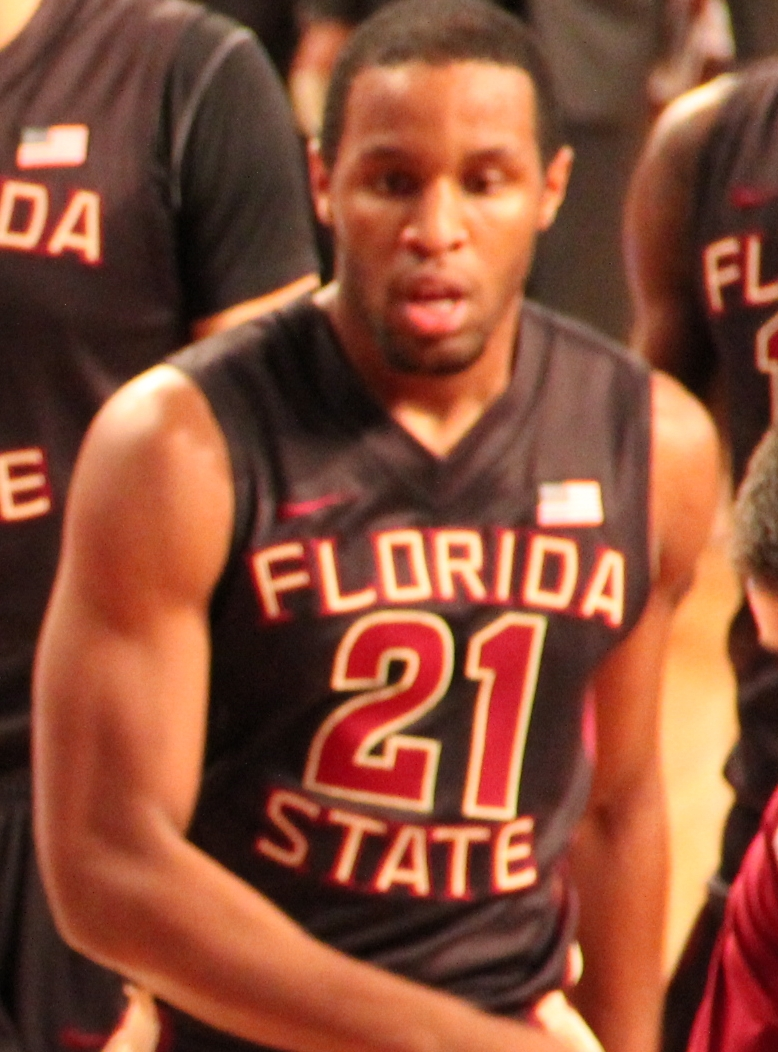
- Snaer in 2013

Personal information
- Born: June 21, 1990 (age 36)
- Listed height: 6 ft 5 in (1.96 m)
- Listed weight: 200 lb (91 kg)

Career information
- High school: Rancho Verde (Moreno Valley, California)
- College: Florida State (2009–2013)
- NBA draft: 2013: undrafted
- Playing career: 2013–2016
- Position: Shooting guard

Career history
- 2013–2014: Enel Brindisi
- 2014: Ural Yekaterinburg
- 2016: Karpoš Sokoli

Career highlights
- Second-team All-ACC (2012); Third-team All-ACC (2013); ACC All-Defensive team (2012); ACC tournament MVP (2012); ACC All-Freshman team (2010); McDonald's All-American (2009)
- Stats at Basketball Reference

Michael Snaer (born June 21, 1990) is an American former professional basketball player who last played for Karpoš Sokoli in Macedonia. As a college player, he led Florida State University to their first ACC tournament championship in 2012, earning Most Valuable Player honors.

== High school career ==
Snaer, a 6'5" shooting guard from Moreno Valley, California, attended Rancho Verde High School. As a senior, he averaged 28.1 points, 10.8 rebounds, 5.2 assists, 3.6 steals and 2.2 blocks per game. He was named a McDonald's All-American and named Gatorade player of the year for California.

Considered a five-star recruit by Rivals.com, Snaer was listed as the No. 2 shooting guard and the No. 7 player in the nation in 2009. He chose to attend Florida State over offers from UCLA, Missouri, Marquette and Kansas.

== College career ==
As a freshman, Snaer averaged 8.8 points per game, third on the team and made the conference All-Freshman team. In his sophomore season, Snaer moved into the starting lineup full-time. He again averaged 8.8 points per game and helped lead the Seminoles to the 2011 NCAA tournament, where the team made their first Sweet 16 since 1993.

In his junior season, Snaer emerged as one of the top players in the Atlantic Coast Conference. He averaged 14.0 points per game (to lead the team) and led the Seminoles to their first ACC tournament championship. He also unofficially led the country in buzzer beaters as he hit three pointers to clinch victories over Duke and Virginia Tech during the season. Snaer averaged 18 points per game in the 2012 ACC tournament and was named tournament MVP. For the regular season, Snaer was named second team All-ACC and was chosen as a member of the conference All-Defensive team. In the NCAA tournament, Snaer struggled and was held scoreless for the first time all season against St. Bonaventure in the first round. The Seminoles lost in the second round to Cincinnati.

Snaer opted to return to Florida State for his senior season, where he was considered a likely candidate for ACC Player of the Year and All-American honors.

=== College statistics ===
Season Averages
Season	Team	G	PTS	REB	AST	STL	BLK	FG%	3P%	FT%	MIN	TO
2009–10	Florida State Seminoles	32	8.8	2.7	1.3	0.5	0.2	.439	.348	.655	23.6	2.5
2010–11	Florida State Seminoles	34	8.8	2.7	2.2	0.9	0.2	.400	.368	.776	28.6	2.7
2011–12	Florida State Seminoles	35	14.0	6.1	3.8	1.1	0.4	.436	.404	.846	30.4	2.1
2012–13	Florida State Seminoles	33	14.8	4.5	2.5	1.0	0.4	.425	.384	.817	32.7	2.8
Totals:		134	11.6	3.0	2.0	0.9	0.4	.425	.382	.782	28.9	2.5

== Professional career ==
Snaer went undrafted in the 2013 NBA draft. Following summer league stints with the Oklahoma City Thunder and Los Angeles Lakers and rejecting an invite to join the Brooklyn Nets camp, Snaer signed with Enel Brindisi of Italy's top league. In 2013, he signed with Russian team Ural Yekaterinburg. On December 2, 2014, he left Ural.

On October 30, 2016, he was acquired by the Los Angeles D-Fenders of the NBA Development League, but was waived on November 10.
