= Reggie Royals =

American basketball player

Personal information
- Born: September 18, 1950 Whiteville, North Carolina, U.S.
- Died: April 16, 2009 (aged 58) Wilmington, North Carolina, U.S.
- Listed height: 6 ft 10 in (2.08 m)
- Listed weight: 200 lb (91 kg)

Career information
- High school: Whiteville (Whiteville, North Carolina)
- College: Florida State (1970–1973)
- NBA draft: 1973: 5th round, 70th overall pick
- Drafted by: Philadelphia 76ers
- Position: Center

Career history
- 1974–1975: San Diego Conquistadors
- Stats at Basketball Reference

Reginald Legrande Royals (September 18, 1950 – April 16, 2009) was an American basketball player who played professionally in the original American Basketball Association (ABA).

Royals, a 6'10" center from Whiteville, North Carolina, played college basketball at Florida State University from 1970 to 1973. In his career, Royals averaged 16.7 points and 12.0 rebounds per game and as a junior led the Seminoles to the program's first Final Four in 1972.

Following the close of his college career, Royals was drafted by both the Philadelphia 76ers of the National Basketball Association (NBA) and the New York Nets of the American Basketball Association (ABA). However, his professional career lasted just two ABA games (and 4 total points) for the San Diego Conquistadors in the 1974–75 season.

Royals died on April 16, 2009, at the Lower Cape Fear Hospice in Wilmington, North Carolina.
