= Ron King (basketball) =

American basketball player

Personal information
- Born: July 11, 1951 (age 75) Louisville, Kentucky, U.S.
- Listed height: 6 ft 4 in (1.93 m)
- Listed weight: 185 lb (84 kg)

Career information
- High school: Central (Louisville, Kentucky)
- College: Florida State (1970–1972)
- NBA draft: 1973: 4th round, 63rd overall pick
- Drafted by: Golden State Warriors
- Position: Shooting guard
- Number: 35

Career history
- 1973–1974: Kentucky Colonels
- 1978: Kentucky Stallions

Career highlights
- No. 33 jersey honored by Florida State Seminoles; Kentucky Mr. Basketball (1969)
- Stats at Basketball Reference

Ron King (born July 11, 1951) is a retired American basketball player. He played for the Kentucky Colonels in the American Basketball Association (ABA).

A 6'4" shooting guard from Louisville, Kentucky, was Kentucky Mr. Basketball as a senior at Central High School. He chose Florida State for college, where, as a junior, he led the Seminoles to the 1972 National Championship game, where they lost to UCLA 81–76. King scored 1,252 points in his college career (19.6 per game) and set the school single-game scoring record with 46 against Georgia Southern on February 11, 1971.

After graduation, King was drafted by the Golden State Warriors in the fourth round (63rd pick overall) of the 1973 NBA draft. He signed instead with the Kentucky Colonels of the ABA, playing one season and averaging 7.1 points per game in the 1973–74 season.
