= Florida State Seminoles men's basketball =

Sports team representing Florida State University

Florida State Seminoles basketball
2026–27 Florida State Seminoles men's basketball team
- University: Florida State University
- First season: 1947–48; 79 years ago
- Head coach: Luke Loucks; 2nd season, 23–16 (.590)
- Location: Tallahassee, Florida
- Arena: Donald L. Tucker Center (capacity: 11,675)
- NCAA division: Division I
- Conference: ACC
- Nickname: Seminoles
- Colors: Garnet and gold
- Student section: The Nole Zone
- All-time record: 1324–951 (.582)
- NCAA tournament record: 23–18 (.561)

NCAA Division I tournament runner-up
- 1972
Other NCAA Division I tournament results
Final Four	1972
Elite Eight	1972, 1993, 2018
Sweet Sixteen	1972, 1992, 1993, 2011, 2018, 2019, 2021
Appearances	1968, 1972, 1978, 1980, 1988, 1989, 1991, 1992, 1993, 1998, 2009, 2010, 2011, 2012, 2017, 2018, 2019, 2021

NIT runner-up
- 1997

Conference tournament champions
- FIC: 1955 Metro: 1991 ACC: 2012

Conference regular-season champions
- Dixie: 1951 FIC: 1955 Metro: 1978, 1989 ACC: 2020

Uniforms
Home	Away
Alternate	Alternate

The Florida State Seminoles men's basketball team represents Florida State University (variously Florida State or FSU) in the intercollegiate sport of basketball. The Seminoles compete in the National Collegiate Athletic Association (NCAA) Division I and the Atlantic Coast Conference (ACC).

Though they have historically played under the shadow of the football program, the Seminoles have had successes on the hardwood. Florida State has made eighteen NCAA tournament appearances: advancing to the Round of 32 on twelve occasions, the Sweet Sixteen on seven occasions, the Elite Eight on three occasions, and the Final Four once, moving on to the championship game and finishing as runner-up. In 2020, despite holding final rankings of #4 in the AP Poll and #5 in the Coaches' Poll, Florida State was declared the 2020 NCAA Division I Men's Basketball Champions by Florida Governor Ron DeSantis and the Florida State Legislature after the 2020 NCAA Tournament was canceled due to the COVID-19 pandemic. This declaration holds no merit with the NCAA, but it is the only claim the basketball program has to a national title. Florida State has also made ten appearances in the National Invitation Tournament.

In the 80 season history of the Seminole basketball program, the Seminoles have won the regular season conference title five times and the conference tournament title four times, including two ACC championships.

Florida State has had 23 All-Americans, 26 players inducted into the Hall of Fame, and 38 players that went on to play in the NBA. Jeff Sagarin and ESPN listed the program 74th in the college basketball all-time rankings in the 'ESPN College Basketball Encyclopedia'.

The Seminoles play their home games in the Donald L. Tucker Civic Center in downtown Tallahassee, Florida campus. The current head men's basketball coach is alumnus Luke Loucks.

== Overview ==
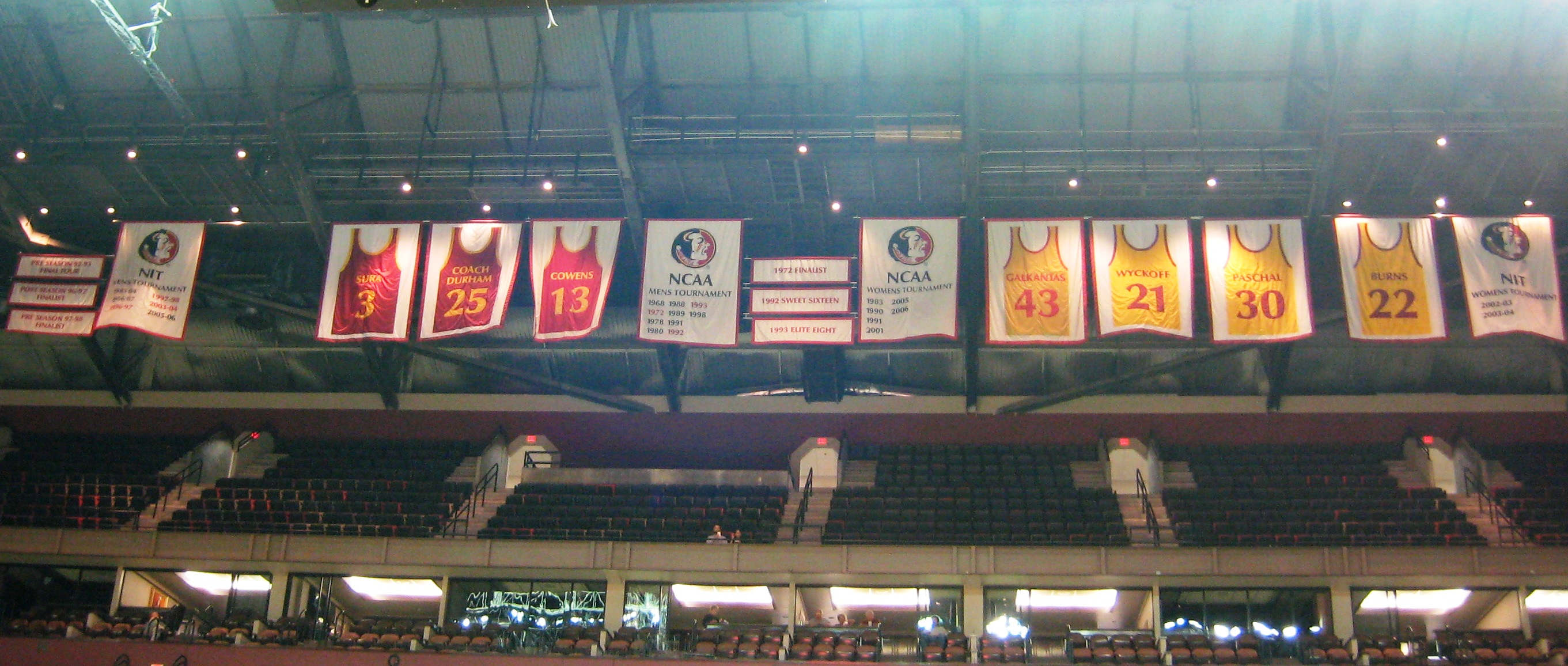
Banners hanging at the Donald L. Tucker Center

The Florida State Seminoles men's team annually plays an eighteen-game conference schedule that is preceded by an out-of-conference schedule against few annual opponents except for Florida. Their conference schedule consists of a home-and-home game against two permanent rivals (Miami and Clemson), alternating home-and-home games against the other seventeen ACC teams.

== History ==
Florida State University has officially fielded a basketball team since 1947.

=== Don Loucks era (1947–1948) ===
Hugh Donald Loucks served as the first basketball coach for the Florida State Seminoles. He coached at the school for one year and compiled an overall record of 5–13, becoming one of only two coaches to leave the program with a losing record of 11 games.

=== J.K. Kennedy era (1949–1966) ===
After the departure of Loucks, J.K. Kennedy became the coach. He was the first coach to find success at Florida State, holding the position for 18 years and compiling a record of 234–208.

=== Hugh Durham era (1966–1978) ===
Hugh Durham played at Florida State in the 1950s, scoring 1,381 points in three years. His average of 21.9 points per game in 1958–59 is the seventh best tally in Florida State history. Durham's career average of 18.9 points per game is still the ninth best in school history. After his playing career had ended, he began his coaching career as an assistant coach in 1959. Seven years later, Durham would be named head coach in 1966. One of the top players during this time was future NBA Hall-of-Famer Dave Cowens. Durham led the Seminoles from 1966 to 1978. In 1972, Durham led Florida State to a runner-up finish in the NCAA Tournament. A hard-fought 81–76 loss to the top-ranked UCLA Bruins in the NCAA Championship game prevented Durham's Florida State team from winning the NCAA tournament. Another key player for the Seminoles was Harry Davis, who helped the program sustain stability.

Durham's overall record at Florida State was a 230–95 record with three NCAA tournament bids. He still owns the highest winning percentage of any Florida State coach at .708. Durham is the only coach in NCAA history to be the all-time winningest coach (percentage or wins) at three different Division I schools.

=== Joe Williams era (1978–1986) ===
After the departure of Hugh Durham, Joe Williams took over the Seminole basketball program. One of the standout players during this period was George McCloud. McCloud helped the Seminoles rebuild after the departure of Durham by becoming one of the most prolific scorers in FSU history. During his senior season, McCloud had the second-highest scoring average and the sixth-highest in Florida State history. Joe Williams would coach his final season in 1986.

=== Pat Kennedy era (1986–1997) ===
The 1992–1993 season would see the emergence of one of the Seminoles' best players in its history, Bob Sura. Not much was expected of the Seminoles in 1992 as they entered into their first season in the ACC, yet they finished second in the conference to national champion Duke. The team repeated the second-place finish in 1993, establishing itself as a legitimate national power. In the 1993 NCAA Tournament they fell to Kentucky in the Elite Eight round. In Kennedy's final season (1996–1997) he led the team to the NIT Final, losing to the Michigan Wolverines.

=== Steve Robinson era (1997–2002) ===
Steve Robinson took over the program for the 1997–1998 season and led the Seminoles to the NCAA Tournament his first year. However, the team suffered losing records the next four seasons and Robinson left the program after the 2001–2002 campaign. Robinson is now an assistant coach with the Arizona Wildcats.

=== Leonard Hamilton era (2002–2025) ===
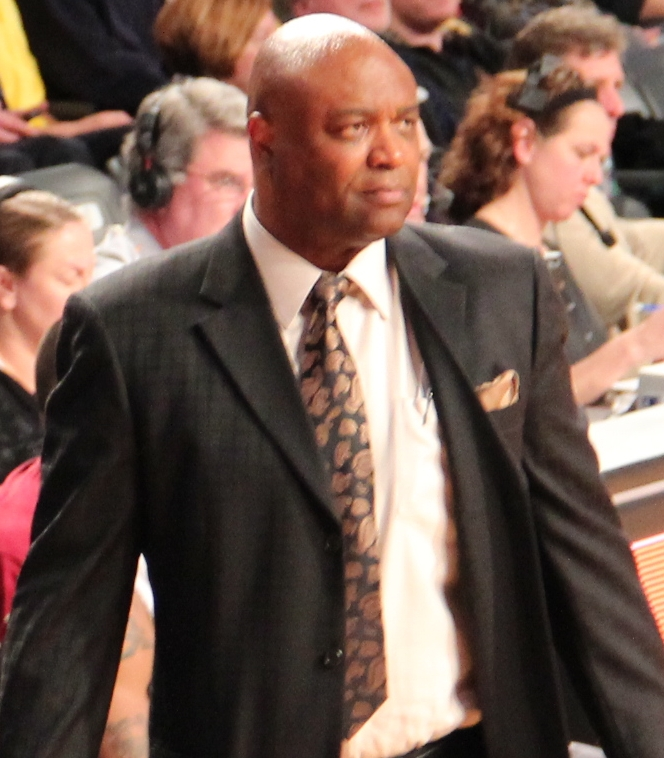
Hamilton is the winningest coach in school history.

Leonard Hamilton became Florida State's seventh head basketball coach on March 19, 2002. In two years, Tim Pickett scored 1,039 points, earning him First-Team All-ACC and All-American Honorable Mention honors. Hamilton was named ACC Coach of the Year in 2009, 2012, and 2020. Hamilton is also the first Seminole coach to win an ACC Championship, capturing the league tournament title in 2012 and the regular season title in 2020. He led the Seminoles to eight NCAA tournament appearances. During his tenure, Florida State was the third-most successful team in the conference. Hamilton is the winningest coach in the program's history, the fifth winningest coach in conference history, and sent twenty players to the NBA draft, including nine first round picks. Hamilton made the decision to retire in 2025 following the conclusion of the season, after serving as head coach for twenty-three seasons. In his final home game as head coach, Hamilton won his 200th regular-season ACC game, becoming just the fourth coach in the history of the conference to do so.

=== Luke Loucks era (2025–present) ===
On March 9, 2025, Sacramento Kings assistant coach Luke Loucks was announced as the team's new head coach following Leonard Hamilton's retirement. Loucks played for the Seminoles under Hamilton from 2008–2012, reaching the NCAA Tournament each season, and was a member of the 2012 ACC Tournament championship team.

== Current coaching staff ==
Name	Position
Luke Loucks	Head Coach
Michael Fly	Assistant Coach/General Manager
Jim Moran	Associate Head Coach/Offensive Coordinator
Gerald Gillion	Assistant Coach
Kyle Washington	Assistant Coach
Derwin Kitchen	Assistant Coach for Player Development
Ben O'Donnell	Strength and Conditioning Coach

=== Other staff ===
- Aiden Malone - Director of Operations
- Ryan Shnider - Assistant Director of Basketball Operations
- Justin Linder - Assistant Coach and Director of Player Development
- Sam Logwood - Director of Video and Scouting
- Terance Mann - Assistant General Manager
- Kelly Nielsen - Chief of Staff

== Home court ==
=== Donald L. Tucker Center ===
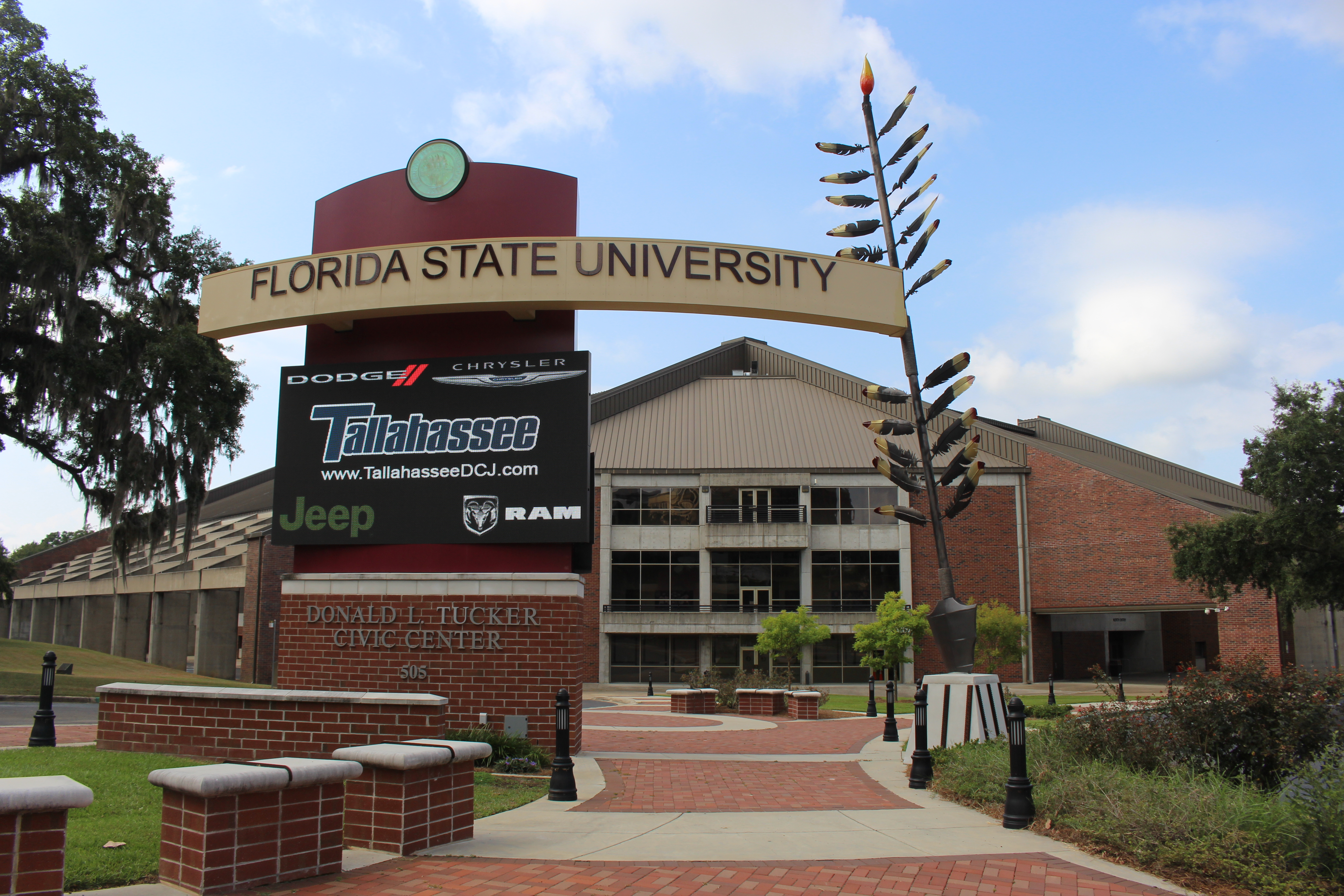
The Donald L. Tucker Center, home of the Seminoles

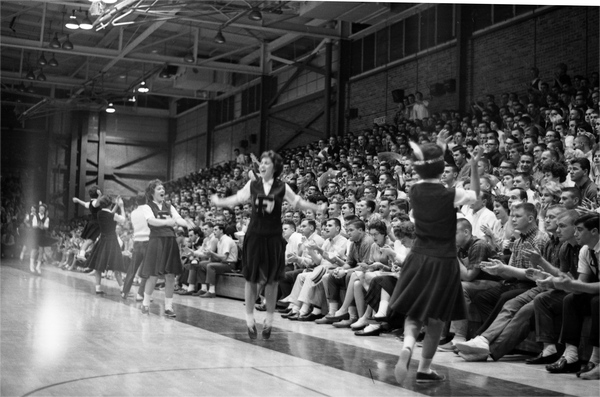
The Seminoles originally played home games at the Tully Gymnasium.

The Seminoles play all of their home games at the Donald L. Tucker Center. It is a 18,000-square-foot (1,700 m^{2}) multi-purpose facility which has hosted over 25 years worth of Seminole games. Since the 2016–2017 season, the Seminoles have gone undefeated twice at home and had twenty-five consecutive conference victories on their home court, the second longest streak in conference history.

== Championships ==
=== National Championship appearance ===
Florida State has appeared in the NCAA Division I Tournament's National Championship game once, in 1972. The Seminoles, coached by Hugh Durham, lost to John Wooden and his UCLA Bruins, 81–76, at the Memorial Sports Arena in Los Angeles, California. The Seminoles defeated powerhouse Kentucky in the Mideast Region Final and North Carolina in the Final Four.

Season	Coach	Site	Opponent	Result	Overall Record
1971–1972	Hugh Durham	Los Angeles Memorial Sports Arena	UCLA	FSU 76, UCLA 81	27–6
Total National Championship Game Appearances					1

==== Regional Championship ====
Florida State defeated Kentucky, 73–54, to win their only regional championship.

Season	Region
1971–1972	Mideast
Total Regional Championships	1

=== NIT Championship appearance ===
Florida State has appeared in the National Invitation Tournament's National Championship game once, in 1997. The Seminoles, coached by Pat Kennedy, lost to Michigan, coached by Steve Fisher, 82–73, at Madison Square Garden in New York City.

Season	Coach	Site	Opponent	Result	Overall Record
1996–1997	Pat Kennedy	Madison Square Garden	Michigan	FSU 73, Michigan 82	20–12
Total National Invitation Tournament Championship Game Appearances					1

=== Conference tournament championships ===
Conference Affiliations

- 1947: Independent
- 1948–1951: Dixie Conference
- 1951–1954: Independent
- 1954–1957: Florida Intercollegiate Conference
- 1957–1976: Independent
- 1976–1991: Metro Conference
- 1991–present: Atlantic Coast Conference

Season	Conference	Coach	Site	Opponent	PF	PA
1950–51	Dixie	J.K. Kennedy	Porter Gym (Macon, Georgia)	Mercer	65	69
1954–55	Florida Intercollegiate	J.K. Kennedy	Miami Beach Auditorium (Coral Gables, Florida)	Miami	86	80
1977–78	Metro	Hugh Durham	Riverfront Coliseum (Cincinnati, Ohio)	Louisville	93	94
1978–79	Metro	Joe Williams	Mid-South Coliseum (Memphis, Tennessee)	Virginia Tech	60	68
1979–80	Metro	Joe Williams	Freedom Hall (Louisville, Kentucky)	Louisville	72	81
1984–85	Metro	Joe Williams	Freedom Hall (Louisville, Kentucky)	Memphis State	86	90
1988–89	Metro	Pat Kennedy	Carolina Coliseum (Columbia, South Carolina)	Louisville	80	87
1990–91	Metro	Pat Kennedy	Roanoke Civic Center (Roanoke, Virginia)	Louisville	76	69
2008–09	ACC	Leonard Hamilton	Georgia Dome (Atlanta, Georgia)	Duke	69	79
2011–12	ACC	Leonard Hamilton	Philips Arena (Atlanta, Georgia)	North Carolina	85	82
2018–19	ACC	Leonard Hamilton	Spectrum Center (Charlotte, North Carolina)	Duke	63	73
2020–21	ACC	Leonard Hamilton	Greensboro Coliseum (Greensboro, North Carolina)	Georgia Tech	75	80
Championship Results:			3–9		910	952

=== Conference regular season championships ===
Season	Conference	Coach	Overall	Conference
1950–51	Dixie	J.K. Kennedy	18–9	7–0
1954–55	Florida Intercollegiate	J.K. Kennedy	22–4	10–0
1977–78	Metro	Hugh Durham	23–6	12–1
1988–89	Metro	Pat Kennedy	22–8	9–3
2019–20	ACC	Leonard Hamilton	26–5	16–4
Total Conference Titles			5	

== Records and results ==
=== Year-by-year results ===
National Champions	Conference Tournament Champions	Conference Regular Season Champions	NCAA Tournament	NIT Tournament

Note: W = Wins, L = Losses, C = Conference

Season	Coach	Conference	W	L	CW	CL	Notes
1947–48	Don Loucks	Independent	5	13			
1948–49	J.K. Kennedy	Dixie	12	12	6	6	
1949–50	J.K. Kennedy	Dixie	15	10	6	3	
1950–51	J.K. Kennedy	Dixie	18	9	7	0	NAIB Quarterfinalist
1951–52	J.K. Kennedy	Independent	5	20			
1952–53	J.K. Kennedy	Independent	11	11			
1953–54	J.K. Kennedy	Independent	13	7			
1954–55	J.K. Kennedy	Florida Intercollegiate	22	4	10	0	NAIA national tournament participant
1955–56	J.K. Kennedy	Florida Intercollegiate	16	9	9	1	
1956–57	J.K. Kennedy	Florida Intercollegiate	9	17	5	5	
1957–58	J.K. Kennedy	Independent	9	16			
1958–59	J.K. Kennedy	Independent	8	15			
1959–60	J.K. Kennedy	Independent	10	15			
1960–61	J.K. Kennedy	Independent	14	10			
1961–62	J.K. Kennedy	Independent	15	8			
1962–63	J.K. Kennedy	Independent	15	10			
1963–64	J.K. Kennedy	Independent	11	14			
1964–65	J.K. Kennedy	Independent	16	10			
1965–66	J.K. Kennedy	Independent	15	11			
1966–67	Hugh Durham	Independent	11	15			
1967–68	Hugh Durham	Independent	19	8			NCAA first round
1968–69	Hugh Durham	Independent	18	9			
1969–70	Hugh Durham	Independent	23	3			
1970–71	Hugh Durham	Independent	17	9			
1971–72	Hugh Durham	Independent	27	6			NCAA Runner-Up
1972–73	Hugh Durham	Independent	18	8			
1973–74	Hugh Durham	Independent	18	8			
1974–75	Hugh Durham	Independent	18	8			
1975–76	Hugh Durham	Independent	21	6			
1976–77	Hugh Durham	Metro	16	11	0	2	
1977–78	Hugh Durham	Metro	23	6	12	1	NCAA first round
1978–79	Joe Williams	Metro	19	10	7	3	
1979–80	Joe Williams	Metro	22	9	7	5	NCAA second round
1980–81	Joe Williams	Metro	17	11	7	5	
1981–82	Joe Williams	Metro	11	17	4	8	
1982–83	Joe Williams	Metro	14	14	6	8	
1983–84	Joe Williams	Metro	20	11	9	5	NIT Second Round
1984–85	Joe Williams	Metro	14	16	4	10	
1985–86	Joe Williams	Metro	12	17	3	9	
1986–87	Pat Kennedy	Metro	19	11	6	6	NIT Second Round
1987–88	Pat Kennedy	Metro	19	11	7	5	NCAA first round
1988–89	Pat Kennedy	Metro	22	8	9	3	NCAA first round
1989–90	Pat Kennedy	Metro	16	15	6	8	
1990–91	Pat Kennedy	Metro	21	11	9	5	NCAA second round
1991–92	Pat Kennedy	ACC	22	10	11	5	NCAA Sweet Sixteen
1992–93	Pat Kennedy	ACC	25	10	12	4	NCAA Elite Eight
1993–94	Pat Kennedy	ACC	13	14	6	10	
1994–95	Pat Kennedy	ACC	12	15	5	11	
1995–96	Pat Kennedy	ACC	13	14	5	11	
1996–97	Pat Kennedy	ACC	20	12	6	10	NIT Runner-Up
1997–98	Steve Robinson	ACC	18	14	6	10	NCAA second round
1998–99	Steve Robinson	ACC	13	17	5	11	
1999–00	Steve Robinson	ACC	12	17	6	10	
2000–01	Steve Robinson	ACC	9	21	4	12	
2001–02	Steve Robinson	ACC	12	17	4	12	
2002–03	Leonard Hamilton	ACC	14	15	4	12	
2003–04	Leonard Hamilton	ACC	19	14	6	10	NIT Second Round
2004–05	Leonard Hamilton	ACC	12	19	4	12	
2005–06	Leonard Hamilton	ACC	20	10	9	7	NIT Second Round
2006–07	Leonard Hamilton	ACC	0^{1}	13	0^{2}	9	NIT Quarterfinals
2007–08	Leonard Hamilton	ACC	19	15	7	9	NIT First Round
2008–09	Leonard Hamilton	ACC	25	10	10	6	NCAA first round
2009–10	Leonard Hamilton	ACC	22	10	10	6	NCAA first round
2010–11	Leonard Hamilton	ACC	23	11	11	5	NCAA Sweet Sixteen
2011–12	Leonard Hamilton	ACC	25	10	12	4	NCAA second round
2012–13	Leonard Hamilton	ACC	18	16	9	9	NIT First Round
2013–14	Leonard Hamilton	ACC	22	14	9	9	NIT Semifinals
2014–15	Leonard Hamilton	ACC	17	16	8	10	
2015–16	Leonard Hamilton	ACC	20	14	8	10	NIT Second Round
2016–17	Leonard Hamilton	ACC	26	9	12	6	NCAA second round
2017–18	Leonard Hamilton	ACC	23	12	9	9	NCAA Elite Eight
2018–19	Leonard Hamilton	ACC	29	8	13	5	NCAA Sweet Sixteen
2019–20	Leonard Hamilton	ACC	26	5	16	4	NCAA Tournament Cancelled
2020–21	Leonard Hamilton	ACC	18	7	11	4	NCAA Sweet Sixteen
2021–22	Leonard Hamilton	ACC	17	14	10	10	
2022–23	Leonard Hamilton	ACC	9	23	7	13	
2023–24	Leonard Hamilton	ACC	17	16	10	10	
2024–25	Leonard Hamilton	ACC	17	15	8	12	
2025–26	Luke Loucks	ACC	18	15	10	8	
2026–27	Luke Loucks	ACC	5	1	0	0	
Total:			1,324	951	421	403	
Win Percentage:			.582		.511		

*^{1}22 total wins vacated from the 2006–2007 basketball season due to the academic scandal
*^{2}7 ACC wins vacated from the 2006–2007 basketball season due to the academic scandal

=== Polls ===
Florida State has ended their basketball season ranked 15 times in either the AP or Coaches Poll. Top-10 finishes are colored ██

Year	Record	AP Poll	Coaches
1969–70	23–3	11	
1971–72	27–6	10	10
1975–76	21–6		16
1977–78	23–6	15	12
1988–89	22–8	16	16
1991–92	22–10	20	16
1992–93	25–10	11	7
2008–09	25–10	16	22
2010–11	23–11		19
2011–12	25–10	10	15
2016–17	26–9	16	24
2017–18	23–12		18
2018–19	29–8	10	13
2019–20	26–5	4	5
2020–21	18–7	14	10

A second-place ranking is the best the team has ever received.

=== Regular season tournaments ===
Tournament	Appearances	Best Result
Advocare Invitational	2018–19	Second
All College Tournament	1964–65, 1972–73	Third
Battle 4 Atlantis	2011–12	
Big Sun Classic	1973–74, 1975–76, 1977–78	Champions
Birmingham Classic	1977–78	Champions
Bluebonnet Classic	1973–74	Second
Cable Car Classic	1976–77	Second
Cabrillo Classic	1982–83	Third
Carousel Tournament	1955–56	
Citadel Invitational	1958–59	Fourth
Civitan Classic	1968–69, 1971–72	Champions
Coaches vs. Cancer	2012–13	Champions
Colonial Classic	2006–07	
Corpus Christi Caller Times Challenge	2004–05	
Cotton States Classic	1980–81	Champions
Dayton Invitational	1972–73, 1978–79, 1981–82	Second
Diamond Head Classic	2010–11	Third
ECAC Holiday Festival	1989–90	Third
Emerald Coast Classic	2019–20	Champions
ESPN Events Invitational	2022–23	Eighth
Evansville Tournament	1967–68	Second
Far West Classic	1971–72, 1975–76	Champions
Fiesta Bowl Classic	2002–03	Third
Florida Four Classic	1981–82, 1982–83	Second
Florida Sunshine Classic	1968–69, 1970–71, 1971–72	Champions
Gator Bowl Tournament	1951–52, 1954–55, 1959–60, 1960–61, 1963–64, 1969–70	Champions
Glenn Wilkes Classic	2007–08	
Global Sports Classic	2008–09	Champions
Great Alaska Shootout	1989–90, 2000–01	Fifth
Hall of Fame Tip-Off	2014–15, 2024–25	
IPTAY Tournament	1976–77	Second
Jacksonville Classic	2021–22	Champions
Jamaica Classic	2017–18	Champions
Louisville Holiday	1974–75	Second
Marshall Invitational	1972–73	Third
Mercer Bear Classic	1973–74	Third
Milwaukee Classic	1967–68	Third
NAIB District 25	1950–51, 1951–52, 1952–53, 1954–55	Champions
NAIB Nationals	1950–51, 1954–55	Quarterfinals
Naismith Basketball Hall of Fame Tip-Off	2014–15, 2024–25	
Old Dominion Classic	1978–79	Second
Old Spice Classic	2009–10	Champions
Orange Bowl Tournament	1955–56	
Paradise Jam	2015–16	Fifth
Pillsbury Classic	1977–78	Second
Pittsburgh Holiday Hoops Classic	2003–04	Second
Preseason NIT	1992–93, 1997–98, 2016–17	Second
Puerto Rico Tip-Off	2013–14	Third
Rainbow Classic	1998–99	Fifth
Red Lobster Classic	1986–87, 1987–88, 1988–89	Champions
Savannah Invitational	1962–63	Champions
Senior Bowl Tournament	1956–57, 1957–58, 1971–72	Champions
Steel Bowl tournament	1973–74	Second
Sun Bowl	1970–71	
Sunshine Slam	2023–24	Champions
Tampa Invitational	1965–66	Second
Vanderbilt Invitational	1964–65	Third
Vermont Classic	1976–77	Third

==== ACC-Big Ten Challenge ====
The Seminoles participated in the ACC-Big Ten Challenge 24 times, compiling a record of 10–14.

Year	Opponent	Location	Result
1999	Northwestern	Evanston, Illinois	W 60–46
2000	Minnesota	Tallahassee, Florida	L 71–79
2001	Northwestern	Evanston, Illinois	L 50–57
2002	Iowa	Tallahassee, Florida	W 80–67
2003	Northwestern	Tallahassee, Florida	W 71–53
2004	Minnesota	Minneapolis, Minnesota	W 70–69
2005	Purdue	Tallahassee, Florida	W 97–57
2006	Wisconsin	Madison, Wisconsin	L 66–81
2007	Minnesota	Tallahassee, Florida	W 75–61
2008	Northwestern	Evanston, Illinois	L 59–73
2009	Ohio State	Columbus, Ohio	L 64–77
2010	Ohio State	Tallahassee, Florida	L 44–58
2011	Michigan State	East Lansing, Michigan	L 49–65
2012	Minnesota	Tallahassee, Florida	L 68–77
2013	Minnesota	Minneapolis, Minnesota	L 61–71
2014	Nebraska	Tallahassee, Florida	L 65–70
2015	Iowa	Iowa City, Iowa	L 75–78 (OT)
2016	Minnesota	Tallahassee, Florida	W 75–67
2017	Rutgers	Piscataway, New Jersey	W 78–73
2018	Purdue	Tallahassee, Florida	W 73–72
2019	Indiana	Bloomington, Indiana	L 64–80
2020	Indiana	Tallahassee, Florida	W 69–67 (OT)
2021	Purdue	West Lafayette, Indiana	L 65–93
2022	Purdue	Tallahassee, Florida	L 69–79
Record			10–14 (.417)

==== ACC-SEC Challenge ====
The Seminoles have participated in the ACC-SEC Challenge on three occasions, compiling a record of 0–3.

Year	Opponent	Location	Result
2023	Georgia	Tallahassee, Florida	L 66–68
2024	LSU	Baton Rouge, Louisiana	L 75–85
2025	Georgia	Tallahassee, Florida	L 73–107
2026	Tennessee	Knoxville, Tennessee	
Record			0–3 (.000)

=== All-time record vs. ACC teams ===
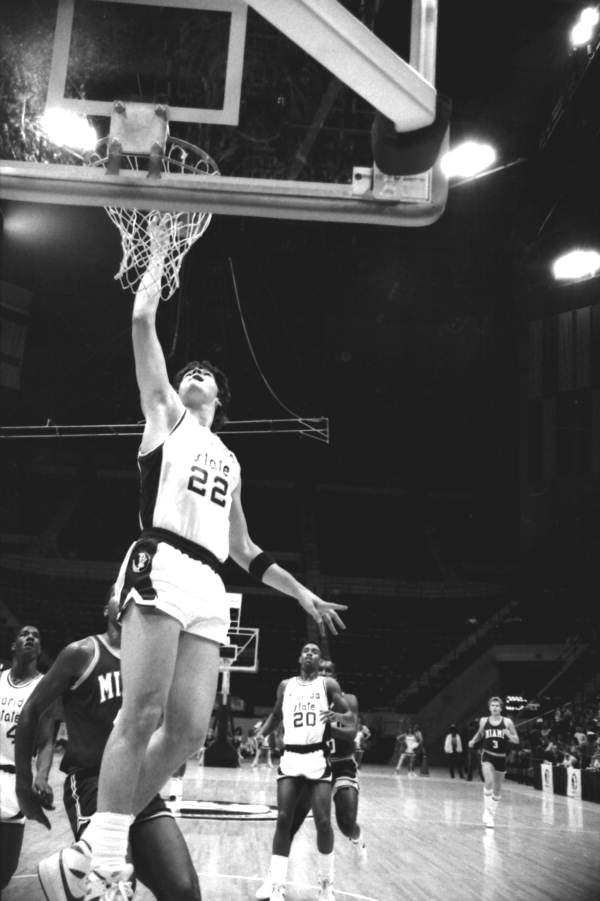
Florida State and Miami play twice yearly as conference foes.

Opponent	Won	Lost	Percentage	Streak	First Meeting
Boston College	16	10	.615	Won 1	2006
California	2	1	.750	Won 2	2008
Clemson	46^{^}	41	.529	Won 1	1951
Duke	10^{^}	46	.179	Lost 6	1955
Georgia Tech	48	34	.585	Won 2	1963
Louisville	18	37	.327	Lost 3	1968
Miami	57^{^}	38	.600	Lost 1	1950
North Carolina	17	57	.230	Lost 7	1965
NC State	31^{^}	35	.470	Lost 3	1955
Notre Dame	13	5	.722	Won 6	2011
Pittsburgh	9	16	.360	Won 2	1973
SMU	3	2	.600	Won 1	2006
Stanford	1	2	.333	Won 1	2022
Syracuse	8	12	.400	Lost 2	1990
Virginia	28	31	.475	Lost 5	1992
Virginia Tech	38^{^}	26	.594	Won 1	1968
Wake Forest	30^{^}	29	.508	Lost 1	1958
Totals	374	423	.469		

*^{^}wins vacated from the 2006–2007 basketball season due to the academic scandal

=== Rivals ===
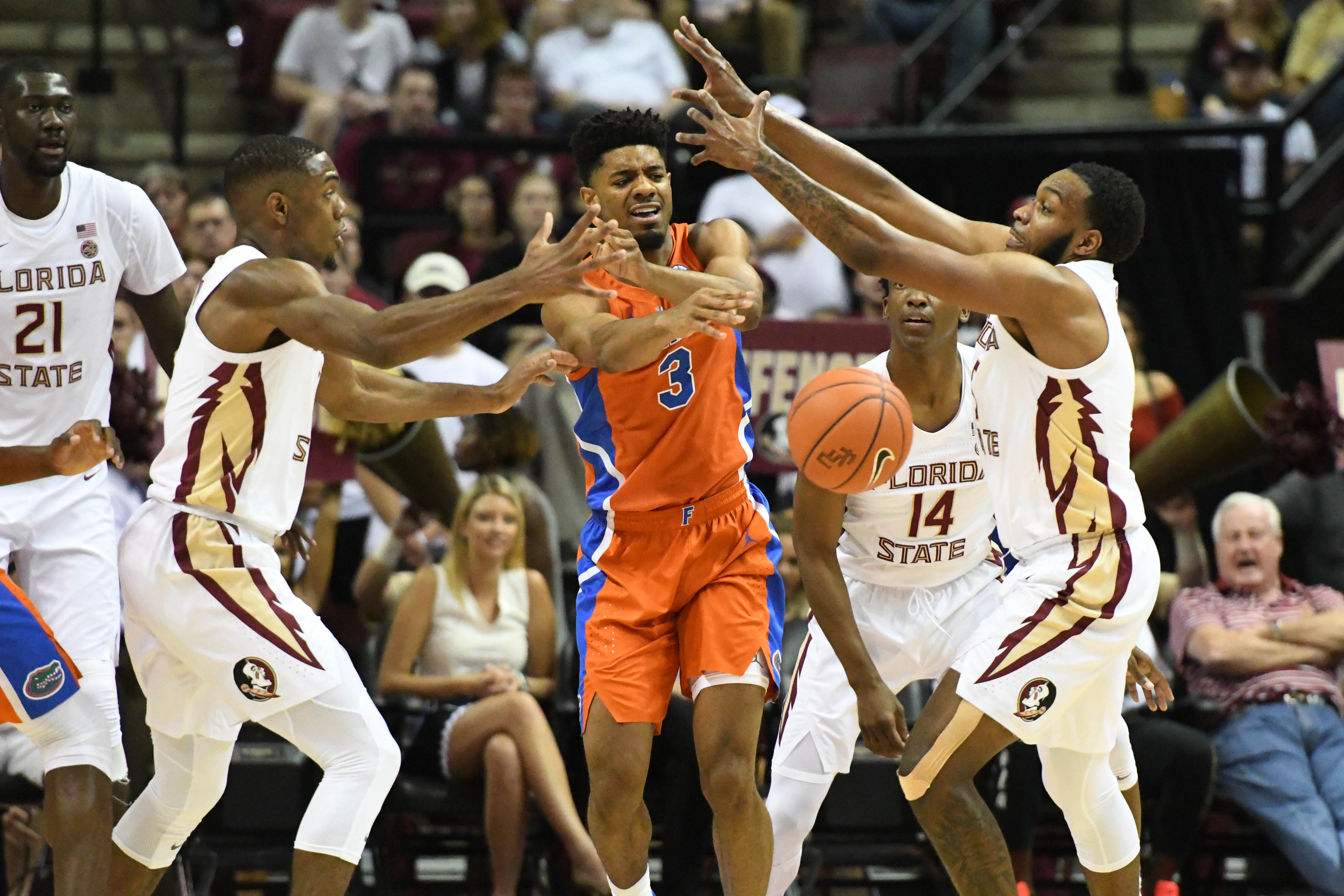
Florida State and Florida renew their rivalry annually.

Opponent	Won	Lost	Percentage	Streak	First Meeting
Florida	28^{^}	49	.364	Lost 6	1951
Miami	57^{^}	38	.600	Lost 1	1950
Totals	80	87	.479		

*^{^}wins vacated from the 2006–2007 basketball season due to the academic scandal

=== FSU vs. AP Ranked #1 ===
Date	Location	FSU Rank	Opponent	Outcome	PF	PA
January 31, 1958	Morgantown, WV		West Virginia	L	51	103
December 2, 1961	Columbus, OH		Ohio State	L	57	72
March 25, 1972	Los Angeles, CA	10	UCLA	L	76	81
December 8, 1975	Indianapolis, IN	10	Indiana	L	59	83
March 11, 1978	Knoxville, TN	13	Kentucky	L	76	85
December 31, 1985	Charlotte, NC		North Carolina	L	64	109
December 22, 1990	Las Vegas, NV		UNLV	L	69	101
January 6, 1992	Durham, NC		Duke	L	70	86
January 30, 1992	Tallahassee, FL	23	Duke	L	62	75
December 20, 1997	Tallahassee, FL	17	North Carolina	L	73	81
February 17, 1999	Tallahassee, FL		Duke	L	59	85
January 6, 2002	Tallahassee, FL		Duke	W	77	76
February 7, 2002	Durham, NC		Duke	L	49	80
January 29, 2004	Durham, NC		Duke	L	49	56
March 1, 2006	Tallahassee, FL		Duke	W	79	74
March 4, 2008	Chapel Hill, NC		North Carolina	L	77	90
March 14, 2008	Charlotte, NC		North Carolina	L	70	82
March 14, 2009	Atlanta, GA	22	North Carolina	W	73	70
January 12, 2011	Tallahassee, FL		Duke	W	66	61
January 12, 2019	Tallahassee, FL	13	Duke	L	78	80
March 12, 2026	Charlotte, NC		Duke	L	79	80
November 10, 2026	Tallahassee, FL	L	Florida	72	81	
Total:		4–18			1485	1791

=== NCAA tournament results ===
The Seminoles have appeared in the NCAA tournament 18 times, with a record of 23–18.

Year	Round	Opponent	Result
1968	First Round	East Tennessee State	L 69–79
1972	First Round; Sweet Sixteen; Elite Eight; Final Four; National Championship	Eastern Kentucky; Minnesota; Kentucky; North Carolina; UCLA	W 83–81; W 70–56; W 73–54; W 79–75; L 76–81
1978	First Round	Kentucky	L 76–85
1980	First Round; Second Round	#9 Toledo #1 Kentucky	W 94–91; L 78–97
1988	First Round	#5 Iowa	L 98–102
1989	First Round	#13 Middle Tennessee	L 83–97
1991	First Round; Second Round	#10 USC #2 Indiana	W 75–72; L 69–82
1992	First Round; Second Round; Sweet Sixteen	#14 Montana #6 Georgetown #2 Indiana	W 78–68; W 78–68; L 74–85
1993	First Round; Second Round; Sweet Sixteen; Elite Eight	#14 Evansville #11 Tulane #7 Western Kentucky #1 Kentucky	W 82–70; W 94–63; W 81–78^{OT} L 81–106
1998	First Round; Second Round	#5 TCU #13 Valparaiso	W 96–87; L 77–83^{OT}
2009	First Round	#12 Wisconsin	L 59–61^{OT}
2010	First Round	#8 Gonzaga	L 60–67
2011	First Round; Second Round; Sweet Sixteen	#7 Texas A&M #2 Notre Dame #11 VCU	W 57–50; W 71–57; L 71–72^{OT}
2012	First Round; Second Round	#14 St. Bonaventure #6 Cincinnati	W 66–63; L 56–62
2017	First Round; Second Round	#14 Florida Gulf Coast #11 Xavier	W 86–80; L 66–91
2018	First Round; Second Round; Sweet Sixteen; Elite Eight	#8 Missouri #1 Xavier #4 Gonzaga #3 Michigan	W 67–54; W 75–70; W 75–60; L 54–58
2019	First Round; Second Round; Sweet Sixteen	#13 Vermont #12 Murray State #1 Gonzaga	W 76–69; W 90–62; L 58–72
2021	First Round; Second Round; Sweet Sixteen	#13 UNC Greensboro #5 Colorado #1 Michigan	W 64–54; W 71–53; L 58–76

==== NCAA tournament seeding ====
The NCAA began seeding the tournament with the 1979 edition.

Years →	'80	'88	'89	'91	'92	'93	'98	'09	'10	'11	'12	'17	'18	'19	'21
Seeds →	8	12	4	7	3	3	12	5	9	10	3	3	9	4	4

=== NIT results ===
The Seminoles have appeared in the National Invitation Tournament (NIT) ten times. Their combined record is 14–10.

Year	Round	Opponent	Result
1984	First Round; Second Round	NC State; Pittsburgh	W 74–71; L 63–66
1987	First Round; Second Round	Rhode Island; Vanderbilt	W 107–92; L 92–109
1997	First Round; Second Round; Quarterfinals; Semifinals; Finals	Syracuse; Michigan State; West Virginia; Connecticut; Michigan	W 82–67; W 68–63; W 76–71; W 71–65; L 73–82
2004	First Round; Second Round	Wichita State; Iowa State	W 91–84; L 59–62
2006	First Round; Second Round	#8 Butler #3 South Carolina	W 67–63; L 68–69
2007	First Round; Second Round; Quarterfinals	#7 Toledo #3 Michigan #1 Mississippi State	W 77–61; W 87–66; L 71–86
2008	First Round	#6 Akron	L 60–65^{OT}
2013	First Round	#5 Louisiana Tech	L 66–71
2014	First Round; Second Round; Quarterfinals; Semifinals	#8 Florida Gulf Coast #4 Georgetown #3 Louisiana Tech #1 Minnesota	W 58–53; W 101–90; W 78–75; L 64–67^{OT}
2016	First Round; Second Round	#5 Davidson #1 Valparaiso	W 84–74; L 69–81

==== NIT seeding ====
The NCAA began seeding the tournament with the 2006 edition.

Years →	'06	'07	'08	'13	'14	'16
Seeds →	2	2	3	4	1	4

=== ACC Tournament results ===
The ACC men's basketball tournament is the conference championship tournament in basketball for the Atlantic Coast Conference. It is a single-elimination tournament and seeding is based on regular season records. The winner receives the conference's automatic bid to the NCAA basketball tournament.

Florida State has won the ACC Tournament once, in 2012, under coach Leonard Hamilton. The Seminoles have a record of 22–33 at the ACC Tournament.

Year	Seed	Round	Opponent	Result
1992	#2	Quarterfinals; Semifinals	#7 NC State #3 North Carolina	W 93–80; L 76–80
1993	#2	Quarterfinals	#7 Clemson	L 75–87
1994	#7	Quarterfinals	#2 North Carolina	L 69–83
1995	#7	Quarterfinals	#2 Maryland	L 64–71
1996	#8	First Round	#9 NC State	L 65–80
1997	#7	Quarterfinals	#2 Wake Forest	L 65–66
1998	#7	First Round	#8 NC State	L 63–65
1999	#8	First Round; Quarterfinals	#7 Clemson #2 Maryland	W 87–85; L 69–93
2000	#7	First Round; Quarterfinals	#8 Georgia Tech #2 Maryland	W 63–62; L 61–82
2001	#8	First Round	#9 Clemson	L 64–66
2002	#8	First Round; Quarterfinals	#9 Clemson #1 Maryland	W 91–84; L 59–85
2003	#9	First Round; Quarterfinals	#8 Clemson #1 Wake Forest	W 72–61; L 61–69
2004	#7	Quarterfinals	#2 NC State	L 71–78
2005	#10	First Round	#7 NC State	L 54–70
2006	#5	First Round	#12 Wake Forest	L 66–78
2007	#9	First Round; Quarterfinals	#8 Clemson #1 North Carolina	W 67–66; L 58–73
2008	#9	First Round; Quarterfinals	#8 Wake Forest #2 North Carolina	W 70–60; L 70–82
2009	#4	Quarterfinals; Semifinals; Championship Game	#12 Georgia Tech #1 North Carolina #3 Duke	W 64–62; W 73–70; L 69–79
2010	#3	Quarterfinals	#11 NC State	L 52–58
2011	#3	Quarterfinals	#6 Virginia Tech	L 52–51
2012	#3	Quarterfinals; Semifinals; Championship Game	#6 Miami (FL) #2 Duke #1 North Carolina	W 82–71; W 62–59; W 85–82
2013	#6	First Round; Quarterfinals	#11 Clemson #3 North Carolina	W 73–69; L 62–83
2014	#9	Second Round; Quarterfinals	#8 Maryland #1 Virginia	W 67–65; L 51–64
2015	#9	Second Round; Quarterfinals	#8 Clemson #1 Virginia	W 76–73; L 44–58
2016	#12	First Round; Second Round	#14 Boston College #6 Virginia Tech	W 88–66; L 85–96
2017	#2	Quarterfinals; Semifinals	#7 Virginia Tech #3 Notre Dame	W 74–68; L 73–77
2018	#8	Second Round	#9 Louisville	L 74–82
2019	#4	Quarterfinals; Semifinals; Championship Game	#5 Virginia Tech #1 Virginia #3 Duke	W 65–63^{OT} W 69–59; L 63–73
2020	#1	-	-	-
2021	#2	Semifinals; Championship Game	#6 North Carolina #4 Georgia Tech	W 69–66; L 75–80
2022	#8	Second Round	#9 Syracuse	L 57–96
2023	#12	First Round	#13 Georgia Tech	L 60–61
2024	#9	Second Round; Quarterfinals	#8 Virginia Tech #1 North Carolina	W 86–76; L 67–92
2025	#11	First Round	#14 Syracuse	L 62–66
2026	#8	Second Round; Quarterfinals	#9 California #1 Duke	W 95–89; L 79–80

== Awards ==
=== All-Americans ===
- Collegiate All-Americans (Associated Press)
  - Dave Fedor, 1961 & 1962 All-American (Honorable Mention)
  - Dave Cowens, 1970 All-American (Honorable Mention)
  - Harry Davis, 1978 All-American (Honorable Mention)
  - Mickey Dillard, 1981 All-American (Honorable Mention)
  - Mitchell Wiggins, 1982 & 1983 All-American (Honorable Mention)
  - Alton Lee Gipson, 1984 All-American (Honorable Mention)
  - George McCloud, 1989 All-American (3rd Team)
  - Sam Cassell, 1992 All-American (Honorable Mention)
  - Doug Edwards, 1993 All-American (Honorable Mention)
  - Charlie Ward, 1993 All-American (Honorable Mention)
  - Bob Sura, 1993 & 1994 & 1995 All-American (Honorable Mention)
  - Tim Pickett, 2004 All-American (Honorable Mention)
  - Al Thornton, 2007 All-American (3rd Team)
  - Toney Douglas, 2009 All-American (3rd Team)
- McDonald's All-Americans
  - David White, 1987 Selection
  - Doug Edwards, 1989 Selection
  - LaMarr Greer, 1994 Selection
  - Corey Louis, 1994 Selection
  - Randell Jackson, 1995 Selection
  - Anthony Richardson, 2001 Selection
  - Von Wafer, 2003 Selection
  - Chris Singleton, 2008 Selection
  - Michael Snaer, 2009 Selection
  - Dwayne Bacon, 2015 Selection
  - M. J. Walker, 2017 Selection
  - Scottie Barnes, 2020 Selection

Jonathan Isaac was ineligible in 2016 due to his status as a postgraduate student.

=== Conference awards ===
ACC Coach of the Year

- Pat Kennedy (1992)
- Leonard Hamilton (2009, 2012, 2020)

ACC Defensive Player of the Year

- Toney Douglas (2009)
- Chris Singleton (2010)

ACC Sixth Man of the Year

- Mfiondu Kabengele (2019)
- Patrick Williams (2020)
- Scottie Barnes (2021)
- Matthew Cleveland (2022)

ACC Rookie/Freshman of the Year

- Bob Sura (1992)
- Scottie Barnes (2021)

=== National awards ===
Ben Jobe National Coach of the Year Award

- Leonard Hamilton (2021)

== Players ==
=== Notable alumni ===
For a dynamic list of notable players satisfying Wikipedia's general notability criteria, see Category:Florida State Seminoles men's basketball players.

=== Retired numbers ===
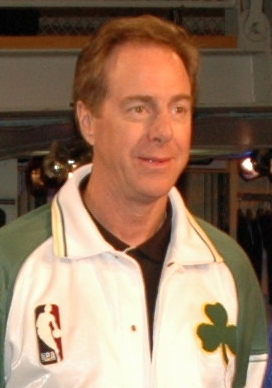
Dave Cowens was the first player to have his number retired by the Seminoles.

No.	Player	Pos.	Career	Ref.
13	Dave Cowens	C	1968–70	
12	Charlie Ward	PG	1990–94	

=== Honored jerseys ===
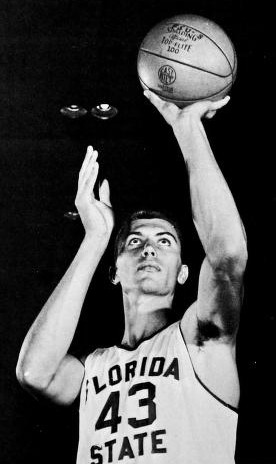
Fedor is one of several Seminoles whose jersey has been honored by the university.

Some jerseys have been honored although their numbers are still active.

No.	Player	Pos.	Career
3	Bob Sura	SG	1991–95
10	Sam Cassell	PG	1991–93
21	George McCloud	F	1985–89
25	Hugh Durham	G	1957–59
33	Ron King	SG	1971–73
43	Dave Fedor	F	1960–62

=== Hall of Fame inductees ===
One FSU player and coach has been inducted into the College Basketball Hall of Fame.

College Basketball Hall of Fame inductees
Year Inducted	Name	Career
2006	Dave Cowens	Player: 1967-1970
2016	Hugh Durham	Player: 1957–59; Head Coach: 1967–78

=== NBA draft ===
FSU has had a total of 53 draft picks in the history of the NBA draft and has had 34 players drafted in the first 60 picks, the modern draft equivalent:

- 1. 1962 NBA Draft, 3rd Round, 23rd Pick, Dave Fedor, Former NBA Player
- 2. 1970 NBA Draft, 1st Round, 4th Pick, Dave Cowens, Former NBA Player, Hall of Fame, 1973 NBA MVP, 8x NBA All Star
- 3. 1970 NBA Draft, 3rd Round, 38th Pick, Willie Williams, Former NBA Player
- 4. 1978 NBA Draft, 2nd Round, 33rd Pick, Harry Davis, Former NBA Player
- 5. 1981 NBA Draft, 2nd Round, 42nd Pick, Elvis Rolle, Former NBA Player
- 6. 1981 NBA Draft, 3rd Round, 55th Pick, Mickey Dillard, Former NBA Player
- 7. 1983 NBA Draft, 1st Round, 23rd Pick, Mitchell Wiggins, Former NBA Player
- 8. 1989 NBA Draft, 1st Round, 7th Pick, George McCloud, Former NBA Player
- 9. 1993 NBA Draft, 1st Round, 15th Pick, Doug Edwards, Former NBA Player
- 10. 1993 NBA Draft, 1st Round, 24th Pick, Sam Cassell, Former NBA Player, 1x NBA All Star
- 11. 1994 NBA Draft, 1st Round, 26th pick, Charlie Ward, Former NBA Player
- 12. 1995 NBA Draft, 1st Round, 17th Pick, Bob Sura, Former NBA Player
- 13. 1997 NBA Draft, 2nd Round, 36th Pick, James Collins, Former NBA Player
- Leonard Hamilton Becomes Head Coach (2002)
- 14. 2004 NBA Draft, 2nd Round, 44th Pick, Tim Pickett, Former NBA Player
- 15. 2005 NBA Draft, 2nd Round, 39th Pick, Von Wafer, Former NBA Player
- 16. 2006 NBA Draft, 2nd Round, 45th Pick, Alexander Johnson, Former NBA Player
- 17. 2007 NBA Draft, 1st Round, 14th Pick, Al Thornton, Former NBA Player
- 18. 2009 NBA Draft, 1st Round, 29th Pick, Toney Douglas, Former NBA Player
- 19. 2010 NBA Draft, 2nd Round, 50th Pick, Solomon Alabi, Former NBA Player
- 20. 2010 NBA Draft, 2nd Round, 57th Pick, Ryan Reid, Former NBA Player
- 21. 2011 NBA Draft, 1st Round, 18th Pick, Chris Singleton, Former NBA Player
- 22. 2012 NBA Draft, 2nd Round, 33rd Pick, Bernard James, Former NBA Player
- 23. 2016 NBA Draft, 1st Round, 19th Pick, Malik Beasley, NBA Player, Minnesota Timberwolves
- 24. 2017 NBA Draft, 1st Round, 6th Pick, Jonathan Isaac, NBA Player, Orlando Magic
- 25. 2017 NBA Draft, 2nd Round, 40th Pick, Dwayne Bacon, NBA Player, Orlando Magic
- 26. 2019 NBA Draft, 1st Round, 27th Pick, Mfiondu Kabengele, NBA Player, Cleveland Cavaliers
- 27. 2019 NBA Draft, 2nd Round, 48th Pick, Terance Mann, NBA Player, Los Angeles Clippers
- 28. 2020 NBA Draft, 1st Round, 4th Pick, Patrick Williams, NBA Player, Chicago Bulls
- 29. 2020 NBA Draft, 1st Round, 11th Pick, Devin Vassell, NBA Player, San Antonio Spurs
- 30. 2021 NBA Draft, 1st Round, 4th Pick, Scottie Barnes, NBA Player, Toronto Raptors
- 31. 2021 NBA Draft, 2nd Round, 57th Pick, Balša Koprivica, NBA Player, Detroit Pistons
- 32. 2021 NBA Draft, 2nd Round, 59th Pick, RaiQuan Gray, NBA Player, Brooklyn Nets
- 33. 2025 NBA Draft, 2nd Round, 43rd Pick, Jamir Watkins, NBA Player, Washington Wizards
- 34. 2026 NBA Draft, 2nd Round, 54th Pick, Lajae Jones, NBA Player, Golden State Warriors

Lottery selections (or their pre-lottery equivalent) are italicized

== Mascot ==
Florida State recently revived the character of Cimarron, a costume mascot that makes appearances at many FSU athletic events and functions. In addition, the character makes public appearances and is available for functions at area schools and service projects, as well as with the spirit groups.

== See also ==
- Florida State Seminoles women's basketball
- History of Florida State University
- List of Florida State University professional athletes
