= Bernard James =

American basketball player (born 1985)

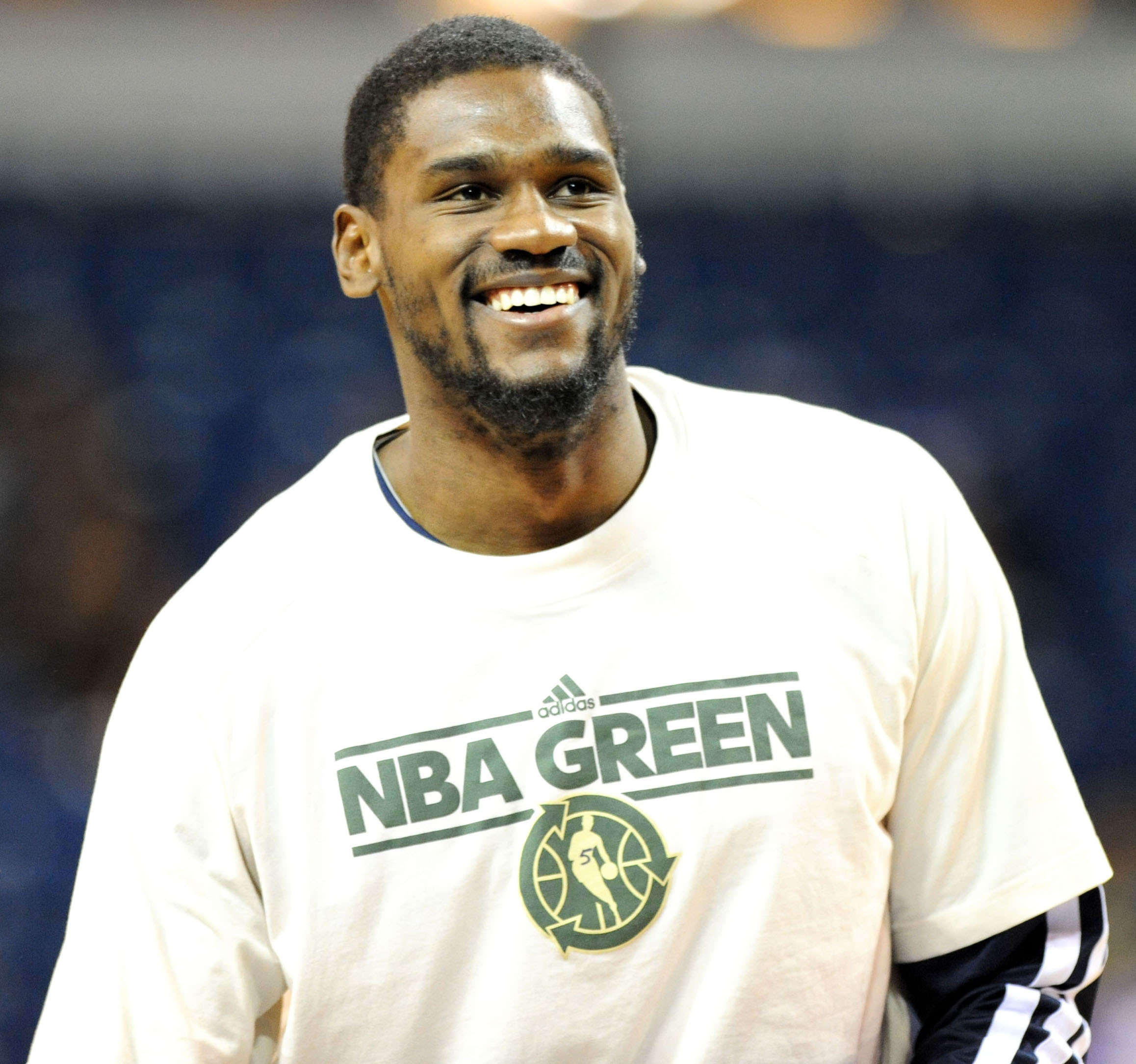
- James with the Dallas Mavericks in 2013

Personal information
- Born: February 7, 1985 (age 41) Savannah, Georgia, U.S.
- Listed height: 6 ft 10 in (2.08 m)
- Listed weight: 240 lb (109 kg)

Career information
- High school: Windsor Forest (Savannah, Georgia)
- College: Tallahassee CC (2008–2010); Florida State (2010–2012)
- NBA draft: 2012: 2nd round, 33rd overall pick
- Drafted by: Cleveland Cavaliers
- Playing career: 2012–2017
- Position: Center
- Number: 5, 55

Career history
- 2012–2014: Dallas Mavericks
- 2014: →Texas Legends
- 2014: Texas Legends
- 2014–2015: Shanghai Sharks
- 2015: Dallas Mavericks
- 2015–2016: Shanghai Sharks
- 2016: Galatasaray
- 2017: Limoges CSP
- 2017: Anhui Dragons

Career highlights
- ACC All-Defensive team (2012); USBWA Most Courageous Award (2012)
- Stats at NBA.com
- Stats at Basketball Reference

Bernard Ronald James (born February 7, 1985) is an American former professional basketball player. He played college basketball for the Florida State Seminoles. James was selected in the 2012 NBA draft and spent three seasons in the National Basketball Association (NBA) with the Dallas Mavericks.

== Background ==
In a 2012 piece for The Tipoff, the magazine of the United States Basketball Writers Association, ESPN.com writer Dana O'Neil called James

...the most unconventional of high school dropouts, a kid who grew disenchanted with the social hierarchy of school yet would head to Barnes & Noble to read on the days that he cut.

After dropping out, he earned his GED, and shortly afterwards enlisted in the United States Air Force while still 17. He served six years in the Air Force as a security forces specialist, attaining the rank of Staff Sergeant. He was assigned to the 9th Security Forces Squadron at Beale Air Force Base and deployed in support of Operation Iraqi Freedom and Operation Enduring Freedom to Iraq, Qatar, and Afghanistan.

He initially planned to have a career in the military, but was drafted onto an intramural basketball team at his base. During this time, he underwent a late growth spurt of 5 inches (13 cm), and soon rose through the ranks of military basketball to the Air Force's all-star team. This in turn led him to pursue basketball as a potential career path; when his enlistment term expired, he left the Air Force and enrolled at Tallahassee Community College so that he could eventually fully qualify for NCAA Division I.

== Professional career ==
James was selected as the 33rd overall pick by the Cleveland Cavaliers in the 2012 NBA draft. He was later traded to the Dallas Mavericks in a draft night trade that included the 24th overall pick Jared Cunningham and the 34th overall pick Jae Crowder. The Cavaliers received guard Kelenna Azubuike and the 17th overall pick Tyler Zeller.

On July 25, 2012, James signed with the Dallas Mavericks. On July 19, 2013, he was waived by the Mavericks, but he was quickly re-signed on July 26.

On February 27, 2014, James was assigned to the Texas Legends of the NBA D-League. He was recalled the next day.

On September 3, 2014, James re-signed with the Mavericks. However, he was later waived by the Mavericks on October 25, 2014. On November 3, 2014, he was acquired by the Texas Legends as an affiliate player. After playing in the Legends' first two games of the season, he left the team in order to sign in China. On November 21, 2014, he signed with the Shanghai Sharks for the 2014–15 CBA season.

On February 11, 2015, James signed a 10-day contract with the Dallas Mavericks, returning to the franchise for a second stint. He signed a second 10-day contract with the Mavericks on February 21, and for the rest of the season on March 3.

On July 31, 2015, James re-signed with the Shanghai Sharks for the 2015–16 CBA season. On March 12, 2016, he signed with Galatasaray of Turkey for the rest of the 2015–16 Turkish Basketball Super League season. In early May 2016, he left Galatasaray.

On January 6, 2017, James signed with French club Limoges CSP for the rest of the 2016–17 Pro A season. On February 7, 2017, he parted ways with Limoges after appearing in two games.

== NBA career statistics ==
Legend
GP	Games played	GS	Games started	MPG	Minutes per game
FG%	Field goal percentage	3P%	3-point field goal percentage	FT%	Free throw percentage
RPG	Rebounds per game	APG	Assists per game	SPG	Steals per game
BPG	Blocks per game	PPG	Points per game	**Bold**	Career high

=== Regular season ===
Year	Team	GP	GS	MPG	FG%	3P%	FT%	RPG	APG	SPG	BPG	PPG
2012–13	Dallas	**46**	**11**	**9.9**	**.515**	.000	.610	**2.8**	.1	**.3**	.8	**2.8**
2013–14	Dallas	30	0	4.9	.478	.000	.545	1.4	.1	.1	.3	.9
2014–15	Dallas	16	2	**9.9**	.444	.000	**.870**	2.4	**.3**	.1	**.9**	**2.8**
Career		92	13	8.3	.497	.000	.680	2.3	.1	.2	.7	2.2

=== Playoffs ===
Year	Team	GP	GS	MPG	FG%	3P%	FT%	RPG	APG	SPG	BPG	PPG
2014	Dallas	**2**	0	**4.0**	.000	.000	.000	**.5**	.0	**.5**	.0	.0
2015	Dallas	1	0	2.0	.000	.000	.000	.0	.0	.0	.0	.0
Career		3	0	3.3	.000	.000	.000	.3	.0	.3	.0	.0
