= Virginia Tech Hokies men's basketball statistical leaders =

The Virginia Tech Hokies men's basketball statistical leaders are individual statistical leaders of the Virginia Tech Hokies men's basketball program in various categories, including points, assists, blocks, rebounds, and steals. Within those areas, the lists identify single-game, single-season, and career leaders. The Hokies represent Virginia Tech in the NCAA's Atlantic Coast Conference.

Virginia Tech began competing in intercollegiate basketball in 1908. However, the school's record book does not generally list records from before the 1950s, as records from before this period are often incomplete and inconsistent. Since scoring was much lower in this era, and teams played much fewer games during a typical season, it is likely that few or no players from this era would appear on these lists anyway.

The NCAA did not officially record assists as a stat until the 1983–84 season, and blocks and steals until the 1985–86 season, but Virginia Tech's record books includes players in these stats before these seasons. These lists are updated through the end of the 2020–21 season.

== Scoring ==
Career
| Rk | Player | Points | Seasons |
|---|---|---|---|
| 1 | Bimbo Coles | 2484 | 1986–87 1987–88 1988–89 1989–90 |
| 2 | Dell Curry | 2389 | 1982–83 1983–84 1984–85 1985–86 |
| 3 | Malcolm Delaney | 2255 | 2007–08 2008–09 2009–10 2010–11 |
| 4 | Dale Solomon | 2136 | 1978–79 1979–80 1980–81 1981–82 |
| 5 | Perry Young | 1899 | 1981–82 1982–83 1983–84 1984–85 |
| 6 | Ángel Daniel Vassallo | 1822 | 2005–06 2006–07 2007–08 2008–09 |
| 7 | Allan Bristow | 1804 | 1970–71 1971–72 1972–73 |
| 8 | Zabian Dowdell | 1785 | 2003–04 2004–05 2005–06 2006–07 |
| 9 | Bob Ayersman | 1782 | 1957–58 1958–59 1959–60 1960–61 |
| 10 | Erick Green | 1742 | 2009–10 2010–11 2011–12 2012–13 |

Season
| Rk | Player | Points | Season |
|---|---|---|---|
| 1 | Erick Green | 801 | 2012–13 |
| 2 | Bimbo Coles | 785 | 1989–90 |
| 3 | Dell Curry | 722 | 1985–86 |
| 4 | Bimbo Coles | 717 | 1988–89 |
| 5 | Bimbo Coles | 702 | 1987–88 |
| 6 | Wally Lancaster | 679 | 1987–88 |
| 7 | Dell Curry | 674 | 1983–84 |
| 8 | Malcolm Delaney | 667 | 2009–10 |
| 9 | Allan Bristow | 650 | 1971–72 |
| 10 | Ángel Daniel Vassallo | 648 | 2008–09 |

Single game
| Rk | Player | Points | Season | Opponent |
|---|---|---|---|---|
| 1 | Allan Bristow | 52 | 1972–73 | George Washington |

== Rebounds ==
Career
| Rk | Player | Rebounds | Seasons |
|---|---|---|---|
| 1 | Chris Smith | 1508 | 1957–58 1958–59 1959–60 1960–61 |
| 2 | Bill Matthews | 1379 | 1952–53 1953–54 1954–55 1955–56 |
| 3 | Ace Custis | 1177 | 1993–94 1994–95 1995–96 1996–97 |
| 4 | Jeff Allen | 1111 | 2007–08 2008–09 2009–10 2010–11 |
| 5 | Allan Bristow | 987 | 1970–71 1971–72 1972–73 |
| 6 | John Rivers | 903 | 1988–89 1989–90 1990–91 1991–92 |
| 7 | Dale Solomon | 856 | 1978–79 1979–80 1980–81 1981–82 |
| 8 | Wayne Robinson | 852 | 1976–77 1977–78 1978–79 1979–80 |
| 9 | Bobby Beecher | 797 | 1982–83 1983–84 1984–85 1985–86 |
| 10 | Perry Young | 779 | 1981–82 1982–83 1983–84 1984–85 |

Season
| Rk | Player | Rebounds | Season |
|---|---|---|---|
| 1 | Chris Smith | 495 | 1959–60 |
| 2 | Bill Matthews | 470 | 1954–55 |
| 3 | Chris Smith | 429 | 1958–59 |
| 4 | Bill Matthews | 370 | 1955–56 |
| 5 | Ace Custis | 369 | 1994–95 |
| 6 | Chris Smith | 362 | 1960–61 |
| 7 | Allan Bristow | 348 | 1971–72 |
| 8 | Jeff Allen | 330 | 2010–11 |
| 9 | Bill Matthews | 327 | 1953–54 |
| | Allan Bristow | 327 | 1970–71 |

Single game
| Rk | Player | Rebounds | Season | Opponent |
|---|---|---|---|---|
| 1 | Chris Smith | 36 | 1958–59 | Washington & Lee |

== Assists ==
Career
| Rk | Player | Assists | Seasons |
|---|---|---|---|
| 1 | Justin Robinson | 562 | 2015–16 2016–17 2017–18 2018–19 |
| 2 | Bimbo Coles | 547 | 1986–87 1987–88 1988–89 1989–90 |
| 3 | Malcolm Delaney | 543 | 2007–08 2008–09 2009–10 2010–11 |
| 4 | Jamon Gordon | 514 | 2003–04 2004–05 2005–06 2006–07 |
| 5 | Al Young | 468 | 1981–82 1982–83 1983–84 1984–85 |
| 6 | Devin Wilson | 414 | 2013–14 2014–15 2015–16 2017–18 |
| 7 | Dell Curry | 407 | 1982–83 1983–84 1984–85 1985–86 |
| 8 | Zabian Dowdell | 380 | 2003–04 2004–05 2005–06 2006–07 |
| 9 | Jay Purcell | 369 | 1990–91 1991–92 1992–93 1993–94 |
| 10 | Wabissa Bede | 351 | 2017–18 2018–19 2019–20 2020–21 |

Season
| Rk | Player | Assists | Season |
|---|---|---|---|
| 1 | Dave Sensibaugh | 192 | 1975–76 |
| 2 | Justin Robinson | 185 | 2017–18 |
| 3 | Wabissa Bede | 177 | 2019–20 |
| 4 | Bimbo Coles | 172 | 1987–88 |
| 5 | Justin Robinson | 160 | 2016–17 |
| 6 | Jamon Gordon | 154 | 2006–07 |
| 7 | Malcolm Delaney | 152 | 2008–09 |
| | Justyn Mutts | 152 | 2022–23 |
| 9 | Devin Wilson | 148 | 2013–14 |
| | Sean Pedulla | 148 | 2023–24 |

Single game
| Rk | Player | Assists | Season | Opponent |
|---|---|---|---|---|
| 1 | Justin Robinson | 13 | 2018–19 | Central Connecticut St. |
| 2 | Dave Sensibaugh | 12 | 1975–76 | Oregon |
| | Bimbo Coles | 12 | 1987–88 | Missouri |
| | Troy Manns | 12 | 1996–97 | St. Bonaventure |
| | Justin Robinson | 12 | 2017–18 | Boston College |

== Steals ==
Career
| Rk | Player | Steals | Seasons |
|---|---|---|---|
| 1 | Dell Curry | 295 | 1982–83 1983–84 1984–85 1985–86 |
| 2 | Jamon Gordon | 290 | 2003–04 2004–05 2005–06 2006–07 |
| 3 | Zabian Dowdell | 241 | 2003–04 2004–05 2005–06 2006–07 |
| 4 | Jeff Allen | 233 | 2007–08 2008–09 2009–10 2010–11 |
| 5 | Bimbo Coles | 216 | 1986–87 1987–88 1988–89 1989–90 |
| 6 | Al Young | 201 | 1981–82 1982–83 1983–84 1984–85 |
| 7 | Ace Custis | 199 | 1993–94 1994–95 1995–96 1996–97 |
| 8 | Reggie Steppe | 197 | 1979–80 1980–81 1981–82 1982–83 |
| 9 | Bryant Matthews | 184 | 2000–01 2001–02 2002–03 2003–04 |
| 10 | Carlos Dixon | 183 | 2000–01 2001–02 2002–03 2004–05 |

Season
| Rk | Player | Steals | Season |
|---|---|---|---|
| 1 | Jamon Gordon | 94 | 2006–07 |
| 2 | Dell Curry | 89 | 1983–84 |
| 3 | Dell Curry | 79 | 1985–86 |
| 4 | Bryant Matthews | 72 | 2003–04 |
| 5 | Al Young | 71 | 1984–85 |
| | Zabian Dowdell | 71 | 2006–07 |
| 7 | Bimbo Coles | 70 | 1989–90 |
| | Zabian Dowdell | 70 | 2005–06 |
| 9 | Dell Curry | 69 | 1984–85 |
| | Jeff Allen | 69 | 2007–08 |

Single game
| Rk | Player | Steals | Season | Opponent |
|---|---|---|---|---|
| 1 | Reggie Steppe | 8 | 1981–82 | Boston College |
| | Dell Curry | 8 | 1983–84 | Louisville |
| | Rod Wheeler | 8 | 1990–91 | VCU |
| | Jamon Gordon | 8 | 2003–04 | William & Mary |

== Blocks ==
Career
| Rk | Player | Blocks | Seasons |
|---|---|---|---|
| 1 | Roy Brow | 251 | 1984–85 1985–86 1986–87 1987–88 |
| 2 | Jimmy Carruth | 194 | 1990–91 1991–92 1992–93 1993–94 |
| 3 | Bobby Beecher | 170 | 1982–83 1983–84 1984–85 1985–86 |
| 4 | Rolan Roberts | 167 | 1997–98 1998–99 1999–00 |
| 5 | Jeff Allen | 150 | 2007–08 2008–09 2009–10 2010–11 |
| 6 | Cheick Diakite | 125 | 2005–06 2006–07 2007–08 2008–09 |
| 7 | Wayne Robinson | 119 | 1976–77 1977–78 1978–79 1979–80 |
| 8 | Deron Washington | 115 | 2004–05 2005–06 2006–07 2007–08 |
| 9 | Les Henson | 109 | 1976–77 1977–78 1978–79 1979–80 |
| 10 | John Rivers | 108 | 1988–89 1989–90 1990–91 1991–92 |

Season
| Rk | Player | Blocks | Season |
|---|---|---|---|
| 1 | Roy Brow | 100 | 1987–88 |
| 2 | Roy Brow | 86 | 1986–87 |
| 3 | Jimmy Carruth | 68 | 1993–94 |
| 4 | Rolan Roberts | 60 | 1997–98 |
| 5 | Zach LeDay | 58 | 2015–16 |
| 6 | Rolan Roberts | 57 | 1998–99 |
| | Bobby Beecher | 56 | 1982–83 |
| 8 | Joey van Zegeren | 53 | 2013–14 |
| 9 | Rolan Roberts | 50 | 1999–00 |
| 10 | Jimmy Carruth | 49 | 1992–93 |

Single game
| Rk | Player | Blocks | Season | Opponent |
|---|---|---|---|---|
| 1 | Roy Brow | 9 | 1986–87 | James Madison |
| | Roy Brow | 9 | 1987–88 | Baptist College, |
