= Milwaukee Bucks all-time roster =

American professional basketball team members

The following is a list of players, both past and current, who appeared at least in one game for the Milwaukee Bucks NBA franchise.

== Players ==
Note: Statistics were updated through the end of the 2025–26 season.

G	Guard	G/F	Guard-forward	F	Forward	F/C	Forward-center	C	Center

legend
^	Denotes player who has been inducted to the Naismith Memorial Basketball Hall of Fame
*	Denotes player who has been selected for at least one All-Star Game with the Milwaukee Bucks and is currently on the team roster
^{+}	Denotes player who has been selected for at least one All-Star Game with the Milwaukee Bucks
^{x}	Denotes player who is currently on the Milwaukee Bucks roster
0.0	Denotes the Milwaukee Bucks statistics leader (min. 100 games played for the team for per-game statistics)

=== A ===
All-time roster
Player	Pos.	Pre-draft team	Yrs	Seasons	Statistics									Ref.
Player	Pos.	Pre-draft team	Yrs	Seasons	GP	MP	REB	AST	PTS	MPG	RPG	APG	PPG	Ref.
Alaa Abdelnaby	F/C	Duke	1	1992–1993	12	159	37	10	64	13.3	3.1	0.8	5.3	
Zaid Abdul-Aziz	F/C	Iowa State	2	1968–1970	109	2,474	981	95	913	22.7	9.0	0.9	8.4	
Kareem Abdul-Jabbar (formerly Lew Alcindor)^ (#33)	C	UCLA	6	1969–1975	467	19,954	7,161	2,008	14,211	42.7	15.3	4.3	30.4	
Jaylen Adams	G	St. Bonaventure	1	2020–2021	7	18	3	2	2	2.6	0.4	0.3	0.3	
Jeff Adrien	F	UConn	1	2013–2014	28	705	218	31	305	25.2	7.8	1.1	10.9	
Joe Alexander	F	West Virginia	1	2008–2009	59	716	115	42	278	12.1	1.9	0.7	4.7	
Grayson Allen	G	Duke	2	2021–2023	138	3,777	459	263	1,483	27.4	3.3	1.9	10.7	
Lucius Allen	G	UCLA	5	1970–1975	303	8,901	1,007	1,347	4,185	29.4	3.3	4.4	13.8	
Malik Allen	F/C	Villanova	1	2008–2009	49	579	103	35	156	11.8	2.1	0.7	3.2	
Ray Allen^	G	UConn	7	1996–2003	494	17,945	2,260	1,861	9,681	36.3	4.6	3.8	19.6	
Rafer Alston	G	Fresno State	3	1999–2002	114	1,249	126	281	314	11.0	1.1	2.5	2.8	
Nate Ament^{x}	F	Tennessee	1	2026–2027										
Cadillac Anderson	F/C	Houston	2	1989–1991	86	1,538	448	27	599	17.9	5.2	0.3	7.0	
Alex Antetokounmpo	F	(Spain) UCAM Murcia	1	2025–2026	6	21	6	1	19	3.5	1.0	0.2	3.2	
Giannis Antetokounmpo^{+}	F	(Greece) Filathlitikos	13	2013–2026	895	29,273	8,882	4,484	21,531	32.7	9.9	5.0	24.1	
Thanasis Antetokounmpo	F	Delaware 87ers	6	2019–2024; 2025–2026	230	1,662	336	130	522	7.2	1.5	0.6	2.3	
Cole Anthony	G	North Carolina	1	2025–2026	35	527	87	121	234	15.1	2.5	3.5	6.7	
Greg Anthony	G	UNLV	1	2001–2002	24	553	44	79	172	23.0	1.8	3.3	7.2	
Nate Archibald^	G	UTEP	1	1983–1984	46	1,038	76	160	340	22.6	1.7	3.5	7.4	
John Arthurs	G	Tulane	1	1969–1970	11	86	14	17	35	7.8	1.3	1.5	3.2	
D. J. Augustin	G	Texas	1	2020–2021	37	713	50	110	227	19.3	1.4	3.0	6.1	
Anthony Avent	F	Seton Hall	2	1992–1994	115	2,980	666	124	1,051	25.9	5.8	1.1	9.1	
Gustavo Ayón	C	(Mexico) Halcones de Xalapa	1	2012–2013	12	163	59	12	51	13.6	4.9	1.0	4.3	

=== B ===
All-time roster
Player	Pos.	Pre-draft team	Yrs	Seasons	Statistics									Ref.
Player	Pos.	Pre-draft team	Yrs	Seasons	GP	MP	REB	AST	PTS	MPG	RPG	APG	PPG	Ref.
Vin Baker^{+}	F	Hartford	4	1993–1997	324	12,399	3,079	882	5,922	38.3	9.5	2.7	18.3	
Earl Barron	C	Memphis	1	2010–2011	7	85	22	4	36	12.1	3.1	0.6	5.1	
Jon Barry	G	Georgia Tech	3	1992–1995	171	2,396	238	321	842	14.0	1.4	1.9	4.9	
Jerryd Bayless	G	Arizona	2	2014–2016	129	3,222	352	396	1,139	25.0	2.7	3.1	8.8	
Malik Beasley	G	Florida State	1	2023–2024	79	2,337	290	108	889	29.6	3.7	1.4	11.3	
Michael Beasley	F	Kansas State	1	2016–2017	56	935	193	53	528	16.7	3.4	0.9	9.4	
MarJon Beauchamp	F	Yakima Valley	3	2022–2025	126	1,431	246	74	529	11.4	2.0	0.6	4.2	
Charlie Bell	G	Michigan State	5	2005–2010	350	9,153	791	842	3,164	26.2	2.3	2.4	9.0	
DeAndre' Bembry	G/F	Saint Joseph's	1	2021–2022	8	77	11	6	6	9.6	0.8	1.4	0.8	
Dragan Bender	F	(Israel) Maccabi Tel Aviv	1	2019–2020	7	91	20	9	26	13.0	2.9	1.3	3.7	
Benoit Benjamin	C	Creighton	1	1995–1996	70	1,492	436	48	547	21.3	6.2	0.7	7.8	
Kent Benson	C	Indiana	3	1977–1980	207	4,809	1,212	430	2,030	23.2	5.9	2.1	9.8	
Del Beshore	G	California (PA)	1	1978–1979	1	1	0	0	0	1.0	0.0	0.0	0.0	
Patrick Beverley	G	Arkansas	1	2023–2024	26	543	94	68	157	20.9	3.6	2.6	6.0	
Steve Blake	G	Maryland	1	2006–2007	33	583	45	84	120	17.7	1.4	2.5	3.6	
Eric Bledsoe	G	Kentucky	3	2017–2020	210	6,157	921	1,119	3,418	29.3	4.4	5.3	16.3	
John Block	F/C	USC	1	1971–1972	79	1,524	410	95	672	19.3	5.2	1.2	8.5	
Keith Bogans	G/F	Kentucky	1	2008–2009	29	485	91	33	175	16.7	3.1	1.1	6.0	
Andrew Bogut	C	Utah	7	2005–2012	408	13,340	3,810	950	5,179	32.7	9.3	2.3	12.7	
Marques Bolden	C	Duke	1	2023–2024	2	3	2	0	0	1.5	1.0	0.0	0.0	
Joel Bolomboy	F	Weber State	1	2017–2018	6	38	10	0	9	6.3	1.7	0.0	1.5	
Calvin Booth	C	Penn State	1	2004–2005	17	189	49	4	42	11.1	2.9	0.2	2.5	
Bob Boozer	F	Kansas State	1	1970–1971	80	1,775	435	128	728	22.2	5.4	1.6	9.1	
Jamaree Bouyea	G	San Francisco	1	2024–2025	5	62	5	10	17	12.4	1.0	2.0	3.4	
Earl Boykins	G	Eastern Michigan	2	2006–2007; 2010–2011	92	2,016	131	300	897	21.9	1.4	3.3	9.8	
Dudley Bradley	G/F	North Carolina	2	1986–1988	70	905	103	67	212	12.9	1.5	1.0	3.0	
Terrell Brandon	G	Oregon	2	1997–1999	65	2,289	229	491	1,044	35.2	3.5	7.6	16.1	
Tim Breaux	F	Wyoming	1	1997–1998	6	30	2	2	10	5.0	0.3	0.3	1.7	
Randy Breuer	C	Minnesota	7	1983–1990	452	8,139	1,986	356	3,238	18.0	4.4	0.8	7.2	
Primož Brezec	C	(Slovenia) Union Olimpija	1	2009–2010	14	59	13	1	14	4.2	0.9	0.1	1.0	
Frank Brickowski	F/C	Penn State	4	1990–1994	249	6,984	1,454	614	3,450	28.0	5.8	2.5	13.9	
Junior Bridgeman (#2)	G/F	Louisville	10	1975–1984; 1986–1987	711	18,054	2,642	1,787	9,892	25.4	3.7	2.5	13.9	
Jon Brockman	F	Washington	2	2010–2012	98	916	259	27	173	9.3	2.6	0.3	1.8	
Malcolm Brogdon	G	Virginia	3	2016–2019	187	5,250	657	674	2,393	28.1	3.5	3.6	12.8	
Gary Brokaw	G	Notre Dame	3	1974–1977	189	3,998	336	578	1,592	21.2	1.8	3.1	8.4	
Chucky Brown	F	NC State	1	1996–1997	60	674	132	24	170	11.2	2.2	0.4	2.8	
Sterling Brown	G	SMU	3	2017–2020	164	2,577	510	160	855	15.7	3.1	1.0	5.2	
Tony Brown	G/F	Arkansas	2	1988–1990	90	909	101	62	311	10.1	1.1	0.7	3.5	
Elijah Bryant	G	BYU	1	2020–2021	1	32	6	3	16	32.0	6.0	3.0	16.0	
Quinn Buckner	G	Indiana	6	1976–1982	461	12,154	1,507	2,391	4,738	26.4	3.3	5.2	10.3	
Brayden Burries^{x}	G	Arizona	1	2026–2027										
Caron Butler	F	UConn	1	2013–2014	34	821	158	56	374	24.1	4.6	1.6	11.0	

=== C ===
All-time roster
Player	Pos.	Pre-draft team	Yrs	Seasons	Statistics									Ref.
Player	Pos.	Pre-draft team	Yrs	Seasons	GP	MP	REB	AST	PTS	MPG	RPG	APG	PPG	Ref.
Jason Caffey	F	Alabama	3	2000–2003	144	2,637	579	103	894	18.3	4.0	0.7	6.2	
Isaiah Canaan	G	Murray State	1	2018–2019	4	31	4	3	6	7.8	1.0	0.8	1.5	
Jimmy Carruth	F/C	Virginia Tech	1	1996–1997	4	21	4	0	5	5.3	1.0	0.0	1.3	
Fred Carter	G/F	Mount St. Mary's	1	1976–1977	47	875	93	104	390	18.6	2.0	2.2	8.3	
Jevon Carter	G	West Virginia	2	2021–2023	101	2,163	245	247	763	21.4	2.4	2.4	7.6	
Michael Carter-Williams	G	Syracuse	2	2014–2016	79	2,407	375	421	976	30.5	4.7	5.3	12.4	
Sam Cassell	G	Florida State	5	1998–2003	313	11,012	1,254	2,269	5,939	35.2	4.0	7.2	19.0	
Harvey Catchings	F/C	Hardin–Simmons	5	1979–1984	372	7,314	1,918	398	1,175	19.7	5.2	1.1	3.2	
Len Chappell	F/C	Wake Forest	2	1968–1970	155	3,341	913	151	1,789	21.6	5.9	1.0	11.5	
Ben Coleman	F	Maryland	1	1989–1990	22	305	87	12	126	13.9	4.0	0.5	5.7	
Amir Coffey	G	Minnesota	1	2025–2026	30	265	26	11	72	8.8	0.9	0.4	2.4	
Don Collins	G/F	Washington State	1	1986–1987	6	57	15	2	25	9.5	2.5	0.3	4.2	
Bonzie Colson	F	Notre Dame	1	2018–2019	8	98	30	3	39	12.3	3.8	0.4	4.9	
Marty Conlon	F/C	Providence	2	1994–1996	156	3,022	603	178	1,210	19.4	3.9	1.1	7.8	
Pat Connaughton	G	Notre Dame	7	2018–2025	440	9,492	1,778	700	3,004	21.6	4.0	1.6	6.8	
Lester Conner	G	Oregon State	2	1990–1992	120	1,939	239	401	402	16.2	2.0	3.3	3.4	
Anthony Cook	F/C	Arizona	1	1993–1994	23	201	56	4	62	8.7	2.4	0.2	2.7	
Chris Copeland	F	Colorado	1	2015–2016	24	156	10	11	50	6.5	0.4	0.5	2.1	
Joe Courtney	F	Southern Miss	1	1993–1994	19	177	29	6	65	9.3	1.5	0.3	3.4	
DeMarcus Cousins	C	Kentucky	1	2021–2022	17	287	98	18	154	16.9	5.8	1.1	9.1	
Dave Cowens^	F/C	Florida State	1	1982–1983	40	1,014	274	82	324	25.4	6.9	2.1	8.1	
Freddie Crawford	G/F	St. Bonaventure	1	1969–1970	77	1,331	184	225	587	17.3	2.4	2.9	7.6	
Charlie Criss	G	New Mexico State	2	1982–1984	72	1,029	88	144	442	14.3	1.2	2.0	6.1	
Geoff Crompton	C	North Carolina	1	1981–1982	35	203	41	13	28	5.8	1.2	0.4	0.8	
Austin Croshere	F	Providence	1	2008–2009	11	77	24	6	36	7.0	2.2	0.5	3.3	
Torrey Craig	F	USC Upstate	1	2020–2021	18	201	43	16	45	11.2	2.4	0.9	2.5	
Jae Crowder	F	Marquette	2	2022–2024	68	1,496	230	93	436	22.0	3.4	1.4	6.4	
Pat Cummings	F/C	Cincinnati	3	1979–1982	223	3,116	775	214	1,568	14.0	3.5	1.0	7.0	
Terry Cummings^{+}	F	DePaul	6	1984–1989; 1995–1996	480	15,391	3,758	1,118	9,290	32.1	7.8	2.3	19.4	
Dick Cunningham	C	Murray State	6	1968–1972; 1972–1975	295	3,072	1,081	164	841	10.4	3.7	0.6	2.9	
Jared Cunningham	G	Oregon State	1	2015–2016	4	55	9	1	16	13.8	2.3	0.3	4.0	
Dell Curry	G	Virginia Tech	1	1998–1999	42	864	85	48	423	20.6	2.0	1.1	10.1	
Michael Curry	G/F	Georgia Southern	2	1997–1999	132	3,124	206	215	787	23.7	1.6	1.6	6.0	

=== D ===
All-time roster
Player	Pos.	Pre-draft team	Yrs	Seasons	Statistics									Ref.
Player	Pos.	Pre-draft team	Yrs	Seasons	GP	MP	REB	AST	PTS	MPG	RPG	APG	PPG	Ref.
Samuel Dalembert	C	Seton Hall	1	2012–2013	47	765	276	21	313	16.3	5.9	0.4	6.7	
Bob Dandridge^ (#10)	G/F	Norfolk State	9	1969–1977; 1981–1982	618	22,094	4,497	1,956	11,478	35.8	7.3	3.2	18.6	
Marquis Daniels	G/F	Auburn	1	2012–2013	59	1,085	150	65	324	18.4	2.5	1.1	5.5	
Adrian Dantley^	G/F	Notre Dame	1	1990–1991	10	126	13	9	57	12.6	1.3	0.9	5.7	
Charles Davis	F	Vanderbilt	3	1984–1986; 1987–1988	119	1,658	322	108	803	13.9	2.7	0.9	6.7	
Josh Davis	F	Wyoming	1	2005–2006	4	12	3	1	2	3.0	0.8	0.3	0.5	
Mark Davis	G/F	Old Dominion	1	1988–1989	31	251	36	14	123	8.1	1.2	0.5	4.0	
Mickey Davis	G/F	Duquesne	5	1972–1977	286	3,711	800	295	1,478	13.0	2.8	1.0	5.2	
Todd Day	G/F	Arkansas	4	1992–1996	237	6,946	945	394	3,332	29.3	4.0	1.7	14.1	
Vinny Del Negro	G	NC State	2	1998–2000	115	2,304	209	334	630	20.0	1.8	2.9	5.5	
Javin DeLaurier	C	Duke	1	2021–2022	1	3	1	0	0	3.0	1.0	0.0	0.0	
Carlos Delfino	G	(Italy) Fortitudo Bologna	3	2009–2012	178	5,406	802	437	1,878	30.4	4.5	2.5	10.6	
Matthew Dellavedova	G	Saint Mary's	3	2016–2019	126	2,795	221	531	761	22.2	1.8	4.2	6.0	
Mamadi Diakite	F	Virginia	1	2020–2021	14	141	34	8	44	10.1	2.4	0.6	3.1	
Ousmane Dieng^{x}	C	New Zealand Breakers	1	2025–2026	30	804	138	108	331	26.8	4.6	3.6	11.0	
Bill Dinwiddie	F	New Mexico Highlands	1	1971–1972	23	144	32	9	37	6.3	1.4	0.4	1.6	
Donte DiVincenzo	G	Villanova	4	2018–2022	176	4,086	495	262	1,462	26.1	3.6	2.6	11.2	
Keyon Dooling	G	Missouri	1	2010–2011	80	1,757	117	243	571	22.0	1.5	3.0	7.1	
Sherman Douglas	G	Syracuse	2	1995–1997	148	4,417	350	824	1,556	29.8	2.4	5.6	10.5	
Chris Douglas-Roberts	G	Memphis	1	2010–2011	44	884	88	50	323	20.1	2.0	1.1	7.3	
Jeff Dowtin	G	Rhode Island	1	2021–2022	1	3	0	0	0	3.0	0.0	0.0	0.0	
Goran Dragić	G	(Slovenia) Union Olimpija	1	2022–2023	7	83	12	12	39	11.9	1.7	1.7	5.6	
Terry Driscoll	F	Boston College	3	1972–1975	134	1,708	512	112	536	12.7	3.8	0.8	4.0	
Kevin Duckworth	C	Eastern Illinois	1	1995–1996	8	58	7	2	9	7.3	0.9	0.3	1.1	
Jared Dudley	G/F	Boston College	1	2014–2015	72	1,717	220	130	518	23.8	3.1	1.8	7.2	
Mike Dunleavy Sr.	G	South Carolina	4	1983–1985; 1988–1990	43	885	61	173	380	20.6	1.4	4.0	8.8	
Mike Dunleavy Jr.	G/F	Duke	2	2011–2013	130	3,388	495	262	1,462	26.1	3.8	2.0	11.2	
Trevon Duval	G	Duke	1	2018–2019	3	6	1	2	5	2.0	0.3	0.7	1.7	

=== E to F ===
All-time roster
Player	Pos.	Pre-draft team	Yrs	Seasons	Statistics									Ref.
Player	Pos.	Pre-draft team	Yrs	Seasons	GP	MP	REB	AST	PTS	MPG	RPG	APG	PPG	Ref.
Jim Eakins	C	BYU	1	1977–1978	17	155	29	12	49	9.1	1.7	0.7	2.9	
Acie Earl	F/C	Iowa	1	1996–1997	9	43	11	2	26	4.8	1.2	0.2	2.9	
Blue Edwards	G/F	East Carolina	2	1992–1994	164	5,051	711	385	2,335	30.8	4.3	2.3	14.2	
Dale Ellis	G/F	Tennessee	3	1990–1992; 1999–2000	120	3,139	368	141	1,801	26.2	3.1	1.2	15.0	
Monta Ellis	G	Lanier HS (MS)	2	2011–2013	103	3,831	389	619	1,947	37.2	3.8	6.0	18.9	
Len Elmore	F/C	Maryland	1	1980–1981	72	925	208	69	206	12.8	2.9	1.0	2.9	
Francisco Elson	C	California	2	2008–2010	70	1,039	242	34	210	14.8	3.5	0.5	3.0	
Wayne Embry^	F/C	Miami (OH)	1	1968–1969	78	2,355	672	149	1,023	30.2	8.6	1.9	13.1	
Chris Engler	C	Wyoming	2	1984–1985; 1986–1987	6	51	17	3	7	8.5	2.8	0.5	1.2	
Alex English^	F	South Carolina	2	1976–1978	142	2,200	563	154	1,100	15.5	4.0	1.1	7.7	
Tyler Ennis	G	Syracuse	2	2014–2016	71	1,007	103	154	305	14.2	1.5	2.2	4.3	
Mike Evans	G	Kansas State	2	1980–1982	85	1,107	99	189	376	13.0	1.2	2.2	4.4	
Jamie Feick	C	Michigan State	2	1997–1999	47	453	126	16	102	9.6	2.7	0.3	2.2	
Kenny Fields	G/F	UCLA	3	1984–1987	133	1,677	289	118	707	12.6	2.2	0.9	5.3	
Marcus Fizer	F	Iowa State	1	2004–2005	54	903	175	64	336	16.7	3.2	1.2	6.2	
Bryn Forbes	G	Michigan State	1	2020–2021	70	1,354	112	45	701	19.3	1.6	0.6	10.0	
Phil Ford	G	North Carolina	1	1982–1983	70	1,447	96	252	477	20.7	1.4	3.6	6.8	
T. J. Ford	G	Texas	2	2003–2004; 2005–2006	127	4,029	488	829	1,269	31.7	3.8	6.5	10.0	
Greg Foster	F/C	UTEP	2	1993–1994; 2001–2002	9	43	11	1	17	4.8	1.2	0.1	1.9	
Jim Fox	F/C	South Carolina	1	1975–1976	70	918	235	42	272	13.1	3.4	0.6	3.9	
Tim Frazier	G	Penn State	1	2018–2019	12	211	31	42	75	17.6	2.6	3.5	6.3	
Gary Freeman	F	Oregon State	1	1970–1971	41	335	98	31	152	8.2	2.4	0.8	3.7	

=== G ===
All-time roster
Player	Pos.	Pre-draft team	Yrs	Seasons	Statistics									Ref.
Player	Pos.	Pre-draft team	Yrs	Seasons	GP	MP	REB	AST	PTS	MPG	RPG	APG	PPG	Ref.
Dan Gadzuric	C	UCLA	8	2002–2010	483	7,317	2,186	182	2,347	15.1	4.5	0.4	4.9	
Reece Gaines	G	Louisville	2	2004–2006	23	133	3	7	28	5.8	0.1	0.3	1.2	
Danilo Gallinari	F	(Italy) Olimpia Milano	1	2023–2024	17	155	18	12	47	9.1	1.1	0.7	2.8	
Langston Galloway	G	Saint Joseph's	1	2021–2022	3	49	10	7	2	16.3	3.3	2.3	0.7	
Dave Gambee	F	Oregon State	1	1968–1969	34	624	179	32	410	18.4	5.3	0.9	12.1	
Dick Garrett	G	Southern Illinois	1	1973–1974	15	87	14	9	27	5.8	0.9	0.6	1.8	
Rowland Garrett	F	Florida State	1	1976–1977	33	383	72	20	155	11.6	2.2	0.6	4.7	
Pau Gasol^	F/C	(Spain) FC Barcelona	1	2018–2019	3	30	10	2	4	10.0	3.3	0.7	1.3	
Chris Gatling	F/C	Old Dominion	1	1998–1999	30	494	114	20	188	16.5	3.8	0.7	6.3	
Tate George	G	UConn	1	1994–1995	3	8	1	0	4	2.7	0.3	0.0	1.3	
John Gianelli	F/C	Pacific	2	1977–1979	164	4,384	917	352	1,277	26.7	5.6	2.1	7.8	
Eddie Gill	G	Weber State	1	2008–2009	6	43	4	11	14	7.2	0.7	1.8	2.3	
Kendall Gill	G	Illinois	1	2004–2005	14	284	37	27	85	20.3	2.6	1.9	6.1	
Armen Gilliam	F/C	UNLV	3	1996–1999	196	4,832	1,062	176	1,893	24.7	5.4	0.9	9.7	
Mike Glenn	G	Southern Illinois	2	1985–1987	42	607	59	40	250	14.5	1.4	1.0	6.0	
Mike Gminski	C	Duke	1	1993–1994	8	54	15	0	13	6.8	1.9	0.0	1.6	
Anthony Goldwire	G	Houston	1	2004–2005	24	482	51	78	154	20.1	2.1	3.3	6.4	
Drew Gooden	F	Kansas	3	2010–2013	107	2,480	632	197	1,214	23.2	5.9	1.8	11.3	
Paul Grant	C	Wisconsin	1	1998–1999	2	5	0	0	2	2.5	0.0	0.0	1.0	
Jeff Grayer	G/F	Iowa State	4	1988–1992	246	4,708	755	402	1,889	19.1	3.1	1.6	7.7	
Bob Greacen	F	Rutgers	2	1969–1971	43	335	65	40	111	7.8	1.5	0.9	2.6	
A. J. Green^{x}	G	Northern Iowa	4	2022–2026	242	4,888	496	312	1,756	20.2	2.0	1.3	7.3	
Litterial Green	G	Georgia	1	1997–1998	21	124	7	16	25	5.9	0.3	0.8	1.2	
Rickey Green	G	Michigan	1	1988–1989	30	501	46	105	163	16.7	1.5	3.5	5.4	
Lynn Greer	G	Temple	1	2006–2007	41	432	27	53	167	10.5	0.7	1.3	4.1	
Gary Gregor	F/C	South Carolina	1	1972–1973	9	88	32	9	27	9.8	3.6	1.0	3.0	
Kevin Grevey	G/F	Kentucky	2	1983–1985	142	2,105	184	169	922	14.8	1.3	1.2	6.5	
Ernie Grunfeld	G/F	Tennessee	2	1977–1979	155	3,039	554	361	1,345	19.6	3.6	2.3	8.7	
Jorge Gutiérrez	G	California	1	2014–2015	10	131	18	15	37	13.1	1.8	1.5	3.7	

=== H ===
All-time roster
Player	Pos.	Pre-draft team	Yrs	Seasons	Statistics									Ref.
Player	Pos.	Pre-draft team	Yrs	Seasons	GP	MP	REB	AST	PTS	MPG	RPG	APG	PPG	Ref.
Marcus Haislip	F	Tennessee	2	2002–2004	70	704	106	13	254	10.1	1.5	0.2	3.6	
Darvin Ham	F	Texas Tech	3	1999–2002	134	2,540	495	140	589	19.0	3.7	1.0	4.4	
Zendon Hamilton	F/C	St. John's	1	2004–2005	16	159	42	6	51	9.9	2.6	0.4	3.2	
Darrin Hancock	G/F	Kansas	1	1996–1997	9	39	5	4	4	4.3	0.6	0.4	0.4	
Gary Harris	G	Michigan State	1	2025–2026	48	661	61	51	128	13.8	1.3	1.1	2.7	
Tobias Harris	F	Tennessee	2	2011–2013	70	804	158	35	344	11.5	2.3	0.5	4.9	
Jason Hart	G	Syracuse	1	2000–2001	1	10	0	1	2	10.0	0.0	1.0	2.0	
Spencer Hawes	F/C	Washington	1	2016–2017	19	171	45	19	83	9.0	2.4	1.0	4.4	
Cedric Henderson	F	Georgia	1	1986–1987	2	6	5	0	6	3.0	2.5	0.0	3.0	
Gerald Henderson	G	VCU	1	1989–1990	11	129	12	13	27	11.7	1.1	1.2	2.5	
Jerome Henderson	F/C	New Mexico	1	1986–1987	6	36	7	0	12	6.0	1.2	0.0	2.0	
Conner Henry	G	UC Santa Barbara	1	1987–1988	14	145	19	29	32	10.4	1.4	2.1	2.3	
John Henson	F/C	North Carolina	7	2012–2019	405	8,152	2,206	442	3,162	20.1	5.4	1.1	7.8	
Steve Henson	G	Kansas State	2	1990–1992	118	1,076	92	213	364	9.1	0.8	1.8	3.1	
Tyler Herro^{x}	G	Kentucky	1	2026–2027										
Fred Hetzel	F/C	Davidson	1	1968–1969	53	1,591	473	83	843	30.0	8.9	1.6	15.9	
George Hill	G	IUPUI	4	2018–2020; 2021–2023	195	4,150	520	488	1,381	21.3	2.7	2.5	7.1	
Tyrone Hill	F	Xavier	2	1997–1999	74	2,581	742	105	717	34.9	10.0	1.4	9.7	
Darington Hobson	G	New Mexico	1	2011–2012	5	39	3	6	4	7.8	0.6	1.2	0.8	
Julius Hodge	G	NC State	1	2006–2007	5	28	5	2	9	5.6	1.0	0.4	1.8	
Craig Hodges	G	Long Beach State	4	1984–1988	269	7,365	489	927	2,830	27.4	1.8	3.4	10.5	
Jrue Holiday^{+}	G	UCLA	3	2020–2023	193	6,298	910	1,309	3,561	32.6	4.7	6.8	18.5	
Brad Holland	G	UCLA	1	1981–1982	1	9	0	2	0	9.0	0.0	2.0	0.0	
Jerald Honeycutt	G/F	Tulane	2	1997–1999	41	542	94	33	250	13.2	2.3	0.8	6.1	
Rodney Hood	G	Duke	1	2021–2022	39	581	67	30	129	14.9	1.7	0.8	3.3	
Dave Hoppen	F/C	Nebraska	1	1987–1988	3	35	7	2	11	11.7	2.3	0.7	3.7	
Tito Horford	C	Miami (FL)	2	1988–1990	60	348	81	5	93	5.8	1.4	0.1	1.6	
Eddie House	G	Arizona State	1	2004–2005	5	41	3	5	16	8.2	0.6	1.0	3.2	
Otis Howard	F	Austin Peay	1	1978–1979	3	22	7	1	10	7.3	2.3	0.3	3.3	
Kim Hughes	C	Wisconsin	1	1980–1981	45	331	77	24	32	7.4	1.7	0.5	0.7	
Jay Humphries	G	Colorado	5	1987–1992	323	10,277	885	1,922	4,336	31.8	2.7	6.0	13.4	
Lindsey Hunter	G	Jackson State	1	2000–2001	82	2,002	169	222	825	24.4	2.1	2.7	10.1	

=== I ===
All-time roster
Player	Pos.	Pre-draft team	Yrs	Seasons	Statistics									Ref.
Player	Pos.	Pre-draft team	Yrs	Seasons	GP	MP	REB	AST	PTS	MPG	RPG	APG	PPG	Ref.
Serge Ibaka	F/C	(Spain) L'Hospitalet	2	2021–2023	35	524	144	17	199	15.0	4.1	0.5	5.7	
Ersan İlyasova	F	(Turkey) Ülkerspor	9	2006–2007; 2009–2015; 2018–2020	583	13,057	3,343	606	5,711	22.4	5.7	1.0	9.8	
Joe Ingles	F	(Australia) South Dragons	1	2022–2023	46	1,044	128	150	317	22.7	2.8	3.3	6.9	
Damien Inglis	F	(France) Chorale Roanne	1	2015–2016	20	156	31	10	36	7.8	1.6	0.5	1.8	
Royal Ivey	G	Texas	2	2007–2008; 2009–2010	93	1,527	126	170	441	16.4	1.4	1.8	4.7	

=== J ===
All-time roster
Player	Pos.	Pre-draft team	Yrs	Seasons	Statistics									Ref.
Player	Pos.	Pre-draft team	Yrs	Seasons	GP	MP	REB	AST	PTS	MPG	RPG	APG	PPG	Ref.
Andre Jackson Jr.	G	UConn	3	2023–2026	172	1,960	367	176	468	11.4	2.1	1.0	2.7	
Darnell Jackson	F	Kansas	1	2009–2010	1	9	2	0	2	9.0	2.0	0.0	2.0	
Jermaine Jackson	G	Detroit Mercy	1	2005–2006	30	202	27	25	35	6.7	0.9	0.8	1.2	
Justin Jackson	F	North Carolina	1	2020–2021	1	33	6	1	9	33.0	6.0	1.0	9.0	
Stephen Jackson	G/F	Butler CC	1	2011–2012	26	712	82	77	274	27.4	3.2	3.0	10.5	
Kasparas Jakučionis^{x}	G	Illinois	1	2026–2027										
Mike James	G	Duquesne	1	2004–2005	47	1,167	122	185	535	24.8	2.6	3.9	11.4	
Jaime Jaquez Jr.^{x}	G	UCLA	1	2026–2027										
Richard Jefferson	F	Arizona	1	2008–2009	82	2,939	374	199	1,607	35.8	4.6	2.4	19.6	
Brandon Jennings	G	Oak Hill Academy (VA)	5	2009–2013; 2017–2018	305	10,273	1,019	1,705	5,019	33.7	3.3	5.6	16.5	
AJ Johnson	G	SoCal Academy (CA)	1	2024–2025	7	44	7	7	20	6.3	1.0	1.0	2.9	
Ervin Johnson	C	New Orleans	7	1997–2003; 2005–2006	461	10,309	3,050	215	1,929	22.4	6.6	0.5	4.2	
George Johnson	F/C	St. John's	1	1978–1979	67	1,157	360	81	414	17.3	5.4	1.2	6.2	
Marques Johnson^{+} (#8)	G/F	UCLA	7	1977–1984	524	18,240	3,923	1,934	10,980	34.8	7.5	3.7	21.0	
Mickey Johnson	F	Aurora	3	1980–1983	164	4,205	1,024	512	2,068	25.6	6.2	3.1	12.6	
Damon Jones	G	Houston	2	2003–2004; 2008–2009	100	2,124	176	485	606	21.2	1.8	4.9	6.1	
Earl Jones	C	District of Columbia	1	1985–1986	12	43	10	4	13	3.6	0.8	0.3	1.1	
Terrence Jones	F	Kentucky	1	2016–2017	3	6	3	0	0	2.0	1.0	0.0	0.0	
Wali Jones	G	Villanova	2	1971–1973	75	1,449	104	197	496	19.3	1.4	2.6	6.6	
Adonis Jordan	G	Kansas	1	1998–1999	4	18	0	3	6	4.5	0.0	0.8	1.5	

=== K ===
All-time roster
Player	Pos.	Pre-draft team	Yrs	Seasons	Statistics									Ref.
Player	Pos.	Pre-draft team	Yrs	Seasons	GP	MP	REB	AST	PTS	MPG	RPG	APG	PPG	Ref.
Georgios Kalaitzakis	F	(Greece) Panathinaikos	1	2021–2022	9	48	8	0	16	5.3	0.9	0.0	1.8	
Jerome Kersey	F	Longwood	1	2000–2001	22	243	45	15	72	11.0	2.0	0.7	3.3	
Randolph Keys	G/F	Southern Miss	1	1995–1996	69	816	125	65	232	11.8	1.8	0.9	3.4	
Sean Kilpatrick	G	Cincinnati	1	2017–2018	23	205	25	15	93	8.9	1.1	0.7	4.0	
Toby Kimball	F/C	UConn	1	1971–1972	74	971	312	60	258	13.1	4.2	0.8	3.5	
Brandon Knight	G	Kentucky	2	2013–2015	124	4,088	476	633	2,214	33.0	3.8	5.1	17.9	
Brevin Knight	G	Stanford	1	2003–2004	21	420	48	98	123	20.0	2.3	4.7	5.9	
Frank Kornet	F	Vanderbilt	2	1989–1991	89	595	95	30	171	6.7	1.1	0.3	1.9	
Luke Kornet	C	Vanderbilt	1	2021–2022	1	3	1	0	0	3.0	1.0	0.0	0.0	
Kyle Korver	G	Creighton	1	2019–2020	58	960	122	68	386	16.6	2.1	1.2	6.7	
Larry Krystkowiak	F/C	Montana	4	1987–1990; 1991–1992	225	5,751	1,346	296	2,202	25.6	6.0	1.3	9.8	
Steve Kuberski	F/C	Bradley	1	1974–1975	59	517	123	35	168	8.8	2.1	0.6	2.8	
Toni Kukoč^	F	(Socialist Federal Republic of Yugoslavia) Jugoplastika	4	2002–2006	254	5,343	847	729	1,959	21.0	3.3	2.9	7.7	
Rodions Kurucs	F	(Spain) FC Barcelona	1	2020–2021	5	34	9	4	15	6.8	1.8	0.8	3.0	
Kyle Kuzma^{x}	F	Utah	2	2024–2026	102	2,855	498	257	1,374	28.0	4.9	2.5	13.5	

=== L ===
All-time roster
Player	Pos.	Pre-draft team	Yrs	Seasons	Statistics									Ref.
Player	Pos.	Pre-draft team	Yrs	Seasons	GP	MP	REB	AST	PTS	MPG	RPG	APG	PPG	Ref.
Doron Lamb	G	Kentucky	1	2012–2013	23	280	17	20	78	12.2	0.7	0.9	3.4	
Jeff Lamp	G/F	Virginia	1	1985–1986	44	701	121	64	276	15.9	2.8	1.5	6.3	
Jerome Lane	F	Pittsburgh	1	1991–1992	2	6	4	0	3	3.0	2.0	0.0	1.5	
Andrew Lang	C	Arkansas	2	1996–1998	109	1,886	431	41	426	17.3	4.0	0.4	3.9	
Dan Langhi	F	Vanderbilt	1	2003–2004	2	20	1	0	7	10.0	0.5	0.0	3.5	
Bob Lanier^ (#16)	C	St. Bonaventure	5	1979–1984	278	7,463	1,635	751	3,760	26.8	5.9	2.7	13.5	
Rich Laurel	G	Hofstra	1	1977–1978	10	57	10	3	24	5.7	1.0	0.3	2.4	
Russ Lee	G/F	Marshall	2	1972–1974	82	443	83	58	217	5.4	1.0	0.7	2.6	
Meyers Leonard	C	Illinois	1	2022–2023	9	114	34	1	43	12.7	3.8	0.1	4.8	
Jon Leuer	F	Wisconsin	1	2011–2012	46	555	120	25	218	12.1	2.6	0.5	4.7	
Caris LeVert^{x}	G	Michigan	1	2026–2027										
DeAndre Liggins	G	Kentucky	1	2017–2018	31	480	49	27	57	15.5	1.6	0.9	1.8	
Damian Lillard^{+}	G	Weber State	2	2023–2024	131	4,672	592	918	3,222	35.7	4.5	7.0	24.6	
Alton Lister	F/C	Arizona State	7	1981–1986; 1994–1996	471	9,793	3,062	549	3,433	20.8	6.5	1.2	7.3	
Chris Livingston	F	Kentucky	2	2023–2025	42	196	56	10	56	4.7	1.3	0.2	1.3	
Shaun Livingston	G	Peoria HS (IL)	1	2011–2012	58	1,092	123	122	318	18.8	2.1	2.1	5.5	
Scott Lloyd	F/C	Arizona State	2	1976–1978	83	1,137	236	42	431	13.7	2.8	0.5	5.2	
Brad Lohaus	F/C	Iowa	5	1989–1994	350	6,381	1,180	444	2,352	18.2	3.4	1.3	6.7	
Brook Lopez	C	Stanford	7	2018–2025	469	13,669	2,438	622	6,112	29.1	5.2	1.3	13.0	
Robin Lopez	C	Stanford	2	2019–2020; 2023–2024	82	1,023	166	49	375	12.5	2.0	0.6	4.6	
Bob Love	F	Southern	1	1968–1969	14	227	64	3	107	16.2	4.6	0.2	7.6	
Charlie Lowery	G	Puget Sound	1	1971–1972	20	134	19	14	45	6.7	1.0	0.7	2.3	
John Lucas II	G	Maryland	2	1986–1988	124	3,124	284	682	1,496	25.2	2.3	5.5	12.1	
Tyronn Lue	G	Nebraska	1	2008–2009	30	392	35	46	141	13.1	1.2	1.5	4.7	

=== M ===
All-time roster
Player	Pos.	Pre-draft team	Yrs	Seasons	Statistics									Ref.
Player	Pos.	Pre-draft team	Yrs	Seasons	GP	MP	REB	AST	PTS	MPG	RPG	APG	PPG	Ref.
Corey Maggette	F	Duke	1	2010–2011	67	1,401	241	84	805	20.9	3.6	1.3	12.0	
Jamaal Magloire	C	Kentucky	1	2005–2006	82	2,465	778	56	752	30.1	9.5	0.7	9.2	
Thon Maker	F/C	Orangeville Prep (CAN)	3	2016–2019	166	2,209	435	87	746	13.3	2.6	0.5	4.5	
Moses Malone^	F/C	Petersburg HS (VA)	2	1991–1993	93	2,615	790	100	1,329	28.1	8.5	1.1	14.3	
Sandro Mamukelashvili	C	Seton Hall	2	2021–2023	65	624	138	38	211	9.6	2.1	0.6	3.2	
Danny Manning	F/C	Kansas	1	1999–2000	72	1,217	208	73	333	16.9	2.9	1.0	4.6	
Pace Mannion	G	Utah	1	1987–1988	35	477	51	55	123	13.6	1.5	1.6	3.5	
Damir Markota	C	(Croatia) Cibona	1	2006–2007	30	170	31	6	51	5.7	1.0	0.2	1.7	
Bogoljub Marković^{x}	F	(Serbia and Montenegro) Mega Basket	1	2026–2027										
Kendall Marshall	G	North Carolina	1	2014–2015	28	417	28	86	118	14.9	1.0	3.1	4.2	
Cuonzo Martin	G/F	Purdue	1	1996–1997	3	13	1	1	0	4.3	0.3	0.3	0.0	
Kenyon Martin	F	Cincinnati	1	2014–2015	11	104	19	5	20	9.5	1.7	0.5	1.8	
Anthony Mason	F	Tennessee State	2	2001–2003	147	5,262	1,062	555	1,253	35.8	7.2	3.8	8.5	
Desmond Mason	F	Oklahoma State	4	2002–2005; 2007–2008	249	8,081	1,115	558	3,549	32.5	4.5	2.2	14.3	
Frank Mason III	G	Kansas	1	2019–2020	9	118	19	29	62	13.1	2.1	3.2	6.9	
Wesley Matthews	G	Marquette	3	2019–2020; 2021–2023	168	3,457	371	162	922	20.6	2.2	1.0	5.5	
Scott May	F	Indiana	1	1981–1982	65	1,187	218	133	583	18.3	3.4	2.0	9.0	
Lee Mayberry	G	Arkansas	4	1992–1996	328	6,424	391	1,066	1,753	19.6	1.2	3.3	5.3	
Clyde Mayes	F	Furman	1	1975–1976	65	948	263	37	284	14.6	4.0	0.6	4.4	
O. J. Mayo	G	USC	3	2013–2016	164	4,133	416	428	1,735	25.2	2.5	2.6	10.6	
Luc Mbah a Moute	F	UCLA	5	2008–2013	335	8,408	1,790	320	2,296	25.1	5.3	1.0	6.9	
Chris McCray	G	Maryland	1	2006–2007	5	12	0	0	0	2.4	0.0	0.0	0.0	
Glenn McDonald	G/F	Long Beach State	1	1976–1977	9	79	12	7	19	8.8	1.3	0.8	2.1	
Hank McDowell	F/C	Memphis	1	1986–1987	7	70	19	2	22	10.0	2.7	0.3	3.1	
Jon McGlocklin^{+} (#14)	G/F	Indiana	8	1968–1976	595	17,008	1,432	1,921	7,505	28.6	2.4	3.2	12.6	
McCoy McLemore	F/C	Drake	2	1970–1972	38	514	139	42	161	13.5	3.7	1.1	4.2	
Jodie Meeks	G	Kentucky	1	2009–2010	41	486	72	22	169	11.9	1.8	0.5	4.1	
Sam Merrill	G	Utah State	1	2020–2021	30	233	30	21	89	7.8	1.0	0.7	3.0	
Dave Meyers	F/C	UCLA	4	1975–1978; 1979–1980	281	7,471	1,771	652	3,149	26.6	6.3	2.3	11.2	
Larry Micheaux	F	Houston	1	1984–1985	18	171	44	13	46	9.5	2.4	0.7	2.6	
Khris Middleton^{+}	G/F	Texas A&M	12	2013–2025	735	23,039	3,598	2,990	12,586	31.3	4.9	4.1	17.1	
Jay Miller	F	Notre Dame	1	1968–1969	3	27	2	0	9	9.0	0.7	0.0	3.0	
Nikola Mirotić	F	(Spain) Real Madrid	1	2018–2019	14	320	75	20	163	22.9	5.4	1.4	11.6	
Tony Mitchell	F	Alabama	1	2013–2014	3	10	1	1	6	3.3	0.3	0.3	2.0	
Steve Mix	F	Toledo	1	1982–1983	57	792	136	68	341	13.9	2.4	1.2	6.0	
Eric Mobley	C	Pittsburgh	2	1994–1996	51	652	165	21	186	12.8	3.2	0.4	3.6	
Paul Mokeski	F/C	Kansas	7	1982–1989	438	5,698	1,383	276	1,617	13.0	3.2	0.6	3.7	
Sidney Moncrief^ (#4)	G	Arkansas	10	1979–1989	695	22,054	3,447	2,689	11,594	31.7	5.0	3.9	16.7	
Greg Monroe	F/C	Georgetown	4	2015–2018; 2021–2022	170	4,286	1,274	372	2,222	25.2	7.5	2.2	13.1	
Andre Moore	F	Loyola (IL)	1	1987–1988	3	16	2	1	4	5.3	0.7	0.3	1.3	
Jaylen Morris	G	Molloy	1	2018–2019	4	29	5	4	10	7.3	1.3	1.0	2.5	
Shabazz Muhammad	G/F	UCLA	1	2017–2018	11	117	31	7	94	10.6	2.8	0.6	8.5	
Xavier Munford	G	Rhode Island	1	2017–2018	6	21	1	4	3	3.5	0.2	0.7	0.5	
Eric Murdock	G	Providence	4	1992–1996	245	7,321	773	1,666	3,434	29.9	3.2	6.8	14.0	
Ronald Murray	G	Shaw	1	2002–2003	12	42	1	3	23	3.5	0.1	0.3	1.9	

=== N to O ===
All-time roster
Player	Pos.	Pre-draft team	Yrs	Seasons	Statistics									Ref.
Player	Pos.	Pre-draft team	Yrs	Seasons	GP	MP	REB	AST	PTS	MPG	RPG	APG	PPG	Ref.
Pete Nance^{x}	F	North Carolina	2	2024–2026	53	807	136	55	277	15.2	2.6	1.0	5.2	
Swen Nater	C	UCLA	1	1976–1977	72	1,960	865	108	938	27.2	12.0	1.5	13.0	
Gary Neal	G	Towson	1	2013–2014	30	607	50	46	301	20.2	1.7	1.5	10.0	
Barry Nelson	C	Duquesne	1	1971–1972	28	102	20	7	35	3.6	0.7	0.3	1.3	
Johnny Newman	G/F	Richmond	3	1994–1997	246	6,646	559	361	2,238	27.0	2.3	1.5	9.1	
Rich Niemann	C	Saint Louis	1	1968–1969	18	149	59	7	59	8.3	3.3	0.4	3.3	
David Noel	F	North Carolina	1	2006–2007	68	792	123	65	184	11.6	1.8	1.0	2.7	
Jeff Nordgaard	F	Green Bay	1	1997–1998	13	48	14	3	18	3.7	1.1	0.2	1.4	
Ken Norman	F	Illinois	1	1993–1994	82	2,539	500	222	979	31.0	6.1	2.7	11.9	
Jordan Nwora	F	Louisville	3	2020–2023	130	2,056	398	104	887	15.8	3.1	0.8	6.8	
Steve Novak	F	Marquette	2	2015–2017	11	42	4	0	12	3.8	0.4	0.0	1.1	
Johnny O'Bryant III	F/C	LSU	2	2014–2016	100	1,225	240	49	300	12.3	2.4	0.5	3.0	
Alan Ogg	C	UAB	1	1992–1993	3	26	6	4	8	8.7	2.0	1.3	2.7	
Semi Ojeleye	F	SMU	1	2021–2022	20	308	58	5	57	15.4	2.9	0.3	2.9	
Kevin Ollie	G	UConn	1	2002–2003	53	1,127	99	181	303	21.3	1.9	3.4	5.7	
Dan O'Sullivan	C	Fordham	1	1992–1993	3	7	2	1	5	2.3	0.7	0.3	1.7	

=== P ===
All-time roster
Player	Pos.	Pre-draft team	Yrs	Seasons	Statistics									Ref.
Player	Pos.	Pre-draft team	Yrs	Seasons	GP	MP	REB	AST	PTS	MPG	RPG	APG	PPG	Ref.
Zaza Pachulia	C	(Turkey) Ülkerspor	3	2004–2005; 2013–2015	200	4,452	1,211	374	1,472	22.3	6.1	1.9	7.4	
Jabari Parker	F	Duke	4	2014–2018	183	5,617	998	373	2,794	30.7	5.5	2.0	15.3	
Ruben Patterson	F	Cincinnati	1	2006–2007	81	2,508	440	232	1,194	31.0	5.4	2.9	14.7	
Charlie Paulk	F/C	Northeastern State	1	1968–1969	17	217	78	3	51	12.8	4.6	0.2	3.0	
Cameron Payne	G	Murray State	1	2023–2024	47	702	62	109	291	14.9	1.3	2.3	6.2	
Gary Payton^	G	Oregon State	1	2002–2003	28	1,085	86	206	550	38.8	3.1	7.4	19.6	
Gary Payton II	G	Oregon State	2	2016–2018	18	205	29	22	50	11.4	1.6	1.2	2.8	
Mike Peplowski	C	Michigan State	1	1995–1996	5	12	4	1	7	2.4	0.8	0.2	1.4	
Curtis Perry	F	Missouri State	3	1971–1974	198	5,951	1,818	384	1,691	30.1	9.2	1.9	8.5	
Elliot Perry	G	Memphis	3	1996–1999	168	3,394	240	489	1,173	20.2	1.4	2.9	7.0	
Ricky Pierce^{+}	G	Rice	8	1984–1991; 1997–1998	460	12,055	1,223	907	7,570	26.2	2.7	2.0	16.5	
Ed Pinckney	F	Villanova	1	1994–1995	62	835	211	21	140	13.5	3.4	0.3	2.3	
Marshall Plumlee	C	Duke	1	2017–2018	8	52	17	2	14	6.5	2.1	0.3	1.8	
Miles Plumlee	F/C	Duke	3	2014–2017	112	1,369	331	41	457	12.2	3.0	0.4	4.1	
Mark Pope	F	Kentucky	2	2000–2002	108	1,368	220	55	238	12.7	2.0	0.5	2.2	
Dave Popson	F/C	North Carolina	1	1991–1992	5	26	5	3	7	5.2	1.0	0.6	1.4	
Kevin Porter Jr.	G	USC	2	2024–2026	68	1,859	316	392	1,013	27.3	4.6	5.8	14.9	
Bobby Portis	F/C	Arkansas	6	2020–2026	406	10,089	3,241	575	5,518	24.8	8.0	1.4	13.6	
Paul Pressey	G/F	Tulsa	8	1982–1990	580	16,949	2,496	3,272	6,906	29.2	4.3	5.6	11.9	
Jim Price^{+}	G	Louisville	3	1974–1977	127	4,167	429	633	1,598	32.8	3.4	5.0	12.6	
Taurean Prince	F	Baylor	2	2024–2026	106	2,777	368	201	895	26.2	3.5	1.9	8.4	
Joel Przybilla	C	Minnesota	5	2000–2004; 2012–2013	153	2,045	530	42	268	13.4	3.5	0.3	1.8	
Anthony Pullard	F	McNeese State	1	1992–1993	8	37	8	2	17	4.6	1.0	0.3	2.1	

=== R ===
All-time roster
Player	Pos.	Pre-draft team	Yrs	Seasons	Statistics									Ref.
Player	Pos.	Pre-draft team	Yrs	Seasons	GP	MP	REB	AST	PTS	MPG	RPG	APG	PPG	Ref.
Miroslav Raduljica	C	(Turkey) Efes Pilsen	1	2013–2014	48	465	108	23	181	9.7	2.3	0.5	3.8	
Michael Redd^{+}	G	Ohio State	11	2000–2011	578	19,334	2,334	1,305	11,554	33.4	4.0	2.3	20.0	
JJ Redick	G	Duke	1	2012–2013	28	804	52	76	344	28.7	1.9	2.7	12.3	
J. R. Reid	F	North Carolina	1	1999–2000	34	602	117	18	150	17.7	3.4	0.5	4.4	
Jared Reiner	C	Iowa	1	2006–2007	27	244	71	13	33	9.0	2.6	0.5	1.2	
Shawn Respert	G	Michigan State	2	1995–1997	76	928	81	76	323	12.2	1.1	1.0	4.3	
Kevin Restani	F/C	San Francisco	5	1974–1979	311	6,203	1,440	434	1,862	19.9	4.6	1.4	6.0	
Jerry Reynolds	G/F	LSU	4	1985–1988; 1995–1996	194	2,823	446	308	1,161	14.6	2.3	1.6	6.0	
Luke Ridnour	G	Oregon	3	2008–2010; 2013–2014	190	4,555	423	811	1,746	24.0	2.2	4.3	9.2	
Liam Robbins	C	Vanderbilt	1	2024–2025	13	57	12	2	9	4.4	0.9	0.2	0.7	
Fred Roberts	F/C	BYU	5	1988–1993	394	8,834	1,295	588	3,530	22.4	3.3	1.5	9.0	
Alvin Robertson^{+}	G	Arkansas	4	1989–1993	283	8,725	1,505	1,405	3,600	30.8	5.3	5.0	12.7	
Oscar Robertson^ (#1)	G/F	Cincinnati	4	1970–1974	288	10,798	1,424	2,156	4,701	37.5	4.9	7.5	16.3	
Flynn Robinson^{+}	G	Wyoming	2	1968–1970	146	4,828	500	769	3,084	33.1	3.4	5.3	21.1	
Glenn Robinson^{+}	F	Purdue	8	1994–2002	568	21,262	3,519	1,609	12,010	37.4	6.2	2.8	21.1	
Justin Robinson	G	Virginia Tech	1	2021–2022	17	198	13	21	48	11.6	0.8	1.2	2.8	
Guy Rodgers^	G	Temple	2	1968–1970	145	2,906	300	774	1,037	20.0	2.1	5.3	7.2	
Ryan Rollins^{x}	G	Toledo	3	2023–2026	133	3,208	448	521	1,633	24.1	3.4	3.9	12.3	
Lorenzo Romar	G	Washington	2	1983–1985	69	1,023	92	194	389	14.8	1.3	2.8	5.6	
Derrick Rowland	G	SUNY Potsdam	1	1985–1986	2	9	1	1	3	4.5	0.5	0.5	1.5	
Michael Ruffin	F	Tulsa	1	2007–2008	46	632	186	24	91	13.7	4.0	0.5	2.0	
Bob Rule	F/C	Colorado State	1	1974–1975	1	11	0	2	0	11.0	0.0	2.0	0.0	
Cormac Ryan^{x}	G	North Carolina	1	2025–2026	11	271	28	19	157	24.6	2.5	1.7	14.3	

=== S ===
All-time roster
Player	Pos.	Pre-draft team	Yrs	Seasons	Statistics									Ref.
Player	Pos.	Pre-draft team	Yrs	Seasons	GP	MP	REB	AST	PTS	MPG	RPG	APG	PPG	Ref.
John Salmons	G	Miami (FL)	2	2009–2011	103	3,683	362	350	1,620	35.8	3.5	3.4	15.7	
Jamal Sampson	F/C	California	1	2002–2003	5	8	2	1	0	1.6	0.4	0.2	0.0	
Larry Sanders	F/C	VCU	5	2010–2015	233	4,622	1,341	174	1,516	19.8	5.8	0.7	6.5	
Daniel Santiago	C	Saint Vincent	2	2003–2005	65	813	151	25	239	12.5	2.3	0.4	3.7	
Mark Sears	G	Alabama	1	2025–2026	7	26	2	2	22	3.7	0.3	0.3	3.1	
Danny Schayes	F/C	Syracuse	4	1990–1994	218	4,308	997	215	1,481	19.8	4.6	1.0	6.8	
Ramon Sessions	G	Nevada	3	2007–2009; 2013–2014	124	3,532	413	713	1,557	28.5	3.3	5.8	12.6	
Jerry Sichting	G	Purdue	1	1989–1990	1	27	0	2	3	27.0	0.0	2.0	3.0	
Jack Sikma^	F/C	Illinois Wesleyan	5	1986–1991	392	12,236	3,087	1,143	5,253	31.2	7.9	2.9	13.4	
Bobby Simmons	G/F	DePaul	2	2005–2006; 2007–2008	145	4,059	559	252	1,533	28.0	3.9	1.7	10.6	
Jericho Sims^{x}	C	Texas	2	2024–2026	81	1,528	438	115	368	18.9	5.4	1.4	4.5	
Scott Skiles	G	Michigan State	1	1986–1987	13	205	26	45	49	15.8	2.0	3.5	3.8	
Brian Skinner	F	Baylor	3	2003–2004; 2006–2007; 2010–2011	125	3,106	796	107	883	24.8	6.4	0.9	7.1	
Javonte Smart	G	LSU	1	2021–2022	13	160	19	14	31	12.3	1.5	1.1	2.4	
Elmore Smith	C	Kentucky State	2	1975–1977	112	3,598	1,101	127	1,505	32.1	9.8	1.1	13.4	
Greg Smith	F	Western Kentucky	4	1968–1972	271	7,740	2,266	583	2,640	28.6	8.4	2.2	9.7	
Ish Smith	G	Wake Forest	1	2012–2013	16	138	15	30	38	8.6	0.9	1.9	2.4	
Jason Smith	F/C	Colorado State	1	2018–2019	6	40	11	1	13	6.7	1.8	0.2	2.2	
Joe Smith	F	Maryland	3	2003–2006	194	5,406	1,414	176	2,022	27.9	7.3	0.9	10.4	
Keith Smith	G	Loyola Marymount	1	1986–1987	42	461	32	43	138	11.0	0.8	1.0	3.3	
Sam Smith	G	UNLV	1	1978–1979	16	125	9	16	56	7.8	0.6	1.0	3.5	
Tyler Smith	F	George Bush HS (TX)	1	2024–2025	23	122	25	4	67	5.3	1.1	0.2	2.9	
Tony Smith	G	Marquette	1	1997–1998	7	80	7	10	19	11.4	1.0	1.4	2.7	
Tony Snell	G/F	New Mexico	3	2016–2019	229	5,693	546	262	1,643	24.9	2.4	1.1	7.2	
Jerry Stackhouse	G/F	North Carolina	1	2009–2010	42	855	100	70	358	20.4	2.4	1.7	8.5	
D. J. Stephens	G/F	Memphis	1	2013–2014	3	15	5	0	7	5.0	1.7	0.0	2.3	
Everette Stephens	G	Purdue	1	1990–1991	3	6	0	2	6	2.0	0.0	0.7	2.0	
Alex Stivrins	F	Colorado	1	1992–1993	3	25	6	2	11	8.3	2.0	0.7	3.7	
Awvee Storey	G/F	Arizona State	1	2007–2008	26	259	54	16	92	10.0	2.1	0.6	3.5	
Erick Strickland	G	Nebraska	2	2003–2005	105	1,585	174	205	532	15.1	1.7	2.0	5.1	
John Stroeder	F	Montana	1	1987–1988	41	271	71	20	78	6.6	1.7	0.5	1.9	
Derek Strong	F	Xavier	2	1992–1994	90	1,470	396	62	600	16.3	4.4	0.7	6.7	

=== T ===
All-time roster
Player	Pos.	Pre-draft team	Yrs	Seasons	Statistics									Ref.
Player	Pos.	Pre-draft team	Yrs	Seasons	GP	MP	REB	AST	PTS	MPG	RPG	APG	PPG	Ref.
Jeff Teague	G	Wake Forest	1	2020–2021	21	334	31	59	138	15.9	1.5	2.8	6.6	
Mirza Teletović	F	(Spain) Saski Baskonia	2	2016–2018	80	1,292	185	58	522	16.2	2.3	0.7	6.5	
Garrett Temple	G	LSU	1	2010–2011	9	83	6	6	17	9.2	0.7	0.7	1.9	
Chuck Terry	F	Long Beach State	2	1972–1974	74	725	148	44	135	9.8	2.0	0.6	1.8	
Jason Terry	G	Arizona	2	2016–2018	125	2,179	154	157	473	17.4	1.2	1.3	3.8	
David Thirdkill	G/F	Bradley	1	1984–1985	6	16	2	0	7	2.7	0.3	0.0	1.2	
Cam Thomas	G	LSU	1	2025–2026	18	299	28	34	192	16.6	1.6	1.9	10.7	
Kurt Thomas	F	TCU	1	2009–2010	70	1,049	291	47	210	15.0	4.2	0.7	3.0	
Tim Thomas	F	Villanova	6	1998–2004	385	10,491	1,632	579	4,706	27.2	4.2	1.5	12.2	
George Thompson	G	Marquette	1	1974–1975	73	1,983	181	225	780	27.2	2.5	3.1	10.7	
Paul Thompson	G/F	Tulane	1	1984–1985	16	227	42	20	106	14.2	2.6	1.3	6.6	
Axel Toupane	G/F	(France) SIG Strasbourg	2	2016–2017; 2020–2021	10	67	6	4	14	6.7	0.6	0.4	1.4	
Keith Tower	F/C	Notre Dame	1	1996–1997	5	72	9	1	7	14.4	1.8	0.2	1.4	
Linton Townes	G/F	James Madison	1	1983–1984	2	2	0	0	2	1.0	0.0	0.0	1.0	
Robert Traylor	F	Michigan	2	1998–2000	93	1,233	297	58	416	13.3	3.2	0.6	4.5	
Gary Trent Jr.^{x}	G	Duke	2	2024–2026	139	3,270	235	166	1,353	23.5	1.7	1.2	9.7	
P. J. Tucker	F	Texas	1	2020–2021	20	397	56	16	52	19.9	2.8	0.8	2.6	
Rayjon Tucker	G	Little Rock	1	2021–2022	2	42	4	6	15	21.0	2.0	3.0	7.5	
Mirsad Türkcan	F	(Turkey) Efes Pilsen	1	1999–2000	10	65	23	4	29	6.5	2.3	0.4	2.9	
Andre Turner	G	Memphis	1	1988–1989	4	13	3	0	6	3.3	0.8	0.0	1.5	
Myles Turner^{x}	C	Texas	1	2025–2026	71	1,912	378	103	846	26.9	5.3	1.5	11.9	

=== U to V ===
All-time roster
Player	Pos.	Pre-draft team	Yrs	Seasons	Statistics									Ref.
Player	Pos.	Pre-draft team	Yrs	Seasons	GP	MP	REB	AST	PTS	MPG	RPG	APG	PPG	Ref.
Ekpe Udoh	F/C	Baylor	3	2011–2014	141	2,579	506	100	597	18.3	3.6	0.7	4.2	
Beno Udrih	G	(Italy) Olimpia Milano	2	2011–2013	98	1,799	180	365	611	18.4	1.8	3.7	6.2	
Roko Ukić	G	(Croatia) Split	1	2009–2010	13	97	3	12	40	7.5	0.2	0.9	3.1	
Stanley Umude	G	Arkansas	1	2024–2025	22	86	17	4	15	3.9	0.8	0.2	0.7	
Keith Van Horn	F	Utah	2	2003–2005	58	1,584	323	78	735	27.3	5.6	1.3	12.7	
Norm Van Lier	G	Saint Francis (PA)	1	1978–1979	38	555	40	158	107	14.6	1.1	4.2	2.8	
Greivis Vásquez	G	Maryland	1	2015–2016	23	460	47	91	130	20.0	2.0	4.0	5.7	
Rashad Vaughn	G	UNLV	3	2015–2018	133	1,632	154	74	418	12.3	1.2	0.6	3.1	
Charlie Villanueva	F	UConn	3	2006–2009	193	4,908	1,214	251	2,612	25.4	6.3	1.3	13.5	
Jake Voskuhl	C	UConn	1	2007–2008	44	386	97	13	98	8.8	2.2	0.3	2.2	

=== W ===
All-time roster
Player	Pos.	Pre-draft team	Yrs	Seasons	Statistics									Ref.
Player	Pos.	Pre-draft team	Yrs	Seasons	GP	MP	REB	AST	PTS	MPG	RPG	APG	PPG	Ref.
Lloyd Walton	G	Marquette	4	1976–1980	280	4,566	322	1,035	1,236	16.3	1.2	3.7	4.4	
Kel'el Ware^{x}	C	Indiana	1	2026–2027										
Bob Warlick	G/F	Pepperdine	1	1968–1969	3	22	1	1	6	7.3	0.3	0.3	2.0	
Cornell Warner	F/C	Jackson State	2	1973–1975	146	3,875	1,192	194	1,027	26.5	8.2	1.3	7.0	
Bryan Warrick	G	Saint Joseph's	1	1985–1986	5	27	3	6	10	5.4	0.6	1.2	2.0	
Hakim Warrick	F	Syracuse	1	2009–2010	48	1,024	212	35	490	21.3	4.4	0.7	10.2	
Richard Washington	F/C	UCLA	1	1979–1980	75	1,092	276	55	440	14.6	3.7	0.7	5.9	
TyTy Washington Jr.	G	Kentucky	1	2023–2024	11	56	5	5	14	5.1	0.5	0.5	1.3	
Jeff Webb	G	Kansas State	2	1970–1972	48	409	42	26	94	8.5	0.9	0.5	2.0	
Marvin Webster	C	Morgan State	1	1986–1987	15	102	26	3	27	6.8	1.7	0.2	1.8	
Bob Weiss	G	Penn State	1	1968–1969	15	242	27	27	99	16.1	1.8	1.8	6.6	
Jiří Welsch	G	(Slovenia) Union Olimpija	1	2005–2006	58	866	111	62	251	14.9	1.9	1.1	4.3	
Walt Wesley	C	Kansas	1	1974–1975	41	214	55	11	88	5.2	1.3	0.3	2.1	
Mark West	F/C	Old Dominion	1	1984–1985	1	6	1	0	2	6.0	1.0	0.0	2.0	
Rory White	F	South Alabama	1	1983–1984	8	45	8	1	16	5.6	1.0	0.1	2.0	
Lindell Wigginton	G	Iowa State	3	2021–2024	29	294	32	37	136	10.1	1.1	1.3	4.7	
Aaron Williams	F/C	Xavier	1	1994–1995	15	72	19	0	24	4.8	1.3	0.0	1.6	
Marvin Williams	F	North Carolina	1	2019–2020	17	321	74	19	68	18.9	4.4	1.1	4.0	
Mo Williams	G	Alabama	4	2004–2008	272	8,667	946	1,549	3,828	31.9	3.5	5.7	14.1	
Ron Williams	G	West Virginia	2	1973–1975	117	1,656	112	224	592	14.2	1.0	1.9	5.1	
Sam Williams	G	Iowa	2	1968–1970	66	672	116	64	255	10.2	1.8	1.0	3.9	
Scott Williams	F/C	North Carolina	3	1998–2001	139	2,789	824	63	937	20.1	5.9	0.5	6.7	
D. J. Wilson	F	Michigan	4	2017–2021	119	1,421	349	83	477	11.9	2.9	0.7	4.0	
Marv Winkler	G	Louisiana	1	1970–1971	3	14	4	2	8	4.7	1.3	0.7	2.7	
Rickie Winslow	F	Houston	1	1987–1988	7	45	7	2	7	6.4	1.0	0.3	1.0	
Brian Winters^{+} (#32)	G/F	South Carolina	8	1975–1983	582	18,422	1,550	2,479	9,743	31.7	2.7	4.3	16.7	
Joe Wolf	F/C	North Carolina	1	1996–1997	56	525	112	20	95	9.4	2.0	0.4	1.7	
Nate Wolters	G	South Dakota State	2	2013–2015	69	1,451	165	197	442	21.0	2.4	2.9	6.4	
Christian Wood	F	UNLV	1	2018–2019	13	62	20	2	37	4.8	1.5	0.2	2.8	
David Wood	F	Nevada	1	1996–1997	46	240	27	13	57	5.2	0.6	0.3	1.2	
Orlando Woolridge	F	Notre Dame	1	1992–1993	8	78	9	3	43	9.8	1.1	0.4	5.4	
Haywoode Workman	G	Oral Roberts	2	1998–2000	52	1,063	119	216	266	20.4	2.3	4.2	5.1	
Chris Wright	F	Dayton	1	2013–2014	8	126	20	5	48	15.8	2.5	0.6	6.0	
Delon Wright	G	Utah	1	2024–2025	26	405	46	48	65	15.6	1.8	1.8	2.5	

=== X to Z ===
All-time roster
Player	Pos.	Pre-draft team	Yrs	Seasons	Statistics									Ref.
Player	Pos.	Pre-draft team	Yrs	Seasons	GP	MP	REB	AST	PTS	MPG	RPG	APG	PPG	Ref.
Yi Jianlian	F	(China) Guangdong Southern Tigers	1	2007–2008	66	1,647	344	55	566	25.0	5.2	0.8	8.6	
Danny Young	G	Wake Forest	1	1994–1995	7	77	5	12	24	11.0	0.7	1.7	3.4	
Tyler Zeller	F/C	North Carolina	1	2017–2018	24	406	111	19	141	16.9	4.6	0.8	5.9	
Bill Zopf	G	Duquesne	1	1970–1971	53	398	46	73	118	7.5	0.9	1.4	2.2	
