= Ace Custis =

American basketball player and coach

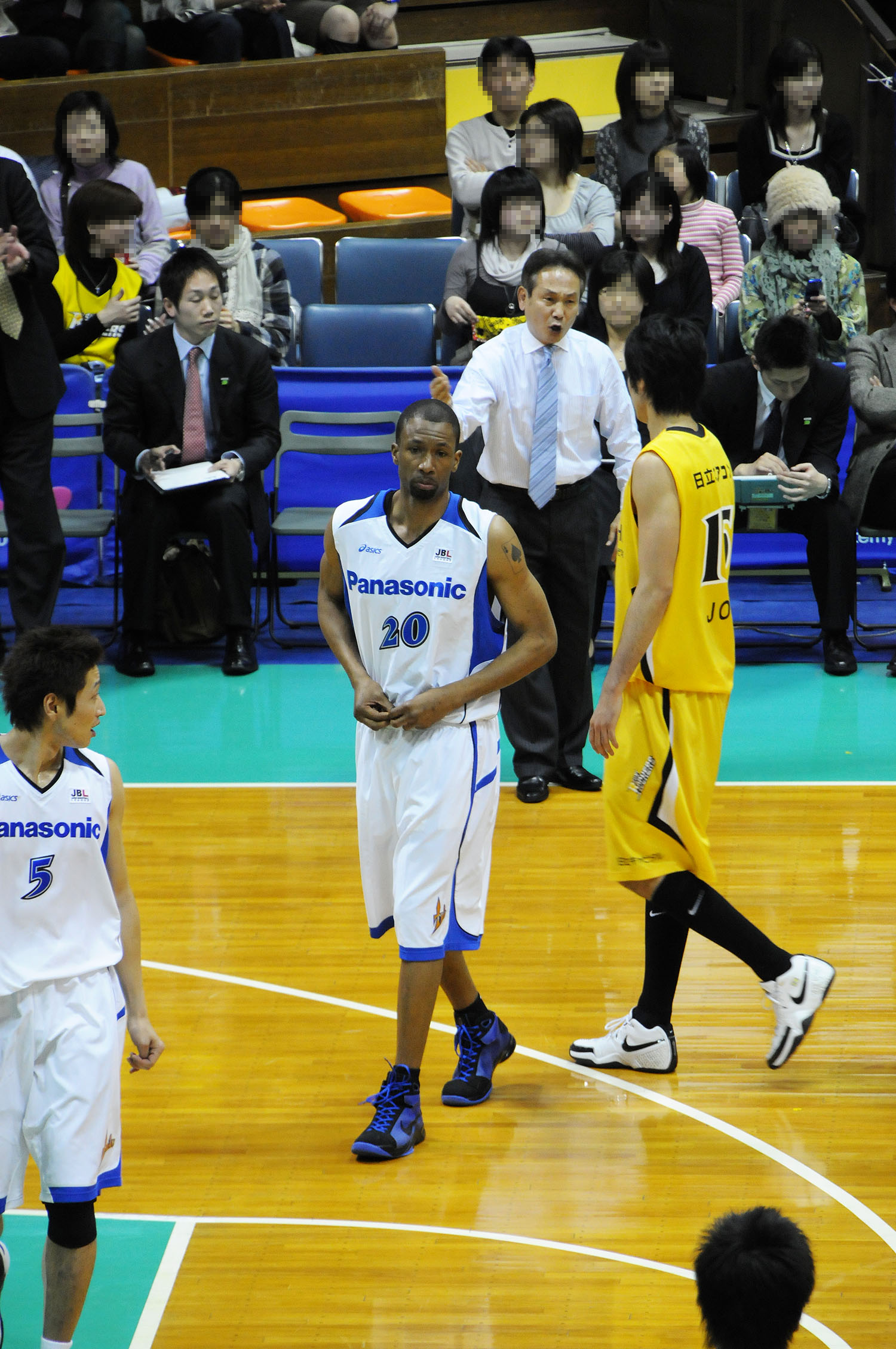
- Adrian Custis, 2009

Virginia Tech Hokies
- Title: Special Assistant to the Head Coach
- League: Atlantic Coast Conference

Personal information
- Born: May 24, 1974 (age 52) Eastville, Virginia
- Listed height: 6 ft 7 in (2.01 m)
- Listed weight: 220 lb (100 kg)

Career information
- High school: Northampton (Eastville, Virginia)
- College: Virginia Tech (1993–1997)
- NBA draft: 1997: undrafted
- Playing career: 1997–2012
- Position: Forward
- Coaching career: 2013–present

Career history

Playing
- 1999–2000: Grand Rapids Hoops
- 2005: San Miguel Beermen

Coaching
- 2013–2014: Virginia State (assistant)
- 2014–2019: Maryland Eastern Shore (assistant)
- 2019–present: Virginia Tech (staff)

Career highlights
- PBA champion (2005 Fiesta); 2× First-team All-Atlantic 10 (1996, 1997); First-team All-Metro Conference (1995); No. 20 retired by Virginia Tech Hokies

Adrian "Ace" Custis (born May 24, 1974) is an American basketball coach and former professional basketball player. He last played in Japan with the Wakayama Trians. After a severe knee injury while trying out for the Dallas Mavericks, Ace became known as one of the best power forwards throughout Asia playing in such countries as Lebanon, Japan, Qatar, Indonesia, Syria and the Philippines. Ace made a further name for himself in prestigious clubs such as Al Riyadi where he won a championship. Ace graduated from Virginia Tech and won the 1995 NIT championship. In 1997, Ace was an NCAA All-American. In 2007, Ace was inducted into the Virginia Tech Sports Hall of Fame; his #20 jersey was retired and hangs alongside the NBA shooting great Dell Curry. Techhoops, a basketball publication, named Ace Custis one of the 10 greatest players ever in Virginia Tech history.

Custis was an assistant coach with the Maryland Eastern Shore Hawks men's basketball team from 2014 to 2019. He is a native of Eastville, Virginia and resides in Fruitland, Maryland.

In 2019 he was hired as the coordinator of basketball relations at Virginia Tech. In 2020 he was promoted to special assistant to the head coach.
