= Chris Smith (basketball, born 1939) =

American basketball player (born 1939)

Personal information
- Born: March 31, 1939 (age 87)
- Listed height: 6 ft 6 in (1.98 m)

Career information
- High school: Charleston (Charleston, West Virginia)
- College: Virginia Tech (1957–1961)
- NBA draft: 1961: 2nd round, 14th overall pick
- Drafted by: Syracuse Nationals
- Position: Center

Career highlights
- 2× Honorable Mention All-American – AP (1960, 1961); 3× First-team all-SoCon (1959–1961)
- Stats at Basketball Reference

Chris Smith (born March 31, 1939) is an American former college basketball player for the Virginia Tech Hokies from 1957 to 1961. He was nicknamed "Moose" at Charleston High School in West Virginia where he played as a 6-foot-6 center. During an era of exceptional local talent, in what was then known as the Kanawha Valley, Smith was later dubbed "The Human Pogo Stick" by former Roanoke sportswriter Bill Brill.

== Refusal of the 1961 NBA draft ==
During the 1961 NBA draft, Smith was the highest draft choice for any Virginia Tech basketball player ever when he was selected as the fourteenth overall choice by the NBA's Syracuse Nationals.

Since playing professional basketball was not financially lucrative in 1961, Smith reportedly informed the NBA teams that he would not play professional basketball and asked them not to draft him. He never reported to Syracuse camp.

== Awards and records ==
In 1982, Smith was inducted as a charter member to Virginia Tech's Hall-of-Fame. He was the only basketball player in the class.

Smith still holds many Virginia Tech rebounding records: game (36); season (495); career (1508); season per-game average (20.4); and career per-game average (17.1). Smith is the state of Virginia's NCAA Division I leader in career average rebounds per game of all time.

He is still ranked 26th nationally for career average rebounds per game (17.1) and 24th nationally for total career rebounds (1508) as listed all-time for Division I players by the Official 2008 NCAA Men's Basketball Records Book. His career average rebound record of 17.1 rebounds per game is the current record for the State of Virginia.

In addition, Smith has the Southern Conference tournament rebounding records of 28 rebounds for a single game and 71 rebounds for three games. These records were established in 1960 and have been the Southern Conference tournament rebounding records for more than 50 years.

== Reputation and coverage ==
According to the 2009–10 Virginia Tech basketball program, Smith "is regarded by many as the greatest basketball player in school history." In 2010, he was chosen to represent the Hokies at the annual 2010 Atlantic Coast Conference tournament's Legends Class. In 2010, ESPN selected Chris Smith as the "Best Player" in the history of the Virginia Tech Basketball program.

In 1959, Chris Smith was a First Team All-Southern Conference Selection. In 1960, he was a unanimous 1960 First Team All-Southern Conference Selection along with Jerry West. In 1961, Smith was the captain of the All-Southern Conference team. In 1960, he was selected as a Converse Second Team All-American.

Sports Illustrated featured the Virginia Tech basketball team on December 26, 1960. That issue stated the following:

Clearly the best performer on the floor was Tech's 6-foot-6 center Chris Smith, who scored 24 points and had 21 rebounds. The next night he led Tech to an 81-54 victory over Baylor and was chosen as the Classic's most valuable player. He is a square-jawed, crew-cut battler whose sheer strength and spring will surely bring him All-American honors this year.

Frequent news articles still appear that document events during Smith's playing career such as Jennings Culley's July 22, 2001 article in the Richmond Times titled "Tech Basketball Recruits said 'Noe' to West Virginia"; Jack Bogaczyk's February 25, 2009 article about the second college basketball game in the Charleston Civic Center between Marshall and Virginia Tech; and MSN Sports November 16, 2008 article about Chuck Noe's successful basketball recruiting in West Virginia for Virginia Tech during the 1950s.
