= Jeff Allen (basketball) =

American basketball player (born 1987)

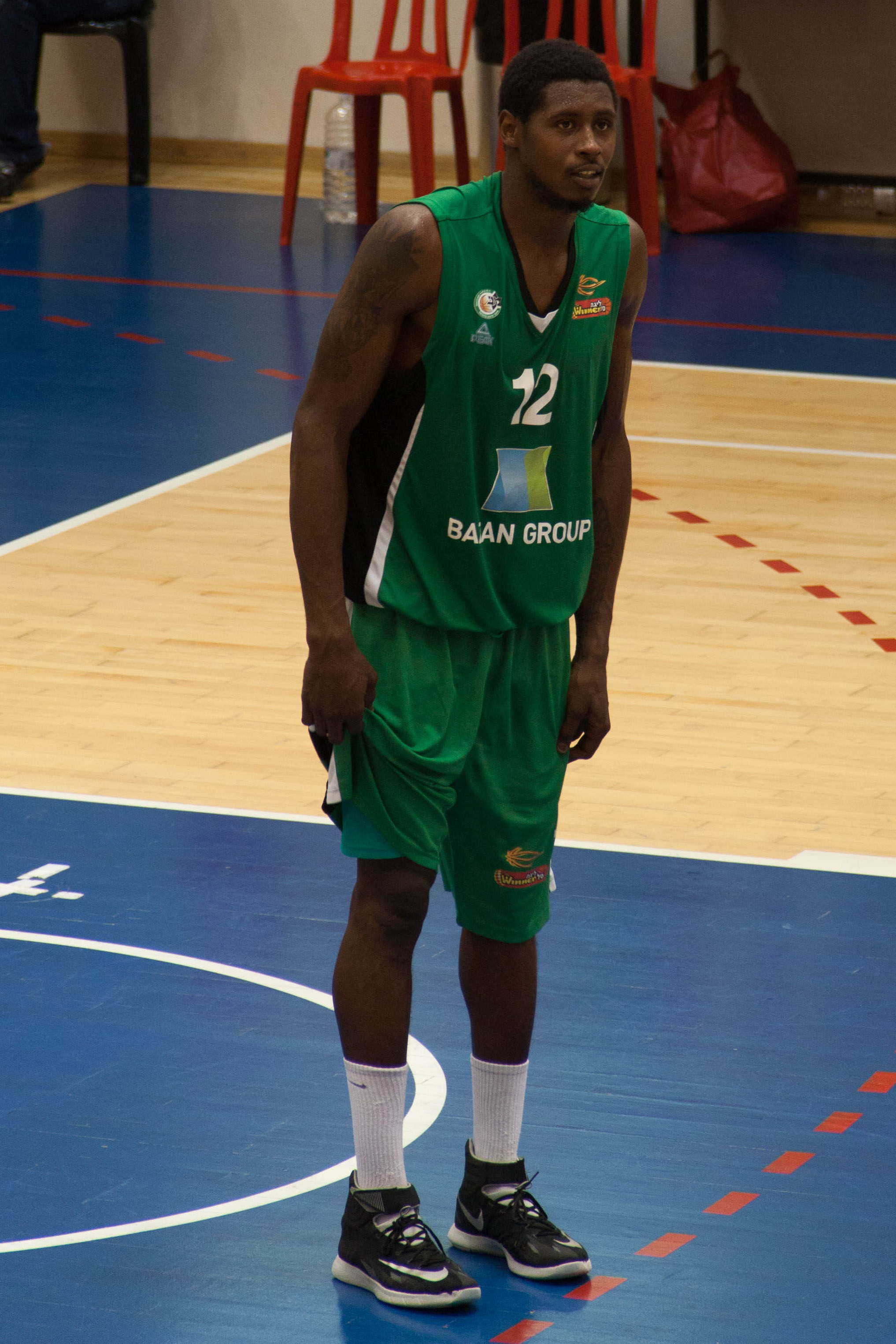
- Allen in action with Maccabi Haifa

Pioneros Del Avila
- Position: Power forward / center

Personal information
- Born: June 12, 1987 (age 39) Washington, D.C., U.S.
- Listed height: 6 ft 7 in (2.01 m)
- Listed weight: 230 lb (104 kg)

Career information
- High school: Hargrave Military Academy (Chatham, Virginia)
- College: Virginia Tech (2007–2011)
- NBA draft: 2011: undrafted
- Playing career: 2011–present

Career history
- 2011–2012: Olympique Antibes
- 2012–2013: Hapoel Tel Aviv
- 2013–2014: Hapoel Afula
- 2014: Maccabi Haifa
- 2015: Šiauliai
- 2015–2016: Hapoel Tel Aviv
- 2016–2017: Hapoel Be'er Sheva
- 2017: Hapoel Tel Aviv
- 2018: Hapoel Afula
- 2018: Hebei Xianglan
- 2018–2019: Hapoel Haifa
- 2019: San Carlos
- 2020–2021: Apollon Limassol
- 2021: Kaposvari KK
- 2021: Cañeros del Este
- 2023-2024: Metros de Santiago
- 2024: Jaguares UAM
- 2025-Present: Pioneros Del Avila

Career highlights
- Baltic League champion (2015); Second-team All-ACC (2011); ACC All-Freshman Team (2008)

Jeffery Edward Allen Jr. (born June 12, 1987) is an American professional basketball player who has clipped over 123 Double Doubles in international professional play In 2025 he played for Pioneros Del Vila of the SPB league in Venezuela for the 2025 season where in 38 games, he averaged 13.3 PPG, 6.4 RPG, 1 STL, 15.6 EFF, while shooting 50% from the field on 24 Minutes per game. Allen won the 'Hoops Agents Player of the Week' award for round 2. For the season, he was awarded 'latinbasket.com All-Venezuelan SPB Honorable Mention 2025'. In 2024, Jeff played briefly in Nicaragua's Liga Superior de Baloncesto (LSB) for the Jaguares UAM club. In 30 MPG, he averaged 16.3 PPG, 11.7 RPG, 3.4 APG, 1.6 SPG, 1.5 BPG, an impressive 24.4 EFF, while shooting 56.7 FG% in 11 games. He brought them to the Championship, but fell just short to Real Esteli.

Prior in 23-24 he played for Metros de Santiago and from 21-23 played for Caneros Del Este in the Dominican Republic LNB. During the 3 professional seasons in the Dominican Republic, he racked up 464 points and 195 rebounds in 38 games played.

Prior to signing with them in February 2021, Jeff played in the Cypriot League with Apollon Limassol where he was 1st in the league in 13.3 RPG, 28.3 EFF and 1.6 BPG and 2nd in league in PPG at 21.3 while shooting 57% from the field. Allen won 'League Player of the Week' on an impressive league high 4 occasions in 2020 (Week 1,4,5 and 13). He also was awarded with All-Imports Team, All-Defensive Team, All-Second Team, and Newcomer of the year by the Eurobasket.com All-Cyprus League Awards 2021.

He played college basketball for Virginia Tech in the ACC where he was a 4-year starter. Over the 4 years Allen averaged 12.7 PPG, 8.3 RPG, 1.7 SPG, and 1.1 BPG while playing an average of 29 minutes per game.

== College career ==
In his four-year career at Virginia Tech between 2007 and 2011, Allen played in 134 career games and made 130 starts. He became the first player in ACC history to record 1,500 career points, 1,000 rebounds, 200 steals and 150 blocked shots.

== Professional career ==
After going un-drafted in the 2011 NBA draft, Allen moved to France and played for Olympique Antibes during the 2011–12 LNB Pro B season. In 32 games for Antibes, he averaged 13.5 points, 8.2 rebounds, 1.3 assists and 1.8 steals per game.

In 2012, Allen began a successful career playing in Israel, signing with Hapoel Tel Aviv for the 2012–13 season. After an injury hit year in 2012–13, Allen moved clubs and joined Hapoel Afula for the 2013–14 season. In 34 games for Afula, he averaged 19.5 points, 13.1 rebounds, 1.9 assists, 2.3 steals and 1.6 blocks per game.

On July 22, 2014, Allen signed a two-year deal with Maccabi Haifa. However, his stint with Haifa only lasted half a season after being released by the club on December 7, 2014. The following month, he signed with Šiauliai of Lithuania for the rest of the season. In 20 league games for Šiauliai, he averaged 5.2 points and 6.2 rebounds per game.

On September 24, 2015, Allen signed a short-term contract with Hapoel Tel Aviv, returning to the club for a second stint.

On September 1, 2016, Allen signed with Israeli club Hapoel Be'er Sheva of the Liga Leumit.

On September 10, 2017, Allen returned to Hapoel Tel Aviv for the 2017–18 season. However, on December 9, 2017, Allen was released by Hapoel after appearing in eight games. On January 11, 2018, Allen returned for a second stint in Hapoel Afula for the rest of the season, joining his former teammate Tre Simmons.

On August 1, 2018, Allen signed a one-year deal with Peristeri in Greece. However, on October 21, 2018, Allen parted ways with Peristeri and joined Hapoel Haifa.

On August 30, 2020, Allen signed with Apollon Limassol in the Cypriot League.

On February 2, 2021, Allen signed with Kaposvari KK of the Hungarian Nemzeti Bajnokság I/A (NB I/A). He averaged 18.7 points, 8.5 rebounds, 1.7 assists and 1.8 steals per game. On August 23, 2021, Allen signed with Cañeros del Este of the Dominican Liga Nacional de Baloncesto.

== The Basketball Tournament (TBT) ==
In the summer of 2017, Allen competed in The Basketball Tournament on ESPN for the number one seeded FCM Untouchables. Competing for the $2 million grand prize, Allen averaged 8 points and 3.7 rebounds per game on 67% shooting from the field. The Untouchables advanced to the Super 16 Round where they were defeated 85–71 by Team FOE, a Philadelphia-based team coached by NBA forwards Markieff and Marcus Morris.
