= Wayne Robinson (basketball) =

American basketball player (born 1958)

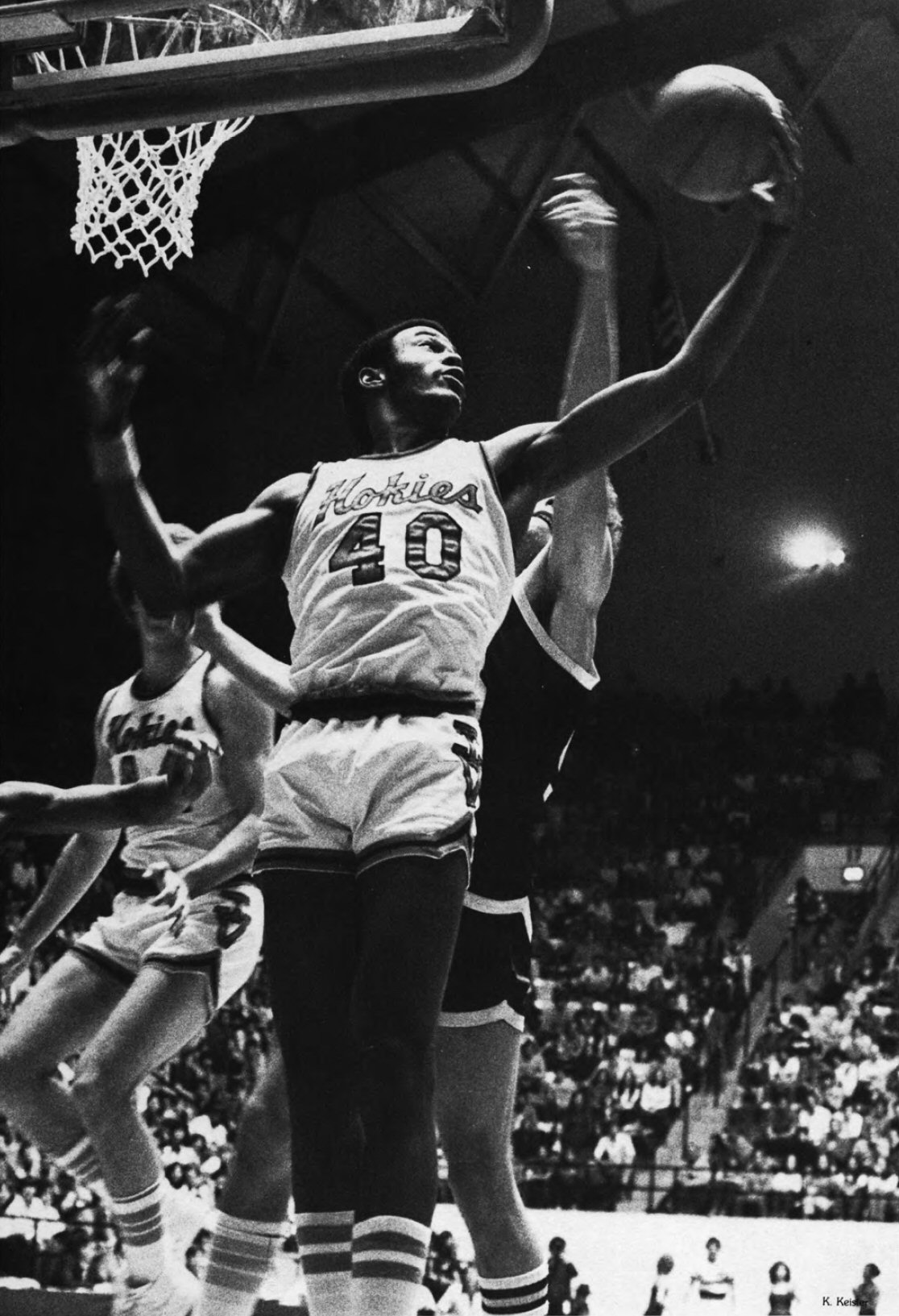
- Robinson with the Virginia Tech Hokies

Personal information
- Born: April 19, 1958 (age 68) Greensboro, North Carolina, U.S.
- Listed height: 6 ft 8 in (2.03 m)
- Listed weight: 217 lb (98 kg)

Career information
- High school: Greensboro Day School (Greensboro, North Carolina)
- College: Virginia Tech (1976–1980)
- NBA draft: 1980: 2nd round, 31st overall pick
- Drafted by: Los Angeles Lakers
- Playing career: 1980–1993
- Position: Power forward
- Number: 42

Career history
- 1980–1981: Detroit Pistons
- 1981–1983: Oece / Bic Trieste
- 1983–1986: Real Madrid
- 1986–1988: Granollers
- 1991–1992: TDK Manresa
- 1992–1993: Juventud Alcalá
- Stats at NBA.com
- Stats at Basketball Reference

For the American NFL player, see Wayne Robinson. Wayne Howard Robinson (born April 19, 1958) is an American former basketball player. He was a 6'8", 217 lb power forward. He played one season in the National Basketball Association (NBA) with the Detroit Pistons (1980–81). He played college basketball for the Virginia Tech Hokies.

== Early years ==
Robinson attended Greensboro Day School. He accepted a basketball scholarship from Virginia Tech. He became a starter as a sophomore and led the team in rebounds in each of his last three years. He averaged 11.2 points and 7.4 rebounds during his college career.

He is ranked fourth among the school's all-time career rebound leaders and is 27th in career scoring. In 2003, he was inducted into the Virginia Tech Sports Hall of Fame. In 2011, he was named to the ACC Basketball Tournament Legends roster.

== Professional career ==
Robinson was selected by the Los Angeles Lakers in the second round (31st pick overall) of the 1980 NBA draft. He played in the Lakers' 6 exhibition games, averaging 5 points and 3 rebounds per game. On October 2, he was traded to the Detroit Pistons in exchange for a 1981 second round draft choice (#39-Harvey Knuckles). As a rookie, he averaged 7.9 points and 19.6 minutes per game. He was released on October 27, 1981.

In 1981, he opted to continue his professional career in the Italian basketball league, signing with the Oece Trieste of the Serie A2 Basket. He contributed to the team winning a promotion to the Lega Basket Serie A, while averaging 17 points and 8.4 rebounds per game. In 1982, he had similar averages in the division 1, registering 16.7 points and 8.7 rebounds per game.

In 1983, he signed with the Spanish club Real Madrid, to play under coach Lolo Sainz. In his first season, he formed a lethal pair under the boards with Fernando Martín Espina, averaging 13.5 points and 9 rebounds per game. He would also be a witness of the fight that took place in the second match of the championship series against FC Barcelona Bàsquet, between Martín, Mike Davis and Juanma López Iturriaga, which caused the Barca squad not to show up for the third match because of disagreements with the sanctions of the Competition Committee, earning Real Madrid a controversial league title. The team would also win the FIBA Saporta Cup that season.

Despite his production (16.1 points and 7.4 rebounds in 84-85 and 16.0 and 7.4 in 85–86), Real Madrid decided to dispense of his services in search of a player of more strength, such as Brad Branson. During his time with the team he won three league titles and two Copas del Rey.

In 1986, he signed with the Cacaolat Granollers, who aspired to win against the elite teams of the league. Despite his good stats (18.4 points and 7.4 rebounds in his first season and 20.3 and 8.8 in his second), the team failed to achieve their goal of getting into the ACB semi-finals. In 1991, there were high expectations after the team's merger with the RCD Espanyol Bàsquet, but it coincided with problems detected Robinson's heart, that forced him to announce his retirement, although a few months later it was reported that his ailments were not as serious as initially feared.

Robinson spent two years in the United States engaged in his businesses, until in 1991 he decided to return to the courts, accepting the offer from the TDK Manresa to replace Lance Berwald for 6 games. In 1992, at the age of 34, he signed with Juventud Alcalá of the First Division and announced his final retirement at the end of the season.

== Personal life ==
In 1989, he received his pastoral ordination from the Cathedral of His Glory. He currently is a pastor of the New Millenium Christian Center.

== Career statistics ==
Legend
GP	Games played	GS	Games started	MPG	Minutes per game
FG%	Field goal percentage	3P%	3-point field goal percentage	FT%	Free throw percentage
RPG	Rebounds per game	APG	Assists per game	SPG	Steals per game
BPG	Blocks per game	PPG	Points per game	**Bold**	Career high

=== NBA ===
==== Regular season ====
Year	Team	GP	MPG	FG%	3P%	FT%	RPG	APG	SPG	BPG	PPG
1980–81	Detroit	81	19.7	.460	.000	.729	3.6	1.4	.6	.3	7.9
