= Jimmy Carruth =

American basketball player

Personal information
- Born: November 4, 1969 (age 57) El Paso, Texas, U.S.
- Listed height: 6 ft 10 in (2.08 m)
- Listed weight: 265 lb (120 kg)

Career information
- High school: Stephen F. Austin (Austin, Texas)
- College: Virginia Tech (1990–1994)
- NBA draft: 1994: undrafted
- Playing career: 1994–2000
- Position: Power forward
- Number: 40

Career history
- 1994–1995: Grand Rapids Mackers
- 1995–1998: Fort Wayne Fury
- 1997: Milwaukee Bucks
- 1997: Atlantic City Seagulls
- 1999–2000: Richmond Rhythm

Career highlights
- CBA All-Defensive Team (1997); 2× CBA blocks leader (1997–1998)

Career NBA statistics
- Points: 5 (1.3 ppg)
- Rebounds: 4 (1.0 rpg)
- Block: 2 (0.5 apg)
- Stats at NBA.com
- Stats at Basketball Reference

Jimmy Dawn Carruth II (born November 4, 1969, in El Paso, Texas) is an American former basketball player.

He played collegiately for Virginia Tech, and appeared 4 games for the Milwaukee Bucks of the National Basketball Association (NBA) during the 1996–97 NBA season.

Carruth played in the Continental Basketball Association (CBA) for the Grand Rapids Mackers from 1994 to 1995 and the Fort Wayne Fury from 1995 to 1998. He was selected to the CBA All-Defensive Team in 1997. Carruth also played for the Atlantic City Seagulls of the United States Basketball League (USBL) in 1997 and the Richmond Rhythm of the International Basketball League (IBL) during the 1999–2000 season.
