= Virginia Tech Hokies men's basketball =

Men's basketball team

| 2026–27 Virginia Tech Hokies men's basketball team |
- University: Virginia Tech
- First season: 1908–09; 118 years ago
- Athletic director: Whit Babcock
- Head coach: Mike Young; 7th season, 124–98 (.559)
- Location: Blacksburg, Virginia
- Arena: Cassell Coliseum (capacity: 10,052)
- NCAA division: Division I
- Conference: ACC
- Nickname: Hokies
- Colors: Chicago maroon and burnt orange
- Student section: Cassell Guard
- All-time record: 1,588–1,318 (.546)
- NCAA tournament record: 8–13 (.381)

NCAA Division I tournament Elite Eight
- 1967
Other NCAA Division I tournament results
| Sweet Sixteen | 1967, 2019 |
| Appearances | 1967, 1976, 1979, 1980, 1985, 1986, 1996, 2007, 2017, 2018, 2019, 2021, 2022 |

NIT champions
- 1973, 1995

Conference tournament champions
- Metro: 1979 ACC: 2022

Conference regular-season champions
- SoCon: 1960

Conference division champions
- A-10 West: 1996

Uniforms
| Home | Away | Alternate |

The Virginia Tech Hokies men's basketball team is an NCAA Division I college basketball team competing in the Atlantic Coast Conference. Home games are played at Cassell Coliseum, located on Virginia Tech's campus in Blacksburg, Virginia.

The Hokies have made the NCAA tournament 13 times, the most recent appearance coming in 2022. They have reached the Sweet Sixteen twice, in 1967 and 2019. They advanced to the Elite Eight once, in 1967.

The Hokies won the ACC Tournament title in 2022, the Metro Conference tournament title in 1979, the Southern Conference regular season championship in 1959–60, and two National Invitation Tournament titles in 1973 and 1995.

== History ==
=== Early years, Southern Conference, Independent ===
The Hokies' first intercollegiate basketball game was played January 22, 1909, resulting in a 33–26 win over Emory & Henry College. During the 1909–10 campaign, the Hokies completed the only undefeated season in school history by posting an 11–0 mark.

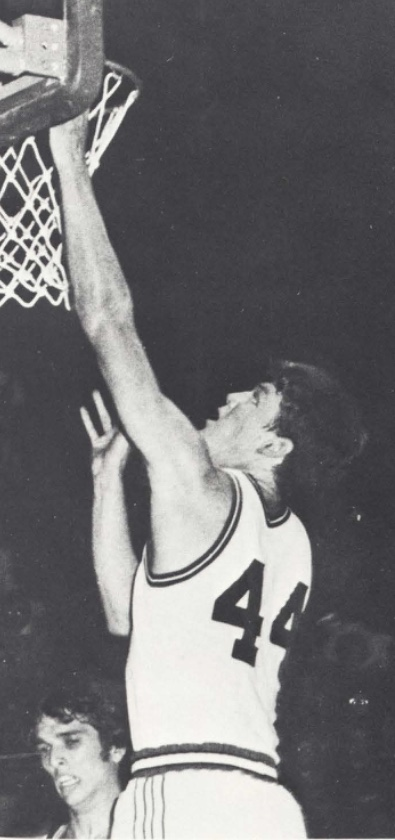
Allan Bristow led the Hokies to the 1973 NIT title.

From 1921 to 1965, Virginia Tech was a member of the Southern Conference. In 45 years, Tech won one regular season conference championship. That was in 1960, when under coach Coach Chuck Noe the Hokies hit the 20-win mark for the first time. That team lost to West Virginia, led by Jerry West, in the conference tournament championship game, and therefore was not eligible to advance to the NCAA tournament.

Tech left the Southern Conference in 1965, and in its first season as an independent went to the NIT for the first time in school history, posting an overall mark of 19–5 after losing to Temple in the first round. It was coach Howie Shannon second year at the school. The next year, in the 1966–67 season, Tech earned its first trip to NCAA tournament. That year, Tech won two games in the tournament that included only 23 teams, making it to what is now called the Elite Eight. The team finished with a 20–5 record. Shannon coached at Tech for seven seasons, and posted 104 wins, with only one losing season.

In 1971, Tech hired 29-year old Ohio State assistant coach Don DeVoe. In 1973, Tech made its second appearance in the NIT, and stunned the country, winning four games in Madison Square Garden by a total of five points, including a heart-wrenching 92–91 overtime win over Notre Dame. At the time, the NCAA only invited 32 teams, and only winners of conference tournaments were eligible. Tech earned an independent berth in the 1975-76 NCAA tournament in a field of 32. DeVoe and Tech parted ways following that season when he refused to sign a new contract after openly admitted that he was a candidate for the vacant head coaching job at Ohio State, his alma mater.

=== The Metro Conference Era ===
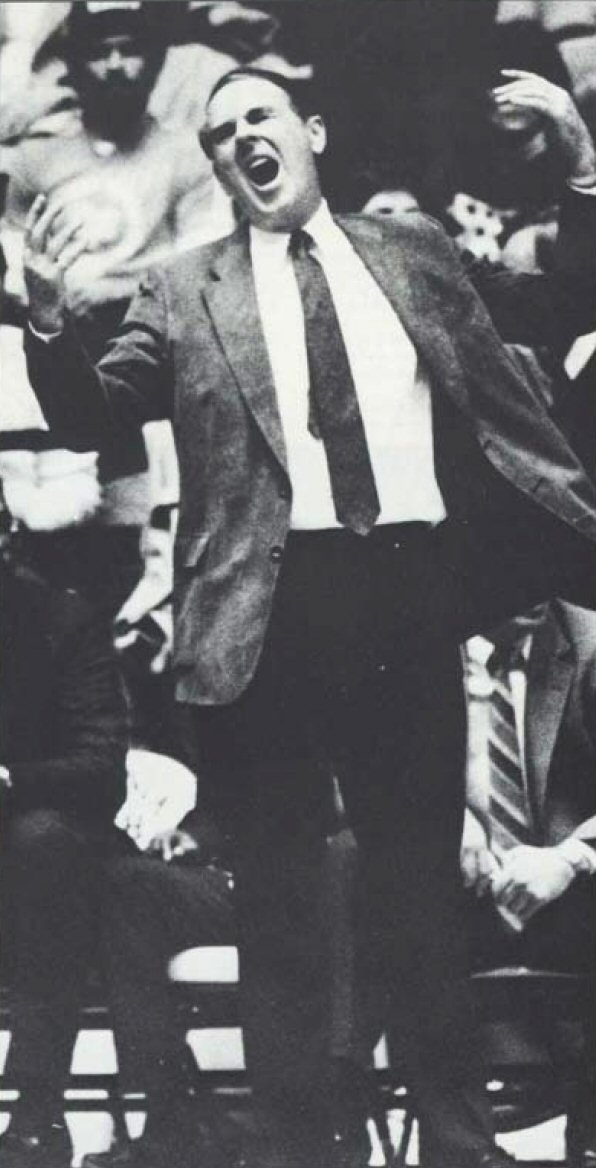
Charlie Mohr led VT in its transition into the Metro Conference.

In 1978, one year after former Tech assistant Charlie Moir took the reins from DeVoe, Virginia Tech joined the Metro 7, a conference that did not have a football championship. Tech's first year in the Metro led to its first conference championship. Even though it did not compete in a round-robin regular season schedule, it was able to beat regular season champion Louisville in the semi-finals and Florida State in the tournament championship game to earn its third trip to the NCAA tournament, where it lost to NCAA runner-up Indiana State led by star Larry Bird.

Tech finished second, or tied for second, in the conference three times in the next seven years, and won 20 games in seven of its first eight seasons in the Metro. Moir guided Tech to 213 wins in 11 seasons from 1976 to 1987. The Hokies appeared in four NCAA Tournaments and went to the NIT four times in Moir's tenure as coach. Fortunes changed for the Hokies in 1986–87 when the team had its first losing season since 1969–70. Moir and Tech reached an agreement to part ways following an NCAA investigation that left the team on probation through October, 1989. Tech paid Moir $250,000 to buy out his contract.

Tech hired Moir's assistant Frankie Allen as interim head coach to lead the program in the 1987–1988 season while it searched for an athletic director to replace Bill Dooley. Allen was Moir's first recruit at Roanoke College, and that institution's first African American athlete. He had been on the Tech staff for 11 years. When Dave Braine was hired as athletic director, he gave Allen the job as head coach. Allen led the Hokies to a 19–10 record and a third place tie in the Metro conference in that year that he began as interim coach. However, he did not have another winning season in his next three years, and his contract was not renewed.

Bill Foster, former coach of Clemson and Miami took over as head coach in 1991. After two straight 10–18 seasons, the Hokies broke a five-year losing streak with an 18–10 record and a fourth-place finish in the Metro Conference in the '93–'94 season. The following year, the Hokies earned their first postseason berth since 1986, and capitalized by winning their second NIT title. The team set the school record at the time with 25 wins, including five wins in the NIT. It was their last season in the Metro Conference.

=== A decade of conference and coaching changes ===
In 1991, the Big East, previously a basketball-only conference, decided to begin play as a football conference. Miami, which had just restarted its basketball program in 1985 and played as an independent, was accepted as an "all-sports" member. Rutgers, Temple, West Virginia and Virginia Tech were added as "football only" members. Tech sought full Big East membership, including for basketball, and in March 1994, the league voted on expansion. Tech was left out of the mix as West Virginia and Rutgers got the nod. Tech was left seeking to join its fellow Metro members in an attempt to create another large conference. However, it was also left out of that mix, along with Metro member Virginia Commonwealth. The two schools sued the 12 members of the new conference, but in the end Tech had to settle for its third choice for a basketball league, the Atlantic 10.

Foster and the Hokies took the A-10 by storm in its first year in the league, finishing tied for first in the East division of the 12-team league. It went to the NCAA tournament and won its first game before bowing out to eventual national champion Kentucky. After the following season, Foster retired, and was replaced by Bobby Hussey, one of Foster's assistants. Hussey was fired after two losing seasons. The Hokies then turned to a former nemesis as its next head coach, tapping former UVA star Ricky Stokes for the head job. In Stokes' first season, Tech's last season in the A-10, Tech eked out a 16–15 record.

In November 1999, Tech finally was rewarded with an invitation to full membership in the Big East Conference. However, the Hokies were overmatched their first three years in the league, winning a total of 10 games in three years, finishing last of seven teams in the East division each of those years, and never reaching the conference tournament where only the top six teams of the division made the tournament. Stokes was fired at the end of the 2003 season. Stokes was dismissed after three straight losing season in the Big East, and Tech brought in coach Seth Greenberg to right the ship.

=== Joining the Atlantic Coast Conference ===
On June 25, 2003, Virginia Tech received news it had waited anxiously to receive for a half a century - an invitation to join the ACC. In 1953, the Atlantic Coast Conference was formed by seven teams who were then members of the Southern Conference (Clemson, Duke, Maryland, North Carolina, North Carolina State, South Carolina, and Wake Forest. Conference officials expressed interest in adding an eighth member, and candidates mentioned were Virginia and West Virginia. On December 4, 1953, officials convened in Greensboro, North Carolina, and admitted Virginia, a former Southern Conference charter member that had been independent since 1937, into the conference. News reports said that not only was West Virginia turned down, but so was Virginia Tech.

Tech fans spent much of the next 25 years watching ACC basketball on Saturday afternoons and Wednesday evenings before their hopes were raised again in 1977, five years after South Carolina left the league with only seven members. On May 2, 1977, after making a required site visit to Blacksburg to evaluate Tech's formal application, the ACC took its first vote on expansion since Virginia was admitted in 1953. Tech did not receive the requisite five votes of the seven league teams. A year later, Georgia Tech was tapped to be the league's eighth member, expanding its footprint into the lucrative Atlanta television market.

Another ACC/Tech flirtation occurred in 1999 when the Big East sought to bring Miami into the conference mix. Miami ultimately decided to stay in the Big East, and the Hokies were subsequently admitted as a full members of the Big East.

Just three years after Tech joined the Big East as full members, the ACC and Big East began a standoff that ultimately entered the courts, and governor's mansions. On May 16, 2003, the ACC voted 8–1 to enter into formal discussions with Miami, Syracuse, and Boston College, leaving Virginia Tech out of the mix. On June 6, 2003, Big East members Tech, Rutgers, Connecticut, Pittsburgh, and West Virginia, entered into a suit against the ACC and two of the three proposed defectors - Miami and Boston College. (Syracuse was not named as a defendant because the plaintiffs found no examples of promises by Syracuse on which they made financial decisions). The lawsuit charged that the defendants conspired "on a scheme that is calculated to destroy the Big East and misappropriate its value for their benefit."

By June 18, 2003, it became clear that the original expansion plan would not receive the required seven votes of the nine voting schools - meaning at least three schools were holding out. University of Virginia President John Casteen had been a strong advocate of the Hokies and was vocally one of the hold-outs, likely the original "no" vote on May 16 when the Hokies were excluded. Virginia governor Mark Warner reportedly pressured the University of Virginia Board of Visitors (who serve as the supervisor of the university president and are appointed by the governor) to allow Casteen to continue his strong advocacy of the Hokies. Another "no" vote was likely Georgia Tech, whose president was Wayne Clough, a man who been on the faculty of Virginia Tech between 1982 and 1994, including as Dean of Engineering starting in 1990.

Clough was the individual who visited with Virginia Tech president Charles Steger to officially deliver the news of the ACC change of heart on June 18. (Clough maintained his home in Blacksburg after he left the university). The third ACC university that was likely supportive of the Hokies to the point of vetoing a bid to Miami, Boston College, and Syracuse was Wake Forest University The school is geographically closest to Blacksburg (in Winston-Salem, NC), but as a small private school had little in common with Tech. However, several academic relationships were forged after the 1999 Tech/ACC negotiations. When Tech finally got the seven necessary votes for invitation, the biggest surprise was that Syracuse and Boston College were left out of the mix. Boston College was invited to the ACC just months later, on October 12, 2003. Syracuse wasn't invited to join the conference until 2011. (It joined along with Pittsburgh, which had been one of the co-plaintiffs in Tech's suit against the ACC. West Virginia left the Big East for the Big 12 that same year. Another co-plaintiff, Rutgers went to the Big 10 in 2014. The fifth co-plaintiff, Connecticut, stayed with the Big East until its football members became the American Athletic Conference in 2013).

=== Moving past the conference wars ===
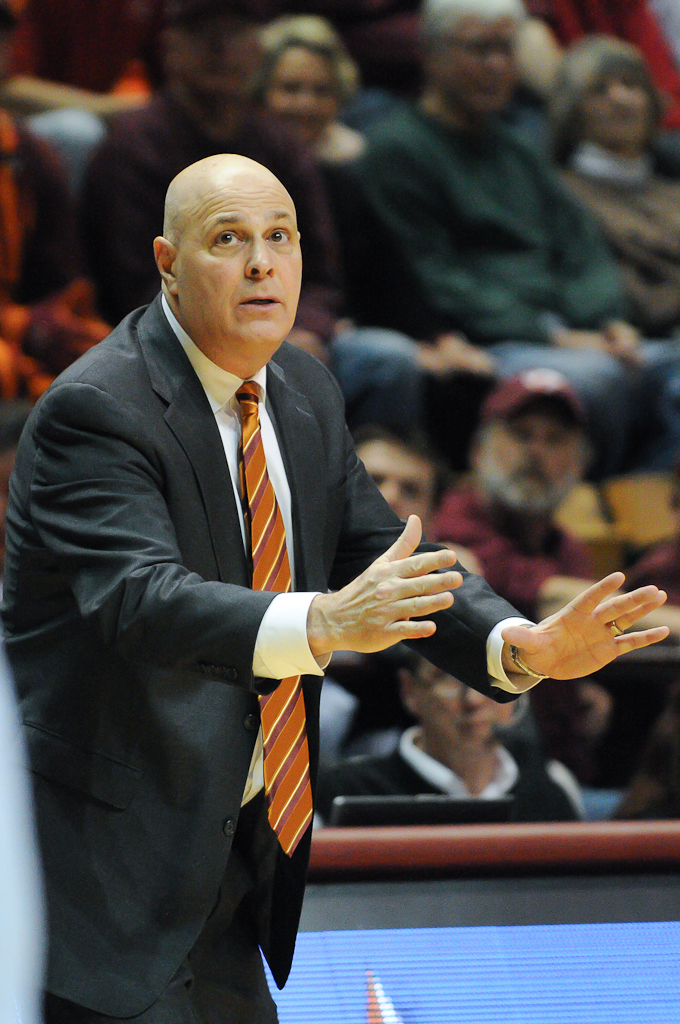
Seth Greenberg was named ACC Coach of the Year in 2005 and 2008.

Before the conference controversies were settled, Tech had hired a new head coach to replace Stokes. Seth Greenberg, who was head coach at South Florida, was hired prior to the 2003–04 season. Tech had its first winning record since 1999–2000 under Greenberg, going 15–14 and advancing to its first Big East basketball tournament in Madison Square Garden. The Big East had expanded its tournament to include all teams for the first time, but since Tech finished eight in the conference with a 7–9 record, it would have made the tournament under the old format.

Tech's first season in the ACC resulted in an 8–8 conference record, good enough for a fourth seed and first-round bye in the 11-team conference tournament. Greenburg was named ACC Coach of the Year, and the Hokies advanced to their first post-season tournament since 1995. Tech beat Temple at home in the first round of the NIT, before falling to former Metro rival Memphis.

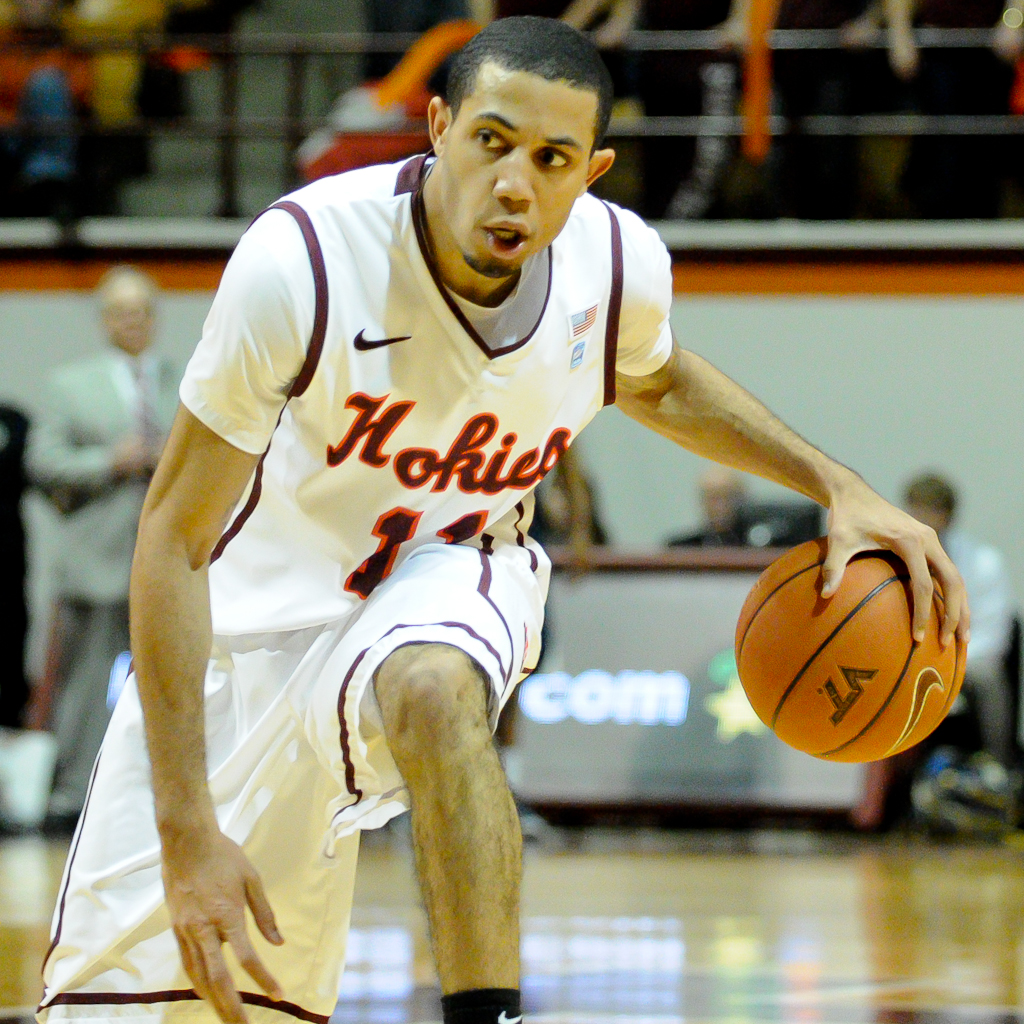
Erick Green led the nation in scoring and was named ACC Player of the Year by the conference media in 2012–13.

After a down year in 2005–06, Tech surged for the next five years. During the 2006–07 season, Virginia Tech beat Duke at Cameron Indoor Stadium and also beat top-ranked North Carolina in Blacksburg. The Hokies went on to beat fourth-ranked North Carolina in Chapel Hill that same season. The Hokies earned a bid to the NCAA tournament that season as a No. 5 seed and beat Illinois before losing to Southern Illinois. It ended the year with a 22–10 record, the first time Tech had crossed the 20-win mark since the 1995–1996 season, when it also went to the NCAA tournament.

In January 2009, Virginia Tech beat No. 1-ranked Wake Forest, the last unbeaten team in Division I in the 2008–09 season, marking the Hokies fourth defeat of a top-ranked team. The Hokies finished the 2009–10 season with a record of 23–8 and were snubbed for the NCAA tournament partially because they had one of the worst nonconference schedule strengths in recent memory. They received a bid to the NIT where they advanced to the third round before losing to Rhode Island. The following year Virginia Tech added another victory over a top-ranked team on February 26, 2011, when it beat No. 1 Duke, 64–60 in Cassell Coliseum. But, they again received a bid to the NIT, just missing out on the NCAA tournament.

After a disappointing 2011–12 season and after nine seasons with a record of 170–123 at Virginia Tech, Greenberg was fired. James Johnson replaced him shortly thereafter. Greenberg has the second most wins all-time at Virginia Tech behind Moir.

The Hokies beat 15th-ranked Oklahoma State on December 1, 2012. Star Erick Green led the team to its first non-conference home defeat of a ranked opponent since 1995 by scoring 28 points. After two seasons with a record of 22–41, Johnson was fired.

=== Buzz Williams takes Hokies to three straight NCAA tournaments and a Sweet 16 ===
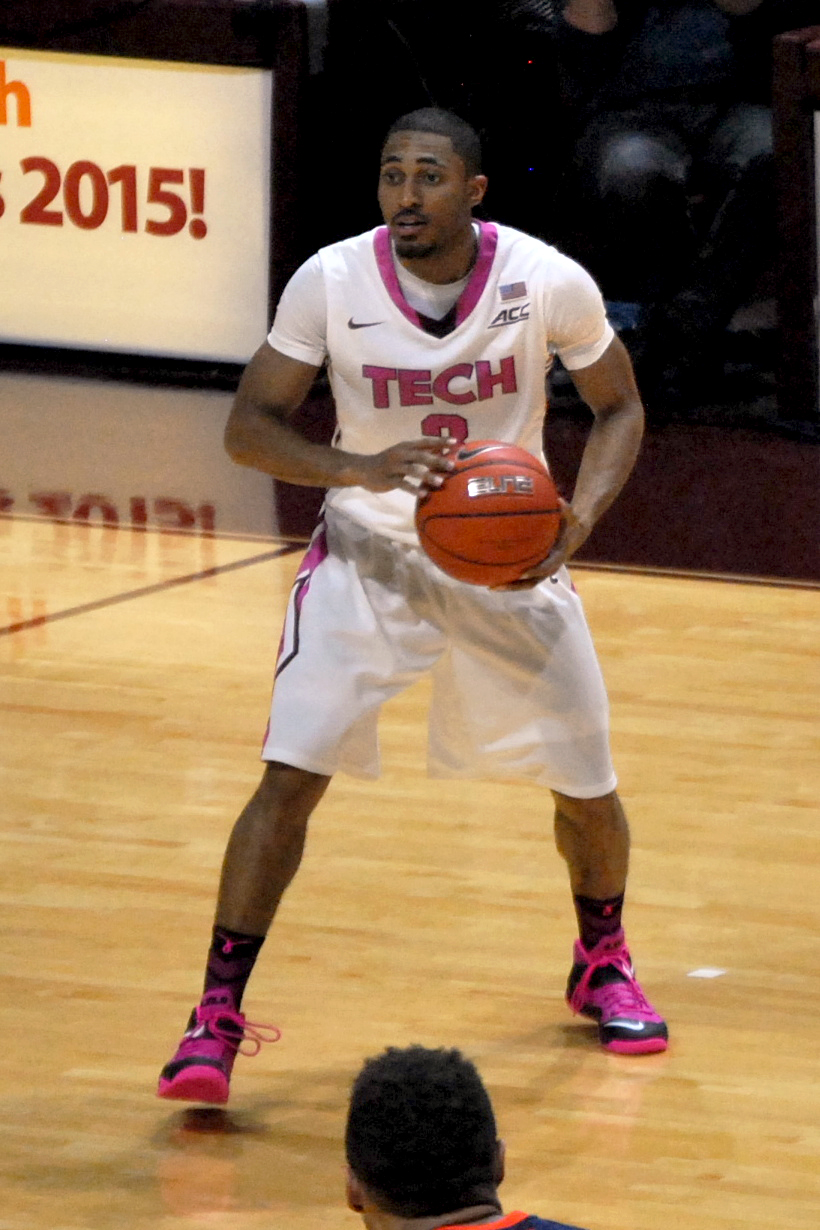
Adam Smith working the ball (2015).

Virginia Tech hired Marquette head coach Buzz Williams as head basketball coach on March 24, 2014. Though the 2014–15 season was difficult, the 2015–16 team finished with a 20–15 record and advanced to the second round of the NIT. Finally, in 2016–17, the Hokies broke through and earned a trip to the NCAA tournament as a No. 9 seed, falling to Wisconsin in the first round.

The 2018–19 season saw the Hokies defeat Duke for the third consecutive time in Blacksburg. On February 2, 2019, No. 12-ranked Virginia Tech won 47-24 against NC State, setting the record for the lowest scoring game involving a ranked team since the introduction of the shot clock. The Hokies ended the season at 24–8 (12–6 ACC), receiving the 5th seed in the Conference tournament giving them a first-round bye. They played Miami for the second time in a week in the second round, winning the game, setting up a rematch with Florida State in the quarter finals. Florida State won 65–63 in overtime. They received a bid to the NCAA Tournament as the 4th seed in the East Region. Wins over 13th seeded St. Louis and 12th seeded Liberty set a rematch with Duke in the Sweet 16. The Hokies fell to the Blue Devils, 75–73, finishing the season at 26–9.

Williams was announced as the new head basketball coach at Texas A&M on April 3, 2019. Texas A&M was required to pay Virginia Tech $750,000 in lieu of Williams completing his contract with the Hokies.

=== Mike Young guides Tech to ACC Tournament firsts ===
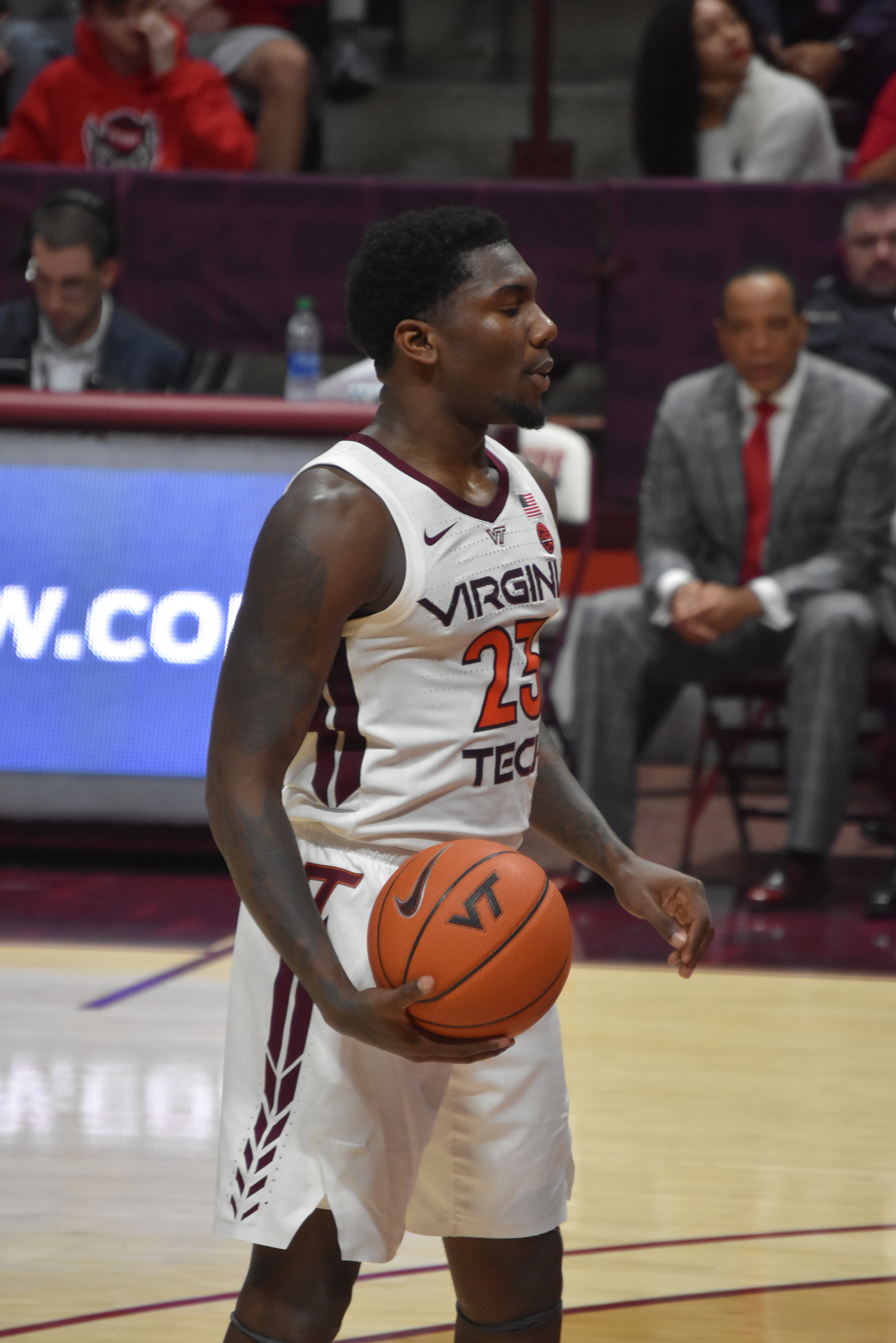
Tyrece Radford, in 2020

On April 7, 2019, Virginia Tech announced the hiring of former Wofford coach Mike Young to lead the program. In his second season as head coach, Mike Young guided the Hokies to their first ever double-bye in the ACC Men's Basketball Tournament and a fourth consecutive berth in the NCAA men's basketball tournament. (In his first season, the 2020 tournament was canceled due to the COVID-19 pandemic in the United States.)

On March 12, 2022, Young coached the Hokies to the ACC tournament championship for the first time in school history. Tech won 82–67 over regular season champion Duke. The game was Mike Krzyzewski's final ACC tournament game, and his 22nd time in the championship game. It was Tech's first time in the championship. To get to the final night, they had to go into overtime to beat Clemson, then bested second seed Notre Dame, and third-seeded North Carolina. The Hokies became the lowest seeded team in history to win the tournament. By winning the ACC tournament, Tech earned its fifth straight berth in the NCAA tournament. It was only the second conference tourney championship for the Hokies, which won the Metro Conference tournament in 1979.

== Retired numbers ==
Virginia Tech has retired four jersey numbers.

Virginia Tech Hokies retired numbers
| No. | Player | Pos. | Career | No. ret. | Ref. |
| 12 | Bimbo Coles | PG | 1986–1990 | 1990 | |
| 20 | Ace Custis | F | 1993–1997 | 1997 | |
| 30 | Dell Curry | G | 1982–1986 | 1986 | |
| 44 | Allan Bristow | F / G | 1970–1973 | 1998 | |

== Postseason results ==
=== NCAA tournament results ===
The Hokies have appeared in 13 NCAA tournaments. Their combined record is 8–13.

| Year | Round | Opponent | Result/Score |
|---|---|---|---|
| 1967 | First round Sweet Sixteen; Elite Eight | Toledo; Indiana; Dayton | W 82–76; W 79–70; L 66–71 |
| 1976 | First round | Western Michigan | L 67–77^{OT} |
| 1979 | First round Second round | Jacksonville; Indiana State | W 70–53; L 69–86 |
| 1980 | First round Second round | Western Kentucky; Indiana | W 89–85^{OT} L 59–68 |
| 1985 | First round | Temple | L 57–60 |
| 1986 | First round | Villanova | L 62–71 |
| 1996 | First round Second round | UW–Green Bay; Kentucky | W 61–49; L 60–84 |
| 2007 | First round Second round | Illinois; Southern Illinois | W 54–52; L 48–63 |
| 2017 | First round | Wisconsin | L 74–84 |
| 2018 | First round | Alabama | L 83–86 |
| 2019 | First round Second round Sweet Sixteen | Saint Louis; Liberty; Duke | W 66–52; W 67–58; L 73–75 |
| 2021 | First round | Florida | L 70–75^{OT} |
| 2022 | First round | Texas | L 73–81 |

=== NIT results ===
The Hokies have appeared in 15 National Invitation Tournaments. Their combined record is 26–13. They were NIT champions in 1973 and 1995.

| Year | Round | Opponent | Result/Score |
|---|---|---|---|
| 1966 | First round | Temple | L 73–88 |
| 1973 | First round Quarterfinals; Semifinals; Final | New Mexico; Fairfield; Alabama; Notre Dame | W 65–63; W 77–76; W 74–73; W 92–91OT |
| 1977 | First round Quarterfinals | Georgetown; Alabama | W 83–79; L 72–79 |
| 1982 | First round Second round Quarterfinals | Fordham; Mississippi; Georgia | W 69–58; W 61–59; L 73–90 |
| 1983 | First round Second round | William & Mary; South Carolina | W 85–79; L 75–76 |
| 1984 | First round Second round Quarterfinals; Semifinals third-place game | Georgia Tech; South Alabama; Tennessee; Michigan; Louisiana-Lafayette | W 77–74; W 68–66; W 72–68; L 75–78; W 71–70 |
| 1995 | First round Second round Quarterfinals; Semifinals; Final | Clemson; Providence; New Mexico State; Canisius; Marquette | W 62–54; W 91–78; W 64–61; W 71–59; W 65–64 |
| 2005 | First round Second round | Temple; Memphis | W 60–50; L 62–83 |
| 2008 | First round Second round Quarterfinals | Morgan State; UAB; Mississippi | W 94–62; W 75–49; L 72–81 |
| 2009 | First round Second round | Duquesne; Baylor | W 116–108^{2OT} L 66–84 |
| 2010 | First round Second round Quarterfinals | Quinnipiac; Connecticut; Rhode Island | W 81–61; W 65–63; L 72–79 |
| 2011 | First round Second round | Bethune-Cookman; Wichita State | W 79–54; L 76–79^{OT} |
| 2016 | First round Second round | Princeton; BYU | W 86–81^{OT} L 77–80 |
| 2023 | First round | Cincinnati | L 72–81 |
| 2024 | First round Second round | Richmond; Ohio State | W 74–58; L 73–81 |

== Rivalries ==
=== Virginia Cavaliers ===
As the Commonwealth's two power conference teams, the Hokies and Cavaliers have a long-standing rivalry. When the teams were in separate conferences this rivalry often played out on neutral courts across the Commonwealth, such as in Richmond, Roanoke, and Hampton. UVA leads the series 99–61 as of 2025.

== Statistics ==
Statistics updated as of 2020–21 season

=== All-time leaders ===
==== Points ====
| Rank | Player | Career | Points |
|---|---|---|---|
| 1. | Bimbo Coles | 1986–90 | 2,484 |
| 2. | Dell Curry | 1982–86 | 2,389 |
| 3. | Malcolm Delaney | 2007–11 | 2,255 |
| 4. | Dale Solomon | 1978–82 | 2,136 |
| 5. | Perry Young | 1981–85 | 1,899 |
| 6. | Ángel Daniel Vassallo | 2005–09 | 1,822 |
| 7. | Allan Bristow | 1970–73 | 1,804 |
| 8. | Zabian Dowdell | 2003–07 | 1,785 |
| 9. | Bob Ayersman | 1957–61 | 1,782 |
| 10. | Erick Green | 2009–13 | 1,742 |

==== Rebounds ====
| Rank | Player | Career | Rebounds |
|---|---|---|---|
| 1. | Chris Smith | 1957–61 | 1,508 |
| 2. | Bill Matthews | 1952–56 | 1,379 |
| 3. | Ace Custis | 1993–97 | 1,177 |
| 4. | Jeff Allen | 2007–11 | 1,111 |
| 5. | Allan Bristow | 1970–73 | 987 |
| 6. | John Rivers | 1988–92 | 903 |
| 7. | Dale Solomon | 1978–82 | 856 |
| 8. | Wayne Robinson | 1976–80 | 852 |
| 9. | Bobby Beecher | 1982–86 | 797 |
| 10. | Perry Young | 1981–85 | 779 |

==== Assists ====
| Rank | Player | Career | Assists |
|---|---|---|---|
| 1. | Justin Robinson | 2015–19 | 562 |
| 2. | Bimbo Coles | 1986–90 | 547 |
| 3. | Malcolm Delaney | 2007–11 | 543 |
| 4. | Jamon Gordon | 2003–07 | 514 |
| 5. | Al Young | 1981–85 | 468 |
| 6. | Devin Wilson | 2013–18 | 414 |
| 7. | Dell Curry | 1982–86 | 407 |
| 8. | Zabian Dowdell | 2003–07 | 380 |
| 9. | Jay Purcell | 1990–94 | 369 |
| 10. | Brendan Dunlop | 1996–00 | 329 |

==== Steals ====
| Rank | Player | Career | Steals |
|---|---|---|---|
| 1. | Dell Curry | 1982–86 | 295 |
| 2. | Jamon Gordon | 2003–07 | 290 |
| 3. | Zabian Dowdell | 2003–07 | 241 |
| 4. | Jeff Allen | 2007–11 | 233 |
| 5. | Bimbo Coles | 1986–90 | 216 |
| 6. | Al Young | 1981–85 | 201 |
| 7. | Ace Custis | 1994–97 | 199 |
| 8. | Reggie Steppe | 1979–83 | 197 |
| 9. | Bryant Matthews | 2000–04 | 184 |
| 10. | Carlos Dixon | 2000–05 | 183 |

==== Blocks ====
| Rank | Player | Career | Blocks |
|---|---|---|---|
| 1. | Roy Brow | 1984–88 | 251 |
| 2. | Jimmy Carruth | 1990–94 | 194 |
| 3. | Bobby Beecher | 1982–86 | 170 |
| 4. | Rolan Roberts | 1997–00 | 167 |
| 5. | Jeff Allen | 2007–11 | 150 |
| 6. | Cheick Diakite | 2005–09 | 125 |
| 7. | Wayne Robinson | 1976–80 | 119 |
| 8. | Deron Washington | 2004–08 | 115 |
| 9. | Les Henson | 1976–80 | 109 |
| 10. | John Rivers | 1988–92 | 108 |

== Current coaching staff ==
- Mike Young – Head Coach
- Christian Webster – Assistant Coach
- Kevin Giltner – Assistant Coach
- Matt Olinger – Special Assistant for Recruiting
- Ace Custis – Special Assistant to Head Coach
- Ryan Nadeau – Video Coordinator
- David Jackson – Strength and Conditioning
