= 2010–11 Kent State Golden Flashes men's basketball team =

American college basketball season

2010–11 Kent State Golden Flashes men's basketball

MAC East Division Champions MAC Regular Season Champions

NIT, Quarterfinals
- Conference: Mid-American Conference
- East Division
- Record: 25–12 (12–4 MAC)
- Head coach: Geno Ford (3rd season)
- Associate head coach: Rob Senderoff (3rd season)
- Assistant coaches: Bobby Steinburg; Jordan Mincy
- Home arena: Memorial Athletic and Convocation Center

2010–11 Mid-American Conference men's basketball standings
| | Conf. | | | | Overall |
| Team | W | | L | PCT | W | | L | PCT |
|---|---|---|---|---|---|---|---|---|
East
| Kent State | 12 | – | 4 | .750 | 25 | – | 12 | .676 |
| Miami (OH) | 11 | – | 5 | .688 | 16 | – | 17 | .485 |
| Ohio | 9 | – | 7 | .563 | 19 | – | 16 | .543 |
| Akron † | 9 | – | 7 | .563 | 23 | – | 13 | .639 |
| Bowling Green | 8 | – | 8 | .500 | 14 | – | 19 | .424 |
| Buffalo | 8 | – | 8 | .500 | 20 | – | 14 | .588 |
West
| Western Michigan | 11 | – | 5 | .688 | 21 | – | 13 | .618 |
| Ball State | 10 | – | 6 | .625 | 19 | – | 13 | .594 |
| Central Michigan | 7 | – | 9 | .438 | 10 | – | 21 | .323 |
| Northern Illinois | 5 | – | 11 | .313 | 9 | – | 21 | .300 |
| Eastern Michigan | 5 | – | 11 | .313 | 9 | – | 22 | .290 |
| Toledo | 1 | – | 15 | .063 | 4 | – | 28 | .125 |
† Conference tournament winner Rankings from AP Poll

The 2010–11 Kent State Golden Flashes men's basketball team represented Kent State University in the college basketball season of 2010–11. The team was coached by Geno Ford and played their home games at the Memorial Athletic and Convocation Center as members of the Mid-American Conference (MAC) East Division. On March 4, 2011, the team clinched their second-consecutive outright MAC regular season championship by defeating the Akron Zips 79–68 in Kent. It was the first back-to-back regular season titles in the MAC since Miami accomplished the feat in 1991 and 1992 and first back-to-back outright titles since Ball State in 1989 and 1990.

== Before the season ==
=== Recruiting ===
College recruiting
| Name | Hometown | School | Height | Weight | Commit date |
|---|---|---|---|---|---|
| Kenny Knight; PF | Cincinnati | Aiken High School | 6 ft 6 in (1.98 m) | 210 lb (95 kg) | Jan 18, 2009 |
| Kenny Knight; PF | Recruit ratings: Scout: (86) | | | | |
| Eric Gaines; SG | Englewood, Illinois | Hillcrest High School | 6 ft 4 in (1.93 m) | 180 lb (82 kg) | Aug 3, 2009 |
| Eric Gaines; SG | Recruit ratings: (85) | | | | |
| Mark Henniger; PF | Massillon, Ohio | Jackson High School | 6 ft 8 in (2.03 m) | 200 lb (91 kg) | May 13, 2009 |
| Mark Henniger; PF | Recruit ratings: (85) | | | | |
| Darius Leonard; PF | Raleigh, North Carolina | Kestrel Heights School | 6 ft 7 in (2.01 m) | 215 lb (98 kg) | |
| Darius Leonard; PF | Recruit ratings: (85) | | | | |
| Carlton Guyton; SG | Chicago | Mineral Area College | 6 ft 4 in (1.93 m) | 175 lb (79 kg) | |
| Carlton Guyton; SG | Recruit ratings: (84) | | | | |
| DeAndre Nealy; PF | Detroit | Mott Community College | 6 ft 6 in (1.98 m) | 230 lb (100 kg) | Nov 11, 2009 |
| DeAndre Nealy; PF | Recruit ratings: Scout: (40) | | | | |
| Michael Porrini; SG | Massillon, Ohio | Gulf Coast Community College | 6 ft 2 in (1.88 m) | 200 lb (91 kg) | Feb 2, 2010 |
| Michael Porrini; SG | Recruit ratings: (40) | | | | |
Overall recruit ranking:
Note: In many cases, Scout, Rivals, 247Sports, On3, and ESPN may conflict in their listings of height and weight.; In these cases, the average was taken. ESPN grades are on a 100-point scale.; Sources: "Kent State Commit List for 2010". Rivals.; "Scout.com: Men's Basketball Recruiting". Scout.; "Kent State Basketball Recruiting 2010". ESPN.; "Scout.com Team Recruiting Rankings". Scout.; "2010 Team Ranking". Rivals.

== Roster ==
2010–11 Kent State Golden Flashes men's basketball team
Players
Coaches

| Pos. | # | Name | Height | Weight | Year | Hometown |
|---|---|---|---|---|---|---|
| G | 1 | Eric Gaines | 6 ft 4 in (1.93 m) | 180 lb (82 kg) | Fr | Chicago |
| G | 2 | Michael Porrini | 6 ft 2 in (1.88 m) | 200 lb (91 kg) | Jr | Massillon, Ohio |
| G | 3 | Randall Holt | 6 ft 1 in (1.85 m) | 180 lb (82 kg) | So | Cleveland |
| G | 11 | Carlton Guyton | 6 ft 4 in (1.93 m) | 174 lb (79 kg) | Jr | Chicago |
| F | 13 | Mark Henniger | 6 ft 8 in (2.03 m) | 215 lb (98 kg) | Fr | Massillon, Ohio |
| F | 15 | DeAndre Nealy | 6 ft 6 in (1.98 m) | 250 lb (113 kg) | Jr | Detroit |
| F | 22 | Darius Leonard | 6 ft 9 in (2.06 m) | 215 lb (98 kg) | Fr | Raleigh, North Carolina |
| F | 23 | Patrick Jackson | 6 ft 6 in (1.98 m) | 215 lb (98 kg) | Fr | Brooklyn, New York |
| G | 25 | Jordan Wilds | 6 ft 5 in (1.96 m) | 190 lb (86 kg) | So | Hermitage, Pennsylvania |
| F | 30 | Brian Frank | 6 ft 5 in (1.96 m) | 215 lb (98 kg) | So | Gainesville, Florida |
| G | 32 | Rodriguez Sherman | 6 ft 3 in (1.91 m) | 185 lb (84 kg) | Sr | Indianapolis |
| C | 33 | Justin Manns | 6 ft 11 in (2.11 m) | 220 lb (100 kg) | Jr | Winston-Salem, North Carolina |
| F | 34 | Justin Greene | 6 ft 8 in (2.03 m) | 230 lb (104 kg) | Jr | Brooklyn, New York |

Head coach

- Geno Ford

Assistant coach(es)

- Rob Senderoff
- Bobby Steinburg
- Jordan Mincy

Legend

- (C) Team captain
- (S) Suspended
- (I) Ineligible
- (W) Walk-on
- Injured
- Current redshirt

Roster
Last update: March 6, 2011

== Coaching staff ==
| Name | Position | College | Graduating year |
|---|---|---|---|
| Geno Ford | Head coach | Ohio University | 1997 |
| Rob Senderoff | Associate Head Coach | University of Albany | 1995 |
| Bobby Steinburg | Assistant coach | Middle Tennessee State University | 1997 |
| Jordan Mincy | Assistant coach | Kent State University | 2009 |
| Jaden Uken | Director of Operations | University of Nebraska–Lincoln | 2003 |

== Schedule ==
| Date time, TV | Rank^{#} | Opponent^{#} | Result | Record | Site (attendance) city, state |
Exhibition
| November 5*; 7:00 pm | | Rochester (MI) | W 81–44; Stats | | Memorial Athletic and Convocation Center (1,150); Kent, Ohio |
Regular Season
| November 12*; 5:00 pm | | vs. Iona; World Vision Classic | W 73–72; Stats | 1–0 | Wolstein Center (1,450); Cleveland, Ohio |
| November 13*; 3:30 pm | | vs. Bryant; World Vision Classic | W 90–49; Stats | 2–0 | Wolstein Center (NA); Cleveland, Ohio |
| November 14*; 6:00 pm | | at Cleveland State; World Vision Classic | L 66–69; Stats | 2–1 | Wolstein Center (2,805); Cleveland, Ohio |
| November 16*; 8:00 am, ESPN | | Robert Morris; ESPN Tip-Off Marathon | W 62–59; Stats | 3–1 | Memorial Athletic and Convocation Center (1,496); Kent, Ohio |
| November 19*; 7:00 pm | | Furman | W 78–74; Stats ^{OT} | 4–1 | Memorial Athletic and Convocation Center (3,423); Kent, Ohio |
| November 23*; 5:00 pm | | vs. Urbana; World Vision Classic | W 94–71; Stats | 5–1 | Wolstein Center (188); Cleveland, Ohio |
| December 4*; 2:00 pm | | Lehigh | W 80–75; Stats | 6–1 | Memorial Athletic and Convocation Center (3,421); Kent, Ohio |
| December 2*; 7:00 pm | | Louisiana–Monroe | W 69–53; Stats | 7–1 | Memorial Athletic and Convocation Center (3,351); Kent, Ohio |
| December 5*; 7:00 pm | | at UAB | L 59–75; Stats | 7–2 | Bartow Arena (3,151); Birmingham, Alabama |
| December 9*; 7:00 pm, ESPN2 | | at No. 24 Florida | L 52–65; Stats | 7–3 | O'Connell Center (7,522); Gainesville, Florida |
| December 12*; 6:30 pm, ESPNU | | at South Florida | W 56–51; Stats | 8–3 | Memorial Athletic and Convocation Center (3,183); Kent, Ohio |
| December 21*; 7:00 pm | | Youngstown State | W 71–58; Stats | 9–3 | Memorial Athletic and Convocation Center (3,450); Kent, Ohio |
| December 28*; 7:00 pm | | at Morehead State | L 59–76; Stats | 9–4 | Ellis Johnson Arena (2,328); Morehead, Kentucky |
| December 31*; 2:00 pm | | James Madison | L 51–60; Stats | 9–5 | Memorial Athletic and Convocation Center (2,862); Kent, Ohio |
| January 8; 7:00 pm, STO | | at Akron | L 62–65; Stats | 9–6 (0–1) | James A. Rhodes Arena (5,019); Akron, Ohio |
| January 11; 7:00 pm | | Bowling Green | W 80–63; Stats | 10–6 (1–1) | Memorial Athletic and Convocation Center (2,543); Kent, Ohio |
| January 15; 7:00 pm | | at Ohio | W 69–66; Stats | 11–6 (2–1) | Convocation Center (8,022); Athens, Ohio |
| January 19; 7:30 pm, STO | | at Buffalo | L 54–79; Stats | 11–7 (2–2) | Alumni Arena (2,112); Buffalo, New York |
| January 23; 2:00 pm, STO | | Miami (OH) | W 78–57; Stats | 12–7 (3–2) | Memorial Athletic and Convocation Center (4,135); Kent, Ohio |
| January 27; 7:05 pm | | at Ball State | W 66–53; Stats | 13–7 (4–2) | John E. Worthen Arena (3,310); Muncie, Indiana |
| January 30; 2:05 pm, STO | | Toledo | W 72–55; Stats | 14–7 (5–2) | Memorial Athletic and Convocation Center (2,842); Kent, Ohio |
| February 5; 7:30 pm, ESPNU | | Central Michigan | W 66–53; Stats | 15–7 (6–2) | Memorial Athletic and Convocation Center (3,921); Kent, Ohio |
| February 9; 7:00 pm | | Eastern Michigan | W 80–70; Stats | 16–7 (7–2) | Memorial Athletic and Convocation Center (2,756); Kent, Ohio |
| February 12; 3:00 pm | | at Northern Illinois | W 84–77; Stats | 17–7 (8–2) | Convocation Center (2,169); DeKalb, Illinois |
| February 16; 7:00 pm | | at Miami (OH) | L 80–86; Stats ^{OT} | 17–8 (8–3) | Millett Hall (2,173); Oxford, Ohio |
| February 18*; 9:00 pm, ESPNU | | at Drexel; ESPN BracketBusters | L 66–73; Stats | 17–9 | Daskalakis Athletic Center (2,534); Philadelphia, Pennsylvania |
| February 21; 7:00 pm | | at Western Michigan | W 74–72; Stats | 18–9 (9–3) | University Arena (2,363); Kalamazoo, Michigan |
| February 24; 7:00 pm, STO | | Buffalo | W 72–69; Stats | 19–9 (10–3) | Memorial Athletic and Convocation Center (3,127); Kent, Ohio |
| February 26; 7:00 pm | | Ohio | L 87–88; Stats ^{OT} | 19–10 (10–4) | Memorial Athletic and Convocation Center (5,125); Kent, Ohio |
| March 1; 7:00 pm, STO | | at Bowling Green | W 63–57; Stats | 20–10 (11–4) | Anderson Arena (1,751); Bowling Green, Ohio |
| March 4; 7:00 pm, ESPN2 | | Akron | W 79–68; Stats | 21–10 (12–4) | Memorial Athletic and Convocation Center (6,327); Kent, Ohio |
Mid-American Conference tournament
| March 10; 7:00 pm, STO | | vs. Buffalo; Quarterfinals | W 73–62; Stats | 22–10 | Quicken Loans Arena (NA); Cleveland, Ohio |
| March 11; 9:30 pm, STO | | vs. Ball State; Semifinals | W 79–68; Stats | 23–10 | Quicken Loans Arena (6,174); Cleveland, Ohio |
| March 12; 6:00 pm, ESPN2 | | vs. Akron; Championship Game | L 65–66; Stats ^{OT} | 23–11 | Quicken Loans Arena (8,926); Cleveland, Ohio |
2011 NIT
| March 15*; 11:00 pm, ESPN2 | | at Saint Mary's; First Round | W 71–70; Stats | 24–11 | McKeon Pavilion (2,443); Moraga, California |
| March 20*; 12:30 pm, ESPNU | | at Fairfield; Second Round | W 72–68; Stats | 25–11 | Webster Bank Arena (3,954); Bridgeport, Connecticut |
| March 22*; 9:00 pm, ESPN | | at Colorado; Quarterfinals | L 74–81 Stats | 25–12 | Coors Events Center (9,065); Boulder, Colorado |
*Non-Conference Game. ^{#}Rankings from AP Poll. All times are in Eastern Time Zone.

== After the season ==
=== Comments ===
Following their overtime loss to Akron in the MAC tournament championship game, the team was seeded 7th in the 2011 National Invitation Tournament, which they automatically qualified for by winning the MAC regular season championship. They played in Moraga, California at 2nd-seeded St. Mary's, and defeated the Gaels 71–70. Kent State next traveled across the country to face 6th-seeded Fairfield, and defeated the Stags in Bridgeport, Connecticut 72–68. The win advanced Kent State to the NIT quarterfinals for the first time since 2000. In the quarterfinals, they played top-seeded Colorado, and lost to the Buffaloes 81–74 in Boulder, Colorado to finish the season with an overall record of 25–12.

On March 27, Bradley University announced they had hired Geno Ford to become their next head coach.

=== Awards ===
On March 7, 2011, head coach Geno Ford was named the Coach of the Year in the Mid-American Conference while Junior forward Justin Greene was named the conference Player of the Year. It was Ford's second consecutive Coach of the Year award and marks the eighth time a KSU coach has won the award (Jim McDonald, 1990; Gary Waters, 1999 and 2000; Stan Heath, 2002; and Jim Christian, 2006 and 2008). Ford also became the fourth coach in MAC history to win back-to-back Coach of the Year awards and won the award by one vote over Miami's Charlie Coles. Greene was the first KSU player since Al Fisher in 2008 to be named Player of the Year and the third Kent State player overall to win the award, joining DeAndre Haynes in 2006. Greene won the award by three votes over Julian Muvunga of Miami and D. J. Cooper of Ohio.

On March 8, Kent State players Michael Porrini and Carlton Guyton were honored by the Mid-American Conference as Porrini was named MAC Defensive Player of the Year and Guyton was named MAC Sixth Man of the Year. Porrini was the fourth Kent State player to earn the award and marked the fifth Defensive Player of the Year award for Kent State (Demertic Shaw; 2001 and 2002; John Edwards, 2004; and Haminn Quaintance, 2008). Guyton was the third KSU player to win the Sixth Man award, after Anthony Simpson in 2010 and Kevin Warzynski in 2006.
