= 2010–11 Mid-American Conference men's basketball season =

- League: NCAA Division I
- Sport: Basketball
- Teams: 12

Regular season
- League champions: Kent State
- Season MVP: Justin Greene

Tournament
- Champions: Akron
- Runners-up: Kent State
- Finals MVP: Zeke Marshall

Mid-American men's basketball seasons
- ← 2009–10 2011–12 →

2010–11 Mid-American Conference men's basketball standings
	Conf.				Overall
Team	W		L	PCT	W		L	PCT
East
Kent State	12	–	4	.750	25	–	12	.676
Miami (OH)	11	–	5	.688	16	–	17	.485
Ohio	9	–	7	.563	19	–	16	.543
Akron †	9	–	7	.563	23	–	13	.639
Bowling Green	8	–	8	.500	14	–	19	.424
Buffalo	8	–	8	.500	20	–	14	.588
West
Western Michigan	11	–	5	.688	21	–	13	.618
Ball State	10	–	6	.625	19	–	13	.594
Central Michigan	7	–	9	.438	10	–	21	.323
Northern Illinois	5	–	11	.313	9	–	21	.300
Eastern Michigan	5	–	11	.313	9	–	22	.290
Toledo	1	–	15	.063	4	–	28	.125
† Conference tournament winner Rankings from AP Poll

The 2010–11 Mid-American Conference men's basketball season began with practices in October 2010, followed by the start of the 2010–11 NCAA Division I men's basketball season in November. Conference play began in January 2011 and concluded in March 2011. Kent State won the regular season title with a conference record of 12–4. Sixth-seeded Akron defeated Kent State in the MAC tournament final in overtime and represented the MAC in the NCAA tournament where they lost in the first round to Notre Dame.

== Preseason awards ==
The preseason poll and league awards were announced by the league office on October 28, 2010.

=== Preseason men's basketball poll ===
(First place votes in parentheses)

==== East Division ====
1. Ohio 128 (12)
2. Kent State 114 (8)
3. Akron 104 (4)
4. Miami 84
5. Bowling Green 42
6. Buffalo 32

==== West Division ====
1. Ball State 124 (12)
2. Central Michigan 122 (8)
3. Eastern Michigan 88 (2)
4. Western Michigan 68
5. Northern Illinois 64 (2)
6. Toledo 38 points

==== Tournament champs ====
Ohio (10), Kent State (6), Central Michigan (4), Ball State (2), Akron (2)

=== Honors ===
Honor	Recipient
Preseason All-MAC East	Brett McKnight, F, Akron
Preseason All-MAC East	Scott Thomas, F, Bowling Green
Preseason All-MAC East	Justin Greene, F, Kent State
Preseason All-MAC East	Julian Mavunga, F, Miami
Preseason All-MAC East	D.J. Cooper, G, Ohio
Preseason All-MAC West	Jarrod Jones, F/C, Ball State
Preseason All-MAC West	Trey Zeigler, G, Central Michigan
Preseason All-MAC West	Brandon Bowdry, F, Eastern Michigan
Preseason All-MAC West	Xavier Silas, G, Northern Illinois
Preseason All-MAC West	Flenard Whitfield, F, Western Michigan

== Postseason ==
=== Postseason awards ===
1. Coach of the Year: Geno Ford, Kent State
2. Player of the Year: Justin Greene, Kent State
3. Freshman of the Year: Javon McCrea, Buffalo
4. Defensive Player of the Year: Michael Porrini, Kent State
5. Sixth Man of the Year: Carlton Guyton, Kent State

=== Honors ===
Honor	Recipient
Postseason All-MAC First Team	Justin Greene, Kent State
Postseason All-MAC First Team	Julian Mavunga, Miami
Postseason All-MAC First Team	D.J. Cooper, Ohio
Postseason All-MAC First Team	Xavier Silas, Northern Illinois
Postseason All-MAC First Team	Jarrod Jones, Ball State
Postseason All-MAC Second Team	Brandon Bowdry, Eastern Michigan
Postseason All-MAC Second Team	Nikola Cvetinovic, Akron
Postseason All-MAC Second Team	Rod Sherman, Kent State
Postseason All-MAC Second Team	Byron Mulkey, Buffalo
Postseason All-MAC Second Team	Demetrius Ward, Western Michigan
Postseason All-MAC Honorable Mention	Zach Filzen, Buffalo
Postseason All-MAC Honorable Mention	Javon McCrea, Buffalo
Postseason All-MAC Honorable Mention	A'uston Calhoun, Bowling Green
Postseason All-MAC Honorable Mention	Scott Thomas, Bowling Green
Postseason All-MAC Honorable Mention	Trey Zeigler, Central Michigan
Postseason All-MAC Honorable Mention	Jalin Thomas, Central Michigan
Postseason All-MAC Honorable Mention	Michael Porrini, Kent State
Postseason All-MAC Honorable Mention	Nick Winbush, Miami
Postseason All-MAC Honorable Mention	DeVaughn Washington, Ohio
Postseason All-MAC Honorable Mention	Flenard Whitfield, Western Michigan
All-MAC Freshman Team	Chris Bond, Ball State
All-MAC Freshman Team	Javon McCrea, Buffalo
All-MAC Freshman Team	Trey Zeigler, Central Michigan
All-MAC Freshman Team	Nick Kellogg, Ohio
All-MAC Freshman Team	Juwan Howard Jr., Western Michigan

== See also ==
2010–11 Mid-American Conference women's basketball season
