= Porrino =

Porrino or Porriño may refer to:

== Places ==
- O Porriño, Galicia, Spain

== Organizations ==
- BM Porriño
- Porriño Industrial FC

== Others ==
- Porrino (surname)
