= 2010–11 Ball State Cardinals men's basketball team =

American college basketball season

2010–11 Ball State Cardinals men's basketball
- Conference: Mid-American Conference
- West Division
- Record: 19–13 (10–6 MAC)
- Head coach: Billy Taylor (4th season)
- Assistant coaches: Bob Simmons; Jay Newberry; Mitch Gilfillan
- Home arena: Worthen Arena

2010–11 Mid-American Conference men's basketball standings
	Conf.				Overall
Team	W		L	PCT	W		L	PCT
East
Kent State	12	–	4	.750	25	–	12	.676
Miami (OH)	11	–	5	.688	16	–	17	.485
Ohio	9	–	7	.563	19	–	16	.543
Akron †	9	–	7	.563	23	–	13	.639
Bowling Green	8	–	8	.500	14	–	19	.424
Buffalo	8	–	8	.500	20	–	14	.588
West
Western Michigan	11	–	5	.688	21	–	13	.618
Ball State	10	–	6	.625	19	–	13	.594
Central Michigan	7	–	9	.438	10	–	21	.323
Northern Illinois	5	–	11	.313	9	–	21	.300
Eastern Michigan	5	–	11	.313	9	–	22	.290
Toledo	1	–	15	.063	4	–	28	.125
† Conference tournament winner Rankings from AP Poll

The 2010–11 Ball State Cardinals men's basketball team represented Ball State University in the 2010–11 NCAA Division I men's basketball season. The team was coached by Billy Taylor and played their homes game in John E. Worthen Arena. They were a member of the West Division of the Mid-American Conference. They finished the season 19–13, 10–6 in MAC play to finish second place in the West Division. They lost in the semifinals of the MAC tournament to Kent State.

== Roster ==
2010–11 Ball State Cardinals men's basketball team
Players
Coaches

Pos.	#	Name	Height	Weight	Year	Hometown
F	1	Malik Perry	6 ft 4 in (1.93 m)	240 lb (109 kg)	Sr	Philadelphia, PA
F	2	Matt Kamieniecki	6 ft 7 in (2.01 m)	228 lb (103 kg)	Fr	Clarkston, MI
G	3	Randy Davis	5 ft 11 in (1.8 m)	180 lb (82 kg)	Jr	Plymouth, IN
G	4	Jauwan Scaife	6 ft 2 in (1.88 m)	204 lb (93 kg)	So	Muncie, IN
F	5	Jay Copeland	6 ft 7 in (2.01 m)	235 lb (107 kg)	Fr	Suffolk, VA
G	12	Tyrae Robinson	6 ft 2 in (1.88 m)	185 lb (84 kg)	Fr	Gary, IN
F	20	Chris Bond	6 ft 4 in (1.93 m)	195 lb (88 kg)	Fr	Gary, IN
G	22	Adrian Tucker	6 ft 2 in (1.88 m)	160 lb (73 kg)	So	New Castle, IN
G	32	Jesse Berry	6 ft 1 in (1.85 m)	189 lb (86 kg)	Fr	Lafayette, IN
G	34	Pierre Sneed	6 ft 4 in (1.93 m)	206 lb (93 kg)	Jr	Chicago, IL
F	44	Franklin Henderson	6 ft 4 in (1.93 m)	185 lb (84 kg)	Jr	Indianapolis, IN
F	44	Tyler Koch	6 ft 5 in (1.96 m)	222 lb (101 kg)	So	Winchester, IN
F	45	Jarrod Jones	6 ft 9 in (2.06 m)	234 lb (106 kg)	Jr	Michigan City, IN
C	50	Zach Fields	6 ft 10 in (2.08 m)	296 lb (134 kg)	RS So	North Vernon, IN

Head coach

- Billy Taylor (Notre Dame)

Assistant coach(es)

- Bob Simmons (Wilkes)
- Jay Newberry (Rollins)
- Mitch Gilfillan (Lehigh)

Legend

- (C) Team captain
- (S) Suspended
- (I) Ineligible
- (W) Walk-on
- Injured
- Current redshirt

Roster
Last update: Sept 27, 2024

== Schedule ==
Date time, TV	Rank^{#}	Opponent^{#}	Result	Record	Site (attendance) city, state
Regular season
Nov. 14*; 3:00 pm		Eastern Illinois	W 77–46	1–0	John E. Worthen Arena (3,125); Muncie, IN
Nov. 17*; 7:00 pm		Indiana State	W 75–60	2–0	John E. Worthen Arena (5,773); Muncie, IN
Nov. 20*; 2:00 pm		at No. 16 Butler	L 55–88	2–1	Hinkle Fieldhouse (7,038); Indianapolis, IN
Nov. 25*; 1:45 am		vs. St. John's; Great Alaska Shootout quarterfinals	L 73–78 ^{OT}	2–2	Sullivan Arena (4,632); Anchorage, AK
Nov. 26*; 4:00 pm		vs. Southern Utah; Great Alaska Shootout consolation 2nd round	W 73–54	3–2	Sullivan Arena (4,525); Anchorage, AK
Nov. 27*; 6:00 pm		at Alaska Anchorage; Great Alaska Shootout fifth place game	L 44–62	3–3	Sullivan Arena (4,701); Anchorage, AK
Dec. 8*; 8:00 pm		at Eastern Illinois	W 58–51	4–3	Lantz Arena (800); Charleston, IL
Dec. 11*; 8:30 pm		at DePaul	W 79–77 ^{OT}	5–3	McGrath Arena (3,454); Chicago, IL
Dec. 21*; 7:00 pm		Mount St. Joseph	W 95–43	6–3	John E. Worthen Arena (2,910); Muncie, IN
Dec. 28*; 8:05 pm		at Valparaiso	L 52–69	6–4	Athletics–Recreation Center (4,476); Valparaiso, IN
Dec. 31*; 12:00 pm		North Carolina A&T	W 80–68	7–4	John E. Worthen Arena (2,906); Muncie, IN
Jan. 3*; 7:00 pm		SIU Edwardsville	W 76–46	8–4	John E. Worthen Arena (2,684); Muncie, IN
Jan. 8; 4:00 pm		at Northern Illinois	W 75–65	9–4 (1–0)	Convocation Center (1,041); DeKalb, IL
Jan. 12; 7:30 pm		Western Michigan	W 72–63	10–4 (2–0)	John E. Worthen Arena (3,601); Muncie, IN
Jan. 15; 2:00 pm		Central Michigan	W 64–55	11–4 (3–0)	John E. Worthen Arena (3,690); Muncie, IN
Jan. 19; 7:00 pm		at Eastern Michigan	W 60–51	12–4 (4–0)	Convocation Center (741); Ypsilanti, MI
Jan. 22; 7:00 pm		at Toledo	W 70–60	13–4 (5–0)	Savage Arena (5,015); Toledo, OH
Jan. 24*; 7:00 pm		Morehead State	L 48–50	13–5	John E. Worthen Arena (3,317); Muncie, IN
Jan. 27; 7:00 pm		Kent State	L 53–66	13–6 (5–1)	John E. Worthen Arena (3,310); Muncie, IN
Jan. 29; 2:00 pm		Ohio	L 60–61	13–7 (5–2)	John E. Worthen Arena (3,976); Muncie, IN
Feb. 1; 7:00 pm		at Miami (OH)	L 75–89	13–8 (5–3)	Millett Hall (1,216); Oxford, OH
Feb. 5; 2:00 pm		Buffalo	W 72–71	14–8 (6–3)	John E. Worthen Arena (3,309); Muncie, IN
Feb. 9; 7:00 pm		at Bowling Green	L 64–65	14–9 (6–4)	Anderson Arena (1,315); Bowling Green, OH
Feb. 12; 7:30 pm		at Akron	L 60–75	14–10 (6–5)	James A. Rhodes Arena (3,401); Akron, OH
Feb. 15; 7:00 pm		Toledo	W 83–62	15–10 (7–5)	John E. Worthen Arena (3,014); Muncie, IN
Feb. 21; 7:00 pm		at Wofford; ESPN BracketBusters	L 61–66	15–11	Benjamin Johnson Arena (1,890); Spartanburg, SC
Feb. 23; 7:00 pm		Eastern Michigan	W 64–49	16–11 (8–5)	John E. Worthen Arena (3,082); Muncie, IN
Feb. 26; 6:30 pm		at Central Michigan	W 65–58	17–11 (9–5)	McGuirk Arena (3,816); Mount Pleasant, MI
Mar. 2; 7:00 pm		at Western Michigan	L 70–87	17–12 (9–6)	University Arena (3,249); Kalamazoo, MI
Mar. 5; 2:00 pm		Northern Illinois	W 67–57	18–12 (10–6)	John E. Worthen Arena (3,222); Muncie, IN
MAC tournament
Mar. 10; 9:30 pm	(4)	vs. (5) Ohio; Quarterfinals	W 76–73	19–12	Quicken Loans Arena (3,615); Cleveland, OH
Mar. 11; 9:30 pm	(4)	vs. (1) Kent State; Semifinals	L 68–79	19–13	Quicken Loans Arena (6,174); Cleveland, OH
*Non-conference game. ^{#}Rankings from AP Poll. (#) Tournament seedings in parentheses. All times are in Eastern Time.
