= 2010–11 Eastern Michigan Eagles men's basketball team =

American college basketball season

2010–11 Eastern Michigan Eagles men's basketball
- Conference: Mid-American Conference
- West Division
- Record: 9-22 (4-11 MAC)
- Head coach: Charles Ramsey
- Assistant coaches: Derrick McDowell; Carl Thomas; Andrew Moore
- Home arena: Convocation Center

2010–11 Mid-American Conference men's basketball standings
	Conf.				Overall
Team	W		L	PCT	W		L	PCT
East
Kent State	12	–	4	.750	25	–	12	.676
Miami (OH)	11	–	5	.688	16	–	17	.485
Ohio	9	–	7	.563	19	–	16	.543
Akron †	9	–	7	.563	23	–	13	.639
Bowling Green	8	–	8	.500	14	–	19	.424
Buffalo	8	–	8	.500	20	–	14	.588
West
Western Michigan	11	–	5	.688	21	–	13	.618
Ball State	10	–	6	.625	19	–	13	.594
Central Michigan	7	–	9	.438	10	–	21	.323
Northern Illinois	5	–	11	.313	9	–	21	.300
Eastern Michigan	5	–	11	.313	9	–	22	.290
Toledo	1	–	15	.063	4	–	28	.125
† Conference tournament winner Rankings from AP Poll

The 2010–11 Eastern Michigan Eagles men's basketball team represented Eastern Michigan University in the college basketball season of 2010–11. The team was coached by 6th year head coach Charles E. Ramsey and played their homes game in Convocation Center. Ramsey was fired at the end of the season.

== Before the season ==
=== Recruiting ===
College recruiting information
Name	Hometown	School	Height	Weight	Commit date
Darrell Lampley; G	Linden, NJ	Linden High School	5 ft 10 in (1.78 m)	N/A	
Darrell Lampley; G	Recruit ratings: No ratings found				
Kenny Stewart; SF	Williamsport, PA	Notre Dame Prep	6 ft 7 in (2.01 m)	190 lb (86 kg)	Apr 20, 2010
Kenny Stewart; SF	Recruit ratings: No ratings found				
Derek Thompson; G	Detroit, MI	Melvindale High School	6 ft 3 in (1.91 m)	185 lb (84 kg)	
Derek Thompson; G	Recruit ratings: No ratings found				
Overall recruit ranking:
Note: In many cases, Scout, Rivals, 247Sports, On3, and ESPN may conflict in their listings of height and weight.; In these cases, the average was taken. ESPN grades are on a 100-point scale.; Sources: "2010 Team Ranking". Rivals.

== Roster ==
Name	Number	Position	Height	Weight	Year	Hometown
Matt Balkema	45	C	6–10	285	Sophomore	Warren, Michigan
Brandon Bowdry	33	F	6–6	230	Senior	St. Louis, Missouri
Adrian Burton	10	G	5–8	170	Sophomore	Detroit, Michigan
Will Cooper	15	W	6–6	180	Senior	Detroit, Michigan
Quintin Dailey	21	G	6–3	175	Junior	Las Vegas, Nevada
Jake Fosdick	5	G	6–2	170	Sophomore	Saline, Michigan
L.J. Frazier	12	G	5–10	160	Junior	Ypsilanti, Michigan
Antonio Green	13	G	6–3	190	Junior	Inkster, Michigan
Jamell Harris	32	F	6–9	215	Sophomore	Euclid, Ohio
Jay Higgins	1	F	6–6	195	Senior	Fayetteville, North Carolina
Kamil Janton	51	C	6–10	230	Junior	Tarnów, Poland
Darrell Lampley	34	G	5–10	170	Junior	Linden, New Jersey
J.R. Sims	2	G	6–3	180	Sophomore	Fort Wayne, Indiana
Kenny Stewart	22	F	6–8	205	Sophomore	Williamsport, Pennsylvania
Derek Thompson	30	G	6–3	180	Sophomore	Detroit, Michigan

== Coaching staff ==
Name	Position	College	Graduating year
Charles Ramsey	Head coach	Eastern Michigan University	1992
Derrick McDowell	Associate Coach	Stetson University	1983
Carl Thomas	Assistant Coach	Eastern Michigan University	2000
Andrew Moore	Assistant Coach	Muskingum University	1992
Chris Highfield	Director of Basketball Operations	Michigan University	2000
Lauren Flaum	Graduate Assistant	Eastern Michigan University	2009

== Schedule ==
Date time, TV	Rank^{#}	Opponent^{#}	Result	Record	Site (attendance) city, state
November 6*; 2:00 p.m.		Marycrove; EXHIBITION	W 101-56		Convocation Center; Ypsilanti, Michigan
November 12*; 8:30 p.m., Big Ten Network		at No. 2 Michigan State	L 66-96	0–1	Breslin Center (14,797); East Lansing, Michigan
November 17*; 12:00 p.m.		Madonna; Education Day	W 79-70	1–1	Convocation Center (2836); Ypsilanti, Michigan
November 20*; 2:00 pm		at Canisius	L 51-71	1–2	Koessler Athletic Center (1314); Buffalo, New York
November 27*; 7:00 pm		at James Madison	L 68-74	1–3	Convocation Center (68-74); Harrisonburg, Virginia
December 3*; 5:30 p.m.		vs. Monmouth; BTI Classic Tournament	L 63-64	1–4	Memorial Gymnasium; Moscow, Idaho
December 4*; 5:30 p.m.		vs. North Dakota; BTI Classic Tournament	L 49-54	1–5	Memorial Gymnasium (986); Moscow, Idaho
December 5*; 6:00 p.m.		at Idaho; BTI Classic Tournament	L 60-75	1–6	Memorial Gymnasium (417); Moscow, Idaho
December 8*; 8:00 p.m.		Drake	L 54-58	1–7	Convocation Center (693); Ypsilanti, Michigan
December 11*; 2:00 pm		Detroit	L 65-68 ^{1OT}	1–8	Convocation Center (1048); Ypsilanti, Michigan
December 20*; 5:00 pm		vs. Valparaiso; Lou Henson Award Tournament	L 67-704	1-9	Athletics Center O'rena (507); Rochester, Michigan
December 21*; 5:00 pm		at Rochester College; Lou Henson Award Tournament	W 82-63	2-9	Athletics Center O'rena (470); Rochester, Michigan
December 31*; 2:00 p.m.		at Samford	L 51-55	2-10	Pete Hanna Center (651); Birmingham, Alabama
January 4*; 7:00 pm		Ferris State University	W 76-60	3-10	Convocation Center (485); Ypsilanti, Michigan
January 8; 7:00 pm		at Toledo	W 71-48	4-10 (1-0)	Savage Arena (4486); Toledo, Ohio
January 11; 7:00 pm		Northern Illinois	L 69-71	4-11 (1-1)	Convocation Center (490); Ypsilanti, Michigan
January 16; 2:00 pm		at Western Michigan	L 48-65	4-12 (1-2)	University Arena (2747); Kalamazoo, Michigan
January 19; 7:00 pm		Ball State	L 51-60	4-13 (1-3)	Convocation Center (741); Ypsilanti, Michigan
January 23; 2:00 pm		Central Michigan	W 41-38	5-13 (2-3)	Convocation Center (1076); Ypsilanti, Michigan
January 26; 7:00 pm		at Ohio	L 65-79	5-14 (2-4)	Convocation Center (3949); Athens, Ohio
January 29		at Bowling Green	L 63-68	5-15 (2-5)	Anderson Arena (1886); Bowling Green, Ohio
February 2; 7:00 pm		Akron	W 60-56	6-15 (3-5)	Convocation Center (424); Ypsilanti, Michigan
February 5; 4:30 p.m.		Miami (OH)	L 56-58	6-16 (3-6)	Convocation Center (1178); Ypsilanti, Michigan
February 9; 7:00 pm		at Kent State	L 70-80	6-17 (3-7)	Memorial Athletic and Convocation Center (2756); Kent, Ohio
February 12; 4:30 p.m.		Buffalo	W 78-65	7-17 (4-7)	Convocation Center (1220); Ypsilanti, Michigan
February 16; 7:30 pm		at Central Michigan	L 60-66	7-18 (4-8)	McGuirk Arena (2093); Mount Pleasant, Michigan
February 19*; 4:30 p.m.		Jacksonville State; ESPN BracketBusters	W 63-60	8-18 (4-8)	Convocation Center; Ypsilanti, Michigan
February 23; 7:00 pm		at Ball State	L 49-64	8-19 (4-9)	John E. Worthen Arena (3082); Muncie, Indiana
February 27; 2:00 pm		Western Michigan; Earl Boykin’s Jersey Retirement Night	L 60-87	8-20 (4-10)	Convocation Center (1570); Ypsilanti, Michigan
March 2; 7:00 pm		at Northern Illinois	L 49-66	8-21 (4-11)	Convocation Center (1231); DeKalb, Illinois
March 5; 2:00 pm		Toledo; Senior Night	W 69-50	9-21 (5-11)	Convocation Center (538); Ypsilanti, Michigan
March 2; 7:00 pm		at Northern Illinois	L 49-66	8-21 (4-11)	Convocation Center (1231); DeKalb, Illinois
March 8; 7:00 pm		at No. 6 Akron; MAC Tournament	L 53-67	9-22 (4-11)	James A. Rhodes Arena (1431); Akron, Ohio
*Non-Conference Game. ^{#}Rankings from AP Poll. All times are in Eastern Time Zone.

== Awards ==
Second Team All-MAC

- Brandon Bowdry
