= 2010–11 Ohio Bobcats men's basketball team =

American college basketball season

2010–11 Ohio Bobcats men's basketball

2011 CIT, Quarterfinals
- Conference: Mid-American Conference
- East Division
- Record: 19–16 (9–7 MAC)
- Head coach: John Groce (3rd season)
- Assistant coaches: Jamall Walker; Ramon Williams; Dustin Ford
- Home arena: Convocation Center

2010–11 Mid-American Conference men's basketball standings
	Conf.				Overall
Team	W		L	PCT	W		L	PCT
East
Kent State	12	–	4	.750	25	–	12	.676
Miami (OH)	11	–	5	.688	16	–	17	.485
Ohio	9	–	7	.563	19	–	16	.543
Akron †	9	–	7	.563	23	–	13	.639
Bowling Green	8	–	8	.500	14	–	19	.424
Buffalo	8	–	8	.500	20	–	14	.588
West
Western Michigan	11	–	5	.688	21	–	13	.618
Ball State	10	–	6	.625	19	–	13	.594
Central Michigan	7	–	9	.438	10	–	21	.323
Northern Illinois	5	–	11	.313	9	–	21	.300
Eastern Michigan	5	–	11	.313	9	–	22	.290
Toledo	1	–	15	.063	4	–	28	.125
† Conference tournament winner Rankings from AP Poll

The 2010–11 Ohio Bobcats men's basketball team represented Ohio University in the college basketball season of 2010–11. The team was coached by John Groce and played their home games at the Convocation Center. They finished the season 19–16 and 9–7 in MAC play to finish tied for third in the MAC East.

== Before the season ==
=== Recruiting ===
College recruiting information
Name	Hometown	School	Height	Weight	Commit date
Ricardo Johnson; SG	Covington, KY	Holmes HS	6 ft 4 in (1.93 m)	190 lb (86 kg)	Sep 10, 2009
Ricardo Johnson; SG	Recruit ratings: Scout: (90)				
Ethan Jacobs; C	Tipton, IN	Tipton HS	6 ft 10 in (2.08 m)	220 lb (100 kg)	May 31, 2009
Ethan Jacobs; C	Recruit ratings: Scout: (86)				
Nick Kellogg; PG	Westerville, OH	St. Francis DeSales HS	6 ft 3 in (1.91 m)	185 lb (84 kg)	Nov 19, 2009
Nick Kellogg; PG	Recruit ratings: Rivals: (86)				
T.J. Hall; SF	Gainesville, FL	Gainesville HS	6 ft 6 in (1.98 m)	210 lb (95 kg)	Sep 23, 2009
T.J. Hall; SF	Recruit ratings: Scout: (85)				
Overall recruit ranking:
Note: In many cases, Scout, Rivals, 247Sports, On3, and ESPN may conflict in their listings of height and weight.; In these cases, the average was taken. ESPN grades are on a 100-point scale.; Sources: "Ohio Commit List for 2010". Rivals.; "Scout.com: Men's Basketball Recruiting". Scout.; "Ohio Basketball Recruiting 2010". ESPN.; "Scout.com Team Recruiting Rankings". Scout.; "2010 Team Ranking". Rivals.

== Roster ==
2010–11 Ohio Bobcats men's basketball team
Players
Coaches

Pos.	#	Name	Height	Weight	Year	Hometown
F	11	Adetunji Adedipe (C)	6 ft 5 in (1.96 m)	215 lb (98 kg)	Sr	Orange, Ohio
F	3	Ivo Baltic	6 ft 8 in (2.03 m)	214 lb (97 kg)	So	Kansas City, Missouri
G	5	D. J. Cooper	5 ft 11 in (1.8 m)	165 lb (75 kg)	So	Chicago, Illinois
F	24	Tommy Freeman (C)	6 ft 5 in (1.96 m)	190 lb (86 kg)	Sr	Muncie, Indiana
G	2	Nick Goff	6 ft 4 in (1.93 m)	180 lb (82 kg)	So	Columbus, Ohio
F	13	T. J. Hall	6 ft 6 in (1.98 m)	210 lb (95 kg)	Fr	Gainesville, Florida
C	53	Ethan Jacobs	6 ft 10 in (2.08 m)	220 lb (100 kg)	Fr	Tipton, Indiana
G	20	Ricardo Johnson	6 ft 4 in (1.93 m)	190 lb (86 kg)	Fr	Covington, Kentucky
F	30	Reggie Keely	6 ft 8 in (2.03 m)	263 lb (119 kg)	So	University Heights, Ohio
G	15	Nick Kellogg	6 ft 3 in (1.91 m)	185 lb (84 kg)	Fr	Westerville, Ohio
G	4	David McKinley	5 ft 9 in (1.75 m)	156 lb (71 kg)	So	Dublin, Ohio
G	34	Walter Offutt (I)	6 ft 3 in (1.91 m)	190 lb (86 kg)	Jr	Indianapolis, Indiana
F	44	Asown Sayles (C)	6 ft 6 in (1.98 m)	228 lb (103 kg)	RS Sr	McKeesport, Pennsylvania
F	21	Jon Smith (I)	6 ft 7 in (2.01 m)	190 lb (86 kg)	So	Grove City, Ohio
F	1	DeVaughn Washington	6 ft 8 in (2.03 m)	225 lb (102 kg)	Sr	Virginia Beach, Virginia

Head coach

John Groce

Assistant coach(es)

Jamall Walker
Ramon Williams
Dustin Ford

Legend

- (C) Team captain
- (S) Suspended
- (I) Ineligible
- (W) Walk-on
- Injured
- Current redshirt

Roster
Last update: 2011-01-22

== Preseason ==
The preseason poll and league awards were announced by the league office on October 28, 2010. Ohio was picked first in the MAC East

=== Preseason men's basketball poll ===
(First place votes in parentheses)

==== East Division ====
1. Ohio 128 (12)
2. Kent State 114 (8)
3. Akron 104 (4)
4. Miami 84
5. Bowling Green 42
6. Buffalo 32

==== West Division ====
1. Ball State 124 (12)
2. Central Michigan 122 (8)
3. Eastern Michigan 88 (2)
4. Western Michigan 68
5. Northern Illinois 64 (2)
6. Toledo 38 points

==== Tournament champs ====
Ohio (10), Kent State (6), Central Michigan (4), Ball State (2), Akron (2)

=== Preseason All-MAC ===
Preseason All-MAC teams
Team	Player	Position	Year
Preseason All-MAC East	DJ Cooper	G	So.

== Coaching staff ==
Name	Position	College	Graduating year
John Groce	Head coach	Taylor University	1994
Jamall Walker	Assistant Coach	Saint Louis University	2000
Dustin Ford	Assistant Coach	Ohio University	2001
Ramon Williams	Assistant Coach	Virginia Military Institute	1990
Aaron Fuss	Director of Operations	Ohio State University	2005

== Schedule ==
Date time, TV	Rank^{#}	Opponent^{#}	Result	Record	Site (attendance) city, state
Exhibition
October 31*; 2:00 pm		Wooster	W 86–50; Stats		Convocation Center (2,581); Athens, Ohio
November 6*; 2:00 pm		Walsh; Exhibition	W 78–64; Stats		Convocation Center (2,019); Athens, Ohio
Regular season
November 13*; 2:00 pm		Delaware	W 88–69; Stats	1–0	Convocation Center (5,681); Athens, Ohio
November 15*; 7:00 pm		Oakland	L 66–78; Stats	1–1	Convocation Center (5,084); Athens, Ohio
November 21*; 2:00 pm		Texas A&M–Corpus Christi	W 83–70; Stats	2–1	Convocation Center (4,142); Athens, Ohio
November 23*; 7:00 pm		Valparaiso	W 78–75; Stats	3–1	Convocation Center (4,086); Athens, Ohio
November 26*; 8:00 pm		vs. No. 6 Kansas; Las Vegas Invitational	L 41–98; Stats	3–2	Orleans Arena (4,050); Paradise, Nevada
November 27*; 7:30 pm		vs. Santa Clara; Las Vegas Invitational	W 78–72; Stats	4–2	Orleans Arena (4,010); Paradise, Nevada
December 4*; 2:00 pm		Marshall	L 57–65; Stats	4–3	Convocation Center (5,977); Athens, Ohio
December 8*; 7:00 pm		Illinois State	W 67–65; Stats	5–3	Redbird Arena (4,027); Normal, Illinois
December 12*; 2:00 pm		IUPUI	L 56–66; Stats	5–4	Convocation Center (3,504); Athens, Ohio
December 15*; 7:00 pm		Saint Francis (PA)	W 87–58; Stats	6–4	Convocation Center (3,426); Athens, Ohio
December 18*; 2:00 pm		at St. Bonaventure	L 107–112; Stats ^{4OT}	6–5	Reilly Center (3,053); St. Bonaventure, New York
December 22*; 7:00 pm		Temple	L 65–76; Stats	6–6	Convocation Center (6,942); Athens, Ohio
December 30*; 7:00 pm		Norfolk State	W 92–56; Stats	7–6	Convocation Center (3,901); Athens, Ohio
January 2*; 2:00 pm		Robert Morris	L 76–79; Stats ^{OT}	7–7	Convocation Center (3,338); Athens, Ohio
MAC regular season
January 9; 2:00 pm, STO; ESPN3		Miami (OH)	L 88–92; Stats ^{3OT}	7–8 (0–1)	Convocation Center (9,749); Athens, Ohio
January 12; 7:00 pm		at Akron	W 79–70; Stats	8–8 (1–1)	James A. Rhodes Arena (2,865); Akron, Ohio
January 15; 7:00 pm		Kent State	L 66–69; Stats	8–9 (1–2)	Convocation Center (8,022); Athens, Ohio
January 19; 7:00 pm		at Bowling Green	L 61–73; Stats	8–10 (1–3)	Anderson Arena (1,655); Bowling Green, Ohio
January 22; 3:00 pm, ESPNU		Buffalo	L 68–73; Stats	8–11 (1–4)	Convocation Center (10,427); Athens, Ohio
January 26; 7:00 pm		Eastern Michigan	W 79–65; Stats	9–11 (2–4)	Convocation Center (3,949); Athens, Ohio
January 29; 2:00 pm		at Ball State	W 61–60; Stats	10–11 (3–4)	John E. Worthen Arena (3,976); Muncie, Indiana
February 2; 7:30 pm, STO		at Central Michigan	L 85–91; Stats	10–12 (3–5)	McGuirk Arena (1,239); Mount Pleasant, Michigan
February 5; 3:00 pm		Northern Illinois	W 80–73; Stats	11–12 (4–5)	Convocation Center (6,879); Athens, Ohio
February 9; 7:00 pm		Toledo	W 71–58; Stats	12–12 (5–5)	Convocation Center (4,183); Athens, Ohio
February 12; 4:00 pm		at Western Michigan	L 83–85; Stats	12–13 (5–6)	University Arena (3,565); Kalamazoo, Michigan
February 15; 7:30 pm, STO		at Buffalo	W 76–69; Stats	13–13 (6–6)	Alumni Arena (1,962); Buffalo, New York
February 19*; 7:00 pm		at Winthrop; ESPN BracketBusters	W 77–74; Stats ^{OT}	14–13	Winthrop Coliseum (1,543); Rock Hill, South Carolina
February 23; 7:30 pm, STO		Bowling Green	W 70–60; Stats	15–13 (7–6)	Convocation Center (4,932); Athens, Ohio
February 26; 7:00 pm		at Kent State	W 88–87; Stats ^{OT}	16–13 (8–6)	Memorial Athletic and Convocation Center (5,125); Kent, Ohio
March 1; 7:00 pm		Akron	W 80–55; Stats	17–13 (9–6)	Convocation Center (8,630); Athens, Ohio
March 4; 7:00 pm		at Miami (OH)	L 66–76; Stats	17–14 (9–7)	Millett Hall (2,526); Oxford, Ohio
MAC tournament
March 8; 7:00 pm	(5)	(12) Toledo; MAC First Round	W 74–57; Stats	18–14	Convocation Center (3,521); Athens, Ohio
March 10; 9:30 pm, STO	(5)	vs. (4) Ball State; MAC Quarterfinals	L 73–76; Stats ^{OT}	18–15	Quicken Loans Arena (3,615); Cleveland, Ohio
CIT
March 15*; 7:00 pm		at Marshall; CIT First Round	W 65–64; Stats	19–15	Cam Henderson Center (4,205); Huntington, West Virginia
March 22*; 7:00 pm		at East Tennessee State; CIT Quarterfinals	L 73–82; Stats	19–16	ETSU/MSHA Athletic Center (2,203); Johnson City, Tennessee
*Non-conference game. ^{#}Rankings from AP Poll. (#) Tournament seedings in parentheses. All times are in Eastern Time.

== Statistics ==
=== Team statistics ===
Final 2010–11 statistics

Record	Ohio	OPP
Scoring	2604	2548
Scoring Average	74.40	72.80
Field goals – Att	896–2060	882–1971
3-pt. Field goals – Att	260–734	233–657
Free throws – Att	552–769	551–789
Rebounds	1265	1253
Assists	533	480
Turnovers	471	535
Steals	277	206
Blocked Shots	88	130

=== Player statistics ===
			Minutes		Scoring		Total FGs			3-point FGs			Free-Throws			Rebounds								
Player	GP	GS	Tot	Avg	Pts	Avg	FG	FGA	Pct	3FG	3FA	Pct	FT	FTA	Pct	Off	Def	Tot	Avg	A	PF	TO	Stl	Blk
D.J. Cooper	35	32	1248	35.7	552	15.8	180	471	0.382	58	194	0.299	134	179	0.749	43	133	176	5	263	74	123	81	9
DeVaughn Washington	34	26	1004	29.5	454	13.4	167	320	0.522	1	1	1	119	188	0.633	59	133	192	5.6	32	102	62	36	13
Ivo Baltic	35	32	900	25.7	398	11.4	152	284	0.535	0	2	0	94	120	0.783	75	138	213	6.1	38	104	62	26	7
Tommy Freeman	34	26	1007	29.6	385	11.3	113	273	0.414	99	227	0.436	60	71	0.845	8	64	72	2.1	39	83	29	34	2
Nick Kellogg	35	28	903	25.8	272	7.8	85	204	0.417	64	147	0.435	38	50	0.76	10	39	49	1.4	69	78	38	27	1
Reggie Keely	35	9	641	18.3	185	5.3	72	159	0.453	0	0	0	41	58	0.707	67	95	162	4.6	25	87	50	18	38
T.J. Hall	35	10	584	16.7	157	4.5	55	154	0.357	26	95	0.274	21	27	0.778	30	51	81	2.3	34	84	43	19	6
Ricardo Johnson	34	2	372	10.9	93	2.7	31	94	0.33	3	23	0.13	28	45	0.622	29	38	67	2	14	50	29	16	5
Asown Sayles	34	9	451	13.3	70	2.1	27	70	0.386	7	37	0.189	9	15	0.6	22	63	85	2.5	15	36	15	16	6
Adetunji Adedipe	23	0	92	4	22	1	10	15	0.667	0	0	0	2	6	0.333	12	13	25	1.1	1	21	8	2	1
Ethan Jacobs	9	0	24	2.7	8	0.9	2	7	0.286	0	1	0	4	8	0.5	3	2	5	0.6	0	2	5	1	0
David McKinley	12	1	49	4.1	8	0.7	2	9	0.222	2	7	0.286	2	2	1	1	2	3	0.3	3	3	2	1	0
Total	35	-	7275	-	2604	74.4	896	2060	0.435	260	734	0.354	552	769	0.718	432	833	1265	36.1	533	726	471	277	88
Opponents	35	-	7275	-	2548	72.8	882	1971	0.447	233	657	0.355	551	789	0.698	398	855	1253	35.8	480	693	535	206	130

Legend
GP	Games played	GS	Games started	Avg	Average per game
FG	Field-goals made	FGA	Field-goal attempts	Off	Offensive rebounds
Def	Defensive rebounds	A	Assists	TO	Turnovers
Blk	Blocks	Stl	Steals	High	Team high

== Awards and honors ==
=== All-MAC Awards ===
Postseason All-MAC teams
Team	Player	Position	Year
All-MAC First Team	DJ Cooper	G	So.
All-MAC Honorable Mention	DeVaughn Washington	F	Sr.
All-MAC Freshman Team	Nick Kellogg	G	Fr.
