= Porrini =

Porrini is an Italian surname. Notable people with the surname include:

- Dino Porrini (born 1953), Italian cyclist
- Michael Porrini (born 1989), American basketball player and coach
- Sergio Porrini (born 1968), Italian footballer and manager

== See also ==
- Porrino (surname)
