= 2010–11 Buffalo Bulls men's basketball team =

American college basketball season

2010–11 Buffalo Bulls men's basketball

CIT, Quarterfinals
- Conference: Mid-American Conference
- East
- Record: 20–14 (8–8 MAC)
- Head coach: Reggie Witherspoon (12th season)
- Assistant coaches: Jim Kwitchoff (12th season); Kevin Heck (6th season); Turner Battle (4th season)
- Home arena: Alumni Arena

2010–11 Mid-American Conference men's basketball standings
	Conf.				Overall
Team	W		L	PCT	W		L	PCT
East
Kent State	12	–	4	.750	25	–	12	.676
Miami (OH)	11	–	5	.688	16	–	17	.485
Ohio	9	–	7	.563	19	–	16	.543
Akron †	9	–	7	.563	23	–	13	.639
Bowling Green	8	–	8	.500	14	–	19	.424
Buffalo	8	–	8	.500	20	–	14	.588
West
Western Michigan	11	–	5	.688	21	–	13	.618
Ball State	10	–	6	.625	19	–	13	.594
Central Michigan	7	–	9	.438	10	–	21	.323
Northern Illinois	5	–	11	.313	9	–	21	.300
Eastern Michigan	5	–	11	.313	9	–	22	.290
Toledo	1	–	15	.063	4	–	28	.125
† Conference tournament winner Rankings from AP Poll

The 2010–11 Buffalo Bulls men's basketball team represented the University at Buffalo during the 2010–11 NCAA Division I men's basketball season. The Bulls, led by twelfth-year head coach Reggie Witherspoon, played their home games at Alumni Arena in Amherst, New York as members of the Mid-American Conference (MAC). They finished the season 20–14, 8–8 in MAC play to finish in sixth place in the MAC East. It was the third 20-win season in the school's NCAA Division I history and the second in their past three seasons.

Buffalo hosted unanimous national college player of the year Jimmer Fredette and the 16th-ranked BYU Cougars at Alumni Arena on December 30, 2010. The Bulls held Fredette to 6 points on 1-of-9 shooting in the first half but Fredette managed 28 points in the second half for a season-high total of 34; BYU ultimately won 90–82. After the game, Reggie Witherspoon said that Fredette was indisputably the best college basketball player ever to play a game in Western New York.

Despite an exit in the quarterfinals of the MAC men's basketball tournament, Buffalo received an invitation to the CollegeInsider.com Postseason Tournament (CIT). It was the school's third Division I postseason appearance and first since the 2009 College Basketball Invitational. In the CIT, Buffalo won its first two games before losing in the quarterfinals against eventual runner-up Iona.

The 2010–11 season featured the college debut of Javon McCrea. At the end of the season, McCrea would be the first Buffalo player named the MAC Freshman of the Year. McCrea would go on to become the program's all-time leading scorer.

Four-year captain Byron Mulkey, a senior from Niagara-Wheatfield High School, set a program record with 85 steals in the final season of his college basketball career.

== Previous season ==
The previous year's Bulls finished the 2009–10 season with an overall record of 18–12 and a record of 9–7 in conference play. It was just their second consecutive season with a winning record. In spite of that, they lost in the second round of the 2010 MAC tournament. Buffalo graduated its top five scorers from this team. Senior guard Byron Mulkey redshirted in 2009–10 due to the logjam of seniors at the guard position and the need for senior leadership on the 2010–11 team.

=== Departures ===
Name	Number	Pos.	Height	Weight	Year	Hometown	Notes
Sean Smiley	3	G	6 ft 1 in (1.85 m)	170 lb (77 kg)	Senior	Erie, PA	Graduated
Rodney Pierce	4	G	6 ft 2 in (1.88 m)	200 lb (91 kg)	Senior	Niagara Falls, NY	Graduated
Derek Wolfley	15	F	6 ft 7 in (2.01 m)	230 lb (100 kg)	Freshman	Attica, NY	—
John Boyer	22	G	6 ft 1 in (1.85 m)	185 lb (84 kg)	Senior	Hollidaysburg, PA	Graduated
Calvin Betts	25	G	6 ft 4 in (1.93 m)	230 lb (100 kg)	Senior	Rochester, NY	Graduated
Adekambi Laleye	33	F	6 ft 9 in (2.06 m)	225 lb (102 kg)	Senior	Ottawa, ON	Graduated
Max Boudreau	40	F	6 ft 8 in (2.03 m)	240 lb (110 kg)	Senior	Montreal, QC	Graduated

== Roster ==
2010–11 Buffalo Bulls men's basketball team
Players
Coaches

Pos.	#	Name	Height	Weight	Year	Previous school	Hometown
G	1	Tony Watson II	6 ft 2 in (1.88 m)	180 lb (82 kg)	So	Palm Beach Gardens High School	West Palm Beach, FL
G	2	Byron Mulkey (C)	6 ft 0 in (1.83 m)	175 lb (79 kg)	RS Sr	Niagara-Wheatfield High School	Wheatfield, NY
G	3	Jarod Oldham	6 ft 3 in (1.91 m)	185 lb (84 kg)	Fr	Eisenhower High School	Decatur, IL
G	4	Richie Sebuharara (W)	6 ft 0 in (1.83 m)	160 lb (73 kg)	So	Vestal High School	Vestal, NY
G	5	Zach Filzen	6 ft 3 in (1.91 m)	185 lb (84 kg)	Jr	Northern Arizona	Northfield, MN
G	10	Corey Raley-Ross	6 ft 3 in (1.91 m)	195 lb (88 kg)	Fr	Harding University High School	Charlotte, NC
F	12	Javon McCrea	6 ft 6 in (1.98 m)	250 lb (113 kg)	Fr	Newark High School	Newark, NY
F	21	Mitchell Watt	6 ft 10 in (2.08 m)	225 lb (102 kg)	Jr	Desert Edge High School	Goodyear, AZ
G	22	Auraum Nuiriankh	6 ft 5 in (1.96 m)	200 lb (91 kg)	Fr	Charis Prep High School	Baltimore, MD
G	24	Dave Barnett	6 ft 5 in (1.96 m)	215 lb (98 kg)	Jr	East Aurora High School	East Aurora, NY
F	30	Titus Robinson	6 ft 7 in (2.01 m)	210 lb (95 kg)	Jr	East Mecklenburg High School	Charlotte, NC
F	32	Jawaan Alston	6 ft 8 in (2.03 m)	225 lb (102 kg)	Sr	Albert Gallatin High School	Uniontown, PA
C	33	Cameron Downing	6 ft 9 in (2.06 m)	260 lb (118 kg)	Fr	Memorial High School	Tulsa, OK
F	44	Mike Clifford	6 ft 7 in (2.01 m)	245 lb (111 kg)	So	Bishop Fenwick High School	Danvers, MA

Head coach

- Reggie Witherspoon (Wheeling)

Assistant coach(es)

- Jim Kwitchoff (Boston College)
- Kevin Heck (Wayne State (MI))
- Turner Battle (Buffalo)

Legend

- (C) Team captain
- (S) Suspended
- (I) Ineligible
- (W) Walk-on
- Injured
- Current redshirt

Roster

== Schedule ==
Date time, TV	Rank^{#}	Opponent^{#}	Result	Record	Site city, state
Regular season
November 13, 2010*		Navy	W 88–46	1–0	Alumni Arena; Amherst, NY
November 16, 2010*		at Youngstown State	L 53–64	1–1	Beeghly Center; Youngstown, OH
November 20, 2010*		Towson	W 87–76	2–1	Alumni Arena; Amherst, NY
November 23, 2010*		at Canisius	W 81–64	3–1	Koessler Athletic Center; Buffalo, New York
November 27, 2010*		at Indiana State	L 54–58	3–2	Hulman Center; Terre Haute, IN
December 1, 2010*		at Army	W 56–54	4–2	Christl Arena; West Point, NY
December 4, 2010*		at St. Bonaventure	L 74–76	4–3	Reilly Center; St. Bonaventure, NY
December 8, 2010*		Niagara	W 82–64	5–3	Alumni Arena; Amherst, NY
December 11, 2010*		Green Bay	W 78–64	6–3	Alumni Arena; Amherst, NY
December 18, 2010*		Houghton	W 79–47	7–3	Alumni Arena; Amherst, NY
December 30, 2010*		No. 16 BYU	L 82–90	7–4	Alumni Arena; Amherst, NY
January 3, 2011*		at Cornell	W 78–66	8–4	Newman Arena; Ithaca, NY
January 8, 2011		Bowling Green	L 71–74 ^{2OT}	8–5 (0–1)	Alumni Arena; Amherst, NY
January 13, 2011		at Miami (OH)	L 67–70	8–6 (0–2)	Millett Hall; Oxford, OH
January 16, 2011		Akron	W 73–70	9–6 (1–2)	Alumni Arena; Amherst, NY
January 19, 2011		Kent State	W 79–54	10–6 (2–2)	Alumni Arena; Amherst, NY
January 22, 2011		at Ohio	W 73–68	11–6 (3–2)	Convocation Center; Athens, OH
January 25, 2011		at Western Michigan	W 79–68	12–6 (4–2)	University Arena; Kalamazoo, MI
January 29, 2011		Northern Illinois	W 63–52	13–6 (5–2)	Alumni Arena; Amherst, NY
February 3, 2011		Toledo	W 81–58	14–6 (6–2)	Alumni Arena; Amherst, NY
February 5, 2011		at Ball State	L 71–72	14–7 (6–3)	Worthen Arena; Muncie, IN
February 8, 2011		Central Michigan	W 72–43	15–7 (7–3)	Alumni Arena; Amherst, NY
February 12, 2011		at Eastern Michigan	L 65–78	15–8 (7–4)	Convocation Center; Ypsilanti, MI
February 15, 2011		Ohio	L 69–76	15–9 (7–5)	Alumni Arena; Amherst, NY
February 19, 2011*		Milwaukee; ESPN BracketBusters	W 80–65	16–9	Alumni Arena; Amherst, NY
February 24, 2011		at Kent State	L 69–72	16–10 (7–6)	MAC Center; Kent, OH
February 26, 2011		at Akron	L 60–69	16–11 (7–7)	James A. Rhodes Arena; Akron, OH
March 2, 2011		Miami (OH)	W 59–49	17–11 (8–7)	Alumni Arena; Amherst, NY
March 5, 2011		at Bowling Green	L 63–73	17–12 (8–8)	Anderson Arena; Bowling Green, OH
2011 MAC Men's Basketball Tournament
March 8, 2011	(8)	(9) Central Michigan; First Round	W 64–50	18–12	Alumni Arena; Amherst, NY
March 10, 2011	(8)	vs. (1) Kent State; Quarterfinal	L 62–73	18–13	Quicken Loans Arena; Cleveland, OH
2011 CollegeInsider.com Postseason Tournament
March 14, 2011		at Quinnipiac; First Round	W 75–68	19–13	TD Bank Sports Center; Hamden, CT
March 19, 2011		at Western Michigan; Second Round	W 49–48	20–13	University Arena; Kalamazoo, MI
March 22, 2011		at Iona; Quarterfinal	L 63–78	20–14	Hynes Athletic Center; New Rochelle, NY
*Non-conference game. ^{#}Rankings from AP Poll. (#) Tournament seedings in parentheses.

== Awards ==
=== Freshman of the Year ===
- Javon McCrea – 2011

=== Academic All-MAC ===
- Byron Mulkey – 2011

=== All-MAC Second Team ===
- Byron Mulkey – 2011

=== MAC All-Freshman Team ===
- Javon McCrea – 2011
