= 2010–11 Akron Zips men's basketball team =

American college basketball season

2010–11 Akron Zips men's basketball
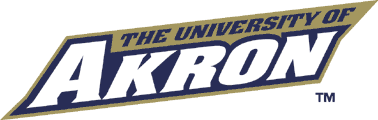

MAC tournament champions

NCAA tournament, Round of 64
- Conference: Mid-American Conference
- East Division
- Record: 23–13 (9–7 MAC)
- Head coach: Keith Dambrot (7th season)
- Assistant coaches: Rick McFadden; Charles Thomas; Terry Weigand
- Home arena: James A. Rhodes Arena

2010–11 Mid-American Conference men's basketball standings
	Conf.				Overall
Team	W		L	PCT	W		L	PCT
East
Kent State	12	–	4	.750	25	–	12	.676
Miami (OH)	11	–	5	.688	16	–	17	.485
Ohio	9	–	7	.563	19	–	16	.543
Akron †	9	–	7	.563	23	–	13	.639
Bowling Green	8	–	8	.500	14	–	19	.424
Buffalo	8	–	8	.500	20	–	14	.588
West
Western Michigan	11	–	5	.688	21	–	13	.618
Ball State	10	–	6	.625	19	–	13	.594
Central Michigan	7	–	9	.438	10	–	21	.323
Northern Illinois	5	–	11	.313	9	–	21	.300
Eastern Michigan	5	–	11	.313	9	–	22	.290
Toledo	1	–	15	.063	4	–	28	.125
† Conference tournament winner Rankings from AP Poll

The 2010–11 Akron Zips men's basketball team represented the University of Akron during the 2010–11 NCAA Division I men's basketball season. The Zips, led by seventh year head coach Keith Dambrot, played their home games at the James A. Rhodes Arena as members of the East Division of the Mid-American Conference(MAC). They finished the season 23–13, 9–7 in MAC play to finish in fourth place in the East Division. They won the MAC tournament after defeating Kent State in overtime in the championship game. They received an automatic bid to the NCAA tournament as a fifteen seed in the southeast regional where they lost in the first round to the #2 seeded Notre Dame.

== Schedule ==
Date time, TV	Rank^{#}	Opponent^{#}	Result	Record	Site (attendance) city, state
Exhibition
November 4, 2010*; 7:00 pm		John Carroll	W 111–48	—	Rhodes Arena; Akron, OH
Regular season
November 12, 2010*; 7:30 pm		Millikin	W 89–41	1–0	Rhodes Arena (2,932); Akron, OH
November 16, 2010*; 9:00 pm		at Dayton	L 68–76	1–1	UD Arena (12,377); Dayton, OH
November 20, 2010*; 7:00 pm		Youngstown State	W 91–84 ^{OT}	2–1	Rhodes Arena (2,527); Akron, OH
November 24, 2010*; 7:00 pm		Cleveland State	L 51–64	2–2	Rhodes Arena (2,716); Akron, OH
December 1, 2010*; 7:00 pm		at Detroit	W 77–69	3–2	Calihan Hall (1,631); Detroit, MI
December 4, 2010*; 4:00 pm		at UIC	W 54–52	4–2	UIC Pavilion (3,614); Chicago, IL
December 12, 2010*; 3:00 pm		at Temple	L 47–82	4–3	Liacouras Center (3,834); Philadelphia, PA
December 15, 2010*; 8:30 pm		at No. 21 Minnesota	L 58–66	4–4	Williams Arena (11,237); Minneapolis, MN
December 18, 2010*; 2:00 pm		Bethune–Cookman	W 77–66 ^{OT}	5–4	Rhodes Arena (1,900); Akron, OH
December 21, 2010*; 7:30 pm		vs. Arkansas–Little Rock; Las Vegas Holiday Classic	W 75–61	6–4	South Point Arena (1,180); Enterprise, NV
December 22, 2010*; 5:15 pm		vs. Stetson; Las Vegas Holiday Classic	W 72–56	7–4	South Point Arena (1,095); Enterprise, NV
December 23, 2010*; 3:00 pm		vs. Miami (FL); Las Vegas Holiday Classic	L 61–69	7–5	South Point Arena (974); Enterprise, NV
December 29, 2010*; 7:00 pm		Arkansas–Pine Bluff	W 87–60	8–5	Rhodes Arena (2,138); Akron, OH
January 3, 2011*; 7:00 pm		Oral Roberts	W 84–80	9–5	Rhodes Arena (1,920); Akron, OH
January 8, 2011; 7:00 pm		Kent State	W 65–62	10–5 (1–0)	Rhodes Arena (5,019); Akron, OH
January 12, 2011; 7:00 pm		Ohio	L 70–79	10–6 (1–1)	Rhodes Arena (2,865); Akron, OH
January 16, 2011; 2:00 pm		at Buffalo	L 70–73	10–7 (1–2)	Alumni Arena (1,679); Buffalo, NY
January 19, 2011; 7:00 pm		at Miami (OH)	L 76–84	10–8 (1–3)	Millett Hall (1,741); Oxford, OH
January 22, 2011; 7:30 pm		Bowling Green	W 63–58	11–8 (2–3)	Rhodes Arena (3,616); Akron, OH
January 26, 2011; 7:30 pm		at Northern Illinois	L 74–83	11–9 (2–4)	Convocation Center (771); DeKalb, IL
January 30, 2011; 6:00 pm		Central Michigan	W 63–43	12–9 (3–4)	Rhodes Arena (2,590); Akron, OH
February 2, 2011; 7:00 pm		at Eastern Michigan	L 56–60	12–10 (3–5)	Convocation Center (424); Ypsilanti, MI
February 5, 2011; 7:00 pm		at Toledo	W 59–41	13–10 (4–5)	Savage Arena (4,467); Toledo, OH
February 9, 2011; 7:30 pm		Western Michigan	W 83–71	14–10 (5–5)	Rhodes Arena (2,826); Akron, OH
February 12, 2011; 7:30 pm		Ball State	W 75–60	15–10 (6–5)	Rhodes Arena (3,401); Akron, OH
February 15, 2011; 7:00 pm		at Bowling Arena	W 89–54	16–10 (7–5)	Anderson Arena (1,445); Bowling Green, OH
February 19, 2011*; 7:00 pm		Creighton; ESPN BracketBusters	W 76–67	17–10	Rhodes Arena (2,861); Akron, OH
February 23, 2011; 7:00 pm		Miami (OH)	W 72–55	18–10 (8–5)	Rhodes Arena (2,700); Akron, OH
February 26, 2011; 7:00 pm		Buffalo	W 69–60	19–10 (9–5)	Rhodes Arena (3,688); Akron, OH
March 1, 2011; 7:00 pm		Ohio	L 55–80	19–11 (9–6)	Convocation Center (8,630); Athens, OH
March 4, 2011; 7:00 pm		Kent State	L 68–79	19–12 (9–7)	M.A.C. Center (6,327); Kent, OH
MAC tournament
March 8, 2011; 7:00 pm	(6)	(11) Eastern Michigan; MAC First Round	W 67–53	20–12	Rhodes Arena (1,431); Akron, OH
March 10, 2011; 2:30 pm	(6)	vs. (3) Miami (OH); MAC Quarterfinals	W 82–75 ^{2OT}	21–12	Quicken Loans Arena (3,311); Cleveland, OH
March 11, 2011; 7:00 pm	(6)	vs. (2) Western Michigan; MAC Semifinals	W 79–68	22–12	Quicken Loans Arena (6,174); Cleveland, OH
March 12, 2011; 6:00 pm	(6)	vs. (1) Kent State; MAC Championship Game	W 66–65 ^{OT}	23–12	Quicken Loans Arena (8,926); Cleveland, OH
NCAA tournament
March 18, 2011; 1:40 pm	(15 SW)	vs. (2 SW) No. 5 Notre Dame; NCAA Second Round	L 56–69	23–13	United Center (17,352); Chicago, IL
*Non-conference game. ^{#}Rankings from AP Poll. (#) Tournament seedings in parentheses. SW=NCAA Southwest Regional. All times are in Eastern Time. Source
