= 2010–11 Western Michigan Broncos men's basketball team =

American college basketball season

2010–11 Western Michigan Broncos men's basketball

MAC West Division Champions

CIT, Second round
- Conference: Mid-American Conference
- West Division
- Record: 21–13 (11–5 MAC)
- Head coach: Steve Hawkins
- Assistant coaches: Rick Carter; Jeff Dunlap; Larry Farmer
- Home arena: University Arena

2010–11 Mid-American Conference men's basketball standings
	Conf.				Overall
Team	W		L	PCT	W		L	PCT
East
Kent State	12	–	4	.750	25	–	12	.676
Miami (OH)	11	–	5	.688	16	–	17	.485
Ohio	9	–	7	.563	19	–	16	.543
Akron †	9	–	7	.563	23	–	13	.639
Bowling Green	8	–	8	.500	14	–	19	.424
Buffalo	8	–	8	.500	20	–	14	.588
West
Western Michigan	11	–	5	.688	21	–	13	.618
Ball State	10	–	6	.625	19	–	13	.594
Central Michigan	7	–	9	.438	10	–	21	.323
Northern Illinois	5	–	11	.313	9	–	21	.300
Eastern Michigan	5	–	11	.313	9	–	22	.290
Toledo	1	–	15	.063	4	–	28	.125
† Conference tournament winner Rankings from AP Poll

The 2010–11 Western Michigan Broncos men's basketball team were the National Collegiate Athletic Association Division I college basketball team representing Western Michigan University. WMU was coached by Steve Hawkins who was in his eighth season as head coach of the school. The Broncos played their home games at University Arena in Kalamazoo, Michigan.

== Roster ==
No.	Name	Pos.	Height	Weight	Year	Hometown (Previous school)
25	David Brown	G	6'3"	208	So.	Roscoe, IL (Hononegah)
32	Muhammed Conteh	F/C	6'7"	238	Jr.	Bloomington, IN (Providence School)
30	Caleb Dean	C	6'9"	230	Jr.	Novi, MI (Midland College)
5	Mike Douglas	G	6'0"	175	Jr.	Detroit, MI (Finney)
22	Juwan Howard Jr.	F	6'6"	210	Fr.	Detroit, MI (Pershing High School)
11	Nate Hutcheson	F	6'7"	210	So.	Marion, IA (Linn-Mar)
42	Dan Loney	F	6'4"	208	So.	Benzonia, MI (Benzie Central)
10	Brandon Pokley	G	6'4"	182	So.	Clarkston, MI (Clarkston)
40	Matt Stainbrook	C	6'9"	290	Fr.	Bay Village, OH (Lakewood St. Edward)
52	Nick Stapert	C	6'8"	237	R-Fr.	Gobles, MI (Gobles)
12	Ed Thomas	G	5'9"	159	Jr.	Lansing, MI (Rockford College)
1	Demetrius Ward	G	6'3"	212	Jr.	Detroit, MI (Pershing)
33	Flenard Whitfield	F	6'7"	230	Jr.	Detroit, MI (Martin Luther King)
21	Shayne Whittington	C	6'10"	220	So.	Paw Paw, MI (Lawrence)
15	Alex Wolf	G	6'0"	198	Sr.	Parchment, MI (Parchment)

== Schedule ==
Date time, TV	Rank^{#}	Opponent^{#}	Result	Record	Site (attendance) city, state
Regular season
November 12, 2010*; 7:00 pm, FS Ohio		at Xavier	L 65–68	0–1	Cintas Center (10,250); Cincinnati, OH
November 20, 2010*; 7:00 pm		Loyola Chicago	L 64–82	0–2	University Arena (3,026); Kalamazoo, MI
November 23, 2010*; 8:00 pm		at Milwaukee	W 67–55	1–2	U.S. Cellular Arena (1,807); Milwaukee, WI
November 27, 2010*; 1:00 pm		No. 19 Illinois	L 63–78	1–3	University Arena (4,532); Kalamazoo, MI
December 1, 2010*; 7:00 pm		at Towson	L 73–75	1–4	Towson Center (1,483); Towson, MD
December 4, 2010*; 2:00 pm		Alma	W 109–50	2–4	University Arena (2,319); Kalamazoo, MI
December 8, 2010*; 7:00 pm		Detroit	W 71–69	3–4	University Arena (2,668); Kalamazoo, MI
December 11, 2010*; 8:00 pm		at Georgia State	W 61–59	4–4	GSU Sports Arena (901); Atlanta, GA
December 18, 2010*; 2:00 pm		South Dakota State	W 77–74	5–4	University Arena; Kalamazoo, MI
December 21, 2010*; 7:30 pm		vs. Troy; World Vision Invitational	L 99–102 ^{OT}	5–5	Smith Spectrum (1,221); Logan, UT
December 22, 2010*; 10:05 pm		at Utah State; World Vision Invitational	L 57–78	5–6	Smith Spectrum (7,975); Logan, UT
December 23, 2010*; 7:30 pm		vs. Idaho State; World Vision Invitational	W 63–60	6–6	Smith Spectrum (1,478); Logan, UT
December 31, 2010*; 2:00 pm		Eastern Illinois	W 69–60	7–6	University Arena (2,846); Kalamazoo, MI
January 9, 2011; 2:00 pm		Central Michigan; Michigan MAC Trophy	W 63–56 ^{OT}	8–6 (1–0)	University Arena (3,476); Kalamazoo, MI
January 12, 2011; 7:30 pm, SportsTime Ohio		at Ball State	L 63–72	8–7 (1–1)	John E. Worthen Arena (3,601); Muncie, IN
January 16, 2011; 2:00 pm		Eastern Michigan; Michigan MAC Trophy	W 65–48	9–7 (2–1)	University Arena (2,747); Kalamazoo, MI
January 19, 2011; 7:00 pm		at Toledo	L 60–73	9–8 (2–2)	Savage Arena (4,073); Toledo, OH
January 22, 2011; 2:00 pm		Northern Illinois	W 82–80	10–8 (3–2)	University Arena (3,311); Kalamazoo, MI
January 25, 2011; 7:00 pm		Buffalo	L 68–79	10–9 (3–3)	University Arena (2,471); Kalamazoo, MI
January 29, 2011; 4:30 pm		at Miami	W 73–68 ^{OT}	11–9 (4–3)	Millett Hall (3,178); Oxford, OH
February 5, 2011; 5:00 pm		at Bowling Green	W 75–61	12–9 (5–3)	Anderson Arena (2,476); Bowling Green, OH
February 9, 11; 7:30 pm, SportsTime Ohio		at Akron	L 71–83	12–10 (5–4)	James A. Rhodes Arena (2,826); Akron, OH
February 12, 2011; 4:30 pm		Ohio	W 85–83	13–10 (6–4)	University Arena (3,565); Kalamazoo, MI
February 15, 2011		at Northern Illinois	W 77–65	14–10 (7–4)	Convocation Center; DeKalb, IL
February 19, 2011*		Illinois State; ESPN BracketBusters	W 68–65	15–10	University Arena; Kalamazoo, MI
February 21, 2011		Kent State	L 72–74	15–11 (7–5)	University Arena; Kalamazoo, MI
February 23, 2011		Toledo	W 68–56	16–11 (8–5)	University Arena; Kalamazoo, MI
February 27, 2011		at Eastern Michigan; Michigan MAC Trophy	W 87–60	17–11 (9–5)	Convocation Center; Ypsilanti, MI
March 2, 2011		Ball State	W 87–70	18–11 (10–5)	University Arena; Kalamazoo, MI
March 5, 2011; 2:00 pm		at Central Michigan; Michigan MAC Trophy	W 81–68	19–11 (11–5)	McGuirk Arena (3,024); Mount Pleasant, MI
MAC tournament
March 10, 2011*; 12:00 pm, SportsTime Ohio	(2)	vs. (7) Bowling Green; MAC Quarterfinals	W 67–56	20–11	Quicken Loans Arena; Cleveland, OH
March 11, 2011*; 7:00 pm, SportsTime Ohio	(2)	vs. (6) Akron; Semifinals	L 68–79	20–12	Quicken Loans Arena; Cleveland, OH
CollegeInsider.com tournament
March 16, 2011; 7:00 pm		Tennessee Tech; CIT First round	W 74–66	21–12	University Arena (1,628); Kalamazoo, MI
March 19, 2011; 2:00 pm		Buffalo; CIT Second round	L 48–49	21–13	University Arena; Kalamazoo, MI
*Non-conference game. ^{#}Rankings from AP Poll. (#) Tournament seedings in parentheses. All times are in Eastern Time.
