= 2011 MAC men's basketball tournament =

- 2011 MAC Tournament logo
- Classification: Division I
- Season: 2010–11
- Teams: 12
- Site: Quicken Loans Arena; Cleveland, Ohio
- Champions: Akron Zips (2nd title)
- Winning coach: Keith Dambrot (2nd title)
- MVP: Zeke Marshall (Akron)
- Television: SportsTime Ohio and ESPN2
- MAC men's basketball tournaments

The 2011 Mid-American Conference men's basketball tournament was the post-season men's basketball tournament for the Mid-American Conference (MAC) 2010–11 season. Sixth-seeded Akron defeated Kent State in the MAC tournament final in overtime and represented the MAC in the NCAA tournament where they lost in the first round to Notre Dame.

2010–11 Mid-American Conference men's basketball standings
	Conf.				Overall
Team	W		L	PCT	W		L	PCT
East
Kent State	12	–	4	.750	25	–	12	.676
Miami (OH)	11	–	5	.688	16	–	17	.485
Ohio	9	–	7	.563	19	–	16	.543
Akron †	9	–	7	.563	23	–	13	.639
Bowling Green	8	–	8	.500	14	–	19	.424
Buffalo	8	–	8	.500	20	–	14	.588
West
Western Michigan	11	–	5	.688	21	–	13	.618
Ball State	10	–	6	.625	19	–	13	.594
Central Michigan	7	–	9	.438	10	–	21	.323
Northern Illinois	5	–	11	.313	9	–	21	.300
Eastern Michigan	5	–	11	.313	9	–	22	.290
Toledo	1	–	15	.063	4	–	28	.125
† Conference tournament winner Rankings from AP Poll

== Format ==
Each of the 12 men's basketball teams in the MAC receives a berth in the conference tournament. Teams are seeded by conference record with the following two-team tiebreakers:

- Head-to-head competition
- Division record (10 games)
- Winning percentage vs. ranked conference teams (top to bottom, regardless of division, vs. common opponents regardless of the number of times played)
- Coin flip

For multiple team ties:

- Total won-lost record of games played among the tied teams
- Two-team tie-breaker procedure goes into effect

Once a three-team tie has been reduced to two teams, the two-team tiebreaker will go into effect.

The top four seeds received byes into the quarterfinals. The winners of each division were awarded the #1 and #2 seeds. The team with the best record of the two received the #1 seed. First round games were played on campus sites at the higher seed. The remaining rounds were held at Quicken Loans Arena.

== Bracket ==
First round Campus sites March 8
8	Buffalo	64
9	Central Michigan	50
5	Ohio	74
12	Toledo	57
7	Bowling Green	74
10	Northern Illinois	54
6	Akron	67
11	Eastern Michigan	53

Quarterfinals; Quicken Loans Arena; March 10
1	Kent State	73
8	Buffalo	62
4	Ball State	76*
5	Ohio	73
2	Western Michigan	67
7	Bowling Green	56
3	Miami (OH)	75
6	Akron	82**

Semifinals; Quicken Loans Arena; March 11
1	Kent State	79
4	Ball State	68
2	Western Michigan	68
6	Akron	79

Championship game Quicken Loans Arena; March 12
1	Kent State	65
6	Akron	66*

Asterisk denotes game ended in overtime.

=== Tiebreakers ===
Seed	Team	Record	Tiebreaker #1
1	Kent State	12–4	–
2	Western Michigan	11–5	Division champ
3	Miami	11–5	–
4	Ball State	10–6	–
5	Ohio	9–7	2–0 head-to-head
6	Akron	9–7	0–2 head-to-head
7	Bowling Green	8–8	2–0 head-to-head
8	Buffalo	8–8	0–2 head-to-head
9	Central Michigan	7–9	–
10	Northern Illinois	5–11	2–0 head-to-head
11	Eastern Michigan	5–11	0–2 head-to-head
12	Toledo	1–15	–

=== Championship game ===
In the championship game, Akron defeated Kent State 66–65. Senior Brett McKnight led Akron with 15 points and scored the final two points of the game, hitting two free throws to put his team up by one. With 12 seconds to go in the overtime period, Kent State had the ball and a chance to win, but Zeke Marshall blocked Kent State's first attempt and the second attempt was deflected. As Akron celebrated after the final buzzer, one of the Kent State players, who had laid down on the court in disappointment, was accidentally stepped on by the jumping mob of Akron players, and a slight skirmish broke out after his teammates came to his defense.

The Akron Zips advanced to their third NCAA Tournament of the Division I era. They would go on to lose to Notre Dame in their first game.

== All-Tournament Team ==
Tournament MVP – Zeke Marshall, Akron

Player	Team
Jarrod Jones	Ball State
Michael Porrini	Kent State
Justin Greene	Kent State
Brett McKnight	Akron
Zeke Marshall	Akron
