= 2010–11 Miami RedHawks men's basketball team =

American college basketball season

2010–11 Miami RedHawks men's basketball

CBI, First round
- Conference: Mid-American Conference
- East Division
- Record: 16–17 (11–5 MAC)
- Head coach: Charlie Coles (15th season)
- Assistant coaches: Jermaine Henderson (14th season); Jason Grunkemeyer (4th season); Jimmy Lallathin (1st season)
- Home arena: Millett Hall

2010–11 Mid-American Conference men's basketball standings
	Conf.				Overall
Team	W		L	PCT	W		L	PCT
East
Kent State	12	–	4	.750	25	–	12	.676
Miami (OH)	11	–	5	.688	16	–	17	.485
Ohio	9	–	7	.563	19	–	16	.543
Akron †	9	–	7	.563	23	–	13	.639
Bowling Green	8	–	8	.500	14	–	19	.424
Buffalo	8	–	8	.500	20	–	14	.588
West
Western Michigan	11	–	5	.688	21	–	13	.618
Ball State	10	–	6	.625	19	–	13	.594
Central Michigan	7	–	9	.438	10	–	21	.323
Northern Illinois	5	–	11	.313	9	–	21	.300
Eastern Michigan	5	–	11	.313	9	–	22	.290
Toledo	1	–	15	.063	4	–	28	.125
† Conference tournament winner Rankings from AP Poll

The 2010–11 Miami RedHawks men's basketball team represented Miami University in the 2010–11 NCAA Division I men's basketball season. The RedHawks, led by head coach Charlie Coles, played their home games at Millett Hall in Oxford, Ohio, as members of the Mid-American Conference. The RedHawks finished second in the MAC's East Division during the regular season, and earned the third seed in the MAC tournament. Miami was upset in their first game, losing in the quarterfinals to eventual tournament champion Akron.

Miami failed to qualify for the NCAA tournament, but were invited to the 2011 College Basketball Invitational. The RedHawks were eliminated in the first round of the CBI in a loss to Rhode Island, 76–59.

== Roster ==
2010–11 Miami RedHawks men's basketball team
Players
Coaches

Pos.	#	Name	Height	Weight	Year	Hometown
G/F	1	Josh Sewell	6 ft 5 in (1.96 m)	—	Fr	Louisville, Kentucky
G	2	Quinten Rollins	—	—	Fr	Wilmington, Ohio
G	3	Allen Roberts	6 ft 3 in (1.91 m)	—	So	Middletown, Ohio
F	4	Julian Mavunga	6 ft 8 in (2.03 m)	—	Jr	Indianapolis, IN
F	11	Sean Mock	6 ft 6 in (1.98 m)	—	RS Sr	Oxford, Ohio
F	12	Bill Edwards	6 ft 6 in (1.98 m)	—	So	Middletown, Ohio
G	15	Orlando Williams	6 ft 4 in (1.93 m)	—	So	Cincinnati, Ohio
F	20	Nick Winbush	6 ft 7 in (2.01 m)	—	Sr	Shaker Heights, Ohio
G	24	Chris McHenry	5 ft 11 in (1.8 m)	—	Jr	Milwaukee, Wisconsin
F	25	Jon Harris	6 ft 8 in (2.03 m)	—	Fr	Twinsburg, Ohio
G/F	35	Antonio Ballard	6 ft 4 in (1.93 m)	—	RS Sr	Jeffersonville, Indiana
F	40	Adam Thomas	6 ft 7 in (2.01 m)	—	RS Jr	Springboro, Ohio
C	50	Drew McGhee	6 ft 11 in (2.11 m)	—	RS Fr	North Ridgeville, Ohio
C	55	Vince Legarza	6 ft 9 in (2.06 m)	—	RS So	San Francisco, California

Head coach

- Charlie Coles (Miami (OH))

Assistant coach(es)

- Jermaine Henderson (Miami (OH))
- Jason Grunkemeyer (Miami (OH))
- Jimmy Lallathin (Miami (OH))

Legend

- (C) Team captain
- (S) Suspended
- (I) Ineligible
- (W) Walk-on
- Injured
- Current redshirt

Roster

== Schedule and results ==
Date time, TV	Rank^{#}	Opponent^{#}	Result	Record	Site (attendance) city, state
Exhibition
November 6, 2010*		Ohio Northern	W 90–51	—	Millett Hall; Oxford, OH
Regular season
November 12, 2010*; 6:00 pm		Towson	W 60–57	1–0	Millett Hall (2,221); Oxford, OH
November 16, 2010*; 7:30 pm		at No. 1 Duke; CBE Classic	L 45–79	1–1	Cameron Indoor Stadium (9,314); Durham, NC
November 20, 2010*; 8:00 pm		IUPUI; CBE Classic	W 59–58	2–1	Millett Hall (2,117); Oxford, OH
November 21, 2010*; 8:00 pm		Green Bay; CBE Classic	L 65–69	2–2	Millett Hall (1,863); Oxford, OH
November 22, 2010*; 7:00 pm		No. 18 San Diego State; CBE Classic	L 56–77	2–3	Millett Hall (1,858); Oxford, OH
November 26, 2010*; 4:00 pm		at No. 3 Ohio State	L 45–66	2–4	Value City Arena (15,935); Columbus, OH
December 1, 2010*; 7:00 pm		Xavier	W 75–64	3–4	Millett Hall (3,945); Oxford, OH
December 4, 2010*; 8:00 pm		at Dayton	L 58–70	3–5	UD Arena (13,435); Dayton, OH
December 7, 2010*; 7:00 pm		Saginaw Valley State	W 76–57	4–5	Millett Hall (1,518); Oxford, OH
December 11, 2010*; 4:30 pm		Troy	W 80–73	5–5	Millett Hall (1,909); Oxford, OH
December 18, 2010*; 7:00 pm		at Wright State	L 51–66	5–6	Nutter Center (4,580); Dayton, OH
December 21, 2010*; 7:00 pm		Cincinnati	L 48–64	5–7	Millett Hall (3,297); Oxford, OH
December 30, 2010*; 2:30 pm		at Belmont	L 72–83	5–8	Curb Event Center (1,198); Nashville, TN
January 2, 2011*; 6:00 pm		at No. 3 Kansas	L 56–83	5–9	Allen Fieldhouse (16,300); Lawrence, KS
January 9, 2011; 2:00 pm		at Ohio	W 92–88 ^{3OT}	6–9 (1–0)	Convocation Center (9,749); Athens, OH
January 13, 2011; 7:00 pm		Buffalo	W 70–67	7–9 (2–0)	Millett Hall (2,057); Oxford, OH
January 16, 2011; 2:00 pm		at Bowling Green	L 53–62	7–10 (2–1)	Stroh Center (2,367); Bowling Green, OH
January 19, 2011; 7:00 pm		Akron	W 84–76	8–10 (3–1)	Millett Hall (1,741); Oxford, OH
January 23, 2011; 2:00 pm		at Kent State	L 57–78	8–11 (3–2)	MAC Center (4,135); Kent, OH
January 27, 2011; 7:00 pm		at Central Michigan	W 68–58	9–11 (4–2)	McGuirk Arena (1,852); Mount Pleasant, MI
January 29, 2011; 4:30 pm		Western Michigan	L 68–73 ^{OT}	9–12 (4–3)	Millett Hall (3,178); Oxford, OH
February 1, 2011; 7:00 pm		Ball State	W 89–75	10–12 (5–3)	Millett Hall (1,216); Oxford, OH
February 5, 2011; 4:30 pm		at Eastern Michigan	W 58–56	11–12 (6–3)	Convocation Center (1,178); Ypsilanti, MI
February 9, 2011; 7:00 pm		Northern Illinois	W 84–72	12–12 (7–3)	Millett Hall (1,652); Oxford, OH
February 12, 2011; 7:00 pm		at Toledo	W 68–66	13–12 (8–3)	Savage Arena (4,837); Toledo, OH
February 16, 2011; 7:00 pm		Kent State	W 86–80 ^{OT}	14–12 (9–3)	Millett Hall (2,173); Oxford, OH
February 19, 2011*; 7:30 pm, ESPN3		at James Madison; ESPN BracketBusters	L 69–70	14–13	JMU Convocation Center (4,283); Harrisonburg, VA
February 23, 2011; 7:00 pm		at Akron	L 55–72	14–14 (9–4)	Rhodes Arena (2,700); Akron, OH
February 26, 2011; 11:00 am		Bowling Green	W 84–77	15–14 (10–4)	Millett Hall (2,078); Oxford, OH
March 2, 2011; 7:30 pm		at Buffalo	L 49–59	15–15 (10–5)	Alumni Arena (2,507); Buffalo, NY
March 4, 2011; 7:00 pm		Ohio	W 76–66	16–15 (11–5)	Millett Hall (2,526); Oxford, OH
MAC tournament
March 10, 2011; 2:30 pm	(3)	vs. (6) Akron; MAC Quarterfinals	L 75–82 ^{OT}	16–16	Quicken Loans Arena (3,311); Cleveland, OH
CBI
March 16, 2011; 7:00 pm		at Rhode Island; CBI First Round	L 59–76	16–17	Ryan Center (1,115); Kingston, RI
*Non-conference game. ^{#}Rankings from AP Poll. (#) Tournament seedings in parentheses. All times are in Eastern Time.
