= Keith Dambrot =

American basketball coach (born 1958)

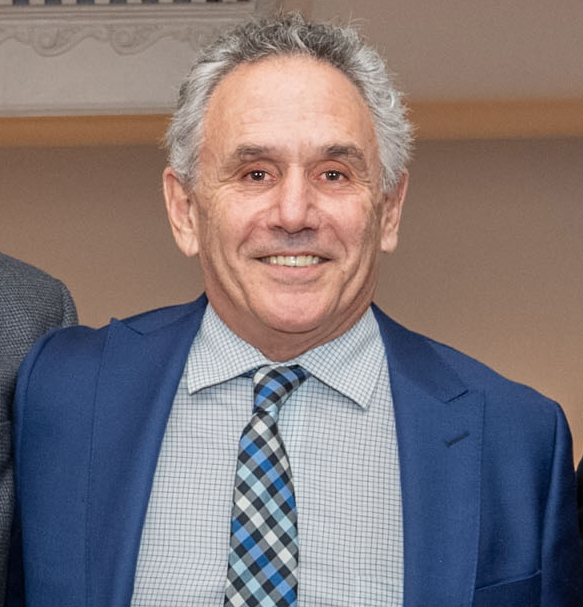
- Dambrot in 2023

Biographical details
- Born: October 26, 1958 (age 68); Akron, Ohio, U.S.
- Education: Akron ('82)

Coaching career (HC unless noted)
- 1982–1984: Akron (assistant)
- 1984–1986: Tiffin
- 1986–1989: Eastern Michigan (assistant)
- 1989–1991: Ashland
- 1991–1993: Central Michigan
- 1998–2001: St. Vincent–St. Mary HS
- 2001–2004: Akron (assistant)
- 2004–2017: Akron
- 2017–2024: Duquesne

Head coaching record
- Overall: 529–305 (college); 69–10 (high school)
- Tournaments: 1–4 (NCAA Division I); 3–2 (NCAA Division II); 3–5 (NIT); 0–1 (CIT); 0–1 (CBI)

Accomplishments and honors

Championships
- 3 MAC tournament (2009, 2011, 2013); 4 MAC regular season (2012, 2013, 2016, 2017); 5 MAC East Division (2007, 2012, 2013, 2016, 2017); Atlantic 10 tournament (2024)

Awards
- 3× MAC Coach of the Year (2013, 2016, 2017)

Keith Brett Dambrot (born October 26, 1958) is an American former college basketball coach who was most recently the men's basketball head coach of Duquesne University. In his final year, he led them to their first tournament appearance since 1977, and first tournament win since 1969.

During his high school head coaching career, he coached future NBA star LeBron James for two years. During 13 seasons of head coaching at the University of Akron, he had a regular game season 305–139 record and was the winningest coach in the program's history.

He is a three-time Mid-American Conference Coach of the Year. In 2010, he was elected into the Summit County Sports Hall of Fame, and in 2013 he won the Red Auerbach Coach of the Year Award as the country's top Jewish college basketball coach.

== Early life ==
Dambrot was born in Akron, Ohio, and is Jewish. Dambrot's mother, Faye, was a psychology professor at the University of Akron while he was growing up. His father Sid Dambrot played on Duquesne Dukes men's basketball teams that were ranked No. 1 in the nation from 1952 to 1954. His uncle Irwin Dambrot played basketball for the 1950 City College of New York (CCNY) team, the only school to win both the NCAA Tournament and the NIT in the same season, and was the MVP of the NCAA tournament that season and the No. 1 draft pick (selected seventh overall) by the New York Knicks in the 1950 NBA draft.

Dambrot attended Firestone High School, playing baseball and point guard in basketball for the school teams. In college at the University of Akron, he played third base on the Akron Zips baseball team (of which he was captain and MVP) for the school, establishing what at the time was a school record for career hit by pitch, with 28. He graduated in 1982 with a degree in management. In 1984 he earned an MBA from the University of Akron.

== Early coaching career ==
His first basketball coaching job came while he was a college student, when he helped coach the high school junior varsity at his alma mater Firestone, and they won the Akron City Series JV championship.

Upon graduating college, he started as an assistant basketball coach at Akron.

Dambrot began his head coaching career at Division II schools Tiffin University for two seasons from 1984 to 1986 and at Ashland University for two seasons from 1989 to 1991, At Ashland, he led his team each year into the NCAA D-II men's basketball tournament. In between, he was an assistant coach at Eastern Michigan University.

== Central Michigan University ==
At 32 years of age, Dambrot replaced Charlie Coles as coach of Central Michigan University for the 1991–92 season. He coached the team for two seasons, and was fired for making a controversial comment before a game against Miami University. He had asked the players if he could use a controversial word (the "N-word") in addressing the team before he actually did, and they agreed, but he still was fired. He sued the university in a wrongful discrimination lawsuit, and all 11 black players on the team joined his lawsuit in support of Dambrot, claiming the university's policy against discriminatory language was too vague. He eventually lost the suit, though the students prevailed in overturning the school's language policy.

== St. Vincent-St. Mary High School ==
The incident at Central Michigan essentially blackballed Dambrot from college coaching. Dambrot was only able to coach at the Akron Jewish Community Center and in some summer leagues. In 1998, he became the head coach at St. Vincent–St. Mary HS in Akron, Ohio. During his three seasons there, he guided the Fighting Irish to a 69–10 record. During the last two years of his tenure as coach there, future NBA star LeBron James was on his squad, and they won two consecutive state championships, as well as were nationally ranked. James took part in $1 clinics Dambrot conducted at the local Jewish Community Center. Before playing for Dambrot, James had met with him, and followed up on the accusations made about him during his stint at Central Michigan. In his book, Shooting Stars, James said that he did not believe that Dambrot was a racist.

== University of Akron ==
Dambrot left St. Vincent-St. Mary in 2001 to return to coaching as an assistant at the collegiate level at his alma mater, the University of Akron. After becoming the head coach of Akron in 2004, Dambrot led the Zips to 19 victories in Dambrot's first season (2004–05). Akron was one of only four schools - along with Duke, Gonzaga, and Kansas - to win 21 or more games in 12 seasons before Dambrot left in 2017. During his tenure, he led Akron to the postseason in 10 seasons – participating in the NCAA Tournament in 2009, 2011, and 2013; the National Invitation Tournament in 2006, 2008, 2012, 2016, and 2017; the College Basketball Invitational (CBI) in 2010, in the CollegeInsider.com Postseason Tournament (CIT) in 2012. The Zips won at least 21 games in each of his last 12 seasons – a feat unmatched in program history.

In his first seven seasons in charge of the program, Akron amassed a 162–75 (.684) overall record, including an 80–36 mark in MAC play and a 91–15 tally in home games (50–8 in MAC play at home). Those 162 victories tied for the most by a MAC team and tied for 29th-best nationally during that seven-season span. In 13 seasons as a collegiate head coach he owned a 270–145 (.651) overall record. Dambrot entered the season in fifth place in league history with a .628 win percentage while coaching in the MAC (182–109 overall; 162–75 Akron, 20–34 CMU), eighth in overall wins (182), 11th in league games winning percentage (.600, 90–60) and 10th in conference wins (90).

Named the 2009 Best Mid-Major Coach by Dan Wetzel of Yahoo Sports, Dambrot's time at UA was highlighted by mentoring a total of 20 All-MAC honorees, 10 MAC All-Tournament selections, two tournament MVPs, and one player of the year honor. Also during his watch, seven players were added to the school's 1,000-point scorer's list and he coached Akron's all-time assists leader (Dru Joyce III, 503), all-time blocked shots leader (Romeo Travis, 165), all-time winningest player (Chris McKnight, 97 victories over a four-season span) and the all-time games played leader (Steve McNees, 141).

The list of accolades received by UA players included Romeo Travis being named Honorable Mention All-America (the program's first such honoree since 1989) and MAC Player of the Year (first in program history) in 2007, Cedrick Middleton (2007) and Brett McKnight (2009) earning MAC Sixth Man of the Year (only two honors of that kind in program history), and Nate Linhart (2009) and Jimmy Conyers (2010) being selected as the MAC Defensive Player of the Year. Linhart also earned league tournament MVP honors in 2009. In 2011, Zeke Marshall earned league tournament MVP honors after helping the Zips to their second MAC title in three seasons.

In 2010, Dambrot was elected into the Summit County Sports Hall of Fame for his contributions at Akron St. Vincent-St. Mary High School and at The University of Akron as both a student-athlete and head coach. He was also a finalist for the Red Auerbach Coach of the Year Award, which is awarded by the Jewish Coaches Association. In 2013, he won the Red Auerbach Coach of the Year Award as the country's top Jewish college basketball coach, and was named the MAC Coach of the Year.

Dambrot left Akron after 13 seasons, with a 305–139 record, as the winningest coach in school history. He won back-to-back Mid-American Conference regular season titles in 2016 and 2017, and coach of the year honors those seasons. The team averaged 23.5 wins during his tenure.

== Duquesne University ==
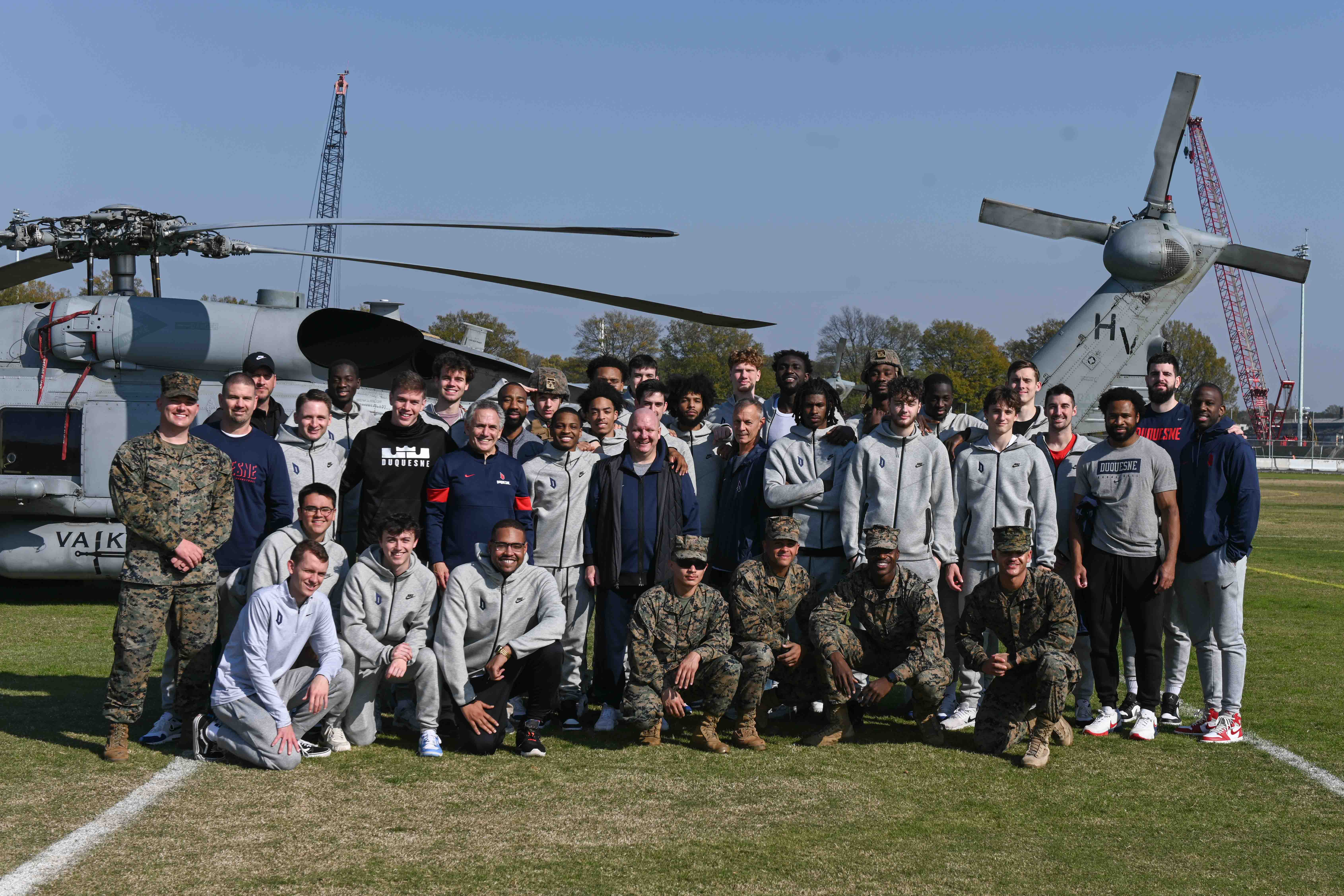
Dambrot with the 2023–24 Duquesne Dukes

On March 30, 2017, Dambrot was named the 17th head coach at Duquesne in the school's 101-year history. He signed a 7-year, $7 million contract. The Dukes had finished 10-22 the season before he took over as head coach. Duquesne improved to 16-16 while finishing 10th in the Atlantic 10 in its first season under Dambrot. In his second season as head coach, Dambrot led the school to its first winning record since the 2011–12 season with 19 wins and 13 losses. Duquesne ended the season sixth in the Atlantic 10, the program's best finish since it finished fourth in the 2010–11 season.

The 2019/2020 season saw a better start for Duquesne and Dambrot. The Dukes started the season 10–0, the best start since the 1953/1954 season. Duquesne went 11–7 in conference play and tied for 5th place in the A10. The 2020 A10 Tournament and subsequent March Madness tournaments were canceled due to the COVID-19 pandemic.

Steady growth and improvement under Dambrot paid off for the Dukes in 2024, as they won four consecutive games to claim the 2024 Atlantic 10 men's basketball tournament and their first NCAA Tournament bid since 1977. A day after their place in the Big Dance was clinched, Dambrot announced he would be retiring from coaching at the end of the tournament to help take care of his wife, who had been diagnosed with breast cancer the previous year. The No. 11–seeded Dukes upset the No. 6–seeded BYU squad 71-67, before falling to Illinois in the second round.

== Personal life ==
Dambrot is married to his wife Donna. Their son, Robby Dambrot, is a professional soccer player.

== Head coaching record ==
=== College ===
Record table
Season	Team	Overall	Conference	Standing	Postseason
Tiffin Dragons (NCAA Division II independent) (1984–1986)
1984–85	Tiffin	16–14			
1985–86	Tiffin	24–9			
Tiffin:		40–23 (.635)			
Ashland Eagles (Great Lakes Valley Conference) (1989–1991)
1989–90	Ashland	22–8	13–5	T–2nd	NCAA Division II Second Round
1990–91	Ashland	26–5	14–4	T–1st	NCAA Division II Elite Eight
Ashland:		48–13 (.787)	27–9 (.750)		
Central Michigan Chippewas (Mid-American Conference) (1991–1993)
1991–92	Central Michigan	12–16	6–10	T–6th	
1992–93	Central Michigan	8–18	4–14	9th	
Central Michigan:		20–34 (.370)	10–24 (.294)		
Akron Zips (Mid-American Conference) (2004–2017)
2004–05	Akron	19–10	11–7	T–2nd (East)	
2005–06	Akron	23–10	14–4	T–2nd (East)	NIT Second Round
2006–07	Akron	26–7	13–3	1st (East)	
2007–08	Akron	24–11	11–5	2nd (East)	NIT Second Round
2008–09	Akron	23–13	10–6	3rd (East)	NCAA Division I Round of 64
2009–10	Akron	24–11	12–4	2nd (East)	CBI First Round
2010–11	Akron	23–13	9–7	T–3rd (East)	NCAA Division I Round of 64
2011–12	Akron	22–12	13–3	1st (East)	NIT First Round
2012–13	Akron	26–7	14–2	T–1st (East)	NCAA Division I Round of 64
2013–14	Akron	21–13	12–6	2nd (East)	CIT First Round
2014–15	Akron	21–14	9–9	4th (East)	
2015–16	Akron	26–9	13–5	1st (East)	NIT First Round
2016–17	Akron	27–9	14–4	1st (East)	NIT Second Round
Akron:		305–139 (.687)	155–65 (.705)		
Duquesne Dukes (Atlantic 10 Conference) (2017–2024)
2017–18	Duquesne	16–16	7–11	T–10th	
2018–19	Duquesne	19–13	10–8	T–6th	
2019–20	Duquesne	21–9	11–7	T–5th	
2020–21	Duquesne	9–9	7–7	9th	
2021–22	Duquesne	6–24	1–16	14th	
2022–23	Duquesne	20–13	10–8	T–6th	CBI First Round
2023–24	Duquesne	25–12	10–8	6th	NCAA Division I Round of 32
Duquesne:		116–96 (.547)	58–65 (.472)		
Total:		529–305 (.634)			
National champion Postseason invitational champion Conference regular season champion Conference regular season and conference tournament champion Division regular season champion Division regular season and conference tournament champion Conference tournament champion

== See also ==
- List of current NCAA Division I men's basketball coaches
