= 2010–11 Northern Illinois Huskies men's basketball team =

American college basketball season

2010–11 Northern Illinois Huskies men's basketball
- Conference: Mid-American Conference
- West Division
- Record: 9–21 (5–11 MAC)
- Head coach: Ricardo Patton
- Assistant coaches: Sundance Wicks; Will Smith; Todd Townsend
- Home arena: Convocation Center

2010–11 Mid-American Conference men's basketball standings
	Conf.				Overall
Team	W		L	PCT	W		L	PCT
East
Kent State	12	–	4	.750	25	–	12	.676
Miami (OH)	11	–	5	.688	16	–	17	.485
Ohio	9	–	7	.563	19	–	16	.543
Akron †	9	–	7	.563	23	–	13	.639
Bowling Green	8	–	8	.500	14	–	19	.424
Buffalo	8	–	8	.500	20	–	14	.588
West
Western Michigan	11	–	5	.688	21	–	13	.618
Ball State	10	–	6	.625	19	–	13	.594
Central Michigan	7	–	9	.438	10	–	21	.323
Northern Illinois	5	–	11	.313	9	–	21	.300
Eastern Michigan	5	–	11	.313	9	–	22	.290
Toledo	1	–	15	.063	4	–	28	.125
† Conference tournament winner Rankings from AP Poll

The 2010–11 Northern Illinois Huskies men's basketball team represented Northern Illinois University in the college basketball season of 2010–11. The team, led by head coached by Ricardo Patton, were members of the Mid-American Conference and played their homes game at the Convocation Center in DeKalb, Illinois. The Huskies lost to Bowling Green in the first round of the 2011 MAC tournament.

== Roster ==
Name	Number	Position	Height	Weight	Year	Hometown
Aksel Bolin	32	G/F	6–7	200	Freshman	Asker, Norway
Antone Christian	3	G	6–2	189	Freshman	Nashville, TN
Tre Edwards	2	G	6–0	172	Freshman	Racine, WI
Demarcus Grady		G	6–1	203	Junior	Grand Rapids, MI
Lee Fisher	30	F	6–5	212	Junior	Dolton, IL
Bryan Hall	1	G	6–1	186	Junior	Chicago, IL
Kyree Jones	55	G	6–2	205	Freshman	Indianapolis, IN
Jeremy Landers	24	G	6–2	185	Senior	Milwaukee, WI
Cameron Madlock	23	F	6–9	215	Junior	Milwaukee, WI
Tony Nixon	25	G	6–4	200	Sophomore	South Holland, IL
Michael Patton	4	G	5–10	189	Senior	Boulder, CO
Nate Rucker	12	F/C	6–6	245	Freshman	Memphis, TN
Xavier Silas	13	G	6–5	198	Senior	Austin, TX
Tyler Storm	44	G	6–7	217	Junior	Geneseo, IL
Tim Toler	5	F	6–7	270	Junior	Indianapolis, IN

== Coaching staff ==
Name	Position	College	Graduating year
Ricardo Patton	Head coach	Belmont University	1980
Sundance Wicks	Assistant coach	Northern State University	2003
Will Smith	Assistant coach	University of Colorado at Boulder	2000
Todd Townsend	Assistant coach	Marquette University	2005
Kent Dernbach	Director of Basketball Operations	Carthage College	2004

== Schedule ==
2010–11 game log
November

Game	Date	Team	Score	High points	High rebounds	High assists	Location Attendance	Record
1	November 12	Northwestern	L 78–97	Xavier Silas- 25	Xavier Silas/ Nate Rucker- 6	Michael Patton- 4	Convocation Center, Dekalb, IL (4,001)	0–1 (0–0)
2	November 12	At Bradley	L 63–66	Xavier Silas- 22	Nate Rucker- 10	Michael Patton- 4	Carver Arena, Peoria, IL (7,646)	0–2 (0–0)
3	November 21	Cardianl Stritch	W 81–57	Xavier Silas- 34	Tim Toler/Lee Fisher- 7	Bryan Hall- 5	Convocation Center, Dekalb, IL (667)	1–2 (0–0)
4	November 24	At Maryland Eastern Shore	W 86–80	Xavier Silas- 34	Xavier Silas/ Lee Fisher – 6	Bryan Hall- 7	Hytche Center, Princess Anne, MD (612)	2–2 (0–0)
5	November 29	Boise St	L 80–52	Bryan Hall- 10	Tony Nixon- 5	Bryan Hall/ Michael Patton- 3	Convocation Center, Dekalb, Il (694)	2–3 (0–0)

December

Game	Date	Team	Score	High points	High rebounds	High assists	Location Attendance	Record
6	December 2	At Depaul	L 86–84	Xavier Silas- 34	Nate Rucker- 8	Bryan Hall- 5	Allstate Arena, Rosemont, IL (7,044)	2–4 (0–0)
7	December 14	Illinois-Chicago	W 80–78	Xavier Silas- 40	Lee Fisher- 9	Xavier Silas- 3	Convocation Center, Dekalb, IL (779)	3–4 (0–0)
8	December 18	At Temple	L 84–74	Xavier Silas- 27	Cameron Madlock- 10	Xavier Silas- 5	Liacouras Center, Philadelphia, PA (3,116)	3–5 (0–0)
9	December 22	At Southern Illinois	L 61–49	Xavier Silas- 11	Lee Fisher- 6	Tim Toler- 4	SIU Arena, Carbondale, IL (4,239)	3–6 (0–0)
10	December 27	At Missouri	L 97–69	Tim Toler- 13	Tim Toler/ Lee Fisher- 7	Michael Patton- 4	Mizzou Arena, Columbia, MO (10,776)	3–7 (0–0)
11	December 31	Utah Valley	W 86–76	Xavier Silas- 26	Tim Toler- 6	Tim Toler/ Xavier Silas- 3	Convocation Center, Dekalb, IL (853)	4–7 (0–0)

January

Game	Date	Team	Score	High points	High rebounds	High assists	Location Attendance	Record
12	January 3	At Iowa State	L 72–63	Xavier Silas- 18	Tim Toler- 10	Xavier Silas- 4	Hilton Coliseum, Ames, IA (11,469)	4–8 (0–0)
13	January 8	Ball State	L 75–70	Tim Toler- 22	Nate Rucker/ Jeremy Landers- 5	4 players with 3	Convocation Center, Dekalb, IL (1,041)	4–9 (0–1)
14	January 11	Eastern Michigan	W 71–69	Xavier Silas- 31	Tim Toler – 7	Jeremy Landers- 7	Convocation Center, Dekalb, IL (490)	5–9 (1–1)
15	January 15	Toledo					Convocation Center, Dekalb, IL	
16	January 20	At Central Michigan					McGuirk Arena, Mount Pleasant, MI	
17	January 22	At Western Michigan					University Arena, Kalamazoo, MI	
18	January 26	Akron					Convocation Center, Dekalb, IL	
19	January 29	At Buffalo					Alumni Arena, Buffalo, NY	

February

Game	Date	Team	Score	High points	High rebounds	High assists	Location Attendance	Record
20	February 2	Bowling Green					Convocation Center, Dekalb, IL	
21	February 5	At Ohio					Convocation Center, Athens, OH	
22	February 9	At Miami (OH)					Millett Hall, Oxford, OH	
23	February 12	Kent St)					Convocation Center, Dekalb, IL	
24	February 15	Western Michigan					Convocation Center, Dekalb, IL	
25	February 19	ESPNU BracketBusters, TBD					Convocation Center, Dekalb, IL	
26	February 23	Central Michigan					Convocation Center, Dekalb, IL	
27	February 26	At Toledo					Savage Arena, Toledo, OH	

March

Game	Date	Team	Score	High points	High rebounds	High assists	Location Attendance	Record
28	March 2	Eastern Michigan					Convocation Center, Dekalb, IL	
29	March 5	At Ball State					John E. Worthen Arena, Muncie, IN	
