= Geno Ford =

American basketball coach (born 1974)

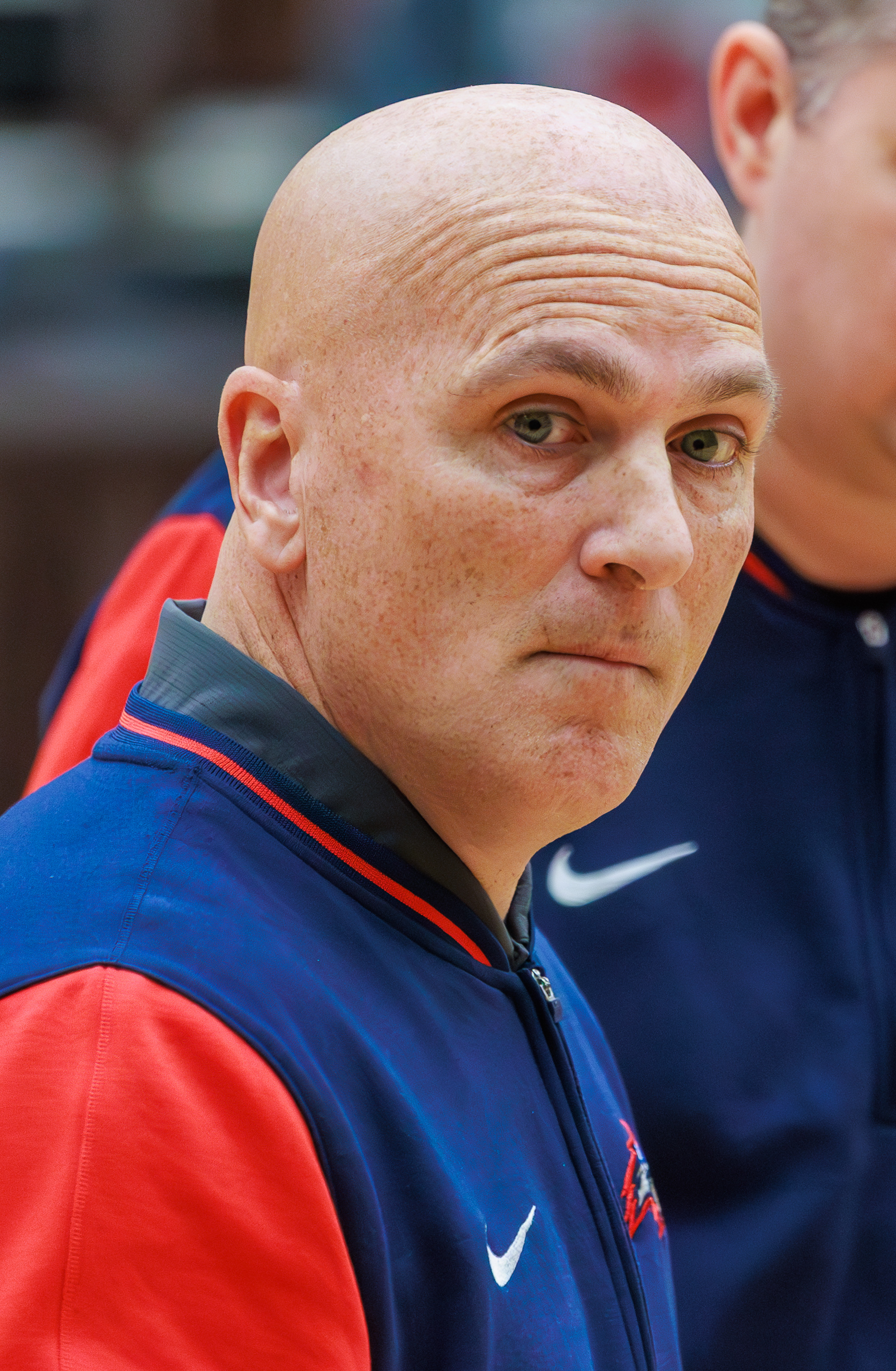
- Ford in 2024

Current position
- Title: Head coach
- Team: Stony Brook
- Conference: CAA
- Record: 105–118 (.471)
- Annual salary: $370,000

Biographical details
- Born: October 11, 1974 (age 52); Cambridge, Ohio, U.S.

Playing career
- 1993–1997: Ohio
- 1997–1998: Leicester Riders
- Position: Guard

Coaching career (HC unless noted)
- 1998–2001: Ohio (GA/assistant)
- 2001–2002: Shawnee State
- 2002–2005: Kent State (assistant)
- 2005–2007: Muskingum
- 2007–2008: Kent State (assistant)
- 2008–2011: Kent State
- 2011–2015: Bradley
- 2016–2019: Stony Brook (assistant)
- 2019–present: Stony Brook

Head coaching record
- Overall: 270–273 (.497)
- Tournaments: 3–2 (NIT); 0–1 (CBI); 2–2 (CIT)

Accomplishments and honors

Championships
- 2× MAC regular season (2010, 2011)

Awards
- 2× MAC Coach of the Year (2010, 2011); Ohio Mr. Basketball (1993)

Gene A. "Geno" Ford (born October 11, 1974) is an American college basketball coach and former college and professional basketball player. He is currently the men's head coach for the Stony Brook Seawolves, a position he has held since 2019. He was previously the head coach at Shawnee State University, Muskingum University (then Muskingum College), Kent State University (2008–2011) and Bradley University (2011–2015).

Ford was an assistant coach at Ohio University, Kent State and Stony Brook. He was promoted to head coach at Stony Brook after serving on Jeff Boals' staff for three seasons. Before turning to coaching, Ford was a prolific scorer in high school and in college at Ohio University. He graduated with the second-most points scored in Ohio high school basketball and the fourth-most points for the Ohio Bobcats.

== Playing career ==
=== High school ===
Ford was a high school standout at Cambridge High School in Cambridge, Ohio, playing for his father, Gene Ford. In 1993, after his senior season, he was named Ohio Mr. Basketball by the Associated Press. Ford scored 2,680 points in high school, second-most in history at the time of his graduation and currently the fourth-most behind Jon Diebler (3,208 points), Luke Kennard (2,977 points) and Jay Burson (2,958), but higher than LeBron James (2,646). Ford still holds the record for most free throws made in a season (288) and most career free throws (697) in Ohio high school boys' basketball. He was named to the All-Ohio Division II first team following both his junior and senior seasons and was also a two-time All-Eastern District Division II Player of the Year and two-time All-OVAC Class 4-A first team pick. In 2004, Ford was named to the Ohio Valley Athletic Conference Hall of Fame.

=== College ===
Ford played at Ohio University as a guard from 1993 to 1997, wearing No. 12. In four seasons with the Bobcats, Ford averaged 14.2 points per game on 41.4 percent shooting. He led the Bobcats in scoring in both his junior and senior seasons, averaging 18.9 points per game in 1995–96 and 18.7 in 1996–97. Ford was named to the All-MAC Second Team in 1996 and the All-MAC First Team in 1997.

Ford scored 1,752 points in college, graduating as the fourth-highest scorer of all time in Ohio Bobcats program history. He currently stands at sixth. Ford started 113 games, breaking the program record at the time (currently fifth), while he also still ranks in the top 10 for three-pointers made and free throws made. Ford currently holds the program record for most free throws made in a single game (19) on February 2, 1997, breaking the old record (17) which had stood for 42 years.

== Coaching career ==
Ford began his coaching career in 1998 as a graduate assistant at his alma mater Ohio University, and then promoted to a full-time assistant coaching position the next season, before becoming head coach at Shawnee State University of the NAIA in 2001. After one season at Shawnee State, he was hired as an assistant at Kent State under Jim Christian, where he coached for three seasons. In 2005, Ford was hired as head coach at Muskingum College, an NCAA Division III school, where he coached for two seasons before returning to Kent State as an assistant.

=== Kent State ===
Ford was promoted to head coach at Kent State in 2008 following Christian's departure to TCU, and coached the Golden Flashes for three seasons. At Kent State, Ford led the team to consecutive Mid-American Conference regular season titles in 2010 and 2011, winning MAC Coach of the Year both years. His teams at Kent State advanced to the postseason in each of his three seasons, playing in the 2009 CollegeInsider.com Postseason Tournament and the 2010 and 2011 National Invitation Tournaments. He finished with a record of 68–37 at Kent State, including 35–17 in MAC play.

After the 2009–10 season, Kent State reached a five-year extension with Ford that increased his salary to $300,000 per year, making him the highest-paid basketball coach in the MAC.

=== Bradley ===
Ford left Kent State one year into the extension to become the head coach at Bradley University, where his salary increased to $700,000.

Ford's teams at Bradley never finished above 7th in the Missouri Valley Conference (MVC), advancing to post-season play in the 2013 CollegeInsider.com Postseason Tournament. He was relieved of his duties at the conclusion of an injury-riddled 2014–15 season, where the Braves finished 9–24 overall and 3–15 in the MVC. Ford's record at Bradley was 46–86 overall and 19–53 in MVC play.

==== Contract breach lawsuit ====
Kent State sued Ford for breach of contract in 2011, claiming that Ford owed Kent State the sum of his salary over the four remaining years, worth $1.2 million, as a buyout agreed to in his contract. Kent State rejected Bradley's offer of a single $400,000 payment and won the lawsuit in 2013, forcing Ford to pay his former employer $1.2 million. In 2015, Kent State filed a new lawsuit against Ford and Bradley for tortious interference of contract, indemnification, third-party beneficiary contract, fraudulent transfer and civil conspiracy.

=== Stony Brook ===
Following a year off as a college basketball analyst for ESPN3, Ford was hired in 2016 as an assistant for Stony Brook under head coach and his former Ohio teammate Jeff Boals. On March 17, 2019, Ford was named the interim head coach of Stony Brook after Boals resigned to accept the head coaching job at Ohio University. Ford's interim tag was removed on March 26, when Stony Brook announced his promotion as the fourth head coach in the school's Division I era. Ford's contract is for five years, running through the 2023–24 season, with the ability to negotiate an extension after the 2021–22 season.

In Ford's first season, Stony Brook won 20 games for the eighth time in the last 11 seasons and finished in second place in the America East, their ninth top-2 finish over that time period. After defeating Albany in the America East quarterfinals, Stony Brook was upset 64–56 at home by Hartford in the semifinals to end their season at 20–13. Ford's second season at head coach saw Stony Brook finish 9–14, the program's worst record in 13 years.

Ford won his 200th game as a head coach on December 14, 2021 against Central Connecticut. In Ford's fourth season, Stony Brook moved from the America East to the Colonial Athletic Association, but the Seawolves suffered multiple season-ending injuries and finished 11–22 to tie for ninth. On February 7, 2024, Ford was extended for two more years through the 2025–26 season. In March 2024, as the seventh seed in the CAA tournament, Stony Brook advanced to face top-seed Charleston in the championship game by upsetting two-seed Drexel, 91–88 in double overtime in the quarterfinals and three-seed Hofstra, 63–58 in the semifinals. Stony Brook led Charleston 40–35 at the half and held Charleston scoreless in the final five minutes of regulation, scoring nine straight points to tie the game at 73 and go into overtime, where the Seawolves ultimately lost 82–79. Stony Brook was the first seven seed to advance to the CAA Finals since East Carolina in 1993.

== Head coaching record ==
Record table
| Season | Team | Overall | Conference | Standing | Postseason |
|---|---|---|---|---|---|
Shawnee State (American Mideast Conference) (2001–02)
| 2001–02 | Shawnee State | 22–10 | 13–5 | 3rd | |
| Shawnee State: | | 22–10 (.688) | 13–5 (.722) | | |
Muskingum (Ohio Athletic Conference) (2005–07)
| 2005–06 | Muskingum | 17–9 | 12–6 | 3rd | |
| 2006–07 | Muskingum | 12–13 | 6–12 | 8th | |
| Muskingum: | | 29–22 (.569) | 18–18 (.500) | | |
Kent State (Mid-American Conference) (2008–2011)
| 2008–09 | Kent State | 19–15 | 10–6 | T–3rd (East) | CIT First Round |
| 2009–10 | Kent State | 24–10 | 13–3 | 1st (East) | NIT Second Round |
| 2010–11 | Kent State | 25–12 | 12–4 | 1st (East) | NIT Quarterfinals |
| Kent State: | | 68–37 (.648) | 35–13 (.729) | | |
Bradley (Missouri Valley Conference) (2011–2015)
| 2011–12 | Bradley | 7–25 | 2–16 | 10th | |
| 2012–13 | Bradley | 18–17 | 7–11 | T–7th | CIT Quarterfinals |
| 2013–14 | Bradley | 12–20 | 7–11 | 7th | |
| 2014–15 | Bradley | 9–24 | 3–15 | 10th | |
| Bradley: | | 46–86 (.348) | 19–53 (.264) | | |
Stony Brook (America East) (2019–2022)
| 2018–19 | Stony Brook | 0–1* | | | CBI First Round* |
| 2019–20 | Stony Brook | 20–13 | 10–6 | 2nd | |
| 2020–21 | Stony Brook | 9–14 | 7–9 | 7th | |
| 2021–22 | Stony Brook | 18–13 | 10–8 | 3rd | |
Stony Brook (Colonial Athletic Association) (2022–2023)
| 2022–23 | Stony Brook | 11–22 | 6–12 | T–9th | |
Stony Brook (Coastal Athletic Association) (2023–present)
| 2023–24 | Stony Brook | 20–15 | 10–8 | T–6th | |
| 2024–25 | Stony Brook | 8–24 | 4–14 | 13th | |
| 2025–26 | Stony Brook | 17–15 | 9–9 | T–7th | |
| 2026–27 | Stony Brook | 2–2 | 0–0 | | |
| Stony Brook: | | 105–118 (.471) | 56–66 (.459) | | |
| Total: | | 270–273 (.497) | | | |
National champion Postseason invitational champion Conference regular season champion Conference regular season and conference tournament champion Division regular season champion Division regular season and conference tournament champion Conference tournament champion

*Ford was named interim head coach on March 17, 2019, after Boals took the head coaching job at Ohio. In addition, Ford holds a 5–5 postseason record as a Division I head coach (3–2 NIT, 0–1 CBI, 2–2 CIT).

== Personal life ==
Ford is married to his wife, Traci. He has two sons: Darin and David. His son, Darin, is the head coach at Nordonia High School in Ohio. Meanwhile, his younger son, David, served as director of player development under Ford at Stony Brook during the 2021–22 and 2022-2023 seasons. Ford's brother, Dustin, is the head coach at Akron and also played for Ohio from 1998 to 2001.
