= Porrino (surname) =

Porrino is a surname. Notable people with the surname include:

- Angel Porrino (born 1989), American television personality, actress, dancer, and showgirl
- Ennio Porrino (1910–1959), Italian composer and teacher
- Christopher Porrino (born 1967), American trial lawyer

== See also ==
- Porrini
