= Michael Porrini =

American basketball player and coach

Ohio Cardinals
- Title: Head coach
- League: NAPB

Personal information
- Born: March 2, 1989 (age 37)
- Listed height: 6 ft 2 in (1.88 m)
- Listed weight: 190 lb (86 kg)

Career information
- High school: Massillon Washington (Massillon, Ohio)
- College: Western Carolina (2007–2008); Gulf Coast State (2009–2010); Kent State (2010–2012)
- NBA draft: 2012: undrafted
- Playing career: 2012–2015
- Position: Shooting guard
- Coaching career: 2017–present

Career history

Playing
- 2012–2013: Gelişim Koleji S.K.
- 2013–2014: Aries Trikala BC
- 2014: BC Timba Timișoara

Coaching
- 2018–present: Ohio Cardinals

Career highlights
- MAC Defensive Player of the Year (2011)

Michael Anthony Porrini (born March 2, 1989) is a retired American professional basketball player. He is the head coach of the Ohio Cardinals of the North American Premier Basketball (NAPB).

== College career ==
Born in Massillon, Ohio, the 6 ft 2 in (1.88 m), 190-pound (86 kg) Porrini completed college at Kent State University. On March 8, 2011 Porrini was named MAC Defensive Player of the Year. Porrini was the fourth Kent State player to earn the award and marked the fifth Defensive Player of the Year award for Kent State (Demertic Shaw; 2001 and 2002; John Edwards, 2004; and Haminn Quaintance, 2008).

== Professional career ==
Porrini played professionally for four seasons. In 2014 he played for Timba Timișoara in the Romania-Liga Nationala.
