= Anderson Arena =

Sports arena at Bowling Green State University, Ohio

Coordinates: 41°22′37″N 83°38′11″W

- The House That Roars
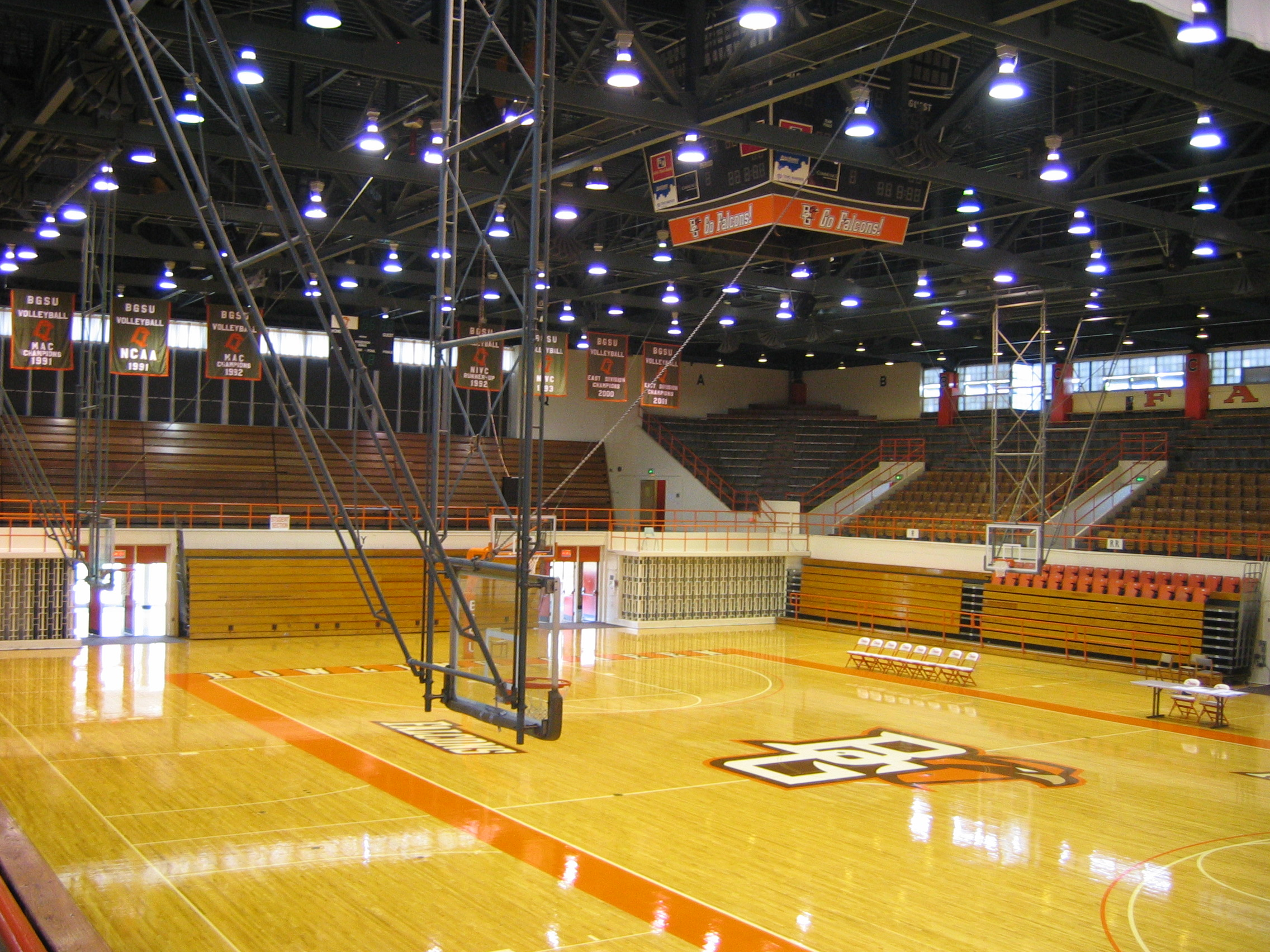
- Interactive map of Anderson Arena
- Location: Bowling Green, Ohio
- Owner: Bowling Green State University
- Operator: Bowling Green State University
- Capacity: 4,700 (basketball); 2,800 (gymnastics)

Construction
- Opened: December 1, 1960

Tenants
- Bowling Green Falcons (NCAA); Men's basketball (1960–2011); Women's basketball (1973–2011); Women's volleyball (1976–2010); Women's gymnastics (1975–present)

Anderson Arena is an indoor arena located in Memorial Hall on the campus of Bowling Green State University in Bowling Green, Ohio, and is currently home to the Bowling Green Falcons women's gymnastics team. The arena, which opened in 1960, served as the home arena for the Bowling Green men's and women's basketball teams and women's volleyball team until 2011. Following their season finales in 2010 and 2011, the teams moved into the newly built Stroh Center on the east side of campus. It originally had a seating capacity of 4,700 people for basketball games. For gymnastics meets, the capacity is 2,800.

== History ==
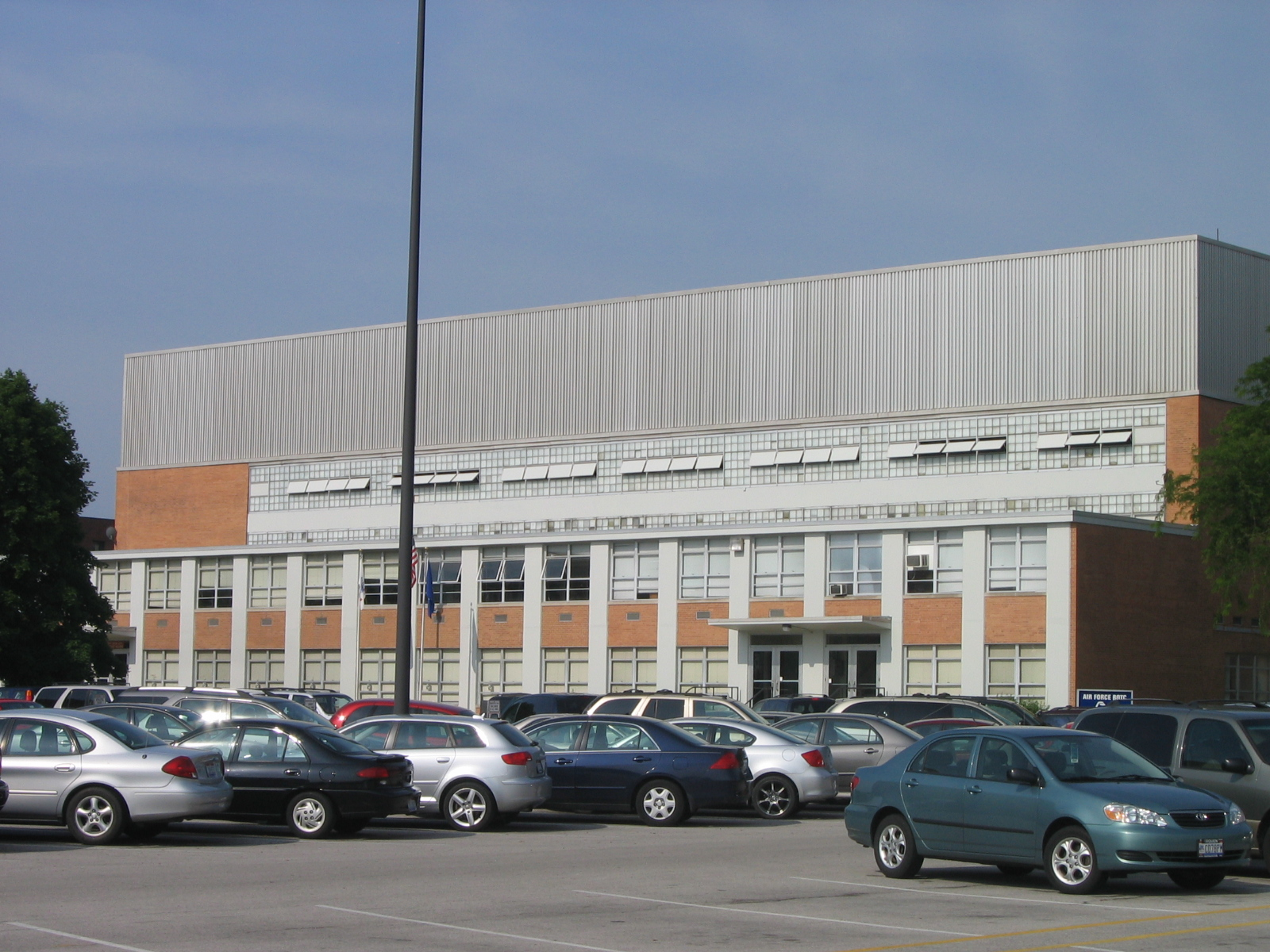
Exterior of Anderson Arena

=== Athletics ===
The arena is named after Naismith Basketball Hall of Famer Harold Anderson, who coached Bowling Green's men's basketball team from 1942 to 1963, leading the Falcons to three NCAA tournament appearances. Anderson Arena played host to the championship game of the 1983 Mid-American Conference men's basketball tournament, in which Bowling Green lost 59–56 to Ohio. The arena also hosted first round games for the NCAA Division I women's basketball tournament in 1989, 1993 and 1994. Anderson Arena was also notable for its final center-hung scoreboard, an All-American scoreboard which was originally at Allen County War Memorial Coliseum and was moved to Anderson in the late 1980s.

=== Events ===
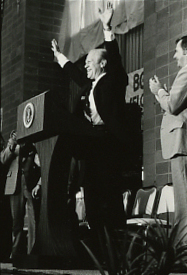
President Gerald Ford at Anderson Arena.

==== Concerts ====
Anderson Arena hosted a number of concerts.

===== 1970s =====
On October 12, 1974 Aerosmith performed at Anderson Arena. On May 4, 1975, Jefferson Starship performed to a sold out crowd.

In October 1975 Loggins and Messina performed at the arena, with Juice Newton & Silver Spur as the opening act.

In November 1975, Crosby & Nash performed at the arena. After the concert, Graham Nash needed to be taken to the Wood County Hospital for a respiratory issue.

The Doobie Brothers performed in Anderson Arena in April 1977, with Foreigner as a warm up band.

INXS performed at Anderson Arena on October 18, 1987, with UB40 as the opening act.

===== Centennial Concert =====
At the 2010 Centennial Concert Gavin DeGraw, Michelle Branch, and Red Wanting Blue performed at Anderson Arena, just before the Stroh Center supplanted Anderson Arena as the primary large event venue at the university.

==== Political events ====
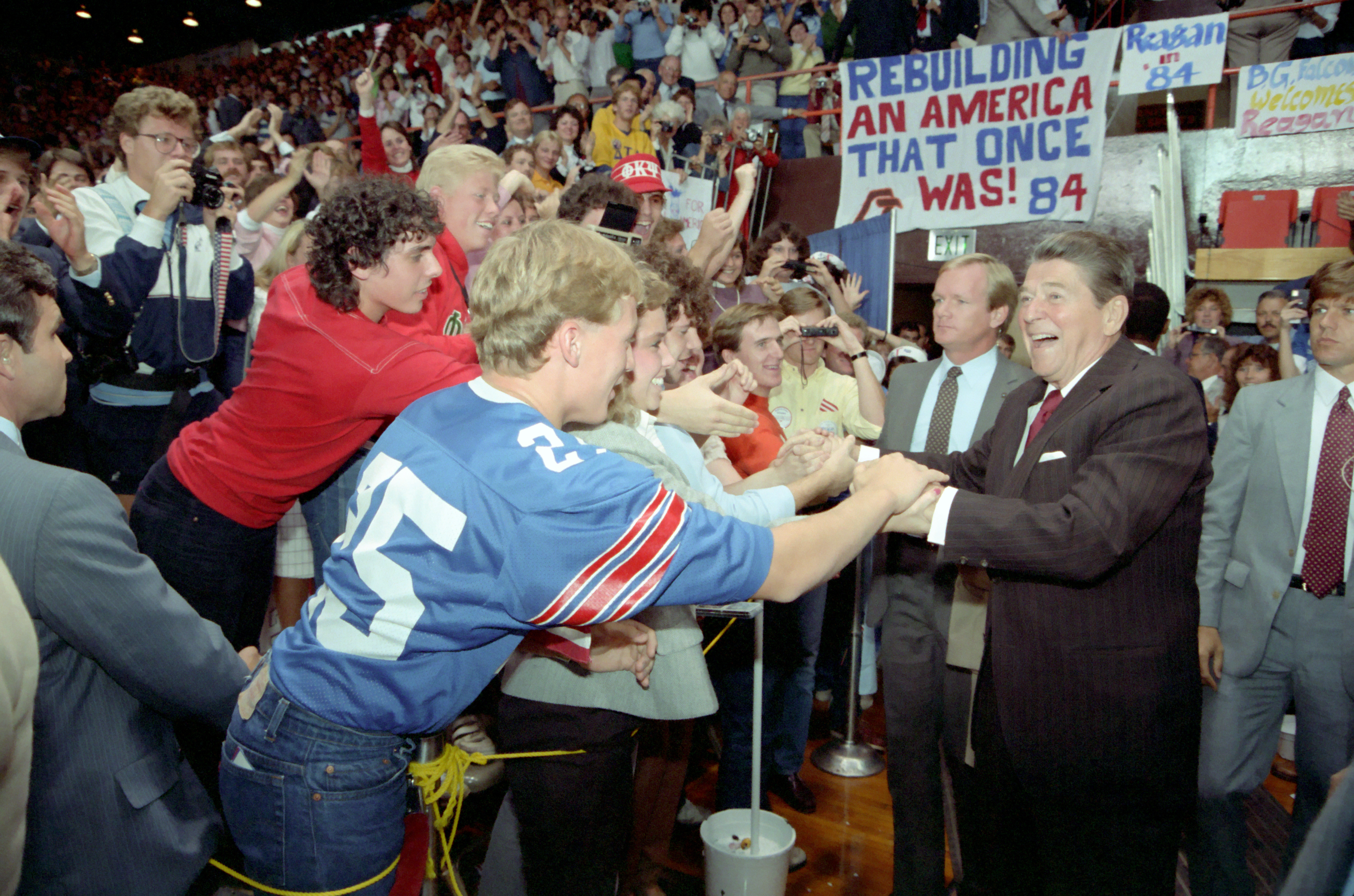
President Reagan campaigning at Anderson Arena in 1984

President Gerald Ford held a rally at the arena during the Greek Week opening on June 7, 1976. President Ronald Reagan held a rally to 4,000 attendees at the arena on September 26, 1984. Vice Presidential Candidate Sarah Palin and her then husband Todd Palin hosted a rally with about 5,500 attendees on October 29, 2008.

=== Replacement ===
By the dawn of the new millennium, problems arose with the arena. There were only two restrooms in the entire arena--a serious problem whenever attendance was anywhere near capacity. It lacked a number of modern conveniences, such as air conditioning. The concession facilities were well behind the times. Its acoustics and seating arrangement for concerts left much to be desired. Most severely, it was nowhere near compliance with the Americans with Disabilities Act.

The Bowling Green men's basketball team won their final regular season game at Anderson Arena, defeating Buffalo 73–63. During the halftime of the game a ceremony named Closing the Doors At the House That Roars was held that included former Bowling Green Falcons basketball stars, most notably Hall of Famer Nate Thurmond, university president Dr. Carol A. Cartwright and Ellen Anderson, the daughter of former coach and arena namesake Harold Anderson. The ceremony included a video tribute and a few speeches were given reminiscing the history of the arena.

The final commencement ceremonies at the Anderson Arena occurred on May 6–7, 2011 with 1,958 undergraduate and graduate students receiving their diplomas in four ceremonies over the two days.
