= 2010–11 Missouri Valley Conference men's basketball season =

- League: NCAA Division I
- Sport: Basketball
- Teams: 10
- TV partner(s): Fox Sports Midwest, ESPN, CBS Sports

Regular Season
- Champion: Missouri State
- Season MVP: Kyle Weems

Tournament
- Champions: Indiana State

Basketball seasons
- ← 09–10 11–12 →

2010–11 Missouri Valley Conference men's basketball standings
	Conf.				Overall
Team	W		L	PCT	W		L	PCT
Missouri State	15	–	3	.833	26	–	9	.743
Wichita State	14	–	4	.778	29	–	8	.784
Indiana State †	12	–	6	.667	20	–	14	.588
Northern Iowa	10	–	8	.556	20	–	14	.588
Creighton	10	–	8	.556	23	–	16	.590
Evansville	9	–	9	.500	16	–	16	.500
Drake	7	–	11	.389	13	–	18	.419
Southern Illinois	5	–	13	.278	13	–	19	.406
Illinois State	4	–	14	.222	12	–	19	.387
Bradley	4	–	14	.222	12	–	20	.375
† 2011 MVC tournament winner As of April 1, 2011; Rankings from AP Poll

The 2010–11 Missouri Valley Conference men's basketball season marks the 102nd season of Missouri Valley Conference basketball.

== Preseason ==
=== Missouri Valley preseason poll ===
Rank	Team	Votes (First Place)
1	Wichita State	382 (33)
2	Missouri State	313 (1)
3	Northern Iowa	289 (3)
4	Creighton	282
5	Bradley	264 (2)
6	Illinois State	165
7	Indiana State	136
8	Drake	121
9	Southern Illinois	120
10	Evansville	73

=== Missouri Valley preseason All-Conference team ===
- Kwadzo Ahelegbe (Northern Iowa)
- Kenny Lawson, Jr. (Creighton)
- Sam Maniscalco (Bradley)
- Toure' Murry (Wichita State)
- Kyle Weems (Missouri State)

== Awards & honors ==
=== Missouri Valley All-Conference teams ===
Award	Recipients
First Team	Kwadzo Ahelegbe (Northern Iowa); J.T. Durley (Wichita State); Doug McDermott (Creighton); Andrew Warren (Bradley); Kyle Weems (Missouri State)
Second Team	Will Creekmore (Missouri State); Colt Ryan (Evansville); Jermaine Mallet (Missouri State); Toure Murry (Wichita State); Antoine Young (Creighton)
Honorable Mention	Carlton Fay (Southern Illinois); Anthony James (Northern Iowa); Jake Odum (Indiana State); Rayvonte Rice (Drake); Carl Richard (Indiana State)
All-Newcomer Team	Gregory Echenique (Creighton); Doug McDermott (Creighton); Jake Odum (Indiana State); Rayvonte Rice (Drake); Mamadou Seck (Southern Illinois)
All-Freshman Team	Doug McDermott (Creighton); Jahenns Manigat (Creighton); Jake Odum (Indiana State); Rayvonte Rice (Drake); Nathan Scheer (Missouri State)
All-Defensive Team	Kwadzo Ahelegbe (Northern Iowa); Gregory Echenique (Creighton); Jermaine Mallett (Missouri State); Jake Odum (Indiana State); Lucas O'Rear (Northern Iowa)
All-Bench Team	Ben Smith (Wichita State); Ned Cox (Evansville); Jahenns Manigat (Creighton); Jordan Printy (Indiana State); Garrett Stutz (Wichita State)
Most Improved Team	Will Creekmore (Missouri State); David Kyles (Wichita State); Anthony James (Northern Iowa); Dyricus Simms-Edwards (Bradley); Antoine Young (Creighton)
Scholar-Athlete First Team	Kwadzo Ahelegbe (Northern Iowa); Will Creekmore (Missouri State); Dodie Dunson (Bradley); Graham Hatch (Wichita State); Jordan Printy (Indiana State)
Scholar-Athlete Second Team	Aaron Carter (Indiana State); Kaleb Korver (Creighton); Blake Mishler (Illinois State); Pieter von Tongeren (Evansville); Ryan Wedel (Drake)
Scholar-Athlete Honorable Mention	Jordan Clarke (Drake); Kerwin Dunham (Northern Iowa); Alex Rubin (Illinois State); Garrett Stutz (Wichita State); Charonn Woods (Bradley)
Larry Bird Player of the Year	Kyle Weems (Missouri State)
Newcomer of the Year	Doug McDermott (Creighton)
Freshman of the Year	Doug McDermott (Creighton)
Defensive MVP	Kwadzo Ahelegbe (Northern Iowa)
Sixth Man of the Year	Ben Smith (Wichita State)
Prairie Farms Scholar Athlete of the Year	Will Creekmore (Missouri State)
Most Improved Team Captain	Anthony James (Northern Iowa)
Coach of the Year	Cuonzo Martin (Missouri State)
