= 2010–11 Indiana State Sycamores men's basketball team =

American college basketball season

2010–11 Indiana State Sycamores men's basketball

Missouri Valley Conference tournament Champions

NCAA Tournament, Round of 64
- Conference: Missouri Valley Conference
- Record: 20–14 (12–6 The Valley)
- Head coach: Greg Lansing
- Assistant coaches: Lou Gudino; Deryl Cunningham; David Ragland; Doug White
- Home arena: Hulman Center

2010–11 Missouri Valley Conference men's basketball standings
	Conf.				Overall
Team	W		L	PCT	W		L	PCT
Missouri State	15	–	3	.833	26	–	9	.743
Wichita State	14	–	4	.778	29	–	8	.784
Indiana State †	12	–	6	.667	20	–	14	.588
Northern Iowa	10	–	8	.556	20	–	14	.588
Creighton	10	–	8	.556	23	–	16	.590
Evansville	9	–	9	.500	16	–	16	.500
Drake	7	–	11	.389	13	–	18	.419
Southern Illinois	5	–	13	.278	13	–	19	.406
Illinois State	4	–	14	.222	12	–	19	.387
Bradley	4	–	14	.222	12	–	20	.375
† 2011 MVC tournament winner As of April 1, 2011; Rankings from AP Poll

The 2010–11 Indiana State Sycamores men's basketball team represented Indiana State University during the 2010–11 NCAA Division I men's basketball season. The Sycamores, led by first year head coach Greg Lansing, played their home games at the Hulman Center and are members of the Missouri Valley Conference. They finished the season 20–14, 12–6 in Missouri Valley play and won the 2011 Missouri Valley Conference men's basketball tournament to earn an automatic bid in the 2011 NCAA Division I men's basketball tournament where they lost in the second round to Syracuse.

== Roster ==
Number	Name	Position	Height	Weight	Year	Hometown
0	Jake Kitchell	Forward	6–10	225	Freshman	Union Mills, Indiana
1	Koang Doluony	Forward	6–8	195	Sophomore	Omaha, Nebraska
2	Lucas Eitel	Guard	6–2	185	Freshman	Marshall, Illinois
3	Jake Kelly	Guard	6–6	185	Senior	Terre Haute, Indiana
10	Logan Eitel	Guard	6–2	190	Freshman	Marshall, Illinois
13	Jake Odum	Guard	6–4	170	Freshman	Terre Haute, Indiana
15	Carl Richard	Guard/Forward	6–5	215	Junior	Chicago, Illinois
20	Dwayne Lathan	Guard	6–3	205	Junior	Chatham, Louisiana
21	Isiah Martin	Forward/Center	6–8	220	Senior	Chicago, Illinois
24	Jordan Printy	Guard	6–4	185	Junior	Marion, Iowa
25	Steve McWhorter	Guard	6–2	185	Freshman	Racine, Wisconsin
31	RJ Mahurin	Forward	6–8	210	Freshman	Rockville, Indiana
32	Aaron Carter	Guard	6–4	195	Senior	Cannelton, Indiana
34	Myles Walker	Center	6–8	250	Junior	San Antonio, Texas

== Schedule ==
Date time, TV	Rank^{#}	Opponent^{#}	Result	Record	Site (attendance) city, state
Exhibition
11/02/2010*; 7:00 pm		Rose–Hulman	W 83–44	–	Hulman Center; Terre Haute, IN
11/06/2010*; 12:00 pm		Wabash	W 71–60	–	Hulman Center; Terre Haute, IN
Regular season
11/12/2010*; 6:00 pm		vs. Texas–Pan American; Loyola Classic	W 69–46	1–0	Joseph J. Gentile Center; Chicago, IL
11/13/2010*; 8:30 pm		at Loyola Chicago; Loyola Classic	L 74–88	1–1	Joseph J. Gentile Center (2,023); Chicago, IL
11/14/2010*; 4:00 pm		vs. Eastern Kentucky; Loyola Classic	L 59–64 ^{OT}	1–2	Joseph J. Gentile Center; Chicago, IL
11/17/2010*; 7:00 pm		at Ball State	L 60–75	1–3	John E. Worthen Arena (3,819); Muncie, IN
11/20/2010*; 8:00 pm, FCS		at Oral Roberts	W 74–69	2–3	Mabee Center (2,893); Tulsa, OK
11/27/2010*; 1:00 pm		Buffalo	L 58–64	3–3	Hulman Center (3,927); Terre Haute, IN
11/30/2010*; 7:30 pm		at No. 25 Notre Dame	L 72–81	3–4	Edmund P. Joyce Center (7,080); South Bend, IN
12/04/2010*; 7:00 pm, The Mtn.		at Wyoming; MWC – MVC Challenge	L 51–81	3–5	Arena-Auditorium (7,008); Laramie, WY
12/08/2010*; 8:00 pm, WTWO		DePaul	W 73–51	4–5	Hulman Center (6,879); Terre Haute, IN
12/12/2010*; 3:30 pm		Oakland City	W 86–42	5–5	Hulman Center (6,056); Terre Haute, IN
12/18/2010*; 4:00 pm, BTN		vs. No. 17 Purdue; Boilermaker Blockbuster	L 52–65	5–6	Conseco Fieldhouse (7,666); Indianapolis, IN
12/29/2010; 7:00 pm		Bradley	W 80–66	6–6 (1–0)	Hulman Center (4,037); Terre Haute, IN
01/01/2011; 7:00 pm, MVCTV		at Evansville	L 59–64	6–7 (1–1)	Roberts Municipal Stadium (7,612); Evansville, IN
01/04/2011; 7:00 pm		Illinois State	W 72–57	7–7 (2–1)	Hulman Center (4,275); Terre Haute, IN
01/07/2011; 7:00 pm, WTWO		Northern Iowa	W 70–45	8–7 (3–1)	Hulman Center (5,164); Terre Haute, IN
01/09/2011; 6:00 pm		at Drake	W 62–57	9–7 (4–1)	Knapp Center (3,432); Des Moines, IA
01/12/2011; 8:00 pm		at Bradley	W 59–53	10–7 (5–1)	Carver Arena (7,567); Peoria, IL
01/16/2011; 1:00 pm, MVCTV		Creighton	W 61–59	11–7 (6–1)	Hulman Center (6,080); Terre Haute, IN
01/19/2011; 6:00 pm, WTWO		Missouri State	W 70–69	12-7 (7–1)	Hulman Center (7,230); Terre Haute, IN
01/22/2011; 8:00 pm		at Wichita State	L 83–93 ^{3OT}	11–9 (6–3)	Charles Koch Arena (10,506); Wichita, KS
01/26/2011; 7:00 pm, WTWO		Evansville	L 63–66	11–10 (6–4)	Hulman Center (5,579); Terre Haute, IN
01/29/2011; 3:00 pm		at Creighton	L 69–83	11–11 (6–5)	Qwest Center Omaha (16,044); Omaha, NE
02/01/2011; 7:00 pm		Wichita State	L 54–70	11–12 (6–6)	Hulman Center (3,463); Terre Haute, IN
02/05/2011; 3:00 pm		at Missouri State	L 66–73	12–12 (7–6)	JQH Arena (8,201); Springfield, MO
02/09/2011; 8:00 pm		at Illinois State	W 56–46	13–12 (8–6)	Redbird Arena (4,039); Normal, IL
02/12/2011; 1:00 pm, WFXW		Drake	W 75–63	14–12 (9–6)	Hulman Center (10,200); Terre Haute, IN
02/16/2011; 8:00 pm		at Southern Illinois	W 77–72	15–12 (10–6)	SIU Arena (3,267); Carbondale, IL
02/19/2011*; 1:00 pm		Morehead State; ESPN BracketBusters	L 65–71	15–13	Hulman Center (5,370); Terre Haute, IN
02/22/2011; 8:00 pm		at Northern Iowa	W 76–74	16–13 (11–6)	McLeod Center (4,419); Cedar Falls, IA
02/26/2011; 1:00 pm, WTWO		Southern Illinois	W 75–60	17–13 (12–6)	Hulman Center (5,112); Terre Haute, IN
Missouri Valley tournament
03/04/2011; 9:35 pm, MVCTV	(3)	vs. (6) Evansville; MVC Quarterfinals	W 52–50	18–13	Scottrade Center (9,813); St. Louis, MO
03/05/2011; 5:05 pm, MVCTV	(3)	vs. (2) Wichita State; MVC Semifinals	W 61–54	19–13	Scottrade Center (13,533); St. Louis, MO
03/06/2011; 2:05 pm, CBS	(3)	vs. (1) Missouri State; MVC Championship Game	W 60–56	20–13	Scottrade Center (10,171); St. Louis, MO
NCAA tournament
03/18/2011*; 9:57 pm, truTV	(14 E)	vs. (3 E) No. 12 Syracuse; NCAA Second Round	L 60–77	20–14	Quicken Loans Arena (20,164); Cleveland, OH
*Non-conference game. ^{#}Rankings from AP Poll. (#) Tournament seedings in parentheses. E=NCAA East Regional. All times are in Eastern Time.
