= 2010–11 Drake Bulldogs men's basketball team =

American college basketball season

2010–11 Drake Bulldogs men's basketball
- Conference: Missouri Valley Conference
- NCAA Division I
- Record: 13–18 (7–11 MVC)
- Head coach: Mark Phelps
- Assistant coaches: Mike Gibson; Kareem Richardson; Justin Ohl
- Home arena: Knapp Center

2010–11 Missouri Valley Conference men's basketball standings
	Conf.				Overall
Team	W		L	PCT	W		L	PCT
Missouri State	15	–	3	.833	26	–	9	.743
Wichita State	14	–	4	.778	29	–	8	.784
Indiana State †	12	–	6	.667	20	–	14	.588
Northern Iowa	10	–	8	.556	20	–	14	.588
Creighton	10	–	8	.556	23	–	16	.590
Evansville	9	–	9	.500	16	–	16	.500
Drake	7	–	11	.389	13	–	18	.419
Southern Illinois	5	–	13	.278	13	–	19	.406
Illinois State	4	–	14	.222	12	–	19	.387
Bradley	4	–	14	.222	12	–	20	.375
† 2011 MVC tournament winner As of April 1, 2011; Rankings from AP Poll

The 2010–11 Drake Bulldogs men's basketball team represented Drake University during the 2010-11 NCAA Division I men's basketball season. The team, which plays in the Missouri Valley Conference (MVC), was led by third-year head coach Mark Phelps and played their home games at the Knapp Center. The Bulldogs finished the season 13–18, 7–11 in Missouri Valley play. They lost in the first round of the 2011 Missouri Valley Conference men's basketball tournament to Bradley.

== Preseason ==
Sean Duff and Sean Jones are no longer on the team. Craig Stanley, Josh Young, Bill Eaddy, and Adam Templeton all graduated.

== Roster ==
Note: Flags indicate national team eligibility at FIBA sanctioned events. Players may hold other non-FIBA nationality not displayed.

No.		Position	Player
1	(United States)	F	Jordan Clarke
2	(United States)	F	Aaron Hawley
3	(Canada)	G	Kurt Alexander
10	(United States)	G	Ryan Wedel
11	(United States)	G	Karl Madison
13	(Luxembourg)	G	Frank Wiseler
14	(United States)	F	Jeremy Jeffers
21	(United States)	F	Corey Parker

No.		Position	Player
22	(United States)	F	Kraidon Woods
23	(United States)	G	Brennen Newton
24	(United States)	G	Rayvonte Rice
25	(United States)	G	David Smith
32	(United States)	F	Greg Whitaker
34	(United States)	F	Ben Simons
40	(United States)	F	Reece Uhlenhopp
45	(United States)	C	Seth VanDeest

== Schedule ==
Date time, TV	Rank^{#}	Opponent^{#}	Result	Record	Site (attendance) city, state
Exhibition
11/6/10*; 7:05 p.m., Mediacom		Wisconsin–Parkside	W 82–46	0–0	Knapp Center (3,085); Des Moines, IA
Regular season
11/13/10*; 7:05 p.m., Mediacom		Texas Southern	W 60–46	1–0	Knapp Center (3,661); Des Moines, IA
11/17/10*; 7:07 p.m., Mediacom		at Iowa State; Big Four Series	L 43–91	1–1	Hilton Coliseum (12,988); Ames, IA
11/23/10*; 10:30 p.m., Fox College Sports		vs. Southern Utah; Great Alaska Shootout	W 78–59	2–1	Sullivan Arena (8,700); Anchorage, AK
11/26/10*; 8:30 p.m., Fox College Sports		vs. St. John's; Great Alaska Shootout	L 39–82	2–2	Sullivan Arena (8,700); Anchorage, AK
11/27/10*; 8:30 p.m., Fox College Sports		vs. Weber State; Great Alaska Shootout	L 81–82	2–3	Sullivan Arena (8,700); Anchorage, AK
12/1/10*; 7:00 p.m., Mountain West Sports Network		at Colorado State; MWC/MVC Challenge	L 67–78	2–4	Moby Arena (2,215); Fort Collins, CO
12/8/10*; 7:00 p.m., Eagles TV Network or MVC TV		at Eastern Michigan	W 58–54	3–4	Convocation Center (6,930); Ypsilanti, MI
12/12/10*; 2:05 p.m., Mediacom		Boise State	W 72–69	4–4	Knapp Center (3,467); Des Moines, IA
12/18/10*; 7:07 p.m., Mediacom		Iowa; Big Four Series	L 52–59	4–5	Knapp Center (6,671); Des Moines, IA
12/21/10*; 7:05 p.m., Mediacom		Dartmouth	L 59–67	4–6	Knapp Center (3,358); Des Moines, IA
12/23/10*; 2:05 p.m., Mediacom		Chicago State	W 102–51	5–6	Knapp Center (3,802); Des Moines, IA
12/29/10; 7:05 p.m., Mediacom		Southern Illinois	W 69–55	6–6 (1–0)	Knapp Center (3,619); Des Moines, IA
1/1/11; 7:05 p.m., CBS College Sports		at Creighton; I-80 Rivalry	L 57–73	6–7 (1–1)	Qwest Center Omaha (15,271); Omaha, NE
1/4/11; 7:05 p.m., Kansas 22 or MVC TV		at Wichita State	L 63–82	6–8 (1–2)	Charles Koch Arena (10,506); Wichita, KS
1/7/11; 7:05 p.m., Fox Sports Net		Bradley	W 64–58	7–8 (2–2)	Knapp Center (3,827); Des Moines, IA
1/9/11; 5:05 p.m., Mediacom		Indiana State	L 57–62	7–9 (2–3)	Knapp Center (3,432); Des Moines, IA
1/12/11; 7:05 p.m., Fox College Sports		at Evansville	L 51–67	7–10 (2–4)	Roberts Stadium (3,118); Evansville, IN
1/15/11; 7:05 p.m., Mediacom		Wichita State	L 54–68	7–11 (2–5)	Knapp Center (3,872); Des Moines, IA
1/18/11; 7:05 p.m., Mediacom		Illinois State	W 76–68	8–11 (3–5)	Knapp Center (3,748); Des Moines, IA
1/22/11; 7:00 p.m., Mediacom		at Northern Iowa; DU-UNI Rivalry & Big Four Series	L 49–69	8–12 (3–6)	McLeod Center (6,971); Cedar Falls, IA
1/25/11; 7:05 p.m., Mediacom		Missouri State	L 70–73	8–13 (3–7)	Knapp Center (4,197); Des Moines, IA
1/30/11; 2:05 p.m., Comcast SportsNet		at Illinois State	L 75–77 ^{OT}	8–14 (3–8)	Redbird Arena (5,016); Normal, IL
2/2/11; 7:05 p.m., Fox Sports Net		at Southern Illinois	W 65–44	9–14 (4–8)	SIU Arena (3,205); Carbondale, IL
2/5/11; 12:05 p.m., ESPNU		Northern Iowa; DU-UNI Rivalry & Big Four Series	W 72–69	10–14 (5–8)	Knapp Center (6,352); Des Moines, IA
2/8/11; 7:05 p.m., Mediacom		Creighton; I-80 Rivalry	W 67–64	11–14 (6–8)	Knapp Center (4,552); Des Moines, IA
2/12/11; 12:05 p.m., WTWO-TV or MVC TV		at Indiana State	L 63–75	11–15 (6–9)	Hulman Center (10,200); Terre Haute, IN
2/15/11; 7:05 p.m., Mediacom		at Missouri State	L 51–60	11–16 (6–10)	JQH Arena (7,211); Springfield, MO
2/19/11*; 7:05 p.m., ESPN3		Detroit; ESPN BracketBusters	W 84–76	12–16	Knapp Center (4,570); Des Moines, IA
2/23/11; 7:05 p.m., Mediacom		Evansville	W 87–69	13–16 (7–10)	Knapp Center (4,328); Des Moines, IA
2/26/11; 7:05 p.m., WTVP or MVC-TV		at Bradley	L 64–90	13–17 (7–11)	Carver Arena (9,720); Peoria, IL
Missouri Valley Conference tournament
3/3/11; 8:35 p.m., Fox Sports Net	(7)	vs. (10) Bradley; First Round	L 48–63	13–18	Scottrade Center; Saint Louis, MO
*Non-conference game. ^{#}Rankings from AP Poll. (#) Tournament seedings in parentheses. All times are in Central Standard Time.
