= 2010–11 Missouri State Bears basketball team =

American college basketball season

2010–11 Missouri State Bears men's basketball

Missouri Valley Conference Regular Season Champions

NIT, Second Round
- Conference: Missouri Valley Conference
- Record: 26–9 (15–3 The Valley)
- Head coach: Cuonzo Martin
- Assistant coaches: Jon Harris; Steve Woodberry; Kent Williams
- Home arena: JQH Arena

2010–11 Missouri Valley Conference men's basketball standings
	Conf.				Overall
Team	W		L	PCT	W		L	PCT
Missouri State	15	–	3	.833	26	–	9	.743
Wichita State	14	–	4	.778	29	–	8	.784
Indiana State †	12	–	6	.667	20	–	14	.588
Northern Iowa	10	–	8	.556	20	–	14	.588
Creighton	10	–	8	.556	23	–	16	.590
Evansville	9	–	9	.500	16	–	16	.500
Drake	7	–	11	.389	13	–	18	.419
Southern Illinois	5	–	13	.278	13	–	19	.406
Illinois State	4	–	14	.222	12	–	19	.387
Bradley	4	–	14	.222	12	–	20	.375
† 2011 MVC tournament winner As of April 1, 2011; Rankings from AP Poll

The 2010–11 Missouri State Bears basketball team represented Missouri State University during the 2010–11 NCAA Division I men's basketball season. The Bears, led by third year head coach Cuonzo Martin, played their home games at JQH Arena and are members of the Missouri Valley Conference. They finished the season 26–9, 15–3 in Missouri Valley play to win the regular season conference championship. They lost in the championship game of the 2011 Missouri Valley Conference men's basketball tournament. As a regular season conference champion who failed to win their conference tournament, they received an automatic bid in the 2011 National Invitation Tournament where they defeated Murray State in the first round before falling in the second round to Miami (FL).

== Roster ==
Number	Name	Position	Height	Weight	Year	Hometown
1	Keith Pickens	Guard/Forward	6–4	187	Sophomore	St. Louis, Missouri
2	Nafis Ricks	Guard	6–2	189	Senior	Philadelphia, Pennsylvania
3	Aaron Cooper	Guard	5–10	167	Freshman	Little Rock, Arkansas
10	Adam Leonard	Guard	6–1	198	Senior	Lee's Summit, Missouri
15	Jermaine Mallett	Guard	6–3	217	Senior	Jackson, Mississippi
21	Caleb Petterson	Center	6–11	260	Junior	Ames, Oklahoma
24	Keith Dupont	Guard	5–9	166	Sophomore	Waynesville, Missouri
30	Nathan Scheer	Forward	6–4	191	Freshman	Washington, Missouri
31	Nick Valla	Guard	6–2	186	Freshman	Chicago, Illinois
33	Corey Copeland	Guard	6–4	173	Freshman	Fort Smith, Arkansas
34	Kyle Weems	Forward	6–6	232	Junior	Topeka, Kansas
44	Will Creekmore	Forward/Center	6–9	248	Senior	Tulsa, Oklahoma
50	Isaiah Rhine	Center	6–10	241	Junior	Versailles, Missouri

== Schedule ==
Date time, TV	Rank^{#}	Opponent^{#}	Result	Record	Site (attendance) city, state
Exhibition Season
10/31/10*; 1:00 pm		Upper Iowa	W 73–46	—	JQH Arena (4,466); Springfield, MO
11/6/10*; 4:00 pm		Arkansas–Fort Smith	W 86–61		JQH Arena (4,535); Springfield, MO
Regular Season
11/12/10*; 8:35 pm		Oral Roberts	W 78–61	1–0	JQH Arena (7,010); Springfield, MO
11/16/10*; 6:00 pm		vs. Arkansas State; NIT Season Tip-Off	W 80–71	2–0	Thompson–Boling Arena (16,783); Knoxville, TN
11/17/10*; 6:00 pm, Ozarks CW		at No. 23 Tennessee; NIT Season Tip-Off	L 56–60	2–1	Thompson–Boling Arena (16,001); Knoxville, TN
11/19/10*; 7:00 pm, KY3		at Tulsa	L 50–62	2–2	Reynolds Center (5,268); Tulsa, OK
11/22/10*; 7:00 pm		Pepperdine; NIT Season Tip-Off	W 80–60	3–2	JQH Arena (5,524); Springfield, MO
11/23/10*; 7:00 pm		Pacific; NIT Season Tip-Off	W 60–49	4–2	JQH Arena (5,092); Springfield, MO
12/1/10*; 7:00 pm		Arkansas–Little Rock	W 80–46	5–2	JQH Arena (6,932); Springfield, MO
12/4/10*; 7:00 pm		Central Arkansas	W 101–61	6–2	JQH Arena (7,008); Springfield, MO
12/11/10*; 7:00 pm, KY3		at Oklahoma State	L 70–84	6–3	Gallagher-Iba Arena (10,401); Stillwater, OK
12/18/10*; 7:00 pm		Saint Louis	W 81–65	7–3	JQH Arena (7,896); Springfield, MO
12/22/2010*; 7:00 pm		Arkansas State	W 77–70	8–3	JQH Arena (6,015); Springfield, MO
12/29/10; 7:00 pm, FS Midwest		at Northern Iowa	W 58–57	9–3 (1–0)	McLeod Center (4,890); Cedar Falls, IA
1/1/11; 7:00 pm		Illinois State	W 82–71	10–3 (2–0)	JQH Arena (7,612); Springfield, MO
1/4/11; 7:00 pm, FS Midwest		at Creighton	W 67–55	11–3 (3–0)	Qwest Center Omaha (14,920); Omaha, NE
1/7/11; 7:00 pm		Evansville	W 65–50	12–3 (4–0)	JQH Arena (9,134); Springfield, MO
1/9/11; 7:35 pm, ESPNU		at Wichita State	W 59–56	13–3 (5–0)	Charles Koch Arena (10,506); Wichita, KS
1/12/11; 7:00 pm		Southern Illinois	W 64–51	14–3 (6–0)	JQH Arena (8,112); Springfield, MO
1/16/11; 7:00 pm, ESPNU		at Bradley	W 78–67	15–3 (7–0)	Carver Arena (8,551); Peoria, IL
1/19/11; 6:00 pm, Ozarks CW		at Indiana State	L 69–70	15–4 (7–1)	Hulman Center (7,230); Terre Haute, IN
1/22/11; 4:00 pm, ESPN2		Creighton	W 67–66	16–4 (8–1)	JQH Arena (10,655); Springfield, MO
1/25/11; 7:00 pm, Ozarks CW		at Drake	W 73–70	17–4 (9–1)	The Knapp Center (4,197); Des Moines, IA
1/30/11; 7:00 pm, ESPNU		Northern Iowa	L 59–60	17–5 (9–2)	JQH Arena (9,901); Springfield, MO
2/2/11; 7:00 pm, Ozarks CW		at Evansville	L 65–77	17–6 (9–3)	Roberts Municipal Stadium (3,463); Evansville, IN
2/5/11; 2:00 pm		Indiana State	W 73–66	18–6 (10–3)	JQH Arena (8,201); Springfield, MO
2/9/11; 7:00 pm, FS Midwest		Bradley	W 77–69	19–6 (11–3)	JQH Arena (6,649); Springfield, MO
2/12/11; 7:00 pm, Ozarks CW		at Illinois State	W 68–59	20–6 (12–3)	Redbird Arena (5,204); Normal, IL
2/15/11; 7:00 pm		Drake	W 60–51	21–6 (13–3)	JQH Arena (7,211); Springfield, MO
2/19/11*; 4:00 pm, ESPN2		at Valparaiso; ESPN BracketBusters	L 67–80	21–7	Athletics–Recreation Center (5,328); Valparaiso, IN
2/23/11; 7:00 pm, KY3		at Southern Illinois	W 76–58	22–7 (14–3)	SIU Arena (3,687); Carbondale, IL
2/26/11; 12:00 pm, ESPN2		Wichita State	W 69–64	23–7 (15–3)	JQH Arena (11,077); Springfield, MO
Conference Tournament
3/4/11; 12:05 pm, MVC TV	(1)	vs. (8) Southern Illinois; Quarterfinal	W 58–56	24–7	Scottrade Center (10,608); St. Louis, MO
3/5/11; 1:35 pm, MVC TV	(1)	vs. (5) Creighton; Semifinal	W 60–50	25–7	Scottrade Center (13,533); St. Louis, MO
3/6/11; 1:05 pm, CBS	(1)	vs. (3) Indiana State; Final	L 56–60	25–8	Scottrade Center (10,171); St. Louis, MO
National Invitation Tournament
3/15/11*; 7:00 pm, ESPN3	(3 A)	(6 A) Murray State; First Round	W 89–76	26–8	JQH Arena (5,089); Springfield, MO
3/21/11*; 6:00 pm, ESPN	(3 A)	at (2 A) Miami (Florida); Second Round	L 72–81	26–9	BankUnited Center (1,623); Coral Gables, FL
*Non-conference game. ^{#}Rankings from AP Poll. (#) Tournament seedings in parentheses. A=NIT Alabama bracket. All times are in Central Time.
