= 2010–11 Northern Iowa Panthers men's basketball team =

American college basketball season

2010–11 Northern Iowa Panthers men's basketball

Las Vegas Classic Champions

CIT, Quarterfinals
- Conference: Missouri Valley Conference
- Record: 20–14 (10–8 The Valley)
- Head coach: Ben Jacobson
- Assistant coaches: Kyle Green; P.J. Hogan; Ben Johnson
- Home arena: McLeod Center

2010–11 Missouri Valley Conference men's basketball standings
	Conf.				Overall
Team	W		L	PCT	W		L	PCT
Missouri State	15	–	3	.833	26	–	9	.743
Wichita State	14	–	4	.778	29	–	8	.784
Indiana State †	12	–	6	.667	20	–	14	.588
Northern Iowa	10	–	8	.556	20	–	14	.588
Creighton	10	–	8	.556	23	–	16	.590
Evansville	9	–	9	.500	16	–	16	.500
Drake	7	–	11	.389	13	–	18	.419
Southern Illinois	5	–	13	.278	13	–	19	.406
Illinois State	4	–	14	.222	12	–	19	.387
Bradley	4	–	14	.222	12	–	20	.375
† 2011 MVC tournament winner As of April 1, 2011; Rankings from AP Poll

The 2010–11 Northern Iowa Panthers men's basketball team represented the University of Northern Iowa during the 2010–11 NCAA Division I men's basketball season. The Panthers, led by fifth year head coach Ben Jacobson, played their home games at the McLeod Center and are members of the Missouri Valley Conference.

A Sweet Sixteen finisher in the 2010 NCAA tournament, UNI purchased the court on which the Panthers played in their season-ending tournament loss to the Michigan State Spartans. The floor has been installed at the McLeod Center.

The Panthers finished the season 20–14, 10–8 in Missouri Valley play and lost in the quarterfinals of the 2011 Missouri Valley Conference men's basketball tournament. They were invited to the 2011 CollegeInsider.com Tournament where they defeated Rider in the first round and received a second round bye before falling to SMU in the quarterfinals.

== Roster ==
Number	Name	Position	Height	Weight	Year	Hometown
3	Jarod Syndergaard	Guard	6–1	180	Freshman	Sutherland, Iowa
4	Chip Rank	Forward	6–6	222	Freshman	Cedarburg, Wisconsin
11	Kwadzo Ahelegbe	Guard	6–2	213	Senior	Oakdale, Minnesota
13	Johnny Moran	Guard	6–1	190	Junior	Algonquin, Illinois
14	Nate Buss	Forward	6–8	195	Freshman	Charles City, Iowa
20	Jake Koch	Forward	6–9	255	Sophomore	Ashwaubenon, Wisconsin
21	Matt Morrison	Guard	6–0	175	Freshman	Solon, Iowa
22	Kerwin Dunham	Guard	6–6	200	Senior	Bondurant, Iowa
23	Marc Sonnen	Guard	6–3	185	Sophomore	St. Paul, Minnesota
24	Max Martino	Guard	6–5	195	Freshman	Cedar Rapids, Iowa
32	Lucas O'Rear	Forward	6–6	260	Senior	Du Bois, Illinois
33	Austin Pehl	Center	6–10	245	Sophomore	Cedar Falls, Iowa
34	Tyler Lange	Forward	6–6	220	Freshman	Sac City, Iowa
35	James Humpal	Forward	6–5	220	Freshman	Waterloo, Iowa
52	Anthony James	Guard	6–0	175	Sophomore	St. Louis, Missouri

== Schedule ==
Date time, TV	Rank^{#}	Opponent^{#}	Result	Record	Site (attendance) city, state
Exhibition
11/02/2010*; 7:00 pm		Wartburg	W 67–46	—	McLeod Center (3,660); Cedar Falls, IA
11/06/2010*; 12:00 pm		Mary	W 57–38	—	McLeod Center (3,482); Cedar Falls, IA
Regular season
11/12/2010*; 7:00 pm, ESPN3		at No. 10 Syracuse	L 46–68	0–1	Carrier Dome (22,198); Syracuse, NY
11/16/2010*; 7:00 pm, KWWL		Coe	W 84–45	1–1	McLeod Center (3,889); Cedar Falls, IA
11/20/2010*; 7:00 pm		at Milwaukee	L 63–65	1–2	US Cellular Arena (3,752); Milwaukee, WI
11/27/2010*; 8:00 pm		North Dakota	W 65–52	2–2	McLeod Center (4,340); Cedar Falls, IA
12/01/2010*; 7:00 pm, KWWL		Iowa State	W 60–54	3–2	McLeod Center (6,489); Cedar Falls, IA
12/04/2010*; 1:00 pm, The Mtn.		at TCU	W 64–60	4–2	Daniel–Meyer Coliseum (4,022); Fort Worth, TX
12/07/2010*; 7:00 pm, BTN		at Iowa	L 39–51	4–3	Carver–Hawkeye Arena (10,667); Iowa City, IA
12/11/2010*; 7:00 pm		Morehead State	W 69–53	5–3	McLeod Center (3,820); Cedar Falls, IA
12/17/2010*; 7:00 pm		South Carolina State; Las Vegas Classic	W 66–52	6–3	McLeod Center (3,257); Cedar Falls, IA
12/19/2010*; 1:00 pm		SIU Edwardsville; Las Vegas Classic	W 68–47	7–3	McLeod Center (3,253); Cedar Falls, IA
12/22/2010*; 4:30 pm, CBSCS		vs. Indiana; Las Vegas Classic semi-finals	W 67–61	8–3	Orleans Arena (2,867); Paradise, NV
12/23/2010*; 9:00 pm, CBSCS		vs. New Mexico; Las Vegas Classic finals	W 66–60	9–3	Orleans Arena (3,725); Las Vegas, NV
12/29/2010; 7:00 pm, MVC TV		Missouri State	L 57–58	9–4 (0–1)	McLeod Center (4,890); Cedar Falls, IA
01/01/2011; 1:00 pm		at Southern Illinois	L 55–57	9–5 (0–2)	SIU Arena (4,045); Carbondale, IL
01/04/2011; 7:00 pm, KWWL		Evansville	W 65–53	10–5 (1–2)	McLeod Center (4,079); Cedar Falls, IA
01/07/2011; 7:00 pm		at Indiana State	L 45–70	10–6 (1–3)	Hulman Center (5,164); Terre Haute, IN
01/09/2011; 6:00 pm, KWWL		Bradley	W 83–77	11–6 (2–3)	McLeod Center (3,890); Cedar Falls, IA
01/12/2011; 7:00 pm		at Illinois State	W 46–44	12–6 (3–3)	Redbird Arena (4,021); Normal, IL
01/15/2011; 7:00 pm, KWWL		Southern Illinois	W 72–52	13–6 (4–3)	McLeod Center (5,062); Cedar Falls, IA
01/19/2011; 7:00 pm		at Wichita State	W 77–74	14–6 (5–3)	Charles Koch Arena (10,212); Wichita, KS
01/22/2011; 7:00 pm, KWWL		Drake	W 69–49	15–6 (6–3)	McLeod Center (6,971); Cedar Falls, IA
01/26/2011; 8:00 pm, ESPNU		Creighton	W 71–66	16–6 (7–3)	McLeod Center (6,415); Cedar Falls, IA
01/30/2011; 7:00 pm, ESPNU		at Missouri State	W 60–59	17–6 (8–3)	JQH Arena (9,901); Springfield, MO
02/02/2011; 7:00 pm, KWWL		Illinois State	W 53–51	18–6 (9–3)	McLeod Center (4,260); Cedar Falls, IA
02/05/2011; 12:00 pm, ESPNU		at Drake	L 69–72	18–7 (9–4)	Knapp Center (6,352); Des Moines, IA
02/08/2011; 7:00 pm		at Evansville	L 62–70	18–8 (9–5)	Roberts Municipal Stadium (3,794); Evansville, IN
02/12/2011; 9:00 pm, ESPN2		Wichita State	L 55–73	18–9 (9–6)	McLeod Center (7,014); Cedar Falls, IA
02/15/2011; 7:00 pm, MVC TV		at Bradley	W 80–70	19–9 (10–6)	Carver Arena (8,490); Peoria, IL
02/19/2011*; 6:00 pm, ESPN2		George Mason; ESPN BracketBusters	L 71–77	19–10	McLeod Center (6,580); Cedar Falls, IA
02/22/2011; 7:00 pm, KWWL		Indiana State	L 74–76	19–11 (10–7)	McLeod Center (4,419); Cedar Falls, IA
02/26/2011; 8:00 pm		at Creighton	L 55–62	19–12 (10–8)	Qwest Center Omaha (15,593); Omaha, NE
Missouri Valley tournament
03/04/2011; 2:35 pm, MVC TV	(4)	vs. (5) Creighton; MVC Quarterfinals	L 57–60	19–13	Scottrade Center (10,608); St. Louis, MO
CollegeInsider.com tournament
03/15/2011*; 7:00 pm, FCS Broadband		Rider; CIT First Round	W 84–50	20–13	McLeod Center (3,318); Cedar Falls, IA
03/21/2011*; 7:00 pm, FCS Broadband		SMU; CIT Quarterfinals	L 50–57	20–14	McLeod Center (3,968); Cedar Falls, IA
*Non-conference game. ^{#}Rankings from AP Poll. (#) Tournament seedings in parentheses. All times are in Central Time.
