= Cuonzo Martin =

American basketball player and coach (born 1971)

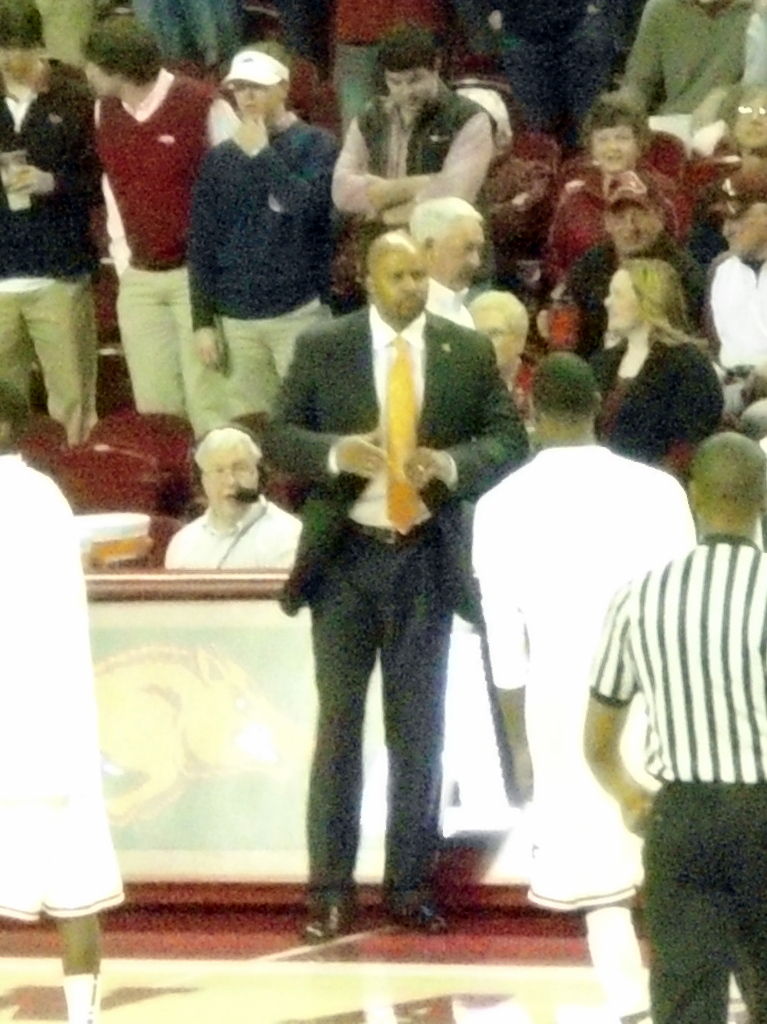
- Martin in 2013

Missouri State Bears
- Title: Head coach
- Conference: Conference USA

Personal information
- Born: September 23, 1971 (age 55) East St. Louis, Illinois, U.S.
- Listed height: 6 ft 5 in (1.96 m)
- Listed weight: 213 lb (97 kg)

Career information
- High school: Lincoln (East St. Louis, Illinois)
- College: Purdue (1991–1995)
- NBA draft: 1995: 2nd round, 57th overall pick
- Drafted by: Atlanta Hawks
- Playing career: 1995–1998
- Position: Shooting guard / small forward
- Number: 40, 21, 22
- Coaching career: 1999–present

Career history

Playing
- 1995–1996: Vancouver Grizzlies
- 1996–1997: Grand Rapids Mackers
- 1997: Milwaukee Bucks
- 1997–1998: Ciro Avellino

Coaching
- 1999–2000: West Lafayette HS (assistant)
- 2000–2007: Purdue (assistant)
- 2007–2008: Purdue (assoc. HC)
- 2008–2011: Missouri State
- 2011–2014: Tennessee
- 2014–2017: California
- 2017–2022: Missouri
- 2024–present: Missouri State

Career highlights
- As player: CBA All-Star (1997); All-CBA Second Team (1997); CBA All-Rookie First Team (1996); AP Honorable mention All-American (1995); First-team All-Big Ten (1995); As coach: CIT champion (2010); MVC regular season champion (2011); Ben Jobe Award (2011); MVC Coach of the Year (2011)
- Stats at NBA.com
- Stats at Basketball Reference

Cuonzo LaMar Martin (KOO-ON-zoh; born September 23, 1971) is an American basketball coach and former player who is in his second tenure as the head men's basketball coach at Missouri State University. He had held that same position from 2008 to 2011. He is the former head coach at the University of Tennessee, University of California, Berkeley, and the University of Missouri.

== High school ==
Playing alongside LaPhonso Ellis as a sophomore and junior, Martin played on two state championship teams for Lincoln High in his native East St. Louis, Illinois. Through his 3 years in the IHSA tournament, Martin scored 198 points and grabbed 111 rebounds in 12 games.

In 2007, Martin and Ellis were voted among the "100 Legends of the IHSA Boys Basketball Tournament," recognizing their superior performance in their appearances in the tournament.

== College career ==
Cuonzo Martin attended Purdue University, where he played for Gene Keady and alongside Wooden Award winner Glenn Robinson. The 6'6", 215 lb guard/forward helped lead the Purdue Boilermakers men's basketball team to back-to-back Big Ten Conference Titles in 1994 and 1995 and an Elite Eight appearance. Martin held future NBA players Shawn Respert of Michigan State and Wisconsin's Michael Finley to season lows in scoring as a senior. On March 24, 1994, Martin set a school record with the most three-pointers made in a game, making 8 of 13 threes against Kansas in a Sweet Sixteen, later broken by Carsen Edwards (3/23/19 Purdue vs Villanova). Known as the team's defensive stopper, he was also deadly beyond the arc. He left Purdue with the fourth most three-point shots made with 179, behind Jaraan Cornell's 242 record, while holding the record for the highest career three-point shooting with .451 accuracy. Martin was awarded First Team All-Big Ten honors his Senior season, averaging 18.4 points a game. He currently holds another school record for most consecutive games played with 137 straight throughout his career at Purdue.

== Professional career ==
Martin was selected by the Atlanta Hawks as the 57th pick in the 2nd round of the 1995 NBA draft. He played in only seven career NBA games for the 1995–96 expansion team Vancouver Grizzlies and the Milwaukee Bucks where he re-joined his college teammate and the number one pick in the 1994 NBA Draft Glenn Robinson during the 1996–97 season. He also played professionally in the Continental Basketball Association (CBA) for the Grand Rapids Mackers during the 1995–96 season and Grand Rapids Hoops during the 1996–97 and 1998–99 seasons. He was selected to the All-CBA Second Team in 1997 and All-Rookie First Team in 1996. He played for Ciro Avellino of Italian Lega Basket Serie A for the 1997–98 season. Martin was leading the Italian team in scoring. In November 1997, Martin asked to be sent home, due to various symptoms. He was diagnosed with non-Hodgkin lymphoma. Martin began aggressive treatments and chemotherapy and the cancer went into remission. Martin returned to Purdue to finish his degree. After he graduated, Gene Keady hired Martin as an assistant coach in 2000. The Cuonzo Martin Challenge Award to help raise funds for cancer research was established in his honor and he has since been cancer-free.

== Coaching career ==
=== Purdue ===
After one year as an assistant coach at West Lafayette High School, Martin returned to Purdue in 2000 to be an assistant coach under his former coach Gene Keady and former teammate, Matt Painter. He helped the Boilers to an Elite Eight appearance and three NCAA Second Round appearances, along with an overall 153–129 record during his eight seasons on the Purdue bench. He was named associate head coach for the 2007–08 season.

=== Missouri State ===
After eight seasons at Purdue, Martin accepted the head coaching position at Missouri State University on March 25, 2008. He replaced Barry Hinson. After falling to Auburn in the season opener, Martin had his first head coaching win over Central Michigan on the road. Martin's Bears won their first game at their new JQH Arena home, beating Arkansas from the SEC. They wrapped up the pre-conference season with a 7–4 record. Martin's Bears headed into conference play with only 3 players appearing in every game, due to a number of injuries. They lost their first conference game in overtime against an undefeated Illinois State. His Bears finished the season with an 11–20 record.

Following his first season as head coach, Martin's top 25 RPI-ranked Bears started the 2009–10 season with a 10–0 start. Missouri State averaged a 10+ margin in points per game coming into Missouri Valley Conference play. Cuonzo's squad finished seventh in conference play with a 20–12 record and accepted a bid to the CIT tournament, which they ended up winning to finish the season with a record of 24–12.

In Coach Martin's third year at Missouri State, the team won their first regular season Missouri Valley Men's Basketball title and entered the Arch Madness conference tournament as the #1 seed. After reaching the finals, they lost to the Indiana State Sycamores. Although having an RPI of 44, the team was not selected as an at-large team to the 2011 NCAA Men's Basketball tournament. They accepted a bid to the National Invitation Tournament, beating Murray State University at home and then losing to Miami (FL) away in the 2nd round. The team ended the season with a 26–9 record.

=== Tennessee ===
On March 27, 2011, after three seasons at Missouri State, Martin was hired as the head coach of the Tennessee Volunteers. In three seasons as head coach, Martin led the Volunteers to two NITs and to the 2014 NCAA tournament Sweet Sixteen.

After a slow start to the 2013–14 season, several fans began openly campaigning to have Martin replaced with his predecessor, Bruce Pearl, who was about to finish serving a show-cause penalty. An online petition urging athletic director Dave Hart Jr. to rehire Pearl drew 40,000 signatures. Later, Martin said that several of his own players were displeased with the way fans treated him.

=== California ===
On April 15, 2014, Martin was hired as the head coach of the University of California, Berkeley men's basketball team. In 2015–16, his second season, the Bears were led by freshman All-Americans Jaylen Brown and Ivan Rabb to a 23-win regular season and a number 4 seed in the South Region of the NCAA tournament, where they lost in the first round. Cal began the season ranked in the top 25 but fell out and resurfaced ranked 25th in early March after losing only one game in February, to #18 Arizona by 3 points. On October 25, 2016, Martin agreed to a contract extension through the 2020–21 season. Following Cal's loss in the first round of the 2017 National Invitation Tournament, Martin announced his resignation as head coach on March 15, 2017. Martin left for Missouri, with Cal facing the "likelihood of a depleted roster (the) next season".

=== Missouri ===
On March 15, 2017, the same day as his Cal resignation, Martin was hired as the head coach of the University of Missouri men's basketball team. On March 24, 2017, Martin received the commitment of top recruit and Missouri native Michael Porter Jr., also adding his father, Michael Porter Sr., to his coaching staff. He was released from his position on March 11, 2022, after finishing 78–77 overall and reaching two NCAA Tournaments.

On March 27, 2024, it was publicly announced that Martin would return to Missouri State as the men's basketball head coach

== Coaching notes ==
Cuonzo Martin became the fifth Division I head coach to come out of the Gene Keady coaching tree, following Bruce Weber, Steve Lavin, Kevin Stallings, Matt Painter, and Linc Darner. In the 2016 season, Martin (Cal), Painter (Purdue), and Stallings (Vandy) each entered the season ranked.

== Head coaching record ==
Record table
| Season | Team | Overall | Conference | Standing | Postseason |
|---|---|---|---|---|---|
Missouri State Bears (Missouri Valley Conference) (2008–2011)
| 2008–09 | Missouri State | 11–20 | 3–15 | 10th | |
| 2009–10 | Missouri State | 24–12 | 8–10 | 7th | CIT champion |
| 2010–11 | Missouri State | 26–9 | 15–3 | 1st | NIT Second Round |
Tennessee Volunteers (Southeastern Conference) (2011–2014)
| 2011–12 | Tennessee | 19–15 | 10–6 | T–2nd | NIT Second Round |
| 2012–13 | Tennessee | 20–13 | 11–7 | T–5th | NIT First Round |
| 2013–14 | Tennessee | 24–13 | 11–7 | 4th | NCAA Division I Sweet 16 |
| Tennessee: | | 63–41 (.606) | 32–20 (.615) | | |
California Golden Bears (Pac-12 Conference) (2014–2017)
| 2014–15 | California | 18–15 | 7–11 | T–8th | |
| 2015–16 | California | 23–11 | 12–6 | T–3rd | NCAA Division I Round of 64 |
| 2016–17 | California | 21–13 | 10–8 | T–5th | NIT First Round |
| California: | | 62–39 (.614) | 29–25 (.537) | | |
Missouri Tigers (Southeastern Conference) (2017–2022)
| 2017–18 | Missouri | 20–13 | 10–8 | T–4th | NCAA Division I Round of 64 |
| 2018–19 | Missouri | 15–17 | 5–13 | 12th | |
| 2019–20 | Missouri | 15–16 | 7–11 | T–10th | |
| 2020–21 | Missouri | 16–10 | 8–8 | 7th | NCAA Division I Round of 64 |
| 2021–22 | Missouri | 12–21 | 5–13 | 12th | |
| Missouri: | | 78–77 (.503) | 35–53 (.398) | | |
Missouri State Bears (Missouri Valley Conference) (2024–2025)
| 2024–25 | Missouri State | 9–23 | 2–18 | 12th | |
Missouri State Bears (Conference USA) (2025–present)
| 2025–26 | Missouri State | 16–18 | 8–12 | T–8th | |
| Missouri State: | | 86–82 (.512) | 36–58 (.383) | | |
| Total: | | 289–239 (.547) | | | |
National champion Postseason invitational champion Conference regular season champion Conference regular season and conference tournament champion Division regular season champion Division regular season and conference tournament champion Conference tournament champion
