= 2010–11 Wichita State Shockers men's basketball team =

American college basketball season

2010–11 Wichita State Shockers men's basketball

NIT Champions
- Conference: Missouri Valley Conference
- Record: 29–8 (14–4 MVC)
- Head coach: Gregg Marshall (4th season)
- Assistant coaches: Chris Jans; Marty Gross; Chad Dollar
- Home arena: Charles Koch Arena

2010–11 Missouri Valley Conference men's basketball standings
	Conf.				Overall
Team	W		L	PCT	W		L	PCT
Missouri State	15	–	3	.833	26	–	9	.743
Wichita State	14	–	4	.778	29	–	8	.784
Indiana State †	12	–	6	.667	20	–	14	.588
Northern Iowa	10	–	8	.556	20	–	14	.588
Creighton	10	–	8	.556	23	–	16	.590
Evansville	9	–	9	.500	16	–	16	.500
Drake	7	–	11	.389	13	–	18	.419
Southern Illinois	5	–	13	.278	13	–	19	.406
Illinois State	4	–	14	.222	12	–	19	.387
Bradley	4	–	14	.222	12	–	20	.375
† 2011 MVC tournament winner As of April 1, 2011; Rankings from AP Poll

The 2010–11 Wichita State Shockers men's basketball team represented Wichita State University in the 2010–11 NCAA Division I men's basketball season. A member of the Missouri Valley Conference (MVC), they were led by fourth-year head coach Gregg Marshall and played their home games at Charles Koch Arena in Wichita, Kansas. They finished the season 29–8, with a 14–4 record in MVC play, finishing in second place behind Missouri State. In the 2011 Missouri Valley Conference men's basketball tournament, they advanced to the semifinals before losing to Indiana State. The Shockers earned a 2011 National Invitation Tournament bid and a No. 4 seed. They defeated Nebraska in first round, and then earned an overtime win over Virginia Tech in the second round. They defeated the College of Charleston in the quarterfinals and earned a trip to the semi-finals in Madison Square Garden in New York City. The Shockers then upset Washington State in the semifinals, and finally, defeated top-seeded Alabama in the championship, earning their first NIT Championship in school history.

== Roster ==
2010–11 Wichita State Shockers men's basketball team
Players
Coaches

Pos.	#	Name	Height	Weight	Year	Hometown
F	0	Aaron Ellis	6 ft 9 in (2.06 m)	208 lb (94 kg)	Sr	Myrtle Beach, South Carolina
G	1	Joe Ragland	6 ft 0 in (1.83 m)	193 lb (88 kg)	Jr	West Springfield, Massachusetts
G	3	Trey Jones	6 ft 1 in (1.85 m)	167 lb (76 kg)	Fr	Sherman, Texas
F	4	Jerome Hamilton (S)	6 ft 7 in (2.01 m)	220 lb (100 kg)	RS Fr	Warwick, Georgia
G	5	Demetric Williams	6 ft 2 in (1.88 m)	174 lb (79 kg)	So	Las Vegas, Nevada
F	11	Josh Walker	6 ft 8 in (2.03 m)	245 lb (111 kg)	So	Derby, Kansas
G/F	14	Graham Hatch	6 ft 4 in (1.93 m)	206 lb (93 kg)	Sr	Mesa, Arizona
F	15	Randall Vautravers	6 ft 6 in (1.98 m)	180 lb (82 kg)	Fr	Andover, Kansas
F	20	Ben Smith	6 ft 5 in (1.96 m)	215 lb (98 kg)	Jr	Oklahoma City, Oklahoma
C	21	Ehimen Orukpe	7 ft 0 in (2.13 m)	252 lb (114 kg)	So	Lagos, Nigeria
F	22	Tyler Richardson	6 ft 4 in (1.93 m)	207 lb (94 kg)	RS Fr	Huntsville, Alabama
G	23	Toure' Murry	6 ft 5 in (1.96 m)	203 lb (92 kg)	Jr	Houston, Texas
G	24	David Kyles	6 ft 4 in (1.93 m)	184 lb (83 kg)	Jr	Dallas, Texas
G	25	Derek Brown	6 ft 5 in (1.96 m)	185 lb (84 kg)	Sr	Pleasanton, Kansas
F/C	31	J. T. Durley	6 ft 8 in (2.03 m)	236 lb (107 kg)	RS Sr	Pittsburg, Texas
F	32	Gabe Blair	6 ft 8 in (2.03 m)	235 lb (107 kg)	Sr	Gastonia, North Carolina
C	41	Garrett Stutz	7 ft 0 in (2.13 m)	256 lb (116 kg)	Jr	Kansas City, Missouri

Head coach

- Gregg Marshall

Assistant coach(es)

- Chris Jans
- Marty Gross
- Chad Dollar

Legend

- (C) Team captain
- (S) Suspended
- (I) Ineligible
- (W) Walk-on
- Injured
- Current redshirt

Roster
Last update: 2010-10-22

== 2010–11 Schedule and results ==
- All times are Central

Date time, TV	Rank^{#}	Opponent^{#}	Result	Record	Site (attendance) city, state
Exhibition
Wed, Nov 10; 7:05pm		Newman	W 80–62	—	Charles Koch Arena (10,353); Wichita, KS
Regular season
Tue, Nov 16*; 7:05pm		Texas Southern	W 79–67	1–0	Charles Koch Arena (10,387); Wichita, KS
Mon, Nov 22*; 2:30pm, ESPN2		vs. Connecticut; Maui Invitational	L 79–83	1–1	Lahaina Civic Center (2,400); Lahaina, Hawaii
Tue, Nov 23*; 1:00pm, ESPN2		at Chaminade; Maui Invitational	W 79–58	2–1	Lahaina Civic Center (2,400); Lahaina, Hawaii
Wed, Nov 24*; 6:30pm, ESPNU		vs. Virginia; Maui Invitational	W 70–58	3–1	Lahaina Civic Center (2,400); Lahaina, Hawaii
Mon, Nov 29*; 7:05pm		UMKC	W 71–52	4–1	Charles Koch Arena (10,154); Wichita, KS
Wed, Dec 1*; 7:05pm		Chicago State	W 91–51	5–1	Charles Koch Arena (10,300); Wichita, KS
Sat, Dec 4*; 9:05pm, The Mtn.		at No. 17 San Diego State; MWC–MVC Challenge	L 69–83	6–1	Viejas Arena (12,414); San Diego, CA
Wed, Dec 10*; 7:05pm, Kansas 22		Nicholls State	W 68–50	6–2	Charles Koch Arena (10,430); Wichita, KS
Mon, Dec 13*; 7:05pm		Alabama A&M	W 71–49	7–2	Charles Koch Arena (10,173); Wichita, KS
Sat, Dec 18*; 7:00pm, Kansas 22		vs. LSU	W 70–69	8–2	CenturyTel Center (2,165); Bossier City, LA
Tue, Dec 21*; 7:05pm, Kansas 22		Tulsa	W 82–79	9–2	Intrust Bank Arena (14,112); Wichita, KS
Wed, Dec 29; 7:05pm		Evansville	W 91–57	10–2 (1–0)	Charles Koch Arena (10,506); Wichita, KS
Sat, Jan 1; 6:35pm, ESPNU		at Bradley	W 79–63	11–2 (2–0)	Carver Arena (8,410); Peoria, IL
Tue, Jan 4; 7:05pm, Kansas 22		Drake	W 82–63	12–2 (3–0)	Charles Koch Arena (10,506); Wichita, KS
Fri, Jan 7; 7:05pm, Kansas 22		at Illinois State	W 65–51	13–2 (4–0)	Redbird Arena (4,598); Normal, IL
Sun, Jan 9; 7:35pm, ESPNU		Missouri State	L 56–59	13–3 (4–1)	Charles Koch Arena (10,506); Wichita, KS
Wed, Jan 12; 7:05pm, Kansas 22		at Creighton	W 68–54	14–3 (5–1)	Qwest Center Omaha (15,481); Omaha, NE
Sat, Jan 15; 7:05pm, Kansas 22		at Drake	W 68–54	15–3 (6–1)	Knapp Center (3,872); Des Moines, IA
Wed, Jan 19; 7:05pm		Northern Iowa	L 74–77	15–4 (6–2)	Charles Koch Arena (10,212); Wichita, KS
Sat, Jan 22; 7:05pm		Indiana State	W 93–83 ^{3OT}	16–4 (7–2)	Charles Koch Arena (10,506); Wichita, KS
Wed, Jan 26; 6:05pm, MVC TV/FSN		at Southern Illinois	W 74–64	17–4 (8–2)	SIU Arena (4,122); Carbondale, IL
Sat, Jan 29; 1:05pm, ESPN2		Bradley	W 61–41	18–4 (9–2)	Charles Koch Arena (10,506); Wichita, KS
Tue, Feb 1; 6:05pm		at Indiana State	W 70–54	19–4 (10–2)	Hulman Center (2,913); Terre Haute, IN
Sat, Feb 5; 7:05pm		Illinois State	W 74–57	20–4 (11–2)	Charles Koch Arena (10,506); Wichita, KS
Sat, Feb 8; 7:05pm		Southern Illinois	L 53–56	20–5 (11–3)	Charles Koch Arena (10,147); Wichita, KS
Sat, Feb 12; 9:05pm		at Northern Iowa	W 73–55	21–5 (12–3)	McLeod Center (7,014); Cedar Falls, IA
Tue, Feb 15; 7:05pm		at Evansville	W 80–74	22–5 (13–3)	Roberts Stadium (4,116); Evansville, IN
Fri, Feb 18*; 6:05pm, ESPN2		VCU; ESPN BracketBusters	L 67–68	22–6	Charles Koch Arena (10,506); Wichita, KS
Wed, Feb 23; 7:05pm, MVC TV/FSN		Creighton	W 69–67	23–6 (14–3)	Charles Koch Arena (10,506); Wichita, KS
Sat, Feb 26; 12:05pm, ESPN2		at Missouri State	L 64–69	23–7 (14–4)	JQH Arena (11,077); Springfield, MO
Missouri Valley tournament
Fri, Mar 4; 6:05pm, MVC TV	(2)	vs. (10) Bradley; MVC Quarterfinals	W 70–56	24–7	Scottrade Center (9,318); St. Louis, MO
Sat, Mar 5; 4:05pm, MVC TV	(2)	vs. (3) Indiana State; MVC Semifinals	L 54–61	24–8	Scottrade Center (13,533); St. Louis, MO
NIT
Wed, Mar 16*; 6:00pm, ESPN2	(4 VT)	(5 VT) Nebraska; NIT First Round	W 76–49	25–8	Charles Koch Arena (7,336); Wichita, KS
Sun, Mar 20*; 10:00am, ESPN	(4 VT)	at (1 VT) Virginia Tech; NIT Second Round	W 79–76 ^{OT}	26–8	Cassell Coliseum (4,382); Blacksburg, VA
Wed, Mar 23*; 6:00pm, ESPN2	(4 VT)	(6 VT) College of Charleston; NIT Quarterfinals	W 82–75	27–8	Charles Koch Arena (10,506); Wichita, KS
Tue, Mar 29*; 6:00pm, ESPN2	(4 VT)	vs. (2 BC) Washington State; NIT Semifinals	W 75–44	28–8	Madison Square Garden (6,082); New York, NY
Thu, Mar 31*; 6:00pm, ESPN2	(4 VT)	vs. (1 A) Alabama; NIT Championship Game	W 66–57	29–8	Madison Square Garden (6,206); New York, NY
*Non-conference game. ^{#}Rankings from AP Poll. (#) Tournament seedings in parentheses. A=NIT Alabama bracket. BC=NIT Boston College bracket. VT=NIT Virginia Tech bracket. All times are in Central Time.
