= 2010–11 Illinois State Redbirds men's basketball team =

American college basketball season

2010–11 Illinois State Redbirds men's basketball

Global Sports Roundball Classic champion
- Conference: Missouri Valley Conference
- Record: 12–19 (4–14 MVC)
- Head coach: Tim Jankovich (4th season)
- Assistant coaches: Rob Judson; Anthony Beane; Paris Parham
- Home arena: Redbird Arena

2010–11 Missouri Valley Conference men's basketball standings
	Conf.				Overall
Team	W		L	PCT	W		L	PCT
Missouri State	15	–	3	.833	26	–	9	.743
Wichita State	14	–	4	.778	29	–	8	.784
Indiana State †	12	–	6	.667	20	–	14	.588
Northern Iowa	10	–	8	.556	20	–	14	.588
Creighton	10	–	8	.556	23	–	16	.590
Evansville	9	–	9	.500	16	–	16	.500
Drake	7	–	11	.389	13	–	18	.419
Southern Illinois	5	–	13	.278	13	–	19	.406
Illinois State	4	–	14	.222	12	–	19	.387
Bradley	4	–	14	.222	12	–	20	.375
† 2011 MVC tournament winner As of April 1, 2011; Rankings from AP Poll

The 2010–11 Illinois State Redbirds men's basketball team represented Illinois State University during the 2010–11 NCAA Division I men's basketball season. The Redbirds, led by fourth year head coach Tim Jankovich, played their home games at Redbird Arena and competed as a member of the Missouri Valley Conference.

They finished the season 12–19, 4–14 in conference play to finish in a tie for ninth place. They were the number nine seed for the Missouri Valley Conference tournament. They were defeated by Southern Illinois University in their opening round game.

== Roster ==
2010–11 Illinois State Redbirds men's basketball team
Players
Coaches

Pos.	#	Name	Height	Weight	Year	Hometown
G	4	Matt Coates	5 ft 9 in (1.75 m)	170 lb (77 kg)	RS Sr	Peoria, IL
F	50	Blake Mishler	6 ft 8 in (2.03 m)	245 lb (111 kg)	RS Sr	Metamora, IL
F	43	Austin Hill	6 ft 1 in (1.85 m)	215 lb (98 kg)	Sr	Covington, KY
F	34	Tony Lewis	6 ft 7 in (2.01 m)	245 lb (111 kg)	Sr	Chicago, IL
G	10	Alex Rubin	6 ft 1 in (1.85 m)	190 lb (86 kg)	Sr	Plymouth, MN
G	3	Trey Blue	6 ft 3 in (1.91 m)	195 lb (88 kg)	So	Chicago, IL
F	32	Jackie Carmichael	6 ft 9 in (2.06 m)	240 lb (109 kg)	So	Manhattan, KS
G	33	Justin Clark	6 ft 4 in (1.93 m)	185 lb (84 kg)	So	Independence, MO
G	5	Anthony Cousin	5 ft 11 in (1.8 m)	185 lb (84 kg)	So	Anchorage, AK
G	23	Kenyon Smith	5 ft 11 in (1.8 m)	183 lb (83 kg)	So	Chicago, IL
G	13	John Wilkins	6 ft 9 in (2.06 m)	225 lb (102 kg)	So	Antibes, France
F	22	Jon Ekey	6 ft 7 in (2.01 m)	215 lb (98 kg)	RS Fr	Independence, MO
G	1	Zeke Upshaw	6 ft 6 in (1.98 m)	210 lb (95 kg)	RS Fr	Chicago, IL
C	42	Jordan Threloff (redshirt)	6 ft 10 in (2.08 m)	255 lb (116 kg)	Fr	DeKalb, IL

Head coach

- Tim Jankovich (Kansas State)

Assistant coach(es)

- Rob Judson (Illinois)
- Anthony Beane (Kansas State)
- Paris Parham (Minnesota State)

Legend

- (C) Team captain
- (S) Suspended
- (I) Ineligible
- (W) Walk-on
- Injured
- Current redshirt

== Schedule ==
Date time, TV	Rank^{#}	Opponent^{#}	Result	Record	High points	High rebounds	High assists	Site (attendance) city, state
Exhibition Season
November 10, 2010*; 7:05 pm		Quincy	W 80–70		11 – Clark	–	–	Redbird Arena; Normal, IL
Regular Season
November 14, 2010*; 2:05 pm		Southern Illinois-Edwardsville	W 92–64	1–0	18 – Mishler, Carmichael	9 – Clark	4 – Ekey	Redbird Arena (4,235); Normal, IL
November 17, 2010*; 2:05 pm		Tennessee State	W 73–68	2–0	20 – Clark	7 – Carmichael	6 – Cousin	Redbird Arena (4,401); Normal, IL
November 21, 2010*; 2:05 pm		at Arkansas–Little Rock	L 54–63	2–1	14 – Blue	13 – Lewis	3 – Smith	Jack Stephens Center (2,532); Little Rock, AR
November 26, 2010*; 6:05 pm		South Dakota; Global Sports Roundball Classic	W 73–68	3–1	22 – Carmichael	8 – Lewis	6 – Hill	Redbird Arena (4,344); Normal, IL
November 27, 2010*; 6:05 pm		Louisiana–Monroe; Global Sports Roundball Classic	W 73–68	4–1	16 – Hill	7 – Lewis	3 – Carmichael	Redbird Arena (4,395); Normal, IL
November 28, 2010*; 3:35 pm		Jacksonville State; Global Sports Roundball Classic	W 60–47	5–1	11 – Clark	9 – Lewis	3 – Blue	Redbird Arena (4,059); Normal, IL
December 1, 2010*; 7:05 pm		No. 23 Nevada-Las Vegas; MWC–MVC Challenge	L 51–82	5–2	15 – Hill	8 – Lewis	2 – Hill, Rubin, Blue	Redbird Arena (6,485); Normal, IL
December 4, 2010*; 7:05 pm, CSN		Montana State	W 62–56	6–2	16 – Wilkins	8 – Lewis	3 – Cousin	Redbird Arena (4,084); Normal, IL
December 8, 2010*; 7:05 pm		Ohio	L 65–67	6–3	16 – Carmichael	12 – Lewis	4 – Hill, Blue, Wilkins	Redbird Arena (4,027); Normal, IL
December 11, 2010*; 7:05 pm, CSN		Illinois-Chicago	W 53–43	7–3	15 – Hill	6 – Wilkins	3 – Rubin	Redbird Arena (3,942); Normal, IL
December 20, 2010*; 6:05 pm		at North Carolina-Wilmington	W 62–60 ^{OT}	8–3	22 – Ekey	12 – Ekey	4 – Cousin	Trask Coliseum (4,024); Wilmington, NC
December 29, 2010; 7:05 pm		Creighton	L 53–64	8–4 (0–1)	12 – Cousin	7 – Lewis, Ekey	3 – Hill, Rubin	Redbird Arena (6,158); Normal, IL
January 1, 2011; 7:05 pm		at Missouri State	L 71–82	8–5 (0–2)	23 – Cousin	8 – Carmichael	5 – Cousin	JQH Arena (7,612); Springfield, MO
January 4, 2011; 6:05 pm		at Indiana State	L 57–72	8–6 (0–3)	16 – Carmichael	4 – Carmichael, Ekey	3 – Ekey	Hulman Center (4,275); Terre Haute, IN
January 7, 2011; 7:05 pm		Wichita State	L 51–65	8–7 (0–4)	14 – Hill	6 – Lewis	5 – Hill	Redbird Arena (4,598); Normal, IL
January 9, 2011; 2:05 pm, CSN		at Southern Illinois	L 59–63	8–8 (0–5)	13 – Carmichael, Wilkins	5 – Lewis, Carmichael, Wilkins	4 – Cousin, Ekey	SIU Arena (4,457); Carbondale, IL
January 12, 2011; 7:05 pm		Northern Iowa	L 44–46 ^{OT}	8–9 (0–6)	10 – Mishler	8 – Carmichael	3 – Hill	Redbird Arena (4,021); Normal, IL
January 15, 2011; 6:05 pm, MVC-TV		Evansville	L 54–59	8–10 (0–7)	9 – Upshaw	7 – Lewis, Ekey	4 – Cousin	Redbird Arena (4,612); Normal, IL
January 18, 2011; 7:05 pm		at Drake	L 68–76	8–11 (0–8)	18 – Hill	7 – Lewis	4 – Clark	Knapp Center (3,748); Des Monies, IA
January 23, 2011; 7:05 pm, ESPNU		Southern Illinois	W 59–55	9–11 (1–8)	15 – Lewis	8 – Lewis	2 – Blue	Redbird Arena (3,695); Normal, IL
January 26, 2011; 7:05 pm, WTVP		at Bradley	W 79–78 ^{OT}	10–11 (2–8)	24 – Carmichael	17 – Carmichael	3 – Rubin, Cousin	Carver Arena (10,592); Peoria, IL
January 30, 2011; 2:05 pm, MVC-TV		Drake	W 77–75 ^{OT}	11–11 (3–8)	15 – Wilkins	11 – Carmichael	4 – Hill	Redbird Arena (5,016); Normal, IL
February 2, 2011; 7:05 pm		at Northern Iowa	L 66–71	11–12 (3–9)	15 – Cousin	10 – Carmichael	3 – Hill, Cousin	McLeod Center (4,260); Cedar Falls, IA
February 5, 2011; 7:05 pm		at Wichita State	L 57–74	11–13 (3–10)	16 – Lewis	7 – Lewis	3 – Rubin	Charles Koch Arena (10,506); Wichita, KS
February 9, 2011; 7:05 pm		Indiana State	L 46–56	11–14 (3–11)	11 – Lewis	8 – Lewis	3 – Ekey	Redbird Arena (4,039); Normal, IL
February 12, 2011; 7:05 pm		Missouri State	L 59–68	11–15 (3–12)	23 – Hill	8 – Lewis	3 – Hill	Redbird Arena (5,204); Normal, IL
February 16, 2011; 7:05 pm		at Creighton	L 59–75	11–16 (3–13)	27 – Hill	7 – Mishler	3 – Lewis	Qwest Center Omaha (14,702); Omaha, NE
February 19, 2011*; 1:00 pm		at Western Michigan; ESPN BracketBusters	L 65–68	11–17	12 – Hill	8 – Lewis	5 – Cousin	University Arena (3,066); Kalamazoo, MI
February 22, 2011; 7:05 pm, MVC-TV		Bradley	W 51–50	12–17 (4–13)	19 – Carmichael	13 – Carmichael	3 – Blue, Clark	Redbird Arena (6,126); Normal, IL
February 26, 2011; 2:05 pm		at Evansville	L 67–73	12–18 (4–14)	12 – Lewis, Cousin	9 – Lewis	4 – Cousin	Roberts Municipal Stadium (10,581); Evansville, IN
Missouri Valley Conference (MVC) tournament
March 3, 2011*; 6:05 pm	(9)	vs. (8) Southern Illinois; Opening Round	L 54–57	12–19	13 – Hill	10 – Lewis	3 – Rubin, Cousin	Scottrade Center (6,675); St. Louis, MO
*Non-conference game. ^{#}Rankings from AP Poll. (#) Tournament seedings in parentheses. All times are in Central Standard Time.
