= 2010–11 Evansville Purple Aces men's basketball team =

American college basketball season

2010–11 Evansville Purple Aces men's basketball

CBI, Quarterfinals
- Conference: Missouri Valley Conference
- Record: 16–16 (9–9 Missouri Valley)
- Head coach: Marty Simmons (4th season)
- Assistant coaches: Jimmy Elgas (4th season); Carson Harris (1st season); Chris Hollender (2nd season)
- Home arena: Roberts Municipal Stadium

2010–11 Missouri Valley Conference men's basketball standings
	Conf.				Overall
Team	W		L	PCT	W		L	PCT
Missouri State	15	–	3	.833	26	–	9	.743
Wichita State	14	–	4	.778	29	–	8	.784
Indiana State †	12	–	6	.667	20	–	14	.588
Northern Iowa	10	–	8	.556	20	–	14	.588
Creighton	10	–	8	.556	23	–	16	.590
Evansville	9	–	9	.500	16	–	16	.500
Drake	7	–	11	.389	13	–	18	.419
Southern Illinois	5	–	13	.278	13	–	19	.406
Illinois State	4	–	14	.222	12	–	19	.387
Bradley	4	–	14	.222	12	–	20	.375
† 2011 MVC tournament winner As of April 1, 2011; Rankings from AP Poll

The 2010–11 Evansville Purple Aces men's basketball team represented the University of Evansville in the 2010–11 NCAA Division I men's basketball season. The Purple Aces, led by head coach Marty Simmons, played their home games at Roberts Municipal Stadium in Evansville, Indiana, as members of the Missouri Valley Conference. The Purple Aces finished sixth in the Missouri Valley during the regular season, and were eliminated in the quarterfinals of the Missouri Valley tournament by eventual tournament champion Indiana State.

Evansville failed to qualify for the NCAA tournament, but were invited to the 2011 College Basketball Invitational. The Purple Aces defeated Hofstra in the first round of the CBI for the program's first postseason victory since the 1989 NCAA tournament. Evansville were eliminated in the quarterfinals of the CBI, losing to Boise State, 75–69.

This was Evansville's last season playing at Roberts Stadium; for the 2011–12 season, the Purple Aces moved to the new downtown Ford Center.

== Roster ==
2010–11 Evansville Purple Aces men's basketball team
Players
Coaches

Pos.	#	Name	Height	Weight	Year	Hometown
G	2	Kavon Lacey	6 ft 0 in (1.83 m)	194 lb (88 kg)	Sr	Alton, Illinois
F/C	3	Matt Peeler	6 ft 8 in (2.03 m)	240 lb (109 kg)	Jr	Alamogordo, New Mexico
G/F	4	Lewis Jones	6 ft 3 in (1.91 m)	205 lb (93 kg)	So	Memphis, Tennessee
G	5	Troy Taylor	6 ft 0 in (1.83 m)	184 lb (83 kg)	So	Anderson, Indiana
G	10	Brandon Williams	6 ft 0 in (1.83 m)	170 lb (77 kg)	Jr	Charlotte, Tennessee
G/F	11	Colt Ryan	6 ft 5 in (1.96 m)	210 lb (95 kg)	So	Batesville, Indiana
G/F	13	Jordan Jahr	6 ft 6 in (1.98 m)	205 lb (93 kg)	Fr	Austin, Texas
G	20	Andy Chinn	6 ft 0 in (1.83 m)	165 lb (75 kg)	So	Tell City, Indiana
G	22	Ned Cox	6 ft 1 in (1.85 m)	185 lb (84 kg)	So	San Antonio, Texas
G	24	Taylor Gray	6 ft 3 in (1.91 m)	200 lb (91 kg)	Fr	Kuttawa, Kentucky
G/F	32	Kenneth Harris	6 ft 6 in (1.98 m)	185 lb (84 kg)	Jr	St. Louis, Missouri
G/F	34	Denver Holmes	6 ft 4 in (1.93 m)	180 lb (82 kg)	Jr	Olathe, Kansas
C	41	Pieter von Tongeren	6 ft 10 in (2.08 m)	255 lb (116 kg)	Sr	Driehuis, Netherlands
F/C	52	Clint Hopf	6 ft 8 in (2.03 m)	256 lb (116 kg)	Sr	Ferdinand, Indiana

Head coach

- Marty Simmons (Evansville)

Assistant coach(es)

- Jimmy Elgas (Illinois State)
- Chris Hollender (Evansville)
- Carson Harris (Manchester (IN))

Legend

- (C) Team captain
- (S) Suspended
- (I) Ineligible
- (W) Walk-on
- Injured
- Current redshirt

Roster
Last update: January 24, 2023

== Schedule and results ==
Date time, TV	Rank^{#}	Opponent^{#}	Result	Record	Site (attendance) city, state
Exhibition
October 30, 2010*; 7:05 pm		DePauw	L 62–66	—	Roberts Municipal Stadium; Evansville, IN
November 6, 2010*; 7:05 pm		Kentucky Wesleyan	W 71–69	—	Roberts Municipal Stadium; Evansville, IN
Regular season
November 13, 2010*; 7:05 pm		Oakland City	W 82–42	1–0	Roberts Municipal Stadium (4,582); Evansville, IN
November 17, 2010*; 7:35 pm		UTSA	W 77–73	2–0	Roberts Municipal Stadium (3,768); Evansville, IN
November 21, 2010*; 12:00 pm		at Indiana	L 54–67	2–1	Simon Skjodt Assembly Hall (16,251); Bloomington, IN
November 24, 2010*; 7:00 pm		at Middle Tennessee	L 70–82	2–2	Murphy Center (2,912); Murfreesboro, TN
November 27, 2010*; 1:00 pm		at Butler	W 71–68 ^{OT}	3–2	Hinkle Fieldhouse (6,622); Indianapolis, IN
December 5, 2010*; 2:05 pm		at Air Force; MWC-MVC Challenge	L 56–57	3–3	Clune Arena (1,148); Colorado Springs, CO
December 8, 2010*; 6:05 pm, ESPNU		North Carolina	L 49–76	3–4	Roberts Municipal Stadium (12,116); Evansville, IN
December 11, 2010*; 7:05 pm		Maryland Eastern Shore	W 90–56	4–4	Roberts Municipal Stadium (3,667); Evansville, IN
December 18, 2010*; 2:05 pm		Middle Tennessee	W 81–79	5–4	Roberts Municipal Stadium (3,914); Evansville, IN
December 23, 2010*; 7:05 pm		Norfolk State	W 87–69	6–4	Roberts Municipal Stadium (3,946); Evansville, IN
December 29, 2010; 7:05 pm		at Wichita State	L 57–91	6–5 (0–1)	Charles Koch Arena (10,506); Wichita, KS
January 1, 2011; 7:05 pm, Fox Sports Net		Indiana State	W 64–59	7–5 (1–1)	Roberts Municipal Stadium (4,587); Evansville, IN
January 4, 2011; 7:05 pm		at Northern Iowa	L 53–65	7–6 (1–2)	McLeod Center (4,079); Cedar Rapids, IA
January 7, 2011; 7:05 pm		at Missouri State	L 50–65	7–7 (1–3)	JQH Arena (9,134); Springfield, MO
January 9, 2011; 3:35 pm		Creighton	L 69–74	7–8 (1–4)	Roberts Municipal Stadium (4,732); Evansville, IN
January 12, 2011; 7:05 pm		Drake	W 67–51	8–8 (2–4)	Roberts Municipal Stadium (3,118); Evansville, IN
January 15, 2011; 6:05 pm, Fox Sports Net		at Illinois State	W 59–54	9–8 (3–4)	Redbird Arena (4,612); Normal, IL
January 18, 2011; 7:05 pm		at Southern Illinois	L 55–67	9–9 (3–5)	SIU Arena (4,059); Carbondale, IL
January 23, 2011; 1:05 pm		Bradley	W 70–67	10–9 (4–5)	Roberts Municipal Stadium (1,533); Evansville, IN
January 26, 2011; 6:05 pm		at Indiana State	W 66–63	11–9 (5–5)	Hulman Center (5,579); Terre Haute, IN
January 29, 2011; 7:05 pm		Southern Illinois	W 66–49	12–9 (6–5)	Roberts Municipal Stadium (6,847); Evansville, IN
February 2, 2011; 7:05 pm		Missouri State	W 77–65	13–9 (7–5)	Roberts Municipal Stadium (3,463); Evansville, IN
February 5, 2011; 2:05 pm		at Creighton	L 69–75	13–10 (7–6)	Qwest Center Omaha (14,850); Omaha, NE
February 8, 2011; 7:05 pm		Northern Iowa	W 70–62	14–10 (8–6)	Roberts Municipal Stadium (3,794); Evansville, IN
February 12, 2011; 7:05 pm		at Bradley	L 54–68	14–11 (8–7)	Carver Arena (10,019); Peoria, IL
February 15, 2011; 7:05 pm		Wichita State	L 74–80	14–12 (8–8)	Roberts Municipal Stadium (4,116); Evansville, IN
February 19, 2011*; 7:00 pm		at Murray State; ESPN BracketBusters	L 47–72	14–13	CFSB Center (4,024); Murray, KY
February 23, 2011; 7:05 pm		at Drake	L 69–87	14–14 (8–9)	Knapp Center (4,328); Des Moines, IA
February 26, 2011; 2:05 pm		Illinois State; Last Game at Roberts Stadium	W 73–67	15–14 (9–9)	Roberts Municipal Stadium (10,581); Evansville, IN
Missouri Valley tournament
March 4, 2011; 8:35 pm	(6)	vs. (3) Indiana State; MVC Quarterfinals	L 50–52	15–15	Scottrade Center (9,318); St. Louis, MO
CBI
March 15, 2011; 7:05 pm		Hofstra; CBI First Round	W 77–70	16–15	Physical Activities Center (1,284); Evansville, IN
March 21, 2011; 8:00 pm		at Boise State; CBI Quarterfinals	L 69–75	16–16	Taco Bell Arena (5,913); Boise, ID
*Non-conference game. ^{#}Rankings from AP Poll. (#) Tournament seedings in parentheses. All times are in Central Time.
