= 2010–11 Creighton Bluejays men's basketball team =

American college basketball season

2010–11 Creighton Bluejays men's basketball
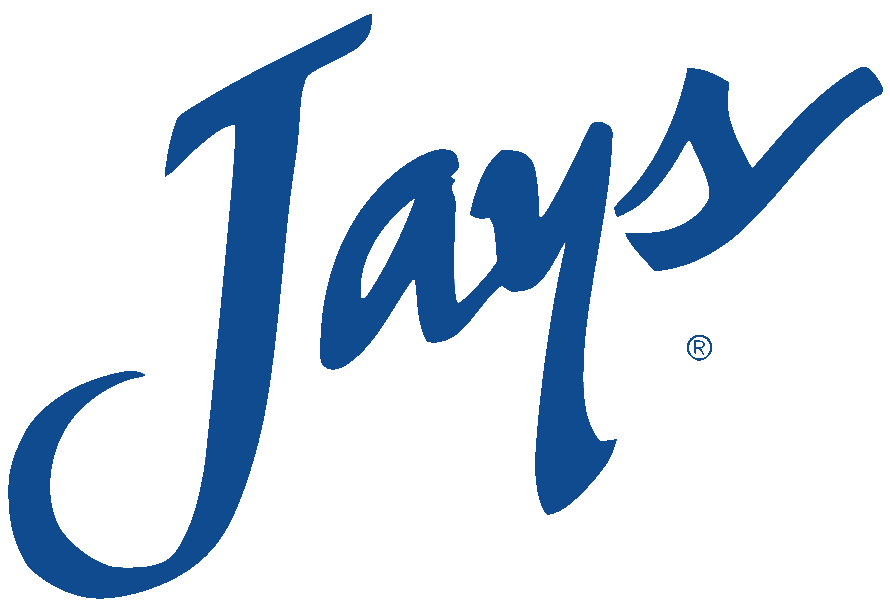

CBI Finals vs Oregon, L 1–2
- Conference: Missouri Valley Conference
- Record: 23–16 (10–8 The Valley)
- Head coach: Greg McDermott (1st year)
- Assistant coaches: Darian DeVries (13th year); Steve Lutz (1st year); Steve Merfeld (1st year)
- Home arena: Qwest Center Omaha

2010–11 Missouri Valley Conference men's basketball standings
	Conf.				Overall
Team	W		L	PCT	W		L	PCT
Missouri State	15	–	3	.833	26	–	9	.743
Wichita State	14	–	4	.778	29	–	8	.784
Indiana State †	12	–	6	.667	20	–	14	.588
Northern Iowa	10	–	8	.556	20	–	14	.588
Creighton	10	–	8	.556	23	–	16	.590
Evansville	9	–	9	.500	16	–	16	.500
Drake	7	–	11	.389	13	–	18	.419
Southern Illinois	5	–	13	.278	13	–	19	.406
Illinois State	4	–	14	.222	12	–	19	.387
Bradley	4	–	14	.222	12	–	20	.375
† 2011 MVC tournament winner As of April 1, 2011; Rankings from AP Poll

The 2010–11 Creighton Bluejays men's basketball team represented Creighton University during the 2010–11 NCAA Division I men's basketball season. The Bluejays, led by first year head coach Greg McDermott, played their home games at the Qwest Center Omaha as members of the Missouri Valley Conference. They finished the season 23–16, 10–8 in MVC play and lost in the semifinals of the 2011 Missouri Valley Conference men's basketball tournament to Missouri State. They were invited to the 2011 College Basketball Invitational where they advanced to the best-of-three finals against Oregon and former head coach Dana Altman, losing the series in three games.

== Offseason ==
=== Departures ===
Name	Number	Pos.	Height	Weight	Year	Hometown	Notes
Justin Carter	1	F	6'4"	200	Senior	Gaithersburg, MD	Graduated, signed with BK Vahostav-SK Zilina
Cavel Witter	3	G	6'0"	168	Senior	Kansas City, MO	Graduated, signed with Barreirense-CEPSA
P'Allen Stinnett	10	G	6'3"	185	Junior	Las Vegas, NV	Graduated
Andrew Bock	12	G	6'1"	174	Freshman	Rialto, CA	Transferred to Pacific
Chad Millard	13	F	6'8"	225	Senior	Goffstown, NH	Graduated

=== 2010 recruiting class ===
College recruiting information
Name	Hometown	School	Height	Weight	Commit date
Will Artino; F	Waukee, IA	Waukee	6 ft 11 in (2.11 m)	200 lb (91 kg)	Aug 4, 2009
Will Artino; F	Recruit ratings: Rivals: ESPN:				
Jahenns Manigat; G	Ottawa, ON	Ames	6 ft 2 in (1.88 m)	160 lb (73 kg)	Apr 20, 2010
Jahenns Manigat; G	Recruit ratings: ESPN:				
Doug McDermott; SF	Ames, IA	Ames	6 ft 8 in (2.03 m)	225 lb (102 kg)	Apr 29, 2010
Doug McDermott; SF	Recruit ratings: Rivals: 247Sports: ESPN:				
Overall recruit ranking:
Note: In many cases, Scout, Rivals, 247Sports, On3, and ESPN may conflict in their listings of height and weight.; In these cases, the average was taken. ESPN grades are on a 100-point scale.; Sources: "2010 Team Ranking". Rivals.

== Roster ==
2010–11 Creighton Bluejays men's basketball team
Players
Coaches

Pos.	#	Name	Height	Weight	Year	Previous school	Hometown
G	00	Gregory Echenique	6 ft 10 in (2.08 m)	270 lb (122 kg)	So	St. Benedict's Preparatory School; Rutgers	Guatire, Venezuela
G	2	Taylor Stormberg	6 ft 0 in (1.83 m)	190 lb (86 kg)	RS Fr	Creighton Prep	Omaha, NE
F	3	Doug McDermott	6 ft 7 in (2.01 m)	210 lb (95 kg)	Fr	Ames	Ames, IA
G	5	Josh Jones	6 ft 2 in (1.88 m)	195 lb (88 kg)	So	Central	Omaha, NE
G	10	Grant Gibbs	6 ft 4 in (1.93 m)	215 lb (98 kg)	So	Linn-Mar High School; Gonzaga	Marion, IA
G/F	11	Derek Sebastian	6 ft 5 in (1.96 m)	200 lb (91 kg)	So	Thompson Valley	Loveland, CO
G/F	12	Jahenns Manigat	6 ft 1 in (1.85 m)	175 lb (79 kg)	Fr	Regional Elite Development Academy	Ottawa, Ontario
G	13	Ross Ferrarini (W)	6 ft 3 in (1.91 m)	195 lb (88 kg)	So	Westside	Omaha, NE
G	15	Kaleb Korver	6 ft 5 in (1.96 m)	195 lb (88 kg)	Sr	Pella	Pella, IA
F	20	Matthew Dorwart	6 ft 8 in (2.03 m)	200 lb (91 kg)	So	Sidney	Sidney, NE
F	23	Wayne Runnels	6 ft 6 in (1.98 m)	215 lb (98 kg)	Sr	Watonga; Northern Oklahoma-Enid	Watonga, OK
G/F	24	Darryl Ashford	6 ft 4 in (1.93 m)	210 lb (95 kg)	Sr	Cypress Falls; Jacksonville Junior College	Houston, TX
C	25	Kenny Lawson Jr.	6 ft 9 in (2.06 m)	250 lb (113 kg)	Sr	Vista	Oceanside, CA
G	30	Antoine Young	6 ft 0 in (1.83 m)	180 lb (82 kg)	Jr	Bellevue West	Bellevue, NE
C	31	Will Artino (redshirt)	6 ft 11 in (2.11 m)	230 lb (104 kg)	Fr	Waukee	Waukee, IA
F	32	Casey Harriman	6 ft 5 in (1.96 m)	220 lb (100 kg)	Sr	Battle Creek-Ida Grove	Ida Grove, IA
F	34	Ethan Wragge	6 ft 7 in (2.01 m)	220 lb (100 kg)	So	Eden Prairie	Eden Prairie, MN

Head coach

- Greg McDermott (Northern Iowa)

Assistant coach(es)

- Darian DeVries (Northern Iowa)
- Steve Lutz (Texas Lutheran)
- Steve Merfeld (UW–La Crosse)

Legend

- (C) Team captain
- (S) Suspended
- (I) Ineligible
- (W) Walk-on
- Injured
- Current redshirt

Roster
Last update: 5/25/2021

== Schedule ==
Date time, TV	Rank^{#}	Opponent^{#}	Result	Record	Site (attendance) city, state
Exhibition
11/04/2010*; 7:00 pm		Northern State	W 79–67	–	Qwest Center Omaha (14,251); Omaha, NE
Regular season
11/12/2010*; 7:00 pm		Alabama State; Global Sports Hy-Vee Challenge	W 71–57	1–0	Qwest Center Omaha (15,141); Omaha, NE
11/14/2010*; 1:00 pm		Northern Arizona; Global Sports Hy-Vee Challenge	W 74–70	2–0	Qwest Center Omaha (15,147); Omaha, NE
11/17/2010*; 7:00 pm		Louisiana–Lafayette	W 63–58	3–0	Qwest Center Omaha (14,109); Omaha, NE
11/21/2010*; 2:00 pm		vs. Iowa State; Global Sports Hy-Vee Challenge	L 88–91	3–1	Wells Fargo Arena (10,252); Des Moines, IA
11/26/2010*; 7:00 pm		Kennesaw State; Global Sports Hy-Vee Challenge	W 75–57	4–1	Qwest Center Omaha (14,313); Omaha, NE
11/28/2010*; 7:30 pm, BTN		at Northwestern	L 52–65	4–2	Welsh-Ryan Arena (3,819); Evanston, IL
12/01/2010*; 7:30 pm, KMTV		No. 21 BYU; MWC–MVC Challenge	L 65–77	4–3	Qwest Center Omaha (15,532); Omaha, NE
12/05/2010*; 1:00 pm, FSMW		at Nebraska; Rivalry	L 54–59	4–4	Bob Devaney Sports Center (9,824); Lincoln, NE
12/11/2010*; 7:00 pm, KMTV		Saint Joseph's	W 82–75	5–4	Qwest Center Omaha (14,345); Omaha, NE
12/18/2010*; 7:00 pm, KMTV		Idaho State	W 66–60	6–4	Qwest Center Omaha (15,689); Omaha, NE
12/20/2010*; 8:00 pm		Western Illinois	W 60–47	7–4	Qwest Center Omaha (13,864); Omaha, NE
12/22/2010*; 8:00 pm		Samford	W 58–40	8–4	Qwest Center Omaha (16,550); Omaha, NE
12/29/2010; 7:00 pm, KMTV		at Illinois State	W 64–53	9–4 (1–0)	Redbird Arena (6,158); Normal, IL
01/01/2011; 7:00 pm		Drake	W 73–57	10–4 (2–0)	Qwest Center Omaha (15,271); Omaha, NE
01/04/2011; 7:00 pm, FSN		Missouri State	L 55–67	10–5 (2–1)	Qwest Center Omaha (14,920); Omaha, NE
01/07/2011; 7:00 pm, KMTV		at Southern Illinois	W 72–66 ^{OT}	11–5 (3–1)	SIU Arena (5,897); Carbondale, IL
01/09/2011; 3:30 pm		at Evansville	W 74–69	12–5 (4–1)	Roberts Municipal Stadium (4,379); Evansville, IN
01/12/2011; 7:00 pm, KMTV		Wichita State	L 54–68	12–6 (4–2)	Qwest Center Omaha (15,481); Omaha, NE
01/16/2011; 12:00 pm, FSN		at Indiana State	L 59–61	12–7 (4–3)	Hulman Center (6,080); Terre Haute, IN
01/19/2011; 7:00 pm, NET		Bradley	W 81–68	13–7 (5–3)	Qwest Center Omaha (14,502); Omaha, NE
01/22/2011; 4:00 pm, ESPN2		at Missouri State	L 66–67	13–8 (5–4)	JQH Arena (10,655); Springfield, MO
01/26/2011; 8:00 pm, ESPNU		at Northern Iowa	L 66–71	13–9 (5–5)	McLeod Center (6,415); Cedar Falls, IA
01/29/2011; 2:00 pm, KMTV		Indiana State	W 83–69	14–9 (6–5)	Qwest Center Omaha (16,044); Omaha, NE
02/01/2011; 3:00 pm, KMTV		at Bradley	L 61–69	14–10 (6–6)	Carver Arena (8,091); Peoria, IL
02/05/2011; 2:00 pm, NET		Evansville	W 75-69	15–10 (7–6)	Qwest Center Omaha (4,552); Omaha, NE
02/08/2011; 7:00 pm, Mediacom		at Drake	L 64–67	15–11 (7–7)	Knapp Center (4,552); Des Moines, IA
02/13/2011; 7:00 pm, ESPNU		Southern Illinois	W 69–50	16–11 (8–7)	Qwest Center Omaha (14,417); Omaha, NE
02/16/2011; 7:00 pm, NET		Illinois State	W 75–59	17–11 (9–7)	Qwest Center Omaha (14,702); Omaha, NE
02/19/2011*; 6:00 pm		at Akron; ESPN BracketBusters	L 67–76	17–12	James A. Rhodes Arena (2,861); Akron, OH
02/23/2011; 7:00 pm, FSN		at Wichita State	L 65–67	17–13 (9–8)	Charles Koch Arena (10,506); Wichita, KS
02/26/2011; 1:30 pm, FSN		Northern Iowa	W 63–55	18–13 (10–8)	Qwest Center Omaha (15,593); Omaha, NE
Missouri Valley Conference Basketball tournament
03/04/2011; 2:30 pm, MVCTV	(5)	vs. (4) Northern Iowa; Quarterfinals	W 60–57	19–13	Scottrade Center (10,608); St. Louis, MO
03/05/2011; 1:35 pm, MVCTV	(5)	vs. (1) Missouri State; Semifinals	L 50–60	19–14	Scottrade Center (13,533); St. Louis, MO
College Basketball Invitational
03/15/2011*; 7:00 pm, HDNet		San Jose State; First Round	W 85–74	20–14	Qwest Center Omaha (3,086); Omaha, NE
03/21/2011*; 7:00 pm, HDNet		Davidson; Quarterfinals	W 102–92	21–14	Qwest Center Omaha (4,832); Omaha, NE
03/23/2011*; 7:00 pm, HDNet		UCF; Semifinals	W 82–64	22–14	Qwest Center Omaha (6,392); Omaha, NE
03/28/2011*; 7:00 pm, HDNet		Oregon; Finals–Game 1	W 84–76	23–14	Qwest Center Omaha (12,381); Omaha, NE
03/30/2011*; 9:00 pm, HDNet		at Oregon; Finals–Game 2	L 58–71	23–15	Matthew Knight Arena (7,875); Eugene, OR
04/01/2011*; 9:00 pm, HDNet		at Oregon; Finals–Game 3	L 69–71	23–16	Matthew Knight Arena (9,335); Eugene, OR
*Non-conference game. ^{#}Rankings from AP Poll. (#) Tournament seedings in parentheses. All times are in Central Time.
