= 2011 National Invitation Tournament =

Annual NCAA basketball competition

- Season: 2010–11
- Teams: 32
- Finals site: Madison Square Garden, New York City
- Champions: Wichita State Shockers (1st title)
- Runner-up: Alabama Crimson Tide (2nd title game)
- Semifinalists: Colorado Buffaloes (4th semifinal); Washington State Cougars (1st semifinal)
- Winning coach: Gregg Marshall (1st title)
- MVP: Graham Hatch (Wichita State)

The 2011 National Invitation Tournament was a single-elimination tournament of 32 NCAA Division I teams that were not selected to participate in the 2011 NCAA tournament. The 74th annual tournament began March 15 on campus sites ended on March 31 at Madison Square Garden in New York City.

Wichita State defeated Alabama, 66–57, to win its first NIT title.

== Participants ==
=== Automatic qualifiers ===
The following teams are automatic qualifiers for the 2011 NIT field; by virtue of winning their conferences' regular season championship and not qualifying for the NCAA tournament as an "at-large" bid.

Team	Conference	Record	Appearance	Last bid
Bethune–Cookman	MEAC	21–12	1st	Never
Coastal Carolina	Big South	28–5	2nd	2010
College of Charleston	Southern	24–10	4th	2003
Fairfield	MAAC	24–7	6th	2003
Florida Atlantic	Sun Belt	21–10	1st	Never
Kent State	MAC	23–11	9th	2010
Long Beach State	Big West	22–11	6th	2000
McNeese State	Southland	21–11	3rd	2001
Milwaukee	Horizon	19–13	2nd	2004
Missouri State	Missouri Valley	25–8	9th	2007
Murray State	Ohio Valley	23–8	7th	1996
Saint Mary's	West Coast	25–8	2nd	2009
Texas Southern	SWAC	19–12	1st	Never
Vermont	America East	23–8	2nd	2007

=== At-large bids ===
The following 18 teams were also awarded NIT berths.

Team	Conference	Record	Appearance	Last bid
Alabama	SEC	21–11	11th	2007
Boston College	ACC	20–12	11th	2003
California	Pac-10	17–14	7th	2008
Cleveland State	Horizon	26–8	4th	2008
Colorado	Big 12	21–13	9th	2006
Colorado State	Mountain West	19–12	7th	1999
Dayton	Atlantic 10	22–13	23rd	2010
Harvard	Ivy	23–6	1st	Never
Miami (FL)	ACC	19–14	10th	2009
Nebraska	Big 12	19–12	17th	2009
New Mexico	Mountain West	21–12	19th	2009
Northwestern	Big Ten	18–13	6th	2010
Oklahoma State	Big 12	19–13	11th	2008
Ole Miss	SEC	20–13	10th	2010
UTEP	C-USA	25–9	9th	2006
Virginia Tech	ACC	21–11	12th	2010
Washington State	Pac-10	19–12	5th	2009
Wichita State	Missouri Valley	24–8	12th	2010

=== Seeds ===
Alabama Bracket
Seed	School	Conference	Record	Berth type
1	Alabama	SEC	21–11	At-large
2	Miami (FL)	ACC	19–14	At-large
3	Missouri State	Missouri Valley	25–8	Automatic
4	New Mexico	Mountain West	21–12	At-large
5	UTEP	C-USA	25–9	At-large
6	Murray State	Ohio Valley	23–8	Automatic
7	Florida Atlantic	Sun Belt	21–10	Automatic
8	Coastal Carolina	Big South	28–5	Automatic

Boston College Bracket
Seed	School	Conference	Record	Berth type
1	Boston College	ACC	20–12	At-large
2	Washington State	Pac-10	19–12	At-large
3	Oklahoma State	Big 12	19–13	At-large
4	Northwestern	Big Ten	18–13	At-large
5	Milwaukee	Horizon	19–13	Automatic
6	Harvard	Ivy	23–6	At-large
7	Long Beach State	Big West	22–11	Automatic
8	McNeese State	Southland	21–11	Automatic

Colorado Bracket
Seed	School	Conference	Record	Berth type
1	Colorado	Big 12	21–13	At-large
2	Saint Mary's	West Coast	25–8	Automatic
3	Colorado State	Mountain West	19–12	At-large
4	California	Pac-10	17–14	At-large
5	Ole Miss	SEC	20–13	At-large
6	Fairfield	MAAC	24–7	Automatic
7	Kent State	MAC	23–11	Automatic
8	Texas Southern	SWAC	19–12	Automatic

Virginia Tech Bracket
Seed	School	Conference	Record	Berth type
1	Virginia Tech	ACC	21–11	At-large
2	Cleveland State	Horizon	26–8	At-large
3	Dayton	Atlantic 10	22–13	At-large
4	Wichita State	Missouri Valley	24–8	At-large
5	Nebraska	Big 12	19–12	At-large
6	College of Charleston	SoCon	24–10	Automatic
7	Vermont	America East	23–8	Automatic
8	Bethune–Cookman	MEAC	21–12	Automatic

== Bracket ==
Played on the home court of the higher-seeded team
(except #1 Boston College & #3 Dayton in the first round)
* – Denotes overtime

=== Alabama bracket ===
First round March 15–16
1	Alabama	68
8	Coastal Carolina	44
4	New Mexico	69
5	UTEP	57
3	Missouri State	89
6	Murray State	76
2	Miami (FL)	85
7	Florida Atlantic	62

Second round March 18–21
1	Alabama	74
4	New Mexico	67
3	Missouri State	72
2	Miami (FL)	81

Quarterfinals; March 23
1	Alabama	79
2	Miami (FL)	64

=== Colorado bracket ===
First round March 15–16
1	Colorado	88
8	Texas Southern	74
4	California	77
5	Ole Miss	74
3	Colorado State	60
6	Fairfield	62
2	Saint Mary's	70
7	Kent State	71

Second round March 18–21
1	Colorado	89
4	California	72
6	Fairfield	68
7	Kent State	72

Quarterfinals; March 22
1	Colorado	81
7	Kent State	74

=== Boston College bracket ===
First round March 15–16
1	Boston College	82
8	McNeese State	64
4	Northwestern	70
5	Milwaukee	61
3	Oklahoma State	71
6	Harvard	54
2	Washington State	85
7	Long Beach State	74

Second round March 18–21
1	Boston College	67
4	Northwestern	85
3	Oklahoma State	64
2	Washington State	74

Quarterfinals; March 23
4	Northwestern	66
2	Washington State	69*

=== Virginia Tech bracket ===
First round March 15–16
1	Virginia Tech	79
8	Bethune–Cookman	54
4	Wichita State	76
5	Nebraska	49
3	Dayton	84
6	College of Charleston	94
2	Cleveland State	63
7	Vermont	60

Second round March 18–21
1	Virginia Tech	76
4	Wichita State	79*
6	College of Charleston	64
2	Cleveland State	56

Quarterfinals; March 23
4	Wichita State	82
6	College of Charleston	75

=== NIT Final Four ===
Played at Madison Square Garden in New York City

Semifinals; March 29
1	Alabama	62
1	Colorado	61
2	Washington State	44
4	Wichita State	75

Championship; March 31
1	Alabama	57
4	Wichita State	66

== See also ==
- 2011 Women's National Invitation Tournament
- 2011 NCAA Division I men's basketball tournament
- 2011 NCAA Division II men's basketball tournament
- 2011 NCAA Division III men's basketball tournament
- 2011 NCAA Division I women's basketball tournament
- 2011 NCAA Division II women's basketball tournament
- 2011 NAIA Division I men's basketball tournament
- 2011 NAIA Division II men's basketball tournament
- 2011 College Basketball Invitational
- 2011 CollegeInsider.com Postseason Tournament
