= Old National Events Plaza =

Convention center in Indiana, US

Coordinates: 37.9725°N 87.5656°W

The Old National Events Plaza
- Interactive map of The Old National Events Plaza
- Location: Evansville, Indiana
- Owner: City of Evansville
- Operator: VenuWorks
- Capacity: 2,500 (auditorium); 4,000 (convention center)
- Public transit: METS

The Old National Events Plaza (formerly The Centre) is a 280,000-square-foot (26,000 m^{2}) convention center and auditorium in Evansville, Indiana, United States, that consists of a 2,500-seat auditorium, a 38,000-square-foot (3,500 m^{2}) exhibit hall, 14,000-square-foot (1,300 m^{2}) ballroom, and 12 flexible 1,000-square-foot (93 m^{2}) meeting rooms.

The facility hosts small and medium-sized conventions ranging from 20 to 4,000 people. The auditorium is also frequently the site a variety of concerts and special events. Formerly known as Vanderburgh Auditorium, the building underwent a major renovation and expansion in the mid-1990s and was renamed the centre. The architects involved with the project included HOK Venue and Veazey Parrot & Shoulders.

It is co-managed with the Ford Center, Mesker Amphitheatre, and Victory Theatre.
