= Jake Odum =

American basketball player

Indiana State Sycamores
- Position: Assistant coach
- League: Missouri Valley Conference

Personal information
- Born: February 11, 1991 (age 35) Terre Haute, Indiana, U.S.
- Listed height: 6 ft 4 in (1.93 m)
- Listed weight: 180 lb (82 kg)

Career information
- High school: South Vigo (Terre Haute, Indiana)
- College: Indiana State (2010–2014)
- NBA draft: 2014: undrafted
- Playing career: 2014–2019

Career history

Playing
- 2014–2015: PAOK
- 2015–2016: Medi Bayreuth
- 2016–2017: s.Oliver Würzburg
- 2017: Banvit
- 2017–2018: Nizhny Novgorod
- 2018–2019: Promitheas Patras
- 2019: Pistoia Basket 2000

Coaching
- 2019–2021: Indiana State (assistant)
- 2021–2024: Coffeyville (assistant)
- 2024-present: Indiana State (assistant)

Career highlights
- 2× First-team All-MVC (2013, 2014)
- Stats at Basketball Reference

Jacob Andrew Odum (born February 11, 1991) is an American basketball coach and former player who is an assistant coach for the Indiana State Sycamores. He played professionally as a point guard-shooting guard.

== College career ==
Odum played college basketball at Indiana State University, with the Sycamores, from 2010 to 2014. He led the Sycamores to a 4-yr record of 79–55 (.590), a MVC ArchMadness title and 4 post-season tournament berths (1x NCAA, 2x NIT, 1x CiT).

He currently stands 6th in career scoring (1,568 pts), 13th in career rebounds (617), 2nd in assists (603), 3rd in steals (204), 1st in games played (134), made free throws (590), games started (131) and minutes played (4,199).

== Professional career ==
After going undrafted in the 2014 NBA draft, Odum played on the Indiana Pacers' Orlando Summer League team. He then played on the Sacramento Kings' Las Vegas Summer League team.

Odum began his pro career with the Greek League club PAOK for the 2014–15 season, choosing to sign with the Greek club, rather than take his chances at that particular time in an NBA training camp, despite a couple of offers from NBA teams.

After leading PAOK to a 3rd-place finish in the Greek League, Odum signed with Medi Bayreuth of Germany for the 2015–16 Bundesliga season. He was named to the Eurobasket.com German Bundesliga All-Newcomer Team. Odum was one of the best players of the team and was then committed by the Franconian rival s.Oliver Würzburg for the 2016–17 Bundesliga season. He was named to the EuroBasket.com All-German Bundesliga Honorable Mention team.

On July 13, 2017, Odum signed with Turkish club Banvit. On November 17, 2017, he left Banvit and signed with Russian club Nizhny Novgorod for the rest of the 2017–18 season.

On November 13, 2017, Odum signed with Promitheas Patras B.C. in Greece. On March 4, 2019, Odum left Promitheas Patras and signed with Pistoia Basket 2000 in Italy.

== Coaching career ==
Odum joined Indiana State as assistant director of player personnel and assistant strength coach in 2019. In September 2020, he was promoted to assistant coach. Following the termination of Head Coach Greg Lansing in March, 2021; Odum was released with the entirety of Lansing's staff.

From 2021 to 2024 Odum served as an assistant coach at Coffeyville Community College in Coffeyville, Kansas.

Odum returned to Terre Haute for a second stint and was announced as an assistant coach for Indiana State by head coach Matthew Graves on May 13, 2024.

== Awards and accomplishments ==
=== College ===
Portsmouth Invitational Tournament (2014) Under Armour All-Select Tournament Team

- 2× All-Missouri Valley Conference First Team: (2014, 2013)
- 2× Missouri Valley Conference tournament All-Tournament Team: (2014), (2011)
- NABC All-District 16 First Team: (2013)
- NABC All-District 16 Second Team: (2012)
- All-Missouri Valley Conference Second Team: (2012)
- Diamond Head Classic All-Tournament Team: (2012)
- Old Spice Classic All-Tournament Team (2011) – to date, Odum is the only player in Old Spice Classic history to achieve a "Triple-Double" (10 points, 10 rebounds, 12 assists)
- Missouri Valley Conference All-Freshman Team: (2011)
- Missouri Valley Conference All-Newcomer Team: (2011)
- Missouri Valley Conference All-Defensive Team: (2011)
- Missouri Valley Conference Honorable Mention: (2011)
