= Doug McDermott =

American basketball player (born 1992)

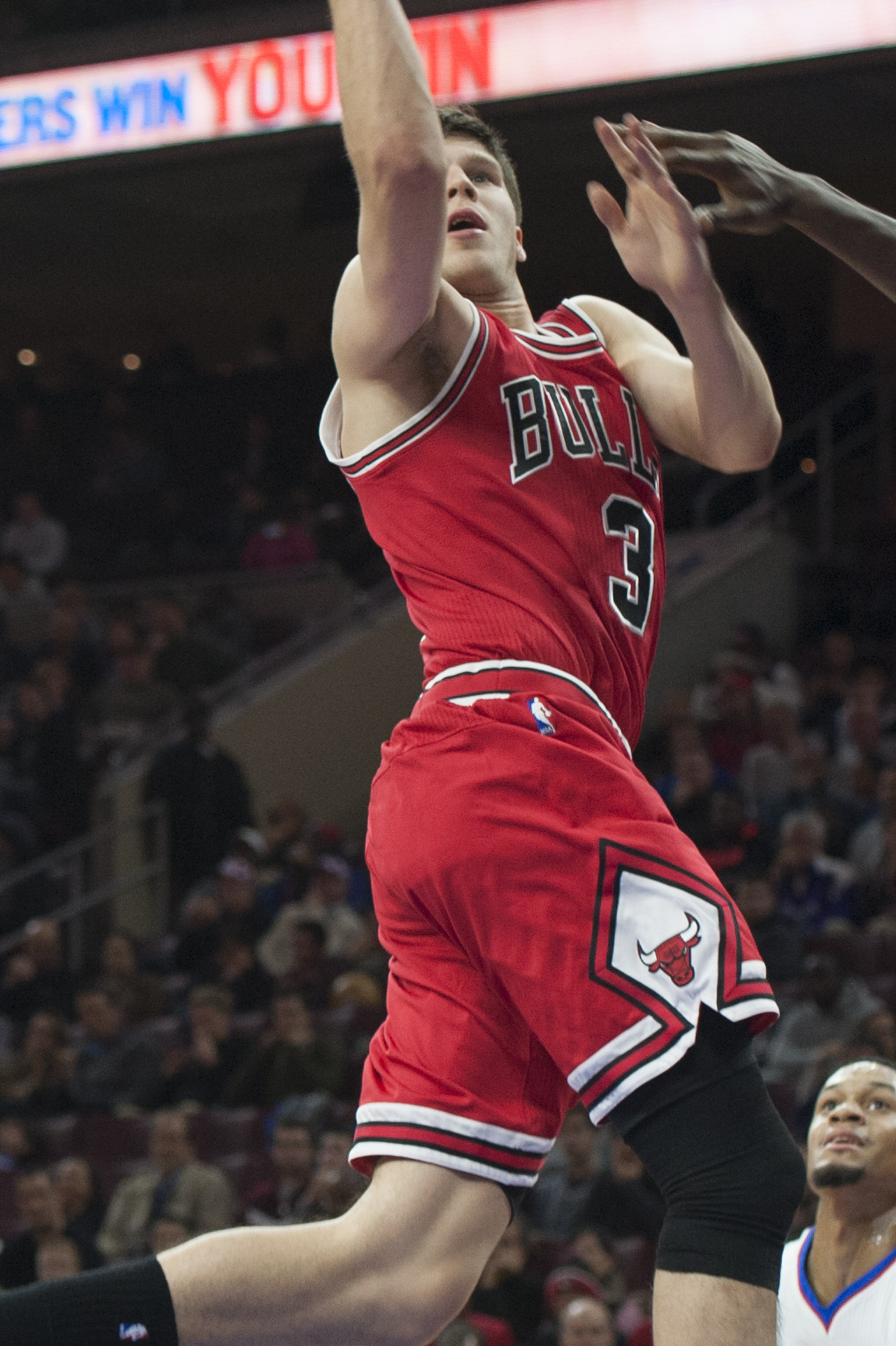
- McDermott with the Chicago Bulls in 2014

Personal information
- Born: January 3, 1992 (age 34) Grand Forks, North Dakota, U.S.
- Listed height: 6 ft 7 in (2.01 m)
- Listed weight: 225 lb (102 kg)

Career information
- High school: Ames (Ames, Iowa)
- College: Creighton (2010–2014)
- NBA draft: 2014: 1st round, 11th overall pick
- Drafted by: Denver Nuggets
- Playing career: 2014–2026
- Position: Small forward / power forward
- Number: 3, 11, 25, 20, 17, 7

Career history
- 2014–2017: Chicago Bulls
- 2017: Oklahoma City Thunder
- 2017–2018: New York Knicks
- 2018: Dallas Mavericks
- 2018–2021: Indiana Pacers
- 2021–2024: San Antonio Spurs
- 2024: Indiana Pacers
- 2024–2026: Sacramento Kings

Career highlights
- National college player of the year (2014); 3× Consensus first-team All-American (2012–2014); 2× Lute Olson Award (2012, 2014); NCAA scoring champion (2014); 2× MVC Player of the Year (2012, 2013); Big East Player of the Year (2014); 3× First-team All-MVC (2011–2013); First-team All-Big East (2014); 2× MVC tournament MVP (2012, 2013); No. 3 retired by Creighton Bluejays

Career statistics
- Points: 6,162 (8.5 ppg)
- Rebounds: 1,493 (2.1 rpg)
- Assists: 686 (0.9 apg)
- Stats at NBA.com
- Stats at Basketball Reference

Douglas Richard McDermott (born January 3, 1992) is an American former professional basketball player. While playing college basketball for the Creighton Bluejays, McDermott led the nation in scoring in 2013–14 and was a three-time consensus first-team All-American. He was the consensus national player of the year as a senior in 2014, and finished his college career with the fifth-most points in NCAA Division I men's basketball history.

After graduating from Creighton, McDermott was selected by the Denver Nuggets with the 11th overall pick in the 2014 NBA draft. He was traded to the Chicago Bulls and went on to play two and a half seasons for the Bulls before being traded to the Oklahoma City Thunder in February 2017. McDermott has also played for the New York Knicks, the Dallas Mavericks, the Indiana Pacers, the San Antonio Spurs, and the Sacramento Kings. A small forward, McDermott is known for his outside shooting.

McDermott is the son of Creighton coach Greg McDermott and was coached by his father during his college career.

== High school career ==
McDermott was born in Grand Forks, North Dakota, where his father was an assistant coach for the University of North Dakota Fighting Sioux men's basketball team. After his father took the head coaching job at Iowa State University in Ames, Iowa, McDermott played high school basketball from 2006 to 2010 at Ames High School. A 6'7", 225-pound forward playing alongside high school All-American forward Harrison Barnes, the two helped the Ames Little Cyclones win 53 consecutive games and two Iowa state titles during their junior and senior seasons, As a senior, McDermott averaged 20.1 points and 7.8 rebounds per game and was named first team All-State.

Considered a three-star recruit by ESPN.com, McDermott was listed as the number 28 small forward in the nation in 2010.

== College career ==
Originally, McDermott signed a National Letter of Intent to play with Northern Iowa, but after his father moved from coaching Iowa State to Creighton, he was released from his commitment in order to play for his father.

As a freshman at Creighton in 2010–11, McDermott averaged 14.9 points and 7.2 rebounds per game as he started all 39 games for the Bluejays. McDermott set a Missouri Valley Conference (MVC) record for points by a freshman (581) and was named conference freshman and newcomer of the year. McDermott also became the first player to earn first team all-conference honors as a freshman since Cleo Littleton of Wichita State in 1954. McDermott led the Bluejays to the 2011 College Basketball Invitational, where they made it to the best of three final series, ultimately losing to Oregon.

Prior to his sophomore season, McDermott was named to the preseason watch lists for the Wooden Award and Naismith Award.

As a sophomore, McDermott was one of five men named first team All-America for the 2011–12 season. McDermott is Creighton's first player honored by the NABC on its first-team All-America squad. McDermott also was named the Missouri Valley Conference Player of the Year, the first Creighton player since Booker Woodfox in 2009. McDermott finished his 2011–12 season averaging 22.9 points per game, a figure that ranked third nationally. His 801 points, 307 field goals, and 48.6 percent shooting accuracy from three-point range were all school records for a single season. Creighton finished 29–6 and advanced to the Third Round (now Second Round) of the NCAA tournament. On March 26, 2012, McDermott was named a first-team AP All-American.

As a junior in 2012–13, McDermott ranked first in the nation in points scored and second in points per game. He set school records for points in a single season and in a career. He was again named a first-team All-American by the AP.

On April 25, 2013, McDermott announced he would be returning to Creighton for his senior season and would not enter the 2013 NBA draft. That July, he relinquished his scholarship and became a walk-on for his final season at Creighton. This came about after the NCAA had granted senior guard Grant Gibbs, who had missed full seasons at both Gonzaga and Creighton with injuries, a rare sixth year of eligibility, putting Creighton over the NCAA's limit of 13 scholarships for the 2013–14 season.

On February 28, 2014, McDermott was named one of the 10 semi-finalists for Naismith College Player of the Year. On Senior Night against Providence, he scored a career-high 45 points and passed the 3,000 point threshold. McDermott was named first-team All-Big East in Creighton's first season in the league. He won the Big East Player of the Year award, as well as earning First-Team All-American honors by U.S. Basketball Writers Association for the third time. McDermott was also the consensus national player of the year, winning all major awards (Wooden, Naismith, AP, NABC, USBWA, and Sporting News).

McDermott led the nation in scoring at 26.7 points per game. At the end of his college career, he ranked fifth on the all-time NCAA Division I scoring list, with 3,150 points, which passed basketball Hall of Famer Larry Bird. He became the first player in 29 years to be named to the AP All-America first team three times. McDermott is one of three players in NCAA men's basketball history to record 3,000 points and 1,000 rebounds. He also set an NCAA record by scoring in double figures in 135 games.

== Professional career ==
=== Chicago Bulls (2014–2017) ===
==== 2014–15 season ====
On June 26, 2014, McDermott was selected in the first round with the 11th overall pick in the 2014 NBA draft by the Denver Nuggets. He was later traded to the Chicago Bulls on draft night, along with Anthony Randolph, for both of Chicago's 2014 first-round picks (Jusuf Nurkic 16th and Gary Harris 19th) and a future second-round pick. On July 22, 2014, he signed his rookie scale contract with the Bulls after averaging 18.0 points, 4.0 rebounds and 2.8 assists per game during the 2014 NBA Summer League. In his NBA debut on October 29, he recorded 12 points, 5 rebounds, 2 assists and 1 steal in a 104–80 win over the New York Knicks.

While expected to contribute with scoring and shooting for the Bulls, McDermott struggled significantly over his first 17 games, averaging just 3.2 points on 42.3 percent shooting. Despite his promising debut, McDermott did not manage to eclipse 12 points before being ruled out indefinitely on December 1 due to a knee injury. He subsequently required an arthroscopic procedure on his right knee which took place on December 13. He returned to action on January 22, 2015, against the San Antonio Spurs, recording no stats in two minutes of action. On March 6, he scored a season-high 16 points in a loss to the Indiana Pacers.

==== 2015–16 season ====
In July 2015, McDermott re-joined the Bulls for the 2015 NBA Summer League, where he averaged 18.8 points and 4.4 rebounds in five games, impressing new head coach Fred Hoiberg. On October 30, the Bulls exercised their third-year team option on McDermott's rookie scale contract, extending the contract through the 2016–17 season.

McDermott's Summer League form carried over into the regular season, with Hoiberg giving him plenty of game time off the bench. His impressive play off the bench earned him his first career starting assignment on November 5 against the Oklahoma City Thunder. In 23 minutes of action as the starting small forward, he scored nine points in a 104–98 win over the Thunder. On November 16, Tony Snell was reinserted into the starting line-up, moving McDermott back to a bench role. On February 19, 2016, McDermott scored a career-high 30 points off the bench in a 116–106 win over the Toronto Raptors. On March 14, he had his second 20+ point game of the season with a team-high 29 points off the bench in a 109–107 win over the Toronto Raptors. Three days later, he scored 25 points against the Brooklyn Nets for his third straight game with 20+ points, tying a career-high with five three-pointers.

==== 2016–17 season ====
On October 28, 2016, the Bulls exercised their fourth-year team option on McDermott's rookie scale contract, extending the contract through the 2017–18 season. Among other moves that offseason, the Bulls also acquired Chicago native Dwyane Wade, for whom McDermott switched from No. 3 to No. 11 for the 2016–17 season. In the Bulls' second game of the season, McDermott scored a game-high 23 points off the bench in a 118–101 win over the Indiana Pacers. He received a concussion on October 31 against the Brooklyn Nets and entered concussion protocol; on November 12, he suffered another concussion against the Washington Wizards. As a result, McDermott missed the next nine games, and on December 5, he was assigned to the Windy City Bulls of the NBA Development League for conditioning. He was recalled two days later and made his return to Chicago's line-up on December 8, scoring eight points in a 95–91 win over the San Antonio Spurs.

On January 7, 2017, McDermott recorded his first-career double-double, grabbing a career-high 10 rebounds to go with 17 points in a 123–118 win over the Toronto Raptors. On January 15, 2017, he scored a career-high 31 points in a 108–104 win over the Memphis Grizzlies.

=== Oklahoma City Thunder (2017) ===
On February 23, 2017, McDermott was traded, along with Taj Gibson and an unprotected 2018 second round draft pick, to the Oklahoma City Thunder in exchange for Joffrey Lauvergne, Anthony Morrow and Cameron Payne. On March 18, 2017, McDermott had his highest-scoring game with the Thunder, going 8 of 9 from the field, including 4 of 5 from three-point range, to finish with 21 points in a 110–94 win over the Sacramento Kings.

=== New York Knicks (2017–2018) ===
On September 25, 2017, McDermott was traded, along with Enes Kanter and a 2018 second-round pick, to the New York Knicks in exchange for Carmelo Anthony. In his debut for the Knicks in their season opener on October 19, 2017, McDermott scored four points on 2-for-5 shooting in a 105–84 loss to his former team, the Oklahoma City Thunder.

=== Dallas Mavericks (2018) ===
On February 8, 2018, McDermott was acquired by the Dallas Mavericks in a three-team trade that also involved the Knicks and the Denver Nuggets. In his debut for the Mavericks two days later, McDermott scored eight points in a 130–123 win over the Los Angeles Lakers. He received a qualifying offer from the Mavericks on June 27, 2018, but the offer was later withdrawn.

=== Indiana Pacers (2018–2021) ===
On July 6, 2018, McDermott signed a three-year, $22 million contract with the Indiana Pacers. On November 26, he scored a season-high 21 points in a 121–88 win over the Utah Jazz.

On May 1, 2021, McDermott scored a career-high-tying 31 points, making a season-high six 3-pointers in a 152–95 win over the Oklahoma City Thunder.

=== San Antonio Spurs (2021–2024) ===
On August 8, 2021, McDermott joined the San Antonio Spurs via a sign-and-trade deal in which McDermott agreed to a three-year, $42 million contract. On March 12, 2022, he suffered a right ankle injury in a 108–119 loss to the Indiana Pacers. Four days later, it was announced that the injury was diagnosed as a grade 3 ankle sprain, sidelining McDermott for the remainder of the season.

=== Second stint with Pacers (2024) ===
On February 8, 2024, McDermott was traded back to the Indiana Pacers in a three-team deal, sending Buddy Hield to the Philadelphia 76ers.

=== Sacramento Kings (2024–2026) ===
On October 16, 2024, McDermott signed with the Sacramento Kings.

On July 21, 2025, McDermott re-signed with the Kings on a one-year, $3.6 million contract.

On November 13, 2026, McDermott announced his retirement from professional basketball.

== National team career ==
Following the close of his freshman year at Creighton, McDermott was selected to the U.S. team sent to Riga, Latvia for the 2011 FIBA Under-19 World Championship. McDermott started all nine matches and averaged 11.3 points per game on .501 shooting and 6.1 rebounds per contest, good for third on the team in both categories. The United States finished 7–2, good for fifth in the tournament.

On July 22, 2014, McDermott was named to the 2014 USA Select Team.

== Career statistics ==
Legend
GP	Games played	GS	Games started	MPG	Minutes per game
FG%	Field goal percentage	3P%	3-point field goal percentage	FT%	Free throw percentage
RPG	Rebounds per game	APG	Assists per game	SPG	Steals per game
BPG	Blocks per game	PPG	Points per game	**Bold**	Career high

=== NBA ===
==== Regular season ====
Year	Team	GP	GS	MPG	FG%	3P%	FT%	RPG	APG	SPG	BPG	PPG
2014–15	Chicago	36	0	8.9	.402	.317	.667	1.2	.2	.1	.0	3.0
2015–16	Chicago	**81**	4	23.0	.452	.425	.857	2.4	.7	.2	.1	9.4
2016–17	Chicago	44	4	**24.5**	.445	.373	**.881**	3.0	1.0	**.3**	.1	10.2
2016–17	Oklahoma City	22	1	19.5	.452	.362	.706	2.2	.6	.1	.0	6.6
2017–18	New York	55	1	21.3	.460	.387	.755	2.4	.9	.2	**.2**	7.2
2017–18	Dallas	26	3	22.9	.478	**.494**	.857	2.5	1.1	**.3**	**.2**	9.0
2018–19	Indiana	77	1	17.4	.491	.408	.835	1.4	.9	.2	.1	7.3
2019–20	Indiana	69	0	19.9	.488	.435	.828	2.5	1.1	.2	.1	10.3
2020–21	Indiana	66	29	**24.5**	**.532**	.388	.816	**3.3**	1.3	**.3**	.1	**13.6**
2021–22	San Antonio	51	**51**	24.0	.462	.422	.784	2.3	1.3	**.3**	.1	11.3
2022–23	San Antonio	64	0	20.5	.457	.413	.757	2.2	**1.4**	.2	.1	10.2
2023–24	San Antonio	46	0	15.2	.442	.439	.588	1.0	1.2	.2	.0	6.0
2023–24	Indiana	18	0	11.3	.406	.321	.500	.6	.7	**.3**	.0	4.2
2024–25	Sacramento	42	3	8.1	.427	.436	.600	.5	.2	.1	.0	3.5
2025–26	Sacramento	29	0	15.1	.388	.390	**.889**	1.3	.8	.2	.1	5.7
Career		726	97	19.3	.468	.410	.806	2.1	.9	.2	.1	8.5

==== Playoffs ====
Year	Team	GP	GS	MPG	FG%	3P%	FT%	RPG	APG	SPG	BPG	PPG
2015	Chicago	3	0	3.3	.333	.500	**1.000**	.7	.3	.0	.0	1.7
2017	Oklahoma City	5	0	13.2	**.500**	**.538**	—	1.0	.2	.2	.2	**5.0**
2019	Indiana	3	0	9.7	.200	.000	.500	**1.7**	**1.3**	.0	**.3**	2.0
2020	Indiana	4	0	**13.5**	.267	.200	—	.8	.3	**.3**	.0	2.5
2024	Indiana	**10**	0	6.4	.455	.375	—	.3	.7	.0	.2	1.3
Career		25	0	8.9	.368	.325	.667	.7	.6	.1	.2	2.4

=== College ===
Year	Team	GP	GS	MPG	FG%	3P%	FT%	RPG	APG	SPG	BPG	PPG
2010–11	Creighton	**39**	**39**	29.1	.525	.405	.746	7.2	1.2	**.3**	**.1**	14.9
2011–12	Creighton	35	34	31.9	**.601**	.486	.796	**8.2**	1.1	.2	**.1**	22.9
2012–13	Creighton	36	36	31.6	.548	**.490**	**.875**	7.7	**1.6**	.2	**.1**	23.2
2013–14	Creighton	35	35	**33.7**	.526	.449	.864	7.0	**1.6**	.2	**.1**	**26.7**
Career		145	144	31.5	.550	.458	.831	7.5	1.3	.2	.1	21.7

== See also ==
- List of National Basketball Association career 3-point field goal percentage leaders
- List of NCAA Division I men's basketball season scoring leaders
- List of NCAA Division I men's basketball career scoring leaders
- List of NCAA Division I men's basketball players with 2000 points and 1000 rebounds
