= Greg Lansing =

American college basketball coach (born 1967)

Current position
- Title: Analyst
- Team: Phoenix Suns

Biographical details
- Born: December 9, 1967 (age 58); Mount Pleasant, Iowa, U.S.

Playing career
- 1986–1990: South Dakota
- Position: Guard

Coaching career (HC unless noted)
- 1990–1992: South Dakota (grad. asst.)
- 1992–1993: South Dakota (assistant)
- 1993–1995: Theodore Roosevelt HS (IA)
- 1995–1999: Indiana State (assistant)
- 1999–2006: Iowa (assistant)
- 2006–2007: Indiana State (assistant)
- 2007–2010: Indiana State (assoc. HC)
- 2010–2021: Indiana State
- 2022–2023: Philadelphia 76ers (scout)
- 2023–2024: Arizona State (special assistant to HC)
- 2024–present: Phoenix Suns (analyst)

Head coaching record
- Overall: 181–164 (.525)
- Tournaments: 0–1 (NCAA); 0–2 (NIT); 0–1 (CIT)

Accomplishments and honors

Championships
- MVC tournament (2011)

Awards
- As player: NCC Defensive Player of the Year (1990)

Gregory A. Lansing (born December 9, 1967) is a current special assistant to the head coach at Arizona State. An assistant and head coach at the high school and college levels since 1990, he was most recently the head men's basketball coach at Indiana State University from 2010 to 2021, having twice previously been an assistant coach at Indiana State.

Originally from Harlan, Iowa, Lansing played college basketball at South Dakota and was the North Central Conference Defensive Player of the Year as a senior in 1990. After two years as a graduate assistant there, Lansing was an assistant coach at South Dakota from 1992 to 1993. From 1993 to 1995, Lansing was head coach at Theodore Roosevelt High School in Des Moines, Iowa, where he led the boys' basketball program to its first winning seasons in over a decade. Lansing then returned to the college level as Indiana State assistant coach from 1995 to 1999 during a turnaround where Indiana State had a winning season for the first time in over 15 years. Then from 1999 to 2006, Lansing was an assistant coach at the University of Iowa, where he helped Iowa win the 2001 Big Ten tournament.

After his second stint as an assistant coach at Indiana State from 2006 to 2010, Lansing became head coach at Indiana State. Lansing led Indiana State to a Missouri Valley Conference tournament title in his debut season and subsequently took Indiana State to the 2012 College Basketball Invitational and the National Invitation Tournaments of 2013 and 2014. Those were the only postseason appearances in his time as head coach, and Indiana State declined to renew his contract following the 2020–21 season. With a 181–164 cumulative record in 11 seasons, Lansing has the second most wins among Indiana State head coaches.

== Early life and education ==
Lansing was born in Mount Pleasant, Iowa, where his father Dave was a high school basketball coach. Lansing later grew up in Harlan, Iowa, and attended Harlan Community High School, where he graduated in 1986 and earned all-state honors in baseball (pitcher), basketball, and football (quarterback).

After high school, Lansing attended the University of South Dakota. On the South Dakota Coyotes men's basketball team, Lansing played at guard from 1986 to 1990 under head coach Dave Boots. As a senior in 1989–90, he averaged 3.4 points, 1.2 rebounds, and 2.3 assists and was the North Central Conference Defensive Player of the Year, concluding his college career with one of the highest career assist totals in program history. Lansing was also part of South Dakota teams that appeared in the 1989 and 1990 NCAA Division II Tournaments. Lansing graduated from South Dakota in 1990 with a bachelor's degree in physical education.

== Coaching career ==
=== Early coaching career (1990–2010) ===
After his playing career, Lansing remained at South Dakota from 1990 to 1992 as a graduate assistant under Dave Boots. Lansing completed his master's degree in counseling in 1992 and was promoted to full-time assistant coach that year.

Returning to Iowa, Lansing was head coach at Theodore Roosevelt High School in Des Moines from 1993 to 1995. Lansing led Roosevelt to consecutive winning seasons; the program had 12 straight losing seasons before his hire.

In 1995 under head coach Sherman Dillard, Lansing returned to the college level in the first of multiple stints at Indiana State. Lansing helped Indiana State achieve a 16–11 record in 1997–98, the first of four straight winning seasons and the first winning season since 1980.

After four years at Indiana State, Lansing became an assistant coach at Iowa under Steve Alford. Lansing helped the 2000–01 Iowa team win the Big Ten tournament, advance to the second round of the NCAA tournament, and finish with a year-end no. 24 national ranking. Iowa next appeared in the NCAA Tournament in 2005 and 2006.

Lansing returned to Indiana State to be an assistant again on June 30, 2006, this time under Royce Waltman. He was promoted to associate head coach in 2007 under new head coach Kevin McKenna. The 2009–10 Indiana State team qualified for the 2010 College Basketball Invitational, the first postseason appearance since the 2001 NCAA Tournament.

=== Indiana State head coach (2010–2021) ===
After McKenna resigned to accept an offer to be assistant coach at Oregon, Indiana State promoted Lansing to head coach on June 15, 2010.

In his debut season as head coach, Lansing led Indiana State to a 20–14 record, MVC tournament title, and NCAA tournament automatic berth. He became the second Indiana State rookie head coach to lead the program to the NCAA Tournament, last achieved by Bill Hodges in 1979.

Lansing led the 2011–12 Indiana State team to an 18–15 record and a berth in the 2012 CollegeInsider.com Postseason Tournament. On December 17, 2011, Indiana State upset no. 25 Vanderbilt 61–55.

In the 2012–13 season, Indiana State finished 18–15 and made the 2013 National Invitation Tournament, losing in the first round to Lansing's former team Iowa. The regular season included upsets of ranked Wichita State and Creighton teams.

In 2013–14, Lansing reached a new high in total wins with a 23–11 record. For the third straight season, Indiana State upset a nationally ranked opponent, this time no. 21 Notre Dame on November 17, 2013, by a score of 83–70.

After this initial success, Indiana State had losing records from the 2014–15 to 2018–19 seasons. On December 7, 2016, Lansing set a new school record with a fifth win over a ranked opponent, 72–71 at home over no. 16 Butler; however, Indiana State finished the season 11–20, the worst in Lansing's tenure.

Indiana State opened the 2017–18 season with a 90–69 win at Indiana on November 10, setting new records for margin of victory over Indiana (21 points) and three-pointers made (17) by an opponent at Assembly Hall. The season concluded with a 13–18 record.

For the first time since 1946, Indiana State defeated a Pac-12 Conference opponent on December 22, 2018, with a 72–67 win over Colorado at the 2018 Diamond Head Classic in Hawaii; Indiana State was the runner-up in tournament and improved to 15–16 to end the season.

The 2019–20 team had the first winning record in six years at 18–12 with a third-place finish in the MVC standings. The 2020–21 team had a second straight winning record at 15–10 and finished fourth in the MVC.

On March 8, 2021, Indiana State athletic director Sherard Clinkscales announced that the university would not renew Lansing's contract after its March 31 expiration, citing concern for the "long-term success of the program." Lansing concluded his Indiana State head coaching record with a cumulative 181–164 record, one win short of all-time wins leader Duane Klueh.

== Head coaching record ==
Record table
Season	Team	Overall	Conference	Standing	Postseason
Indiana State Sycamores (Missouri Valley Conference) (2010–2021)
2010–11	Indiana State	20–14	12–6	3rd	NCAA Division I Round of 64
2011–12	Indiana State	18–15	8–10	8th	CIT First Round
2012–13	Indiana State	18–15	9–9	5th	NIT First Round
2013–14	Indiana State	23–11	12–6	2nd	NIT First Round
2014–15	Indiana State	15–16	11–7	T–3rd	
2015–16	Indiana State	15–17	8–10	T–6th	
2016–17	Indiana State	11–20	5–13	T–9th	
2017–18	Indiana State	13–18	8–10	6th	
2018–19	Indiana State	15–16	7–11	T–8th	
2019–20	Indiana State	18–12	11–7	T–3rd	Canceled due to COVID-19
2020–21	Indiana State	15–10	11–7	4th	
Indiana State:		181–164 (.525)	102–96 (.515)		
Total:		181–164 (.525)			
National champion Postseason invitational champion Conference regular season champion Conference regular season and conference tournament champion Division regular season champion Division regular season and conference tournament champion Conference tournament champion
