= 2011 College Basketball Invitational =

College basketball tournament

- Teams: 16
- Finals site: Qwest Center Omaha; Matthew Knight Arena, Omaha, Nebraska; Eugene, Oregon
- Champions: Oregon Ducks (1st title)
- Runner-up: Creighton Bluejays (1st title game)
- Semifinalists: Boise State Broncos (1st semifinal); UCF Knights (1st semifinal)
- Winning coach: Dana Altman (1st title)
- MVP: Joevan Catron (Oregon)

The 2011 College Basketball Invitational (CBI) was a single-elimination tournament of 16 NCAA Division I teams that did not participate in the 2011 NCAA Tournament nor the 2011 National Invitation Tournament. The opening round began Tuesday, March 15. A best-of-three championship series between the two teams in the final was held on March 28, March 30, and April 1.

The tournament was won by Oregon who defeated Creighton in the finals after losing game one but winning the next two games at home to claim the title. This was the second time that the tournament was won by a team from the Pacific-10 Conference who entered the tournament with a losing record (Oregon State, 2009).

Coach Dana Altman, who was in his first year at Oregon, coached at Creighton the year before.

== Participants ==
School	Conference	Overall record	Conference record
Austin Peay	Ohio Valley	20–13	13–5
Boise State	WAC	20–12	10–6
Creighton	Missouri Valley	19–14	10–8
Davidson	Southern	17–14	10–8
Duquesne	Atlantic 10	18–12	10–6
Evansville	Missouri Valley	15–15	9–9
Hofstra	CAA	21–11	14–4
James Madison	CAA	21–11	10–8
Miami (OH)	MAC	16–16	11–6
Montana	Big Sky	21–10	12–4
Oregon	Pac-10	16–17	7–11
Rhode Island	Atlantic 10	19–13	9–7
San Jose State	WAC	17–15	5–11
St. Bonaventure	Atlantic 10	16–14	8–8
UCF	Conference USA	19–11	6–10
Weber State	Big Sky	18–13	11–5

== Bracket ==
First round March 15–16
James Madison	65
Davidson	85
San Jose State	74
Creighton	85
Duquesne	87
Montana	76
Weber State	59
Oregon	68
Hofstra	70
Evansville	77
Austin Peay	80
Boise State	83
Miami (Ohio)	59
Rhode Island	76
St. Bonaventure	54
UCF	69

Quarterfinals; March 21
Davidson	92
Creighton	102
Duquesne	75
Oregon	77
Evansville	69
Boise State	75
Rhode Island	54
UCF	66

Semifinals (Reseeded); March 23
Boise State	71
Oregon	79
UCF	64
Creighton	82

Finals (Best of three); March 28, 30, April 1
Oregon	76	71	71
Creighton	84	58	69

During the finals, Oregon hosted games 2 and 3.
