= Mesker Amphitheatre =

Open-air theater in Indiana, US

Coordinates: 37.997713°N 87.606470°W

- Mesker
- Interactive map of Mesker Amphitheatre
- Location: Evansville, Indiana
- Owner: City of Evansville
- Capacity: 8,500
- Public transit: METS

Construction
- Opened: 1951
- Closed: 2012

Mesker Amphitheatre is an inactive historic 8,500-seat amphitheater, located in Evansville, Indiana, United States. It contained 5,500 chair back seats before they were removed and 3,000 lawn seats and is located at Mesker Park, near the Mesker Park Zoo.

It was built after the death of local philanthropist George Mesker, in 1936, who left $500,000, for park improvements and an additional $250,000, to provide music and entertainment.

The venue was closed in 2012 due to its deteriorating condition and has sat vacant since. At one point it was used to house crates of seats that were removed from Roberts Municipal Stadium that sat on its stage and near its entrance. These have seen been removed from the location. The amphitheatre's future remains uncertain.

== See also ==
- List of contemporary amphitheatres
