= 2011 Missouri Valley Conference men's basketball tournament =

2011 Basketball tournament held in St. Louis

- Classification: Division I
- Season: 2010–11
- Teams: 10
- Site: Scottrade Center; St. Louis, Missouri
- Champions: Indiana State (3rd title)
- Winning coach: Greg Lansing (1st title)
- MVP: Jermaine Mallett (Missouri State)
- Television: FSN Midwest, CBS

2010–11 Missouri Valley Conference men's basketball standings
| | Conf. | | | | Overall |
| Team | W | | L | PCT | W | | L | PCT |
|---|---|---|---|---|---|---|---|---|
| Missouri State | 15 | – | 3 | .833 | 26 | – | 9 | .743 |
| Wichita State | 14 | – | 4 | .778 | 29 | – | 8 | .784 |
| Indiana State † | 12 | – | 6 | .667 | 20 | – | 14 | .588 |
| Northern Iowa | 10 | – | 8 | .556 | 20 | – | 14 | .588 |
| Creighton | 10 | – | 8 | .556 | 23 | – | 16 | .590 |
| Evansville | 9 | – | 9 | .500 | 16 | – | 16 | .500 |
| Drake | 7 | – | 11 | .389 | 13 | – | 18 | .419 |
| Southern Illinois | 5 | – | 13 | .278 | 13 | – | 19 | .406 |
| Illinois State | 4 | – | 14 | .222 | 12 | – | 19 | .387 |
| Bradley | 4 | – | 14 | .222 | 12 | – | 20 | .375 |
† 2011 MVC tournament winner As of April 1, 2011; Rankings from AP Poll

The 2011 Missouri Valley Conference men's basketball tournament, popularly referred to as "Arch Madness", as part of the 2010-11 NCAA Division I men's basketball season, was played in St. Louis, Missouri, March 3–6, 2011, at the Scottrade Center. The championship game was broadcast live on CBS on Sunday, March 6, at 1:05 pm CST. The tournament's winner received the Missouri Valley Conference's automatic bid to the 2011 NCAA Men's Division I Basketball Tournament

After coming from behind in each their first two games, the #1 seed Missouri State Bears fell short to #3 seed Indiana State. Indiana State, who had needed a buzzer-beater against Evansville in the first round, made their first NCAA tournament appearance in a decade. They also defeated #2 seed Wichita State in the semifinal, en route to only their third NCAA Tournament since the Larry Bird-led Sycamores. Aaron Carter led the Sycamores with 15 points in the win.

== Tournament Bracket ==
The tournament took place March 3–6.

Opening Round; Thursday, March 3
8 | Southern Illinois | 57
9 | Illinois State | 54
7 | Drake | 48
10 | Bradley | 63

Quarterfinals; Friday, March 4
1 | Missouri State | 58
8 | Southern Illinois | 56
4 | Northern Iowa | 57
5 | Creighton | 60
2 | Wichita State | 70
10 | Bradley | 56
3 | Indiana State | 52
6 | Evansville | 50

Semifinals; Saturday, March 5
1 | Missouri State | 60
5 | Creighton | 50
2 | Wichita State | 54
3 | Indiana State | 61

Final; Sunday, March 6
1 | Missouri State | 56
3 | Indiana State | 60
