= Roberts Municipal Stadium =

Arena in Evansville, Indiana, US (1956–2013)

Coordinates: 37.97903°N 87.515926°W

- Interactive map of Roberts Municipal Stadium
- Location: 2600 East Division Street; Evansville, Indiana 47711-6813
- Owner: City of Evansville
- Operator: SMG
- Capacity: 12,732

Construction
- Groundbreaking: March 18, 1955
- Opened: October 28, 1956
- Renovated: 1980, 1990
- Closed: October 29, 2011
- Demolished: January 2013
- Cost: $2 million $1.2 million (1980 renovations) $16.2 million (1990 renovations)
- Architect: Ralph Legeman

Tenants
- Evansville Purple Aces (NCAA) (1956–2011); Evansville Thunder (CBA) (1984–86); Evansville BlueCats (NIFL/UIF) (2003–07)

Roberts Municipal Stadium was a multi-purpose arena in Evansville, Indiana, for sports, public events, and concerts. The arena was built in 1956. It seated up to 12,732 spectators and featured four locker rooms and a press room. On June 13, 1972, it hosted a concert by Elvis Presley. He then again performed at Roberts, for the second and last time on Oct. 24, 1976, breaking all existing attendance records, by drawing a crowd of 13,500.

Roberts Stadium hosted concerts by musicians such as Garth Brooks, Taylor Swift, Jimi Hendrix, Led Zeppelin, Alice Cooper, Bon Jovi, Bob Dylan, and Tool.

The arena received a $16 million upgrade in 1990. In 2007, the city of Evansville hired a professional consultant to examine whether the stadium should be renovated or replaced with a new downtown arena. Choosing between the strong concerns from several business owners on the city's east side who were concerned of losses to their businesses and the need to revitalized a badly degraded downtown area, in December 2008, the Evansville city council approved plans to construct the new arena, which opened in the fall of 2011 as the Ford Center.

It was co-managed with Mesker Amphitheatre, The Centre, and Victory Theatre. The building was demolished in 2013.

== Sporting events ==
The sports arena seated 12,500 for basketball. It was the home of the University of Evansville's Purple Aces basketball program from its opening in 1956 until the Aces moved downtown into the new Ford Center in 2011.

From 1957 to 1976, Roberts Stadium served as the host site for the NCAA College Division (now referred to as Division II) Men's Basketball National Championship. It again hosted the "Elite 8" in 2002. In addition, it regularly hosted a variety of other sporting events, most notably the Great Lakes Valley Conference (NCAA Division II) men's and women's basketball tournaments in early March of every year. It also hosted the 1980 and 1983 Midwestern City Conference (now Horizon League) men's basketball conference tournament. Roberts Stadium hosted the 1983 NCAA Division I men's basketball tournament first and second rounds. It also hosted multiple Indiana High School Athletic Association regional and semi-state basketball games in the single-class tournament.

== Defunct professional teams ==
From 1984 to 1986, Roberts Stadium was home to the Evansville Thunder of the Continental Basketball Association, who were slated to be coached in 1984 by future Utah Jazz coach and University of Evansville alumnus Jerry Sloan, who instead, accepted a position that season as an assistant coach for the Jazz.

From 2003 to 2007 Roberts was also home to the Evansville BlueCats of the National Indoor Football League in 2003 and 2004 and United Indoor Football from 2005 to 2007.

== See also ==
- Sports in Evansville, Indiana
