= 2010–11 Air Force Falcons men's basketball team =

American college basketball season

2010–11 Air Force Falcons men's basketball

CIT, Second Round
- Conference: Mountain West Conference
- Record: 16–16 (6–10 Mountain West)
- Head coach: Jeff Reynolds
- Assistant coaches: Dave Pilipovich; Steve Snell; Rob Pryor; Drew Long; Tom Bellairs
- Home arena: Clune Arena

2010–11 Mountain West Conference men's basketball standings
| | Conf. | | | | Overall |
| Team | W | | L | PCT | W | | L | PCT |
|---|---|---|---|---|---|---|---|---|
| No. 6 San Diego St † | 14 | – | 2 | .875 | 34 | – | 3 | .919 |
| No. 12 BYU | 14 | – | 2 | .875 | 32 | – | 5 | .865 |
| UNLV | 11 | – | 5 | .688 | 24 | – | 9 | .727 |
| Colorado State | 9 | – | 7 | .563 | 19 | – | 13 | .594 |
| New Mexico | 8 | – | 8 | .500 | 22 | – | 13 | .629 |
| Air Force | 6 | – | 10 | .375 | 16 | – | 16 | .500 |
| Utah | 6 | – | 10 | .375 | 13 | – | 18 | .419 |
| Wyoming | 3 | – | 13 | .188 | 10 | – | 21 | .323 |
| TCU | 1 | – | 15 | .063 | 11 | – | 22 | .333 |
† 2011 MWC tournament winner Rankings from AP/Coaches' Poll

The 2010–11 Air Force Falcons men's basketball team represented the United States Air Force Academy in the 2010–11 NCAA Division I men's basketball season. Led by fourth-year head coach Jeff Reynolds, the Falcons played their home games at Clune Arena on at the Air Force Academy's main campus in Colorado Springs, Colorado. They finished the season 16–16, with a 6–10 record in Mountain West play, finishing in sixth place. The Falcons lost in the quarterfinals of the 2011 Mountain West Conference men's basketball tournament to UNLV. They were invited to the 2011 CollegeInsider.com Tournament, where they defeated North Dakota in the opening round before being eliminated in the second round by Santa Clara.

== Roster ==
2010–11 Air Force Falcons men's basketball team
Players
Coaches

| Pos. | # | Name | Height | Weight | Year | Hometown |
|---|---|---|---|---|---|---|
| F | 00 | Chris Blake | 6 ft 7 in (2.01 m) | 205 lb (93 kg) | Fr | San Antonio, TX |
| G | 1 | Scott Stucky | 6 ft 3 in (1.91 m) | 185 lb (84 kg) | Jr | Dublin, OH |
| G/F | 5 | Mike Fitzgerald | 6 ft 6 in (1.98 m) | 195 lb (88 kg) | So | Centerville, MN |
| G | 10 | Todd Fletcher | 6 ft 2 in (1.88 m) | 180 lb (82 kg) | So | Lee's Summit, MO |
| G | 12 | Ben Matthewson | 6 ft 3 in (1.91 m) | 180 lb (82 kg) | So | San Antonio, TX |
| F | 13 | Zach Bohannon | 6 ft 8 in (2.03 m) | 205 lb (93 kg) | So | Marion, IA |
| G | 14 | Michael Lyons | 6 ft 6 in (1.98 m) | 190 lb (86 kg) | So | Newport News, VA |
| G/F | 15 | Taylor Stewart | 6 ft 5 in (1.96 m) | 190 lb (86 kg) | Jr | Lexington, KY |
| F | 20 | Tom Fow | 6 ft 6 in (1.98 m) | 205 lb (93 kg) | Sr | Scottsdale, AZ |
| F | 21 | Myles Jerrett | 6 ft 7 in (2.01 m) | 215 lb (98 kg) | Fr | Chino Hills, CA |
| F | 22 | Sean Bowman | 6 ft 7 in (2.01 m) | 195 lb (88 kg) | Fr | Houston, TX |
| G | 23 | Jamil Bailey | 6 ft 4 in (1.93 m) | 200 lb (91 kg) | Fr | Dallas, TX |
| F | 24 | Derek Brooks | 6 ft 6 in (1.98 m) | 200 lb (91 kg) | Sr | Nathalie, VA |
| G | 25 | Kyle Green | 6 ft 3 in (1.91 m) | 190 lb (86 kg) | So | Richland, TX |
| G/F | 30 | Adam Brakeville | 6 ft 6 in (1.98 m) | 210 lb (95 kg) | So | San Clemente, CA |
| G | 32 | Shawn Hempsey | 6 ft 2 in (1.88 m) | 180 lb (82 kg) | Jr | Encinitas, CA |
| C | 34 | Taylor Broekhuis | 6 ft 10 in (2.08 m) | 210 lb (95 kg) | So | Colorado Springs, CO |
| G | 35 | Evan Washington | 6 ft 4 in (1.93 m) | 200 lb (91 kg) | Sr | Columbus, OH |
| F | 44 | Chase Kammerer | 6 ft 8 in (2.03 m) | 210 lb (95 kg) | Fr | Montgomery, TX |

Head coach

- Jeff Reynolds (UNC Greensboro)

Assistant coach(es)

- Dave Pilipovich (Thiel)
- Steve Snell (Radford)
- Rob Pryor (Air Force)
- Drew Long (Northwestern)

Legend

- (C) Team captain
- (S) Suspended
- (I) Ineligible
- (W) Walk-on
- Injured
- Current redshirt

== Schedule and results ==
| Date time, TV | Rank^{#} | Opponent^{#} | Result | Record | Site (attendance) city, state |
Regular season
| November 14, 2010*; 2:00 pm | | UC Colorado Springs | W 66–53 | 1–0 | Clune Arena (1,103); Colorado Springs, CO |
| November 17, 2010*; 7:00 pm | | Colorado College | L 57–60 ^{OT} | 1–1 | Clune Arena (1,007); Colorado Springs, CO |
| November 20, 2010*; 7:00 pm | | Tennessee State | W 87–72 | 2–1 | Clune Arena (1,378); Colorado Springs, CO |
| November 24, 2010*; 4:00 pm | | at Wofford | W 72–66 ^{OT} | 3–1 | Benjamin Johnson Arena (1,526); Spartanburg, SC |
| December 2, 2010*; 7:00 pm | | Cal State Northridge | W 72–63 | 4–1 | Clune Arena (1,021); Colorado Springs, CO |
| December 5, 2010*; 1:00 pm, The Mtn. | | Evansville; MWC–MVC Challenge | W 57–56 | 5–1 | Clune Arena (1,148); Colorado Springs, CO |
| December 8, 2010*; 5:00 pm | | at Wright State | L 61–76 | 5–2 | Nutter Center (5,542); Dayton, OH |
| December 11, 2010*; 7:00 pm | | North Carolina Central | W 73–56 | 6–2 | Clune Arena (1,107); Colorado Springs, CO |
| December 18, 2010*; 7:00 pm | | Arkansas–Pine Bluff | W 63–52 | 7–2 | Clune Arena (1,249); Colorado Springs, CO |
| December 22, 2010*; 6:35 pm | | at Northern Arizona | L 63–74 | 7–3 | Rolle Activity Center (447); Flagstaff, AZ |
| December 28, 2010*; 9:00 pm | | vs. Sam Houston State; Sun Bowl Invitational | W 76–65 | 8–3 | Don Haskins Center (6,010); El Paso, TX |
| December 29, 2010*; 7:30 pm | | at UTEP; Sun Bowl Invitational | L 54–71 | 8–4 | Don Haskins Center (7,234); El Paso, TX |
| January 2, 2011*; 4:30 pm | | Florida A&M | W 81–48 | 9–4 | Clune Arena (1,157); Colorado Springs, CO |
| January 5, 2011; 8:00 pm, The Mtn. | | Utah | W 77–69 | 10–4 (1–0) | Clune Arena (1,362); Colorado Springs, CO |
| January 8, 2011; 1:00 pm, The Mtn. | | at No. 15 BYU | L 66–76 | 10–5 (1–1) | Marriott Center (22,700); Provo, UT |
| January 15, 2011; 4:00 pm, The Mtn. | | UNLV | L 52–64 | 10–6 (1–2) | Clune Arena (3,031); Colorado Springs, CO |
| January 19, 2011; 8:00 pm | | at No. 6 San Diego State | L 55–68 | 10–7 (1–3) | Viejas Arena (12,414); San Diego, CA |
| January 23, 2011; 1:30 pm, The Mtn. | | Wyoming | W 72–51 | 11–7 (2–3) | Clune Arena (3,904); Colorado Springs, CO |
| January 26, 2011; 6:00 pm, The Mtn. | | at Colorado State | L 66–69 | 11–8 (2–4) | Moby Arena (4,150); Fort Collins, CO |
| January 29, 2011; 4:00 pm, CBSCS | | at TCU | W 66–65 ^{OT} | 12–8 (3–4) | Daniel-Meyer Coliseum (4,969); Fort Worth, TX |
| February 1, 2011; 7:00 pm, The Mtn. | | New Mexico | L 61–75 | 12–9 (3–5) | Clune Arena (2,296); Colorado Springs, CO |
| February 5, 2011; 6:00 pm, The Mtn. | | at Utah | W 54–49 | 13–9 (4–5) | Jon M. Huntsman Center (8,890); Salt Lake City, UT |
| February 9, 2011; 8:00 pm, The Mtn. | | No. 7 BYU | L 52–90 | 13–10 (4–6) | Clune Arena (6,028); Colorado Springs, CO |
| February 15, 2011; 8:30 pm, The Mtn. | | at UNLV | L 42–49 | 13–11 (4–7) | Thomas & Mack Center (10,928); Paradise, NV |
| February 19, 2011; 12:00 pm, The Mtn. | | No. 6 San Diego State | L 58–70 | 13–12 (4–8) | Clune Arena (3,463); Colorado Springs, CO |
| February 23, 2011; 8:00 pm, The Mtn. | | at Wyoming | L 61–63 | 13–13 (4–9) | Arena-Auditorium (4,262); Laramie, WY |
| February 26, 2011; 4:30 pm, The Mtn. | | Colorado State | W 74–57 | 14–13 (5–9) | Clune Arena (4,429); Colorado Springs, CO |
| March 2, 2011; 7:00 pm, The Mtn. | | TCU | W 70–65 | 15–13 (6–9) | Clune Arena (1,707); Colorado Springs, CO |
| March 5, 2011; 8:00 pm, The Mtn. | | at New Mexico | L 61–66 | 15–14 (6–10) | The Pit (15,344); Albuquerque, NM |
Mountain West tournament
| March 10, 2011; 9:30 pm, The Mtn. | (6) | vs. (3) UNLV; Quarterfinals | L 53–69 | 15–15 | Thomas & Mack Center (12,325); Paradise, NV |
CollegeInsider.com tournament
| March 15, 2011*; 7:00 pm | | North Dakota; CIT First Round | W 77–67 | 16–15 | Clune Arena (1,137); Colorado Springs, CO |
| March 18, 2011*; 8:00 pm | | at Santa Clara; CIT Second Round | L 75–88 | 16–16 | Leavey Center (1,236); Santa Clara, CA |
*Non-conference game. ^{#}Rankings from AP Poll. (#) Tournament seedings in parentheses. All times are in Mountain Time.

== See also ==
- 2010–11 NCAA Division I men's basketball season
- 2010–11 NCAA Division I men's basketball rankings
