= 2010–11 Colorado State Rams men's basketball team =

American college basketball season

2010–11 Colorado State Rams men's basketball
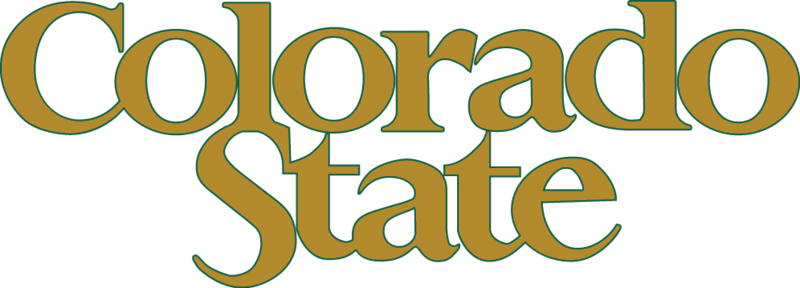

Cancun Governor's Cup Champions

NIT, First Round
- Conference: Mountain West Conference
- Record: 19–13 (9–7 Mountain West)
- Head coach: Tim Miles
- Assistant coaches: Niko Medved; Craig Smith; DeMarlo Slocum
- Home arena: Moby Arena

2010–11 Mountain West Conference men's basketball standings
	Conf.				Overall
Team	W		L	PCT	W		L	PCT
No. 6 San Diego St †	14	–	2	.875	34	–	3	.919
No. 12 BYU	14	–	2	.875	32	–	5	.865
UNLV	11	–	5	.688	24	–	9	.727
Colorado State	9	–	7	.563	19	–	13	.594
New Mexico	8	–	8	.500	22	–	13	.629
Air Force	6	–	10	.375	16	–	16	.500
Utah	6	–	10	.375	13	–	18	.419
Wyoming	3	–	13	.188	10	–	21	.323
TCU	1	–	15	.063	11	–	22	.333
† 2011 MWC tournament winner Rankings from AP/Coaches' Poll

The 2010–11 Colorado State Rams men's basketball team represented Colorado State University. The team was coached by Tim Miles in his 4th season. They played their home games at the Moby Arena on Colorado State University's main campus in Fort Collins, Colorado and are a member of the Mountain West Conference. They finished the season 19–13, 9–7 in Mountain West play and lost in the quarterfinals of the 2011 Mountain West Conference men's basketball tournament to New Mexico. They were invited to the 2011 National Invitation Tournament which they lost in the first round to Fairfield.

== Roster ==
#	Name	Height	Weight (lbs.)	Position	Class	Hometown	Previous School
1	Travis Franklin	6'7'	215	F	Sr.	Baton Rouge, LA	Colby CC
2	Wes Eikmeier	6'3"	175	G	RS So.	Fremont, NE	Iowa State
3	Trevor Williams	7'0"	270	C	RS Fr.	Denver, CO	Denver Lutheran HS
4	Pierce Hornung	6'5"	200	F	So.	Arvada, CO	Ralston Valley HS
5	Moe Wiltz	6'2"	175	G	Fr.	Stafford, TX	Stafford HS
10	Kaipo Sabas	5'11"	180	G	Jr.	Fort Collins, CO	Laramie County CC
11	Jesse Carr	6'2"	180	G	RS So.	Ainsworth, NE	Ainsworth HS
12	Adam Nigon	6'3"	175	G	Sr.	Bromfield, CO	Broomfield HS
13	Andre McFarland	6'6"	225	F	Sr.	Las Vegas, NV	Brewster Acad.
22	Dorian Green	6'2"	170	G	So.	Lawrence, KS	Lawrence HS
23	Will Bell	6'6"	230	F	Jr.	Colorado Springs, CO	Northeastern JC
25	Chad Calcaterra	6'10"	250	C	Fr.	Cloquet, MN	Cloquet HS
32	Andy Ogide	6'9"	245	F	RS Sr.	Marietta, GA	Mississippi
33	Dwight Smith	6'4"	190	G	Fr.	Omaha, NE	Ralston HS
44	Greg Smith	6'6"	200	F	So.	Omaha, NE	Ralston HS

== Preview ==
The Rams were picked to finish fifth in the Mountain West Conference, behind defending conference tournament champion San Diego State Aztecs, the BYU Cougars led by preseason player of the year (Jimmer Fredette), the New Mexico Lobos and the UNLV Rebels. Colorado State received a fifth-place vote and 135 points.

== Tim Miles Extension Contract ==
During the off season, it was announced that Tim Miles has extended his contract to 2015–2016 year.

== Schedule and results ==
Date time, TV	Rank^{#}	Opponent^{#}	Result	Record	Site (attendance) city, state
Exhibition
11/02/2010*; 7:00 pm		Regis	W 88–48	–	Moby Arena (2,239); Fort Collins, CO
11/06/2010*; 5:30 pm		Western State	W 89–51	–	Moby Arena (2,236); Fort Collins, CO
Regular season
11/12/2010*; 7:00 pm		Arkansas–Pine Bluff	W 82–51	1–0	Moby Arena (2,833); Fort Collins, CO
11/18/2010*; 7:00 pm, FSNRM		at Denver	W 77–66	2–0	Magness Arena (4,851); Denver, CO
11/27/2010*; 7:00 pm		Sam Houston State	L 81–92	2–1	Moby Arena (2,556); Fort Collins, CO
12/01/2010*; 6:00 pm, The Mtn.		Drake; MWC–MVC Challenge	W 78–67	3–1	Moby Arena (2,215); Fort Collins, CO
12/04/2010*; 7:00 pm		Fresno State	W 87–74	4–1	Moby Arena (3,567); Fort Collins, CO
12/08/2010*; 8:00 pm, FSNRM		at Colorado	L 83–90 ^{OT}	4–2	Coors Events Center (7,219); Boulder, CO
12/11/2010*; 4:30 pm, ESPN2		vs. No. 4 Kansas	L 55–76	4–3	Sprint Center (18,756); Kansas City, MO
12/20/2010*; 7:00 pm		Northern Colorado	W 75–61	5–3	Moby Arena (4,680); Fort Collins, CO
12/22/2010*; 6:30 pm		vs. Appalachian State; Cancún Governor's Cup	W 82–79	6–3	Poliforum Benito Juarez (814); Cancún, MX
12/23/2010*; 7:30 pm, ESPNU		vs. Ole Miss; Cancún Governor's Cup	W 68–61	7–3	Poliforum Benito Juarez (896); Cancún, MX
12/24/2010*; 7:00 pm, ESPN2		vs. Southern Miss; Cancún Governor's Cup	W 63–58	8–3	Poliforum Benito Juarez (720); Cancún, MX
12/28/2010*; 8:00 pm		at San Francisco; Hilltop Challenge	W 69–61	9–3	War Memorial Gymnasium (1,784); San Francisco, CA
12/30/2010*; 4:00 pm		vs. Dominican (CA); Hilltop Challenge	W 94–50	10–3	War Memorial Gymnasium (211); San Francisco, CA
01/01/2011*; 2:00 pm		vs. Hampton; Hilltop Challenge	L 75–77	10–4	War Memorial Gymasium (177); San Francisco, CA
01/04/2011; 7:00 pm, The Mtn.		Wyoming	W 73–60	11–4 (1–0)	Moby Arena (4,060); Fort Collins, CO
01/12/2011; 8:00 pm, The Mtn.		at New Mexico	L 61–68	11–5 (1–1)	The Pit (14,303); Albuquerque, NM
01/15/2011; 7:00 pm, The Mtn.		TCU	W 79–69	12–5 (2–1)	Moby Arena (4,193); Fort Collins, CO
01/19/2011; 8:30 pm, The Mtn.		at UNLV	W 78–63	13–5 (3–1)	Thomas & Mack Center (11,266); Paradise, NV
01/22/2011; 7:00 pm, The Mtn.		No. 9 BYU	L 85–94	13–6 (3–2)	Moby Arena (8,745); Fort Collins, CO
01/26/2011; 6:00 pm, The Mtn.		Air Force	W 69–66	14–6 (4–2)	Moby Arena (4,150); Fort Collins, CO
01/29/2011; 4:00 pm, The Mtn.		at Utah	W 74–68	15–6 (5–2)	Jon M. Huntsman Center (9,132); Salt Lake City, UT
02/02/2011; 7:00 pm, CBSCS		No. 7 San Diego State	L 54–56	15–7 (5–3)	Moby Arena (7,353); Fort Collins, CO
02/05/2011; 6:00 pm, CBSCS		at Wyoming	W 59–56	16–7 (6–3)	Arena-Auditorium (5,453); Laramie, WY
02/12/2011; 8:00 pm, The Mtn.		New Mexico	W 68–62	17–7 (7–3)	Moby Arena (6,425); Fort Collins, CO
02/16/2011; 6:00 pm, The Mtn.		at TCU	W 69–55	18–7 (8–3)	Daniel-Meyer Coliseum (4,088); Fort Worth, TX
02/19/2011; 5:00 pm, The Mtn.		UNLV	L 61–68	18–8 (8–4)	Moby Arena (8,745); Fort Collins, CO
02/23/2011; 6:00 pm, The Mtn.		at No. 7 BYU	L 76–84	18–9 (8–5)	Marriott Center (22,700); Provo, UT
02/26/2011; 4:30 pm, The Mtn.		at Air Force	L 57–74	18–10 (8–6)	Clune Arena (4,429); Colorado Springs, CO
03/02/2011; 7:00 pm, CBSCS		Utah	W 78–65	19–10 (9–6)	Moby Arena (5,581); Fort Collins, CO
03/05/2011; 8:00 pm, The Mtn.		at No. 9 San Diego State	L 48–66	19–11 (9–7)	Viejas Arena (12,414); San Diego, CA
2011 Mountain West Conference men's basketball tournament
03/10/2011; 3:30 pm, The Mtn.	(4)	vs. (5) New Mexico; Quarterfinals	L 61–67	19–12	Thomas & Mack Center (14,697); Paradise, NV
2011 National Invitation Tournament
03/15/2011*; 7:00 pm, ESPN2	(3 C)	(6 C) Fairfield; NIT First Round	L 60–62	19–13	Moby Arena (3,202); Fort Collins, CO
*Non-conference game. ^{#}Rankings from AP Poll/Coaches' Poll. (#) Tournament seedings in parentheses. C=NIT Colorado bracket. All times are in Mountain Time.

== See also ==
- 2010–11 NCAA Division I men's basketball season
- 2010–11 NCAA Division I men's basketball rankings
