= 2010–11 Utah Utes men's basketball team =

American college basketball season

2010–11 Utah Utes men's basketball
- Conference: Mountain West Conference
- Record: 13–18 (6–10 Mountain West)
- Head coach: Jim Boylen (4th year)
- Assistant coaches: Jeff Smith; Barret Peery; Stan Johnson
- Home arena: Jon M. Huntsman Center

2010–11 Mountain West Conference men's basketball standings
	Conf.				Overall
Team	W		L	PCT	W		L	PCT
No. 6 San Diego St †	14	–	2	.875	34	–	3	.919
No. 12 BYU	14	–	2	.875	32	–	5	.865
UNLV	11	–	5	.688	24	–	9	.727
Colorado State	9	–	7	.563	19	–	13	.594
New Mexico	8	–	8	.500	22	–	13	.629
Air Force	6	–	10	.375	16	–	16	.500
Utah	6	–	10	.375	13	–	18	.419
Wyoming	3	–	13	.188	10	–	21	.323
TCU	1	–	15	.063	11	–	22	.333
† 2011 MWC tournament winner Rankings from AP/Coaches' Poll

The 2010–11 Utah Utes men's basketball team represented the University of Utah. They played their home games at the Jon M. Huntsman Center in Salt Lake City, Utah, United States and were a member of the Mountain West Conference. They finished the season 13–18, 6–10 in Mountain West play and lost in the quarterfinals of the 2011 Mountain West Conference men's basketball tournament to San Diego State. On March 12, 2011, the University of Utah fired head coach Jim Boylen after consecutive losing seasons. Starting in July 2011, they will be leaving the Mountain West Conference and will join the Pac-12. Their leading scorer Will Clyburn was granted a scholarship release at the end of the season and subsequently transferred to Iowa State.

== Roster ==
#	Name	Position	Height	Weight (lbs.)	Class	Hometown
0	Chris Hines	G	6–1	195	RS Sophomore	Houston, TX
1	Jay Watkins	F	6–8	215	RS Senior	Memphis, TN
2	Chris Kupets	G	6–0	175	Junior	Athens, GA
3	Preston Guiot	G	6–0	185	Freshman	Bolivar, MO
10	Antonio DiMaria	G/F	6–6	195	RS Junior	Pittsburgh, PA
11	Dominique Lee	G	6–4	205	Freshman	Oakland, CA
13	Michael Hodgman	G	6–1	175	Freshman	Los Gatos, CA
15	Josh Watkins	G	6–0	200	Junior	New York City, NY
20	J. J. O'Brien	G/F	6–7	215	Freshman	Rancho Cucamonga, CA
21	Will Clyburn	G/F	6–7	200	Junior	Detroit, MI
25	Josh Fuller	G/F	6–7	210	Freshman	Rexburg, ID
32	Shawn Glover	G/F	6–7	195	Sophomore	Cedar Hill, TX
40	Seth Tippetts	F	6–8	235	Freshman	Sandy, UT
41	Neal Monson	C	6–10	220	Freshman	Sandy, UT
42	Jason Washburn	C	7–0	230	RS Sophomore	Battle Creek, MI
51	David Foster	C	7–3	255	Junior	Lake Forest, CA

== Schedule and results ==
Date time, TV	Rank^{#}	Opponent^{#}	Result	Record	Site (attendance) city, state
Exhibition
11/5/2010*; 7:00 PM		Adams State	W 84–74	–	Jon M. Huntsman Center (7,279); Salt Lake City, UT
Regular season
11/12/2010*; 7:00 PM		Grand Canyon	W 72–48	1–0	Jon M. Huntsman Center (7,334); Salt Lake City, UT
11/17/2010*; 7:00 PM		Montana	W 80–71	2–0	Jon M. Huntsman Center (7,293); Salt Lake City, UT
11/20/2010*; 4:00 PM		Weber State	W 90–75	3–0	Jon M. Huntsman Center (7,836); Salt Lake City, UT
12/1/2010*; 7:05 PM, CW30		at Utah State	L 62–79	3–1	Smith Spectrum (8,368); Logan, UT
11/27/2010*; 7:00 PM		Oral Roberts	L 70–78	3–2	Jon M. Huntsman Center (7,387); Salt Lake City, UT
11/30/2010*; 7:00 PM		Fresno State	W 76–63	4–2	Jon M. Huntsman Center (7,363); Salt Lake City, UT
12/4/2010*; 6:05 PM		at Bradley; MWC–MVC Challenge	W 68–60	5–2	Carver Arena (9,076); Peoria, IL
12/7/2010*; 7:00 PM		Pepperdine	W 67–60	6–2	Jon M. Huntsman Center (7,396); Salt Lake City, UT
12/10/2010*; 4:30 PM, BTN		at Michigan	L 64–75	6–3	Crisler Arena (9,634); Ann Arbor, MI
12/17/2010*; 7:00 PM		Boise State	W 86–84	7–3	Jon M. Huntsman Center (7,732); Salt Lake City, UT
12/22/2010*; 12:00 PM, ESPNU		vs. Butler; Diamond Head Classic	L 62–74	7–4	Stan Sheriff Center; Honolulu, HI
12/23/2010*; 10:30 PM, ESPNU		at Hawaii; Diamond Head Classic	L 55–68	7–5	Stan Sheriff Center (6,667); Honolulu, HI
12/25/2010*; 9:00 AM		vs. San Diego; Diamond Head Classic	L 64–67	7–6	Stan Sheriff Center; Honolulu, HI
12/31/2011*; 3:00 PM		at Portland	L 79–88	7–7	Chiles Center (1,756); Portland, OR
1/5/2011; 8:00 PM, The Mtn.		at Air Force	L 69–77	7–8 (0–1)	Clune Arena (1,362); Colorado Springs, CO
1/8/2011; 2:00 PM, Versus		No. 6 San Diego State	L 62–71	7–9 (0–2)	Jon M. Huntsman Center (8,571); Salt Lake City, UT
1/11/2011; 6:30 PM, The Mtn.		No. 11 BYU	L 79–104	7–10 (0–3)	Jon M. Huntsman Center (11,243); Salt Lake City, UT
1/15/2011; 1:30 PM, The Mtn.		at Wyoming	W 68–51	8–10 (1–3)	Arena-Auditorium (4,670); Laramie, WY
1/19/2011; 6:00 PM, The Mtn.		New Mexico	W 82–72	9–10 (2–3)	Jon M. Huntsman Center (8,717); Salt Lake City, UT
1/22/2011; 4:00 PM, The Mtn.		at TCU	W 75–62	10–10 (3–3)	Daniel-Meyer Coliseum (4,190); Fort Worth, TX
1/29/2011; 4:00 PM, The Mtn.		Colorado State	L 68–74	10–11 (3–4)	Jon M. Huntsman Center (9,132); Salt Lake City, UT
2/2/2011; 8:30 PM, The Mtn.		at UNLV	L 54–56	10–12 (3–5)	Thomas & Mack Center (11,842); Paradise, NV
2/5/2011; 6:00 PM, The Mtn.		Air Force	L 49–54	10–13 (3–6)	Jon M. Huntsman Center (8,890); Salt Lake City, UT
2/8/2011; 8:30 PM, The Mtn.		at No. 6 San Diego State	L 53–85	10–14 (3–7)	Viejas Arena (12,414); San Diego, CA
2/12/2011; 4:00 PM, The Mtn.		at No. 7 BYU	L 59–72	10–15 (3–8)	Marriott Center (22,700); Provo, UT
2/16/2011; 7:15 PM, CBSCS		Wyoming	W 80–70	11–15 (4–8)	Jon M. Huntsman Center (8,275); Salt Lake City, UT
2/19/2011; 7:30 PM, The Mtn.		at New Mexico	W 62–60	12–15 (5–8)	The Pit (15,333); Albuquerque, NM
2/22/2011; 8:00 PM, The Mtn.		TCU	W 50–48	13–15 (6–8)	Jon M. Huntsman Center (9,203); Salt Lake City, UT
3/2/2011; 7:00 PM, CBSCS		at Colorado State	L 65–78	13–16 (6–9)	Moby Arena (5,581); Fort Collins, CO
3/5/2011; 2:00 PM, Versus		UNLV	L 58–78	13–17 (6–10)	Jon M. Huntsman Center (9,969); Salt Lake City, UT
Mountain West tournament
3/10/2011; 8:30 PM, The Mtn.	(7)	vs. (2) No. 7 San Diego State; Quarterfinals	L 50–64	13–18	Thomas & Mack Center; Paradise, NV
*Non-conference game. ^{#}Rankings from AP Poll/Coaches' Poll. (#) Tournament seedings in parentheses. All times are in Mountain Time.

== See also ==
- 2010–11 NCAA Division I men's basketball season
- 2010–11 NCAA Division I men's basketball rankings
