= 2010–11 Wyoming Cowboys basketball team =

American college basketball season

2010–11 Wyoming Cowboys basketball
- Conference: Mountain West Conference
- Record: 10–21 (3–13 Mountain West)
- Head coach: Heath Schroyer (4th year, Fired on Feb. 8); Fred Langley (Interim Coach)
- Assistant coaches: Anthony Stewart; Nate Dixon
- Home arena: Arena-Auditorium (Capacity: 15,028)

2010–11 Mountain West Conference men's basketball standings
| | Conf. | | | | Overall |
| Team | W | | L | PCT | W | | L | PCT |
|---|---|---|---|---|---|---|---|---|
| No. 6 San Diego St † | 14 | – | 2 | .875 | 34 | – | 3 | .919 |
| No. 12 BYU | 14 | – | 2 | .875 | 32 | – | 5 | .865 |
| UNLV | 11 | – | 5 | .688 | 24 | – | 9 | .727 |
| Colorado State | 9 | – | 7 | .563 | 19 | – | 13 | .594 |
| New Mexico | 8 | – | 8 | .500 | 22 | – | 13 | .629 |
| Air Force | 6 | – | 10 | .375 | 16 | – | 16 | .500 |
| Utah | 6 | – | 10 | .375 | 13 | – | 18 | .419 |
| Wyoming | 3 | – | 13 | .188 | 10 | – | 21 | .323 |
| TCU | 1 | – | 15 | .063 | 11 | – | 22 | .333 |
† 2011 MWC tournament winner Rankings from AP/Coaches' Poll

The 2010–11 Wyoming Cowboys basketball team represented the University of Wyoming during the 2010–2011 NCAA Division I men's basketball season. The Cowboys was coached by Heath Schroyer, he was fired on February 8, 2011. Fred Langley replaced Heath Schroyer as their interim coach. They played their home games at the Arena-Auditorium in Laramie, Wyoming. The Cowboys are a member of the Mountain West Conference. They finished the season 10–21, 3–13 in Mountain West play and lost in the first round of the 2011 Mountain West Conference men's basketball tournament to TCU.

== Preview ==
The Cowboys were picked to finish eighth in the Mountain West Conference.

== Roster ==
2010–11 Wyoming Cowboys men's basketball team
Players
Coaches

| Pos. | # | Name | Height | Weight | Year | Previous school | Hometown |
|---|---|---|---|---|---|---|---|
| G | 1 | JayDee Luster | 5 ft 9 in (1.75 m) | 160 lb (73 kg) | Jr | New Mexico State; Hoover HS | San Diego, CA |
| G | 2 | Arthur Bouëdo | 6 ft 4 in (1.93 m) | 185 lb (84 kg) | Jr | Stone3ridge Prep | Aix-en-Provence, France |
| G | 3 | Desmar Jackson | 6 ft 5 in (1.96 m) | 175 lb (79 kg) | So | Warren G. Harding HS | Warren, OH |
| G | 4 | Franciso Cruz | 6 ft 3 in (1.91 m) | 217 lb (98 kg) | Jr | Western Nebraska CC; Abraham Lincoln HS | Nogales, Mexico |
| G/F | 11 | Afam Muojeke | 6 ft 8 in (2.03 m) | 210 lb (95 kg) | Jr | Genesis One Prep | Jamaica, NY |
| C | 15 | Adam Waddell | 6 ft 10 in (2.08 m) | 235 lb (107 kg) | Jr | Cody HS | Cody, WY |
| G | 21 | Joe Hudson | 6 ft 1 in (1.85 m) | 180 lb (82 kg) | Fr | Escondido HS | Escondido, CA |
| F | 22 | Amath M'Baye | 6 ft 9 in (2.06 m) | 208 lb (94 kg) | So | Stoneridge Prep | Bordeaux, France |
| F | 23 | Djibril Thiam | 6 ft 10 in (2.08 m) | 215 lb (98 kg) | Sr | Baylor; Stoneridge Prep | Dakar, Senegal |
| G/F | 35 | Daylen Harrison | 6 ft 6 in (1.98 m) | 214 lb (97 kg) | So | St. Vincent–St. Mary HS | Akron, OH |
| F | 00 | Brian Gibson | 6 ft 8 in (2.03 m) | 243 lb (110 kg) | So | Delgado CC; Capitol HS | Baton Rouge, LA |

Head coach

- Heath Schroyer (Armstrong Atlantic State)
- Fred Langley (Interim) (Fresno State)

Assistant coach(es)

- Anthony Stewart (Mount Union)
- Nate Dixon (UNC Wilmington)

Legend

- (C) Team captain
- (S) Suspended
- (I) Ineligible
- (W) Walk-on
- Injured
- Current redshirt

== Statistics ==
| Player | GP | GS | MPG | FG% | 3FG% | FT% | RPG | APG | SPG | BPG | PPG |
|---|---|---|---|---|---|---|---|---|---|---|---|
| Arthur Bouëdo | 30 | 5 | 13.8 | .325 | .259 | .571 | 1.1 | 0.8 | 0.4 | 0.0 | 2.6 |
| Francisco Cruz | 31 | 30 | 31.2 | .459 | .381 | .833 | 3.3 | 1.7 | 1.0 | 0.1 | 10.0 |
| Brian Gibson | 23 | 3 | 8.3 | .629 | .000 | .435 | 3.3 | 0.0 | 0.3 | 0.2 | 2.3 |
| Daylen Harrison | 27 | 5 | 14.3 | .382 | .300 | .818 | 2.3 | 0.9 | 0.5 | 0.2 | 3.6 |
| Joe Hudson | 22 | 1 | 10.2 | .263 | .235 | .833 | 0.8 | 0.3 | 0.4 | 0.0 | 2.9 |
| Desmar Jackson | 30 | 25 | 29.8 | .444 | .281 | .755 | 4.9 | 2.1 | 2.0 | 0.6 | 14.6 |
| JayDee Luster | 28 | 22 | 27.9 | .336 | .214 | .680 | 2.3 | 3.4 | 0.9 | 0.0 | 5.9 |
| Amath M'Baye | 31 | 31 | 30.3 | .475 | .163 | .670 | 5.7 | 0.7 | 0.7 | 0.9 | 12.0 |
| Afam Muojeke | 11 | 4 | 18.3 | .350 | .314 | .722 | 2.4 | 0.9 | 0.7 | 0.0 | 7.7 |
| Djibril Thiam | 30 | 26 | 26.5 | .538 | .222 | .612 | 4.6 | 0.5 | 1.2 | 1.5 | 9.6 |
| Adam Waddell | 23 | 3 | 17.7 | .333 | .333 | .516 | 3.1 | 0.3 | 0.4 | 0.7 | 3.9 |

== Schedule and results ==
| Date time, TV | Rank^{#} | Opponent^{#} | Result | Record | Site (attendance) city, state |
Exhibition
| 11/06/2010*; 8:00 pm | | Peru State | W 100–55 | — | Arena-Auditorium (4,422); Laramie, WY |
Regular Season
| 11/13/2010*; 8:00 pm | | Kean | W 92–58 | 1–0 | Arena-Auditorium (4,640); Laramie, WY |
| 11/16/2010*; 7:00 pm | | at Northern Colorado | L 53–67 | 1–1 | Butler–Hancock Sports Pavilion (2,051); Greeley, CO |
| 11/18/2010*; 7:00 pm | | North Florida; Cancún Challenge | L 60–76 | 1–2 | Arena-Auditorium (4,142); Laramie, WY |
| 11/20/2010*; 7:00 pm | | Western Illinois; Cancún Challenge | W 64–55 | 2–2 | Arena-Auditorium (4,142); Laramie, WY |
| 11/23/2010*; 6:00 pm, CBSCS | | vs. No. 11 Missouri; Cancún Challenge semifinals | L 62–72 | 2–3 | Aventura Palace (330); Playa del Carmen, MX |
| 11/24/2010*; 5:00 pm, CBSCS | | vs. Providence; Cancún Challenge 3rd place game | L 77–84 | 2–4 | Aventura Palace; Playa del Carmen, MX |
| 12/01/2010*; 6:00 pm | | at South Dakota | L 70–80 | 2–5 | DakotaDome (1,768); Vermillion, SD |
| 12/04/2010*; 5:00 pm, The Mtn. | | Indiana State; MWC–MVC Challenge | W 81–51 | 3–5 | Arena-Auditorium (4,230); Laramie, WY |
| 12/10/2010*; 8:00 pm | | at UC Irvine | L 68–83 | 3–6 | Bren Events Center (934); Irvine, CA |
| 12/14/2010*; 7:00 pm | | Denver | W 61–48 | 4–6 | Arena-Auditorium (3,851); Laramie, WY |
| 12/17/2010*; 7:00 pm | | Western State | W 80–37 | 5–6 | Arena-Auditorium (3,852); Laramie, WY |
| 12/20/2010*; 7:00 pm | | Centenary | W 76–49 | 6–6 | Arena-Auditorium (3,786); Laramie, WY |
| 12/22/2010*; 7:00 pm | | Green Bay | L 62–68 | 6–7 | Arena-Auditorium (3,806); Laramie, WY |
| 12/28/2010*; 7:00 pm | | Kennesaw State | W 68–55 | 7–7 | Arena-Auditorium (3,933); Laramie, WY |
| 01/04/2011; 7:00 pm, The Mtn. | | at Colorado State | L 60–73 | 7–8 (0–1) | Moby Arena (4,060); Fort Collins, CO |
| 01/08/2011; 4:00 pm, CBSCS | | New Mexico | W 67–66 | 8–8 (1–1) | Arena-Auditorium (4,404); Laramie, WY |
| 01/12/2011; 5:30 pm, The Mtn. | | at TCU | L 60–78 | 8–9 (1–2) | Daniel-Meyer Coliseum (3,914); Fort Worth, TX |
| 01/15/2011; 1:30 pm, The Mtn. | | Utah | L 51–68 | 8–10 (1–3) | Arena-Auditorium (4,670); Laramie, WY |
| 01/23/2011; 1:30 pm, The Mtn. | | at Air Force | L 51–72 | 8–11 (1–4) | Clune Arena (3,904); Colorado Springs, CO |
| 01/25/2011; 8:00 pm, The Mtn. | | UNLV | L 65–74 | 8–12 (1–5) | Arena-Auditorium (4,190); Laramie, WY |
| 01/29/2011; 8:00 pm, The Mtn. | | at No. 4 San Diego State | L 57–96 | 8–13 (1–6) | Viejas Arena (12,414); San Diego, CA |
| 02/02/2011; 6:00 pm, The Mtn. | | No. 8 BYU | L 62–69 | 8–14 (1–7) | Arena-Auditorium (5,131); Laramie, WY |
| 02/05/2011; 6:00 pm, CBSCS | | Colorado State | L 56–59 | 8–15 (1–8) | Arena-Auditorium (5,453); Laramie, WY |
| 02/09/2011; 6:00 pm, The Mtn. | | at New Mexico | L 57–68 | 8–16 (1–9) | The Pit (14,758); Albuquerque, NM |
| 02/12/2011; 1:30 pm, The Mtn. | | TCU | W 77–67 | 9–16 (2–9) | Arena-Auditorium (4,540); Laramie, WY |
| 02/16/2011; 7:00 pm, CBSCS | | at Utah | L 70–80 | 9–17 (2–10) | Jon M. Huntsman Center (8,275); Salt Lake City, UT |
| 02/23/2011; 8:00 pm, The Mtn. | | Air Force | W 63–61 | 10–17 (3–10) | Arena-Auditorium (4,262); Laramie, WY |
| 02/26/2011; 8:00 pm, The Mtn. | | at UNLV | L 77–90 | 10–18 (3–11) | Thomas & Mack Center (15,398); Paradise, NV |
| 03/01/2011; 8:00 pm, The Mtn. | | at No. 9 San Diego State | L 58–85 | 10–19 (3–12) | Arena-Auditorium (4,518); Laramie, WY |
| 03/05/2011; 1:30 pm, The Mtn. | | at No. 3 BYU | L 78–102 | 10–20 (3–13) | Marriott Center (22,700); Provo, UT |
Mountain West tournament
| 03/09/2011; 3:00 pm, The Mtn. | (8) | vs. (9) TCU; MWC First Round | L 61–70 | 10–21 | Thomas & Mack Center; Las Vegas, NV |
*Non-conference game. ^{#}Rankings from AP Poll. (#) Tournament seedings in parentheses. All times are in Mountain Time.
