= 2010–11 UNLV Runnin' Rebels basketball team =

American college basketball season

2010–11 UNLV Runnin' Rebels basketball

76 Classic Champions

NCAA Tournament, second round
- Conference: Mountain West Conference
- Record: 24–9 (11–5 Mountain West)
- Head coach: Lon Kruger
- Assistant coaches: Greg Grensing; Steve Henson; Lew Hill
- Home arena: Thomas & Mack Center

2010–11 Mountain West Conference men's basketball standings
	Conf.				Overall
Team	W		L	PCT	W		L	PCT
No. 6 San Diego St †	14	–	2	.875	34	–	3	.919
No. 12 BYU	14	–	2	.875	32	–	5	.865
UNLV	11	–	5	.688	24	–	9	.727
Colorado State	9	–	7	.563	19	–	13	.594
New Mexico	8	–	8	.500	22	–	13	.629
Air Force	6	–	10	.375	16	–	16	.500
Utah	6	–	10	.375	13	–	18	.419
Wyoming	3	–	13	.188	10	–	21	.323
TCU	1	–	15	.063	11	–	22	.333
† 2011 MWC tournament winner Rankings from AP/Coaches' Poll

The 2010–11 UNLV Runnin' Rebels basketball team represented the University of Nevada, Las Vegas. The team was coached by Lon Kruger, returning for his seventh year with the Runnin' Rebels. They played their home games at the Thomas & Mack Center on UNLV's main campus in Paradise, Nevada and were a member of the Mountain West Conference. They finished the season 24–9, 11–5 in Mountain West play, and lost in the semifinals of the 2011 Mountain West Conference men's basketball tournament to San Diego State. They received an at-large bid to the 2011 NCAA Division I men's basketball tournament, where they lost in the second round to Illinois.

== Roster ==
#	Name	Height	Weight (lbs.)	Position	Class	Hometown	Previous school
0	Oscar Bellfield	6'2"	185	G	Jr.	Los Angeles, CA	Westchester HS
1	Quintrell Thomas	6'8"	245	F	So.	Newark, NJ	Kansas
2	Kendall Wallace	6'4"	190	G	Sr.	Mesa, AZ	Mountain View HS
3	Anthony Marshall	6'3"	200	G	So.	Las Vegas, NV	Mojave HS
5	Derrick Jasper	6'6"	215	G	Sr.	Paso Robles, CA	Kentucky
10	Tyler Norman	6'0"	190	G	Sr.	Las Vegas, NV	Iowa State
11	Carlos Lopez	6'11"	215	F	Fr.	Lajas, Puerto Rico	Findlay Prep
12	Brice Massamba	6'10"	240	F/C	Jr.	Sodertalje, Sweden	Findlay Prep
15	Mychal Martinez	6'5"	205	F	Sr.	Las Vegas, NV	Yavapai
20	Karam Mashour	6'6"	200	G/F	Fr.	Nazareth, Israel	St. Joseph HS
22	Chase Stanback	6'8"	210	G/F	Jr.	Los Angeles, CA	UCLA
31	Justin Hawkins	6'3"	190	G	So.	Los Angeles, CA	Taft HS
33	Tre'Von Willis	6'4"	195	G	Sr.	Fresno, CA	Memphis
43	Mike Moser	6'8"	185	F	So.	Portland, OR	UCLA
44	Todd Hanni	6'4"	215	G	Jr.	Danville, IN	Wabash Valley

== Offseason ==
UNLV finished the 2009–2010 season with a 25–9 record, losing to Northern Iowa in the first round of the 2010 NCAA Division I men's basketball tournament, 69–66.

About a month later, it was announced that power forward Matt Shaw would be ineligible for his senior season because he had tested positive for a banned substance.

On July 6, Head Coach Lon Kruger announced that Mike Moser had transferred from UCLA.

On September 1, Kruger announced that Kendall Wallace would undergo knee surgery due to a torn ACL and would miss the entire season.

Four weeks later, senior guard Tre'Von Willis was suspended for at least 10% of the season due to a June 29 arrest by the Henderson Police Department. He was charged with domestic battery. He was sentenced to a 100 hours of community service and charged with a $325 fine.

The team's offseason ended with their first practice on October 18, 2010.

== Preview ==
The Runnin' Rebels were picked to finish fourth in the Mountain West Conference, behind defending conference tournament champion San Diego State Aztecs, the BYU Cougars led by preseason player of the year (Jimmer Fredette) and defending regular season champion, the New Mexico Lobos. Wills was also named to the preseason All-Team. UNLV received a first-place vote and 203 points.

== Rankings ==
Ranking movement Legend: ██ Increase in ranking. ██ Decrease in ranking. ██ Not ranked the previous week. RV–Received votes
Poll	Pre	Wk 1	Wk 2	Wk 3	Wk 4	Wk 5	Wk 6	Wk 7	Wk 8	Wk 9	Wk 10	Wk 11	Wk 12	Wk 13	Wk 14	Wk 15	Wk 16	Wk 17	Wk 18	Final
AP	–	RV	RV	24	20	22	RV	RV	25	RV										
Coaches	RV	RV	RV	23	19	22	RV	RV												

== Schedule and results ==
Date time, TV	Rank^{#}	Opponent^{#}	Result	Record	Site (attendance) city, state
Exhibition
11/02/2010*; 7:00 pm		Grand Canyon	W 90–66	—	Thomas & Mack Center (9,306); Paradise, NV
11/09/2010*; 7:00 pm		Washburn	W 88–53	—	Thomas & Mack Center (9,330); Paradise, NV
Regular season
11/12/2010*; 7:30 pm		UC Riverside	W 85–41	1–0	Thomas & Mack Center (12,970); Paradise, NV
11/17/2010*; 7:00 pm		Southeastern Louisiana	W 92–56	2–0	Thomas & Mack Center (10,334); Paradise, NV
11/20/2010*; 4:00 pm, Versus		Wisconsin	W 68–65	3–0	Thomas & Mack Center (14,736); Paradise, NV
11/25/2010*; 8:30 pm		vs. Tulsa; 76 Classic First Round	W 80–71	4–0	Anaheim Convention Center (2,089); Anaheim, CA
11/26/2010*; 6:30 pm, ESPNU		vs. Murray State; 76 Classic Semifinal	W 69–55	5–0	Anaheim Convention Center; Anaheim, CA
11/28/2010*; 6:00 pm, ESPN2		vs. Virginia Tech; 76 Classic Championship	W 71–59	6–0	Anaheim Convention Center (2,497); Anaheim, CA
12/01/2010*; 5:00 pm	No. 24	at Illinois State; MWC–MVC Challenge	W 82–51	7–0	Redbird Arena (6,485); Normal, IL
12/04/2010*; 8:00 pm	No. 24	at Nevada	W 82–70	8–0	Lawlor Events Center (5,967); Reno, NV
12/08/2010*; 7:00 pm	No. 20	vs. Boise State	W 75–72	9–0	Orleans Arena (8,320); Paradise, NV
12/11/2010*; 9:00 am, ESPNU	No. 20	at Louisville; Billy Minardi Classic	L 69–77	9–1	KFC Yum! Center (22,489); Louisville, KY
12/15/2010*; 7:00 pm	No. 22	UC Santa Barbara	L 62–68	9–2	Thomas & Mack Center (11,490); Paradise, NV
12/18/2010*; 7:00 pm, The Mtn.	No. 22	Southern Utah	W 72–50	10–2	Thomas & Mack Center (11,538); Paradise, NV
12/21/2010*; 6:00 pm, ESPN2		vs. No. 11 Kansas State; HyVee Wildcat Classic	W 63–59	11–2	Sprint Center (18,422); Kansas City, MO
12/30/2010*; 7:00 pm		Central Michigan	W 73–47	12–2	Thomas & Mack Center (13,157); Paradise, NV
01/05/2011; 7:00 pm, CBSCS	No. 25	No. 15 BYU	L 77–89	12–3 (0–1)	Thomas & Mack Center (17,942); Paradise, NV
01/08/2011; 7:00 pm, The Mtn.	No. 25	TCU	W 83–49	13–3 (1–1)	Thomas & Mack Center (12,155); Paradise, NV
01/12/2011; 7:00 pm, CBSCS		at No. 6 San Diego State	L 49–55	13–4 (1–2)	Viejas Arena (12,414); San Diego, CA
01/15/2011; 3:00 pm, The Mtn.		at Air Force	W 64–52	14–4 (2–2)	Clune Arena (3,031); Colorado Springs, CO
01/19/2011; 7:30 pm, The Mtn.		Colorado State	L 63–78	14–5 (2–3)	Thomas & Mack Center (11,266); Paradise, NV
01/22/2011; 1:00 pm, Versus		New Mexico	W 63–62	15–5 (3–3)	Thomas & Mack Center (13,843); Paradise, NV
01/25/2011; 1:00 pm, The Mtn.		at Wyoming	W 74–65	16–5 (4–3)	Arena-Auditorium (4,190); Laramie, WY
02/02/2011; 7:30 pm, The Mtn.		Utah	W 67–54	17–5 (5–3)	Thomas & Mack Center (11,842); Paradise, NV
02/05/2011; 1:00 pm, Versus		at No. 8 BYU	L 64–78	17–6 (5–4)	Marriott Center (22,700); Provo, UT
02/09/2011; 5:00 pm, The Mtn.		at TCU	W 94–79	18–6 (6–4)	Daniel–Meyer Coliseum (3,813); Fort Worth, TX
02/12/2011; 5:00 pm, CBSCS		No. 6 San Diego State	L 57–63	18–7 (6–5)	Thomas & Mack Center (18,557); Paradise, NV
02/15/2011; 7:30 pm, The Mtn.		Air Force	W 49–42	19–7 (7–5)	Thomas & Mack Center (10,928); Paradise, NV
02/19/2011; 4:00 pm, The Mtn.		at Colorado State	W 68–61	20–7 (8–5)	Moby Arena (8,745); Fort Collins, CO
02/23/2011; 6:00 pm, CBSCS		at New Mexico	W 77–74 ^{OT}	21–7 (9–5)	The Pit (15,346); Albuquerque, NM
02/26/2011; 7:00 pm, The Mtn.		Wyoming	W 90–72	22–7 (10–5)	Thomas & Mack Center (15,398); Paradise, NV
03/05/2011; 1:00 pm, Versus		at Utah	W 78–58	23–7 (11–5)	Jon M. Huntsman Center (9,969); Salt Lake City, UT
Mountain West tournament
03/10/2011; 8:30 pm, The Mtn.	(3)	(6) Air Force; MWC Quarterfinals	W 69–53	24–7	Thomas & Mack Center (12,325); Paradise, NV
03/11/2011; 8:30 pm, CBSCS	(3)	(2) No. 6 San Diego State; MWC Semifinals	L 72–74	24–8	Thomas & Mack Center (18,500); Paradise, NV
NCAA tournament
03/18/2011*; 6:20 pm, TBS	(8 SW)	vs. (9 SW) Illinois; NCAA Second Round	L 62–73	24–9	BOK Center (14,353); Tulsa, OK
*Non-conference game. ^{#}Rankings from AP Poll/Coaches' Poll. (#) Tournament seedings in parentheses. SW=NCAA Southwest Regional. All times are in Pacific Time.

== See also ==
- 2010–11 NCAA Division I men's basketball season
- 2010–11 NCAA Division I men's basketball rankings
