= 2010–11 BYU Cougars men's basketball team =

American college basketball season

2010–11 BYU Cougars men's basketball

South Padre Island Invitational Champions Mountain West Regular Season Co-Champions

NCAA tournament, Sweet Sixteen
- Conference: Mountain West Conference

Ranking
- Coaches: No. 13
- AP: No. 10
- Record: 32–5 (14–2 Mountain West)
- Head coach: Dave Rose (6th season)
- Assistant coaches: Dave Rice; Terry Nashif; Tim LaComb
- Home arena: Marriott Center

2010–11 Mountain West Conference men's basketball standings
	Conf.				Overall
Team	W		L	PCT	W		L	PCT
No. 6 San Diego St †	14	–	2	.875	34	–	3	.919
No. 12 BYU	14	–	2	.875	32	–	5	.865
UNLV	11	–	5	.688	24	–	9	.727
Colorado State	9	–	7	.563	19	–	13	.594
New Mexico	8	–	8	.500	22	–	13	.629
Air Force	6	–	10	.375	16	–	16	.500
Utah	6	–	10	.375	13	–	18	.419
Wyoming	3	–	13	.188	10	–	21	.323
TCU	1	–	15	.063	11	–	22	.333
† 2011 MWC tournament winner Rankings from AP/Coaches' Poll

The 2010–11 BYU Cougars men's basketball team represented Brigham Young University in the 2010–11 college basketball season. This was head coach Dave Rose's sixth season at BYU. The Cougars, in their final season in the Mountain West Conference, played their home games at the Marriott Center. The Cougars ended regular season play as co-champions with San Diego State, and were the only team to defeat the Aztecs in regular-season play. Led by combo guard Jimmer Fredette, the nation's leading scorer and consensus national player of the year, the Cougars advanced to the Sweet Sixteen of the NCAA tournament, where they lost in overtime to Florida.

This was the Cougars' final season as a member of the Mountain West as their basketball team became a member of the West Coast Conference in July 2011.

== Roster ==
2010–11 BYU Cougars men's basketball team
Players
Coaches

Pos.	#	Name	Height	Weight	Year	Previous school	Hometown
F	0	Brandon Davies	6 ft 9 in (2.06 m)	235 lb (107 kg)	So	Provo	Provo, UT
G/F	1	Charles Abouo	6 ft 5 in (1.96 m)	215 lb (98 kg)	Jr	Brewster Academy	Abidjan, Ivory Coast
G	4	Jackson Emery	6 ft 3 in (1.91 m)	190 lb (86 kg)	Sr	Lone Peak	Alpine, UT
F	12	Logan Magnusson	6 ft 6 in (1.98 m)	210 lb (95 kg)	Sr	Wasatch; Salt Lake CC	Heber City, UT
G/F	13	Brock Zylstra	6 ft 6 in (1.98 m)	210 lb (95 kg)	So	Bonita	La Verne, CA
G	14	Nick Martineau	6 ft 1 in (1.85 m)	170 lb (77 kg)	Fr	Davis	Fruit Heights, UT
F/C	15	James Anderson	6 ft 10 in (2.08 m)	240 lb (109 kg)	Jr	Page	Page, AZ
G	20	Anson Winder	6 ft 3 in (1.91 m)	195 lb (88 kg)	Fr	Bishop Gorman	Las Vegas, NV
F	21	Stephen Rogers	6 ft 8 in (2.03 m)	195 lb (88 kg)	So	Mountain View; Mesa CC	Mesa, AZ
G	31	Kyle Collinsworth	6 ft 6 in (1.98 m)	210 lb (95 kg)	Fr	Provo	Provo, UT
G	32	Jimmer Fredette	6 ft 2 in (1.88 m)	195 lb (88 kg)	Sr	Glens Falls	Glens Falls, NY
G	33	Matt Carlino	6 ft 1 in (1.85 m)	175 lb (79 kg)	Jr	Bloomington South (IN)	Arcadia, AZ
F	34	Noah Hartsock	6 ft 8 in (2.03 m)	230 lb (104 kg)	Jr	Bartlesville	Bartlesville, OK
F	41	Chris Collinsworth	6 ft 9 in (2.06 m)	235 lb (107 kg)	So	Provo	Provo, UT

Head coach

- Dave Rose (Houston)

Assistant coach(es)

- Dave Rice (UNLV)
- Terry Nashif (BYU)
- Tim LaComb (Utah)

Legend

- (C) Team captain
- (S) Suspended
- (I) Ineligible
- (W) Walk-on
- Injured
- Current redshirt

Roster

== Schedule and results ==
Date time, TV	Rank^{#}	Opponent^{#}	Result	Record	Site (attendance) city, state
Exhibition
October 29, 2010*; 7:05 pm	No. 24	Laval	W 101–55	—	Marriott Center (8,583); Provo, UT
November 5, 2010*; 7:05 pm, BYU TV	No. 24	BYU–Hawaii	W 85–60	–	Marriott Center (10,753); Provo, UT
Regular Season
November 12, 2010*; 7:00 pm	No. 24	Fresno State	W 83–56	1–0	Marriott Center (22,700); Provo, UT
November 17, 2010*; 7:00 pm, The Mtn.	No. 23	Utah State; Old Oquirrh Bucket	W 78–72	2–0	Marriott Center (17,303); Provo, UT
November 20, 2010*; 8:00 pm, BYU TV	No. 23	at Chicago State; South Padre Island Invitational	W 109–60	3–0	Marriott Center (11,544); Provo, UT
November 23, 2010*; 7:00 pm, BYU TV	No. 23	Mississippi Valley State; South Padre Island Invitational	W 86–36	4–0	Marriott Center (9,207); Provo, UT
November 26, 2010*; 5:00 pm, FCS	No. 23	vs. South Florida; South Padre Island Invitational	W 77–75 ^{2OT}	5–0	South Padre Island Convention Centre (1,100); South Padre Island, TX
November 27, 2010*; 7:00 pm, FCS	No. 23	vs. Saint Mary's; South Padre Island Invitational	W 74–73	6–0	South Padre Island Convention Centre (1,300); South Padre Island, TX
December 1, 2010*; 7:00 pm, KMTV	No. 21	at Creighton; MWC-MVC Challenge	W 77–65	7–0	Qwest Center Omaha (15,532); Omaha, NE
December 4, 2010*; 4:00 pm, BYU TV/KJZZ	No. 21	vs. Hawaii	W 78–57	8–0	EnergySolutions Arena (13,312); Salt Lake City, UT
December 8, 2010*; 7:00 pm, CBSCS	No. 18	vs. Vermont; Hometown Classic	W 86–58	9–0	Glens Falls Civic Center (6,300); Glens Falls, NY
December 11, 2010*; 4:00 pm, BYU TV/KJZZ	No. 18	vs. Arizona	W 87–65	10–0	EnergySolutions Arena (15,814); Salt Lake City, UT
December 18, 2010*; 2:30 pm, FSN	No. 16	vs. UCLA; John R. Wooden Classic	L 79–86	10–1	Honda Center (NA); Anaheim, CA
December 21, 2010*; 7:00 pm	No. 23	at Weber State; Old Oquirrh Bucket	W 72–66	11–1	Dee Events Center (10,453); Ogden, UT
December 23, 2010*; 7:05 pm	No. 23	UTEP	W 89–68	12–1	Marriott Center (13,403); Provo, UT
December 30, 2010*; 7:00 pm	No. 16	at Buffalo	W 90–82	13–1	Alumni Arena (5,803); Buffalo, NY
January 1, 2011*; 7:05 pm	No. 16	Fresno Pacific	W 93–57	14–1	Marriott Center (12,762); Provo, UT
January 5, 2011; 7:00 pm, CBSCS	No. 15	at No. 25 UNLV	W 89–77	15–1 (1–0)	Thomas & Mack Center (17,942); Paradise, NV
January 8, 2011; 1:00 pm, The Mtn.	No. 15	Air Force	W 76–66	16–1 (2–0)	Marriott Center (22,700); Provo, UT
January 11, 2011; 6:30 pm, The Mtn.	No. 11	at Utah; Old Oquirrh Bucket	W 104–79	17–1 (3–0)	Jon M. Huntsman Center (11,243); Salt Lake City, UT
January 18, 2011; 8:00 pm, The Mtn.	No. 9	TCU	W 83–67	18–1 (4–0)	Marriott Center (16,170); Provo, UT
January 22, 2011; 7:00 pm, The Mtn.	No. 9	at Colorado State	W 94–85	19–1 (5–0)	Moby Arena (8,745); Fort Collins, CO
January 26, 2011; 8:15 pm, CBSCS	No. 9	No. 4 San Diego State	W 71–58	20–1 (6–0)	Marriott Center (22,700); Provo, UT
January 29, 2011; 2:00 pm, Versus	No. 9	at New Mexico	L 77–86	20–2 (6–1)	The Pit (15,411); Albuquerque, NM
February 2, 2011; 6:02 pm, The Mtn.	No. 8	at Wyoming	W 69–62	21–2 (7–1)	Arena-Auditorium (5,131); Laramie, WY
February 5, 2011; 2:00 pm, Versus	No. 8	UNLV	W 78–63	22–2 (8–1)	Marriott Center (22,700); Provo, UT
February 9, 2011; 8:00 pm, The Mtn.	No. 7	at Air Force	W 90–52	23–2 (9–1)	Clune Arena (6,028); Colorado Springs, CO
February 12, 2011; 4:00 pm, The Mtn.	No. 7	Utah; Old Oquirrh Bucket	W 72–59	24–2 (10–1)	Marriott Center (22,700); Provo, UT
February 19, 2011; 3:30 pm, The Mtn.	No. 7	at TCU	W 79–56	25–2 (11–1)	Daniel–Meyer Coliseum (7,258); Fort Worth, TX
February 23, 2011; 6:00 pm, The Mtn.	No. 7	Colorado State	W 84–76	26–2 (12–1)	Marriott Center (22,700); Provo, UT
February 26, 2011; 11:05 am, CBS	No. 7	at No. 4 San Diego State	W 80–67	27–2 (13–1)	Viejas Arena (12,414); San Diego, CA
March 2, 2011; 8:00 pm, The Mtn.	No. 3	New Mexico	L 62–84	27–3 (13–2)	Marriott Center (22,700); Provo, UT
March 5, 2011; 1:30 pm, The Mtn.	No. 3	Wyoming	W 102–78	28–3 (14–2)	Marriott Center (22,700); Provo, UT
Mountain West tournament
March 10, 2011; 1:00 pm, The Mtn.	(1) No. 8	vs. (9) TCU; MWC Quarterfinals	W 64–58	29–3	Thomas & Mack Center (14,697); Paradise, NV
March 11, 2011; 7:00 pm, CBSCS	(1) No. 8	vs. (5) New Mexico; MWC Semifinals	W 87–76	30–3	Thomas & Mack Center (18,500); Paradise, NV
March 12, 2011; 7:00 pm, Versus	(1) No. 8	vs. (2) No. 7 San Diego State; MWC Championship Game	L 54–72	30–4	Thomas & Mack Center (18,500); Paradise, NV
NCAA Tournament
March 17, 2011*; 5:15 pm, CBS	(3 SE) No. 10	vs. (14 SE) Wofford; NCAA Second Round	W 74–66	31–4	Pepsi Center (19,216); Denver, CO
March 19, 2011*; 5:55 pm, CBS	(3 SE) No. 10	vs. (11 SE) Gonzaga; NCAA Third Round	W 89–67	32–4	Pepsi Center (19,328); Denver, CO
March 24, 2011*; 5:27 pm, TBS	(3 SE) No. 10	vs. (2 SE) No. 15 Florida; NCAA Sweet Sixteen	L 74–83 ^{OT}	32–5	New Orleans Arena (12,320); New Orleans, LA
*Non-conference game. ^{#}Rankings from AP Poll. (#) Tournament seedings in parentheses. SE=Southeast.

== Rankings ==
Ranking movements Legend: ██ Increase in ranking ██ Decrease in ranking RV = Received votes т = Tied with team above or below ( ) = First-place votes
	Week																			
Poll	Pre	1	2	3	4	5	6	7	8	9	10	11	12	13	14	15	16	17	18	Final
AP	24	23	23	21	18	16	23	16	15	11	9	9т	8	7	7	7 (2)	3 (5)	8	10	Not released
Coaches	RV	RV	RV	25	21	18	23	16	14	10	9	9	9	8	8	7	3	8	12	13

*AP does not release post-NCAA Tournament rankings.

The team has consistently been ranked higher in computer rankings such as Jeff Sagarin's than in the AP and Coaches Polls. On November 13, 2010 they were ranked 2 in Sagarin's rankings, while they were ranked as high as 1 in Ratings Percentage Index (RPI) on January 9 and 24, 2011, as well as on February 15 and 28, 2011.

== Davies controversy ==
Sophomore starting forward Brandon Davies was dismissed from the team on March 1, 2011 for the remainder of the season for a violation of the school's honor code. The Salt Lake Tribune published that the transgression involved the provision that prohibits premarital sex. This led to a media frenzy in which the Honor Code was spotlighted and debated, particularly because Davies had not committed a criminal act, or even an NCAA violation, but instead a violation of Latter-day Saint and school ethics. Davies had started 26 of 29 games for the Cougars, averaging 11.1 points and a team-leading 6.2 rebounds. At the time, BYU had a 27-2 record and ranked No. 3 nationally, while analyst Joe Lunardi of ESPN.com had projected the Cougars as the No. 1 seed in the West region for the 2011 NCAA tournament. After Davies' suspension, Lunardi maintained his stance that BYU should be a No. 1 seed as long as they continued to perform. The Cougars lost their next game 82–64 to New Mexico (19–11), who beat BYU for the second time in the season, but quickly recovered in a 102-78 victory over Wyoming.
