= 2010–11 New Mexico Lobos men's basketball team =

American college basketball season

2010–11 New Mexico Lobos men's basketball

NIT, Second Round
- Conference: Mountain West Conference
- Record: 22–13 (8–8 Mountain West)
- Head coach: Steve Alford (4th Year)
- Assistant coaches: Craig Neal (4th Year); Wyking Jones; Ryan Miller (4th Year)
- Home arena: The Pit (Capacity: 17,126)

2010–11 Mountain West Conference men's basketball standings
	Conf.				Overall
Team	W		L	PCT	W		L	PCT
No. 6 San Diego St †	14	–	2	.875	34	–	3	.919
No. 12 BYU	14	–	2	.875	32	–	5	.865
UNLV	11	–	5	.688	24	–	9	.727
Colorado State	9	–	7	.563	19	–	13	.594
New Mexico	8	–	8	.500	22	–	13	.629
Air Force	6	–	10	.375	16	–	16	.500
Utah	6	–	10	.375	13	–	18	.419
Wyoming	3	–	13	.188	10	–	21	.323
TCU	1	–	15	.063	11	–	22	.333
† 2011 MWC tournament winner Rankings from AP/Coaches' Poll

The 2010–11 New Mexico Lobos men's basketball team represented the University of New Mexico as a member of the Mountain West Conference. The Lobos were coached by fourth-year head coach Steve Alford and played their home games at The Pit in Albuquerque, New Mexico.

The Lobos were 2–2 against ranked teams.

== Recruiting ==
College recruiting information
Name	Hometown	School	Height	Weight	Commit date
Alex Kirk; C	Los Alamos, NM	Los Alamos High School	6 ft 11 in (2.11 m)	220 lb (100 kg)	Jan 1, 2010
Alex Kirk; C	Recruit ratings: Scout: Rivals: (93)				
Kendall Williams; PG	Rancho Cucamonga, CA	Los Osos High School	6 ft 2 in (1.88 m)	160 lb (73 kg)	Mar 3, 2010
Kendall Williams; PG	Recruit ratings: Scout: Rivals: (91)				
Tony Snell; SG	Riverside, CA	Westwind Prep Academy	6 ft 7 in (2.01 m)	190 lb (86 kg)	Jan 1, 2010
Tony Snell; SG	Recruit ratings: Scout: Rivals: (92)				
Overall Recruiting Rankings:

=== Other arrivals ===
The Lobos also received 3 transfers for this season. Drew Gordon transferred from UCLA, Demetrius Walker transferred from ASU and Emmanuel Negedu from Tennessee.

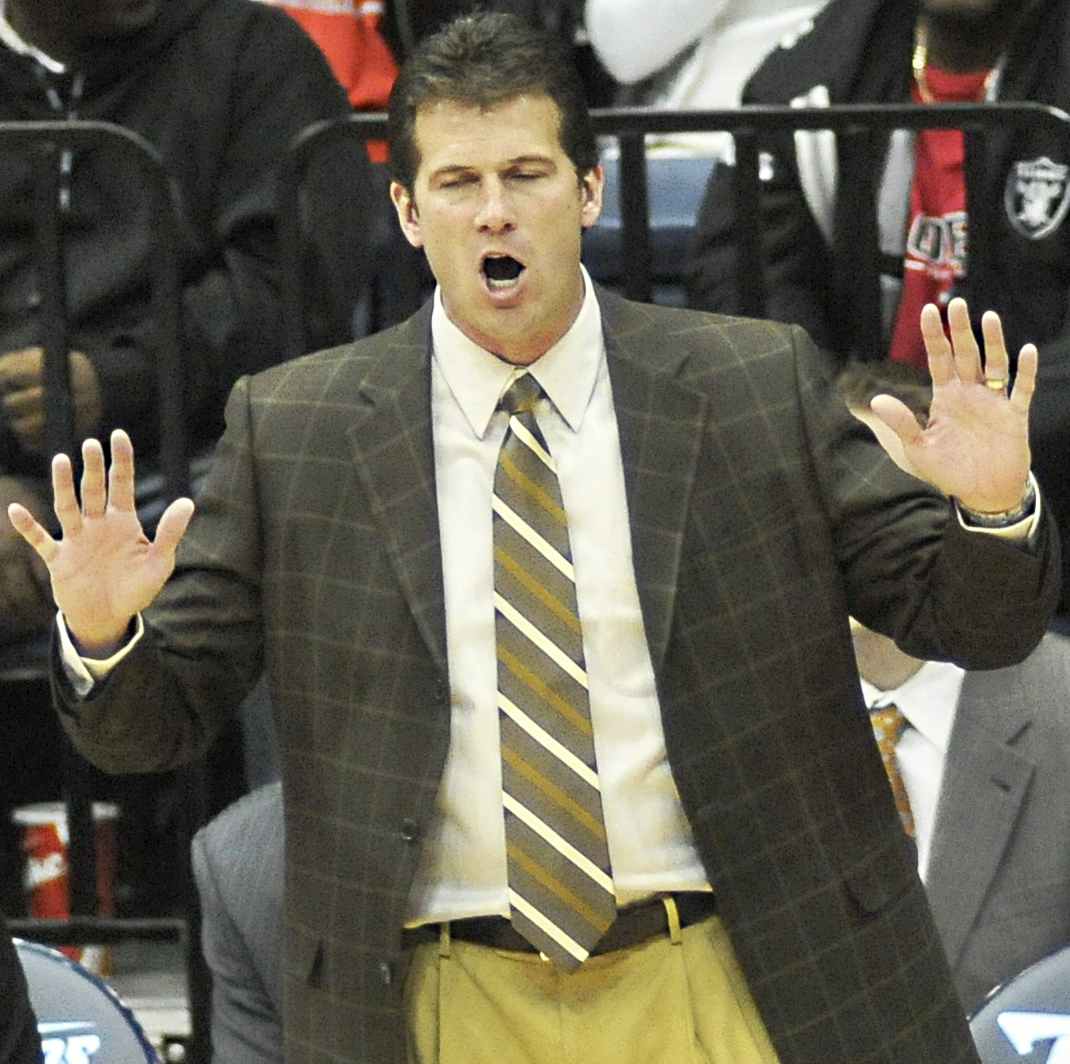
Lobo's Coach Steve Alford

=== Departures ===
The Lobos lost Senior Roman Martinez and freshman Darington Hobson, both averaged over 14 points a game.

=== Coach Steve Alford Stays ===
Coach Steve Alford was rumored to be leaving after the 2009–10 season, the lobos were ranked #8 nationally and the 30–5 season was the best in school history. Coach Alford agreed to a contract that would keep him at UNM till the year 2020. "I want to be here as long as the University of New Mexico and the administration want me here," Alford said. "It's a big-time commitment on both ends, and this contract proves that." UNM is 76–26 in Alford's three years.

== Roster ==
2010–11 Roster
Name	Number	Pos.	Height	Weight	Year	Hometown	High School/Last College
A. J. Hardeman	00	F	6' 8"	225	Junior	Del Valle, Texas	Del Valle High School
Emmanuel Negedu	1	F	6' 7"	220	Sophomore	Kaduna, Nigeria	Tennessee
Chris Perez	2	G	6' 0"	170	Freshman	Corona, California	Centennial High School
Curtis Dennis	3	G	6' 5"	195	Sophomore	Bronx, New York	Findlay Prep
Chad Adams	4	F	6' 6"	190	Sophomore	Albuquerque, New Mexico	Highland High School
Dairese Gary	5	G	6' 1"	205	Senior	Elkhart, Indiana	Concord High School
Kendall Williams	10	G	6' 3"	170	Freshman	Rancho Cucamonga, California	Los Osos High School
Jamal Fenton	13	G	5' 9"	170	Sophomore	Houston, Texas	Cesar E. Chavez High School
Tony Snell	21	G	6' 7"	195	Freshman	Riverside, California	King High School
Phillip McDonald	23	G	6' 5"	200	Junior	Cypress, Texas	Cypress Springs High School
Drew Gordon	32	F	6' 9"	245	Junior	San Jose, California	UCLA
Demetrius Walker	40	G	6' 2"	195	Sophomore	Fontana, California	Arizona State
Cameron Bairstow	41	F	6' 9"	230	Freshman	Brisbane, Australia	Australian Institute of Sports
Alex Kirk	53	C	6' 11"	230	Freshman	Los Alamos, New Mexico	Los Alamos High School

== Rankings ==
Ranking movement Legend: ██ Increase in ranking. ██ Decrease in ranking. ██ Not ranked the previous week.
Poll	Pre	Wk 1	Wk 2	Wk 3	Wk 4	Wk 5	Wk 6	Wk 7	Wk 8	Wk 9	Wk 10	Wk 11	Wk 12	Wk 13	Wk 14	Wk 15	Wk 16	Wk 17	Wk 18	Final
AP	RV	RV	NR	NR	NR	RV	RV	NR	NR	NR	NR	NR								
Coaches	RV	RV	RV	RV	RV	RV	RV	RV	NR	NR	NR	NR								

== 2010–11 Schedule ==
- All times are Mountain

Date time, TV	Rank^{#}	Opponent^{#}	Result	Record	Site (attendance) city, state
Exhibition
11/03/2010*; 7:00 pm, KASY		Eastern New Mexico	W 80–58	—	The Pit (14,597); Albuquerque, NM
11/06/2010*; 7:00 pm, KASY		Manchester	W 107–62	—	The Pit (14,707); Albuquerque, NM
Regular season
11/13/2010*; 7:00 pm		Detroit	W 63–54	1–0	The Pit (15,145); Albuquerque, NM
11/16/2010*; 7:00 pm, Versus		Arizona State	W 76–62	2–0	The Pit (15,239); Albuquerque, NM
11/20/2010*; 8:00 pm		at California	L 64–89	2–1	Haas Pavilion (7,158); Berkeley, CA
11/24/2010*; 7:00 pm		Northwood	W 78–56	3–1	The Pit (14,542); Albuquerque, NM
11/28/2010*; 1:00 pm, KASY		San Diego	W 75–46	4–1	The Pit (14,661); Albuquerque, NM
12/01/2010*; 7:00 pm		at Southern Illinois; MWC-MVC Challenge	W 74–59	5–1	SIU Arena (4,531); Carbondale, IL
12/04/2010*; 7:00 pm, AggieVision		at New Mexico State; Rio Grande Rivalry	W 84–78 ^{OT}	6–1	Pan American Center (8,205); Las Cruces, NM
12/11/2010*; 7:00 pm, The Mtn.		New Mexico State; Rio Grande Rivalry	W 78–62	7–1	The Pit (15,920); Albuquerque, NM
12/17/2010*; 7:00 pm, KASY		Longwood; IBN Las Vegas Classic	W 91–54	8–1	The Pit (14,444); Albuquerque, NM
12/19/2010*; 1:00 pm, KASY		The Citadel; IBN Las Vegas Classic	W 84–58	9–1	The Pit (14,640); Albuquerque, NM
12/22/2010*; 7:00 pm, CBSCS		vs. Colorado; IBN Las Vegas Classic Semifinals	W 89–76	10–1	Orleans Arena (2,867); Paradise, NV
12/23/2010*; 5:30 pm, CBSCS		vs. Northern Iowa; IBN Las Vegas Classic Finals	L 60–66	10–2	Orleans Arena (3,725); Paradise, NV
12/29/2010*; 7:00 pm, KASY		at Texas Tech	W 61–60	11–2	United Spirit Arena (9,585); Lubbock, TX
01/01/2011*; 12:00 pm, CBSCS		at Dayton	L 73–76 ^{2OT}	11–3	UD Arena (12,804); Dayton, OH
01/05/2011*; 7:00 pm, KASY		Cal State Bakersfield	W 102–62	12–3	The Pit (14,045); Albuquerque, NM
01/08/2011; 4:00 pm, CBSCS		at Wyoming	L 66–67	12–4 (0–1)	Arena-Auditorium (4,404); Laramie, WY
01/12/2011; 8:00 pm, The Mtn.		Colorado State	W 68–61	13–4 (1–1)	The Pit (14,303); Albuquerque, NM
01/15/2011; 4:00 pm, CBSCS		No. 6 San Diego State	L 77–87	13–5 (1–2)	The Pit (15,411); Albuquerque, NM
01/19/2011; 5:00 pm, The Mtn.		at Utah	L 72–82	13–6 (1–3)	Jon M. Huntsman Center (8,717); Salt Lake City, UT
01/22/2011; 2:00 pm, Versus		at UNLV	L 62–63	13–7 (1–4)	Thomas & Mack Center (13,843); Paradise, NV
01/26/2011; 8:00 pm, The Mtn.		TCU	W 71–46	14–7 (2–4)	The Pit (14,411); Albuquerque, NM
01/29/2011; 2:00 pm, Versus		No. 9 BYU	W 86–77	15–7 (3–4)	The Pit (15,411); Albuquerque, NM
02/01/2011; 6:00 pm, The Mtn.		at Air Force	W 75–61	16–7 (4–4)	Clune Arena (2,296); Colorado Springs, CO
02/09/2011; 6:00 pm, The Mtn.		Wyoming	W 68–57	17–7 (5–4)	The Pit (14,758); Albuquerque, NM
02/12/2011; 8:00 pm, The Mtn.		at Colorado State	L 62–68	17–8 (5–5)	Moby Arena (6,425); Fort Collins, CO
02/16/2011; 8:30 pm, The Mtn.		at No. 6 San Diego State	L 62–68	17–9 (5–6)	Viejas Arena (12,414); San Diego, CA
02/19/2011; 7:30 pm, The Mtn.		Utah	L 60–62	17–10 (5–7)	The Pit (15,333); Albuquerque, NM
02/23/2011; 7:00 pm, CBSCS		UNLV	L 74–77 ^{OT}	17–11 (5–8)	The Pit (15,346); Albuquerque, NM
02/26/2011; 6:00 pm, CBSCS		at TCU	W 80–70	18–11 (6–8)	Daniel–Meyer Coliseum (6,032); Fort Worth, TX
03/02/2011; 8:00 pm, The Mtn.		at No. 3 BYU	W 82–64	19–11 (7–8)	Marriott Center (22,700); Provo, UT
03/05/2011; 4:00 pm, The Mtn.		Air Force	W 66–61	20–11 (8–8)	The Pit (15,344); Albuquerque, NM
Mountain West tournament
03/10/2011; 3:30 pm, The Mtn.	(5)	vs. (4) Colorado State; Mountain West Quarterfinals	W 67–61	21–11	Thomas & Mack Center (14,697); Paradise, NV
03/11/2011; 7:00 pm, CBSCS	(5)	vs. (1) No. 8 BYU; Mountain West Semifinals	L 76–87	21–12	Thomas & Mack Center (18,500); Paradise, NV
NIT
03/15/2011*; 7:00 pm, ESPN2	(4 A)	(5 A) UTEP; NIT First Round	W 69–57	22–12	The Pit (9,626); Albuquerque, NM
03/21/2011*; 7:00 pm, ESPN	(4 A)	at (1 A) Alabama; NIT Second Round	L 67–74	22–13	Coleman Coliseum (6,821); Tuscaloosa, AL
*Non-conference game. ^{#}Rankings from AP Poll. (#) Tournament seedings in parentheses. A=NIT Alabama bracket.
