= 2011 Mountain West Conference men's basketball tournament =

- MWC Tournament logo
- Classification: Division I
- Season: 2010–11
- Teams: 9
- Site: Thomas & Mack Center; Paradise, NV
- Champions: San Diego State (4th title)
- Winning coach: Steve Fisher (4th title)
- MVP: Jimmer Fredette
- Television: The Mtn., CBSCS, Versus

2010–11 Mountain West Conference men's basketball standings
	Conf.				Overall
Team	W		L	PCT	W		L	PCT
No. 6 San Diego St †	14	–	2	.875	34	–	3	.919
No. 12 BYU	14	–	2	.875	32	–	5	.865
UNLV	11	–	5	.688	24	–	9	.727
Colorado State	9	–	7	.563	19	–	13	.594
New Mexico	8	–	8	.500	22	–	13	.629
Air Force	6	–	10	.375	16	–	16	.500
Utah	6	–	10	.375	13	–	18	.419
Wyoming	3	–	13	.188	10	–	21	.323
TCU	1	–	15	.063	11	–	22	.333
† 2011 MWC tournament winner Rankings from AP/Coaches' Poll

The 2011 Mountain West Conference men's basketball tournament was played at the Thomas & Mack Center in Las Vegas, Nevada from March 8–12, 2011. The tournament is sponsored by Conoco. The first round game and all four quarterfinals were televised live on the MountainWest Sports Network. The semifinals were televised on CBS College Sports Network, with the championship game on Versus. San Diego State, the winner of the tournament, received the automatic bid to the NCAA tournament. BYU's Jimmer Fredette was selected as the tournament MVP.

== Bracket ==
First round Wednesday, March 9
8	Wyoming	61
9	TCU	70

Quarterfinals; Thursday, March 10
1	#8 BYU	64
9	TCU	58
4	Colorado State	61
5	New Mexico	67
3	UNLV	69
6	Air Force	53
2	#7 San Diego State	64
7	Utah	50

Semifinals; Friday, March 11
1	#8 BYU	87
5	New Mexico	76
3	UNLV	72
2	#7 San Diego State	74

Championship; Saturday, March 12
1	#8 BYU	54
2	#7 San Diego State	72
