= 2010–11 Mountain West Conference men's basketball season =

- League: NCAA Division I
- Sport: Basketball
- Duration: January 4, 2009 – March 5, 2011
- Teams: 9
- TV partner(s): MountainWest Sports Network, CBS College Sports Network and Versus

Regular Season
- Season champions: BYU & San Diego State
- Season MVP: Jimmer Fredette
- Top scorer: Jimmer Fredette

Tournament
- Champions: San Diego State
- Runners-up: BYU
- Finals MVP: Jimmer Fredette

Basketball seasons
- ← 2009–10 2011–12 →

2010–11 Mountain West Conference men's basketball standings
	Conf.				Overall
Team	W		L	PCT	W		L	PCT
No. 6 San Diego St †	14	–	2	.875	34	–	3	.919
No. 12 BYU	14	–	2	.875	32	–	5	.865
UNLV	11	–	5	.688	24	–	9	.727
Colorado State	9	–	7	.563	19	–	13	.594
New Mexico	8	–	8	.500	22	–	13	.629
Air Force	6	–	10	.375	16	–	16	.500
Utah	6	–	10	.375	13	–	18	.419
Wyoming	3	–	13	.188	10	–	21	.323
TCU	1	–	15	.063	11	–	22	.333
† 2011 MWC tournament winner Rankings from AP/Coaches' Poll

The 2010–11 Mountain West Conference men's basketball season was the 12th season of Mountain West Conference basketball. This was the final season for the two Utah schools in the conference. BYU became a member of the West Coast Conference in most sports, including basketball, while its football program became independent. Utah joined the Pacific-10 Conference, which changed its name to the Pac-12 with Colorado also joining from the Big 12 Conference. The Mountain West welcomed new members as well, with Boise State joining in 2011 and Fresno State and Nevada following in 2012. The Brigham Young University Cougars and San Diego State men's basketball teams ended the regular season as co-champions. San Diego State earned the conference's automatic bid to the NCAA tournament by defeating BYU in the conference tournament. BYU and UNLV secured at-large bids into the tournament. Both BYU and SDSU reached the Sweet Sixteen round but were also eliminated in that round.

== Preseason ==
The Mountain West Conference held its pre-season media day on October 12, 2010 at the MountainWest Sports Network studios in Denver, Colorado.

=== Mountain West Media Poll ===
Rank	Team	Votes
1	San Diego State (21)	261
2	BYU (5)	220
3	New Mexico (3)	214
4	UNLV	203
5	Colorado State	132
6	Utah	105
7	TCU	92
8	Wyoming	88
9	Air Force	35

=== awards ===
Preseason All-MWC team

- Jimmer Fredette, BYU
- Dairese Gary, New Mexico
- Kawhi Leonard, San Diego State
- Malcolm Thomas, San Diego State
- Tre'Von Willis, UNLV

Preseason Player of the Year

- Jimmer Fredette, BYU

Preseason Newcomer of the Year

- Drew Gordon, Jr., New Mexico

Preseason Freshman of the Year

- Kyle Collinsworth, BYU

Postseason All-MWC team

- Jimmer Fredette, BYU
- Andy Ogide, Colorado State
- Dairese Gary, New Mexico
- D. J. Gay, San Diego State
- Kawhi Leonard, San Diego State

Player of the year

- Jimmer Fredette, BYU

Newcomer of the Year

- Drew Gordon Jr., New Mexico

Freshman of the Year

- Kendall Williams, New Mexico

== Regular season ==
=== Rankings ===
2010–11 Mountain West Conference Weekly Top 25 Rankings Key: ██ Increase in ranking. ██ Decrease in ranking. RV = Received Votes
Coaches Poll	Pre	Wk 1	Wk 2	Wk 3	Wk 4	Wk 5	Wk 6	Wk 7	Wk 8	Wk 9	Wk 10	Wk 11	Wk 12	Wk 13	Wk 14	Wk 15	Wk 16	Wk 17	Wk 18	Final
Air Force																				
Brigham Young	RV	RV	RV	25	21	18	23	16	14	10	9	9	9	8	8	7	3	8		
Colorado State																				
New Mexico	RV	RV	RV	RV	RV	RV	RV													
San Diego State	RV	RV	22	19	15	10	7	7	6	6	6	4	6	6	6	4	9	6		
Texas Christian																				
UNLV	RV	RV	RV	23	19	22	RV	RV	RV	RV	RV	RV	RV	RV						
Utah																				
Wyoming																				

=== Weekly awards ===
MWC Player of the Week
Throughout the conference season, the MWC offices named one player of the week.

Week	Player of the week
November 15	Kawhi Leonard, SDSU
November 22	Kawhi Leonard, SDSU
November 29	Jimmer Fredette, BYU, and Chace Stanback, UNLV
December 6	Malcolm Thomas, SDSU
December 13	Jimmer Fredette, BYU
December 20	Malcolm Thomas, SDSU
December 27	Travis Franklin, CSU
January 3	Jimmer Fredette, BYU
January 10	Jimmer Fredette, BYU, and Malcolm Thomas, SDSU
January 17	Jimmer Fredette, BYU
January 24	Jimmer Fredette, BYU
January 31	Andy Ogide, CSU, and Drew Gordon, New Mexico
February 7	Jimmer Fredette, BYU, and Kawhi Leonard, SDSU
February 14	Jackson Emery, BYU, and D.J. Gay, SDSU
February 21	Malcolm Thomas, SDSU
February 28	Jimmer Fredette, BYU, and Tre'Von Willis, UNLV
March 7	Drew Gordon, UNM

== Post season berths ==
A record tying 6 teams received post season berths. San Diego State was the conference's automatic qualifier to the 2011 NCAA Men's Division I Basketball Tournament and were joined by BYU and UNLV as at-large selections. SDSU was given a second seed in the Western regional while BYU was a third seed. Colorado State and New Mexico went to the National Invitation Tournament. In addition, Air Force received an invitation to compete in the CollegeInsider.com Postseason Tournament.
