= 2010–11 TCU Horned Frogs men's basketball team =

American college basketball season

2010–11 TCU Horned Frogs men's basketball
- Conference: Mountain West Conference
- Record: 11–22 (1–15 Mountain West)
- Head coach: Jim Christian
- Assistant coaches: Bill Wuczynski; Eric Haut; Armon Gates
- Home arena: Daniel–Meyer Coliseum

2010–11 Mountain West Conference men's basketball standings
	Conf.				Overall
Team	W		L	PCT	W		L	PCT
No. 6 San Diego St †	14	–	2	.875	34	–	3	.919
No. 12 BYU	14	–	2	.875	32	–	5	.865
UNLV	11	–	5	.688	24	–	9	.727
Colorado State	9	–	7	.563	19	–	13	.594
New Mexico	8	–	8	.500	22	–	13	.629
Air Force	6	–	10	.375	16	–	16	.500
Utah	6	–	10	.375	13	–	18	.419
Wyoming	3	–	13	.188	10	–	21	.323
TCU	1	–	15	.063	11	–	22	.333
† 2011 MWC tournament winner Rankings from AP/Coaches' Poll

The 2010–11 TCU Horned Frogs basketball team represented Texas Christian University. The team was coached by Jim Christian. They played their home games at Daniel–Meyer Coliseum in Fort Worth, Texas and were a member of the Mountain West Conference. They finished the season 11–22, 1–15 in Mountain West play to finish in last place. They lost in the quarterfinals of the Mountain West Basketball tournament to BYU.

== Preview ==
The Horned Frogs were picked to finish seventh in the Mountain West Conference.

== Roster ==
#	Name	Height	Weight (lbs.)	Position	Class	Hometown	Previous School
1	Jarvis Ray	6'6"	185	G	Fr.	New Orleans, LA	O. Perry Walker HS
2	Zack Price	6'0"	170	G	Fr.	Spring, TX	Klein Oak HS
3	Sammy Yeager	6'5"	190	G	Jr.	Modesto, CA	Weatherford College/Modesto HS
4	Amric Fields	6'9"	210	F	Fr.	Oklahoma City, OK	Putnam West HS
5	Ronnie Moss	6'2"	210	G	Jr.	Fort Worth, TX	Christian Life Acad.
10	Hank Thorns	5'9"	165	G	RS Sr.	Las Vegas, NV	Las Vegas Valley HS/Virginia Tech
12	Nikola Cerina	6'9"	240	F	So.	Topola, SEB	Nikola Tesla Secondary School
13	Andre Clark	6'9"	225	F	Jr.	Little Rock, AR	John A. Logan College/North Little Rock HS
15	Nikola Gacesa	6'9"	240	F	Sr.	Belgrade, SEB	Florida International/Nikola Tesla Secondary School
23	J. R. Cadot	6'5"	195	G	Jr.	Nassau, BAH	C.V. Bethel Senior HS/Sheridan College
24	Thomas Montigel	6'3"	185	G	Fr.	Fort Worth, TX	Paschal HS
25	Greg Hill	6'2"	205	G	Sr.	Gary, IN	Midland College/Merrillville HS
32	Zach Huie	6'4"	200	F	Jr.	Montgomery, TX	Montgomery HS
33	Garlon Green	6'7"	210	F	So.	Missouri City, TX	Hightower HS
34	Cheick Kone	6'10"	240	C	So.	Mali, AFR	Howard College/Cornerstone Christian School

== Schedule and results ==
Date time, TV	Rank^{#}	Opponent^{#}	Result	Record	Site (attendance) city, state
Exhibition
11/02/2010*; 7:00 pm		Rogers State	W 70–53	—	Daniel–Meyer Coliseum; Fort Worth, TX
Regular season
11/12/2010*; 8:00 pm		Jackson State	W 86–62	1–0	Daniel–Meyer Coliseum (3,662); Fort Worth, TX
11/16/2010*; 7:00 pm, The Mtn.		SMU	W 84–64	2–0	Daniel–Meyer Coliseum (3,937); Fort Worth, TX
11/20/2010*; 1:30 pm		vs. Rider; Hall of Fame Tip-Off	L 61–76	2–1	MassMutual Center; Springfield, MA
11/21/2010*; 4:00 pm		vs. Bradley; Hall of Fame Tip-Off	W 74–68	3–1	MassMutual Center (1,066); Springfield, MA
11/22/2010*; 6:00 pm		vs. UMass; Hall of Fame Tip-Off	L 48–67	3–2	MassMutual Center (1,512); Springfield, MA
11/27/2010*; 3:00 pm		Houston	W 79–63	4–2	Daniel–Meyer Coliseum (3,480); Fort Worth, TX
11/29/2010*; 7:00 pm, The Mtn.		USC	W 81–69	5–2	Daniel–Meyer Coliseum (4,076); Fort Worth, TX
12/01/2010*; 7:00 pm		Prairie View A&M	W 78–61	6–2	Daniel–Meyer Coliseum (3,524); Fort Worth, TX
12/04/2010*; 1:00 pm, The Mtn.		Northern Iowa; MWC–MVC Challenge	L 60–64	6–3	Daniel–Meyer Coliseum (4,022); Fort Worth, TX
12/08/2010*; 7:00 pm		at Texas Tech	W 81–77	7–3	United Spirit Arena (9,113); Lubbock, TX
12/11/2010*; 1:00 pm, FSMW		at Nebraska	L 56–70	7–4	Bob Devaney Sports Center (8,057); Lincoln, NE
12/21/2010*; 7:00 pm		Northwestern State	W 96–79	8–4	Daniel–Meyer Coliseum (3,636); Fort Worth, TX
12/28/2010*; 7:00 pm		Chicago State	W 99–72	9–4	Daniel–Meyer Coliseum (3,670); Fort Worth, TX
12/30/2010*; 7:00 pm		at Tulsa	L 66–69	9–5	Reynolds Center (5,143); Tulsa, OK
01/02/2011*; 3:00 pm		at Rice	L 61–70	9–6	Tudor Fieldhouse (1,433); Houston, TX
01/05/2011; 6:30 pm, The Mtn.		No. 6 San Diego State	L 53–66	9–7 (0–1)	Daniel–Meyer Coliseum (4,287); Fort Worth, TX
01/08/2011; 9:00 pm, The Mtn.		at UNLV	L 49–83	9–8 (0–2)	Thomas & Mack Center (12,155); Paradise, NV
01/12/2011; 6:30 pm, The Mtn.		Wyoming	W 78–60	10–8 (1–2)	Daniel–Meyer Coliseum (3,914); Fort Worth, TX
01/15/2011; 8:00 pm, The Mtn.		at Colorado State	L 69–79	10–9 (1–3)	Moby Arena (4,193); Fort Collins, CO
01/18/2011; 9:00 pm, The Mtn.		at No. 9 BYU	L 67–83	10–10 (1–4)	Marriott Center (16,170); Provo, UT
01/22/2011; 5:00 pm, The Mtn.		Utah	L 62–75	10–11 (1–5)	Daniel–Meyer Coliseum (4,190); Fort Worth, TX
01/26/2011; 9:00 pm, The Mtn.		at New Mexico	L 46–71	10–12 (1–6)	The Pit (14,411); Albuquerque, NM
01/29/2011; 5:00 pm, CBSCS		Air Force	L 65–66 ^{OT}	10–13 (1–7)	Daniel–Meyer Coliseum (4,969); Fort Worth, TX
02/05/2011; 9:30 pm, The Mtn.		at No. 7 San Diego State	L 53–66	10–14 (1–8)	Viejas Arena (12,414); San Diego, CA
02/09/2011; 7:00 pm, The Mtn.		UNLV	L 79–94	10–15 (1–9)	Daniel–Meyer Coliseum (3,813); Fort Worth, TX
02/12/2011; 2:30 pm, The Mtn.		at Wyoming	L 67–77	10–16 (1–10)	Arena-Auditorium (4,540); Laramie, WY
02/16/2011; 7:00 pm, The Mtn.		Colorado State	L 55–69	10–17 (1–11)	Daniel–Meyer Coliseum (4,088); Fort Worth, TX
02/19/2011; 3:30 pm, The Mtn.		No. 7 BYU	L 56–79	10–18 (1–12)	Daniel–Meyer Coliseum (7,258); Fort Worth, TX
02/22/2011; 9:00 pm, The Mtn.		at Utah	L 48–50	10–19 (1–13)	Jon M. Huntsman Center (9,203); Salt Lake City, UT
02/26/2011; 7:00 pm, CBSCS		New Mexico	L 70–80	10–20 (1–14)	Daniel–Meyer Coliseum (6,032); Fort Worth, TX
03/02/2011; 7:00 pm, The Mtn.		at Air Force	L 65–70	10–21 (1–15)	Clune Arena (1,707); Colorado Springs, CO
Mountain West tournament
03/09/2011; 4:00 pm, The Mtn.	(9)	vs. (8) Wyoming; MWC First Round	W 70–61	11–21	Thomas & Mack Center; Paradise, NV
03/10/2011; 2:00 pm, The Mtn.	(9)	vs. (1) No. 8 BYU; MWC Quarterfinals	L 58–64	11–22	Thomas & Mack Center (14,697); Paradise, NV
*Non-conference game. ^{#}Rankings from AP Poll. (#) Tournament seedings in parentheses. All times are in Central Time.
