= 2010–11 San Diego State Aztecs men's basketball team =

American college basketball season

2010–11 San Diego State Aztecs men's basketball
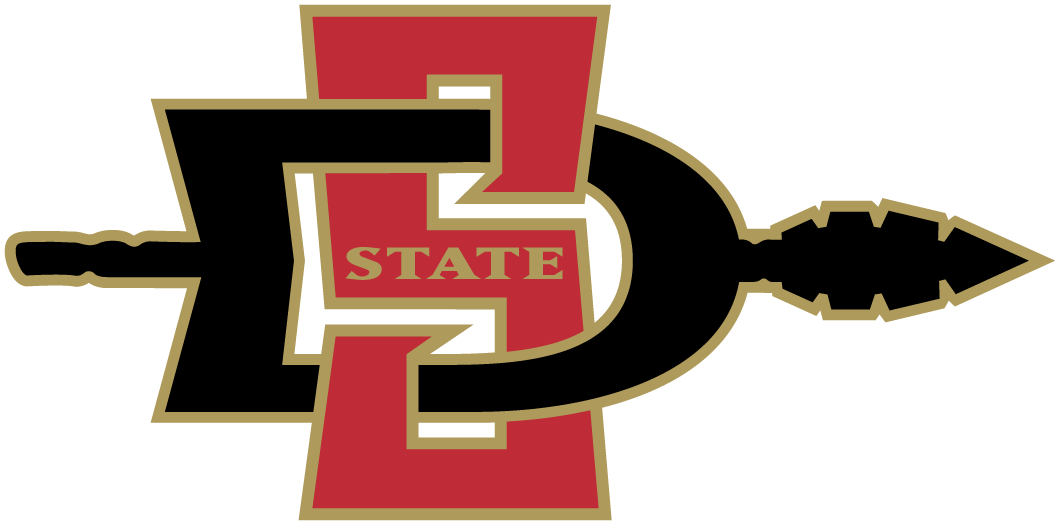

Mountain West regular season co-champions Mountain West tournament champions

NCAA Tournament, Sweet Sixteen
- Conference: Mountain West Conference

Ranking
- Coaches: No. 11
- AP: No. 6
- Record: 34–3 (14–2 Mountain West)
- Head coach: Steve Fisher
- Associate head coach: Brian Dutcher
- Assistant coaches: Justin Hutson (5th season); Mark Fisher
- Home arena: Viejas Arena

2010–11 Mountain West Conference men's basketball standings
	Conf.				Overall
Team	W		L	PCT	W		L	PCT
No. 6 San Diego St †	14	–	2	.875	34	–	3	.919
No. 12 BYU	14	–	2	.875	32	–	5	.865
UNLV	11	–	5	.688	24	–	9	.727
Colorado State	9	–	7	.563	19	–	13	.594
New Mexico	8	–	8	.500	22	–	13	.629
Air Force	6	–	10	.375	16	–	16	.500
Utah	6	–	10	.375	13	–	18	.419
Wyoming	3	–	13	.188	10	–	21	.323
TCU	1	–	15	.063	11	–	22	.333
† 2011 MWC tournament winner Rankings from AP/Coaches' Poll

The 2010–11 San Diego State men's basketball team represented San Diego State University in the 2010–11 college basketball season. It was their 12th season in the Mountain West Conference. This was head coach Steve Fisher's twelfth season at San Diego State. The Aztecs competed in the Mountain West Conference and played their home games at Viejas Arena.

The 2010-11 season was arguably the best season in San Diego State's 90-year basketball history. The Aztecs finished the regular season as Mountain West co-champions with BYU, and won the 2011 Mountain West Conference men's basketball tournament to gain the conference's automatic bid to the 2011 NCAA Division I men's basketball tournament. After defeating Northern Colorado in the second round for their first ever NCAA Tournament win, the defeated Temple in the third round to advance to the Sweet Sixteen where they were defeated by eventual tournament champion Connecticut to finish the season 34–3.

== Off-season ==
=== Departures ===
Name	Number	Pos.	Height	Weight	Year	Hometown	Notes
Kelvin Davis	40	G	6'3"	220	Senior	Waterbury, Connecticut	Graduated
Jason Deutchman	20	G	6'6"	220	Senior	Los Angeles, California	Graduated
Ben Kneller	15	F	6'6"	200	Senior	Westlake Village, California	Graduated
Bryan Horton	21	G	6'1"	205	Sophomore	Anaheim, California	Elected to transfer.
Tyrone Shelley	3	G	6'6"	225	Sophomore	San Diego, California	Elected to transfer.

=== Incoming transfers ===
Name	Number	Pos.	Height	Weight	Year	Hometown	Notes
Xavier Thames	2	G	6'3"	185	Sophomore	Sacramento, California	Elected to transfer from Washington State. Thames will redshirt for the 2010-11 season, under NCAA transfer rules. Will have three years of eligibility.

=== 2009 recruiting class ===
College recruiting information
Name	Hometown	School	Height	Weight	Commit date
LaBradford Franklin; PG	Temecula, CA	Great Oak High School	6 ft 2 in (1.88 m)	170 lb (77 kg)	Jan 25, 2010
LaBradford Franklin; PG	Recruit ratings: Scout: Rivals: (90)				
Jamaal Franklin; SG	Phoenix, AZ	Westwind Prep Academy	6 ft 5 in (1.96 m)	190 lb (86 kg)	Nov 24, 2009
Jamaal Franklin; SG	Recruit ratings: Scout: Rivals: (Post)				
Overall recruit ranking:
Note: In many cases, Scout, Rivals, 247Sports, On3, and ESPN may conflict in their listings of height and weight.; In these cases, the average was taken. ESPN grades are on a 100-point scale.; Sources: "2010 Team Ranking". Rivals.

== Roster ==
2010–11 San Diego State Aztecs men's basketball team
Players
Coaches

Pos.	#	Name	Height	Weight	Year	Previous school	Hometown
F	0	Alec Williams	6 ft 6 in (1.98 m)	245 lb (111 kg)	So	JSerra HS	San Juan Capistrano, California
G	2	Xavier Thames	6 ft 3 in (1.91 m)	185 lb (84 kg)	So	Washington State	Sacramento, California
G	3	LaBradford Franklin	6 ft 2 in (1.88 m)	170 lb (77 kg)	Fr	Great Oak HS	Temecula, California
F	4	Malcolm Thomas	6 ft 9 in (2.06 m)	220 lb (100 kg)	Sr	San Diego City College	San Diego, California
C	5	Brian Carlwell	6 ft 11 in (2.11 m)	300 lb (136 kg)	Sr	Illinois	Maywood, Illinois
F	10	Tim Shelton	6 ft 7 in (2.01 m)	245 lb (111 kg)	Jr	Clovis West HS	Fresno, California
G	11	James Rahon	6 ft 5 in (1.96 m)	205 lb (93 kg)	So	Santa Clara	San Diego, California
F	15	Kawhi Leonard	6 ft 7 in (2.01 m)	225 lb (102 kg)	So	King HS	Riverside, California
G	21	Jamaal Franklin	6 ft 5 in (1.96 m)	185 lb (84 kg)	Fr	Westwind Prep	Sacramento, California
G	22	Chase Tapley	6 ft 2 in (1.88 m)	200 lb (91 kg)	So	Sacramento HS	Sacramento, California
G	23	D. J. Gay	6 ft 0 in (1.83 m)	170 lb (77 kg)	Sr	John H. Francis Polytechnic HS	Sun Valley, California
F	32	Billy White	6 ft 8 in (2.03 m)	235 lb (107 kg)	Sr	Green Valley HS	Las Vegas, Nevada
F	42	Mehdi Cheriet	6 ft 9 in (2.06 m)	225 lb (102 kg)	Sr	Arizona Western	Tarare, France

Head coach

- Steve Fisher (Illinois State)

Assistant coach(es)

- Brian Dutcher (Minnesota)
- Justin Hutson (Cal State Bakersfield)
- Mark Fisher (Michigan)

Legend

- (C) Team captain
- (S) Suspended
- (I) Ineligible
- (W) Walk-on
- Injured
- Current redshirt

Roster

== Schedule and results ==
- All times are Pacific

Date time, TV	Rank^{#}	Opponent^{#}	Result	Record	Site (attendance) city, state
Exhibition
11/08/2010*; 7:00 pm	No. 25	Point Loma Nazarene	W 92–54	—	Viejas Arena (5,240); San Diego, CA
Regular season
11/13/2010*; 4:00 pm	No. 25	at Long Beach State	W 81–65	1–0	Walter Pyramid (5,143); Long Beach, CA
11/16/2010*; 8:15 pm, ESPN2	No. 25	at No. 11 Gonzaga; CBE Classic	W 79–76	2–0	McCarthey Athletic Center (6,000); Spokane, WA
11/20/2010*; 2:30 pm	No. 25	vs. Green Bay; CBE Classic	W 79–70	3–0	John D. Millett Hall; Oxford, OH
11/21/2010*; 2:30 pm	No. 25	vs. IUPUI; CBE Classic	W 61–46	4–0	John D. Millett Hall; Oxford, OH
11/22/2010*; 4:00 pm	No. 18	at Miami (OH); CBE Classic	W 77–56	5–0	John D. Millett Hall (1,858); Oxford, OH
11/26/2010*; 7:00 pm	No. 18	San Diego Christian	W 88–69	6–0	Viejas Arena (5,674); San Diego, CA
12/01/2010*; 7:05 pm, The Mtn.	No. 17	Saint Mary's	W 69–55	7–0	Viejas Arena (12,414); San Diego, CA
12/04/2010*; 7:05 pm, The Mtn.	No. 17	Wichita State; MWC–MVC Challenge	W 83–69	8–0	Viejas Arena (12,414); San Diego, CA
12/08/2010*; 7:30 pm, 4SD	No. 14	at California	W 77–57	9–0	Haas Pavilion (9,426); Berkeley, CA
12/11/2010*; 7:00 pm, 4SD	No. 14	San Diego; City Championship	W 77–49	10–0	Viejas Arena (12,414); San Diego, CA
12/13/2010*; 7:00 pm	No. 11	Cal Poly	W 51–45	11–0	Viejas Arena (7,971); San Diego, CA
12/18/2010*; 7:00 pm	No. 11	UC Santa Barbara	W 90–64	12–0	Viejas Arena (12,414); San Diego, CA
12/21/2010*; 7:00 pm	No. 7	vs. San Francisco; Las Vegas Holiday Hoops Classic	W 62–56	13–0	SouthPoint Arena (1,202); Enterprise, NV
12/22/2010*; 7:00 pm	No. 7	vs. IUPUI; Las Vegas Holiday Hoops Classic	W 56–54	14–0	SouthPoint Arena (1,095); Enterprise, NV
12/31/2010*; 1:00 pm	No. 7	Occidental	W 93–50	15–0	Viejas Arena (12,414); San Diego, CA
01/05/2011; 4:30 pm, The Mtn.	No. 6	at TCU	W 66–53	16–0 (1–0)	Daniel-Meyer Coliseum (4,287); Fort Worth, TX
01/08/2011; 1:00 pm, Versus	No. 6	at Utah	W 71–62	17–0 (2–0)	Jon M. Huntsman Center (8,571); Salt Lake City, UT
01/12/2011; 7:00 pm, CBSCS	No. 6	UNLV	W 55–49	18–0 (3–0)	Viejas Arena (12,414); San Diego, CA
01/15/2011; 4:00 pm, CBSCS	No. 6	at New Mexico	W 87–77	19–0 (4–0)	The Pit (15,411); Albuquerque, NM
01/19/2011; 7:00 pm, 4SD	No. 6	Air Force	W 68–55	20–0 (5–0)	Viejas Arena (12,414); San Diego, CA
01/26/2011; 7:00 pm, CBSCS	No. 4	at No. 9 BYU	L 58–71	20–1 (5–1)	Marriott Center (22,700); Provo, UT
01/29/2011; 7:00 pm, The Mtn.	No. 4	Wyoming	W 96–57	21–1 (6–1)	Viejas Arena (12,414); San Diego, CA
02/02/2011; 6:00 pm, CBSCS	No. 7	at Colorado State	W 56–54	22–1 (7–1)	Moby Arena (7,353); Fort Collins, CO
02/05/2011; 7:30 pm, The Mtn.	No. 7	TCU	W 60–53	23–1 (8–1)	Viejas Arena (12,414); San Diego, CA
02/08/2011; 7:30 pm, The Mtn.	No. 6	Utah	W 85–53	24–1 (9–1)	Viejas Arena (12,414); San Diego, CA
02/12/2011; 5:00 pm, CBSCS	No. 6	at UNLV	W 63–57	25–1 (10–1)	Thomas & Mack Center (18,557); Paradise, NV
02/16/2011; 7:30 pm, The Mtn.	No. 6	New Mexico	W 68–62	26–1 (11–1)	Viejas Arena (12,414); San Diego, CA
02/19/2011; 11:30 am, The Mtn.	No. 6	at Air Force	W 70–58	27–1 (12–1)	Clune Arena (3,463); Colorado Springs, CO
02/26/2011; 11:00 am, CBS	No. 4	No. 7 BYU	L 67–80	27–2 (12–2)	Viejas Arena (12,414); San Diego, CA
03/01/2011; 7:00 pm, The Mtn.	No. 9	at Wyoming	W 85–58	28–2 (13–2)	Arena-Auditorium (4,518); Laramie, WY
03/05/2011; 7:00 pm, The Mtn.	No. 9	Colorado State	W 66–48	29–2 (14–2)	Viejas Arena (12,414); San Diego, CA
Mountain West tournament
03/10/2011; 6:00 pm, The Mtn.	(2) No. 7	vs. (7) Utah; MWC Quarterfinals	W 64–50	30–2	Thomas & Mack Center; Paradise, NV
03/11/2011; 8:30 pm, CBSCS	(2) No. 7	at (3) UNLV; MWC Semifinals	W 74–72	31–2	Thomas & Mack Center (18,500); Paradise, NV
03/12/2011; 6:00 pm, Versus	(2) No. 7	vs. (1) No. 8 BYU; MWC Championship Game	W 72–54	32–2	Thomas & Mack Center (18,776); Paradise, NV
NCAA tournament
03/17/2011*; 1:40 pm, TNT	(2 W) No. 6	vs. (15 W) Northern Colorado; NCAA Second Round	W 68–50	33–2	McKale Center (10,101); Tucson, AZ
03/19/2011*; 3:10 pm, TNT	(2 W) No. 6	vs. (7 W) Temple; NCAA Third Round	W 71–64 ^{2OT}	34–2	McKale Center (11,127); Tucson, AZ
03/24/2011*; 4:15 pm, CBS	(2 W) No. 6	vs. (3 W) No. 9 Connecticut; NCAA Sweet Sixteen	L 67–74	34–3	Honda Center (17,890); Anaheim, CA
*Non-conference game. ^{#}Rankings from AP Poll. (#) Tournament seedings in parentheses. W=NCAA West Regional. All times are in Pacific Time Zone.

== Rankings ==
Ranking movements Legend: ██ Increase in ranking ██ Decrease in ranking RV = Received votes ( ) = First-place votes
	Week																			
Poll	Pre	1	2	3	4	5	6	7	8	9	10	11	12	13	14	15	16	17	18	Final
AP	25	25	18	17	14	11	7	7	6	6	6	4	7	6	6	6	9	7	6	Not released
Coaches	RV	RV	22	19	15	10	7	7	6	6	6	4	6	6	6	4 (3)	9	6	5	11

*AP does not release post-NCAA Tournament rankings.

== Players drafted into the NBA ==
Year	Round	Pick	Player	NBA Club
2011	1	15	Kawhi Leonard	Indiana Pacers (traded to San Antonio)

== See also ==
- 2010–11 MWC men's basketball season
- San Diego sports curse
