= 2010–11 NCAA Division I men's basketball rankings =

- Season: 2010–11
- NCAA Tournament: 2011
- Preseason No. 1: Duke
- NCAA Tournament Champions: Connecticut
NCAA Division I men's basketball rankings
| |

Two human polls make up the 2010–11 NCAA Division I men's basketball rankings, the AP Poll and the Coaches Poll, in addition to various publications' preseason polls.

== Legend ==
| | Increase in ranking |
| | Decrease in ranking |
| | Not ranked previous week |
| Italics | Number of first place votes |
| (#-#) | Win–loss record |
| т | Tied with team above or below also with this symbol |

== AP poll ==
The Associated Press (AP) preseason poll was released on October 28, 2010. This poll is compiled by sportswriters across the nation. In Division I men's and women's college basketball, the AP Poll is largely just a tool to compare schools throughout the season and spark debate, as it has no bearing on postseason play. Generally, all top 25 teams in the poll are invited to the NCAA basketball tournament, also known as March Madness.

| | Preseason Oct 28 | Week 1 Nov 15 | Week 2 Nov 22 | Week 3 Nov 29 | Week 4 Dec 6 | Week 5 Dec 13 | Week 6 Dec 20 | Week 7 Dec 27 | Week 8 Jan 3 | Week 9 Jan 10 | Week 10 Jan 17 | Week 11 Jan 24 | Week 12 Jan 31 | Week 13 Feb 7 | Week 14 Feb 14 | Week 15 Feb 21 | Week 16 Feb 28 | Week 17 Mar 7 | Week 18 Mar 14 | |
|---|---|---|---|---|---|---|---|---|---|---|---|---|---|---|---|---|---|---|---|---|
| 1. | Duke 55 | Duke (1–0) 58 | Duke (3–0) 58 | Duke (6–0) 65 | Duke (8–0) 65 | Duke (10–0) 65 | Duke (10–0) 64 | Duke (11–0) 65 | Duke (13–0) 65 | Duke (15–0) 65 | Ohio State (18–0) 49 | Ohio State (20–0) 63 | Ohio State (22–0) 65 | Ohio State (24–0) 65 | Kansas (24–1) 22 | Duke (25–2) 35 | Ohio State (27–2) 45 | Ohio State (29–2) 52 | Ohio State (32–2) 51 | 1. |
| 2. | Michigan State 8 | Michigan State (1–0) 7 | Michigan State (2–0) 6 | Ohio State (5–0) | Ohio State (6–0) | Ohio State (8–0) | Ohio State (10–0) 1 | Ohio State (12–0) | Ohio State (14–0) | Ohio State (16–0) | Kansas (17–0) 6 | Pittsburgh (19–1) 1 | Kansas (20–1) | Kansas (22–1) | Ohio State (24–1) 14 | Ohio State (25–2) 10 | Kansas (27–2) 14 | Kansas (29–2) 13 | Kansas (32–2) 14 | 2. |
| 3. | Kansas State 2 | Kansas State (1–0) | Ohio State (3–0) | Pittsburgh (7–0) | Pittsburgh (9–0) | Kansas (9–0) | Kansas (10–0) | Kansas (11–0) | Kansas (13–0) | Kansas (15–0) | Syracuse (18–0) 8 | Duke (18–1) 1 | Texas (18–3) | Texas (20–3) | Texas (22–3) 23 | Kansas (25–2) 5 | BYU (27–2) 5 | Pittsburgh (27–4) | Duke (30–4) | 3. |
| 4. | Ohio State | Ohio State (1–0) | Kansas State (3–0) 1 | Kansas (6–0) | Kansas (7–0) | Connecticut (8–0) | Connecticut (8–0) | Connecticut (10–0) | Syracuse (15–0) | Syracuse (16–0) | Duke (16–1) 1 | San Diego State (20–0) | Pittsburgh (20–2) | Pittsburgh (21–2) | Pittsburgh (23–2) 6 | Pittsburgh (24–3) 12 | Duke (26–3) 1 т | Notre Dame (25–5) | Pittsburgh (27–5) | 4. |
| 5. | Pittsburgh | Pittsburgh (3–0) | Pittsburgh (5–0) | Kansas State (6–1) | Kansas State (7–1) | Syracuse (10–0) | Syracuse (11–0) | Syracuse (13–0) | Pittsburgh (13–1) | Pittsburgh (15–1) | Pittsburgh (17–1) 1 | Connecticut (16–2) | Duke (19–2) | Duke (21–2) | Duke (23–2) | Texas (23–4) 1 | Pittsburgh (25–4) т | Duke (27–4) | Notre Dame (26–6) | 5. |
| 6. | Villanova | Villanova (1–0) | Kansas (3–0) | Michigan State (5–1) | Connecticut (7–0) | Kansas State (9–1) | Pittsburgh (11–1) | Pittsburgh (12–1) | San Diego State (15–0) | San Diego State (17–0) | San Diego State (19–0) | Kansas (18–1) | Connecticut (17–3) | San Diego State (23–1) | San Diego State (25–1) | San Diego State (27–1) | Purdue (24–5) | North Carolina (24–6) | San Diego State (32–2) | 6. |
| 7. | Kansas | Kansas (1–0) | Villanova (4–0) | Connecticut (5–0) | Michigan State (6–2) | Tennessee (7–0) | San Diego State (12–0) | San Diego State (14–0) | Villanova (12–1) | Villanova (14–1) | Villanova (16–1) | Texas (16–3) | San Diego State (21–1) | BYU (22–2) | BYU (24–2) | BYU (25–2) 2 | Texas (24–5) | San Diego State (29–2) | North Carolina (26–7) | 7. |
| 8. | North Carolina | North Carolina (1–0) | Kentucky (2–0) | Syracuse (6–0) | Syracuse (8–0) | Pittsburgh (10–1) | Villanova (9–1) | Villanova (10–1) | Connecticut (11–1) | Purdue (15–1) | Connecticut (14–2) | Villanova (17–2) | BYU (20–2) | Notre Dame (19–4) | Notre Dame (21–4) | Purdue (22–5) | Notre Dame (23–5) | BYU (28–3) | Texas (27–7) | 8. |
| 9. | Florida | Florida (1–0) | Syracuse (4–0) | Missouri (5–0) | Georgetown (8–0) | Baylor (6–0) | Missouri (10–1) | Georgetown (11–1) | Missouri (13–1) | Notre Dame (14–2) | BYU (17–1) | Syracuse (18–2) т | Notre Dame (17–4) | Villanova (19–4) | Georgetown (20–5) | Notre Dame (21–5) | San Diego State (27–2) | Purdue (25–6) | Connecticut (26–9) | 9. |
| 10. | Syracuse | Syracuse (2–0) | Purdue (3–0) | Kentucky (4–1) | Baylor (6–0) | Villanova (8–1) | Georgetown (10–1) | Missouri (11–1) | Kentucky (11–2) | Connecticut (12–2) | Texas (14–3) | BYU (19–1) т | Kentucky (16–4) | Connecticut (18–4) | Wisconsin (19–5) | Arizona (23–4) | Wisconsin (22–6) | Texas (25–6) | BYU (30–4) | 10. |
| 11. | Kentucky | Gonzaga (2–0) | Missouri (2–0) | Baylor (5–0) | Tennessee (6–0) | San Diego State (10–0) | Kansas State (9–2) | Kentucky (9–2) | Purdue (13–1) | BYU (16–1) | Texas A&M (16–1) | Missouri (17–3) | Purdue (18–4) | Georgetown (18–5) | Purdue (20–5) | Georgetown (21–6) | Louisville (22–7) | Syracuse (25–6) | Kentucky (25–8) | 11. |
| 12. | Gonzaga | Kentucky (1–0) | Baylor (3–0) | Villanova (5–1) | Villanova (6–1) | Illinois (10–1) | Michigan State (8–3) | Purdue (11–1) | Texas (11–2) | Texas (12–3) | Kentucky (14–3) | Purdue (17–3) | Villanova (17–4) | Syracuse (20–4) | Arizona (21–4) | Wisconsin (20–6) | Syracuse (24–6) | Florida (24–6) | Syracuse (26–7) | 12. |
| 13. | Illinois | Illinois (3–0) | Washington (2–0) | Tennessee (5–0) | Memphis (7–0) | Missouri (8–1) | Kentucky (8–2) | Texas (10–2) | Georgetown (12–2) | Kentucky (12–3) | Missouri (15–3) | Texas A&M (17–2) | Georgetown (16–5) | Wisconsin (17–5) | Connecticut (19–5) | Florida (21–5) | North Carolina (22–6) | Wisconsin (23–7) | Purdue (25–7) | 13. |
| 14. | Purdue | Purdue (1–0) | Memphis (4–0) | Memphis (5–0) | San Diego State (8–0) | Michigan State (7–3) | Purdue (10–1) | Minnesota (11–1) | Notre Dame (12–2) | Texas A&M (14–1) | Purdue (15–3) | Kentucky (15–4) | Missouri (17–4) | Purdue (18–5) | Florida (20–5) | Connecticut (20–6) | Florida (22–6) | Louisville (23–8) | Louisville (25–9) | 14. |
| 15. | Missouri | Missouri (0–0) | Minnesota (5–0) | Minnesota (6–1) | Missouri (6–1) | Georgetown (9–1) | Baylor (7–1) | Notre Dame (11–1) | BYU (14–1) | Missouri (14–2) | Minnesota (14–4) | Notre Dame (16–4) | Louisville (17–4) | Arizona (20–4) | Villanova (19–6) | Villanova (21–6) | St. John's (19–9) | Kentucky (22–8) | Florida (26–7) | 15. |
| 16. | Baylor | Butler (1–0) | Florida (3–1) т | Georgetown (6–0) | Illinois (8–1) | BYU (10–0) | Memphis (8–1) | BYU (12–1) | Texas A&M (12–1) | Illinois (13–3) | Notre Dame (14–4) | Minnesota (15–4) | Texas A&M (17–3) | Louisville (18–5) | Louisville (19–6) | Louisville (20–7) | Connecticut (21–7) | Arizona (25–6) | Wisconsin (23–8) | 16. |
| 17. | Butler | Washington (1–0) т | Georgetown (5–0) т | San Diego State (6–0) | Kentucky (5–2) | Kentucky (7–2) | Minnesota (10–1) | Kansas State (10–3) | Kansas State (11–3) | Washington (12–3) | Michigan State (12–5) | Wisconsin (15–4) | Syracuse (18–4) | Florida (18–5) | Syracuse (20–6) | Syracuse (22–6) | Georgetown (21–8) | St. John's (20–10) | Arizona (27–7) | 17. |
| 18. | Washington | Baylor (1–0) т | San Diego State (4–0) | Florida (5–1) | BYU (8–0) | Memphis (7–1) | Texas (9–2) | Texas A&M (11–1) | Michigan State (9–4) | Louisville (13–2) | Wisconsin (13–4) | Washington (15–4) | Minnesota (16–5) | Kentucky (16–6) | Vanderbilt (18–6) | Vanderbilt (20–6) | Arizona (23–6) | Xavier (24–6) | St. John's (21–11) | 18. |
| 19. | Memphis | Memphis (1–0) | Illinois (4–1) | Texas (5–1) | Purdue (7–1) | Purdue (9–1) | Tennessee (7–2) | Central Florida (11–0) | Central Florida (13–0) | Temple (11–3) | Louisville (14–3) | Vanderbilt (14–4) | Wisconsin (15–5) | Missouri (18–5) | North Carolina (18–6) | North Carolina (20–6) | Villanova (21–8) | Kansas State (22–9) | Utah State (30–3) | 19. |
| 20. | Georgetown | Georgetown (1–0) | Texas (3–1) | Illinois (6–1) | UNLV (8–0) | Louisville (8–0) | Florida (8–2) | Michigan State (8–4) | Illinois (12–3) | Wisconsin (12–3) | Washington (13–4) | Illinois (14–6) | Washington (15–5) | North Carolina (17–5) | Missouri (19–6) | Missouri (21–6) | Kentucky (20–8) | West Virginia (20–10) | Xavier (24–7) | 20. |
| 21. | Virginia Tech | Temple (2–0) | Temple (2–0) | BYU (6–0) | Washington (5–2) | Minnesota (9–1) | Illinois (10–2) | Memphis (9–2) | Memphis (11–2) | Kansas State (12–4) | West Virginia (12–4) | Georgetown (14–5) | Arizona (18–4) | Utah State (22–2) | Texas A&M (19–5) | Texas A&M (21–5) | Vanderbilt (21–7) | Connecticut (21–9) | Kansas State (22–10) | 21. |
| 22. | Temple | Virginia Tech (1–0) | Gonzaga (2–1) | Purdue (5–1) | Minnesota (7–1) | Texas (7–2) т | Notre Dame (10–1) | Louisville (10–1) | Vanderbilt (11–2) | Georgetown (12–4) | Saint Mary's (16–2) | Florida State (15–5) | Utah State (20–2) | Texas A&M (17–5) | Kentucky (17–7) | Kentucky (19–7) | Missouri (22–7) | Georgetown (21–9) | West Virginia (20–11) | 22. |
| 23. | Tennessee | BYU (1–0) | BYU (3–0) | Washington (3–2) | Notre Dame (8–0) | UNLV (9–1) т | BYU (10–1) | Illinois (10–3) | Washington (10–3) | Central Florida (14–1) | Illinois (13–5) т | Louisville (15–4) | Vanderbilt (15–5) т | Vanderbilt (16–6) | Temple (19–5) | St. John's (17–9) | Xavier (22–6) | Utah State (28–3) | Washington (23–10) | 23. |
| 24. | BYU | Tennessee (1–0) | Tennessee (3–0) | UNLV (6–0) | Louisville (6–0) | Notre Dame (9–1) | Central Florida (10–0) | Vanderbilt (9–2) | Cincinnati (14–0) | Georgia (12–2) | Georgetown (13–5) т | Florida (15–4) | North Carolina (15–5) т | Temple (17–5) | Xavier (18–6) | Temple (21–5) | Texas A&M (22–6) | Temple (24–6) | Texas A&M (24–8) | 24. |
| 25. | San Diego State | San Diego State (1–0) | North Carolina (2–2) | Notre Dame (7–0) | Texas (6–2) | Texas A&M (9–1) | Texas A&M (10–1) | Temple (9–2) | UNLV (12–2) | Cincinnati (14–1) | Cincinnati (16–2) | Michigan State (12–7) | West Virginia (14–6) | West Virginia (15–7) | Utah State (23–3) | Xavier (20–6) | Utah State (26–3) | Cincinnati (24–7) | Vanderbilt (23–10) | 25. |
| | Preseason Oct 28 | Week 1 Nov 15 | Week 2 Nov 22 | Week 3 Nov 29 | Week 4 Dec 6 | Week 5 Dec 13 | Week 6 Dec 20 | Week 7 Dec 27 | Week 8 Jan 3 | Week 9 Jan 10 | Week 10 Jan 17 | Week 11 Jan 24 | Week 12 Jan 31 | Week 13 Feb 7 | Week 14 Feb 14 | Week 15 Feb 21 | Week 16 Feb 28 | Week 17 Mar 7 | Week 18 Mar 14 | |
| | | None | Dropped: Butler (2–1); Virginia Tech (2–1) | Dropped: Temple (3–2); Gonzaga (3–2); North Carolina (4–2) | Dropped: Florida (6–2) | Dropped: Washington (6–3) | Dropped: Louisville (9–1); UNLV (10–2) | Dropped: Baylor (8–3); Tennessee (8–3); Florida (9–3) | Dropped: Minnesota (11–3); Louisville (11–2); Temple (9–3) | Dropped: Michigan State (10–5); Memphis (12–3); Vanderbilt (11–3); UNLV (13–3) | Dropped: Temple (12–4); Kansas State (13–5); Central Florida (14–2); Georgia (13–3) | Dropped: West Virginia (13–5); Saint Mary's (17–3); Cincinnati (17–3) | Dropped: Illinois (14–7); Florida State (15–6); Florida (16–5); Michigan State (13–8) | Dropped: Minnesota (16–7); Washington (15–7) | Dropped: West Virginia (16–8) | Dropped: Utah State (25–3) | Dropped: Temple (22–6) | Dropped: Villanova (21–10); Vanderbilt (21–9); Missouri (22–9); Texas A&M (23–7) | Dropped: Georgetown (21–10); Temple (25–7); Cincinnati (25–8) | |

== ESPN/USA Today Coaches Poll ==
The Coaches Poll is the second oldest poll still in use after the AP Poll. It is compiled by a rotating group of 31 college Division I head coaches. The Poll operates by Borda count. Each voting member ranks teams from 1 to 25. Each team then receives points for their ranking in reverse order: Number 1 earns 25 points, number 2 earns 24 points, and so forth. The points are then combined and the team with the highest points is then ranked #1; second highest is ranked #2 and so forth. Only the top 25 teams with points are ranked, with teams receiving first place votes noted the quantity next to their name. Any team receiving votes after the top 25 are listed after the top 25 by their point totals. However, these are not real rankings: They are not considered #26, #27, etc. The maximum points a single team can earn is 775. The preseason poll was released on October 21, 2010.

| | Preseason Oct 21 | Week 1 Nov 15 | Week 2 Nov 22 | Week 3 Nov 29 | Week 4 Dec 6 | Week 5 Dec 13 | Week 6 Dec 20 | Week 7 Dec 27 | Week 8 Jan 3 | Week 9 Jan 10 | Week 10 Jan 17 | Week 11 Jan 24 | Week 12 Jan 31 | Week 13 Feb 7 | Week 14 Feb 14 | Week 15 Feb 21 | Week 16 Feb 28 | Week 17 Mar 7 | Week 18 Mar 13 | Week 19 Final | |
|---|---|---|---|---|---|---|---|---|---|---|---|---|---|---|---|---|---|---|---|---|---|
| 1. | Duke 29 | Duke (1–0) 29 | Duke (3–0) 29 | Duke (6–0) 31 | Duke (8–0) 31 | Duke (10–0) 31 | Duke (10–0) 31 | Duke (11–0) 31 | Duke (13–0) 31 | Duke (15–0) 31 | Ohio State (18–0) 28 | Ohio State (20–0) 31 | Ohio State (22–0) 31 | Ohio State (24–0) 31 | Kansas (24–1) 14 | Duke (25–2) 19 | Ohio State (27–2) 17 | Ohio State (29–2) 25 | Ohio State (32–2) 26 | Connecticut (30–9) 30 | 1. |
| 2. | Michigan State 2 | Michigan State (1–0) 2 | Michigan State (2–0) 2 | Ohio State (5–0) | Ohio State (6–0) | Ohio State (8–0) | Ohio State (10–0) | Ohio State (12–0) | Ohio State (14–0) | Ohio State (16–0) | Kansas (17–0) 2 | Pittsburgh (19–1) | Kansas (20–1) | Kansas (22–1) | Texas (22–3) 13 | Kansas (25–2) 1 | Kansas (27–2) 14 | Kansas (29–2) 6 | Kansas (32–2) 5 | Butler (27–9) | 2. |
| 3. | Kansas State | Kansas State (1–0) | Ohio State (3–0) | Pittsburgh (7–0) | Pittsburgh (9–0) | Kansas (9–0) | Kansas (10–0) | Kansas (11–0) | Kansas (13–0) | Kansas (15–0) | Syracuse (18–1) 1 | Duke (18–1) | Texas (18–3) | Texas (20–3) | Ohio State (24–1) 3 | Ohio State (25–2) 4 | BYU (27–2) | Pittsburgh (27–4) | Duke (30–4) | Kentucky (29–8) | 3. |
| 4. | Pittsburgh | Pittsburgh (3–0) | Kansas State (3–0) | Kansas (6–0) | Kansas (7–0) | Connecticut (8–0) | Connecticut (8–0) | Connecticut (10–0) | Syracuse (15–0) | Syracuse (16–0) | Pittsburgh (17–1) | San Diego State (20–0) | Pittsburgh (20–2) | Pittsburgh (21–2) | Pittsburgh (23–2) 1 | San Diego State (27–1) 3 | Duke (26–3) | Notre Dame (25–5) | Pittsburgh (27–5) | Kansas (35–3) | 4. |
| 5. | Ohio State | Ohio State (1–0) | Pittsburgh (5–0) | Kansas State (6–1) | Kansas State (7–1) | Syracuse (10–0) | Syracuse (11–0) | Syracuse (13–0) | Pittsburgh (13–1) | Pittsburgh (15–1) | Duke (16–1) | Connecticut (16–2) | Duke (19–2) | Duke (21–2) | Duke (23–2) | Texas (23–4) | Pittsburgh (25–4) | Duke (27–4) | San Diego State (32–2) | Ohio State (34–3) 1 | 5. |
| 6. | Villanova | Kansas (1–0) | Kansas (3–0) | Michigan State (5–1) | Connecticut (7–0) | Kansas State (9–1) | Pittsburgh (11–1) | Pittsburgh (12–1) | San Diego State (15–0) | San Diego State (17–0) | San Diego State (19–0) | Kansas (18–1) | San Diego State (21–1) | San Diego State (23–1) | San Diego State (25–1) | Pittsburgh (24–3) 4 | Purdue (24–5) | San Diego State (29–2) | Notre Dame (26–6) | VCU (28–11) | 6. |
| 7. | Kansas | Villanova (1–0) | Villanova (4–0) | Syracuse (6–0) | Syracuse (8–0) | Tennessee (7–0) | San Diego State (12–0) | San Diego State (14–0) | Villanova (12–1) | Villanova (14–1) | Villanova (16–1) | Villanova (17–2) | Connecticut (17–3) | Notre Dame (19–4) | Notre Dame (21–4) | BYU (25–2) | Notre Dame (23–5) | North Carolina (24–6) | North Carolina (26–7) | Duke (32–5) | 7. |
| 8. | Purdue | North Carolina (1–0) | Purdue (3–0) | Missouri (5–0) | Michigan State (6–2) | Pittsburgh (10–1) | Villanova (9–1) | Villanova (10–1) | Missouri (13–1) | Purdue (15–1) | Connecticut (14–2) | Texas (16–3) | Notre Dame (17–4) | BYU (22–2) | BYU (24–2) | Purdue (22–5) | Texas (24–5) | BYU (28–3) | Connecticut (26–9) | North Carolina (29–8) | 8. |
| 9. | North Carolina | Purdue (1–0) | Kentucky (2–0) | Connecticut (5–0) | Baylor (6–0) | Baylor (6–0) | Georgetown (10–1) | Georgetown (11–1) | Connecticut (11–1) | Connecticut (12–2) | BYU (17–1) | BYU (19–1) | BYU (20–2) | Connecticut (18–4) | Georgetown (20–5) | Notre Dame (21–5) | San Diego State (27–2) | Purdue (25–6) | Texas (27–7) | Arizona (30–8) | 9. |
| 10. | Kentucky | Florida (1–0) | Syracuse (4–0) | Baylor (5–0) | Georgetown (8–0) | San Diego State (10–0) | Missouri (10–1) | Missouri (11–1) | Purdue (13–1) | BYU (16–1) | Texas A&M (16–1) | Syracuse (18–2) | Purdue (18–4) | Villanova (19–4) | Wisconsin (19–5) | Arizona (23–4) | Wisconsin (22–6) | Texas (25–6) | Kentucky (25–8) | Florida (29–8) | 10. |
| 11. | Florida | Syracuse (2–0) | Washington (2–0) | Kentucky (4–1) | Missouri (6–1) | Villanova (8–1) | Kansas State (9–2) | Purdue (11–1) | Kentucky (11–2) | Notre Dame (14–2) | Texas (14–3) | Texas A&M (17–2) | Kentucky (16–4) | Georgetown (18–5) | Purdue (20–5) | Georgetown (21–6) | Louisville (22–7) | Syracuse (25–6) | Louisville (25–9) | San Diego State (34–3) | 11. |
| 12. | Gonzaga | Gonzaga (2–0) | Missouri (2–0) | Villanova (5–1) | Villanova (6–1) | Missouri (8–1) | Michigan State (8–3) | Kentucky (9–2) | Texas (11–2) | Missouri (14–2) | Kentucky (14–3) | Purdue (17–3) | Villanova (17–4) | Purdue (18–5) | Connecticut (19–5) | Wisconsin (20–6) | Syracuse (24–6) | Florida (24–6) | BYU (30–4) | Pittsburgh (28–6) | 12. |
| 13. | Syracuse | Kentucky (1–0) | Baylor (3–0) | Minnesota (6–1) | Tennessee (6–0) | Georgetown (9–1) | Purdue (10–1) | Minnesota (11–1) | Georgetown (12–2) | Texas A&M (14–1) | Purdue (15–3) | Missouri (17–3) | Louisville (17–4) | Syracuse (20–4) | Arizona (21–4) | Florida (21–5) | North Carolina (22–6) | Wisconsin (23–7) | Florida (26–7) | BYU (32–5) | 13. |
| 14. | Baylor | Missouri (0–0) | Florida (3–1) | Georgetown (6–0) | Memphis (7–0) | Illinois (10–1) | Kentucky (8–2) | Texas (10–2) | BYU (14–1) | Texas (12–3) | Missouri (15–3) | Notre Dame (16–4) | Georgetown (16–5) | Wisconsin (17–5) | Villanova (19–6) | Villanova (21–6) | Florida (22–6) | Louisville (23–8) | Syracuse (26–7) | Notre Dame (27–7) | 14. |
| 15. | Missouri | Washington (1–0) | Memphis (4–0) | Memphis (5–0) | San Diego State (8–0) | Michigan State (7–3) | Baylor (7–1) | Notre Dame (11–1) | Notre Dame (12–2) | Kentucky (12–3) | Louisville (14–3) | Wisconsin (15–4) | Missouri (17–4) | Louisville (18–5) | Florida (20–5) | Connecticut (20–6) | Saint John's (19–9) | Arizona (25–6) | Purdue (25–7) | Wisconsin (25–9) | 15. |
| 16. | Illinois | Illinois (3–0) | Georgetown (5–0) | Florida (5–1) | Kentucky (5–2) | Kentucky (7–2) | Minnesota (10–1) | BYU (12–1) | Texas A&M (12–1) | Illinois (13–3) | Notre Dame (14–4) | Kentucky (15–4) | Texas A&M (17–3) | Arizona (20–4) | Louisville (19–6) | Louisville (20–7) | Connecticut (21–7) | Kentucky (22–8) | Wisconsin (23–8) | Texas (28–8) | 16. |
| 17. | Washington | Baylor (1–0) | Minnesota (5–0) | Tennessee (5–0) | Illinois (8–1) | Purdue (9–1) | Memphis (8–1) | Kansas State (10–3) | Kansas State (11–3) | Louisville (13–2) | Wisconsin (13–4) | Washington (15–4) | Syracuse (18–4) | Utah State (22–2) | Texas A&M (19–5) | Texas A&M (21–5) | Georgetown (21–8) | Utah State (28–3) | Utah State (30–3) | Purdue (26–8) | 17. |
| 18. | Butler | Butler (1–0) | Gonzaga (2–1) | Purdue (5–1) | Purdue (7–1) | BYU (10–0) | Tennessee (7–2) | Texas A&M (11–1) | Central Florida (13–0) | Washington (12–3) | Michigan State (12–5) | Minnesota (15–4) | Wisconsin (15–5) | Kentucky (16–6) | Vanderbilt (18–6) | Vanderbilt (20–6) | Arizona (23–6) | St. John's (20–10) | Arizona (27–7) | Syracuse (27–8) | 18. |
| 19. | Memphis | Memphis (1–0) | Illinois (4–1) | San Diego State (6–0) | UNLV (8–0) | Memphis (7–1) | Florida (8–2) | Michigan State (9–4) | Michigan State (9–4) | Georgetown (12–4) | Minnesota (14–4) | Louisville (15–4) | Washington (15–5) | Florida (18–5) | North Carolina (18–6) | North Carolina (20–6) | Villanova (21–8) | Connecticut (21–9) | St. John's (21–11) | Florida State (23–11) | 19. |
| 20. | Tennessee | Temple (2–0) | Temple (2–0) | Texas (5–1) | Minnesota (7–1) | Minnesota (9–1) | Notre Dame (10–1) | Louisville (10–1) | Illinois (12–3) | Kansas State (12–4) | Washington (13–4) | Georgetown (14–5) | Minnesota (16–5) | Missouri (18–5) | Syracuse (20–6) | Syracuse (22–6) | Vanderbilt (21–7) | Xavier (24–6) | Texas A&M (24–8) | Marquette (22–15) | 20. |
| 21. | Georgetown | Georgetown (1–0) | Texas (3–1) | Illinois (6–1) | BYU (8–0) | Louisville (8–0) | Illinois (10–2) | Central Florida (11–0) | Minnesota (11–3) | Wisconsin (12–3) | Saint Mary's (16–2) | Illinois (14–6) | Utah State (20–2) | North Carolina (17–5) | Missouri (19–6) | Missouri (21–6) | Utah State (26–3) | Texas A&M (23–7) | Vanderbilt (23–10) | Richmond (29–8) | 21. |
| 22. | Temple | Texas (1–0) | San Diego State (4–0) | Washington (3–2) | Washington (5–2) | UNLV (9–1) | Texas (9–2) | Memphis (9–2) | Memphis (11–2) | Central Florida (14–1) | Illinois (13–5) | Vanderbilt (14–4) | Arizona (18–4) | Texas A&M (17–5) | Kentucky (17–7) | Kentucky (19–7) | Texas A&M (22–6) | Georgetown (21–9) | Xavier (24–7) | Louisville (25–10) | 22. |
| 23. | Virginia Tech | Tennessee (1–0) | Butler (2–1) | UNLV (6–0) | Notre Dame (8–0) | Notre Dame (9–1) | BYU (10–1) | Baylor (8–3) | Louisville (11–2) | Temple (11–3) | Georgetown (13–5) | Florida (15–4) | Florida (16–5) | Saint Mary's (20–4) | Saint Mary's (22–4) | Utah State (25–3) | Kentucky (20–8) | Kansas State (22–9) | Washington (23–10) | Washington (24–11) | 23. |
| 24. | Wisconsin | Virginia Tech (1–0) | Tennessee (3–0) | Gonzaga (3–2) | Florida (6–2) | Florida (7–2) | Texas A&M (10–1) | Wisconsin (10–2) | Vanderbilt (11–2) | Michigan State (10–5) | Kansas State (13–5) | Saint Mary's (17–3) | Illinois (14–7) т | Vanderbilt (16–6) | Utah State (23–3) | Temple (21–5) | Missouri (22–7) | Vanderbilt (21–9) | Kansas State (22–10) | Kansas State (23–11) | 24. |
| 25. | Texas | Wisconsin (1–0) | North Carolina (2–2) | BYU (6–0) | Texas (6–2) | Texas (7–2) | Louisville (9–1) | Illinois (10–3) | Cincinnati (14–0) | Minnesota (12–4) | Arizona (15–3) | Utah State (18–2) | Vanderbilt (15–5) т | Minnesota (16–7) | Temple (19–5) | Saint John's (17–9) | George Mason (25–5) | Temple (24–6) | Georgetown (21–10) | Utah State (30–4) | 25. |
| | Preseason Oct 21 | Week 1 Nov 15 | Week 2 Nov 22 | Week 3 Nov 29 | Week 4 Dec 6 | Week 5 Dec 13 | Week 6 Dec 20 | Week 7 Dec 27 | Week 8 Jan 3 | Week 9 Jan 10 | Week 10 Jan 17 | Week 11 Jan 24 | Week 12 Jan 31 | Week 13 Feb 7 | Week 14 Feb 14 | Week 15 Feb 21 | Week 16 Feb 28 | Week 17 Mar 7 | Week 18 Mar 13 | Week 19 Final | |
| | | None | Dropped: Virginia Tech (2–1); Wisconsin (2–1) | Dropped: Temple (3–2); Butler (3–2); North Carolina (4–2) | Dropped: Gonzaga (4–3) | Dropped: Washington (6–3) | Dropped: UNLV (10–2) | Dropped: Tennessee (8–3); Florida (9–3) | Dropped: Baylor (9–3); Wisconsin (11–3) | Dropped: Memphis (12–3); Vanderbilt (11–3); Cincinnati (14–1) | Dropped: Central Florida (14–2); Temple (12–4) | Dropped: Michigan State (12–7); Kansas State (13–7); Arizona (16–4) | Dropped: Saint Mary's (18–4) | Dropped: Washington (15–7); Illinois (15–8) | Dropped: Minnesota (17–8) | Dropped: Saint Mary's (22–6) | Dropped: Temple (22–6) | Dropped: Villanova (21–10); Missouri (22–9); George Mason (26–6) | Dropped: Temple (25–7) | Dropped: St. John's (21–12); Texas A&M (24–9); Vanderbilt (23–11); Xavier (24–8); Georgetown (21–11) | |

== Preseason polls ==
Various publications and news sources release their preseason top 25 months before the season commences.

| | Athlon | Lindy's | Sporting News | Fox Sports | CBS Sports | Rivals.com | Blue Ribbon |
| 1. | Duke | Duke | Michigan State | Duke | Duke | Duke | Duke |
| 2. | Purdue | Purdue | Duke | Purdue | Michigan State | Michigan State | Michigan State |
| 3. | Michigan State | Michigan State | Purdue | Michigan State | Purdue | Kansas | Ohio State |
| 4. | Kansas | Kansas State | Kansas | Ohio State | Ohio State | Pittsburgh | Pittsburgh |
| 5. | Kansas State | Pittsburgh | Ohio State | Kansas State | Pittsburgh | Ohio State | Purdue |
| 6. | Villanova | North Carolina | Kansas State | Pittsburgh | Kansas State | Kansas State | Villanova |
| 7. | Ohio State | Ohio State | Syracuse | Villanova | North Carolina | Villanova | Kansas |
| 8. | Pittsburgh | Butler | Kentucky | Washington | Florida | Syracuse | North Carolina |
| 9. | Syracuse | Illinois | North Carolina | Missouri | Villanova | Baylor | Illinois |
| 10. | Baylor | Washington | Pittsburgh | Florida | Baylor | North Carolina | Kansas State |
| 11. | Gonzaga | Florida | Villanova | Kansas | Memphis | Gonzaga | Gonzaga |
| 12. | North Carolina | Tennessee | Memphis | Illinois | Kansas | Kentucky | Florida |
| 13. | Florida | Villanova | Missouri | North Carolina | Gonzaga | Florida | Syracuse |
| 14. | Missouri | Kentucky | Gonzaga | Memphis | Kentucky | Illinois | Tennessee |
| 15. | Kentucky | Baylor | Illinois | Kentucky | Temple | Missouri | Kentucky |
| 16. | Temple | Gonzaga | Baylor | Gonzaga | Illinois | Butler | Baylor |
| 17. | Memphis | Kansas | Georgetown | Baylor | Missouri | Purdue | Georgetown |
| 18. | Virginia Tech | Virginia Tech | Wisconsin | Florida State | Washington | Memphis | Texas |
| 19. | Illinois | West Virginia | Butler | Minnesota | Butler | Virginia Tech | Memphis |
| 20. | BYU | Texas | Florida | Syracuse | Syracuse | Temple | Missouri |
| 21. | Butler | Syracuse | Virginia Tech | Temple | Tennessee | Washington | Virginia Tech |
| 22. | Washington | San Diego St | Tennessee | San Diego St | San Diego St | San Diego St | BYU |
| 23. | Richmond | Georgia | Washington | Tennessee | Wisconsin | West Virginia | Washington |
| 24. | Wisconsin | Temple | Wichita State | Butler | Georgia | Wisconsin | Temple |
| 25. | Tennessee | BYU | Florida State | BYU | BYU | Tennessee | NC State |
