= 2010–11 Detroit Titans men's basketball team =

American college basketball season

2010–11 Detroit Titans men's basketball
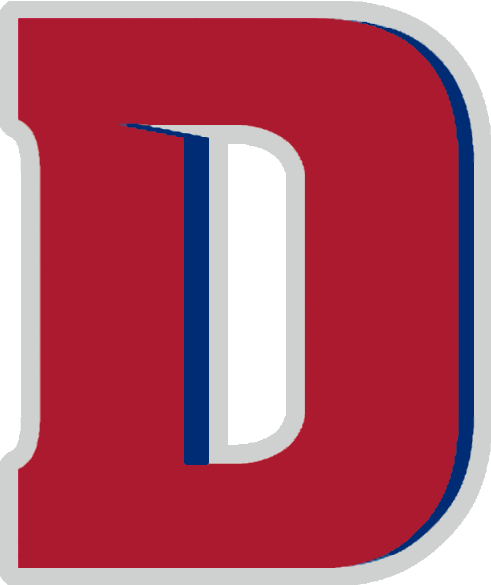
- Conference: Horizon League
- Record: 17–16 (10–8 Horizon)
- Head coach: Ray McCallum
- Assistant coaches: Carlos Briggs (4th season); Jay Smith (3rd season); Derek Thomas (3rd season)
- Home arena: Calihan Hall

2010–11 Horizon League men's basketball standings
	Conf.				Overall
Team	W		L	PCT	W		L	PCT
*Milwaukee	13	–	5	.722	19	–	14	.576
† Butler	13	–	5	.722	28	–	10	.737
Cleveland State	13	–	5	.722	27	–	9	.750
Valparaiso	12	–	6	.667	23	–	12	.657
Wright State	10	–	8	.556	19	–	14	.576
Detroit	10	–	8	.556	17	–	16	.515
Green Bay	8	–	10	.444	14	–	18	.438
Loyola (IL)	7	–	11	.389	16	–	15	.516
Youngstown State	2	–	16	.111	9	–	21	.300
UIC	2	–	16	.111	7	–	24	.226
† 2011 Horizon League Tournament winner * Tournament #1 seed As of April 4, 2011; Rankings from Coaches Poll

The 2010–11 Detroit Titans men's basketball team represented the University of Detroit Mercy in the 2010–11 NCAA Division I men's basketball season. Their head coach is Ray McCallum. The Titans played their home games at Calihan Hall and were members of the Horizon League.

== 2010 recruiting class ==
College recruiting information
Name	Hometown	School	Height	Weight	Commit date
Ray McCallum, Jr. Point Guard	Beverly Hills, MI	Detroit Country Day School	6 ft 1 in (1.85 m)	179 lb (81 kg)	
Ray McCallum, Jr. Point Guard	Recruit ratings: Scout: Rivals: (96)				
Jordan Manuel; Power Forward	Indianapolis, IN	T.C. Howe High School	6 ft 9 in (2.06 m)	190 lb (86 kg)	
Jordan Manuel; Power Forward	Recruit ratings: Scout: Rivals: (90)				
Frank Williams; Shooting Guard	Raytown, MO	Raytown High School	6 ft 5 in (1.96 m)	141 lb (64 kg)	
Frank Williams; Shooting Guard	Recruit ratings: Scout: Rivals: (89)				
Evan Bruinsma; Power Forward	New Era, MI	Western Michigan Christian High School	6 ft 7 in (2.01 m)	185 lb (84 kg)	
Evan Bruinsma; Power Forward	Recruit ratings: Scout: Rivals: (70)				
Chris Blake; Shooting Guard	Mobile, AL	Trinity Valley C.C.	6 ft 4 in (1.93 m)	190 lb (86 kg)	
Chris Blake; Shooting Guard	Recruit ratings: Scout: Rivals: (40)				
Nick Minnerath; Power Forward	Truro, MA	Jackson C.C.	6 ft 8 in (2.03 m)	205 lb (93 kg)	
Nick Minnerath; Power Forward	Recruit ratings: Scout: Rivals: (40)				
Overall recruit ranking:
Note: In many cases, Scout, Rivals, 247Sports, On3, and ESPN may conflict in their listings of height and weight.; In these cases, the average was taken. ESPN grades are on a 100-point scale.; Sources: "ESPN – Detroit Titans Basketball Recruiting 2010". ESPN.; "2010 Team Ranking". Rivals.

== Roster ==
2010–11 Detroit Titans men's basketball team
Players
Coaches

Pos.	#	Name	Height	Weight	Year	Hometown
G	1	Chase Simon	6 ft 6 in (1.98 m)	210 lb (95 kg)	Jr	Detroit, MI
G	2	Chris Blake	6 ft 5 in (1.96 m)	190 lb (86 kg)	Jr	Mobile, AL
G	3	Ray McCallum, Jr.	6 ft 1 in (1.85 m)	185 lb (84 kg)	Fr	Beverly Hills, MI
G	5	Donavan Foster	5 ft 11 in (1.8 m)	160 lb (73 kg)	Jr	Chicago, IL
G	10	Jason Calliste	6 ft 2 in (1.88 m)	165 lb (75 kg)	So	Scarborough, ON
F/C	20	LaMarcus Lowe	6 ft 11 in (2.11 m)	210 lb (95 kg)	Jr	Flint, MI
G/F	21	Connor Clark	6 ft 7 in (2.01 m)	200 lb (91 kg)	Fr	Parma, MI
F	24	John Hoskins	6 ft 10 in (2.08 m)	210 lb (95 kg)	So	Warren, MI
F/C	32	Eli Holman	6 ft 10 in (2.08 m)	255 lb (116 kg)	Jr	Richmond, CA
F	33	Evan Bruinsma	6 ft 7 in (2.01 m)	205 lb (93 kg)	Fr	New Era, MI
F	34	Nick Minnerath	6 ft 8 in (2.03 m)	220 lb (100 kg)	Fr	Truro, MA

Head coach

- Ray McCallum (Ball State)

Assistant coach(es)

- Carlos Briggs (Baylor)
- Jay Smith (Saginaw Valley State)
- Derek Thomas (Missouri–St. Louis)

Legend

- (C) Team captain
- (S) Suspended
- (I) Ineligible
- (W) Walk-on
- Injured
- Current redshirt

Roster
Last update: 2010-11-12

== Schedule ==
Date time, TV	Rank^{#}	Opponent^{#}	Result	Record	Site city, state
Exhibition
October 30*; 4:30 pm		Hillsdale	W 82–60		Calihan Hall; Detroit, MI
November 6*; 4:30 pm		Lake Superior State	W 101–61		Calihan Hall; Detroit, MI
Regular season
November 13*; 9:30 pm, LoboTV		at New Mexico	L 54–63	0–1	The Pit; Albuquerque, NM
November 16*; 7:00 pm, ESPN3		at No. 11 Syracuse	L 55–66	0–2	Carrier Dome; Syracuse, NY
November 19*; 7:30 pm, HLN		Indiana Tech	W 93–62	1–2	Calihan Hall; Detroit, MI
November 22*; 8:00 pm		at Mississippi State	L 76–82	1–3	Humphrey Coliseum; Starkville, MS
November 26*; 7:30 pm, HLN		Albany	W 84–82 ^{2OT}	2–3	Calihan Hall; Detroit, MI
November 27*; 7:00 pm, HLN		Bowling Green	W 71–62	3–3	Calihan Hall; Detroit, MI
November 28*; 5:30 pm, HLN		Niagara	W 96–77	4–3	Calihan Hall; Detroit, MI
December 1*; 7:00 pm, HLN		Akron	L 69–77	4–4	Calihan Hall; Detroit, MI
December 4; 12:00 pm, HLN		Wright State	W 78–69	5–4 (1–0)	Calihan Hall; Detroit, MI
December 8*; 7:00 pm, Bronco Insider		at Western Michigan	L 69–71	5–5	University Arena; Kalamazoo, MI
December 11*; 2:00 pm, Eagles All-Access		at Eastern Michigan	W 68–65 ^{OT}	6–5	Convocation Center; Ypsilanti, MI
December 18*; 7:00 pm, ESPNU		at Central Michigan	W 75–49	7–5	McGuirk Arena; Mt. Pleasant, MI
December 22*; 8:05 pm, Bradley All-Access		at Bradley	L 65–73	7–6	Carver Arena; Peoria, IL
December 30; 7:00 pm, HLN		Green Bay	W 79–56	8–6 (2–0)	Calihan Hall; Detroit, MI
January 1; 1:00 pm, HLN		Milwaukee	L 81–84 ^{OT}	8–7 (2–1)	Calihan Hall; Detroit, MI
January 6; 8:00 pm, HLN		at Loyola Chicago	W 83–71	9–7 (3–1)	Joseph J. Gentile Center; Chicago, IL
January 8; 2:00 pm, HLN		at UIC	W 72–69	10–7 (4–1)	UIC Pavilion; Chicago, IL
January 14; 7:00 pm, ESPNU		Butler	L 63–87	10–8 (4–2)	Calihan Hall; Detroit, MI
January 16; 1:00 pm, HLN		Valparaiso	L 68–78	10–9 (4–3)	Calihan Hall; Detroit, MI
January 20; 7:30 pm, HLN		at Cleveland State	L 69–81	10–10 (4–4)	Wolstein Center; Cleveland, OH
January 22; 7:05 pm, HLN		at Youngstown State	W 73–69	11–10 (5–4)	Beeghly Center; Youngstown, OH
January 28; 9:00 pm, ESPNU		at Milwaukee	L 67–72	11–11 (5–5)	U.S. Cellular Arena; Milwaukee, WI
January 30; 2:00 pm, HLN		at Green Bay	L 74–85	11–12 (5–6)	Resch Center; Green Bay, WI
February 3; 7:00 pm, HLN		UIC	W 77–63	12–12 (6–6)	Calihan Hall; Detroit, MI
February 5; 2:00 pm, HLN		Loyola Chicago	W 81–71	13–12 (7–6)	Calihan Hall; Detroit, MI
February 7; 7:00 pm, HLN		Cleveland State	W 81–78	14–12 (8–6)	Calihan Hall; Detroit, MI
February 10; 8:05 pm, HLN		at Valparaiso	L 74–82	14–13 (8–7)	Athletics-Recreation Center; Valparaiso, IN
February 12; 8:00 pm, ESPN2		at Butler	L 51–66	14–14 (8–8)	Hinkle Fieldhouse; Indianapolis, IN
February 16; 7:00 pm, HLN		Youngstown State	W 91–79	15–14 (9–8)	Calihan Hall; Detroit, MI
February 19*; 8:05 pm		at Drake; ESPN BracketBusters	L 76–84	15–15	Knapp Center; Des Moines, IA
February 25; 7:00 pm, ESPNU		at Wright State	W 77–67	16–15 (10–8)	Nutter Center; Dayton, OH
Horizon League tournament
March 1; 7:00 pm, HLN	(5)	(8) Loyola Chicago; First Round	W 90–69	17–15	Calihan Hall; Detroit, MI
March 4; 8:30 pm, ESPN3	(5)	vs. (4) Valparaiso; Quarterfinals	L 78–88	17–16	U.S. Cellular Arena; Milwaukee, WI
*Non-conference game. ^{#}Rankings from Coaches' Poll. (#) Tournament seedings in parentheses. All times are in Eastern Time..

== Game by game summary ==
November 2010

Team	1st Half	2nd Half	Final
UDM	21	33	54
UNM	32	31	63

11/13/2010 – Detroit at New Mexico
The Titans opened the season with an 11-point loss to the New Mexico Lobos of the Mountain West Conference with a final score of 63–54. Junior Eli Holman led the team in scoring with 15 points and also grabbed 13 rebounds. The game was described as sloppy, with both teams committing a combined 40 turnovers. Detroit shot 4 of 22 from beyond the arc and shot 31% from the field.

Team	1st Half	2nd Half	Final
UDM	28	25	55
SYR	25	41	66

11/16/2010 – Detroit at #11 Syracuse
Detroit played aggressive on defense and hit a few well-timed shots, putting the Titans up 28 to 25 at half-time. However, Syracuse went on a 17–4 run in the first six minutes of the second half to take a commanding lead at 42–32. Syracuse proceeded to turn the ball over three straight times, resulting in a 10–2 rally by Detroit that cut the lead to just two points with the score 44–42 with 9:29 to go in the game. Syracuse responded with a 13–2 run to make the game 53–42 at 8:20, and Detroit would not come close for the rest of the game. The Titans of Detroit fell to the 11th ranked team in the country, Syracuse, 66–55. Eli Holman led the team in points and rebounds for the second straight game, scoring 17 and pulling down 10 boards.

Team	1st Half	2nd Half	Final
IT	28	34	62
UDM	45	48	93

11/19/2010 – Detroit vs Indiana Tech
Detroit had its home opener at Callihan Hall against the NCAA Division II Indiana Tech Warriors. The Titans routed Indiana Tech en route to a 93–62 victory. Detroit shot 54% from the field on 31 of 57 shooting. Chase Simon and Eli Holman both pulled down 7 rebounds each. Holman led the team in scoring for the third game in a row, scoring 21 points in front of a crowd of almost 3,000.

Team	1st Half	2nd Half	Final
UDM	32	44	76
MSU	40	42	82

11/22/2010 – Detroit at Mississippi State
The Titans traveled to Starkville, Mississippi to go up against the Mississippi State Bulldogs of the Southeastern Conference. The Bulldogs opened the game with an 18–12 lead just 4 minutes into the game, but the Titans fought back to take a 22–18 lead with 12:44 left in the half. Mississippi State went on the offensive, taking a commanding 40–32 lead at half-time. Detroit avoided foul trouble to help stay in the game, not allowing Mississippi State a single free throw attempt until the second half. Detroit opened up the final frame by making 9 of 14 shots from the field in the first 8 minutes, bringing the Titans within a single basket at 57–54. The Bulldogs pushed the lead back to 10 at 66–56 with 8:42 left in the game, but the Titans did not go away, hitting several layups and jump shots down the stretch to be down by just 3 once again at 76–73 with just over a minute to play. The Titans missed many key free throws in the final 1:14. The Bulldogs made 6-of-8 in the last 28 seconds of the game to put Detroit away 82–76. Jason Calliste led the Titans in scoring with 20 points. Ray McCallum, Jr. and Chase Simon scored 16 and 17 points apiece, but combined a 0 for 9 effort on 3-Pointers. Eli Holman led the team in rebounds for the fourth straight game, grabbing 10 against the Bulldogs.

Team	1st Half	2nd Half	OT	2OT	Final
ALB	42	26	4	10	82
UDM	39	29	4	12	84

11/26/2010 – Detroit vs Albany
The Albany Great Danes were very strong from three-point land, hitting 9 of 14 in the first half and 14 of 27 overall. As a result of their barrage, they led at half-time against the Titans 42–39. Detroit battled back to take the lead, but Albany hit a three pointer as time expired, tying the game at 68 at the end of regulation. The Titans led throughout most of the first overtime, but with the clock running down and Detroit up 72–69, Billy Allen of Albany again hit a three pointer as the buzzer sounded. In the second overtime, the Titans quickly built a six-point lead to bring the score to 78–72 and would not relinquish the lead for the rest of the game. A free throw by Ray McCallum put the Titans up 84–82 with 7 seconds to play. Albany's Ralph Watts attempted a last second three-pointer for the win but missed, giving the Detroit Titans their second victory of the season. Eli Holman led the charge for Detroit, scoring a career-high 27 points and grabbing a team-high 15 rebounds.

Team	1st Half	2nd Half	Final
BGSU	24	38	62
UDM	31	40	71

11/27/2010 – Detroit vs Bowling Green
Detroit's second opponent in two nights was the Bowling Green Falcons of the Mid-American Conference. The Titans got out to an 8–0 start and went on to win 71–62. Eli Holman recorded his fourth double-double of the season, scoring 13 points and taking in 14 rebounds. Five Titans had 10 more points on the night, and they shot 55 percent from the field in the second half to keep the Falcons at bay.

Team	1st Half	2nd Half	Final
NIA	33	44	77
UDM	52	44	96

11/28/2010 – Detroit vs Niagara
Detroit's final challenge in the Legends Classic was to get past the Niagara Purple Eagles of the Metro Atlantic Athletic Conference. Niagara started the game with a dunk, but not long after that the Titans rattled off a 9–0 run. The Titans' Nick Minnerath answered Niagara's dunk with one of his own, sparking a large run to the end of the half where Detroit was up 52–33, shooting 53% from the field.

The Titans started the second half picking up where they left off, going on an 8–0 run to bring their lead to 27. Detroit took a then season-low six three-point field goal attempts, opting instead to pound it inside and take jumpers which led to an overall shooting percentage of 48% on the evening. This was a radical change from their offensive scheme against Syracuse earlier in the season, and it paid off with an easy 96–77 win over the Purple Eagles.

Five Titans were in double figures in points on the night. Two of them recorded double-doubles for the Titans. LaMarcus Lowe had 12 points and 10 rebounds, while Eli Holman recorded his 6th double-double in 7 games, posting up 11 points and grabbing 10 rebounds. Ray McCallum led the team in scoring with 21 points while Jason Calliste put up a strong performance of 17 points on just 3 field goals in 6 attempts, but also 9 for 10 from the free throw line. Minnerath and Holman were named to the Legends Classic All-Tournament Team, with Holman taking Most Valuable Player honors.

December 2010

Team	1st Half	2nd Half	Final
AKR	36	41	77
UDM	37	32	69

12/1/2010 – Detroit vs Akron
Detroit entered its second game of five against the MAC, this time hosting the Akron Zips. Chase Simon had a season-high 24 points including 20 in the second half, Eli Holman came just short of another double-double with a 13 rebounds and 9 points, and Ray McCallum contributed with 8 points, 10 assists, and 6 rebounds, but it proved to not be enough. The Titans fought to keep pace with Akron all game long, being down by one 37–36 at half-time, but the Zips' play in the second half overwhelmed Detroit in the second with Akron's lead ballooning as high as 11, leading to the Titans' first home loss of the season 77–69. It was the first lost for the Titans against a MAC school in seven games, and Akron also broke Detroit's nine straight wins against non-conference opponents at home.

Team	1st Half	2nd Half	Final
WSU	30	39	69
UDM	39	39	78

12/4/2010 – Detroit vs Wright State
Detroit opened Horizon League play at home against the Wright State Raiders. The Titans scored 10 of the first 12 points in the game, and never trailed. In the first half, Eli Holman hit for 5–6 from the field with 12 points and 8 rebounds, leading Detroit to a 39–30 lead at the half. Wright State fought back in the second half to get the lead to as little as 67–64, but Detroit hit the majority of their free throws down the stretch and Holman capped it off with a dunk with 21 seconds remaining as he helped the Titans win 78–69. Jason Calliste led all scorers with 20 points on 4–of–5 shooting, all for threes, and 8–of–11 on free throws. Holman had 17 points and 12 rebounds, and Ray McCallum added 14 points, 6 rebounds, and 4 assists.

Team	1st Half	2nd Half	Final
UDM	27	42	69
WMU	33	38	71

12/8/2010 – Detroit at Western Michigan
The Titans began a three-game road trip in the state of Michigan, starting off by facing the Western Michigan Broncos. Western Michigan led by as much as 11 in the opening frame, but Detroit successfully rallied in the last minute to cut the lead to 6 going into the break at 33–27 WMU. The Broncos scored the first 6 points of the second half, but Detroit scored 10 straight to bring the Titans within 2 at 39–37. Ray McCallum hit a three–pointer to tie the game up at 48–48. Western Michigan again got out to a big lead, up 9, but a series of points in the paint tied the game up once again at 66–66 with 2:11 remaining. The Broncos' Mike Douglas hit two free throws and a trey to put his team up five with less than a minute to go. Jason Calliste converted a three–point play to cut the Bronco lead to 2. With just four seconds left, McCallum had his shot blocked, and the Titans failed to get off another clear shot as they fell to Western Michigan 71–69. McCallum led the team in scoring with 19 points. Eli Holman had 14 rebounds and 6 points.
