= Jerry Slocum (basketball) =

American basketball coach

Biographical details
- Born: January 12, 1952 (age 74)
- Education: The King's College

Coaching career (HC unless noted)
- 1975–1987: Nyack
- 1987–1996: Geneva
- 1996–2005: Gannon
- 2005–2017: Youngstown State

Head coaching record
- Overall: 723-556

Accomplishments and honors

Championships
- GLIAC South Division (2000–2002)

Awards
- GLIAC Coach of the Year (2000)

Jerry Slocum (born January 12, 1952) is an American college basketball coach and former head men's basketball coach at Youngstown State University. He graduated from The King's College in Briarcliff Manor, New York in 1975. On March 7, 2017, Slocum announced he was retiring as head coach at Youngstown State. He had a record of 142–232 in 12 years at the school.

== Head coaching record ==
Record table
Season	Team	Overall	Conference	Standing	Postseason
Nyack Warriors (1975–1987)
1975–76	Nyack	10–16			
1976–77	Nyack	17–14			
1977–78	Nyack	8–21			
1978–79	Nyack	8–24			
1979–80	Nyack	10–21			
1980–81	Nyack	17–11			
1981–82	Nyack	20–12			
1982–83	Nyack	20–13			
1983–84	Nyack	21–9			
1984–85	Nyack	25–8			
1985–86	Nyack	21–9			
1986–87	Nyack	22–8			
Nyack:		199–166 (.545)			
Geneva Golden Tornadoes (1987–1996)
1987–88	Geneva	6–21			
1988–89	Geneva	20–15			
1989–90	Geneva	22–9			
1990–91	Geneva	22-8			NAIA First Round
1991–92	Geneva	27–7			
1992–93	Geneva	28–3			NAIA Division I First Round
1993–94	Geneva	28–4			
1994–95	Geneva	26–6			NAIA Division I Second Round
1995–96	Geneva	24–7			NAIA Division I Quarterfinals
Geneva:		203–80 (.717)			
Gannon Golden Knights (Great Lakes Intercollegiate Athletic Conference) (1996–2005)
1996–97	Gannon	18–9	9–8	2nd (South)	
1997–98	Gannon	16–11	9–8	T–2nd (South)	
1998–99	Gannon	19–9	12–7	T–2nd (South)	
1999–00	Gannon	23–5	16–3	1st (South)	NCAA Division II First Round
2000–01	Gannon	22–8	13–4	T–1st (South)	NCAA Division II First Round
2001–02	Gannon	21–7	12–5	T–1st (South)	NCAA Division II First Round
2002–03	Gannon	20–10	11–6	2nd (South)	NCAA Division II First Round
2003–04	Gannon	22–8	12–5	2nd (South)	NCAA Division II First Round
2004–05	Gannon	18–11	11–6	T–2nd (South)	NCAA Division II First Round
Gannon:		179–78 (.696)	104–52 (.667)		
Youngstown State Penguins (Horizon League) (2005–2017)
2005–06	Youngstown State	7–21	4–12	9th	
2006–07	Youngstown State	14–17	7–9	T–4th	
2007–08	Youngstown State	9–21	5–13	9th	
2008–09	Youngstown State	11–19	7–11	T–6th	
2009–10	Youngstown State	8–22	2–16	10th	
2010–11	Youngstown State	9–21	2–16	T–9th	
2011–12	Youngstown State	16–15	10–8	T–6th	
2012–13	Youngstown State	18–16	7–9	5th	CIT Second Round
2013–14	Youngstown State	15–17	6–10	7th	
2014–15	Youngstown State	11–21	2–14	9th	
2015–16	Youngstown State	11–21	6–12	7th	
2016–17	Youngstown State	13–21	5–12		
Youngstown State:		142–232 (.381)	63–142 (.307)		
Total:		723–556 (.565)			
National champion Postseason invitational champion Conference regular season champion Conference regular season and conference tournament champion Division regular season champion Division regular season and conference tournament champion Conference tournament champion

== See also ==
- List of college men's basketball coaches with 600 wins
