= 2010–11 Valparaiso Crusaders men's basketball team =

American college basketball season

2010–11 Valparaiso Crusaders men's basketball
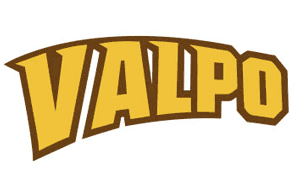

CIT First Round, L 77–85 vs. Iona
- Conference: Horizon League
- Record: 23–12 (12–6 Horizon)
- Head coach: Homer Drew
- Home arena: Athletics-Recreation Center

2010–11 Horizon League men's basketball standings
	Conf.				Overall
Team	W		L	PCT	W		L	PCT
*Milwaukee	13	–	5	.722	19	–	14	.576
† Butler	13	–	5	.722	28	–	10	.737
Cleveland State	13	–	5	.722	27	–	9	.750
Valparaiso	12	–	6	.667	23	–	12	.657
Wright State	10	–	8	.556	19	–	14	.576
Detroit	10	–	8	.556	17	–	16	.515
Green Bay	8	–	10	.444	14	–	18	.438
Loyola (IL)	7	–	11	.389	16	–	15	.516
Youngstown State	2	–	16	.111	9	–	21	.300
UIC	2	–	16	.111	7	–	24	.226
† 2011 Horizon League Tournament winner * Tournament #1 seed As of April 4, 2011; Rankings from Coaches Poll

The 2010–11 Valparaiso Crusaders men's basketball team represented Valparaiso University in the 2010–11 NCAA Division I men's basketball season. Their head coach was Homer Drew. The Crusaders played their home games at the Athletics-Recreation Center and are members of the Horizon League. They finished the season 23–12, 12–6 in Horizon League play. They lost in the semifinals of the 2011 Horizon League men's basketball tournament to Milwaukee. They were invited to the 2011 CollegeInsider.com Tournament where they lost in the first round to Iona.

== Roster ==
2010–11 Valparaiso Crusaders men's basketball team
Players
Coaches

Pos.	#	Name	Height	Weight	Year	Hometown
F	1	Michael Rogers	6 ft 6 in (1.98 m)	215 lb (98 kg)	Sr	Kingston, JM
C	3	Hrvoje Vucic	7 ft 1 in (2.16 m)	220 lb (100 kg)	RS Fr	Glavice, HR
F	4	Cory Johnson	6 ft 7 in (2.01 m)	225 lb (102 kg)	Sr	Duluth, MN
F	5	Cameron Witt	6 ft 9 in (2.06 m)	215 lb (98 kg)	Jr	Launceston, TAS, AU
G	11	Nick Shelton	5 ft 11 in (1.8 m)	150 lb (68 kg)	Jr	Frankenmuth, MI
G	14	Howard Little	6 ft 3 in (1.91 m)	205 lb (93 kg)	Sr	Chicago, IL
G	15	Erik Buggs	5 ft 10 in (1.78 m)	155 lb (70 kg)	RS So	Memphis, TN
G	20	Tommy Kurth	6 ft 1 in (1.85 m)	175 lb (79 kg)	RS So	Osceola, IN
G	22	Jay Harris	6 ft 1 in (1.85 m)	160 lb (73 kg)	Fr	Aurora, IL
G	23	Matt Kenney	6 ft 3 in (1.91 m)	205 lb (93 kg)	So	Mooresville, IN
G	32	Brandon Wood	6 ft 2 in (1.88 m)	190 lb (86 kg)	Jr	Kokomo, IN
G	45	Ryan Broekhoff	6 ft 6 in (1.98 m)	185 lb (84 kg)	So	Frankston, VIC, AU
F	55	Kevin van Wijk	6 ft 8 in (2.03 m)	230 lb (104 kg)	So	Hoofddorp, NL

Head coach

- Homer Drew (William Jewell)

Assistant coach(es)

- Bryce Drew (Valparaiso)
- Luke Gore (Bethel (TN))
- Chris Sparks (Valparaiso)

Legend

- (C) Team captain
- (S) Suspended
- (I) Ineligible
- (W) Walk-on
- Injured
- Current redshirt

Roster
Last update: 2010-11-12

== Schedule ==
Date time, TV	Rank^{#}	Opponent^{#}	Result	Record	Site city, state
Exhibition
October 30*; 9:00 pm		Olivet Nazarene	W 93–58	—	Athletics–Recreation Center; Valparaiso, IN
November 6*; 5:00 pm		Aurora	W 98–66	—	Athletics–Recreation Center; Valparaiso, IN
Regular season
November 12*; 8:05 pm		Indiana–Northwest	W 111–64	1–0	Athletics–Recreation Center (3,078); Valparaiso, IN
November 15*; 8:00 pm, ESPN3		at No. 6 Kansas	L 44–79	1–1	Allen Fieldhouse (16,300); Lawrence, KS
November 18*; 8:05 pm		Purdue–North Central	W 98–44	2–1	Athletics–Recreation Center (2,564); Valparaiso, IN
November 23*; 7:00 pm		at Ohio	L 75–78	2–2	Convocation Center (4,086); Athens, OH
November 26*; 7:00 pm		vs. Northern Colorado; Las Vegas Invitational	W 76–61	3–2	Orleans Arena (4,010); Paradise, NV
November 27*; 7:00 pm		vs. Texas A&M–Corpus Christi; Las Vegas Invitational	W 68–62	4–2	Orleans Arena (5,120); Paradise, NV
December 2; 8:00 pm		at UIC	W 68–66 ^{OT}	5–2 (1–0)	UIC Pavilion (3,042); Chicago, IL
December 4; 4:00 pm		at Loyola Chicago	W 66–56	6–2 (2–0)	Joseph J. Gentile Center (2,472); Chicago, IL
December 7*; 9:00 pm, ESPNU		Purdue	L 58–76	6–3	Athletics–Recreation Center (5,432); Valparaiso, IN
December 11*; 7:00 pm		at Toledo	L 72–75 ^{OT}	6–4	Savage Arena (4,078); Toledo, OH
December 18*; 8:00 pm		IPFW	W 63–47	7–4	Athletics–Recreation Center (2,455); Valparaiso, IN
December 20*; 5:00 pm		vs. Eastern Michigan; Lou Henson Award Tournament	W 74–67	8–4	Athletics Center O'rena (507); Rochester, MI
December 21*; 7:00 pm		at Oakland; Lou Henson Award Tournament	W 103–102	9–4	Athletics Center O'rena (2,175); Rochester, MI
December 28*; 8:05 pm		Ball State	W 69–52	10–4	Athletics–Recreation Center (4,476); Valparaiso, IN
January 1; 2:00 pm, WNDY/ESPN3		at Butler	L 59–76	10–5 (2–1)	Hinkle Fieldhouse (8,024); Indianapolis, IN
January 7; 7:00 pm, ESPN3		Youngstown State	W 79–55	11–5 (3–1)	Athletics–Recreation Center (2,848); Valparaiso, IN
January 9; 2:35 pm		Cleveland State	W 64–58	12–5 (4–1)	Athletics–Recreation Center (3,776); Valparaiso, IN
January 14; 7:00 pm, ESPN3		at Wright State	W 71–60	13–5 (5–1)	Nutter Center (8,398); Dayton, OH
January 16; 1:00 pm		at Detroit	W 78–68	14–5 (6–1)	Calihan Hall (4,183); Detroit, MI
January 21; 7:00 pm, ESPN3		Milwaukee	W 60–43	15–5 (7–1)	Athletics–Recreation Center (3,376); Valparaiso, IN
January 23; 2:35 pm		Green Bay	L 61–63	15–6 (7–2)	Athletics–Recreation Center (2,953); Valparaiso, IN
January 29; 2:00 pm		Butler	W 85–79 ^{OT}	16–6 (8–2)	Athletics–Recreation Center (5,432); Valparaiso, IN
February 3; 7:00 pm		at Cleveland State	L 65–76	16–7 (8–3)	Wolstein Center (4,472); Cleveland, OH
February 5; 7:05 pm		at Youngstown State	W 86–78 ^{OT}	17–7 (9–3)	Beeghly Center (2,206); Youngstown, OH
February 10; 8:05 pm		Detroit	W 82–74	18–7 (10–3)	Athletics–Recreation Center (2,877); Valparaiso, IN
February 12; 8:05 pm		Wright State	W 58–56	19–7 (11–3)	Athletics–Recreation Center (4,533); Valparaiso, IN
February 16; 8:00 pm		at Milwaukee	L 76–79	19–8 (11–4)	U.S. Cellular Arena (4,173); Milwaukee, WI
February 19*; 5:00 pm, ESPN2		Missouri State; ESPN BracketBusters	W 80–67	20–8	Athletics–Recreation Center (5,328); Valparaiso, IN
February 21; 8:00 pm		at Green Bay	L 80–81 ^{OT}	20–9 (11–5)	Resch Center (3,548); Green Bay, WI
February 24; 8:05 pm		Loyola Chicago	L 48–68	20–10 (11–6)	Athletics–Recreation Center (2,479); Valparaiso, IN
February 26; 8:05 pm		UIC	W 79–65	21–10 (12–6)	Athletics–Recreation Center (2,866); Valparaiso, IN
Horizon League tournament
March 1; 8:00 pm	(4)	(9) Youngstown State; Horizon First Round	W 80–71	22–10	Athletics-Recreation Center (1,201); Valparaiso, IN
March 4; 8:30 pm, ESPN3	(4)	vs. (5) Detroit; Horizon Quarterfinals	L 78–88	23–10	U.S. Cellular Arena (2,357); Milwaukee, WI
March 5; 8:30 pm, ESPNU	(4)	at (1) Milwaukee; Horizon Semifinals	L 63–70	23–11	U.S. Cellular Arena (7,431); Milwaukee, WI
CollegeInsider.com tournament
March 16*; 8:05 pm, FCS Broadband		Iona; CIT First Round	L 77–85	23–12	Athletics-Recreation Center (1,482); Valparaiso, IN
*Non-conference game. ^{#}Rankings from Coaches' Poll. (#) Tournament seedings in parentheses. All times are in Eastern Time..
