= 2010–11 Horizon League men's basketball season =

- League: NCAA Division I
- Sport: Basketball
- Duration: December 2, 2010 through February 28, 2011
- Teams: 10
- TV partner(s): Fox Sports Midwest, ESPN, CBS Sports, Horizon League Network

2010–11
- Regular Season Champions: 13–5 – Butler; 13–5 – Cleveland State; 13–5 – Milwaukee
- Season MVP: Norris Cole, CSU
- Top scorer: 21.6 – Norris Cole, CSU

2011 Horizon League Men's Basketball Tournament
- Champions: Butler
- Runners-up: Milwaukee
- Finals MVP: Matt Howard, Butler

Horizon League men's basketball seasons
- ← 2009–10 2011–12 →

2010–11 Horizon League men's basketball standings
	Conf.				Overall
Team	W		L	PCT	W		L	PCT
*Milwaukee	13	–	5	.722	19	–	14	.576
† Butler	13	–	5	.722	28	–	10	.737
Cleveland State	13	–	5	.722	27	–	9	.750
Valparaiso	12	–	6	.667	23	–	12	.657
Wright State	10	–	8	.556	19	–	14	.576
Detroit	10	–	8	.556	17	–	16	.515
Green Bay	8	–	10	.444	14	–	18	.438
Loyola (IL)	7	–	11	.389	16	–	15	.516
Youngstown State	2	–	16	.111	9	–	21	.300
UIC	2	–	16	.111	7	–	24	.226
† 2011 Horizon League Tournament winner * Tournament #1 seed As of April 4, 2011; Rankings from Coaches Poll

The 2010–11 Horizon League men's basketball season marked the 31st season of Horizon League basketball.

== Preseason ==
In the preseason, Butler was the conference favorite – returning three starters from their NCAA runner-up team. Butler received all first-place votes in the preseason poll of HL coaches, media, and sports information directors. Detroit captured second in the preseason poll, and Cleveland State finished third for the second consecutive preseason. The preseason player of the year was Shelvin Mack of Butler who was also named to the John R. Wooden Award preseason candidate list.

=== HL Preseason Poll ===
Rank	Team	Votes
1	Butler (48)	480
2	Detroit	381
3	Cleveland State	376
4	Valparaiso	312
5	Milwaukee	259
6	Wright State	256
7	Green Bay	242
8	Loyola	146
9	Illinois-Chicago	121
10	Youngstown	67

=== Preseason All-Horizon ===
==== First Team ====
- Shelvin Mack, Butler
- Norris Cole, Cleveland State
- Matt Howard, Butler
- Rahmon Fletcher, Green Bay
- Brandon Wood, Valparaiso

==== Second Team ====
- Vaughn Duggins, Wright State
- Eli Holman, Detroit
- Cory Johnson, Valparaiso
- Chase Simon, Detroit
- Robo Kreps, UIC

Preseason Player of the Year

- Shelvin Mack, Butler

== Conference awards and honors ==
=== Weekly awards ===
HL Players of the Week
Throughout the conference season, the HL offices name a player of the week.

Week	Player of the week
11/15	Norris Cole, Cleveland State
11/22	Robo Kreps, UIC
11/29	Eli Holman, Detroit
12/6	Norris Cole, Cleveland State
12/13	Ray McCallum, Jr., Detroit
12/20	Matt Howard, Butler
12/27	Matt Howard, Butler; Brandon Wood, Valparaiso
1/3	Trevon Harmon, Cleveland State
1/10	Cory Johnson, Valparaiso
1/17	Brandon Wood, Valparaiso
1/24	Norris Cole, Cleveland State
1/31	Vaughn Duggins, Wright State
2/7	Anthony Hill, Milwaukee
2/14	Norris Cole, Cleveland State
2/21	Norris Cole, Cleveland State
2/28	Tone Meier, Milwaukee

=== All-Conference Honors ===
Honor	Recipient(s)	School	Position	Year
Player of the Year	Norris Cole	Cleveland State	Guard	Senior
Coach of the Year	Rob Jeter	Milwaukee	Head coach	6th
Newcomer of the Year	Ray McCallum, Jr.	Detroit	Guard	Freshman
Defensive Player of the Year	Norris Cole	Cleveland State	Guard	Senior
Sixth Man of the Year	Geoff McCammon	Loyola	Guard	Senior
All Horizon League First Team	Norris Cole	Cleveland State	Guard	Senior
All Horizon League First Team	Matt Howard	Butler	Forward	Senior
All Horizon League First Team	Vaughn Duggins	Wright State	Guard	Senior
All Horizon League First Team	Anthony Hill	Milwaukee	Forward	Senior
All Horizon League First Team	Brandon Wood	Valparaiso	Guard	Junior
All Horizon League Second Team	Shelvin Mack	Butler	Guard	Junior
All Horizon League Second Team	Rahmon Fletcher	Green Bay	Guard	Senior
All Horizon League Second Team	Ray McCallum, Jr.	Detroit	Guard	Freshman
All Horizon League Second Team	Eli Holman	Detroit	Forward	Junior
All Horizon League Second Team	N'Gai Evans	Wright State	Guard	Senior
All-Newcomer Team	Ray McCallum, Jr.	Detroit	Guard	Freshman
All-Newcomer Team	Kaylon Williams	Milwaukee	Guard	Junior
All-Newcomer Team	Paul Carter	UIC	Forward	Senior
All-Newcomer Team	Alec Brown	Green Bay	Center	Freshman
All-Newcomer Team	Damian Eargle	Youngstown State	Forward	Sophomore
All Defensive Team	Norris Cole	Cleveland State	Guard	Senior
All Defensive Team	Eli Holman	Detroit	Forward	Junior
All Defensive Team	Trevon Harmon	Cleveland State	Guard	Junior
All Defensive Team	Ronald Nored	Butler	Guard	Junior
All Defensive Team	Matt Howard	Butler	Forward	Senior

=== Tournament Honors ===
Matt Howard of Butler was named the tournament MVP for the second consecutive year and is the first Horizon League player to be named to the all-tournament team four times.

Horizon League All-Tournament Team	Player	School	Position	Year
Horizon League All-Tournament Team	Matt Howard	Butler	Forward	Senior
Horizon League All-Tournament Team	Shelvin Mack	Butler	Guard	Junior
Horizon League All-Tournament Team	Shawn Vanzant	Butler	Guard	Senior
Horizon League All-Tournament Team	Anthony Hill	Milwaukee	Forward	Senior
Horizon League All-Tournament Team	Brandon Wood	Valparaiso	Guard	Junior
