= 2011 Horizon League men's basketball tournament =

- Classification: Division I
- Season: 2010–11
- Teams: 10
- First round site: campus sites
- Semifinals site: U.S. Cellular Arena; Milwaukee, Wisconsin
- Finals site: U.S. Cellular Arena; Milwaukee, Wisconsin
- Champions: Butler (7th title)
- Winning coach: Brad Stevens (3rd title)
- MVP: Matt Howard (Butler)
- Television: ESPN, ESPNU, ESPN3 and Horizon League Network

The 2011 Horizon League men's basketball tournament was played Tuesday, March 1 through Tuesday, March 8. The Horizon League Network broadcast the opening rounds, which were played at the home courts of the higher seeds. The quarterfinals and semifinals were broadcast by ESPNU and took place at U.S. Cellular Arena in Milwaukee, the home court of the #1 overall seed, the Milwaukee Panthers.

As Milwaukee defeated Valparaiso in its semifinal match, it secured host status for the championship game against Butler as well; the final was broadcast by ESPN/ESPN3.com. Butler defeated Milwaukee 59–44 in the final, winning its second consecutive Horizon League tournament title and receiving an automatic bid to the 2011 NCAA tournament.

== Seeds ==
All Horizon League schools played in the tournament. Teams were seeded by 2010–11 Horizon League season record, with a tiebreaker system to seed teams with identical conference records. The top 2 teams received a bye to the semifinals.

== Schedule ==
Game	Time*	Matchup^{#}	Television
First Round – Tuesday, March 1
1	7:00 PM	#10 UIC at #3 Cleveland State	HLN
2	7:00 PM	#7 Green Bay at #6 Wright State	HLN
3	8:00 PM	#9 Youngstown State at #4 Valparaiso	HLN
4	7:00 PM	#8 Loyola at #5 Detroit	HLN
Quarterfinals – Friday, March 4
5	8:30 PM	#3 Cleveland State vs. #6 Wright State	HLN/ESPN3.com
6	6:00 PM	#4 Valparaiso vs. #5 Detroit	HLN/ESPN3.com
Semifinals – Saturday, March 5
7	6:00 PM	#3 Cleveland State vs #2 Butler	ESPNU/ESPN3.com
8	8:30 PM	#4 Valparaiso at #1 Milwaukee	ESPNU/ESPN3.com
Championship Game – Tuesday, March 8
9	9pm	#2 Butler at #1 Milwaukee	ESPN/ESPN3.com
*Game Times in ET. #-Rankings denote tournament seeding.

== Bracket ==
First Round; Tuesday, March 1
3	Cleveland State	73
10	UIC	61
6	Wright State	60
7	Green Bay	50
4	Valparaiso	80
9	Youngstown State	71
5	Detroit	90
8	Loyola	69

Second Round; Friday, March 4
3	Cleveland State	73
6	Wright State	59
4	Valparaiso	88
5	Detroit	78

Semifinals; Saturday, March 5
2	Butler	76
3	Cleveland State	68
1	Milwaukee	70
4	Valparaiso	63

Championship; Tuesday, March 8
2	Butler	59
1	Milwaukee	44

First round games at campus sites of lower-numbered seeds
Second round and semifinals hosted by #1 overall seed (Milwaukee)
Championship game hosted by highest remaining seed

== Honors ==
Matt Howard of Butler was named the tournament MVP for the second successive year.

Horizon League All-Tournament Team

Player	School	Position	Year
Matt Howard	Butler	Forward	Senior
Shelvin Mack	Butler	Guard	Junior
Shawn Vanzant	Butler	Guard	Senior
Anthony Hill	Milwaukee	Forward	Senior
Brandon Wood	Valparaiso	Guard	Junior
