= 2010–11 Wright State Raiders men's basketball team =

American college basketball season

2010–11 Wright State Raiders men's basketball
- Conference: Horizon League
- Record: 19–14 (10–8 Horizon)
- Head coach: Billy Donlon
- Assistant coaches: Clayton Bates; Chris Moore; Scott Woods
- Home arena: Nutter Center

2010–11 Horizon League men's basketball standings
	Conf.				Overall
Team	W		L	PCT	W		L	PCT
*Milwaukee	13	–	5	.722	19	–	14	.576
† Butler	13	–	5	.722	28	–	10	.737
Cleveland State	13	–	5	.722	27	–	9	.750
Valparaiso	12	–	6	.667	23	–	12	.657
Wright State	10	–	8	.556	19	–	14	.576
Detroit	10	–	8	.556	17	–	16	.515
Green Bay	8	–	10	.444	14	–	18	.438
Loyola (IL)	7	–	11	.389	16	–	15	.516
Youngstown State	2	–	16	.111	9	–	21	.300
UIC	2	–	16	.111	7	–	24	.226
† 2011 Horizon League Tournament winner * Tournament #1 seed As of April 4, 2011; Rankings from Coaches Poll

The 2010–11 Wright State Raiders men's basketball team represented Wright State University in the 2010–11 NCAA Division I men's basketball season. Their head coach was Billy Donlon, serving his first year. The Raiders played their home games at the Nutter Center and were members of the Horizon League.

== Roster ==
2010–11 Wright State Raiders men's basketball team
Players
Coaches

Pos.	#	Name	Height	Weight	Year	Hometown
G	2	Kegan Clark	6 ft 4 in (1.93 m)	190 lb (86 kg)	Fr	Jeffersonville, IN
G	3	Troy Tabler	6 ft 3 in (1.91 m)	185 lb (84 kg)	Sr	Cincinnati, OH
F	4	Johann Mpondo	6 ft 8 in (2.03 m)	220 lb (100 kg)	Jr	Douala, CM
G	11	N'Gai Evans	6 ft 2 in (1.88 m)	175 lb (79 kg)	Sr	North Canton, OH
F	12	Armond Battle	6 ft 7 in (2.01 m)	200 lb (91 kg)	So	Plymouth, MN
F	14	Cooper Land	6 ft 8 in (2.03 m)	230 lb (104 kg)	Sr	Highland Village, TX
G	21	Vance Hall	6 ft 3 in (1.91 m)	185 lb (84 kg)	Fr	Frankfort, KY
F	22	Cole Darling	6 ft 7 in (2.01 m)	185 lb (84 kg)	Fr	Holt, MI
F	23	A.J. Pacher	6 ft 9 in (2.06 m)	220 lb (100 kg)	Fr	Vandalia, OH
G	24	Matt Vest	6 ft 5 in (1.96 m)	175 lb (79 kg)	Fr	Kettering, OH
G	31	Darian Cartharn	6 ft 0 in (1.83 m)	190 lb (86 kg)	So	Canal Winchester, OH
G	34	Julius Mays	6 ft 3 in (1.91 m)	190 lb (86 kg)	Jr	Marion, IN
F	40	Stephen Gossard	6 ft 6 in (1.98 m)	200 lb (91 kg)	Fr	Waynesville, OH
G	44	Vaughn Duggins	6 ft 3 in (1.91 m)	195 lb (88 kg)	Sr	Pendleton, IN

Head coach

- Billy Donlon (UNC Wilmington)

Assistant coach(es)

- Clayton Bates (Florida)
- Chris Moore (Kentucky State)
- Scott Woods (Rose–Hulman)

Legend

- (C) Team captain
- (S) Suspended
- (I) Ineligible
- (W) Walk-on
- Injured
- Current redshirt

Roster
Last update: 2010-11-12

== Schedule ==
Date time, TV	Rank^{#}	Opponent^{#}	Result	Record	Site (attendance) city, state
Exhibition
November 2*; 7:00 pm		Central State	W 90–59	—	Nutter Center; Dayton, OH
Regular season
November 14*; 7:00 pm, ESPNU		at Indiana	L 44–67	0–1	Assembly Hall (15,261); Bloomington, IN
November 17*; 7:00 pm		Northwood	W 75–55	1–1	Nutter Center (4,601); Dayton, OH
November 21*; 7:00 pm		Southern	W 66–43	2–1	Nutter Center (3,081); Dayton, OH
November 23*; 7:00 pm		Oakland	W 82–79	3–1	Nutter Center (3,327); Dayton, OH
November 26*; 6:00 pm		vs. Richmond; Chicago Invitational Challenge	L 61–71	3–2	Sears Centre (3,392); Hoffman Estates, IL
November 27*		vs. Southern Illinois; Chicago Invitational Challenge	L 50–56	3–3	Sears Centre (2,832); Hoffman Estates, IL
December 1*; 7:00 pm		at Cincinnati	L 69–77	3–4	Fifth Third Arena (5,871); Cincinnati, OH
December 4; 12:00 pm		at Detroit	L 69–78	3–5 (0–1)	Calihan Hall (2,213); Detroit, MI
December 8*; 7:00 pm		Air Force	W 76–61	4–5	Nutter Center (5,542); Dayton, OH
December 11*; 3:00 pm		Tusculum	W 60–47	5–5	Nutter Center (3,267); Dayton, OH
December 14*; 7:00 pm		at Central Michigan	W 53–49	6–5	McGuirk Arena (2,343); Mt. Pleasant, MI
December 18*; 7:00 pm		Miami (OH)	W 66–51	7–5	Nutter Center (4,580); Dayton, OH
December 22*; 7:30 pm		at Charlotte	L 53–57	7–6	Dale F. Halton Arena (5,156); Charlotte, NC
December 30; 7:00 pm		Milwaukee	W 68–44	8–6 (1–1)	Nutter Center (3,678); Dayton, OH
January 1; 1:00 pm		Green Bay	W 67–64	9–6 (2–1)	Nutter Center (3,260); Dayton, OH
January 6; 8:00 pm		at UIC	W 71–63	10–6 (3–1)	UIC Pavilion (2,590); Chicago, IL
January 8; 4:00 pm		at Loyola Chicago	W 58–41	11–6 (4–1)	Joseph J. Gentile Center (2,312); Chicago, IL
January 14; 7:00 pm, ESPN3		Valparaiso	L 60–71	11–7 (4–2)	Nutter Center (8,398); Dayton, OH
January 15; 7:00 pm, ESPN3		Butler	W 69–64	12–7 (5–2)	Nutter Center (7,603); Dayton, OH
January 20; 7:30 pm		at Youngstown State	W 66–62	13–7 (6–2)	Beeghly Center (1,585); Youngstown, OH
January 22; 2:00 pm, HLN		at Cleveland State	L 46–65	13–8 (6–3)	Wolstein Center (4,615); Cleveland, OH
January 28; 8:00 pm, ESPN3		at Green Bay	W 63–61	14–8 (7–3)	Resch Center (3,547); Green Bay, WI
January 30; 2:00 pm		at Milwaukee	L 53–54	14–9 (7–4)	U.S. Cellular Arena (3,021); Milwaukee, WI
February 3; 7:00 pm		Loyola Chicago	W 76–63	15–9 (8–4)	Nutter Center (4,595); Dayton, OH
February 5; 7:00 pm		UIC	W 69–63	16–9 (9–4)	Nutter Center (6,642); Dayton, OH
February 7; 7:00 pm		Youngstown State	W 74–70	17–9 (10–4)	Nutter Center (3,361); Dayton, OH
February 10; 7:00 pm, ESPNU		at Butler	L 63–71	17–10 (10–5)	Hinkle Fieldhouse (6,726); Indianapolis, IN
February 12; 8:00 pm		at Valparaiso	L 56–58	17–11 (10–6)	Athletics-Recreation Center (4,533); Valparaiso, IN
February 16; 7:00 pm		Cleveland State	L 72–74	17–12 (10–7)	Nutter Center (5,768); Dayton, OH
February 19*; 11:00 am, ESPNU		Hofstra; ESPN BracketBusters	W 82–56	18–12	Nutter Center (5,073); Dayton, OH
February 25; 7:00 pm, ESPNU		Detroit	L 67–77	18–13 (10–8)	Nutter Center (6,251); Dayton, OH
Horizon League tournament
March 1; 7:00 pm, HLN	(6)	(7) Green Bay; Horizon First Round	W 60–50	19–13	Nutter Center (2,441); Dayton, OH
March 4; 6:00 pm, ESPN3	(6)	vs. (3) Cleveland State; Horizon Quarterfinals	L 59–73	19–14	U.S. Cellular Arena (2,357); Milwaukee, WI
*Non-conference game. ^{#}Rankings from Coaches' Poll. (#) Tournament seedings in parentheses. All times are in Eastern Time.

== Awards and honors ==
Vaughn Duggins	MVP
N’Gai Evans	MVP
Cooper Land	Raider Award
Vaughn Duggins	First Team All Horizon League
N’Gai Evans	Second Team All Horizon League

== Statistics ==
Number	Name	Games	Average	Points	Assists	Rebounds
44	Vaughn Duggins	33	18.0	593	72	127
11	N'Gai Evans	30	13.7	412	98	118
3	Troy Tabler	24	10.9	262	42	67
14	Cooper Land	26	8.9	231	18	78
22	Cole Darling	30	4.3	129	26	85
24	Matt Vest	33	3.8	124	37	76
23	AJ Pacher	32	3.5	112	11	50
12	Armond Battle	29	3.3	96	6	53
4	Johann Mpondo	33	3.2	107	9	111
2	Kegan Clark	24	1.2	28	13	24
21	Vance Hall	25	1.2	29	5	24
