= 2014–15 Lebanese Basketball League =

The 2014–2015 season was the 19th edition of the Lebanese Basketball League. The regular season began on Friday, December 5, 2014 and ended on Sunday March 1, 2015. The playoffs began on Tuesday, March 3 and ended with the 2015 Finals on Friday May 22, 2015, after Riyadi Beirut defeated UBA (Union Byblos Amchit) in 5 games to win their tenth title (new format).

== Regular season ==
=== Standings ===
#	Team	W	L	GP	FOR	AG	Points
1	Riyadi Beirut	13	1	14	1212	1003	40
2	Sagesse Beirut	10	4	14	1213	1123	33
3	UBA	8	6	14	1100	1092	30
4	Champville SC	7	7	14	1156	1161	28
5	Mouttahed Tripoli	6	8	14	1156	1164	26
6	Tadamon Zouk Mikael	5	9	14	1120	1118	24
7	Homenetmen Beirut	5	9	14	1051	1166	24
8	Hoops Club	3	11	14	917	1098	18

== Playoffs ==
=== Brackets ===
Quarterfinals
1	Riyadi Beirut	3
8	Hoops Club	0
5	Mouttahed Tripoli	0
4	Champville SC	3
3	UBA	3
6	Tadamon Zouk Mikael	0
7	Homenetmen Beirut	1
2	Sagesse Beirut	3

Semifinals
1	Riyadi Beirut	4
4	Champville SC	2
3	UBA	4
2	Sagesse Beirut	0

Finals
1	Riyadi Beirut	4
3	UBA	1

== Statistics leaders ==
Category	Player	Team	Statistic
Points per game	Dewarick Spencer	Mouttahed Tripoli	31.8
Rebounds per game	Michael Fraser	Homenetmen Beirut	14.8
Assists per game	Perry Petty	Mouttahed Tripoli	7.2
Steals per game	Perry Petty	Mouttahed Tripoli	2.8
blocks per game	Julian Khazzouh	Sagesse Beirut	1.7
Turnovers per game	Ali Mezher	Hoops Club	4.7
2FG%	Ratko Varda	UBA	62.3%
3FG%	Julian Khazzouh	Sagesse Beirut	43.8%
FT%	Dewarick Spencer	Mouttahed Tripoli	88.1%
Total 2 points	Jasmon Youngblood	UBA	197
Total 3 points	Jasmon Youngblood	UBA	88
Total FT	Nikoloz Tskitishvilli	Champville SC	169

== Awards ==
- Finals MVP: Fadi EL Khatib, Riyadi Beirut
- Player of the year: Nikoloz Tskitishvili, Champville SC
- Guard of the Year: Jasmon Youngblood, UBA
- Forward of the Year: Fadi El Khatib, Riyadi Beirut
- Center of the Year: Nikoloz Tskitishvili, Champville SC
- Newcomer of the Year: Ali Mezher, Hoops Club
- Import of the Year: Nikoloz Tskitishvili, Champville SC
- Domestic Player of the Year: Fadi El Khatib, Riyadi Beirut
- Defensive Player of the Year: Jean AbdelNour, Riyadi Beirut
- Coach of the Year: Ghassan Sarkis, Champville SC
- First Team:
  - PG: Perry Petty, Mouttahed Tripoli
  - SG: Jasmon Youngblood, UBA
  - F/G: Fadi El Khatib, Riyadi Beirut
  - F/C: Ismail Ahmad, Riyadi Beirut
  - C/F: Nikoloz Tskitishvili, Champville SC
- Second Team:
  - PG: Mohammed Ibrahim, UBA
  - G: Dewarick Spencer, Mouttahed Tripoli
  - F: Jeremiah Massey, Riyadi Beirut
  - F: Bassel Bawji, Champville SC
  - F/C: Eli Holman, Riyadi Beirut
