= 2010–11 Loyola Ramblers men's basketball team =

American college basketball season

2010–11 Loyola Ramblers men's basketball
- Conference: Horizon League
- Record: 16–15 (7–11 Horizon)
- Head coach: Jim Whitesell
- Assistant coaches: Patrick Baldwin; Kevin Mondro; Adam DeMong
- Home arena: Joseph J. Gentile Center

2010–11 Horizon League men's basketball standings
	Conf.				Overall
Team	W		L	PCT	W		L	PCT
*Milwaukee	13	–	5	.722	19	–	14	.576
† Butler	13	–	5	.722	28	–	10	.737
Cleveland State	13	–	5	.722	27	–	9	.750
Valparaiso	12	–	6	.667	23	–	12	.657
Wright State	10	–	8	.556	19	–	14	.576
Detroit	10	–	8	.556	17	–	16	.515
Green Bay	8	–	10	.444	14	–	18	.438
Loyola (IL)	7	–	11	.389	16	–	15	.516
Youngstown State	2	–	16	.111	9	–	21	.300
UIC	2	–	16	.111	7	–	24	.226
† 2011 Horizon League Tournament winner * Tournament #1 seed As of April 4, 2011; Rankings from Coaches Poll

The 2010–11 Loyola Ramblers men's basketball team represented Loyola University Chicago in the 2010–11 NCAA Division I men's basketball season. Their head coach was Jim Whitesell. The Ramblers play edtheir home games at the Joseph J. Gentile Center and were members of the Horizon League. They finished the season 16–15, 7–11 in Horizon League play. The Ramblers lost in the first round of the 2011 Horizon League men's basketball tournament to Detroit.

== Roster ==
2010–11 Loyola Ramblers men's basketball team
Players
Coaches

Pos.	#	Name	Height	Weight	Year	Hometown
G	0	Denzel Brito	6 ft 1 in (1.85 m)	180 lb (82 kg)	Fr	Wareham, MA
G	1	Gabe Kindred	6 ft 1 in (1.85 m)	165 lb (75 kg)	So	Oakland, CA
G/F	2	Jordan Hicks	6 ft 6 in (1.98 m)	205 lb (93 kg)	Jr	Rochester, MN
F	4	Shaun Adams	6 ft 6 in (1.98 m)	190 lb (86 kg)	So	Liberty, MO
F	5	Tom Neary	6 ft 7 in (2.01 m)	195 lb (88 kg)	Jr	Brookfield, WI
G	10	Courtney Stanley	6 ft 1 in (1.85 m)	165 lb (75 kg)	Jr	Philadelphia, PA
G	13	Kevin Muldowney	5 ft 10 in (1.78 m)	160 lb (73 kg)	So	Western Springs, IL
G	14	Chim Kadima	6 ft 4 in (1.93 m)	185 lb (84 kg)	Fr	Milwaukee, WI
G	22	Terrance Hill	6 ft 4 in (1.93 m)	190 lb (86 kg)	Sr	Kansas City, MO
G	23	Geoff McCammon	6 ft 4 in (1.93 m)	200 lb (91 kg)	Sr	Roselle, IL
F	24	Ben Averkamp	6 ft 8 in (2.03 m)	230 lb (104 kg)	So	Germantown, WI
G	30	Ryan Sterling	6 ft 4 in (1.93 m)	205 lb (93 kg)	Sr	Fishers, IN
F	32	Andy Polka	6 ft 7 in (2.01 m)	240 lb (109 kg)	Sr	Oshkosh, WI
F	33	Walt Gibler	6 ft 7 in (2.01 m)	230 lb (104 kg)	Jr	Cincinnati, OH
F	34	Jonathon Gac	6 ft 8 in (2.03 m)	220 lb (100 kg)	Fr	Chicago, IL
C	44	John Benkoske	6 ft 9 in (2.06 m)	220 lb (100 kg)	Jr	Oshkosh, WI

Head coach

- Jim Whitesell (Luther)

Assistant coach(es)

- Patrick Baldwin (Northwestern)
- Kevin Mondro (Detroit Mercy)
- Adam DeMong (Boston College)

Legend

- (C) Team captain
- (S) Suspended
- (I) Ineligible
- (W) Walk-on
- Injured
- Current redshirt

Roster
Last update: 2010-11-12

== Schedule ==
Date time, TV	Rank^{#}	Opponent^{#}	Result	Record	Site city, state
Exhibition
November 6*; 7:00 pm		Robert Morris (IL)	W 88–71	—	Alumni Gym; Chicago, IL
Regular season
November 12*; 8:30 pm		Eastern Kentucky; Loyola Classic	W 73–57	1–0	Joseph J. Gentile Center; Chicago, IL
November 13*; 8:30 pm		Indiana State; Loyola Classic	W 86–74	2–0	Joseph J. Gentile Center; Chicago, IL
November 14*; 6:30 pm		Texas–Pan American; Loyola Classic	W 79–57	3–0	Joseph J. Gentile Center; Chicago, IL
November 18*; 8:00 pm		Eastern Illinois	W 73–62	4–0	Joseph J. Gentile Center; Chicago, IL
November 20*; 7:00 pm		at Western Michigan	W 82–64	5–0	University Arena; Kalamazoo, MI
November 20*; 7:00 pm		Alabama State	W 74–46	6–0	Joseph J. Gentile Center; Chicago, IL
November 27*; 8:00 pm		at San Francisco	W 63–62	7–0	War Memorial Gymnasium; San Francisco, CA
December 1; 8:00 pm		Butler	L 63–65	7–1 (0–1)	Joseph J. Gentile Center; Chicago, IL
December 4; 4:00 pm		Valparaiso	L 56–66	7–2 (0–2)	Joseph J. Gentile Center; Chicago, IL
December 8*; 8:00 pm		SIU Edwardsville	W 78–50	8–2	Joseph J. Gentile Center; Chicago, IL
December 11*; 4:00 pm		No. 5 Kansas State	L 60–68	8–3	Joseph J. Gentile Center; Chicago, IL
December 18*; 2:00 pm		at DePaul	L 74–81	8–4	Allstate Arena; Rosemont, IL
December 22*; 8:00 pm		at Texas–Pan American	W 84–76	9–4	UTPA Fieldhouse; Edinburg, TX
December 30; 7:00 pm		at Cleveland State	L 55–73	9–5 (0–3)	Wolstein Center; Cleveland, OH
January 1; 1:05 pm		at Youngstown State	W 83–53	10–5 (1–3)	Beeghly Center; Youngstown, OH
January 6; 8:00 pm		Detroit	L 71–83	10–6 (1–4)	Joseph J. Gentile Center; Chicago, IL
January 8; 4:00 pm		Wright State	L 41–58	10–7 (1–5)	Joseph J. Gentile Center; Chicago, IL
January 13; 8:00 pm		at Green Bay	L 68–71	10–8 (1–6)	Resch Center; Green Bay, WI
January 15; 2:00 pm		at Milwaukee	W 71–65	11–8 (2–6)	U.S. Cellular Arena; Milwaukee, WI
January 22; 4:00 pm		UIC	W 68–59	12–8 (3–6)	Joseph J. Gentile Center; Chicago, IL
January 27; 8:00 pm		Youngstown State	W 84–71	13–8 (4–6)	Joseph J. Gentile Center; Chicago, IL
January 29; 4:00 pm		Cleveland State	L 70–81	13–9 (4–7)	Joseph J. Gentile Center; Chicago, IL
February 3; 7:00 pm		at Wright State	L 63–76	13–10 (4–8)	Nutter Center; Dayton, OH
February 5; 2:00 pm		at Detroit	L 71–81	13–11 (4–9)	Calihan Hall; Detroit, MI
February 10; 8:00 pm		Milwaukee	L 57–66	13–12 (4–10)	Joseph J. Gentile Center; Chicago, IL
February 12; 4:00 pm		Green Bay	W 79–62	14–12 (5–10)	Joseph J. Gentile Center; Chicago, IL
February 16; 8:00 pm		at UIC	W 67–66 ^{OT}	15–12 (6–10)	UIC Pavilion; Chicago, IL
February 19*; 3:00 pm		Saint Peter's; ESPN BracketBusters	L 67–71	15–13	Joseph J. Gentile Center; Chicago, IL
February 24; 8:05 pm		at Valparaiso	W 68–48	16–13 (7–10)	Athletics-Recreation Center; Valparaiso, IN
February 26; 2:00 pm		at Butler	L 56–63	16–14 (7–11)	Hinkle Fieldhouse; Indianapolis, IN
Horizon League tournament
March 1; 7:00 pm, HLN	(8)	at (5) Detroit; Horizon First Round	L 69–90	16–15	Calihan Hall; Detroit, MI
*Non-conference game. ^{#}Rankings from Coaches' Poll. (#) Tournament seedings in parentheses. All times are in Eastern Time.
