= 2010–11 UIC Flames men's basketball team =

American college basketball season

2010–11 UIC Flames men's basketball
- Conference: Horizon League
- Record: 7–24 (2–16 Horizon)
- Head coach: Howard Moore
- Assistant coaches: Al Biancalana; Mike Mennenga; Donnie Kirksey
- Home arena: UIC Pavilion

2010–11 Horizon League men's basketball standings
	Conf.				Overall
Team	W		L	PCT	W		L	PCT
*Milwaukee	13	–	5	.722	19	–	14	.576
† Butler	13	–	5	.722	28	–	10	.737
Cleveland State	13	–	5	.722	27	–	9	.750
Valparaiso	12	–	6	.667	23	–	12	.657
Wright State	10	–	8	.556	19	–	14	.576
Detroit	10	–	8	.556	17	–	16	.515
Green Bay	8	–	10	.444	14	–	18	.438
Loyola (IL)	7	–	11	.389	16	–	15	.516
Youngstown State	2	–	16	.111	9	–	21	.300
UIC	2	–	16	.111	7	–	24	.226
† 2011 Horizon League Tournament winner * Tournament #1 seed As of April 4, 2011; Rankings from Coaches Poll

The 2010–11 UIC Flames men's basketball team represented the University of Illinois at Chicago in the 2010–11 NCAA Division I men's basketball season. Their head coach was Howard Moore, serving his first year. The Flames played their home games at the UIC Pavilion and were members of the Horizon League. They finished the season 7–24, 2–16 in Horizon League play. The Flames lost in the first round of the 2011 Horizon League men's basketball tournament to Cleveland State.

== Roster ==
2010–11 UIC Flames men's basketball team
Players
Coaches

Pos.	#	Name	Height	Weight	Year	Hometown
G	1	Daniel Barnes	6 ft 2 in (1.88 m)	180 lb (82 kg)	Jr	Oak Park, IL
F	2	Paul Carter	6 ft 8 in (2.03 m)	203 lb (92 kg)	Sr	Little Rock, AR
G	3	Robo Kreps	6 ft 0 in (1.83 m)	180 lb (82 kg)	Sr	Forsyth, IL
G	14	Corey Gray	5 ft 10 in (1.78 m)	160 lb (73 kg)	So	Missouri City, TX
G	15	Jimmy Harding	6 ft 5 in (1.96 m)	165 lb (75 kg)	Sr	Minooka, IL
G	20	Anthony Kelley	6 ft 6 in (1.98 m)	180 lb (82 kg)	So	Aurora, IL
G	21	Matt Bush	6 ft 4 in (1.93 m)	195 lb (88 kg)	Jr	Quincy, IL
G	22	Dipanjot Singh	6 ft 3 in (1.91 m)	190 lb (86 kg)	Sr	Evanston, IL
G	23	Zavion Neely	6 ft 1 in (1.85 m)	170 lb (77 kg)	Jr	Chicago, IL
F	25	Eddie Denard	6 ft 7 in (2.01 m)	215 lb (98 kg)	Fr	Chicago, IL
G	31	Arman Rasul	6 ft 4 in (1.93 m)	200 lb (91 kg)	So	Chicago, IL
C	32	Darrin Williams	6 ft 9 in (2.06 m)	270 lb (122 kg)	Jr	Louisville, KY
G	33	Shawn King	6 ft 4 in (1.93 m)	200 lb (91 kg)	Fr	Gilbert, AZ
F	34	Paris Carter	6 ft 7 in (2.01 m)	230 lb (104 kg)	Jr	Lansing, IL
F	35	Brad Birton	6 ft 7 in (2.01 m)	220 lb (100 kg)	Sr	Chicago, IL
C	44	K.C. Robbins	6 ft 11 in (2.11 m)	270 lb (122 kg)	Sr	Falmouth, ME
C	45	Dorian Tyler	6 ft 9 in (2.06 m)	230 lb (104 kg)	Fr	Chicago, IL

Head coach

- Howard Moore (Wisconsin)

Assistant coach(es)

- Al Biancalana (Elmhurst)
- Mike Mennenga (Morehead State)
- Donnie Kirksey (Roosevelt)

Legend

- (C) Team captain
- (S) Suspended
- (I) Ineligible
- (W) Walk-on
- Injured
- Current redshirt

Roster
Last update: 2010-11-12

== Schedule ==
Date time, TV	Rank^{#}	Opponent^{#}	Result	Record	Site city, state
Exhibition
November 3*		Illinois–Springfield	W 80–53	—	UIC Pavilion; Chicago, IL
Regular season
November 10*; 7:00 pm, ESPN3		at No. 4 Pittsburgh; 2K Sports Classic	L 54–97	0–1	Petersen Events Center; Pittsburgh, PA
November 15*; 7:00 pm		Roosevelt	W 94–54	1–1	UIC Pavilion; Chicago, IL
November 19*; 7:00 pm		at Toledo; 2K Sports Classic	W 57–51	2–1	Savage Arena; Toledo, OH
November 20*; 4:30 pm		vs. College of Charleston; 2K Sports Classic	L 66–78	2–2	Savage Arena; Toledo, OH
November 21*; 12:30 pm		vs. Rhode Island; 2K Sports Classic	W 74–68	3–2	Savage Arena; Toledo, OH
November 24*; 8:00 pm		Central Michigan	L 52–62	3–3	UIC Pavilion; Chicago, IL
November 28*; 4:00 pm		Toledo	W 63–62	4–3	UIC Pavilion; Chicago, IL
December 2; 8:00 pm		Valparaiso	L 66–68 ^{OT}	4–4 (0–1)	UIC Pavilion; Chicago, IL
December 4*; 4:00 pm		Akron	L 52–54	4–5	UIC Pavilion; Chicago, IL
December 11*; 8:05 pm, Comcast SportsNet Chicago		at Illinois State	L 43–53	4–6	Redbird Arena; Normal, IL
December 14*; 8:00 pm		at Northern Illinois	L 78–80	4–7	Convocation Center; DeKalb, IL
December 18*; 2:00 pm, BTN		vs. No. 14 Illinois	W 57–54	5–7	United Center; Chicago, IL
December 22*; 10:00 pm		at Oregon State	L 54–74	5–8	Gill Coliseum; Corvallis, OR
December 30; 7:05 pm		at Youngstown State	L 69–71	5–9 (0–2)	Beeghly Center; Youngstown, OH
January 1; 2:00 pm		at Cleveland State	L 59–83	5–10 (0–3)	Wolstein Center; Cleveland, OH
January 6; 8:00 pm, Comcast SportsNet Chicago		Wright State	L 63–71	5–11 (0–4)	UIC Pavilion; Chicago, IL
January 8; 2:00 pm, Comcast SportsNet Chicago		Detroit	L 69–72	5–12 (0–5)	UIC Pavilion; Chicago, IL
January 13; 8:00 pm		at Milwaukee	L 75–87	5–13 (0–6)	U.S. Cellular Arena; Milwaukee, WI
January 15; 8:00 pm		at Green Bay	L 50–74	5–14 (0–7)	Resch Center; Green Bay, WI
January 22; 4:00 pm		at Loyola Chicago	L 59–68	5–15 (0–8)	Joseph J. Gentile Center; Chicago, IL
January 27; 8:00 pm, Comcast SportsNet Chicago		Cleveland State	L 49–63	5–16 (0–9)	UIC Pavilion; Chicago, IL
January 29; 4:00 pm		Youngstown State	W 83–61	6–16 (1–9)	UIC Pavilion; Chicago, IL
February 3; 7:00 pm		at Detroit	L 63–77	6–17 (1–10)	Calihan Hall; Detroit, MI
February 5; 7:00 pm		at Wright State	L 63–69	6–18 (1–11)	Nutter Center; Dayton, OH
February 7; 7:00 pm, WNDY-23		at Butler	L 65–72	6–19 (1–12)	Hinkle Fieldhouse; Indianapolis, IN
February 10; 8:00 pm		Green Bay	W 63–61 ^{OT}	7–19 (2–12)	UIC Pavilion; Chicago, IL
February 12; 4:00 pm, Comcast SportsNet Chicago		Milwaukee	L 59–70	7–20 (2–13)	UIC Pavilion; Chicago, IL
February 16; 8:00 pm, ESPN3		Loyola Chicago	L 66–67	7–21 (2–14)	UIC Pavilion; Chicago, IL
February 19; 2:00 pm, Comcast SportsNet Chicago		Butler	L 52–79	7–22 (2–15)	UIC Pavilion; Chicago, IL
February 26; 8:05 pm, Comcast SportsNet Chicago		Valparaiso	L 65–79	7–23 (2–16)	Athletics-Recreation Center; Valparaiso, IN
Horizon League tournament
March 1; 7:00 pm, HLN	(10)	at (3) Cleveland State; Horizon First Round	L 61–73	7–24	Wolstein Center; Cleveland, OH
*Non-conference game. ^{#}Rankings from Coaches' Poll. (#) Tournament seedings in parentheses. All times are in Eastern Time..
