= 2010–11 Milwaukee Panthers men's basketball team =

American college basketball season

2010–11 Milwaukee Panthers men's basketball

Horizon League Regular Season Co-Champions

NIT, First Round
- Conference: Horizon League
- Record: 19–14 (13–5 Horizon League)
- Head coach: Rob Jeter (6th season)
- Assistant coaches: Duffy Conroy (7th season); Chad Boudreau (6th season); Brian Bidlingmyer
- Home arena: U.S. Cellular Arena; Klotsche Center

2010–11 Horizon League men's basketball standings
	Conf.				Overall
Team	W		L	PCT	W		L	PCT
*Milwaukee	13	–	5	.722	19	–	14	.576
† Butler	13	–	5	.722	28	–	10	.737
Cleveland State	13	–	5	.722	27	–	9	.750
Valparaiso	12	–	6	.667	23	–	12	.657
Wright State	10	–	8	.556	19	–	14	.576
Detroit	10	–	8	.556	17	–	16	.515
Green Bay	8	–	10	.444	14	–	18	.438
Loyola (IL)	7	–	11	.389	16	–	15	.516
Youngstown State	2	–	16	.111	9	–	21	.300
UIC	2	–	16	.111	7	–	24	.226
† 2011 Horizon League Tournament winner * Tournament #1 seed As of April 4, 2011; Rankings from Coaches Poll

The 2010–11 Milwaukee Panthers men's basketball team represented the University of Wisconsin–Milwaukee during the 2010–11 NCAA Division I men's basketball season. Their head coach was Rob Jeter. They played their home games at US Cellular Arena, along with one game (plus two exhibitions) at the Klotsche Center, and are members of the Horizon League.

They finished the season 19–14, 13–5 in Horizon League play to share the regular season conference title with Butler and Cleveland State. They advanced to the championship game of the 2011 Horizon League men's basketball tournament before losing to Butler. They were invited to the 2011 National Invitation Tournament where they lost in the first round to Northwestern.

== 2010 recruiting class ==
College recruiting
Name	Hometown	School	Height	Weight	Commit date
Evan Richard; Shooting Guard	Cuba City, WI	Cuba City High School	6 ft 3 in (1.91 m)	175 lb (79 kg)	Dec 5, 2009
Evan Richard; Shooting Guard	Recruit ratings: Scout: Rivals: (81)				
Kyle Kelm; Power Forward	Randolph, WI	Randolph High School	6 ft 9 in (2.06 m)	210 lb (95 kg)	Sep 18, 2009
Kyle Kelm; Power Forward	Recruit ratings: Scout: Rivals: (80)				
Kaylon Williams; Shooting Guard	Cedar Rapids, IA	Kirkwood Community College	6 ft 3 in (1.91 m)	185 lb (84 kg)	Sep 18, 2009
Kaylon Williams; Shooting Guard	Recruit ratings: Scout: Rivals: (40)				
Ryan Allen; Shooting Guard	South Holland, IL	Vincennes Community College	6 ft 3 in (1.91 m)	200 lb (91 kg)	May 10, 2010
Ryan Allen; Shooting Guard	Recruit ratings: Scout: Rivals: (40)				
Overall recruit ranking:
Note: In many cases, Scout, Rivals, 247Sports, On3, and ESPN may conflict in their listings of height and weight.; In these cases, the average was taken. ESPN grades are on a 100-point scale.; Sources: "2010 Team Ranking". Rivals.

== Coaching staff ==
Name	Type	College
Rob Jeter	Head coach	University of Wisconsin–Platteville
Brian Bidlingmyer	Assistant coach	Siena College
Chad Boudreau	Assistant coach	Hannibal-LaGrange College
Duffy Conroy	Assistant coach	St. Ambrose University
Ronnie Jones	Director of Basketball Operations	University of Wisconsin–Milwaukee
Chip MacKenzie	Video Coordinator	Edgewood College
Elliott Meyer	Athletic trainer	University of Wisconsin–Milwaukee

== Roster ==
#	Name	Height	Weight (lbs.)	Position	Class	Hometown	Previous Team(s)
1	Ja'Rob McCallum	6'0"	170	G	So.	Marion, IN, U.S.	Marion HS
2	Kaylon Williams	6'3"	185	G	Jr.	Cedar Rapids, IA, U.S.	Kennedy HS
3	Kyle Kelm	6'9"	210	F	Fr.	Randolph, WI, U.S.	Randolph HS
4	Ryan Allen	6'3"	200	G	Jr.	South Holland, IL, U.S.	Thornton HS
11	Tone Boyle	6'3"	185	G	Sr.	Middleton, WI, U.S.	Middleton HS
15	Patrick Souter	6'0"	170	G	So.	Racine, WI, U.S.	St. Catherine's HS
21	Tony Meier	6'8"	210	F	Jr.	Wildwood, MO, U.S.	Lafayette HS
22	Evan Richard	6'2"	175	G	Fr.	Kieler, WI, U.S.	Cuba City HS
23	Anthony Hill	6'7"	230	F	Sr.	Milwaukee, WI, U.S.	Bradley Tech HS
30	Jerard Ajami	6'2"	180	G	Sr.	Madison, WI, U.S.	Madison Memorial HS
32	Lonnie Boga	6'3"	200	G	So.	St. Louis, MO, U.S.	McCluer HS
33	Quinton Gustavson	6'9"	200	F	Fr.	Racine, WI, U.S.	Case HS
34	Mitchell Carter	6'10"	270	C	Sr.	Milwaukee, WI, U.S.	Rufus King HS
41	Nick Olson	6'6"	215	F	Fr.	Milwaukee, WI, U.S.	Wauwatosa West HS
42	James Haarsma	6'7"	230	F	Jr.	Racine, WI, U.S.	St. Catherine's HS
44	Ryan Haggerty	6'8"	210	F	So.	Glen Ellyn, IL, U.S.	Benet Academy
45	Christian Wolf	6'8"	250	F	So.	Kohler, WI, U.S.	Kohler HS

== 2010–11 Schedule and results ==
- All times are Central

Date time, TV	Rank^{#}	Opponent^{#}	Result	Record	Site city, state
Exhibition
11/01/2010*; 7:00 pm		MSOE	W 86–37	—	Klotsche Center; Milwaukee, WI
11/6/2010*; 7:00 pm		Carroll	W 84–59	—	Klotsche Center; Milwaukee, WI
Regular season
11/12/2010*; 3:30 pm		at Portland; Athletes in Action Basketball Classic	L 60–80	0–1	Chiles Center (1,379); Portland, OR
11/13/2010*; 6:30 pm		vs. Florida Atlantic; Athletes in Action Basketball Classic	L 76–85	0–2	Chiles Center (1,855); Portland, OR
11/14/2010*; 5:00 pm		vs. UC Davis; Athletes in Action Basketball Classic	W 73–62	1–2	Chiles Center (1,164); Portland, OR
11/17/2010*; 7:00 pm		at Niagara	W 90–73	2–2	Gallagher Center (2,013); Niagara Falls, NY
11/20/2010*; 7:00 pm, Sports 32		Northern Iowa	L 63–65	3–2	U.S. Cellular Arena (3,752); Milwaukee, WI
11/23/2010*; 7:00 pm		Western Michigan	L 55–67	3–3	Klotsche Center (1,807); Milwaukee, WI
11/27/2010*; 7:00 pm, Sports 32		Marquette	L 72–75	3–4	U.S. Cellular Arena (7,120); Milwaukee, WI
12/02/2010; 7:00 pm, HLN		Youngstown State	W 76–67	4–4 (1–0)	U.S. Cellular Arena (2,533); Milwaukee, WI
12/04/2010; 7:00 pm, Sports 32		Cleveland State	L 59–82	4–5 (1–1)	U.S. Cellular Arena (2,946); Milwaukee, WI
12/08/2010*; 7:30 pm, Big Ten Network		at Wisconsin	L 40–61	4–6	Kohl Center (17,230); Madison, WI
12/11/2010*; 7:00 pm		at South Dakota State	W 82–70	5–6	Frost Arena (1,622); Brookings, SD
12/14/2010*; 8:00 pm, Sports 32		at DePaul	L 47–61	5–7	Allstate Arena (7,612); Rosemont, IL
12/18/2010*; 7:00 pm		Bowling Green	W 72–69	6–7	U.S. Cellular Arena (2,528); Milwaukee, WI
12/30/2010; 6:00 pm, HLN		at Wright State	L 44–68	6–8 (1–2)	Nutter Center (3,678); Dayton, OH
01/01/2011; 12:00 pm, HLN		at Detroit	W 84–81 ^{OT}	7–8 (2–2)	Calihan Hall (1,577); Detroit, MI
01/03/2011; 7:00 pm, ESPN3		Butler	W 76–52	8–8 (3–2)	U.S. Cellular Arena (4,027); Milwaukee, WI
01/08/2011; 7:00 pm, Sports 32		at Green Bay	L 64–69	8–9 (3–3)	Resch Center (4,649); Green Bay, WI
01/13/2011; 7:00 pm, Sports 32		UIC	W 87–75	9–9 (4–3)	U.S. Cellular Arena (2,234); Milwaukee, WI
01/15/2011; 1:00 pm, Sports 32		Loyola Chicago	L 65–71	9–10 (4–4)	U.S. Cellular Arena (3,152); Milwaukee, WI
01/21/2011; 6:00 pm, ESPN3		at Valparaiso	L 43–60	9–11 (4–5)	Athletics–Recreation Center (3,376); Valparaiso, IN
01/23/2011; 1:00 pm, Sports 32/WNDY		at Butler	W 86–80 ^{OT}	10–11 (5–5)	Hinkle Fieldhouse (6,745); Indianapolis, IN
01/28/2011; 8:00 pm, ESPNU		Detroit	W 72–67	11–11 (6–5)	U.S. Cellular Arena (3,072); Milwaukee, WI
01/30/2011; 1:00 pm, Sports 32		Wright State	W 54–53	12–11 (7–5)	U.S. Cellular Arena (3,021); Milwaukee, WI
02/05/2011; 2:00 pm, ESPNU		Green Bay	W 88–75	13–11 (8–5)	U.S. Cellular Arena (4,073); Milwaukee, WI
02/10/2011; 7:00 pm, Sports 32		at Loyola Chicago	W 66–57	14–11 (9–5)	Joseph J. Gentile Center (2,503); Chicago, IL
02/12/2011; 3:00 pm, HLN		at UIC	W 70–59	15–11 (10–5)	UIC Pavilion (3,950); Chicago, IL
02/16/2011; 7:00 pm, Sports 32		Valparaiso	W 79–76	16–11 (11–5)	U.S. Cellular Arena (4,173); Milwaukee, WI
02/19/2011*; 6:00 pm		at Buffalo; ESPN BracketBusters	L 65–80	16–12	Alumni Arena (3,694); Buffalo, NY
02/24/2011; 6:00 pm, Sports 32		at Cleveland State	W 87–83	17–12 (12–5)	Wolstein Center (3,449); Cleveland, OH
02/26/2011; 12:00 pm, HLN		at Youngstown State	W 94–87 ^{OT}	18–12 (13–5)	Beeghly Center (2,763); Youngstown, OH
Horizon League tournament
3/05/2011; 7:30 pm, ESPNU	(1)	(4) Valparaiso; Horizon Semifinals	W 70–63	19–12	U.S. Cellular Arena (7,431); Milwaukee, WI
3/08/2011; 8:00 pm, ESPN	(1)	(2) Butler; Horizon Championship Game	L 44–59	19–13	U.S. Cellular Arena (10,437); Milwaukee, WI
NIT
3/16/2011*; 7:00 pm, ESPN3	(5 BC)	at (4 BC) Northwestern; NIT First Round	L 61–70	19–14	Welsh-Ryan Arena (3,915); Evanston, IL
*Non-conference game. ^{#}Rankings from AP Poll. (#) Tournament seedings in parentheses. BC=NIT Boston College bracket.

== Rankings ==
Ranking movement Legend: ¦¦ Improvement in ranking. ¦¦ Decrease in ranking. RV – Received votes.
Poll	Pre	Wk 1	Wk 2	Wk 3	Wk 4	Wk 5	Wk 6	Wk 7	Wk 8	Wk 9	Wk 10	Wk 11	Wk 12	Wk 13	Wk 14	Wk 15	Wk 16	WK 17	Wk 18	Final
AP	–	–	–	–	–	–	–	–	–	–	–	–	–	–	–	–	–		–	
Coaches	–	–	–	–	–	–	–	–	–	–	–	–	–	–	–	–	–	–	–	–
Mid-Major	RV	–	–	–	–	–	–	–	–	–	–	–	–	–	RV	RV	RV	21	18	20
