= 2010–11 Cleveland State Vikings men's basketball team =

American college basketball season

2010–11 Cleveland State Vikings men's basketball

Horizon League Regular Season Co-Champions

NIT, Second Round
- Conference: Horizon League
- Record: 27–9 (13–5 Horizon)
- Head coach: Gary Waters
- Assistant coaches: Jayson Gee; Larry DeSimpelare; Jermaine Kimbrough
- Home arena: Wolstein Center

2010–11 Horizon League men's basketball standings
	Conf.				Overall
Team	W		L	PCT	W		L	PCT
*Milwaukee	13	–	5	.722	19	–	14	.576
† Butler	13	–	5	.722	28	–	10	.737
Cleveland State	13	–	5	.722	27	–	9	.750
Valparaiso	12	–	6	.667	23	–	12	.657
Wright State	10	–	8	.556	19	–	14	.576
Detroit	10	–	8	.556	17	–	16	.515
Green Bay	8	–	10	.444	14	–	18	.438
Loyola (IL)	7	–	11	.389	16	–	15	.516
Youngstown State	2	–	16	.111	9	–	21	.300
UIC	2	–	16	.111	7	–	24	.226
† 2011 Horizon League Tournament winner * Tournament #1 seed As of April 4, 2011; Rankings from Coaches Poll

The 2010–11 Cleveland State Vikings men's basketball team represented Cleveland State University in the 2010–11 NCAA Division I men's basketball season. Their head coach was Gary Waters. The Vikings played their home games at the Wolstein Center and are members of the Horizon League. It was the 80th season of Cleveland State basketball. They finished the season 27–9, 13–5 in Horizon League play to share the regular season conference title with Butler and Milwaukee. They lost in the semifinals of the 2011 Horizon League men's basketball tournament to Butler. They were invited to the 2011 National Invitation Tournament where they defeated Vermont before falling to the College of Charleston in the second round.

== Preseason ==
The preseason Horizon League Coaches' Poll picked the Vikings to finish third. Norris Cole was named to the preseason all-Horizon League 1st team.

== Regular season ==
On November 29, 2010 Cleveland State received their first point in the AP Top 25 poll for the season, that had them 41st. The lone point came from Steve Deshazo of The Free Lance-Star. The game time of the February 5 game against Butler was changed from 2:00 p.m. to 12:00 p.m. to accommodate a broadcast on ESPN2. The attendance at the Butler @ Cleveland State game on February 5 was 8,490. That is the 6th largest home attendance ever for a Cleveland State basketball game.

== Roster ==
2010–11 Cleveland State Vikings men's basketball team
Players
Coaches

Pos.	#	Name	Height	Weight	Year	Hometown
G	1	Anthony Wells	6 ft 1 in (1.85 m)	180 lb (82 kg)	So	Shaker Heights, OH
G	2	Keith Mackie	5 ft 11 in (1.8 m)	165 lb (75 kg)	Fr	Westland, MI
G	3	Trevon Harmon	6 ft 1 in (1.85 m)	170 lb (77 kg)	Jr	Pasadena, CA
F	4	Devon Long	6 ft 7 in (2.01 m)	260 lb (118 kg)	Fr	Detroit, MI
G	5	Jeremy Montgomery	6 ft 2 in (1.88 m)	190 lb (86 kg)	Jr	Chicago, IL
G	11	Sebastian Douglas	6 ft 4 in (1.93 m)	200 lb (91 kg)	Fr	Houston, TX
G	13	Darius Ware	6 ft 3 in (1.91 m)	195 lb (88 kg)	Fr	Bloomfield Hills, MI
F	20	Charlie Woods	6 ft 7 in (2.01 m)	200 lb (91 kg)	So	Lansing, MI
G	22	Josh McCoy	6 ft 4 in (1.93 m)	180 lb (82 kg)	So	St. Peters, MO
F	24	Ludovic Ndaye	6 ft 9 in (2.06 m)	230 lb (104 kg)	Fr	Montreal, PQ
G	30	Norris Cole	6 ft 2 in (1.88 m)	170 lb (77 kg)	Sr	Dayton, OH
G	32	D'Aundray Brown	6 ft 4 in (1.93 m)	185 lb (84 kg)	Sr	Youngstown, OH
F	33	Tim Kamczyc	6 ft 6 in (1.98 m)	195 lb (88 kg)	So	Strongsville, OH
F	44	Aaron Pogue	6 ft 9 in (2.06 m)	275 lb (125 kg)	Jr	Dayton, OH
C	51	Joe Latas	6 ft 11 in (2.11 m)	280 lb (127 kg)	Jr	Cleveland, OH

Head coach

- Gary Waters (Ferris State)

Assistant coach(es)

- Jayson Gee (College of Charleston)
- Larry DeSimpelare (Spring Arbor)
- Jermaine Kimbrough (Virginia Tech)

Legend

- (C) Team captain
- (S) Suspended
- (I) Ineligible
- (W) Walk-on
- Injured
- Current redshirt

Roster
Last update: 2010-11-11

== Schedule ==
Date time, TV	Rank^{#}	Opponent^{#}	Result	Record	Site (attendance) city, state
Exhibition
November 8*		Baldwin Wallace	W 68–39		Wolstein Center; Cleveland, OH
Regular season
November 12*; 7:30 PM		Bryant; World Vision Basketball Classic	W 71–57	1–0	Wolstein Center (1,450); Cleveland, OH
November 13*; 6:00 PM		Iona; World Vision Basketball Classic	W 78–68	2–0	Wolstein Center (1,561); Cleveland, OH
November 14*; 6:00 PM		Kent State; World Vision Basketball Classic	W 69–66	3–0	Wolstein Center (2,805); Cleveland, OH
November 15*; 7:00 PM		Urbana	W 83–49	4–0	Wolstein Center (1,411); Cleveland, OH
November 19*; 8:05 PM		at Louisiana–Lafayette	W 60–55	5–0	Cajundome (3,689); Lafayette, LA
November 24*; 7:00 PM, STO		at Akron	W 64–51	6–0	James A. Rhodes Arena (2,716); Akron, OH
November 27*; 6:00 PM		St. Bonaventure	W 69–51	7–0	Wolstein Center (2,214); Cleveland, OH
November 29*; 6:00 PM		Robert Morris	W 58–53	8–0	Wolstein Center (1,841); Cleveland, OH
December 2; 8:00 PM		at Green Bay	W 83–75	9–0 (1–0)	Resch Center (2,305); Green Bay, WI
December 4; 8:00 PM		at Milwaukee	W 82–59	10–0 (2–0)	U.S. Cellular Arena (2,946); Milwaukee, WI
December 7*; 7:00 PM		West Virginia Tech	W 94–62	11–0	Wolstein Center (2,011); Cleveland, OH
December 11*; 4:30 PM		at Sam Houston State	W 74–62	12–0	Bernard Johnson Coliseum (1,195); Huntsville, TX
December 18*; 2:00 PM, ESPN3		at West Virginia	L 63–74	12–1	WVU Coliseum (11,235); Morgantown, WV
December 22*; 7:00 PM		South Florida	W 69–62	13–1	Wolstein Center (4,711); Cleveland, OH
December 30; 7:00 PM		Loyola Chicago	W 73–55	14–1 (3–0)	Wolstein Center (4,044); Cleveland, OH
January 1; 2:00 PM		UIC	W 83–59	15–1 (4–0)	Wolstein Center (2,142); Cleveland, OH
January 7; 7:00 PM, ESPNU		at Butler	L 56–79	15–2 (4–1)	Hinkle Fieldhouse (7,071); Indianapolis, IN
January 9; 2:35 PM		at Valparaiso	L 58–64	15–3 (4–2)	Athletics-Recreation Center (3,776); Valparaiso, IN
January 15; 7:05 PM		at Youngstown State	W 61–51	16–3 (5–2)	Beeghly Center (4,302); Youngstown, OH
January 20; 7:30 PM		Detroit	W 81–69	17–3 (6–2)	Wolstein Center (3,518); Cleveland, OH
January 22; 2:00 PM		Wright State	W 65–46	18–3 (7–2)	Wolstein Center (4,615); Cleveland, OH
January 27; 8:00 PM		at UIC	W 63–49	19–3 (8–2)	UIC Pavilion (3,197); Chicago, IL
January 29; 4:00 PM		at Loyola Chicago	W 81–70	20–3 (9–2)	Joseph J. Gentile Center (3,127); Chicago, IL
February 3; 7:00 PM		Valparaiso	W 76–65	21–3 (10–2)	Wolstein Center (4,472); Cleveland, OH
February 5; 12:00 PM, ESPN2		Butler	L 61–73	21–4 (10–3)	Wolstein Center (8,590); Cleveland, OH
February 7; 7:00 PM		at Detroit	L 78–81	21–5 (10–4)	Calihan Hall (2,356); Detroit, MI
February 12; 2:00 PM		Youngstown State	W 86–76	22–5 (11–4)	Wolstein Center (3,875); Cleveland, OH
February 16; 7:00 PM		at Wright State	W 74–72	23–5 (12–4)	Nutter Center (5,768); Dayton, OH
February 20*; 1:00 PM, ESPN 2		at Old Dominion; ESPNU Bracketbusters	L 63–74	23–6 (12–4)	Ted Constant Convocation Center (8,328); Norfolk, VA
February 24; 7:00 PM		Milwaukee	L 83–87	23–7 (12–5)	Wolstein Center (3,449); Cleveland, OH
February 26; 2:00 PM		Green Bay	W 64–57	24–7 (13–5)	Wolstein Center (4,923); Cleveland, OH
Horizon League tournament
March 1; 7:00 PM, HLN	(3)	(10) UIC; First Round	W 73–61	25–7	Wolstein Center (1,161); Cleveland, OH
March 4; 6:00 PM, ESPN3	(3)	vs. (6) Wright State; Quarterfinals	W 73–59	26–7	U.S. Cellular Arena (-); Milwaukee, WI
March 5; 6:00 PM, ESPNU	(3)	vs. (2) Butler; Semifinals	L 68–76	26–8	U.S. Cellular Arena (-); Milwaukee, WI
2011 National Invitation Tournament
March 15*; 7:00 PM, ESPN3	(2 VT)	(7 VT) Vermont; First Round	W 63–60	27–8	Wolstein Center (1,472); Cleveland, OH
March 19*; 2:00 PM, ESPNU	(2 VT)	(6 VT) College of Charleston; Second Round	L 56–64	27–9	Wolstein Center (2,077); Cleveland, OH
*Non-conference game. ^{#}Rankings from AP Poll. (#) Tournament seedings in parentheses. VT=NIT Virginia Tech Bracket. All times are in Eastern Time.

== Rankings ==
Ranking movement Legend: ██ Improvement in ranking. ██ Decrease in ranking. ██ Not ranked the previous week. rv=Others receiving votes.
Poll	Pre	Wk 1	Wk 2	Wk 3	Wk 4	Wk 5	Wk 6	Wk 7	Wk 8	Wk 9	Wk 10	Wk 11	Wk 12	Wk 13	Wk 14	Wk 15	Wk 16	Wk 17	Wk 18	Final
AP	NR	NR	NR	RV	RV	RV	RV	RV	RV	NR	NR	NR	RV	RV						
Coaches	NR	NR	NR	NR	RV	RV	NR	NR	RV	NR	NR	RV	RV	NR						
Mid-Major	25	16	7	5	1	1	1	1	1	7	7	2	1	6	9	10	10	11	11	12
