= 2010–11 Youngstown State Penguins men's basketball team =

American college basketball season

2010–11 Youngstown State Penguins men's basketball
- Conference: Horizon League
- Record: 9–21 (2–16 Horizon)
- Head coach: Jerry Slocum
- Assistant coaches: Michael Wernicki; Brian DePaoli; Byron Thorne
- Home arena: Beeghly Center

2010–11 Horizon League men's basketball standings
	Conf.				Overall
Team	W		L	PCT	W		L	PCT
*Milwaukee	13	–	5	.722	19	–	14	.576
† Butler	13	–	5	.722	28	–	10	.737
Cleveland State	13	–	5	.722	27	–	9	.750
Valparaiso	12	–	6	.667	23	–	12	.657
Wright State	10	–	8	.556	19	–	14	.576
Detroit	10	–	8	.556	17	–	16	.515
Green Bay	8	–	10	.444	14	–	18	.438
Loyola (IL)	7	–	11	.389	16	–	15	.516
Youngstown State	2	–	16	.111	9	–	21	.300
UIC	2	–	16	.111	7	–	24	.226
† 2011 Horizon League Tournament winner * Tournament #1 seed As of April 4, 2011; Rankings from Coaches Poll

The 2010–11 Youngstown State Penguins men's basketball team represented Youngstown State University in the 2010–11 NCAA Division I men's basketball season. Their head coach was Jerry Slocum. The Penguins played their home games at the Beeghly Center and were members of the Horizon League. They finished the season 9–21, 2–16 in Horizon League play. The Penguins lost in the first round of the 2011 Horizon League men's basketball tournament to Valparaiso.

== Roster ==
2010–11 Youngstown State Penguins men's basketball team
Players
Coaches

Pos.	#	Name	Height	Weight	Year	Hometown
G	1	Blake Allen	6 ft 1 in (1.85 m)	180 lb (82 kg)	So	Tampa, FL
G	3	Kendrick Perry	6 ft 0 in (1.83 m)	160 lb (73 kg)	Fr	Ocoee, FL
G	4	Shawn Amiker, Jr.	6 ft 4 in (1.93 m)	175 lb (79 kg)	Fr	Oak Park, MI
G	5	Nate Perry	6 ft 2 in (1.88 m)	180 lb (82 kg)	Fr	Greensburg, PA
F	14	Josh Chojnacki	6 ft 9 in (2.06 m)	220 lb (100 kg)	Fr	Erie, PA
G	20	Ashen Ward	6 ft 3 in (1.91 m)	225 lb (102 kg)	Jr	Cleveland, OH
F	21	Damian Eargle	6 ft 7 in (2.01 m)	215 lb (98 kg)	So	Warren, OH
G	22	Devonte Maymon	6 ft 2 in (1.88 m)	180 lb (82 kg)	Jr	Middleton, WI
F	23	DuShawn Brooks	6 ft 6 in (1.98 m)	215 lb (98 kg)	Jr	Chicago, IL
G	24	Sheldon Brogdon	6 ft 0 in (1.83 m)	170 lb (77 kg)	Fr	Warren, OH
F	25	Fletcher Larson	6 ft 8 in (2.03 m)	215 lb (98 kg)	Fr	Lakewood, NY
G	32	Tre Brewer	6 ft 5 in (1.96 m)	200 lb (91 kg)	Jr	Alto Loma, CA
F	33	Dan Boudler	6 ft 8 in (2.03 m)	240 lb (109 kg)	Sr	Louisville, OH
G	34	Mike Podolsky	6 ft 1 in (1.85 m)	210 lb (95 kg)	Fr	Canfield, OH
G	44	Vytas Sulskis	6 ft 7 in (2.01 m)	200 lb (91 kg)	Sr	Vilnius, LT

Head coach

- Jerry Slocum (King's (NY))

Assistant coach(es)

- Michael Wernicki (Pittsburgh)
- Brian DePaoli (Clarion)
- Byron Thorne (Penn State Behrend)

Legend

- (C) Team captain
- (S) Suspended
- (I) Ineligible
- (W) Walk-on
- Injured
- Current redshirt

Roster
Last update: 2010-11-12

== Schedule ==
Date time, TV	Rank^{#}	Opponent^{#}	Result	Record	Site city, state
Regular season
November 12*; 7:05 pm		Samford	W 64–61	1–0	Beeghly Center (1,729); Youngstown, OH
November 16*; 7:00 pm		Buffalo	L 53–64	2–0	Beeghly Center (1,561); Youngstown, OH
November 20*; 7:00 pm		at Akron	L 84–91 ^{OT}	2–1	James A. Rhodes Arena (2,527); Akron, OH
November 24*; 7:35 pm		Toledo	W 73–67	3–1	Beeghly Center (2,277); Youngstown, OH
November 27*; 7:05 pm		Saint Francis (PA)	W 91–63	4–1	Beeghly Center (2,502); Youngstown, OH
December 2; 8:00 pm		at Milwaukee	L 67–76	4–2 (0–1)	U.S. Cellular Arena (2,533); Milwaukee, WI
December 4; 2:00 pm		at Green Bay	L 59–74	4–3 (0–2)	Resch Center (2,612); Green Bay, WI
December 11*; 7:00 pm		at Robert Morris	L 60–90	4–4	Charles L. Sewall Center (1,242); Moon Township, PA
December 13*; 7:05 pm		Malone	W 78–62	5–4	Beeghly Center (1,202); Youngstown, OH
December 16*; 7:00 pm		at NC State	L 50–67	5–5	RBC Center (9,071); Raleigh, NC
December 21*; 7:00 pm		at Kent State	L 58–71	5–6	MAC Center (3,450); Kent, OH
December 30; 7:05 pm		UIC	W 71–69	6–6 (1–2)	Beeghly Center (1,518); Youngstown, OH
January 1; 1:05 pm		Loyola Chicago	L 53–83	6–7 (1–3)	Beeghly Center (1,415); Youngstown, OH
January 7; 7:00 pm, ESPN3		at Valparaiso	L 55–79	6–8 (1–4)	Athletics–Recreation Center (2,848); Valparaiso, IN
January 9; 2:00 pm, WNDY		at Butler	L 79–84	6–9 (1–5)	Hinkle Fieldhouse (5,789); Indianapolis, IN
January 11*; 7:05 pm		Wilberforce	W 86–51	7–9	Beeghly Center (1,087); Youngstown, OH
January 15; 7:05 pm		Cleveland State	L 51–61	7–10 (1–6)	Beeghly Center (4,302); Youngstown, OH
January 20; 7:35 pm		Wright State	L 62–66	7–11 (1–7)	Beeghly Center (1,585); Youngstown, OH
January 22; 7:05 pm		Detroit	L 69–73	7–12 (1–8)	Beeghly Center (4,803); Youngstown, OH
January 27; 8:00 pm		at Loyola Chicago	L 71–84	7–13 (1–9)	Joseph J. Gentile Center (2,211); Chicago, IL
January 29; 4:00 pm		at UIC	L 61–83	7–14 (1–10)	UIC Pavilion (3,326); Chicago, IL
February 3; 7:05 pm		Butler	W 62–60	8–14 (2–10)	Beeghly Center (3,047); Youngstown, OH
February 5; 7:05 pm		Valparaiso	L 78–86 ^{OT}	8–15 (2–11)	Beeghly Center (2,206); Youngstown, OH
February 7; 7:00 pm		at Wright State	L 70–74	8–16 (2–12)	Nutter Center (3,361); Dayton, OH
February 12; 2:00 pm		at Cleveland State	L 76–86	8–17 (2–13)	Wolstein Center (3,875); Cleveland, OH
February 16; 7:00 pm		at Detroit	L 79–91	8–18 (2–14)	Calihan Hall (1,985); Detroit, MI
February 19*; 7:05 pm		Bowling Green; ESPN BracketBusters	W 83–76	9–18	Beeghly Center (2,729); Youngstown, OH
February 24; 7:05 pm		Green Bay	L 60–71	9–19 (2–15)	Beeghly Center (1,445); Youngstown, OH
February 26; 1:05 pm		Milwaukee	L 87–94 ^{OT}	9–20 (2–16)	Beeghly Center (2,763); Youngstown, OH
Horizon League tournament
March 1; 8:00 pm, HLN	(9)	at (4) Valparaiso; Horizon First Round	L 71–80	9–21	Athletics-Recreation Center (1,201); Valparaiso, IN
*Non-conference game. ^{#}Rankings from Coaches' Poll. (#) Tournament seedings in parentheses. All times are in Eastern Time.
