= 2010–11 Green Bay Phoenix men's basketball team =

American college basketball season

2010–11 Green Bay Phoenix men's basketball
- Conference: Horizon League
- Record: 14–18 (8–10 Horizon)
- Head coach: Brian Wardle
- Assistant coaches: Brian Barone; Chrys Cornelius; Jimmie Foster
- Home arena: Resch Center

2010–11 Horizon League men's basketball standings
	Conf.				Overall
Team	W		L	PCT	W		L	PCT
*Milwaukee	13	–	5	.722	19	–	14	.576
† Butler	13	–	5	.722	28	–	10	.737
Cleveland State	13	–	5	.722	27	–	9	.750
Valparaiso	12	–	6	.667	23	–	12	.657
Wright State	10	–	8	.556	19	–	14	.576
Detroit	10	–	8	.556	17	–	16	.515
Green Bay	8	–	10	.444	14	–	18	.438
Loyola (IL)	7	–	11	.389	16	–	15	.516
Youngstown State	2	–	16	.111	9	–	21	.300
UIC	2	–	16	.111	7	–	24	.226
† 2011 Horizon League Tournament winner * Tournament #1 seed As of April 4, 2011; Rankings from Coaches Poll

The 2010–11 Green Bay Phoenix men's basketball team represented the University of Wisconsin–Green Bay in the 2010–11 NCAA Division I men's basketball season. Their head coach was Brian Wardle. The Phoenix played their home games at the Resch Center and were members of the Horizon League. They finished the season 14–18, 8–10 in Horizon League play and lost in the first round of the 2011 Horizon League men's basketball tournament to Wright State.

== 2010 recruiting class ==
College recruiting information
Name	Hometown	School	Height	Weight	Commit date
Alec Brown; Center	Winona, MN	Winona H.S.	7 ft 0 in (2.13 m)	205 lb (93 kg)	
Alec Brown; Center	Recruit ratings: Scout: Rivals: (89)				
Kameron Cerroni; Shooting Guard	Sussex, WI	Hamilton H.S.	6 ft 2 in (1.88 m)	185 lb (84 kg)	
Kameron Cerroni; Shooting Guard	Recruit ratings: Scout: Rivals: (82)				
Daniel Turner; Small Forward	McCordsville, IN	Mount Vernon H.S.	6 ft 6 in (1.98 m)	200 lb (91 kg)	
Daniel Turner; Small Forward	Recruit ratings: Scout: Rivals: (81)				
Steven Baker; Shooting Guard	West Burlington, IA	Southeastern C.C.	6 ft 2 in (1.88 m)	190 lb (86 kg)	
Steven Baker; Shooting Guard	Recruit ratings: Scout: Rivals: (40)				
Jarvis Williams; Power Forward	Milwaukee, WI	Kirkwood C.C.	6 ft 5 in (1.96 m)	N/A	
Jarvis Williams; Power Forward	Recruit ratings: Scout: Rivals: (40)				
Overall recruit ranking:
Note: In many cases, Scout, Rivals, 247Sports, On3, and ESPN may conflict in their listings of height and weight.; In these cases, the average was taken. ESPN grades are on a 100-point scale.; Sources: "ESPN – Green Bay Phoenix Basketball Recruiting 2010". ESPN.; "2010 Team Ranking". Rivals.

== Roster ==
2010–11 Green Bay Phoenix men's basketball team
Players
Coaches

Pos.	#	Name	Height	Weight	Year	Hometown
G	0	Bryquis Perine	6 ft 3 in (1.91 m)	180 lb (82 kg)	Sr	Milwaukee, WI
G	1	Eric Valentin	5 ft 4 in (1.63 m)	143 lb (65 kg)	Jr	Oviedo, FL
G	2	Terry Johnson	6 ft 0 in (1.83 m)	180 lb (82 kg)	So	Chicago, IL
G	3	Derek Semenas	6 ft 3 in (1.91 m)	175 lb (79 kg)	Fr	Rosendale, WI
G	4	Steve Baker	6 ft 2 in (1.88 m)	190 lb (86 kg)	Jr	St. Paul, MN
F	11	Jarvis Williams	6 ft 5 in (1.96 m)	190 lb (86 kg)	So	Milwaukee, WI
F	12	Troy Snyder	6 ft 5 in (1.96 m)	205 lb (93 kg)	So	Bolingbrook, IL
G	13	Kam Cerroni	6 ft 2 in (1.88 m)	185 lb (84 kg)	Fr	Sussex, WI
G	20	Rahmon Fletcher	5 ft 10 in (1.78 m)	165 lb (75 kg)	Sr	Kansas City, MO
C	21	Alec Brown	7 ft 0 in (2.13 m)	205 lb (93 kg)	Fr	Winona, MN
F	22	Daniel Turner	6 ft 6 in (1.98 m)	200 lb (91 kg)	Fr	McCordsville, IN
G	31	Seth Evans	6 ft 0 in (1.83 m)	180 lb (82 kg)	So	Seneca, IL
F	44	Greg LeSage	6 ft 8 in (2.03 m)	225 lb (102 kg)	Sr	Radcliff, KY
F	55	Clayton Heuer	6 ft 9 in (2.06 m)	225 lb (102 kg)	Fr	Wisconsin Rapids, WI

Head coach

- Brian Wardle (Marquette)

Assistant coach(es)

- Brian Barone (Marquette)
- Jimmie Foster (South Dakota)
- Chrys Cornelius (Western Illinois)

Legend

- (C) Team captain
- (S) Suspended
- (I) Ineligible
- (W) Walk-on
- Injured
- Current redshirt

Roster
Last update: 2010-11-12

== Schedule ==
Date time, TV	Rank^{#}	Opponent^{#}	Result	Record	Site (attendance) city, state
Exhibition
November 8*; 7:00 pm		Edgewood	W 78–55		Resch Center; Green Bay, WI
Regular season
November 13*; 3:00 pm		Minnesota Duluth	W 75–36	1–0	Kress Events Center (2,489); Green Bay, WI
November 17*; 9:00 pm, ESPN3		at Marquette; O'Reilly Auto Parts CBE Classic	L 69–89	1–1	Bradley Center (13,968); Milwaukee, WI
November 20*; 5:30 pm		vs. San Diego State; O'Reilly Auto Parts CBE Classic	L 70–79	1–2	Millett Hall (2,117); Oxford, OH
November 21*; 8:00 pm		at Miami (OH); O'Reilly Auto Parts CBE Classic	W 69–65	2–2	Millett Hall (1,863); Oxford, OH
November 22*; 4:30 pm		vs. IUPUI; O'Reilly Auto Parts CBE Classic	W 63–46	2–3	Millett Hall (1,858); Oxford, OH
November 27*; 8:00 pm		North Dakota State	W 71–69	3–3	Resch Center (2,523); Green Bay, WI
December 2; 8:00 pm		Cleveland State	L 75–83	3–4 (0–1)	Resch Center (2,305); Green Bay, WI
December 4; 2:00 pm		Youngstown State	W 74–59	4–4 (1–1)	Resch Center (2,612); Green Bay, WI
December 8*; 8:05 pm		Duquesne	L 71–81	4–5	Resch Center (2,303); Green Bay, WI
December 11*; 2:00 pm		at Buffalo	L 64–78	4–6	Alumni Arena (1,161); Buffalo, NY
December 13*; 8:00 pm		at Wisconsin	L 56–70	4–7	Kohl Center (17,230); Madison, WI
December 20*; 8:00 pm		North Dakota	W 72–68	5–7	Resch Center (1,934); Green Bay, WI
December 22*; 9:00 pm		at Wyoming	W 68–62	6–7	Arena-Auditorium (3,806); Laramie, WY
December 30; 7:00 pm		at Detroit	L 56–79	6–8 (1–2)	Calihan Hall (2,684); Detroit, MI
January 1; 1:00 pm		at Wright State	L 64–67	6–9 (1–3)	Nutter Center (3,260); Dayton, OH
January 3*; 8:00 pm		Houston Baptist	W 77–61	7–9	Resch Center (1,909); Green Bay, WI
January 8; 8:00 pm		Milwaukee	W 69–64	8–9 (2–3)	Resch Center (4,649); Green Bay, WI
January 13; 8:00 pm		Loyola Chicago	W 71–68	9–9 (3–3)	Resch Center (2,821); Green Bay, WI
January 15; 8:00 pm		UIC	W 74–50	10–9 (4–3)	Resch Center (2,803); Green Bay, WI
January 21; 7:00 pm, ESPNU		at Butler	L 75–81	10–10 (4–4)	Hinkle Fieldhouse (7,666); Indianapolis, IN
January 23; 2:35 pm		at Valparaiso	W 63–61	11–10 (5–4)	Athletics–Recreation Center (2,953); Valparaiso, IN
January 28; 8:00 pm, ESPN3		Wright State	L 61–63	11–11 (5–5)	Resch Center (3,547); Green Bay, WI
January 30; 2:00 pm		Detroit	W 85–74	12–11 (6–5)	Resch Center (3,629); Green Bay, WI
February 5; 2:00 pm		at Milwaukee	L 75–88	12–12 (6–6)	U.S. Cellular Arena (4,073); Milwaukee, WI
February 10; 8:00 pm		at UIC	L 61–63 ^{OT}	12–13 (6–7)	UIC Pavilion (3,006); Chicago, IL
February 12; 4:00 pm		at Loyola Chicago	L 62–79	12–14 (6–8)	Joseph J. Gentile Center (2,723); Chicago, IL
February 15; 8:00 pm, ESPN3		Butler	L 62–64	12–15 (6–9)	Resch Center (5,031); Green Bay, WI
February 19*; 3:05 pm		at Southern Illinois; ESPN BracketBusters	L 60–61	12–16	SIU Arena (4,081); Carbondale, IL
February 21; 8:00 pm		Valparaiso	W 81–80 ^{OT}	13–16 (7–9)	Resch Center (3,548); Green Bay, WI
February 24; 7:05 pm		at Youngstown State	W 71–60	14–16 (8–9)	Beeghly Center (1,445); Youngstown, OH
February 26; 2:00 pm		at Cleveland State	L 57–64	14–17 (8–10)	Wolstein Center (4,923); Cleveland, OH
Horizon League tournament
March 1; 7:00 pm, HLN	(7)	at (6) Wright State; First Round	L 50–60	14–18	Nutter Center (2,441); Dayton, OH
*Non-conference game. ^{#}Rankings from Coaches' Poll. (#) Tournament seedings in parentheses. All times are in Eastern Time..
