= Eli Holman =

American basketball player (born 1989)

No. 15 – Mahram Tehran
- Position: Power forward / Center
- League: IBSL

Personal information
- Born: March 22, 1989 (age 37) San Francisco, California, U.S.
- Listed height: 6 ft 10 in (2.08 m)
- Listed weight: 260 lb (118 kg)

Career information
- High school: Richmond (Richmond, California)
- College: Indiana (2007–2008); Detroit Mercy (2009–2012)
- NBA draft: 2012: undrafted
- Playing career: 2012–present

Career history
- 2012–2013: Hapoel Eilat
- 2013–2014: Uşak Sportif
- 2014–2017: Zhejiang Lions
- 2015: Sporting Al Riyadi Beirut
- 2016: Hapoel Jerusalem
- 2017–2018: Tianjin Gold Lions
- 2019: Capitanes de Arecibo
- 2019: Anhui Oriental Dragons
- 2019–2020: Jilin Northeast Tigers
- 2021: Mahram Tehran
- 2023: Libertadores de Querétaro
- 2023: Cariduros de Fajardo
- 2024: Homenetmen Beirut
- 2024–present: Mahram Tehran

Career highlights
- Lebanese league champion (2015); Second-team All-Lebanese League (2015); Horizon League Sixth Man of the Year (2012); Second-team All-Horizon League (2011); Horizon League All-Defensive Team (2011); No. 32 retired by Detroit Mercy Titans

Elijah Lee Holman (born March 22, 1989) is an American professional basketball player for Mahram Tehran of the Iranian Basketball Super League (IBSL). After a brief appearance in the 2012 NBA Summer League he signed with Israeli team Hapoel Eilat, where he started his professional career. He has appeared in the NBA Summer League in 2013 and 2014, but never signed for an NBA team. Holman has played in Israel, Turkey, Lebanon, Puerto Rico, China, and Iran throughout his career.

After playing at Richmond High School in California, Holman signed for the Indiana Hoosiers, and played one year of college basketball before transferring to Detroit Mercy for his sophomore year. After his senior season at Detroit Mercy he went undrafted in the 2012 NBA draft.

== High school career ==
Holman was born in San Francisco, California, and attended Richmond High School in nearby Richmond. In his sophomore year at Richmond, Holman averaged a triple double, posting 10 points, 15 rebounds and 10 blocks per game. During his junior year of high school, Holman was suspended for 14 months for shoving a referee during a December 2005 game. In July 2006, the summer leading to his senior year, Holman was invited to participate in the ABCD Camp, a camp for the best high school players in the United States.

Holman was reinstated to play in 2007, and he played the final part of his senior season, averaging 27.4 points, 12 rebounds, 5 assists and 10 blocks per game. Holman was listed as a top 100 player in the nation by several recruiting services. 247Sports listed him as the 78th best player, and the 8th best center of his class; Rivals.com listed him as the 85th best player overall; and he was ranked 90th according to the Recruiting Services Consensus Index (RSCI).

== College career ==
=== Indiana ===
Holman committed to Indiana in September 2006 and signed on February 7, 2007. During the 2007–08 NCAA Division I season Holman found limited playing time under coach Kelvin Sampson, and he had his best performance with the Hoosiers on November 18, 2007, when he scored 4 points and posted 6 rebounds against Longwood. After 6 games with Indiana (1 point and 1.7 rebounds per game in 7.5 minutes of playing time) he injured his wrist, and missed the rest of the season.

=== Detroit Mercy ===
Holman decided to declare himself available for transfer, and considered the University of San Francisco, California and San Jose State in his home state of California as possible destinations before choosing to play for Detroit Mercy where he followed Ray McCallum, a former assistant coach at Indiana who had been hired as the new head coach at Detroit Mercy. As a result, Holman missed the 2008–09 season due to NCAA transfer rules.

Holman debuted with the Titans on November 11, 2009, against the nationally ranked California Golden Bears, posting 15 points and 7 rebounds. On November 23, 2009, Holman was named Horizon League Player of the Week. On January 14, 2010, Holman grabbed 18 rebounds against Milwaukee, which was the 8th best rebounding performance in the NCAA season. He scored a season-high 21 points against Valparaiso during the 2010 Horizon League tournament on March 2, 2010; he also posted 15 rebounds in that game. He led the Horizon League in blocks per game with 2.5, and ranked third on his team in scoring with 11.8 points per game. His field goal percentage of 61.4% ranked third all-time in the history of Detroit Mercy basketball. At the end of the season, Holman was named in the Horizon League All-Newcomer team.

Before the start of his junior season, Holman was named a Preseason All-Horizon Second Team selection. He 25 out of 32 total games, with a career-high averages of 28.6 minutes and 9.5 rebounds per game. On November 26, 2010, Holman scored a career-high 27 points (along with 15 rebounds) against Albany in a double-overtime win. On January 28, 2011, he had 5 blocks against Milwaukee. At the end of the season he had totalled 13 double doubles, and was the leading rebounder of the Horizon League; he was named in the All-Horizon League Second Team and was selected in the All-Defensive team.

Before the 2011–12 season, Holman was a preseason All-Horizon League First Team selection; however, he lost his starting role for his senior season, and started only 2 of his 26 games. Coach McCallum used him as a sixth man, and he played 23.3 minutes per game coming off the bench. He scored a season-high 21 points against Western Michigan on December 8, 2011. In the NCAA tournament game against Kansas, Holman posted a double double with 10 points and 11 rebounds in 25 minutes of play. At the end of the season, Holman was named Horizon League Sixth Man of the Year.

=== College statistics ===
Year	Team	GP	GS	MPG	FG%	3P%	FT%	RPG	APG	SPG	BPG	PPG
2007–08	Indiana	6	0	7.5	.250	.000	.500	1.7	0.2	0.2	0.5	1.0
2008–09	Detroit Mercy	Did not play – transfer										
2009–10	Detroit Mercy	31	31	28.0	.614	.000	.633	8.9	0.7	0.5	2.5	11.8
2010–11	Detroit Mercy	32	25	28.6	.607	.000	.694	9.5	0.8	0.9	1.6	11.8
2011–12	Detroit Mercy	26	2	23.3	.607	.000	.595	7.0	0.7	0.7	1.3	10.8
Career		95	58	25.6	.605	.000	.646	8.1	0.7	0.7	1.7	10.8

== Professional career ==
After his senior season with the Titans, Holman was automatically eligible for the 2012 NBA draft, where he went undrafted. Holman was part of the roster of the Houston Rockets for the 2012 NBA Summer League in Las Vegas. After the end of the Summer League Holman was not signed by the Rockets, and he decided to move to Israel, signing for Hapoel Eilat of the Basketball Super League. During the 2012–13 season, his first as a professional, Holman averaged 13 points and 10 rebounds per game (2nd in the league in rebounding, tied with Jumaine Jones and behind Frank Hassell) over 26 appearances. He also played 10 playoff games that season, averaging 12.4 points and 7.7 rebounds per game.

In the summer of 2013 Holman again took part in the NBA Summer League: during the 2013 edition he played with the Boston Celtics, playing 4 games during the Orlando Summer League with averages of 3.5 points and 4.3 rebounds. He then signed with Uşak Sportif of the Turkish Basketball League and played the full season with the team, averaging 13.4 points, 9.5 rebounds and 1.1 assists in 28 games; he also appeared in 2 playoff games, where he scored 15 points per game in the series against Fenerbahçe.

In 2014 he participated in two tournaments during the 2014 NBA Summer League: he played the Orlando league with the Miami Heat (4 games with 5 points and 4.3 rebounds per game) and he played in Las Vegas with the Toronto Raptors (4 appearances with averages of 3 points and 3 rebounds). He then joined a Chinese team for the first time in his career, signing a contract with the Zhejiang Lions, and he debuted in the Chinese Basketball Association (CBA): in his first season he averaged 22.9 points, 14.4 rebounds and 1.8 blocks per game while shooting 67.9% from the field. His team qualified for the playoffs, and Holman posted averages of 22.7 points and 15.3 rebounds during the 2015 CBA Playoffs, including a 29-point performance on February 9, 2015; his team was eliminated by the Liaoning Flying Leopards. He then moved to Lebanon and played in the Lebanese Basketball League, earning an All-League Second Team selection with Sporting Al Riyadi Beirut.

He went back to the Zhejiang Lions for the 2015–16 CBA season, and he posted new career-highs with 23.5 points and 15.4 rebounds per game over 37 regular season games: in the 2016 CBA Playoffs Holman recorded 27 points and 9.3 rebounds per game, and his team was eliminated by the Sichuan Blue Whales (2–1 for the series). In March 2016 Holman signed for Hapoel Jerusalem, and he played in 9 regular season games and 7 playoff games, averaging 11.6 points and 5.1 rebounds in postseason play. He took part in the 2016 Israeli Basketball Super League Final Four, and played in the final game, scoring 8 points and grabbing a team-high 7 rebounds.

Holman returned to the Zhejiang Bulls for his third season with the club: he received less playing time, and in 27.2 minutes per game he averaged 17.5 points and 9.7 rebounds (his only season with less than 10 rebounds per game in the CBA). He participated in the 2017 CBA Playoffs, his third consecutive playoff appearance, and in 4 games he posted averages of 13.8 points and 5 rebounds per game.

In July 2017 he left the Bulls for the Tianjin Gold Lions, and played in 17 games during the 2017–18 CBA season: he started all the games and averaged a career-high 26.7 points per game, along with 14.7 rebounds in 34.5 minutes per game. He then left the team in September 2018. In 2019 Holman participated in the 2019 FIBA Americas League with Puerto Rican team Capitanes de Arecibo. He then joined Anhui Dragons of the National Basketball League, the second tier of Chinese basketball, in March 2019.

In October 2019, Holman signed a contract with the Jilin Northeast Tigers of the CBA, returning to the Chinese top league. He averaged 15.3 points and 10 rebounds per game in the 2019–20 season before the league was suspended due to the COVID-19 pandemic in mainland China.
