= Jason Calliste =

Canadian basketball player (born 1990)

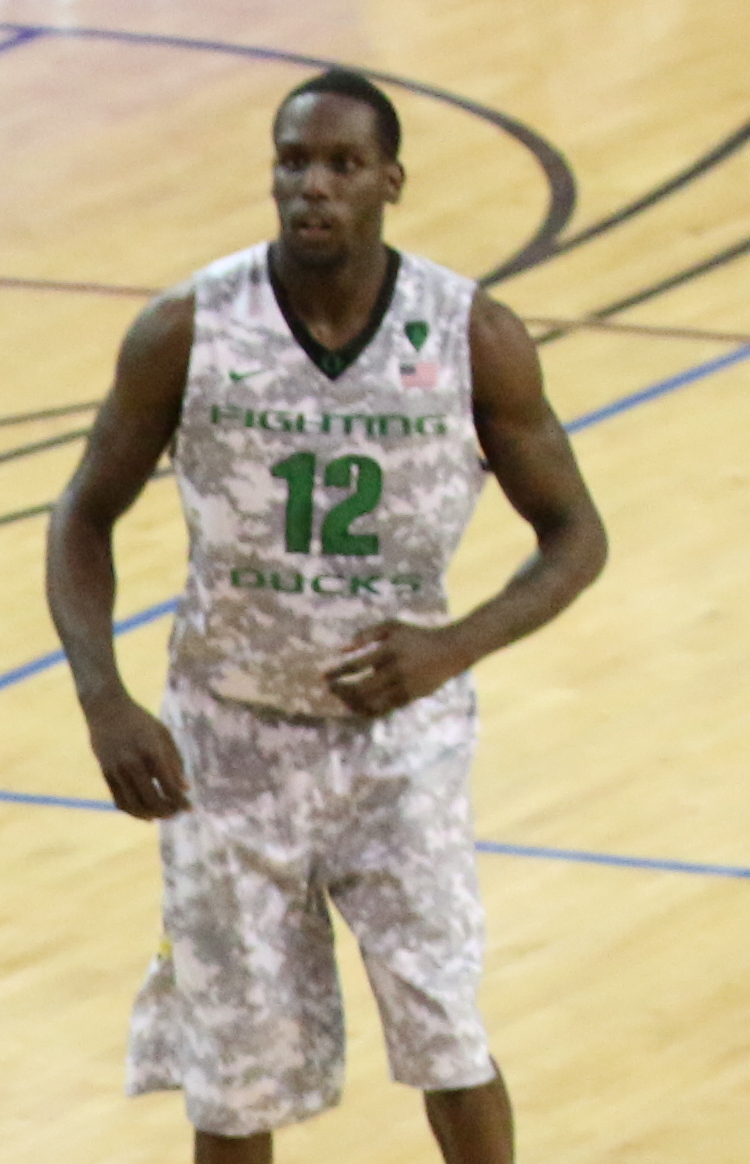
- Calliste playing for Oregon

Personal information
- Born: January 27, 1990 (age 36) Scarborough, Ontario, Canada
- Listed height: 6 ft 2 in (1.88 m)
- Listed weight: 175 lb (79 kg)

Career information
- High school: Quality Education Academy (Winston-Salem, North Carolina)
- College: Detroit Mercy (2009–2013); Oregon (2013–2014)
- NBA draft: 2014: undrafted
- Playing career: 2014–present
- Position: Point guard
- Number: 2

Career history
- 2014–2015: Maine Red Claws
- 2015–2016: BK Barons
- 2016–2017: Maine Red Claws
- 2017: KW Titans
- 2017: Palencia Baloncesto
- 2018–2020: Moncton Magic
- 2021–2022: Sudbury Five
- 2022–2023: Windsor Express

Jason Ryan Calliste (born January 27, 1990) is a Canadian former professional basketball player.

== Early life ==
Calliste is from Toronto and his father Jude runs an appliance-repair business in Ontario. Calliste moved to North Carolina to attend prep school.

== College career ==
Calliste played basketball at Detroit for four years and earned a communications degree. In his last season with the Titans, Calliste averaged 14.4 points, 3.3 assists, and 3.1 rebounds per game. He took advantage of the graduate transfer rule and moved to Oregon for his final season of eligibility. He came off the bench to help the Ducks to an NCAA tournament appearance. Calliste averaged 12.4 points and 2.0 rebounds per game in his only season in Eugene. His best game was a 31-point performance on December 22, 2013, in a 100–96 overtime win over BYU.

== Professional career ==
Calliste played his first professional season with the Maine Red Claws of the NBA Development League. In the 2015–16 season he played for BK Barons of Riga. In 2016, he rejoined the Red Claws. Later in the season, he returned to Canada to play for the KW Titans. In September he joined the Spanish team Palencia Baloncesto. In January 2018, Calliste joined the Moncton Magic and averaged 9.3 points and 2.7 rebounds per game in 34 games. In the 2018–19 season, Calliste averaged 9.4 points, 3.0 rebounds, and 1.3 assists per game. He was named to the All-Canadian Third Team. During the 2019–20 season, Calliste averaged 11.9 points, 3.5 rebounds, and 2.0 assists per game, earning All-Canadian First Team honors.
