= Brandon Wood (basketball) =

American basketball player (born 1989)

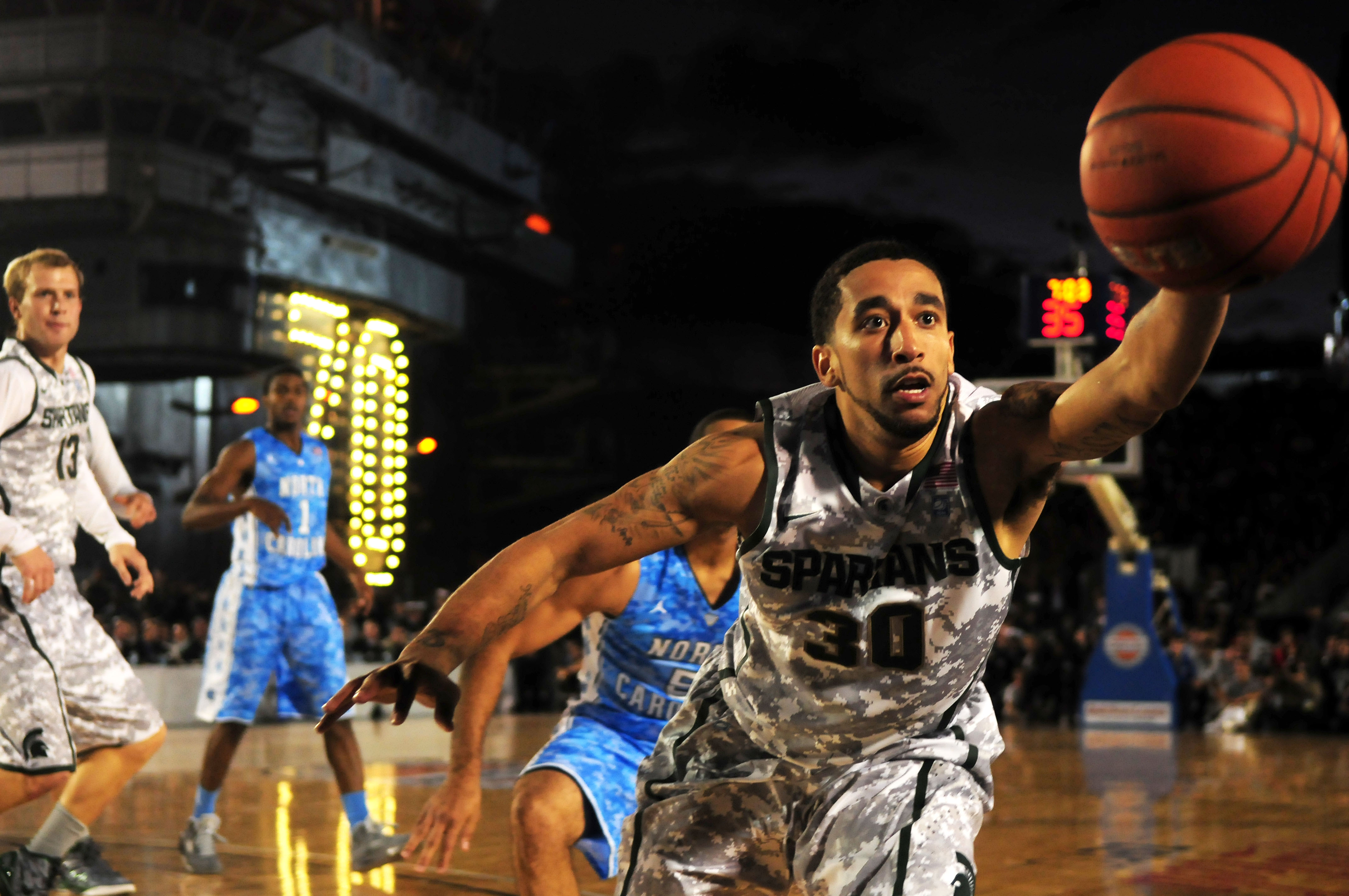
- Wood playing for Michigan State

Personal information
- Born: January 5, 1989 (age 37) Kokomo, Indiana, U.S.
- Listed height: 6 ft 2 in (1.88 m)
- Listed weight: 190 lb (86 kg)

Career information
- High school: Kokomo (Kokomo, Indiana)
- College: Southern Illinois (2007–2008); Highland CC (2008–2009); Valparaiso (2009–2011); Michigan State (2011–2012)
- NBA draft: 2012: undrafted
- Playing career: 2012–2021
- Position: Point guard / shooting guard

Career history
- 2012: MZT Skopje
- 2012–2013: Alba Fehérvár
- 2013–2014: Pallacanestro Trieste
- 2014: UBC Güssing Knights
- 2014–2015: Alba Fehérvár
- 2015: Feni Industries
- 2015: Lietkabelis Panevėžys
- 2016: Elitzur Yavne
- 2016–2017: BBC Monthey
- 2017–2018: Windy City Bulls
- 2018: Panionios
- 2019: AS Salé
- 2019–2021: Libertadores de Querétaro

Career highlights
- Swiss League champion (2017); Swiss Cup winner (2017); Hungarian League champion (2013); Hungarian Cup winner (2013); First-team All-Horizon League (2011); Second-team All-Horizon League (2010); Horizon League Freshman of the Year (2010)

Brandon Wood (born January 5, 1989) is an American former professional basketball player. He played college basketball for the Southern Illinois Salukis, Valparaiso Crusaders and Michigan State Spartans.

== High school career ==
Wood played high school basketball at Kokomo High School, in Kokomo, Indiana.

== College career ==
Wood played college basketball for Southern Illinois, Highland CC, Valparaiso and Michigan State from 2007 to 2012.

== Professional career ==
In January 2016 he signed with Israeli team Elitzur Yavne of the Liga Leumit. In August 2016 Wood signed for Swiss team BBC Monthey.

On November 6, 2018, Wood joined Panionios of the Greek Basket League. He left the team after only one game, but after the departure of head coach Vassilis Fragkias, he briefly returned to the team's squad, only to be dismissed once again.

In August 2019, Woods signed with Mexican club Libertadores de Querétaro of the LNBP.
