= 1–2–1–1 zone press =

Basketball strategy

In basketball, the 1–2–1–1 zone press (also called the diamond press) pressures the in-bounds passer, and attempts to trap the first pass receiver. The technique is considered a "gamble" because the higher chance of the ball being stolen with the amount of passing.

== Variations ==
Two variations of the technique exist; "one fist", in which the defenders immediately trap the first pass and "two fist", in which the defenders wait until the first pass receiver puts the ball on the floor and starts the dribble, and then quickly closes in and traps. In this situation, a player is waiting for the pass receiver to first commit with the dribble.

== Applications ==
Shaka Smart became one of the most well known users of this defense when put into his overall Havoc defense at his 2010–11 VCU Rams men's basketball team, which resulted in a Final Four run.

== See also ==
1–2–1–1 press in action
