= 2010–11 Hofstra Pride men's basketball team =

American college basketball season

2010–11 Hofstra Pride men's basketball

CBI, First round
- Conference: Colonial Athletic Association
- Record: 21–12 (14–4 CAA)
- Head coach: Mo Cassara (1st season)
- Associate head coach: Steven DeMeo (1st season)
- Assistant coaches: Allen Griffin (1st season); Wayne Morgan (1st season)
- Home arena: Mack Sports Complex

2010–11 CAA men's basketball standings
	Conf.				Overall
Team	W		L	PCT	W		L	PCT
George Mason	16	–	2	.889	27	–	7	.794
Old Dominion †	14	–	4	.778	27	–	7	.794
Hofstra	14	–	4	.778	21	–	12	.636
VCU	12	–	6	.667	28	–	12	.700
Drexel	11	–	7	.611	21	–	10	.677
James Madison	10	–	8	.556	21	–	12	.636
Delaware	8	–	10	.444	14	–	17	.452
UNCW	7	–	11	.389	13	–	18	.419
Georgia State	6	–	12	.333	12	–	19	.387
Northeastern	6	–	12	.333	11	–	20	.355
William & Mary	4	–	14	.222	10	–	22	.313
Towson	0	–	18	.000	4	–	26	.133
† 2011 CAA tournament winner Rankings from AP poll

The 2010–11 Hofstra Pride men's basketball team represented Hofstra University in the 2010–11 NCAA Division I men's basketball season. The Pride, led by head coach Mo Cassara, played their home games at the Mack Sports Complex in Hempstead, New York, as members of the Colonial Athletic Association. The Pride finished in a tie for second in the CAA during the regular season, earning the third seed in the CAA tournament. Hofstra won its first game in the tournament, but was eliminated in the semifinals by Old Dominion.

Hofstra failed to qualify for the NCAA tournament, but were invited to the 2011 College Basketball Invitational. The Pride were eliminated in the first round of the CBI in a loss to Evansville, 77–70.

== Roster ==
2010–11 Hofstra Pride men's basketball team
Players
Coaches

Pos.	#	Name	Height	Weight	Year	Hometown
G	0	Stevie Mejia	5 ft 9 in (1.75 m)	175 lb (79 kg)	Jr	Hyde Park, Massachusetts
G/F	1	Nathaniel Lester	6 ft 5 in (1.96 m)	210 lb (95 kg)	Sr	Brooklyn, New York
G	3	Brad Kelleher	6 ft 0 in (1.83 m)	185 lb (84 kg)	Sr	Victoria, Australia
G	4	Matt Grogan	6 ft 5 in (1.96 m)	195 lb (88 kg)	So	Middle Village, New York
F	5	David Imes	6 ft 7 in (2.01 m)	230 lb (104 kg)	So	Brooklyn, New York
G	11	Dwan McMillan	6 ft 1 in (1.85 m)	180 lb (82 kg)	Jr	Brooklyn, New York
F	12	Paul Bilbo	6 ft 8 in (2.03 m)	230 lb (104 kg)	RS Fr	Oyster Bay, New York
G	15	Shemiye McLendon	6 ft 3 in (1.91 m)	185 lb (84 kg)	Fr	Vero Beach, Florida
G	20	Yves Jules	6 ft 2 in (1.88 m)	180 lb (82 kg)	So	Brooklyn, New York
G	22	Charles Jenkins	6 ft 3 in (1.91 m)	220 lb (100 kg)	Sr	Queens, New York
G	23	Mike Moore	6 ft 5 in (1.96 m)	200 lb (91 kg)	Jr	New Haven, Connecticut
F	24	Stephen Nwaukoni	6 ft 8 in (2.03 m)	230 lb (104 kg)	Fr	Queens, New York
F	25	Roland Brown	6 ft 8 in (2.03 m)	250 lb (113 kg)	Fr	Queens, New York
F	32	Greg Washington	6 ft 10 in (2.08 m)	215 lb (98 kg)	Sr	Centereach, New York

Head coach

- Mo Cassara (St. Lawrence)

Assistant coach(es)

- Steven DeMeo (Buffalo)
- Allen Griffin (Syracuse)
- Wayne Morgan (St. Lawrence)

Legend

- (C) Team captain
- (S) Suspended
- (I) Ineligible
- (W) Walk-on
- Injured
- Current redshirt

Roster
Last update: January 25, 2023

== Schedule and results ==
Date time, TV	Rank^{#}	Opponent^{#}	Result	Record	Site (attendance) city, state
Regular season
November 13, 2010*; 4:00 pm, FiOS1		Farmingdale State	W 102–62	1–0	Mack Sports Complex (3,727); Hempstead, NY
November 18, 2010*; 5:00 pm, ESPN2		vs. No. 8 North Carolina; Puerto Rico Tip-Off	L 63–107	1–1	Coliseo de Puerto Rico (7,205); San Juan, Puerto Rico
November 19, 2010*; 6:00 pm		vs. Western Kentucky; Puerto Rico Tip-Off	L 60–62	1–2	Coliseo de Puerto Rico (10,127); San Juan, Puerto Rico
November 21, 2010*; 10:30 am, ESPNU		vs. Nebraska; Puerto Rico Tip-Off	L 47–62	1–3	Coliseo de Puerto Rico (11,575); San Juan, Puerto Rico
November 26, 2010*; 7:00 pm, FiOS1		Wagner	W 67–63	2–3	Mack Sports Complex (2,542); Hempstead, NY
November 29, 2010*; 7:00 pm		at Rider	W 58–48	3–3	Alumni Gymnasium (1,575); Lawrenceville, NJ
December 4, 2010; 4:00 pm, FiOS1		Towson	W 74–62	4–3 (1–0)	Mack Sports Complex (3,417); Hempstead, NY
December 8, 2010*; 7:00 pm		at Binghamton	W 89–85 ^{OT}	5–3	Binghamton University Events Center (2,807); Vestal, NY
December 11, 2010*; 4:00 pm, FiOS1		Florida Atlantic	L 59–63	5–4	Mack Sports Complex (2,514); Hempstead, NY
December 18, 2010*; 7:00 pm		at Manhattan	W 71–58	6–4	Draddy Gymnasium (763); Riverdale, NY
December 22, 2010*; 7:00 pm, FiOS1		Holy Cross	W 71–56	7–4	Mack Sports Complex (2,436); Hempstead, NY
December 29, 2010*; 7:30 pm		at Iona	L 62–87	7–5	Hynes Athletic Center (2,085); New Rochelle, NY
January 3, 2011; 7:00 pm		at Drexel	W 75–69	8–5 (2–0)	Daskalakis Athletic Center (2,085); Philadelphia, PA
January 5, 2011; 7:00 pm, FiOS1		George Mason	W 87–74	9–5 (3–0)	Mack Sports Complex (2,377); Hempstead, NY
January 8, 2011; 12:00 pm, MSG		at Northeastern	W 76–67	10–5 (4–0)	Matthews Arena (989); Boston, MA
January 12, 2011; 7:00 pm		at Towson	W 74–60	11–5 (5–0)	Towson Center (979); Towson, MD
January 15, 2011; 4:00 pm, MSG		Old Dominion	L 64–75	11–6 (5–1)	Mack Sports Complex (2,572); Hempstead, NY
January 19, 2011; 7:00 pm, FiOS1		UNC Wilmington	W 66–57	12–6 (6–1)	Mack Sports Complex (1,781); Hempstead, NY
January 22, 2011; 2:00 pm		at William & Mary	W 67–64	13–6 (7–1)	Kaplan Arena (3,195); Williamsburg, VA
January 24, 2011; 7:00 pm, MASN		James Madison	W 92–90 ^{OT}	14–6 (8–1)	Mack Sports Complex (2,324); Hempstead, NY
January 27, 2011; 7:00 pm, ESPNU		at VCU	L 67–82	14–7 (8–2)	Siegel Center (7,208); Richmond, VA
January 29, 2011; 4:00 pm, FiOS1		Drexel	L 60–65	14–8 (8–3)	Mack Sports Complex (5,050); Hempstead, NY
February 2, 2011; 7:00 pm		at George Mason	L 68–87	14–9 (8–4)	Patriot Center (5,230); Fairfax, VA
February 5, 2011; 4:00 pm, FiOS1		Northeastern	W 78–75	15–9 (9–4)	Mack Sports Complex (3,786); Hempstead, NY
February 9, 2011; 7:00 pm		at Georgia State	W 79–68	16–9 (10–4)	GSU Sports Arena (1,115); Atlanta, GA
February 12, 2011; 2:00 pm		at Delaware	W 61–58	17–9 (11–4)	Bob Carpenter Center (3,503); Newark, DE
February 15, 2011; 7:00 pm, FiOS1		William & Mary	W 81–78 ^{OT}	18–9 (12–4)	Mack Sports Complex (2,378); Hempstead, NY
February 19, 2011*; 7:30 pm		at Wright State; ESPN BracketBusters	L 56–82	18–10	Nutter Center (5,073); Dayton, OH
February 23, 2011; 7:00 pm		at UNC Wilmington	W 71–64	19–10 (13–4)	Trask Coliseum (3,656); Wilmington, NC
February 26, 2011; 2:00 pm, MSG		Delaware	W 79–60	20–10 (14–4)	Mack Sports Complex (5,050); Hempstead, NY
CAA tournament
March 5, 2011; 8:30 pm	(3)	vs. (11) William & Mary; CAA Quarterfinals	W 72–56	21–10	Richmond Coliseum (6,205); Richmond, VA
March 6, 2011; 2:30 pm	(3)	vs. (2) Old Dominion; CAA Semifinals	L 69–77	21–11	Richmond Coliseum (8,962); Richmond, VA
CBI
March 15, 2011; 8:05 pm		at Evansville; CBI First Round	L 70–77	21–12	Physical Activities Center (1,284); Evansville, IN
*Non-conference game. ^{#}Rankings from AP Poll. (#) Tournament seedings in parentheses. All times are in Eastern Time.
