= 2010–11 Colonial Athletic Association men's basketball season =

- League: NCAA Division I
- Sport: Basketball
- Teams: 12

Regular Season
- Champions: George Mason
- Season MVP: Charles Jenkins

Tournament
- Champions: Old Dominion

CAA men's basketball seasons
- ← 2009–10 2011–12 →

2010–11 CAA men's basketball standings
	Conf.				Overall
Team	W		L	PCT	W		L	PCT
George Mason	16	–	2	.889	27	–	7	.794
Old Dominion †	14	–	4	.778	27	–	7	.794
Hofstra	14	–	4	.778	21	–	12	.636
VCU	12	–	6	.667	28	–	12	.700
Drexel	11	–	7	.611	21	–	10	.677
James Madison	10	–	8	.556	21	–	12	.636
Delaware	8	–	10	.444	14	–	17	.452
UNCW	7	–	11	.389	13	–	18	.419
Georgia State	6	–	12	.333	12	–	19	.387
Northeastern	6	–	12	.333	11	–	20	.355
William & Mary	4	–	14	.222	10	–	22	.313
Towson	0	–	18	.000	4	–	26	.133
† 2011 CAA tournament winner Rankings from AP poll

The 2010–11 CAA men's basketball season marks the 26th season of Colonial Athletic Association basketball.

== Preseason ==
=== CAA preseason poll ===
Rank	Team
1	Old Dominion
2	George Mason
3	VCU
4	James Madison
5	Hofstra
6	Drexel
7	Northeastern
8	William & Mary
9	Delaware
10	Towson
11	Georgia State
12	UNC Wilmington

=== CAA preseason teams ===
Award	Recipients
First Team	Chaisson Allen (Northeastern); Denzel Bowles (James Madison); Charles Jenkins (Hofstra); Cam Long (George Mason); Joey Rodriguez (VCU)
Second Team	Kent Bazemore (Old Dominion); Jawan Carter (Delaware); Ben Finney (Old Dominion); Quinn McDowell (William & Mary); Julius Wells (James Madison)

== Conference awards & honors ==
=== CAA All-Conference teams ===
Award	Recipients
First Team	Chaisson Allen (Northeastern); Denzel Bowles (James Madison); Frank Hassell (Old Dominion); Charles Jenkins (Hofstra); Cam Long (George Mason)
Second Team	Kent Bazemore (Old Dominion); Samme Givens (Drexel); Ryan Pearson (George Mason); Jamie Skeen (VCU); Chad Tomko (UNC Wilmington)
Third Team	Jawan Carter (Delaware); Chris Fouch (Drexel); Luke Hancock (George Mason); Quinn McDowell (William & Mary); Joey Rodriguez (VCU)
Defensive Team	Chaisson Allen (Northeastern); Kent Bazemore (Old Dominion); Jamelle Hagins (Delaware); Frank Hassell (Old Dominion); Greg Washington (Hofstra)
Academic Team	James Fields (Georgia State); Trian Iliadis (Old Dominion); Brad Kelleher (Hofstra); Quinn McDowell (William & Mary); Brian Morris (Towson)
Player of the Year	Charles Jenkins (Hofstra)
Coach of the Year	Jim Larranaga (George Mason)
Rookie of the Year	Devon Saddler (Delaware)
Defensive Player of the Year	Kent Bazemore (Old Dominion)
Dean Ehlers Leadership Award	Quinn McDowell (William & Mary)
