= 2010–11 James Madison Dukes men's basketball team =

American college basketball season

2010–11 James Madison Dukes men's basketball

CBI, First round
- Conference: Colonial Athletic Association
- Record: 21–12 (10–8 CAA)
- Head coach: Matt Brady (3rd season)
- Associate head coach: Rob O'Driscoll (3rd season)
- Assistant coaches: Corey Stitzel (3rd season); Louis Rowe (1st season)
- Home arena: JMU Convocation Center

2010–11 CAA men's basketball standings
	Conf.				Overall
Team	W		L	PCT	W		L	PCT
George Mason	16	–	2	.889	27	–	7	.794
Old Dominion †	14	–	4	.778	27	–	7	.794
Hofstra	14	–	4	.778	21	–	12	.636
VCU	12	–	6	.667	28	–	12	.700
Drexel	11	–	7	.611	21	–	10	.677
James Madison	10	–	8	.556	21	–	12	.636
Delaware	8	–	10	.444	14	–	17	.452
UNCW	7	–	11	.389	13	–	18	.419
Georgia State	6	–	12	.333	12	–	19	.387
Northeastern	6	–	12	.333	11	–	20	.355
William & Mary	4	–	14	.222	10	–	22	.313
Towson	0	–	18	.000	4	–	26	.133
† 2011 CAA tournament winner Rankings from AP poll

The 2010–11 James Madison Dukes men's basketball team represented James Madison University in the 2010–11 NCAA Division I men's basketball season. The Dukes, led by head coach Matt Brady, played their home games at the JMU Convocation Center in Harrisonburg, Virginia, as members of the Colonial Athletic Association. The Dukes finished sixth in the CAA during the regular season, and were upset in the first round of the CAA tournament by William & Mary.

James Madison failed to qualify for the NCAA tournament, but were invited to the 2011 College Basketball Invitational. The Dukes were eliminated in the first round of the CBI in a loss to Davidson, 85–65.

== Roster ==
2010–11 James Madison Dukes men's basketball team
Players
Coaches

Pos.	#	Name	Height	Weight	Year	Hometown
G	0	A. J. Davis	6 ft 6 in (1.98 m)	210 lb (95 kg)	Jr	Columbus, Ohio
G	2	James Millen	6 ft 3 in (1.91 m)	180 lb (82 kg)	Jr	Cincinnati, Ohio
G	5	Alioune Diouf	6 ft 5 in (1.96 m)	210 lb (95 kg)	So	Powder Springs, Georgia
F	11	Andrey Semenov	6 ft 7 in (2.01 m)	200 lb (91 kg)	RS So	Saint Petersburg, Russia
G	12	Humpty Hitchens	5 ft 9 in (1.75 m)	175 lb (79 kg)	Jr	Chillicothe, Ohio
G	13	Andre Prince	6 ft 0 in (1.83 m)	180 lb (82 kg)	Fr	Houston, Texas
G	14	Ben Louis	6 ft 3 in (1.91 m)	200 lb (91 kg)	Sr	Melbourne, Australia
G	20	Kevin McGaughey	6 ft 5 in (1.96 m)	185 lb (84 kg)	Fr	Ashburn, Virginia
F	21	Denzel Bowles	6 ft 10 in (2.08 m)	160 lb (73 kg)	Sr	Virginia Beach, Virginia
G	24	Chad Jackson	6 ft 4 in (1.93 m)	185 lb (84 kg)	Fr	Georgetown, Kentucky
F	33	Rayshawn Goins	6 ft 6 in (1.98 m)	275 lb (125 kg)	Jr	Cleveland, Ohio
F	34	Julius Wells	6 ft 5 in (1.96 m)	205 lb (93 kg)	Jr	Toledo, Ohio
G	40	Devon Moore	6 ft 4 in (1.93 m)	180 lb (82 kg)	RS So	Columbus, Ohio
F	41	Trevon Flores	6 ft 10 in (2.08 m)	230 lb (104 kg)	So	Harvey, Louisiana

Head coach

- Matt Brady (Siena)

Assistant coach(es)

- Rob O'Driscoll (Villanova)
- Corey Stitzel (Elizabethtown)
- Louis Rowe (James Madison)

Legend

- (C) Team captain
- (S) Suspended
- (I) Ineligible
- (W) Walk-on
- Injured
- Current redshirt

Roster
Last update: January 25, 2023

== Schedule and results ==
Date time, TV	Rank^{#}	Opponent^{#}	Result	Record	Site (attendance) city, state
Exhibition
October 31, 2010*; 2:00 pm		Philadelphia	W 67–51	—	JMU Convocation Center; Harrisonburg, VA
Regular season
November 12, 2010*; 9:00 pm, ESPNU		at No. 3 Kansas State; CBE Classic	L 61–75	0–1	Bramlage Coliseum (12,528); Manhattan, KS
November 20, 2010*; 7:00 pm		at The Citadel	W 74–67	1–1	McAlister Field House (1,071); Charleston, SC
November 22, 2010*; 7:00 pm		Princeton; CBE Classic	W 65–64	2–1	JMU Convocation Center (3,113); Harrisonburg, VA
November 23, 2010*; 7:00 pm		Presbyterian; CBE Classic	W 65–56	3–1	JMU Convocation Center (3,084); Harrisonburg, VA
November 24, 2010*; 7:00 pm		Bucknell; CBE Classic	W 85–75	4–1	JMU Convocation Center (3,481); Harrisonburg, VA
November 27, 2010*; 7:00 pm		Eastern Michigan	W 74–68	5–1	JMU Convocation Center (2,866); Harrisonburg, VA
December 1, 2010*; 7:00 pm, FCS Atlantic		at Longwood	W 88–78	6–1	Willett Hall (1,963); Farmville, VA
December 4, 2010; 2:00 pm		at Georgia State	L 63–64	6–2 (0–1)	GSU Sports Arena (829); Atlanta, GA
December 7, 2010*; 7:00 pm		at Marshall	L 63–67	6–3	Cam Henderson Center (4,735); Huntington, WV
December 11, 2010*; 7:00 pm		at Radford	W 78–57	7–3	Dedmon Center (1,140); Radford, VA
December 18, 2010*; 7:00 pm		at South Florida	W 66–61	8–3	USF Sun Bowl (2,850); Tampa, FL
December 22, 2010*; 7:00 pm		Marshall	W 80–73	9–3	JMU Convocation Center (3,044); Harrisonburg, VA
December 31, 2010*; 2:00 pm		at Kent State	W 60–51	10–3	M.A.C. Center (2,862); Kent, OH
January 3, 2011; 7:00 pm		Northeastern	W 75–69	11–3 (1–1)	JMU Convocation Center (2,631); Harrisonburg, VA
January 5, 2011; 7:00 pm		Towson	W 99–68	12–3 (2–1)	JMU Convocation Center (2,769); Harrisonburg, VA
January 8, 2011; 7:00 pm		at William & Mary	W 84–79	13–3 (3–1)	Kaplan Arena (3,426); Williamsburg, VA
January 13, 2011; 8:30 pm		Georgia State	W 79–67	14–3 (4–1)	JMU Convocation Center (4,445); Harrisonburg, VA
January 15, 2011; 4:00 pm		UNC Wilmington	W 63–54	15–3 (5–1)	JMU Convocation Center (3,850); Harrisonburg, VA
January 19, 2011; 7:00 pm, Comcast Network		at Old Dominion	L 58–64	15–4 (5–2)	Constant Convocation Center (8,457); Norfolk, VA
January 22, 2011; 11:00 am, ESPNU		George Mason	L 73–75	15–5 (5–3)	JMU Convocation Center (5,714); Harrisonburg, VA
January 24, 2011; 7:00 pm, MASN		at Hofstra	L 90–92 ^{OT}	15–6 (5–4)	Mack Sports Complex (2,324); Hempstead, NY
January 26, 2011; 7:00 pm		Drexel	W 60–52	16–6 (6–4)	JMU Convocation Center (3,190); Harrisonburg, VA
January 29, 2011; 4:00 pm, CSN Mid-Atlantic		at Delaware	W 77–71	17–6 (7–4)	Bob Carpenter Center (2,429); Newark, DE
February 2, 2011; 7:00 pm, CSN Mid-Atlantic		William & Mary	L 67–73	17–7 (7–5)	JMU Convocation Center (3,508); Harrisonburg, VA
February 5, 2011; 12:00 pm, CSN Mid-Atlantic		VCU	L 66–70	17–8 (7–6)	JMU Convocation Center (4,989); Harrisonburg, VA
February 9, 2011; 7:00 pm		at Drexel	W 68–54	18–8 (8–6)	Daskalakis Athletic Center (2,093); Philadelphia, PA
February 12, 2011; 5:00 pm, CSN Mid-Atlantic		at George Mason	L 68–82	18–9 (8–7)	Patriot Center (9,840); Fairfax, VA
February 15, 2011; 7:00 pm		at Towson	W 72–61	19–9 (9–7)	Towson Center (1,082); Towson, MD
February 19, 2011*; 7:30 pm, ESPN3		Miami (OH); ESPN BracketBusters	W 70–69	20–9	JMU Convocation Center (4,283); Harrisonburg, VA
February 24, 2011; 7:00 pm, ESPNU		at Old Dominion	L 59–75	20–10 (9–8)	JMU Convocation Center (4,835); Harrisonburg, VA
February 26, 2011; 12:00 pm, Comcast Network		at VCU	W 72–69	21–10 (10–8)	Siegel Center (7,552); Richmond, VA
CAA tournament
March 4, 2011; 8:30 pm	(6)	vs. (11) William & Mary; CAA First Round	L 68–72	21–11	Richmond Coliseum (9,511); Richmond, VA
CBI
March 15, 2011; 7:00 pm		at Davidson; CBI First Round	L 65–85	21–12	John M. Belk Arena (989); Davidson, NC
*Non-conference game. ^{#}Rankings from AP Poll. (#) Tournament seedings in parentheses. All times are in Eastern Time.
