= Shaka Smart =

American college basketball coach (born 1977)

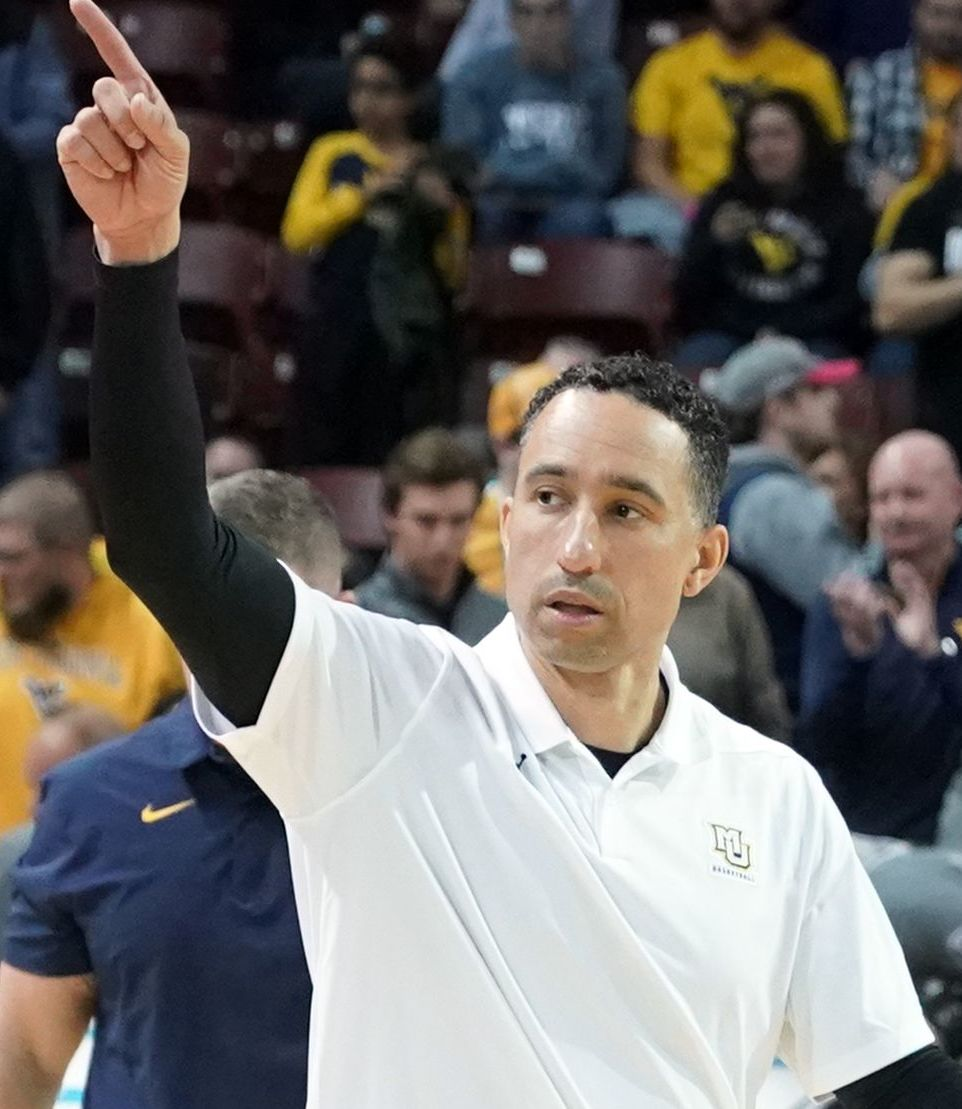
- Smart in 2021

Current position
- Title: Head coach
- Team: Marquette
- Conference: Big East
- Record: 114–63 (.644)

Biographical details
- Born: April 8, 1977 (age 49); Madison, Wisconsin, U.S.

Playing career
- 1995–1999: Kenyon
- Position: Point guard

Coaching career (HC unless noted)
- 1999–2001: California (PA) (assistant)
- 2003–2006: Akron (assistant)
- 2006–2008: Clemson (assistant)
- 2008–2009: Florida (assistant)
- 2009–2015: VCU
- 2015–2021: Texas
- 2021–present: Marquette

Administrative career (AD unless noted)
- 2001–2003: Dayton (basketball ops.)

Head coaching record
- Overall: 386–205 (.653)
- Tournaments: 10–12 (NCAA Division I); 5–0 (NIT); 5–0 (CBI)

Accomplishments and honors

Championships
- NCAA Division I Regional – Final Four (2011); NIT (2019); CBI (2010); CAA tournament (2012); Atlantic 10 tournament (2015); Big 12 tournament (2021); Big East regular season (2023); Big East tournament (2023)

Awards
- AP Coach of the Year (2023); NABC Coach of the Year (2023); Henry Iba Award (2023); Big East Coach of the Year (2023)

Shaka Dingani Smart (born April 8, 1977) is an American men's college basketball coach and former college basketball player. He is the current head men's basketball coach at Marquette University.

Smart rose to prominence in 2011 after leading Virginia Commonwealth University to its first and only Final Four appearance in school history in the 2011 NCAA tournament.

== Early life, education, and playing career ==
Smart was born April 8, 1977, in Madison, Wisconsin, to Winston Smart and Monica King. Smart's father was not supportive of Smart and left the family in 1994. He grew up in Fitchburg and attended Oregon High School in Oregon, Wisconsin. Smart, who is biracial, was one of "10 or so" students of color at Oregon High and experienced racism while attending the school. This led Smart to lead a student group which held multicultural events and seminars on homophobia and racism. He has said these experiences helped him develop his competitive drive.

While in high school, Smart played for the Oregon Panthers basketball team. He was a three-year starter as a point guard for the Panthers and set school records for assists in a game (20), season (291), and career (458). His senior season he was named to the All-Badger Conference second team.

After high school, Smart attended Kenyon College in Gambier, Ohio. He graduated magna cum laude with a degree in history, focusing on issues of race and the Great Migration. Smart was a four-year starter for the Kenyon Lords basketball team, and set school records for assists in a season (184) and career (542). As a senior, Smart was named to the All-North Coast Athletic Conference (NCAC) team and NCAC Scholar Athlete of the Year. Smart was also named to the 1999 USA Today All-USA Academic Team.

After graduating from Kenyon, Smart received an NCAA postgraduate scholarship and earned a master's degree in social science from California University of Pennsylvania.

== Coaching career ==
=== Assistant coach ===
Smart's coaching career began in 1999 as an assistant coach at California University of Pennsylvania under Bill Brown, his former coach at Kenyon. He followed that with a position as the director of basketball operations at University of Dayton and assistant coaching positions at University of Akron, Clemson University, and the University of Florida.

=== VCU ===
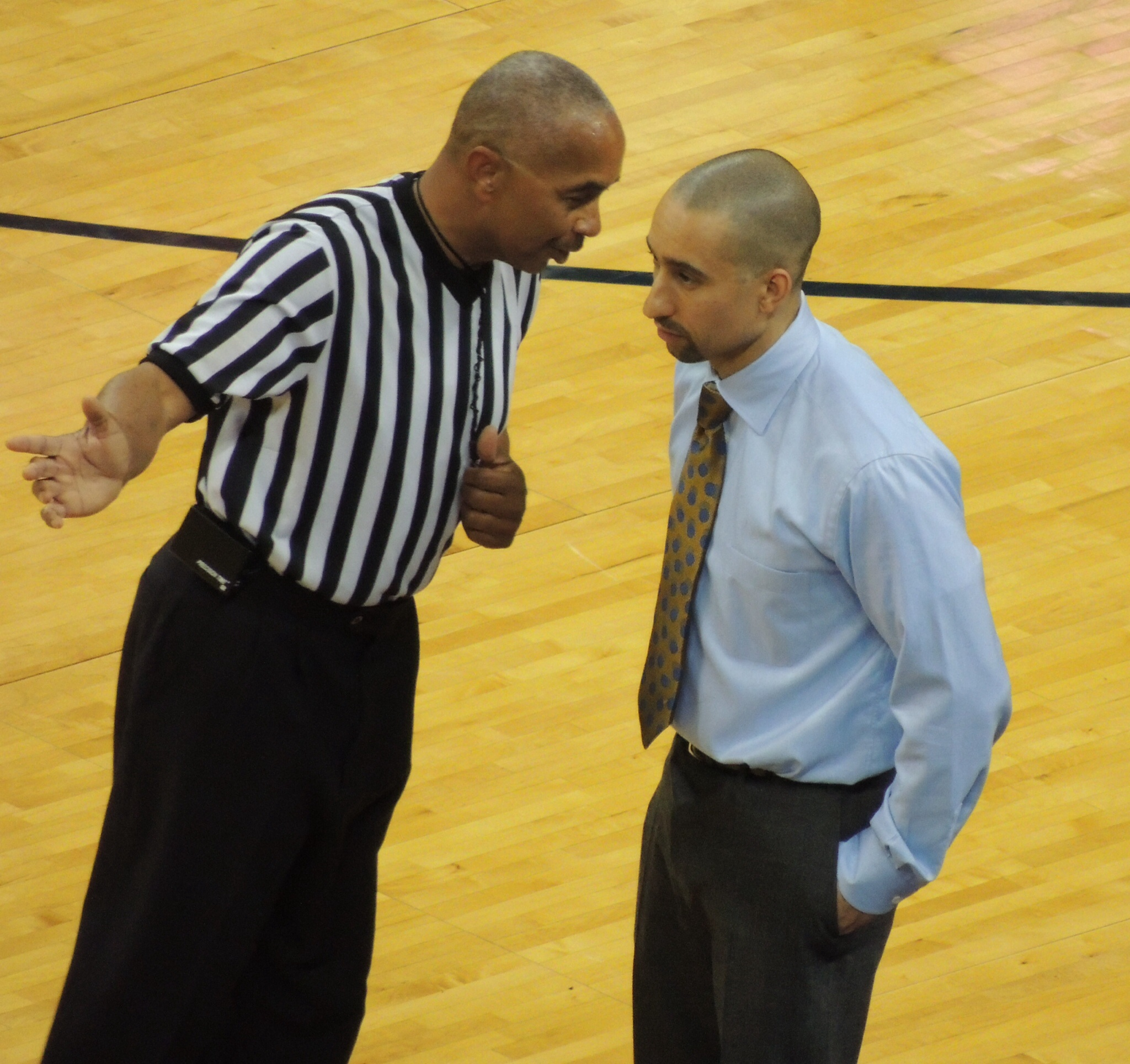
Smart while coaching VCU in 2013

In 2009, Smart was hired as the head coach of Virginia Commonwealth University (VCU) following Anthony Grant's departure to become the head coach of the Alabama Crimson Tide men's basketball team. At the time of his hiring, he was one of the youngest head coaches in NCAA Division I basketball. In his first season, he led the Rams to a 27–10 record and a CBI Championship after VCU swept Saint Louis in the championship best-of-three series.

Smart's second season began with star forward Larry Sanders declaring for the 2010 NBA draft. Without Sanders, the Rams went 23–11 and played in their second consecutive Colonial Athletic Association championship game, losing to Old Dominion.

VCU was given an at-large bid to the 2011 NCAA tournament. The decision was met with controversy given the Rams 3–5 record that February. They played in the First Four against University of Southern California (USC) for a spot in the main 64-team tournament bracket. VCU defeated USC and upset Georgetown University and Purdue University to advance to the Sweet 16 in the NCAA tournament for the first time in school history. VCU beat Florida State University 72–71 in overtime to earn the school's first spot in the Elite Eight and subsequently upset the top-seeded University of Kansas 71–61 for its first Final Four appearance. The Rams lost to Butler 70–62 in the semifinal game. Smart signed an eight-year, $1.2 million per year contract extension with VCU following the school's loss to Butler.

Smart became the second-youngest coach to win 100 games, with a 90–63 victory over Duquesne University in January 2013.

=== Texas ===
In 2015, Smart became the head coach of the University of Texas men's basketball team. In his first season at Texas, he led the Longhorns to a 20–13 record and received the sixth seed in the NCAA tournament, which the Houston Chronicle described as having "surpassed all realistic expectations." That offseason, Smart received a contract extension which would keep him at Texas through the 2022–23 season.

In May 2017, Smart received a commitment from Mohamed Bamba, the second-ranked overall player in the 2017 recruiting class, to play at Texas. He also received commitments from Gerald Liddell, Brock Cunningham, Jaxson Hayes, and Kamaka Hepa in what was the eighth-ranked recruiting class in the country. Smart led the 2017–18 Longhorns to a 19–15 record. The team lost in the first round of the 2018 NCAA Division I men's basketball tournament to the University of Nevada in overtime.

In the 2018–19 season, Smart led Texas to a 21–16 record and a National Invitation Tournament championship, the school's first since 1978.

Smart ended a three-season absence from the NCAA tournament in 2021 when he led the Longhorns to a 19–8 record and a Big 12 conference championship. The Longhorns were given the No. 3 seed in the NCAA tournament and were defeated by Abilene Christian University in the first round, after which San Antonio Express-News reporter Nick Moyle questioned Smart's job security. At the time, Smart had two years left on his coaching contract and could be bought out for $7.1 million. Smart left Texas in March 2021.

=== Marquette ===
Marquette University hired Smart to replace Steve Wojciechowski as the Golden Eagles' head coach in March 2021. Smart led the Golden Eagles to 19–13 record the following season, where they lost in the first round of the NCAA tournament to the University of North Carolina. In his second season in Milwaukee, Smart led the Golden Eagles to a Big East regular season crown and a tournament championship, despite being chosen in preseason polls to finish ninth in the conference.

At the close of the 2022–23 season, Smart won the Henry Iba Award as the national coach of the year.

=== Coaching style ===
At VCU, Smart's teams employed a high-pressure style of play known as "havoc". In this style, offense is based on attacking inside and the defense heavily utilizes full court pressure, double teams, and traps to force turnovers and disrupt opposing offenses. At Texas, Smart employed this style less frequently.

Smart has been described as a relationship builder and been noted for his ability to increase team camaraderie. Furthermore, Smart is nationally known as a player developer as opposed to acquiring players out of the transfer portal.

== Head coaching record ==
Record table
Season	Team	Overall	Conference	Standing	Postseason
VCU Rams (Colonial Athletic Association) (2009–2012)
2009–10	VCU	27–9	11–7	T–5th	CBI Champion
2010–11	VCU	28–12	12–6	4th	NCAA Division I Final Four
2011–12	VCU	29–7	15–3	2nd	NCAA Division I Round of 32
VCU Rams (Atlantic 10 Conference) (2012–2015)
2012–13	VCU	27–9	12–4	2nd	NCAA Division I Round of 32
2013–14	VCU	26–9	12–4	2nd	NCAA Division I Round of 64
2014–15	VCU	26–10	12–6	T–4th	NCAA Division I Round of 64
VCU:		163–56 (.744)	74–30 (.712)		
Texas Longhorns (Big 12 Conference) (2015–2021)
2015–16	Texas	20–13	11–7	4th	NCAA Division I Round of 64
2016–17	Texas	11–22	4–14	10th	
2017–18	Texas	19–15	8–10	T–6th	NCAA Division I Round of 64
2018–19	Texas	21–16	8–10	6th	NIT Champion
2019–20	Texas	19–12	9–9	T–3rd	Postseason cancelled due to COVID-19
2020–21	Texas	19–8	11–6	3rd	NCAA Division I Round of 64
Texas:		109–86 (.559)	51–56 (.477)		
Marquette Golden Eagles (Big East Conference) (2021–present)
2021–22	Marquette	19–13	11–8	T–5th	NCAA Division I Round of 64
2022–23	Marquette	29–7	17–3	1st	NCAA Division I Round of 32
2023–24	Marquette	27–10	14–6	T–2nd	NCAA Division I Sweet 16
2024–25	Marquette	23–11	13–7	T-4th	NCAA Division I Round of 64
2025–26	Marquette	12–20	7–13	T–7th	
2026–27	Marquette	4–2	0–0		
Marquette:		114–63 (.644)	62–37 (.626)		
Total:		386–205 (.653)			
National champion Postseason invitational champion Conference regular season champion Conference regular season and conference tournament champion Division regular season champion Division regular season and conference tournament champion Conference tournament champion

== Personal life ==
Smart was named after the Zulu monarch Shaka kaSenzangakhona. Though often teased about his name growing up, Smart has said being named Shaka was the "best thing" his father did for him. Smart's middle name, Dingani, is a Ndebele word meaning "one who is searching".

Smart is married to Maya Payne Smart, an author and professor at Marquette University. The couple have one child. He has six siblings.

Smart campaigned for Barack Obama in Florida in 2008 and Virginia in 2012.

== See also ==
- List of NCAA Division I men's basketball tournament Final Four appearances by coach
