= 2010–11 Old Dominion Monarchs basketball team =

American college basketball season

2010–11 Old Dominion Monarchs basketball

CAA tournament champions Paradise Jam tournament champions

NCAA tournament, Round of 64
- Conference: Colonial Athletic Association
- Record: 27–7 (14–4 CAA)
- Head coach: Blaine Taylor
- Assistant coaches: Jim Corrigan; Robert Wilkes; Lonnie Blos
- Home arena: Ted Constant Convocation Center

2010–11 CAA men's basketball standings
	Conf.				Overall
Team	W		L	PCT	W		L	PCT
George Mason	16	–	2	.889	27	–	7	.794
Old Dominion †	14	–	4	.778	27	–	7	.794
Hofstra	14	–	4	.778	21	–	12	.636
VCU	12	–	6	.667	28	–	12	.700
Drexel	11	–	7	.611	21	–	10	.677
James Madison	10	–	8	.556	21	–	12	.636
Delaware	8	–	10	.444	14	–	17	.452
UNCW	7	–	11	.389	13	–	18	.419
Georgia State	6	–	12	.333	12	–	19	.387
Northeastern	6	–	12	.333	11	–	20	.355
William & Mary	4	–	14	.222	10	–	22	.313
Towson	0	–	18	.000	4	–	26	.133
† 2011 CAA tournament winner Rankings from AP poll

The 2010–11 Old Dominion Monarchs basketball team represented Old Dominion University during the 2010–11 NCAA Division I men's basketball season. The Monarchs, led by 10th year head coach Blaine Taylor, played their home games at Ted Constant Convocation Center and are members of the Colonial Athletic Association.

They finished the season 27–7, 14–4 in CAA play and were champions of the 2011 CAA men's basketball tournament to earn an automatic bid to the 2011 NCAA Division I men's basketball tournament where they lost in the second round to Butler.

== Roster ==
Roster
Number	Name	Position	Height	Weight	Year	Hometown
1	Nick Wright	Forward	6–8	208	Sophomore	Suffolk, Virginia
2	Josh Hicks	Guard	6–2	190	Freshman	Winston-Salem, North Carolina
3	Darius James	Guard	6–0	170	Senior	Virginia Beach, Virginia
4	Dimitri Batten	Guard	6–3	190	Freshman	Newport News, Virginia
15	Trian Iliadis	Guard	6–3	185	Junior	Perth, Australia
20	Chris Cooper	Forward	6–9	230	Junior	Dumfries, Virginia
21	Frank Hassell	Forward	6–9	255	Senior	Chesapeake, Virginia
22	Marquel De Lancey	Guard	6–0	190	Junior	Alexandria, Virginia
23	Richard Ross	Forward	6–7	205	Freshman	Wichita Falls, Texas
24	Kent Bazemore	Guard/Forward	6–5	195	Junior	Kelford, North Carolina
33	Keyon Carter	Forward	6–8	218	Senior	Riviera Beach, Florida
35	Ben Finney	Guard/Forward	6–5	215	Senior	Portsmouth, Virginia
40	Anton Larsen	Forward/Center	7–0	240	Freshman	Copenhagen, Denmark

== Schedule ==
Date time, TV	Rank^{#}	Opponent^{#}	Result	Record	Site (attendance) city, state
Exhibition
11/1/10*; 7:00 pm		Virginia State	W 79–48	—	Ted Constant Center (2,297); Norfolk, Virginia
11/6/10*; 7:00 pm		Elizabeth City State	W 74–41	—	Ted Constant Center (5,615); Norfolk, Virginia
Regular season
11/12/10*; 7:00 pm, CSN+		No. 20 Georgetown	L 59–62	0–1	Ted Constant Center (8,457); Norfolk, Virginia
11/15/10*; 7:00 pm		High Point	W 79–57	1–1	Ted Constant Center (6,836); Norfolk, Virginia
11/19/10*; 1:00 pm		vs. Saint Peter's; Paradise Jam first round	W 59–52	2–1	Sports and Fitness Center; Saint Thomas, VI
11/21/10*; 6:00 pm, FCS		vs. Clemson; Paradise Jam semifinals	W 61–60	3–1	Sports and Fitness Center; Saint Thomas, VI
11/22/10*; 8:00 pm		vs. Xavier; Paradise Jam final	W 67–58	4–1	Sports and Fitness Center (3,893); Saint Thomas, VI
12/1/10*; 7:00 pm, WSKY		Richmond	W 77–70	5–1	Ted Constant Center (7,824); Norfolk, Virginia
12/4/10; 7:00 pm		at Delaware	L 67–75	5–2 (0–1)	Bob Carpenter Center (2,201); Newark, Delaware
12/7/10*; 7:00 pm		at East Carolina	W 81–68	6–2	Williams Arena at Minges Coliseum (4,358); Greenville, North Carolina
12/9/10*; 7:00 pm		Maryland Eastern Shore	W 81–39	7–2	Ted Constant Center (6,767); Norfolk, Virginia
12/11/10*; 4:00 pm, CSNMA		Dayton	W 74–71	8–2	Ted Constant Center (7,563); Norfolk, Virginia
12/23/10*; 7:00 pm		Presbyterian	W 63–54	9–2	Ted Constant Center (6,738); Norfolk, Virginia
12/30/10*; 8:00 pm		at No. 10 Missouri	L 58–81	9–3	Mizzou Arena (13,107); Columbia, Missouri
1/3/11; 7:00 pm		at Towson	W 51–47	10–3 (1–1)	Towson Center (1,483); Towson, Maryland
1/5/11; 7:00 pm		Northeastern	W 49–34	11–3 (2–1)	Ted Constant Center (6,223); Norfolk, Virginia
1/8/11; 2:00 pm, CSNMA		George Mason	W 69–65	12–3 (3–1)	Ted Constant Center (8,344); Norfolk, Virginia
1/13/11; 7:00 pm, ESPNU		at Drexel	L 57–62	12–4 (3–2)	Daskalakis Athletic Center (2,532); Philadelphia, Pennsylvania
1/15/11; 4:00 pm, CSN		at Hofstra	W 75–64	13–4 (4–2)	Hofstra Arena (2,572); Hempstead, New York
1/19/11; 7:00 pm		James Madison; Rivalry	W 64–58	14–4 (5–2)	Ted Constant Center (8,457); Norfolk, Virginia
1/22/11; 4:00 pm, CSNMA		VCU; Rivalry	L 50–59	14–5 (5–3)	Ted Constant Center (8,457); Norfolk, Virginia
1/24/11; 7:00 pm		UNC Wilmington	W 58–43	15–5 (6–3)	Ted Constant Center (7,308); Norfolk, Virginia
1/26/11; 7:30 pm		at Georgia State	W 51–48	16–5 (7–3)	GSU Sports Arena (967); Atlanta
1/29/11; 5:00 pm, ESPNU		Towson	W 80–57	17–5 (8–3)	Ted Constant Center (8,181); Norfolk, Virginia
2/2/11; 7:00 pm		Delaware	W 67–59	18–5 (9–3)	Ted Constant Center (8,042); Norfolk, Virginia
2/5/11; 2:00 pm, CSNMA		at George Mason	L 45–62	18–6 (9–4)	Patriot Center (9,840); Fairfax, Virginia
2/9/11; 7:00 pm, CSNMA+		at William & Mary; Rivalry	W 69–53	19–6 (10–4)	Kaplan Arena (3,843); Williamsburg, Virginia
2/12/11; 2:00 pm, ESPN2		at VCU; Rivalry	W 70–59	20–6 (11–4)	Stuart C. Siegel Center (7,552); Richmond, Virginia
2/15/11; 7:00 pm, CSNMA		Georgia State	W 60–43	21–6 (12–4)	Ted Constant Center (7,307); Norfolk, Virginia
2/20/11*; 1:00 pm, ESPN2		Cleveland State; ESPN BracketBusters	W 74–63	22–6	Ted Constant Center (8,328); Norfolk, Virginia
2/24/11; 7:00 pm, ESPNU		at James Madison; Rivalry	W 75–59	23–6 (13–4)	JMU Convocation Center (4,835); Harrisonburg, Virginia
2/26/11; 4:00 pm, CSNMA		William & Mary; Rivalry	W 77–58	24–6 (14–4)	Ted Constant Center (8,457); Norfolk, Virginia
CAA tournament
3/5/11; 6:00 pm, WSKY	(2)	vs. (7) Delaware; CAA Quarterfinals	W 59–50	25–6	Richmond Coliseum (6,205); Richmond, Virginia
3/6/11; 2:30 pm, WSKY	(2)	vs. (3) Hofstra; CAA Semifinals	W 77–69	26–6	Richmond Coliseum (8,962); Richmond, Virginia
3/7/11; 7:00 pm, ESPN	(2)	vs. (4) VCU; CAA Championship Game	W 70–65	27–6	Richmond Coliseum (11,200); Richmond, Virginia
NCAA tournament
3/17/11*; 12:40 pm, truTV	(9 SE)	vs. (8 SE) Butler; NCAA Second Round	L 58–60	27–7	Verizon Center (17,578); Washington, D.C.
*Non-conference game. ^{#}Rankings from AP Poll. (#) Tournament seedings in parentheses. SE=NCAA Southeast Regional. All times are in Eastern Time.
