= 2010 Paradise Jam =

Basketball tournament

- Season: 2010–11
- Teams: 8
- Finals site: Sports and Fitness Center, Saint Thomas, U.S. Virgin Islands
- Champions: Old Dominion (men's); Georgetown (women's Island); West Virginia (women's Reef)
- MVP: Ben Finney, Old Dominion (men's); Summer Rodgers, Georgetown (women's Island); Liz Rapella, West Virginia (women's Reef)

The 2010 Paradise Jam was an early-season men's and women's college basketball tournament. The tournament, which began in 2000, was part of the 2010–11 NCAA Division I men's basketball season and 2010–11 NCAA Division I women's basketball season. The tournament was played at the Sports and Fitness Center in Saint Thomas, U.S. Virgin Islands. Old Dominion won the men's tournament, In the women's tournament Georgetown won the Island Division and West Virginia won the women's Reef Division.

== Men's tournament ==
5th place game November 21
Long Beach State	78
Iowa	72
7th place game
Saint Peter's	50
Alabama	49

Consolation 2nd round November 20
Saint Peter's	56
Long Beach State	68
Alabama	47
Iowa	55

First round November 19
Saint Peter's	52
Old Dominion	59
Long Beach State	55
Clemson	69
Alabama	78
Seton Hall	83
Iowa	73
Xavier	86

Semifinals; November 20
Old Dominion	61
Clemson	60
Seton Hall	52
Xavier	57

Championship; November 21
Old Dominion	67
Xavier	58
3rd place game
Clemson	64
Seton Hall	58

== Women's tournament ==
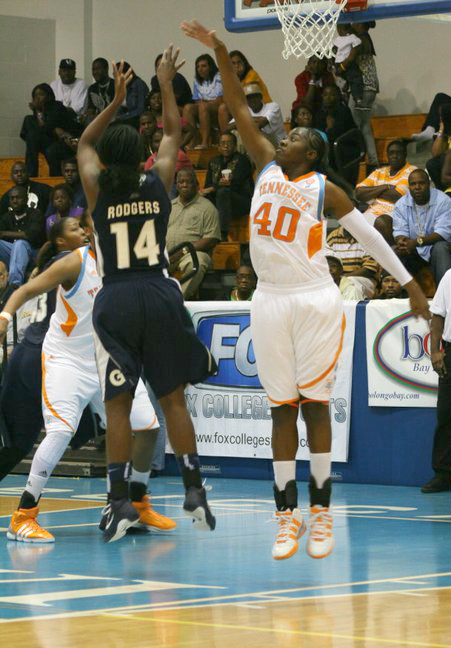
Georgetown's Sugar Rodgers shoots over Tennessee's Shekinna Stricklen at the 2010 Paradise Jam.

The women's tournament was organized as two divisions of four teams, each playing each other in a round-robin format.

=== Island Division ===
On Thanksgiving, Tennessee beat Missouri 82–44, while Georgetown beat Georgia Tech 67–58. The next day, 12th-ranked (AP) Georgetown lost to unranked Missouri 54–45, while Tennessee beat Georgia Tech 66–42. On the final day of the tournament, Georgia Tech beat Missouri, 61–46.

The other final game matched up Georgetown, with a 1–1 record, against Tennessee, who was ranked 4th in the AP poll. Georgetown's Sugar Rogers, who had not played particularly well in the first two games of the tournament, had 28 points to help lead her team to an upset victory over Tennessee. The Hoyas opened up with an 11–4 run and never trailed. Tennessee out-rebounded Georgetown 42—24, but committed 29 turnovers. Both teams shot about 40% from the field, but the Hoyas had an advantage beyond the arc, hitting 10 of their 18 three point attempts, while the Volunteers hit only three of 18 attempts. The two team ended with 2–1 records, but with the head-to-head tiebreaker, Georgetown won the Island Division championship of the Paradise Jam.

November 25
Tennessee	82
Missouri	33

November 25
Georgetown	67
Georgia Tech	58

November 26
Missouri	54
Georgetown	45

November 26
Georgia Tech	42
Tennessee	66

November 27
Georgia Tech	61
Missouri	46

November 27
Georgetown	69
Tennessee	58

=== Reef Division ===
November 25
TCU	49
West Virginia	62

November 25
Virginia	48
Iowa State	66

November 26
West Virginia	57
Virginia	43

November 26
Iowa State	64
TCU	59

November 27
Iowa State	53
West Virginia	64

November 27
Virginia	59
TCU	55
