= 2010–11 George Mason Patriots men's basketball team =

American college basketball season

2010–11 George Mason Patriots men's basketball

CAA Regular Season Champions

NCAA Tournament, Round of 32
- Conference: Colonial Athletic Association
- Record: 27–7 (16–2 CAA)
- Head coach: Jim Larranaga
- Assistant coaches: Eric Konkol; Chris Caputo; Michael Huger
- Home arena: Patriot Center

2010–11 CAA men's basketball standings
	Conf.				Overall
Team	W		L	PCT	W		L	PCT
George Mason	16	–	2	.889	27	–	7	.794
Old Dominion †	14	–	4	.778	27	–	7	.794
Hofstra	14	–	4	.778	21	–	12	.636
VCU	12	–	6	.667	28	–	12	.700
Drexel	11	–	7	.611	21	–	10	.677
James Madison	10	–	8	.556	21	–	12	.636
Delaware	8	–	10	.444	14	–	17	.452
UNCW	7	–	11	.389	13	–	18	.419
Georgia State	6	–	12	.333	12	–	19	.387
Northeastern	6	–	12	.333	11	–	20	.355
William & Mary	4	–	14	.222	10	–	22	.313
Towson	0	–	18	.000	4	–	26	.133
† 2011 CAA tournament winner Rankings from AP poll

The 2010–11 George Mason Patriots men's basketball team represented George Mason University during the 2010–11 college basketball season. This was the 45th season for the program. Led by fourteenth-year head coach Jim Larranaga, the Patriots were members of the Colonial Athletic Association (CAA) and played home games on campus at the Patriot Center in Fairfax, Virginia.

Undefeated at home, George Mason finished the regular season at 25–5 (16–2 in CAA) to win the conference's regular season championship. The Patriots were upset in the semifinals of the conference tournament by fourth-seeded VCU. GMU received an at-large bid to the NCAA tournament and were the eighth seed in the East region. They defeated Villanova in the second round (64 teams), then fell to top-ranked Ohio State to finish at 27–7 (.794).

After the season, Larranaga left for the University of Miami and was succeeded by Paul Hewitt, previously the head coach at Georgia Tech.

== Season notes ==
- After a February 15 victory over VCU, the men's basketball team set a new school record with twelve consecutive wins.
- From August 18 to August 28, the men's basketball team toured Italy and were scheduled to play four games against Italian semi-professional teams. The final game had to be canceled due to poor court conditions. The Patriots won all three games versus Lombardia, GMV Ghezzano and Forlì.

== Awards ==
CAA Coach of the Year

- Jim Larranaga

First Team All-CAA

- Cam Long

Second Team All-CAA

- Ryan Pearson

Third Team All-CAA

- Luke Hancock

CAA Player of the Week

- Ryan Pearson - Jan. 17
- Cam Long - Jan. 24
- Ryan Pearson - Feb. 7
- Ryan Pearson - Feb. 21

== Roster ==
2010–11 George Mason Patriots men's basketball team
Players
Coaches

Pos.	#	Name	Height	Weight	Year	Previous school	Hometown
G	3	Bryon Allen	6 ft 3 in (1.91 m)	215 lb (98 kg)	Fr	St. Thomas More	Largo, MD
F	5	Jonathan Arledge	6 ft 9 in (2.06 m)	236 lb (107 kg)	Fr	KIMA	Washington, DC
F	30	Thomas Armistead	6 ft 6 in (1.98 m)	190 lb (86 kg)	Fr	Clover Hill	Richmond, VA
F	1	Paris Bennett	6 ft 6 in (1.98 m)	190 lb (86 kg)	RS Fr	St. Patrick's	Elizabeth, NJ
G	45	Andre Cornelius	5 ft 10 in (1.78 m)	172 lb (78 kg)	Jr	Victory Christian	Charlotte, NC
G	14	Luke Hancock	6 ft 4 in (1.93 m)	175 lb (79 kg)	So	Hidden Valley/Hargrave	Roanoke, VA
G	20	Cam Long (C)	6 ft 4 in (1.93 m)	187 lb (85 kg)	Sr	Freedom	Palm Bay, FL
F	22	Mike Morrison	6 ft 9 in (2.06 m)	222 lb (101 kg)	Jr	Lakewood	St. Petersburg, FL
F	24	Ryan Pearson	6 ft 6 in (1.98 m)	230 lb (104 kg)	Jr	Christ the King	Far Rockaway, NY
G	13	Isaiah Tate	6 ft 4 in (1.93 m)	214 lb (97 kg)	Sr	DeMatha	Upper Marlboro, MD
G	4	Vertrail Vaughns	6 ft 2 in (1.88 m)	185 lb (84 kg)	RS Fr	Mesquite	Mesquite, TX
G	23	Rashad Whack	6 ft 2 in (1.88 m)	170 lb (77 kg)	So	Bishop McNamara	Forestville, MD
F	32	Johnnie Williams	6 ft 8 in (2.03 m)	249 lb (113 kg)	So	Briarcrest Christian	Memphis, TN
G	15	Sherrod Wright (injured)	6 ft 4 in (1.93 m)	190 lb (86 kg)	RS So	Mount Vernon	Mount Vernon, NY

Head coach

- Jim Larranaga (Providence)

Assistant coach(es)

- Eric Konkol (Wisconsin-Eau Claire)
- Michael Huger (Bowling Green)
- Chris Caputo (Westfield)

Legend

- (C) Team captain
- (S) Suspended
- (I) Ineligible
- (W) Walk-on
- Injured
- Current redshirt

Roster
Last update: 2010-07-27

== Stats ==
Player	GP	GS	MPG	FG%	3FG%	FT%	RPG	APG	SPG	BPG	PPG
Cam Long	34	34	33.0	.479	.432	.750	4.7	2.9	1.4	0.2	15.1
Ryan Pearson	34	33	30.3	.511	.400	.708	6.7	1.2	0.9	0.6	14.2
Luke Hancock	33	31	28.6	.494	.359	.810	4.2	4.3	1.0	0.5	10.9
Andre Cornelius	34	34	27.1	.419	.386	.833	2.3	1.6	1.0	0.1	9.5
Mike Morrison	34	34	24.4	.562	.000	.394	5.5	1.7	0.6	1.2	6.8
Isaiah Tate	34	4	20.6	.442	.412	.667	2.4	0.8	0.8	0.2	6.2
Vertrail Vaughns	32	0	9.5	.472	.493	.667	1.1	0.3	0.3	0.0	4.5
Johnnie Williams	32	0	9.2	.478	.000	.688	1.3	0.3	0.2	0.2	2.4
Jonathan Arledge	28	0	5.5	.368	.250	.688	0.9	0.2	0.2	0.1	1.4
Bryon Allen	27	0	5.8	.302	.154	.692	0.6	0.7	0.0	0.0	1.4
Paris Bennett	33	1	8.9	.381	.000	.556	1.5	0.5	0.2	0.2	1.1
Rashaad Whack	22	0	5.3	.333	.100	.750	1.3	0.3	0.1	0.0	0.8
Thomas Armistead	6	0	1.3	.000	.000	.000	0.0	0.0	0.0	0.0	0.0

== Game log ==
Date time, TV	Rank^{#}	Opponent^{#}	Result	Record	High points	High rebounds	High assists	Site (attendance) city, state
Exhibition
November 3, 2010*; 7:00 pm		Bowie State	W 113–76	–	– -	– -	– -	Patriot Center (1,444); Fairfax, VA
Regular season
November 13, 2010*; 4:00 pm		Harvard	W 66–53	1–0	14 – Hancock	10 – Long	6 – Long	Patriot Center (6,536); Fairfax, VA
November 18, 2010*; 8:30 pm, MASN		vs. Charlotte; ESPN Charleston Classic	W 78–56	2–0	18 – Hancock	6 – Long	3 – Tied (4)	Carolina First Arena (2,639); Charleston, SC
November 19, 2010*; 6:00 pm, ESPNU		vs. NC State; ESPN Charleston Classic	L 65–78	2–1	16 – Long	6 – Hancock	3 – Morrison	Carolina First Arena; Charleston, SC
November 21, 2010*; 5:30 pm, ESPNU		vs. Wofford; ESPN Charleston Classic	L 79–82 ^{OT}	2–2	17 – Hancock	11 – Pearson	3 – Cornelius, Hancock, Morrison	Carolina First Arena; Charleston, SC
November 24, 2010*; 7:00 pm		Radford	W 81–55	3–2	20 – Long	8 – Hancock	11 – Hancock	Patriot Center (4,273); Fairfax, VA
November 27, 2010*; 4:00 pm		Florida Atlantic	W 66–51	4–2	18 – Morrison	7 – Morrison	7 – Hancock	Patriot Center (3,907); Fairfax, VA
December 1, 2010*; 7:00 pm		George Washington	W 60–46	5–2	15 – Hancock	8 – Hancock, Morrison	3 – Cornelius, Long	Patriot Center (5,560); Fairfax, VA
December 4, 2010; 7:30 pm, MASN		UNC Wilmington	W 80–53	6–2 (1–0)	16 – Tate	5 – Morrison, Pearson, Vaughns	5 – Cornelius	Patriot Center (5,461); Fairfax, VA
December 8, 2010*; 7:00 pm, MASN		Loyola (MD)	W 66–52	7–2	18 – Pearson	6 – Cornelius	7 – Hancock	Patriot Center (4,674); Fairfax, VA
December 11, 2010*; 7:00 pm, MASN		at Liberty	W 84–54	8–2	16 – Long, Pearson	8 – Long	4 – Hancock	Vines Center (2,747); Lynchburg, VA
December 22, 2010*; 8:00 pm		at Duquesne	W 85–79 ^{2OT}	9–2	17 – Long, Pearson	11 – Pearson	4 – Hancock	A. J. Palumbo Center (2,107); Pittsburgh, PA
December 29, 2010*; 7:00 pm, Fox Sports Ohio		at Dayton	L 67–73	9–3	20 – Long	7 – Pearson	5 – Hancock	UD Arena (13,371); Dayton, OH
January 3, 2011; 7:00 pm, Comcast		Delaware	W 75–66	10–3 (2–0)	19 – Pearson	7 – Hancock	5 – Hancock	Patriot Center (4,719); Fairfax, VA
January 5, 2011; 7:00 pm		at Hofstra	L 74–87	10–4 (2–1)	22 – Pearson	8 – Pearson	3 – Bennett, Hancock	Hofstra Arena (2,377); Hempstead, NY
January 8, 2011; 2:00 pm, Comcast		at Old Dominion	L 65–69	10–5 (2–2)	23 – Long	7 – Long, Morrison	3 – Cornelius	Ted Constant Convocation Center (8,344); Norfolk, VA
January 12, 2011; 7:00 pm		at Northeastern	W 86–60	11–5 (3–2)	24 – Pearson	6 – Pearson	10 – Hancock	Matthews Arena (1,570); Boston, MA
January 15, 2011; 2:00 pm, Comcast		Georgia State	W 66–51	12–5 (4–2)	18 – Long	6 – Cornelius, Tate	3 – Hancock	Patriot Center (5,714); Fairfax, VA
January 19, 2011; 9:00 pm, MASN		Drexel	W 71–47	13–5 (5–2)	16 – Hancock	9 – Hancock	4 – Hancock	Patriot Center (3,630); Fairfax, VA
January 22, 2011; 11:00 am, ESPNU		at James Madison	W 75–73	14–5 (6–2)	30 – Long	6 – Pearson	5 – Long	JMU Convocation Center (5,714); Harrisonburg, VA
January 24, 2011; 9:00 pm, MASN		at Delaware	W 69–49	15–5 (7–2)	20 – Long	8 – Morrison	3 – Long	Bob Carpenter Center (1,846); Newark, DE
January 27, 2011; 4:00 pm		Towson	W 84–57	16–5 (8–2)	19 – Hancock	6 – Pearson	8 – Long	Patriot Center (3,791); Fairfax, VA
January 29, 2011; 12:00 pm, Comcast		at William & Mary	W 85–69	17–5 (9–2)	20 – Long	7 – Pearson	4 – Hancock	Kaplan Arena (3,074); Williamsburg, VA
February 2, 2011; 7:00 pm		Hofstra	W 87–68	18–5 (10–2)	22 – Cornelius	12 – Pearson	7 – Hancock	Patriot Center (5,230); Fairfax, VA
February 5, 2011; 2:00 pm, Comcast		Old Dominion; Homecoming	W 62–45	19–5 (11–2)	18 – Pearson	11 – Pearson	4 – Hancock	Patriot Center (9,840); Fairfax, VA
February 8, 2011; 7:00 pm, MASN		at UNC Wilmington	W 78–63	20–5 (12–2)	25 – Cornelius	9 – Pearson	5 – Long	Trask Coliseum (3,768); Wilmington, NC
February 12, 2011; 5:00 pm, MASN		James Madison	W 82–68	21–5 (13–2)	15 – Pearson	9 – Morrison	5 – Morrison	Patriot Center (9,480); Fairfax, VA
February 15, 2011; 7:00 pm, ESPNU		at VCU	W 71–51	22–5 (14–2)	18 – Pearson	8 – Hancock, Morrison, Pearson	7 – Hancock	Stuart C. Siegel Center (7,552); Richmond, VA
February 19, 2011*; 7:00 pm, ESPN2		at Northern Iowa; ESPN BracketBusters	W 77–71	23–5	24 – Cornelius	15 – Pearson	6 – Morrison	McLeod Center (6,580); Cedar Falls, IA
February 24, 2011; 7:00 pm, Comcast		Northeastern	W 67–61	24–5 (15–2)	18 – Pearson	15 – Pearson	3 – Hancock	Patriot Center (9,366); Fairfax, VA
February 26, 2011; 6:00 pm		at Georgia State	W 65–58	25–5 (16–2)	19 – Long	5 – Long, Morrison, Pearson	4 – Morrison	GSU Sports Arena (1,127); Atlanta, GA
CAA tournament
March 5, 2011; 12:00 pm, Comcast	(1) No. 25	vs. (9) Georgia State; Quarterfinals	W 68–45	26–5	15 – Long	6 – Pearson	4 – Morrison	Richmond Coliseum (7,814); Richmond, VA
March 6, 2011; 12:00 pm, Comcast	(1) No. 25	vs. (4) VCU; Semifinals	L 63–79	26–6	20 – Long	7 – Pearson	3 – Hancock	Richmond Coliseum (8,962); Richmond, VA
NCAA tournament
March 18, 2011*; 2:10 pm, TNT	(8 E)	vs. (9 E) Villanova; Second Round	W 61–57	27–6	18 – Hancock	11 – Morrison	5 – Hancock	Quicken Loans Arena (20,164); Cleveland, OH
March 20, 2011*; 5:15 pm, CBS	(8 E)	vs. (1 E) No. 1 Ohio State; Third Round	L 66–98	27–7	16 – Long	6 – Long	4 – Pearson	Quicken Loans Arena (20,164); Cleveland, OH
*Non-conference game. ^{#}Rankings from AP Poll. (#) Tournament seedings in parentheses. E=NCAA East Region. All times are in Eastern Time.

== Recruiting ==
The following is a list of players signed for the 2011–12 season:

College recruiting
Name	Hometown	School	Height	Weight	Commit date
Erik Copes; C	Philadelphia, PA	Imhotep Charter	6 ft 8 in (2.03 m)	220 lb (100 kg)	May 15, 2011
Erik Copes; C	Recruit ratings: Scout: Rivals: (95)				
Corey Edwards; PG	Middle Village, NY	Christ the King	6 ft 1 in (1.85 m)	155 lb (70 kg)	Oct 17, 2010
Corey Edwards; PG	Recruit ratings: (90)				
Vaughn Gray; SF	Elmwood Park, NJ	St. Benedict's Prep	6 ft 5 in (1.96 m)	200 lb (91 kg)	Oct 17, 2010
Vaughn Gray; SF	Recruit ratings: Scout: Rivals: (91)				
Overall recruit ranking:
Note: In many cases, Scout, Rivals, 247Sports, On3, and ESPN may conflict in their listings of height and weight.; In these cases, the average was taken. ESPN grades are on a 100-point scale.; Sources: "ESPN". ESPN.; "2011 Team Ranking". Rivals.
