= 2010–11 William & Mary Tribe men's basketball team =

American college basketball season

2010–11 William & Mary Tribe men's basketball
- Conference: Colonial Athletic Association
- Record: 10–22 (4–14 CAA)
- Head coach: Tony Shaver (8th season)
- Assistant coach: Jamion Christian
- Home arena: Kaplan Arena

2010–11 CAA men's basketball standings
	Conf.				Overall
Team	W		L	PCT	W		L	PCT
George Mason	16	–	2	.889	27	–	7	.794
Old Dominion †	14	–	4	.778	27	–	7	.794
Hofstra	14	–	4	.778	21	–	12	.636
VCU	12	–	6	.667	28	–	12	.700
Drexel	11	–	7	.611	21	–	10	.677
James Madison	10	–	8	.556	21	–	12	.636
Delaware	8	–	10	.444	14	–	17	.452
UNCW	7	–	11	.389	13	–	18	.419
Georgia State	6	–	12	.333	12	–	19	.387
Northeastern	6	–	12	.333	11	–	20	.355
William & Mary	4	–	14	.222	10	–	22	.313
Towson	0	–	18	.000	4	–	26	.133
† 2011 CAA tournament winner Rankings from AP poll

The 2010–11 William & Mary Tribe men's basketball team represented The College of William & Mary during the 2010–11 college basketball season. This was head coach Tony Shaver's eighth season at William & Mary. The Tribe competed in the Colonial Athletic Association and played their home games at Kaplan Arena. They finished the season 10–22, 4–14 in CAA play. They lost in the quarterfinal round of the CAA tournament to Hofstra. They did not participate in any post-season tournaments.
