= 2010–11 Drexel Dragons men's basketball team =

American college basketball season

2010–11 Drexel Dragons men's basketball
- Conference: Colonial Athletic Association
- Record: 21–10 (11–7 CAA)
- Head coach: Bruiser Flint (10th season)
- Assistant coaches: Mike Connors (3rd season); Ashley Howard (1st season); Matt Collier (1st season)
- MVP: Samme Givens
- Home arena: Daskalakis Athletic Center

2010–11 CAA men's basketball standings
	Conf.				Overall
Team	W		L	PCT	W		L	PCT
George Mason	16	–	2	.889	27	–	7	.794
Old Dominion †	14	–	4	.778	27	–	7	.794
Hofstra	14	–	4	.778	21	–	12	.636
VCU	12	–	6	.667	28	–	12	.700
Drexel	11	–	7	.611	21	–	10	.677
James Madison	10	–	8	.556	21	–	12	.636
Delaware	8	–	10	.444	14	–	17	.452
UNCW	7	–	11	.389	13	–	18	.419
Georgia State	6	–	12	.333	12	–	19	.387
Northeastern	6	–	12	.333	11	–	20	.355
William & Mary	4	–	14	.222	10	–	22	.313
Towson	0	–	18	.000	4	–	26	.133
† 2011 CAA tournament winner Rankings from AP poll

The 2010–11 Drexel Dragons men's basketball team represented Drexel University during the 2010–11 NCAA Division I men's basketball season. The Dragons, led by 10th year head coach Bruiser Flint, played their home games at the Daskalakis Athletic Center and were members of the Colonial Athletic Association.

== Roster ==
2010–11 Drexel Dragons men's basketball team
Players
Coaches

Pos.	#	Name	Height	Weight	Year	Previous school	Hometown
F	1	Yannick Formbor	6 ft 8 in (2.03 m)	245 lb (111 kg)	RS Sr	St. Patrick's	Roselle, NJ
G	3	Chris Fouch	6 ft 2 in (1.88 m)	170 lb (77 kg)	RS So	Rice	Bronx, NY
G	4	Frantz Massenat	6 ft 4 in (1.93 m)	180 lb (82 kg)	Fr	Trenton Catholic	Ewing, NJ
G	5	Stevan Manojlovic	6 ft 5 in (1.96 m)	190 lb (86 kg)	Fr	Martingrove Collegiate Institute	Toronto, Ontario
G	11	Gerald Colds	6 ft 1 in (1.85 m)	180 lb (82 kg)	Sr	St. Raymond's	New York, NY
G	15	Ronald Colbert	6 ft 2 in (1.88 m)	185 lb (84 kg)	Sr	Thomas Stone	Capitol Heights, MD
G	22	Jake Lerner (W)	6 ft 2 in (1.88 m)	190 lb (86 kg)	Fr	Abington Friends	Philadelphia, PA
G	32	Derrick Thomas	6 ft 4 in (1.93 m)	190 lb (86 kg)	So	St. John's College High School (D.C.)	New York, NY
F	33	Goran Pantovic	6 ft 10 in (2.08 m)	220 lb (100 kg)	Fr	Life Center Academy (N.J.)	Belgrade, Serbia
F	35	Dartaye Ruffin	6 ft 8 in (2.03 m)	240 lb (109 kg)	Fr	New Hampton	Stoughton, MA
F	44	Daryl McCoy	6 ft 9 in (2.06 m)	270 lb (122 kg)	So	Hartford Public	Hartford, CT
F	45	Samme Givens	6 ft 5 in (1.96 m)	220 lb (100 kg)	Jr	Academy of the New Church	Philadelphia, PA

Head coach

- James "Bruiser" Flint (Saint Joseph's)

Assistant coach(es)

- Mike Connors (Ithaca)
- Ashley Howard (Drexel)
- Matt Collier (UMass)

Legend

- (C) Team captain
- (S) Suspended
- (I) Ineligible
- (W) Walk-on
- Injured
- Current redshirt

Roster
Last update: April 15, 2014

== Schedule ==
Date time, TV	Rank^{#}	Opponent^{#}	Result	Record	Site city, state
Exhibition
August 23, 2010*		at Bornova Belediye	L 72–80		İzmir, Turkey
August 25, 2010*		at Karşıyaka	L 67–75		Karşıyaka, Turkey
August 27, 2010*		vs. Egypt U20	W 103–41		Istanbul, Turkey
August 29, 2010*		vs. Efes B-team	W 78–57		Istanbul, Turkey
Regular season
November 12, 2010*; 8:00 pm		at Loyola (MD)	W 75–72	1–0	Baltimore, MD
November 20, 2010*; 7:00 pm		at Penn; Battle of 33rd Street	W 77–56	2–0	Palestra; Philadelphia, PA
November 24, 2010*; 7:00 pm		at Rhode Island	L 68–74	2–1	Kingston, RI
November 28, 2010*; 7:00 pm		Binghamton	W 79–39	3–1	Daskalakis Athletic Center; Philadelphia, PA
December 1, 2010*; 7:00 pm, TCN		Saint Joseph's	W 62–50	4–1	Daskalakis Athletic Center (2,532); Philadelphia, PA
December 4, 2010; 4:00 pm, TCN		at Northeastern	W 63–58	5–1 (1–0)	Boston, Mass
December 11, 2010*; 4:00 pm		Rider	W 71–67 ^{OT}	6–1	Daskalakis Athletic Center; Philadelphia, PA
December 14, 2010*; 9:00 pm, ESPNU		at No. 20 Louisville	W 52–46	7–1	KFC Yum! Center (20,912); Louisville, KY
December 18, 2010*; 7:00 pm		at Saint Francis (PA)	W 61–57	8–1	Loretto, PA
December 22, 2010*; 7:00 pm	No. RV	at No. 5 Syracuse	L 65–93	8–2	Syracuse, NY
December 28, 2010*; 7:00 pm		Niagara	W 84–39	9–2	Daskalakis Athletic Center; Philadelphia, PA
January 3, 2011; 7:00 pm		Hofstra	L 69–75	9–3 (1–1)	Daskalakis Athletic Center; Philadelphia, PA
January 5, 2011; 7:00 pm, TCN		at VCU	L 48–52	9–4 (1–2)	Richmond, VA
January 8, 2011; 4:00 pm, TCN		Delaware	W 68–55	10–4 (2–2)	Daskalakis Athletic Center; Philadelphia, PA
January 13, 2011; 7:00 pm, ESPNU		Old Dominion	W 62–57	11–4 (3–2)	Daskalakis Athletic Center; Philadelphia, PA
January 15, 2011; 7:00 pm		at William & Mary	L 66–80	11–5 (3–3)	Williamsburg, VA
January 19, 2011; 9:00 pm, MASN		at George Mason	L 47–71	11–6 (3–4)	Fairfax, VA
January 22, 2011; 2:00 pm		Northeastern	W 72–58	12–6 (4–4)	Daskalakis Athletic Center; Philadelphia, PA
January 24, 2011; 7:00 pm		Georgia State	W 57–33	13–6 (5–4)	Daskalakis Athletic Center; Philadelphia, PA
January 26, 2011; 7:00 pm		at James Madison	L 52–60	13–7 (5–5)	Harrisonburg, VA
January 29, 2011; 4:00 pm		Hofstra	W 65–60	14–7 (6–5)	Hempstead, NY
February 2, 2011; 7:00 pm		Towson	W 65–59	15–7 (7–5)	Daskalakis Athletic Center; Philadelphia, PA
February 5, 2011; 8:00 pm, TCN		at Delaware	W 58–48	16–7 (8–5)	Newark, DE
February 9, 2011; 7:00 pm		James Madison	L 54–68	16–8 (8–6)	Daskalakis Athletic Center; Philadelphia, PA
February 12, 2011; 4:00 pm		William & Mary	W 54–52	17–8 (9–6)	Daskalakis Athletic Center; Philadelphia, PA
February 15, 2011; 7:00 pm		at UNC Wilmington	L 43–51	17–9 (9–7)	Wilmington, NC
February 18, 2011*; 9:00 pm, ESPNU		Kent State	W 73–66	18–9	Daskalakis Athletic Center; Philadelphia, PA
February 23, 2011; 7:00 pm		VCU	W 64–60	19–9 (10–7)	Daskalakis Athletic Center; Philadelphia, PA
February 26, 2011; 4:00 pm		at Towson	W 66–63	20–9 (11–7)	Towson, MD
CAA tournament
March 4, 2011; 2:30 pm	(5)	vs. (12) Towson; Quarterfinals	W 75–69	21–9	Richmond Coliseum; Richmond, VA
March 5, 2011; 2:30 pm, TCN	(5)	vs. (4) VCU; Semifinals	L 60–62	21–10	Richmond Coliseum; Richmond, VA
*Non-conference game. ^{#}Rankings from AP. (#) Tournament seedings in parentheses. All times are in Eastern Time.

Schedule source:

== Rankings ==
Ranking movement Legend: ██ Increase in ranking. ██ Decrease in ranking. ██ Not ranked the previous week. RV=Others receiving votes.
Poll	Pre	Wk 2	Wk 3	Wk 4	Wk 5	Wk 6	Wk 7	Wk 8	Wk 9	Wk 10	Wk 11	Wk 12	Wk 13	Wk 14	Wk 15	Wk 16	Wk 17	Wk 18	Post	Final
AP							RV													N/A
Coaches																				

== Awards ==
Gerald Colds

- CAA Player of the Week

Chris Fouch

- CAA All-Conference Third Team

Samme Givens

- CAA All-Conference Second Team

Frantz Massenat

- CAA All-Rookie Team

Dartaye Ruffin

- CAA All-Rookie Team
- CAA Rookie of the Week (5)
