= 2010–11 VCU Rams men's basketball team =

American college basketball season

2010–11 VCU Rams men's basketball

NCAA tournament, Final Four
- Conference: Colonial Athletic Association

Ranking
- Coaches: No. 6
- Record: 28–12 (12–6 CAA)
- Head coach: Shaka Smart (2nd season)
- Assistant coaches: Mike Jones; Mike Rhoades; Will Wade
- Home arena: Stuart C. Siegel Center

2010–11 CAA men's basketball standings
| | Conf. | | | | Overall |
| Team | W | | L | PCT | W | | L | PCT |
|---|---|---|---|---|---|---|---|---|
| George Mason | 16 | – | 2 | .889 | 27 | – | 7 | .794 |
| Old Dominion † | 14 | – | 4 | .778 | 27 | – | 7 | .794 |
| Hofstra | 14 | – | 4 | .778 | 21 | – | 12 | .636 |
| VCU | 12 | – | 6 | .667 | 28 | – | 12 | .700 |
| Drexel | 11 | – | 7 | .611 | 21 | – | 10 | .677 |
| James Madison | 10 | – | 8 | .556 | 21 | – | 12 | .636 |
| Delaware | 8 | – | 10 | .444 | 14 | – | 17 | .452 |
| UNCW | 7 | – | 11 | .389 | 13 | – | 18 | .419 |
| Georgia State | 6 | – | 12 | .333 | 12 | – | 19 | .387 |
| Northeastern | 6 | – | 12 | .333 | 11 | – | 20 | .355 |
| William & Mary | 4 | – | 14 | .222 | 10 | – | 22 | .313 |
| Towson | 0 | – | 18 | .000 | 4 | – | 26 | .133 |
† 2011 CAA tournament winner Rankings from AP poll

The 2010–11 VCU Rams men's basketball team represented Virginia Commonwealth University in the Colonial Athletic Association during the 2010–11 NCAA Division I men's basketball season. The Rams, led by second-year head coach Shaka Smart, played their home games at the Stuart C. Siegel Center in Richmond, Virginia.

The Rams finished the season 28–12, 12–6 in CAA play and lost in the conference championship game of the 2011 CAA tournament to Old Dominion. They received an at-large bid to the 2011 NCAA tournament, where they defeated eleventh-seed USC in the newly-established First Four round. In the main bracket, they defeated Georgetown and Purdue in the second and third rounds, respectively, to advance to the Sweet Sixteen. They defeated Florida State in overtime and advanced to the Elite Eight, where they defeated the first-seeded Kansas Jayhawks. They advanced to the school's first Final Four in team history, becoming the third 11th-seed in tournament history to advance to the Final Four, where they were defeated by the Butler Bulldogs. The VCU Rams finished 6th in the ESPN/USA Today Coaches Poll at the end of the season. This was the highest ranking in VCU's history and the highest ranking of any team from the CAA.

The 2011 NCAA tournament run by VCU is regarded by some as one of the best Cinderella runs of all time by winning five straight upsets to make it to the Final Four. They were the first men's Division I basketball team that played in the First Four to make it to the Final Four, and the first team in the tournament to win five games without qualifying for the national championship game, both feats which the UCLA Bruins duplicated in 2020–21.

== Roster ==
2010–11 VCU Rams men's basketball team
Players
Coaches

| Pos. | # | Name | Height | Weight | Year | Hometown |
|---|---|---|---|---|---|---|
| F | 5 | Juvonte Reddic | 6 ft 9 in (2.06 m) | 225 lb (102 kg) | Fr | Winston-Salem, NC |
| G | 10 | Darius Theus | 6 ft 3 in (1.91 m) | 190 lb (86 kg) | So | Portsmouth, VA |
| G | 12 | Joey Rodriguez | 5 ft 10 in (1.78 m) | 175 lb (79 kg) | Sr | Merritt Island, FL |
| G/F | 20 | Bradford Burgess | 6 ft 6 in (1.98 m) | 225 lb (102 kg) | Jr | Midlothian, VA |
| F | 21 | Jamie Skeen | 6 ft 9 in (2.06 m) | 240 lb (109 kg) | Sr | Charlotte, NC |
| G | 23 | Rob Brandenberg | 6 ft 2 in (1.88 m) | 180 lb (82 kg) | Fr | Gahanna, OH |
| F | 24 | Heath Houston | 6 ft 8 in (2.03 m) | 230 lb (104 kg) | Fr | Powder Springs, GA |
| G | 25 | Reco McCarter | 6 ft 7 in (2.01 m) | 190 lb (86 kg) | Fr | Goldsboro, NC |
| G | 30 | Troy Daniels | 6 ft 4 in (1.93 m) | 200 lb (91 kg) | So | Roanoke, VA |
| F | 31 | Toby Veal | 6 ft 8 in (2.03 m) | 235 lb (107 kg) | Jr | Savannah, GA |
| G | 32 | Brandon Rozzell | 6 ft 2 in (1.88 m) | 185 lb (84 kg) | Sr | Richmond, VA |
| C | 33 | D. J. Haley | 7 ft 0 in (2.13 m) | 250 lb (113 kg) | Fr | Palmdale, CA |
| F | 34 | David Hinton | 6 ft 9 in (2.06 m) | 235 lb (107 kg) | RS So | Winston-Salem, NC |
| G | 50 | Ed Nixon | 6 ft 4 in (1.93 m) | 210 lb (95 kg) | Sr | St. Petersburg, FL |

Head coach

Shaka Smart (Kenyon)

Assistant coach(es)

- Mike Jones
- Mike Rhoades
- Will Wade

Legend

- (C) Team captain
- (S) Suspended
- (I) Ineligible
- (W) Walk-on
- Injured
- Current redshirt

Roster
Last update: April 10, 2025

=== Recruiting ===
College recruiting
| Name | Hometown | School | Height | Weight | Commit date |
|---|---|---|---|---|---|
| Juvonte Reddic; C | Winston-Salem, North Carolina | Quality Education Academy | 6 ft 9 in (2.06 m) | 215 lb (98 kg) | Mar 22, 2010 |
| Juvonte Reddic; C | Recruit ratings: Scout: Rivals: (90) | | | | |
| Rob Brandenberg; SG | Gahanna, Ohio | Lincoln High School | 6 ft 2 in (1.88 m) | 170 lb (77 kg) | Aug 30, 2009 |
| Rob Brandenberg; SG | Recruit ratings: Scout: Rivals: (86) | | | | |
| D. J. Haley; C | Palmdale, California | Palmdale High School | 6 ft 10 in (2.08 m) | 230 lb (100 kg) | May 4, 2010 |
| D. J. Haley; C | Recruit ratings: Scout: Rivals: (78) | | | | |
| Reco McCarter; SF | Goldsboro, North Carolina | Wayne Country Day School | 6 ft 7 in (2.01 m) | 190 lb (86 kg) | Sep 29, 2009 |
| Reco McCarter; SF | Recruit ratings: Scout: Rivals: (91) | | | | |
| Heath Houston; PF | Powder Springs, Georgia | Hillgrove High School | 6 ft 7 in (2.01 m) | 225 lb (102 kg) | Jun 28, 2010 |
| Heath Houston; PF | Recruit ratings: Scout: Rivals: (83) | | | | |
| Toby Veal; SF | Savannah, Georgia | Northwest Florida State College | 6 ft 7 in (2.01 m) | 225 lb (102 kg) | Jan 17, 2010 |
| Toby Veal; SF | Recruit ratings: Scout: Rivals: (JC) | | | | |
Overall recruit ranking:
Note: In many cases, Scout, Rivals, 247Sports, On3, and ESPN may conflict in their listings of height and weight.; In these cases, the average was taken. ESPN grades are on a 100-point scale.; Sources: "VCU 2012 Basketball Commitments". Rivals.; "2012 VCU Basketball Commits". Scout.; "ESPN". ESPN.; "Scout.com Team Recruiting Rankings". Scout.; "2012 Team Ranking". Rivals.

== Preseason ==
VCU was predicted to finish third in the Colonial Athletic Association preseason polls, which were released on October 19, 2010 in Arlington, Virginia. Senior guard Joey Rodriguez was selected to the preseason CAA first-team honors.

== Schedule ==
| Date time, TV | Rank^{#} | Opponent^{#} | Result | Record | High points | High rebounds | High assists | Site (attendance) city, state |
Exhibition
| Nov. 4, 2010*; 7:30 pm | | Virginia Union | W 71–56 | — | 10 – Tied | 8 – Skeen | 5 – Theus | Stuart C. Siegel Center (6,645); Richmond, Virginia |
Regular season
| Nov. 12, 2010*; 7:30 pm | | UNC Greensboro | W 101–86 | 1–0 | 23 – Rozzell | 7 – Skeen | 17 – Rodriguez | Stuart C. Siegel Center (7,094); Richmond, VA |
| Nov. 15, 2010*; 9:30 pm | | vs. Winthrop; NIT Season Tip-Off first round | W 67–54 | 2–0 | 15 – Rodriguez | 8 – Skeen | 8 – Rodriguez | LJVM Coliseum (1,276); Winston-Salem, NC |
| Nov. 16, 2010*; 7:00 pm | | at Wake Forest; NIT Season Tip-Off Quarterfinals | W 90–69 | 3–0 | 25 – Burgess | 8 – Burgess | 6 – Rodriguez | LJVM Coliseum (8,119); Winston-Salem, NC |
| Nov. 24, 2010*; 7:00 pm, ESPN2 | | vs. No. 24 Tennessee; NIT Season Tip-Off Semifinals | L 72–77 | 3–1 | 23 – Rozzell | 14 – Skeen | 4 – Rozzell | Madison Square Garden (10,912); New York, NY |
| Nov. 26, 2010*; 7:00 pm, ESPN2 | | vs. UCLA; NIT Season Tip-Off 3rd place game | W 89–85 | 4–1 | 23 – Skeen | 9 – Skeen | 5 – Rodriguez | Madison Square Garden (10,292); New York, NY |
| Dec. 1, 2010*; 7:00 pm | | at South Florida | L 59–60 ^{OT} | 4–2 | 16 – Skeen | 13 – Burgess | 3 – Rozzell | USF Sun Dome (2,921); Tampa, FL |
| Dec. 4, 2010; 12:00 pm | | William & Mary | W 59–55 | 5–2 (1–0) | 13 – Rodriguez | 7 – Skeen | 3 – Rodriguez | Stuart C. Siegel Center (6,482); Richmond, VA |
| Dec. 8, 2010*; 7:30 pm | | VMI | W 86–80 | 6–2 | 19 – Skeen | 10 – Veal | 6 – Theus | Stuart C. Siegel Center (6,023); Richmond, VA |
| Dec. 11, 2010*; 7:00 pm | | at Richmond; Capital City Classic | L 60–72 | 6–3 | 14 – Skeen | 10 – Skeen | 3 – Rodriguez | Robins Center (8,906); Richmond, VA |
| Dec. 18, 2010*; 2:00 pm | | Tulane | W 70–67 | 7–3 | 15 – Skeen | 6 – Skeen | 5 – Theus | Stuart C. Siegel Center (5,734); Richmond, VA |
| Dec. 21, 2010*; 8:00 pm | | at UAB | L 65–68 | 7–4 | 26 – Burgess | 10 – Skeen | 4 – Theus | Bartow Arena (4,344); Birmingham, AL |
| Dec. 29, 2010*; 7:00 pm | | Wofford; Holidays on the Hardwood Classic | W 75–66 | 8–4 | 18 – Rozzell | 8 – Skeen | 4 – Theus | Stuart C. Siegel Center (5,799); Richmond, VA |
| Dec. 30, 2010*; 7:30 pm | | New Hampshire; Holidays on the Hardwood Classic | W 78–65 | 9–4 | 24 – Burgess | 8 – Burgess | 8 – Rodriguez | Stuart C. Siegel Center (5,590); Richmond, VA |
| Jan. 3, 2011; 7:00 pm | | at Georgia State | L 66–76 | 9–5 (1–1) | 16 – Skeen | 4 – Skeen | 3 – Theus | GSU Sports Arena (852); Atlanta, GA |
| Jan. 5, 2011; 7:00 pm | | Drexel | W 52–48 | 10–5 (2–1) | 11 – Burgess | 8 – Burgess | 5 – Rodriguez | Stuart C. Siegel Center (6,313); Richmond, VA |
| Jan. 8, 2011; 7:00 pm | | at UNC Wilmington | W 82–64 | 11–5 (3–1) | 22 – Rozzell | 8 – Burgess | 6 – Rodriguez | Trask Coliseum (5,126); Wilmington, NC |
| Jan. 12, 2011; 7:00 pm | | at William & Mary | W 70–52 | 12–5 (4–1) | 22 – Brandenberg | 12 – Skeen | 6 – Theus | Kaplan Arena (2,245); Williamsburg, VA |
| Jan. 15, 2011; 12:00 pm | | Northeastern | W 73–64 | 13–5 (5–1) | 26 – Burgess | 9 – Burgess | 7 – Rodriguez | Stuart C. Siegel Center (6,042); Richmond, VA |
| Jan. 19, 2011; 7:30 pm | | Georgia State | W 71–54 | 14–5 (6–1) | 23 – Brandenberg | 7 – Skeen | 6 – Rodriguez | Stuart C. Siegel Center (6,531); Richmond, VA |
| Jan. 22, 2011; 4:00 pm | | at Old Dominion; ODU rivalry | W 59–50 | 15–5 (7–1) | 15 – Burgess | 10 – Skeen | 5 – Skeen | Ted Constant Convocation Center (8,457); Norfolk, VA |
| Jan. 24, 2011; 7:00 pm | | at Towson | W 80–76 | 16–5 (8–1) | 28 – Rodriguez | 5 – Burgess | 5 – Nixon | Towson Center (1,365); Towson, MD |
| Jan. 27, 2011; 7:00 pm | | Hofstra | W 82–67 | 17–5 (9–1) | 18 – Skeen | 14 – Burgess | 6 – Nixon | Stuart C. Siegel Center (7,208); Richmond, VA |
| Jan. 29, 2011; 7:30 pm | | UNC Wilmington | W 79–70 | 18–5 (10–1) | 25 – Rodriguez | 8 – Burgess | 7 – Theus | Stuart C. Siegel Center (7,552); Richmond, VA |
| Feb. 2, 2011; 7:00 pm | | at Northeastern | L 80–91 | 18–6 (10–2) | 18 – Rodriguez | 9 – Skeen | 5 – Nixon | Matthews Arena (1,095); Boston, MA |
| Feb. 5, 2011; 2:00 pm | | at James Madison | W 70–66 | 19–6 (11–2) | 22 – Burgess | 7 – Nixon | 5 – Rodriguez | JMU Convocation Center (4,989); Harrisonburg, VA |
| Feb. 9, 2011; 7:00 pm | | at Delaware | W 84–74 ^{2OT} | 20–6 (12–2) | 32 – Skeen | 11 – Skeen | 3 – Nixon | Bob Carpenter Center (2,471); Newark, DE |
| Feb. 12, 2011; 7:00 pm | | Old Dominion; ODU rivalry | L 59–70 | 20–7 (12–3) | 15 – Rozzell | 7 – Skeen | 4 – Rozzell | Stuart C. Siegel Center (7,552); Richmond, VA |
| Feb. 15, 2011; 7:00 pm, ESPNU | | George Mason; George Mason rivalry | L 51–71 | 20–8 (12–4) | 12 – Brandenberg | 8 – Rodriguez | 3 – Skeen | Stuart C. Siegel Center (7,552); Richmond, VA |
| Feb. 18, 2011*; 7:00 pm, ESPN2 | | at Wichita State; ESPN BracketBusters | W 68–67 | 21–8 | 17 – Burgess | 12 – Skeen | 11 – Rodriguez | Charles Koch Arena (10,506); Wichita, KS |
| Feb. 23, 2011; 7:00 pm | | at Drexel | L 60–64 | 21–9 (12–5) | 17 – Skeen | 7 – Burgess | 3 – Burgess | Daskalakis Athletic Center (2,073); Philadelphia, PA |
| Feb. 26, 2011; 12:00 pm | | James Madison | L 69–72 | 21–10 (12–6) | 20 – Skeen | 8 – Nixon | 10 – Rodriguez | Stuart C. Siegel Center (7,552); Richmond, VA |
CAA tournament
| Mar. 5, 2011; 2:30 pm, CSN | (4) | vs. (5) Drexel; Quarterfinals | W 62–60 | 22–10 | 24 – Skeen | 8 – Skeen | 5 – Rodriguez | Richmond Coliseum (7,814); Richmond, VA |
| Mar. 6, 2011; 12:00 pm, CSN | (4) | vs. (1) No. 25 George Mason; Semifinals | W 79–63 | 23–10 | 21 – Skeen | 13 – Burgess | 5 – Nixon | Richmond Coliseum (8,962); Richmond, VA |
| Mar. 7, 2011; 7:00 pm, ESPN | (4) | vs. (2) Old Dominion; Championship Game | L 65–70 | 23–11 | 19 – Burgess | 8 – Burgess | 7 – Rodriguez | Richmond Coliseum (11,200); Richmond, VA |
NCAA tournament
| Mar. 16, 2011*; 9:00 pm, truTV | (11 SW) | vs. (11 SW) USC; First Four | W 59–46 | 24–11 | 16 – Skeen | 10 – Burgess | 5 – Rodriguez | University of Dayton Arena (10,192); Dayton, OH |
| Mar. 18, 2011*; 9:50 pm, TNT | (11 SW) | vs. (6 SW) Georgetown; Second Round | W 74–56 | 25–11 | 26 – Rozzell | 8 – Burgess | 7 – Rodriguez | United Center (17,369); Chicago, IL |
| Mar. 20, 2011*; 7:10 pm, TBS | (11 SW) | vs. (3 SW) No. 13 Purdue; Third Round | W 94–76 | 26–11 | 23 – Burgess | 8 – Burgess | 11 – Rodriguez | United Center (18,146); Chicago, IL |
| Mar. 25, 2011*; 9:57 pm, TBS | (11 SW) | vs. (10 SW) Florida State; Sweet Sixteen | W 72–71 ^{OT} | 27–11 | 26 – Burgess | 8 – D | 10 – Rodriguez | Alamodome (14,566); San Antonio, TX |
| Mar. 27, 2011*; 2:20 pm, CBS | (11 SW) | vs. (1 SW) No. 2 Kansas; Elite Eight | W 71–61 | 28–11 | 26 – Skeen | 10 – Skeen | 5 – Rodriguez | Alamodome (14,738); San Antonio, TX |
| Apr. 2, 2011*; 6:09 pm, CBS | (11 SW) | vs. (8 SE) Butler; Final Four | L 62–70 | 28–12 | 27 – Skeen | 9 – Burgess | 8 – Rodriguez | Reliant Stadium (75,421); Houston, TX |
*Non-conference game. ^{#}Rankings from AP Poll. (#) Tournament seedings in parentheses. SE=NCAA Southeast Regional. SW=NCAA Southwest Regional. All times are in Eastern Time.

== Honors ==
Senior forward Jamie Skeen was named the Southwest Regional Most Outstanding Player. Skeen was also named to 2nd team All- Colonial Athletic Association. Senior guard Joey Rodriguez was named to 3rd team All-Colonial Athletic Association.
