= 2011 CAA men's basketball tournament =

- Classification: Division I
- Season: 2010–11
- Teams: 12
- Site: Richmond Coliseum; Richmond, VA
- Champions: Old Dominion Monarchs (8th title)
- Winning coach: Blaine Taylor (3rd title)
- MVP: Frank Hassell (Old Dominion)
- Television: Comcast SportsNet; ESPN

The 2011 CAA men's basketball tournament was held March 4–7 at the Richmond Coliseum in Richmond, VA to crown a champion of the Colonial Athletic Association. Old Dominion, the runner up in the regular season, beat the fourth seeded VCU in the final taking them into the NCAA tournament with conferences automatic bid. Old Dominion, George Mason, and VCU each participated in the NCAA tournament, with George Mason and VCU receiving at large bids.

2010–11 CAA men's basketball standings
	Conf.				Overall
Team	W		L	PCT	W		L	PCT
George Mason	16	–	2	.889	27	–	7	.794
Old Dominion †	14	–	4	.778	27	–	7	.794
Hofstra	14	–	4	.778	21	–	12	.636
VCU	12	–	6	.667	28	–	12	.700
Drexel	11	–	7	.611	21	–	10	.677
James Madison	10	–	8	.556	21	–	12	.636
Delaware	8	–	10	.444	14	–	17	.452
UNCW	7	–	11	.389	13	–	18	.419
Georgia State	6	–	12	.333	12	–	19	.387
Northeastern	6	–	12	.333	11	–	20	.355
William & Mary	4	–	14	.222	10	–	22	.313
Towson	0	–	18	.000	4	–	26	.133
† 2011 CAA tournament winner Rankings from AP poll

== Bracket ==
First round Friday, March 4, 2011
8	UNC Wilmington	52
9	Georgia State	58
5	Drexel	75
12	Towson	69
7	Delaware	60
10	Northeastern	58
6	James Madison	68
11	William & Mary	72

Quarterfinals; Saturday, March 5, 2011
1	George Mason	68
9	Georgia State	45
4	VCU	62
5	Drexel	60
2	Old Dominion	59
7	Delaware	50
3	Hofstra	72
11	William & Mary	56

Semifinals; Sunday, March 6, 2011
1	George Mason	63
4	VCU	79
2	Old Dominion	77
3	Hofstra	69

Championship Game; Monday, March 7, 2011
4	VCU	65
2	Old Dominion	70

== Honors ==
CAA All-Tournament Team	Player	School	Position	Year
CAA All-Tournament Team	Kent Bazemore	Old Dominion	Guard/Forward	Junior
CAA All-Tournament Team	Bradford Burgess	VCU	Guard	Junior
CAA All-Tournament Team	Frank Hassell	Old Dominion	Forward	Senior
CAA All-Tournament Team	Charles Jenkins	Hofstra	Guard	Senior
CAA All-Tournament Team	Cam Long	George Mason	Guard	Senior
CAA All-Tournament Team	Jamie Skeen	VCU	Forward	Senior

== See also ==
- Colonial Athletic Association
- 2010–11 Colonial Athletic Association men's basketball season
