= Mo Cassara =

American basketball player and coach

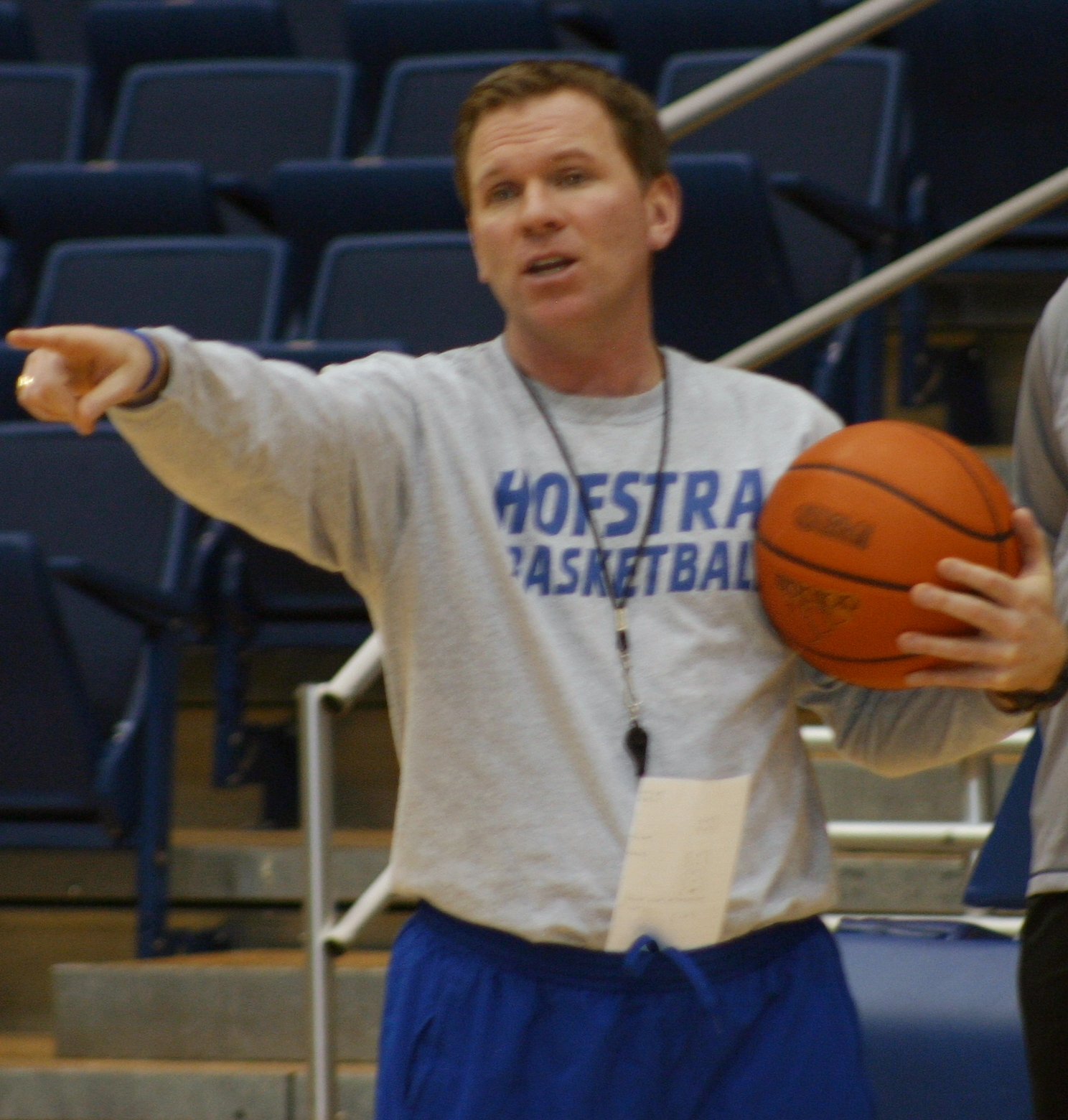

Biographical details
- Born: July 10, 1973 (age 53); Canton, New York, U.S.

Playing career
- 1993–1997: St. Lawrence

Coaching career (HC unless noted)
- 1997–1998: Washington and Lee (assistant)
- 1998–1999: The Citadel (assistant)
- 1999–2003: Worcester Academy
- 2004–2006: Clark
- 2006–2010: Boston College (assistant)
- 2010–2013: Hofstra

Head coaching record
- Overall: 38–59

Richard Morgan "Mo" Cassara (born July 10, 1973) is an American basketball coach and was Hofstra University's men's head coach from 2010–2013. Cassara was named head coach on May 5, 2010, agreeing to a multi-year deal with the university

Cassara is a graduate of Berkshire School, Worcester Academy, St. Lawrence University and holds a Masters degree from Boston College in Education and Higher Administration. He previously served as the head coach at Worcester Academy and Clark University. In addition, he was an assistant coach at the University of Dayton and Boston College.

Cassara now works for CBS SportsNetwork as a college basketball analyst. 2025 will be Cassara's 10th season covering the Patriot League for CBS and he has also worked across other broadcasting networks with Westwood One, ESPN, and others. Cassara owns MO'NELISA Italian restaurant and Pizzeria in Point Lookout, NY- He is married to News 12 reporter Elisa DiStefano. They have 3 children, Christian, Elena, and Anthony.
