= Frank Hassell =

American basketball player (born 1988)

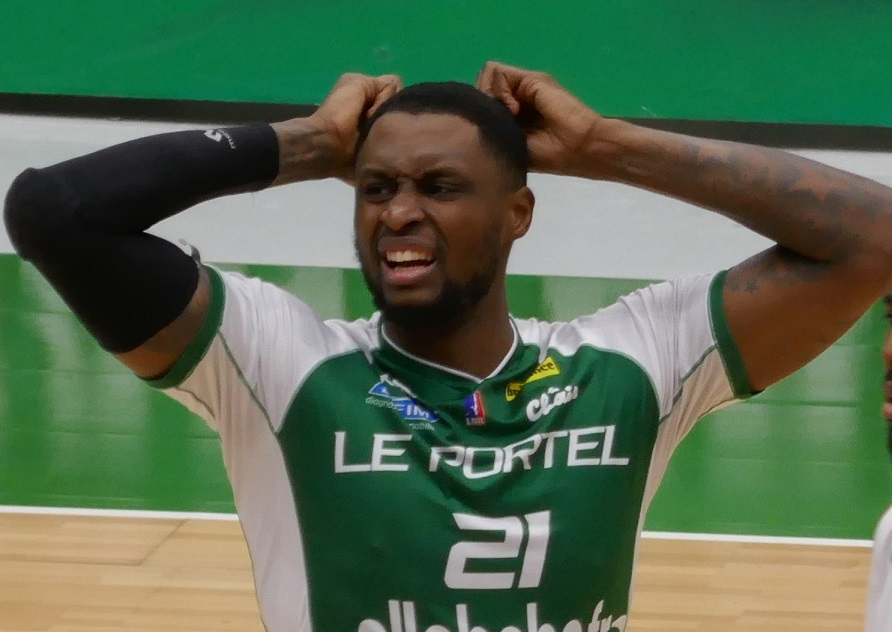
- Hassell with Le Portel in 2017

Personal information
- Born: October 9, 1988 (age 38) Chesapeake, Virginia, U.S.
- Listed height: 6 ft 8 in (2.03 m)
- Listed weight: 235 lb (107 kg)

Career information
- High school: Indian River (Chesapeake, Virginia)
- College: Old Dominion (2007–2011)
- NBA draft: 2011: undrafted
- Playing career: 2011–2024
- Position: Power forward / center

Career history
- 2011: Banvit
- 2011–2012: Canton Charge
- 2012–2013: Hapoel Holon
- 2013–2014: Varese
- 2014–2015: Bnei Herzliya
- 2015–2016: Boulazac Dordogne
- 2016–2018: Le Portel
- 2018–2019: Cholet
- 2019–2020: Le Portel
- 2020: Boulazac Dordogne
- 2020–2021: Elitzur Yavne B.C.
- 2023–2024: Hebraica Macabi

Career highlights
- EuroChallenge scoring leader (2013); EuroChallenge rebounding leader (2013); Israeli League rebounding leader (2013); LNB Pro B Best Scorer (2016); First-team All-CAA (2011); CAA All-Defensive Team (2011); CAA tournament MVP (2011)

Franklin Hassell (born October 9, 1988) is an American professional basketball player for Mineros de Zacatecas of the Mexican League. Standing at 6 ft 8 in (2.03 m), he plays as a power forward. In 2012–13, he was the top rebounder in the Israel Basketball Premier League.

== Career ==
Hassell competed in college for Old Dominion. As a senior he averaged 15 points and 9.4 rebounds per game for a team that went 27–7. He was named to the All-CAA First Team. After graduation he played for different teams in Israel, Italy and Turkey.

In 2012–13, he was the top rebounder in the Israel Basketball Premier League.

In 2015–16, Hassell played for Boulazac Dordogne, where he led the league in scoring with 18.4 points per game, and was second in rebounding, at 10.1 per contest.

In July 2018, Hassell competed in The Basketball Tournament for Monarch Nation, a team composed of Old Dominion alumni. The team lost to Overseas Elite in the second round.

On August 2, 2018, he signed a one-year contract with Polish club Stelmet Zielona Góra. However, he left the team in training camp. He signed with Cholet Basket on October 2, 2018. He conducted an interview about his Cholet experience with the Juneau Empire. https://www.juneauempire.com/life/different-vibe-us-basketball-player-talks-playing-for-france-team/

On July 6, 2019, Hassell returned to Le Portel.

On January 15, 2020, he has signed with Boulazac Basket Dordogne of the LNB Pro A. On December 26, 2021, Hassell signed with VEF Rīga of the Latvian–Estonian Basketball League.

=== The Basketball Tournament ===
Frank Hassell played for Team Monarch Nation in the 2018 edition of The Basketball Tournament. He averaged team-highs in points (12.5) and rebounds (10.5) per game and shot 83 percent from the free-throw line. Team Monarch Nation reached the second round before falling to eventual champions Overseas Elite.
