= 2011 NCAA Division I men's basketball tournament =

Edition of USA college basketball tournament

- Teams: 68
- Finals site: Reliant Stadium, Houston, Texas
- Champions: Connecticut Huskies (3rd title, 3rd title game, 4th Final Four)
- Runner-up: Butler Bulldogs (2nd title game, 2nd Final Four)
- Semifinalists: Kentucky Wildcats (14th Final Four); VCU Rams (1st Final Four)
- Winning coach: Jim Calhoun (3rd title)
- MOP: Kemba Walker (Connecticut)

The 2011 NCAA Division I men's basketball tournament involved 68 teams playing in a single-elimination tournament that determined the National Collegiate Athletic Association (NCAA) Division I men's basketball national champion for the 2010-11 season. The 73rd edition of the NCAA tournament began on March 15, 2011, and concluded with the championship game on April 4, at Reliant Stadium in Houston, Texas. This tournament marked the introduction of the "First Four" round and an expansion of the field of participants from 65 teams to 68. Due to the geographical location of New Orleans and San Antonio, the "South" and "Midwest" regional games were replaced for this tournament by the monikers "Southeast" and "Southwest", respectively.

The Final Four featured no top seeds for the first time since 2006, with the highest remaining seed being West Region winner, #3 Connecticut. For the first time since 2000, a #8 seed advanced to the Final Four as Butler, the national runner-up from the year before, won the Southeast Region. For only the third time ever, a #11 seed advanced to the Final Four as Virginia Commonwealth, one of the "First Four" teams, won the Southwest Region. Those three teams were joined by East Region champion Kentucky, a #4 seed. This was also the first Final Four to not feature any 1-seed or 2-seeds. The Final Four had the highest combined Final Four seeds since seeding started in 1979, with 26 (11-VCU, 8-Butler, 4-Kentucky & 3-Connecticut). Connecticut defeated Butler in the championship game 53–41, winning its third national championship in as many attempts.

Upsets ruled the 2011 tournament. The East Region saw its #11 seed, Marquette, advance to the Sweet Sixteen where they were downed by North Carolina. The Southwest Region saw four of its double digit seeds win, as VCU was joined by #12 seed and city mate Richmond, #10 seed Florida State, and #13 seed Morehead State as first round winners. Florida State, VCU, and Richmond all advanced to the Sweet Sixteen from that region, and VCU defeated top-seeded Kansas in the final. Butler and #11 seed Gonzaga advanced from the Southeast Region, with Gonzaga losing in the Round of 32 to BYU.

For the third time in as many appearances, Vanderbilt suffered a defeat to a double digit seed. This time, they were defeated by Richmond as a #5 seed.

The Big East had 11 teams make the tournament. Due to having more than eight teams qualify, it was possible for intra-Big East matchups to occur in the third round. Two of these matchups did occur as Marquette defeated Syracuse in the East while Connecticut defeated Cincinnati in the West. The other Big East teams to qualify were Pittsburgh, who earned the #1 seed in the Southeast Region and were knocked out in the third round by Butler, St. John's, who were the Southeast's #6 seed and were eliminated in their first game by Gonzaga, Louisville, which earned the #4 seed in the Southwest and fell to Morehead State in their first game, Georgetown, who lost to VCU in the first round as a #6 in the Southwest, Notre Dame, the #2 seed in the Southwest who were eliminated by Florida State, Villanova, who were eliminated in an #8 vs #9 matchup against George Mason in the East Region, and West Virginia, the East's #5 seed who lost in the third round to Kentucky.

This was the last NCAA men's tournament to date in which a mid-major conference saw multiple teams reach the Sweet 16, as both BYU and San Diego State did from the Mountain West Conference.

Northern Colorado, winners of the Big Sky Conference, made its first NCAA Division I tournament.

== Tournament procedure ==
For the first time, a total of 68 teams entered the tournament. Thirty of the thirty-one automatic bids were given to the programs that won their conference tournaments, while the remaining automatic bid went to the Ivy League champion Princeton, as the conference does not hold a tournament. The remaining 37 teams were granted "at-large" bids, which are extended by the NCAA Selection Committee. All 68 teams were announced on "Selection Sunday" March 13, 2011.

The Selection Committee ranked the entire field from 1 to 68. The last four at-large teams selected and the four lowest ranked automatic qualifiers played in a "First Four". The four winners of those games advanced to the main draw of the tournament to play a higher seed. The four lowest ranked teams of the 68 played against each other in a pair of First Four games, with winners advancing to play No. 1 seeds, and the last four at-large teams played in the other two First Four games, with the winners moving on to face the seed they would otherwise be matched up against, as determined by their seed number.

== Schedule and venues ==
2011 First Four (orange), and first and second rounds (green)
2011 Regionals (blue) and Final Four (red)

The following sites were selected to host each round of the 2011 tournament:

First Four

- March 15 and 16
  - University of Dayton Arena, Dayton, Ohio (Host: University of Dayton)

First and Second rounds

- March 17 and 19
  - Verizon Center, Washington, D.C. (Host: Georgetown University)
  - McKale Center, Tucson, Arizona (Host: University of Arizona)
  - Pepsi Center, Denver, Colorado (Host: Mountain West Conference)
  - Tampa Bay Times Forum, Tampa, Florida (Host: University of South Florida)
- March 18 and 20
  - Quicken Loans Arena, Cleveland, Ohio (Host: Cleveland State University)
  - Time Warner Cable Arena, Charlotte, North Carolina (Host: University of North Carolina at Charlotte)
  - United Center, Chicago, Illinois (Host: Big Ten Conference)
  - BOK Center, Tulsa, Oklahoma (Host: University of Tulsa)

Regional semifinals and Finals (Sweet Sixteen and Elite Eight)

- March 24 and 26
  - West Regional
    - Honda Center, Anaheim, California (Host: Big West Conference)
  - Southeast Regional
    - New Orleans Arena, New Orleans, Louisiana (Host: Tulane University)
- March 25 and 27
  - Southwest Regional
    - Alamodome, San Antonio, Texas (Host: University of Texas at San Antonio)
  - East Regional
    - Prudential Center, Newark, New Jersey (Host: Seton Hall University)

National semifinals and championship (Final Four and championship)

- April 2 and 4
  - Reliant Stadium, Houston, Texas (Hosts: University of Houston, Rice University)

== Qualified teams ==

=== Automatic bids ===
The following teams were automatic qualifiers for the 2011 NCAA field by virtue of winning their conference's tournament (except for the Ivy League, whose regular-season champion received the automatic bid).

Conference	School	Appearance	Last bid
ACC	Duke	35th	2010
America East	Boston University	7th	2002
Atlantic 10	Richmond	9th	2010
Atlantic Sun	Belmont	4th	2008
Big 12	Kansas	40th	2010
Big East	Connecticut	29th	2009
Big Sky	Northern Colorado	1st	Never
Big South	UNC Asheville	2nd	2003
Big Ten	Ohio State	27th	2010
Big West	UC Santa Barbara	5th	2010
Colonial	Old Dominion	11th	2010
C-USA	Memphis	23rd	2009
Horizon	Butler	11th	2010
Ivy League	Princeton	24th	2004
MAAC	Saint Peter's	3rd	1995
MAC	Akron	3rd	2009
MEAC	Hampton	4th	2006
Missouri Valley	Indiana State	4th	2001
Mountain West	San Diego State	7th	2010
Northeast	Long Island	4th	1997
Ohio Valley	Morehead State	7th	2009
Pac-10	Washington	16th	2010
Patriot	Bucknell	5th	2006
SEC	Kentucky	51st	2010
Southern	Wofford	2nd	2010
Southland	UTSA	4th	2004
Summit	Oakland	3rd	2010
SWAC	Alabama State	4th	2009
Sun Belt	Arkansas–Little Rock	4th	1990
WAC	Utah State	20th	2010
West Coast	Gonzaga	14th	2010

== Tournament seeds (list by region) ==
East Regional – Newark, New Jersey
Seed	School	Conference	Record	Berth type	Last bid
1	Ohio State	Big Ten	32–2	Automatic	2010
2	North Carolina	ACC	26–7	At-large	2009
3	Syracuse	Big East	26–7	At-large	2010
4	Kentucky	SEC	25–8	Automatic	2010
5	West Virginia	Big East	20–11	At-large	2010
6	Xavier	Atlantic 10	24–7	At-large	2010
7	Washington	Pac-10	23–10	Automatic	2010
8	George Mason	CAA	26–6	At-large	2008
9	Villanova	Big East	21–11	At-large	2010
10	Georgia	SEC	21–11	At-large	2008
11	Marquette	Big East	20–14	At-large	2010
12*	UAB	C-USA	22–8	At-large	2006
12*	Clemson	ACC	21–11	At-large	2010
13	Princeton	Ivy League	25–6	Automatic	2004
14	Indiana State	Missouri Valley	20–13	Automatic	2001
15	Long Island	Northeast	27–5	Automatic	1997
16*	UTSA	Southland	19–13	Automatic	2004
16*	Alabama State	SWAC	17–17	Automatic	2009

Southwest Regional – San Antonio, Texas
Seed	School	Conference	Record	Berth type	Last bid
1	Kansas	Big 12	32–2	Automatic	2010
2	Notre Dame	Big East	26–6	At-large	2010
3	Purdue	Big Ten	25–7	At-large	2010
4	Louisville	Big East	25–9	At-large	2010
5	Vanderbilt	SEC	23–10	At-large	2010
6	Georgetown	Big East	21–10	At-large	2010
7	Texas A&M	Big 12	24–8	At-large	2010
8	UNLV	Mountain West	24–8	At-large	2010
9	Illinois	Big Ten	19–13	At-large	2009
10	Florida State	ACC	21–10	At-large	2010
11*	USC	Pac-10	19–14	At-large	2009
11*	VCU	CAA	23–11	At-large	2009
12	Richmond	Atlantic 10	27–7	Automatic	2010
13	Morehead State	Ohio Valley	24–9	Automatic	2009
14	Saint Peter's	MAAC	20–13	Automatic	1995
15	Akron	MAC	23–12	Automatic	2009
16	Boston University	America East	21–13	Automatic	2002

Southeast Regional – New Orleans, Louisiana
Seed	School	Conference	Record	Berth type	Last bid
1	Pittsburgh	Big East	27–5	At-large	2010
2	Florida	SEC	26–7	At-large	2010
3	BYU	Mountain West	30–4	At-large	2010
4	Wisconsin	Big Ten	23–8	At-large	2010
5	Kansas State	Big 12	22–10	At-large	2010
6	St. John's	Big East	21–11	At-large	2002
7	UCLA	Pac-10	22–10	At-large	2009
8	Butler	Horizon	23–9	Automatic	2010
9	Old Dominion	CAA	27–6	Automatic	2010
10	Michigan State	Big Ten	19–14	At-large	2010
11	Gonzaga	West Coast	24–9	Automatic	2010
12	Utah State	WAC	30–3	Automatic	2010
13	Belmont	Atlantic Sun	30–4	Automatic	2008
14	Wofford	Southern	21–12	Automatic	2010
15	UC Santa Barbara	Big West	18–13	Automatic	2010
16*	UNC Asheville	Big South	19–13	Automatic	2003
16*	Arkansas–Little Rock	Sun Belt	19–16	Automatic	1990

West Regional – Anaheim, California
Seed	School	Conference	Record	Berth type	Last bid
1	Duke	ACC	30–4	Automatic	2010
2	San Diego State	Mountain West	32–2	Automatic	2010
3	Connecticut	Big East	26–9	Automatic	2009
4	Texas	Big 12	27–7	At-large	2010
5	Arizona	Pac-10	27–7	At-large	2009
6	Cincinnati	Big East	25–8	At-large	2005
7	Temple	Atlantic 10	25–7	At-large	2010
8	Michigan	Big Ten	20–13	At-large	2009
9	Tennessee	SEC	19–14	At-large	2010
10	Penn State	Big Ten	19–14	At-large	2001
11	Missouri	Big 12	23–10	At-large	2010
12	Memphis	C-USA	25–9	Automatic	2009
13	Oakland	Summit	25–9	Automatic	2010
14	Bucknell	Patriot	25–8	Automatic	2006
15	Northern Colorado	Big Sky	21–10	Automatic	Never
16	Hampton	MEAC	24–8	Automatic	2006

*See First Four.

== Bracket ==
Unless otherwise noted, all times listed are Eastern Daylight Time (UTC−04)

=== First Four – Dayton, Ohio ===
The First Four games involved eight teams: the four overall lowest-ranked teams, and the four lowest-ranked at-large teams.

All games on truTV. First Four winners enter the second round as their respective seed and in their respective region.

East No. 16 seeds March 16
16	UTSA	70
16	Alabama State	61

East No. 12 seeds March 15
12	Clemson	70
12	UAB	52

Southeast No. 16 seeds March 15
16	UNC-Asheville	81^{OT}
16	Arkansas-Little Rock	77

Southwest No. 11 seeds March 16
11	VCU	59
11	USC	46

=== East Regional – Newark, New Jersey ===
First round March 17–18
1	Ohio State	75
16	UTSA	46
Cleveland – Fri/Sun
8	George Mason	61
9	Villanova	57
5	West Virginia	84
12	Clemson	76
Tampa – Thu/Sat
4	Kentucky	59
13	Princeton	57
6	Xavier	55
11	Marquette	66
Cleveland – Fri/Sun
3	Syracuse	77
14	Indiana State	60
7	Washington	68
10	Georgia	65
Charlotte – Fri/Sun
2	North Carolina	102
15	Long Island	87

Second round March 19–20
1	Ohio State	98
8	George Mason	66
5	West Virginia	63
4	Kentucky	71
11	Marquette	66
3	Syracuse	62
7	Washington	83
2	North Carolina	86

Regional semifinals – Sweet 16; March 25
1	Ohio State	60
4	Kentucky	62
11	Marquette	63
2	North Carolina	81

Regional finals – Elite 8 March 27
4	Kentucky	76
2	North Carolina	69

==== Regional Final Summary ====
CBS

Sunday, March 27
5:05 pm EDT

Box score

#4 Kentucky Wildcats 76, #2 North Carolina Tar Heels 69
Scoring by half: 38–30, 38–39
Pts: B. Knight – 22; Rebs: J. Harrellson – 8 Asts: D. Liggins, J. Harrellson, B. Knight – 4	Pts: T. Zeller – 21; Rebs: T. Zeller, J. Henson – 9 Asts: K. Marshall – 8

Prudential Center – Newark, NJ
Attendance: 18,278
Referees: Verne Harris, Pat Driscoll, Randy McCall

=== West Regional – Anaheim, California ===
First round March 17–18
1	Duke	87
16	Hampton	45
Charlotte – Fri/Sun
8	Michigan	75
9	Tennessee	45
5	Arizona	77
12	Memphis	75
Tulsa – Fri/Sun
4	Texas	85
13	Oakland	81
6	Cincinnati	78
11	Missouri	63
Washington, D.C. – Thu/Sat
3	Connecticut	81
14	Bucknell	52
7	Temple	66
10	Penn State	64
Tucson – Thu/Sat
2	San Diego State	68
15	Northern Colorado	50

Second round March 19–20
1	Duke	73
8	Michigan	71
5	Arizona	70
4	Texas	69
6	Cincinnati	58
3	Connecticut	69
7	Temple	64
2	San Diego State	71^{2OT}

Regional semifinals March 24
1	Duke	77
5	Arizona	93
3	Connecticut	74
2	San Diego State	67

Regional finals March 26
5	Arizona	63
3	Connecticut	65

==== Regional Final Summary ====
CBS

Saturday, March 26
7:05 pm EDT

Box score

#5 Arizona Wildcats 63, #3 Connecticut Huskies 65
Scoring by half: 25–32, 38–33
Pts: D. Williams – 20; Rebs: S. Hill – 10; Asts: S. Hill – 4	Pts: K. Walker – 20; Rebs: A. Oriakhi – 6 Asts: K. Walker – 7

Honda Center – Anaheim, CA
Attendance: 17,856
Referees: Doug Shows, Antinio Petty, Doug Sirmons

=== Southwest Regional – San Antonio, Texas ===
First round March 17–18
1	Kansas	72
16	Boston University	53
Tulsa – Fri/Sun
8	UNLV	62
9	Illinois	73
5	Vanderbilt	66
12	Richmond	69
Denver – Thu/Sat
4	Louisville	61
13	Morehead State	62
6	Georgetown	56
11	VCU	74
Chicago – Fri/Sun
3	Purdue	65
14	Saint Peter's	43
7	Texas A&M	50
10	Florida State	57
Chicago – Fri/Sun
2	Notre Dame	69
15	Akron	56

Second round March 19–20
1	Kansas	73
9	Illinois	59
12	Richmond	65
13	Morehead State	48
11	VCU	94
3	Purdue	76
10	Florida State	71
2	Notre Dame	57

Regional semifinals March 25
1	Kansas	77
12	Richmond	57
11	VCU	72^{OT}
10	Florida State	71

Regional finals March 27
1	Kansas	61
11	VCU	71

==== Regional Final Summary ====
CBS

Sunday, March 27
2:20 pm EDT

Box score

#11 VCU Rams 71, #1 Kansas Jayhawks 61
Scoring by half: 41–27, 30–34
Pts: J. Skeen – 26; Rebs: J. Skeen – 10; Asts: J. Rodriguez – 5	Pts: M. Morris – 20; Rebs: M. Morris – 16; Asts: B. Morningstar, T. Taylor – 3

Alamodome – San Antonio, TX
Attendance: 14,299
Referees: Ted Valentine, Mike Eades, Tony Greene

=== Southeast Regional – New Orleans, Louisiana ===
First round March 17
1	Pittsburgh	74
16	UNC Asheville	51
Washington, D.C. – Thu/Sat
8	Butler	60
9	Old Dominion	58
5	Kansas State	73
12	Utah State	68
Tucson – Thu/Sat
4	Wisconsin	72
13	Belmont	58
6	St. John's	71
11	Gonzaga	86
Denver – Thu/Sat
3	BYU	74
14	Wofford	66
7	UCLA	78
10	Michigan State	76
Tampa – Thu/Sat
2	Florida	79
15	UC Santa Barbara	51

Second round March 19
1	Pittsburgh	70
8	Butler	71
5	Kansas State	65
4	Wisconsin	70
11	Gonzaga	67
3	BYU	89
7	UCLA	65
2	Florida	73

Regional semifinals March 24
8	Butler	61
4	Wisconsin	54
3	BYU	74
2	Florida	83^{OT}

Regional finals March 26
8	Butler	74^{OT}
2	Florida	71

==== Regional Final Summary ====
CBS

Saturday, March 26
4:30 pm EDT

Box score

#8 Butler Bulldogs 74, #2 Florida Gators 71 (OT)
Scoring by half: 32–33, 28–27 Overtime: 14–11
Pts: S. Mack – 27; Rebs: A. Smith – 8 Asts: S. Mack – 4	Pts: V. Macklin – 25; Rebs: A. Tyus – 10; Asts: E. Walker – 4

New Orleans Arena – New Orleans, LA
Attendance: 12,139
Referees: Jamie Luckie, Karl Hess, Michael Stephens

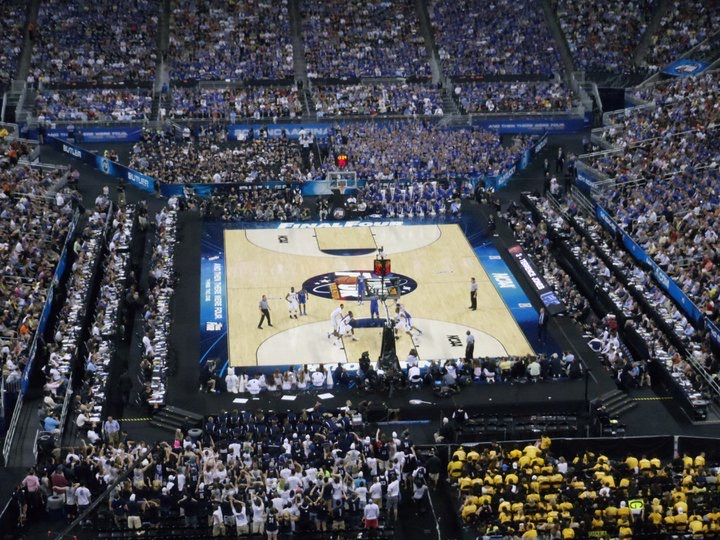
National Semi-Final between UConn and Kentucky

=== Final Four – Reliant Stadium, Houston, Texas ===
National Semifinals; Final Four; Saturday, April 2
E4	Kentucky	55
W3	Connecticut	56
SW11	VCU	62
SE8	Butler	70

National Championship Game; Monday, April 4
W3	Connecticut	53
SE8	Butler	41

=== Game summaries ===
CBS

April 2
6:09 pm EDT

Box score

SW11 VCU Rams 62, SE8 Butler Bulldogs 70
Scoring by half: 28–34, 34–36
Pts: J. Skeen – 27; Rebs: B. Burgess – 9 Asts: J. Rodriguez – 8	Pts: S. Mack – 24; Rebs: K. Marshall – 9 Asts: M. Howard – 2

Reliant Stadium – Houston, TX
Attendance: 75,421
Referees: Jamie Luckie, Pat Driscoll, Michael Stephens

CBS

April 2
9:08 pm EDT

Box score

E4 Kentucky Wildcats 55, W3 Connecticut Huskies 56
Scoring by half: 21–31, 34–25
Pts: B. Knight – 17; Rebs: T. Jones – 15; Asts: B. Knight – 5	Pts: K. Walker – 18; Rebs: A. Oriakhi – 10; Asts: K. Walker – 7

Reliant Stadium – Houston, TX
Attendance: 75,421
Referees: Mark Whitehead, John Higgins, Les Jones

Consisting of #3-seeded Connecticut, No. 4 Kentucky, No. 8 Butler, and No. 11 Virginia Commonwealth (VCU), It was the first time in the tournament's history that a No. 1 or a No. 2 seed had failed to reach the final four and it would not happen again until 2023, coincidentally, also in Houston. 11th seeded VCU tied a record as the lowest seed to reach the final four. By virtue of their "first four" appearance, VCU became the first team to reach the final four by winning five tournament games.

The first semifinal featured Butler and VCU, with Butler winning 70–62, despite VCU forward Jamie Skeen leading the scoring with 27 points.

The second semifinal match was between Kentucky and Connecticut. Connecticut had already defeated Kentucky earlier that season 84–67 at the Maui Invitational. This time, Connecticut won in a close game 56–55, led by Kemba Walker with 18 points. Connecticut were noted for their defensive effort, which held Kentucky to 34% shooting and also held Kentucky scoreless for over 5 minutes during a spell in the second half.

=== National Championship ===
CBS

April 4
9:23 pm EDT

Box score

#8 Butler Bulldogs 41, #3 Connecticut Huskies 53
Scoring by half: 22–19, 19–34
Pts: S. Mack – 13; Rebs: S. Mack – 9 Asts: S. Vanzant – 2	Pts: K. Walker – 16; Rebs: A. Oriakhi – 11; Asts: J. Lamb, S. Napier – 2

Reliant Stadium – Houston, TX
Attendance: 70,376
Referees: John Cahill, Verne Harris, Doug Shows

The National Championship game was between Butler, a mid-major university team that was a surprise finalist in the 2010 tournament, and Connecticut, a basketball powerhouse which had previously won the tournament twice under coach Jim Calhoun but had an average regular season finishing 9th in the Big East Conference before winning The Big East tournament with five wins in five consecutive days (never before accomplished in NCAA history). The championship game was won by Connecticut 53–41. It was a very defensive contest, with Butler having the fewest points in a championship game since 1949. Butler led at halftime 22–19, but suffered in the second half from poor shooting, making only 6 of 37 shots in the second half. Butler's 18.8 percent shooting for the entire game was the lowest ever in the NCAA final. Connecticut contributed to Butler's poor shooting by blocking 10 shots (a championship game record). Butler was led in scoring by junior guard Shelvin Mack with 13 points, while UConn freshman Jeremy Lamb scored 12 points in the 2nd half.

The win by Connecticut completed a season-ending 11-game win streak that began with the Big East tournament.

The game was widely viewed as a poor quality final. In reference to the game's first half of play, CBS analyst Greg Anthony said, "This is the worst half of basketball I've ever seen in a national championship game."

== Upsets ==
Per the NCAA, "Upsets are defined as when the winner of the game was seeded five or more places lower than the team it defeated."

The 2011 tournament saw a total of 11 upsets, with five in the first round, four in the second round, and two in the Elite Eight.

Upsets in the 2011 NCAA Division I men's basketball tournament
Round	East	West	Southwest	Southeast
Round of 64	No. 11 Marquette defeated No. 6 Xavier, 66–55	None	No. 13 Morehead State defeated No. 4 Louisville, 75–70; No. 12 Richmond defeated No. 5 Vanderbilt, 69–66; No. 11 VCU defeated No. 6 Georgetown, 74–56	No. 11 Gonzaga defeated No. 6 St. John's, 86–71
Round of 32	No. 11 Marquette defeated No. 3 Syracuse, 66–62	None	No. 11 VCU defeated No. 3 Purdue, 94–76; No. 10 Florida State defeated No. 2 Notre Dame, 71–57	No. 8 Butler defeated No. 1 Pittsburgh, 71–70
Sweet 16	None			
Elite 8	None		No. 11 VCU defeated No. 1 Kansas, 71–61	No. 8 Butler defeated No. 2 Florida, 74–71 ^{OT}
Final 4	None			
National Championship	None			

== Record by conference ==
Conference	# of bids	Record	Win %	R32	S16	E8	F4	CG	NC
Big East	11	13–10	.565	7	2	1	1	1	1
Horizon	1	5–1	.833	1	1	1	1	1	0
CAA	3	6–3	.667	2	1	1	1	0	
SEC	5	7–5	.583	2	2	2	1	0	
ACC	4	8–4	.667	3	3	1	0		
Pac-10	4	5–4	.556	3	1	1	0		
Big 12	5	5–5	.500	3	1	1	0		
Mountain West	3	4–3	.571	2	2	0			
Atlantic 10	3	3–3	.500	2	1	0			
Big Ten	7	7–7	.500	5	2	0			
OVC	1	1–1	.500	1	0				
WCC	1	1–1	.500	1	0				
C-USA	2	0–2	.000	0					

- The R32, S16, E8, F4, CG, and NC columns indicate how many teams from each conference were in the round of 32 (third round), Sweet 16, Elite Eight, Final Four, championship game, and national champion, respectively.
- The SWAC and Sun Belt Conference each had one representative, eliminated in the first round.
- The America East Conference, Atlantic Sun Conference, Big Sky Conference, Big West Conference, Ivy League, MAAC, MAC, MEAC, MVC, NEC, Patriot League, Southern Conference, Summit League, and WAC each had one representative, eliminated in the second round with a record of 0–1.
- The Big South and Southland each had one representative, eliminated in the second round with a record of 1-1.
- The Big East Conference had a record 11 teams in the tournament, which made intra-Big East matchups possible prior to the Elite Eight. There were two such matchups in the 3rd round, Syracuse vs. Marquette and Connecticut vs. Cincinnati. The two Big East teams to make the Sweet Sixteen beat conference opponents to advance to that round.

== Media ==
=== Television ===
On April 22, 2010, it was announced that the NCAA had reached a new 14-year, US$10.8 billion deal with CBS Sports and Time Warner-owned Turner Sports (by way of TBS, TNT and truTV) for the rights to broadcast the NCAA tournament from 2011 until 2024 (later extended to 2032 in the 2016 tournament), marking the first time every game in the tournament would be telecast on a national basis.

CBS and Turner pooled their resources for the tournament, with members of the NBA on TNT crew joining CBS's established March Madness broadcasters. Coverage will originate from the CBS Broadcast Center in New York City and Turner's Atlanta studios.

The tournament television ratings report shows the tournament had an average of 10.2 million viewers per game, an increase from the 2005 tournament when it drew an average of 10.6 million (6.4 Nielsen rating). The championship game recorded an 11.7 rating and drew 20.1 million viewers.

TruTV, which up to that point had never aired any live sports programming, saw a surge in carriage deals for its high definition feed with several major providers including AT&T U-verse, Verizon FiOS, Comcast, Charter Communications, Cablevision, Cox Cable and RCN.

==== Studio hosts ====
- Greg Gumbel (New York City and Houston) – First Four, Second round, Third round, Regionals, Final Four and National Championship Game
- Ernie Johnson Jr. (New York City and Atlanta) – First Four, Second round, Third round and Regional Semi-Finals
- Matt Winer (Atlanta) – First Four, Second round and Third round

==== Studio analysts ====
- Greg Anthony (New York City and Houston) – First Four, Second round, Third round, Regionals, Final Four and National Championship Game
- Charles Barkley (New York City and Houston) – First Four, Second round, Third round, Regionals, Final Four and National Championship Game
- Tom Crean (Atlanta) – First Four and Second round
- Seth Davis (Atlanta and Houston) – First Four, Second round, Third round, Regional Semi-Finals, Final Four and National Championship Game
- Tom Izzo (Atlanta) – Regional Semi-Finals
- Phil Martelli (Atlanta) – Third round
- Rick Pitino (New York City) – Third round
- Kenny Smith (New York City and Houston) – First Four, Second round, Third round, Regionals, Final Four and National Championship Game
- Steve Smith (Atlanta) – First Four, Second round, Third round and Regional Semi-Finals
- Jay Wright (New York City) – Regional Finals

==== Announcing teams ====
- Jim Nantz/Clark Kellogg/Steve Kerr/Tracy Wolfson – First Four at Dayton, Ohio; Second and Third round at Charlotte, North Carolina; East Regional at Newark, New Jersey; Final Four at Houston, Texas
  Kerr joined Nantz and Kellogg during the First Four, Final Four, and National Championship games
- Marv Albert/Steve Kerr/Craig Sager – Second and Third round at Tulsa, Oklahoma; Southwest Regional at San Antonio, Texas
- Verne Lundquist/Bill Raftery/Lesley Visser – Second and Third round at Denver, Colorado; West Regional at Anaheim, California
- Gus Johnson/Len Elmore/Reggie Miller/Marty Snider – First Four at Dayton, Ohio; Second and Third round at Cleveland, Ohio; Southeast Regional at New Orleans, Louisiana
  Miller joined Johnson and Elmore during the Regional games
- Kevin Harlan/Reggie Miller/Dan Bonner/Sam Ryan – Second and Third round at Tucson, Arizona
- Ian Eagle/Jim Spanarkel/David Aldridge – Second and Third round at Tampa, Florida
- Tim Brando/Mike Gminski/Lewis Johnson – Second and Third round at Washington, D.C.
- Spero Dedes/Bob Wenzel/Jaime Maggio – Second and Third round at Chicago, Illinois

==== Round-by-round game schedule ====
All times Eastern and PM

Round	CBS	TBS	TNT	TruTV
First Four (Mar. 15 & 16)				6:30; 9:00
2nd round (Mar. 17 & 18)	12:00; 2:30; 7:00; 9:30	1:30; 4:00; 6:45; 9:15	2:00; 4:30; 7:15; 9:45	12:40; 3:00; 7:15; 9:55
3rd round (Mar. 19)	12:00; 2:30; 5:00; 7:30	7:00; 9:30	6:00; 8:00	
3rd round (Mar. 20)	12:00; 2:30; 5:00	7:00; 9:30	6:00; 8:00	7:30
Regional semifinals (Mar. 24 & 25)	7:00; 9:30	7:15; 9:55		
Regional finals (Mar. 26)	4:20; 6:55			
Regional finals (Mar. 27)	2:10; 5:05			
National semifinals (Apr. 2)	6:09; 9:09			
National championship (Apr. 4)	9:00			

CBS received the same number of "windows", or time slots, for its tournament coverage as in previous years. However, all games will now be nationally – rather than regionally – televised. The national television broadcasts also allowed for more flexibility in start times. CBS and the Turner networks used the same graphics package and theme music in broadcasting the tournament – the only difference between networks is the logo shown on the score bug. In addition, a banner at the top of the screen displayed the scores of other games along with what network they are being broadcast on. Replays feature all four network logos being shown, and for fair use highlight credits by local television stations and other networks such as ESPN, the Turner network name or CBS Sports, followed by "NCAA" is given as the source. CBS also kept coverage of the Division II final, which is part of the larger contract for this tournament.

Turner Sports aired full-length studio shows before and after each session of play. The pregame show was called Infiniti NCAA Tip-Off and all shows were on TruTV. The postgame show, called Inside March Madness presented by Buick, alternated between TruTV and TBS.

TruTV had also added coverage of the Reese's College All-Star Game.

===== Number of games per network =====
- CBS: 26
- TBS: 16
- TruTV: 13
- TNT: 12

=== Radio ===
Westwood One had live broadcasts of all 67 games. They will be available both on terrestrial and satellite radio outlets, on NCAA.com, and on CBSSports.com. The radio contract was extended in January 2011 for multiple tournaments.

==== First Four ====
- Dave Ryan and Alaa Abdelnaby – at Dayton, Ohio

==== Second and Third round ====
- Scott Graham and Kevin Grevey – Second and Third round at Washington, D.C.
- Dave Sims and Bill Frieder – Second and Third round at Tucson, Arizona
- Ted Robinson and Tom Brennan – Second and Third round at Denver, Colorado
- Gary Cohen and Kyle Macy – Second and Third round at Tampa, Florida
- Kevin Kugler and Pete Gillen – Second and Third round at Cleveland, Ohio
- Kevin Calabro and Will Perdue – Second and Third round at Charlotte, North Carolina
- Wayne Larrivee and John Thompson – Second and Third round at Chicago, Illinois
- Brad Sham and Reid Gettys – Second and Third round at Tulsa, Oklahoma

==== Regionals ====
- Ian Eagle and John Thompson – East Regional at Newark, New Jersey
- Kevin Kugler and Pete Gillen – Southeast Regional at New Orleans, Louisiana
- Kevin Harlan and Kevin Grevey – Southwest Regional at San Antonio, Texas
- Wayne Larrivee and Bill Frieder – West Regional at Anaheim, California

==== Final four ====
- Kevin Kugler, John Thompson and Bill Raftery – at Houston, Texas

=== Internet/other video ===
All games are expected to be streamed at NCAA.com or CBSSports.com, as in the past; with the new rights deal, NCAA.com and the game streaming is now managed by Turner Interactive. The iPhone app which allowed streaming of games on the iPhone in previous years, and had cost about ten dollars, has received two upgrades: it is compatible with iPad, and it is now free of charge. However, with the CBS-Turner agreement allowing all games in the tournament to be available on a national basis (see above), Mega March Madness, a DirecTV-only service, has been discontinued.

=== International ===
- Canada: TSN acquired Canadian rights for the tournament, rights which were previously held by The Score. This is apparently the result of a larger international rights deal between the NCAA and ESPN International (which owns a minority interest in TSN). TSN had its own studio programming hosted by Dan Shulman and James Cybulski, and game coverage came from CBS and Turner. Unlike the Score, which had whiparound coverage, TSN and TSN2 showed entire games. Sometimes, both channels aired games, but on Friday of the first weekend, no games were shown due to previous programming commitments on both channels. TSN.ca also streamed first-round games to those with Canadian IP addresses.
- Philippines: Basketball TV planned to broadcast the NCAA tournament using the American feed.
- Worldwide: The NCAA.com video and audio streams were available with no blackout restrictions anywhere in the world.

== See also ==
- 2011 NCAA Division II men's basketball tournament
- 2011 NCAA Division III men's basketball tournament
- 2011 NCAA Division I women's basketball tournament
- 2011 NCAA Division II women's basketball tournament
- 2011 NCAA Division III women's basketball tournament
- 2011 National Invitation Tournament
- 2011 Women's National Invitation Tournament
- 2011 NAIA Division I men's basketball tournament
- 2011 NAIA Division II men's basketball tournament
- 2011 NAIA Division I women's basketball tournament
- 2011 NAIA Division II women's basketball tournament
- 2011 College Basketball Invitational
- 2011 CollegeInsider.com Postseason Tournament
