= Jamie Skeen =

American basketball player

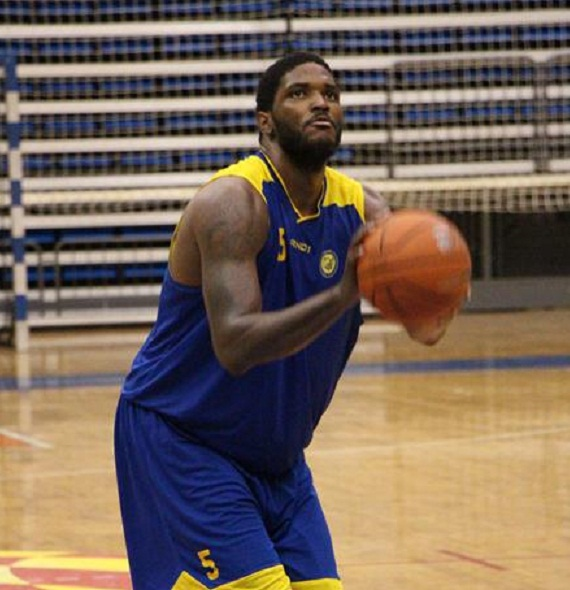
- Skeen with Maccabi Ashdod in September 2012

Leuven Bears
- Position: Power forward
- League: Pro Basketball League

Personal information
- Born: May 2, 1988 (age 38) Fayetteville, North Carolina, U.S.
- Listed height: 6 ft 8 in (2.03 m)
- Listed weight: 216 lb (98 kg)

Career information
- High school: North Mecklenburg (Huntersville, North Carolina)
- College: Wake Forest (2006–2008); VCU (2009–2011)
- NBA draft: 2011: undrafted
- Playing career: 2011–present

Career history
- 2011: ASVEL
- 2011–2012: Ironi Ashkelon
- 2012–2013: Maccabi Ashdod
- 2013–2014: Sutor Montegranaro
- 2014: Caciques de Humacao
- 2014–2015: Belfius Mons-Hainaut
- 2016–2017: Peja
- 2017–2018: Kouvot
- 2018: Hawke's Bay Hawks
- 2018–2019: Salon Vilpas Vikings
- 2019–present: Leuven Bears

Career highlights
- Second-team All-CAA (2011)

Jamie O'Brien Skeen (born May 2, 1988) is an American professional basketball player for Leuven Bears of the Pro Basketball League.

== College career ==
Between 2006 and 2008, Skeen played college basketball for Wake Forest. Skeen was declared ineligible for the fall semester of the 2008–09 season for violating the school's academic policy. He informed the team in early December 2008 he would not appeal for reinstatement to the university, and subsequently transferred to VCU. As a senior at VCU in 2010–11, Skeen earned second-team All-CAA, CAA All-Tournament Team, and NABC Division I All-District 10 First Team honors. He also helped the Rams reach the Final Four of the 2011 NCAA tournament. In 39 games as a senior, he averaged 15.7 points and 7.3 rebounds per game.

== Professional career ==
Skeen split the 2011–12 season in France (ASVEL) and Israel (Ironi Ashkelon), before playing for the Chicago Bulls during the 2012 NBA Summer League. He returned to the Israel for the 2013–14 season, joining Maccabi Ashdod. After a stint with the Charlotte Bobcats during the 2013 NBA Summer League, Skeen spent the 2013–14 season in Italy with Sutor Montegranaro. After a stint in Puerto Rico with Caciques de Humacao, he played for the Charlotte Hornets during the 2014 NBA Summer League. He then spent the 2014–15 season in Belgium with Belfius Mons-Hainaut.

After sitting out the 2015–16 season, Skeen's first stint back was with the Greensboro Swarm of the NBA Development League during the 2016 preseason. In December 2016, he moved to Kosovo to play for KB Peja.

On July 26, 2017, Skeen signed a two-year deal with Serbian club Partizan. The next month he arrived in Belgrade and did not pass the medical examinations, so the contract was terminated on August 18, 2017. On September 7, 2017, he signed with the Finnish club Kouvot for the 2017–18 Korisliiga season.

In May 2018, Skeen joined the Hawke's Bay Hawks for the 2018 New Zealand NBL season.

For the 2018–19 season, Skeen joined Salon Vilpas Vikings of the Finnish Korisliiga.

On September 3, 2019, he has signed with Leuven Bears of the Pro Basketball League.
