= 2010–11 Temple Owls men's basketball team =

American college basketball season

2010–11 Temple Owls men's basketball

NCAA Tournament, Round of 32
- Conference: Atlantic 10 Conference
- Record: 26–8 (14–2 A-10)
- Head coach: Fran Dunphy
- Assistant coaches: Dave Duke; Matt Langel; Shawn Trice
- Home arena: Liacouras Center

2010–11 Atlantic 10 men's basketball standings
	Conf.				Overall
Team	W		L	PCT	W		L	PCT
No. 20 Xavier	15	–	1	.938	24	–	8	.750
Temple	14	–	2	.875	26	–	8	.765
Richmond †	13	–	3	.813	29	–	8	.784
Duquesne	10	–	6	.625	19	–	13	.594
George Washington	10	–	6	.625	17	–	14	.548
Rhode Island	9	–	7	.563	20	–	14	.588
St. Bonaventure	8	–	8	.500	16	–	15	.516
Dayton	7	–	9	.438	22	–	14	.611
UMass	7	–	9	.438	15	–	15	.500
La Salle	6	–	10	.375	15	–	18	.455
Saint Louis	6	–	10	.375	12	–	19	.387
Saint Joseph's	4	–	12	.250	11	–	22	.333
Charlotte	2	–	14	.125	10	–	20	.333
Fordham	1	–	15	.063	7	–	21	.250
† 2011 Atlantic 10 Tournament winner As of March 25, 2011; Rankings from AP Poll

The 2010–11 Temple Owls men's basketball team (the Owls) represented Temple University in the 2010–11 NCAA Division I men's basketball season. The team played their home games at the Liacouras Center, which has a capacity of 10,206. The Owls were in their 29th season as a member of the Atlantic 10 Conference. In the previous season, Temple Owls gained a record of 29–6 and reached the NCAA tournament. The team returned three starters from the previous season, but leading scorer Ryan Brooks and point guard Luis Guzman left, having graduated. They were replaced by new players Aaron Brown, Anthony Lee, and Jimmy McDonnell and graduate student transfer Dutch Gaitley. In the off-season, other Atlantic 10 coaches predicted that Temple Owls would win the league.

Temple Owls finished the season with a 26–8 record. Among the highlights of the year was an upset of #10 Georgetown on December 9, in coach Fran Dunphy's 400th victory. In addition, Lavoy Allen became Temple Owls' all-time leading rebounder in a 66–52 rout of Saint Joseph's. Allen snatched 12 boards to pass Temple Owls' radio analyst Johnny Baum's 1,042 career rebounds. The Owls' 14–2 mark in Atlantic 10 play earned them a two seed in the 2011 Atlantic 10 men's basketball tournament, where they lost in the semifinals to Richmond.

The team earned an at-large bid to the 2011 NCAA Division I men's basketball tournament as a seven seed, and defeated Penn State in the round of 64 on a last-second shot by guard Juan Fernandez. The win ended Dunphy's 11-game losing streak in the NCAA Tournament, the longest on record. Temple Owls' season ended with a double overtime loss to San Diego State in the round of 32. After the season, Allen was selected for the All-Atlantic 10 First Team, Ramone Moore was selected for the All-Atlantic 10 Second Team, Fernandez was an All-Atlantic 10 Third Team selection, and Scootie Randall was recognized as an All-Atlantic 10 Honorable Mention. Allen was drafted by the Philadelphia 76ers in the second round of the 2011 NBA draft.

== Preseason ==
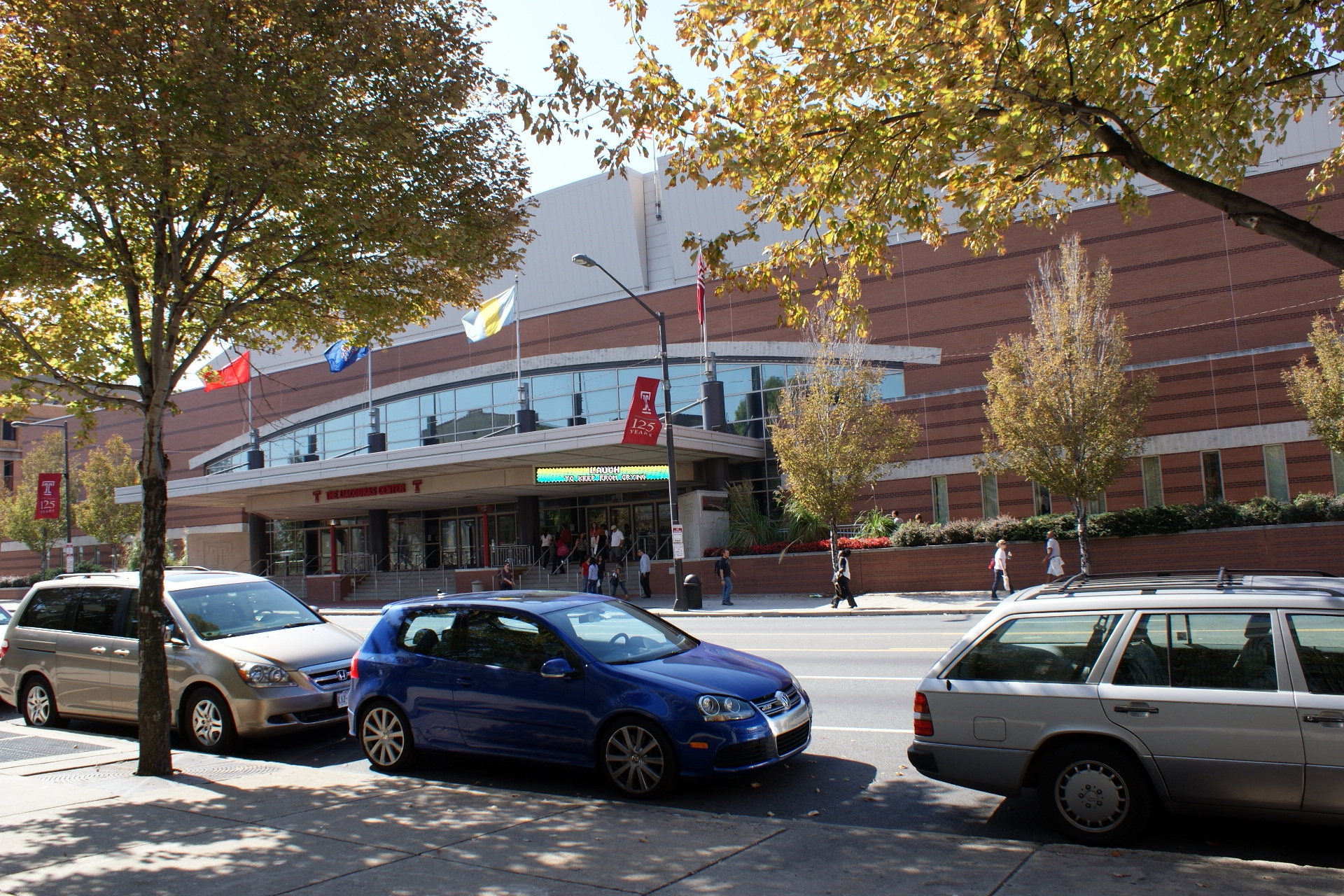
Temple played their home games at the Liacouras Center in Philadelphia.

In 2010–11, the Temple Owls men's basketball team were in their 29th season as a member of the Atlantic 10 Conference. Since 1997, the team has played their home games at the Liacouras Center, which has a capacity of 10,206. In their previous season, an Atlantic 10 Preseason Poll predicted that Temple Owls would finish fifth in the conference, tied with Duquesne. Despite the low expectations, the Owls were tied with Xavier atop the Atlantic 10 standings with a 14–2 conference record, and won their third straight Atlantic 10 tournament title. The team drew a five seed in the 2010 NCAA Division I men's basketball tournament, where they lost to 12 seed Cornell in the first round, 78–65, and finished with a record of 29–6. Head coach Fran Dunphy was rewarded with a contract extension on May 5, 2010, and will stay with Temple Owls until the 2017–18 season.

Before the 2010–11 season, Temple Owls men's basketball team lost two starters from the previous year to graduation: Ryan Brooks and Luis Guzman. Brooks was the team's highest scorer, with an average of 14.3 points per game, and averages of 4.2 rebounds and 2.3 assists per game. In his final season, he was selected for the all-conference second team and finished his career with 1,225 points, the 31st highest in Temple Owls' history. Guzman was the Owls' starting point guard, leading the team in assist-to-turnover ratio at 2.07 and averaged 4.9 points, 4.2 rebounds, and 3.2 assists per game. He was the team's captain and earned a degree in Bachelor of Business Administration in three and a half years. Walk-on forward Rafael DeLeon also graduated.

Two players left Temple Owls voluntarily: sophomores Chris Clarke and Carmel Bouchman. Clarke redshirted in 2009–10 after transferring from Pensacola Junior College, transferred again to Division II Morehouse College. Bouchman appeared in nine games and tallied a total of 12 minutes and two points before returning to Tel Aviv, Israel. Lavoy Allen, a first team all-conference selection and the team's leading rebounder at 10.7 rebounds per game. Allen briefly played with the 2010 NBA draft, but returned to Temple Owls for his senior season. Forward Craig Williams had foot surgery and did not play that season.

On October 21, 2010, the Owls were voted by other Atlantic 10 coaches as the preseason favorite to win the league, receiving 19 first place votes. Allen was selected for the All-Conference First Team and Defensive Team, while Juan Fernandez was selected for the second team. Allen was listed on the preseason Wooden and Naismith Award 50-man watchlist. Jay Bilas of ESPN named Temple Owls the third best team in the Atlantic 10, behind Xavier and Dayton. He cited Allen's summer experience on the USA select team and the development of Michael Eric as factors for a successful season.

=== Recruiting ===
==== Incoming signees ====
Anthony Lee, a center from Eustis, Florida, joined Temple Owls on September 26, 2009, becoming the first member of the Owls' recruiting class. The Maryland native transferred from Eustis High School to West Oaks Academy after his junior year. As a senior, he averaged 23.0 points, 14.0 rebounds, and 3.0 blocks per game while winning MVP honors from the Sunshine Independent Athletic Association. ESPN ranked him the #38 center in his class. Lee picked Temple Owls over scholarship offers from Southern California, Georgia, and Seton Hall. After undergoing surgery for a herniated disc, Lee redshirted the season.

On November 2, small forward Aaron Brown of Newark, New Jersey signed with the Owls. He posted per-game averages of 17.6 points, 4.0 rebounds, 4.5 assists, and 3.0 steals in his senior campaign at St. Benedict's Prep. Brown was a New Jersey All-Prep First Team selection in 2010 and participated in the Jordan Brand Classic Regional. He chose Temple Owls over Harvard, Miami (Fl.), Penn, Boston College, and Florida State.

Small forward Jimmy McDonnell, from Jackson, New Jersey, joined the team on August 11, 2010. In his senior season at Jackson Memorial High School, McDonnell averaged 13.9 points, 6.5 rebounds, and 4.0 blocks per game as Jackson Memorial compiled a 16–8 record. McDonnell was selected for the first team all-Division in the A-Shore Conference, and was the most valuable player at the WOBM Holiday Classic. McDonnell was originally headed to Division II UMass Lowell, but after a strong performance at the West Virginia HoopGroup JamFest, he drew the attention of Owls coach Fran Dunphy. McDonnell redshirted the season to add bulk to his frame.

Dutch Gaitley was granted a one-time transfer exception by the NCAA and was eligible immediately, instead of sitting out the customary season. The forward graduated in three years from Monmouth University, earning his Bachelor of Arts degree in 2009. At Temple, Gaitley pursued a master's degree in sports administration. A native of Haverford, Pennsylvania, he was a 2006 graduate of Archbishop Carroll High School. In 88 games at Monmouth, he averaged 2.3 points and 4.1 rebounds per game.

College recruiting
Name	Hometown	School	Height	Weight	Commit date
Anthony Lee; F/C	Eustis, Florida	West Oaks Academy (FL)	6 ft 9 in (2.06 m)	195 lb (88 kg)	Sep 26, 2009
Anthony Lee; F/C	Recruit ratings: Scout: Rivals: (88)				
Aaron Brown; SF	Newark, New Jersey	St. Benedict's Prep (NJ)	6 ft 3 in (1.91 m)	185 lb (84 kg)	Nov 2, 2009
Aaron Brown; SF	Recruit ratings: Scout: Rivals: (83)				
Jimmy McDonnell; PF	Jackson, New Jersey	Jackson Memorial HS (NJ)	6 ft 10 in (2.08 m)	190 lb (86 kg)	Aug 11, 2010
Jimmy McDonnell; PF	Recruit ratings: (40)				
Overall recruit ranking:
Note: In many cases, Scout, Rivals, 247Sports, On3, and ESPN may conflict in their listings of height and weight.; In these cases, the average was taken. ESPN grades are on a 100-point scale.; Sources: "Temple 2010 Basketball Commitments". Rivals.; "2010 Temple Basketball Commits". Scout.; "ESPN". ESPN.; "Scout.com Team Recruiting Rankings". Scout.; "2010 Team Ranking". Rivals.

==== 2011–12 team recruits ====
The sole member of the Owls' 2011 recruiting class was Will Cummings, a point guard from Jacksonville, Florida who committed on September 4, 2010. He averaged 18.1 points, 8.1 assists, 4.0 steals per game as a senior at Providence School, in addition to carrying a 4.0 grade point average. The Jacksonville Times-Union named him the high school boys' basketball player of the year. Cummings drew attention from Stanford, Miami (Fl.), and Boston College, but chose Temple because of their winning tradition.

College recruiting
Name	Hometown	School	Height	Weight	Commit date
Will Cummings; PG	Jacksonville, Florida	Providence School (FL)	6 ft 1 in (1.85 m)	165 lb (75 kg)	Sep 4, 2010
Will Cummings; PG	Recruit ratings: Scout: Rivals: (91)				
Overall recruit ranking:
Note: In many cases, Scout, Rivals, 247Sports, On3, and ESPN may conflict in their listings of height and weight.; In these cases, the average was taken. ESPN grades are on a 100-point scale.; Sources: "Temple 2011 Basketball Commitments". Rivals.; "2011 Temple Basketball Commits". Scout.; "ESPN". ESPN.; "Scout.com Team Recruiting Rankings". Scout.; "2011 Team Ranking". Rivals.

== Roster ==
=== Players ===
#	Name	Height	Weight (lbs.)	Position	Class	Hometown		High school
1	Khalif Wyatt	6 ft 4 in (1.93 m)	210 pounds (95 kg)	G	So.	Norristown, Pennsylvania	U.S.	Norristown HS
3	Anthony Lee	6 ft 9 in (2.06 m)	205 pounds (93 kg)	F/C	Fr.	Orlando, Florida	U.S.	West Oaks Academy
4	Juan Fernandez	6 ft 4 in (1.93 m)	180 pounds (82 kg)	G	Jr.	Río Tercero, Córdoba	Argentina	Dr. Alexis Carrel HS
11	T. J. DiLeo	6 ft 2 in (1.88 m)	195 pounds (88 kg)	G	So.	Cinnaminson, New Jersey	U.S.	Cinnaminson HS
15	Jimmy McDonnell	6 ft 10 in (2.08 m)	190 pounds (86 kg)	F	Fr.	Jackson, New Jersey	U.S.	Jackson Memorial HS
22	Aaron Brown	6 ft 5 in (1.96 m)	210 pounds (95 kg)	G	Fr.	Newark, New Jersey	U.S.	St. Benedict's Prep
23	Ramone Moore	6 ft 4 in (1.93 m)	180 pounds (82 kg)	G	Jr.	Philadelphia, Pennsylvania	U.S.	South Philadelphia HS
24	Lavoy Allen	6 ft 9 in (2.06 m)	225 pounds (102 kg)	F	Sr.	Morrisville, Pennsylvania	U.S.	Pennsbury HS
30	Craig Williams	6 ft 9 in (2.06 m)	240 pounds (110 kg)	F	Sr.	Christiansted, U.S. Virgin Islands	U.S.	St. Croix Central HS
31	Jake Godino	6 ft 0 in (1.83 m)	170 pounds (77 kg)	G	Jr.	Chester, Pennsylvania	U.S.	Delaware County Christian School
32	Rahlir Jefferson	6 ft 6 in (1.98 m)	200 pounds (91 kg)	F	So.	Chester, Pennsylvania	U.S.	Chester HS
33	Scootie Randall	6 ft 6 in (1.98 m)	205 pounds (93 kg)	F	Jr.	Philadelphia, Pennsylvania	U.S.	Communications Tech HS
45	Dutch Gaitley	6 ft 9 in (2.06 m)	240 pounds (110 kg)	C	Sr.	Haverford, Pennsylvania	U.S.	Archbishop Carroll HS
50	Micheal Eric	6 ft 11 in (2.11 m)	240 pounds (110 kg)	F/C	Jr.	Lagos	Nigeria	Church Farm School

=== Coaches ===
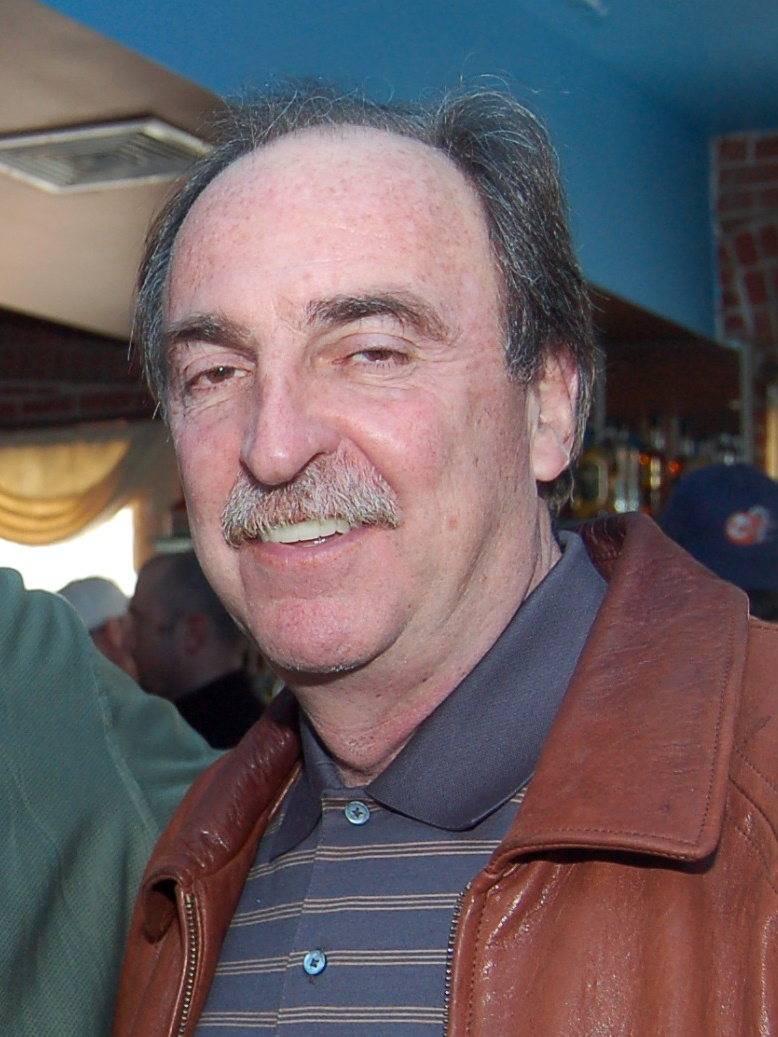
Fran Dunphy was the head coach of the 2010–11 Temple Owls men's basketball team.

Name	Position	Year at Temple	Alma mater (year)
Fran Dunphy	Head coach	5th	La Salle (1970)
Dave Duke	Assistant coach	5th	Villanova (1974)
Matt Langel	Assistant coach	5th	Pennsylvania (2000)
Shawn Trice	Assistant coach	5th	Pennsylvania (1995)
Jeff Wilson	Director of operations	5th	Temple (2004)
John Poulous	Athletic trainer	1st	Temple (2010)
Dion Dacons	Coordinator of student development/manager	3rd	Temple (2007)
Marc Proto	Strength & conditioning coach	4th	Connecticut College (1996)
Raheem Mapp	Administrative coordinator	1st	Temple (2009)

== Schedule ==
2010–11 game log
November

Game	Date	Team	Score	High points	High rebounds	High assists	Location Attendance	Record
1	November 12	Seton Hall	W 62–56	Ramone Moore – 14	Rahlir Jefferson – 10	Juan Fernandez – 5	Liacouras Center, Philadelphia, PA (8,368)	1–0
2	November 14	Toledo	W 82–49	Micheal Eric – 14	Eric – 9	Lavoy Allen – 6	Liacouras Center, Philadelphia, PA (4,087)	2–0
3	November 25	California	L 57–50	Allen – 13	Jefferson – 8	Allen/Fernandez – 2	HP Field House, Lake Buena Vista, FL (2,973)	2–1
4	November 26	Georgia	W 65–58	Scootie Randall – 18	Moore – 8	Fernandez/Moore/Jefferson – 3	HP Field House, Lake Buena Vista, FL (2,932)	3–1
5	November 28	Texas A&M	L 54–51	Allen/Fernandez – 10	Allen/Jefferson – 7	Allen/Khalif Wyatt/T. J. DiLeo – 2	HP Field House, Lake Buena Vista, FL (2,973)	3–2

December

Game	Date	Team	Score	High points	High rebounds	High assists	Location Attendance	Record
6	December 1	Central Michigan	W 65–53	Fernandez – 18	Allen – 10	Randall – 3	McGuirk Arena, Mt. Pleasant, MI (5,350)	4–2
7	December 5	Maryland	W 64–61	Moore – 16	Allen – 10	Fernandez – 3	Verizon Center, Washington, DC (10,227)	5–2
8	December 9	#10 Georgetown	W 68–65	Moore – 30	Allen – 6	Allen – 4	Liacouras Center, Philadelphia, PA (9,509)	6–2
9	December 12	Akron	W 82–47	Eric – 16	Jefferson – 9	Fernandez – 5	Liacouras Center, Philadelphia, PA (3,834)	7–2
10	December 18	Northern Illinois	W 84–74	Allen – 22	Eric – 12	Fernandez – 7	Liacouras Center, Philadelphia, PA (3,116)	8–2
11	December 22	Ohio	W 76–65	Jefferson – 18	Allen – 13	Fernandez – 9	Convocation Center, Athens, OH (6,942)	9–2
12	December 30	#8 Villanova	L 78–74	Allen – 22	Allen – 9	Fernandez – 5	The Pavilion, Villanova, PA (6,500)	9–3

January

Game	Date	Team	Score	High points	High rebounds	High assists	Location Attendance	Record
13	January 5	Fordham	W 70–51	Moore/Fernandez – 15	Eric – 11	Moore – 4	IZOD Center, East Rutherford, NJ (2,178)	10–3 (1–0)
14	January 9	Saint Louis	W 57–53	Moore – 15	Moore – 8	Eric/Jefferson – 2	Liacouras Center, Philadelphia, PA (3,336)	11–3 (2–0)
15	January 12	St. Bonaventure	W 83–55	Moore – 19	Eric – 7	Wyatt – 6	Liacouras Center, Philadelphia, PA (3,213)	12–3 (3–0)
16	January 15	Duquesne	L 78–66	Moore – 18	Aaron Brown – 6	Allen – 3	A.J. Palumbo Center, Pittsburgh, PA (3,506)	12–4 (3–1)
17	January 19	Penn	W 73–56	Wyatt – 27	Allen/Eric – 6	Moore – 6	Liacouras Center, Philadelphia, PA (7,838)	13–4
18	January 22	Xavier	L 88–77	Randall – 28	Eric – 11	Fernandez/Moore – 5	Cintas Center, Cincinnati, OH (10,250)	13–5 (3–2)
19	January 26	Charlotte	W 76–67	Wyatt – 17	Allen – 15	Wyatt – 6	Liacouras Center, Philadelphia, PA (2,679)	14–5 (4–2)
20	January 29	Saint Joseph's	W 72–64	Randall – 17	Allen – 12	Moore – 8	The Palestra, Philadelphia, PA (7,342)	15–5 (5–2)

February

Game	Date	Team	Score	High points	High rebounds	High assists	Location Attendance	Record
21	February 2	La Salle	W 71–67	Wyatt – 18	Allen – 7	Moore – 5	Tom Gola Arena, Philadelphia, PA (3,121)	16–5 (6–2)
22	February 5	Rhode Island	W 80–67	Randall – 27	Allen – 10	Moore/Fernandez – 6	Liacouras Center, Philadelphia, PA (8,679)	17–5 (7–2)
23	February 9	Fordham	W 77–66	Moore – 22	Allen – 14	Allen/Moore/Wyatt – 4	Liacouras Center, Philadelphia, PA (3,858)	18–5 (8–2)
24	February 12	Dayton	W 75–63	Moore – 26	Moore/Eric – 9	Fernandez – 9	University of Dayton Arena, Dayton, OH (13,117)	19–5 (9–2)
25	February 17	Richmond	W 73–53	Moore – 24	Allen/Jefferson – 7	Allen – 4	Liacouras Center, Philadelphia, PA (6,078)	20–5 (10–2)
26	February 20	Saint Joseph's	W 66–52	Moore – 17	Allen – 12	Fernandez – 6	Liacouras Center, Philadelphia, PA (10,206)	21–5 (11–2)
27	February 23	#1 Duke	L 78–61	Allen – 17	Allen – 13	Jefferson – 6	Cameron Indoor Stadium, Durham, NC (9,314)	21–6
28	February 26	George Washington	W 57–41	Allen – 19	Allen – 16	Moore – 5	Charles E. Smith Athletic Center, Washington, DC (3,532)	22–6 (12–2)

March

Game	Date	Team	Score	High points	High rebounds	High assists	Location Attendance	Record
29	March 2	UMass	W 73–67 (OT)	Fernandez – 19	Allen – 18	Moore – 7	Mullins Center, Amherst, MA (3,641)	23–6 (13–2)
30	March 5	La Salle	W 90–82	Allen – 24	Allen – 11	Fernandez – 7	Liacouras Center, Philadelphia, PA (8,154)	24–6 (14–2)
31	March 11	La Salle	W 96–76	Moore – 23	Allen – 12	Allen – 6	Boardwalk Hall, Atlantic City, NJ	25–6
32	March 12	Richmond	L 58–54	Wyatt – 15	Allen – 10	Fernandez – 10	Boardwalk Hall, Atlantic City, NJ (8,285)	25–7
33	March 17	(10 Seed) Penn State	W 66–64	Moore/Fernandez – 23	Allen – 11	Allen/Fernandez – 3	McKale Center, Tucson, AZ	26–7
34	March 19	(2 Seed) San Diego State	L 71–64 (2OT)	Moore – 17	Jefferson – 12	Wyatt – 4	McKale Center, Tucson, AZ (11,127)	26–8

2010–11 team schedule

== Season ==
=== Preconference season ===
Temple Owls started their season with a 62–56 home win against Seton Hall Pirates on November 12. Seton Hall last led with 8:15 in the first half, off a Herb Pope jump shot to make the score 20–17. The Owls went on a 17–0 run to close the half. They led by up to 16 with 4 minutes and 16seconds left in the game, but Seton Hall scored the next 12 points to cut their deficit to four. Despite retaining most of their players from the 2009–2010 season, when they were the eighth-highest scoring team in Division I at 80.1 points per game, Seton Hall was held to 30 percent shooting by Temple Owls' defense. Juan Fernandez led Temple Owls with 12 points, and Rahlir Jefferson recorded his first double-double at 10 points and 10 rebounds. Owls player Lavoy Allen sat out much of the game with foul trouble. The Owls won their next game against Toledo 82–49. All five starters scored above nine, and Micheal Eric was the highest scorer, with 14 points.

Over Thanksgiving weekend, the Owls traveled to Lake Buena Vista, Florida to participate in the Old Spice Classic. Temple Owls suffered their first loss of the season on November 25, falling to California 57–50. The Golden Bears went on a 16–1 run late in the second half to seal a victory. The next day, Temple Owls recovered to beat Georgia 65–58. Scootie Randall had a career-high 18 points for the Owls, including 15 in the first half. Rahlir Jefferson's converted a three-point play with 41.4 seconds left, securing a win for Temple Owls. In the Old Spice Classic consolation game, Temple Owls lost to Texas A&M 54–51. Texas A&M took a 51–50 lead when B.J. Holmes scored with 18.5 seconds left. Juan Fernandez then missed an open jumper that would have given Temple Owls the lead. "We've got to shoot the ball better. Our defense is pretty solid. We've got a chance to be a good basketball team," said Temple Owls' coach Fran Dunphy after the game.

The team's next challenge was the Central Michigan Chippewas, which Temple Owls handled 65–53. The Owls were losing 31–41 with 16:35 left in the game, but then scored the next eight points. Temple Owls permanently took the lead off a Lavoy Allen layup with 9:30 remaining. Juan Fernandez notched 18 points led the Owls, and Allen had a double-double of 13 points and 10 rebounds. In the teams' first meeting since 2006, Temple Owls knocked off Maryland 63–61. Despite trailing by 15 at halftime, Maryland staged a comeback led by Terrell Stoglin, who had 12 of his 16 points in the second half. James Padgett dunked with 1:49 left to tie the game at 56. Afterwards, Lavoy Allen completed a three-point play, and Khalif Wyatt stole a Dino Gregory pass to put Temple Owls in the lead permanently. The Owls outrebounded the Terrapins 42–32, and Ramone Moore scored 16 points, leading the team.

On December 9, Temple Owls matched up against Georgetown. Fran Dunphy earned his 400th career victory, as his Owls upset the tenth-ranked Hoyas 68–65. At their first home game in almost a month, Temple Owls took an early 6–0 lead and did not trail the entire game. They led by 11 in the first half, and a backdoor cut to Ramone Moore put the Owls up 39–32 at the break. The Hoyas manage to tie the game at 56 when Chris Wright sunk a pair of free throws. A three-pointer from Moore and a putback shot from Rahlir Jefferson enabled Temple Owls to take a 61–56 lead. A hook shot by Georgetown's Julian Vaughn cut the Hoya deficit to one with less than a minute remaining, but Hollis Thompson missed a layup that would have given the Hoyas the lead. Jefferson grabbed the rebound and then netted two foul shots, and a last-second halfcourt shot by Austin Freeman went over the backboard. Temple Owls' fans rushed the court after the buzzer, as Georgetown suffered their first loss of the year. Moore shot 12-for-18 from the floor for a career-high 30 points. Dunphy congratulated his team's defensive effort, holding the Hoyas to 44 percent shooting, and said, "it's all about these guys. They're all great players and great people."

The Owls then defeated three Mid-American Conference teams: Akron, Northern Illinois, and Ohio. On December 12, behind Micheal Eric's 16 points, Temple Owls routed Akron 82–47. At halftime, the Owls led 40–15 after shooting 63 percent in the first half. Temple Owls shot 53.4 percent from the field in an 84–74 win over Northern Illinois. Lavoy Allen had 22 points and Ramone Moore had 21 in the contest. Rahlir Jefferson's career-high 18 points led Temple Owls past Ohio 76–65 for the Owls' sixth consecutive victory.

When Temple Owls squared off against #7 Villanova on December 30, it marked the first time since 1988 that two Philadelphia Big Five teams ranked in the Associated Press poll met. The Owls held star guard Corey Fisher to five points, but his backcourt mates Corey Stokes and Maalik Wayns tallied 24 and 21 points, respectively, to give Villanova a 78–74 victory. The game was back-and-forth all night, and Temple Owls held a 40–39 lead at the break. Villanova built a 10-point lead in the second half, but the Owls went on a 13–0 run to take a three-point lead. With 2.3 seconds left, Lavoy Allen hit a three to cut the Wildcats' lead to 76–74, but Wayns sealed the win with a pair of free throws. Allen scored 22 for Temple Owls, and Juan Fernandez had 20 points.

=== Conference season ===
To begin the conference season, the Owls won against Fordham 70–51 at the IZOD Center. Fordham last won a conference game on January 28, 2009, but Temple Owls had a 27–22 deficit in the first half. However, a balanced offensive attack, led by Juan Fernandez and Ramone Moore's 15 points each, helped Temple Owls to take the lead. Michael Eric scored his first collegiate double-double with 14 points and 11 rebounds, and Lavoy Allen was the fourth starter to score in double figures, with 12 points. On January 6, starting point guard Juan Fernandez bruised his knee in practice and missed the January 9 game against Saint Louis. Despite shooting 30.6 percent from the field, the Owls won 57–53 behind Ramone Moore's 15 points. Temple Owls was behind 41–32 with 10:13 remaining, then went on an 11–2 run. Moore scored five consecutive points to break a tie at 49, giving the Owls a lead. The Billikens missed all seven three-point shots against the Temple Owls defense. Fernandez also missed the January 12 game against St. Bonaventure, but the Owls defeated the Bonnies nonetheless, 83–55. Ramone Moore led all five starters in double-digit scoring with 19 points. The team shot 30 of 59 from the field and 9 for 21 from three-point land.

Temple Owls' first loss in conference play was 78–66 against Duquesne Dukes, despite the return of Juan Fernandez. The Owls began the game by trailing 22–2, missing their first 14 shots. Temple Owls scored their first field goal at the 8:18 mark of the first half, and shot 17 percent in the first half. Duquesne shot 67 percent in the first half en route to a 40–23 halftime lead. In the second half, the Owls scored the first six points, but the Dukes went on an 8–2 run from which Temple Owls could not recover. Ramone Moore contributed 18 points to lead the Owls. Temple Owls recovered with a 75–56 out-of-conference win against Philadelphia Big Five team Penn. Khalif Wyatt scored a career-best 27 points, Ramone Moore added 12 points and Lavoy Allen scored 10 points and six blocks.

Xavier defeated Temple Owls 88–77 on January 22, extending their in-conference home-court winning streak to 35, surpassing Temple Owls' 34-game in-conference consecutive home victories for the longest in Atlantic 10 history. Former Xavier player Brian Grant had his jersey retired at halftime, and the team wore throwback uniforms in his honor. Grant gave the Musketeers a pep talk prior to the game, and Xavier opened an early 16–8 lead. Scootie Randall scored Temple Owls' first 10 points, hitting five out of his first six shots. The Owls took their only lead of the half 29–28 off of a three by Randall. In the second half, the teams traded baskets before Xavier went on a 10–0 run. Randall led Temple Owls on an 11–1 run to tie the game at 66, knocking down two fastbreak layups and a three-point shot, and finished with a career-high 28 points. The Owls took their final lead 69–68 off a Khalif Wyatt three-pointer with 5:30 to go. Afterwards Tu Holloway hit a scoop shot and Mark Lyons had a layup and a steal to give Xavier a 75–69 advantage that they maintained. Holloway scored 21 points and Lyons 19 to score the most points against Temple Owls in the season.

Khalif Wyatt, who replaced Juan Fernandez after Fernandez had continuing knee problems, was key in Temple Owls' 76–67 win over Charlotte. He scored 17 points, collected six dimes, and grabbed six rebounds. Ramone Moore added 16 points, Lavoy Allen recorded a double-double (15 points and 11 rebounds), and Scootie Randall contributed 14 points. On January 29, Temple Owls defeated city rival Saint Joseph's 72–54. Scootie Randall led Temple with 17 points. In their next game, Temple Owls won against La Salle by 71–67. The Owls had a 61–47 lead with 3:17 left, but Aaric Murray led a late Explorers comeback as he connected on two three-point shots. Khalif Wyatt scored 18 points for the Owls.

The Owls defeated Rhode Island 80–67 on February 5. Scootie Randall scored 27 points as Temple Owls shot 53.2 percent from the field. Against Fordham, Temple Owls' 25-point lead was cut to three before winning 77–66. Brandon Frazier of the Rams drained a three-pointer with 13:17 left to trail 53–50, but they would get no closer. Ramone Moore scored 22 points to lead the Owls. Lavoy Allen left the game in the second half with an injury to his right ankle. Allen missed the following game against Dayton, but Temple Owls managed a 75–63 victory nonetheless, sparked by Ramone Moore's 26 points. Temple Owls missed their first seven shots, allowing Dayton to stay in the game. However, Moore hit a three-pointer to start an 11–2 run to put the Owls ahead 18–12. Their defense held Dayton to 37 percent shooting, and Temple Owls maintained their lead. After the game, Dayton coach Brian Gregory said: "...they're [Temple Owls] one of the best passing teams not just in the league, but in the country."

Before the game against Richmond, Temple Owls announced that starting center Micheal Eric was unavailable for the season with a right patella injury. Lavoy Allen returned and Temple Owls ended the Spiders' eight game road winning streak, scoring 73–53. Ramone Moore scored 24 points. Juan Fernandez registered 20 points off of 9–10 shooting. Temple Owls controlled the game with a 16–0 run in the second half and shot 56 percent on the game. Lavoy Allen became Temple Owls' all-time leading rebounder in a 66–52 rout of Saint Joseph's. Allen snatched 12 boards to surpass Temple Owls radio analyst Johnny Baum's career 1,042 rebounds. Ramone Moore's 17 points led the team, and Allen scored 14 points to go along with his milestone rebounds. Temple Owls' forward Scootie Randall was unavailable, having a foot injury. The Owls traveled to Cameron Indoor Stadium to play against top-ranked Duke in a nonconference game. Temple Owls lost to the Blue Devils 78–61, as Kyle Singler led Duke with 28 points. Lavoy Allen scored 17 points and had 13 rebounds for Temple Owls, but Duke increased their lead against the Owls with a second half run.

Temple Owls missed 16 of their first 18 shots against George Washington, trailing by 20–8. Lavoy Allen then took control of the team, scoring 10 consecutive points; at halftime the core was 26–23. In the second half, the Temple Owls defense held the Colonials to two points over the last 11:22, and Temple Owls won 57–41. Allen contributed 19 points and 16 rebounds, while Khalif Wyatt scored 14 points. Juan Fernandez's 19 points helped Temple Owls defeat UMass 73–67, in the Owls' first overtime game. Down four at halftime, Temple Owls tied the game at 65 with 48 seconds left off a free throw by Ramone Moore. Fernandez had a chance to win the game in regulation, but his layup with 1 second left was blocked by UMass's Sampson Carter. In overtime, T. J. DiLeo hit a layup with 4:20 remaining that gave Temple Owls the lead. In Temple Owls' regular season finale, the team earned a 90–82 win against La Salle, behind Lavoy Allen's career-high 24 points.

=== Postseason ===
In the 2011 Atlantic 10 men's basketball tournament, Temple Owls received a two seed by virtue of a 14–2 conference record and earned a bye into the quarterfinals. Due to La Salle beating St. Bonaventure in the first round, Temple Owls was matched up with La Salle. The Owls won the game 96–76, posting their most points of the season in the process. Five players scored more than nine, and Ramone Moore led the charge with 23 points. Kevin Anderson of Richmond scored 22, defeating the Owls in the semifinals 58–54 and ending Temple Owls' ten-game winning streak at Boardwalk Hall. Ramone Moore hit a layup to push the Owls ahead 54–53 with five minutes left. Richmond grabbed the lead 55–54 at the 3:48 mark as Justin Harper scored off a putback. Harper finished the game with 18 points and nine rebounds, and was involved in a controversial end-of-game play. With 30 seconds left, Khalif Wyatt attempted a 3-pointer and Harper came down on him, but no call was made. Wyatt proceeded to foul Harper, who hit the deciding free throws. Wyatt had 15 points, while Lavoy Allen added 12 points and 10 rebounds. Juan Fernandez made only 3 of his 17 field goal attempts.

On Selection Sunday, Temple Owls received a seven seed and was due to face Penn State in the 2011 NCAA Division I men's basketball tournament on March 17 at the McKale Center in Tucson, Arizona. The two teams had played each other in a scrimmage in the preseason. They had also met in the 2001 NCAA Division I men's basketball tournament when the Owls earned an 84–72 victory in the Sweet Sixteen. Coming into the game, Fran Dunphy had an NCAA tournament record 11-game losing streak, at Penn and Temple Owls. "I probably think about it less than others do," said Dunphy, "but you think about it. I would be lying if I said I didn't. But I'm so thrilled for these kids and so thrilled to be in the tournament. We've had a nice run – this particular group, four straight years of going to the NCAA tournament is pretty special."

Scootie Randall returned to the Owls and earned the start, although he only played for six minutes and did not score. The game began with hot shooting by Penn State's Talor Battle, who drained three of his first four threes to put the Nittany Lions up 20–11. A 17-point first half by Juan Fernandez helped Temple Owls take a 35–33 lead at halftime. Jeff Brooks, a starting forward for the Nittany Lions, dislocated his right shoulder a minute into the half and sat out the rest of the game. In the second half, there were ten lead changes, and neither team led by more than four points. Ramone Moore's 15 foot shot with 1:10 remaining pulled the Owls ahead 62–61. In Penn State's ensuing possession, Battle took the ball to the hoop but was blocked by Rahlir Jefferson, and Temple Owls took possession. Fernandez was fouled, and his pair of free throws with 28 seconds left extended the Owl lead to 64–61. With the clock at 12.2, Battle hit a three pointer from beyond the NBA line to tie the game at 64-64. Fran Dunphy called a timeout, and Khalif Wyatt advised Dunphy to draw up a play for Fernandez. Fernandez was double-teamed and was forced to take an off-balance 18-footer. The ball fell through the hoop with four seconds remaining, and Temple Owls won 66–64. Fernandez and Moore finished with 23 points, a season high for Fernandez.

Temple Owls' season ended on March 19 with a 71–64 loss to second-seeded San Diego State in double overtime. The Aztecs took an 11-point lead in the first half, but Temple Owls recovered. Off a turnover, Lavoy Allen made a seven-footer to tie the game at 54 with 51 seconds left in the second half. Chase Tapley of San Diego State missed a baseline shot at the end of regulation, and the game went into overtime. At the beginning of the first overtime period, Juan Fernandez hit a three-pointer to give the Owls a 57–54 lead. Malcolm Thomas responded with a three-point play to tie the game at 61. Thomas could not hit a shot and the game went into a second overtime. With SDSU maintaining a 69–64 lead, Aztec star Kawhi Leonard stole the ball from Khalif Wyatt and his uncontested dunk assured his team's victory. Ramone Moore had 17 points, and Allen had 12 points and 11 rebounds in his final game as a Temple Owl.

== Statistics ==
The team posted the following statistics:

Name	GP	MIN	MPG	FG	FGA	FG%	3FG	3FGA	3FG%	FT	FTA	FT%	OR	DR	RB	RPG	AST	APG	TO	TPG	STL	SPG	BLK	BPG	PTS	PPG
Ramone Moore	34	1151	33.9	178	398	.447	41	107	.383	120	151	.795	25	118	143	4.2	105	3.1	82	2.4	40	1.2	8	0.2	517	15.2
Lavoy Allen	33	1120	33.9	154	321	.480	5	17	.294	69	99	.697	88	195	283	8.6	75	2.3	54	1.6	23	0.7	61	1.8	382	11.6
Juan Fernandez	30	953	31.8	114	321	.355	50	150	.333	58	72	.896	12	76	88	2.9	117	3.9	64	2.1	23	0.8	2	0.1	336	11.2
Scootie Randall	27	817	30.3	109	220	.495	45	122	.369	26	39	.667	45	82	127	4.7	37	1.4	21	0.8	27	1.0	6	0.2	289	10.7
Khalif Wyatt	34	704	20.7	109	233	.468	48	114	.421	77	101	.762	17	58	75	2.2	57	1.7	44	1.3	45	1.3	7	0.2	343	10.1
Micheal Eric	24	479	20.0	74	151	.490	0	0	.000	22	45	.489	49	93	142	5.9	24	1.0	25	1.0	9	0.4	38	1.6	170	7.1
Rahlir Jefferson	34	897	26.4	71	136	.522	0	1	.000	49	88	.557	75	105	180	5.3	56	1.6	45	1.3	35	1.0	30	0.9	191	5.6
Aaron Brown	29	287	9.9	30	85	.353	11	41	.268	24	38	.632	10	18	28	1.0	12	0.4	10	0.3	7	0.2	0	0.0	95	3.3
T.J. DiLeo	33	430	13.0	27	70	.386	5	28	.179	12	21	.571	10	28	38	1.2	27	0.8	18	0.5	22	0.7	2	0.1	71	2.2
Jake Godino	5	13	2.6	2	5	.400	1	3	.333	1	2	.500	0	1	1	0.2	1	0.2	0	0.0	0	0.0	1	0.2	6	1.2
Dutch Gaitley	11	24	2.2	0	3	.000	0	0	.000	0	0	.000	1	4	5	0.5	0	0.0	0	0.0	0	0.0	1	0.1	0	0.0

== Rankings ==
Ranking movement Legend: ██ Increase in ranking. ██ Decrease in ranking.
Poll	Pre	Wk 1	Wk 2	Wk 3	Wk 4	Wk 5	Wk 6	Wk 7	Wk 8	Wk 9	Wk 10	Wk 11	Wk 12	Wk 13	Wk 14	Wk 15	Wk 16	Wk 17	Wk 18	Final
AP	22	21	21		36T	29	29	25	28	19	26	35	33T	24	23	24	27	24	26	N/A
Coaches	22	20	20	36T	33T	31T	32	27	30	23	28	34	37	27	25	24	27	25	27	26
ESPN.com Power Rankings	26	N/A	N/A			28	31	28T	28	17	26		31	25	24	27	30	N/A	N/A	N/A

== Awards and honors ==
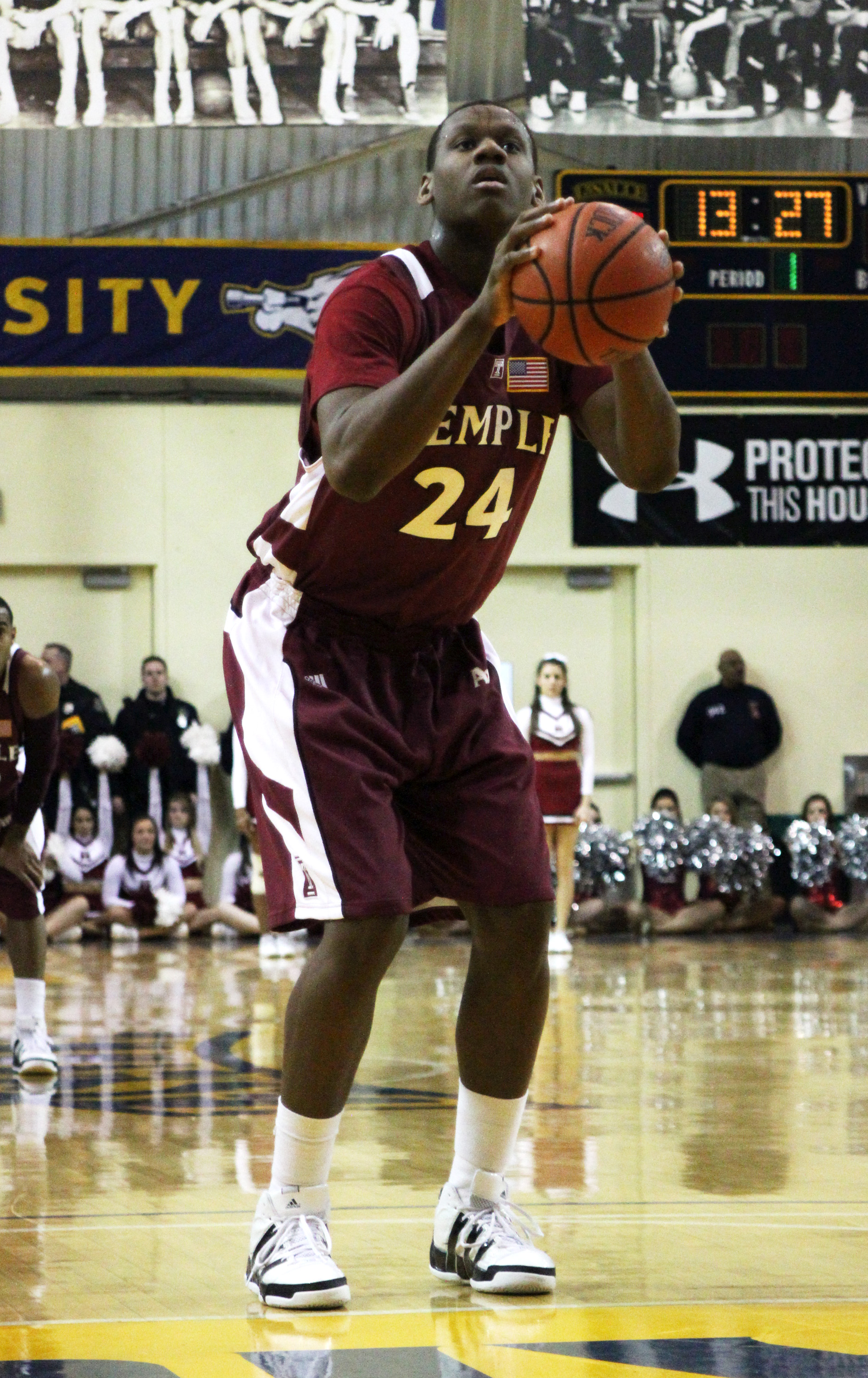
Lavoy Allen was an All-Atlantic 10 First Team honoree.

Lavoy Allen

- Preseason All-Atlantic 10 First Team
- Preseason All-Atlantic 10 Defensive Team
- Preseason John R. Wooden Award Watchlist
- Preseason Naismith College Player of the Year Watchlist
- December 6, 2010 Atlantic 10 Conference Player of the Week
- February 28, 2011 Atlantic 10 Conference Player of the Week
- March 6, 2011 Atlantic 10 Conference Player of the Week
- All-Atlantic 10 First Team
- All-Atlantic 10 Defensive Team
- Philadelphia Big Five Player of the Year
- All-Philadelphia Big Five First Team

Juan Fernandez

- Preseason All-Atlantic 10 Second Team
- Bob Cousy Award Watchlist
- All-Atlantic 10 Third Team
- All-Atlantic 10 Academic Team
- All-Philadelphia Big Five Second Team

Ramone Moore

- All-Atlantic 10 Second Team
- National Association of Basketball Coaches District 4 Second Team
- All-Philadelphia Big Five First Team

Scootie Randall

- February 7, 2011 Atlantic 10 Conference Player of the Week
- All-Atlantic 10 Honorable Mention
- Chris Daniels Most Improved Player of the Year

Khalif Wyatt

- Atlantic 10 Sixth Man of the Year

== NBA draft ==
In the 2011 NBA draft, the Philadelphia 76ers drafted Lavoy Allen in the second round with the 50th pick on June 23. Allen became the 32nd Temple player to be drafted and the first since the New York Knicks selected Mardy Collins with the 29th pick in 2006. "I am very happy for him," said coach Fran Dunphy. "He accomplished so much as a college basketball player. It is a great reward to be drafted, and to go to the Sixers is icing on the cake."
