= DiLeo =

DiLeo is a surname. Notable people with the surname include:

- David DiLeo (born 1997), American basketball player
- Frank DiLeo (1947–2011), American music industry executive and actor
- T. J. DiLeo (born 1990), American-German basketball player
- Tony DiLeo (born 1955), American basketball coach and executive
