= David K. Israel =

American composer

- Israel at Book Soup, August 2026.
- Born: Philadelphia, Pennsylvania, U.S.
- Education: Cinnaminson High School; University of Hartford Hartt School
- Occupations: Composer; author; screenwriter; film producer
- Years active: 1987–present
- Website: www.davidkisrael.me

David K. Israel (born 1967 or 1968) is an American composer, essayist, author, screenwriter, and producer. He has composed music for groups including the American Symphony Orchestra, Twyla Tharp Dance, and the Paul Taylor Dance Company. He has also written columns for The Wall Street Journal, The Washington Post, The Boston Globe and is one of the founding bloggers of Mental Floss. His first novel, Behind Everyman: A Novel for Guys and the Women Who Rescue Them, was published in 2005. Most recently he is the author of the novel, The Lost Mozart.

== Early life ==
Israel was born in Philadelphia and grew up in Cinnaminson Township, New Jersey, where he graduated from Cinnaminson High School. He also studied guitar with jazz artist Pat Martino separately while Martino was recovering from a brain aneurysm. Martino was impressed with Israel's grasp of the guitar and technology and asked if he'd hold off on his college plans, and if he was interested in collaborating on an album. The two would co-write and record an album of songs together in 1987, which is unreleased.

He attended and graduated from the University of Hartford Hartt School. He chose the school because Leonard Bernstein frequented the campus. Israel worked with Jerome Robbins on the Bernstein, Robbins, Guarre, Sondheim project, The Caucasian Chalk Circle.

== Career ==
Israel and Bernstein were scheduled to meet for dinner in 1990, but Bernstein died a month before the meeting. A memorial concert for Bernstein was produced by Israel, who later met Bernstein's former assistant in March 1991, who administered the estate of Bernstein's publishing company. Israel was hired to edit and publish definitive editions of Bernstein works, which included West Side Story and On the Town.

=== Musical composition ===
In 1997, Israel was commissioned by the Paul Taylor Dance Company to compose the score for Prime Numbers, which premiered on January, 10, 1997.

Israel was commissioned again by the Paul Taylor Dance Company to compose the score for The Word, which premiered on March 4, 1998 at New York City Center.

During these years he also fulfilled commissions by such groups as The American Symphony Orchestra and Twyla Tharp Dance.

Israel, with choreographer Silas Farley, collaborated on Architects of Time, the centerpiece of the New York City Ballet's 2022 Stravinsky Festival. Architects of Time premiered on May 5, 2022, and was based on a 1946 musical exchange between George Balanchine and Igor Stravinsky.

During the summer of 2023, Israel worked with choreographer and dancer, Melissa Toogood, to create a new work for the Vail Dance Festival. Willed to the Next Corner, premiered with Sara Mearns, Miriam Miller, India Bradley and Toogood, and the score was performed by Brooklyn Rider.

He was also commissioned by the Colburn School to create a new work with choreographer and dancer, Janie Taylor. The piece, Contour and Flight, premiered in 2023.

vildwerk., a nonprofit organization that raises environmental awareness through the performing arts, commissioned Israel to score the music for Network in 2024 with choreography by Gianna Reisen. He would collaborate with vildwerk. again in 2025 on When the Water Breaks, with choreography by Bradley Shelver.

In addition to his artistic collaborations with vildwerk., Israel has been a founding advisory board member of the organization since 2022.

=== Screenplays and writing ===
In November 2015, it was announced that Israel was writing a film about choreographer George Balanchine.

In September 2017, it was announced that Israel would be co-writing a TV series with director R. J. Cutler about the impeachment of President Bill Clinton. The project was to be produced by Fremantle, and was ordered to series by the History Channel. However, in April 2018, it was announced that the History Channel had cancelled production of the series.

Israel was also announced to be a writer for a series about Wolfgang Amadeus Mozart with director Adam Shankman. Global Road was announced to produce the series, according to an article published in Variety in October 2019.

Israel's first novel, Behind Everyman: A Novel for Guys and the Women Who Rescue Them was published by Random House (Ballantine 2005). In 2026, Israel's next novel, The Lost Mozart, was published by Regalo Press.

His humor columns have appeared in the Los Angeles Times' West Magazine and the Palisadian-Post, and was one of the founding bloggers of Mental Floss, among others. He has also written columns for The Boston Globe, and The Washington Post.

Israel lived in the Pacific Palisades neighborhood of Los Angeles where he produced a series of Sunday Salon concerts. Israel lost his home in the Palisades Fire.

== Selected musical works ==
- Architects of Time, for the New York City Ballet's 2022 Stravinsky Festival with choreographer Silas Farely. (2022)
- Willed to the Next Corner, for the Vail Dance Festival with choreographer Melissa Toogood (2023)
- Contour and Flight, for The Colburn School with choreographer Janie Taylor (2023)
- Network, commissioned by vildwerk. with choreographer Gianna Reisen (2024)
- When the Water Breaks, commissioned by vildwerk. with choreographer Bradley Shelver (2026)

== Selected written works ==
- Behind Everyman: A Novel for Guys and the Women Who Rescue Them, Random House (2005). ISBN 978-0-345-47660-9
- The Lost Mozart, Regalo Press (2026). ISBN 979-8-89565-416-3
