= Nicole Chesney =

American contemporary artist

- Born: 1971 (age 54–55); Cinnaminson, New Jersey
- Education: California College of Arts and Crafts, Massachusetts College of Art and Design, Australian National University
- Known for: Mirrored glass paintings
- Website: nicolechesney.com

Nicole Chesney (born 1971, in Cinnaminson, New Jersey) is an American contemporary artist. She is best known for her mirrored glass paintings and large-scale architectural pieces.

== Early life ==
Nicole Chesney was born and raised in Cinnaminson, New Jersey, in 1971. She studied metalsmithing at the California College of Arts and Crafts from 1992 until 1994. While there she began using glass in her work. In 1997, she graduated from the Massachusetts College of Art and Design with a Bachelor of Fine Arts in Glass, and earned a Master of Arts, Visual Arts, from the Canberra School of Art at the Australian National University in 2000.

== Career ==
After graduation, Chesney was a visiting artist at both the Massachusetts College of Art and Design and the Corning Museum of Glass. In 2003, she moved to Providence, Rhode Island, to establish a studio. Eventually, after working in several spaces, she settled in Sky/Water Studio at Hope Artiste Village. Chesney has participated in a number of group and solo exhibitions. She has also received several honors and awards, including the David Thomas Foundation Grant, 1998; the Canberra School of Art Graduate Award, 1998, 1999, and Drawing Prize, 1999; the Jutta Cuny-Franz Foundation Award, 2001; the UrbanGlass New Talent Award, 2004; and the Rakow Commission, 2005.

Chesney's work is in the permanent collections of several museums, including the Australian National University, the Corning Museum of Glass, Glasmuseet Ebeltoft, the Museum of Fine Arts, Boston, the Montreal Museum of Fine Arts, the Rhode Island School of Design Museum, and the Palm Springs Art Museum.

Her work can be split into two main types: large architectural commissions and smaller-scale pieces. She values glass for its qualities related to light, and primarily uses mirrored glass that is heavily acid-etched. After cutting the glass into the correct size and shape, Chesney treats the surface with a clear glaze. She applies oil paint to the surface using tissue paper, folding or wadding it to create different effects. She then removes some of the paint with cloths or more tissue paper. She observes how the piece changes based on the time of day and type of light. She considers her audience when making a piece, and views them not only as spectators but also participants in the work.

Chesney is inspired by the writings of French philosopher Gaston Bachelard, particularly those related to the sky (or what he calls the "unsilvered mirror"). She referred to the books Water and Dreams and The Right to Dream - both written by Bachelard - while working on her "Sky/Water" series.

== Selected works ==
- Clarus, 7 World Trade Center, New York, New York, 2013
- Kairos, Massachusetts College of Art and Design, Boston, Massachusetts, 2013
- Wheeler Table, Wheeler School, Providence, Rhode Island, 2013
- Welkin, Wheeler School, Providence, Rhode Island, 2009
- Present, 2005 Rakow Commission, Corning Museum of Glass, Corning, New York, 2005
