= Topper Clemons =

American football player (born 1963)

No. 27
- Position: Running back

Personal information
- Born: September 16, 1963 (age 63); Riverside Township, New Jersey, U.S.
- Listed height: 5 ft 11 in (1.80 m)
- Listed weight: 205 lb (93 kg)

Career information
- High school: Cinnaminson (NJ)
- College: Wake Forest
- NFL draft: 1986: 8th round, 212th overall pick

Career history
- Dallas Cowboys (1986)*; Philadelphia Eagles (1987)
- * Offseason or practice squad member only

Career NFL statistics
- Games played: 3
- Stats at Pro Football Reference

Orman Wendell Clemons (born September 16, 1963) is an American former professional football player who was a running back for the Philadelphia Eagles of the National Football League (NFL). He played college football for the Wake Forest Demon Deacons.

== Early life ==
Clemons attended Cinnaminson High School, where he practiced football, wrestling and track. As a senior, he was an All-South Jersey football selection at running back. He finished second in the state meet in both the 100 and 200 metres. He did not lose a regular season wrestling match.

He enrolled at Fork Union Military Academy for a year, where he averaged 100 yards rushing per game.

== College career ==
Clemons accepted a football scholarship from Wake Forest University. As a freshman, he was a backup at running back behind Michael Ramseur. He collected 73 carries for 269 yards, 3 touchdowns, 7 receptions for 46 yards and 23 kickoff returns for 460 yards (20-yard avg.). As a sophomore, he tallied 132 carries for 562 yards, a 4-3-yard average, 6 touchdowns and 6 receptions for 64 yards.

As a junior, he became a starter at fullback, forming with Ramseur one of the best backfield duos in the ACC. He posted 137 carries for 732 yards, a 5.3-yard average (fourth in school history), 2 rushing touchdowns, 15 receptions for 61 yards and one receiving touchdown. He had 182 rushing yards against the University of Richmond.

As a senior, he led the team with 164 carries for 916 yards, a 5.6-yard average (third in school history), 2 rushing touchdowns, 21 receptions for 113 yards and 5 receiving touchdowns. He had 111 rushing yards against the University of Tennessee and 126 rushing yards against the University of Virginia.

He finished his college career with 506 carries for 2,479 yards (third in school history), a 4.9-yard average, 13 rushing touchdowns, six career 100-yard games (tied for seventh in school history), 49 receptions for 284 yards, 6 receiving touchdowns and 3,123 all-purpose yards (fifth in school history).

== Professional career ==
=== Dallas Cowboys ===
Clemons was selected by the Dallas Cowboys in the eighth round (212th overall) of the 1986 NFL draft. He was waived on August 18.

=== Philadelphia Eagles ===
After the National Football League Players Association went on strike in the third week of the 1987 season, the games scheduled for that week were canceled (reducing the 16-game season to 15) and the NFL decided that subsequent games would be played with replacement players. Clemons was signed in October to be a part of the Philadelphia Eagles replacement squad as a backup at running back behind Reggie Brown. In three games, he posted no rushing yards and one reception for a 13-yard touchdown against the Dallas Cowboys. He was cut on October 20, at the end of the strike.

On January 12, 1988, he was re-signed to participate in training camp. He was released on August 22.
