= Cinnaminson Township, New Jersey =

Township in Burlington County, New Jersey, US

- Township
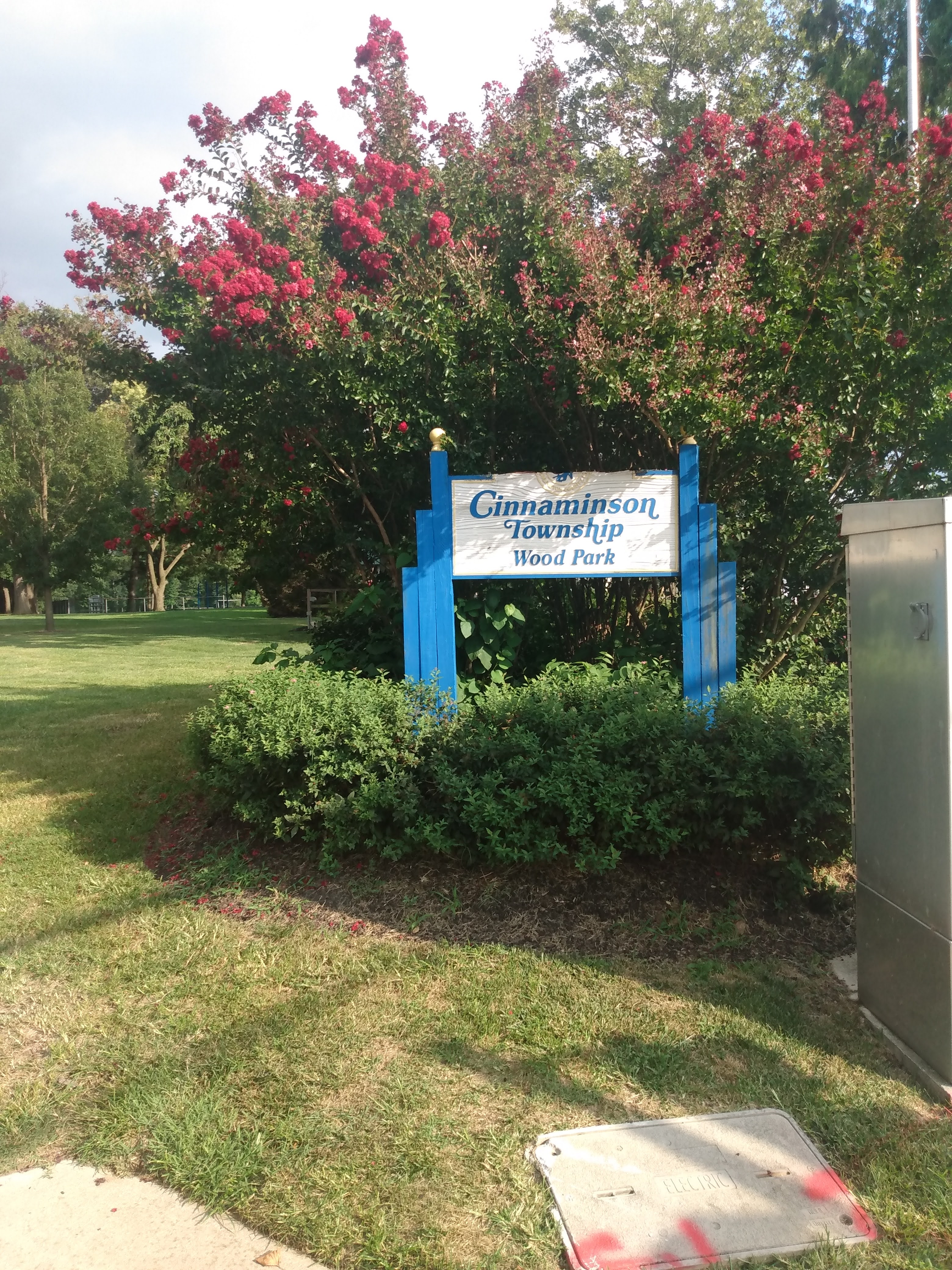
- Wood Park in Cinnaminson

- Seal
- Motto: "Building Our Future... Together"
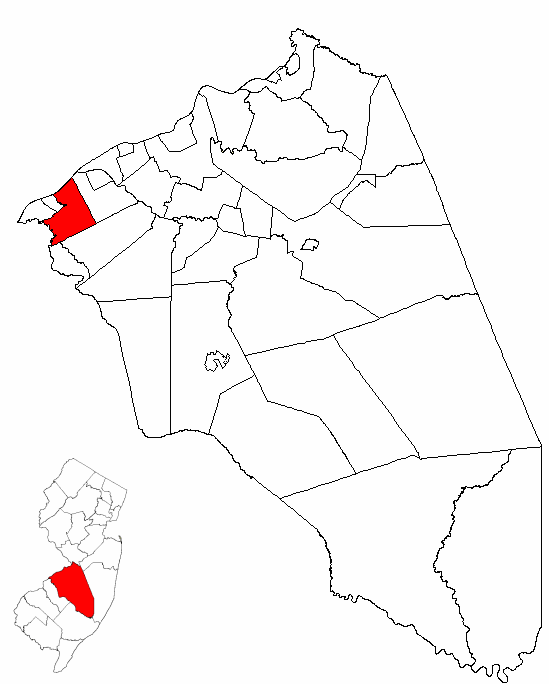
- Location of Cinnaminson Township in Burlington County highlighted in red (right). Inset map: Location of Burlington County in New Jersey highlighted in red (left).

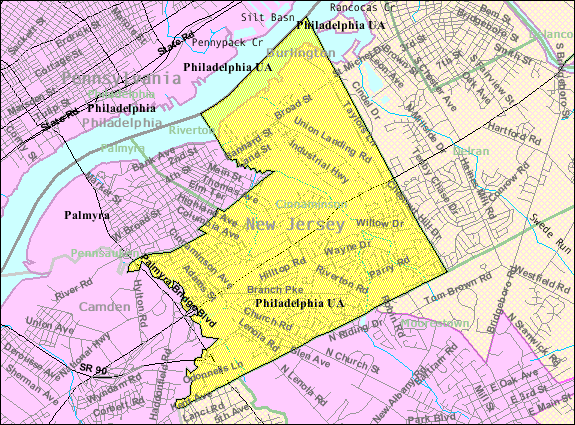
- Census Bureau map of Cinnaminson Township, New Jersey

- Location in Burlington County Location in New Jersey Location in the United States
- Coordinates: 40.000162°N 74.991632°W
- Country: United States
- State: New Jersey
- County: Burlington
- Incorporated: March 15, 1860

Government
  - Type: Township
  - Body: Township Committee
  - Mayor: Ryan Horner (R, December 31, 2026)
  - Administrator: Eric J. Schubiger
  - Municipal clerk: Lisa A. Passione

Area
  - Total: 7.95 sq mi (20.60 km^{2})
  - Land: 7.42 sq mi (19.23 km^{2})
  - Water: 0.53 sq mi (1.37 km^{2}) 6.64%
  - Rank: 233rd of 565 in state 23rd of 40 in county
- Elevation: 79 ft (24 m)

Population (2020)
  - Total: 17,064
  - Estimate (2023): 17,506
  - Rank: 157th of 565 in state 10th of 40 in county
  - Density: 2,298.5/sq mi (887.5/km^{2})
  - Rank: 270th of 565 in state 14th of 40 in county
- Time zone: UTC−05:00 (Eastern (EST))
  - Summer (DST): UTC−04:00 (Eastern (EDT))
- ZIP Code: 08077
- Area code: 856 exchanges: 303, 786, 829
- FIPS code: 3400512940
- GNIS feature ID: 0882096
- Website: www.cinnaminsonnj.org

Cinnaminson Township is a township in Burlington County, in the U.S. state of New Jersey. Cinnaminson Township borders the Delaware River, and is an eastern suburb of Philadelphia. As of the 2020 United States census, the township's population was 17,064, an increase of 1,495 (+9.6%) from the 2010 census count of 15,569, which in turn reflected an increase of 974 (+6.7%) from the 14,595 counted in the 2000 census. The township, and all of Burlington County, is a part of the Philadelphia metropolitan area.

Cinnaminson was incorporated as a township by an act of the New Jersey Legislature on March 15, 1860, from portions of Chester Township (now known as Maple Shade Township). Portions of the township were taken to form Delran Township (February 12, 1880), Riverton (December 18, 1893) and Palmyra (April 19, 1894).

== History ==
Cinnaminson was formed by resolution in 1860 from a section of Chester Township. Part of this resolution reads, "The inhabitants of the township of Chester having become so numerous that it is impracticable for them to meet with convenience and good order in one assembly... the Township shall be divided."

The name "Cinnaminson" is said to derive from the Lenape Native American word "Senamensing," which means "sweet water". Alternatively, the name may derive from Native American words meaning "stone island".

== Geography ==
According to the United States Census Bureau, the township had a total area of 7.95 square miles (20.60 km^{2}), including 7.42 square miles (19.23 km^{2}) of land and 0.53 square miles (1.37 km^{2}) of water (6.64%).

The township borders the municipalities of Delran Township, Maple Shade Township, Moorestown Township, Palmyra and Riverton in Burlington County; Pennsauken Township in Camden County; and Philadelphia across the Delaware River in Pennsylvania.

Cinnaminson includes within its boundaries the confluence point of longitude 75 degrees west and latitude 40 degrees north, one of only four such confluence points in New Jersey. The intersection point is on the 4th fairway of the Riverton Country Club Golf Course, less than 1/2 mile from the Municipal Building.

Unincorporated communities, localities and place names located partially or completely within the township include Bellview, East Riverton, New Albany, North Pennsville, Parry, Taylor and Wrightsville.

== Demographics ==
Historical population
Census	Pop.	Note	%±
1860	2,701		—
1870	3,112		15.2%
1880	2,184	*	−29.8%
1890	2,891		32.4%
1900	1,078	*	−62.7%
1910	1,266		17.4%
1920	1,587		25.4%
1930	2,277		43.5%
1940	2,504		10.0%
1950	3,144		25.6%
1960	8,302		164.1%
1970	16,962		104.3%
1980	16,072		−5.2%
1990	14,583		−9.3%
2000	14,595		0.1%
2010	15,569		6.7%
2020	17,064		9.6%
2023 (est.)	17,506		2.6%
Population sources: 1860–2000 1860–1920; 1860–1870 1870 1880–1890; 1890–1910 1910–1930; 1940–2000 2000; 2010 2020 * = Lost territory in previous decade

=== 2010 census ===
The 2010 United States census counted 15,569 people, 5,535 households, and 4,351 families in the township. The population density was 2,074.5 per square mile (801.0/km^{2}). There were 5,758 housing units at an average density of 767.2 per square mile (296.2/km^{2}). The racial makeup was 89.48% (13,931) White, 5.49% (855) Black or African American, 0.08% (13) Native American, 2.38% (370) Asian, 0.02% (3) Pacific Islander, 0.98% (153) from other races, and 1.57% (244) from two or more races. Hispanic or Latino people of any race were 3.07% (478) of the population.

Of the 5,535 households, 31.1% had children under the age of 18; 66.2% were married couples living together; 8.5% had a female householder with no husband present and 21.4% were non-families. Of all households, 18.0% were made up of individuals and 10.4% had someone living alone who was 65 years of age or older. The average household size was 2.79 and the average family size was 3.18.

Of the population, 22.2% were under the age of 18, 8.4% from 18 to 24, 20.1% from 25 to 44, 31.0% from 45 to 64, and 18.2% who were 65 years of age or older. The median age was 44.5 years. For every 100 females, the population had 96.7 males. For every 100 females ages 18 and older there were 94.2 males.

The Census Bureau's 2006–2010 American Community Survey showed that (in 2010 inflation-adjusted dollars) median household income was $88,470 (with a margin of error of +/− $5,827) and the median family income was $98,579 (+/− $6,301). Males had a median income of $70,565 (+/− $7,423) versus $47,340 (+/− $3,291) for females. The per capita income for the borough was $37,104 (+/− $2,329). About 3.9% of families and 4.7% of the population were below the poverty line, including 5.6% of those under age 18 and 5.1% of those age 65 or over.

=== 2000 census ===
As of the 2000 United States census there were 14,595 people, 5,057 households, and 4,141 families residing in the township. The population density was 1,920.4 people per square mile (741.5 per km^{2}). There were 5,147 housing units at an average density of 677.3 per square mile (261.5 per km^{2}). The racial makeup of the township was 91.36% White, 5.08% African American, 0.16% Native American, 1.88% Asian, 0.01% Pacific Islander, 0.49% from other races, and 1.01% from two or more races. Hispanic or Latino people of any race were 1.53% of the population.

There were 5,057 households, out of which 33.2% had children under the age of 18 living with them, 70.5% were married couples living together, 8.6% had a female householder with no husband present, and 18.1% were non-families. 15.5% of all households were made up of individuals, and 9.5% had someone living alone who was 65 years of age or older. The average household size was 2.85 and the average family size was 3.18.

In the township the population was spread out, with 24.5% under the age of 18, 5.9% from 18 to 24, 24.9% from 25 to 44, 25.5% from 45 to 64, and 19.1% who were 65 years of age or older. The median age was 42 years. For every 100 women, there were 95.3 men. For every 100 women age 18 and over, there were 91.7 men.

The median income for a household in the township was $68,474, and the median income for a family was $75,920. Men had a median income of $57,122 versus $41,286 for women. The per capita income for the township was $29,863. About 1.4% of families and 2.4% of the population were below the poverty line, including 2.0% of those under age 18 and 3.5% of those age 65 or over.

== Arts and culture ==
Cinnaminson is home to the Burlington County Footlighters, a community theatre company founded in 1938 who perform regularly at a playhouse within the township. Cinnaminson also has an all-ages regional chorus and wind ensemble.

== Parks and recreation ==
Since 1900, Cinnaminson has been home to the Riverton Country Club, a country club and golf course designed by Donald Ross.

== Government ==
=== Local government ===
Cinnaminson Township is governed under the township form of New Jersey municipal government, one of 141 municipalities (of the 564) statewide that use this form, the second-most commonly used form of government in the state. The Township Committee is comprised of five members, who are elected directly by the voters at-large in partisan elections to serve three-year terms of office on a staggered basis, with either one or two seats coming up for election each year as part of the November general election in a three-year cycle. At an annual reorganization meeting, the Township Committee selects one of its members to serve as mayor and another as deputy mayor.

As of 2026, members of the Cinnaminson Township Committee are Mayor Ryan Horner (R, term on committee and as mayor ends December 31, 2026), Deputy Mayor Albert D. Segrest (R, term on committee ends December 31, 2027; term as deputy mayor ends 2026), Ernest McGill (R, 2026), Paul J. Conda (R, 2027), and Corinne Taylor-Walls (D, 2028). In November 2025, Taylor-Walls became the first Democrat elected in decades and first African American elected to the Township Committee, beating then-mayor Stephanie Kravil by 88 votes.

=== Federal, state and county representation ===
For the 119th United States Congress, New Jersey's 3rd congressional district is currently represented Herb Conaway (D, Delran Township). New Jersey is represented in the United States Senate by Democrats Cory Booker (Newark, term ends 2027) and Andy Kim (Moorestown, term ends 2031). For the 2026–2027 session, the 7th legislative district of the New Jersey Legislature is represented in the State Senate by Troy Singleton (D, Palmyra) and in the General Assembly by Carol A. Murphy (D, Mount Laurel) and Balvir Singh (D, Burlington Township). Burlington County is governed by a Board of County Commissioners comprised of five members who are chosen at-large in partisan elections to serve three-year terms of office on a staggered basis, with either one or two seats coming up for election each year; at an annual reorganization meeting, the board selects a director and deputy director from among its members to serve a one-year term. As of 2026, Burlington County's Commissioners are: Director Felicia Hopson (D, Willingboro Township, term as commissioner ends December 31, 2027; term as director ends 2026), Deputy Director Allison Eckel (D, Medford, term as commissioner ends 2028; term as deputy director ends 2026), Randy Brolo (D, Lumberton, 2026; elected to an unexpired term), Tyler Burrell (D, Delran Township, 2027) and Tom Pullion (D, Edgewater Park, 2026).

Burlington County's constitutional officers are Clerk Joanne Schwartz (D, Southampton Township, 2028), Sheriff James H. Kostoplis (D, Bordentown, 2028) and Surrogate Brian J. Carlin (D, Burlington Township, 2026).

Cinnaminson Township is located in the 3rd Congressional District and is part of New Jersey's 7th state legislative district.

=== Politics ===
United States presidential election results for Cinnnaminson Township 2024 2020 2016 2012 2008 2004
Year	Republican		Democratic		Third party(ies)	
Year	No.	%	No.	%	No.	%
2024	4,109	46.06%	4,691	52.58%	121	1.36%
2020	4,800	44.83%	5,760	53.79%	148	1.38%
2016	4,203	46.02%	4,589	50.25%	341	3.73%
2012	4,283	48.82%	4,391	50.05%	99	1.13%
2008	4,315	48.22%	4,538	50.72%	95	1.06%
2004	4,297	50.52%	4,122	48.47%	86	1.01%

As of March 2011, there were a total of 10,724 registered voters in Cinnnaminson Township, of which 3,191 (29.8% vs. 33.3% countywide) were registered as Democrats, 3,159 (29.5% vs. 23.9%) were registered as Republicans and 4,369 (40.7% vs. 42.8%) were registered as Unaffiliated. There were 5 voters registered as Libertarians or Greens. Among the township's 2010 Census population, 68.9% (vs. 61.7% in Burlington County) were registered to vote, including 88.6% of those ages 18 and over (vs. 80.3% countywide).

Gubernatorial election results for Cinnaminson Township
Year	Republican		Democratic		Third party(ies)	
Year	No.	%	No.	%	No.	%
2025	3,597	43.97%	4,550	55.62%	34	0.42%
2021	3,291	50.83%	3,164	48.87%	19	0.29%
2017	2,406	47.62%	2,564	50.74%	83	1.64%
2013	3,849	69.14%	1,666	29.93%	52	0.93%
2009	3,249	54.74%	2,308	38.89%	378	6.37%
2005	2,791	49.50%	2,679	47.52%	168	2.98%

In the 2012 presidential election, Democrat Barack Obama received 4,391 votes here (49.9% vs. 58.1% countywide), ahead of Republican Mitt Romney with 4,283 votes (48.6% vs. 40.2%) and other candidates with 99 votes (1.1% vs. 1.0%), among the 8,807 ballots cast by the township's 11,261 registered voters, for a turnout of 78.2% (vs. 74.5% in Burlington County). In the 2008 presidential election, Democrat Barack Obama received 4,538 votes here (50.4% vs. 58.4% countywide), ahead of Republican John McCain with 4,315 votes (47.9% vs. 39.9%) and other candidates with 95 votes (1.1% vs. 1.0%), among the 8,999 ballots cast by the township's 10,782 registered voters, for a turnout of 83.5% (vs. 80.0% in Burlington County). In the 2004 presidential election, Republican George W. Bush received 4,297 votes here (50.3% vs. 46.0% countywide), ahead of Democrat John Kerry with 4,122 votes (48.3% vs. 52.9%) and other candidates with 86 votes (1.0% vs. 0.8%), among the 8,535 ballots cast by the township's 10,435 registered voters, for a turnout of 81.8% (vs. 78.8% in the whole county).

In the 2013 gubernatorial election, Republican Chris Christie received 3,849 votes here (68.0% vs. 61.4% countywide), ahead of Democrat Barbara Buono with 1,666 votes (29.5% vs. 35.8%) and other candidates with 52 votes (0.9% vs. 1.2%), among the 5,657 ballots cast by the township's 11,392 registered voters, yielding a 49.7% turnout (vs. 44.5% in the county). In the 2009 gubernatorial election, Republican Chris Christie received 3,249 votes here (54.3% vs. 47.7% countywide), ahead of Democrat Jon Corzine with 2,308 votes (38.5% vs. 44.5%), Independent Chris Daggett with 321 votes (5.4% vs. 4.8%) and other candidates with 57 votes (1.0% vs. 1.2%), among the 5,988 ballots cast by the township's 10,806 registered voters, yielding a 55.4% turnout (vs. 44.9% in the county).

United States Senate election results for Cinnaminson Township1
Year	Republican		Democratic		Third party(ies)	
Year	No.	%	No.	%	No.	%
2024	3,659	42.26%	4,901	56.60%	99	1.14%
2018	3,794	48.54%	3,601	46.07%	421	5.39%
2012	3,996	47.78%	4,293	51.33%	75	0.90%
2006	2,864	51.27%	2,634	47.15%	88	1.58%

United States Senate election results for Cinnaminson Township2
Year	Republican		Democratic		Third party(ies)	
Year	No.	%	No.	%	No.	%
2020	4,812	46.12%	5,524	52.95%	97	0.93%
2014	2,638	53.05%	2,271	45.67%	64	1.29%
2013	1,684	53.48%	1,430	45.41%	35	1.11%
2008	4,042	48.91%	4,130	49.98%	92	1.11%

== Education ==
The Cinnaminson Township Public Schools serves students in pre-kindergarten through twelfth grade. As of the 2021–22 school year, the district, comprised of five schools, had an enrollment of 2,736 students and 226.1 classroom teachers (on an FTE basis), for a student–teacher ratio of 12.1:1. Schools in the district (with 2021–22) enrollment data from the National Center for Education Statistics are Cinnaminson Memorial School with 41 students in PreK, New Albany Elementary School with 584 students in grades PreK–2, Eleanor Rush Intermediate School with 621 students in grades 3–5, Cinnaminson Middle School with 651 students in grades 6–8 and Cinnaminson High School with 822 students in grades 9–12. The Project Challenge program is a program for gifted students from grades 2 through 8 who attend New Albany Elementary School, Eleanor Rush Intermediate School and Cinnaminson Middle School.

The school district is governed by a nine-member elected board of education. The superintendent of schools is Stephen M. Cappello and the business administrator / board secretary is Melissa Livengood.

Students from Cinnaminson Township, and from all of Burlington County, are eligible to attend the Burlington County Institute of Technology, a countywide public school district that serves the vocational and technical education needs of students at the high school and post-secondary level at its campuses in Medford and Westampton. All costs associated with attending the school are paid by the home school district, which is also responsible for student transportation to and from the school.

=== Private schools ===
Cinnaminson Township is home to several private schools. The historic Westfield Friends School, which serves students from Pre-K–8th grade, is a Quaker school founded in 1788. St. Charles Borromeo Parish School serves about 300 students in Pre-K–8th grade from several area communities, operating as part of the Roman Catholic Diocese of Trenton.

== Transportation ==
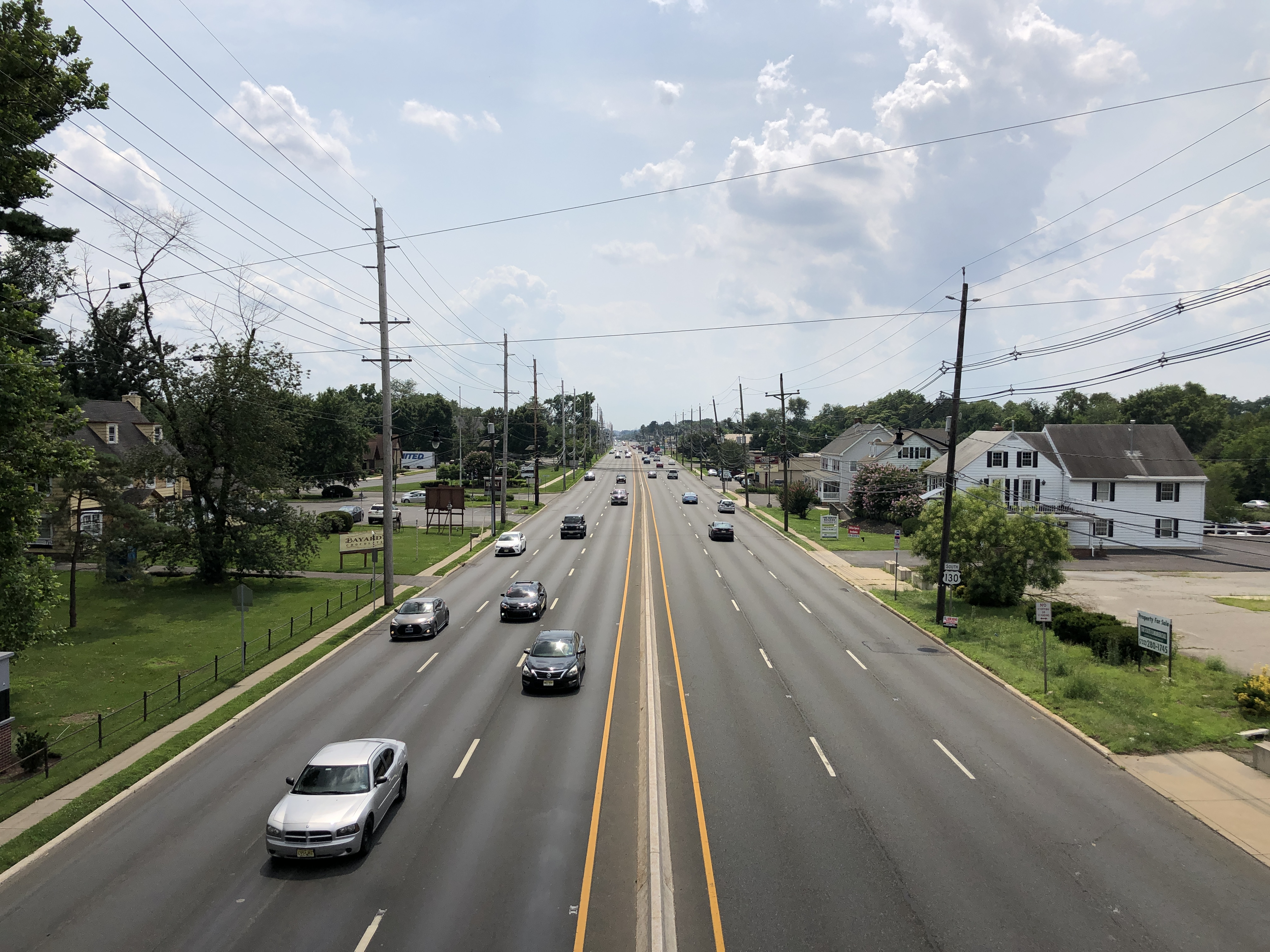
U.S. Route 130 in Cinnaminson

=== Roads and highways ===
As of May 2010, the township had a total of 80.63 miles (129.76 km) of roadways, of which 67.47 miles (108.58 km) were maintained by the municipality, 9.29 miles (14.95 km) by Burlington County and 3.87 miles (6.23 km) by the New Jersey Department of Transportation.

State and county roadways traveling through the township include Route 73, Route 90, U.S. Route 130 and County Route 543.

=== Public transportation ===
The Cinnaminson station located on Broad Street offers southbound service on the River Line light rail system to Camden and the Walter Rand Transportation Center (with transfers available to the PATCO Speedline) and northbound service to the Trenton Transit Center with connections to NJ Transit trains to New York City, SEPTA trains to Philadelphia, and Amtrak trains.

NJ Transit provides bus service on the 409 and 417 route between Trenton and Philadelphia, and on the 419 route between Camden and Burlington.

BurLink bus service is offered on the B9 route (between the Palmyra station and the Moorestown Mall) and the B10 route (between Cinnaminson station and Route 130 / Union Landing Road).

== Notable people ==
People who were born in, residents of, or otherwise closely associated with Cinnaminson Township include:

- Samuel Leeds Allen (1841–1918), inventor and manufacturer of the Flexible Flyer sled
- Danny Cage (born 1973), retired professional wrestler and trainer who runs the Monster Factory professional wrestling school
- Nicole Chesney (born 1971), contemporary artist known for her mirrored glass paintings and large-scale architectural commissions
- Brad Childress (born 1956), former Philadelphia Eagles offensive coordinator and former Minnesota Vikings head coach
- Andre Collins (born 1968), director of retired players with the National Football League Players' Association, All-American football star at Penn State, and 10-year NFL linebacker
- Jim DeRose (born c. 1967), college soccer coach at Bradley University
- Max DiLeo (born 1993), professional basketball player for Baskets Oldenburg of the German Basketball Bundesliga
- T. J. DiLeo (born 1990), professional basketball player
- Tony DiLeo (born 1955), former head coach of the Philadelphia 76ers
- John Thompson Dorrance (1873–1930), chemist who created condensed soup and served as president of the Campbell's from 1914 to 1930
- Larry Ferrari (1932–1997), musician, television pioneer and host of the Larry Ferrari Show
- Nat Gertler (born 1965), writer known for his comics and books about comics
- Matt Gono (born 1995), professional football player for the New York Giants
- Mary Parry Haines (1826–1884), naturalist and paleontologist
- Darrell Hazell (born 1964), former head coach of the Kent State Golden Flashes football and Purdue Boilermakers football teams
- Cam Horsley, professional football defensive tackle for the Tennessee Titans
- Barbara Haney Irvine (born 1944), advocate for the preservation of women's historic sites, who has served as executive director of the New Jersey Historic Trust
- David K. Israel (born 1967/68), composer, essayist, author, screenwriter and producer
- Stephen Kasprzyk (born 1982), rower who competed in the men's eight event at the 2012 Summer Olympics
- Michelle Kosinski (born 1974), Emmy Award-winning foreign correspondent for NBC News, former resident
- George W. Lee (1931–2007), politician who served as acting secretary of state of New Jersey in 1977 before his conviction for accepting illegal campaign contributions
- George A. Palmer (1895–1981), clergyman and radio broadcaster who began his ministry at Asbury Methodist Church in Cinnaminson
- Gervase Peterson (born 1969), contestant on Survivor: Borneo, the first edition of the CBS reality television series Survivor
- Brian Propp (born 1959), National Hockey League left-winger for 15 seasons, radio broadcaster, businessman, philanthropist and Philadelphia Flyers Hall of Fame inductee
- Walter Newton Read (1918–2001), second chairman of the New Jersey Casino Control Commission, 1982–1989
- Bradford S. Smith (born 1950), politician who served in the New Jersey Senate from 1992 to 1994 before serving for four years as the fourth chairman of the New Jersey Casino Control Commission
- Joseph Hooton Taylor Jr. (born 1941), astrophysicist and Princeton University professor who was the 1993 Nobel laureate in Physics
- Mark Zagunis (born 1993), professional baseball player
- Jason "Mew2King" Zimmerman (born 1989), professional Super Smash Bros. player

Preceded by Delran Township	Bordering communities of Philadelphia	Succeeded by Riverton
