= Max DiLeo =

American-German basketball player

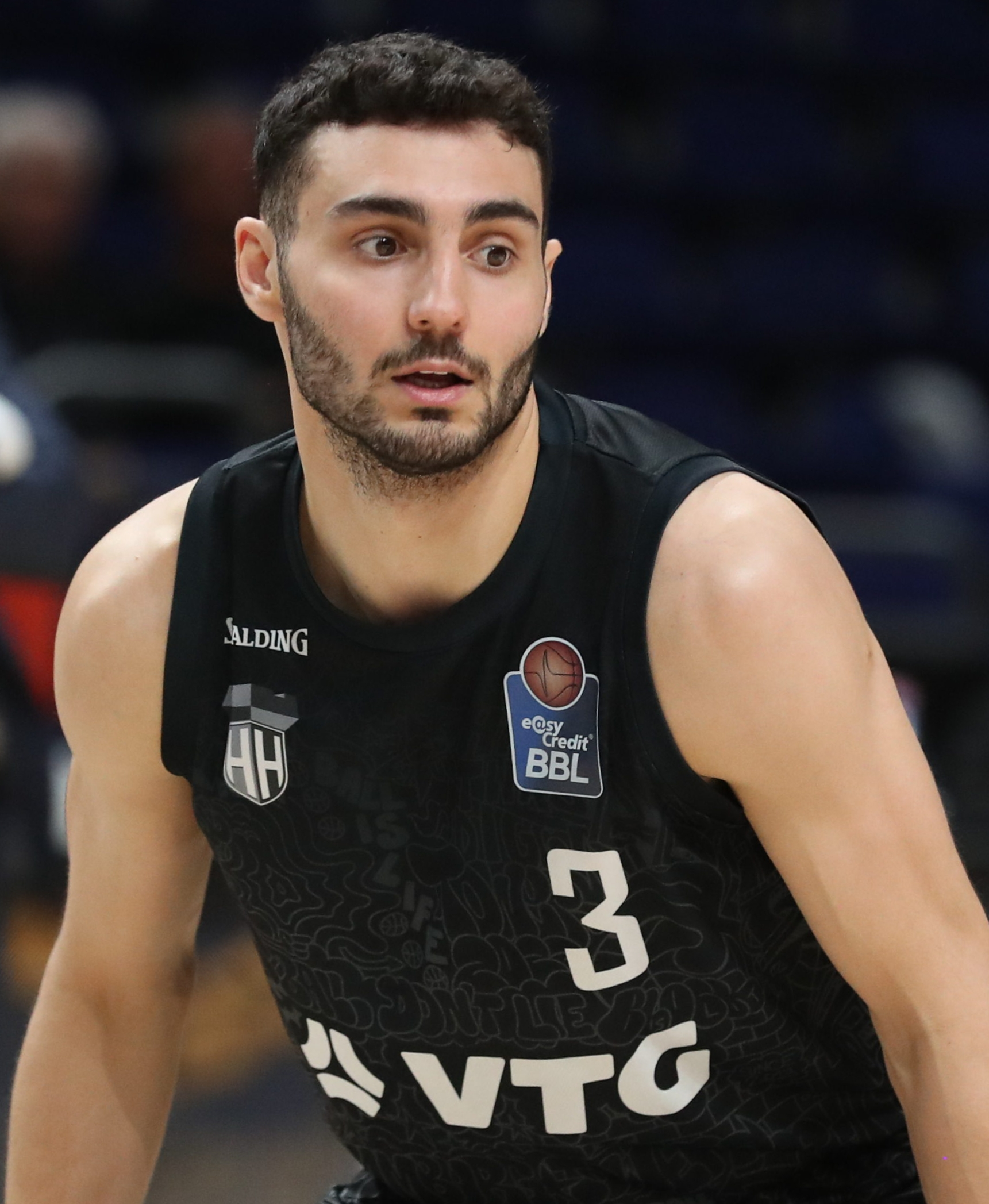

Free agent
- Position: Guard

Personal information
- Born: March 12, 1993 (age 33) Philadelphia, Pennsylvania, U.S.
- Listed height: 1.85 m (6 ft 1 in)
- Listed weight: 83 kg (183 lb)

Career information
- High school: Cinnaminson (Cinnaminson Township, New Jersey)
- College: Monmouth (2011–2015)
- NBA draft: 2015: undrafted
- Playing career: 2015–present

Career history
- 2015–2017: Oettinger Rockets
- 2017–2018: RheinStars Köln
- 2018–2020: SC Rasta Vechta
- 2020–2022: Hamburg Towers
- 2022–2025: EWE Baskets Oldenburg

Maximilian Lewis DiLeo (born March 12, 1993) is an American-German professional basketball player who last played for EWE Baskets Oldenburg of the German Basketball Bundesliga (BBL). He plays the guard position.

== Early life ==
DiLeo was born on March 12, 1993, in Philadelphia. After his family moved to Cinnaminson Township, New Jersey, DiLeo went to Cinnaminson High School, where he starred for four years. DiLeo played multiple sports in high school, including soccer and track and field.

== College career ==
After being lightly recruited after his high school career, DiLeo began his collegiate career as a walk-on at Monmouth University. Following his junior year at Monmouth, DiLeo was named team captain and earned a scholarship heading into his senior year.

== Professional career ==
DiLeo began his professional career signing a two-year contract, with German club Oettinger Rockets heading into the 2015–16 season. In June 2017, DiLeo left Rockets, and signed with club RheinStars Köln for the 2017–18 season.

After his lone season with RheinStars Köln, DiLeo signed a two-year contract with SC Rasta Vechta, entering the 2018–19 season.

In July 2020, DiLeo signed with Hamburg, prior to the 2020–21 campaign. For the following season, DiLeo was given a one-year extension by the club.

In June 2022, DiLeo left Hamburg, and signed a two-year contract with Oldenburg through the 2023–24 season.

== National team career ==
DiLeo is a dual national who represents the Germany national team. He made his debut during their 2023 FIBA World Cup qualifying campaign in February 2022.

== Personal life ==
DiLeo is the son of former NBA coach and executive Tony DiLeo, and former German professional basketball player Anna DiLeo. His older brother T. J. and his cousin David also played basketball professionally.
