= Mary Parry Haines =

American paleontologist, botanist and botanical collector

- Born: December 24, 1826; Cinnaminson, New Jersey, U.S.
- Died: December 8, 1884 (aged 57)
- Burial place: Earlham Cemetery
- Occupation: Paleontologist
- Spouse: Joshua W. Haines
- Children: 3
- Parents: Letitia Penn Smith; John D. Parry

Mary Parry Haines (December 24, 1826 – December 8, 1884) was a naturalist and paleontologist, known for her contributions to the botany of the central part of Eastern Indiana. She published articles in the fields of geology and botany. She also served as the Custodian of the Paleontology Department of the Museum of the Scientific Association of Richmond, Indiana and a member of the Indiana Horticultural Society. Haines' work as a collector of specimens was praised and recognized by other scientists after her death.

== Early and personal life ==
Mary Parry was born in Cinnaminson, New Jersey to Letitia Penn Smith, sister of U.S. Senator Oliver H. Smith, and John D. Parry. She married Joshua W. Haines, a former teacher in Wayne County, Indiana and a successful dry goods merchant in Richmond, Indiana, in 1852. Mary and Joshua had three children together: Letitia, Parry, and Francinia.

== Career in science ==
As a botanist, Haines made plant-oriented presentations to various horticultural societies in Indiana. She was best known for her fossil collections and was named the curator of the paleontological collection in the museum of the Scientific Association of Richmond, Indiana, when it was incorporated in 1875. By 1879, her personal natural history repository comprised over 5,100 specimens that included 1,628 fossils and 1,016 minerals, as well as many shells, corals, and noteworthy botanical specimens from Indiana.

Haines assembled a group of bryophyte/lichen specimens from the Richmond area and judging from the collection dates present on her specimens listed in the iDigBio and SEINet databases, she did most of her collecting during the 1870s. Haines' overall bryophyte/lichen herbarium (composed of her own specimens and others she obtained via exchange) bore collection dates from 1820 to 1879. During her lifetime, she published scholarly works on bryophytes, geology, and ferns.

She was also a correspondent of William H. Pratt, curator at the Davenport Academy of Natural Sciences, and was elected a corresponding member of the Academy in 1874. Over time, Haines donated fossils, geological specimens, shells, beads, and other artifacts to the Davenport Academy.

== Death and burial ==
Haines died in 1884 and in buried in Earlham Cemetery in Richmond, Indiana.
