= Cinnaminson Township Public Schools =

School district in Burlington County, New Jersey, US

Address
- 2195 Riverton Road Cinnaminson Township, Burlington County, New Jersey, 08077; United States
- Coordinates: 39.998812°N 74.995611°W

District information
- Grades: PreK-12
- Superintendent: Stephen M. Cappello
- Business administrator: Melissa Wilke
- Schools: 5

Students and staff
- Enrollment: 2,736 (as of 2021–22)
- Faculty: 226.1 FTEs
- Student–teacher ratio: 12.1:1

Other information
- District Factor Group: FG
- Website: www.cinnaminson.com
Ind.	Per pupil	District spending	Rank (*)	K-12 average	%± vs. average
1A	Total Spending	$18,620	45	$18,891	−1.4%
1	Budgetary Cost	14,860	50	14,783	0.5%
2	Classroom Instruction	8,426	41	8,763	−3.8%
6	Support Services	2,351	50	2,392	−1.7%
8	Administrative Cost	1,566	41	1,485	5.5%
10	Operations & Maintenance	1,708	42	1,783	−4.2%
13	Extracurricular Activities	652	66	268	143.3%
16	Median Teacher Salary	65,678	45	64,043
Data from NJDoE 2014 Taxpayers' Guide to Education Spending. *Of K-12 districts with 1,800-3,500 students. Lowest spending=1; Highest=68

The Cinnaminson Township Public Schools is a comprehensive community public school district that serves students in pre-kindergarten through twelfth grade from Cinnaminson Township, in Burlington County, in the U.S. state of New Jersey.

As of the 2021–22 school year, the district, comprised of five schools, had an enrollment of 2,736 students and 226.1 classroom teachers (on an FTE basis), for a student–teacher ratio of 12.1:1.

The Project Challenge program is a program for gifted students from grades 2 through 8 who attend New Albany Elementary School, Eleanor Rush Intermediate School and Cinnaminson Middle School, where students can learn more while having fun. Project Challenge was conceived by Elaine Mendelow, a teacher in the district, who taught it for over 20 years, now being retired from the program.

== History ==
In 1948, during de jure educational segregation in the United States, the district had a school for black children. In 1948 there were two shifts of first grade classes as the black school had a relatively large student count. The white and black schools were located near one another.

The district had been classified by the New Jersey Department of Education as being in District Factor Group "FG", the fourth-highest of eight groupings. District Factor Groups organize districts statewide to allow comparison by common socioeconomic characteristics of the local districts. From lowest socioeconomic status to highest, the categories are A, B, CD, DE, FG, GH, I and J.

== Schools ==
Schools in the district (with 2021–22 enrollment data from the National Center for Education Statistics) are:

Preschool

- Cinnaminson Memorial School with 41 students in PreK

Elementary schools

- New Albany Elementary School with 584 students in grades PreK to 2
  - Valerie Jones, principal
- Eleanor Rush Intermediate School with 621 students in grades 3 to 5
  - Kate Mele, principal

Middle school

- Cinnaminson Middle School with 651 students in grades 6 to 8
  - Kerry DiSimone, principal

High school

- Cinnaminson High School with 822 students in grades 9 to 12
  - Ryan Gorman, principal

== Administration ==
Core members of the district's administration are:

- Stephen M. Cappello, Superintendent of Schools
- Melissa Wilke, Business Administrator/Board Secretary

== Board of education ==
The district's board of education, comprised of nine members, sets policy and oversees the fiscal and educational operation of the district through its administration. As a Type II school district, the board's trustees are elected directly by voters to serve three-year terms of office on a staggered basis, with three seats up for election each year held (since 2012) as part of the November general election. The board appoints a superintendent to oversee the district's day-to-day operations and a business administrator to supervise the business functions of the district.
