= David DiLeo =

American basketball player (born 1997)

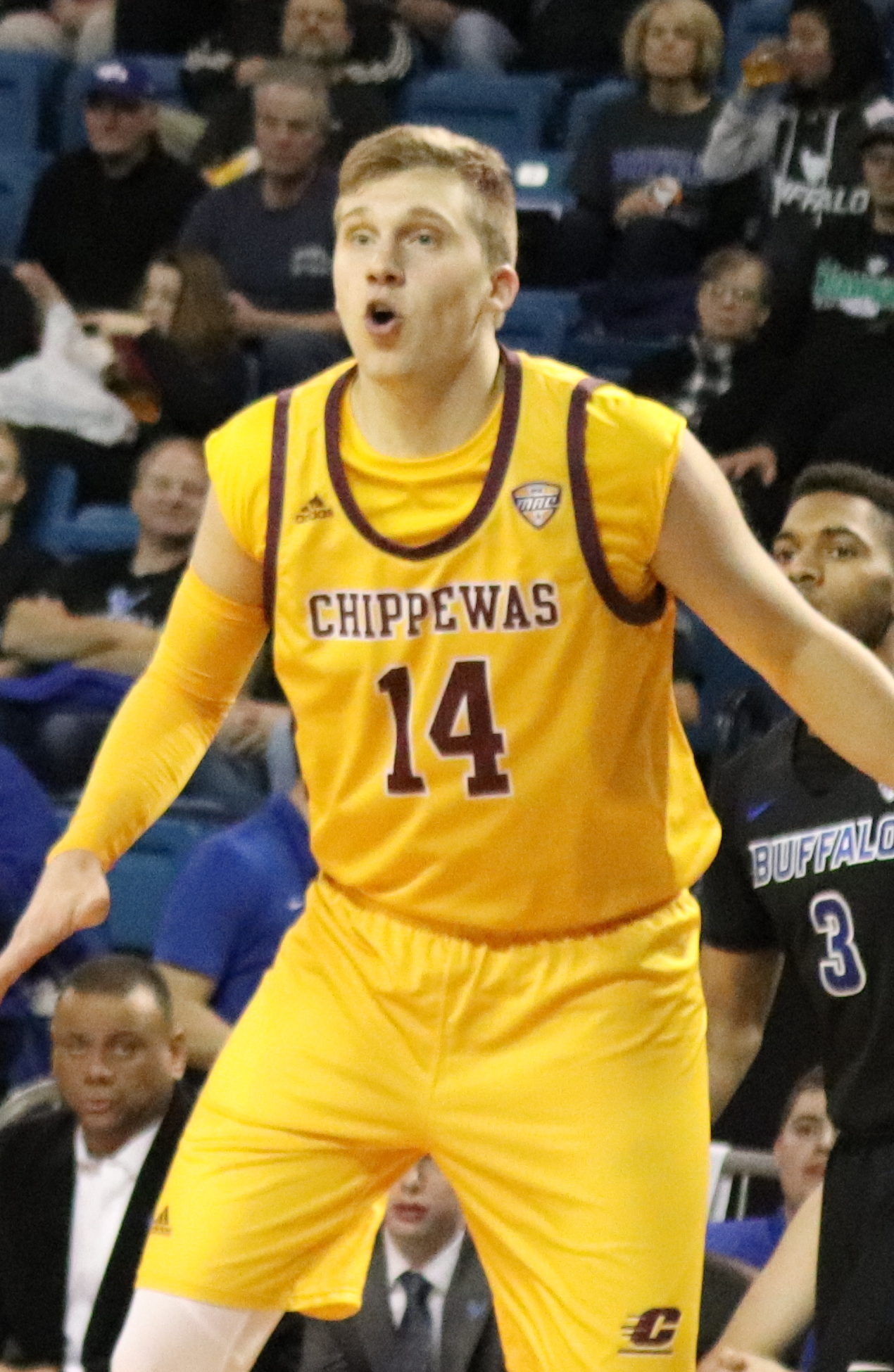
- DiLeo with Central Michigan in 2020

No. 51 – Bahçeşehir Koleji
- Position: Small forward / power forward
- League: BSL; EuroCup

Personal information
- Born: February 28, 1997 (age 29)
- Listed height: 6 ft 8 in (2.03 m)
- Listed weight: 224 lb (102 kg)

Career information
- High school: Iowa City West (Iowa City, Iowa); New Hampton School (New Hampton, New Hampshire)
- College: Central Michigan (2016–2020)
- NBA draft: 2020: undrafted
- Playing career: 2020–present

Career history
- 2020–2021: UCAM Murcia
- 2021–2022: PAOK Thessaloniki
- 2022–2023: Czarni Słupsk
- 2023–2024: ESSM Le Portel
- 2024–2026: Le Mans
- 2026–present: Bahçeşehir Koleji

Career highlights
- French League Cup winner (2025)

David DiLeo (born February 28, 1997) is an American professional basketball player for Bahçeşehir Koleji of the Turkish Basketbol Süper Ligi (BSL) and the EuroCup. He played college basketball for the Central Michigan Chippewas.

== High school career ==
As a child, DiLeo enjoyed shooting the basketball from long range, but his parents encouraged him to develop his complete game. DiLeo attended Iowa City West High School. He helped the team win three state championships and became a starter as a junior, averaging 12.5 points per game. As a senior, DiLeo averaged 15.3 points and 4.5 rebounds per game while shooting 44.5 percent from 3-point range, helping the team to a 25–1 record and a third-place finish at the Class 4A state tournament. DiLeo was named 2015 Iowa City Press-Citizen boys' basketball player of the year. He also played on the tennis team and won three state titles and a doubles state title. After graduating from high school, DiLeo played a postgraduate year at New Hampton School in New Hampshire.

== College career ==
DiLeo played college basketball at Central Michigan. He averaged 8.5 points and 5.0 rebounds per game as a freshman. In his third career start as a sophomore, a 103–68 win over Eureka College, DiLeo scored 28 points. As a sophomore, DiLeo averaged 12.4 points and 6.6 rebounds per game, leading the conference in three-pointers with 96. DiLeo posted 24 points and 10 rebounds in a win against Western Michigan. He averaged 12.1 points and 4.9 rebounds per game as a junior, helping the Chippewas to a 23–12 record. As a senior, he averaged 14.5 points and 5.1 rebounds per game, shooting 40% from three-point range. DiLeo was named an All-MAC honorable mention and was selected to the All-District 14 Second Team by the National Association of Basketball Coaches. He set the MAC record with 337 career 3-pointers and finished seventh in Central Michigan history in rebounds (733) and eighth in career points (1,604).

== Professional career ==
On June 29, 2020, DiLeo signed with UCAM Murcia of the Spanish Liga ACB. In 19 games, DiLeo averaged 8.1 points, shooting with 37% from the 3-point line, 54.5% from the field and 90% from the free throw line, playing around 18 minutes per contest. In January 2021, he suffered an injury on his right hand that prematurely ended his season.

On July 13, 2021, DiLeo signed with PAOK Thessaloniki of the Greek Basket League. In 24 league games, he averaged 9.5 points (shooting with 39% from the 3-point line) and 3.9 rebounds, playing around 21 minutes per contest.

July 2021 played in the NBA Summer League with the New Orleans Pelicans July 2022 played in the NBA Summer League with the Indiana Pacers

July 2021 played with the Aftershocks in The Basketball Tournament (TBT)

On July 25, 2022, Czarni Słupsk of the Polish Basketball League announced his signing.

On June 14, 2023, he signed with ESSM Le Portel of the French LNB Pro A.

On June 4, 2024, he signed with Le Mans of the LNB Pro A.

On July 9, 2026, DiLeo signed a one–year contract with Bahçeşehir Koleji of the Turkish Basketbol Süper Ligi (BSL).

== Personal life ==
DiLeo's father Frank played college basketball at Lafayette and served as an assistant coach at Virginia and Iowa before becoming a scout for the Philadelphia 76ers. His mother Kay coached women's basketball at Indiana State. DiLeo is a cousin of T. J. DiLeo and Max DiLeo, his uncle is Tony DiLeo.

In July 2025, DiLeo engaged to professional basketball player Megan Gustafson. On July 18, 2026, DiLeo and Gustafson got married at Bella Sala in Tiffin, Iowa.
