= Andre Collins =

American football player (born 1968)

No. 55, 52, 53
- Position: Linebacker

Personal information
- Born: May 4, 1968 (age 58); Riverside Township, New Jersey, U.S.
- Listed height: 6 ft 1 in (1.85 m)
- Listed weight: 240 lb (109 kg)

Career information
- High school: Cinnaminson (NJ)
- College: Penn State
- NFL draft: 1990: 2nd round, 46th overall pick

Career history
- Washington Redskins (1990–1994); Cincinnati Bengals (1995–1997); Chicago Bears (1998); Detroit Lions (1999)

Awards and highlights
- Super Bowl champion (XXVI); National champion (1986); First-team All-American (1989); First-team All-East (1989)

Career NFL statistics
- Tackles: 753
- Sacks: 25.5
- Interceptions: 13
- Stats at Pro Football Reference

Andre Pierre Collins (born May 4, 1968) is an American former professional football player who was a linebacker for 10 seasons in the National Football League (NFL). He started in Super Bowl XXVI for the Washington Redskins. Collins currently serves as director of retired players for the National Football League Players Association (NFLPA), where he works to ensure retirees make successful post-football transitions.

A standout inside linebacker playing college football for the Penn State Nittany Lions, Collins was named a 1989 All-American and a Butkus Award finalist. He attended Cinnaminson High School in Cinnaminson Township, New Jersey. Collins was in the first group of inductees to the Cinnaminson High School Athletics Hall of Fame. He was selected by Washington in the second round of the 1990 NFL draft.. He intercepted Brett Favre’s first pass in the NFL.

Pre-draft measurables
Height	Weight	Arm length	Hand span	40-yard dash	10-yard split	20-yard split	20-yard shuttle	Vertical jump
6 ft 1 1/2 in (1.87 m)	224 lb (102 kg)	31 3/8 in (0.80 m)	10 3/8 in (0.26 m)	4.76 s	1.70 s	2.72 s	4.33 s	34.5 in (0.88 m)
All values from NFL Combine

Collins earned a Bachelor of Science in Health Policy and Administration from Penn State in 1991.
