= Cam Horsley =

American football player (born 2002)

No. 96 – Carolina Panthers
- Position: Defensive tackle
- Roster status: Practice squad

Personal information
- Born: February 6, 2002 (age 24)
- Listed height: 6 ft 3 in (1.91 m)
- Listed weight: 312 lb (142 kg)

Career information
- High school: Cinnaminson (Cinnaminson Township, New Jersey)
- College: Boston College (2020–2024)
- NFL draft: 2025: undrafted

Career history
- Tennessee Titans (2025–2026); Arizona Cardinals (2026)*; Carolina Panthers (2026–present)*
- * Offseason or practice squad member only

Career NFL statistics as of 2025
- Games played: 1
- Stats at Pro Football Reference

Cam Horsley (born February 6, 2002) is an American professional football defensive tackle for the Carolina Panthers of the National Football League (NFL). He played college football for the Boston College Eagles.

== Early life ==
Horsley is from Cinnaminson Township, New Jersey. He grew up playing baseball before trying out football as a freshman at Cinnaminson High School, becoming a top defensive lineman. He was an all-county and All-West Jersey League selection in high school. A three-star recruit and ranked the 37th-best player in the state by 247Sports, he committed to play college football for the Boston College Eagles.

== College career ==
Horlsey saw immediate playing time as a true freshman in 2020 and posted 13 tackles and a half-sack. He then recorded 38 tackles, 1.5 tackles-for-loss (TFLs) and 1.5 sacks while starting 10 games in 2021. He had 30 tackles and 5.5 TFLs while starting all 12 games in 2022. In 2023, he was one of his team's top tacklers, posting 41 tackles and a half-sack. He started 11 games in 2024 and recorded 42 tackles and seven TFLs. He was named third-team All-Atlantic Coast Conference (ACC) for his performance and concluded his collegiate career with 59 games played, 164 tackles and 18.5 TFLs.

== Professional career ==
Pre-draft measurables
Height	Weight	Arm length	Hand span	Wingspan	40-yard dash	10-yard split	20-yard split	20-yard shuttle	Three-cone drill	Vertical jump	Broad jump	Bench press
6 ft 2 3/4 in (1.90 m)	312 lb (142 kg)	33 in (0.84 m)	9 1/2 in (0.24 m)	6 ft 9 in (2.06 m)	5.06 s	1.73 s	2.88 s	4.74 s	7.67 s	31.5 in (0.80 m)	9 ft 0 in (2.74 m)	26 reps
All values from NFL Combine/Pro Day

=== Tennessee Titans ===
After going unselected in the 2025 NFL draft, Horsley signed with the Tennessee Titans as an undrafted free agent. On August 26, 2025, he was waived by the Titans as part of final roster cuts and re-signed to the practice squad the next day. Horsley was signed to the active roster on December 20. Horsley made his NFL debut on January 4, 2026, against the Jacksonville Jaguars.

Horsley was waived by the Titans on August 2, 2026.

=== Arizona Cardinals ===
On August 3, 2026, Horsley was claimed off waivers by the Arizona Cardinals. Horsley was waived by Arizona as a part of final roster cuts on August 30; he was re-signed to the team's practice squad the following day. He was released on November 3.

=== Carolina Panthers ===
On November 11, 2026, Horsley signed with the Carolina Panthers practice squad.
