= George W. Lee (New Jersey politician) =

American politician (1931–2007)

Personal details
- Born: February 26, 1931 Pennsylvania
- Died: July 13, 2007 (aged 76) Cinnaminson Township, New Jersey

George W. Lee (February 26, 1931 – July 13, 2007) was an American Democratic Party politician, who served as Acting Secretary of State of New Jersey in 1977.

== Biography ==
He was born on February 26, 1931, in Pennsylvania.

Lee, who had also served as Burlington County, New Jersey Democratic chairman, pleaded guilty to breaking election laws during Governor of New Jersey Brendan Byrne's 1977 re-election campaign. Lee, a resident of Cinnaminson Township, had been charged with one count each of laundering contributions to Mr. Byrne's re-election bid and collecting $7,500 in unreported contributions.

The plea was announced by James R. Zazzali, the New Jersey Attorney General and was entered in New Jersey Superior Court on the first scheduled day of Lee's. The trial was before Judge C. Judson Hamlin and it was heard on March 18, 1980, as a state grand jury indictment.

Edwin H. Stier, director of the Division of Criminal Justice, said the investigation was continuing into contributions to the campaign.

He died on July 13, 2007, in Cinnaminson Township, New Jersey.
