= Scootie Randall =

American basketball player (born 1990)

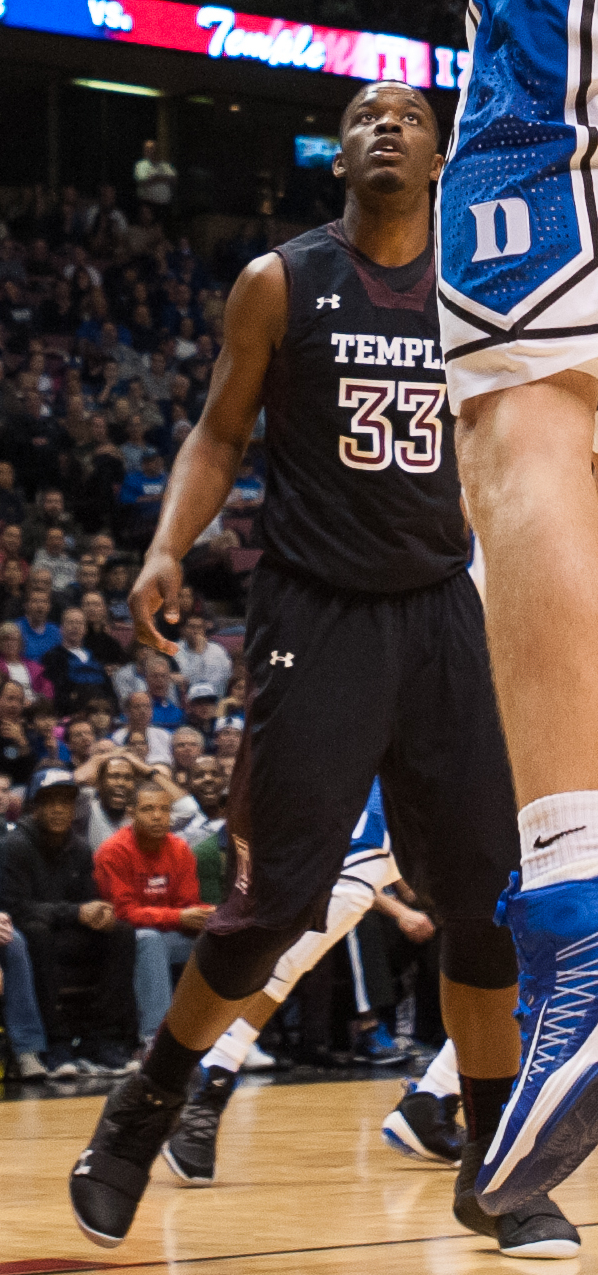
- Randall playing for Temple

No. 5 – Rizing Zephyr Fukuoka
- Position: Power forward
- League: B.League

Personal information
- Born: January 5, 1990 (age 36) Philadelphia, Pennsylvania, U.S.
- Listed height: 6 ft 6 in (1.98 m)
- Listed weight: 247 lb (112 kg)

Career information
- High school: Communications Tech (Philadelphia, Pennsylvania)
- College: Temple (2008-2013)
- NBA draft: 2013: undrafted
- Playing career: 2013–present

Career history
- 2013: Ryukyu Golden Kings
- 2013–2015: Iwate Big Bulls
- 2015–2016: Shimane Susanoo Magic
- 2017: Cyberdyne Ibaraki Robots
- 2017: Gunma Crane Thunders
- 2018–2019: Cyberdyne Ibaraki Robots
- 2020: Kagawa Five Arrows
- 2020: Osaka Evessa
- 2020–2021: Yamagata Wyverns
- 2021–2023: Toyotsu Fighting Eagles Nagoya
- 2023–2024: Kagawa Five Arrows
- 2024–present: Rizing Zephyr Fukuoka

Career highlights
- bj League Best Five (2015)

Andrew "Scootie" Randall (born January 5, 1990) is an American professional basketball player for Rizing Zephyr Fukuoka in Japan. He played college basketball for Temple. As a junior, he averaged 10.7 points and 4.7 rebounds per game but missed seven games with a hairline fracture. In his senior season in 2012-13, Randall averaged 11.3 points, 6.3 rebounds and 2.1 assists per game. After graduation, he moved to Japan and joined the Iwate Big Bulls. In 2015, he averaged 20.2 points per game and made the All-Star Team. The following year, Randall played for Shimane Susanoo Magic, averaging 23.5 points, 8.9 rebounds and 2 assists per game. He was named All-Japanese BJ League Forward of the Year.

== Career statistics ==
Legend
GP	Games played	GS	Games started	MPG	Minutes per game
FG%	Field goal percentage	3P%	3-point field goal percentage	FT%	Free throw percentage
RPG	Rebounds per game	APG	Assists per game	SPG	Steals per game
BPG	Blocks per game	PPG	Points per game	**Bold**	Career high

Year	Team	GP	GS	MPG	FG%	3P%	FT%	RPG	APG	SPG	BPG	PPG
2013-14	Ryukyu	10	0	25.0	.416	.333	.851	6.5	2.6	0.9	0.2	16.3
2013-14	Iwate	44	5	23.0	.452	.343	.721	5.5	2.1	0.8	0.2	14.9
2014-15	Iwate	52	52	30.6	.487	.245	.776	7.4	2.5	1.3	0.2	19.7
2015-16	Shimane	51	15	28.6	44.2	29.6	77.7	8.7	2.1	1.4	0.3	23.7
2016-17	Ibaraki	31	11	28.5	46.2	29.6	81.5	9.0	2.9	1.1	0.4	21.0
2017-18	Gunma	38	15	21.9	45.8	33.7	74.4	6.9	3.6	1.0	0.5	14.9
