= Matt Gono =

American football player (born 1996)

No. 73
- Position: Offensive tackle

Personal information
- Born: May 10, 1996 (age 30); Liberia
- Listed height: 6 ft 4 in (1.93 m)
- Listed weight: 305 lb (138 kg)

Career information
- High school: Cinnaminson (NJ)
- College: Wesley
- NFL draft: 2018: undrafted

Career history
- Atlanta Falcons (2018–2021); New York Giants (2022)*
- * Offseason or practice squad member only

Career NFL statistics
- Games played: 21
- Games started: 4
- Stats at Pro Football Reference

Matthew Gono (born May 10, 1996) is a former American football offensive tackle. He played college football at Wesley College. He went undrafted and signed with the Atlanta Falcons.

== Professional career ==
=== Atlanta Falcons ===
Gono signed with the Atlanta Falcons as an undrafted free agent on May 1, 2018. He made the Falcons initial 53-man roster but did not play in a regular season game and was inactive for all but the Falcons' final game of the season.

The Falcons placed a second-round restricted free agent tender on Gono on March 17, 2021. He signed the one-year contract on March 25.

Gono was placed on the reserve/physically unable to perform list to start the 2021 season after undergoing surgery in the offseason.

On January 28, 2022, Gono was released by the Falcons.

=== New York Giants ===
On March 9, 2022, Gono signed a one-year contract with the New York Giants. On August 3, 2022, Gono was placed on left squad/exempt list. Two days later, on August 5, it was revealed that Gono's neck condition could end his career playing football. His contract was terminated by the New York Giants on August 8, 2022.
