= Miriam Miller =

American dancer

- Citizenship: American
- Education: Fordham University
- Occupation: Ballet dancer
- Years active: 2015–present
- Organization: New York City Ballet
- Awards: Princess Grace Award

Miriam Miller is an American New York City Ballet dancer. She became a principal dancer at the organization in 2025.

== Career ==
Miller joined the New York City Ballet as an apprentice in 2015, shortly before graduating high school. There she played Titania from A Midsummer Nigh's Dream and the Lilac Fairy of Sleeping Beauty. She won a Princess Grace Award in 2017.

She became a principal dancer in 2025. In February, she played Odette and Odile in Swan Lake.

== Personal life ==
Miller is married and lives in Westchester County, New York. She graduated Fordham University with a major in anthropology.
