= Communications Technology High School =

School in Philadelphia, Pennsylvania, U.S.

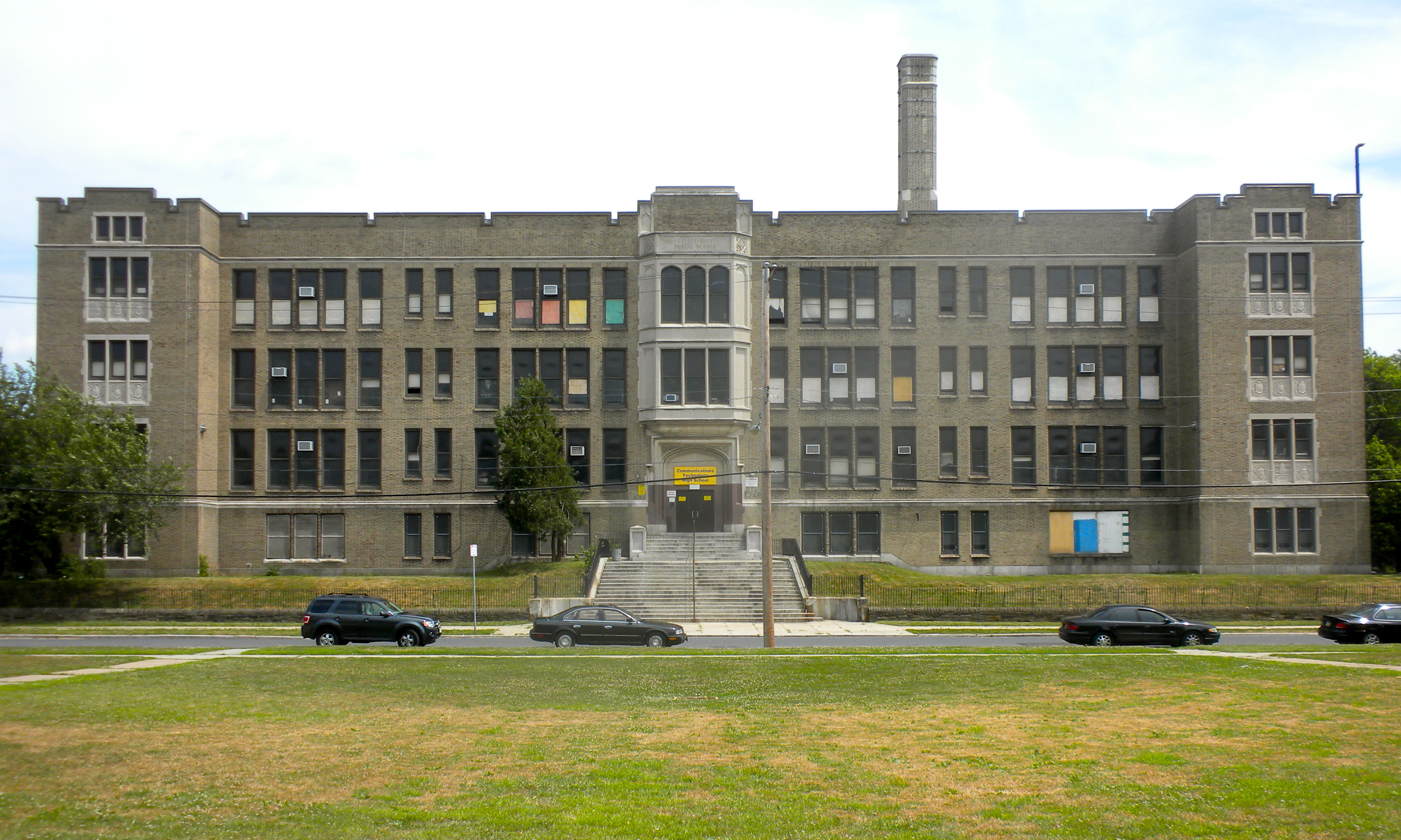
- George Wolf School, June 2010

Location
- 8110 Lyons Avenue, Philadelphia, Pennsylvania, 19153, United States; 39°53′55″N 75°14′46″W

Information
- Type: Comprehensive
- Established: 1988
- Closed: 2013
- School district: The School District of Philadelphia
- Principal: Colette Langston (final)
- Grades: 9–12
- Colors: Sky Blue and Gold Yellow
- Website: Website
- George Wolf School
- U.S. National Register of Historic Places
- Location within Philadelphia Location within Pennsylvania Location within the United States
- Area: 2.2 acres (0.89 ha)
- Built: 1926–1927
- Architect: Catharine, Irwin T.
- Architectural style: Late Gothic Revival
- MPS: Philadelphia Public Schools TR
- NRHP reference No.: 88002243
- Added to NRHP: November 18, 1988

Communications Technology High School was a public high school serving grades 9–12 located at 8110 Lyons Avenue in the Hedgerow neighborhood of Philadelphia, Pennsylvania. The school, which was located next to George Pepper Middle School, was part of the School District of Philadelphia's Comprehensive High School Region; in its later years, it operated as a campus of John Bartram High School, which is still in operation. In 2013, amid the rapid growth of publicly-funded charter schools in Philadelphia, the City shut down Communications Technology High School, along with 22 other district-run schools, to cut costs and consolidate the district's remaining students on fewer campuses. Students enrolled at Communications Technology at the time were automatically re-enrolled at the main campus of John Bartram High School.

== History ==
Communications Technology High School was originally known as the George Wolf School, named for the 19th century Pennsylvania governor nicknamed the "father" of the state's public schools. Construction began on the school building, designed by noted Philadelphia schools architect Irwin T. Catharine, in 1926, and the project was completed the following year. The building's three yellow brick stories, which are arranged in nine bays with projecting end bays and a raised basement, are built in the Late Gothic Revival-style; the design features an arched main center entrance surrounded by stone, a two-story projecting stone bay window, and a crenellated parapet. The school opened to students on November 18, 1927. Its building was added to the National Register of Historic Places in 1988.

The school's name was later changed to Communications Academy, as the school was made a part of John Bartram High School. In 2005, the name was changed again to Communications Technology High School. As of 2018, the City of Philadelphia planned to convert the former high school to a community center, while the adjacent Pepper Middle School building was slated for demolition.

== School uniforms ==
Communications Technology High School students were required to wear school uniforms, which consisted of either light blue golf shirts with the school's yellow patch name on the right side of the chest with navy blue or black khaki bottoms and skirts.

== Transportation ==
SEPTA's Route 36 Trolley and Routes 37, 108, and 400-series busses served the area near the school during its operation.

== Notable alumni ==
- Scootie Randall (2008), basketball player who plays in Japan
