= Tony DiLeo =

American basketball executive and former coach

Personal information
- Born: August 8, 1955 (age 71) Cinnaminson Township, New Jersey, U.S.
- Listed height: 6 ft 2 in (1.88 m)

Career information
- High school: Cinnaminson (Cinnaminson Township, New Jersey)
- College: Tennessee Tech (1973–1975); La Salle (1976–1978)
- NBA draft: 1978: undrafted
- Position: Guard
- Coaching career: 1979–2009

Career history

Coaching
- 1979–1986: DJK Agon 08 Düsseldorf (women HC)
- 1981–1985: Germany (women HC)
- 1986–1990: BSC Saturn Köln
- 1992–1994: Philadelphia 76ers (assistant)
- 2008–2009: Philadelphia 76ers (interim HC)

Tony DiLeo (born August 8, 1955) is an American former basketball executive and former coach. He served as the 21st head coach of the Philadelphia 76ers of the NBA, taking over the position mid-season on December 13, 2008, after then-head coach Maurice Cheeks was fired after starting the season with a 9–14 record. The team went 32–27 under DiLeo's leadership (finishing the season 41–41 overall), and lost their Eastern Conference quarterfinals series to the Orlando Magic. At the end of the season, DiLeo withdrew his name from consideration to return as head coach, opting instead to return to the Sixers' front office as senior vice president and assistant general manager. He was promoted to general manager in 2012, but was subsequently removed at the end of the season.

== High school ==
DiLeo was a basketball star at Cinnaminson High School in Cinnaminson Township, New Jersey.

== Collegiate career ==
DiLeo played basketball at Tennessee Tech and La Salle University, where, as a junior, he was named first-team Academic All-American and went on to graduate maxima cum laude from the La Salle School of Business.

== Professional career ==
=== International basketball ===
DiLeo was involved international basketball as both a player and a coach. He won nine national titles in the former West Germany's top divisions, seven in the women's (with DJK Agon 08 Düsseldorf) and two in the men's competition (with BSC Saturn Köln), and earned Coach of the Year honors in 1987. He also held the role of West German federation Women's National Coach from 1981 to 1985. While in Europe, he wrote and published the European Basketball Handbook, a guide designed to acclimate American players overseas.

=== Philadelphia 76ers ===
DiLeo has been a part of the 76ers basketball operations department since the 1990–91 season. After spending years within the organization in positions including director of scouting and assistant coach, DiLeo notably held the positions of Director of Player Personnel from 1999 to 2003 and was promoted to Senior vice president/assistant general manager in September 2003.

After the 76ers fired Maurice Cheeks on December 13, 2008, DiLeo was named interim head coach. Taking over the Sixers who had started the season with a 9–14 record, DiLeo managed to finish the 2008–09 season with a 41–41 record. This record was good enough to clinch the Sixers the sixth seed in the Eastern Conference for the playoffs and a matchup with the third seeded Southeast Division champion Orlando Magic. After taking game one of the series, the team lost four of five, including an ugly series-clinching loss in game six. On May 12, it was reported that DiLeo had asked team president and general manager Ed Stefanski to remove his name from consideration to return as head coach. DiLeo opted instead to return to the Sixers' front office as senior vice president and assistant general manager.

In 2012, DiLeo became the 76ers' general manager.

== Head coaching record ==
Legend
Regular season	G	Games coached	W	Games won	L	Games lost	W–L %	Win–loss %
Playoffs	PG	Playoff games	PW	Playoff wins	PL	Playoff losses	PW–L %	Playoff win–loss %

Team	Year	G	W	L	W–L%	Finish	PG	PW	PL	PW–L%	Result
Philadelphia	2008–09	59	32	27	.542	2nd in Atlantic	6	2	4	.333	Lost in First Round
Career		59	32	27	.542		6	2	4	.333	

== Personal life ==
DiLeo is married to Anna DiLeo, a former German professional basketball player, originally from Romania. They have two sons who both play basketball: – T. J., played college basketball at Temple University, and had a professional career overseas, while his younger brother Max, played at Monmouth University and is currently playing professionally in Europe. His nephew David is also a professional basketball player. The family lives in South Jersey.
