= Cinnaminson High School =

Public secondary school in Burlington County, New Jersey, United States

Location
- 1197 Riverton Road; Cinnaminson Township, Burlington County, New Jersey 08077; United States; 40.00369°N 74.997885°W

Information
- Type: Public high school
- Established: 1961
- School district: Cinnaminson Township Public Schools
- NCES School ID: 340312001020
- Principal: Ryan Gorman
- Faculty: 70.0 FTEs
- Grades: 9–12
- Enrollment: 929 (as of 2024–25)
- Student to teacher ratio: 13.3:1
- Colors: Red and Black
- Athletics conference: Burlington County Scholastic League (general); West Jersey Football League (football)
- Team name: Pirates
- Rival: Delran Bears
- Accreditation: Middle States Association of Colleges and Schools
- Website: chs.cinnaminson.com

Cinnaminson High School is a four-year public high school that serves students in ninth through twelfth grades from Cinnaminson Township in Burlington County, in the U.S. state of New Jersey, operating as the lone secondary school of the Cinnaminson Township Public Schools. The campus covers approximately 26 acres (110,000 m^{2}). The school has been accredited by the Middle States Association of Colleges and Schools Commission on Elementary and Secondary Schools.

As of the 2024–25 school year, the school had an enrollment of 929 students and 70.0 classroom teachers (on an FTE basis), for a student–teacher ratio of 13.3:1. There were 184 students (19.8% of enrollment) eligible for free lunch and 36 (3.9% of students) eligible for reduced-cost lunch.

== History ==
Students from the township had attended Palmyra High School before Cinnaminson High School was established in 1961.

== Awards, recognition and rankings ==
The school was the 99th-ranked public high school in New Jersey out of 339 schools statewide in New Jersey Monthly magazine's September 2014 cover story on the state's "Top Public High Schools", using a new ranking methodology. The school had been ranked 114th in the state of 328 schools in 2012, after being ranked 164th in 2010 out of 322 schools listed. The magazine ranked the school 161st in 2008 out of 316 schools. The school was ranked 137th in the magazine's September 2006 issue, which surveyed 316 schools across the state.

Schooldigger.com ranked the school tied for 163rd out of 381 public high schools statewide in its 2011 rankings (a decrease of 35 positions from the 2010 ranking) which were based on the combined percentage of students classified as proficient or above proficient on the mathematics (79.0%) and language arts literacy (96.0%) components of the High School Proficiency Assessment (HSPA).

== Extracurricular activities ==
The school's television production program, under the direction of Sean Wilson, received press coverage in 2015 after Taylor Swift tweeted about a lip sync video they made to her song "Shake It Off", the second schoolwide lip dub that the program has produced. The television production class has also done exceptionally well at the Ten Day Film Challenge, having qualified for the national competition twice.

== Athletics ==
The Cinnaminson High School Pirates compete in the Patriot Division of the Burlington County Scholastic League (BCSL), which is comprised of public and private high schools covering Burlington, Mercer and Ocean counties in Central Jersey, and operates under the supervision of the New Jersey State Interscholastic Athletic Association (NJSIAA). With 634 students in grades 10-12, the school was classified by the NJSIAA for the 2022–24 school years as Group II South for most athletic competition purposes. The football team competes in the Freedom Division of the 94-team West Jersey Football League superconference and was classified by the NJSIAA as Group III South for football for 2024–2026, which included schools with 695 to 882 students.

The first championship won by any of the school's athletic teams was in 1969 when the cross country team culminated a 12-1 meet record with a win at the Burlington County Scholastic League Cross Country Championship at Moorestown Memorial Field, with CHS runners placed 2nd, 3rd, 8th, 15th, and 18th to post the low score for the event. Head Coach Gene Campbell was later inducted into the CHS Athletics and the NJ State Coaches Association Hall of Fame. The team won the Group II state championship in 1989.

The boys' basketball team captured the Group III state title in 1982, defeating Linden High School in the tournament final.

Under head coach Gene Campbell, the girls soccer team won the Group II state title in 1989 (as co-champion with Glen Rock High School) and 1990 (vs. Mahwah High School). In 1991, they repeated as state champions under new head coach Gloria Eleuteri (vs. West Morris Mendham High School). The 1990 team finished the season with a 20–2 record after winning the Group II title by defeating Mahwah with a 1–0 victory in the playoff finals. A 1–0 win against West Morris Mendham in the championship game gave the team their third consecutive title and a 22–2–1 record for the season. In 2002, the team won the South, Group II title over Woodstown High School, by a 2–0 score.

The boys spring track team won the state championship in Group II in 1990.

In 1991, Cinnaminson and Harrison High School were declared boys' soccer co-champions after playing to a 0–0 tie in the state Group II final, the program's first state championship. The soccer team won the 1999 South, Group II Group Semifinals, defeating Northern Burlington County Regional High School by a score of 4–2 in the tournament final. The 2004 team won the South, Group II championship, edging Haddon Township High School in the final, 1–0. In 2007, the team won the South Jersey Group II state sectional championship with a 4–1 win over Delran High School in the tournament final.

The girls cross country team won the Group II state championship in 1991.

The football team won the NJSIAA South Jersey Group II state sectional title in 1991. The 1991 team posted the program's first perfect season by going 11–0 and defeating Hammonton High School in the South Jersey Group II sectional championship game. In 2004, Cinnaminson running back and team co-captain Darrell "DJ" Riley set a single-game varsity football rushing record with 360 yards in only three quarters of play. He also had six touchdowns in his record performance. The coach of the school's football team is Mario Patrizi. In football, Cinnaminson has notable alumni: Andre Collins, a linebacker for the Cincinnati Bengals, headed the first class of inductees to the Cinnaminson High School Athletic Hall of Fame. Collins, a 1986 graduate, went on to compete in football at Penn State, and before playing for the Bengals was a member of the 1991 Washington Redskins' Super Bowl team.

The baseball team won the Group II state championship in 2013, defeating Mahwah High School by a 2–1 score in the finals of the tournament. In 2013, the team defeated West Deptford High School by a score of 8–1 to win the South Jersey Group II state title under head coach, Kevin Merrill.

The wrestling team won the Central Jersey Group I sectional title in 2015.

Cinnaminson High School competes in Varsity Tier II of the South Jersey High School Ice Hockey League.

== Administration ==
The school's principal is Ryan Gorman. His core administration team includes two assistant principals.

== Notable alumni ==
- Topper Clemons (born 1963), former professional football running back who played in the NFL for the Philadelphia Eagles
- Andre Collins (born 1968, class of 1986), Director of Retired Players with the National Football League Players' Association, All-American football star at Penn State, and 10-year NFL linebacker, former resident
- Gerry Collins (born 1969), former professional football running back who played in the Canadian Football League (CFL) with the Ottawa Rough Riders and Edmonton Eskimos
- Max DiLeo (born 1993), professional basketball player for Baskets Oldenburg of the German Basketball Bundesliga
- T. J. DiLeo (born 1990), professional basketball player; son of Tony
- Tony DiLeo (born 1955), former interim head coach of the Philadelphia 76ers; father of Max and T. J.
- Matt Gono (born 1996, class of 2014), offensive tackle who played in the NFL for the Atlanta Falcons
- Darrell Hazell (born 1964), former head coach of the Kent State Golden Flashes football and Purdue Boilermakers football teams
- Cam Horsley (born 2002), professional football defensive tackle for the Arizona Cardinals
- David K. Israel (born 1967/68), composer, essayist, author, screenwriter and producer
- Kristin Phillips-Hill (born 1965, class of 1984), member of the Pennsylvania State Senate representing the 28th Senate district
- Jason Zimmerman (born 1989, class of 2007), professional Super Smash Bros. player
