= T. J. DiLeo =

American-German basketball player

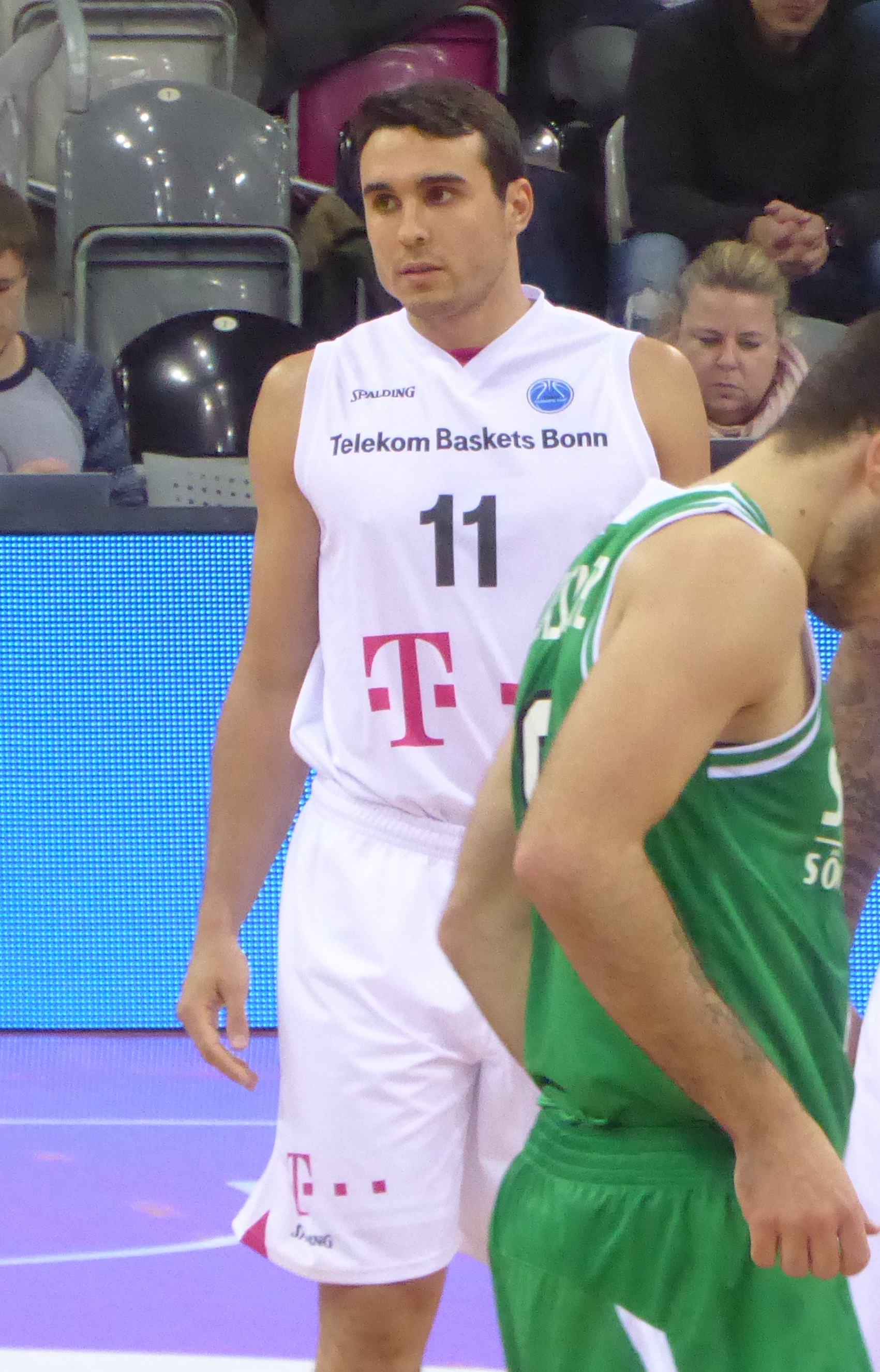
- DiLeo with Bonn in 2016.

Philadelphia 76ers
- Title: Player development coach
- League: NBA

Personal information
- Born: June 22, 1990 (age 36)
- Listed height: 6 ft 3 in (1.91 m)
- Listed weight: 209 lb (95 kg)

Career information
- High school: Cinnaminson (Cinnaminson Township, New Jersey)
- College: Temple (2008–2013)
- NBA draft: 2013: undrafted
- Playing career: 2013–2021
- Position: Shooting guard

Career history
- 2013–2016: Gießen 46ers
- 2016–2021: Telekom Baskets Bonn

Career highlights
- 2× BBL All-Star (2018, 2019)

Anthony "T. J." DiLeo (born June 22, 1990) is a retired American-German professional basketball player who played professionally for the Giessen 46ers and the Telekom Baskets Bonn of the Basketball Bundesliga (BBL). He retired from playing in 2021 and joined the NBA's Philadelphia 76ers as a player development coach heading into the 2021–22 season.

== Playing career ==
DiLeo played five seasons for the Temple Owls, redshirting his freshman year after suffering a season-ending injury five games into the team's season. He played in 126 career games and four NCAA Tournaments for the Owls, averaging 2.3 points, 1.5 rebounds, and one assist per game.

After his redshirt freshman season DiLeo participated in the 2010 FIBA Europe Under-20 Championship as a member of the Germany U20 national team, averaging 10.7 points per game (second-best on the team) as Germany finished 14th overall.

=== Gießen 46ers ===
After completing his college career at Temple, DiLeo signed with the Gießen 46ers of the German ProA league in 2013. He played in 76 games for the 46ers over the course of three seasons as the team moved up to the top tier Basketball Bundesliga (BBL).

=== Telekom Baskets Bonn ===
DiLeo signed with Telekom Baskets Bonn in 2016. In 2017, he signed an extension to stay with the team until 2019 after averaging 5.1 points and 3.1 assists per game in EuroCup competition. DiLeo was selected as a reserve for the national team in the 2018 BBL All-Star Game. DiLeo was named a reserve for a second straight All-Star Game in 2019. DiLeo retired after the 2020–21 season.

== Coaching ==
DiLeo began his coaching career in 2021 as a player development coach for the NBA's Philadelphia 76ers.

== Personal life ==
DiLeo is the son of former NBA coach and executive Tony DiLeo, and former German professional basketball player Anna DiLeo. His younger brother, Max, played college basketball at Monmouth and is currently playing in Europe.
