= 2010–11 Kansas State Wildcats men's basketball team =

American college basketball season

2010–11 Kansas State Wildcats men's basketball

NCAA Tournament, Round of 32
- Conference: Big 12 Conference

Ranking
- Coaches: No. 24
- AP: No. 21
- Record: 23–11 (10–6 Big 12)
- Head coach: Frank Martin
- Assistant coaches: Matt Figger; Dalonte Hill; Brad Underwood
- Home arena: Bramlage Coliseum (12,500)

2010–11 Big 12 men's basketball standings
	Conf.				Overall
Team	W		L	PCT	W		L	PCT
No. 2 Kansas †	14	–	2	.875	35	–	3	.921
No. 8 Texas	13	–	3	.813	28	–	8	.778
No. 24 Texas A&M	10	–	6	.625	24	–	9	.727
No. 21 Kansas State	10	–	6	.625	23	–	11	.676
Colorado	8	–	8	.500	24	–	14	.632
Missouri	8	–	8	.500	23	–	11	.676
Baylor	7	–	9	.438	18	–	13	.581
Nebraska	7	–	9	.438	19	–	13	.594
Oklahoma State	6	–	10	.375	20	–	14	.588
Oklahoma	5	–	11	.313	14	–	18	.438
Texas Tech	5	–	11	.313	13	–	19	.406
Iowa State	3	–	13	.188	16	–	16	.500
† 2011 Big 12 Tournament winner Rankings from AP poll

The 2010–11 Kansas State Wildcats men's basketball team represented Kansas State University in the 2010-11 NCAA Division I men's basketball season. The head coach was Frank Martin, who was serving his 4th year at the helm of the Wildcats. The team played its home games in Bramlage Coliseum in Manhattan, Kansas. Kansas State is a member of the Big 12 Conference. The Wildcats began conference play with a trip to Stillwater, Oklahoma, facing the Oklahoma State Cowboys and finished conference play at home against Iowa State Cyclones. The team finished with a 10–6 record, placing 4th. They lost in Big 12 Tournament Quarterfinals to Colorado Buffaloes, 87–75, and participated in the 2011 NCAA Division I men's basketball tournament. In NCAA tournament, they beat Utah State, 73–68 in second round, and lost to Wisconsin, 70–65 in third round.

== Preseason ==
The team played their home games at the Bramlage Coliseum, which has a capacity of 12,528. They are in their 15th season as a member of the Big 12 Conference. Coming back from their 2009–10 season, they compiled a record of 28–8 and advanced to the Elite Eight of the 2010 NCAA Division I men's basketball tournament.

However, Kansas State lost star player Denis Clemente to graduation, whom Blue Ribbon Yearbook called their "emotional leader". Clemente was the team's second leading scorer at 16.6 points per game, and led the team in assists, dishing out 4.2 per game. Bench players Luis Colon and Chris Merriewether, a former walk-on, also graduated. In addition, starting forward Dominique Sutton, known for his defensive capabilities, transferred to North Carolina Central University to be closer to his family. In 2009–10, he averaged 7.2 points and 5.8 rebounds per game.

Despite the losses, the Wildcats were regarded as one of the best teams coming into the 2010–11 season. The preseason ESPN/USA Today Coaches Poll, released on October 21, had them as the #3 team in NCAA Division I.

=== Recruiting ===
The following is a list of the recruits for the 2010–2011 season.

College recruiting information
Name	Hometown	School	Height	Weight	Commit date
Freddy Asprilla; C	Miami, FL	Miami Dade Community College	6 ft 10 in (2.08 m)	280 lb (130 kg)	Nov 23, 2009
Freddy Asprilla; C	Recruit ratings: Scout: Rivals: (93)				
Juevol Myles; PG	Tallahassee, FL	Tallahassee Community College	6 ft 1 in (1.85 m)	190 lb (86 kg)	Apr 23, 2010
Juevol Myles; PG	Recruit ratings: Scout: (40)				
Shane Southwell; SF	New York, NY	Rice	6 ft 6 in (1.98 m)	220 lb (100 kg)	Oct 5, 2009
Shane Southwell; SF	Recruit ratings: Scout: Rivals: (92)				
Will Spradling; PG	Overland Park, KS	Shawnee Mission South	6 ft 3 in (1.91 m)	170 lb (77 kg)	Nov 6, 2008
Will Spradling; PG	Recruit ratings: Scout: Rivals: (88)				
Nino Williams; SF	Leavenworth, KS	Leavenworth	6 ft 5 in (1.96 m)	180 lb (82 kg)	Oct 4, 2009
Nino Williams; SF	Recruit ratings: Scout: Rivals: (90)				
Overall recruit ranking:
Note: In many cases, Scout, Rivals, 247Sports, On3, and ESPN may conflict in their listings of height and weight.; In these cases, the average was taken. ESPN grades are on a 100-point scale.; Sources: "2010 Kansas State Basketball Commits". Rivals.; "2010 Kansas State Basketball Commits". Scout.; "2010 Kansas State Basketball Commits". ESPN.; "Scout.com Team Recruiting Rankings". Scout.; "2010 Team Ranking". Rivals.

== Schedule ==
Date time, TV	Rank^{#}	Opponent^{#}	Result	Record	Site (attendance) city, state
Exhibition
11/02/2010*; 7:00 pm, FSKC	No. 3	Newman	W 83–56	–	Bramlage Coliseum (12,528); Manhattan, KS
11/07/2010*; 2:30 pm, FSKC	No. 3	Washburn	W 90–44	–	Bramlage Coliseum (12,528); Manhattan, KS
Regular Season
11/12/2010*; 8:00 pm, ESPNU	No. 3	James Madison; CBE Classic	W 75–61	1–0	Bramlage Coliseum (12,528); Manhattan, KS
11/16/2010*; 3:00 pm, ESPN	No. 3	No. 22 Virginia Tech	W 73–57	2–0	Bramlage Coliseum (12,528); Manhattan, KS
11/18/2010*; 7:00 pm, FSKC	No. 3	Presbyterian; CBE Classic	W 76–67	3–0	Bramlage Coliseum (12,528); Manhattan, KS
11/22/2010*; 8:30 pm, ESPN2	No. 4	vs. No. 22 Gonzaga; CBE Classic	W 81–64	4–0	Sprint Center (18,630); Kansas City, MO
11/23/2010*; 9:00 pm, ESPN2	No. 4	vs. No. 1 Duke; CBE Classic	L 68–82	4–1	Sprint Center (18,696); Kansas City, MO
11/26/2010*; 7:00 pm, Cox	No. 4	Texas Southern	W 84–60	5–1	Bramlage Coliseum (12,528); Manhattan, KS
11/29/2010*; 7:00 pm, FSKC	No. 5	Emporia State	W 85–61	6–1	Bramlage Coliseum (12,528); Manhattan, KS
12/03/2010*; 10:00 pm, FSN	No. 5	at Washington State; Big 12/Pac-10 Hardwood Series	W 63–58	7–1	Beasley Coliseum (11,671); Pullman, WA
12/06/2010*; 7:00 pm, FSKC	No. 5	Alcorn State	W 89–55	8–1	Bramlage Coliseum (12,528); Manhattan, KS
12/11/2010*; 3:00 pm, FSKC	No. 5	at Loyola Chicago	W 68–60	9–1	Gentile Center (4,821); Chicago, IL
12/18/2010*; 2:30 pm, FSKC	No. 6	vs. Florida; Orange Bowl Basketball Classic	L 44–57	9–2	BankAtlantic Center (13,489); Sunrise, FL
12/21/2010*; 8:00 pm, ESPN2	No. 11	vs. UNLV; HyVee Wildcat Classic	L 59–63	9–3	Sprint Center (18,422); Kansas City, MO
12/23/2010*; 7:00 pm, FSKC	No. 11	UMKC	W 80–64	10–3	Bramlage Coliseum (11,565); Manhattan, KS
12/31/2010*; 1:00 pm, FSKC	No. 17	North Florida	W 100–76	11–3	Bramlage Coliseum (12,528); Manhattan, KS
01/03/2011*; 7:00 pm, FSKC	No. 17	Savannah State	W 92–61	12–3	Bramlage Coliseum (11,973); Manhattan, KS
01/08/2011; 12:00 pm, ESPN2	No. 17	at Oklahoma State	L 62–76	12–4 (0–1)	Gallagher-Iba Arena (11,330); Stillwater, OK
01/12/2011; 8:00 pm, ESPNU	No. 21	Colorado	L 66–74	12–5 (0–2)	Bramlage Coliseum (12,377); Manhattan, KS
01/15/2011; 3:00 pm, ESPNU	No. 21	Texas Tech	W 94–60	13–5 (1–2)	Bramlage Coliseum (12,528); Manhattan, KS
01/17/2011; 4:30 pm, ESPN		at No. 13 Missouri	L 59–75	13–6 (1–3)	Mizzou Arena (15,061); Columbia, MO
01/22/2011; 1:00 pm, ESPN		at No. 11 Texas A&M	L 56–64	13–7 (1–4)	Reed Arena (11,616); College Station, TX
01/24/2011; 8:00 pm, ESPN		Baylor	W 69–61	14–7 (2–4)	Bramlage Coliseum (12,528); Manhattan, KS
01/29/2011; 6:00 pm, ESPN		No. 6 Kansas; Sunflower Showdown, ESPN College GameDay	L 66–90	14–8 (2–5)	Allen Fieldhouse (16,300); Lawrence, KS
02/02/2011; 7:00 pm, Big 12 Network		Nebraska	W 69–53	15–8 (3–5)	Bramlage Coliseum (12,528); Manhattan, KS
02/05/2011; 12:30 pm, Big 12 Network		at Iowa State	W 86–85	16–8 (4–5)	Hilton Coliseum (12,411); Ames, IA
02/12/2011; 8:00 pm, ESPNU		at Colorado	L 56–58	16–9 (4–6)	Coors Events Center (11,052); Boulder, CO
02/14/2011; 8:00 pm, ESPN		No. 1 Kansas; Sunflower Showdown	W 84–68	17–9 (5–6)	Bramlage Coliseum (12,528); Manhattan, KS
02/19/2011; 3:00 pm, Big 12 Network		Oklahoma	W 77–62	18–9 (6–6)	Bramlage Coliseum (12,528); Manhattan, KS
02/23/2011; 8:00 pm, ESPNU		at Nebraska	W 61–57	19–9 (7–6)	Bob Devaney Sports Center (12,178); Lincoln, NE
02/26/2011; 11:00 pm, ESPN2		No. 20 Missouri	W 80–70	20–9 (8–6)	Bramlage Coliseum (12,528); Manhattan, KS
02/28/2011; 8:00 pm, ESPN		at No. 7 Texas	W 75–70	21–9 (9–6)	Frank Erwin Center (16,734); Austin, TX
03/05/2011; 12:30 pm, Big 12 Network		Iowa State	W 67–55	22–9 (10–6)	Bramlage Coliseum (12,528); Manhattan, KS
2011 Big 12 men's basketball tournament
03/10/2011; 2:00 pm, Big 12 Network	(4) No. 19	vs. (5) Colorado; Quarterfinals	L 75–87	22–10	Sprint Center (18,910); Kansas City, MO
2011 NCAA Division I men's basketball tournament
03/17/2011*; 8:57 pm, truTV	(5 SE) No. 21	vs. (12 SE) No. 19 Utah State; Second Round	W 73–68	23–10	McKale Center (10,295); Tucson, AZ
03/19/2011*; 7:40 pm, TNT	(5 SE) No. 21	vs. (4 SE) No. 16 Wisconsin; Third Round	L 65–70	23–11	McKale Center (10,377); Tucson, AZ
*Non-conference game. ^{#}Rankings from AP Poll. (#) Tournament seedings in parentheses. SE=NCAA Southeast Regional. All times are in Central Time.

== Rankings ==
Poll	Pre	Wk 1	Wk 2	Wk 3	Wk 4	Wk 5	Wk 6	Wk 7	Wk 8	Wk 9	Wk 10	Wk 11	Wk 12	Wk 13	Wk 14	Wk 15	Wk 16	Wk 17	Wk 18	Final
AP	3	3	4	5	5	6	11	17	17	21								19	21	
Coaches	3	3	4	5	5	6	11	17	17	20	24							23	24	24

== Roster ==
2010–11 Kansas State Wildcats men's basketball team
Players
Coaches

Pos.	#	Name	Height	Weight	Year	Hometown
G	0	Jacob Pullen	6 ft 0 in (1.83 m)	200 lb (91 kg)	Sr	Maywood, IL
G	1	Shane Southwell	6 ft 6 in (1.98 m)	220 lb (100 kg)	Fr	Harlem, NY
G	2	Devon Peterson	6 ft 3 in (1.91 m)	190 lb (86 kg)	Jr	Brooklyn, NY
G	3	Martavious Irving	6 ft 1 in (1.85 m)	209 lb (95 kg)	So	Fort Lauderdale, Fl
G	4	Juevol Myles	6 ft 1 in (1.85 m)	190 lb (86 kg)	So	Ajax, ONT
F	10	Victor Ojeleye	6 ft 6 in (1.98 m)	225 lb (102 kg)	Jr	Ottawa, KS
F	11	Nino Williams	6 ft 6 in (1.98 m)	226 lb (103 kg)	Fr	St. Louis, MO
F	12	Nick Russell	6 ft 4 in (1.93 m)	200 lb (91 kg)	So	Duncanville, TX
F	21	Jordan Henriquez	7 ft 0 in (2.13 m)	245 lb (111 kg)	So	Port Chester, NY
G	22	Rodney McGruder	6 ft 4 in (1.93 m)	205 lb (93 kg)	So	Washington, D.C.
F	24	Curtis Kelly	6 ft 8 in (2.03 m)	250 lb (113 kg)	Sr	New York, NY
F	31	Alex Potuzak	6 ft 9 in (2.06 m)	190 lb (86 kg)	Fr	Clyde, KS
F	32	Jamar Samuels	6 ft 7 in (2.01 m)	220 lb (100 kg)	Jr	Washington, D.C.
G	55	Will Spradling	6 ft 3 in (1.91 m)	170 lb (77 kg)	Fr	Overland Park, KS

Head coach

- Frank Martin (FIU)

Assistant coach(es)

- Dalonte Hill (Charlotte)
- Brad Underwood (Kansas State)
- Matt Figger (Eastern Kentucky)

Legend

- (C) Team captain
- (S) Suspended
- (I) Ineligible
- (W) Walk-on
- Injured
- Current redshirt

Roster
Last update: 2011-02-03

During the season, junior Freddy Asprilla and sophomore Wally Judge left the team and do not appear on the roster.

== See also ==
- 2011 NCAA Division I men's basketball tournament
- 2011 Big 12 men's basketball tournament
- 2010-11 NCAA Division I men's basketball season
- 2010-11 NCAA Division I men's basketball rankings
- List of NCAA Division I institutions
