= 2010–11 Missouri Tigers men's basketball team =

American college basketball season

2010–11 Missouri Tigers men's basketball

Cancun Challenge Champions

NCAA tournament, Round of 64
- Conference: Big 12
- North
- Record: 23–11 (8–8 Big 12)
- Head coach: Mike Anderson
- Assistant coaches: Melvin Watkins; Matt Zimmerman; T.J. Cleveland
- Home arena: Mizzou Arena

2010–11 Big 12 men's basketball standings
	Conf.				Overall
Team	W		L	PCT	W		L	PCT
No. 2 Kansas †	14	–	2	.875	35	–	3	.921
No. 8 Texas	13	–	3	.813	28	–	8	.778
No. 24 Texas A&M	10	–	6	.625	24	–	9	.727
No. 21 Kansas State	10	–	6	.625	23	–	11	.676
Colorado	8	–	8	.500	24	–	14	.632
Missouri	8	–	8	.500	23	–	11	.676
Baylor	7	–	9	.438	18	–	13	.581
Nebraska	7	–	9	.438	19	–	13	.594
Oklahoma State	6	–	10	.375	20	–	14	.588
Oklahoma	5	–	11	.313	14	–	18	.438
Texas Tech	5	–	11	.313	13	–	19	.406
Iowa State	3	–	13	.188	16	–	16	.500
† 2011 Big 12 Tournament winner Rankings from AP poll

The 2010–11 Missouri Tigers men's basketball team represented the University of Missouri in the 2010–11 NCAA Division I men's basketball season. Their head coach was Mike Anderson, who was in his 5th year at Missouri. The team played its home games at Mizzou Arena in Columbia, Missouri and were members of the Big 12 Conference. They finished the season 23–11, 8–8 in Big 12 play and lost in the quarterfinals of the 2011 Big 12 men's basketball tournament to Texas A&M. They received an at-large bid to the 2011 NCAA Division I men's basketball tournament, where they lost in the second round to Cincinnati.

In March, rumors began to swirl that Anderson would pursue a job after the season at the University of Arkansas, where he spent 17 years as an assistant coach to Nolan Richardson. Anderson quickly dismissed the talk, telling Columbia Tribune beat writer Steve Walentik that he planned to coach at Missouri "for a long time, retire here." However, later in the month, Anderson accepted a job at Arkansas. Missouri subsequently hired Frank Haith, who finished 43–69 in ACC play as the head coach at Miami from 2004 to 2011.

== Roster ==
Name	#	Position	Height	Weight	Year	Home town
Phil Pressey	1	Guard	5-10	168	FR	Dallas, Texas
Ricky Kreklow	2	Guard	6-6	195	FR	Columbia, Missouri
Matt Pressey	3	Guard	6-2	185	JR	Dallas, Texas
Ricardo Ratliffe	10	Forward	6-8	240	JR	Hampton, Virginia
Michael Dixon Jr.	11	Guard	6-1	180	SO	Kansas City, Missouri
Marcus Denmon	12	Guard	6-3	185	JR	Kansas City, Missouri
Kadeem Green	15	Forward	6-8	200	FR	Toronto, Ontario, Canada
Laurence Bowers	21	Forward	6-8	210	JR	Memphis, Tennessee
Justin Stafford	23	Forward	6-9	230	SR	Bloomington, Illinois
Kim English	24	Guard	6-6	200	JR	Baltimore, Maryland
Jarrett Sutton	25	Guard	6-4	190	SR	Kansas City, Missouri
Steve Moore	32	Center	6-9	270	JR	Kansas City, Missouri

== Schedule ==
Date time, TV	Rank^{#}	Opponent^{#}	Result	Record	Site (attendance) city, state
Preseason
11/05/2010*; 7:00 pm, MSN	No. 15	Harris–Stowe State	W 114–60	—	Mizzou Arena (7,926); Columbia, MO
11/12/2010*; 7:00 pm, MSN	No. 15	Arkansas–Fort Smith	W 115–74	—	Mizzou Arena (8,425); Columbia, MO
Non-conference regular season
11/18/2010*; 7:00 pm, MSN	No. 15	Western Illinois; Cancun Challenge	W 66–61	1–0	Mizzou Arena (8,558); Columbia, MO
11/20/2010*; 3:00 pm, MSN	No. 15	North Florida; Cancun Challenge	W 96–58	2–0	Mizzou Arena (7,134); Columbia, MO
11/23/2010*; 6:00 pm, CBSCS	No. 11	vs. Wyoming; Cancun Challenge semifinals	W 72–62	3–0	Aventura Spa Palace (330); Playa Del Carmen, Mexico
11/24/2010*; 8:30 pm, CBSCS	No. 11	vs. La Salle; Cancun Challenge Championship	W 83–71	4–0	Aventura Spa Palace; Playa Del Carmen, Mexico
11/28/2010*; 3:00 pm, MSN	No. 11	Arkansas–Pine Bluff	W 91–63	5–0	Mizzou Arena (6,361); Columbia, MO
11/30/2010*; 8:00 pm, ESPNU	No. 9	vs. No. 16 Georgetown	L 102–111 ^{OT}	5–1	Sprint Center (14,647); Kansas City, MO
12/2/2010*; 10:00 pm, FSN	No. 9	at Oregon; Big 12/Pac-10 Hardwood Series	W 83–80	6–1	McArthur Court (6,843); Eugene, OR
12/08/2010*; 8:00 pm, ESPNU	No. 15	Vanderbilt	W 85–82 ^{OT}	7–1	Mizzou Arena (11,168); Columbia, MO
12/11/2010*; 4:00 pm, MSN	No. 15	Presbyterian	W 70–55	8–1	Mizzou Arena (8,618); Columbia, MO
12/16/2010*; 7:00 pm, MSN	No. 13	Oral Roberts	W 81–62	9–1	Mizzou Arena (8,130); Columbia, MO
12/18/2010*; 7:00 pm, MSN	No. 13	Central Arkansas	W 116–63	10–1	Mizzou Arena (7,924); Columbia, MO
12/22/2010*; 8:00 pm, ESPN2	No. 11	vs. No. 21 Illinois; Braggin' Rights	W 75–64	11–1	Scottrade Center (21,906); St. Louis, MO
12/27/2010*; 7:00 pm, MSN	No. 10	Northern Illinois	W 97–61	12–1	Mizzou Arena (10,776); Columbia, MO
12/30/2010*; 7:00 pm, MSN	No. 10	Old Dominion	W 81–58	13–1	Mizzou Arena (13,107); Columbia, MO
01/05/2011*; 7:00 pm, MSN	No. 9	North Alabama	W 98–58	14–1	Mizzou Arena (8,367); Columbia, MO
Big 12 regular season
01/08/2011; 12:30 pm, Big 12 Network	No. 9	at Colorado	L 76–89	14–2 (0–1)	Coors Events Center (8,694); Boulder, CO
01/12/2011; 8:00 pm, MSN	No. 15	Nebraska	W 77–69	15–2 (1–1)	Mizzou Arena (11,358); Columbia, MO
01/15/2011; 12:00 pm, ESPN 2	No. 15	at No. 14 Texas A&M	L 89–91 ^{OT}	15–3 (1–2)	Reed Arena (11,005); College Station, TX
01/17/2011; 4:30 pm, ESPN	No. 13	Kansas State; Gold Rush	W 75–59	16–3 (2–2)	Mizzou Arena (15,061); Columbia, MO
01/22/2011; 8:00 pm, ESPNU	No. 13	Iowa State	W 87–54	17–3 (3–2)	Mizzou Arena (15,061); Columbia, MO
01/29/2011; 8:00 pm, ESPNU	No. 11	at No. 7 Texas	L 58–71	17–4 (3–3)	Frank Erwin Center (16,734); Austin, TX
02/02/2011; 8:00 pm, ESPN2	No. 14	at Oklahoma State	L 70–76	17–5 (3–4)	Gallagher-Iba Arena (10,515); Stillwater, OK
02/05/2011; 6:30 pm, ESPN3	No. 14	Colorado	W 89–73	18–5 (4–4)	Mizzou Arena (14,288); Columbia, MO
02/07/2011; 8:00 pm, ESPN	No. 19	at No. 2 Kansas; Border War	L 86–103	18–6 (4–5)	Allen Fieldhouse (16,300); Lawrence, KS
02/12/2011; 12:30 pm, ESPN3	No. 19	Oklahoma	W 84–61	19–6 (5–5)	Mizzou Arena (14,265); Columbia, MO
02/15/2011; 6:00 pm, ESPN2	No. 20	Texas Tech	W 92–84	20–6 (6–5)	Mizzou Arena (10,488); Columbia, MO
02/19/2011; 12:45 pm, ESPN3	No. 20	at Iowa State	W 76–70	21–6 (7–5)	Hilton Coliseum (12,691); Ames, IA
02/23/2011; 8:00 pm, ESPN2	No. 20	Baylor	W 77–59	22–6 (8–5)	Mizzou Arena (14,297); Columbia, MO
02/26/2011; 11:00 am, ESPN	No. 20	at Kansas State	L 70–80	22–7 (8–6)	Bramlage Coliseum (12,528); Manhattan, KS
03/01/2011; 7:00 pm, Big 12 Network	No. 22	at Nebraska	L 58–69	22–8 (8–7)	Bob Devaney Sports Center (9,467); Lincoln, NE
03/05/2011; 11:00 am, CBS	No. 22	No. 2 Kansas	L 66–70	22–9 (8–8)	Mizzou Arena (15,061); Columbia, MO
Big 12 tournament
03/09/2011; 8:30 pm, Big 12 Network	(6)	vs. (11) Texas Tech; Big 12 First Round	W 88–84	23–9	Sprint Center (18,910); Kansas City, MO
03/10/2011; 8:30 pm, ESPN2	(6)	vs. (3) Texas A&M; Big 12 Quarterfinals	L 71–86	23–10	Sprint Center (18,910); Kansas City, MO
NCAA tournament
03/17/2011*; 8:50 pm, TNT	(11 W)	vs. (6 W) Cincinnati; NCAA Second Round	L 63–78	23–11	Verizon Center (17,706); Washington, DC
*Non-conference game. ^{#}Rankings from AP Poll. (#) Tournament seedings in parentheses. All times are in Central Time.
