= 2010–11 Texas A&M Aggies men's basketball team =

American college basketball season

2010–11 Texas A&M Aggies men's basketball

NCAA Tournament, Round of 64
- Conference: Big 12 Conference

Ranking
- AP: No. 24
- Record: 24–9 (10–6 Big 12)
- Head coach: Mark Turgeon
- Assistant coaches: Scott Spinelli; Pooh Williamson; Bill Walker
- Home arena: Reed Arena

2010–11 Big 12 men's basketball standings
	Conf.				Overall
Team	W		L	PCT	W		L	PCT
No. 2 Kansas †	14	–	2	.875	35	–	3	.921
No. 8 Texas	13	–	3	.813	28	–	8	.778
No. 24 Texas A&M	10	–	6	.625	24	–	9	.727
No. 21 Kansas State	10	–	6	.625	23	–	11	.676
Colorado	8	–	8	.500	24	–	14	.632
Missouri	8	–	8	.500	23	–	11	.676
Baylor	7	–	9	.438	18	–	13	.581
Nebraska	7	–	9	.438	19	–	13	.594
Oklahoma State	6	–	10	.375	20	–	14	.588
Oklahoma	5	–	11	.313	14	–	18	.438
Texas Tech	5	–	11	.313	13	–	19	.406
Iowa State	3	–	13	.188	16	–	16	.500
† 2011 Big 12 Tournament winner Rankings from AP poll

The 2010–11 Texas A&M Aggies men's basketball team represented Texas A&M University in the 2010-11 NCAA Division I men's basketball season. Mark Turgeon returned for his fourth year as coach of the Aggies after renegotiating his contract to stay in College Station. The team played its home games in Reed Arena and are members of the Big 12 Conference. They finished the season 24–9, 12–6 in Big 12 play and lost in the semifinals of the 2011 Big 12 men's basketball tournament to their rival Texas. They received an at-large berth in the 2011 NCAA Division I men's basketball tournament where they lost in the second round to Florida State.

== Previous season ==
The Aggies finished the previous year with a 24–10 record and a second-round appearance in the NCAA tournament–one of only two programs in the country to win a game in the tournament each of the previous five years.

== Preseason ==
=== Player departures ===
The Aggies will be without guard Donald Sloan and forward Bryan Davis, both of whom graduated as members of the winningest class in Texas A&M history, with 100 victories over four years. Guard Derrick Roland broke his tibia and fibula in a game on December 22, 2009, and missed the rest of the season. Although he used up his four years of NCAA athletic eligibility, he filed a medical redshirt appeal to get an extra year, but was denied.

=== Recruiting ===
College recruiting information
Name	Hometown	School	Height	Weight	Commit date
Daniel Alexander; PF	Dripping Springs, Texas	Dripping Springs HS	6 ft 8 in (2.03 m)	192 lb (87 kg)	May 13, 2009
Daniel Alexander; PF	Recruit ratings: Scout: Rivals: (93)				
Keith Davis; PF	DeSoto, Texas	Lee (ME) HS	6 ft 9 in (2.06 m)	225 lb (102 kg)	Oct 5, 2009
Keith Davis; PF	Recruit ratings: Scout: Rivals: (89)				
Kourtney Roberson; C	Arcadia, Louisiana	Christian Life Center Academy (TX)	6 ft 9 in (2.06 m)	245 lb (111 kg)	Jun 9, 2008
Kourtney Roberson; C	Recruit ratings: Scout: Rivals: (93)				
Overall Recruiting Rankings:

== Roster ==
2011–12 Texas A&M Aggies men's basketball team
Players
Coaches

Pos.	#	Name	Height	Weight	Year	Hometown
F	15	Daniel Alexander	6 ft 8 in (2.03 m)	210 lb (95 kg)	Fr	Dripping Springs, Texas
G	24	Alex Baird	6 ft 1 in (1.85 m)	170 lb (77 kg)	Jr	Flower Mound, Texas
F	33	Marshall Carrell	6 ft 9 in (2.06 m)	230 lb (104 kg)	Sr	Paris, Texas
G	12	Andrew Darko	6 ft 1 in (1.85 m)	175 lb (79 kg)	RS Sr	Conroe, Texas
C	4	Keith Davis	6 ft 9 in (2.06 m)	220 lb (100 kg)	Fr	Dallas, Texas
G	5	Dash Harris	6 ft 1 in (1.85 m)	175 lb (79 kg)	Jr	Los Angeles, California
G	23	Naji Hibbert	6 ft 6 in (1.98 m)	200 lb (91 kg)	So	Baltimore, Maryland
G	11	B.J. Holmes	5 ft 11 in (1.8 m)	175 lb (79 kg)	Sr	Houston, Texas
F	42	Jarod Jahns	6 ft 5 in (1.96 m)	198 lb (90 kg)	Jr	Spring, Texas
G	2	Derrek Lewis	6 ft 5 in (1.96 m)	195 lb (88 kg)	Sr	Tulsa, Oklahoma
F	10	David Loubeau	6 ft 8 in (2.03 m)	230 lb (104 kg)	Jr	Miami, Florida
G	00	Blake McDonald	5 ft 10 in (1.78 m)	160 lb (73 kg)	Fr	Spring, Texas
F	22	Khris Middleton	6 ft 7 in (2.01 m)	215 lb (98 kg)	So	North Charleston, South Carolina
F	32	Kourtney Roberson	6 ft 9 in (2.06 m)	230 lb (104 kg)	Fr	Arcadia, Louisiana
G	31	Elston Turner	6 ft 4 in (1.93 m)	205 lb (93 kg)	Jr	Missouri City, Texas
F	35	Ray Turner	6 ft 8 in (2.03 m)	220 lb (100 kg)	So	Houston, Texas
F	45	Nathan Walkup	6 ft 7 in (2.01 m)	210 lb (95 kg)	Sr	Houston, Texas

Head coach

- Mark Turgeon (Kansas)

Assistant coach(es)

- Scott Spinelli (Boston University)
- Bill Walker (Missouri S&T)
- Pooh Williamson (Tulsa)

Legend

- (C) Team captain
- (S) Suspended
- (I) Ineligible
- (W) Walk-on
- Injured
- Current redshirt

Roster
Last update: 2011-07-30

== Schedule ==
Date time, TV	Rank^{#}	Opponent^{#}	Result	Record	Site (attendance) city, state
Exhibition
11/02/10*; 7:00 p.m.		St. Mary's (Texas)	W 70–53	0–0	Reed Arena (5,621); College Station, TX
Regular season
11/12/10*; 7:00 p.m.		Alcorn State	W 88–56	1–0	Reed Arena (7,010); College Station, TX
11/15/10*; 7:00 p.m., Southland TV		at Texas A&M–Corpus Christi	W 86–65	2–0	American Bank Center (6,071); Corpus Christi, TX
11/19/10*; 7:00 p.m.		Texas A&M International	W 77–46	3–0	Reed Arena (7,741); College Station, TX
11/25/10*; 11:00 a.m., ESPN2		vs. Boston College; Old Spice Classic opening round	L 65–67	3–1	HP Field House (3,018); Lake Buena Vista, FL
11/26/10*; 1:30 p.m., ESPNU		vs. Manhattan; Old Spice Classic second round	W 74–45	4–1	HP Field House (3,229); Lake Buena Vista, FL
11/28/10*; 10:00 a.m., ESPNU		vs. No. 21 Temple; Old Spice Classic consolation game	W 54–51	5–1	HP Field House (N/A); Lake Buena Vista, FL
12/02/10*; 7:00 p.m., FSSW		Stephen F. Austin	W 62–53	6–1	Reed Arena (5,755); College Station, TX
12/04/10*; 7:00 p.m.		Pacific	W 79–59	7–1	Reed Arena (6,683); College Station, TX
12/8/10*; 7:00 p.m., FSSW		Prairie View A&M	W 87–63	8–1	Reed Arena (6,270); College Station, TX
12/11/10*; 3:30 p.m., ESPN2		No. 21 Washington; Big 12/Pac-10 Hardwood Series	W 63–62	9–1	Reed Arena (10,296); College Station, TX
12/18/10*; 1:00 p.m., ESPN2	No. 25	vs. Arkansas; The Showcase	W 72–61 ^{OT}	10–1	American Airlines Center (11,077); Dallas, TX
12/21/10*; 7:00 p.m., FSSW	No. 25	Wagner	W 86–51	11–1	Reed Arena (8,007); College Station, TX
12/31/10*; 3:00 p.m.	No. 18	McNeese State	W 66–57	12–1	Reed Arena (7,747); College Station, TX
01/03/11*; 7:00 p.m.	No. 16	Nicholls State	W 66–55	13–1	Reed Arena (7,432); College Station, TX
01/08/11; 3:00 p.m., Big 12 Network	No. 16	at Oklahoma	W 69–51	14–1 (1–0)	Lloyd Noble Center (9,968); Norman, OK
01/12/11; 7:00 p.m., Big 12 Network	No. 14	Oklahoma State	W 71–48	15–1 (2–0)	Reed Arena (12,310); College Station, TX
01/15/11; 12:00 p.m., ESPN2	No. 14	No. 15 Missouri	W 91–89 ^{OT}	16–1 (3–0)	Reed Arena (11,005); College Station, TX
01/19/11; 8:00 p.m., ESPN2	No. 11	at No. 10 Texas; Lone Star Showdown	L 61–80	16-2 (3–1)	Frank Erwin Center (16,734); Austin, TX
01/22/11; 1:00 p.m., ESPN	No. 11	Kansas State	W 64–56	17–2 (4–1)	Reed Arena (12,715); College Station, TX
01/29/11; 1:00 p.m.	No. 13	at Nebraska	L 48–57	17–3 (4–2)	Bob Devaney Sports Center (11,101); Lincoln, NE
01/31/11; 8:00 p.m., ESPN	No. 16	No. 3 Texas; Lone Star Showdown	L 49–69	17–4 (4–3)	Reed Arena (13,300); College Station, TX
02/05/11; 1:00 p.m., ESPN	No. 16	Baylor; Battle of the Brazos	L 74–76 ^{OT}	17–5 (4–4)	Reed Arena (10,398); College Station, TX
02/09/11; 8:00 p.m., ESPNU	No. 22	at Colorado	W 73–70 ^{OT}	18–5 (5–4)	Coors Events Center (7,517); Boulder, CO
02/12/11; 12:30 p.m., Big 12 Network	No. 22	at Texas Tech	W 70–67	19–5 (6–4)	United Spirit Arena (9,091); Lubbock, TX
02/16/11; 7:00 p.m., Big 12 Network	No. 21	Iowa State	W 71–66	20–5 (7–4)	Reed Arena (7,041); College Station, TX
02/19/11; 8:00 p.m., ESPNU	No. 21	at Oklahoma State	W 67–66	21–5 (8–4)	Gallagher-Iba Arena (12,234); Stillwater, OK
02/23/11; 6:30 p.m., FSSW	No. 21	Oklahoma	W 61–47	22–5 (9–4)	Reed Arena (8,315); College Station, TX
02/26/11; 8:00 p.m., ESPNU	No. 21	at Baylor; Battle of the Brazos	L 51–58	22–6 (9–5)	Ferrell Center (9,338); Waco, TX
03/02/11; 8:00 p.m., ESPN2	No. 24	at No. 2 Kansas	L 51–64	22–7 (9–6)	Allen Fieldhouse (16,300); Lawrence, KS
03/05/11; 12:30 p.m., Big 12 Network	No. 24	Texas Tech	W 66–54	23–7 (10–6)	Reed Arena (12,377); College Station, TX
Big 12 Tournament
03/10/11; 8:30 p.m., ESPN2	(3)	vs. (6) Missouri; Big 12 Quarterfinals	W 86–71	24–7	Sprint Center (18,910); Kansas City, MO
03/11/11; 8:30 p.m., Big 12 Network	(3)	vs. (2) No. 10 Texas; Big 12 Semifinals	L 58–70	24–8	Sprint Center (18,910); Kansas City, MO
NCAA Tournament
03/18/11*; 3:10 p.m., TBS	(7 SW) No. 24	vs. (10 SW) Florida State; NCAA Second Round	L 50–57	24–9	United Center (17,352); Chicago, IL
*Non-conference game. ^{#}Rankings from AP Poll. (#) Tournament seedings in parentheses. All times are in Central Standard Time.
