= 2010–11 Baylor Bears basketball team =

American college basketball season

2010–11 Baylor Bears men's basketball
- Conference: Big 12 Conference
- Record: 18–13 (7–9 Big 12)
- Head coach: Scott Drew (8th season)
- Assistant coaches: Mark Morefield; Jerome Tang; Paul Mills
- Home arena: Ferrell Center

2010–11 Big 12 men's basketball standings
	Conf.				Overall
Team	W		L	PCT	W		L	PCT
No. 2 Kansas †	14	–	2	.875	35	–	3	.921
No. 8 Texas	13	–	3	.813	28	–	8	.778
No. 24 Texas A&M	10	–	6	.625	24	–	9	.727
No. 21 Kansas State	10	–	6	.625	23	–	11	.676
Colorado	8	–	8	.500	24	–	14	.632
Missouri	8	–	8	.500	23	–	11	.676
Baylor	7	–	9	.438	18	–	13	.581
Nebraska	7	–	9	.438	19	–	13	.594
Oklahoma State	6	–	10	.375	20	–	14	.588
Oklahoma	5	–	11	.313	14	–	18	.438
Texas Tech	5	–	11	.313	13	–	19	.406
Iowa State	3	–	13	.188	16	–	16	.500
† 2011 Big 12 Tournament winner Rankings from AP poll

The 2010–11 Baylor Bears basketball team represented Baylor University in the 2010–11 NCAA Division I men's basketball season. This was head coach Scott Drew's eighth season at Baylor. The Bears compete in the Big 12 Conference and played their home games at the Ferrell Center.

== Roster ==
#	Name	Height	Weight (lbs.)	Position	Class	Hometown	Previous Team(s)
3	Fred Ellis	6'6"	215	F	Jr.	Sacramento, CA, U.S.	Sacramento HS
4	Quincy Acy	6'7"	225	F	Jr.	Mesquite, TX, U.S.	Horn HS
5	Perry Jones III	6'11"	235	F	Fr.	Duncanville, Texas, U.S.	Duncanville HS
11	J'mison Morgan	6'11"	265	F C	So.	Dallas, Texas, U.S.	Oak Cliff HS; UCLA
12	Nolan Dennis	6'6"	175	G	So.	North Richland Hills, TX, U.S.	Richland HS
13	Brady Heslip	6'2"	190	G	So.	Burlington, Ontario, Canada	New Hampton (NH); Boston College
14	Dragan Sekelja	7'0"	265	C	So.	Zagreb, Croatia	Sportska Gimnazija
15	Levi Norwood	6'1"	180	G	Fr.	Woodway, Texas, U.S.	Midway HS
20	Stargell Love	6'3"	175	G	Fr.	Winston-Salem, North Carolina, U.S.	Quality Education Academy
22	A. J. Walton	6'1"	185	G	So.	Little Rock, AR, U.S.	Hall HS
23	Jacob Neubert	6'5"	190	F	So.	Waco, Texas, U.S.	Midway HS
24	LaceDarius Dunn	6'4"	200	G	Sr.	Monroe, LA, U.S.	Excelsior Christian School
34	Cory Jefferson	6'9"	200	F	So.	Killeen, TX, U.S.	Killeen HS
41	Anthony Jones	6'10"	190	F	Jr.	Houston, TX, U.S.	Yates HS

- J'mison Morgan left UCLA after having been dismissed from the team near the end of the 2009–10 season. He enrolled at Baylor in summer 2010 to be closer to his ill grandmother, who was his legal guardian. The NCAA granted him a waiver from its normal transfer rules that allowed him to play immediately at Baylor.

== Schedule and results ==
- All times are Central

Date time, TV	Rank^{#}	Opponent^{#}	Result	Record	Site (attendance) city, state
Exhibition
11/4/2010*; 7:00pm		Midwestern State	W 68–59		Ferrell Center (5,510); Waco, TX
Regular Season
11/12/2010*; 8:30pm	No. 16	Grambling State	W 87–52	1–0	Ferrell Center (7,242); Waco, TX
11/15/2010*; 1:00pm, ESPN	No. 17	La Salle; ESPN College Tip-Off Marathon	W 74–64	2–0	Ferrell Center (5,105); Waco, TX
11/18/2010*; 7:00pm	No. 17	Jackson State	W 63–49	3–0	Ferrell Center (5,951); Waco, TX
11/22/2010*; 7:00pm	No. 12	Lipscomb	W 72–60	4–0	Ferrell Center (6,453); Waco, TX
11/29/2010*; 7:00pm	No. 11	Prairie View A&M	W 90–45	5–0	Ferrell Center (5,638); Waco, TX
12/2/2010*; 6:00pm, ESPN2	No. 11	Arizona State; Big 12/Pac-10 Hardwood Series	W 68–54	6–0	Ferrell Center (7,083); Waco, TX
12/15/2010*; 7:00pm	No. 9	Bethune–Cookman	W 83–39	7–0	Ferrell Center (5,653); Waco, TX
12/18/2010*; 3:30pm, ESPN2	No. 9	vs. Gonzaga; The Showcase	L 64–68	7–1	American Airlines Center (11,077); Dallas, TX
12/22/2010*; 4:00pm, ESPNU	No. 15	vs. San Diego; Diamond Head Classic first round	W 83–50	8–1	Stan Sheriff Center (7,391); Honolulu, HI
12/23/2010*; 6:00pm, ESPNU	No. 15	vs. Washington State; Diamond Head Classic second round	L 71–77	8–2	Stan Sheriff Center (7,179); Honolulu, HI
12/25/2010*; 6:30pm, ESPN2	No. 15	vs. Florida State; Diamond Head Classic 3rd place game	L 61–68	8–3	Stan Sheriff Center (NA); Honolulu, HI
01/02/2011*; 2:30pm, FSSW	No. 23	Texas Southern	W 68–60	9–3	Ferrell Center (5,437); Waco, TX
01/04/2011*; 7:00pm, FSSW		Morgan State	W 89–72	10–3	Ferrell Center (5,277); Waco, TX
01/08/2011; 1:00pm, ESPNU		at Texas Tech	W 71–59	11–3 (1–0)	United Spirit Arena (8,857); Lubbock, TX
01/11/2011; 8:00pm, FSSW		Oklahoma	W 74–61	12–3 (2–0)	Ferrell Center (7,572); Waco, TX
01/15/2011; 5:00pm		at Iowa State	L 57–72	12–4 (2–1)	Hilton Coliseum (11,734); Ames, IA
01/17/2011; 8:30pm, ESPN		No. 2 Kansas	L 65–85	12–5 (2–2)	Ferrell Center (10,596); Waco, TX
01/22/2011; 3:00pm, Big 12 Network		Oklahoma State	W 76–57	13–5 (3–2)	Ferrell Center (8,045); Waco, TX
01/24/2011; 8:00pm, ESPN		at Kansas State	L 61–69	13–6 (3–3)	Bramlage Coliseum (12,528); Manhattan, KS
01/29/2011; 12:30pm, Big 12 Network		Colorado	W 70–66	14–6 (4–3)	Ferrell Center (6,095); Waco, TX
02/02/2011; 6:00pm, ESPN2		at Oklahoma	L 66–73	14–7 (4–4)	Lloyd Noble Center (6,000); Norman, OK
02/05/2011; 1:00pm, ESPN		at No. 16 Texas A&M	W 76–74 ^{OT}	15–7 (5–4)	Reed Arena (10,398); College Station, TX
02/09/2011; 7:00pm, Big 12 Network		Nebraska	W 74–70	16–7 (6–4)	Ferrell Center (6,058); Waco, TX
02/12/2011; 3:00pm, ESPN		at No. 3 Texas	L 60–69	16–8 (6–5)	Frank Erwin Center (16,734); Austin, TX
02/15/2011*; 7:00pm		Wayland Baptist	W 64–50	17–8 (6–5)	Ferrell Center (5,037); Waco, TX
02/19/2011; 7:00pm, FSSW		Texas Tech	L 69–78	17–9 (6–6)	Ferrell Center (8,692); Waco, TX
02/23/2011; 8:00pm, ESPN2		at No. 20 Missouri	L 59–77	17–10 (6–7)	Mizzou Arena (14,297); Columbia, MO
02/26/2011; 7:00pm, ESPNU		No. 21 Texas A&M	W 58–51	18–10 (7–7)	Ferrell Center (9,338); Waco, TX
03/01/2011; 6:00pm, ESPN2		at Oklahoma State	L 60–71	18–11 (7–8)	Gallagher-Iba Arena (10,076); Stillwater, OK
03/05/2011; 8:00pm, ESPN		No. 7 Texas; ESPN College GameDay	L 54–60	18–12 (7–9)	Ferrell Center (10,627); Waco, TX
2011 Big 12 men's basketball tournament
03/09/2011; 6:00pm, Big 12 Network		vs. Oklahoma; First Round	L 67–84	18–13	Sprint Center (18,910); Kansas City, MO
*Non-conference game. ^{#}Rankings from AP Poll. (#) Tournament seedings in parentheses.
