= 2010–11 Big 12 Conference men's basketball season =

- League: NCAA Division I
- Sport: Basketball
- Duration: January 8, 2011 through March 5, 2011
- Teams: 12

Regular Season
- Regular Season Champion: Kansas
- Season MVP: Marcus Morris

Tournament
- Champions: Kansas
- Runners-up: Texas
- Finals MVP: Marcus Morris

Basketball seasons
- ← 2009–10 2011–12 →

2010–11 Big 12 men's basketball standings
	Conf.				Overall
Team	W		L	PCT	W		L	PCT
No. 2 Kansas †	14	–	2	.875	35	–	3	.921
No. 8 Texas	13	–	3	.813	28	–	8	.778
No. 24 Texas A&M	10	–	6	.625	24	–	9	.727
No. 21 Kansas State	10	–	6	.625	23	–	11	.676
Colorado	8	–	8	.500	24	–	14	.632
Missouri	8	–	8	.500	23	–	11	.676
Baylor	7	–	9	.438	18	–	13	.581
Nebraska	7	–	9	.438	19	–	13	.594
Oklahoma State	6	–	10	.375	20	–	14	.588
Oklahoma	5	–	11	.313	14	–	18	.438
Texas Tech	5	–	11	.313	13	–	19	.406
Iowa State	3	–	13	.188	16	–	16	.500
† 2011 Big 12 Tournament winner Rankings from AP poll

The 2010–11 Big 12 Conference men's basketball season marked the 15th season of Big 12 Conference basketball.

This was the final season for the Big 12 as a 12-team conference, as two schools departed at the end of the 2010–11 academic year. Colorado joined the Pacific-10 Conference, which became the Pac-12, while Nebraska joined the Big Ten Conference.

== Preseason ==
=== Big 12 Coaches Poll ===
Rank	Team	Votes
1	Kansas State (10)	119
2	Kansas (2)	109
3	Texas	99
4	Baylor	96
5	Missouri	82
6	Texas A&M	69
7	Texas Tech	52
8	Oklahoma State	51
9	Colorado	46
10	Nebraska	31
11	Oklahoma	27
12	Iowa State	11

=== All-Big 12 players ===
- Jacob Pullen, Kansas State (unanimous)
- LaceDarius Dunn, Baylor (unanimous)
- Cory Higgins, Colorado
- Marcus Morris, Kansas
- Curtis Kelly, Kansas State

Player of the Year

- Marcus Morris, Kansas

Newcomer of the Year

- Ricardo Ratliffe, Missouri

Freshman of the Year

- Josh Selby, Kansas

== Regular season ==
=== Rankings ===
AP Poll	Pre	Wk 1	Wk 2	Wk 3	Wk 4	Wk 5	Wk 6	Wk 7	Wk 8	Wk 9	Wk 10	Wk 11	Wk 12	Wk 13	Wk 14	Wk 15	Wk 16	Wk 17	Wk 18
Baylor	16	17	12	11	10	9	15	RV	RV	RV	RV	RV		RV	RV				
Colorado	RV	RV									RV								RV
Iowa State			RV	RV															
Kansas	7	7	6	4	4	3	3	3	3	3	2	6	2	2	1	3	2	2	2
Kansas State	3	3	4	5	5	6	11	17	17	21	RV						RV	19	21
Missouri	15	15	11	9	15	13	9	10	9	15	13	11	14	19	20	20	22	RV	RV
Nebraska																			
Oklahoma																			
Oklahoma State							RV	RV		RV									
Texas	RV	RV	20	19	25	22	18	13	12	12	10	7	3	3	3	5	7	10	8
Texas A&M				RV	RV	25	25	18	16	14	11	13	16	22	21	21	24	RV	24
Texas Tech																			

=== In-season honors ===
Players of the week

Throughout the conference regular season, the Big 12 offices name a player of the week each Monday.

- Nov. 15 – Jordan Hamilton, Texas
- Nov. 22 – Jordan Hamilton, Texas
- Nov. 29 – Marcus Morris, Kansas
- Dec. 6 – Marcus Denmon, Missouri
- Dec. 13 – Marshall Moses, Oklahoma State
- Dec. 20 – Khris Middleton, Texas A&M
- Dec. 27 – Markieff Morris, Kansas
- Jan. 3 – Marcus Denmon, Missouri
- Jan. 10 – Alec Burks, Colorado
- Jan. 17 – Marcus Morris, Kansas
- Jan. 24 – Jordan Hamilton, Texas
- Jan. 31 – Mike Singletary, Texas Tech
- Feb. 7 – Jacob Pullen, Kansas State
- Feb. 14 – Marcus Morris, Kansas
- Feb. 21 – Jacob Pullen, Kansas State
- Feb. 28 – Alec Burks, Colorado

== See also ==
- 2010–11 NCAA Division I men's basketball season
- 2011 Big 12 men's basketball tournament
