= 2010–11 Oklahoma State Cowboys basketball team =

American college basketball season

2010–11 Oklahoma State Cowboys basketball

NIT Boston College Bracket, Second Round
- Conference: Big 12 Conference
- Record: 20–14 (6–10 Big 12)
- Head coach: Travis Ford (3rd season)
- Assistant coaches: Butch Pierre; Chris Ferguson; Steve Middleton
- Home arena: Gallagher-Iba Arena

2010–11 Big 12 men's basketball standings
	Conf.				Overall
Team	W		L	PCT	W		L	PCT
No. 2 Kansas †	14	–	2	.875	35	–	3	.921
No. 8 Texas	13	–	3	.813	28	–	8	.778
No. 24 Texas A&M	10	–	6	.625	24	–	9	.727
No. 21 Kansas State	10	–	6	.625	23	–	11	.676
Colorado	8	–	8	.500	24	–	14	.632
Missouri	8	–	8	.500	23	–	11	.676
Baylor	7	–	9	.438	18	–	13	.581
Nebraska	7	–	9	.438	19	–	13	.594
Oklahoma State	6	–	10	.375	20	–	14	.588
Oklahoma	5	–	11	.313	14	–	18	.438
Texas Tech	5	–	11	.313	13	–	19	.406
Iowa State	3	–	13	.188	16	–	16	.500
† 2011 Big 12 Tournament winner Rankings from AP poll

The 2010–11 Oklahoma State Cowboys basketball team represented Oklahoma State University in the 2010–11 NCAA Division I men's basketball season. This was head coach Travis Ford's third season at Oklahoma State. The Cowboys competed in the Big 12 Conference and played their home games at the Gallagher-Iba Arena. They finished the season 20-14, 6-10 in Big 12 play to finish in seventh place. They advanced to the quarterfinals of the Big 12 tournament where they lost to Kansas. They did not receive an at-large invitation to the 2011 NCAA tournament, but did receive an invitation to the 2011 National Invitation Tournament where they lost to Washington State in the second round.

== Pre-season ==
=== Departures ===
Name	Number	Pos.	Height	Weight	Year	Hometown	Notes
Obi Muonelo	2	G	6'5"	220	Senior	Edmond, Oklahoma	Graduated
Torin Walker	10	F	6'11"	245	Freshman	Columbus, Georgia	Transferred- Middle Tennessee
James Anderson	23	G	6'6"	210	Junior	Junction City, Arkansas	Drafted by San Antonio Spurs
Garrett Thomas	25	G	6'2"	180	Junior	Edmond, Oklahoma	Left team
Steven Cantrell	41	F	6'6"	210	Sophomore	Broken Arrow, Oklahoma	Left team
Lee Ledford	43	G	6'0"	180	Sophomore	Perkins, Oklahoma	Left team

=== Recruits ===
College recruiting information
Name	Hometown	School	Height	Weight	Commit date
Markel Brown; SG	Alexandria, LA	Peabody Magnet High School	6 ft 3 in (1.91 m)	190 lb (86 kg)	Jun 10, 2009
Markel Brown; SG	Recruit ratings: Scout: Rivals: (89)				
Michael Cobbins; PF	Amarillo, TX	Palo Duro High School	6 ft 8 in (2.03 m)	230 lb (100 kg)	Sep 7, 2009
Michael Cobbins; PF	Recruit ratings: Scout: Rivals: (94)				
Jean-Paul Olukemi; SF	LaHabra, CA	Peabody Magnet High School	6 ft 6 in (1.98 m)	215 lb (98 kg)	Sep 21, 2009
Jean-Paul Olukemi; SF	Recruit ratings: Scout: Rivals: (JC)				
Brian Williams; SF	Baton Rouge, LA	Glen Oaks High School	6 ft 5 in (1.96 m)	210 lb (95 kg)	Jun 5, 2009
Brian Williams; SF	Recruit ratings: Scout: Rivals: (90)				
Darrell Williams; PF	Chicago, IL	Midland College	6 ft 8 in (2.03 m)	245 lb (111 kg)	Nov 25, 2009
Darrell Williams; PF	Recruit ratings: Scout: Rivals: (JC)				
Overall recruit ranking: Scout: 27 Rivals: 27 ESPN: 24
Note: In many cases, Scout, Rivals, 247Sports, On3, and ESPN may conflict in their listings of height and weight.; In these cases, the average was taken. ESPN grades are on a 100-point scale.; Sources: "Oklahoma State 2012 Basketball Commitments". Rivals.; "2011 Oklahoma State Basketball Commits". Scout.; "ESPN". ESPN.; "Scout.com Team Recruiting Rankings". Scout.; "2010 Team Ranking". Rivals.

== Roster ==
2011–12 Oklahoma State Cowboys men's basketball team
Players
Coaches

Midland

Pos.	#	Name	Height	Weight	Year	Previous school	Hometown
G	0	Jean-Paul Olukemi	6 ft 6 in (1.98 m)	215 lb (98 kg)	So	Stoneridge Prep; Vincennes University	LaHabra, CA
G	1	Reger Dowell	6 ft 1 in (1.85 m)	183 lb (83 kg)	So	Duncanville High School	Duncanville, TX
G	12	Fred Gulley	6 ft 2 in (1.88 m)	182 lb (83 kg)	So	Fayetteville High School (Arkansas)	Fayetteville, AR
F	5	Jarred Shaw	6 ft 10 in (2.08 m)	235 lb (107 kg)	So	David W. Carter	Dallas, TX
G	12	Keiton Page	5 ft 9 in (1.75 m)	165 lb (75 kg)	Jr	Pawnee High School	Pawnee, OK
G	14	Ray Penn	5 ft 9 in (1.75 m)	160 lb (73 kg)	So	Travis	Houston, TX
G	15	Nick Sidorakis	6 ft 4 in (1.93 m)	195 lb (88 kg)	Sr	Jenks	Jenks, OK
F	20	Michael Cobbins	6 ft 8 in (2.03 m)	230 lb (104 kg)	Fr	Palo Duro	Amarillo, TX
G	22	Markel Brown	6 ft 3 in (1.91 m)	190 lb (86 kg)	Fr	Peabody Magnet	Alexandria, LA
F	25	Darrell Williams	6 ft 8 in (2.03 m)	245 lb (111 kg)	Jr	Dunbar Vocational	Chicago, IL
F	31	Matt Pilgram	6 ft 8 in (2.03 m)	255 lb (116 kg)	Sr	Bridgton Academy; Hampton University	Cincinnati, OH
F	31	Brian Williams	6 ft 5 in (1.96 m)	210 lb (95 kg)	RS Fr	Glen Oaks	Baton Rouge, LA
G	32	Roger Franklin	6 ft 5 in (1.96 m)	220 lb (100 kg)	So	Duncanville	Duncanville, TX
F	33	Marshall Moses	6 ft 7 in (2.01 m)	255 lb (116 kg)	Sr	The Patterson School	Aiken, South Carolina
F	42	Songo Adoki	6 ft 5 in (1.96 m)	205 lb (93 kg)	Sr	Putnam City	Oklahoma City, OK

Head coach

- Travis Ford (Kentucky)

Assistant coach(es)

- Butch Pierre (Mississippi State)
- Chris Ferguson (Cumberlands)
- Steve Middleton (Southern Illinois)

Legend

- (C) Team captain
- (S) Suspended
- (I) Ineligible
- (W) Walk-on
- Injured
- Current redshirt

== Rankings ==
Ranking movements Legend: ██ Increase in ranking ██ Decrease in ranking — = Not ranked
	Week																				
Poll	Pre	1	2	3	4	5	6	7	8	9	10	11	12	13	14	15	16	17	18	19	Final
AP Poll	—	—	—	—	—	—	ZNR	—	—	—	—	—	—	—	—	—	—	—	—	—	—
Coaches Poll	—	—	—	—	—	—	—	—	—	—	—	—	—	—	—	—	—	—	—	—	—

== Schedule and results ==
- All times are Central

Date time, TV	Rank^{#}	Opponent^{#}	Result	Record	Site (attendance) city, state
Non-conference regular season
11/13/2010*		Houston Baptist	W 86-73	1–0	Gallagher-Iba Arena; Stillwater, OK
11/17/2010*		Texas A&M–Corpus Christi	W 68-58	2–0	Gallagher-Iba Arena; Stillwater, OK
11/21/2010*; 7:00 pm		Nicholls State	W 76-56	3–0	Gallagher-Iba Arena; Stillwater, OK
11/25/2010*		vs. DePaul; 76 Classic First Round	W 60-56	4-0	Anaheim Convention Center; Anaheim, CA
11/26/2010*; 12:30 pm, ESPN		vs. Virginia Tech; 76 Classic Semifinals	L 51-56	4-1	Anaheim Convention Center; Anaheim, CA
11/28/2010*; 7:00 pm		vs. Murray State; 76 Classic 3rd Place Game	W 66-49	5-1	Anaheim Convention Center; Anaheim, CA
12/01/2010*		Central Arkansas	W 69-57	6-1	Gallagher-Iba Arena; Stillwater, OK
12/04/2010*; 8:00 pm		at La Salle	W 92-87 ^{2OT}	7-1	Tom Gola Arena; Philadelphia, PA
12/08/2010*		vs. Tulsa	W 71-54	8-1	Bank of Oklahoma Center; Tulsa, OK
12/11/2010*; 7:00 pm, KY3		Missouri State	W 84-70	9-1	Gallagher-Iba Arena (10,401); Stillwater, OK
12/18/2010*; 5:30 pm		vs. Alabama; All-College Basketball Classic	W 68-60	10-1	Oklahoma City Arena (10,625); Oklahoma City, OK
12/21/2010*		vs. Stanford	W 79-68	11-1	Gallagher-Iba Arena; Stillwater, OK
12/31/2010*; 9:00 pm, ESPN2		at Gonzaga	L 52-73	11-2	McCarthey Athletic Center (6,000); Spokane, WA
01/03/2011*		UTSA	W 79-63	12-2	Gallagher-Iba Arena; Stillwater, OK
Big 12 regular season
01/08/2011; 12:00 pm, ESPN2		No. 17 Kansas State	W 76-62	13-2 (1-0)	Gallagher-Iba Arena (11,300); Stillwater, OK
01/12/2011; 7:00 pm, Big 12 Network		at No. 14 Texas A&M	L 48-71	13-3 (1–1)	Reed Arena (12,310); College Station, TX
01/15/2011; 12:30 pm, Big 12 Network		at Colorado	L 71-75	13-4 (1-2)	Coors Events/Conference Center (11,096); Boulder, CO
01/19/2011; 8:00 pm, ESPNU		Iowa State	W 96-87 ^{OT}	14-4 (2–2)	Gallagher-Iba Arena (9,922); Stillwater, OK
01/22/2011; 3:00 pm, Big 12 Network		at Baylor	L 57-76	14-5 (2–3)	Ferrell Center (8,045); Waco, TX
01/26/2011; 6:30 pm, ESPN		No. 7 Texas	L 46-61	14-6 (2-4)	Gallagher-Iba Arena (13,611); Stillwater, OK
01/29/2011; 3:00 pm		at Texas Tech	L 74-75 ^{OT}	14-7 (2-5)	United Spirit Arena (9,022); Lubbock, TX
02/02/2011; 8:00 pm, ESPN2		No. 14 Missouri	W 76-70	15-7 (3-5)	Gallagher-Iba Arena (10,515); Stillwater, OK
02/05/2011; Big 12 Network		Oklahoma; Bedlam Series	W 81-75	16-7 (4-5)	Gallagher-Iba Arena; Stillwater, OK
02/12/2011; 6:00 pm, FSMW		at Nebraska	L 54-65	16-8 (4-6)	Bob Devaney Sports Center (9,547); Lincoln, NE
02/16/2011; 8:00 pm, ESPN2		at No. 3 Texas	L 55-73	16-9 (4-7)	Frank Erwin Center (15,333); Austin, TX
02/19/2011; 8:00 pm, ESPNU		No. 21 Texas A&M	L 66-67	16-10 (4-8)	Gallagher-Iba Arena (12,234); Stillwater, OK
02/21/2011; 8:00 pm, ESPN		at No. 3 Kansas	L 65-92	16-11 (4-9)	Allen Fieldhouse (16,300); Lawrence, KS
02/26/2011; 12:30 pm, Big 12 Network		Texas Tech	W 70-68	17-11 (5-9)	Gallagher-Iba Arena (10,937); Stillwater, OK
03/01/2011; 6:00 pm, ESPN2		at Baylor	W 71-60	18-11 (6-9)	Gallagher-Iba Arena (10,076); Stillwater, OK
03/05/2011; Big 12 Network		at Oklahoma	L 61-64	18-12 (6-10)	Lloyd Noble Center; Norman, OK
Big 12 tournament
03/09/2011; 11:30 am, Big 12 Network	(9)	vs. (8) Nebraska; Big 12 First Round	W 53-52	19-12	Sprint Center (18,910); Kansas City, MO
03/10/2011; 11:30 am, ESPNU	(9)	vs. (1) No. 2 Kansas; Big 12 Quarterfinals	L 62-63	19-13	Sprint Center (18,910); Kansas City, MO
NIT
03/15/2011*; 6:30 pm, ESPN	(3 BC)	(6 BC) Harvard; NIT First Round	W 71-54	20–13	Gallagher-Iba Arena (5,342); Stillwater, OK
03/21/2011*; 10:30 pm, ESPN2	(3 BC)	at (2 BC) Washington State; NCAA Second Round	L 64-74	20–14	Friel Court (5,201); Pullman, WA
*Non-conference game. ^{#}Rankings from AP poll. (#) Tournament seedings in parentheses. BC=NIT Boston College bracket. All times are in Central Time.

== See also ==
- Oklahoma State Cowboys basketball (men's basketball only)
- 2010–11 Big 12 Conference men's basketball season
