= 2010–11 Texas Longhorns men's basketball team =

American college basketball season

2010–11 Texas Longhorns men's basketball

NCAA Tournament, Round of 32
- Conference: Big 12
- South

Ranking
- Coaches: No. 16
- AP: No. 8
- Record: 28–8 (13–3 Big 12)
- Head coach: Rick Barnes
- Assistant coaches: Rodney Terry; Russell Springmann; Chris Ogden
- Home arena: Frank Erwin Center

2010–11 Big 12 men's basketball standings
| | Conf. | | | | Overall |
| Team | W | | L | PCT | W | | L | PCT |
|---|---|---|---|---|---|---|---|---|
| No. 2 Kansas † | 14 | – | 2 | .875 | 35 | – | 3 | .921 |
| No. 8 Texas | 13 | – | 3 | .813 | 28 | – | 8 | .778 |
| No. 24 Texas A&M | 10 | – | 6 | .625 | 24 | – | 9 | .727 |
| No. 21 Kansas State | 10 | – | 6 | .625 | 23 | – | 11 | .676 |
| Colorado | 8 | – | 8 | .500 | 24 | – | 14 | .632 |
| Missouri | 8 | – | 8 | .500 | 23 | – | 11 | .676 |
| Baylor | 7 | – | 9 | .438 | 18 | – | 13 | .581 |
| Nebraska | 7 | – | 9 | .438 | 19 | – | 13 | .594 |
| Oklahoma State | 6 | – | 10 | .375 | 20 | – | 14 | .588 |
| Oklahoma | 5 | – | 11 | .313 | 14 | – | 18 | .438 |
| Texas Tech | 5 | – | 11 | .313 | 13 | – | 19 | .406 |
| Iowa State | 3 | – | 13 | .188 | 16 | – | 16 | .500 |
† 2011 Big 12 Tournament winner Rankings from AP poll

The 2010–11 Texas Longhorns men's basketball team represented the University of Texas in the 2010–11 NCAA Division I men's basketball season. Their head coach was Rick Barnes, who was in his 13th year. The team played their home games at the Frank Erwin Center in Austin, Texas and were members of the Big 12 Conference. They finished the season 28–8, 13–3 in Big 12 play, and lost in the championship game of the 2011 Big 12 men's basketball tournament to Kansas. They received an at-large bid to the 2011 NCAA Division I men's basketball tournament where they defeated Oakland in the second round before falling in the third round to Arizona.

== Recruiting ==
College recruiting
| Name | Hometown | School | Height | Weight | Commit date |
|---|---|---|---|---|---|
| Cory Joseph; PG | Pickering, ON | Findlay Prep | 6 ft 3 in (1.91 m) | 180 lb (82 kg) | Apr 23, 2010 |
| Cory Joseph; PG | Recruit ratings: Scout: Rivals: (96) | | | | |
| Tristan Thompson; PF | Brampton, ON | Findlay Prep | 6 ft 9 in (2.06 m) | 235 lb (107 kg) | Sep 19, 2009 |
| Tristan Thompson; PF | Recruit ratings: Scout: Rivals: (97) | | | | |
Overall recruit ranking: Scout: 12 Rivals: 8 ESPN: 8
Note: In many cases, Scout, Rivals, 247Sports, On3, and ESPN may conflict in their listings of height and weight.; In these cases, the average was taken. ESPN grades are on a 100-point scale.; Sources: "Texas 2010 Basketball Commitments". Rivals.; "2010 Texas Basketball Commits". Scout.; "ESPN". ESPN.; "Scout.com Team Recruiting Rankings". Scout.; "2010 Team Ranking". Rivals.

== Schedule ==
| Date time, TV | Rank^{#} | Opponent^{#} | Result | Record | Site (attendance) city, state |
Regular season
| 11/08/2010*; 8:00 pm, ESPNU | | Navy; 2K Sports Classic | W 83–52 | 1–0 | Frank Erwin Center (10,452); Austin, TX |
| 11/10/2010*; 8:00 pm, ESPNU | | Louisiana Tech; 2K Sports Classic | W 89–58 | 2–0 | Frank Erwin Center (5,619); Austin, TX |
| 11/18/2010*; 8:00 pm, ESPN2 | | vs. No. 13 Illinois; 2K Sports Classic Semifinals | W 90–84 ^{OT} | 3–0 | Madison Square Garden (12,210); New York, NY |
| 11/19/2010*; 6:00 pm, ESPN2 | | vs. No. 5 Pittsburgh; 2K Sports Classic Championship Game | L 66–68 | 3–1 | Madison Square Garden (11,723); New York, NY |
| 11/23/2010*; 7:00 pm, Longhorn Sports Network | No. 20 | Sam Houston State | W 84–50 | 4–1 | Frank Erwin Center (10,683); Austin, TX |
| 11/27/2010*; 3:00 pm, Longhorn Sports Network | No. 20 | Rice | W 62–59 | 5–1 | Frank Erwin Center (10,969); Austin, TX |
| 12/01/2010*; 7:00 pm, Longhorn Sports Network | No. 19 | Lamar | W 76–55 | 6–1 | Frank Erwin Center (9,898); Austin, TX |
| 12/05/2010*; 9:30 pm, FSN | No. 19 | at USC; Big 12/Pac-10 Hardwood Series | L 56–73 | 6–2 | Galen Center (4,127); Los Angeles, CA |
| 12/11/2010*; 3:00 pm, Longhorn Sports Network | No. 25 | Texas State | W 101–65 | 7–2 | Frank Erwin Center (11,932); Austin, TX |
| 12/14/2010*; 7:00 pm, Longhorn Sports Network | No. 22 | North Florida | W 70–48 | 8–2 | Frank Erwin Center (10,184); Austin, TX |
| 12/18/2010*; 3:00 pm, CBS | No. 22 | vs. North Carolina | W 78–76 | 9–2 | Greensboro Coliseum (20,787); Greensboro, NC |
| 12/22/2010*; 6:00 pm, ESPN2 | No. 18 | at No. 12 Michigan State | W 67–55 | 10–2 | Breslin Center (14,797); East Lansing, MI |
| 12/31/2010*; 1:00 pm, Longhorn Sports Network | No. 13 | Coppin State | W 95–75 | 11–2 | Frank Erwin Center (12,804); Austin, TX |
| 01/04/2011*; 8:00 pm, ESPNU | No. 12 | Arkansas | W 79–46 | 12–2 | Frank Erwin Center (11,881); Austin, TX |
| 01/08/2011*; 2:30 pm, ESPN | No. 12 | No. 8 Connecticut | L 81–82 ^{OT} | 12–3 | Frank Erwin Center (16,734); Austin, TX |
| 01/11/2011; 6:00 pm, ESPN2 | No. 12 | at Texas Tech | W 83–52 | 13–3 (1–0) | United Spirit Arena (9,366); Lubbock, TX |
| 01/15/2011; 3:00 pm, Big 12 Network | No. 12 | Oklahoma | W 66–46 | 14–3 (2–0) | Frank Erwin Center (16,599); Austin, TX |
| 01/19/2011; 8:00 pm, ESPN2 | No. 10 | No. 11 Texas A&M | W 81–60 | 15–3 (3–0) | Frank Erwin Center (16,734); Austin, TX |
| 01/22/2011; 3:00 pm, CBS | No. 10 | at No. 2 Kansas | W 74–63 | 16–3 (4–0) | Allen Fieldhouse (16,300); Lawrence, KS |
| 01/26/2011; 6:30 pm, ESPN | No. 7 | at Oklahoma State | W 61–46 | 17–3 (5–0) | Gallagher-Iba Arena (13,611); Stillwater, OK |
| 01/29/2011; 8:00 pm, ESPNU | No. 7 | No. 11 Missouri | W 71–58 | 18–3 (6–0) | Frank Erwin Center (16,734); Austin, TX |
| 01/31/2011; 8:00 pm, ESPN | No. 3 | at No. 16 Texas A&M | W 69–49 | 19–3 (7–0) | Reed Arena (13,300); College Station, TX |
| 02/05/2011; 8:00 pm, ESPNU | No. 3 | Texas Tech | W 76–60 | 20–3 (8–0) | Frank Erwin Center (15,542); Austin, TX |
| 02/09/2011; 8:00 pm, ESPN2 | No. 3 | at Oklahoma | W 68–52 | 21–3 (9–0) | Lloyd Noble Center (11,572); Norman, Oklahoma |
| 02/12/2011; 3:00 pm, ESPN | No. 3 | Baylor | W 69–60 | 22–3 (10–0) | Frank Erwin Center (16,734); Austin, TX |
| 02/16/2011; 8:00 pm, ESPN2 | No. 3 | Oklahoma State | W 73–55 | 23–3 (11–0) | Frank Erwin Center (15,333); Austin, TX |
| 02/19/2011; 12:45 pm, Big 12 Network | No. 3 | at Nebraska | L 67–70 | 23–4 (11–1) | Bob Devaney Sports Center (12,208); Lincoln, NE |
| 02/22/2011; 7:00 pm, Big 12 Network | No. 5 | Iowa State | W 76–53 | 24–4 (12–1) | Frank Erwin Center (14,933); Austin, TX |
| 02/26/2011; 3:00 pm, Big 12 Network | No. 5 | at Colorado | L 89–91 | 24–5 (12–2) | Coors Events Center (11,034); Boulder, CO |
| 02/28/2011; 8:00 pm, ESPN | No. 7 | Kansas State | L 70–75 | 24–6 (12–3) | Frank Erwin Center (16,734); Austin, TX |
| 03/03/2011; 8:00 pm, ESPN | No. 7 | at Baylor; ESPN College GameDay | W 60–54 | 25–6 (13–3) | Ferrell Center (10,627); Waco, TX |
Big 12 tournament
| 03/10/11; 6:00 pm, Big 12 Network | (2) No. 10 | vs. (10) Oklahoma; Big 12 Quarterfinals | W 74–54 | 26–6 | Sprint Center (18,910); Kansas City, MO |
| 03/11/11; 8:30 pm, Big 12 Network | (2) No. 10 | vs. (3) Texas A&M; Big 12 Semifinals | W 70–58 | 27–6 | Sprint Center (18,910); Kansas City, MO |
| 03/12/11; 5:00 pm, ESPN | (2) No. 10 | vs. (1) No. 2 Kansas; Big 12 Championship Game | L 73–85 | 27–7 | Sprint Center (18,940); Kansas City, MO |
NCAA tournament
| 03/18/11*; 11:15 am, CBS | (4 W) No. 8 | vs. (13 W) Oakland; NCAA Second Round | W 85–81 | 28–7 | BOK Center (12,631); Tulsa, OK |
| 03/20/11*; 6:10 pm, TNT | (4 W) No. 8 | vs. (5 W) No. 17 Arizona; NCAA Third Round | L 69–70 | 28–8 | BOK Center (15,839); Tulsa, OK |
*Non-conference game. ^{#}Rankings from AP Poll. (#) Tournament seedings in parentheses. All times are in Central Time.

== Rankings ==
Legend: ██ Increase in ranking. ██ Decrease in ranking.
| Poll | Pre | Wk 2 | Wk 3 | Wk 4 | Wk 5 | Wk 6 | Wk 7 | Wk 8 | Wk 9 | Wk 10 | Wk 11 | Wk 12 | Wk 13 | Wk 14 | Wk 15 | Wk 16 | Wk 17 | Wk 18 | Final |
|---|---|---|---|---|---|---|---|---|---|---|---|---|---|---|---|---|---|---|---|
| AP | | RV | 20 | 19 | 25 | 22 | 18 | 13 | 12 | 12 | 10 | 7 | 3 | 3 | 3 | 5 | 7 | 10 | 8 |
| Coaches | 25 | 22 | 21 | 20 | 25 | 25 | 22 | 14 | 12 | 14 | 11 | 8 | 3 | 3 | 2 | 5 | 7 | 10 | 16 |

== Roster ==
2010–11 Texas Longhorns men's basketball team
Players
Coaches

| Pos. | # | Name | Height | Weight | Year | Hometown |
|---|---|---|---|---|---|---|
| F | 1 | Gary Johnson | 6 ft 6 in (1.98 m) | 238 lb (108 kg) | Sr | Houston, Texas |
| G/F | 3 | Jordan Hamilton | 6 ft 7 in (2.01 m) | 220 lb (100 kg) | So | Compton, California |
| G | 4 | Dogus Balbay | 6 ft 1 in (1.85 m) | 175 lb (79 kg) | Sr | Istanbul, Turkey |
| G | 5 | Cory Joseph | 6 ft 3 in (1.91 m) | 185 lb (84 kg) | Fr | Toronto, Ontario |
| G | 10 | Jai Lucas | 5 ft 10 in (1.78 m) | 160 lb (73 kg) | Sr | Houston, Texas |
| G | 12 | Trent Morgan | 5 ft 9 in (1.75 m) | 155 lb (70 kg) | Fr | Midlothian, Texas |
| F | 13 | Tristan Thompson | 6 ft 8 in (2.03 m) | 225 lb (102 kg) | Fr | Brampton, Ontario |
| G | 14 | J'Covan Brown | 6 ft 1 in (1.85 m) | 195 lb (88 kg) | So | Port Arthur, Texas |
| F/C | 20 | Alexis Wangmene | 6 ft 7 in (2.01 m) | 240 lb (109 kg) | Jr | Maroua, Cameroon |
| F/C | 21 | Matt Hill | 6 ft 10 in (2.08 m) | 245 lb (111 kg) | Sr | Lincoln, Nebraska |
| G | 22 | Andrew Dick | 6 ft 2 in (1.88 m) | 180 lb (82 kg) | So | Sherman, Texas |
| G | 24 | Ian Madden | 6 ft 6 in (1.98 m) | 200 lb (91 kg) | Fr | Austin, Texas |
| G | 25 | Dean Melchionni | 6 ft 4 in (1.93 m) | 185 lb (84 kg) | So | Lancaster, Pennsylvania |
| F/C | 53 | Clint Chapman | 6 ft 10 in (2.08 m) | 239 lb (108 kg) | Sr | Canby, Oregon |

Head coach

- Rick Barnes (Lenoir–Rhyne)

Assistant coach(es)

- Rodney Terry (St. Edward's)
- Russell Springmann (Salisbury)
- Christopher Ogden (Texas)

Legend

- (C) Team captain
- (S) Suspended
- (I) Ineligible
- (W) Walk-on
- Injured
- Current redshirt

Roster
Last update: 2010-12-05
