= 2010–11 Iowa State Cyclones men's basketball team =

American college basketball season

2010–11 Iowa State Cyclones men's basketball
- Conference: Big 12 Conference
- Record: 16-16 (3-13 Big 12)
- Head coach: Fred Hoiberg (1st season)
- Assistant coaches: Bobby Lutz; T. J. Otzelberger (5th season); Elwyn McCroy; Cornell Mann
- Home arena: Hilton Coliseum

2010–11 Big 12 men's basketball standings
	Conf.				Overall
Team	W		L	PCT	W		L	PCT
No. 2 Kansas †	14	–	2	.875	35	–	3	.921
No. 8 Texas	13	–	3	.813	28	–	8	.778
No. 24 Texas A&M	10	–	6	.625	24	–	9	.727
No. 21 Kansas State	10	–	6	.625	23	–	11	.676
Colorado	8	–	8	.500	24	–	14	.632
Missouri	8	–	8	.500	23	–	11	.676
Baylor	7	–	9	.438	18	–	13	.581
Nebraska	7	–	9	.438	19	–	13	.594
Oklahoma State	6	–	10	.375	20	–	14	.588
Oklahoma	5	–	11	.313	14	–	18	.438
Texas Tech	5	–	11	.313	13	–	19	.406
Iowa State	3	–	13	.188	16	–	16	.500
† 2011 Big 12 Tournament winner Rankings from AP poll

The 2010–11 Iowa State Cyclones men's basketball team represented Iowa State University during the 2010–11 NCAA Division I men's basketball season. The Cyclones were coached by Fred Hoiberg in his first season and played their home games at Hilton Coliseum in Ames, Iowa. They competed in the Big 12 Conference.

== Previous season ==
The Cyclones finished with a record of 15–17 and 4–12 in Big 12 play to finish tied for 9th in the regular season conference standings. They lost to Texas in the first round of the Big 12 tournament.

On April 26, 2010, Greg McDermott announced his resignation as head coach at Iowa State to take the same position at Creighton.

On April 27, 2010, it was announced that former player Fred Hoiberg would take over as head coach. Hoiberg, a standout player in college, had a 10-year career in the NBA and had been an executive with the Minnesota Timberwolves before joining Iowa State.

=== Offseason departures ===
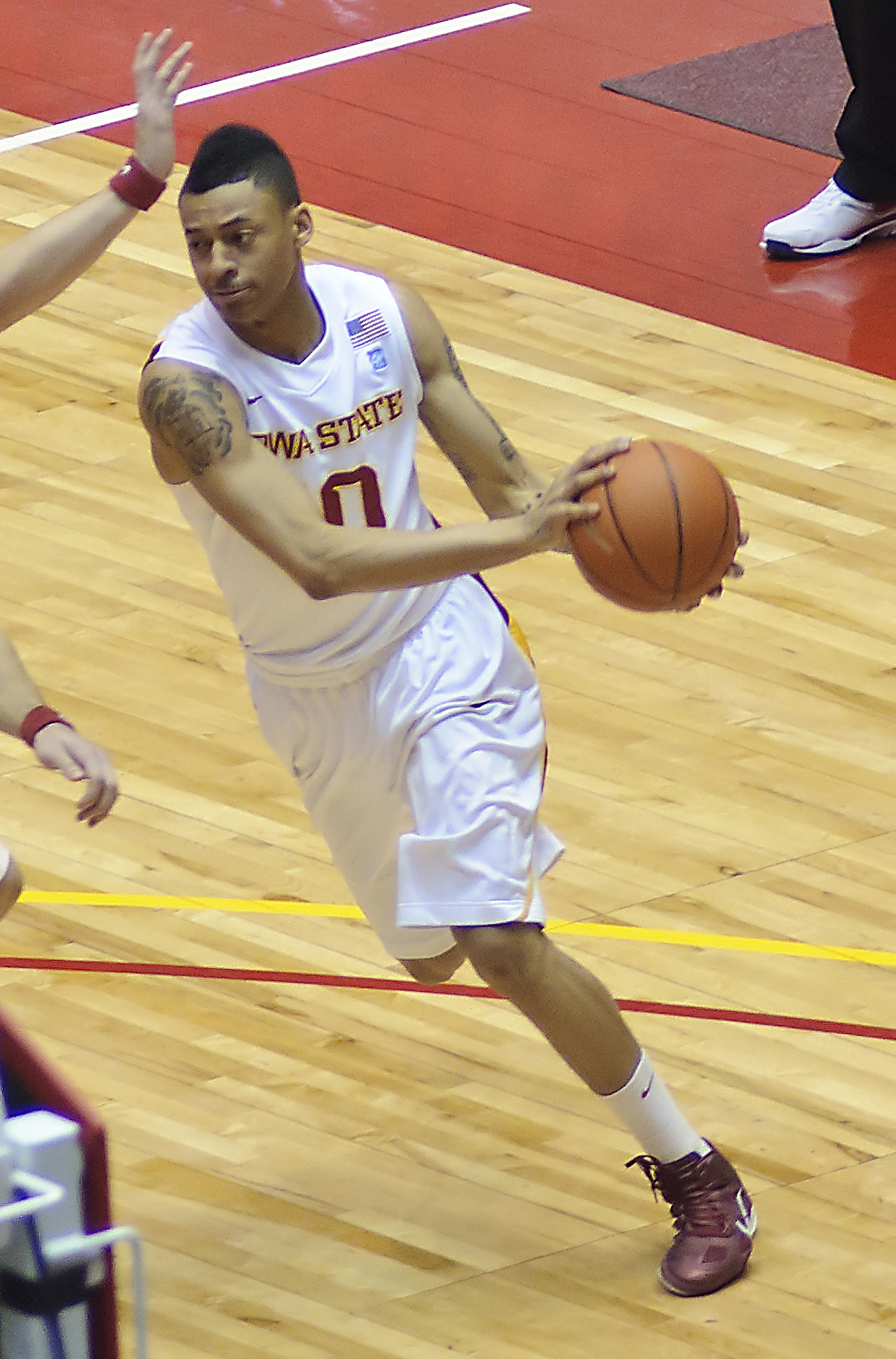
Diante Garrett, 2011

Offseason departures
Name	Position	Reason for departure
Craig Brackins	Forward	Declared for NBA draft
Lucca Staiger	Guard	Left team mid-season to play professionally
Dominique Buckley	Guard	Transferred to Toledo
Antwon Oliver	Guard	Transferred to Campbell
Charles Boozer	Guard	Transferred to Wichita State
Chris Colvin	Guard	Transferred to Palm Beach State
Alex Dorr	Forward	Transferred to University of Mary
LaRon Dendy	Forward	Transferred to Middle Tennessee
Justin Hamilton	Center	Transferred to LSU
Marquis Gilstrap	Forward	Graduated
L.A. Pomlee	Forward	Dismissed from team

== Recruiting ==
=== Prep recruits ===
College recruiting
Name	Hometown	School	Height	Weight	Commit date
Melvin Ejim; SF	Toronto	Brewster Academy	6 ft 6 in (1.98 m)	205 lb (93 kg)	Aug 24, 2009
Melvin Ejim; SF	Recruit ratings: Scout: Rivals: 247Sports: ESPN: (90)				
Eric McKnight; PF	Raleigh, North Carolina	Princeton Day	6 ft 9 in (2.06 m)	210 lb (95 kg)	Apr 26, 2010
Eric McKnight; PF	Recruit ratings: Scout: Rivals: 247Sports: ESPN: (91)				
Calvin Godfrey; PF	Milwaukee	Robbinsdale Cooper	6 ft 8 in (2.03 m)	240 lb (110 kg)	Apr 26, 2010
Calvin Godfrey; PF	Recruit ratings: Scout: Rivals: 247Sports: ESPN: (87)				
Jordan Railey; C	Beaverton, OR	Beaverton High	6 ft 10 in (2.08 m)	215 lb (98 kg)	Jan 8, 2010
Jordan Railey; C	Recruit ratings: Scout: Rivals: 247Sports: ESPN: (92)				
Overall recruit ranking: 247Sports: 70
Note: In many cases, Scout, Rivals, 247Sports, On3, and ESPN may conflict in their listings of height and weight.; In these cases, the average was taken. ESPN grades are on a 100-point scale.; Sources: "Iowa State 2010 Basketball Commitments". Rivals.; "2010 Iowa State Basketball Commits". Scout.; "ESPN". ESPN.; "Scout.com Team Recruiting Rankings". Scout.; "2010 Team Ranking". Rivals.

=== Incoming transfers ===
Incoming transfers
Name	Position	Hometown	Previous school	Remaining eligibility	Notes
DeMarcus Phillips	Guard	Milwaukee	Marshalltown CC	2	Phillips was eligible to play immediately.
Chris Babb	Guard	Arlington, Texas	Penn State	2	Babb sat out the 2010–11 season due to NCAA eligibility rules.
Chris Allen	Guard	Lawrenceville, GA	Michigan State	1	Allen sat out the 2010–11 season due to NCAA eligibility rules.
John Lamb	Guard	Indianola, Iowa	Morehead State	1	Lamb sat out the 2010–11 season due to NCAA eligibility rules.
Royce White	Forward	Minneapolis	Minnesota	3	White sat out the 2010–11 season due to NCAA eligibility rules.
Anthony Booker	Forward	Florissant, Missouri	Southern Illinois	2	Booker sat out the 2010–11 season due to NCAA eligibility rules.

== Roster ==
2010–11 Iowa State Cyclones men's basketball team
Players
Coaches

Pos.	#	Name	Height	Weight	Year	Previous school	Hometown
C	0	Jordan Railey	6 ft 11 in (2.11 m)	245 lb (111 kg)	Fr	Beaverton High	Beaverton, OR
G	1	Bubu Palo	6 ft 1 in (1.85 m)	175 lb (79 kg)	RS Fr	Ames High	Ames, Iowa
G	2	Chris Babb (redshirt)	6 ft 5 in (1.96 m)	220 lb (100 kg)	RS Jr	Penn State	Arlington, Texas
F	3	Melvin Ejim	6 ft 6 in (1.98 m)	215 lb (98 kg)	Fr	Brewster Academy	Toronto
G	4	Chris Allen (redshirt)	6 ft 3 in (1.91 m)	205 lb (93 kg)	RS Sr	Michigan State	Lawrenceville, GA
G	5	Jake Anderson	6 ft 2 in (1.88 m)	205 lb (93 kg)	RS Sr	Northern Illinois	Chicago
G	10	Diante Garrett (C)	6 ft 4 in (1.93 m)	180 lb (82 kg)	Sr	Vincent High	Milwaukee
G	11	Scott Christopherson	6 ft 3 in (1.91 m)	205 lb (93 kg)	RS Jr	Marquette	La Crosse, Wisconsin
F	13	Eric McKnight	6 ft 9 in (2.06 m)	220 lb (100 kg)	Fr	Princeton Day	Raleigh, North Carolina
F	15	Calvin Godfrey	6 ft 8 in (2.03 m)	230 lb (104 kg)	Fr	Robbinsdale Cooper	Milwaukee
F	22	Anthony Booker (redshirt)	6 ft 9 in (2.06 m)	245 lb (111 kg)	RS So	Southern Illinois	Florissant, Missouri
F	23	Jamie Vanderbeken	6 ft 11 in (2.11 m)	245 lb (111 kg)	RS Sr	Tyler JC	Belleville, ON
G	24	DeMarcus Phillips	6 ft 3 in (1.91 m)	195 lb (88 kg)	Jr	Marshalltown CC	Milwaukee
G	25	John Lamb (redshirt)	6 ft 1 in (1.85 m)	185 lb (84 kg)	RS Jr	Morehead State	Indianola, Iowa
F	30	Royce White (redshirt)	6 ft 8 in (2.03 m)	250 lb (113 kg)	RS Fr	Minnesota	Minneapolis
F	33	Drew Mitchell (W)	6 ft 3 in (1.91 m)	240 lb (109 kg)	RS Sr	Iowa Central CC	Fort Dodge, Iowa

Head coach

- Fred Hoiberg (Iowa State)

Assistant coach(es)

- T.J. Otzelberger (UW–Whitewater)
- Matt Abdelmassih (St. John's)
- Cornell Mann (Akron)

Legend

- (C) Team captain
- (S) Suspended
- (I) Ineligible
- (W) Walk-on
- Injured
- Current redshirt

== Schedule and results ==
Date time, TV	Rank^{#}	Opponent^{#}	Result	Record	Site (attendance) city, state
Exhibition
November 5, 2010*; 7:00 pm, CloneZone		Dubuque	W 100–50		Hilton Coliseum (12,678); Ames, Iowa
Regular season
November 12, 2010*; 7:00 pm, CloneZone		Northern Arizona; Global Sports Hy-Vee Challenge	W 78–64	1–0	Hilton Coliseum (12,886); Ames, Iowa
November 14, 2010*; 1:00 pm, Mediacom		Alabama State; Global Sports Hy-Vee Challenge	W 74–47	2–0	Hilton Coliseum (12,453); Ames, Iowa
November 17, 2010*; 7:00 pm, Mediacom		Drake	W 91–43	3–0	Hilton Coliseum (12,988); Ames, Iowa
November 21, 2010*; 2:00 pm		vs. Creighton; Global Sports Hy-Vee Challenge	W 91–88	4–0	Wells Fargo Arena (10,252); Des Moines, Iowa
November 24, 2010*; 7:00 pm, CloneZone		Kennesaw State; Global Sports Hy-Vee Challenge	W 91–51	5–0	Hilton Coliseum (11,237); Ames, Iowa
November 27, 2010*; 1:00 pm, Mediacom		Montana State	W 74–47	6–0	Hilton Coliseum (11,422); Ames, Iowa
December 1, 2010*; 7:00 pm, KWWL/KCWI		at Northern Iowa	L 54–60	6–1	McLeod Center (6,489); Cedar Falls, Iowa
December 4, 2010*; 1:00 pm, FSN		California; Big 12/Pac-10 Hardwood Series	L 73–76	6–2	Hilton Coliseum (13,284); Ames, Iowa
December 6, 2010*; 7:00 pm, Mediacom		Southeast Missouri State	W 85–58	7–2	Hilton Coliseum (12,502); Ames, Iowa
December 10, 2010*; 7:30 pm, BTN		at Iowa; Hy-Vee Cy-Hawk Series	W 75–72	8–2	Carver–Hawkeye Arena (13,276); Iowa City, Iowa
December 12, 2010*; 5:30 pm, Mediacom		Texas Southern	W 65–54	9–2	Hilton Coliseum (12,622); Ames, Iowa
December 19, 2010*; 7:30 pm, CloneZone		Dartmouth	W 71–42	10–2	Hilton Coliseum (12,403); Ames, Iowa
December 21, 2010*; 7:00 pm, Mediacom		Chicago State	W 104–63	11–2	Hilton Coliseum (11,477); Ames, Iowa
December 30, 2010*; 7:00 pm, CSNMA		at Virginia	W 60–47	12–2	John Paul Jones Arena (10,032); Charlottesville, Virginia
January 3, 2011*; 7:00 pm, Big 12 Network		Northern Illinois	W 72–63	13–2	Hilton Coliseum (11,469); Ames, Iowa
January 8, 2011; 8:00 pm, Big 12 Network		at Nebraska	L 62–63	13–3 (0-1)	Bob Devaney Center (11,610); Lincoln, Nebraska
January 12, 2011; 8:00 pm, ESPN2		No. 3 Kansas	L 79–84	13–4 (0-2)	Hilton Coliseum (12,204); Ames, Iowa
January 15, 2011; 8:00 pm, Big 12 Network		Baylor	W 72–57	14–4 (1-2)	Hilton Coliseum (11,734); Ames, Iowa
January 19, 2011; 8:00 pm, ESPNU		at No. 13 Missouri	L 54–87	14–5 (1-3)	Mizzou Arena (15,061); Columbia, Missouri
January 22, 2011; 8:00 pm, ESPNU		at Oklahoma State	L 87–96 ^{OT}	14–6 (1-4)	Gallagher-Iba Arena (9,922); Stillwater, Oklahoma
January 26, 2011; 8:00 pm, Big 12 Network		Texas Tech	L 83–92	14–7 (1-5)	Hilton Coliseum (10,823); Ames, Iowa
January 29, 2011; 8:00 pm, Big 12 Network		Oklahoma; Coaches vs. Cancer	L 76–82 ^{OT}	14–8 (1-6)	Hilton Coliseum (12,128); Ames, Iowa
February 1, 2011; 8:00 pm, FSNRM		at Colorado	L 69–95	14–9 (1-7)	Coors Events Center (6,764); Boulder, Colorado
February 5, 2011; 12:30 pm, Big 12 Network		Kansas State	L 85–86	14–10 (1-8)	Hilton Coliseum (12,411); Ames, Iowa
February 12, 2011; 3:00 pm, Big 12 Network		at No. 2 Kansas	L 66–89	14–11 (1-9)	Allen Fieldhouse (16,300); Lawrence, Kansas
February 16, 2011; 7:00 pm, Big 12 Network		at No. 21 Texas A&M	L 66–71	14–12 (1-10)	Reed Arena (7,041); College Station, Texas
February 19, 2011; 12:45 pm, Big 12 Network		No. 20 Missouri	L 66–71	14–13 (1-11)	Hilton Coliseum (12,691); Ames, Iowa
February 22, 2011; 7:00 pm, Big 12 Network		No. 5 Texas	L 53–76	14–14 (1-12)	Frank Erwin Center (14,933); Austin, Texas
February 26, 2011; 12:45 pm, Big 12 Network		Nebraska	W 83–82 ^{OT}	15–14 (2-12)	Hilton Coliseum (12,684); Ames, Iowa
March 2, 2011; 8:00 pm, Big 12 Network		Colorado	W 95–90	16–14 (3-12)	Hilton Coliseum (10,679); Ames, Iowa
March 5, 2011; 12:45 pm, Big 12 Network		at Kansas State	L 55–67	16–15 (3-13)	Bramlage Coliseum (12,528); Manhattan, Kansas
Big 12 tournament
March 9, 2011; 2:00 pm, Big 12 Network	(12)	vs. (5) Colorado; Big 12 First round	L 75–77	16–16 (3-13)	Sprint Center (18,910); Kansas City, Missouri
*Non-conference game. ^{#}Rankings from AP poll. (#) Tournament seedings in parentheses. All times are in Central Time.

== Rankings ==
Ranking movement Legend: ██ Increase in ranking. ██ Decrease in ranking. ██ Not ranked the previous week.
Poll	Pre	Wk 2	Wk 3	Wk 4	Wk 5	Wk 6	Wk 7	Wk 8	Wk 9	Wk 10	Wk 11	Wk 12	Wk 13	Wk 14	Wk 15	Wk 16	Wk 17	Wk 18	Post	Final
AP			RV	RV																*NA
Coaches																				

*AP does not release post-NCAA tournament rankings.

== Awards and honors ==
- All-Conference Selections

Diante Garrett (2nd Team)
Scott Christopherson (Honorable Mention)

- Ralph A. Olsen Award

Diante Garrett (2009)
