= 2010–11 Nebraska Cornhuskers men's basketball team =

American college basketball season

2010–11 Nebraska Cornhuskers men's basketball

NIT, First Round
- Conference: Big 12 Conference
- Record: 19–13 (7–9 Big 12)
- Head coach: Doc Sadler (5th season)
- Assistant coaches: Wes Flanigan; David Anwar; Jeremy Cox
- Home arena: Bob Devaney Sports Center

2010–11 Big 12 men's basketball standings
	Conf.				Overall
Team	W		L	PCT	W		L	PCT
No. 2 Kansas †	14	–	2	.875	35	–	3	.921
No. 8 Texas	13	–	3	.813	28	–	8	.778
No. 24 Texas A&M	10	–	6	.625	24	–	9	.727
No. 21 Kansas State	10	–	6	.625	23	–	11	.676
Colorado	8	–	8	.500	24	–	14	.632
Missouri	8	–	8	.500	23	–	11	.676
Baylor	7	–	9	.438	18	–	13	.581
Nebraska	7	–	9	.438	19	–	13	.594
Oklahoma State	6	–	10	.375	20	–	14	.588
Oklahoma	5	–	11	.313	14	–	18	.438
Texas Tech	5	–	11	.313	13	–	19	.406
Iowa State	3	–	13	.188	16	–	16	.500
† 2011 Big 12 Tournament winner Rankings from AP poll

The 2010–11 Nebraska Cornhuskers men's basketball team represented the University of Nebraska–Lincoln in the 2010–11 college basketball season. Head coach Doc Sadler was in his fifth season at Nebraska. The Cornhuskers competed in the Big 12 Conference and played their home games at the Bob Devaney Sports Center. They finished with a record of 19–13 overall, 7–9 in Big 12 Conference and lost in the first round of the 2011 Big 12 men's basketball tournament to Oklahoma State. They were invited to the 2011 National Invitation Tournament which they lost in the first round to Wichita State.

This was the Cornhuskers last season in the Big 12, as they moved to the Big Ten Conference in 2011–12.

== Roster ==
#	Name	Height	Weight (lbs.)	Position	Class	Hometown	Previous School
0	Toney McCray	6–6	210	G	Jr.	Missouri City, TX	Fort Bend Elkins HS
1	Eshaunte Jones	6–4	200	G	So.	Fort Wayne, IN	Hargrave Military Acad.
3	Brandon Richardson	6–0	190	G	Jr.	Los Angeles, CA	Hawthorne HS
5	Bo Spencer	6–2	193	G	Sr.	Baton Rouge, LA	LSU
10	Trevor Menke	5–11	172	G	Fr.	Beatrice, NE	Beatrice HS
12	Matt Karn	6–3	210	G	Sr.	Philpot, KY	Shawnee CC
13	Brandon Ubel	6–10	240	F	So.	Overland, KS	Blue Valley West HS
14	Christopher Niemann	6–11	275	C	RS So.	Kühlungsborn, GER	Erdgas Ehingen
15	Ray Gallegos	6–2	178	G	So.	Salt Lake City, UT	West Jordan HS
20	Jordan Tyrance	6–3	195	G	Fr.	Lincoln, NE	Lincoln Southwest HS
21	Brian Jordan Diaz	6–11	245	C	So.	Caguas, PR	Colegio Bautista de Caguas
25	Caleb Walker	6–4	205	G	Jr.	Hutchinson, KS	Butler CC
31	Drake Beranek	6–4	200	G	Sr.	Ravenna, NE	Nebraska-Kearney
32	Andre Almeida	6–11	310	C	Jr.	São Paulo, BRA	Arizona Western College
33	Mike Fox	6–4	195	G	So.	Beatrice, NE	Northwest Missouri State
34	Lance Jeter	6–3	225	G	Sr.	Beaver Falls, PA	Cincinnati
45	Kye Kurkowski	6–10	200	C	Fr.	Grant, NE	Perkins County HS
55	Marshall Parker	6–8	245	C	So.	Fort Smith, AR	Hendrix College

== Schedule and results ==
Date time, TV	Rank^{#}	Opponent^{#}	Result	Record	Site (attendance) city, state
Bahamas Exhibition Tour
8/17/2010*; 6:30 pm		at Y. Cares Wreckers	W 117–72	—	Kendal G.L. Isaacs National Gymnasium; Nassau, Bahamas
8/18/2010*; 6:30 pm		at Commonwealth Bank Giants	W 91–74	—	Kendal G.L. Isaacs National Gymnasium; Nassau, Bahamas
8/19/2010*; 6:30 pm		at Bahamas All-Stars Select	W 89–67	—	Kendal G.L. Isaacs National Gymnasium; Nassau, Bahamas
8/20/2010*; 6:30 pm		at Mail Boat Cybots	W 87–59	—	Kendal G.L. Isaacs National Gymnasium; Nassau, Bahamas
Exhibition
11/03/2010*; 6:30 pm		Peru State	W 75–43	—	Bob Devaney Sports Center (8,064); Lincoln, NE
11/08/2010*; 7:00 pm		Bellevue	W 82–58	—	Bob Devaney Sports Center (7,718); Lincoln, NE
Regular Season
11/12/2010*; 7:00 pm, FSMW		South Dakota	W 76–68	1–0	Bob Devaney Sports Center (8,528); Lincoln, NE
11/15/2010*; 7:00 pm		Arkansas–Pine Bluff	W 83–40	2–0	Bob Devaney Sports Center (7,716); Lincoln, NE
11/18/2010*; 12:25 pm, ESPNU		vs. Vanderbilt; Puerto Rico Tip-Off first round	L 49–59	2–1	José Miguel Agrelot Coliseum (4,018); San Juan, PR
11/19/2010*; 2:00 pm, ESPN3		vs. Davidson; Puerto Rico Tip-Off consolation round	L 67–70	2–2	José Miguel Agrelot Coliseum (10,127); San Juan, PR
11/21/2010*; 9:30 am, ESPNU		vs. Hofstra; Puerto Rico Tip-Off 7th place game	W 62–47	3–2	José Miguel Agrelot Coliseum (11,575); San Juan, PR
11/27/2010*; 5:00 pm, FSN		USC; Big 12/Pac-10 Hardwood Series	W 60–58	4–2	Bob Devaney Sports Center (8,756); Lincoln, NE
12/01/2010*; 7:00 pm		Jackson State	W 76–57	5–2	Bob Devaney Sports Center (4,668); Lincoln, NE
12/05/2010*; 1:00 pm, FSMW		Creighton; Rivalry	W 59–54	6–2	Bob Devaney Sports Center (9,824); Lincoln, NE
12/08/2010*; 7:00 pm		Alcorn State	W 78–57	7–2	Bob Devaney Sports Center (7,646); Lincoln, NE
12/11/2010*; 1:00 pm, FSMW		TCU	W 70–56	8–2	Bob Devaney Sports Center (8,057); Lincoln, NE
12/18/2010*; 6:00 pm		Eastern Washington	W 72–42	9–2	Bob Devaney Sports Center (7,434); Lincoln, NE
12/21/2010*; 7:00 pm		Grambling State	W 79–39	10–2	Bob Devaney Sports Center (7,555); Lincoln, NE
01/03/2011*; 7:00 pm		North Dakota	W 77–46	11–2	Bob Devaney Sports Center (7,579); Lincoln, NE
01/05/2011*; 7:00 pm		Savannah State	W 68–48	12–2	Bob Devaney Sports Center (5,171); Lincoln, NE
01/08/2011; 7:00 pm, FSMW		Iowa State	W 63–62	13–2 (1–0)	Bob Devaney Sports Center (11,610); Lincoln, NE
01/12/2011; 8:00 pm		at No. 15 Missouri	L 69–77	13–3 (1–1)	Mizzou Arena (11,358); Columbia, MO
01/15/2011; 1:00 pm, ESPNU		at No. 3 Kansas	L 60–63	13–4 (1–2)	Allen Fieldhouse (16,300); Lawrence, KS
01/18/2011; 6:00 pm, ESPN2		Colorado	W 79–67	14–4 (2–2)	Bob Devaney Sports Center (8,477); Lincoln, NE
01/22/2011; 6:30 pm, ESPN3		at Texas Tech	L 71–72	14–5 (2–3)	United Spirit Arena (8,783); Lubbock, TX
01/29/2011; 1:00 pm, ESPN3		No. 13 Texas A&M	W 57–48	15–5 (3–3)	Bob Devaney Sports Center (11,101); Lincoln, NE
02/02/2011; 7:00 pm, Big 12 Network		at Kansas State	L 53–69	15–6 (3–4)	Bramlage Coliseum (12,528); Manhattan, KS
02/05/2011; 7:00 pm, Big 12 Network		No. 2 Kansas	L 66–86	15–7 (3–5)	Bob Devaney Sports Center (13,602); Lincoln, NE
02/09/2011; 7:00 pm, Big 12 Network		at Baylor	L 70–74	15–8 (3–6)	Ferrell Center (6,058); Waco, TX
02/12/2011; 6:00 pm, FSMW		Oklahoma State	W 65–54	16–8 (4–6)	Bob Devaney Sports Center (9,547); Lincoln, NE
02/16/2011; 8:00 pm, ESPNU		at Oklahoma	W 59–58	17–8 (5–6)	Lloyd Noble Center (7,990); Norman, OK
02/19/2011; 12:45 pm, Big 12 Network		No. 3 Texas	W 70–67	18–8 (6–6)	Bob Devaney Sports Center (12,208); Lincoln, NE
02/23/2011; 8:00 pm, ESPNU		Kansas State	L 57–61	18–9 (6–7)	Bob Devaney Sports Center (12,178); Lincoln, NE
02/26/2011; 12:45 pm, Big 12 Network		at Iowa State	L 82–83 ^{OT}	18–10 (6–8)	Hilton Coliseum (12,684); Ames, IA
03/01/2011; 7:00 pm, Big 12 Network		No. 22 Missouri	W 69–58	19–10 (7–8)	Bob Devaney Sports Center (9,467); Lincoln, NE
03/05/2011; 8:00 pm		at Colorado	L 57–67	19–11 (7–9)	Coors Events Center (11,112); Boulder, CO
Big 12 tournament
03/09/2011; 11:30 am, Big 12 Network	(8)	vs. (9) Oklahoma State; Big 12 First Round	L 52–53	19–12	Sprint Center (18,910); Kansas City, MO
NIT
03/16/2011*; 6:00 pm, ESPN2	(5 VT)	at (4 VT) Wichita State; NIT First Round	L 49–76	19–13	Charles Koch Arena (7,336); Wichita, KS
*Non-conference game. ^{#}Rankings from AP Poll. (#) Tournament seedings in parentheses. VT=NIT Virginia Tech bracket. All times are in Central Time.
