= 2010–11 Texas Tech Red Raiders basketball team =

American college basketball season

2010–11 Texas Tech Red Raiders basketball
- Conference: Big 12
- Record: 13–19 (5–11 Big 12)
- Head coach: Pat Knight (3rd season)
- Assistant coaches: Chris Beard (10th season); Stew Robinson (8th season); Bubba Jennings (3rd season)
- Home arena: United Spirit Arena

2010–11 Big 12 men's basketball standings
	Conf.				Overall
Team	W		L	PCT	W		L	PCT
No. 2 Kansas †	14	–	2	.875	35	–	3	.921
No. 8 Texas	13	–	3	.813	28	–	8	.778
No. 24 Texas A&M	10	–	6	.625	24	–	9	.727
No. 21 Kansas State	10	–	6	.625	23	–	11	.676
Colorado	8	–	8	.500	24	–	14	.632
Missouri	8	–	8	.500	23	–	11	.676
Baylor	7	–	9	.438	18	–	13	.581
Nebraska	7	–	9	.438	19	–	13	.594
Oklahoma State	6	–	10	.375	20	–	14	.588
Oklahoma	5	–	11	.313	14	–	18	.438
Texas Tech	5	–	11	.313	13	–	19	.406
Iowa State	3	–	13	.188	16	–	16	.500
† 2011 Big 12 Tournament winner Rankings from AP poll

The 2010–11 Texas Tech Red Raiders men's basketball team represented Texas Tech University in the 2010-11 NCAA Division I men's basketball season. The Red Raiders' were led by Pat Knight in his third full season as the Red Raiders' thirteenth head coach. The team plays its home games at the United Spirit Arena in Lubbock, Texas and are members of the Big 12 Conference. They finished with 13–19, 5–11 in Big 12 play. They were eliminated by Missouri in the first round. They were not invited to a postseason tournament.

== Preseason ==
The Red Raiders were picked to finish 7th in conference play.

== Schedule ==
Date time, TV	Rank^{#}	Opponent^{#}	Result	Record	Site (attendance) city, state
Regular Season
11/12/10*; 7:00 pm		Louisiana–Monroe	W 86–67	1–0	United Spirit Arena (9,603); Lubbock, Texas
11/16/10*; 7:00 pm		at North Texas	L 83–92 ^{OT}	1–1	UNT Coliseum (7,105); Denton, Texas
11/19/10*; 7:00 pm		Stephen F. Austin	W 70–58	2–1	United Spirit Arena (9,208); Lubbock, Texas
11/21/10*; 1:00 pm		Liberty; South Padre Island Invitational	W 79–71	3–1	United Spirit Arena (8,856); Lubbock, Texas
11/23/10*; 7:30 pm		Georgia Southern; South Padre Island Invitational	W 103–79	4–1	United Spirit Arena (8,133); Lubbock, Texas
11/26/10*; 7:30 pm, FSN		at Saint Mary's; South Padre Island Invitational	L 68–88	4–2	South Padre Island Convention Centre (1,100); South Padre Island, Texas
11/27/10*; 4:30pm, FCS		at South Florida; South Padre Island Invitational	L 61–64	4–3	South Padre Island Convention Centre; South Padre Island, Texas
11/30/10*; 7:00 pm		Oral Roberts	W 86–82	5–3	United Spirit Arena (8,196); Lubbock, Texas
12/04/10*; 3:00 pm, FSN		at No. 23 Washington; Big 12/Pac-10 Hardwood Series	L 79–108	5–4	Alaska Airlines Arena (9,044); Seattle, Washington
12/08/10*; 7:00 pm		TCU	L 77–81	5–5	United Spirit Arena (9,113); Lubbock, Texas
12/18/10*; 8:00 pm		at UTEP Miners	L 71–82	5–6	Don Haskins Center (10,837); El Paso, Texas
12/22/10*; 7:00 pm		UT Arlington	W 73–56	6–6	United Spirit Arena (8,171); Lubbock, Texas
12/29/10*; 7:00 pm		New Mexico	L 60–61	6–7	United Spirit Arena (9,585); Lubbock, Texas
1/2/11*; 2:00 pm		Texas A&M–Corpus Christi	W 70–55	7–7	United Spirit Arena (6,431); Lubbock, Texas
1/4/11*; 7:00 pm		Delaware	W 79–60	8–7	United Spirit Arena (5,644); Lubbock, Texas
1/8/11; 1:00 pm, ESPNU		Baylor	L 59–71	8–8 (0–1)	United Spirit Arena (8,857); Lubbock, Texas
1/11/11; 6:00 pm, ESPN2		No. 12 Texas	L 52–83	8–9 (0–2)	United Spirit Arena (9,366); Lubbock, Texas
1/15/11; 12:30 pm, Big 12 Network		at No. 21 Kansas State	L 60–94	8–10 (0–3)	Bramlage Coliseum (12,528); Manhattan, Kansas
1/18/11; 7:00 pm, Big 12 Network		at Oklahoma	L 74–83	8–11 (0–4)	Lloyd Noble Center (9,240); Norman, Oklahoma
1/22/11; 6:30 pm		Nebraska	W 72–71	9–11 (1–4)	United Spirit Arena (8,783); Lubbock, Texas
1/26/11; 8:00 pm		at Iowa State	W 92–83	10–11 (2–4)	Hilton Coliseum (10,823); Ames, Iowa
1/29/11; 3:00 pm		Oklahoma State	W 75–74 ^{OT}	11–11 (3–4)	United Spirit Arena (9,022); Lubbock, Texas
2/1/11; 8:00 pm, ESPNU		No. 2 Kansas	L 66–88	11–12 (3–5)	United Spirit Arena (9,055); Lubbock, Texas
2/5/11; 8:00 pm, ESPNU		at No. 3 Texas	L 60–76	11–13 (3–6)	Frank Erwin Center (16,734); Austin, Texas
2/12/11; 8:00 pm, Big 12 Network		No. 22 Texas A&M	L 67–70	11–14 (3–7)	United Spirit Arena (9,091); Lubbock, Texas
2/15/11; 6:00 pm, ESPN2		at No. 20 Missouri	L 84–92	11–15 (3–8)	Mizzou Arena (10,488); Columbia, Missouri
2/19/11; 7:00 pm, Fox Sports Southwest		at Baylor	W 78–69	12–15 (4–8)	Ferrell Center (8,692); Waco, Texas
2/23/11; 6:30 pm		Colorado	L 68–71	12–16 (4–9)	United Spirit Arena (8,085); Lubbock, Texas
2/26/11; 12:30 pm, Big 12 Network		at Oklahoma State	L 68–70	12–17 (4–10)	Gallagher-Iba Arena (10,937); Stillwater, Oklahoma
3/2/11; 6:30 pm		Oklahoma	W 84–58	13–17 (5–10)	United Spirit Arena (8,032); Lubbock, Texas
3/5/11; 12:30 pm		at No. 24 Texas A&M	L 54–66	13–18 (5–11)	Reed Arena; College Station, Texas
Big 12 Tournament
3/9/11; 8:30 pm, Big 12 Network	(11)	vs. (6) Missouri; Big 12 First Round	L 84–88	13–19	Sprint Center; Kansas City, MO
*Non-conference game. ^{#}Rankings from AP Poll. (#) Tournament seedings in parentheses. All times are in Central Time.
