= 2010–11 Oklahoma Sooners men's basketball team =

American college basketball season

2010–11 Oklahoma Sooners men's basketball
- Conference: Big 12
- Record: 14-18 (5–11 Big 12)
- Head coach: Jeff Capel III
- Home arena: Lloyd Noble Center

2010–11 Big 12 men's basketball standings
	Conf.				Overall
Team	W		L	PCT	W		L	PCT
No. 2 Kansas †	14	–	2	.875	35	–	3	.921
No. 8 Texas	13	–	3	.813	28	–	8	.778
No. 24 Texas A&M	10	–	6	.625	24	–	9	.727
No. 21 Kansas State	10	–	6	.625	23	–	11	.676
Colorado	8	–	8	.500	24	–	14	.632
Missouri	8	–	8	.500	23	–	11	.676
Baylor	7	–	9	.438	18	–	13	.581
Nebraska	7	–	9	.438	19	–	13	.594
Oklahoma State	6	–	10	.375	20	–	14	.588
Oklahoma	5	–	11	.313	14	–	18	.438
Texas Tech	5	–	11	.313	13	–	19	.406
Iowa State	3	–	13	.188	16	–	16	.500
† 2011 Big 12 Tournament winner Rankings from AP poll

The 2010–11 Oklahoma Sooners basketball team represented the University of Oklahoma in the 2010–11 NCAA Division I men's basketball season. The Sooners were led by Jeff Capel III in his fifth season. The team played its home games at the Lloyd Noble Center in Norman, Oklahoma and were members of the Big 12 Conference.

== Preseason ==
=== Preseason Poll ===
The Sooners were picked to finish 11th in conference play.

=== Class of 2010 ===
College recruiting information
Name	Hometown	School	Height	Weight	Commit date
Abdul Ahmed; PF	Essex, England	Canarias Basketball Academy	6 ft 10 in (2.08 m)	207 lb (94 kg)	May 7, 2010
Abdul Ahmed; PF	Recruit ratings: Scout: Rivals: (86)				
Cameron Clark; SF	Sherman, Texas	Sherman High School	6 ft 7 in (2.01 m)	211 lb (96 kg)	Sep 21, 2009
Cameron Clark; SF	Recruit ratings: Scout: Rivals: (95)				
Calvin Newell; PG	Philadelphia, Pennsylvania	Evelyn Mack Academy	6 ft 1 in (1.85 m)	210 lb (95 kg)	Apr 29, 2010
Calvin Newell; PG	Recruit ratings: Scout: Rivals: (89)				
Tyler Neal; SF	Oklahoma City, Oklahoma	Putnman City West High School	6 ft 7 in (2.01 m)	234 lb (106 kg)	Mar 28, 2010
Tyler Neal; SF	Recruit ratings: Scout: Rivals: (87)				
Nick Thompson; PF	Clearfield, Texas	Carbon High School	6 ft 9 in (2.06 m)	212 lb (96 kg)	Apr 26, 2010
Nick Thompson; PF	Recruit ratings: Scout: Rivals: (JC)				
C.J. Washington; PF	Stringtown, Oklahoma	Connors State College	6 ft 7 in (2.01 m)	230 lb (100 kg)	May 7, 2010
C.J. Washington; PF	Recruit ratings: Scout: Rivals: (JC)				

== Roster ==
#	Name	Height	Weight (lbs.)	Position	Class	Hometown	Previous Team(s)
2	Steven Pledger	6'4"	219	G	So.	Chesapeake, Virginia, U.S.	Atlantic Shores Christian School
3	T. J. Franklin	5'11"	175	G	Jr.	Fort Worth, Texas, U.S.	North Crowley HS
4	Andrew Fitzgerald	6'8"	238	F	So.	Baltimore, Maryland, U.S.	Brewster Academy
5	C.J. Washington	6'7"	230	F	Jr.	Stringtown, Oklahoma, U.S.	Stringtown High School]
11	Calvin Newell	6'1"	210	G	Fr.	Philadelphia, Pennsylvania, U.S.	Evelyn Mack Academy; Strath Haven High School
12	Abdul Ahmed	6'10"	207	G	So.	London, England, U.K.	Canarias Academy; Thomas Tallis School
14	Carl Blair	6'2"	205	G	So.	Houston, Texas, U.S.	University of New Orleans; Bridgton Academy
15	Tyler Neal	6'7"	234	F	Fr.	Oklahoma City, Oklahoma, U.S.	Putnam City West HS
21	Cameron Clark	6'7"	211	G	Fr.	Sherman, Texas, U.S.	Sherman HS
22	Nick Thompson	6'9"	212	F	Jr.	Clearfield, Utah, U.S.	Clearfield High School
25	Kyle Hardick	6'8"	219	F	So.	Oklahoma City, OK, U.S.	Sierra College; Del Oro HS
31	Barry Honoré	6'7"	270	F	Jr.	Garland, Texas, U.S.	Putnam City HS
34	Cade Davis	6'5"	206	G	Sr.	Elk City, Oklahoma, U.S.	Elk City High School

== Schedule ==
Date time, TV	Rank^{#}	Opponent^{#}	Result	Record	Site (attendance) city, state
Regular Season
11/12/2010*		Coppin State	W 77–57	1–0	Lloyd Noble Center; Norman, OK
11/15/2010*; Sooner Sports Network		North Carolina Central	W 71–63 ^{OT}	2–0	Lloyd Noble Center; Norman, OK
11/18/2010*; Sooner Sports Network		Texas Southern	W 82–52	3–0	Lloyd Noble Center; Norman, OK
11/22/2010*; ESPN		vs. No. 8 Kentucky; Maui Invitational	L 64–76	3–1	Lahaina Civic Center; Lahaina, HI
11/23/2010*; ESPN2		vs. Virginia; Maui Invitational	L 56–74	3–2	Lahaina Civic Center; Lahaina, HI
11/24/2010*; ESPNU		at Chaminade; Maui Invitational 7th Place Game	L 64–68	3–3	Lahaina Civic Center; Lahaina, HI
12/01/2010*; Sooner Sports Network		at Arkansas	L 74–84	3–4	Bud Walton Arena; Fayetteville, AR
12/05/2010*; FSN		at Arizona	L 60–83	3–5	McKale Center; Tucson, AZ
12/09/2010*; Sooner Sports Network		Gardner–Webb	W 71–58	4–5	Lloyd Noble Center; Norman, OK
12/11/2010*; Sooner Sports Network		Oral Roberts	W 73–60	5–5	Lloyd Noble Center; Norman, OK
12/18/2010*; ESPN		vs. Cincinnati; All-College Classic	L 56–66	5–6	Ford Arena; Oklahoma City, OK
12/21/2010*; Sooner Sports Network		Sacramento State	W 66–53	6–6	Lloyd Noble Center; Norman, OK
12/30/2010*; Sooner Sports Network		Central Arkansas	W 76–73	7–6	Lloyd Noble Center; Norman, OK
01/03/2011*; Sooner Sports Network		Maryland Eastern Shore	W 73–49	8–6	Lloyd Noble Center; Norman, OK
01/08/2011; Big 12 Network		No. 16 Texas A&M	L 51–69	8–7 (0–1)	Lloyd Noble Center; Norman, OK
01/11/2011; Fox Sports Southwest		at Baylor	L 61–74	8–8 (0–2)	Ferrell Center; Waco, TX
01/15/2011; Big 12 Network		at No. 12 Texas	L 46–66	8–9 (0–3)	Frank Erwin Center; Austin, TX
01/18/2011; Big 12 Network		Texas Tech	W 83–74	9–9 (1–3)	Lloyd Noble Center; Norman, OK
01/22/2011; Big 12 Network		Colorado	W 67–60	10–9 (2–3)	Lloyd Noble Center; Norman, OK
01/29/2011		at Iowa State	W 82–76 ^{OT}	11–9 (3–3)	Hilton Coliseum; Ames, IA
02/02/2011		Baylor	W 73–66	12–9 (4–3)	Lloyd Noble Center; Norman, OK
02/05/2011; Big 12 Network		at Oklahoma State; Bedlam Series	L 75–81	12–10 (4–4)	Gallagher-Iba Arena; Stillwater, OK
02/09/2011; ESPN2		No. 8 Texas	L 52–68	12–11 (4–5)	Lloyd Noble Center; Norman, OK
02/12/2011; Big 12 Network		at No. 19 Missouri	L 61–84	12–12 (4–6)	Mizzou Arena; Columbia, MO
02/16/2011; ESPNU		Nebraska	L 58–59	12–13 (4–7)	Lloyd Noble Center; Norman, OK
02/19/2011; Big 12 Network		at Kansas State	L 62–77	12–14 (4–8)	Bramlage Coliseum; Manhattan, KS
02/23/2011; FSN Southwest		at No. 21 Texas A&M	L 47–61	12–15 (4–9)	Reed Arena; College Station, TX
02/26/2011; ESPN		No. 3 Kansas	L 70–82	12–16 (4–10)	Lloyd Noble Center; Norman, OK
03/02/2011; Sooner Sports Network		at Texas Tech	L 58–84	12–17 (4–11)	United Spirit Arena; Lubbock, TX
03/05/2011; Big 12 Network		Oklahoma State; Bedlam Series	W 64–61	13–17 (5–11)	Lloyd Noble Center; Norman, OK
Big 12 tournament
03/09/2011; Big 12 Network	(10)	vs. (7) Baylor; Big 12 First Round	W 84–67	14–17	Sprint Center; Kansas City, MO
03/10/2011; Big 12 Network	(10)	vs. (2) No. 10 Texas; Big 12 Quarterfinals	L 54–74	14–18	Sprint Center; Kansas City, MO
*Non-conference game. ^{#}Rankings from AP Poll. (#) Tournament seedings in parentheses. All times are in Central Time.

== Rankings ==
Ranking movement Legend: ██ Increase in ranking. ██ Decrease in ranking.
Poll	Pre	Wk 1	Wk 2	Wk 3	Wk 4	Wk 5	Wk 6	Wk 7	Wk 8	Wk 9	Wk 10	Wk 11	Wk 12	Wk 13	Wk 14	Wk 15	Wk 16	Wk 17	Wk 18	Final
AP	NR	NR	NR	NR	NR	NR	NR	NR	NR	NR	NR	NR	NR	NR	NR	NR	NR	NR	NR	NR
Coaches	NR	NR	NR	NR	NR	NR	NR	NR	NR	NR	NR	NR	NR	NR	NR	NR	NR	NR	NR	NR
