= 2010–11 Colorado Buffaloes men's basketball team =

American college basketball season

2010–11 Colorado Buffaloes men's basketball

NIT, Semi-finals
- Conference: Big 12 Conference
- Record: 24–14 (8–8 Big 12)
- Head coach: Tad Boyle
- Assistant coaches: Tom Abatemarco; Jean Prioleau; Mike Rohn
- Home arena: Coors Events Center

2010–11 Big 12 men's basketball standings
	Conf.				Overall
Team	W		L	PCT	W		L	PCT
No. 2 Kansas †	14	–	2	.875	35	–	3	.921
No. 8 Texas	13	–	3	.813	28	–	8	.778
No. 24 Texas A&M	10	–	6	.625	24	–	9	.727
No. 21 Kansas State	10	–	6	.625	23	–	11	.676
Colorado	8	–	8	.500	24	–	14	.632
Missouri	8	–	8	.500	23	–	11	.676
Baylor	7	–	9	.438	18	–	13	.581
Nebraska	7	–	9	.438	19	–	13	.594
Oklahoma State	6	–	10	.375	20	–	14	.588
Oklahoma	5	–	11	.313	14	–	18	.438
Texas Tech	5	–	11	.313	13	–	19	.406
Iowa State	3	–	13	.188	16	–	16	.500
† 2011 Big 12 Tournament winner Rankings from AP poll

The 2010–11 Colorado Buffaloes men's basketball team represented the University of Colorado in the 2010–11 NCAA Division I men's basketball season. Head coach Tad Boyle was in his first season at Colorado. The Buffaloes competed in the Big 12 Conference and played their home games at the Coors Events Center.

This was the Buffaloes' last season in the Big 12, as they moved to the Pac-12 Conference in 2011, before returning to the Big 12 in 2024.

== Preseason ==
The Buffaloes finished the previous season with a record of 15–16 and 6–10 in Big 12 Conference play. Of those 16 losses, seven were by six points or less. Additionally, all five starters return from that team.

In the Big 12 preseason coaches' poll, the Buffaloes were picked to finish ninth. Cory Higgins was named the Preseason All-Conference First Team, while Alec Burks was an honorable mention. Both were also named to the 50-man preseason Wooden Award watchlist. Additionally, Burks was on the 50-man preseason Naismith College Player of the Year watchlist. Gary Parrish picked them eighth in the Big 12, and said that he "won't be shocked if they ride the Higgins-Burks tandem into the top half of the league and make the NCAA tournament for the first time since 2003." Jason King of Rivals.com named the Buffaloes the sixth-best team in conference, adding, "Don't be surprised if long-suffering Colorado sneaks into the NCAA tournament."

== Roster ==
#	Name	Height	Weight (lbs.)	Position	Class	Hometown	Previous School
1	Nate Tomlinson	6 ft 3 in (1.91 m)	190 pounds (86 kg)	G	Jr.	Sydney	Lee Academy
2	Shannon Sharpe	6 ft 1 in (1.85 m)	200 pounds (91 kg)	G	Fr.	Corona, California	Centennial HS
5	Marcus Relphorde	6 ft 7 in (2.01 m)	220 pounds (100 kg)	F	Sr.	Chicago, Illinois	Saint Louis University
10	Alec Burks	6 ft 6 in (1.98 m)	185 pounds (84 kg)	G	So.	Grandview, Missouri	Grandview HS
11	Cory Higgins	6 ft 5 in (1.96 m)	190 pounds (86 kg)	G	Sr.	Danville, California	The Pendleton School
14	Javon Coney	6 ft 3 in (1.91 m)	210 pounds (95 kg)	C	Sr.	Chicago, Illinois	Latin HS
15	Shane Harris-Tunks	6 ft 11 in (2.11 m)	225 pounds (102 kg)	F/C	So.	Liverpool, New South Wales	Australian Institute of Sport
21	André Roberson	6 ft 7 in (2.01 m)	195 pounds (88 kg)	G	Fr.	San Antonio, Texas	Wagner HS
23	Sabatino Chen	6 ft 3 in (1.91 m)	180 pounds (82 kg)	G	Jr.	Louisville, Colorado	University of Denver
24	Levi Knutson	6 ft 4 in (1.93 m)	200 pounds (91 kg)	G	Sr.	Littleton, Colorado	Arapahoe HS
30	Carlon Brown	6 ft 5 in (1.96 m)	215 pounds (98 kg)	G	Sr.	Riverside, California	University of Utah
32	Ben Mills	7 ft 0 in (2.13 m)	215 pounds (98 kg)	C	Fr.	Hartland, Wisconsin	Arrowhead HS
33	Austin Dufault	6 ft 9 in (2.06 m)	230 pounds (100 kg)	F	Jr.	Killdeer, North Dakota	Killdeer HS
35	Hassan Safieddine	6 ft 7 in (2.01 m)	210 pounds (95 kg)	F	Fr.	Denver, Colorado	Flagler College
55	Trey Eckloff	6 ft 10 in (2.08 m)	235 pounds (107 kg)	F	Jr.	Englewood, Colorado	Cherry Creek HS

== 2010–11 Schedule and results ==
Date time, TV	Rank^{#}	Opponent^{#}	Result	Record	Site (attendance) city, state
Regular Season
November 12, 2010*; 8:00 pm, FSNRM		Idaho State	W 88–80	1–0	Coors Events Center (6,874); Boulder, CO
November 16, 2010*; 5:00 pm, FSNRM		at Georgia	L 74–83	1–1	Stegeman Coliseum (6,406); Athens, GA
November 20, 2010*; 8:00 pm		at San Francisco	L 81–83 ^{OT}	1–2	War Memorial Gymnasium (2,747); San Francisco, CA
November 23, 2010*; 7:00 pm, FSNRM		Alcorn State	W 91–51	2–2	Coors Events Center (2,778); Boulder, CO
November 28, 2010*; 11:00 am		at Harvard	L 66–82	2–3	Lavietes Pavilion (954); Cambridge, MA
November 30, 2010*; 7:00 pm, FSNRM		Texas–Pan American	W 83–64	3–3	Coors Events Center (2,641); Boulder, CO
December 4, 2010*; 8:00 pm, ESPNU		Oregon State; Big 12/Pac-10 Hardwood Series	W 83–57	4–3	Coors Events Center (6,406); Boulder, CO
December 8, 2010*; 8:00 pm, FSNRM		Colorado State	W 90–83 ^{OT}	5–3	Coors Events Center (7,219); Bouler, CO
December 17, 2010*; 7:30 pm, FSNRM		The Citadel; Las Vegas Classic	W 89–61	6–3	Coors Events Center (4,368); Boulder, CO
December 19, 2010*; 2:00 pm, FSNRM		Longwood; Las Vegas Classic	W 104–59	7–3	Coors Events Center (2,556); Boulder, CO
December 22, 2010*; 8:00 pm, CBSCS		vs. New Mexico; Las Vegas Classic semi-finals	L 76–89	7–4	Orleans Arena (2,867); Paradise, NV
December 23, 2010*; 5:30 pm, CBSCS		vs. Indiana; Las Vegas Classic 3rd place	W 78–69	8–4	Orleans Arena (NA); Paradise, NV
December 29, 2010*; 7:00 pm, FSNRM		Maryland Eastern Shore	W 92–65	9–4	Coors Events Center (3,896); Boulder, CO
January 2, 2011*; 6:00 pm		at Cal State Bakersfield	W 85–73	10–4	Rabobank Arena (1,464); Bakersfield, CA
January 5, 2011*; 7:00 pm		Western New Mexico	W 92–70	11–4	Coors Events Center (2,139); Boulder, CO
January 8, 2011; 11:30 am, Big 12 Network		No. 8 Missouri	W 89–76	12–4 (1–0)	Coors Events Center (8,694); Boulder, CO
January 12, 2011; 7:00 pm, ESPNU		at No. 20 Kansas State	W 74–66	13–4 (2–0)	Bramlage Coliseum (12,528); Manhattan, KS
January 15, 2011; 11:30 am, Big 12 Network		Oklahoma State	W 75–71	14–4 (3–0)	Coors Events Center (11,096); Boulder, CO
January 18, 2011; 5:00 pm, ESPN2		at Nebraska	L 67–79	14–5 (3–1)	Bob Devaney Sports Center (8,477); Lincoln, NE
January 22, 2011; 11:30 am, Big 12 Network		at Oklahoma	L 60–67	14–6 (3–2)	Lloyd Noble Center (9,158); Norman, OK
January 25, 2011; 6:00 pm, Big 12 Network		No. 6 Kansas	L 78–82	14–7 (3–3)	Coors Events Center (11,203); Boulder, CO
January 29, 2011; 11:30 am, Big 12 Network		at Baylor	L 66–70	14–8 (3–4)	Ferrell Center (6,095); Waco, TX
February 1, 2011; 7:00 pm, FSNRM		Iowa State	W 95–69	15–8 (4–4)	Coors Events Center (6,764); Boulder, CO
February 5, 2011; 5:30 pm		at No. 15 Missouri	L 73–89	15–9 (4–5)	Mizzou Arena (14,288); Columbia, MO
February 9, 2011; 7:00 pm, ESPNU		No. 22 Texas A&M	L 70–73 ^{OT}	15–10 (4–6)	Coors Events Center (7,517); Boulder, CO
February 12, 2010; 7:00 pm, ESPNU		Kansas State	W 58–56	16–10 (5–6)	Coors Events Center (11,052); Boulder, CO
February 19, 2011; 12:00 pm, ESPN		at No. 1 Kansas	L 63–89	16–11 (5–7)	Allen Fieldhouse (16,300); Lawrence, KS
February 23, 2011; 5:00 pm		at Texas Tech	W 71–68	17–11 (6–7)	United Spirit Arena (8,085); Lubbock, TX
February 26, 2011; 2:00 pm, Big 12 Network		No. 5 Texas	W 91–89	18–11 (7–7)	Coors Events Center (11,034); Boulder, CO
March 2, 2011; 5:30 pm		at Iowa State	L 90–95	18–12 (7–8)	Hilton Coliseum (12,679); Ames, IA
March 5, 2011; 7:00 pm		Nebraska	W 67–57	19–12 (8–8)	Coors Events Center (11,112); Boulder, CO
2011 Big 12 men's basketball tournament
March 9, 2011; 1:00 pm, Big 12 Network	(5)	vs. (12) Iowa State; First round	W 77–75	20–12	Sprint Center (18,910); Kansas City, MO
March 10, 2011; 1:00 pm, Big 12 Network	(5)	vs. (4) No. 23 Kansas State; Quarter-finals	W 87–75	21–12	Sprint Center (18,910); Kansas City, MO
March 11, 2011; 1:00 pm, Big 12 Network	(5)	vs. (1) No. 2 Kansas; Semi-finals	L 83–90	21–13	Sprint Center (18,910); Kansas City, MO
2011 NIT
March 16, 2011*; 7:30 pm, ESPN3	(1 C)	(8 C) Texas Southern; First round	W 88–74	22–13	Coors Events Center (6,299); Boulder, CO
March 18, 2011*; 7:00 pm, ESPNU	(1 C)	(4 C) California; Second round	W 89–72	23–13	Coors Events Center (7,614); Boulder, CO
March 22, 2011*; 7:00 pm, ESPN	(1 C)	(7 C) Kent State; Quarter-finals	W 81–74	24–13	Coors Events Center (9,065); Boulder, CO
March 29, 2011*; 7:00 pm, ESPN2	(1 C)	vs. (1 A) Alabama; Semi-finals	L 61–62	24–14	Madison Square Garden (6,082); New York, NY
*Non-conference game. ^{#}Rankings from Coaches' Poll. (#) Tournament seedings in parentheses. C=NIT Colorado bracket. A=NIT Alabama bracket. All times are in Mountain Time.

== Season ==
=== Preconference season ===
The Buffaloes defeated in-state rivals Colorado State 93–80 in overtime, behind Alec Burks' 25 points. Marcus Relphorde contributed 18 points and Cory Higgins added 15. Levi Knutson hit four free throws in the final 57 seconds to seal the victory.

=== Big 12 season ===
Snapping a losing streak of 13 consecutive conference openers, Colorado knocked off No. 8 Missouri 89–76 as Alec Burks exploded for a career-high 36 points. This was the Buffaloes' first win over a top ten team since defeating No. 3 Texas in 2003. Cory Higgins had 18 points and a career-tying 10 rebounds. The Buffaloes had a 12-point halftime lead and never let Missouri get closer than seven in the second half.

=== Post-season ===
The Buffs were selected as the No. 1 seed for the 2011 NIT Tournament.

== Rankings ==
Ranking movement Legend: ██ Increase in ranking. ██ Decrease in ranking.
Poll	Pre	Wk 1	Wk 2	Wk 3	Wk 4	Wk 5	Wk 6	Wk 7	Wk 8	Wk 9	Wk 10	Wk 11	Wk 12	Wk 13	Wk 14	Wk 15	Wk 16	Wk 17	Wk 18	Final
AP		RV	NR							RV	NR									
Coaches										RV	NR									

== Awards and honors ==
Alec Burks

- Preseason All-Big 12 Honorable Mention
- Preseason John R. Wooden Award Watchlist
- Preseason Naismith College Player of the Year Watchlist

Cory Higgins

- Preseason All-Big 12 First Team
- Preseason John R. Wooden Award Watchlist
