= 2011 Big 12 men's basketball tournament =

- Classification: Division I
- Season: 2010–11
- Teams: 12
- Site: Sprint Center; Kansas City, Missouri
- Champions: Kansas (8th title)
- Winning coach: Bill Self (5th title)
- MVP: Marcus Morris (Kansas)
- Attendance: 113,490 (overall); 18,940 (championship)
- Top scorer: Alec Burks (Colorado) (76 points)
- Television: ESPN, Big 12 Network, ESPN2

2010–11 Big 12 men's basketball standings
	Conf.				Overall
Team	W		L	PCT	W		L	PCT
No. 2 Kansas †	14	–	2	.875	35	–	3	.921
No. 8 Texas	13	–	3	.813	28	–	8	.778
No. 24 Texas A&M	10	–	6	.625	24	–	9	.727
No. 21 Kansas State	10	–	6	.625	23	–	11	.676
Colorado	8	–	8	.500	24	–	14	.632
Missouri	8	–	8	.500	23	–	11	.676
Baylor	7	–	9	.438	18	–	13	.581
Nebraska	7	–	9	.438	19	–	13	.594
Oklahoma State	6	–	10	.375	20	–	14	.588
Oklahoma	5	–	11	.313	14	–	18	.438
Texas Tech	5	–	11	.313	13	–	19	.406
Iowa State	3	–	13	.188	16	–	16	.500
† 2011 Big 12 Tournament winner Rankings from AP poll

The 2011 Phillips 66 Big 12 Men's Basketball Championship was the 2011 edition of the Big 12 Conference's championship tournament held at the Sprint Center in Kansas City, Missouri from March 9 until March 12, 2011. It was won by top-seeded Kansas.

== Seeding ==
The Tournament consisted of a 12 team single-elimination tournament with the top 4 seeds receiving a bye.

2011 Big 12 Men's Basketball Tournament seeds
Seed	School	Conf.	Over.	Tiebreaker
1	Kansas ‡#	14–2	35–3	
2	Texas #	13–3	28–8	
3	Texas A&M #	10–6	24–9	1–0 vs. KSU
4	Kansas State #	10–6	23–11	0–1 vs.TAMU
5	Colorado	8–8	24–14	1–1 vs. MU, 5–5 vs. division, 0–2 vs. KU, 2–0 vs. KSU
6	Missouri	8–8	23–11	1–1 vs. CU, 5–5 vs. division, 0–2 vs. KU, 1–1 vs. KSU
7	Baylor	7–9	18–13	1–0 vs. NU
8	Nebraska	7–9	19–13	0–1 vs. BU
9	Oklahoma State	6–10	20–14	
10	Oklahoma	5–11	14–18	1–1 vs. TT, 3–7 vs. division, 0–2 vs. UT, 0–2 vs. TAMU, 1–1 vs. BU, 1–1 vs. OSU, 0–1 vs. KU, 0–1 vs. KSU, 1–1 vs. CU/MU
11	Texas Tech	5–11	13–19	1–1 vs. OU, 3–7 vs. division, 0–2 vs. UT, 0–2 vs. TAMU, 1–1 vs. BU, 1–1 vs. OSU, 0–1 vs. KU, 0–1 vs. KSU, 0–2 vs. CU/MU
12	Iowa State	3–13	16–16	
‡ – Big 12 Conference regular season champions, and tournament No. 1 seed. # – Received a single-bye in the conference tournament. Overall records include all games played in the Big 12 Conference tournament.

== Schedule ==
Session	Game	Time	Matchup	Television	Attendance
First Round – Wednesday, March 9
1	1	11:30 am	#9 Oklahoma State 53 vs #8 Nebraska 52	Big 12 Network	18,910
1	2	2:00 pm	#5 Colorado 77 vs #12 Iowa State 75	Big 12 Network	18,910
2	3	6:00 pm	#10 Oklahoma 84 vs #7 Baylor 67	Big 12 Network	18,910
2	4	8:30 pm	#6 Missouri 88 vs #11 Texas Tech 84	Big 12 Network	18,910
Quarterfinals – Thursday, March 10
3	5	11:30 am	#1 Kansas 63 vs #9 Oklahoma State 62	ESPN2	18,910
3	6	2:00 pm	#5 Colorado 87 vs #4 Kansas State 75	Big 12 Network	18,910
4	7	6:00 pm	#2 Texas 74 vs #10 Oklahoma 54	Big 12 Network	18,910
4	8	8:30 pm	#3 Texas A&M 86 vs #6 Missouri 71	ESPN2	18,910
Semifinals – Friday, March 11
5	9	6:00 pm	#1 Kansas 90 vs #5 Colorado 83	Big 12 Network	18,910
5	10	8:30 pm	#2 Texas 70 vs #3 Texas A&M 58	Big 12 Network	18,910
Final – Saturday, March 12
6	11	5:00 pm	#1 Kansas 85 vs #2 Texas 73	ESPN	18,940
Game times in CT. #-Rankings denote tournament seed

== Tournament bracket ==
First round March 9
8	Nebraska	52
9	Oklahoma State	53
5	Colorado	77
12	Iowa State	75
7	Baylor	67
10	Oklahoma	84
6	Missouri	88
11	Texas Tech	84

Second round March 10
1	Kansas (#2)	63
9	Oklahoma State	62
4	Kansas State (#19)	75
5	Colorado	87
2	Texas (#10)	74
10	Oklahoma	54
3	Texas A&M	86
6	Missouri	71

Semifinals; March 11
1	Kansas (#2)	90
5	Colorado	83
2	Texas (#10)	70
3	Texas A&M	58

Championship Game; March 12
1	Kansas (#2)	85
2	Texas (#10)	73

Asterisk denotes game ended in overtime. Rankings reflect AP Poll for week of 3/7/2011.

== All-Tournament Team ==
Most Outstanding Player – Marcus Morris, Kansas

Player	Team	Position	Class
Marcus Morris	Kansas	Jr.	F
Markieff Morris	Kansas	Jr.	F
Jordan Hamilton	Texas	So.	F/G
Tristan Thompson	Texas	Fr.	F
Alec Burks	Colorado	So.	G

== See also ==
- 2011 Big 12 Conference women's basketball tournament
- 2011 NCAA Division I men's basketball tournament
- 2010–11 NCAA Division I men's basketball rankings
