= Dalonte Hill =

American basketball coach (born 1979)

Current position
- Title: Assistant coach
- Team: Tennessee State
- Conference: OVC

Playing career
- 1997–2000: Charlotte
- 2000–2001: Bowie State

Coaching career (HC unless noted)
- 2003–2005: Charlotte (assistant)
- 2006–2011: Kansas State (assistant)
- 2011–2013: Maryland (assistant)
- 2017–2019: Austin Peay (assistant)
- 2019–2021: Southern Miss (assistant)
- 2021–2022: Stephen F. Austin (assistant)
- 2024–2025: Chicago State (assistant)
- 2025–present: Tennessee State (assistant)

Dalonte Hill (born January 19, 1979) is an American basketball coach. He is currently an assistant coach at Chicago State. He was previously an assistant coach at Stephen F. Austin. Prior to SFA, he was an assistant college basketball coach at The University of Maryland. He was hired to join head coach Mark Turgeon's staff in May 2011.

Prior to his hiring at Maryland, Hill served as an assistant under Kansas State head coach Frank Martin. In August 2010, Kansas State athletic director John Currie extended Hill's contract through 2015 and increased his salary to $423,750. His previous contract, worth $420,000 a year, had made him the highest paid assistant coach in college basketball. In addition, Hill was eligible for a bonus of $80,000 based on the success of his team.

Hill, a Washington, D.C. native, coached the AAU team DC Assault for two years prior to being hired at Charlotte, where he was an assistant coach from 2003 to 2005.

Hill has had two run in's with the law, both times being arrested on suspicion of DUI. One of the arrests came while Hill was in Kansas and the other while he was at Maryland.

On November 27, 2013, Hill resigned as assistant coach for the Terps, effective immediately.

About 3 1/2 years after resigning from Maryland, Hill was hired as assistant coach at Austin Peay under new head coach Matt Figger in May 2017.
