= 2010–11 Atlantic 10 Conference men's basketball season =

- League: NCAA Division I
- Sport: Basketball
- Teams: 14
- TV partner: CBS College Sports Network

Regular Season
- Champions: Xavier
- Season MVP: Tu Holloway (Xavier)

Tournament
- Champions: Richmond
- Runners-up: Dayton
- Finals MVP: Kevin Anderson (Richmond)

Basketball seasons
- 09–10 11–12

2010–11 Atlantic 10 men's basketball standings
	Conf.				Overall
Team	W		L	PCT	W		L	PCT
No. 20 Xavier	15	–	1	.938	24	–	8	.750
Temple	14	–	2	.875	26	–	8	.765
Richmond †	13	–	3	.813	29	–	8	.784
Duquesne	10	–	6	.625	19	–	13	.594
George Washington	10	–	6	.625	17	–	14	.548
Rhode Island	9	–	7	.563	20	–	14	.588
St. Bonaventure	8	–	8	.500	16	–	15	.516
Dayton	7	–	9	.438	22	–	14	.611
UMass	7	–	9	.438	15	–	15	.500
La Salle	6	–	10	.375	15	–	18	.455
Saint Louis	6	–	10	.375	12	–	19	.387
Saint Joseph's	4	–	12	.250	11	–	22	.333
Charlotte	2	–	14	.125	10	–	20	.333
Fordham	1	–	15	.063	7	–	21	.250
† 2011 Atlantic 10 Tournament winner As of March 25, 2011; Rankings from AP Poll

The 2010–11 Atlantic 10 Conference men's basketball season marked the 35th season of Atlantic 10 Conference basketball. The 2011 Atlantic 10 men's basketball tournament was held for the fifth straight year at Boardwalk Hall in Atlantic City, New Jersey.

== Preseason ==
In the 2010 preseason, two new head coaches filled vacant Atlantic 10 positions. Fordham fired Dereck Whittenburg on December 3, 2009, and interim coach Jared Grasso was hired in Whittenburg's absence. The Rams finished the year 2–26, and Grasso was not retained. On March 25, 2010, Tom Pecora was hired from Hofstra, where he coached seven years to a 155–126 record. The Charlotte 49ers fired coach Bobby Lutz on March 15, despite being the team's all-time wins leader with a record of 218–158. In his final season, he led the team to a 19–12 mark but suffered a late season collapse and did not make the NCAA tournament or NIT. He was replaced by Alan Major, an assistant coach at Ohio State for six years, on April 9.

Atlantic 10 media day was held on October 21, 2010. Temple was picked to win their fourth straight A-10 championship by coaches and the media. They received 19 first-place votes, and Xavier and Richmond received three first-place votes each, while Dayton was picked first on one ballot. Richmond's Kevin Anderson was the reigning player of the year, having won the honor in the 2009–10 Atlantic 10 Conference men's basketball season.

=== Atlantic 10 preseason poll ===
Rank	Team	Votes
1	Temple	350
2	Xavier	325
3	Richmond	311
4	Dayton	310
5	Rhode Island	233
6	Saint Louis	223
7	Charlotte	218
8	Duquesne	172
9	La Salle	133
10	George Washington	130
11	Massachusetts	126
12	Saint Joseph's	91
13	St. Bonaventure	80
14	Fordham	28

=== Atlantic 10 preseason teams ===
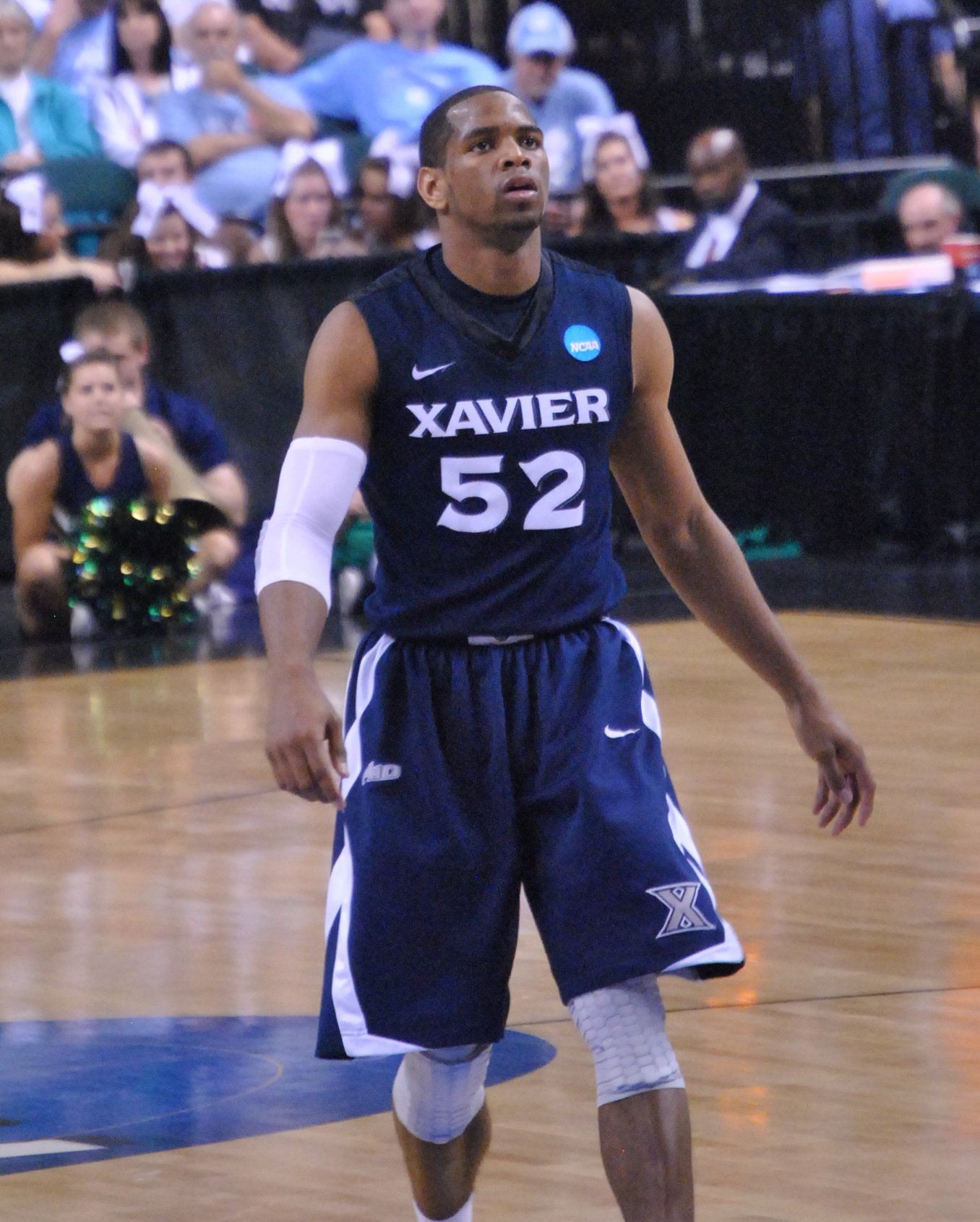
Tu Holloway

Award	Recipients
First Team	Lavoy Allen (Temple); Kevin Anderson (Richmond); Andrew Nicholson (St. Bonaventure); Damian Saunders (Duquesne); Chris Wright (Dayton)
Second Team	Juan Fernandez (Temple); Chris Gaston (Fordham); Tu Holloway (Xavier); Delroy James (Rhode Island); Shamari Spears (Charlotte)
Third Team	Chris Braswell (Charlotte); Cody Ellis (Saint Louis); Chris Johnson (Dayton); Lasan Kromah (George Washington); Aaric Murray (La Salle)
Defensive Team	Lavoy Allen (Temple); Kevin Anderson (Richmond); Dante Jackson (Xavier); Andrew Nicholson (St. Bonaventure); Damian Saunders (Duquesne)
Rookie Team	C. J. Aiken (Saint Joseph's); Langston Galloway (Saint Joseph's); Jordan Latham (Xavier); Rob Loe (Saint Louis); Juwan Staten (Dayton)

=== Preseason watchlists ===
On October 4, 2010, the Wooden Award preseason watch list was released, including three Atlantic 10 players. The watchlist was composed of 50 players who were not transfers, freshmen or medical redshirts. The list will be reduced to a 30-player mid-season watchlist in December and a final national ballot of about 20 players in March. The Naismith College Player of the Year watchlist of 50 players was announced on November 16, 2010. In late February, a shorter list of the top 30 players was compiled to prepare for a March vote to narrow the list to four finalists.

	Wooden	Naismith
Lavoy Allen (Temple)	✓	✓
Kevin Anderson (Richmond)	✓	✓
Chris Wright (Dayton)	✓	✓

== Rankings ==
Legend
	Improvement in ranking
	Drop in ranking
	No change in ranking
RV	Received votes but were not ranked in Top 25 of poll

		Pre	Wk 1	Wk 2	Wk 3	Wk 4	Wk 5	Wk 6	Wk 7	Wk 8	Wk 9	Wk 10	Wk 11	Wk 12	Wk 13	Wk 14	Wk 15	Wk 16	Wk 17	Wk 18	Final
Charlotte	AP																				
Charlotte	C																				
Dayton	AP	RV																			
Dayton	C	RV	RV	RV																	
Duquesne	AP												RV	RV	RV						
Duquesne	C													RV							
Fordham	AP																				
Fordham	C																				
George Washington	AP																				
George Washington	C																				
La Salle	AP																				
La Salle	C																				
Massachusetts	AP																				
Massachusetts	C																				
Rhode Island	AP																				
Rhode Island	C																				
Richmond	AP	RV	RV	RV	RV	RV	RV				RV										
Richmond	C	RV	RV	RV	RV	RV	RV	RV													
Saint Joseph's	AP																				
Saint Joseph's	C																				
Saint Louis	AP																				
Saint Louis	C																				
St. Bonaventure	AP																				
St. Bonaventure	C																				
Temple	AP	22	21	21		RV	RV	RV	25	RV	19	RV	RV	RV	24	23	24	RV	24		
Temple	C	22	20	20	RV	RV	RV	RV	RV	RV	23	RV	RV	RV	RV	25	24	RV	25		
Xavier	AP	RV		RV									RV	RV	RV	24	25	23	18		
Xavier	C	RV	RV	RV									RV	RV	RV	RV	RV	RV	20		

== Conference awards & honors ==
=== Weekly honors ===
Throughout the conference regular season, the Atlantic 10 offices name a player of the week and rookie of the week each Monday.

Week	Player of the week	Rookie of the week
November 15, 2010	Tu Holloway (Xavier)	Tyreek Duren (La Salle)
November 22, 2010	Tu Holloway (Xavier)	Juwan Staten (Dayton)
November 29, 2010	Kevin Anderson (Richmond)	Langston Galloway (Saint Joseph's)
December 6, 2010	Ogo Adegboye (St. Bonaventure); Lavoy Allen (Temple)	Tyreek Duren (La Salle); Juwan Staten (Dayton)
December 13, 2010	Brenton Butler (Fordham)	T. J. McConnell (Duquesne)
December 20, 2010	Tu Holloway (Xavier); Andrew Nicholson (St. Bonaventure)	Nemanja Mikic (George Washington)
December 27, 2010	Akeem Richmond (Rhode Island)	Branden Frazier (Fordham); Juwan Staten (Dayton)
January 3, 2011	Javarris Barnett (Charlotte); Chris Wright (Dayton)	Tyreek Duren (La Salle)
January 10, 2011	Justin Harper (Richmond)	T. J. McConnell (Duquesne)
January 17, 2011	Orion Outerbridge (Rhode Island)	T. J. McConnell (Duquesne); Juwan Staten (Dayton)
January 24, 2011	Tu Holloway (Xavier)	T. J. McConnell (Duquesne); Matthew Wright (St. Bonaventure)
January 31, 2011	Tu Holloway (Xavier)	T. J. McConnell (Duquesne)
February 7, 2011	Scootie Randall (Temple)	Langston Galloway (Saint Joseph's)
February 14, 2011	Justin Harper (Richmond)	Langston Galloway (Saint Joseph's)
February 21, 2011	Tu Holloway (Xavier)	Dwayne Evans (Saint Louis)
February 29, 2011	Lavoy Allen (Temple)	Langston Galloway (Saint Joseph's)
March 6, 2011	Lavoy Allen (Temple)	Langston Galloway (Saint Joseph's)

=== Atlantic 10 All-Conference teams ===
Award	Recipients
First Team	Lavoy Allen (Temple); Kevin Anderson (Richmond); Justin Harper (Richmond); Tu Holloway (Xavier); Andrew Nicholson (St. Bonaventure)
Second Team	Bill Clark (Duquesne); Delroy James (Rhode Island); Ramone Moore (Temple); Damian Saunders (Duquesne); Tony Taylor (George Washington)
Third Team	Juan Fernandez (Temple); Anthony Gurley (Massachusetts); Mark Lyons (Xavier); Jamel McLean (Xavier); Chris Wright (Dayton)
Honorable Mention	Kenny Frease (Xavier); Chris Gaston (Fordham); Chris Johnson (Dayton); Scootie Randall (Temple)
Defensive Team	Lavoy Allen (Temple); Tu Holloway (Xavier); Marquis Jones (Rhode Island); Damian Saunders (Duquesne); Kevin Smith (Richmond)
Rookie Team	Tyreek Duren (La Salle); Dwayne Evans (Saint Louis); Langston Galloway (Saint Joseph's); T. J. McConnell (Duquesne); Juwan Staten (Dayton)
Academic Team	Brian Conklin (Saint Louis); Paul Eckerle (Saint Louis); Juan Fernandez (Temple); Will Martell (Rhode Island); Steve Weingarten (La Salle)
Player of the Year	Tu Holloway (Xavier)
Rookie of the Year	T. J. McConnell (Duquesne)
Defensive Player of the Year	Damian Saunders (Duquesne)
Chris Daniels Most Improved Player of the Year	Scootie Randall (Temple)
Sixth Man of the Year	Khalif Wyatt (Temple)
Student-Athlete of the Year	Steve Weingarten (La Salle)
Coach of the Year	Chris Mack (Xavier)

=== NABC ===
The National Association of Basketball Coaches announced their Division I AllDistrict teams on March 9 to recognize the best men's collegiate basketball student-athletes in the United States. Selected and voted on by member coaches of the NABC, 245 student-athletes were chosen from 24 districts. The selections on this list were then eligible for the State Farm Coaches' Division I All-America teams. The following list represented the Atlantic 10 players chosen to the list. Since District 4 comprised only Atlantic 10 Conference schools, this is equivalent to being named All-Atlantic 10 by the NABC.

First Team

- Kevin Anderson (Richmond)
- Bill Clark (Duquesne)
- Justin Harper (Richmond)
- Tu Holloway (Xavier)
- Andrew Nicholson (St. Bonaventure)

Second Team

- Anthony Gurley (Massachusetts)
- Delroy James (Rhode Island)
- Ramone Moore (Temple)
- Damian Saunders (Duquesne)
- Chris Wright (Dayton)

=== USBWA ===
On March 10, the U.S. Basketball Writers Association released its 2010–11 Men's All-District Teams, based on voting from its national membership. There were nine regions from coast to coast, and a player and coach of the year were selected in each. The following lists all the Atlantic 10 representatives selected within their respective regions.

District I (ME, VT, NH, RI, MA, CT)

- Delroy James (Rhode Island)

District II (NY, NJ, DE, DC, PA, WV)

- Andrew Nicholson (St. Bonaventure)

District III (VA, NC, SC, MD)
None Selected

District V (OH, IN, IL, MI, MN, WI)

- Tu Holloway (Xavier)

District VI (IA, MO, KS, OK, NE, ND, SD)
None Selected

== Postseason ==
=== NCAA tournament ===
Team	Bid Type	Seed	Results
Xavier	At-large	6	Lost vs. #11 Marquette 66–55
Temple	At-large	7	Won vs. #10 Penn State 66–64; Lost vs. #2 San Diego State 71–64
Richmond	Automatic	12	Won vs. #5 Vanderbilt 69–66; Won vs. #13 Morehead State 65–48; Lost vs. #1 Kansas 77–57

=== National Invitation tournament ===
Team	Bid Type	Seed	Results
Dayton	At-large	3	Lost vs. #6 College of Charleston 94–84

== 2011 NBA draft ==
Two Atlantic 10 players were selected in the 2011 NBA draft on June 23, both in the second round: Justin Harper and Lavoy Allen. Harper was selected with the 32nd pick by the Cleveland Cavaliers and subsequently traded to the Orlando Magic. With the 50th pick of the draft, the Philadelphia 76ers took Lavoy Allen. Tu Holloway declared for early entry in the draft but did not hire an agent and withdrew his name prior to the May 8 deadline.
