= 2010–11 Xavier Musketeers men's basketball team =

American college basketball season

2010–11 Xavier Musketeers men's basketball

Atlantic 10 regular season champions

NCAA tournament, Round of 64
- Conference: Atlantic 10 Conference

Ranking
- AP: No. 20
- Record: 24–8 (15–1 A-10)
- Head coach: Chris Mack (2nd season)
- Assistant coaches: Pat Kelsey; Orlando Ranson; Travis Steele
- Home arena: Cintas Center

2010–11 Atlantic 10 men's basketball standings
| | Conf. | | | | Overall |
| Team | W | | L | PCT | W | | L | PCT |
|---|---|---|---|---|---|---|---|---|
| No. 20 Xavier | 15 | – | 1 | .938 | 24 | – | 8 | .750 |
| Temple | 14 | – | 2 | .875 | 26 | – | 8 | .765 |
| Richmond † | 13 | – | 3 | .813 | 29 | – | 8 | .784 |
| Duquesne | 10 | – | 6 | .625 | 19 | – | 13 | .594 |
| George Washington | 10 | – | 6 | .625 | 17 | – | 14 | .548 |
| Rhode Island | 9 | – | 7 | .563 | 20 | – | 14 | .588 |
| St. Bonaventure | 8 | – | 8 | .500 | 16 | – | 15 | .516 |
| Dayton | 7 | – | 9 | .438 | 22 | – | 14 | .611 |
| UMass | 7 | – | 9 | .438 | 15 | – | 15 | .500 |
| La Salle | 6 | – | 10 | .375 | 15 | – | 18 | .455 |
| Saint Louis | 6 | – | 10 | .375 | 12 | – | 19 | .387 |
| Saint Joseph's | 4 | – | 12 | .250 | 11 | – | 22 | .333 |
| Charlotte | 2 | – | 14 | .125 | 10 | – | 20 | .333 |
| Fordham | 1 | – | 15 | .063 | 7 | – | 21 | .250 |
† 2011 Atlantic 10 Tournament winner As of March 25, 2011; Rankings from AP Poll

The 2010–11 Xavier Musketeers men's basketball team represented Xavier University in the 2010–11 college basketball season. This was head coach Chris Mack's second season at Xavier. The Musketeers competed in the Atlantic 10 Conference and played their home games at the Cintas Center. They finished the season 24–8, 15–1 in A-10 play to win the regular season conference championship. The Musketeers lost in the quarterfinals of the A-10 tournament to Dayton. They received an at-large bid to the NCAA tournament as a #6 seed, where they lost in the second round to Marquette.

== Previous season ==
The Musketeers finished the 2009–10 season 26–9, 14–2 in A-10 play to win a share of the regular season championship. They lost in the semifinals of the A-10 tournament to Richmond. The Musketeers received an at-large bid as a #6 seed to the NCAA tournament, where they defeated Minnesota and Pittsburgh before losing to Kansas State in the Sweet Sixteen.

== Preseason ==
This was head coach Chris Mack's second season at Xavier.

On October 21, 2010, the Musketeers were picked by other Atlantic 10 coaches to finish second in the league standings and received three first place votes. Tu Holloway was named to the All-Conference Second Team, while Dante Jackson was named to the defensive team. Jay Bilas of ESPN named Xavier the top team in the Atlantic 10, and praised the coaching job Mack did in his initial season.

== Roster ==
| # | Name | Height | Weight (lbs.) | Position | Class | Hometown | Previous team(s) |
|---|---|---|---|---|---|---|---|
| 2 | Jordan Latham | 6'8" | 220 | F | Fr. | Baltimore, MD, U.S. | Baltimore City College HS |
| 10 | Mark Lyons | 6'1" | 195 | G | So. | Schenectady, NY, U.S. | Brewster Academy |
| 11 | Jay Canty | 6'6" | 190 | G/F | Fr. | Jamestown, NC, U.S. | Oak Ridge Military Academy |
| 12 | Brad Redford | 6'0" | 175 | G | Jr. | Frankenmuth, MI, U.S. | Frankenmuth HS |
| 13 | Kevin Feeney | 6'3" | 170 | G | Sr. | Monticello, IL, U.S. | Monticello HS |
| 14 | Johnny Mazza | 6'0" | 160 | G | Jr. | Cincinnati, OH, U.S. | St. Xavier HS |
| 15 | Andrew Taylor | 6'8" | 215 | F | Jr. | Toledo, OH, U.S. | St. John's Jesuit HS |
| 15 | Justin Martin | 6'7" | 200 | F | Fr. | Beckley, WV, U.S. | Mountain State |
| 21 | Jeff Robinson | 6'9" | 200 | F | So. | Indianapolis, IN, U.S. | Lawrence HS |
| 22 | Jamel McLean | 6'8" | 235 | F | Sr. | Hampton, VA, U.S. | Bethel HS |
| 25 | Danté Jackson | 6'5" | 195 | G | Sr. | Greenfield, OH, U.S. | McClain HS |
| 32 | Kenny Frease | 7'0" | 265 | C | Jr. | Massillon, OH, U.S. | Perry HS |
| 33 | Joe Hughes | 6'6" | 205 | F | Sr. | Indianapolis, IN, U.S. | Cathedral HS |
| 52 | Tu Holloway | 6'0" | 185 | G | Jr. | Hempstead, NY, U.S. | Harmony Community School |

== Schedule ==
| Date time, TV | Rank^{#} | Opponent^{#} | Result | Record | Site (attendance) city, state |
Exhibition
| 11/2/10*; 7:00 pm | | Northern Kentucky | W 73–62 | — | Cintas Center (9,280); Cincinnati, OH |
| 11/6/10*; 7:00 pm | | Bellarmine | L 61–63 | — | Cintas Center (10,015); Cincinnati, OH |
Regular season
| 11/12/10*; 7:00 pm, FS Ohio | | Western Michigan | W 68–65 | 1–0 | Cintas Center (10,250); Cincinnati, OH |
| 11/16/10*; 7:00 pm, FS Ohio | | IPFW | W 76–66 ^{OT} | 2–0 | Cintas Center (9,949); Cincinnati, OH |
| 11/19/10*; 8:30 pm | | vs. Iowa; Paradise Jam first round | W 86–73 | 3–0 | Sports and Fitness Center (3,132); Saint Thomas, VI |
| 11/21/10*; 8:40 pm, FCS | | vs. Seton Hall; Paradise Jam semi-finals | W 57–52 | 4–0 | Sports and Fitness Center (3,365); Saint Thomas, VI |
| 11/22/10*; 8:00 pm | | vs. Old Dominion; Paradise Jam finals | L 58–67 | 4–1 | Sports and Fitness Center (3,893); Saint Thomas, VI |
| 11/27/10*; 6:30 pm, FS Ohio | | Wofford | W 94–90 ^{3OT} | 5–1 | Cintas Center (2,921); Cincinnati, OH |
| 12/1/10*; 7:00 pm | | at Miami (OH) | L 64–75 | 5–2 | Millett Hall (3,945); Oxford, Ohio |
| 12/9/10*; 9:00 pm, ESPN | | Butler | W 51–49 | 6–2 | Cintas Center (10,250); Cincinnati, OH |
| 12/18/10*; 8:00 pm, CBSCS | | Wake Forest | W 83–75 | 7–2 | Cintas Center (10,250); Cincinnati, OH |
| 12/22/10*; 11:00 pm, ESPN2 | | at Gonzaga | L 54–64 | 7–3 | McCarthey Athletic Center (6,000); Spokane, WA |
| 12/28/10*; 7:00 pm, FS Ohio | | Albany | W 88–64 | 8–3 | Cintas Center (10,004); Cincinnati, OH |
| 12/31/10*; 4:00 pm, ESPN2 | | Florida | L 67–71 | 8–4 | Cintas Center (10,250); Cincinnati, OH |
| 1/6/11*; 7:00 pm, ESPN2 | | at Cincinnati; Crosstown Shootout | L 46–66 | 8–5 | Fifth Third Arena (13,176); Cincinnati, OH |
| 1/9/11; 6:30 pm, ESPNU | | at Rhode Island | W 72–45 | 9–5 (1–0) | Ryan Center (5,630); Kingston, RI |
| 1/12/11; 7:00 pm, CBSCS | | Massachusetts | W 79–50 | 10–5 (2–0) | Cintas Center (9,832); Cincinnati, OH |
| 1/15/11; 8:00 pm, CBSCS | | Dayton | W 81–76 | 11–5 (3–0) | Cintas Center (10,250); Cincinnati, OH |
| 1/19/11; 7:00 pm, CBSCS | | at St. Bonaventure | W 79–65 | 12–5 (4–0) | Reilly Center (4,244); St. Bonaventure, NY |
| 1/22/11; 12:00 pm, ESPN2 | | Temple | W 88–77 | 13–5 (5–0) | Cintas Center (10,250); Cincinnati, OH |
| 1/26/11; 7:00 pm, FS Ohio | | George Washington | W 81–74 | 14–5 (6–0) | Cintas Center (9,824); Cincinnati, OH |
| 1/29/11; 12:00 pm, ESPN2 | | at Richmond | W 85–62 | 15–5 (7–0) | Robins Center (8,514); Richmond, VA |
| 2/2/11; 7:30 pm, FS Ohio | | at Charlotte | L 62–66 | 15–6 (7–1) | Dale F. Halton Arena (6,378); Charlotte, NC |
| 2/5/11; 11:00 am, ESPNU | | Saint Louis | W 76–68 | 16–6 (8–1) | Cintas Center (10,250); Cincinnati, OH |
| 2/8/11*; 7:00 pm, ESPNU | | at Georgia | W 65–57 | 17–6 | Stegeman Coliseum (7,627); Athens, GA |
| 2/13/11; 2:00 pm, FS Ohio | | at Duquesne | W 71–63 | 18–6 (9–1) | A. J. Palumbo Center (10,509); Pittsburgh, PA |
| 2/16/11; 7:00 pm, CBSCS | No. 24 | at Saint Joseph's | W 74–54 | 19–6 (10–1) | Hagan Arena (3,911); Philadelphia, PA |
| 2/19/11; 8:00 pm, FS Ohio | No. 24 | Fordham | W 79–72 | 20–6 (11–1) | Cintas Center (10,250); Cincinnati, OH |
| 2/22/11; 7:00 pm, CBSCS | No. 25 | La Salle | W 100–62 | 21–6 (12–1) | Cintas Center (10,054); Cincinnati, OH |
| 2/27/11; 1:00 pm, ESPN2 | No. 25 | at Dayton | W 66–62 | 22–6 (13–1) | UD Arena (13,435); Dayton, OH |
| 3/2/11; 7:00 pm, CBSCS | No. 23 | Charlotte | W 68–48 | 23–6 (14–1) | Cintas Center (10,250); Cincinnati, OH |
| 3/5/11; 2:00 pm, CBSCS | No. 23 | Saint Louis | W 66–55 | 24–6 (15–1) | Chaifetz Arena (7,268); St. Louis, MO |
Atlantic 10 tournament
| 3/11/11; 12:00 pm, CBSCS | (1) No. 18 | vs. (9) Dayton; A-10 Quarterfinals | L 67–68 | 24–7 | Boardwalk Hall (5,354); Atlantic City, NJ |
NCAA tournament
| 3/18/11*; 7:27 pm, truTV | (6 E) No. 20 | vs. (11 E) Marquette; NCAA Second Round | L 55–66 | 24–8 | Quicken Loans Arena (20,163); Cleveland, OH |
*Non-conference game. ^{#}Rankings from AP Poll. (#) Tournament seedings in parentheses. E=NCAA East Regional. All times are in Eastern Time.

== Season ==
=== Preconference season ===
Tu Holloway had a triple-double as Xavier defeated Wake Forest 83–75 in the Skip Prosser Classic. Playing with a cut above his eyebrow, Holloway scored 12 points, dished a career-high 14 assists and grabbed a career-high 14 rebounds. David West was the last Xavier player to record a triple-double when he had one against Long Island University on December 8, 2001. Xavier started the game on a 12–2 run and forced Wake Forest into six turnovers in the first five minutes. The Musketeers led the entire game, and Kenny Frease scored a career-high 22 points.

The annual Crosstown Shootout was held on January 6, 2011, pitting the Musketeers against archrival Cincinnati. In what was Xavier's lowest-scoring game in seven years, the Musketeers lost in convincing fashion 66–46. The Bearcats, meanwhile, improved to 15–0, equalling their second best start. Xavier hit one shot from beyond the arc on ten attempts. The Musketeers were led by Jamel McLean's 18 points, while Tu Holloway was held to five, well below his season average.

== Awards & honors ==
Tu Holloway

- Preseason All-Atlantic 10 Second Team
- Bob Cousy Award Watchlist
- November 15, 2010 Atlantic 10 Conference Player of the Week
- November 22, 2010 Atlantic 10 Conference Player of the Week
- December 20, 2010 Atlantic 10 Conference Player of the Week
- January 24, 2011 Atlantic 10 Conference Player of the Week

Dante Jackson

- Preseason All-Atlantic 10 Defensive Team
