= 2011 Atlantic 10 men's basketball tournament =

- 2011 Atlantic 10 Tournament logo
- Classification: Division I
- Season: 2010–11
- Teams: 12
- Site: Boardwalk Hall; Atlantic City, New Jersey
- Champions: Richmond Spiders (1st title)
- Winning coach: Chris Mooney (1st title)
- MVP: Kevin Anderson, (Richmond)
- Top scorer: Kevin Anderson, (Richmond) (66 points)

2010–11 Atlantic 10 men's basketball standings
	Conf.				Overall
Team	W		L	PCT	W		L	PCT
No. 20 Xavier	15	–	1	.938	24	–	8	.750
Temple	14	–	2	.875	26	–	8	.765
Richmond †	13	–	3	.813	29	–	8	.784
Duquesne	10	–	6	.625	19	–	13	.594
George Washington	10	–	6	.625	17	–	14	.548
Rhode Island	9	–	7	.563	20	–	14	.588
St. Bonaventure	8	–	8	.500	16	–	15	.516
Dayton	7	–	9	.438	22	–	14	.611
UMass	7	–	9	.438	15	–	15	.500
La Salle	6	–	10	.375	15	–	18	.455
Saint Louis	6	–	10	.375	12	–	19	.387
Saint Joseph's	4	–	12	.250	11	–	22	.333
Charlotte	2	–	14	.125	10	–	20	.333
Fordham	1	–	15	.063	7	–	21	.250
† 2011 Atlantic 10 Tournament winner As of March 25, 2011; Rankings from AP Poll

The 2011 Atlantic 10 men's basketball tournament was played initially at campus sites for the opening round on March 8, 2011 and subsequently at Boardwalk Hall in Atlantic City, New Jersey from March 11 through March 13, 2011. It was the fifth consecutive year that the tournament is hosted in Boardwalk Hall. The Richmond Spiders won the tournament and thereby received an automatic bid to the 2011 NCAA Men's Division I Basketball Tournament.

Seeding for the tournament was determined by the conference standings at the end of the regular season, with the last two teams in the standings not qualifying for the tournament. First round games were held at the home of the higher (lower number) seed.

Richmond's victory was the first for the Spiders in ten years as members of the Atlantic 10 Conference, breaking Temple University's string of three consecutive conference tournament championships by defeating the Owls in the semifinals.

Richmond senior point guard Kevin Anderson was named Most Outstanding Player for the tournament, leading all scorers with 66 points over three games, including a game-high 23 points in the championship game. Joining Anderson on the All-Championship Team were teammate Justin Harper, Dayton's Chris Wright and Chris Johnson, and Temple's Lavoy Allen.

The championship game was nationally televised on CBS. Three first round games and both semifinal games were televised nationally by CBS College Sports, while all four quarterfinal games were offered by the network via syndication.

== Tie-breakers ==
- Duquesne earned the 4th seed over George Washington with a 1–0 record in head-to-head games.
- Massachusetts earned the 8th seed over Dayton with a 1–0 record in head-to-head games.
- La Salle earned the 10th seed over St. Louis with a 1–0 record in head-to-head games.

== Bracket ==
First round Campus Sites; March 8
8	UMass	50
9	Dayton	78
5	George Washington	59
12	Saint Joseph's	71*
7	St. Bonaventure	73
10	La Salle	75*
6	Rhode Island	70
11	Saint Louis	61

Quarterfinals; Boardwalk Hall; March 11
1	#18 Xavier	67
9	Dayton	68
4	Duquesne	90
12	Saint Joseph's	93*
2	#24 Temple	96
10	La Salle	76
3	Richmond	55
6	Rhode Island	45

Semifinals; Boardwalk Hall; March 12
9	Dayton	64
12	Saint Joseph's	61
2	#24 Temple	54
3	Richmond	58

Championship Game; Boardwalk Hall; March 13
9	Dayton	54
3	Richmond	67

Asterisk denotes game ended in overtime.
