= 2010–11 Richmond Spiders men's basketball team =

American college basketball season

2010–11 Richmond Spiders men's basketball

Chicago Invitational Challenge Champions Atlantic 10 Tournament Champions

NCAA tournament, Sweet Sixteen
- Conference: Atlantic 10 Conference

Ranking
- Coaches: No. 21
- Record: 29–8 (13–3 A-10)
- Head coach: Chris Mooney (6th season)
- Assistant coaches: Kevin McGeehan (6th season); Jamal Brunt (4th season); Rob Jones (3rd season)
- Home arena: Robins Center

2010–11 Atlantic 10 men's basketball standings
	Conf.				Overall
Team	W		L	PCT	W		L	PCT
No. 20 Xavier	15	–	1	.938	24	–	8	.750
Temple	14	–	2	.875	26	–	8	.765
Richmond †	13	–	3	.813	29	–	8	.784
Duquesne	10	–	6	.625	19	–	13	.594
George Washington	10	–	6	.625	17	–	14	.548
Rhode Island	9	–	7	.563	20	–	14	.588
St. Bonaventure	8	–	8	.500	16	–	15	.516
Dayton	7	–	9	.438	22	–	14	.611
UMass	7	–	9	.438	15	–	15	.500
La Salle	6	–	10	.375	15	–	18	.455
Saint Louis	6	–	10	.375	12	–	19	.387
Saint Joseph's	4	–	12	.250	11	–	22	.333
Charlotte	2	–	14	.125	10	–	20	.333
Fordham	1	–	15	.063	7	–	21	.250
† 2011 Atlantic 10 Tournament winner As of March 25, 2011; Rankings from AP Poll

The 2010–11 Richmond Spiders men's basketball team represented the University of Richmond in National Collegiate Athletic Association (NCAA) Division I college basketball during the 2010–11 season. Richmond competed as a member of the Atlantic 10 Conference (A-10) under sixth-year head basketball coach Chris Mooney and played its home games at the Robins Center.

After finishing in third place in the Atlantic 10 during the regular season, Richmond defeated the University of Dayton to win the 2011 Atlantic 10 men's basketball tournament. With the championship, Richmond was awarded an automatic bid to the 2011 NCAA Division I men's basketball tournament, where it received a 12-seed and defeated Vanderbilt in the second round of the tournament before eliminating Morehead State in the third round. The Spiders fell in the Sweet Sixteen to Kansas.

== Preseason ==
Point guard and reigning Atlantic 10 Player of the Year Kevin Anderson was named to the preseason watchlist for the John R. Wooden Award.

=== Recruiting ===
College recruiting information
Name	Hometown	School	Height	Weight	Commit date
Cedrick Lindsay; SG	Washington, DC	Gonzaga College HS	6 ft 1 in (1.85 m)	180 lb (82 kg)	Aug 23, 2009
Cedrick Lindsay; SG	Recruit ratings: Scout: Rivals: (86)				
Derrick Williams; PF	Jersey City, NJ	St. Anthony HS	6 ft 6 in (1.98 m)	250 lb (110 kg)	Oct 19, 2009
Derrick Williams; PF	Recruit ratings: Scout: Rivals: (88)				
Wayne Sparrow; SG	Baltimore, MD	St. Frances Academy	6 ft 3 in (1.91 m)	175 lb (79 kg)	Oct 25, 2008
Wayne Sparrow; SG	Recruit ratings: Scout: Rivals: (82)				
Overall recruit ranking: Scout: NR Rivals: NR ESPN: NR
Note: In many cases, Scout, Rivals, 247Sports, On3, and ESPN may conflict in their listings of height and weight.; In these cases, the average was taken. ESPN grades are on a 100-point scale.; Sources: "Rivals.com 2010 Richmond Commitments". Rivals.; "Scout.com 2010 Richmond Commitments". Scout.; "ESPN 2010 Richmond Commitments". ESPN.; "Scout.com Team Recruiting Rankings". Scout.; "2010 Team Ranking". Rivals.

== Roster ==
2010–11 Richmond Spiders men's basketball team
Players
Coaches

Pos.	#	Name	Height	Weight	Year	Hometown
C	1	Darrius Garrett	6 ft 9 in (2.06 m)	210 lb (95 kg)	Jr	Raleigh, North Carolina
G	2	Cedrick Lindsay	6 ft 0 in (1.83 m)	190 lb (86 kg)	Fr	Washington, D.C.
G	3	Darien Brothers	6 ft 3 in (1.91 m)	205 lb (93 kg)	So	Richmond, Virginia
G	10	Jonathan Benjamin	6 ft 1 in (1.85 m)	175 lb (79 kg)	So	Rochester, New York
F/C	11	Josh Duinker	6 ft 11 in (2.11 m)	230 lb (104 kg)	RS Jr	Sydney, Australia
F	12	Kevin Smith	6 ft 5 in (1.96 m)	200 lb (91 kg)	Sr	Murfreesboro, Tennessee
G/F	13	Zak Estes	6 ft 4 in (1.93 m)	200 lb (91 kg)	Jr	Indianapolis, Indiana
G	14	Kevin Anderson	6 ft 0 in (1.83 m)	175 lb (79 kg)	Sr	Atlanta, Georgia
F	15	Francis-Cedric Martel	6 ft 6 in (1.98 m)	205 lb (93 kg)	Jr	Montreal, Canada
G/F	21	Kevin Hovde	6 ft 6 in (1.98 m)	215 lb (98 kg)	RS Sr	Kennett Square, Pennsylvania
G/F	22	Greg Robbins	6 ft 5 in (1.96 m)	215 lb (98 kg)	So	Wynnewood, Pennsylvania
G	24	Liam Billings	6 ft 4 in (1.93 m)	200 lb (91 kg)	RS So	Winter Park, Florida
F	31	Conor Smith	6 ft 9 in (2.06 m)	225 lb (102 kg)	RS Jr	Brookfield, Wisconsin
F	32	Justin Harper	6 ft 10 in (2.08 m)	225 lb (102 kg)	Sr	Richmond, Virginia
G	35	Wayne Sparrow (redshirt)	6 ft 3 in (1.91 m)	175 lb (79 kg)	Fr	Baltimore, Maryland
F	34	Derrick Williams	6 ft 6 in (1.98 m)	270 lb (122 kg)	Fr	Staten Island, New York
C	41	Dan Geriot	6 ft 9 in (2.06 m)	235 lb (107 kg)	RS Sr	Springfield, Pennsylvania

Head coach

- Chris Mooney (Princeton)

Assistant coach(es)

- Kevin McGeehan (Gettysburg)
- Jamal Brunt (Randolph-Macon)
- Rob Jones (Toccoa Falls)

Legend

- (C) Team captain
- (S) Suspended
- (I) Ineligible
- (W) Walk-on
- Injured
- Current redshirt

Roster
Last update: 2010-10-06

== Schedule ==
Date time, TV	Rank^{#}	Opponent^{#}	Result	Record	Site (attendance) city, state
Regular Season
November 12*; 7:00 pm		The Citadel	W 79–37	1–0	Robins Center (6,008); Richmond, Virginia
November 15*; 7:00 pm		William & Mary	W 73–49	2–0	Robins Center (4,320); Richmond, Virginia
November 18*; 7:30 pm		at Iona	L 77–81 ^{2OT}	2–1	Hynes Athletic Center (2,611); New Rochelle, New York
November 21*; 4:00 pm		Charleston Southern; Chicago Invitational Challenge	W 82–71	3–1	Robins Center (4,104); Richmond, Virginia
November 23*; 12:00 pm		Southern; Chicago Invitational Challenge	W 81–40	4–1	Robins Center (3,126); Richmond, Virginia
November 26*; 6:00 pm		vs. Wright State; Chicago Invitational Challenge	W 71–61	5–1	Sears Centre (3,392); Hoffman Estates, Illinois
November 27*; 7:30 pm, Big Ten Network		vs. No. 10 Purdue; Chicago Invitational Challenge	W 65–54	6–1	Sears Centre (2,832); Hoffman Estates, Illinois
December 1*; 7:00 pm		at Old Dominion	L 70–77	6–2	Ted Constant Convocation Center (7,824); Norfolk, Virginia
December 5*; 2:00 pm, Fox College Sports		at Arizona State	W 67–61	7–2	Wells Fargo Arena (7,731); Tempe, Arizona
December 11*; 7:00 pm		VCU; Black & Blue Classic	W 72–60	8–2	Robins Center (8,906); Richmond, Virginia
December 18*; 5:00 pm		vs. Georgia Tech; Battle at Atlantis	L 54–67	8–3	Atlantis Paradise Island (3,480); Paradise Island, Bahamas
December 22*; 12:00 pm		at UNC Greensboro	W 63–53	9–3	Greensboro Coliseum (2,317); Greensboro, North Carolina
December 26*; 12:00 pm		at Seton Hall	W 69–61	10–3	Prudential Center (6,634); Newark, New Jersey
December 29*; 7:00 pm		Wake Forest	W 90–74	11–3	Robins Center (8,113); Richmond, Virginia
January 2*; 4:00 pm		Bucknell	L 61–62	11–4	Robins Center (5,426); Richmond, Virginia
January 5; 7:00 pm		Charlotte	W 71–59	12–4 (1–0)	Robins Center (4,231); Richmond, Virginia
January 8; 4:00 pm, CBS College Sports		at La Salle	W 87–68	13–4 (2–0)	Tom Gola Arena (1,868); Philadelphia, Pennsylvania
January 13; 7:00 pm, CBS College Sports		Rhode Island	L 74–78	13–5 (2–1)	Robins Center (6,371); Richmond, Virginia
January 19; 7:00 pm		George Washington	W 68–58	14–5 (3–1)	Robins Center (5,039); Richmond, Virginia
January 22; 12:00 pm, CBS College Sports		at UMass	W 84–68	15–5 (4–1)	Mullins Center (3,921); Amherst, Massachusetts
January 25; 7:00 pm, ESPNU		at Dayton	W 70–61	16–5 (5–1)	University of Dayton Arena (12,126); Dayton, Ohio
January 29; 12:00 pm, ESPN2		Xavier	L 62–85	16–6 (5–2)	Robins Center (8,514); Richmond, Virginia
February 2; 7:00 pm		Saint Joseph's	W 62–52	17–6 (6–2)	Robins Center (5,011); Richmond, Virginia
February 5; 1:00 pm		at Fordham	W 77–60	18–6 (7–2)	Rose Hill Gym (2,715); Bronx, New York
February 9; 7:00 pm		at George Washington	W 69–65	19–6 (8–2)	Smith Center (2,159); Washington, D.C.
February 12; 12:00 pm, ESPN2		Saint Louis	W 64–52	20–6 (9–2)	Robins Center (6,398); Richmond, Virginia
February 17; 7:00 pm, CBS College Sports		at No. 23 Temple	L 53–73	20–7 (9–3)	Liacouras Center (6,078); Philadelphia, Pennsylvania
February 20; 3:00 pm, CBS College Sports		St. Bonaventure	W 82–65	21–7 (10–3)	Robins Center (7,291); Richmond, Virginia
February 26; 7:00 pm		at Charlotte	W 72–59	22–7 (11–3)	Halton Arena (6,156); Charlotte, North Carolina
March 2; 7:00 pm		at Saint Joseph's	W 69–54	23–7 (12–3)	Hagan Arena (3,651); Philadelphia, Pennsylvania
March 5; 12:00 pm, CBS College Sports		Duquesne	W 68–56	24–7 (13–3)	Robins Center (6,524); Richmond, Virginia
2011 Atlantic 10 men's basketball tournament
March 11; 9:00 pm, CBS College Sports	(3)	vs. (6) Rhode Island; A-10 Quarterfinal	W 55–45	25–7	Boardwalk Hall (7,321); Atlantic City, New Jersey
March 12; 3:30 pm, CBS College Sports	(3)	vs. (2) No. 24 Temple; A-10 Semifinal	W 58–54	26–7	Boardwalk Hall (8,285); Atlantic City, New Jersey
March 13; 1:00 pm, CBS	(3)	vs. (9) Dayton; A-10 Championship Game	W 67–54	27–7	Boardwalk Hall (5,602); Atlantic City, New Jersey
2011 NCAA Division I men's basketball tournament
March 17*; 4:10 pm, TBS	(12 SW)	vs. (5 SW) No. 25 Vanderbilt; NCAA Second Round	W 69–66	28–7	Pepsi Center (18,499); Denver, Colorado
March 19*; 5:15 pm, CBS	(12 SW)	vs. (13 SW) Morehead State; NCAA Third Round	W 65–48	29–7	Pepsi Center (19,328); Denver, Colorado
March 25*; 7:27 pm, TBS	(12 SW)	vs. (1 SW) No. 2 Kansas; NCAA Sweet Sixteen	L 57–77	29–8	Alamodome (14,566); San Antonio, Texas
*Non-conference game. ^{#}Rankings from AP Poll. (#) Tournament seedings in parentheses. SW=NCAA Southwest Regional. All times are in Eastern Time.
