= 2010–11 Saint Louis Billikens men's basketball team =

American college basketball season

2010–11 Saint Louis Billikens men's basketball
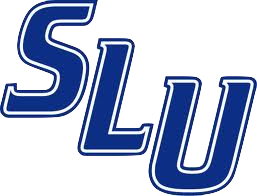
- Conference: Atlantic 10 Conference
- Record: 12–19 (6–10 A-10)
- Head coach: Rick Majerus
- Assistant coaches: Porter Moser; Chris Harriman; Alex Jensen
- Home arena: Chaifetz Arena

2010–11 Atlantic 10 men's basketball standings
	Conf.				Overall
Team	W		L	PCT	W		L	PCT
No. 20 Xavier	15	–	1	.938	24	–	8	.750
Temple	14	–	2	.875	26	–	8	.765
Richmond †	13	–	3	.813	29	–	8	.784
Duquesne	10	–	6	.625	19	–	13	.594
George Washington	10	–	6	.625	17	–	14	.548
Rhode Island	9	–	7	.563	20	–	14	.588
St. Bonaventure	8	–	8	.500	16	–	15	.516
Dayton	7	–	9	.438	22	–	14	.611
UMass	7	–	9	.438	15	–	15	.500
La Salle	6	–	10	.375	15	–	18	.455
Saint Louis	6	–	10	.375	12	–	19	.387
Saint Joseph's	4	–	12	.250	11	–	22	.333
Charlotte	2	–	14	.125	10	–	20	.333
Fordham	1	–	15	.063	7	–	21	.250
† 2011 Atlantic 10 Tournament winner As of March 25, 2011; Rankings from AP Poll

The 2010–11 Saint Louis Billikens men's basketball team schedule was released in early August 2010. Rick Majerus was in his 4th season coaching the Billikens. They finished 11–5 in Atlantic 10 Conference and 23–13 overall last season.

== Roster ==
2010–11 Saint Louis Billikens men's basketball team
Players
Coaches

Pos.	#	Name	Height	Weight	Year	Previous school	Hometown
G	5	Jordair Jett	6 ft 1 in (1.85 m)	210 lb (95 kg)	So	Notre Dame Prep.	St. Paul, MN
G	11	Mike McCall Jr.	6 ft 0 in (1.83 m)	165 lb (75 kg)	So	Foreman High School	Chicago, IL
G	13	Brian Daly	6 ft 3 in (1.91 m)	160 lb (73 kg)	So	Loyola Academy	Evanston, IL
F	14	Brian Conklin	6 ft 6 in (1.98 m)	230 lb (104 kg)	Sr	North Eugene High School	Eugene, OR
F	21	Dwayne Evans	6 ft 5 in (1.96 m)	205 lb (93 kg)	So	Neuqua Valley High School	Bolingbrook, IL
G	23	Kyle Cassity	6 ft 5 in (1.96 m)	205 lb (93 kg)	Jr	Pinckneyville Community High School	Tamaroa, IL
F	24	Cody Ellis	6 ft 8 in (2.03 m)	240 lb (109 kg)	So	Duncraig Senior High School	Perth, Australia
F	30	Jake Barnett (redshirt)	6 ft 5 in (1.96 m)	205 lb (93 kg)	Fr	Wauwatosa East High School	Wauwatosa, WI
F	32	Cory Remekun	6 ft 8 in (2.03 m)	205 lb (93 kg)	So	Mesquite High School	Dallas, TX
F	51	Rob Loe	6 ft 11 in (2.11 m)	240 lb (109 kg)	Fr	Westlake Boys High School	Leicester, England

Head coach

- Rick Majerus (Maquette)

Assistant coach(es)

- Poster Moser (Creighton)
- Alex Jensen (Utah)
- Chris Harriman (Augusta State)

Legend

- (C) Team captain
- (S) Suspended
- (I) Ineligible
- (W) Walk-on
- Injured
- Current redshirt

Roster
Last update: 02/20/2018

== Season schedule ==
Date time, TV	Rank^{#}	Opponent^{#}	Result	Record	Site (attendance) city, state
Exhibition
11/02/2010*; 7:00 PM		Cardinal Stritch	W 73–53	–	Chaifetz Arena; St. Louis, MO
11/05/2010*; 1:00 PM		Nova Southeastern	W 78–62	–	Chaifetz Arena; St. Louis, MO
Regular season
11/12/2010*; 7:30 PM		Austin Peay	L 62–64	0–1	Chaifetz Arena (7,511); St. Louis, MO
11/15/2010*; 7:00 PM		Rockhurst	W 72–45	1-1	Chaifetz Arena (5,178); St. Louis, MO
11/20/2010*; 7:00 PM		Georgia	L 59–61	1-2	Chaifetz Arena (6,761); St. Louis, MO
11/23/2010*; 1:00 PM		Tennessee State	W 78–50	2-2	Chaifetz Arena (5,384); St. Louis, MO
11/25/2010*; 1:00 PM		IUPUI	W 58-55	3–2	Chaifetz Arena (5,558); St. Louis, MO
11/30/2010*; 9:00 PM		at Portland	L 60–69	3–3	Chiles Center (1,343); Portland, OR
12/11/2010*; 11:00 AM		at No. 1 Duke	L 47–84	3–4	Cameron Indoor Stadium (9,314); Durham, NC
12/15/2010*; 7:00 PM		Jacksonville	W 69–64	4–4	Chaifetz Arena (6,143); St. Louis, MO
12/18/2010*; 7:00 PM		at Missouri State	L 65–81	4–5	JQH Arena (7,896); Springfield, MO
12/22/2010*; 11:00 AM		vs. Northeastern; Cancún Governor's Cup first round	W 71–49	5–5	Polifórum Benito Juárez; Cancún, Mexico
12/23/2010*; 1:30 PM, ESPNU		vs. Southern Miss; Cancún Governor's Cup semi-finals	L 67–74	5–6	Polifórum Benito Juárez; Cancún, Mexico
12/24/2010*; 6:00 PM, ESPN2		vs. Ole Miss; Cancún Governor's Cup	L 61–69	5–7	Polifórum Benito Juárez; Cancún, Mexico
01/01/2011*; 3:00 PM		Bowling Green	L 61–67	5–8	Chaifetz Arena (6,754); St. Louis, MO
01/05/2011; 7:00 PM		Dayton	L 72–79	5–9 (0–1)	Chaifetz Arena (7,621); St. Louis, MO
01/09/2011; 1:00 PM		at Temple	L 53–57	5–10 (0–2)	Liacouras Center (3,336); Philadelphia, PA
01/12/2011; 6:00 PM		at Duquesne	L 45–67	5–11 (0–3)	A. J. Palumbo Center (2,422); Pittsburgh, PA
01/15/2011; 1:00 PM		Saint Joseph's	W 67–51	6–11 (1–3)	Chaifetz Arena (6,908); St. Louis, MO
01/21/2011; 7:00 PM		vs. Fordham	W 68–55	7–11 (2–3)	Izod Center (1,257); East Rutherford, NJ
01/26/2011; 8:00 PM		Rhode Island	L 57–59	7–12 (2–4)	Chaifetz Arena (6,004); St. Louis, MO
01/29/2011; 1:00 PM		at George Washington	L 46–52	7–13 (2–5)	Charles E. Smith Center (2,050); Washington, DC
02/02/2011; 7:00		UMass	W 69–53	8–13 (3–5)	Chaifetz Arena (4,086); St. Louis, MO
02/05/2011; 10:00 AM, ESPNU		at Xavier	L 68–76	8–14 (3–6)	Cintas Center (10,250); Cincinnati, OH
02/09/2011; 8:00 PM		La Salle	L 77–78	8–15 (3–7)	Chaifetz Arena (5,364); St. Louis, MO
02/12/2011; 11:00 AM, ESPN2		at Richmond	L 52–64	8–16 (3–8)	Robins Stadium (6,398); Richmond, VA
02/16/2011; 6:00 PM		at St. Bonaventure	L 73–83	8–17 (3–9)	Reilly Center (3,264); Saint Bonaventure, NY
02/19/2011; 7:00 PM		Charlotte	W 61–56	9–17 (4–9)	Chaifetz Arena (7,187); St. Louis, MO
02/22/2011*; 7:00 PM		Chicago State	W 90–52	10–17	Chaifetz Arena (5,184); St. Louis, MO
02/26/2011; 7:00 PM		Duquesne	W 62–51	11–17 (5–9)	Chaifetz Arena (7,438); St. Louis, MO
03/02/2011; 6:00 PM		at Dayton	W 69–51	12–17 (6–9)	University of Dayton Arena (12,658); Dayton, OH
03/05/2011; CCSN		No. 23 Xavier; Homecoming	L 55–66	12-18 (6–10)	Chaifetz Arena (7,268); St. Louis, MO
Atlantic 10 tournament
03/08/11; 6:00 PM	(11)	vs. (6) Rhode Island; First Round	L 61–70	12–19	Ryan Center (2,434); Kingston, RI
*Non-conference game. ^{#}Rankings from AP Poll. (#) Tournament seedings in parentheses. All times are in Central Time.
