= 2010–11 UMass Minutemen basketball team =

American college basketball season

2010–11 UMass Minutemen men's basketball
- Conference: Atlantic 10 Conference
- Record: 15–15 (7–9 A-10)
- Head coach: Derek Kellogg (3rd season)
- Assistant coaches: Adam Ginsburg; Antwon Jackson; Vance Walberg
- Home arena: William D. Mullins Memorial Center

2010–11 Atlantic 10 men's basketball standings
	Conf.				Overall
Team	W		L	PCT	W		L	PCT
No. 20 Xavier	15	–	1	.938	24	–	8	.750
Temple	14	–	2	.875	26	–	8	.765
Richmond †	13	–	3	.813	29	–	8	.784
Duquesne	10	–	6	.625	19	–	13	.594
George Washington	10	–	6	.625	17	–	14	.548
Rhode Island	9	–	7	.563	20	–	14	.588
St. Bonaventure	8	–	8	.500	16	–	15	.516
Dayton	7	–	9	.438	22	–	14	.611
UMass	7	–	9	.438	15	–	15	.500
La Salle	6	–	10	.375	15	–	18	.455
Saint Louis	6	–	10	.375	12	–	19	.387
Saint Joseph's	4	–	12	.250	11	–	22	.333
Charlotte	2	–	14	.125	10	–	20	.333
Fordham	1	–	15	.063	7	–	21	.250
† 2011 Atlantic 10 Tournament winner As of March 25, 2011; Rankings from AP Poll

The 2010–11 UMass Minutemen basketball team represented the University of Massachusetts Amherst during the 2010–11 NCAA Division I men's basketball season. The Minutemen, led by third year head coach Derek Kellogg, played their home games at William D. Mullins Memorial Center, with one home game played at Curry Hicks Cage, and are members of the Atlantic 10 Conference. They finished the season 15–15, 7–9 in A-10 play to finish for eighth place. UMass lost in the first round of the Atlantic 10 tournament to Dayton.

== Roster ==
Number	Name	Position	Height	Weight	Year	Hometown
1	Maxie Esho	Forward	6–8	200	Freshman	Upper Marlboro, Maryland
2	Terrell Vinson	Forward	6–7	205	Sophomore	Baltimore, Maryland
4	Darryl Traynham	Guard	5–9	175	Freshman	Upper Marlboro, Maryland
5	Jesse Morgan	Guard	6–5	180	Freshman	Philadelphia, Pennsylvania
10	Javorn Farrell	Guard/Forward	6–5	180	Sophomore	Woodbridge, Virginia
11	Gary Correia	Guard	6–1	180	Senior	Providence, Rhode Island
12	Anthony Gurley	Guard	6–3	185	RS Senior	Boston, Massachusetts
13	Trey Lang	Forward	6–7	215	RS Junior	Marietta, Georgia
20	Jordan Couture	Guard	6–3	185	Freshman	West Springfield, Massachusetts
22	Sampson Carter	Forward	6–8	200	Sophomore	Baton Rouge, Louisiana
23	Sean Carter	Forward/Center	6–9	225	RS Junior	Fayetteville, North Carolina
24	Freddie Riley	Guard	6–5	175	Sophomore	Ocala, Florida
34	Raphiael Putney	Forward	6–8	180	RS Freshman	Woodbridge, Virginia
35	Hashim Bailey	Forward/Center	6–10	275	RS Senior	Paterson, New Jersey
50	Matt Hill	Forward	6–7	210	RS Junior	Middletown, Connecticut
52	Andrew McCarthy	Center	7–1	240	Freshman	Scituate, Massachusetts
	Chaz Williams	Guard	5–9	175	Sophomore	Brooklyn, New York

== Schedule ==
Date time, TV	Rank^{#}	Opponent^{#}	Result	Record	Site (attendance) city, state
Exhibition
11/04/2010*; 7:00 pm		Brandeis	W 83–60	—	Mullins Center (628); Amherst, MA
Regular Season
11/12/2010*; 7:30 pm, WSHM		Rider; Hall of Fame Tip-Off	W 77–67	1–0	Mullins Center (3,784); Amherst, MA
11/17/2010*; 7:00 pm		Sacred Heart	W 73–65	2–0	Mullins Center (2,374); Amherst, MA
11/20/2010*; 7:30 pm		vs. New Mexico State; Hall of Fame Tip-Off	W 71–57	3–0	MassMutual Center (2,274); Springfield, MA
11/22/2010*; 7:00 pm		vs. TCU; Hall of Fame Tip-Off	W 67–48	4–0	MassMutual Center (1,512); Springfield, MA
11/24/2010*; 7:00 pm, WSHM		American International; Hall of Fame Tip-Off	W 83–56	5–0	Mullins Center (2,116); Amherst, MA
11/27/2010*; 3:00 pm		Holy Cross	W 83–76	6–0	Curry Hicks Cage (3,395); Amherst, MA
12/01/2010*; 7:00 pm		at Quinnipiac	W 66–64	7–0	TD Bank Sports Center (1,914); Hamden, CT
12/4/2010*; 7:00 pm, CSNNE		vs. Boston College; Commonwealth Classic	L 71–76	7–1	TD Garden (10,642); Boston, MA
12/08/2010*; 7:00 pm, WSHM		Maine	L 56–68	7–2	Mullins Center (2,776); Amherst, MA
12/11/2010*; 7:00 pm, WSHM		Seton Hall	L 79–104	7–3	Mullins Center (4,321); Amherst, MA
12/22/2010*; 7:00 pm, WSHM		No. 24 UCF	L 59–64	7–4	Mullins Center (4,432); Amherst, MA
12/31/2010*; 2:00 pm, WSHM		Boston University	W 71–54	8–4	Mullins Center (3,464); Amherst, MA
01/03/2011*; 7:00 pm		at Central Connecticut	L 63–92	8–5	Detrick Gymnasium (2,317); New Britain, CT
01/09/2011; 2:00 pm, CBSCS		Dayton	W 55–50	9–5 (1–0)	Mullins Center (3,645); Amherst, MA
01/12/2011; 7:00 pm, CBSCS		at Xavier	L 50–79	9–6 (1–1)	Cintas Center (9,832); Cincinnati, OH
01/15/2011; 1:00 pm		vs. La Salle	W 74–71	10–6 (2–1)	MassMutual Center (2,532); Springfield, MA
01/19/2011; 7:30 pm		at Charlotte	W 73–54	11–6 (3–1)	Halton Arena (5,783); Charlotte, NC
01/22/2011; 12:00 pm, CSNNE		Richmond	L 68–84	11–7 (3–2)	Mullins Center (3,921); Amherst, MA
01/30/2011; 7:00 pm		at St. Bonaventure	W 64–54	12–7 (4–2)	Reilly Center (3,332); Olean, NY
01/30/2011; 7:00 pm, Cox		Rhode Island	W 64–54	13–7 (5–2)	Mullins Center (4,239); Amherst, MA
02/02/2011; 8:00 pm, CSNNE		at Saint Louis	L 53–69	13–8 (5–3)	Chaifetz Arena (4,086); St. Louis, Missouri
02/05/2011; 7:00 pm		at Saint Joseph's	L 64–67	13–9 (5–4)	Hagan Arena (3,742); Philadelphia, PA
02/13/2011; 4:00 pm, WSHM		George Washington	L 51–59	13–10 (5–5)	Mullins Center (3,098); Amherst, MA
02/16/2011; 7:00 pm, WSHM		Duquesne	L 63–81	13–11 (5–6)	Mullins Center (2,453); Amherst, MA
02/19/2011; 2:00 pm, Cox		at Rhode Island	W 66–60	14–11 (6–6)	Ryan Center (6,157); Kingston, RI
02/23/2011; 7:00 pm, CSNNE		Saint Joseph's	W 69–51	15–11 (7–6)	Mullins Center (3,641); Amherst, MA
02/27/2011; 2:00 pm		at La Salle	L 51–72	15–12 (7–7)	Tom Gola Arena (2,125); Philadelphia, PA
03/02/2011; 7:00 pm, WSHM		Temple	L 67–73 ^{OT}	15–13 (7–8)	Mullins Center (3,641); Amherst, MA
03/05/2011; 1:00 pm		at Fordham	L 73–77	15–14 (7–9)	Rose Hill Gymnasium (2,368); Bronx, NY
2011 Atlantic 10 men's basketball tournament
03/8/2011; 9:00 pm, CBSCS	(8)	(9) Dayton; A-10 First Round	L 50–78	15–15	Mullins Center (2,264); Amherst, MA
*Non-conference game. ^{#}Rankings from AP Poll. (#) Tournament seedings in parentheses. All times are in Eastern Time.
