= 2010–11 Rhode Island Rams men's basketball team =

American college basketball season

2010–11 Rhode Island Rams men's basketball

CBI, Quarterfinals
- Conference: Atlantic 10 Conference
- Record: 20–14 (9–7 A-10)
- Head coach: Jim Baron
- Home arena: Ryan Center

2010–11 Atlantic 10 men's basketball standings
	Conf.				Overall
Team	W		L	PCT	W		L	PCT
No. 20 Xavier	15	–	1	.938	24	–	8	.750
Temple	14	–	2	.875	26	–	8	.765
Richmond †	13	–	3	.813	29	–	8	.784
Duquesne	10	–	6	.625	19	–	13	.594
George Washington	10	–	6	.625	17	–	14	.548
Rhode Island	9	–	7	.563	20	–	14	.588
St. Bonaventure	8	–	8	.500	16	–	15	.516
Dayton	7	–	9	.438	22	–	14	.611
UMass	7	–	9	.438	15	–	15	.500
La Salle	6	–	10	.375	15	–	18	.455
Saint Louis	6	–	10	.375	12	–	19	.387
Saint Joseph's	4	–	12	.250	11	–	22	.333
Charlotte	2	–	14	.125	10	–	20	.333
Fordham	1	–	15	.063	7	–	21	.250
† 2011 Atlantic 10 Tournament winner As of March 25, 2011; Rankings from AP Poll

The 2010–2011 Rhode Island Rams men's basketball team represented the University of Rhode Island in the 2010–2011 college basketball season. The team was led by head coach Jim Baron in his tenth season as the head coach. The Rams competed in the Atlantic 10 Conference and played their home games at Ryan Center. Rhode Island ended the season at 20–14 (9–7 A-10 play), and lost in the second round of the Atlantic 10 men's basketball tournament to the eventual Atlantic 10 Tournament Champion, Richmond. They were invited to the 2011 College Basketball Invitational where they advanced to the quarterfinals and lost to UCF.

== Roster ==
No.	Player name	Height	Weight (lbs.)	Position	Class	Hometown	Previous team(s)
1	Jamal Wilson	6'5"	195	G	Jr.	Norristown, PA	Neumann-Goretti
2	Ben Eaves	6'7"	225	F	Sr.	Lancashire, England	University of Connecticut
5	Marquis Jones	6'1"	200	G	Sr.	South Plainfield, NJ	St. Thomas More Prep
10	Akeem Richmond	6'1"	180	G	So.	Sanford, NC	Southern Lee
11	Levan Shengelia	6'9"	260	F	Fr.	Tbilisi, GA	Maine Central Institute
12	Orion Outerbridge	6'9"	210	F	Jr.	Boston, MA	New Hampton School
15	Blake Vedder	7'3"	230	C	Fr.	Chesterland, OH	Impact Academy
21	Delroy James	6'8"	220	F	Sr.	Brooklyn, NY	Laurinburg Prep
22	Anthony Baskerville	5'11"	185	G	Jr.	Newark, NJ	Dean College
23	Nikola Malesevic	6'7"	200	F	So.	Uzice, Serbia	Uzicka Gimnazija
24	Ryan Brooks	6'8"	200	F	So.	Mays Landing, NJ	South Kent School
32	Will Martell	7'0"	245	C	Sr.	Fair Haven, NJ	The Hun School
44	Anthony Malhoit	6'3"	200	G	Sr.	Waterford, CT	UConn Avery Point

== Schedule ==
Date	Rank#	Opponent#	Result	Record	Location
Exhibition games
10/29/10		Concordia (Que.)	W 89-50		Kingston, Rhode Island
11/3/10		Rhode Island College	W 88-55		Kingston, Rhode Island
Regular season: non-conference play
11/8/10		@ #4 Pittsburgh (2K Sports classic)	L 83-75	0-1	Brooklyn, New York
11/16/10		Brown (Ocean State Cup)	W 92-67	1-1	Kingston, Pennsylvania
11/19/10		Charleston (2K Sports classic)	W 75-66	2-1	Brooklyn, New York
11/20/10		@ Akron (2K Sports Classic)	W 76-65	3-1	Brooklyn, New York
11/21/10		@ Illinois-Chicago (2K Sports classic)	L 74-68	3-2	Brooklyn, New York
11/24/10		Drexel	W 74-68	4-2	Kingston, Rhode Island
11/27/10		Davidson	W 71-58	5-2	Kingston, Rhode Island
12/4/10		Providence (Ocean State Cup)	L 87-74	5-3	Kingston, Rhode Island
12/8/10		@ Northeastern	W 79-67	6-3	Boston, Massachusetts
12/11/10		@ Quinnipiac	L 73-66	6-4	Hamden, Connecticut
12/18/10		New Hampshire	W 64-52	7-4	Kingston, Rhode Island
12/22/10		Lafayette	W 73-65	8-4	Kingston, Rhode Island
12/29/10		Boston College	W 67-65	9-4	Kingston, Rhode Island
1/3/11		Florida	L 84-59	9-5	Kingston, Rhode Island
Regular Season: Atlantic-10 Play
1/9/11		Xavier	L 72-45	9-6 (0-1)	Kingston, Rhode Island
1/13/11		@ Richmond	W 78-74	10-6 (1-1)	Richmond, Virginia
1/16/11		Saint Bonaventure	W 56-55	11-6 (2-1)	Kingston, Rhode Island
1/19/11		@ Saint Josephs's	W 64-59	12-6 (3-1)	Philadelphia, Pennsylvania
1/22/11		La Salle	L 76-75	12-7 (3-2)	Kingston, Rhode Island
1/26/11		@ Saint Louis	W 59-57	13-7 (4-2)	Saint Louis, Missouri
1/30/11		@ UMass	L 64-54	13-8 (4-3)	Amherst, Massachusetts
2/2/11		Fordham	W 72-52	14-8 (5-3)	Kingston, Rhode Island
2/5/11		@ Temple	L 80-67	14-9 (5-4)	Philadelphia, Pennsylvania
2/9/11		Dayton (Pink Out Game)	W 67-53	15-9 (6-4)	Kingston, Rhode Island
2/12/11		Charlotte	W 71-70 OT	16-9 (7-4)	Kingston, Rhode Island
2/19/11		UMass	L 66-60	16-10 (7-5)	Kingston, Rhode Island
2/23/11		@ Duquesne	W 77-76	17-10 (8-5)	Pittsburgh, Pennsylvania
2/26/11		@ Fordham	W 90-58	18-10 (9-5)	Bonx, New York
3/2/11		George Washington	L 66-55	18-11 (9-6)	Kingston, Rhode Island
3/5/11		@ Saint Bonaventure	L 74-68	18-12 (9-7)	Saint Bonaventure, New York
Atlantic-10 men's basketball tournament
3/8/11	(6)	(11) Saint Louis (first round)	W 70-61	19-12 (9-7)	Pittsburgh, Pennsylvania
3/11/11	(6)	@ (3) Richmond (quarterfinals)	L 55-45	19-13 (9-7)	Pittsburgh, Pennsylvania
College Basketball Invitational
3/16/11		Miami (OH) (first round)	W 76-59	20-13 (9-7)	Kingston, Rhode Island
3/21/11		@ UCF (quarterfinals)	L 66-54	20-14 (9-7)	Orlando, Florida
