= 2010–11 Duquesne Dukes men's basketball team =

American college basketball season

2010–11 Duquesne Dukes men's basketball

CBI, Quarterfinals
- Conference: Atlantic 10 Conference
- Record: 19–13 (10–6 A-10)
- Head coach: Ron Everhart (5th season)
- Assistant coaches: Steve Hall (3rd season); Greg Gary (1st season); Rodney Crawford (1st season)
- Home arena: A.J. Palumbo Center; CONSOL Energy Center

2010–11 Atlantic 10 men's basketball standings
	Conf.				Overall
Team	W		L	PCT	W		L	PCT
No. 20 Xavier	15	–	1	.938	24	–	8	.750
Temple	14	–	2	.875	26	–	8	.765
Richmond †	13	–	3	.813	29	–	8	.784
Duquesne	10	–	6	.625	19	–	13	.594
George Washington	10	–	6	.625	17	–	14	.548
Rhode Island	9	–	7	.563	20	–	14	.588
St. Bonaventure	8	–	8	.500	16	–	15	.516
Dayton	7	–	9	.438	22	–	14	.611
UMass	7	–	9	.438	15	–	15	.500
La Salle	6	–	10	.375	15	–	18	.455
Saint Louis	6	–	10	.375	12	–	19	.387
Saint Joseph's	4	–	12	.250	11	–	22	.333
Charlotte	2	–	14	.125	10	–	20	.333
Fordham	1	–	15	.063	7	–	21	.250
† 2011 Atlantic 10 Tournament winner As of March 25, 2011; Rankings from AP Poll

The 2010–11 Duquesne Dukes men's basketball team represented Duquesne University in the 2010–11 NCAA Division I men's basketball season. The Dukes, led by head coach Ron Everhart, played their home games at the A.J. Palumbo Center and CONSOL Energy Center in Pittsburgh, Pennsylvania, as members of the Atlantic 10 Conference. Duquesne started the year with a 16–5 record, the program's best start since the 1971–72 season, and won their first eight conference games for the first time ever. However, they ended the regular season losing six of their last eight games.

The Dukes finished fourth in the A-10 during the regular season, but were upset in the quarterfinals of the Atlantic 10 tournament by the 12th-seeded Saint Joseph's, ending their tournament run after just one game.

Duquesne failed to qualify for the NCAA tournament, but were invited to the 2011 College Basketball Invitational. The Dukes won their first game in the tournament, but were eliminated in the quarterfinals of the CBI after losing to eventual tournament champion Oregon, 77–75.

== Roster ==
2010–11 Duquesne Dukes men's basketball team
Players
Coaches

Pos.	#	Name	Height	Weight	Year	Hometown
F/C	0	Andre Marhold	6 ft 6 in (1.98 m)	215 lb (98 kg)	So	Charlotte, North Carolina
G	1	Mike Talley	5 ft 10 in (1.78 m)	170 lb (77 kg)	Fr	Detroit, Michigan
F	2	Joel Wright	6 ft 6 in (1.98 m)	220 lb (100 kg)	Fr	Brooklyn, New York
G	3	Eric Evans	5 ft 11 in (1.8 m)	210 lb (95 kg)	Jr	Detroit, Michigan
G/F	5	Jerry Jones	6 ft 4 in (1.93 m)	185 lb (84 kg)	Fr	Detroit, Michigan
G	20	T. J. McConnell	6 ft 0 in (1.83 m)	170 lb (77 kg)	Fr	Pittsburgh, Pennsylvania
F	22	David Theis	6 ft 8 in (2.03 m)	235 lb (107 kg)	Sr	Pittsburgh, Pennsylvania
G	23	B. J. Monteiro	6 ft 5 in (1.96 m)	200 lb (91 kg)	Jr	Waterbury, Connecticut
F	25	Damian Saunders	6 ft 7 in (2.01 m)	210 lb (95 kg)	Sr	Waterbury, Connecticut
G/F	30	Bill Clark	6 ft 5 in (1.96 m)	210 lb (95 kg)	Sr	Redondo Beach, California
G	32	Sean Johnson	6 ft 2 in (1.88 m)	190 lb (86 kg)	So	Queens, New York
F/C	33	Rodrigo Peggau	6 ft 8 in (2.03 m)	235 lb (107 kg)	So	São Paulo, Brazil

Head coach

- Ron Everhart (Virginia Tech)

Assistant coach(es)

- Steve Hall (Virginia Tech)
- Greg Gary (Tulane)
- Rodney Crawford (Cincinnati)

Legend

- (C) Team captain
- (S) Suspended
- (I) Ineligible
- (W) Walk-on
- Injured
- Current redshirt

Roster
Last update: January 24, 2023

== Schedule and results ==
Date time, TV	Rank^{#}	Opponent^{#}	Result	Record	Site (attendance) city, state
Exhibition
October 30, 2010*; 7:00 pm		La Roche	W 100–53	—	A. J. Palumbo Center; Pittsburgh, PA
November 8, 2010*; 7:00 pm		Lycoming	W 118–65	—	A. J. Palumbo Center; Pittsburgh, PA
Regular season
November 13, 2010*; 7:00 pm		Bluefield State	W 110–67	1–0	A. J. Palumbo Center (2,472); Pittsburgh, PA
November 19, 2010*; 7:00 pm		at Robert Morris	L 63–69	1–1	Charles L. Sewall Center (1,846); Moon Township, PA
November 22, 2010*; 7:00 pm		at Bowling Green	W 90–54	2–1	Stroh Center (1,214); Bowling Green, OH
November 27, 2010*; 7:00 pm		UMBC	W 101–69	3–1	A. J. Palumbo Center (2015); Pittsburgh, PA
December 1, 2010*; 9:00 pm, ESPNU		vs. No. 3 Pittsburgh	L 66–80	3–2	CONSOL Energy Center (12,860); Pittsburgh, PA
December 4, 2010*; 6:00 pm, BTN		at Penn State	L 73–77	3–3	Bryce Jordan Center (5,853); State College, PA
December 8, 2010*; 8:05 pm		at Green Bay	W 81–71	4–3	Resch Center (2,303); Green Bay, WI
December 12, 2010*; 7:00 pm, CBS College Sports		West Virginia	L 61–64	4–4	CONSOL Energy Center (8,059); Pittsburgh, PA
December 18, 2010*; 7:00 pm		IUPUI	W 81–54	5–4	A. J. Palumbo Center (2,025); Pittsburgh, PA
December 22, 2010*; 8:00 pm		George Mason	L 79–85 ^{2OT}	5–5	A. J. Palumbo Center (2,107); Pittsburgh, PA
December 31, 2010*; 4:00 pm		Northwestern State	W 91–64	6–5	A. J. Palumbo Center (1,878); Pittsburgh, PA
January 2, 2011*; 4:00 pm		Norfolk State	W 95–73	7–5	A. J. Palumbo Center (1,914); Pittsburgh, PA
January 5, 2011; 7:00 pm		at Saint Joseph's	W 75–63	8–5 (1–0)	Hagan Arena (3,662); Philadelphia, PA
January 8, 2011*; 8:35 pm		at Houston Baptist	W 81–64	9–5	Sharp Gymnasium (648); Houston, TX
January 12, 2011; 7:00 pm		Saint Louis	W 67–45	10–5 (2–0)	A. J. Palumbo Center (2,422); Pittsburgh, PA
January 15, 2011; 12:00 pm, CBS College Sports		No. 19 Temple	W 78–66	11–5 (3–0)	A. J. Palumbo Center (3,506); Pittsburgh, PA
January 19, 2011; 7:00 pm		at La Salle	W 88–71	12–5 (4–0)	Tom Gola Arena (1,806); Philadelphia, PA
January 22, 2011; 2:00 pm, CBS College Sports		Charlotte	W 83–67	13–5 (5–0)	A. J. Palumbo Center (3,687); Pittsburgh, PA
January 26, 2011; 7:00 pm		at Fordham	W 91–72	14–5 (6–0)	Rose Hill Gymnasium (1,384); The Bronx, NY
January 30, 2011; 2:00 pm		Dayton	W 82–64	15–5 (7–0)	CONSOL Energy Center (8,802); Pittsburgh, PA
February 2, 2011; 7:00 pm		George Washington	W 84–59	16–5 (8–0)	A. J. Palumbo Center (3,016); Pittsburgh, PA
February 5, 2011; 7:00 pm		at St. Bonaventure	L 62–64	16–6 (8–1)	Reilly Center (4,157); St. Bonaventure, NY
February 13, 2011; 2:00 pm, FS Ohio		Xavier; Chuck Cooper Classic	L 63–71	16–7 (8–2)	CONSOL Energy Center (10,509); Pittsburgh, PA
February 16, 2011; 7:00 pm		at UMass	W 81–63	17–7 (9–2)	Mullins Center (2,453); Amherst, MA
February 19, 2011; 12:00 pm, CBS College Sports		at Dayton	L 63–64	17–8 (9–3)	UD Arena (13,110); Dayton, OH
February 23, 2011; 7:00 pm		Rhode Island	L 76–77	17–9 (9–4)	A. J. Palumbo Center (3,035); Pittsburgh, PA
February 26, 2011; 8:00 pm		at Saint Louis	L 51–62	17–10 (9–5)	Chaifetz Arena (7,438); St. Louis, MO
March 2, 2011; 7:00 pm		St. Bonaventure	W 70–64	18–10 (10–5)	A. J. Palumbo Center (3,032); Pittsburgh, PA
March 5, 2011; 12:00 pm, CBS College Sports		at Richmond	L 56–68	18–11 (10–6)	Robins Center (6,524); Richmond, VA
Atlantic 10 tournament
March 11, 2011; 2:30 pm	(4)	vs. (12) Saint Joseph's; A-10 Quarterfinals	L 90–93 ^{OT}	18–12	Boardwalk Hall (5,354); Atlantic City, NJ
CBI
March 16, 2011; 9:00 pm		at Montana; CBI First Round	W 87–76	19–12	Dahlberg Arena (2,830); Missoula, MT
March 21, 2011; 10:00 pm		at Oregon; CBI Quarterfinals	L 75–77	19–13	Matthew Knight Arena (5,369); Eugene, OR
*Non-conference game. ^{#}Rankings from AP Poll. (#) Tournament seedings in parentheses. All times are in Eastern Time.
