= 2010–11 Dayton Flyers men's basketball team =

American college basketball season

2010–11 Dayton Flyers men's basketball

NIT, First Round
- Conference: Atlantic 10 Conference
- Record: 22–14 (7–9 A-10)
- Head coach: Brian Gregory (8th season)
- Assistant coaches: Billy Schmidt; Cornell Mann; Jon Borovich
- Home arena: University of Dayton Arena

2010–11 Atlantic 10 men's basketball standings
| | Conf. | | | | Overall |
| Team | W | | L | PCT | W | | L | PCT |
|---|---|---|---|---|---|---|---|---|
| No. 20 Xavier | 15 | – | 1 | .938 | 24 | – | 8 | .750 |
| Temple | 14 | – | 2 | .875 | 26 | – | 8 | .765 |
| Richmond † | 13 | – | 3 | .813 | 29 | – | 8 | .784 |
| Duquesne | 10 | – | 6 | .625 | 19 | – | 13 | .594 |
| George Washington | 10 | – | 6 | .625 | 17 | – | 14 | .548 |
| Rhode Island | 9 | – | 7 | .563 | 20 | – | 14 | .588 |
| St. Bonaventure | 8 | – | 8 | .500 | 16 | – | 15 | .516 |
| Dayton | 7 | – | 9 | .438 | 22 | – | 14 | .611 |
| UMass | 7 | – | 9 | .438 | 15 | – | 15 | .500 |
| La Salle | 6 | – | 10 | .375 | 15 | – | 18 | .455 |
| Saint Louis | 6 | – | 10 | .375 | 12 | – | 19 | .387 |
| Saint Joseph's | 4 | – | 12 | .250 | 11 | – | 22 | .333 |
| Charlotte | 2 | – | 14 | .125 | 10 | – | 20 | .333 |
| Fordham | 1 | – | 15 | .063 | 7 | – | 21 | .250 |
† 2011 Atlantic 10 Tournament winner As of March 25, 2011; Rankings from AP Poll

The 2010–11 Dayton Flyers men's basketball team represented the University of Dayton in the 2010–11 college basketball season. This was head coach Brian Gregory's eighth season at Dayton. The Flyers compete in the Atlantic 10 Conference and played their home games at the University of Dayton Arena. They finished the season 22–14, 7–9 in A-10 play and lost the championship game of the 2011 Atlantic 10 men's basketball tournament, which hurt their chances to get to the 2011 NCAA Men's Division I Basketball Tournament. Instead they were invited to the 2011 National Invitation Tournament which they lost in the first round.

== Incoming recruits ==
College recruiting information
| Name | Hometown | School | Height | Weight | Commit date |
|---|---|---|---|---|---|
| Juwan Staten; PG | Dayton, OH | Oak Hill Academy | 6 ft 0 in (1.83 m) | 160 lb (73 kg) | Feb 27, 2008 |
| Juwan Staten; PG | Recruit ratings: Scout: Rivals: ESPN: | | | | |
| Brandon Spearman; SG | Chicago, IL | Simeon Academy | 6 ft 3 in (1.91 m) | 185 lb (84 kg) | Jul 17, 2009 |
| Brandon Spearman; SG | Recruit ratings: Scout: Rivals: ESPN: | | | | |
| Devin Oliver; SF | Kalamazoo, MI | Kalamazoo Central High School | 6 ft 5 in (1.96 m) | 195 lb (88 kg) | Oct 18, 2009 |
| Devin Oliver; SF | Recruit ratings: Scout: Rivals: ESPN: | | | | |
| Ralph Hill; SF | Westerville, OH | Westerville North High School | 6 ft 6 in (1.98 m) | 210 lb (95 kg) | Apr 28, 2009 |
| Ralph Hill; SF | Recruit ratings: Scout: Rivals: ESPN: | | | | |
Overall recruit ranking:
Note: In many cases, Scout, Rivals, 247Sports, On3, and ESPN may conflict in their listings of height and weight.; In these cases, the average was taken. ESPN grades are on a 100-point scale.; Sources: "2010 Team Ranking". Rivals.

== Roster ==
| # | Name | Height | Weight (lbs.) | Position | Class | Hometown | Previous Team(s) |
|---|---|---|---|---|---|---|---|
| 3 | Juwan Staten | 6'0" | 189 | G | Fr. | Dayton, Ohio | Oak Hill Acad. |
| 4 | Chris Johnson | 6'6" | 201 | F | Jr. | Columbus, Ohio | Brookhaven HS |
| 5 | Devin Oliver | 6'7" | 200 | G | Fr. | Kalamazoo, Michigan | Kalamazoo Central HS |
| 12 | Josh Parker | 6'0" | 186 | F | RS Jr. | Harvey, Illinois | Thornton Township HS |
| 21 | Brian Vonderhaar | 6'0" | 170 | G | So. | Cincinnati, Ohio | Moeller HS |
| 22 | Paul Williams | 6'4" | 212 | G | Jr. | Detroit, Michigan | Renaissance HS |
| 23 | Luke Fabrizius | 6'9" | 228 | F | Jr. | Arlington Heights, Illinois | John Hersey HS |
| 25 | Logan Nourse | 6'1" | 178 | G | Sr. | Spencerville, Ohio | Spencerville HS |
| 32 | Brandon Spearman | 6'3" | 194 | G | Fr. | Chicago, Illinois | Simeon HS |
| 33 | Chris Wright | 6'8" | 226 | F | Sr. | Trotwood, Ohio | Trotwood-Madison HS |
| 34 | Devin Searcy | 6'10" | 226 | F/C | Sr. | Romulus, Michigan | Romulus HS |
| 35 | Matt Kavanaugh | 6'9" | 250 | F/C | So. | Centerville, Ohio | Centerville HS |
| 40 | Peter Zestermann | 6'8" | 219 | F/C | Sr. | Cincinnati, Ohio | St. Xavier HS |
| 44 | Josh Benson | 6'9" | 215 | F/C | RS So. | Dayton, Ohio | Dunbar HS |
| 50 | Ralph Hill | 6'6" | 210 | F | Fr. | Westerville, Ohio | Westerville HS |
| 52 | Mitch Asmus | 6'5" | 195 | F | Fr. | Okemos, Michigan | Okemos HS |
| | Kevin Dillard | 6'0" | 170 | G | RS So. | Homewood, Illinois | Homewood-Flossmoor HS |

== Schedule and results ==
- All times are Eastern

| Date time, TV | Rank^{#} | Opponent^{#} | Result | Record | Site (attendance) city, state |
Exhibition
| 11/01/2010*; 7:00 pm | | Grand Valley State | W 77–66 | – | UD Arena (10,865); Dayton, OH |
| 11/06/2010*; 7:00 pm | | Findlay | W 85–68 | – | UD Arena (12,338); Dayton, OH |
Regular Season
| 11/13/2010*; 2:00 pm | | Mount St. Mary's | W 67–52 | 1–0 | UD Arena (12,611); Dayton, OH |
| 11/16/2010*; 9:00 pm, FSOH | | Akron | W 76–68 | 2–0 | UD Arena (12,377); Dayton, OH |
| 11/20/2010*; 7:00 pm | | at Ole Miss | W 78–71 | 3–0 | Tad Smith Coliseum (6,436); Biloxi, MS |
| 11/22/2010*; 7:00 pm | | Savannah State | W 61–59 | 4–0 | UD Arena (12,153); Dayton, OH |
| 11/24/2010*; 7:00 pm, ESPN3 | | Florida A&M | W 80–60 | 5–0 | UD Arena (11,863); Dayton, OH |
| 11/27/2010*; 7:00 pm, ESPN3 | | vs. Cincinnati | L 34–68 | 5–1 | U.S. Bank Arena (6,016); Cincinnati, OH |
| 12/01/2010*; 7:00 pm, WHIO | | East Tennessee State | L 68–73 | 5–2 | UD Arena (12,040); Dayton, OH |
| 12/04/2010*; 8:00 pm, WHIO | | Miami (OH) | W 70–58 | 6–2 | UD Arena (13,435); Dayton, OH |
| 12/07/2010*; 7:00 pm, FSOH | | Central Connecticut | W 63–61 | 7–2 | UD Arena (12,063); Dayton, OH |
| 12/11/2010*; 4:00 pm, WHIO | | at Old Dominion | L 71–74 | 7–3 | Ted Constant Convocation Center (7,563); Norfolk, VA |
| 12/18/2010*; 7:00 pm, WHIO | | Western Carolina | W 71–60 | 8–3 | UD Arena (12,338); Dayton, OH |
| 12/20/2010*; 7:00 pm | | Winthrop | W 73–58 | 9–3 | UD Arena (11,974); Dayton, OH |
| 12/22/2010*; 7:00 pm, ESPN3 | | at Seton Hall | W 69–65 | 10–3 | Prudential Center (7,162); Newark, NJ |
| 12/29/2010*; 7:00 pm, FSOH | | George Mason | W 73–67 | 11–3 | UD Arena (13,371); Dayton, OH |
| 01/01/2011*; 2:00 pm, CBSCS | | New Mexico | W 76–73 ^{2OT} | 12–3 | UD Arena (12,804); Dayton, OH |
| 01/05/2011; 8:00 pm, CBSCS | | at Saint Louis | W 60–50 | 13–3 (1–0) | Chaifetz Arena (7,621); St. Louis, MO |
| 01/09/2011; 2:00 pm, CBSCS | | at UMass | L 50–58 | 13–4 (1–1) | Mullins Center (3,645); Amherst, MA |
| 01/12/2011; 7:00 pm, WHIO | | Saint Joseph's | W 65–59 | 14–4 (2–1) | UD Arena (11,846); Dayton, OH |
| 01/15/2011; 8:00 pm, CBSCS | | at Xavier | L 76–81 | 14–5 (2–2) | Cintas Center (10,250); Cincinnati, OH |
| 01/22/2011; 7:00 pm, WHIO | | Fordham | W 91–57 | 15–5 (3–2) | UD Arena (13,031); Dayton, OH |
| 01/25/2011; 7:00 pm, ESPNU | | Richmond | L 60–71 | 15–6 (3–3) | UD Arena (12,126); Dayton, OH |
| 01/30/2011; 2:00 pm | | at Duquesne | L 64–82 | 15–7 (3–4) | CONSOL Energy Center (8,802); Pittsburgh, PA |
| 02/02/2011; 9:00 pm, FSOH | | St. Bonaventure | W 63–61 | 16–7 (4–4) | UD Arena (12,426); Dayton, Ohio |
| 02/05/2011; 6:00 pm, CBSCS | | at La Salle | W 85–81 | 17–7 (5–4) | Tom Gola Arena (2,308); Philadelphia, PA |
| 02/09/2011; 7:00 pm, WHIO | | at Rhode Island | L 53–67 | 17–8 (5–5) | Ryan Center (5,415); Kingston, RI |
| 02/12/2011; 1:00 pm, ESPNU | | No. 24 Temple | L 63–75 | 17–9 (5–6) | UD Arena (13,117); Dayton, OH |
| 02/16/2011; 7:00 pm | | at Charlotte | W 69–51 | 18–9 (6–6) | Dale F. Halton Arena (5,140); Charlotte, NC |
| 02/19/2011; 12:00 pm, WHIO | | Duquesne | W 64–63 | 19–9 (7–6) | UD Arena (13,110); Dayton, OH |
| 02/27/2011; 1:00 pm, ESPN2 | | No. 25 Xavier | L 62–66 | 19–10 (7–7) | UD Arena (13,435); Dayton, OH |
| 03/02/2011; 7:00 pm, WHIO | | Saint Louis | L 51–69 | 19–11 (7–8) | UD Arena (12,658); Dayton, OH |
| 03/05/2011; 2:00 pm, WHIO | | at George Washington | L 58–60 | 19–12 (7–9) | Charles E. Smith Athletic Center (3,315); Washington, D.C. |
2011 Atlantic 10 men's basketball tournament
| 03/08/2011; 9:00 pm, CBSCS | (9) | at (8) UMass; A-10 First Round | W 78–50 | 20–12 | Mullins Center (2,264); Amherst, MA |
| 03/11/2011; 12:00 pm, CBSCS | (9) | vs. (1) No. 18 Xavier; A-10 Quarterfinals | W 68–67 | 21–12 | Boardwalk Hall (5,354); Atlantic City, NJ |
| 03/12/2011; 1:00 pm, CBSCS | (9) | vs. (12) Saint Joseph's; A-10 Semifinals | W 64–61 | 22–12 | Boardwalk Hall (N/A); Atlantic City, NJ |
| 03/13/2011; 1:00 pm, CBS | (9) | vs. (3) Richmond; A-10 Championship Game | L 54–67 | 22–13 | Boardwalk Hall (5,602); Atlantic City, NJ |
2011 National Invitation Tournament
| 03/15/2011; 7:00 pm, ESPN2 | (3 VT) | at (6 VT) College of Charleston; NIT First Round | L 84–94 | 22–14 | TD Arena (4,717); Charleston, SC |
*Non-conference game. ^{#}Rankings from AP Poll. (#) Tournament seedings in parentheses. VT=NIT Virginia Tech bracket.
