= 2010–11 St. Bonaventure Bonnies men's basketball team =

American college basketball season

2010–11 St. Bonaventure Bonnies men's basketball
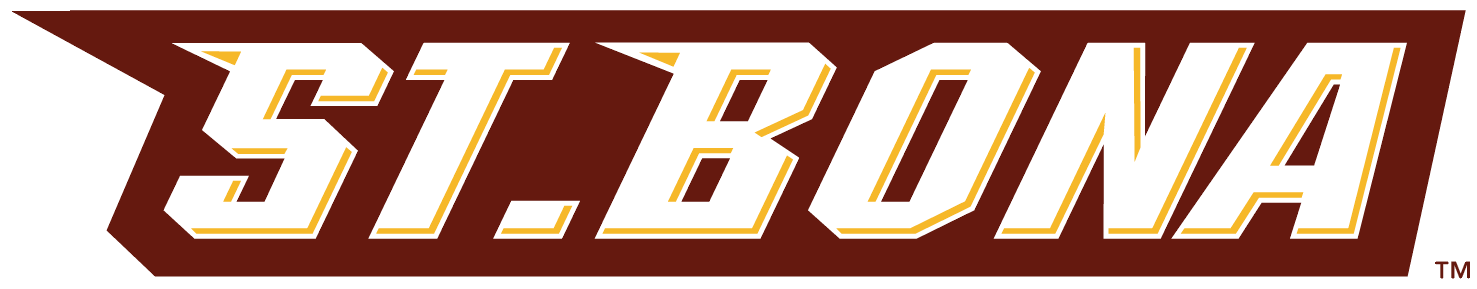

CBI, First round
- Conference: Atlantic 10 Conference
- Record: 16–15 (8–8 A-10)
- Head coach: Mark Schmidt (4th season)
- Assistant coaches: Jeff Massey (4th season); Dave Moore (4th season); Steve Curran (1st season)
- Home arena: Reilly Center

2010–11 Atlantic 10 men's basketball standings
	Conf.				Overall
Team	W		L	PCT	W		L	PCT
No. 20 Xavier	15	–	1	.938	24	–	8	.750
Temple	14	–	2	.875	26	–	8	.765
Richmond †	13	–	3	.813	29	–	8	.784
Duquesne	10	–	6	.625	19	–	13	.594
George Washington	10	–	6	.625	17	–	14	.548
Rhode Island	9	–	7	.563	20	–	14	.588
St. Bonaventure	8	–	8	.500	16	–	15	.516
Dayton	7	–	9	.438	22	–	14	.611
UMass	7	–	9	.438	15	–	15	.500
La Salle	6	–	10	.375	15	–	18	.455
Saint Louis	6	–	10	.375	12	–	19	.387
Saint Joseph's	4	–	12	.250	11	–	22	.333
Charlotte	2	–	14	.125	10	–	20	.333
Fordham	1	–	15	.063	7	–	21	.250
† 2011 Atlantic 10 Tournament winner As of March 25, 2011; Rankings from AP Poll

The 2010–11 St. Bonaventure Bonnies men's basketball team represented St. Bonaventure University in the 2010–11 NCAA Division I men's basketball season. The Bonnies, led by head coach Mark Schmidt, played their home games at the Reilly Center in Olean, New York, as members of the Atlantic 10 Conference. The Bonnies finished seventh in the Atlantic 10 during the regular season, and were upset in the first round of the A10 tournament by La Salle.

St. Bonaventure failed to qualify for the NCAA tournament, but were invited to the 2011 College Basketball Invitational. The Bonnies were eliminated in the first round of the CBI in a loss to UCF, 69–54.

== Roster ==
2010–11 St. Bonaventure Bonnies men's basketball team
Players
Coaches

Pos.	#	Name	Height	Weight	Year	Hometown
G	0	Ogo Adegboye	6 ft 1 in (1.85 m)	—	Sr	London, England
G	1	Sam de Haas	6 ft 4 in (1.93 m)	—	Fr	Den Bosch, Netherlands
G	5	Jamil Goodwin	6 ft 4 in (1.93 m)	—	So	Bloomfield, New Jersey
G/F	11	Demitrius Conger	6 ft 6 in (1.98 m)	—	So	Brooklyn, New York
G	24	Matthew Wright	6 ft 4 in (1.93 m)	—	Fr	Toronto, Ontario, Canada
G	32	Michael Davenport	6 ft 5 in (1.96 m)	—	Jr	Cincinnati, Ohio
F	33	Marquise Simmons	6 ft 8 in (2.03 m)	—	RS So	Capitol Heights, Maryland
F	35	Brett Roseboro	6 ft 10 in (2.08 m)	—	So	Quakertown, Pennsylvania
F	43	Da'Quan Cook	6 ft 8 in (2.03 m)	—	RS Jr	Elizabeth, New Jersey
F	44	Andrew Nicholson	6 ft 9 in (2.06 m)	—	Jr	Mississauga, Ontario, Canada
F/C	45	Jake Houseknecht	6 ft 9 in (2.06 m)	—	RS So	Olean, New York

Head coach

- Mark Schmidt (Boston College)

Assistant coach(es)

- Jeff Massey (Xavier)
- Dave Moore (Bethel (TN))
- Steve Curran (Merrimack)

Legend

- (C) Team captain
- (S) Suspended
- (I) Ineligible
- (W) Walk-on
- Injured
- Current redshirt

Roster
Last update: January 30, 2023

== Schedule and results ==
Date time, TV	Rank^{#}	Opponent^{#}	Result	Record	Site (attendance) city, state
Exhibition
November 5, 2010*; 7:00 pm		Mansfield	W 82–65	—	Reilly Center; St. Bonaventure, NY
Regular season
November 12, 2010*; 8:30 pm		at Canisius	L 70–80	0–1	Koessler Center (2,196); Buffalo, NY
November 14, 2010*; 2:00 pm		Arkansas–Little Rock	W 77–64	1–1	Reilly Center (2,809); St. Bonaventure, NY
November 19, 2010*; 7:00 pm		at Cornell	W 56–54	2–1	Newman Arena (3,081); Ithaca, NY
November 21, 2010*; 2:00 pm		at Binghamton	W 69–44	3–1	Binghamton University Events Center (3,502); Vestal, NY
November 27, 2010*; 6:00 pm		at Cleveland State	L 51–69	3–2	Wolstein Center (2,214); Cleveland, OH
December 4, 2010*; 7:00 pm		Buffalo	W 76–74	4–2	Reilly Center (4,165); St. Bonaventure, NY
December 7, 2010*; 7:00 pm		at St. John's	W 67–66	5–2	Carnesecca Arena (4,408); Queens, NY
December 11, 2010*; 4:00 pm		Niagara	L 61–69	5–3	Reilly Center (4,022); St. Bonaventure, NY
December 18, 2010*; 2:00 pm		Ohio	W 112–107 ^{4OT}	6–3	Reilly Center (3,053); St. Bonaventure, NY
December 23, 2010*; 7:00 pm		vs. Virginia Tech	L 68–76 ^{OT}	6–4	Blue Cross Arena (5,285); Rochester, NY
December 28, 2010*; 7:00 pm		Siena	W 82–79	7–4	Reilly Center (3,679); St. Bonaventure, NY
January 2, 2011*; 4:00 pm		Marshall	L 65–74	7–5	Reilly Center (3,229); St. Bonaventure, NY
January 5, 2011*; 7:00 pm		at Arkansas–Little Rock	W 68–55	8–5	Jack Stephens Center (2,358); Little Rock, AR
January 8, 2011; 4:00 pm, MASN		Charlotte	W 92–88 ^{3OT}	9–5 (1–0)	Reilly Center (3,438); St. Bonaventure, NY
January 12, 2011; 7:30 pm		at No. 19 Temple	L 55–83	9–6 (1–1)	Liacouras Center (3,213); Philadelphia, PA
January 16, 2011; 4:00 pm, CBS College Sports		at Rhode Island	L 55–56	9–7 (1–2)	Ryan Center (4,421); Kingston, RI
January 19, 2011; 7:00 pm, CBS College Sports		Xavier	L 65–79	9–8 (1–3)	Reilly Center (4,244); St. Bonaventure, NY
January 22, 2011; 2:00 pm		at George Washington	W 62–49	10–8 (2–3)	Charles E. Smith Center (3,136); Washington, D.C.
January 26, 2011; 7:00 pm		UMass	L 69–78	10–9 (2–4)	Reilly Center (3,332); St. Bonaventure, NY
January 29, 2011; 1:00 pm		at Fordham	W 69–60	11–9 (3–4)	Rose Hill Gymnasium (3,200); The Bronx, NY
February 2, 2011; 9:00 pm, Fox Sports Ohio		at Dayton	L 61–63	11–10 (3–5)	UD Arena (12,426); Dayton, OH
February 5, 2011; 7:00 pm		Duquesne	W 64–62	12–10 (4–5)	Reilly Center (4,157); St. Bonaventure, NY
February 12, 2011; 4:00 pm		La Salle	W 82–61	13–10 (5–5)	Reilly Center (4,581); St. Bonaventure, NY
February 16, 2011; 7:00 pm		Saint Louis	W 83–73	14–10 (6–5)	Reilly Center (3,264); St. Bonaventure, NY
February 20, 2011; 3:00 pm, CBS College Sports		at Richmond	L 65–82	14–11 (6–6)	Robins Center (7,291); Richmond, VA
February 23, 2011; 7:00 pm		Fordham	W 82–63	15–11 (7–6)	Reilly Center (3,457); St. Bonaventure, NY
February 26, 2011; 4:00 pm		at Saint Joseph's	L 65–79	15–12 (7–7)	Hagan Arena (4,051); Philadelphia, PA
March 2, 2011; 7:00 pm		at Duquesne	L 64–70	15–13 (7–8)	A. J. Palumbo Center (3,032); Pittsburgh, PA
March 5, 2011; 2:00 pm, CBS College Sports		Rhode Island	W 74–68	16–13 (8–8)	Reilly Center (3,829); St. Bonaventure, NY
Atlantic 10 tournament
March 8, 2011; 5:00 pm, CBS College Sports	(7)	(10) La Salle; A10 First Round	L 73–75 ^{2OT}	16–14	Reilly Center (3,453); St. Bonaventure, NY
CBI
March 15, 2011; 8:00 pm		at UCF; CBI First Round	L 54–69	16–15	Addition Financial Arena (2,945); Orlando, FL
*Non-conference game. ^{#}Rankings from AP Poll. (#) Tournament seedings in parentheses. All times are in Eastern Time.
