= 2010–11 Kansas Jayhawks men's basketball team =

American college basketball season

2010–11 Kansas Jayhawks men's basketball

Big 12 tournament champions Big 12 regular season champions

NCAA tournament, Elite Eight
- Conference: Big 12
- North

Ranking
- Coaches: No. 4
- AP: No. 2
- Record: 35–3 (14–2 Big 12)
- Head coach: Bill Self (8th season)
- Assistant coaches: Joe Dooley (8th season); Danny Manning (4th season); Kurtis Townsend (7th season)
- Captains: Mario Little; Brady Morningstar; Tyrel Reed
- Home arena: Allen Fieldhouse

2010–11 Big 12 men's basketball standings
	Conf.				Overall
Team	W		L	PCT	W		L	PCT
No. 2 Kansas †	14	–	2	.875	35	–	3	.921
No. 8 Texas	13	–	3	.813	28	–	8	.778
No. 24 Texas A&M	10	–	6	.625	24	–	9	.727
No. 21 Kansas State	10	–	6	.625	23	–	11	.676
Colorado	8	–	8	.500	24	–	14	.632
Missouri	8	–	8	.500	23	–	11	.676
Baylor	7	–	9	.438	18	–	13	.581
Nebraska	7	–	9	.438	19	–	13	.594
Oklahoma State	6	–	10	.375	20	–	14	.588
Oklahoma	5	–	11	.313	14	–	18	.438
Texas Tech	5	–	11	.313	13	–	19	.406
Iowa State	3	–	13	.188	16	–	16	.500
† 2011 Big 12 Tournament winner Rankings from AP poll

The 2010–11 Kansas Jayhawks men's basketball team represented the University of Kansas in the 2010–11 NCAA Division I men's basketball season, which was the Jayhawks' 113th basketball season. The head coach was Bill Self, who was serving his 8th year. The team played its home games in Allen Fieldhouse in Lawrence, Kansas and are members of the Big 12 Conference. They finished the season 35–3, 14–2 in Big 12 play to claim the regular season conference title. They were also champions of the 2011 Big 12 men's basketball tournament. They earned a #1 seed in the Southwest Region in the 2011 NCAA Division I men's basketball tournament, where they defeated Boston University in the second round and Illinois in the third round to advance to the Sweet Sixteen. They defeated Richmond to advance to the Elite Eight where they were upset by VCU.

== Pre-season ==
=== Departures ===
Sherron Collins finished his senior year at Kansas and graduated in 2010. Junior center Cole Aldrich announced his intention to enter the NBA draft on March 29, 2010, and Xavier Henry announced his intention to enter the NBA draft on April 7, 2010. In mid-August coach Self announced, via press release, the departures of walk-ons C.J. Henry and Chase Buford. According to Self, Henry notified the coaching staff in late July of his intention to transfer to another university where he would continue his collegiate basketball career. Coach Self said that would-be senior Chase Buford would not return to the team in the fall in order to focus on academics.

=== Recruiting ===
Bill Self heavily courted three guards for the 2010–2011 season and landed the biggest one there was in the form of Josh Selby of Baltimore, MD. Selby committed on April 17 and was expected to fill the hole left by all-star guard Sherron Collins. Selby was rated as the #1 overall recruit in the 2010 class by Rivals.com. Shooting guard Royce Woolridge of Phoenix, AZrizona, who committed to Kansas in 2009, also joined the team in the fall as a freshman and ranked in Rivals.com's Top 150 recruit list as well.

Zach Peters of Plano, Texas, made an early verbal commitment to Kansas on April 21 for the 2012–2013 season. The 6-foot-9, 235-pound forward was still in his sophomore year at the time. He chose Kansas over his three other choices: Texas, Kentucky and North Carolina.

On October 12, 4-star point guard Naadir Tharpe signed a letter of intent to join the Jayhawks as a freshman for the 2011–12 season. The 6-foot prep all-star chose Kansas after withdrawing from Providence.

==== Class of 2010 ====
College recruiting
Name	Hometown	School	Height	Weight	Commit date
Josh Selby; PG	Baltimore, Maryland	Lake Clifton HS	6 ft 2 in (1.88 m)	182 lb (83 kg)	Apr 17, 2010
Josh Selby; PG	Recruit ratings: Scout: Rivals: ESPN: (97)				
Royce Woolridge; SG	Phoenix, Arizona	Sunnyslope HS	6 ft 3 in (1.91 m)	175 lb (79 kg)	May 1, 2008
Royce Woolridge; SG	Recruit ratings: Scout: Rivals: ESPN: (93)				
Overall Recruiting Rankings: Scout – UR Rivals – 23 ESPN – 23

Transfers

College recruiting
Name	Hometown	School	Height	Weight	Commit date
Justin Wesley; PF	Fort Worth, TX	Klein Collins HS / Lamar University	6 ft 9 in (2.06 m)	220 lb (100 kg)	
Justin Wesley; PF	Recruit ratings: No ratings found				

=== Accolades ===
Team

- The Sporting News preseason #4 team.
- Athlon Sports preseason #4 team.
- Blue Ribbon Yearbook preseason #7 team.
- Big 12 Conference preseason #2 team.
- USA Today Coaches Poll #7 team.
- Associated Press Poll #7 team.

Marcus Morris

- Blue Ribbon Yearbook preseason first team All-American.
- John R. Wooden Award candidate.
- All-Big 12 First Team

Josh Selby

- Big 12 Preseason Freshman of the Year.
- All-Big 12 Team Honorable Mention
- Lindy's Preseason Freshman of the Year
- Rivals.com Preseason Freshman of the Year

Tyshawn Taylor

- All-Big 12 Team Honorable Mention

== Season summary ==
=== Highlights ===
- The Jayhawks broke the KU home court winning streak record of 62 straight with their 63rd home win in a row over Texas A&M-CC on Nov. 23rd, 2010. The streak ended at 69 straight home wins with a defeat to Texas on January 22, 2011. The streak was the longest in NCAA basketball since 1992.
- On December 10, David & Suzanne Booth purchased Dr. James Naismith's 13 Original Rules of the game at a Sotheby's auction in New York City for the sum of $4.3 million. They intend to bring the founding document of basketball back to Lawrence, KS., where it will likely be housed inside Allen Fieldhouse.
- Josh Selby's debut with the Jayhawks on December 18 proved to be worth the buzz, with 21 points, including the game-winning 3 pointer to beat USC 70–68.
- On January 15, Marcus Morris became the 53rd player in Jayhawks history to score 1000 career points. The victory over Nebraska set a program record of 69 consecutive home wins.
- With a win over Texas A&M on March 2, the Jayhawks clinched their 7th consecutive Big 12 title and an NCAA record-extending 54th overall.
- With a win over Texas on March 12, the Jayhawks won their 8th Big 12 Conference tournament Championship, 25th overall conference tournament championship all-time. The win also officially clinched a berth in the NCAA tournament.
- On March 13, the NCAA Selection Committee named Kansas a #1 seed for the 10th time in school history. They would face 16 seed Boston University on Friday March 18.
- Reserve forward Thomas Robinson (basketball) made national headlines when, in less than a month's time, his grandparents and mother all died, leaving his sister, Jayla, an orphan. The NCAA granted waivers to the University of Kansas to provide assistance to Thomas and Jayla, enabling Thomas to make sure his sister was cared for while he was still in college.

=== Awards ===
Bill Self

- Big 12 Coach of the Year
- Associated Press Big 12 Coach of the Year
- USBWA District VI Coach of the Year

Marcus Morris

- Big 12 Player of the Year
- All-Big 12 First Team
- Associated Press Second Team All-American
- Associated Press Big 12 Player of the Year
- Associated Press All-Big 12 First Team (unanimous)
- Big 12 Tournament Most Outstanding Player
- Yahoo! Sports First Team All-American
- USBWA Second Team All-American
- USBWA District VI Player of the Year
- USBWA All-District VI Team
- NABC Second Team All-American
- NABC All-District 8 First Team
- The Sporting News Second Team All-American
- John R. Wooden Award All-American (top 10 finalist)
- Naismith Award midseason list (top 30)
- Oscar Robertson Trophy finalist (top 10)
- Big 12 Player of the Week (Nov. 29)
- Big 12 Player of the Week (Jan. 17)
- Big 12 Player of the Week (Feb. 14)

Markieff Morris

- All-Big 12 Second Team
- Associated Press All-Big 12 Second Team
- Yahoo! Sports All-America Honorable Mention
- USBWA All-District VI Team
- NABC All-District 8 Second Team
- Big 12 Player of the Week (Dec. 27)

Josh Selby

- Big 12 Rookie of the Week (Dec. 20)
- Big 12 Rookie of the Week (Jan. 31)

Tyshawn Taylor

- Bob Cousy Award finalist (top 20)

Tyrel Reed

- All-Big 12 Honorable Mention
- Associated Press All-Big 12 Honorable Mention
- Lowe's Senior CLASS Award finalist (top 10)
- CoSIDA First Team Academic All-American.
- Capital One Academic All-American First Team
- Capital One Academic All-District 7 team
- Academic All-Big 12 First Team

Brady Morningstar

- Big 12 All Defensive Team
- All-Big 12 Honorable Mention
- Academic All-Big 12 Second Team

Thomas Robinson

- V Foundation Comeback Award finalist

== Roster ==
2010–11 Kansas Jayhawks men's basketball team
Players
Coaches

Pos.	#	Name	Height	Weight	Year	Hometown
F	0	Thomas Robinson	6 ft 9 in (2.06 m)	237 lb (108 kg)	So	Washington, District of Columbia
G	2	Conner Teahan (redshirt)	6 ft 5 in (1.96 m)	210 lb (95 kg)	Sr	Leawood, Kansas
F	4	Justin Wesley (I)	6 ft 8 in (2.03 m)	200 lb (91 kg)	So	Fort Worth, Texas
C	5	Jeff Withey	7 ft 0 in (2.13 m)	235 lb (107 kg)	RS So	San Diego, California
G	10	Tyshawn Taylor	6 ft 3 in (1.91 m)	185 lb (84 kg)	Jr	Hoboken, New Jersey
G	11	Royce Woolridge	6 ft 3 in (1.91 m)	182 lb (83 kg)	Fr	Phoenix, Arizona
G	12	Brady Morningstar	6 ft 4 in (1.93 m)	185 lb (84 kg)	RS Sr	Lawrence, Kansas
G	14	Tyrel Reed	6 ft 4 in (1.93 m)	193 lb (88 kg)	Sr	Burlington, Kansas
G	15	Elijah Johnson	6 ft 4 in (1.93 m)	195 lb (88 kg)	So	North Las Vegas, Nevada
G	20	Niko Roberts	5 ft 11 in (1.8 m)	175 lb (79 kg)	Fr	Huntington, New York
C	21	Markieff Morris	6 ft 10 in (2.08 m)	245 lb (111 kg)	Jr	Philadelphia, Pennsylvania
F	22	Marcus Morris	6 ft 9 in (2.06 m)	235 lb (107 kg)	Jr	Philadelphia, Pennsylvania
G	23	Mario Little	6 ft 6 in (1.98 m)	218 lb (99 kg)	RS Sr	Chicago, Illinois
G	24	Travis Releford	6 ft 5 in (1.96 m)	207 lb (94 kg)	RS So	Shawnee Mission, Kansas
G	32	Josh Selby	6 ft 2 in (1.88 m)	201 lb (91 kg)	Fr	Baltimore, Maryland
G	40	Jordan Juenemann	6 ft 3 in (1.91 m)	195 lb (88 kg)	Jr	Hays, Kansas

Head coach

- Bill Self (Oklahoma State)

Assistant coach(es)

- Danny Manning (Kansas)
- Joe Dooley (George Washington)
- Kurtis Townsend (Western Kentucky)

Legend

- (C) Team captain
- (S) Suspended
- (I) Ineligible
- (W) Walk-on
- Injured
- Current redshirt

Roster
Last update: 2010-12-17

== Schedule ==
Date time, TV	Rank^{#}	Opponent^{#}	Result	Record	High points	High rebounds	High assists	Site (attendance) city, state
Exhibition
11/02/10*; 7:00 pm, Jayhawk Network	No. 7	Washburn	W 92–62	–	28 – Mc. Morris	8 – Mk. Morris	3 – (4 tied)	Allen Fieldhouse (16,300); Lawrence, KS
11/09/10*; 7:00 pm, Jayhawk Network	No. 7	Emporia State	W 90–59	–	14 – Mk. Morris	10 – Robinson	6 – Taylor	Allen Fieldhouse (16,300); Lawrence, KS
Regular season
11/12/10*; 7:00 pm, Jayhawk Network	No. 7	Longwood	W 113–75	1–0	18 – Mc. Morris	16 – Mk. Morris	10 – Taylor	Allen Fieldhouse (16,300); Lawrence, KS
11/15/10*; 7:00 pm, Jayhawk Network	No. 7	Valparaiso; Las Vegas Invitational	W 79–44	2–0	22 – Mc. Morris	13 – Mk. Morris	5 – Taylor	Allen Fieldhouse (16,300); Lawrence, KS
11/19/10*; 7:00 pm, Jayhawk Network	No. 7	North Texas	W 93–60	3–0	20 – Mc. Morris	10 – Robinson	10 – Morningstar	Allen Fieldhouse (16,300); Lawrence, KS
11/23/10*; 7:00 pm, Jayhawk Network	No. 6	Texas A&M–Corpus Christi; Las Vegas Invitational	W 82–41	4–0	15 – Robinson	10 – Mk. Morris	9 – Taylor	Allen Fieldhouse (16,300); Lawrence, KS
11/26/10*; 7:00 pm, Jayhawk Network	No. 6	vs. Ohio; Las Vegas Invitational Semifinals	W 98–41	5–0	26 – Mc. Morris	8 – (2 tied)	6 – Taylor	Orleans Arena; Las Vegas, NV
11/27/10*; 9:30 pm, ESPN2	No. 6	vs. Arizona; Las Vegas Invitational Championship	W 87–79	6–0	16 – Mc. Morris	9 – Mc. Morris	7 – Taylor	Orleans Arena (5,120); Las Vegas, NV
12/02/10*; 8:00 pm, ESPN2	No. 4	UCLA; Big 12/Pac-10 Hardwood Series	W 77–76	7–0	17 – (2 tied)	8 – M. Little	4 – (2 tied)	Allen Fieldhouse (16,300); Lawrence, KS
12/07/10*; 6:00 pm, ESPN	No. 4	vs. No. 13 Memphis; Jimmy V Classic	W 81–68	8–0	16 – Mk. Morris	10 – Robinson	5 – Mc. Morris	Madison Square Garden (19,391); New York City, NY
12/11/10*; 5:30 pm, ESPN2	No. 4	vs. Colorado State	W 76–55	9–0	12 – (2 tied)	11 – Mk. Morris	6 – T.Taylor	Sprint Center (18,756); Kansas City, MO
12/18/10*; 11:00 am, ESPN	No. 3	USC	W 70–68	10–0	21 – Selby	8 – Mk. Morris	5 – Reed	Allen Fieldhouse (16,300); Lawrence, KS
12/22/10*; 10:00 pm, FSN	No. 3	at California	W 78–63	11–0	21 – Mk. Morris	10 – (2 tied)	5 – T. Taylor	Haas Pavilion (11,250); Berkeley, CA
12/29/10*; 8:00 pm, ESPNU	No. 3	UT Arlington	W 82–57	12–0	20 – Robinson	16 – Robinson	5 – Johnson	Allen Fieldhouse (16,300); Lawrence, KS
01/02/11*; 5:00 pm, ESPNU	No. 3	Miami (OH)	W 83–56	13–0	20 – Mk. Morris	10 – Mk. Morris	5 – (3 tied)	Allen Fieldhouse (16,300); Lawrence, KS
01/05/11*; 7:00 pm, Jayhawk Network	No. 3	UMKC	W 99–52	14–0	16 – Selby	7 – Mc. Morris	7 – (2 tied)	Allen Fieldhouse (16,300); Lawrence, KS
01/09/11*; 3:30 pm, CBS	No. 3	at Michigan	W 67–60 ^{OT}	15–0	22 – Mc. Morris	11 – Mk. Morris	4 – (2 tied)	Crisler Arena (12,476); Ann Arbor, MI
01/12/11; 8:00 pm, ESPN2	No. 3	at Iowa State	W 84–79	16–0 (1–0)	33 – Mc. Morris	13 – Mc. Morris	4 – (2 tied)	Hilton Coliseum (12,204); Ames, IA
01/15/11; 1:00 pm, ESPNU	No. 3	Nebraska	W 63–60	17–0 (2–0)	16 – (2 Tied)	11 – Mc. Morris	3 – (2 Tied)	Allen Fieldhouse (16,300); Lawrence, KS
01/17/11; 8:30 pm, ESPN	No. 2	at Baylor	W 85–65	18–0 (3–0)	25 – Mc. Morris	9 – Mk. Morris	4 – (2 Tied)	Ferrell Center (10,284); Waco, TX
01/22/11; 3:00 pm, CBS	No. 2	No. 10 Texas	L 63–74	18–1 (3–1)	17 – Reed	7 – Mc. Morris	6 – Taylor	Allen Fieldhouse (16,300); Lawrence, KS
01/25/11; 7:00 pm, Big 12	No. 6	at Colorado	W 82–78	19–1 (4–1)	17 – Selby	15 – Mk. Morris	5 – Selby	Coors Events Center (11,203); Boulder, CO
01/29/11; 6:00 pm, ESPN	No. 6	Kansas State; Sunflower Showdown, ESPN College GameDay	W 90–66	20–1 (5–1)	20 – Mk. Morris	9 – (3 tied)	6 – Johnson	Allen Fieldhouse (16,300); Lawrence, KS
02/01/11; 8:00 pm, ESPNU	No. 2	at Texas Tech	W 88–66	21–1 (6–1)	18 – Mc. Morris	12 – Mk. Morris	4 – (2 tied)	United Spirit Arena (9,055); Lubbock, TX
02/05/11; 3:00 pm, Big 12	No. 2	at Nebraska	W 86–66	22–1 (7–1)	19 – Morningstar	7 – Mc. Morris	6 – Morningstar	Bob Devaney Sports Center (13,602); Lincoln, NE
02/07/11; 8:00 pm, ESPN	No. 2	No. 19 Missouri; Border War	W 103–86	23–1 (8–1)	22 – Mc. Morris	8 – Mc. Morris	7 – Morningstar	Allen Fieldhouse (16,300); Lawrence, KS
02/12/11; 3:00 pm, Big 12	No. 2	Iowa State	W 89–66	24–1 (9–1)	16 – Mc. Morris	11 – (2 tied)	6 – (2 tied)	Allen Fieldhouse (16,300); Lawrence, KS
02/14/11; 8:00 pm, ESPN	No. 1	at Kansas State; Sunflower Showdown	L 68–84	24–2 (9–2)	14 – Reed	5 – Little	4 – Reed	Bramlage Coliseum (12,528); Manhattan, KS
02/19/11; 1:00 pm, ESPN	No. 1	Colorado	W 89–63	25–2 (10–2)	26 – Mk. Morris	Mk. Morris – 15	5 – (2-tied)	Allen Fieldhouse (16,300); Lawrence, KS
02/21/11; 8:00 pm, ESPN	No. 3	Oklahoma State	W 92–65	26–2 (11–2)	27 – Mc. Morris	10 – Little	5 – Reed	Allen Fieldhouse (16,300); Lawrence, KS
02/26/11; 3:00 pm, ESPN	No. 3	at Oklahoma	W 82–70	27–2 (12–2)	23 – Mc. Morris	10 – Mk. Morris	Morningstar – 4	Lloyd Noble Center (10,994); Norman, OK
03/02/11; 8:00 pm, ESPN	No. 2	No. 24 Texas A&M	W 64–51	28–2 (13–2)	13 – (2 tied)	5 – (2 tied)	4 – Morningstar	Allen Fieldhouse (16,300); Lawrence, KS
03/05/11; 11:00 am, CBS	No. 2	at No. 22 Missouri; Border War	W 70–66	29–2 (14–2)	21 – Mc. Morris	13 – Robinson	3 – (2 tied)	Mizzou Arena (15,061); Columbia, MO
Big 12 tournament
03/10/11; 11:30 am, ESPNU	(1) No. 2	vs. (9) Oklahoma State; Quarterfinals	W 63–62	30–2	16 – Mc. Morris	11 – Mc. Morris	4 – Morningstar	Sprint Center (18,910); Kansas City, MO
03/11/11; 6:00 pm, ESPN	(1) No. 2	vs. (5) Colorado; Semifinals	W 90–83	31–2	20 – (2 tied)	13 – Mc. Morris	5 – Morningstar	Sprint Center (18,910); Kansas City, MO
03/12/11; 5:00 pm, ESPN	(1) No. 2	vs. (2) No. 10 Texas; Championship Game	W 85–73	32–2	20 – Taylor	9 – (2 tied)	6 – Morningstar	Sprint Center (18,940); Kansas City, MO
NCAA tournament
3/18/11*; 5:50 pm, TBS	(1 SW) No. 2	vs. (16 SW) Boston University; Second Round	W 72–53	33–2	16 – Mc. Morris	9 – Mc. Morris	7 – T. Taylor	BOK Center (16,956); Tulsa, OK
3/20/11*; 7:40 pm, TNT	(1 SW) No. 2	vs. (9 SW) Illinois; Third Round	W 73–59	34–2	24 – Mk. Morris	12 – (2 tied)	6 – B. Morningstar	BOK Center (15,839); Tulsa, OK
3/25/11*; 6:27 pm, TBS	(1 SW) No. 2	vs. (12 SW) Richmond; Sweet Sixteen	W 77–57	35–2	18 – B. Morningstar	14 – T. Robinson	10 – T. Taylor	Alamodome (14,566); San Antonio, TX
3/27/11*; 1:20 pm, CBS	(1 SW) No. 2	vs. (11 SW) VCU; Elite Eight	L 61–71	35–3	20 – Mc. Morris	16 – Mc. Morris	3 – Morningstar, Taylor	Alamodome (14,724); San Antonio, TX
*Non-conference game. ^{#}Rankings from AP Poll. (#) Tournament seedings in parentheses. SW=NCAA Southwest Regional. All times are in Central Time.

== Rankings ==
Poll	Pre	Wk 1	Wk 2	Wk 3	Wk 4	Wk 5	Wk 6	Wk 7	Wk 8	Wk 9	Wk 10	Wk 11	Wk 12	Wk 13	Wk 14	Wk 15	Wk 16	Wk 17	Wk 18	Final
AP	7	7	6	4	4	3	3	3	3	3	2	6	2	2	1	3	2	2	2	
Coaches	7	6	6	4	4	3	3	3	3	3	2	6	2	2	1	2	2	2	2	4

== See also ==
- 2010–11 Big 12 Conference men's basketball season
- 2011 Big 12 men's basketball tournament
- 2010-11 NCAA Division I men's basketball season
- 2010-11 NCAA Division I men's basketball rankings
- 2011 NCAA Division I men's basketball tournament
