= Kenny Frease =

American basketball player (born 1989)

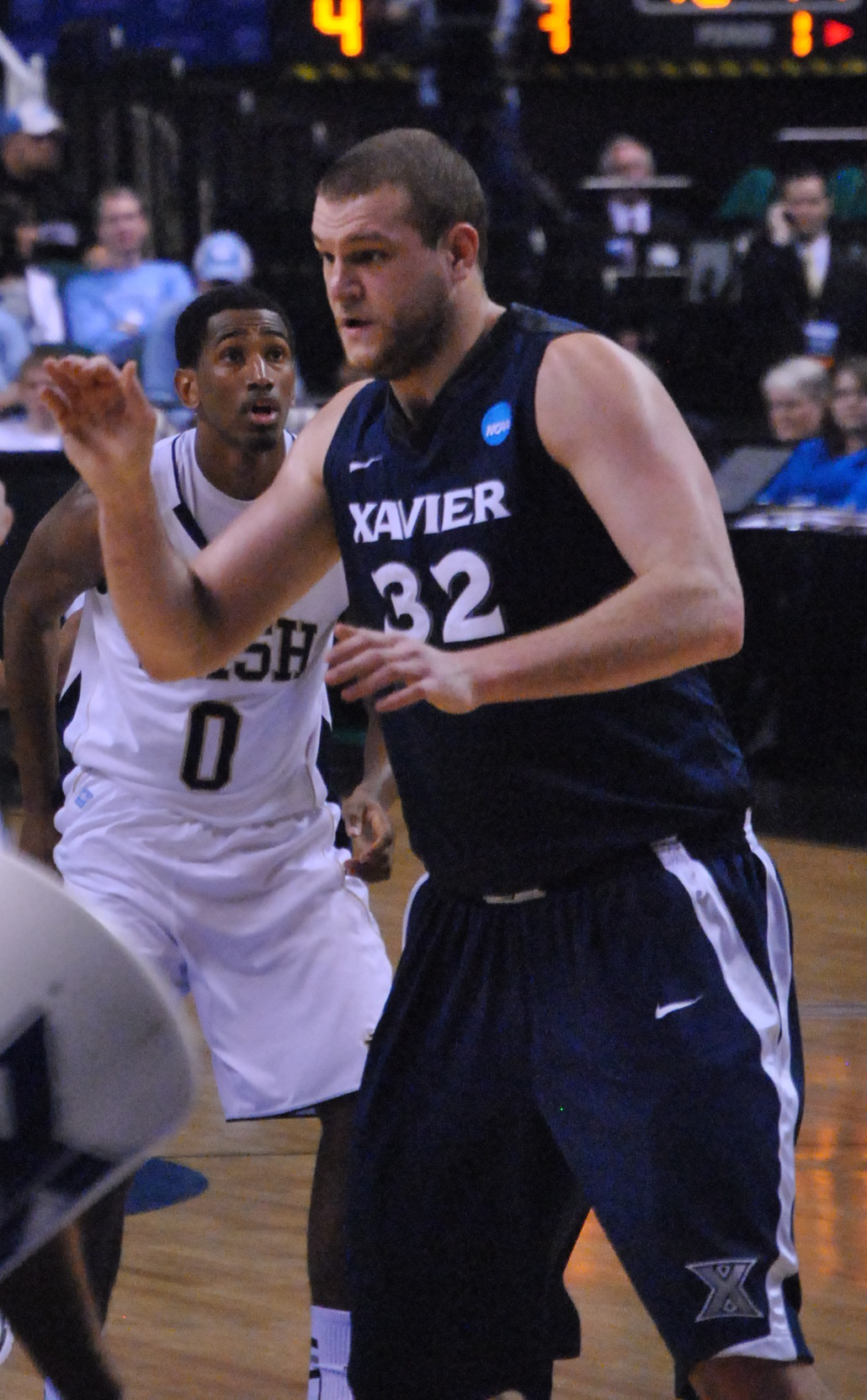
- Frease playing for Xavier

Personal information
- Born: October 18, 1989 (age 37) Massillon, Ohio, U.S.
- Listed height: 7 ft 0 in (2.13 m)
- Listed weight: 282 lb (128 kg)

Career information
- High school: Perry (Massillon, Ohio)
- College: Xavier (2008–2012)
- NBA draft: 2012: undrafted
- Playing career: 2012–2019
- Position: Center

Career history
- 2012–2013: Tigers Tübingen
- 2013–2014: Artland Dragons
- 2014–2015: Yeşilgiresun Belediye
- 2015: Artland Dragons
- 2015–2016: Braunschweig
- 2016–2017: Science City Jena
- 2018: SA Massagno Basket
- 2018–2019: BBC Monthey

Kenneth Eugene Frease III (born October 18, 1989) is a former American professional basketball player. He played college basketball for Xavier University.

== Career ==
On August 3, 2012, Frease signed with Tigers Tübingen of Germany for the 2012–13 season.

In July 2013, Frease joined the Milwaukee Bucks for the 2013 NBA Summer League. On August 3, 2013, he signed with Artland Dragons of Germany for the 2013–14 season.

In July 2014, Frease re-joined the Bucks for the 2014 NBA Summer League. On August 30, 2014, he signed with Yeşilgiresun Belediye of the Turkish TBL2. In January 2015, he left Yeşilgiresun and signed with his former team Artland Dragons for the rest of the season.

On June 25, 2015, Frease signed with Basketball Löwen Braunschweig of Germany for the 2015–16 season.

On August 28, 2016, Frease signed with Science City Jena of Germany for the 2016–17 season. He played for SA Massagno Basket in 2018 and averaged 12.8 points, 3.3 assists and 5.5 rebounds per game. On August 4, 2018, Frease signed with the Swiss team BBC Monthey.
