= Kevin Anderson (basketball) =

American basketball player (born 1988)

Liberty Flames
- Title: Director of Player Development
- League: ASUN Conference

Personal information
- Born: December 21, 1988 (age 37) Atlanta, Georgia
- Listed height: 6 ft 0 in (1.83 m)
- Listed weight: 170 lb (77 kg)

Career information
- High school: Whitefield Academy (Mableton, Georgia); Peachtree Ridge (Suwanee, Georgia)
- College: Richmond (2007–2011)
- NBA draft: 2011: undrafted
- Playing career: 2011–2017
- Position: Point guard
- Coaching career: 2018–present

Career history

Playing
- 2011–2012: Strasbourg IG
- 2012: Canton Charge
- 2012–2013: Pallacanestro Cantù
- 2013: SAM Massagno Basket
- 2013–2014: Ilysiakos
- 2014: Aliağa Petkim
- 2015: Nea Kifissia
- 2015–2016: BBC Sparta Bertrange
- 2016: Apollon Patras
- 2016: Enosis Neon Paralimni
- 2017: Czarni Słupsk

Coaching
- 2017–2018: Campbell (assistant DBO)
- 2018–2020: Liberty (assistant)
- 2020–2022: Liberty (dir. player development)

Career highlights
- Atlantic 10 Player of the Year (2010); 2x First-team All-Atlantic 10 (2010, 2011); Second-team All-Atlantic 10 (2009); Atlantic 10 Freshman of the Year (2008); No. 14 retired by Richmond Spiders

Kevin Anderson Jr. (born December 21, 1988) is an American former basketball coach and professional player. His last major coaching role was as director of player development for the Liberty Flames. He played college basketball for the University of Richmond.

== High school career ==
For his first three-years of high school, Anderson attended Whitefield Academy in Mableton, Georgia where he helped them to the state finals in 2005 and 2006. For his senior year, he transferred to Peachtree Ridge High School in Suwanee, Georgia where he led them to a 27–4 record and Georgia Elite Eight appearance. As a senior in 2006–07, he averaged 15.6 points, 5.2 assists, 2.7 rebounds and 2.3 steals per game.

== College career ==
In his freshman season at Richmond, Anderson earned Atlantic 10 Freshman of the Year and Atlantic 10 All-Freshman team honors. He was also named Virginia Collegiate Rookie of the Year by the Virginia Sports Information Directors. He earned the A-10 Rookie of the Week six of the last eight weeks of the season, only four A-10 players in league history have won the award more times. In 31 games (23 starts), he averaged 10.7 points, 2.7 rebounds, 3.0 assists and 1.8 steals in 34.8 minutes per game.

In his sophomore season, Anderson earned second-team All-Atlantic 10 honors after finishing the season with 598 points, ranking ninth on the school's single-season list. He became just the fourth Spider sophomore to reach 800 points and finished the season with 930 points. In 36 games (all starts), he averaged 16.6 points, 2.9 rebounds, 2.8 assists and 1.3 steals in 36.8 minutes per game.

In his junior season, Anderson earned Atlantic 10 Player of the Year and first-team All-Atlantic 10 honors, becoming the first Spider to earn each honor. He was also named an Associated Press Honorable Mention All-American, Richmond Times-Dispatch State Player of the Year and first-team All-State, and NABC Division I All-District first-team for District 4. In 35 games (all starts), he averaged 17.8 points, 3.4 rebounds, 2.7 assists and 1.7 steals in 37.1 minutes per game.

In his senior season, Anderson was named to the Naismith Trophy Men's College Player of Year Preseason Watch List, Wooden Award Preseason Top-50 List and one of 30 candidates for the Lowe's Senior CLASS Award. He was also named one of 20 finalists for the Bob Cousy Award, given to the top men's collegiate point guard. He earned first-team All-Atlantic 10 and NABC Division I All-District first-team for District 4 honors for the second straight year. He also earned the 2011 Atlantic 10 Tournament MVP after averaging 22 points in three games. In 37 games (all starts), he averaged 16.6 points, 2.8 rebounds, 3.3 assists and 1.4 steals in 36.2 minutes per game. On February 26, 2011, Anderson became the third player in Spider history to surpass 2,000 career points as he finished his career with 2,167.

== Professional career ==
Anderson went undrafted in the 2011 NBA draft. On July 23, 2011, he signed a one-year deal with Strasbourg IG of the LNB Pro A.

In July 2012, Anderson joined the Orlando Magic for the 2012 NBA Summer League. On September 28, 2012, he signed with the Cleveland Cavaliers. However, he was later waived by the Cavaliers on October 10, 2012. In November 2012, he was acquired by the Canton Charge as an affiliate player. On December 17, 2012, he was waived by the Charge.

On December 22, 2012, Anderson signed with Pallacanestro Cantù of Italy for the rest of the 2012–13 season. On April 2, 2013, he parted ways with Cantù and signed with SAM Massagno Basket of Switzerland for the rest of the season.

On September 23, 2013, Anderson signed with Ilysiakos of Greece for the 2013–14 season with a free buyout option for the month of January. He went on to exercise that right as he left Ilysiakos after 13 games and signed with Aliağa Petkim of Turkey for the rest of the season.

On November 1, 2014, Anderson was selected by the Erie BayHawks in the fifth round of the 2014 NBA D-League draft. However, he was later waived by the BayHawks on November 12, 2014. On March 2, 2015, he signed with Nea Kifissia of the Greek Basket League.

On October 28, 2015, Anderson Signed a contract with Luxemburg Diekirch League Team Sparta Bertange.

On February 1, 2016, Anderson signed a contract with Apollon Patras.

On October 30, 2016, Anderson was selected by the Austin Spurs in the 2016 NBA Development League draft. However, he was waived on November 11.
