= Matthew Bryan-Amaning =

British-Ghanaian basketball player (born 1988)

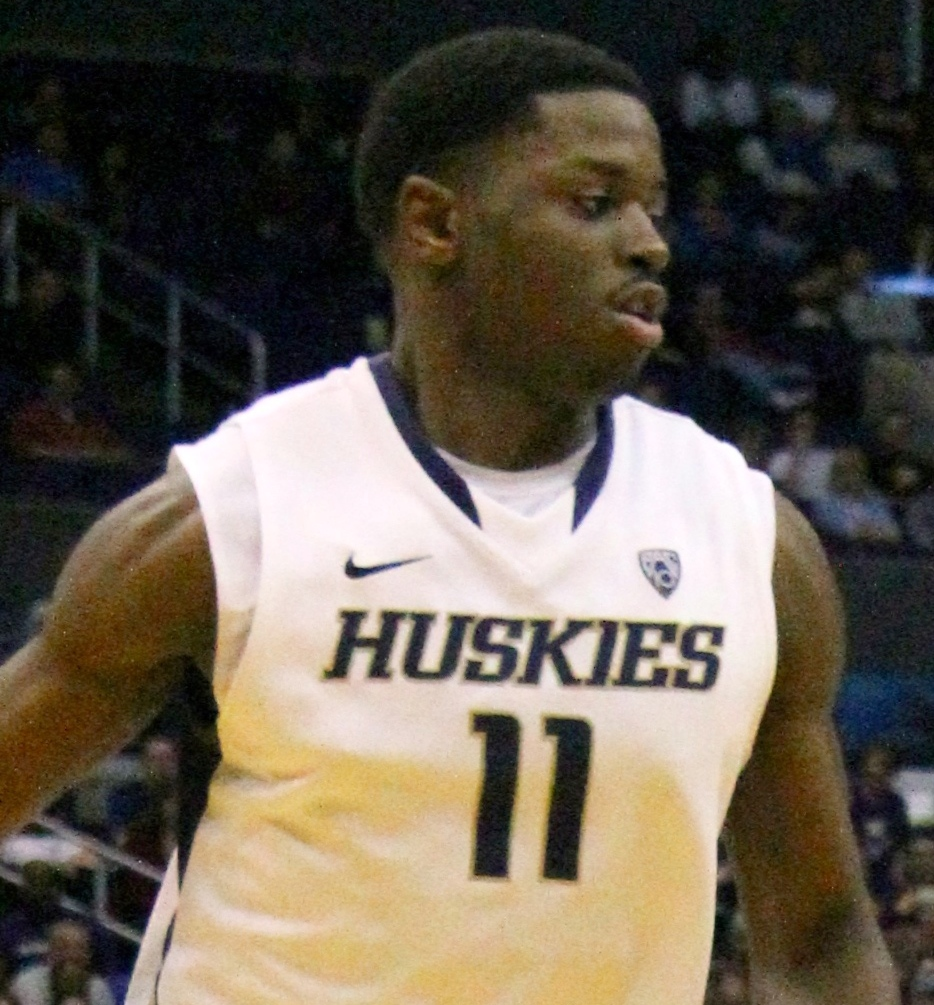
- Bryan-Amaning plays for Washington at the 2011 Pac-10 tournament.

Worthing Thunder
- Position: Power forward

Personal information
- Born: 9 May 1988 (age 38) London, England
- Listed height: 6 ft 9 in (2.06 m)
- Listed weight: 240 lb (109 kg)

Career information
- High school: South Kent School (South Kent, Connecticut)
- College: Washington (2007–2011)
- NBA draft: 2011: undrafted
- Playing career: 2011–present

Career history
- 2011–2012: Hacettepe Üniversitesi
- 2012–2013: Radnički Kragujevac
- 2013: London Lions
- 2013–2014: Olympique Antibes
- 2014: SO Maritime Boulogne
- 2014: MHP Riesen Ludwigsburg
- 2014–2015: Soles de Mexicali
- 2015: Soles de Santo Domingo Este
- 2015: Soles de Mexicali
- 2016: San Lorenzo de Almagro
- 2016–2017: Rizing Fukuoka
- 2018: Defensor Sporting
- 2018–2019: London City Royals
- 2020: London Lions
- 2020–2021: Worcester Wolves
- 2021–2022: Cheshire Phoenix
- 2023: AS Douanes
- 2024-2025: London Cavaliers
- 2025-2026: Worthing Thunder

Career highlights
- LNB champion (2016); Champion LNBP(mexico) (2015); First-team All-Pac-10 (2011); B3 MVP (2017)

Matthew Osei Bryan-Amaning (born 9 May 1988) is a British-Ghanaian professional basketball player, who plays for the Worthing Thunder in the British Championship Basketball (BCB). He has represented the Great Britain national team in international competition.

== Early life ==
Bryan-Amaning was born in London, and tried rugby, swimming and football as a kid. He picked up basketball when he was 4 years old.

Aged 16, he earned a scholarship at South Kent School in South Kent, Connecticut. There, he played alongside future NBA star Isaiah Thomas.

== College career ==
Bryan-Amaning played four seasons for the University of Washington Huskies, after joining in 2007 along with teammate Isaiah Thomas. During the 2010–11 season he averaged 16 points and 8 rebounds. Some of his best performances included 30 points against Arizona State on 22 January, 15 rebounds against Oregon State on 8 January and 4 steals and 7 blocks in a narrow 87–86 loss at Arizona on 19 February. Such performances led to Bryan-Amaning being named Pac-10's most improved player and first-team All-Pac-10. At the 2011 Pacific-10 Conference men's basketball tournament Bryan-Amaning helped the Huskies to their third Pac-12 tournament championship.

== Professional career ==
=== NBA Summer League ===
Following graduation, Bryan-Amaning was touted as a late second-round pick in the 2011 NBA draft, but went undrafted and decided to begin his career in Europe. In 2012, he was a member of the New Orleans Hornets squad in the NBA Summer League, where he averaged 2.2 ppg and 2.2 rpg with a 75 FT%. In 2013, Bryan-Amaning was again asked to play in the NBA Summer League, this time with the Chicago Bulls. He averaged 3.2 ppg, 3.0 rpg and 1.6 bpg, including a 5-block outing against the Portland Trail Blazers. In July 2014, he joined the Portland Trail Blazers for the 2014 NBA Summer League.

=== Overseas ===
Bryan-Amaning began his professional career with Hacettepe Üniversitesi of the Turkish Basketball League after signing a one-year contract with the club in July 2011. He signed with the Serbian team Radnički Kragujevac for the 2012–13 season, where he averaged 8.2 points and 3.2 rebounds per game in the Adriatic League. In October 2013 he signed a short-term deal with his hometown club London Lions of the British Basketball League, after a deal with Korean side Anyang KGC fell through. On 29 October 2013 he signed with Olympique Antibes. He left them in April 2014, and moved to SO Maritime Boulogne of the LNB Pro B for the rest of the season. In September 2014 he signed a one-year deal with MHP Riesen Ludwigsburg of Germany. On 28 October 2014 he left Ludwigsburg after playing five games in Bundesliga and averaging 7.2 points and 2.8 rebounds per game. Three days later, he signed with Soles de Mexicali of the Mexican LNBP. On 20 May 2015 he signed with Soles de Santo Domingo of Dominican Republic for the 2015 LNB season. On 2 September 2015, he returned to Soles de Mexicali. In April 2016, he signed with San Lorenzo de Almagro of the Argentine Liga Nacional de Básquet. He helped them to win the league title. In August 2016, Amaning signed with Japanese club Rizing Fukuoka for the 2016–17 season. In August 2017, he signed with Boca Juniors of Argentina for the 2017–18 season. However, he never appeared in an official game for Boca Juniors. On 17 January 2018 he signed with Defensor Sporting Club of the Liga Uruguaya de Basketball.

In March 2020, Bryan-Amaning signed with Zamalek in Egypt to play in the 2020 BAL season. The season was however delayed due to the COVID-19 pandemic, causing him to leave without playing a game. On 13 September 2020 he rejoined the London Lions. However, Bryan-Amaning parted ways with the team on 13 October. On 13 November 2020 Bryan-Amaning signed a short-term deal with the Worcester Wolves of the British Basketball League (BBL), following his departure from the London Lions in pre-season.

In February 2023, Bryan-Amaning joined AS Douanes from Senegal for the 2023 BAL season where he was eligible to play as an African import because of his Ghanaian heritage. With Douanes, he reached the 2023 BAL Final where the team lost to Al Ahly. He was the power forward of the team

== British national team ==
Bryan-Amaning began his international career at Under-16 level with England in 2004, moving up to Under-18 level and then into the Under-20 ranks with Great Britain in 2008, where he was ranked fourth among all players in the European Championships in blocked shots with 1.6 per game, as well as 12th in scoring, including a 41-point haul against the Czech Republic.

Bryan-Amaning made his senior debut for Great Britain against Canada in 2010. His best performance for GB came at the 2011 London Invitational where he averaged 1.7ppg and 2.7rpg against strong international competition including Croatia, China and France.

== Personal ==
Bryan-Amaning's parents live in Ghana. He is close friends with Luol Deng.

== See also ==
- List of foreign basketball players in Serbia
