= 2010–11 Pacific-10 Conference men's basketball season =

2010–11 Pac-10 Men's Basketball Season
- League: NCAA Division I
- Sport: Basketball
- Teams: 10

Regular Season
- Season champions: Arizona Wildcats
- Runners-up: UCLA Bruins
- Season MVP: Derrick Williams, Arizona

Tournament
- Champions: Washington Huskies
- Runners-up: Arizona Wildcats
- Finals MVP: Isaiah Thomas, Washington

Basketball seasons
- ← 09–10 11–12 →

2010–11 Pacific-10 Conference men's basketball standings
	Conf.				Overall
Team	W		L	PCT	W		L	PCT
No. 17 Arizona	14	–	4	.778	30	–	8	.789
UCLA	13	–	5	.722	23	–	11	.676
No. 23 Washington †	11	–	7	.611	24	–	11	.686
USC	10	–	8	.556	19	–	15	.559
California	10	–	8	.556	18	–	15	.545
Washington State	9	–	9	.500	22	–	13	.629
Oregon	7	–	11	.389	21	–	18	.538
Stanford	7	–	11	.389	15	–	16	.484
Oregon State	5	–	13	.278	11	–	20	.355
Arizona State	4	–	14	.222	12	–	19	.387
† Conference tournament winner As of March 30, 2011; Rankings from AP poll

The 2010–11 Pacific-10 Conference men's basketball season began with practices on October 18, 2010 and ended with the 2011 Pacific-10 Conference men's basketball tournament from March 9–11, 2011 at the Staples Center in Los Angeles. The regular season began on the weekend of November 12, with the conference schedule starting on December 30. The conference dedicated the season to legendary UCLA coach John Wooden, who died in June 2010 at age 99.

The Washington Huskies defeated the regular season champions Arizona Wildcats 77–75 in overtime to capture the tournament championship. Four Pac-10 teams were selected to participate in the NCAA tournament: Arizona, Washington, UCLA and USC.

This was the final season for the Pac-10 under that name. In July 2011, two schools joined the conference, at which time its name officially changed to Pac-12 Conference. Colorado arrived from the Big 12 and Utah entered from the Mountain West.

== Pre-season ==
- Pre-season media day was held on October 28, 2010 at L.A. Live's Nokia Theatre in downtown Los Angeles.
- Dana Altman was named the head coach of the Oregon Ducks.
- 2010–11 PAC-10 Men's Basketball Media Poll:

Rank, School (first-place votes), Points
1. Washington (33) 348
2. Arizona (1) 296
3. UCLA (1) 281
4. Arizona State 215
5. Washington State 191
6. USC 178
7. California 151
8. Oregon State 120
9. Stanford 98
10. Oregon 47

== Rankings ==
- November 8, 2010 – Washington #17 (Coaches)
- November 15, 2010 – Washington #17 (AP), #15 (Coaches)
- November 22, 2010 – Washington #13 (AP), #11 (Coaches)
- November 29, 2010 – Washington #23 (AP), #22 (Coaches)
- December 6, 2010 – Washington #21 (AP), #22 (Coaches)
- January 3, 2011 – Washington #23 (AP)
- January 10, 2011 – Washington #17 (AP), #18 (Coaches)

== Non-Conference games ==
- November 24, 2010 – UCLA lost to No. 7 Villanova at the semifinals of the NIT Season Tip-Off.
- December 18, 2010 – UCLA upset No. 16 (AP) BYU 86–79 at the John R. Wooden Classic.

== Conference games ==
- December 29 – First conference games.

== Conference tournament ==
- March 9–11, 2011 – Pac-10 Conference Basketball Tournament, Staples Center, Los Angeles, California.

First Round; March 9
8	Stanford	67
9	Oregon State	69
7	Washington State	76
10	Arizona State	69

Quarterfinals; March 10
1	Arizona (#16)	78
9	Oregon State	69
4	Southern California	70
5	California	56
3	Washington	89
6	Washington State	87
2	UCLA	59
7	Oregon	76

Semifinals; March 11
1	Arizona (#16)	67
4	Southern California	62
3	Washington	69
7	Oregon	51

Final; March 12
1	Arizona (#16)	75
3	Washington	77

== Head coaches ==
Sean Miller, Arizona
Herb Sendek, Arizona State
Mike Montgomery, California
Dana Altman, Oregon
Craig Robinson, Oregon State
Johnny Dawkins, Stanford
Ben Howland, UCLA
Kevin O'Neill, USC
Lorenzo Romar, Washington
Ken Bone, Washington State

== Postseason ==
=== NCAA tournament ===
- March 15, 2011 – Tournament begins.
- April 4, 2011 – National Championship game.
- March 13, 2011 – Four Pac-10 teams were selected: Arizona (West Region), Washington (East Region), UCLA (Southeast Region) and USC (Southwest Region).
- March 16, 2011 – USC ended its tournament hopes when they were defeated in the first round to VCU.
- March 17, 2011 – UCLA defeated Michigan State to advance to the third round to face Florida on Saturday, March 19, 2011.
- March 19, 2011 – UCLA was defeated by Florida 65–73 and ended its season.
- March 20, 2011 – Arizona defeated Texas 70–69 to advance to the Sweet Sixteen and Washington was defeated by North Carolina 83–86 to end the season.
- March 24, 2011 – Arizona defeated 1-seed Duke 93–77 in the Sweet Sixteen to advance to the Elite 8.
- March 26, 2011 – Arizona was defeated by UConn 65–63 in the Elite 8.

=== NIT ===
- March 13, 2011 – Two Pac-10 teams were selected to play in the NIT: California (Colorado bracket), Washington State (Boston College bracket).

== Highlights and notes ==
- November 12, 2010 – UCLA and Oregon kicked off the season with wins over San Diego State and North Dakota State respectively.
- February 25, 2011 – California was placed on two years probation for impermissible recruiting phone calls.
- February 26, 2011 – UCLA defeated Arizona in the final men's basketball game in Pauley Pavilion before the building goes into renovation for a year. The late Coach John Wooden's great-grandson Tyler Trapani scored the last two points for the Bruins.

== Awards and honors ==
- The Pac-10 Coach of the Year Award in both men’s and women’s basketball is now known as the John Wooden Coach of the Year Award.

=== Player-of-the-Week ===
- Nov. 22 – Reeves Nelson, UCLA
- Dec. 6 – Derrick Williams, ARIZ
- Dec. 20 – Reeves Nelson, UCLA
- Jan. 3 – Matthew Bryan-Amaning, WASH
- Jan. 17 – Derrick Williams, ARIZ
- Jan. 31 – Lamont Jones, ARIZ
- Feb. 14 – Isaiah Thomas, WASH
- Feb. 28 – Nikola Vucevic, USC
- Nov. 29 – Klay Thompson, WSU
- Dec. 13 – Klay Thompson, WSU
- Dec. 27 – Jio Fontan, USC
- Jan. 10 – Isaiah Thomas, WASH
- Jan. 24 – Isaiah Thomas, WASH
- Feb. 7 – Joevan Catron, ORE
- Feb. 21 – Derrick Williams, ARIZ
- Mar. 7 – Ty Abbott, ASU

=== All-Pac-10 teams ===
Voting was by conference coaches:

- Player of The Year: Derrick Williams, Arizona
- Freshman of The Year: Allen Crabbe, California
- Defensive Player of The Year: Marcus Simmons, USC
- Most Improved Player of The Year: Matthew Bryan-Amaning, Washington
- John R. Wooden Coach of the Year: Sean Miller, Arizona

FIRST TEAM:

Name	School	Pos.	Year	Ht., Wt.	Hometown (Prev. school)
Matthew Bryan-Amaning	WASH	F	Sr.	6–9 240	London, England (South Kent School, Conn.)
Jeremy Green	STAN	G	Jr.	6–4 198	Austin, Texas (Bowie HS)
Jorge Guiterrez	CAL	G	Jr.	6–3 195	Chihuahua, Mexico (Findlay College Prep, Nev.)
Tyler Honeycutt	UCLA	F	So.	6–8 183	Los Angeles, Calif. (Sylmar HS)
Malcolm Lee	UCLA	G	Jr.	6–4 195	Riverside, Calif. (John W. North HS)
Reeves Nelson	UCLA	F	So.	6–8 235	Modesto, Calif. (Modesto Christian HS)
Isaiah Thomas	WASH	G	Jr.	5–9 185	Tacoma, Wash. (South Kent School, Conn.)
Klay Thompson	WSU	G	Jr.	6–6 202	Ladera Ranch, Calif. (Santa Margarita HS)
Nikola Vucevic	USC	F	Jr.	6–10 240	Bar, Montenegro (Stoneridge Prep)
Derrick Williams	ARIZ	F	So.	6–8 240	La Mirada, Calif. (La Mirada HS)

=== All-Academic ===
First Team:

Player, School	Year	GPA	Major

Second Team:

Player, School	Year	GPA	Major

== NBA draft ==
Round	Pick	Player	Position	Nationality	Team	School/club team
1	2	Derrick Williams	SF/PF	United States	Minnesota Timberwolves	Arizona (So.)
1	11	Klay Thompson	SG	United States	Golden State Warriors	Washington State (Jr.)
1	16	Nikola Vučević	C	Montenegro	Philadelphia 76ers	USC (Jr.)
2	35	Tyler Honeycutt	SF	United States	Sacramento Kings	UCLA (So.)
2	43	Malcolm Lee	SG	United States	Chicago Bulls (from Utah, traded to Minnesota)	UCLA (Jr.)
2	60	Isaiah Thomas	PG	United States	Sacramento Kings (from Chicago via Milwaukee)	Washington (Jr.)
