= 2010–11 Oregon Ducks men's basketball team =

American college basketball season

2010–11 Oregon Ducks men's basketball

BTI Invitational tournament champions

College Basketball Invitational Champions
- Conference: Pacific-10 Conference
- Record: 21–18 (7–11 Pac-10)
- Head coach: Dana Altman
- Assistant coaches: Brian Fish; Kevin McKenna; Tony Stubblefield
- Home arena: McArthur Court; Matthew Knight Arena

2010–11 Pacific-10 Conference men's basketball standings
	Conf.				Overall
Team	W		L	PCT	W		L	PCT
No. 17 Arizona	14	–	4	.778	30	–	8	.789
UCLA	13	–	5	.722	23	–	11	.676
No. 23 Washington †	11	–	7	.611	24	–	11	.686
USC	10	–	8	.556	19	–	15	.559
California	10	–	8	.556	18	–	15	.545
Washington State	9	–	9	.500	22	–	13	.629
Oregon	7	–	11	.389	21	–	18	.538
Stanford	7	–	11	.389	15	–	16	.484
Oregon State	5	–	13	.278	11	–	20	.355
Arizona State	4	–	14	.222	12	–	19	.387
† Conference tournament winner As of March 30, 2011; Rankings from AP poll

The 2010–11 Oregon Ducks men's basketball team represented the University of Oregon during the 2010–11 NCAA Division I men's basketball season. The Ducks, led by first year head coach Dana Altman, played the first part of their home games at McArthur Court until the completion of their new stadium, Matthew Knight Arena, in January. They are members of the Pacific-10 Conference. They finished the season 21–18, 7–11 in Pac-10 play and lost in the semifinals of the 2011 Pacific-10 Conference men's basketball tournament to Washington. They were invited to and were champions of the 2011 College Basketball Invitational, defeating Creighton in the best-of-three games finals 2–1. The Ducks were the second team from the Pac-10 to enter the CBI with a losing record and win the tournament (Oregon State, 2009).

== Roster ==
Number	Name	Position	Height	Weight	Year	Hometown
1	Nicholas Fearn	Guard	6–1	188	Junior	Seattle, Washington
2	Matt Losli	Guard	6–4	185	Sophomore	Tualatin, Oregon
3	Garrett Sim	Guard	6–1	181	Junior	Portland, Oregon
4	Nicholas Lucenti	Guard	6–3	212	Freshman	Los Angeles
10	Johnathan Loyd	Guard	5–8	160	Freshman	Las Vegas, Nevada
11	Malcolm Armstead	Guard	6–0	195	Junior	Florence, Alabama
12	Martin Seiferth	Center	6–10	223	Freshman	Berlin, Germany
15	John Elorriaga	Guard	6–2	205	Junior	Portland, Oregon
22	Teondre Williams	Guard	6–4	218	Junior	Atlanta
23	Jeremy Jacob	Forward	6–8	226	Junior	Baton Rouge, Louisiana
25	E. J. Singler	Forward	6–6	210	Sophomore	Medford, Oregon
31	Tyrone Nared	Forward	6–8	210	Junior	Woonsocket, Rhode Island
34	Joevan Catron	Forward	6–6	245	RS Senior	Phoenix, Illinois
55	Jay-R Strowbridge	Guard	5–11	180	Senior	Huntsville, Alabama

== Schedule ==
Date time, TV	Rank^{#}	Opponent^{#}	Result	Record	Site (attendance) city, state
Exhibition
11/06/2010*; 7:00 pm		Northwest Christian	W 80–53	—	McArthur Court; Eugene, Oregon
Regular season
11/12/2010*; 7:00 pm		North Dakota State; BTI Invitational	W 97–92 ^{OT}	1–0	McArthur Court (6,523); Eugene, Oregon
11/13/2010*; 8:30 pm		Denver; BTI Invitational	W 68–56	2–0	McArthur Court (6,199); Eugene, Oregon
11/14/2010*; 6:00 pm, CSNNW		UC Santa Barbara; BTI Invitational	W 72–70	3–0	McArthur Court (6,197); Eugene, Oregon
11/20/2010*; 2:00 pm		San Jose State	L 72–75	3–1	McArthur Court (7,352); Eugene, Oregon
11/23/2010*; 7:00 pm, CSNNW		Texas Southern	W 75–52	4–1	McArthur Court (6,318); Eugene, Oregon
11/27/2010*; 1:00 pm, FSN		vs. No. 1 Duke	L 71–98	4–2	Rose Garden (12,914); Portland, Oregon
12/02/2010*; 8:00 pm, FSN		No. 9 Missouri; Big 12/Pac-10 Hardwood Series	L 80–83	4–3	McArthur Court (6,843); Eugene, Oregon
12/05/2010*; 2:00 pm, CSNNW		Portland State	W 68–49	5–3	McArthur Court (5,975); Eugene, Oregon
12/11/2010*; 7:00 pm, CSNNW		Willamette	W 100–67	6–3	McArthur Court (6,953); Eugene, Oregon
12/13/2010*; 7:00 pm		Jacksonville State	W 74–56	7–3	McArthur Court (6,048); Eugene, Oregon
12/17/2010*; 5:00 pm, CSNMA		at Virginia	L 48–63	7–4	John Paul Jones Arena (9,708); Charlottesville, Virginia
12/21/2010*; 7:00 pm, CSNNW		Idaho	L 65–69	7–5	McArthur Court (6,635); Eugene, Oregon
12/30/2010; 7:00 pm, CSNNW		Arizona	L 57–76	7–6 (0–1)	McArthur Court (6,498); Eugene, Oregon
01/01/2011; 7:00 pm		Arizona State	L 55–60	7–7 (0–2)	McArthur Court (7,165); Eugene, Oregon
01/06/2011; 5:30 pm, FSNNW		at No. 23 Washington	L 69–87	7–8 (0–3)	Alaska Airlines Arena (9,692); Seattle, WA
01/08/2011; 7:30 pm, FSNNW		at Washington State	L 63–77	7–9 (0–4)	Beasley Coliseum (6,690); Pullman, WA
01/13/2011; 7:30 pm, FSN		USC	W 68–62	8–9 (1–4)	Matthew Knight Arena (12,364); Eugene, Oregon
01/15/2011; 2:00 pm, CSNNW		UCLA	L 59–67	8–10 (1–5)	Matthew Knight Arena (11,089); Eugene, Oregon
01/22/2011; 3:00 pm, FSN		at Oregon State; Civil War	W 63–59	9–10 (2–5)	Gill Coliseum (9,836); Corvallis, Oregon
01/27/2011; 7:00 pm		at Stanford	W 67–59	10–10 (3–5)	Maples Pavilion (5,159); Stanford, California
01/29/2011; 3:00 pm, CSNNW		at California	L 77–85	10–11 (3–6)	Haas Pavilion (8,629); Berkeley, California
02/03/2011; 6:00 pm, CSNNW		Washington State	W 69–43	11–11 (4–6)	Matthew Knight Arena (10,017); Eugene, Oregon
02/05/2011; 1:00 pm, FSN		No. 20 Washington	W 81–76	12–11 (5–6)	Matthew Knight Arena (11,925); Eugene, Oregon
02/10/2011; 7:30 pm, CSNNW		at UCLA	L 54–64	12–12 (5–7)	Pauley Pavilion (7,406); Los Angeles, CA
02/12/2011; 7:30 pm		at USC	W 61–51	13–12 (6–7)	Galen Center (4,421); Los Angeles, California
02/19/2011; 1:00 pm, FSN		Oregon State; Civil War	W 82–63	14–12 (7–7)	Matthew Knight Arena (12,369); Eugene, Oregon
02/24/2011; 6:00 pm, CSNNW		California	L 71–81	14–13 (7–8)	Matthew Knight Arena (10,487); Eugene, Oregon
02/26/2011; 3:00 pm, CSNNW		Stanford	L 71–88	14–14 (7–9)	Matthew Knight Arena (12,364); Eugene, Oregon
03/03/2011; 5:30 pm		at Arizona State	L 53–73	14–15 (7–10)	Wells Fargo Arena (5,544); Tempe, Arizona
03/05/2011; 11:00 am, CBS		at Arizona	L 82–90	14–16 (7–11)	McKale Center (14,605); Tucson, Arizona
Pac-10 tournament
03/09/2011; 8:30 pm, FSN	(7)	vs. (10) Arizona State; Pac-10 First Round	W 76–69	15–16	Staples Center (7,814); Los Angeles, CA
03/10/2011; 6:00 pm, FSN	(7)	vs. (2) UCLA; Pac-10 Quarterfinals	W 76–59	16–16	Staples Center (12,191); Los Angeles, CA
03/11/2011; 6:00 pm, FSN	(7)	vs. (3) Washington; Pac-10 Semifinals	L 51–69	16–17	Staples Center (13,190); Los Angeles, CA
CBI
03/16/2011*; 7:00 pm, HDNet		Weber State; CBI First Round	W 68–59	17–17	Matthew Knight Arena (4,375); Eugene, Oregon
03/21/2011*; 7:00 pm, HDNet		Duquesne; CBI Quarterfinals	W 77–75	18–17	Matthew Knight Arena (5,369); Eugene, Oregon
03/23/2011*; 7:00 pm, HDNet		Boise State; CBI Semifinals	W 79–71	19–17	Matthew Knight Arena (6,157); Eugene, Oregon
03/28/2011*; 5:00 pm, HDNet		at Creighton; CBI Finals - Game 1	L 76–84	19–18	Qwest Center Omaha (12,381); Omaha, Nebraska
03/30/2011*; 7:00 pm, HDNet		Creighton; CBI Finals - Game 2	W 71–58	20–18	Matthew Knight Arena (7,875); Eugene, Oregon
04/01/2011*; 7:00 pm, HDNet		Creighton; CBI Finals – Game 3	W 71–69	21–18	Matthew Knight Arena (9,335); Eugene, Oregon
*Non-conference game. ^{#}Rankings from AP Poll. (#) Tournament seedings in parentheses. All times are in Pacific Time.
