= 2010–11 Washington Huskies men's basketball team =

American college basketball season

2010–11 Washington Huskies men's basketball

Pac-10 tournament champions

NCAA tournament, Round of 32
- Conference: Pacific-10 Conference

Ranking
- Coaches: No. 23
- AP: No. 23
- Record: 24–11 (11–7 Pac-10)
- Head coach: Lorenzo Romar
- Assistant coaches: Raphael Chillious; Paul Fortier; Jim Shaw
- Home arena: Alaska Airlines Arena

2010–11 Pacific-10 Conference men's basketball standings
	Conf.				Overall
Team	W		L	PCT	W		L	PCT
No. 17 Arizona	14	–	4	.778	30	–	8	.789
UCLA	13	–	5	.722	23	–	11	.676
No. 23 Washington †	11	–	7	.611	24	–	11	.686
USC	10	–	8	.556	19	–	15	.559
California	10	–	8	.556	18	–	15	.545
Washington State	9	–	9	.500	22	–	13	.629
Oregon	7	–	11	.389	21	–	18	.538
Stanford	7	–	11	.389	15	–	16	.484
Oregon State	5	–	13	.278	11	–	20	.355
Arizona State	4	–	14	.222	12	–	19	.387
† Conference tournament winner As of March 30, 2011; Rankings from AP poll

The 2010–11 Washington Huskies men's basketball team represented the University of Washington in the 2010–11 college basketball season. This was head coach Lorenzo Romar's 9th season at Washington. The Huskies played their home games at Alaska Airlines Arena and were members of the Pacific-10 Conference. As the winner of the 2011 Pacific-10 Conference men's basketball tournament, the Huskies earned an automatic bid in the NCAA tournament, the school's 16th appearance in the NCAA tournament. At the national tournament, the Huskies beat Georgia in the second round before falling to eventual Elite Eight contender North Carolina in the third round. They finished the season with a 24–11 record.

== Recruits ==
College recruiting
Name	Hometown	School	Height	Weight	Commit date
Terrence Ross; SG	Portland, Oregon	Jefferson	6 ft 6 in (1.98 m)	180 lb (82 kg)	Apr 26, 2010
Terrence Ross; SG	Recruit ratings: Scout: Rivals: (95)				
Aziz N'Diaye; C	Dakar, Senegal	College of Southern Idaho	7 ft 1 in (2.16 m)	230 lb (100 kg)	Apr 14, 2010
Aziz N'Diaye; C	Recruit ratings: Scout: Rivals: (JC)				
Desmond Simmons; SF	Vallejo, California	Salesian	6 ft 7 in (2.01 m)	205 lb (93 kg)	May 12, 2009
Desmond Simmons; SF	Recruit ratings: Scout: Rivals: (89)				
Overall recruit ranking: Scout: nr Rivals: nr ESPN: nr
Note: In many cases, Scout, Rivals, 247Sports, On3, and ESPN may conflict in their listings of height and weight.; In these cases, the average was taken. ESPN grades are on a 100-point scale.; Sources: "ESPN". ESPN.; "2010 Team Ranking". Rivals.

== 2010–11 team ==
=== Roster ===
#	Name	Height	Weight (lbs.)	Position	Class	Hometown	Previous team(s)
0	Abdul Gaddy*	6'3"	195	G	So.	Tacoma, WA, U.S.	Bellarmine Prep
1	Venoy Overton	6'0"	185	G	Sr.	Seattle, WA, U.S.	Franklin HS
2	Isaiah Thomas	5'9"	185	G	Jr.	Tacoma, WA, U.S.	South Kent School
5	Aziz N'Diaye	7'0"	260	C	So.	Dakar, Senegal	College of Southern Idaho
10	Antoine Hosley	5'11"	185	G	Fr.	Portland, OR, U.S.	Jefferson HS
11	Matthew Bryan-Amaning	6'9"	240	F	Sr.	London, England, U.K.	South Kent School
15	Scott Suggs	6'6"	195	G	Jr.	Washington, MO, U.S.	Washington HS
22	Justin Holiday	6'6"	180	F	Sr.	Chatsworth, CA, U.S.	Campbell Hall School
23	C. J. Wilcox	6'5"	190	G	RS Fr.	Pleasant Grove, UT, U.S.	Pleasant Grove HS
30	Desmond Simmons	6'7"	215	F	Fr.	Vallejo, CA, U.S.	Salesian HS
31	Terrence Ross	6'6"	190	G	Fr.	Portland, OR, U.S.	Jefferson HS
33	Tyreese Breshers	6'7"	255	F	So.	Los Angeles, CA, U.S.	Price HS
42	Brendan Sherrer	6'8"	245	F	Jr.	Monroe, WA, U.S.	Archbishop Murphy HS
44	Darnell Gant	6'8"	225	F	RS Jr.	Los Angeles, CA, U.S.	Crenshaw HS

Abdul Gaddy suffered an ACL tear January 5, 2011 and sat out the remainder of the season.*

=== Coaching staff ===
Name	Position	Year at Washington	Alma mater (year)
Lorenzo Romar	Head coach	9th	Washington (1980)
Raphael Chillious	Assistant coach	3rd	Lafayette (1996)
Paul Fortier	Assistant coach	6th	Washington (2003)
Jim Shaw	Assistant coach	7th	Western Oregon State (1985)
Lance LaVetter	Director of basketball operations	9th	Northern Arizona (1992)

== Schedule and results ==
Date time, TV	Rank^{#}	Opponent^{#}	Result	Record	Site (attendance) city, state
Exhibition
11/06/2010*; 5:00 pm	No. 18	Saint Martin's	W 97–76	–	Alaska Airlines Arena (8,909); Seattle, WA
Regular season
11/13/2010*; 1:00 pm	No. 18	McNeese State	W 118–64	1–0	Alaska Airlines Arena (8,914); Seattle, WA
11/16/2010*; 7:00 pm, FSNNW	No. 17	Eastern Washington	W 98–72	2–0	Alaska Airlines Arena (8,897); Seattle, WA
11/22/2010*; 9:00 pm, ESPN2	No. 13	vs. Virginia; Maui Invitational first round	W 106–63	3–0	Lahaina Civic Center (2,400); Maui, HI
11/23/2010*; 6:30 pm, ESPN	No. 13	vs. No. 8 Kentucky; Maui Invitational semifinals	L 67–74	3–1	Lahaina Civic Center (2,400); Maui, HI
11/24/2010*; 2:00 pm, ESPN2	No. 13	vs. No. 2 Michigan State; Maui Invitational 3rd place game	L 71–76	3–2	Lahaina Civic Center (2,400); Maui, HI
11/30/2010*; 8:00 pm, FSNNW	No. 23	Long Beach State	W 102–75	4–2	Alaska Airlines Arena (9,223); Seattle, WA
12/04/2010*; 1:00 pm, FSN	No. 23	Texas Tech; Big 12/Pac-10 Hardwood Series	W 108–79	5–2	Alaska Airlines Arena (9,044); Seattle, WA
12/06/2010*; 7:00 pm, FSNNW	No. 21	Portland	W 94–72	6–2	Alaska Airlines Arena (9,425); Seattle, WA
12/11/2010*; 1:30 pm, ESPN2	No. 21	at Texas A&M; Big 12/Pac-10 Hardwood Series	L 62–63	6–3	Reed Arena (10,296); College Station, TX
12/18/2010*; 7:00 pm, FSNNW		San Francisco	W 80–52	7–3	Alaska Airlines Arena (9,807); Seattle, WA
12/22/2010*; 6:00 pm, FSNNW		Nevada	W 90–60	8–3	Alaska Airlines Arena (10,000); Seattle, WA
12/29/2010; 7:30 pm		at USC	W 73–67 ^{OT}	9–3 (1–0)	Galen Center (5,584); Los Angeles, CA
12/31/2010; 1:00 pm, FSN		at UCLA	W 74–63	10–3 (2–0)	Pauley Pavilion (9,049); Los Angeles, CA
01/06/2011; 5:30 pm, FSNNW	No. 23	Oregon	W 87–69	11–3 (3–0)	Alaska Airlines Arena (9,692); Seattle, WA
01/08/2011; 3:30 pm, FSNNW	No. 23	Oregon State	W 103–72	12–3 (4–0)	Alaska Airlines Arena (9,671); Seattle, WA
01/13/2011; 7:00 pm	No. 17	at Stanford	L 56–58	12–4 (4–1)	Maples Pavilion (5,896); Stanford, CA
01/16/2011; 7:00 pm, FSN	No. 17	at California	W 92–71	13–4 (5–1)	Haas Pavilion (8,649); Berkeley, CA
01/20/2011; 7:30 pm, FSN	No. 20	No. 25 Arizona	W 85–68	14–4 (6–1)	Alaska Airlines Arena (10,000); Seattle, WA
01/22/2011; 1:00 pm, FSN	No. 20	Arizona State	W 88–75	15–4 (7–1)	Alaska Airlines Arena (9,905); Seattle, WA
01/30/2011; 7:00 pm, FSN	No. 18	at Washington State; Rivalry	L 80–87	15–5 (7–2)	Beasley Coliseum (10,579); Pullman, WA
02/03/2011; 6:00 pm, FSNNW	No. 20	at Oregon State	L 56–68	15–6 (7–3)	Gill Coliseum (5,783); Corvallis, OR
02/05/2011; 1:00 pm, FSN	No. 20	at Oregon	L 76–81	15–7 (7–4)	Matthew Knight Arena (11,925); Eugene, OR
02/10/2011; 6:00 pm, FSNNW		California	W 109–77	16–7 (8–4)	Alaska Airlines Arena (9,883); Seattle, WA
02/12/2011; 5:30 pm, FSNNW		Stanford	W 87–76	17–7 (9–4)	Alaska Airlines Arena (10,000); Seattle, WA
02/17/2011; 5:30 pm		at Arizona State	W 79–62	18–7 (10–4)	Wells Fargo Arena (7,263); Tempe, AZ
02/19/2011; 3:00 pm, ESPN		at No. 12 Arizona	L 86–87	18–8 (10–5)	McKale Center (14,619); Tucson, AZ
02/22/2011*; 7:10 pm, FSNNW		at Seattle; Rivalry	W 95–74	19–8	KeyArena (11,386); Seattle, WA
02/27/2011; 7:00 pm, FSN		Washington State; Rivalry	L 69–80	19–9 (10–6)	Alaska Airlines Arena (10,000); Seattle, WA
03/03/2011; 6:00 pm, ESPN2		UCLA	W 70–63	20–9 (11–6)	Alaska Airlines Arena (9,931); Seattle, WA
03/05/2011; 7:30 pm, FSN		USC	L 60–62	20–10 (11–7)	Alaska Airlines Arena (10,000); Seattle, WA
Pac-10 Tournament
03/10/2011; 8:30 pm, FSN	(3)	vs. (6) Washington State; Quarterfinals	W 89–87	21–10	Staples Center (12,191); Los Angeles, CA
03/11/2011; 8:30 pm, FSN	(3)	vs. (7) Oregon; Semifinals	W 69–51	22–10	Staples Center (13,190); Los Angeles, CA
03/12/2011; 3:00 pm, CBS	(3)	vs. (1) No. 16 Arizona; Championship Game	W 77–75 ^{OT}	23–10	Staples Center (12,074); Los Angeles, CA
NCAA tournament
03/18/2011*; 6:45 pm, CBS	(7 E) No. 23	vs. (10 E) Georgia; Second Round	W 68–65	24–10	Time Warner Cable Arena (16,852); Charlotte, NC
03/20/2011*; 12:15 pm, CBS	(7 E) No. 23	vs. (2 E) No. 7 North Carolina; Third Round	L 83–86	24–11	Time Warner Cable Arena (18,329); Charlotte, NC
*Non-conference game. ^{#}Rankings from AP poll. (#) Tournament seedings in parentheses. All times are in Pacific time.

== Notes ==
- Isaiah Thomas, who hit the game-winning shot in overtime, was named Most Outstanding Player at the Pac-10 Tournament. C.J. Wilcox hit a 3-pointer in regulations to send the game into an extra period.
- Named to the Pac-10 All Tournament Team were Terrence Ross and Isaiah Thomas.
