= 2010–11 Washington State Cougars men's basketball team =

American college basketball season

2010–11 Washington State Cougars men's basketball

NIT, Semifinals
- Conference: Pacific-10 Conference
- Record: 22–13 (9–9 Pac-10)
- Head coach: Ken Bone
- Assistant coaches: Curtis Allen; Jeff Hironaka; Ben Johnson
- Home arena: Beasley Coliseum

2010–11 Pacific-10 Conference men's basketball standings
	Conf.				Overall
Team	W		L	PCT	W		L	PCT
No. 17 Arizona	14	–	4	.778	30	–	8	.789
UCLA	13	–	5	.722	23	–	11	.676
No. 23 Washington †	11	–	7	.611	24	–	11	.686
USC	10	–	8	.556	19	–	15	.559
California	10	–	8	.556	18	–	15	.545
Washington State	9	–	9	.500	22	–	13	.629
Oregon	7	–	11	.389	21	–	18	.538
Stanford	7	–	11	.389	15	–	16	.484
Oregon State	5	–	13	.278	11	–	20	.355
Arizona State	4	–	14	.222	12	–	19	.387
† Conference tournament winner As of March 30, 2011; Rankings from AP poll

The 2010–11 Washington State Cougars men's basketball team represented Washington State University during the 2010–11 NCAA Division I men's basketball season. The team played its home games on Jack Friel Court at Beasley Coliseum in Pullman, Washington and are members of the Pacific-10 Conference. They were led by second year head coach Ken Bone. They finished the season 22–13, 9–9 in Pac-10 play and lost in the quarterfinals of the 2011 Pacific-10 Conference men's basketball tournament to rival Washington. They were invited to the 2011 National Invitation Tournament where they advanced to the semifinals in Madison Square Garden where they lost to Wichita State.

== Roster ==
Name	Number	Position	Height	Weight	Year	Hometown	Last School/College
Marcus Capers	0	Guard	6–4	185	Junior	Winter Haven, FL	Montverde Acad.
Klay Thompson	1	Guard	6–6	202	Junior	Ladera Ranch, California	Santa Margarita Catholic HS
Mike Ladd	2	Guard	6–5	190	Junior	Seattle, WA	Fresno State
Reggie Moore	3	Guard	6–1	180	Sophomore	Seattle, Washington	Brewster Acad.
Will DiIorio	5	Guard	6–5	188	Freshman	Bainbridge Island, WA	Bainbridge HS
Faisal Aden	11	Guard	6–4	185	Junior	San Diego, CA	Hillsborough CC
Brock Motum	12	Forward	6–10	230	Sophomore	Brisbane, Australia	Australian Institute of Sport
Steven Bjornstad	13	Center	6–11	240	Sophomore	Vancouver, WA	Columbia River HS
Chris McNamara	15	Center	6–10	277	Junior	Leeds, England	Bellevue CC
Ben Loewen	22	Guard	6–0	172	RS Junior	Spokane, WA	Whitworth
DeAngelo Casto	23	Forward	6–8	255	Junior	Spokane, WA	Joel E. Ferris HS
Dexter Kernich-Drew	24	Guard	6–6	180	Freshman	Melbourne, Australia	Caulfield Grammar
Andre Winston	25	Guard	6–1	166	Freshman	Lakewood, WA	Lakes HS
Abe Lodwick	31	Guard/Forward	6–7	208	RS Junior	Bend, OR	Mountain View HS
Charlie Enquist	40	Forward	6–10	235	RS Junior	Edmonds, WA	King's HS
Patrick Simon	44	Forward	6–8	214	Freshman	Epharta, WA	Ephrata HS

== Schedule ==
Date time, TV	Rank^{#}	Opponent^{#}	Result	Record	Site (attendance) city, state
Exhibition
11/05/2010*; 6:00 pm		Lewis–Clark State	W 89–49	—	Beasley Coliseum (3,682); Pullman, WA
Regular season
11/13/2010*; 5:00 pm		Southern	W 86–47	1–0	Beasley Coliseum (6,173); Pullman, WA
11/16/2010*; 7:00 pm		Idaho; Battle of the Palouse	W 88–71	2–0	Beasley Coliseum (6,024); Pullman, WA
11/23/2010*; 7:30 pm, FSNNW		vs. Portland; Cougar Hardwood Classic	W 84–68	3–0	KeyArena (8,441); Seattle, WA
11/25/2010*; 7:00 pm		at Fresno State	W 66–55	4–0	Save Mart Center (7,158); Fresno, CA
11/30/2010*; 7:00 pm		Sacramento State	W 84–36	5–0	Beasley Coliseum (5,099); Pullman, WA
12/03/2010*; 8:00 pm, FSN		No. 5 Kansas State; Big 12/Pac-10 Hardwood Series	L 58–63	5–1	Beasley Coliseum (11,671); Pullman, WA
12/08/2010*; 8:00 pm, FSN		Gonzaga; Rivalry	W 81–59	6–1	Beasley Coliseum (10,177); Pullman, WA
12/10/2010*; 7:00 pm		vs. Texas–Pan American	W 74–52	7–1	Spokane Arena (4,382); Spokane, WA
12/19/2010*; 7:00 pm		at Santa Clara	W 85–79 ^{OT}	8–1	Leavey Center (1,897); Santa Clara, CA
12/22/2010*; 12:00 pm, ESPNU		vs. Mississippi State; Diamond Head Classic Quarterfinals	W 83–57	9–1	Stan Sheriff Center (7,391); Honolulu, HI
12/23/2010*; 3:30 pm, ESPNU		vs. No. 15 Baylor; Diamond Head Classic Semifinals	W 77–71	10–1	Stan Sheriff Center (7,179); Honolulu, HI
12/25/2010*; 6:30 pm, ESPN2		vs. Butler; Diamond Head Classic Championship	L 68–84	10–2	Stan Sheriff Center (6,367); Honolulu, HI
12/29/2010; 8:00 pm, FSN		at UCLA	L 71–80	10–3 (0–1)	Pauley Pavilion (7,934); Los Angeles, CA
12/31/2010; 3:00 pm, FSNNW		at USC	L 56–60	10–4 (0–2)	Galen Center (3,581); Los Angeles, CA
01/06/2011; 7:00 pm		Oregon State	W 84–70	11–4 (1–2)	Beasley Coliseum (5,849); Pullman, WA
01/08/2011; 7:30 pm, FSNNW		Oregon	W 77–63	12–4 (2–2)	Beasley Coliseum (6,690); Pullman, WA
01/13/2011; 7:30 pm		at California	L 81–88 ^{OT}	12–5 (2–3)	Haas Pavilion (6,903); Berkeley, CA
01/15/2011; 5:00 pm		at Stanford	W 61–58	13–5 (3–3)	Maples Pavilion (5,803); Stanford, CA
01/20/2011; 7:00 pm		Arizona State	W 78–61	14–5 (4–3)	Beasley Coliseum (7,157); Pullman, WA
01/22/2011; 7:30 pm, FSNNW		No. 25 Arizona	L 63–65	14–6 (4–4)	Beasley Coliseum (8,850); Pullman, WA
01/30/2011; 7:00 pm, FSN		No. 17 Washington; Rivalry	W 87–80	15–6 (5–4)	Beasley Coliseum (10,579); Pullman, WA
02/03/2011; 6:00 pm		at Oregon	L 43–69	15–7 (5–5)	Matthew Knight Arena (10,017); Eugene, OR
02/05/2011; 6:00 pm, FSNNW		at Oregon State	W 61–55	16–7 (6–5)	Gill Coliseum (7,376); Corvallis, OR
02/10/2011; 7:00 pm		Stanford	L 62–75	16–8 (6–6)	Beasley Coliseum (6,517); Pullman, WA
02/12/2011; 7:00 pm		California	W 75–71	17–8 (7–6)	Beasley Coliseum (7,640); Pullman, WA
02/17/2011; 11:00 am, FSN		at No. 13 Arizona	L 70–79	17–9 (7–7)	McKale Center (14,456); Tucson, Arizona
02/19/2011; 5:30 pm, FSNNW		at Arizona State	L 69–71	17–10 (7–8)	Wells Fargo Arena (5,153); Tempe, AZ
02/27/2011; 7:00 pm, FSN		at Washington	W 80–69	18–10 (8–8)	Alaska Airlines Arena (10,000); Seattle, WA
03/03/2011; 7:00 pm		USC	W 85–77	19–10 (9–8)	Beasley Coliseum (7,126); Pullman, WA
03/05/2011; 2:30 pm, FSN		UCLA	L 54–58 ^{OT}	19–11 (9–9)	Beasley Coliseum (9,317); Pullman, WA
Pac-10 tournament
03/10/2011; 8:30 pm, FSN	(6)	vs. (3) Washington; Pac-10 Quarterfinals	L 87–89	19–12	Staples Center (12,191); Los Angeles, CA
NIT
03/16/2011*; 7:00 pm, ESPNU	(2 BC)	(7 BC) Long Beach State; NIT First Round	W 85–74	20–12	Beasley Coliseum (4,213); Pullman, WA
03/21/2011*; 8:30 pm, ESPN2	(2 BC)	(3 BC) Oklahoma State; NIT Second Round	W 74–64	21–12	Beasley Coliseum (5,201); Pullman, WA
03/23/2011*; 8:00 pm, ESPN2	(2 BC)	(4 BC) Northwestern; NIT Quarterfinals	W 69–66 ^{OT}	22–12	Beasley Coliseum (5,905); Pullman, WA
03/29/2011*; 4:00 pm, ESPN2	(2 BC)	vs. No. 4 VT Wichita State; NIT Semifinals	L 44–75	22–13	Madison Square Garden (6,082); New York City, NY
*Non-conference game. ^{#}Rankings from Coaches' Poll. (#) Tournament seedings in parentheses. BC=NIT Boston College bracket. VT=NIT Virginia Tech Bracket. All times are in Pacific Time.

== Notes ==
- December 29, 2010 – Washington State kicks off Pac-10 play at UCLA in Pauley Pavilion.
- January 15, 2011 – Reggie Moore was suspended for one game on January 15 after being arrested for possession of marijuana and drug paraphernalia.
- March 5, 2011 – Klay Thompson was suspended for one game on March 5 after being issued a misdemeanor criminal citation for marijuana possession.
- March 12, 2011 – Thompson was named to the Pac-10 All Tournament Team.
- March 13, 2011 – The Cougars were selected to participate in the 2011 NIT to play Long Beach State on March 16, 2011.
- March 22, 2011 – DeAngelo Casto was suspended for the NIT Quarterfinals against Northwestern on March 22 for being cited with possession of marijuana but would later have his suspension lifted when Athletic Director Bill Moos said that "new information prompted him to lift the suspension."
