= 2010–11 USC Trojans men's basketball team =

American college basketball season

2010–11 USC Trojans men's basketball

NCAA tournament, First Four
- Conference: Pacific-10 Conference
- Record: 19–15 (10–8 Pac-10)
- Head coach: Kevin O'Neill
- Assistant coaches: Bob Cantu; Dieter Horton; Tony Miller
- Home arena: Galen Center

2010–11 Pacific-10 Conference men's basketball standings
| | Conf. | | | | Overall |
| Team | W | | L | PCT | W | | L | PCT |
|---|---|---|---|---|---|---|---|---|
| No. 17 Arizona | 14 | – | 4 | .778 | 30 | – | 8 | .789 |
| UCLA | 13 | – | 5 | .722 | 23 | – | 11 | .676 |
| No. 23 Washington † | 11 | – | 7 | .611 | 24 | – | 11 | .686 |
| USC | 10 | – | 8 | .556 | 19 | – | 15 | .559 |
| California | 10 | – | 8 | .556 | 18 | – | 15 | .545 |
| Washington State | 9 | – | 9 | .500 | 22 | – | 13 | .629 |
| Oregon | 7 | – | 11 | .389 | 21 | – | 18 | .538 |
| Stanford | 7 | – | 11 | .389 | 15 | – | 16 | .484 |
| Oregon State | 5 | – | 13 | .278 | 11 | – | 20 | .355 |
| Arizona State | 4 | – | 14 | .222 | 12 | – | 19 | .387 |
† Conference tournament winner As of March 30, 2011; Rankings from AP poll

The 2010–11 USC Trojans men's basketball team represented the University of Southern California during the 2010–11 NCAA Division I men's basketball season. The Trojans, led by second year head coach Kevin O'Neill, played their home games at the Galen Center and were members of the Pacific-10 Conference. They finished the season 19–15, 10–8 in Pac-10 play. They lost in the semifinals of the 2011 Pacific-10 Conference men's basketball tournament to Arizona. They received an at-large bid to the 2011 NCAA Division I men's basketball tournament where they lost in the new First Four round to VCU.

== Class of 2010 ==
College recruiting
| Name | Hometown | School | Height | Weight | Commit date |
|---|---|---|---|---|---|
| Garrett Jackson; SF | Portland, Oregon | Westview HS | 6 ft 6 in (1.98 m) | 195 lb (88 kg) | Sep 10, 2009 |
| Garrett Jackson; SF | Recruit ratings: Scout: Rivals: (90) | | | | |
| Bryce Jones; SF | Woodland Hills, California | William Howard Taft HS | 6 ft 4 in (1.93 m) | 175 lb (79 kg) | Sep 3, 2009 |
| Bryce Jones; SF | Recruit ratings: Scout: Rivals: (94) | | | | |
| Maurice Jones; SG | Saginaw, Michigan | Arthur Hill HS | 5 ft 7 in (1.70 m) | 155 lb (70 kg) | Sep 27, 2009 |
| Maurice Jones; SG | Recruit ratings: Scout: Rivals: (93) | | | | |
| Curtis Washington; C | Elizabethtown, KY | Elizabethtown HS | 6 ft 8 in (2.03 m) | 215 lb (98 kg) | Jul 8, 2009 |
| Curtis Washington; C | Recruit ratings: Scout: Rivals: (87) | | | | |
Overall Recruiting Rankings: Scout – UR Rivals – UR ESPN – UR

== Roster ==
| Number | Name | Position | Height | Weight | Year | Hometown |
|---|---|---|---|---|---|---|
| 1 | Alex Stepheson | Forward | 6–10 | 250 | Senior | Los Angeles, California |
| 2 | Jio Fontan | Guard | 6–0 | 175 | Junior | Paterson, New Jersey |
| 4 | Tyler Sugiyama | Guard | 5–10 | 150 | Freshman | Winnetka, Illinois |
| 5 | Nikola Vucevic | Forward | 6–10 | 240 | Junior | Bar, Montenegro |
| 10 | Maurice Jones | Guard | 5–7 | 155 | Freshman | Saginaw, Michigan |
| 14 | Donte Smith | Guard | 5–11 | 180 | Senior | Pomona, California |
| 20 | Eric Strangis | Guard | 6–4 | 190 | Junior | La Crescenta, California |
| 21 | Aaron Fuller | Forward | 6–6 | 235 | Junior | Mesa, Arizona |
| 22 | Evan Smith | Forward | 6–7 | 225 | Sophomore | Calabasas, California |
| 33 | Garrett Jackson | Forward | 6–6 | 215 | Freshman | Portland, Oregon |
| 3 | Brandun Williams | Guard | 6-0 | 175 | Sophomore | Chicago, Illinois |
| 42 | Curtis Washington | Forward | 6–10 | 230 | Freshman | Elizabethtown, Kentucky |
| 43 | Marcus Simmons | Guard | 6–6 | 220 | Senior | Alexandria, Louisiana |

== 2010–11 Schedule and results ==
| Date time, TV | Rank^{#} | Opponent^{#} | Result | Record | Site (attendance) city, state |
Exhibition
| 11/06/2010*; 2:00 pm | | Point Loma Nazarene | W 69–49 | — | Galen Center; Los Angeles, CA |
Regular season
| 11/13/2010*; 1:00 pm | | UC Irvine | W 62–49 | 1–0 | Galen Center (3,125); Los Angeles, CA |
| 11/15/2010*; 7:30 pm | | Santa Clara | W 86–73 | 2–0 | Galen Center (2,912); Los Angeles, CA |
| 11/17/2010*; 7:30 pm | | Rider; Hall of Fame Tip-Off | L 57–77 | 2–1 | Galen Center (3,187); Los Angeles, CA |
| 11/20/2010*; 2:00 pm | | vs. Bradley; Hall of Fame Tip-Off | L 63–64 | 2–2 | MassMutual Center; Springfield, MA |
| 11/21/2010*; 11:30 am | | vs. New Mexico State; Hall of Fame Tip-Off | W 80–61 | 3–2 | MassMutual Center; Springfield, MA |
| 11/24/2010*; 7:30 pm | | Cal State Fullerton | W 81–54 | 4–2 | Galen Center (3,821); Los Angeles, CA |
| 11/27/2010*; 3:00 pm, FSN | | at Nebraska; Big 12/Pac-10 Hardwood Series | L 58–60 | 4–3 | Bob Devaney Sports Center (8,756); Lincoln, NE |
| 11/29/2010*; 5:00 pm, The Mtn. | | at TCU | L 69–81 | 4–4 | Daniel-Meyer Coliseum (4,076); Fort Worth, TX |
| 12/05/2010*; 7:30 pm, FSN | | No. 20 Texas; Big 12/Pac-10 Hardwood Series | W 73–56 | 5–4 | Galen Center (4,127); Los Angeles, CA |
| 12/11/2010*; 1:00 pm, FS West | | Northern Arizona | W 60–52 | 6–4 | Galen Center (3,794); Los Angeles, CA |
| 12/18/2010*; 9:00 am, ESPN | | at No. 3 Kansas | L 68–70 | 6–5 | Allen Fieldhouse (16,300); Lawrence, KS |
| 12/21/2010*; 4:00 pm, Prime Ticket | | at No. 18 Tennessee | W 65–64 | 7–5 | Thompson-Boling Arena (19,030); Knoxville, TN |
| 12/23/2010*; 5:30 pm | | Lehigh | W 76–49 | 8–5 | Galen Center (3,562); Los Angeles, CA |
| 12/29/2010; 7:30 pm | | Washington | L 67–73 ^{OT} | 8–6 (0–1) | Galen Center (5,584); Los Angeles, CA |
| 12/31/2010; 3:00 pm, FS West | | Washington State | W 60–56 | 9–6 (1–1) | Galen Center (3,581); Los Angeles, CA |
| 01/09/2011; 7:30 pm, FSN | | UCLA | W 63–52 | 10–6 (2–1) | Galen Center (10,258); Los Angeles, CA |
| 01/13/2011; 7:30 pm, FSN | | at Oregon | L 62–68 | 10–7 (2–2) | Matthew Knight Arena (12,364); Eugene, OR |
| 01/15/2011; 7:30 pm | | at Oregon State | L 76–80 | 10–8 (2–3) | Gill Coliseum (7,257); Corvallis, OR |
| 01/20/2011; 7:30 pm | | Stanford | W 65–42 | 11–8 (3–3) | Galen Center (3,794); Los Angeles, CA |
| 01/22/2011; 8:00 pm, FS West | | California | L 66–68 | 11–9 (3–4) | Galen Center (5,124); Los Angeles, CA |
| 01/27/2011; 5:30 pm | | at Arizona State | W 63–61 | 12–9 (4–4) | Wells Fargo Arena (7,638); Tempe, AZ |
| 01/29/2011; 4:30 pm, Prime Ticket | | at Arizona | L 73–82 | 12–10 (4–5) | McKale Center (13,613); Tucson, AZ |
| 02/02/2011; 8:00 pm, FSN | | at UCLA | L 50–64 | 12–11 (4–6) | Pauley Pavilion (10,419); Los Angeles, CA |
| 02/10/2011; 8:00 pm, FSN | | Oregon State | W 67–56 | 13–11 (5–6) | Galen Center (3,853); Los Angeles, CA |
| 02/12/2011; 7:30 pm, Prime Ticket | | Oregon | L 51–61 | 13–12 (5–7) | Galen Center (4,421); Los Angeles, CA |
| 02/17/2011; 7:30 pm | | at California | W 78–75 | 14–12 (6–7) | Haas Pavilion (7,743); Berkeley, CA |
| 02/19/2011; 7:30 pm, FS West | | at Stanford | W 69–53 | 15–12 (7–7) | Maples Pavilion (5,896); Stanford, CA |
| 02/24/2011; 7:30 pm | | No. 10 Arizona | W 65–57 | 16–12 (8–7) | Galen Center (6,857); Los Angeles, CA |
| 02/26/2011; 4:30 pm, Prime Ticket | | Arizona State | W 62–46 | 17–12 (9–7) | Galen Center (6,621); Los Angeles, CA |
| 03/03/2011; 7:00 pm | | at Washington State | L 77–85 | 17–13 (9–8) | Beasley Coliseum (7,126); Pullman, WA |
| 03/05/2011; 7:30 pm, FSN | | at Washington | W 62–60 | 18–13 (10–8) | Alaska Airlines Arena (10,000); Seattle, WA |
Pac-10 tournament
| 03/10/2011; 12:00 pm, FSN | (4) | vs. (5) California; Pac-10 Quarterfinals | W 70–56 | 19–13 | Staples Center (10,782); Los Angeles, CA |
| 03/11/2011; 6:00 pm, FSN | (4) | vs. (1) No. 16 Arizona; Pac-10 Semifinals | L 62–67 | 19–14 | Staples Center (13,190); Los Angeles, CA |
NCAA tournament
| 03/16/2011*; 6:00 pm, truTV | (11 SW) | vs. (11 SW) VCU; NCAA First Four | L 46–59 | 19–15 | UD Arena (10,192); Dayton OH |
*Non-conference game. ^{#}Rankings from AP Poll. (#) Tournament seedings in parentheses. SW=NCAA Southwest Regional. All times are in Pacific Time.

== Notes ==
- March 11, 2011 – Coach Kevin O'Neill was suspended for USC's game against Arizona. O'Neill had a verbal altercation with a Wildcats booster following the Wednesday game against California.
