= 2010–11 Duke Blue Devils men's basketball team =

American college basketball season

2010–11 Duke Blue Devils men's basketball

CBE Classic champions ACC Tournament champions

NCAA tournament, Sweet Sixteen
- Conference: Atlantic Coast Conference

Ranking
- Coaches: No. 7
- AP: No. 3
- Record: 32–5 (13–3 ACC)
- Head coach: Mike Krzyzewski (31st
- Assistant coach: Nate James
- Home arena: Cameron Indoor Stadium

2010–11 ACC men's basketball standings
	Conf.				Overall
Team	W		L	PCT	W		L	PCT
No. 7 North Carolina	14	–	2	.875	29	–	8	.784
No. 3 Duke †	13	–	3	.813	32	–	5	.865
Florida State	11	–	5	.688	23	–	11	.676
Clemson	9	–	7	.563	22	–	12	.647
Boston College	9	–	7	.563	21	–	13	.618
Virginia Tech	9	–	7	.563	22	–	12	.647
Maryland	7	–	9	.438	19	–	14	.576
Virginia	7	–	9	.438	16	–	15	.516
Miami (FL)	6	–	10	.375	21	–	15	.583
NC State	5	–	11	.313	15	–	16	.484
Georgia Tech	5	–	11	.313	13	–	18	.419
Wake Forest	1	–	15	.063	8	–	24	.250
† 2011 ACC tournament winner As of March 27, 2011; Rankings from AP poll

The 2010–11 Duke Blue Devils men's basketball team represented Duke University in the 2010–11 NCAA Division I men's basketball season. Returning as head coach was Hall of Famer Mike Krzyzewski. The team played their home games at Cameron Indoor Stadium in Durham, North Carolina and were members of the Atlantic Coast Conference. They finished the regular season with a record of 30–4, ranked #1 in the media polls a total of eleven weeks during the season. They also won the ACC tournament for the third consecutive year. As the #1 seed in the west region of the 2011 NCAA Division I men's basketball tournament, they defeated Hampton in the second round and Michigan in the third round to advance to the Sweet Sixteen, where they were defeated by Arizona to finish the season 32–5.

== Previous season ==
The team finished 2010 with a 35–5 record, becoming the ACC regular season co-champion, ACC tournament champion, and earning a #1 seed in the 2010 NCAA Division I men's basketball tournament. The Blue Devils beat Butler in the championship game 61–59 to win the fourth national championship in school history.

== Pre-season ==
=== Recruiting ===
College recruiting
Name	Hometown	School	Height	Weight	Commit date
Josh Hairston; PF	Fredericksburg, VA	Montrose Christian School (MD)	6 ft 8 in (2.03 m)	205 lb (93 kg)	Sep 13, 2008
Josh Hairston; PF	Recruit ratings: Scout: Rivals: ESPN:				
Kyrie Irving; PG	West Orange, NJ	St. Patrick High School (NJ)	6 ft 1 in (1.85 m)	173 lb (78 kg)	Oct 22, 2009
Kyrie Irving; PG	Recruit ratings: Scout: Rivals: ESPN:				
Tyler Thornton; PG	Washington, DC	Gonzaga College High School	6 ft 2 in (1.88 m)	180 lb (82 kg)	Sep 13, 2008
Tyler Thornton; PG	Recruit ratings: Scout: Rivals: ESPN:				
Overall recruit ranking: Scout: 8 Rivals: 10 ESPN: 6
Note: In many cases, Scout, Rivals, 247Sports, On3, and ESPN may conflict in their listings of height and weight.; In these cases, the average was taken. ESPN grades are on a 100-point scale.; Sources: "Duke Basketball Commitments". Rivals.; "2010 Duke Basketball Commits". Scout.; "ESPN". ESPN.; "Scout.com Team Recruiting Rankings". Scout.; "2010 Team Ranking". Rivals.

== Roster ==
2010–11 Duke Blue Devils men's basketball team
Players
Coaches

Pos.	#	Name	Height	Weight	Year	Previous school	Hometown
G	3	Tyler Thornton	6 ft 2 in (1.88 m)	190 lb (86 kg)	Fr	Gonzaga	Washington, D.C.
F	5	Mason Plumlee	6 ft 10 in (2.08 m)	235 lb (107 kg)	So	Christ School	Warsaw, IN
F	15	Josh Hairston	6 ft 8 in (2.03 m)	235 lb (107 kg)	Fr	Montrose Christian	Fredericksburg, VA
G	34	Andre Dawkins	6 ft 5 in (1.96 m)	215 lb (98 kg)	So	Atlantic Shores Christian	Chesapeake, VA
F	21	Miles Plumlee	6 ft 10 in (2.08 m)	245 lb (111 kg)	Jr	Christ School	Warsaw, IN
G	30	Seth Curry	6 ft 2 in (1.88 m)	185 lb (84 kg)	So	Charlotte Christian	Charlotte, NC
F	34	Ryan Kelly	6 ft 11 in (2.11 m)	230 lb (104 kg)	So	Ravenscroft	Raleigh, NC
F	52	Todd Zafirovski	6 ft 9 in (2.06 m)	245 lb (111 kg)	So	Lake Forest Academy	Lake Forest, IL
G	2	Nolan Smith	6 ft 2 in (1.88 m)	185 lb (84 kg)	Sr	Oak Hill Academy	Upper Marlboro, MD
F	12	Kyle Singler	6 ft 8 in (2.03 m)	230 lb (104 kg)	Sr	South Medford	Medford, OR
G	1	Kyrie Irving	6 ft 2 in (1.88 m)	180 lb (82 kg)	Fr	Montclair Kimberley Academy	West Orange, NJ
G	53	Casey Peters	6 ft 4 in (1.93 m)	200 lb (91 kg)	Sr	Red Bank Regional	Red Bank, NJ

Head coach

- Mike Krzyzewski

Assistant coach(es)

- Chris Collins
- Steve Wojciechowski

Legend

- (C) Team captain
- (S) Suspended
- (I) Ineligible
- (W) Walk-on
- Injured
- Current redshirt

== Schedule ==
Date time, TV	Rank^{#}	Opponent^{#}	Result	Record	High points	High rebounds	High assists	Site (attendance) city, state
Fri, Oct 15; 7:30 pm		Blue-White Scrimmage						Cameron Indoor Stadium (N/A); Durham, NC
Exhibition
Sat, Oct 23*; 7:00 pm		St. Augustine's	W 141–68		–	–	–	Cameron Indoor Stadium (N/A); Durham, NC
Thu, Nov 4*; 7:00 pm	No. 1	Cal Poly Pomona	W 81–60		–	–	–	Cameron Indoor Stadium (9,314); Durham, NC
Regular season
Sun, Nov 14*; 5:00 pm, ESPNU	No. 1	Princeton; CBE Classic	W 97–60	1–0	26 – Smith	4 – Tied	9 – Irving	Cameron Indoor Stadium (9,314); Durham, NC
Tue, Nov 16*; 7:30 pm, ESPNU	No. 1	Miami (OH); CBE Classic	W 79–45	2–0	17 – Curry	14 – Ma. Plumlee	7 – Smith	Cameron Indoor Stadium (9,314); Durham, NC
Fri, Nov 19*; 8:30 pm, ESPN3.com	No. 1	Colgate	W 110–58	3–0	18 – Singler	9 – Singler	9 – Tied	Cameron Indoor Stadium (9,314); Durham, NC
Mon, Nov 22*; 7:30 pm, ESPN2	No. 1	vs. Marquette; CBE Classic – Semifinals	W 82–77	4–0	25 – Ma. Plumlee	12 – Ma. Plumlee	7 – Irving	Sprint Center (N/A); Kansas City, MO
Tue, Nov 23*; 10:15 pm, ESPN	No. 1	vs. No. 4 Kansas State; CBE Classic – Championship	W 82–68	5–0	17 – Tied	5 – Tied	6 – Irving	Sprint Center (18,696); Kansas City, MO
Sat, Nov 27*; 4:00 pm, FSN	No. 1	vs. Oregon	W 98–71	6–0	30 – Singler	12 – Ma. Plumlee	5 – Smith	Rose Garden (12,914); Portland, OR
Wed, Dec 1*; 9:30 pm, ESPN	No. 1	No. 6 Michigan State; ACC – Big Ten Challenge	W 84–79	7–0	31 – Irving	10 – Ma. Plumlee	5 – Smith	Cameron Indoor Stadium (9,314); Durham, NC
Sat, Dec 4*; 3:15 pm, ESPN	No. 1	vs. Butler; CARQUEST Auto Parts Classic	W 82–70	8–0	24 – Smith	8 – Dawkins	3 – Curry	Izod Center (14,215); East Rutherford, NJ
Wed, Dec 8*; 9:00 pm, ESPN2	No. 1	Bradley	W 83–48	9–0	28 – Dawkins	7 – Ma. Plumlee	10 – Smith	Cameron Indoor Stadium (9,314); Durham, NC
Sat, Dec 11*; 12:00 pm, CBS	No. 1	Saint Louis	W 84–47	10–0	22 – Smith	9 – Mi. Plumlee	6 – Curry	Cameron Indoor Stadium (9,314); Durham, NC
Mon, Dec 20*; 7:00 pm, FSS	No. 1	Elon	W 98–72	11–0	24 – Singler	5 – Tied	8 – Mi. Plumlee	Cameron Indoor Stadium (9,314); Durham, NC
Wed, Dec 29*; 7:00 pm, ESPNU	No. 1	at UNC Greensboro	W 108–62	12–0	27 – Singler	6 – Singler	9 – Smith	Greensboro Coliseum (22,178); Greensboro, NC
Sun, Jan 2; 7:45 pm, FSN	No. 1	Miami (FL)	W 74–63	13–0 (1–0)	28 – Smith	10 – Ma. Plumlee	5 – Smith	Cameron Indoor Stadium (9,314); Durham, NC
Wed, Jan 5*; 7:00 pm, ESPN2	No. 1	UAB	W 85–64	14–0	33 – Smith	8 – Tied	5 – Smith	Cameron Indoor Stadium (9,314); Durham, NC
Sun, Jan 9; 8:00 pm, FSN	No. 1	Maryland; Duke–Maryland rivalry	W 71–64	15–0 (2–0)	25 – Singler	10 – Singler	8 – Smith	Cameron Indoor Stadium (9,314); Durham, NC
Wed, Jan 12; 9:00 pm, ESPN	No. 1	at Florida State	L 61–66	15–1 (2–1)	20 – Singler	14 – Ma. Plumlee	5 – Smith	Donald L. Tucker Center (12,100); Tallahassee, FL
Sat, Jan 15; 2:00 pm, ESPN	No. 1	Virginia	W 76–60	16–1 (3–1)	29 – Smith	16 – Ma. Plumlee	6 – Smith	Cameron Indoor Stadium (9,314); Durham, NC
Wed, Jan 19; 7:00 pm, ESPN	No. 4	at NC State	W 92–78	17–1 (4–1)	22 – Smith	10 – Ma. Plumlee	6 – Smith	RBC Center (19,387); Raleigh, NC
Sat, Jan 22; 4:00 pm, ESPN	No. 4	at Wake Forest	W 83–59	18–1 (5–1)	24 – Singler	10 – Ma. Plumlee	4 – Singler	LJVM Coliseum (14,107); Winston-Salem, NC
Thu, Jan 27; 8:00 pm, Raycom	No. 3	Boston College	W 84–68	19–1 (6–1)	28 – Smith	12 – Ma. Plumlee	8 – Smith	Cameron Indoor Stadium (9,314); Durham, NC
Sun, Jan 30*; 1:00 pm, CBS	No. 3	at St. John's	L 78–93	19–2	32 – Smith	9 – Kelly	4 – Smith	Madison Square Garden (19,353); New York, NY
Wed, Feb 2; 9:00 pm, ESPN	No. 5	at Maryland; Duke–Maryland rivalry	W 80–62	20–2 (7–1)	22 – Singler	11 – Ma. Plumlee	5 – Curry	Comcast Center (17,950); College Park, MD
Sat, Feb 5; 6:00 pm, ESPN	No. 5	NC State	W 76–52	21–2 (8–1)	20 – Smith	12 – Ma. Plumlee	7 – Smith	Cameron Indoor Stadium (9,314); Durham, NC
Wed, Feb 9; 9:00 pm, ESPN	No. 5	No. 20 North Carolina; Carolina–Duke rivalry	W 79–73	22–2 (9–1)	34 – Smith	9 – Mi. Plumlee	5 – Curry	Cameron Indoor Stadium (9,314); Durham, NC
Sun, Feb 13; 6:45 pm, FSN	No. 5	at Miami (FL)	W 81–71	23–2 (10–1)	18 – Smith	7 – Singler	5 – Smith	BankUnited Center (7,972); Coral Gables, FL
Wed, Feb 16; 7:00 pm, ESPN	No. 5	at Virginia	W 56–41	24–2 (11–1)	22 – Smith	9 – Ma. Plumlee	4 – Smith	John Paul Jones Arena (14,149); Charlottesville, VA
Sun, Feb 20; 7:45 pm, FSN	No. 5	Georgia Tech	W 79–57	25–2 (12–1)	28 – Smith	9 – Tied	6 – Curry	Cameron Indoor Stadium (9,314); Durham, NC
Wed, Feb 23*; 7:00 pm, ESPN2	No. 1	No. 24 Temple	W 78–61	26–2	28 – Singler	13 – Ma. Plumlee	4 – Smith	Cameron Indoor Stadium (9,314); Durham, NC
Sat, Feb 26; 9:00 pm, ESPN	No. 1	at Virginia Tech; College GameDay	L 60–64	26–3 (12–2)	22 – Singler	12 – Singler	2 – Smith	Cassell Coliseum (9,847); Blacksburg, VA
Wed, Mar 2; 9:00 pm, ESPN	No. 4	Clemson	W 70–59	27–3 (13–2)	21 – Smith	11 – Singler	7 – Smith	Cameron Indoor Stadium (9,314); Durham, NC
Sat, Mar 5; 8:00 pm, CBS	No. 4	at No. 13 North Carolina; Carolina–Duke rivalry	L 67–81	27–4 (13–3)	30 – Smith	11 – Mi. Plumlee	3 – Smith	Dean Smith Center (21,750); Chapel Hill, NC
ACC Tournament
Fri, Mar 11; 7:00 pm, ESPN2/ Raycom	(2) No. 5	vs. (7) Maryland; Quarterfinals	W 87–71	28–4	29 – Singler	11 – Ma. Plumlee	5 – Ma. Plumlee	Greensboro Coliseum (23,381); Greensboro, NC
Sat, Mar 12; 3:00 pm, ESPN/ Raycom	(2) No. 5	vs. (6) Virginia Tech; Semifinals	W 77–63	29–4	27 – Smith	11 – Singler	6 – Smith	Greensboro Coliseum (23,381); Greensboro, NC
Sun, Mar 13; 1:00 pm, ESPN/ Raycom	(2) No. 5	vs. (1) No. 6 North Carolina; Championship Game	W 75–58	30–4	20 – Smith	8 – Singler	10 – Smith	Greensboro Coliseum (23,381); Greensboro, NC
NCAA tournament
Fri, March 18*; 3:10 pm, truTV	(1 W) No. 3	vs. (16 W) Hampton; Second round	W 87–45	31–4	14 – Irving	13 – Mi. Plumlee	7 – Smith	Time Warner Cable Arena (16,829); Charlotte, NC
Sun, March 20*; 2:45 pm, CBS	(1 W) No. 3	vs. (8 W) Michigan; Third round	W 73–71	32–4	24 – Smith	8 – Singler	4 – Singler	Time Warner Cable Arena (18,329); Charlotte, NC
Thu, March 24*; 9:45 pm, CBS	(1 W) No. 3	vs. (5 W) No. 17 Arizona; Sweet Sixteen	L 77–93	32–5	28 – Irving	8 – Singler	3 – Tied	Honda Center (17,890); Anaheim, CA
*Non-conference game. ^{#}Rankings from AP. (#) Tournament seedings in parentheses. W=NCAA West Region. All times are in Eastern Time.

== Game notes – NCAA tournament ==
=== Second round: Hampton ===
Teams	1st	2nd	Final
(16) HAMP	22	23	45
(1) DUKE	39	48	87

Duke opened the 2011 NCAA Tournament with a matchup against #16 seed Hampton. Duke had a commanding 39–22 lead going into halftime. As the game continued, Duke built a larger margin and easily took the first game of the tournament, beating Hampton 87–45. After Kyrie Irving suffered a toe injury in December and missed 26 games, he made his return against Hampton. After a slow start, Irving led the team in scoring with 14 points while playing 20 minutes.

=== Third round: Michigan ===
Teams	1st	2nd	Final
(8) MICH	33	38	71
(1) DUKE	37	36	73

Duke continued their 2011 NCAA Tournament bid with a third-round matchup with the Michigan Wolverines. Duke opened the game going back and forth with Michigan, going into halftime with a 38–33 lead. However, even after leading by 15 points midway through the second half, the Wolverines would not go away. In the game's final seconds, it was Duke who prevailed behind Nolan Smith's 24 and beat Michigan 73–71, moving them on to the Sweet Sixteen in Anaheim. This victory also gave coach Mike Krzyzewski his 900th career victory, becoming only the fourth coach to accomplish this feat.

=== Regional semifinal: Arizona ===
Teams	1st	2nd	Final
(5) ARIZ	38	55	93
(1) DUKE	44	33	77

Duke played well in the first half and was up by 6 points at halftime. Arizona was only kept within range by a stellar performance by Wildcats forward Derrick Williams, who scored 25 of his 32 points in the first half. In the second half, Williams' teammates came alive as Arizona went on a 19–2 run from which Duke was unable to recover.

== Rankings ==
Ranking movements Legend: ██ Increase in ranking ██ Decrease in ranking т = Tied with team above or below
	Week																			
Poll	Pre	1	2	3	4	5	6	7	8	9	10	11	12	13	14	15	16	17	18	Final
AP	1	1	1	1	1	1	1	1	1	1	4	3	5	5	5	1	4T	5	3	
Coaches	1	1	1	1	1	1	1	1	1	1	5	3	5	5	5	1	4	5	3	
