= 2010–11 Arizona State Sun Devils men's basketball team =

American college basketball season

2010–11 Arizona State Sun Devils men's basketball
- Conference: Pacific-10 Conference
- Record: 12–19 (4–14 Pac-10)
- Head coach: Herb Sendek
- Assistant coaches: Dedrique Taylor; Scott Pera; Lamont Smith
- Home arena: Wells Fargo Arena

2010–11 Pacific-10 Conference men's basketball standings
	Conf.				Overall
Team	W		L	PCT	W		L	PCT
No. 17 Arizona	14	–	4	.778	30	–	8	.789
UCLA	13	–	5	.722	23	–	11	.676
No. 23 Washington †	11	–	7	.611	24	–	11	.686
USC	10	–	8	.556	19	–	15	.559
California	10	–	8	.556	18	–	15	.545
Washington State	9	–	9	.500	22	–	13	.629
Oregon	7	–	11	.389	21	–	18	.538
Stanford	7	–	11	.389	15	–	16	.484
Oregon State	5	–	13	.278	11	–	20	.355
Arizona State	4	–	14	.222	12	–	19	.387
† Conference tournament winner As of March 30, 2011; Rankings from AP poll

The 2010–11 Arizona State Sun Devils men's basketball team represented Arizona State University during the 2010–11 NCAA Division I men's basketball season. The head coach was Herb Sendek. The Sun Devils played their home games at the Wells Fargo Arena and are members of the Pacific-10 Conference. The Sun Devils finished with 12–19, 4–14 in Pac-10 play and lost the first round of the 2011 Pacific-10 Conference men's basketball tournament to Oregon.

== Roster ==
Number	Name	Position	Height	Weight	Year	Hometown	High School/Last College
0	Carrick Felix	Guard/Forward	6–6	196	Sophomore	Goodyear, AZ	College of Southern Idaho/Millennium HS
1	Corey Hawkins	Guard	6–1	196	Freshman	Goodyear, AZ	Estrella Foothills High School
2	Brandon Dunson	Guard	6–1	181	Junior	Bloomington, IL	Wabash Valley CC/Bloomington Central Catholic
3	Ty Abbott	Guard	6–3	205	Senior	Phoenix, AZ	Desert Vista High School
5	Kyle Cain	Forward	6–7	210	Freshman	Calumet City, IL	New Hampton School
10	Jamelle McMillan	Guard	6–2	180	Senior	Seattle, WA	O'Dea HS
11	William Young	Guard	5–9	165	Freshman	Houston, TX	St. Johns HS
13	Jordan Bachynski	Center	7–2	243	Freshman	Calgary, AB	Centennial HS
15	Chanse Creekmur	Guard/Forward	6–5	216	Freshman	Marshalltown, IA	Marshalltown HS
21	Keala King	Guard	6–4	201	Freshman	Compton, CA	Mater Dei HS
22	Michael Atwater	Forward	6–5	189	Freshman	Lakewood, CA	Foothill HS
23	Ruslan Pateev	Center	7–0	249	Sophomore	Moscow, Russia	Montverde Academy
24	Trent Lockett	Guard	6–4	210	Sophomore	Golden Valley, MN	Hopkins HS
25	Marcus Jackson	Guard	6–1	183	Sophomore	Sacramento, CA	Sheldon HS
30	Rihards Kuksiks	Guard/Forward	6–6	206	Senior	Riga, Latvia	Florida Air Academy
33	Dave Whitmore	Forward	6–6	215	Freshman	Tempe, AZ	Corona Del Sol HS
40	Adam Boone	Guard	6–5	200	Freshman	San Francisco, CA	The Branson School

== Schedule ==
Date time, TV	Rank^{#}	Opponent^{#}	Result	Record	Site (attendance) city, state
Regular season
November 16, 2010*; 8:00 pm, Versus		at New Mexico	L 62–76	0–1	The Pit (15,239); Albuquerque, NM
November 20, 2010*; 2:00 pm		UAB	W 69–66	1–1	Wells Fargo Arena (8,642); Tempe, AZ
November 25, 2010*; 7:00 pm, FSAZ		vs. Houston Baptist; Great Alaska Shootout First Round	W 73–55	2–1	Sullivan Arena (4,775); Anchorage, AK
November 26, 2010*; 10:00 pm, FSAZ		vs. Weber State; Great Alaska Shootout Semifinals	W 59–58	3–1	Sullivan Arena (5,038); Anchorage, AK
November 27, 2010*; 10:00 pm, FSAZ		vs. St. John's; Great Alaska Shootout Championship	L 58–67	3–2	Sullivan Arena (5,662); Anchorage, AK
December 2, 2010*; 5:00 pm, ESPN2		at No. 11 Baylor; Big 12/Pac-10 Hardwood Series	L 54–68	3–3	Ferrell Center (7,083); Waco, TX
December 5, 2010*; 12:00 pm, FSAZ		Richmond	L 61–67	3–4	Wells Fargo Arena (7,731); Tempe, AZ
December 11, 2010*; 12:00 pm		Gardner–Webb	W 71–48	4–4	Wells Fargo Arena (5,216); Tempe, AZ
December 17, 2010*; 7:00 pm, ESPNU		at Nevada	W 78–75	5–4	Lawlor Events Center (3,666); Reno, NV
December 21, 2010*; 5:00 pm, FSAZ		Long Beach State	W 72–55	6–4	Well Fargo Arena (6,214); Tempe, AZ
December 23, 2010*; 12:00 pm, FSAZ		North Carolina A&T	W 56–50	7–4	Well Fargo Arena (6,154); Tempe, AZ
December 30, 2010; 8:30 pm, FSAZ		at Oregon State	L 58–80	7–5 (0–1)	Gill Coliseum (4,574); Corvallis, OR
January 1, 2011; 8:00 pm		at Oregon	W 60–55	8–5 (1–1)	McArthur Court (7,165); Eugene, OR
January 6, 2011; 6:30 pm, FSAZ		Stanford	L 41–55	8–6 (1–2)	Well Fargo Arena (6,660); Tempe, AZ
January 8, 2011; 12:30 pm, FSN		California	L 61–65	8–7 (1–3)	Well Fargo Arena (6,586); Tempe, AZ
January 12, 2011*; 6:30 pm, FSAZ		Tulsa	W 69–59	9–7	Well Fargo Arena (6,386); Tempe, AZ
January 15, 2011; 12:30 pm, FSN		at Arizona	L 69–80	9–8 (1–4)	McKale Center (14,601); Tucson, AZ
January 20, 2011; 8:00 pm		at Washington State	L 61–78	9–9 (1–5)	Beasley Coliseum (7,157); Pullman, WA
January 22, 2011; 2:00 pm, FSN		at No. 20 Washington	L 75–88	9–10 (1–6)	Alaska Airlines Arena (9,905); Seattle, WA
January 27, 2011; 6:30 pm		USC	L 61–63	9–11 (1–7)	Wells Fargo Arena (7,638); Tempe, AZ
January 29, 2011; 1:30 pm, FSN		UCLA	L 72–73 ^{OT}	9–12 (1–8)	Wells Fargo Arena (7,086); Tempe, AZ
February 3, 2011; 9:00 pm, FSN		at California	L 62–66	9–13 (1–9)	Haas Pavilion (7,129); Berkeley, CA
February 5, 2011; 4:00 pm, FSN		at Stanford	L 75–83	9–14 (1–10)	Maples Pavilion (5,217); Stanford, CA
February 13, 2011; 7:00 pm, FSN		No. 15 Arizona	L 52–67	9–15 (1–11)	Wells Fargo Arena (10,189); Tempe, AZ
February 17, 2011; 6:30 pm		Washington	L 62–79	9–16 (1–12)	Wells Fargo Arena (7,263); Tempe, AZ
February 19, 2011; 12:30 pm, FSAZ		Washington State	W 71–69	10–16 (2–12)	Wells Fargo Arena (5,153); Tempe, AZ
February 24, 2011; 9:00 pm, FSN		at UCLA	L 53–71	10–17 (2–13)	Pauley Pavilion (8,080); Los Angeles, CA
February 26, 2011; 5:30 pm, FSAZ		at USC	L 46–62	10–18 (2–14)	Galen Center (6,621); Los Angeles, CA
March 3, 2011; 5:30 pm		Oregon	W 73–53	11–18 (3–14)	Wells Fargo Arena (5,544); Tempe, AZ
March 5, 2011; 2:00 pm		Oregon State	W 80–66	12–18 (4–14)	Wells Fargo Arena (5,114); Tempe, AZ
Pac-10 tournament
03/09/2011; 9:30 pm, FSN	(10)	vs. (7) Oregon; Pac-10 First Round	L 69–76	12–19	Staples Center (7,814); Los Angeles, CA
*Non-conference game. ^{#}Rankings from AP Poll. (#) Tournament seedings in parentheses. All times are in Mountain Time.
