= 2010–11 Stanford Cardinal men's basketball team =

American college basketball season

2010–2011 Stanford Cardinal men's basketball
- Conference: Pac-10 Conference
- Record: 15–16 (7–11 Pac-10)
- Head coach: Johnny Dawkins (3rd season)
- Assistant coaches: Dick Davey; Rodney Tention; Mike Schrage
- Home arena: Maples Pavilion

2010–11 Pacific-10 Conference men's basketball standings
	Conf.				Overall
Team	W		L	PCT	W		L	PCT
No. 17 Arizona	14	–	4	.778	30	–	8	.789
UCLA	13	–	5	.722	23	–	11	.676
No. 23 Washington †	11	–	7	.611	24	–	11	.686
USC	10	–	8	.556	19	–	15	.559
California	10	–	8	.556	18	–	15	.545
Washington State	9	–	9	.500	22	–	13	.629
Oregon	7	–	11	.389	21	–	18	.538
Stanford	7	–	11	.389	15	–	16	.484
Oregon State	5	–	13	.278	11	–	20	.355
Arizona State	4	–	14	.222	12	–	19	.387
† Conference tournament winner As of March 30, 2011; Rankings from AP poll

The 2010–11 Stanford Cardinal men's basketball team represented Stanford University during the 2010–11 NCAA Division I men's basketball season. The Cardinal were led by third-year head coach Johnny Dawkins, and played their home games at Maples Pavilion as a member of the Pacific-10 Conference.

== Previous season ==
The Cardinal played in the Cancún Challenge and were able to reach the championship round in the Riviera division and play against #5 ranked Kentucky, but lost in overtime 73–65.

Stanford finished below .500 in conference play for the second year in a row under coach Dawkins. They finished tied for 7th in conference play with Oregon and had the tiebreaker over them, beating them twice during the season. Stanford played Arizona State in the first round and upset the #2 seed Sun Devils 70–61. In the semifinals they played #3 seed Washington but lost 79–64.

Stanford finished under .500 overall for the first time since the 1992–93 season.

== Offseason ==
=== Departures ===
Stanford departures
Name	Number	Pos.	Height	Weight	Year	Hometown	Reason for departure
Drew Shiller	10	G	6'0"	180	RS senior	Burlingame, CA	Graduated
Tavita Pritchard	42	F	6'4"	210	RSs enior	Tacoma, WA	Graduated
Landry Fields	2	G	6'7"	210	Senior	Los Alamitos, CA	Drafted in the 2010 NBA draft by the New York Knicks
Emmanuel Igbinosa	13	G	6'2"	185	Senior	Houston, TX	Graduated
Chris Ebersole	3	G	6'2"	180	Senior	San Francisco, CA	Graduated
Elliott Bullock	40	F	6'10"	235	RS sophomore	Salt Lake City, UT	Left for a Mormon Mission
Matei Daian	15	C	6'10"	240	Sophomore	Bucharest, Romania	Left team
Peter Abraham	20	F	6'6"	200	Freshman	Brea, CA	Left team
Da'veed Dildy	32	G	6'5"	185	RS junior	Chicago, IL	Transferred to Robert Morris University Illinois

=== Incoming ===
College recruiting
Name	Hometown	School	Height	Weight	Commit date
Dwight Powell; F	Toronto, Canada	IMG Academy	6 ft 10 in (2.08 m)	212 lb (96 kg)	Oct 18, 2009
Dwight Powell; F	Recruit ratings: Rivals: 247Sports: ESPN: (95)				
Anthony Brown; G/F	Huntington Beach, CA	Ocean View High School	6 ft 6 in (1.98 m)	180 lb (82 kg)	Oct 6, 2009
Anthony Brown; G/F	Recruit ratings: Rivals: 247Sports: ESPN: (94)				
John Gage; F	Vashon Island, WA	Vashon Island High School	6 ft 10 in (2.08 m)	200 lb (91 kg)	Jul 20, 2009
John Gage; F	Recruit ratings: Rivals: 247Sports: ESPN: (92)				
Josh Huestis; F	Great Falls, MT	Charles M. Russell High School	6 ft 7 in (2.01 m)	200 lb (91 kg)	Oct 30, 2009
Josh Huestis; F	Recruit ratings: Rivals: 247Sports: ESPN: (90)				
Stefan Nastić; C	Thornhill, Canada	Thornhill Secondary School	6 ft 11 in (2.11 m)	225 lb (102 kg)	Feb 10, 2010
Stefan Nastić; C	Recruit ratings: Rivals: 247Sports: ESPN: (90)				
Aaron Bright; G	Bellevue, WA	Bellevue High School	5 ft 11 in (1.80 m)	170 lb (77 kg)	Jul 18, 2009
Aaron Bright; G	Recruit ratings: Rivals: 247Sports: ESPN: (89)				
Overall recruit ranking: Rivals: 17
Note: In many cases, Scout, Rivals, 247Sports, On3, and ESPN may conflict in their listings of height and weight.; In these cases, the average was taken. ESPN grades are on a 100-point scale.; Sources: "Stanford Commit List for 2010". Rivals.; "2010 Team Ranking". Rivals.

== Roster ==
2009–10 Stanford Cardinal men's basketball team
Players
Coaches

Pos.	#	Name	Height	Weight	Year	Previous school	Hometown
G	2	Aaron Bright	5 ft 11 in (1.8 m)	175 lb (79 kg)	Fr	Bellevue High School	Bellevue, WA
G/F	3	Anthony Brown	6 ft 6 in (1.98 m)	200 lb (91 kg)	Fr	Ocean View High School	Huntington Beach, CA
C	4	Stefan Nastić	6 ft 11 in (2.11 m)	225 lb (102 kg)	Fr	Thornhill Secondary School	Thornhill, Ontario
G	10	Robbie Lemons	6 ft 3 in (1.91 m)	193 lb (88 kg)	Fr	Sacramento Country Day School	Carmichael, CA
F	11	Andy Brown	6 ft 8 in (2.03 m)	225 lb (102 kg)	RS Fr	Mater Dei High School	Yorba Linda, CA
F/C	13	Josh Owens	6 ft 8 in (2.03 m)	215 lb (98 kg)	Jr	Phillips Exeter Academy	Kennesaw, GA
G	22	Jarrett Mann	6 ft 3 in (1.91 m)	185 lb (84 kg)	Jr	Blair Academy	Middletown, DE
G	23	Gabriel Harris	6 ft 2 in (1.88 m)	185 lb (84 kg)	So	Altamont School	Birmingham, AL
F	24	Josh Huestis	6 ft 7 in (2.01 m)	223 lb (101 kg)	Fr	Charles M. Russell High School	Great Falls, MT
G	32	Chris Barnum	6 ft 1 in (1.85 m)	175 lb (79 kg)	Fr	Harvard-Westlake School	Los Angeles, CA
F	33	Dwight Powell	6 ft 9 in (2.06 m)	227 lb (103 kg)	Fr	IMG Academy	Toronto, Ontario
F	34	Andrew Zimmerman	6 ft 9 in (2.06 m)	215 lb (98 kg)	RS Jr	Oostburg High School; Foothill College	Oosburg, WI
F/C	40	John Gage	6 ft 9 in (2.06 m)	220 lb (100 kg)	Fr	Vashon Island High School	Vashon Island, WA
G	45	Jeremy Green	6 ft 4 in (1.93 m)	190 lb (86 kg)	Jr	Bowie High School	Austin TX
F/C	50	Jack Trotter	6 ft 9 in (2.06 m)	220 lb (100 kg)	Jr	Campolindo High School	Maraga, CA

Head coach

- Johnny Dawkins (Duke)

Assistant coach(es)

- Dick Davey (Pacific)
- Rodney Tention (San Francisco)
- Mike Schrage (Indiana)

Legend

- (C) Team captain
- (S) Suspended
- (I) Ineligible
- (W) Walk-on
- Injured
- Current redshirt

Roster
Last update: May 21, 2022

== Schedule and results ==
Date time, TV	Rank^{#}	Opponent^{#}	Result	Record	Site (attendance) city, state
Exhibition
November 10, 2010		Cal State Monterey Bay	W 87–56	–	Maples Pavilion; Stanford, CA
Regular season
November 15, 2010*; 7:00 PM		San Diego	W 64–48	1–0	Maples Pavilion (6,110); Stanford, CA
November 18, 2010*; 7:30 PM, FSN		Virginia	W 81–60	2–0	Maples Pavilion (5,314); Stanford, CA
November 21, 2010*; 5:00 PM		Arkansas–Pine Bluff	W 92–49	3–0	Maples Pavilion (4,987); Stanford, CA
November 25, 2010*; 6:00 PM, ESPNU		vs. Murray State; 76 Classic First Round	L 52–55	3–1	Anaheim Convention Center; Anaheim, CA
November 26, 2010*; 8:30 PM, ESPNU		vs. Tulsa; 76 Classic Consolation Second Round	L 53–65	3–2	Anaheim Convention Center (2,467); Anaheim, CA
November 27, 2010*; 10:30 AM		vs. DePaul; 76 Classic 7th Place Game	W 81–74 ^{OT}	4–2	Anaheim Convention Center (1,307); Anaheim, CA
December 12, 2010*; 5:00 PM		UC Riverside	W 55–48	5–2	Maples Pavilion (5,025); Stanford, CA
December 15, 2010*; 7:00 PM		North Carolina A&T	W 76–59	6–2	Maples Pavilion (6,524); Stanford, CA
December 18, 2010*; 2:00 PM, CBS		at Butler	L 50–83	6–3	Hinkle Fieldhouse (8,012); Indianapolis, IN
December 21, 2010*; 8:05 PM, ESPNU		at Oklahoma State; Big 12/Pac-10 Hardwood Series	L 68–79	6–4	Gallagher-Iba Arena (13,011); Stillwater, OK
December 28, 2010*; 7:00 PM, CSNBA		Yale	W 60–44	7–4	Maples Pavilion (5,942); Stanford, CA
January 2, 2011; 5:00 PM, CSNBA		California	W 82–68	8–4 (1–0)	Maples Pavilion (6,281); Stanford, CA
January 6, 2011; 5:30 PM, FSNAZ		at Arizona State	W 55–41	9–4 (2–0)	Wells Fargo Arena (6,660); Tempe, AZ
January 9, 2011; 11:30 AM, CSNBA/FSNAZ		at Arizona	L 57–67	9–5 (2–1)	McKale Center (14,374); Tucson, AZ
January 13, 2011; 7:00 PM		No. 17 Washington	W 58–56	10–5 (3–1)	Maples Pavilion (5,896); Stanford, CA
January 15, 2011; 5:00 PM		Washington State	L 58–61	10–6 (3–2)	Maples Pavilion (5,803); Stanford, CA
January 21, 2011; 7:30 PM		at USC	L 42–65	10–7 (3–3)	Galen Center (4,236); Los Angeles, CA
January 22, 2011; 11:00 AM, CBS		at UCLA	L 57–68	10–8 (3–4)	Pauley Pavilion (8,772); Los Angeles, CA
January 27, 2011; 7:00 PM		Oregon	L 59–67	10–9 (3–5)	Maples Pavilion (5,159); Stanford, CA
January 29, 2011; 7:00 PM, CSNBA		Oregon State	W 70–56	11–9 (4–5)	Maples Pavilion (5,442); Stanford, CA
February 3, 2011; 6:00 PM, FSNAZ		No. 21 Arizona	L 69–78	11–10 (4–6)	Maples Pavilion (5,532); Stanford, CA
February 5, 2011; 3:00 PM, FSN		Arizona State	W 83–75	12–10 (5–6)	Maples Pavilion (5,217); Stanford, CA
February 10, 2011; 7:00 PM		at Washington State	W 75–62	13–10 (6–6)	Beasley Coliseum (6,517); Pullman, WA
February 12, 2011; 5:30 PM, CSNBA/FSNNW		at Washington	L 76–87	13–11 (6–7)	Alaska Airlines Arena (10,000); Seattle, WA
February 17, 2011; 7:30 PM, FSN		UCLA	L 65–69	13–12 (6–8)	Maples Pavilion (5,556); Stanford, CA
February 19, 2011; 7:30 PM, CSNBA/FS West		USC	L 53–69	13–13 (6–9)	Maples Pavilion (5,896); Stanford, CA
February 24, 2011; 6:00 PM, FSNNW		at Oregon State	L 80–87	13–14 (6–10)	Gill Coliseum; Corvallis, OR
February 26, 2011; 3:06 PM, CSNNW		at Oregon	W 88–71	14–14 (7–10)	Matthew Knight Arena (12,364); Eugene, OR
March 1, 2011*; 7:00 PM		Seattle	W 77–66	15–14	Maples Pavilion (5,166); Stanford, CA
March 5, 2011; 4:00 PM, CSNCA		at California	L 55–74	15–15 (7–11)	Haas Pavilion (9,752); Berkeley, CA
Pac-10 tournament
March 9, 2011; 6:00 pm, FSN	(8)	vs. (9) Oregon State; First Round	L 67–69	15–16	Staples Center (7,814); Los Angeles, CA
*Non-conference game. ^{#}Rankings from AP Poll. (#) Tournament seedings in parentheses. All times are in Pacific Standard Time.
