= 2010–11 California Golden Bears men's basketball team =

American college basketball season

2010–11 California Golden Bears men's basketball

NIT, Second Round
- Conference: Pacific-10 Conference
- Record: 18–15 (10–8 Pac-10)
- Head coach: Mike Montgomery
- Assistant coaches: Jay John; Travis DeCuire; Gregg Gottlieb
- Home arena: Haas Pavilion

2010–11 Pacific-10 Conference men's basketball standings
	Conf.				Overall
Team	W		L	PCT	W		L	PCT
No. 17 Arizona	14	–	4	.778	30	–	8	.789
UCLA	13	–	5	.722	23	–	11	.676
No. 23 Washington †	11	–	7	.611	24	–	11	.686
USC	10	–	8	.556	19	–	15	.559
California	10	–	8	.556	18	–	15	.545
Washington State	9	–	9	.500	22	–	13	.629
Oregon	7	–	11	.389	21	–	18	.538
Stanford	7	–	11	.389	15	–	16	.484
Oregon State	5	–	13	.278	11	–	20	.355
Arizona State	4	–	14	.222	12	–	19	.387
† Conference tournament winner As of March 30, 2011; Rankings from AP poll

The 2010–11 California Golden Bears men's basketball team represented the University of California, Berkeley in the 2010–11 NCAA Division I men's basketball season. This was head coach Mike Montgomery's third season at California. The Golden Bears played their home games at Haas Pavilion and participated in the Pacific-10 Conference. The Golden Bears finished the season 18–15, 10–8 in Pac-10 play. They lost to USC in the quarterfinals Pac-10 tournament. They were invited to the 2011 National Invitation Tournament before losing in the second round to Colorado.

== Roster ==
#	Name	Height	Weight (lbs.)	Position	Class	Hometown	Previous team(s)
0	Nigel Carter	6'4"	205	G	Jr.	Los Angeles, CA, U.S.	Dorsey HS
2	Jorge Gutierrez	6'3"	195	G	Jr.	Chihuahua, Mexico	Findlay Prep
10	Markhuri Sanders-Frison	6'7"	265	C	Sr.	Portland, OR, U.S.	Jefferson HS; South Plains
12	Brandon Smith	5'11"	185	G	So.	San Ramon, CA, U.S.	De La Salle HS
13	Justin Cobbs	6'2"	195	G	So.	Los Angeles, CA, U.S.	Bishop Montgomery HS; Minnesota
15	Bak Bak	6'9"	210	F	So.	Sun Valley, CA, U.S.	Village Christian HS
22	Harper Kamp	6'8"	245	F	Jr.	Mesa, AZ, U.S.	Mountain View HS
23	Allen Crabbe	6'6"	205	G	Fr.	Los Angeles, CA, U.S.	Price HS
25	Richard Solomon	6'10"	220	F	Fr.	Los Angeles, CA, U.S.	Price HS
31	Emerson Murray	6'1"	195	G	Fr.	Vancouver, BC, CAN	St. George's School
34	Robert Thurman	6'10"	245	F	Jr.	North Edwards, CA, U.S.	Desert HS; Norwich

=== Coaching staff ===
Name	Position	Year at Cal	Alma mater (year)
Mike Montgomery	Head coach	3rd	Colorado State (1976)
Jay John	Assistant coach	3rd	Arizona (1981)
Travis DeCuire	Assistant coach	3rd	Montana (1994)
Gregg Gottlieb	Assistant coach	4th	UCLA (1995)
John Montgomery	Director of basketball operations	3rd	Loyola Marymount (2007)

== Schedule and results ==
- All times are Pacific

Date time, TV	Rank^{#}	Opponent^{#}	Result	Record	Site (attendance) city, state
Exhibition
11/10/2010*; 7:30pm		Sonoma State	W 106–76	–	Haas Pavilion (NA); Berkeley, CA
Regular season
11/16/2010*; 7:30pm		Cal State Northridge	W 80–63	1–0	Haas Pavilion (6,932); Berkeley, CA
11/20/2010*; 7:00pm		New Mexico	W 89–64	2–0	Haas Pavilion (7,158); Berkeley, CA
11/25/2010*; 6:00pm, ESPN2		vs. No. 21 Temple; Old Spice Classic Quarterfinals	W 57–50	3–0	HP Field House (2,973); Lake Buena Vista, FL
11/26/2010*; 2:00pm, ESPN2		vs. No. 15 Notre Dame; Old Spice Classic Semifinals	L 44–57	3–1	HP Field House (2,932); Lake Buena Vista, FL
11/28/2010*; 10:00am, ESPNU		vs. Boston College; Old Spice Classic 3rd place game	L 46–68	3–2	HP Field House (2,231); Lake Buena Vista, FL
12/01/2010*; 7:00pm		UC Davis	W 74–62	4–2	Haas Pavilion (6,753); Berkeley, CA
12/04/2010*; 11:00am, FSN/CSNBA		at Iowa State; Big 12/Pac-10 Hardwood Series	W 76–73	5–2	Hilton Coliseum (13,284); Ames, IA
12/08/2010*; 7:30pm, CSNCA		No. 14 San Diego State	L 57–77	5–3	Haas Pavilion (9,426); Berkeley, CA
12/12/2010*; 2:00pm		Southern Miss	L 78–80	5–4	Haas Pavilion (8,137); Berkeley, CA
12/18/2010*; 2:00pm		Cal Poly	W 51–41	6–4	Haas Pavilion (7,262); Berkeley, CA
12/24/2010*; 8:00pm, FSN/CSNBA		No. 3 Kansas	L 63–78	6–5	Haas Pavilion (11,250); Berkeley, CA
12/28/2010*; 7:30pm		Hartford	W 74–56	7–5	Haas Pavilion (7,591); Berkeley, CA
01/02/2011; 5:00pm, CSNBA		at Stanford	L 68–82	7–6 (0–1)	Maples Pavilion (6,281); Stanford, CA
01/06/2011; 7:30pm, FSN/CSNBA		at Arizona	L 71–73	7–7 (0–2)	McKale Center (13,863); Tucson, AZ
01/08/2011; 11:30am, FSN/CSNBA		at Arizona State	W 65–61	8–7 (1–2)	Wells Fargo Arena (6,586); Tempe, AZ
01/13/2011; 7:30pm		Washington State	W 88–81 ^{OT}	9–7 (2–2)	Haas Pavilion (6,903); Berkeley, CA
01/16/2011; 7:00pm, FSN/CSNBA		No. 17 Washington	L 71–92	9–8 (2–3)	Haas Pavilion (8,649); Berkeley, CA
01/20/2011; 7:30pm		at UCLA	L 84–86	9–9 (2–4)	Pauley Pavilion (8,650); Los Angeles, CA
01/22/2011; 8:00pm, CSNBA+		at USC	W 68–66	10–9 (3–4)	Galen Center (5,124); Los Angeles, CA
01/27/2011; 8:00pm, FSN/CSNBA		Oregon State	W 85–57	11–9 (4–4)	Haas Pavilion (6,996); Berkeley, CA
01/29/2011; 3:00pm, CSNCA		Oregon	W 85–77	12–9 (5–4)	Haas Pavilion (8,629); Berkeley, CA
02/03/2011; 8:00pm, FSN/CSNBA		Arizona State	W 66–62	13–9 (6–4)	Haas Pavilion (7,129); Berkeley, CA
02/05/2011; 5:00pm, CSNCA		No. 21 Arizona	L 105–107 ^{3OT}	13–10 (6–5)	Haas Pavilion (9,723); Berkeley, CA
02/10/2011; 6:00pm, FSNNW		at Washington	L 77–109	13–11 (6–6)	Alaska Airlines Arena (9,883); Seattle, WA
02/12/2011; 7:00pm		at Washington State	L 71–75	13–12 (6–7)	Beasley Coliseum (7,640); Pullman, WA
02/17/2011; 7:30pm		USC	L 75–78	13–13 (6–8)	Haas Pavilion (7,743); Berkeley, CA
02/20/2011; 7:00pm, FSN/CSNBA		UCLA	W 76–72 ^{OT}	14–13 (7–8)	Haas Pavilion (9,688); Berkeley, CA
02/24/2011; 6:00pm, CSNCA		at Oregon	W 81–71	15–13 (8–8)	Matthew Knight Arena (10,487); Eugene, OR
02/26/2011; 3:00pm, CSNCA		at Oregon State	W 87–76	16–13 (9–8)	Gill Coliseum (6,741); Corvallis, OR
03/05/2011; 4:00pm, CSNCA		Stanford	W 74–55	17–13 (10–8)	Haas Pavilion (9,752); Berkeley, CA
2011 Pacific-10 Conference men's basketball tournament
03/10/2011; 12:00pm, FSN	(5)	vs. (4) USC; Quarterfinals	L 56–70	17–14	Staples Center (10,782); Los Angeles, CA
NIT
03/16/2011*; 6:00pm, ESPN2	(4 C)	(5 C) Ole Miss; First Round	W 77–74	18–14	Haas Pavilion (2,350); Berkeley, CA
03/18/2011*; 7:00 pm, ESPNU	(4 C)	at (1 C) Colorado; Second Round	L 72–89	18–15	Coors Events Center (7,614); Boulder, CO
*Non-conference game. ^{#}Rankings from AP Poll. (#) Tournament seedings in parentheses. C=Colorado Bracket.
