= Washington–Washington State men's basketball rivalry =

American college basketball rivalry

- Washington Huskies Washington State Cougars
- Sport: Men's basketball
- First meeting: February 16, 1910; Washington 13, Washington State 9
- Latest meeting: November 14, 2025; Washington 81, Washington State 69

Statistics
- Total meetings: 300
- All-time series: Washington leads, 189–111
- Largest victory: Washington, 86–41 (1951)
- Longest win streak: Washington, 17 (1923–1930)
- Current win streak: Washington, 3 (2024–present)

Location of campuses in Washington

The Washington–Washington State men's basketball rivalry is a college basketball rivalry between the University of Washington and Washington State University men's basketball teams, the Washington Huskies and Washington State Cougars. The series began in the 1909–10 season and has been played annually since the 1916–17 season. The teams have met 300 times, with Washington leading the series 189–111 as of 2025.

Bud Withers of The Seattle Times has questioned whether the in-state series can be legitimately called a "rivalry", since Washington and Washington State have never made the NCAA Tournament in the same season. However, despite lacking sustained success on the court, both schools count the other as their principal rival. WSU's then-head coach, Kyle Smith, stated: "I don't put [other series] in the same category – no offense to Idaho. UW and Pac-12: that’s the real rivalry. Sorry Moscow, but that can’t be considered our rivalry. There's nothing to gain on that one, let's put it that way."

== Game results ==
Rankings are from the AP Poll. One Washington victory is missing from the table.

Washington victories	Washington State victories	Tie games

No.	Date	Location	Winner	Score
1	1910	Pullman, WA	Washington	13–9
2	1911	Pullman, WA	Washington	29–22
3	1911	Pullman, WA	Washington	23–10
4	1911	Seattle, WA	Washington	23–16
5	1911	Seattle, WA	Washington	23–11
6	1912	Pullman, WA	Washington	38–7
7	1912	Pullman, WA	Washington	27–8
8	1913	Pullman, WA	Washington State	24–22
9	1913	Pullman, WA	Washington State	28–25
10	1913	Seattle, WA	Washington	27–13
11	1913	Seattle, WA	Washington State	31–27
12	1915	Pullman, WA	Washington State	29–28
13	1915	Seattle, WA	Washington	37–13
14	1917	Pullman, WA	Washington State	37–25
15	1917	Pullman, WA	Washington State	41–24
16	1917	Seattle, WA	Washington State	31–24
17	1917	Seattle, WA	Washington State	26–14
18	1918	Seattle, WA	Washington State	28–26
19	1918	Seattle, WA	Washington	25–21
20	1919	Seattle, WA	Washington State	42–33
21	1919	Seattle, WA	Washington State	29–23
22	1919	Pullman, WA	Washington State	28–17
23	1919	Pullman, WA	Washington	25–24
24	1920	Seattle, WA	Washington State	29–23
25	1920	Seattle, WA	Washington	20–14
26	1921	Pullman, WA	Washington	26–24
27	1921	Pullman, WA	Washington State	23–15
28	1921	Seattle, WA	Washington	54–21
29	1921	Seattle, WA	Washington	28–12
30	1922	Seattle, WA	Washington	37–28
31	1922	Seattle, WA	Washington	40–10
32	1922	Pullman, WA	Washington	41–22
33	1922	Pullman, WA	Washington State	30–20
34	1923	Seattle, WA	Washington	29–19
35	1923	Pullman, WA	Washington	31–29
36	1924	Pullman, WA	Washington	26–20
37	1924	Seattle, WA	Washington	33–16
38	1925	Seattle, WA	Washington	33–23
39	1925	Pullman, WA	Washington	32–14
40	1926	Seattle, WA	Washington	34–21
41	1926	Pullman, WA	Washington	24–20
42	1927	Seattle, WA	Washington	39–16
43	1927	Pullman, WA	Washington	29–23
44	1928	Seattle, WA	Washington	26–13
45	1928	Pullman, WA	Washington	49–19
46	1929	Pullman, WA	Washington	38–24
47	1929	Seattle, WA	Washington	33–19
48	1930	Seattle, WA	Washington	32–29^{OT}
49	1930	Seattle, WA	Washington	35–19
50	1930	Pullman, WA	Washington	24–21
51	1930	Pullman, WA	Washington State	29–26
52	1931	Seattle, WA	Washington	45–42
53	1931	Seattle, WA	Washington	24–23
54	1931	Pullman, WA	Washington State	38–26
55	1931	Pullman, WA	Washington	39–26
56	1932	Pullman, WA	Washington State	28–27
57	1932	Pullman, WA	Washington State	49–22
58	1932	Seattle, WA	Washington	32–25
59	1932	Seattle, WA	Washington	44–38
60	1933	Seattle, WA	Washington	34–26
61	1933	Seattle, WA	Washington	32–30
62	1933	Pullman, WA	Washington State	34–26
63	1933	Pullman, WA	Washington	35–28
64	1934	Pullman, WA	Washington	30–28
65	1934	Pullman, WA	Washington	35–30
66	1934	Seattle, WA	Washington	39–24
67	1934	Seattle, WA	Washington	39–23
68	1935	Seattle, WA	Washington	36–28
69	1935	Seattle, WA	Washington State	33–27
70	1935	Pullman, WA	Washington	37–35
71	1935	Pullman, WA	Washington	34–19
72	1936	Seattle, WA	Washington	30–26
73	1936	Seattle, WA	Washington	40–23
74	1936	Pullman, WA	Washington State	36–35^{OT}
75	1936	Pullman, WA	Washington State	48–28
76	1937	Seattle, WA	Washington	45–40
77	1937	Seattle, WA	Washington State	45–35
78	1937	Pullman, WA	Washington	37–34
79	1937	Pullman, WA	Washington	42–35
80	1937	Pullman, WA	Washington State	36–33
81	1938	Pullman, WA	Washington	44–32
82	1938	Pullman, WA	Washington State	51–46
83	1938	Seattle, WA	Washington	58–47
84	1938	Seattle, WA	Washington	50–36
85	1939	Seattle, WA	Washington	41–38
86	1939	Seattle, WA	Washington	41–32
87	1939	Pullman, WA	Washington	62–52
88	1939	Pullman, WA	Washington	49–38
89	1940	Seattle, WA	Washington	39–38
90	1940	Seattle, WA	Washington State	51–35
91	1940	Pullman, WA	Washington State	49–44
92	1940	Pullman, WA	Washington	53–52
93	1941	Seattle, WA	Washington State	44–42
94	1941	Seattle, WA	Washington State	39–31
95	1941	Pullman, WA	Washington State	50–38
96	1941	Pullman, WA	Washington State	69–47
97	1942	Pullman, WA	Washington State	58–52
98	1942	Pullman, WA	Washington State	54–43
99	1942	Seattle, WA	Washington	55–45
100	1942	Seattle, WA	Washington	75–51
101	1943	Seattle, WA	Washington State	41–37
102	1943	Seattle, WA	Washington	72–34
103	1943	Pullman, WA	Washington	61–52
104	1943	Pullman, WA	Washington State	53–49
105	1944	Seattle, WA	Washington	53–40
106	1944	Seattle, WA	Washington	61–41
107	1944	Pullman, WA	Washington	71–50
108	1944	Pullman, WA	Washington	62–43
109	1945	Pullman, WA	Washington State	48–34
110	1945	Pullman, WA	Washington State	65–43
111	1945	Seattle, WA	Washington State	53–42
112	1945	Seattle, WA	Washington State	54–45
113	1946	Seattle, WA	Washington	35–32
114	1946	Seattle, WA	Washington	46–44
115	1946	Pullman, WA	Washington State	48–37
116	1946	Pullman, WA	Washington	56–42
117	1947	Pullman, WA	Washington State	51–48
118	1947	Pullman, WA	Washington State	58–54
119	1947	Seattle, WA	Washington State	54–38
120	1947	Seattle, WA	Washington	59–40
121	1948	Seattle, WA	Washington State	48–47
122	1948	Seattle, WA	Washington	51–36
123	1948	Pullman, WA	Washington	55–50
124	1948	Pullman, WA	Washington State	62–58^{2OT}
125	1949	Pullman, WA	Washington State	44–30
126	1949	Pullman, WA	Washington State	67–50
127	1949	Seattle, WA	Washington	51–46
128	1949	Seattle, WA	Washington	54–51
129	1950	Pullman, WA	Washington State	56–42
130	1950	Pullman, WA	#20 Washington	52–37
131	1950	Seattle, WA	#16 Washington State	54–46
132	1950	Seattle, WA	#16 Washington State	60–42
133	1951	Pullman, WA	Washington State	50–38
134	1951	Pullman, WA	Washington State	63–60
135	1951	Seattle, WA	#19 Washington	53–44
136	1951	Seattle, WA	#19 Washington	86–41
137	1952	Pullman, WA	Washington State	56–50
138	1952	Pullman, WA	#6 Washington	67–43
139	1952	Seattle, WA	#6 Washington	75–37
140	1952	Seattle, WA	#6 Washington	82–51
141	1953	Pullman, WA	#3 Washington	75–41
142	1953	Pullman, WA	#3 Washington	60–48
143	1953	Seattle, WA	#3 Washington	79–51
144	1953	Seattle, WA	#3 Washington	69–56
145	1954	Pullman, WA	Washington State	56–48
146	1954	Pullman, WA	Washington	54–44
147	1954	Seattle, WA	Washington	56–48
148	1954	Seattle, WA	Washington	65–56
149	1955	Pullman, WA	Washington	69–38
150	1955	Pullman, WA	Washington State	74–73
151	1955	Seattle, WA	Washington	76–40
152	1955	Seattle, WA	Washington	63–49

No.	Date	Location	Winner	Score
153	1956	Seattle, WA	Washington	62–42
154	1956	Seattle, WA	Washington	80–57
155	1957	Pullman, WA	Washington	73–72
156	1957	Pullman, WA	Washington	76–66
157	1958	Pullman, WA	Washington	68–62
158	1958	Seattle, WA	Washington State	58–41
159	1959	Seattle, WA	Washington	82–73
160	1959	Pullman, WA	Washington	82–80
161	1959	Seattle, WA	Washington	77–62
162	1960	Pullman, WA	Washington State	79–71
163	1960	Spokane, WA	Washington	64–47
164	1961	Pullman, WA	Washington	66–63
165	1961	Seattle, WA	Washington	79–66
166	1962	Seattle, WA	Washington	66–51
167	1962	Pullman, WA	Washington	72–58
168	1963	Pullman, WA	Washington	61–56
169	1963	Seattle, WA	Washington	59–57
170	1964	Pullman, WA	Washington State	61–59
171	1964	Pullman, WA	Washington	63–61
172	1964	Seattle, WA	Washington	57–52
173	1964	Seattle, WA	Washington	70–66
174	1965	Pullman, WA	Washington State	56–53
175	1965	Seattle, WA	Washington State	78–74^{2OT}
176	1965	Pullman, WA	Washington	76–55
177	1966	Seattle, WA	Washington	70–67
178	1966	Pullman, WA	Washington State	81–74
179	1966	Portland, OR	Washington	80–72
180	1967	Pullman, WA	Washington State	78–69
181	1967	Seattle, WA	Washington	86–75
182	1968	Seattle, WA	Washington State	75–70
183	1968	Pullman, WA	Washington State	87–63
184	1969	Pullman, WA	Washington State	62–55
185	1969	Seattle, WA	Washington State	69–61
186	1970	Seattle, WA	Washington	37–36
187	1970	Pullman, WA	Washington State	79–68
188	1971	Pullman, WA	Washington State	90–79
189	1971	Seattle, WA	Washington	73–63
190	1972	Seattle, WA	Washington	103–92
191	1972	Pullman, WA	Washington	96–63
192	1973	Seattle, WA	Washington	58–51
193	1973	Pullman, WA	Washington	88–76
194	1974	Seattle, WA	Washington	90–77
195	1974	Pullman, WA	Washington	82–71
196	1975	Pullman, WA	Washington	103–70
197	1975	Seattle, WA	Washington State	81–73
198	1976	Seattle, WA	#6 Washington	75–65
199	1976	Pullman, WA	Washington State	61–59
200	1977	Pullman, WA	Washington	71–68
201	1977	Seattle, WA	Washington	66–52
202	1978	Seattle, WA	Washington	68–52
203	1978	Pullman, WA	Washington State	57–52
204	1978	Seattle, WA	Washington State	60–47
205	1979	Pullman, WA	Washington	57–56
206	1979	Seattle, WA	Washington State	65–56
207	1980	Seattle, WA	Washington State	72–68
208	1980	Pullman, WA	Washington	64–63
209	1981	Pullman, WA	Washington	81–70
210	1981	Seattle, WA	Washington	70–64
211	1982	Seattle, WA	Washington	75–60
212	1982	Pullman, WA	Washington State	62–42
213	1983	Pullman, WA	Washington State	72–70
214	1983	Seattle, WA	Washington	76–75
215	1984	Seattle, WA	Washington	58–48
216	1984	Pullman, WA	#13 Washington	67–51
217	1985	Pullman, WA	Washington	73–56
218	1985	Seattle, WA	Washington	68–55
219	1986	Seattle, WA	Washington	72–63
220	1986	Pullman, WA	Washington	79–70
221	1987	Pullman, WA	Washington	79–65
222	1987	Seattle, WA	Washington State	86–80
223	1988	Seattle, WA	Washington State	70–63
224	1988	Pullman, WA	Washington State	61–52
225	1989	Pullman, WA	Washington	69–63
226	1989	Seattle, WA	Washington	76–70
227	1990	Seattle, WA	Washington	80–79
228	1990	Pullman, WA	Washington	59–56
229	1991	Pullman, WA	Washington	50–48
230	1991	Seattle, WA	Washington State	80–76
231	1992	Seattle, WA	Washington	78–73
232	1992	Pullman, WA	Washington State	75–57
233	1993	Pullman, WA	Washington	59–56
234	1993	Seattle, WA	Washington State	72–59
235	1994	Seattle, WA	Washington State	67–46
236	1994	Pullman, WA	Washington State	75–51
237	1995	Pullman, WA	Washington State	74–73
238	1995	Seattle, WA	Washington	78–72
239	1996	Seattle, WA	Washington	85–71
240	1996	Pullman, WA	Washington State	76–66
241	1997	Pullman, WA	Washington	74–72
242	1997	Seattle, WA	Washington	91–70
243	1998	Seattle, WA	Washington	82–76
244	1998	Pullman, WA	Washington	70–51
245	1999	Pullman, WA	Washington State	72–71
246	1999	Seattle, WA	Washington	76–59
247	2000	Pullman, WA	Washington	74–68^{OT}
248	2000	Seattle, WA	Washington	64–60
249	2001	Seattle, WA	Washington	78–72
250	2001	Pullman, WA	Washington State	79–61
251	2002	Pullman, WA	Washington State	81–79
252	2002	Seattle, WA	Washington	82–75
253	2003	Seattle, WA	Washington	81–67
254	2003	Pullman, WA	Washington State	98–76
255	2004	Pullman, WA	Washington	75–62
256	2004	Seattle, WA	Washington	71–67
257	2005	Seattle, WA	#10 Washington	66–48
258	2005	Pullman, WA	#15 Washington	68–55
259	2006	Seattle, WA	Washington State	78–71
260	2006	Pullman, WA	Washington State	77–64
261	2007	Pullman, WA	Washington State	75–47
262	2007	Seattle, WA	#10 Washington State	65–61
263	2007	Los Angeles, CA	#11 Washington State	74–64
264	2008	Seattle, WA	#4 Washington State	56–52
265	2008	Pullman, WA	#23 Washington State	76–73^{2OT}
266	2009	Pullman, WA	Washington	68–48
267	2009	Seattle, WA	#16 Washington	67–60
268	2010	Seattle, WA	Washington	92–64
269	2010	Pullman, WA	Washington	59–52
270	2011	Pullman, WA	Washington State	87–80
271	2011	Seattle, WA	Washington State	80–69
272	2011	Los Angeles, CA	Washington	89–87
273	2012	Seattle, WA	Washington	75–65
274	2012	Pullman, WA	Washington	59–55
275	2013	Pullman, WA	Washington	68–63
276	2013	Seattle, WA	Washington	72–68
277	2014	Pullman, WA	Washington State	72–67
278	2014	Seattle, WA	Washington	72–49
279	2015	Seattle, WA	Washington State	80–77
280	2015	Pullman, WA	Washington	87–84
281	2016	Pullman, WA	Washington	99–95^{OT}
282	2016	Seattle, WA	Washington	99–91
283	2017	Seattle, WA	Washington State	79–74
284	2017	Pullman, WA	Washington State	79–71
285	2018	Pullman, WA	Washington	70–65
286	2018	Seattle, WA	Washington	80–62
287	2019	Seattle, WA	Washington	85–67
288	2019	Pullman, WA	Washington	72–70
289	2020	Pullman, WA	Washington State	79–67
290	2020	Seattle, WA	Washington State	78–74
291	2021	Seattle, WA	Washington State	77–62
292	2021	Pullman, WA	Washington	65–63
293	2022	Pullman, WA	Washington State	78–70
294	2022	Seattle, WA	Washington	78–70
295	2023	Pullman, WA	Washington State	56–51
296	2023	Seattle, WA	Washington State	93–84
297	2024	Seattle, WA	Washington State	90–87^{OT}
298	2024	Pullman, WA	Washington	74–68
299	2024	Seattle, WA	Washington	89–73
300	2025	Pullman, WA	Washington	81–69
301	2026 (Exhibition)	Seattle, WA	Washington State	84–80
Series: Washington leads 189–112
