= 2010–11 Arizona Wildcats men's basketball team =

American college basketball season

2010–11 Arizona Wildcats men's basketball

Pac-10 Regular Season Champions

NCAA Tournament, Elite Eight
- Conference: Pacific-10 Conference

Ranking
- Coaches: No. 9
- AP: No. 17
- Record: 30–8 (14–4 Pac-10)
- Head coach: Sean Miller (2nd season)
- Assistant coaches: Archie Miller; James Whitford; Emanuel Richardson
- Home arena: McKale Center

2010–11 Pacific-10 Conference men's basketball standings
	Conf.				Overall
Team	W		L	PCT	W		L	PCT
No. 17 Arizona	14	–	4	.778	30	–	8	.789
UCLA	13	–	5	.722	23	–	11	.676
No. 23 Washington †	11	–	7	.611	24	–	11	.686
USC	10	–	8	.556	19	–	15	.559
California	10	–	8	.556	18	–	15	.545
Washington State	9	–	9	.500	22	–	13	.629
Oregon	7	–	11	.389	21	–	18	.538
Stanford	7	–	11	.389	15	–	16	.484
Oregon State	5	–	13	.278	11	–	20	.355
Arizona State	4	–	14	.222	12	–	19	.387
† Conference tournament winner As of March 30, 2011; Rankings from AP poll

The 2010–11 Arizona Wildcats men's basketball team represented the University of Arizona during the 2010–11 NCAA Division I men's basketball season. The Wildcats, led by second-year head coach Sean Miller, played their home games at the McKale Center and were members of the Pacific-10 Conference. Miller was named the Pac-10 Conference 2011 John R. Wooden Coach of the Year. The Wildcats finished the regular season 25–6, 14–4 in Pac-10 play to win the twelfth Pac-10 regular season championship title for the first time since 2005. They lost in the championship game of the 2011 Pacific-10 Conference men's basketball tournament to Washington. They received an at-large bid to the 2011 NCAA Division I men's basketball tournament, as the No. 5 seed in the West Regional, where they defeated Memphis in the second round, Texas in the third round, and Duke in the round of sixteen. In the Elite Eight, they lost to the eventual national champion Connecticut.

== Recruits ==
College recruiting
Name	Hometown	School	Height	Weight	Commit date
Daniel Bejarano; SG	Phoenix, Arizona	North High School	6 ft 5 in (1.96 m)	200 lb (91 kg)	Oct 9, 2009
Daniel Bejarano; SG	Recruit ratings: Scout: Rivals: (93)				
Jesse Perry; SF	St. Louis, Missouri	John A. Logan Community College (IL)	6 ft 8 in (2.03 m)	210 lb (95 kg)	Mar 28, 2010
Jesse Perry; SF	Recruit ratings: Scout: Rivals: (93)				
Jordin Mayes; SG	Los Angeles, California	Westchester	6 ft 1 in (1.85 m)	175 lb (79 kg)	Feb 1, 2010
Jordin Mayes; SG	Recruit ratings: Scout: Rivals: (92)				
Overall recruit ranking: Scout: NR Rivals: NR ESPN: NR
Note: In many cases, Scout, Rivals, 247Sports, On3, and ESPN may conflict in their listings of height and weight.; In these cases, the average was taken. ESPN grades are on a 100-point scale.; Sources: "ESPN". ESPN.; "2010 Team Ranking". Rivals.

== Roster ==
2010–11 Arizona Wildcats men's basketball team
Players
Coaches

Pos.	#	Name	Height	Weight	Year	Hometown
G	0	Dondre Wise (W)	6 ft 1 in (1.85 m)	214 lb (97 kg)	Jr	Houston, Texas
C	1	Kyryl Natyazhko	6 ft 11 in (2.11 m)	264 lb (120 kg)	So	Dnipropetrovsk, Ukraine
G	2	Daniel Bejarano	6 ft 4 in (1.93 m)	208 lb (94 kg)	Fr	Phoenix, Arizona
G/F	3	Kevin Parrom	6 ft 6 in (1.98 m)	205 lb (93 kg)	So	Bronx, New York
G	5	Robert Arvizu (W)	6 ft 0 in (1.83 m)	182 lb (83 kg)	Fr	Phoenix, Arizona
G	12	Lamont Jones	6 ft 0 in (1.83 m)	196 lb (89 kg)	So	Harlem, New York
G	20	Jordin Mayes	6 ft 2 in (1.88 m)	185 lb (84 kg)	Fr	Los Angeles, California
G	21	Kyle Fogg	6 ft 3 in (1.91 m)	180 lb (82 kg)	Jr	Brea, California
F	23	Derrick Williams	6 ft 8 in (2.03 m)	241 lb (109 kg)	So	La Mirada, California
G	24	Brendon Lavender	6 ft 5 in (1.96 m)	215 lb (98 kg)	Jr	Mesa, Arizona
F	33	Jesse Perry	6 ft 7 in (2.01 m)	210 lb (95 kg)	Jr	St. Louis, Missouri
F	42	Jamelle Horne	6 ft 7 in (2.01 m)	224 lb (102 kg)	Sr	San Diego, California
G	44	Solomon Hill	6 ft 7 in (2.01 m)	226 lb (103 kg)	So	Los Angeles, California
C	50	Alex Jacobson	7 ft 0 in (2.13 m)	251 lb (114 kg)	Jr	Brea, California
F	52	Max Wiepking (W)	6 ft 6 in (1.98 m)	200 lb (91 kg)	So	Englewood, Colorado

Head coach

- Sean Miller (Pittsburgh)

Assistant coach(es)

- Archie Miller (NC State)
- James Whitford (Wisconsin)
- Emanuel Richardson (Pitt–Johnstown)

Legend

- (C) Team captain
- (S) Suspended
- (I) Ineligible
- (W) Walk-on
- Injured
- Current redshirt

Roster
Last update: 2011-3-21

=== Depth chart ===
Pos.	Starting 5	Bench 1	Bench 2	Bench 3
C	Derrick Williams	Kyryl Natyazhko	Alex Jacobson
PF	Jesse Perry	Jamelle Horne
SF	Solomon Hill	Kevin Parrom	Max Wiepking
SG	Kyle Fogg	Brendon Lavender	Daniel Bejarano
PG	Lamont Jones	Jordin Mayes	Dondre Wise	Robert Arvizu

== Schedule ==
Date time, TV	Rank^{#}	Opponent^{#}	Result	Record	Site (attendance) city, state
Exhibition
November 7, 2010*; 4:00 pm		Augustana (SD)	W 70–59	—	McKale Center (11,985); Tucson, AZ
Non-conference regular season
November 14, 2010*; 3:00 pm, KWBA/FSAZ		Idaho State	W 90–42	1–0	McKale Center (12,142); Tucson, AZ
November 18, 2010*; 6:30 pm, FSAZ		New Mexico State	W 83–57	2–0	McKale Center (13,590); Tucson, AZ
November 21, 2010*; 3:00 pm, KWBA/FSAZ		Northern Colorado; Las Vegas Invitational	W 93–70	3–0	McKale Center (12,057); Tucson, AZ
November 23, 2010*; 6:30 pm, FCS		Bethune–Cookman; Las Vegas Invitational	W 78–45	4–0	McKale Center (11,762); Tucson, AZ
November 26, 2010*; 7:30 pm, KWBA		vs. Santa Clara; Las Vegas Invitational semifinal	W 82–59	5–0	Orleans Arena (4,010); Paradise, NV
November 27, 2010*; 7:30 pm, ESPN2		vs. No. 6 Kansas; Las Vegas Invitational championship	L 79–87	5–1	Orleans Arena (5,120); Paradise, NV
December 1, 2010*; 6:00 pm, CBSCS		at Rice	W 84–57	6–1	Tudor Fieldhouse (2,680); Houston, TX
December 5, 2010*; 2:00 pm, FSN		Oklahoma; Big 12/Pac-10 Hardwood Series	W 83–60	7–1	McKale Center (13,025); Tucson, AZ
December 8, 2010*; 6:30 pm, KWBA/FCS		Cal State Fullerton	W 73–62	8–1	McKale Center (12,199); Tucson, AZ
December 11, 2010*; 4:00 pm, BYUTV		vs. No. 18 BYU	L 65–87	8–2	EnergySolutions Arena (15,814); Salt Lake City, UT
December 16, 2010*; 8:30 pm, FSAZ		Northern Arizona; Fiesta Bowl Basketball Classic	W 63–58	9–2	McKale Center (13,557); Tucson, AZ
December 19, 2010*; 2:30 pm, FSN		at NC State	W 72–62	10–2	RBC Center (16,119); Raleigh, NC
December 22, 2010*; 6:30 pm, KWBA/FSAZ		Robert Morris	W 82–56	11–2	McKale Center (13,982); Tucson, AZ
Pac-10 regular season
December 30, 2010; 8:00 pm, KWBA		at Oregon	W 76–57	12–2 (1–0)	McArthur Court (6,498); Eugene, OR
January 2, 2011; 8:00 pm, FSN		at Oregon State	L 75–76	12–3 (1–1)	Gill Coliseum (5,218); Corvallis, OR
January 6, 2011; 8:30 pm, FSN		California	W 73–71	13–3 (2–1)	McKale Center (13,863); Tucson, AZ
January 9, 2011; 12:30 pm, FSAZ		Stanford	W 67–57	14–3 (3–1)	McKale Center (14,374); Tucson, AZ
January 15, 2011; 12:30 pm, FSN		Arizona State	W 80–69	15–3 (4–1)	McKale Center (14,601); Tucson, AZ
January 20, 2011; 8:30 pm, FSN		at No. 20 Washington	L 68–85	15–4 (4–2)	Alaska Airlines Arena (10,000); Seattle, WA
January 22, 2011; 8:30 pm, FSAZ		at Washington State	W 65–63	16–4 (5–2)	Beasley Coliseum (8,850); Pullman, WA
January 27, 2011; 7:00 pm, ESPN2		UCLA	W 85–74	17–4 (6–2)	McKale Center (14,528); Tucson, AZ
January 29, 2011; 5:30 pm, KWBA/FSAZ		USC	W 82–73	18–4 (7–2)	McKale Center (14,613); Tucson, AZ
February 3, 2011; 7:00 pm, KWBA/FSAZ	No. 21	at Stanford	W 78–69	19–4 (8–2)	Maples Pavilion (5,532); Stanford, CA
February 5, 2011; 6:00 pm, KWBA/FSAZ	No. 21	at California	W 107–105 ^{3OT}	20–4 (9–2)	Haas Pavilion (9,723); Berkeley, CA
February 13, 2011; 7:00 pm, FSN	No. 15	at Arizona State	W 67–52	21–4 (10–2)	Wells Fargo Arena (10,189); Tempe, AZ
February 17, 2011; 6:30 pm, FSN	No. 12	Washington State	W 79–70	22–4 (11–2)	McKale Center (14,456); Tucson, AZ
February 19, 2011; 4:00 pm, ESPN	No. 12	Washington	W 87–86	23–4 (12–2)	McKale Center (14,619); Tucson, AZ
February 24, 2011; 8:30 pm, KWBA/FSAZ+	No. 10	at USC	L 57–65	23–5 (12–3)	Galen Center (6,857); Los Angeles, CA
February 26, 2011; 2:00 pm, FSN	No. 10	at UCLA	L 49–71	23–6 (12–4)	Pauley Pavilion (11,986); Los Angeles, CA
March 3, 2011; 7:00 pm, FSN	No. 18	Oregon State	W 70–59	24–6 (13–4)	McKale Center (14,588); Tucson, AZ
March 5, 2011; 12:00 pm, CBS	No. 18	Oregon	W 90–82	25–6 (14–4)	McKale Center (14,605); Tucson, AZ
Pac-10 tournament
March 10, 2011; 3:30 pm, FSN	(1) No. 16	vs. (9) Oregon State; Pac-10 Quarterfinals	W 78–69	26–6	Staples Center (10,782); Los Angeles, CA
March 11, 2011; 7:00 pm, FSN	(1) No. 16	vs. (4) USC; Pac-10 Semifinals	W 67–62	27–6	Staples Center (13,190); Los Angeles, CA
March 12, 2011; 3:00 pm, CBS	(1) No. 16	vs. (3) Washington; Championship	L 75–77 ^{OT}	27–7	Staples Center (12,074); Los Angeles, CA
NCAA tournament
March 18, 2011*; 12:45 pm, CBS	(5 W) No. 17	vs. (12 W) Memphis; NCAA First Round	W 77–75	28–7	BOK Center (12,631); Tulsa, OK
March 20, 2011*; 6:10 pm, TNT	(5 W) No. 17	vs. (4 W) No. 8 Texas; NCAA Second Round	W 70–69	29–7	BOK Center (15,839); Tulsa, OK
March 24, 2011*; 7:45 pm, CBS	(5 W) No. 17	vs. (1 W) No. 3 Duke; NCAA Sweet Sixteen	W 93–77	30–7	Honda Center (17,890); Anaheim, CA
March 26, 2011*; 5:05 pm, CBS	(5 W) No. 17	vs. (3 W) No. 9 Connecticut; NCAA Elite Eight	L 63–65	30–8	Honda Center (17,856); Anaheim, CA
*Non-conference game. ^{#}Rankings from AP Poll. (#) Tournament seedings in parentheses. W=West Region. All times are in Mountain Time.

== Awards ==
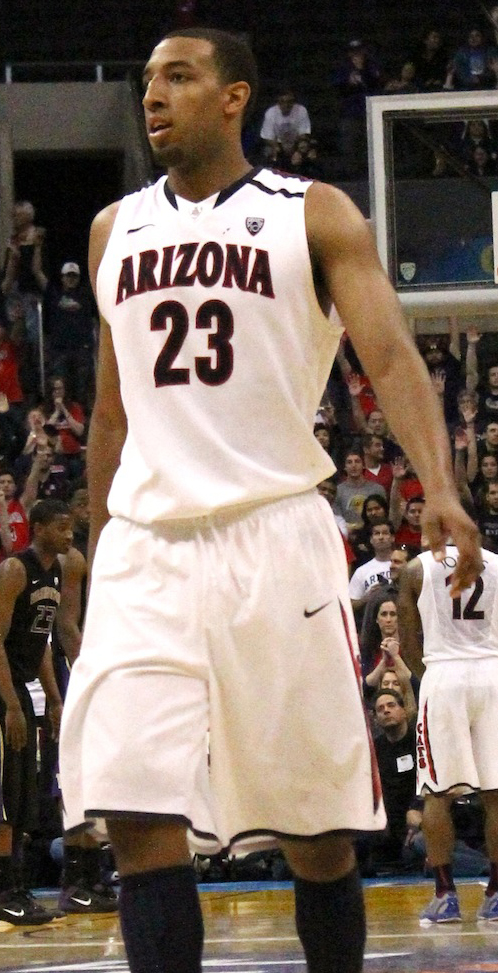
Derrick Williams

Lamont Jones

- Pac-10 Player of the Week (January 31, 2011)

Derrick Williams

- Pac-10 Player of the Year
- Pac-10 First Team All-Conference
- Pac-10 Player of the Week (December 6, 2010; January 17, 2011; February 21, 2011)
- Consensus NCAA All-American Second Team (Associated Press, Sporting News, USBWA, NABC)
- USBWA District IX Player of the Year
- Wooden Award All-American
- Sports Illustrated First-team All-American
- Fox Sports Second-team All-American

Sean Miller

- Pac-10 John R. Wooden Coach of the Year
