= Joevan Catron =

American professional basketball player (born 1988)

Personal information
- Born: February 25, 1988 (age 38) Chicago, Illinois, U.S.
- Listed height: 6 ft 6 in (1.98 m)
- Listed weight: 245 lb (111 kg)

Career information
- High school: Thornton Township (Harvey, Illinois)
- College: Oregon (2006–2011)
- NBA draft: 2011: undrafted
- Playing career: 2011–2013
- Position: Power forward

Career history
- 2011–2012: Wollongong Hawks
- 2012: Levanga Hokkaido
- 2013: Portland Chinooks

Career highlights
- Second-team All-Pac-10 (2011)

Joevan Eugene Catron (born February 25, 1988) is an American former professional basketball player.

== Early life ==
Catron is a graduate of Thornton Township High School, where he attended all four years, while also playing basketball. He also played varsity football his sophomore year. He earned first-team All-State honors his senior year. After high school, Catron was invited to the USA Team U-18 tryouts before heading to the University of Oregon.

== College career ==
Catron started his college career at the University of Oregon in 2006. He helped contribute to the team by hard work and effort, helping the team to an NCAA Elite 8 appearance, before losing to the soon to be champion Florida Gators. Catron became a starter during the 2007–08 season, averaging 25.7 minutes, 8.8 points, and 5.7 rebounds per game. He was a key player for the Ducks in the 2008–09 season, leading the team in rebounds, steals, and assists.

Catron missed the 2009–10 season due to injury, but petitioned for a medical redshirt. It was awarded to him and he was able to come back for a fifth year to play under his new head coach Dana Altman (previously coached by Ernie Kent). During the 2010–11 season, Catron earned second-team all-conference honors, the first Duck to do so in four years. He led Oregon in scoring (16.0 points per game), rebounding (6.3 rebounds per game), and field goal percentage (49.5 percent). In final game against Creighton University, in the CBI Championship NCAA College Basketball series, Catron won the Most Valuable Player award, while scoring a career-high 29 points. During Catron's time at the University of Oregon, he also earned his degree in sociology.

== Professional career ==
In August 2011, Catron signed with the Wollongong Hawks for the 2011–12 NBL season. In 27 games for the Hawks, he averaged 10.3 points, 4.4 rebounds and 1.1 assists per game.

In July 2012, Catron signed with Levanga Hokkaido of Japan for the 2012–13 JBL season. His stint lasted until mid-December as he parted ways with the team after appearing in 20 games. In those 20 games, he averaged 11.2 points, 5.5 rebounds and 1.1 steals per game. In May 2013, Catron had a one-game stint with the Portland Chinooks of the International Basketball League.

On November 1, 2013, Catron was selected by the Springfield Armor in the fourth round of the 2013 NBA Development League Draft. However, he was later waived by the Armor on November 21 prior to the start of the regular season.
