= 2011 Pacific-10 Conference men's basketball tournament =

- Classification: Division I
- Season: 2010–11
- Teams: 10
- Site: Staples Center; Los Angeles, California
- Champions: Washington Huskies (3rd title)
- Winning coach: Lorenzo Romar (3rd title)
- MVP: Isaiah Thomas (Washington)
- Attendance: 12,074
- Top scorer: Klay Thompson (Washington State) (43 points)
- Television: CBS, FSN

2010–11 Pacific-10 Conference men's basketball standings
	Conf.				Overall
Team	W		L	PCT	W		L	PCT
No. 17 Arizona	14	–	4	.778	30	–	8	.789
UCLA	13	–	5	.722	23	–	11	.676
No. 23 Washington †	11	–	7	.611	24	–	11	.686
USC	10	–	8	.556	19	–	15	.559
California	10	–	8	.556	18	–	15	.545
Washington State	9	–	9	.500	22	–	13	.629
Oregon	7	–	11	.389	21	–	18	.538
Stanford	7	–	11	.389	15	–	16	.484
Oregon State	5	–	13	.278	11	–	20	.355
Arizona State	4	–	14	.222	12	–	19	.387
† Conference tournament winner As of March 30, 2011; Rankings from AP poll

The 2011 Pacific Life Pacific-10 Conference men's basketball tournament was played on March 9–11, 2011 at Staples Center in Los Angeles, California. The tournament champion became the NCAA tournament automatic qualifier from the conference. The Arizona Wildcats, finish the season atop of the conference with a 14–4 record, and the UCLA Bruins were the two top-seed teams in the tournament. The third-seeded Washington Huskies won the tournament. This was the final tournament ever held under the "Pac-10" name, as Colorado and Utah joined the conference in July, making it the "Pac-12."

== Seeds ==
Teams were seeded by conference record, with a tiebreaker system used to seed teams with identical conference records.

Seed	School	Conf	Overall	Tiebreaker
#1	Arizona	14–4	25–6	
#2	UCLA	13–5	22–9	
#3	Washington	11–7	20–10	
#4	USC	10–8	18–13	1–1 vs. Cal, 1–1 vs. UA
#5	California	10–8	17–13	1–1 vs. USC, 0–2 vs. UA
#6	Washington State	9–9	19–11	
#7	Oregon	7–11	14–16	
#8	Stanford	7–11	15–15	
#9	Oregon State	5–13	10–19	
#10	Arizona State	4–14	12–18	

== Schedule ==
Session	Game	Time*	Matchup^{#}	Television	Attendance	
First Round – Wednesday, March 9
1	1	6:00 PM	#8 Stanford vs #9 Oregon State	67–69	FSN	7,814
1	2	8:30 PM	#7 Oregon vs #10 Arizona State	76–69	FSN	7,814
Quarterfinals – Thursday, March 10
2	3	12:00 PM	#4 USC vs #5 Cal	70–56	FSN	10,782
2	4	2:30 PM	#1 Arizona vs #9 Oregon State	78–69	FSN	10,782
3	5	6:00 PM	#2 UCLA vs #7 Oregon	59–76	FSN	12,191
3	6	8:30 PM	#3 Washington vs #6 Washington State	89–87	FSN	12,191
Semifinals – Friday, March 11
4	7	6:00 PM	#4 USC vs. #1 Arizona	62–67	FSN	13,190
4	8	8:30 PM	#7 Oregon vs. #3 Washington	51–69	FSN	13,190
Championship Game – Saturday, March 12
5	9	3:00 PM	#1 Arizona vs. #3 Washington	75–77	CBS	12,074
*Game Times in PT. #-Rankings denote tournament seeding.

== Bracket ==
First Round; March 9
8	Stanford	67
9	Oregon State	69
7	Washington State	76
10	Arizona State	69

Quarterfinals; March 10
1	Arizona (#16)	78
9	Oregon State	69
4	Southern California	70
5	California	56
3	Washington	89
6	Washington State	87
2	UCLA	59
7	Oregon	76

Semifinals; March 11
1	Arizona (#16)	67
4	Southern California	62
3	Washington	69
7	Oregon	51

Final; March 12
1	Arizona (#16)	75
3	Washington	77

== Tournament notes ==
- Both men’s and women’s basketball tournament semi-final and final games were held at the Staples Center.
- The annual Coach of the Year Award was renamed to honor Coach John Wooden. Sean Miller of the Arizona Wildcats was the 2011 winner.
- Chick Hearn Court between Staples Center and LA Live was the location for the new Pac-10 FanFest, featuring a basketball sport court, beer garden, family-friendly activities like face painting and sign making, a live DJ, band and cheer performances, and Wolfgang Puck food specials. The Women's trophy presentation and institutional headquarters were also located at the FanFest.
- The championship game was the first title game in conference history to require an overtime period.
- Washington and Washington St. were the only arch rivals to meet up in this year. It was the first arch rival tournament game of any pair in two years.
- Klay Thompson of Washington State had a record setting 29 FG attempts vs. Washington. His record still stands. He was 15 of 29 .
- Jeremy Green's 15 3-pt. FG attempts vs. Oregon State set a tournament record. Playing for Stanford, he was 7 of 15.
- With the automatic bid to the NCAA tournament, Washington made its 16th appearance. Three other teams were invited to the 2011 NCAA Men's Division I Basketball Championship: UCLA, USC, and Arizona.

== All-Tournament Team ==
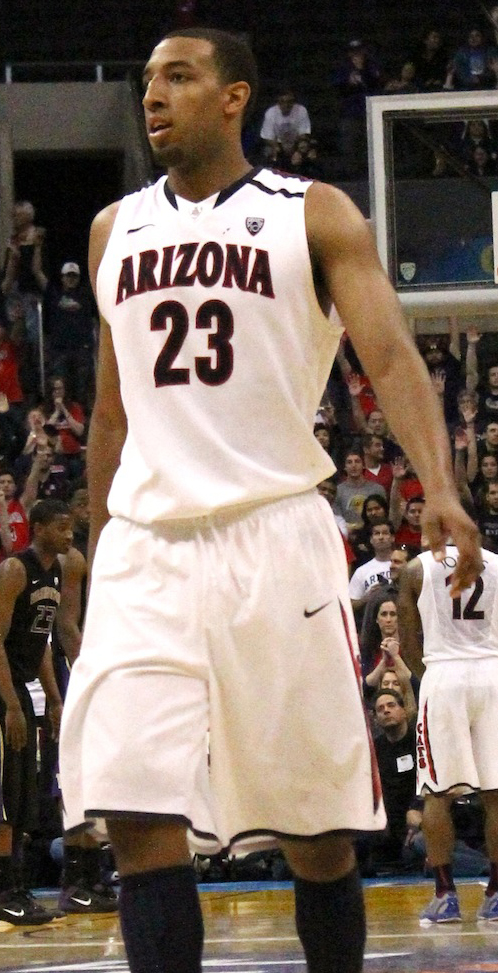
Derrick Williams

- Jared Cunningham, Oregon State
- E. J. Singler, Oregon
- Klay Thompson, Washington State
- Derrick Williams, Arizona
- Terrence Ross, Washington
- Isaiah Thomas, Washington

== Most Outstanding Player ==
- Isaiah Thomas, Washington

== 2011 Hall of Honor inductees ==
The induction ceremony took place on Saturday, March 12, 2011, during the Pac-10 Hall of Honor breakfast:

- Michael Dickerson (Arizona)
- Isaac Austin (Arizona State)
- Bob McKeen (California)
- Charlie Warren (Oregon)
- Charlie White (Oregon State)
- Brevin Knight (Stanford)
- Don MacLean (UCLA)
- Harold Miner (USC)
- Todd MacCulloch (Washington)
- Ray Sundquist (Washington State)

== See also ==
- 2010–11 Pacific-10 Conference men's basketball standings
