= 2010–11 Memphis Tigers men's basketball team =

American college basketball season

2010–11 Memphis Tigers men's basketball

Conference USA tournament champions

NCAA Tournament, Round of 64
- Conference: Conference USA
- Record: 25–10 (10–6 C-USA)
- Head coach: Josh Pastner (2nd year)
- Assistant coaches: Glynn Cyprien; Jack Murphy; Willis Wilson
- Home arena: FedExForum

2010–11 Conference USA men's basketball standings
	Conf.				Overall
Team	W		L	PCT	W		L	PCT
UAB	12	–	4	.750	22	–	9	.710
Tulsa	11	–	5	.688	19	–	13	.594
UTEP	11	–	5	.688	25	–	10	.714
Memphis †	10	–	6	.625	25	–	10	.714
Southern Miss	9	–	7	.563	22	–	10	.688
Marshall	9	–	7	.563	22	–	12	.647
SMU	8	–	8	.500	20	–	15	.571
East Carolina	8	–	8	.500	18	–	16	.529
Rice	5	–	11	.313	14	–	18	.438
Houston	4	–	12	.250	12	–	18	.400
Tulane	3	–	13	.188	13	–	17	.433
UCF*	0	–	10	.000	0	–	12	.000
† 2011 CUSA Tournament winner Rankings from AP Poll; *UCF vacated its wins from the 2010–11 season after it was discovered that there was an ineligible player on the team.

The 2010–11 Memphis Tigers men's basketball team represented the University of Memphis in the 2010–11 college basketball season, the 90th season of Tiger basketball. The Tigers were coached by head coach Josh Pastner (assisted by Glynn Cyprien, Jack Murphy, and Willis Wilson), and played their home games at the FedExForum in Memphis, Tennessee. They are members of Conference USA. They finished the season 25–10, 10–6 in C-USA play and won the 2011 Conference USA men's basketball tournament to earn an automatic bid in the 2011 NCAA Division I men's basketball tournament where they lost in the second round to Arizona.

== Pre-season ==
The 2009–10 Memphis Tigers finished the season with a record of 24–10 (13–3 C-USA). The Tigers finished in second place in C-USA, but were upset in the quarterfinals of the conference tournament by 7 seed and ultimate champion, Houston. For the first time since 2005, the Tigers did not earn a bid to the NCAA tournament. The Tigers accepted an invitation to the 2010 National Invitation Tournament, beating St. John's before being defeated by Ole Miss in the second round.

The Tigers signed a number of highly rated recruits before the 2010–2011 season began, including three native Memphians: Tarik Black of Ridgeway High School, Joe Jackson of White Station High School, and Chris Crawford of Sheffield High School. The incoming freshman class of 2010 also included Will Barton and his brother, Antonio Barton, Jelan Kendrick, and Hippolyte Tsafack. The signing class, which included three All-Americans (Jackson, Will Barton, Kendrick), was rated the country's second best.

=== Departures ===
Name	Number	Pos.	Height	Weight	Year	Hometown	Notes
Tyler Foster	35	G/F	6' 5"	185	Freshman	Albany, New York	Walk-on
James Harvey, Jr.	2	G	6' 2"	200	Freshman	Memphis, Tennessee	Walk-on
Pierre Henderson-Niles	1	F	6' 8"	278	Senior	Memphis, Tennessee	Left team on Feb. 8, 2010
Aaron Jacques	54	F	6' 6"	200	Senior	Bartlett, Tennessee	Walk-on
Willie Kemp	5	G	6' 2"	184	Senior	Bolivar, Tennessee	4th all-time in games played (147); 6th all-time in 3-pt FGs made (162)
Doneal Mack	20	G	6' 5"	187	Senior	Charlotte, North Carolina	3rd all-time in 3-pt FGs made (239); 5th all-time in games played (145); 27th all-time in points scored (1,191); 46th player to score 1,000+ points
Roburt Sallie	3	G	6' 5"	196	Junior	Sacramento, California	Will graduate and transfer 1st all-time in career 3-pt percentage (44.7%, 174–389); 1st all-time in single-season 3-pt percentage (47%, 55–117); 1st all-time in 3-pt FGs (10) and points scored (35) in NCAA tournament game Holds NCAA record for 3-pt FGs made in NCAA tournament (10)
Malik Thomas	32	G/F	6' 4"	195	Freshman	Forestville, Maryland	Walk-on
Elliot Williams	15	G	6' 5"	180	Sophomore	Memphis, Tennessee	Led team scoring average with 17.9 ppg (610 pts); Drafted 22nd overall in the 2010 NBA draft by the Portland Trail Blazers

Statistics accurate as of 29 March 2010.

=== Recruiting ===
College recruiting information
Name	Hometown	School	Height	Weight	Commit date
Antonio Barton; PG	Baltimore, MD	Notre Dame Prep (MA)	6 ft 2 in (1.88 m)	170 lb (77 kg)	Jun 6, 2009
Antonio Barton; PG	Recruit ratings: Scout: Rivals: (87)				
Will Barton; SG	Baltimore, MD	Brewster Academy (NH)	6 ft 6 in (1.98 m)	170 lb (77 kg)	Jun 6, 2009
Will Barton; SG	Recruit ratings: Scout: Rivals: (97)				
Tarik Black; C	Memphis, TN	Ridgeway	6 ft 7 in (2.01 m)	230 lb (100 kg)	Nov 16, 2009
Tarik Black; C	Recruit ratings: Scout: Rivals: (94)				
Chris Crawford; SG	Memphis, TN	Sheffield	6 ft 4 in (1.93 m)	185 lb (84 kg)	Oct 1, 2009
Chris Crawford; SG	Recruit ratings: Scout: Rivals: (91)				
Joe Jackson; PG	Memphis, TN	White Station	5 ft 11 in (1.80 m)	160 lb (73 kg)	Sep 11, 2009
Joe Jackson; PG	Recruit ratings: Scout: Rivals: (96)				
Jelan Kendrick; SF	Marietta, GA	Wheeler	6 ft 6 in (1.98 m)	186 lb (84 kg)	Nov 14, 2009
Jelan Kendrick; SF	Recruit ratings: Scout: Rivals: (95)				
Hippolyte Tsafack; PF	Yaoundé	The Miller School	6 ft 8 in (2.03 m)	230 lb (100 kg)	Nov 11, 2009
Hippolyte Tsafack; PF	Recruit ratings: Scout: Rivals: (91)				
Overall recruit ranking: Scout: 2 Rivals: 2 ESPN: 4
Note: In many cases, Scout, Rivals, 247Sports, On3, and ESPN may conflict in their listings of height and weight.; In these cases, the average was taken. ESPN grades are on a 100-point scale.; Sources: "Memphis Basketball Commitments". Rivals.; "2010 Memphis Basketball Commits". Scout.; "ESPN". ESPN.; "Scout.com Team Recruiting Rankings". Scout.; "2010 Team Ranking". Rivals.

=== Transfers ===
Name	Pos.	Height	Weight	Year	Hometown	Notes
Carmouche, Charles	G	6' 2"	175	Junior	New Orleans, Louisiana	Transferred from University of New Orleans

== Season summary ==
The Tigers began the 2010–2011 season ranked 19th in the AP Poll and the pre-season favorite to win the Conference USA championship. Prior to the team's first regular season game with Centenary, Jelan Kendrick was suspended. After the game, Kendrick asked for permission to seek a transfer and was released.

The team announced on December 10, 2010 that junior forward Wesley Witherspoon would be out a number of weeks as a result of knee surgery. On December 12, 2010, junior forward Angel Garcia left the Tigers to play professionally in Spain.

Highlights of the regular season included wins over pre-season No. 12 Gonzaga and two victories each against both Southern Miss and UAB. However, beset by injuries, transfers, suspensions, and inconsistent play from their heralded freshmen and upperclassmen, the Tigers underachieved relative to their pre-season expectations during a majority of their regular season schedule. The Tigers suffered their worst margin of defeat in the FedEx Forum in several years in their loss to then No. 10 Georgetown on December 23, 2010 by a score of 69–86. The Tigers also lost at Rice, SMU, and East Carolina during their Conference USA schedule.

The Tigers entered the 2011 Conference USA men's basketball tournament as the 4 seed with a 22–9 overall record and 10–6 record in conference. Tournament MVP Joe Jackson led the Tigers to the tournament championship, defeating 5 seed Southern Miss, 8 seed East Carolina, and 3 seed UTEP, which was playing at home, for the conference crown. Jackson sealed the victory against UTEP in the championship game in dramatic fashion, scoring the final two of his 17 points on two free throws with 7.8 seconds remaining, causing the Tigers to take their first lead of the game.

The Tigers earned a 12 seed in the 2011 NCAA tournament, where they were defeated by 5th seeded Arizona Wildcats on Friday March 18, 2011 in Tulsa, Oklahoma by a score of 77–75.

== Roster ==
2010–11 Memphis Tigers men's basketball team
Players
Coaches

Pos.	#	Name	Height	Weight	Year	Hometown
F	0	Will Coleman (C)	6 ft 9 in (2.06 m)	245 lb (111 kg)	Sr	Columbus, Georgia
G	1	Joe Jackson	6 ft 0 in (1.83 m)	170 lb (77 kg)	Fr	Memphis, Tennessee
G	2	Antonio Barton	6 ft 2 in (1.88 m)	165 lb (75 kg)	Fr	Baltimore, Maryland
G	3	Chris Crawford	6 ft 4 in (1.93 m)	205 lb (93 kg)	Fr	Memphis, Tennessee
G	4	Charles Carmouche	6 ft 2 in (1.88 m)	175 lb (79 kg)	Jr	New Orleans, Louisiana
G	5	Will Barton	6 ft 6 in (1.98 m)	175 lb (79 kg)	Fr	Baltimore, Maryland
C	10	Tarik Black (C)	6 ft 8 in (2.03 m)	252 lb (114 kg)	Fr	Memphis, Tennessee
G/F	11	Wesley Witherspoon	6 ft 9 in (2.06 m)	210 lb (95 kg)	Jr	Atlanta, Georgia
G/F	12	Drew Barham	6 ft 7 in (2.01 m)	194 lb (88 kg)	So	Cordova, Tennessee
F	14	Hippolyte Tsafack (redshirt)	6 ft 8 in (2.03 m)	231 lb (105 kg)	Fr	Yaoundé, Cameroon
G	15	Trey Draper	5 ft 10 in (1.78 m)	170 lb (77 kg)	Fr	Memphis, Tennessee
G	23	Charles Holt	5 ft 10 in (1.78 m)	175 lb (79 kg)	So	Memphis, Tennessee
G/F	30	D. J. Stephens	6 ft 5 in (1.96 m)	185 lb (84 kg)	So	Killeen, Texas
G	31	Preston Laird	6 ft 3 in (1.91 m)	189 lb (86 kg)	Jr	Memphis, Tennessee

Head coach

- Josh Pastner (Arizona)

Assistant coach(es)

- Glynn Cyprien (Texas–San Antonio)
- Jack Murphy (Arizona)
- Willis Wilson (Rice)

Legend

- (C) Team captain
- (S) Suspended
- (I) Ineligible
- (W) Walk-on
- Injured
- Current redshirt

Roster
Last update: 15 September 2010

== Schedule ==
Date time, TV	Rank^{#}	Opponent^{#}	Result	Record	Site (attendance) city, state
Exhibition
Wed, Nov 3*; 7:00 pm	No. 19	LeMoyne–Owen	W 106–49		FedExForum; Memphis, TN
Tue, Nov 9*; 7:00 pm	No. 19	Christian Brothers	W 75–49		FedExForum; Memphis, TN
Regular Season
Fri, Nov 12*; 8:00 pm	No. 19	Centenary	W 104–40	1–0	FedExForum (17,792); Memphis, TN
Mon, Nov 15*; 11:00 pm, ESPN	No. 19	Miami (FL); College Hoops Tip-Off Marathon	W 72–68	2–0	FedExForum (17,873); Memphis, TN
Wed, Nov 17*; 7:00 pm	No. 19	Northwestern State	W 94–79	3–0	FedExForum (16,215); Memphis, TN
Sun, Nov 21*; 4:00 pm, CBS CS	No. 19	vs. LSU	W 70–61	4–0	BancorpSouth Arena (7,941); Tupelo, MS
Tue, Nov 23*; 7:00 pm, SS	No. 14	UT Martin	W 102–80	5–0	FedExForum (15,909); Memphis, TN
Wed, Dec 1*; 7:00 pm, SS	No. 14	Arkansas State	W 78–71 ^{OT}	6–0	FedExForum (16,342); Memphis, TN
Sat, Dec 4*; 7:00 pm, CSS	No. 14	Western Kentucky	W 77–61	7–0	FedExForum (17,171); Memphis, TN
Tue, Dec 7*; 6:00 pm, ESPN	No. 13	vs. No. 4 Kansas; Jimmy V Classic	L 68–81	7–1	Madison Square Garden (19,391); New York City, NY
Thu, Dec 16*; 7:00 pm, CSS	No. 18	Austin Peay	W 70–68 ^{OT}	8–1	FedExForum (16,347); Memphis, TN
Mon, Dec 20*; 7:00 pm, SS	No. 16	Texas A&M–Corpus Christi	W 68–63	9–1	FedExForum (16,187); Memphis, TN
Thu, Dec 23*; 7:00 pm, ESPN2	No. 16	No. 10 Georgetown	L 69–86	9–2	FedExForum (17,842); Memphis, TN
Thu, Dec 30*; 7:00 pm, CSS	No. 21	Lipscomb	W 88–70	10–2	FedExForum (17,368); Memphis, TN
Sun, Jan 2*; 2:00 pm, SS	No. 21	Tennessee State	W 91–86	11–2	FedExForum (15,831); Memphis, TN
Wed, Jan 5*; 8:00 pm, ESPN2	No. 21	at Tennessee	L 84–104	11–3	Thompson–Boling Arena (18,664); Knoxville, TN
Sat, Jan 8; 3:00 pm, CSS	No. 21	East Carolina	W 61–58	12–3 (1–0)	FedExForum (16,058); Memphis, TN
Wed, Jan 12; 7:00 pm		at SMU	L 58–64	12–4 (1–1)	Moody Coliseum (2,509); Dallas, TX
Sat, Jan 15; 11:00 am, CSS		Marshall	W 77–61	13–4 (2–1)	FedExForum (15,877); Memphis, TN
Wed, Jan 19; 6:00 pm, CSS		at Southern Miss	W 76–75	14–4 (3–1)	Reed Green Coliseum (5,864); Hattiesburg, MS
Sat, Jan 22; 6:00 pm, ESPN2		at UAB	W 76–73 ^{OT}	15–4 (4–1)	Bartow Arena (9,119); Birmingham, AL
Wed, Jan 26; 7:00 pm, CBS CS		UCF	W 77–61	16–4 (5–1)	FedExForum (17,086); Memphis, TN
Sat, Jan 29; 6:00 pm		at Marshall	L 70–85	16–5 (5–2)	Cam Henderson Center (7,614); Huntington, WV
Wed, Feb 2; 6:00 pm, CBS CS		Tulsa	L 65–68	16–6 (5–3)	FedExForum (15,953); Memphis, TN
Sat, Feb 5*; 3:00 pm, ESPN		at Gonzaga	W 62–58	17–6	Spokane Arena (10,778); Spokane, WA
Wed, Feb 9; 6:00 pm, CBS CS		at UCF	W 63–62	18–6 (6–3)	UCF Arena (7,076); Orlando, FL
Sat, Feb 12; 5:00 pm, ESPN2		Southern Miss; Homecoming	W 67–61	19–6 (7–3)	FedExForum (18,104); Memphis, TN
Wed, Feb 16; 6:00 pm, CBS CS		UAB	W 62–58	20–6 (8–3)	FedExForum (16,818); Memphis, TN
Sat, Feb 19; 7:00 pm, CSS		at Rice	L 52–67	20–7 (8–4)	Tudor Fieldhouse (2,324); Houston, TX
Tue, Feb 22; 8:00 pm, CBS CS		Houston	W 69–58	21–7 (9–4)	FedExForum (16,550); Memphis, TN
Sat, Feb 26; 2:00 pm, ESPN2		at UTEP	L 47–74	21–8 (9–5)	Don Haskins Center (11,334); El Paso, TX
Wed, Mar 2; 6:00 pm, SS		at East Carolina	L 57–68	21–9 (9–6)	Williams Arena at Minges Coliseum (5,856); Greenville, NC
Sat, Mar 5; 3:00 pm, CBS CS		Tulane	W 66–61	22–9 (10–6)	FedExForum (17,278); Memphis, TN
Conference USA Tournament
Thu, Mar 10; 1:30 pm, CBS CS	(4)	vs. (5) Southern Miss; Quarterfinals	W 66–63	23–9	Don Haskins Center (7,085); El Paso, TX
Fri, Mar 11; 5:30 pm, CBS CS	(4)	vs. (8) East Carolina; Semifinals	W 76–56	24–9	Don Haskins Center (9,496); El Paso, TX
Sat, Mar 12; 10:30 am, CBS	(4)	at (3) UTEP; Championship Game	W 67–66	25–9	Don Haskins Center (11,769); El Paso, TX
NCAA Tournament
Fri, Mar 18*; 1:45 pm, CBS	(12W)	vs. (5W) No. 17 Arizona; Second Round	L 75–77	25–10	BOK Center (12,631); Tulsa, OK
*Non-conference game. ^{#}Rankings from AP Poll. (#) Tournament seedings in parentheses. All times are in Central Time.
