= List of Little Rock Trojans men's basketball head coaches =

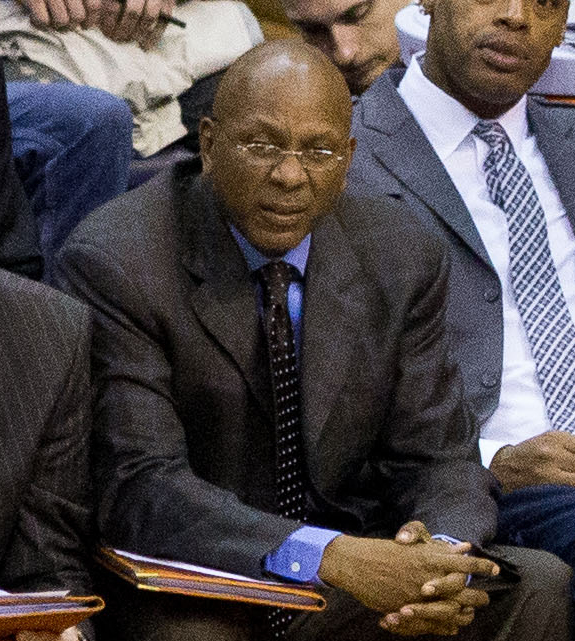
Darrell Walker, the current head coach of the Little Rock Trojans.

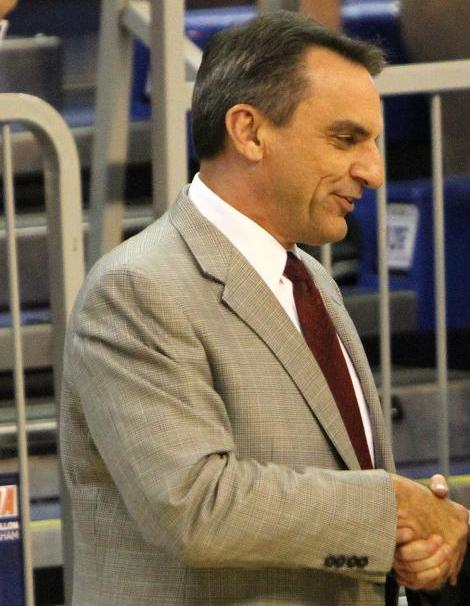
Steve Shields, the winningest head coach in Trojans men's basketball history.

The following is a list of Little Rock Trojans men's basketball head coaches. There have been 24 head coaches of the Trojans in their 85-season history.

Little Rock's current head coach is Travis Ford. He was hired as the Trojans' head coach in March 2026, replacing Darrell Walker, who was fired after the 2025-2026 season.

No.	Tenure	Coach	Years	Record	Pct.
1	1930–1931	John A. Larson	1	9–15	.375
2	1931–1939	Alvin Longstreth	8	21–73	.223
–	1941–1942	No coach	1	6–5	.545
3	1942–1946 (Note: Little Rock did not field a team for the 1944–45 season.)	Herman Bogan	3	38–24	.613
4	1946–1947	George Haynie	1	4–7	.364
5	1947–1948	Deno Nichols	1	11–12	.478
6	1948–1949	David Sibley	1	7–15	.318
7	1949–1950	John Floyd	1	1–20	.048
8	1950–1951	Jim Bearden	1	7–13	.350
9	1951–1953	John Kincannon	2	19–30	.388
10	1953–1956	Woody Johnson	3	25–44	.362
11	1961–1965	Bill Ballard	4	44–55	.444
12	1965–1967	Cleve Branscum	2	23–28	.451
13	1967–1979	Happy Mahfouz	12	122–176	.409
14	1979–1984	Ron Kestenbaum	5	85–52	.620
15	1984–1990	Mike Newell	6	133–60	.689
16	1990–1994	Jim Platt	4	56–59	.487
17	1994–1999	Wimp Sanderson	5	85–58	.594
18	1999–2000	Sidney Moncrief	1	4–24	.143
19	2000–2003	Porter Moser	3	54–34	.614
20	2003–2015	Steve Shields	12	192–178	.519
21	2015–2016	Chris Beard	1	30–5	.857
22	2016–2018	Wes Flanigan	2	22–42	.344
23	2018–present	Darrell Walker	5	61–86	.415
Totals		23 coaches	85 seasons	1,059–1,115	.487
Records updated through end of 2022–23 season Source
