= 2010–11 UCF Knights men's basketball team =

American college basketball season

2010–11 UCF Knights men's basketball

UCF Holiday Classic Champions (vacated)

CBI Semifinals vs. Creighton, L 64–82
- Conference: Conference USA
- Record: 0–12 (Note: UCF vacated its 19 regular season and 2 postseason wins from the 2010–11 season after it was discovered that there was an ineligible player on the team. The team's pre-sanctions record was 21–12 (6–10). The "official" record therefore stands as 0–12.) (0–10 C-USA)
- Head coach: Donnie Jones
- Assistant coaches: Shawn Finney; Darren Tillis; Tim Thomas
- Home arena: UCF Arena

2010–11 Conference USA men's basketball standings
	Conf.				Overall
Team	W		L	PCT	W		L	PCT
UAB	12	–	4	.750	22	–	9	.710
Tulsa	11	–	5	.688	19	–	13	.594
UTEP	11	–	5	.688	25	–	10	.714
Memphis †	10	–	6	.625	25	–	10	.714
Southern Miss	9	–	7	.563	22	–	10	.688
Marshall	9	–	7	.563	22	–	12	.647
SMU	8	–	8	.500	20	–	15	.571
East Carolina	8	–	8	.500	18	–	16	.529
Rice	5	–	11	.313	14	–	18	.438
Houston	4	–	12	.250	12	–	18	.400
Tulane	3	–	13	.188	13	–	17	.433
UCF*	0	–	10	.000	0	–	12	.000
† 2011 CUSA Tournament winner Rankings from AP Poll; *UCF vacated its wins from the 2010–11 season after it was discovered that there was an ineligible player on the team.

The 2010–11 UCF Knights men's basketball team was an NCAA Division I college basketball team that represented the University of Central Florida and competed in Conference USA. They played their home games at UCF Arena in Orlando, Florida and were led by first-year head coach Donnie Jones.

Following a 10–0 start to the season, in which they defeated #18 Florida, South Florida, and Miami, the Knights were nationally ranked for the first time in program history. At the time, UCF was one of only four schools to be ranked in the BCS standings and the AP men's basketball poll.

They finished the season 21–12, 6–10 in CUSA play and lost in the first round of the 2011 Conference USA men's basketball tournament to East Carolina. They were invited to the 2011 College Basketball Invitational, where they beat St. Bonaventure in the first round and Rhode Island in the quarterfinals before falling to Creighton in the semifinals.

In February 2012, UCF vacated its wins from the 2010–11 season after it was discovered that there was an ineligible player on the team.

== Previous season ==
In the previous year, the Knights finished the season 15–17, 6–10 in C-USA play under the leadership of Head Coach Kirk Speraw. After the season, Speraw was fired and replaced by Donnie Jones .

All of UCF's wins from the 2009–10 season were later vacated.

== Roster ==
Name	Number	Position	Height	Weight	Year	Hometown
Keith Clanton	33	F	6–8	245	Sophomore	Orlando, Florida
Josh Crittle	24	F	6–8	250	Junior	Bellwood, Illinois
Jarvis Davis	2	G	6–1	175	Freshman	Columbia, South Carolina
David Diakite	15	F	6–6	215	Redshirt sophomore	Washington, D.C.
P. J. Gaynor	21	F	6–8	205	Junior	Jacksonville, Florida
Tom Herzog	41	C	7–0	250	Redshirt senior	Flint, Michigan
Jeffrey Jordan	13	G	6–1	180	Senior	Chicago
Marcus Jordan	5	G	6–3	205	Sophomore	Chicago
Doğukan Kuzucan	14	G	6–2	175	Sophomore	Istanbul, Turkey
Dwight McCombs	10	F/C	6–8	245	Junior	Chicago
A. J. Rompza	3	G	5–9	160	Junior	Chicago
Isaac Sosa	11	G	6–3	190	Junior	Guaynabo, Puerto Rico
Tristan Spurlock	1	F	6–8	220	Sophomore	Woodbridge, Virginia
Isaiah Sykes	32	G/F	6–5	205	Freshman	Detroit, Michigan
Amara Thompson	22	G	6–4	180	Redshirt sophomore	Tucker, Georgia
Taylor Young	12	G	6–1	185	Redshirt senior	Orlando, Florida
A. J. Tyler	25	F	6–9	225	Redshirt senior	Palm Harbor, Florida

=== Coaches ===
Name	Type	College	Graduating year
Donnie Jones	Head coach	Pikeville College	1988
Shawn Finney	Associate head coach	Fairmont State	1985
Darren Tillis	Assistant coach	Paul Quinn College	1996
Tim Thomas	Assistant coach	Wheeling Jesuit	1993
Micah Byars	Director of basketball operations	University of West Florida	2006
Brendan Suhr	Director of program development	Montclair State	1973

== Schedule and results ==
Date time, TV	Rank^{#}	Opponent^{#}	Result	Record	Site city, state
Exhibition
November 4, 2010*; 7:00 pm		Flagler	W 78–70	1–0	UCF Arena; Orlando, Florida
Regular season
November 12, 2010*; 7:00 pm		West Florida	W 115–61	1–0	UCF Arena (5,865); Orlando, Florida
November 15, 2010*; 7:00 pm		Jackson State	W 80–39	2–0	UCF Arena (6,333); Orlando, Florida
November 18, 2010*; 7:00 pm, CBS CS		South Florida; UCF–USF rivalry	W 65–59	3–0	UCF Arena (7,653); Orlando, Florida
November 23, 2010*; 7:00 pm		at Stetson	W 85–58	4–0	Edmunds Center (4,249); DeLand, Florida
November 27, 2010*; 5:00 pm		Alabama State	W 84–48	5–0	UCF Arena (3,660); Orlando, Florida
December 1, 2010*; 7:00 pm, FS Florida		vs. No. 18 Florida; Florida Citrus Shootout	W 57–54	6–0	Amway Center (13,909); Orlando, Florida
December 4, 2010*; 4:00 pm		Southeastern Louisiana	W 74–49	7–0	UCF Arena (6,293); Orlando, Florida
December 11, 2010*; 5:00 pm, BHSN/ CSS		Bethune–Cookman	W 76–59	8–0	UCF Arena (5,094); Orlando, Florida
December 15, 2010*; 7:00 pm		Louisiana–Lafayette	W 79–58	9–0	UCF Arena (4,338); Orlando, Florida
December 18, 2010*; 1:00 pm, FSN		vs. Miami (FL); Orange Bowl Basketball Classic	W 84–78	10–0	BankAtlantic Center (13,489); Sunrise, Florida
December 22, 2010*; 7:00 pm	No. 24	at UMass	W 64–59	11–0	Mullins Center (4,432); Amherst, Massachusetts
December 29, 2010*; 7:00 pm	No. 19	Furman; UCF Holiday Classic	W 71–53	12–0	UCF Arena (7,111); Orlando, Florida
December 30, 2010*; 7:30 pm	No. 19	Princeton; UCF Holiday Classic	W 68–62	13–0	UCF Arena (5,591); Orlando, Florida
January 5, 2011; 7:00 pm, BHSN/ CSS	No. 19	Marshall	W 65–58	14–0 (1–0)	UCF Arena (9,094); Orlando, Florida
January 8, 2011; 5:00 pm	No. 19	at Houston	L 71–76	14–1 (1–1)	Hofheinz Pavilion (3,458); Houston, Texas
January 15, 2011; 5:00 pm	No. 23	at Southern Miss	L 69–86	14–2 (1–2)	Reed Green Coliseum (5,023); Hattiesburg, Mississippi
January 19, 2011; 7:00 pm, BHSN		East Carolina	L 62–74	14–3 (1–3)	UCF Arena (8,044); Orlando, Florida
January 22, 2011; 7:00 pm, BHSN/ CSS		Rice	L 50–57	14–4 (1–4)	UCF Arena (9,347); Orlando, Florida
January 26, 2011; 8:00 pm, BHSN/ CBS CS		at Memphis	L 61–77	14–5 (1–5)	FedExForum (17,086); Memphis, Tennessee
January 29, 2011; 7:00 pm, BHSN/ CSS		UAB	L 69–74	14–6 (1–6)	UCF Arena (7,431); Orlando, Florida
February 2, 2011 (Note: Rescheduled to February 21 due to winter storm in El Paso); 9:00 pm		at UTEP			Don Haskins Center; El Paso, Texas
February 5, 2011; 5:00 pm		at East Carolina	L 61–68	14–7 (1–7)	Williams Arena at Minges Coliseum (6,567); Greenville, North Carolina
February 9, 2011; 7:00 pm, BHSN/ CBS CS		Memphis	L 62–63	14–8 (1–8)	UCF Arena (7,076); Orlando, Florida
February 12, 2011; 7:00 pm		Tulsa	W 58–57	15–8 (2–8)	UCF Arena (7,008); Orlando, Florida
February 16, 2011; 8:00 pm		at Tulane	W 65–62	16–8 (3–8)	Avron B. Fogelman Arena (1,864); New Orleans
February 19, 2011; 6:00 pm, BHSN/ CSS		at UAB	L 58–63	16–9 (3–9)	Bartow Arena (7,061); Birmingham, Alabama
February 21, 2011; 1:00 pm		at UTEP	W 74–68	17–9 (4–9)	Don Haskins Center (9,824); El Paso, Texas
February 26, 2011; 7:00 pm		Southern Miss	W 65–64	18–9 (5–9)	UCF Arena (7,402); Orlando, Florida
March 2, 2011; 7:00 pm, BHSN		SMU	W 51–48	19–9 (6–9)	UCF Arena (6,802); Orlando, Florida
March 5, 2011; 7:00 pm		at Marshall	L 69–83	19–10 (6–10)	Cam Henderson Center (9,036); Huntington, West Virginia
Conference USA Tournament
March 9, 2011; 1:00 pm	(9)	vs. (8) East Carolina; First Round	L 60–75	19–11	Don Haskins Center (6,841); El Paso, Texas
College Basketball Invitational
March 16, 2011*; 8:00 pm, HDNet		St. Bonaventure; First Round	W 69–54	20–11	UCF Arena (2,945); Orlando, Florida
March 21, 2011*; 7:00 pm		Rhode Island; Quarterfinals	W 66–54	21–11	UCF Arena (3,949); Orlando, Florida
March 23, 2011*; 8:00 pm, HDNet		at Creighton; Semifinals	L 64–82	21–12	Qwest Center Omaha (6,392); Omaha, Nebraska
*Non-Conference Game. Rankings from AP poll. All times are in Eastern Time. **The game on February 2 at UTEP was canceled due to inclement weather and rescheduled for February 21.

== Rankings ==
Ranking movement Legend: ██ Increase in ranking. ██ Decrease in ranking. ██Not ranked the previous week.
Poll	Pre Oct 28	Wk 1 Nov 15	Wk 2 Nov 22	Wk 3 Nov 29	Wk 4 Dec 6	Wk 5 Dec 13	Wk 6 Dec 20	Wk 7 Dec 27	Wk 8 Jan 3	Wk 9 Jan 10	Wk 10 Jan 17	Wk 11 Jan 24	Wk 12 Jan 31	Wk 13 Feb 7	Wk 14 Feb 14	Wk 15 Feb 21	Wk 16 Feb 28	Wk 17 Mar 7	Wk 18 Mar 14	Wk 19 Mar 21	Final
AP	—	—	—	—	RV	RV	24	19	19	23	RV	—	—	—	—	—	—	—	—	—	—
Coaches	—	—	—	—	RV	RV	RV	21	18	22	RV	—	—	—	—	—	—	—	—	—	—
