= 2011 Sun Belt Conference men's basketball tournament =

- Classification: Division I
- Season: 2010–11
- Teams: 12
- Site: Summit Arena; Convention Center Court; Hot Springs, Arkansas
- Champions: Arkansas-Little Rock (1st title)
- Winning coach: Steve Shields (1st title)
- MVP: Solomon Bozeman (Arkansas-Little Rock)
- Television: ESPN Regional Television, ESPNU

2010–11 Sun Belt Conference men's basketball standings
	Conf.				Overall
Team	W		L	PCT	W		L	PCT
East
Florida Atlantic	13	–	3	.813	21	–	10	.677
Middle Tennessee	10	–	6	.625	16	–	16	.500
Western Kentucky	8	–	8	.500	16	–	16	.500
South Alabama	6	–	10	.375	13	–	16	.448
Troy	6	–	10	.375	8	–	21	.276
FIU	5	–	11	.313	11	–	19	.367
West
Arkansas State	11	–	5	.688	17	–	15	.531
Louisiana–Lafayette	11	–	5	.688	14	–	15	.483
Denver	9	–	7	.563	13	–	17	.433
North Texas	8	–	8	.500	22	–	11	.667
Arkansas–Little Rock †	7	–	9	.438	19	–	17	.528
Louisiana–Monroe	2	–	14	.125	7	–	24	.226
† 2011 Sun Belt Conference tournament winner Rankings from AP Poll

The 2011 Sun Belt Conference men's basketball tournament was held in Hot Springs, Arkansas from March 5 to March 8 at the Summit Arena and the Convention Center Court. All 12 Sun Belt teams participated in the tournament and their seedings are based on their conference record.

== Format ==
The 12 members of the Sun Belt are split into two six team divisions. The top two seeds from both divisions receive byes to the quarterfinals. The first round will see inter-divisional match ups where the 3 will play the 6 seed and the 4 will play the 5 seed. The winners of the 3/6 match ups will play the 2 seeds and the winners of the 4/5 match ups will play the 1 seeds. The championship game will be broadcast on ESPN2.

== Bracket ==
First round Saturday, March 5, 2011
E3	Western Kentucky	66
W6	Louisiana–Monroe	50
E5	Troy	69
W4	North Texas	83
E6	FIU	53
W3	Denver	49
E4	South Alabama	68
W5	Arkansas–Little Rock	82

Quarterfinals; Sunday, March 6, 2011
W2	Louisiana–Lafayette	76
E3	Western Kentucky	81
E1	Florida Atlantic	64
W4	North Texas	78
E2	Middle Tennessee	73
E6	FIU	38
W1	Arkansas State	52
W5	Arkansas–Little Rock	59

Semifinals; Monday, March 7, 2011
E3	Western Kentucky	62
W4	North Texas	81
E2	Middle Tennessee	56
W5	Arkansas–Little Rock	65

Championship Game; Tuesday, March 8, 2011
W4	North Texas	63
W5	Arkansas–Little Rock	64
