= 2011 Conference USA men's basketball tournament =

- Classification: Division I
- Season: 2010–11
- Teams: 12
- Site: Don Haskins Center; El Paso, Texas
- Champions: Memphis (5th title)
- Winning coach: Josh Pastner (1st title)
- MVP: Joe Jackson (Memphis)
- Television: CBS College Sports; CBS

2010–11 Conference USA men's basketball standings
	Conf.				Overall
Team	W		L	PCT	W		L	PCT
UAB	12	–	4	.750	22	–	9	.710
Tulsa	11	–	5	.688	19	–	13	.594
UTEP	11	–	5	.688	25	–	10	.714
Memphis †	10	–	6	.625	25	–	10	.714
Southern Miss	9	–	7	.563	22	–	10	.688
Marshall	9	–	7	.563	22	–	12	.647
SMU	8	–	8	.500	20	–	15	.571
East Carolina	8	–	8	.500	18	–	16	.529
Rice	5	–	11	.313	14	–	18	.438
Houston	4	–	12	.250	12	–	18	.400
Tulane	3	–	13	.188	13	–	17	.433
UCF*	0	–	10	.000	0	–	12	.000
† 2011 CUSA Tournament winner Rankings from AP Poll; *UCF vacated its wins from the 2010–11 season after it was discovered that there was an ineligible player on the team.

The 2011 Conference USA men's basketball tournament was held March 9–12, 2011, at the Don Haskins Center in El Paso, Texas.

Seeding for the tournament was determined by the conference standings at the end of the regular season. Memphis defeated UTEP in the conference final by a score of 67–66. Memphis, as tournament champion, received an automatic bid to the 2011 NCAA Men's Division I Basketball Tournament.

== Bracket ==
The tournament took place March 9–12.

First round March 9
8	East Carolina	75
9	UCF	60
5	Southern Miss	63
12	Tulane	47
7	SMU	57
10	Rice	58
6	Marshall	97
11	Houston	87

Quarterfinals; March 10
1	UAB	70
8	East Carolina	75*
4	Memphis	66
5	Southern Miss	63
2	Tulsa	81
10	Rice	72
3	UTEP	77
6	Marshall	65

Semifinals; March 11
8	East Carolina	56
4	Memphis	76
2	Tulsa	54
3	UTEP	66

Championship game March 12
4	Memphis	67
3	UTEP	66

* denotes game ended in overtime.
