= 2010–11 Houston Cougars men's basketball team =

American college basketball season

2010–11 Houston Cougars men's basketball
- Conference: Conference USA
- Record: 12–18 (4–12 C-USA)
- Head coach: James Dickey (1st season)
- Associate head coach: Alvin Brooks
- Assistant coaches: Daniyal Robinson; Ulric Maligi (1st season)
- Home arena: Hofheinz Pavilion

2010–11 Conference USA men's basketball standings
	Conf.				Overall
Team	W		L	PCT	W		L	PCT
UAB	12	–	4	.750	22	–	9	.710
Tulsa	11	–	5	.688	19	–	13	.594
UTEP	11	–	5	.688	25	–	10	.714
Memphis †	10	–	6	.625	25	–	10	.714
Southern Miss	9	–	7	.563	22	–	10	.688
Marshall	9	–	7	.563	22	–	12	.647
SMU	8	–	8	.500	20	–	15	.571
East Carolina	8	–	8	.500	18	–	16	.529
Rice	5	–	11	.313	14	–	18	.438
Houston	4	–	12	.250	12	–	18	.400
Tulane	3	–	13	.188	13	–	17	.433
UCF*	0	–	10	.000	0	–	12	.000
† 2011 CUSA Tournament winner Rankings from AP Poll; *UCF vacated its wins from the 2010–11 season after it was discovered that there was an ineligible player on the team.

The 2010–11 Houston Cougars men's basketball team represented the University of Houston in the college basketball 2010–11 season. It is their 66th year of season play. The head coach for the Cougars was James Dickey, who was serving in his 1st year in that position. The team played its home games at Hofheinz Pavilion on-campus in Houston and are members of Conference USA.

With a win over #19 UCF during mid-season play, Houston defeated a nationally ranked opponent at home for the first time since the 2005 season.

== Roster ==
Trumaine Johnson played ten games with Houston during the season, but left the team due to "personal reasons" on January 14, 2011.

2010–11 Houston Cougars men's basketball team
Players
Coaches

Pos.	#	Name	Height	Weight	Year	Hometown
G	0	Joe Young (I)	6 ft 3 in (1.91 m)	185 lb (84 kg)	Fr	Houston, Texas
F	1	Mikhail McLean	6 ft 8 in (2.03 m)	205 lb (93 kg)	Fr	Houston, Texas
G	2	Zamal Nixon	6 ft 1 in (1.85 m)	170 lb (77 kg)	Sr	Brooklyn, New York
F	3	Maurice McNeil	6 ft 9 in (2.06 m)	225 lb (102 kg)	Sr	New York, New York
G	4	Cory Tellis	5 ft 10 in (1.78 m)	220 lb (100 kg)	Sr	Friendswood, Texas
G	5	Nick Haywood	6 ft 0 in (1.83 m)	170 lb (77 kg)	So	Monroe, Louisiana
G	11	Darian Thibodeaux	6 ft 3 in (1.91 m)	175 lb (79 kg)	Jr	Dallas, Texas
F	21	Alandise Harris	6 ft 6 in (1.98 m)	230 lb (104 kg)	Fr	Little Rock, Arkansas
G	31	Adam Brown	6 ft 4 in (1.93 m)	175 lb (79 kg)	Sr	San Antonio, Texas
F	32	Kirk Van Slyke	6 ft 9 in (2.06 m)	215 lb (98 kg)	So	The Woodlands, Texas
G	33	Trumaine Johnson (S)	6 ft 2 in (1.88 m)	190 lb (86 kg)	RS Jr	Houston, Texas
F	40	Kendrick Washington	6 ft 7 in (2.01 m)	260 lb (118 kg)	So	Shreveport, Louisiana

Head coach

- James Dickey (Central Arkansas)

Assistant coach(es)

- Alvin Brooks (Lamar)
- Daniyal Robinson (Little Rock)
- Ulric Maligi (Howard)

Legend

- (C) Team captain
- (S) Suspended
- (I) Ineligible
- (W) Walk-on
- Injured
- Current redshirt

Roster
Last update: 2010-11-22

=== Incoming recruits ===
This season, Houston had five incoming recruits. Freshman Joe Young, who is the son of Phi Slama Jama-era Houston player and former NBA player Michael Young, had originally committed and signed a National Letter of Intent (NLI) to play at Providence, but chose to play for Houston instead. Although Young requested a release from his NLI, Providence head coach Keno Davis denied it. Young then appealed to the National Letter of Intent advisory committee, but the denial was upheld. Due to the rules of the NCAA, Young is being treated as a transfer student, and is required to sit-out for all games this season. However, he will be eligible to play during the 2011–12 season.

Trumaine Johnson transferred to Houston from San Diego where he played as a guard. Johnson cited racial discrimination against the University of San Diego, and is currently suing the school. Johnson played ten games with Houston until he sustained an ankle injury. Following the injury, he remained with the team for the next four games, but did not play. On January 14, 2011, it was announced that Johnson had left the team for personal reasons.

Houston had several other recruits, but granted releases to them prior to the beginning of the season. Marial Dhal, a 7' 3" center from Uganda, originally committed to Houston on May 1, 2010 and signed an NLI, but was granted a release after head coach Tom Penders stepped down from his position. He then committed, and began play for Canisius. In a similar fashion, Devon Lamb, who had verbally committed to Houston on February 15, 2010, chose to play for Lamar also due to a change of staff.

Fabyon Harris of Chicago originally committed on May 10, 2010, and eventually signed an NLI to Houston, but was granted a release for "personal and family" reasons on August 16, 2010. He then committed to playing for Howard College in the NJCAA, but was dismissed from the team before the season began following an arrest in which Harris had shoplifted a television from a Wal-Mart retail store in Big Spring, Texas with two other teammates.

College recruiting information
Name	Hometown	School	Height	Weight	Commit date
Alandise Harris; SF	Little Rock, Arkansas	Central HS	6 ft 6 in (1.98 m)	230 lb (100 kg)	Jun 16, 2010
Alandise Harris; SF	Recruit ratings: Scout: (89)				
Darian Thibodeaux; SG	Dallas, Texas	Kimball HS / Navarro JC	6 ft 3 in (1.91 m)	173 lb (78 kg)	May 1, 2010
Darian Thibodeaux; SG	Recruit ratings: Scout: Rivals: (40)				
Joe Young; SG	Houston, Texas	Yates HS	6 ft 2 in (1.88 m)	180 lb (82 kg)	Aug 23, 2010
Joe Young; SG	Recruit ratings: Scout: Rivals: (93)				
Mikhail McLean; PF	Houston, Texas	Second Baptist	6 ft 7 in (2.01 m)	203 lb (92 kg)	Apr 28, 2010
Mikhail McLean; PF	Recruit ratings: Scout: Rivals: (86)				
Trumaine Johnson; SG	Humble, Texas	Kingwood HS / San Diego	6 ft 2 in (1.88 m)	190 lb (86 kg)	Jul 16, 2010
Trumaine Johnson; SG	Recruit ratings: Scout: Rivals: (40)				
Overall recruit ranking: Scout: Unranked Rivals: Unranked
Note: In many cases, Scout, Rivals, 247Sports, On3, and ESPN may conflict in their listings of height and weight.; In these cases, the average was taken. ESPN grades are on a 100-point scale.; Sources: "Houston 2010 Basketball Commitments". Rivals.; "2010 Houston Basketball Commits". Scout.; "ESPN". ESPN.; "Scout.com Team Recruiting Rankings". Scout.; "2010 Team Ranking". Rivals.

== Schedule ==
Date time, TV	Rank^{#}	Opponent^{#}	Result	Record	Site city, state
Exhibition
2010/11/06*; 4:00PM		Abilene Christian	W 71–68	—	Hofheinz Pavilion; Houston, Texas
Regular season
2010/11/12*; 7:00PM		Nicholls State	W 63–62 ^{OT}	1–0	Hofheinz Pavilion (2,622); Houston, Texas
2009/11/14*; 2:00PM		Alcorn State	W 88–68	2–0	Hofheinz Pavilion (2,419); Houston, Texas
2010/11/17*; 7:00PM		at Louisiana Tech	L 54–60	2–1	Thomas Assembly Center (1,840); Ruston, Louisiana
2010/11/20*; 2:00PM		Northwestern Oklahoma State	W 81–58	3–1	Hofheinz Pavilion (2,683); Houston, Texas
2010/11/23*; 7:00PM		Louisiana–Lafayette	W 78–65	4–1	Hofheinz Pavilion (2,889); Houston, Texas
2010/11/27*; 3:00PM		at TCU	L 63–79	4–2	Daniel–Meyer Coliseum (3,480); Fort Worth, Texas
2010/11/30*; 7:00PM		at LSU	L 57–79	4–3	Pete Maravich Assembly Center (6,688); Baton Rouge, Louisiana
2010/12/04*; 2:00PM, SLC TV		at Sam Houston State	W 75–71 ^{OT}	5–3	Bernard Johnson Coliseum (1,974); Huntsville, Texas
2010/12/06*; 7:00PM, CSS		Nevada	W 64–61	6–3	Hofheinz Pavilion (2,712); Houston, Texas
2010/12/11*; 6:00PM, CSS		UTSA	L 63–68	6–4	Hofheinz Pavilion (2,955); Houston, Texas
2010/12/18*; 7:00PM		at Texas A&M–Corpus Christi	L 78–81 ^{OT}	6–5	American Bank Center (2,022); Corpus Christi, Texas
2010/12/21*; 7:00PM		Sam Houston State	W 75–73	7–5	Hofheinz Pavilion (3,934); Houston, Texas
2010/12/30*; 6:00PM		Rogers State	W 85–48	8–5	Hofheinz Pavilion (2,951); Houston, Texas
2011/01/05; 8:00PM, CSS		at Southern Miss	L 73–85	8–6 (0–1)	Reed Green Coliseum (2,796); Hattiesburg, Mississippi
2011/01/08; 4:00PM		No. 19 UCF	W 76–71	9–6 (1–1)	Hofheinz Pavilion (3,458); Houston, Texas
2011/01/15; 2:00PM		at SMU	W 70–68	10–6 (2–1)	Moody Coliseum (1,721); Dallas, Texas
2011/01/19; 6:00PM, CBS CS		at Tulsa	W 64–57	11–6 (3–1)	Hofheinz Pavilion (3,617); Houston, Texas
2011/01/22; 7:00PM		UTEP	L 52–57	11–7 (3–2)	Hofheinz Pavilion (4,513); Houston, Texas
2011/01/26; 8:00PM, CSS		at Rice; Bayou Cup	L 71–79	11–8 (3–3)	Tudor Fieldhouse (2,312); Houston, Texas
2011/01/29; 5:00PM, CSS		at East Carolina	L 70–74	11–9 (3–4)	Williams Arena at Minges Coliseum (6,308); Greenville, North Carolina
2011/02/01; 8:00PM, CBS CS		Marshall	L 62–63	11–10 (3–5)	Hofheinz Pavilion (3,021); Houston, Texas
2011/02/05; 7:05PM		at Tulsa	L 71–76 ^{OT}	11–11 (3–6)	Reynolds Center (5,126); Tulsa, Oklahoma
2011/02/12; 4:00PM		Tulane	W 79-68	12-11 (4-6)	Hofheinz Pavilion (5,144); Houston, Texas
2011/02/16; 7:00PM		SMU	L 51-65	12-12 (4-7)	Hofheinz Pavilion (3,025); Houston, Texas
2011/02/19; 8:05PM, CBS CS		at UTEP	L 64-76	12-13 (4-8)	Don Haskins Center (11,173); El Paso, Texas
2011/02/22; 8:00PM, CBS CS		at Memphis	L 58-69	12-14 (4-9)	FedExForum (16,550); Memphis, Tennessee
2011/02/26; 5:00PM, CBS CS		UAB	L 55-68	12-15 (4-10)	Hofheinz Pavilion (3,072); Houston, Texas
2011/03/02; 7:00PM		at Tulane	L 77-80	12-16 (4-11)	Avron B. Fogelman Arena (1,819); New Orleans, Louisiana
2011/03/05; 5:00PM		Rice; Bayou Cup	L 57-72	12-17 (4-12)	Hofheinz Pavilion (3,473); Houston, Texas
Conference USA Tournament
2011/03/09; 6:30PM	(11)	vs. (6) Marshall; First round	L 87-97	12-18	Don Haskins Center (6,916); El Paso, Texas
*Non-conference game. ^{#}Rankings from AP Poll. (#) Tournament seedings in parentheses. All times are in Central Standard Time.
