= 2010–11 Florida Atlantic Owls men's basketball team =

American college basketball season

2010–11 Florida Atlantic Owls men's basketball

Sun Belt Regular Season champions

NIT, First round
- Conference: Sun Belt Conference
- East Division
- Record: 21–11 (13–3 SBC)
- Head coach: Mike Jarvis (3rd season)
- Associate head coach: Mike Jarvis II
- Assistant coaches: Matt McCall; Steve Welch
- Home arena: FAU Arena

2010–11 Sun Belt Conference men's basketball standings
	Conf.				Overall
Team	W		L	PCT	W		L	PCT
East
Florida Atlantic	13	–	3	.813	21	–	10	.677
Middle Tennessee	10	–	6	.625	16	–	16	.500
Western Kentucky	8	–	8	.500	16	–	16	.500
South Alabama	6	–	10	.375	13	–	16	.448
Troy	6	–	10	.375	8	–	21	.276
FIU	5	–	11	.313	11	–	19	.367
West
Arkansas State	11	–	5	.688	17	–	15	.531
Louisiana–Lafayette	11	–	5	.688	14	–	15	.483
Denver	9	–	7	.563	13	–	17	.433
North Texas	8	–	8	.500	22	–	11	.667
Arkansas–Little Rock †	7	–	9	.438	19	–	17	.528
Louisiana–Monroe	2	–	14	.125	7	–	24	.226
† 2011 Sun Belt Conference tournament winner Rankings from AP Poll

The 2010–11 Florida Atlantic Owls men's basketball team represented Florida Atlantic University in the 2010–11 NCAA Division I men's basketball season. The Owls, led by head coach Mike Jarvis, played their home games at FAU Arena in Boca Raton, Florida, as members of the Sun Belt Conference. The Owls were regular-season champions in the Sun Belt Conference, but were upset in their first game of the Sun Belt Conference tournament by North Texas.

Florida Atlantic failed to qualify for the NCAA tournament, but received an automatic bid to the 2011 NIT as the regular-season champions of the Sun Belt. The Owls were eliminated in the first round of the NIT by Miami, 85–62.

== Roster ==
2010–11 Florida Atlantic Owls men's basketball team
Players
Coaches

Pos.	#	Name	Height	Weight	Year	Hometown
G	1	Shavar Richardson	6 ft 3 in (1.91 m)	—	Jr	Brooklyn, New York
G	2	Raymond Taylor	5 ft 6 in (1.68 m)	—	So	Miami, Florida
F	4	Andre Mattison	6 ft 7 in (2.01 m)	—	So	Washington, D.C.
G	5	Alex Tucker	5 ft 11 in (1.8 m)	—	Jr	San Pedro, California
G	10	Dennis Mavin	6 ft 3 in (1.91 m)	—	Fr	Gainesville, Florida
G	12	Dylan O'Sullivan	6 ft 3 in (1.91 m)	—	So	Fort Lauderdale, Florida
F	21	Jordan McCoy	6 ft 6 in (1.98 m)	—	So	Orlando, Florida
G	22	Greg Gantt	6 ft 2 in (1.88 m)	—	So	Gainesville, Florida
G	25	Pablo Bertone	6 ft 4 in (1.93 m)	—	Fr	Arroyito, Argentina
G	35	Darren Stewart	6 ft 4 in (1.93 m)	—	So	Pembroke Pines, Florida
F	40	Brett Royster	6 ft 8 in (2.03 m)	—	Sr	Arlington, Texas
F	50	DeMonte Simpson	6 ft 9 in (2.06 m)	—	So	Knoxville, Tennessee
F	52	Kore White	6 ft 8 in (2.03 m)	—	RS So	Fort Lauderdale, Florida
C	55	Justin Davis	6 ft 10 in (2.08 m)	—	RS Jr	Jacksonville, Florida

Head coach

- Mike Jarvis (Northeastern)

Assistant coach(es)

- Mike Jarvis II (Boston University)
- Matt McCall (Florida)
- Tim Kaine (Winthrop)

Legend

- (C) Team captain
- (S) Suspended
- (I) Ineligible
- (W) Walk-on
- Injured
- Current redshirt

Roster
Last update: January 14, 2023

== Schedule and results ==
Date time, TV	Rank^{#}	Opponent^{#}	Result	Record	Site (attendance) city, state
Exhibition
November 4, 2010*; 7:00 pm		Northwood (FL)	L 81–85 ^{OT}	—	FAU Arena; Boca Raton, FL
November 8, 2010*; 7:00 pm		Lynn	W 81–61	—	FAU Arena; Boca Raton, FL
Regular season
November 12, 2010*; 7:00 pm		vs. UC Davis; Athletes in Action Classic	W 70–63	1–0	Chiles Center (647); Portland, OR
November 13, 2010*; 7:30 pm		vs. Milwaukee; Athletes in Action Classic	W 85–76	2–0	Chiles Center; Portland, OR
November 14, 2010*; 8:30 pm		at Portland; Athletes in Action Classic	L 75–89	2–1	Chiles Center (1,164); Portland, OR
November 17, 2010*; 7:00 pm		Warner	W 88–58	3–1	FAU Arena (952); Boca Raton, FL
November 20, 2010*; 1:00 pm		American	L 72–82	3–2	FAU Arena (646); Boca Raton, FL
November 23, 2010*; 7:00 pm		at No. 16 Florida	L 66–79	3–3	O'Connell Center (8,006); Gainesville, FL
November 27, 2010*; 4:00 pm		at George Mason	L 51–66	3–4	Patriot Center (3,907); Fairfax, VA
November 30, 2010*; 8:00 pm		at Mississippi State	W 80–70	4–4	Humphrey Coliseum (4,204); Starkville, MS
December 4, 2010*; 8:00 pm		South Florida	W 50–42	5–4	FAU Arena (1,593); Boca Raton, FL
December 11, 2010*; 4:00 pm		at Hofstra	W 63–59	6–4	Mack Sports Complex (2,514); Hempstead, NY
December 13, 2010*; 7:15 pm		at Siena	L 69–72	6–5	Times Union Center (6,730); Albany, NY
December 16, 2010; 8:00 pm		at Troy	W 82–77 ^{OT}	7–5 (1–0)	Sartain Hall (423); Troy, AL
December 19, 2010; 7:00 pm		at Louisiana–Monroe	W 60–58	8–5 (2–0)	Fant–Ewing Coliseum (793); Monroe, LA
December 22, 2010*; 8:30 pm		at DePaul	L 62–71	8–6	Allstate Arena (7,823); Rosemont, IL
January 3, 2011*; 7:00 pm		Florida Memorial	W 94–76	9–6	FAU Arena (533); Boca Raton, FL
January 6, 2011; 7:00 pm		South Alabama	W 65–57	10–6 (3–0)	FAU Arena (719); Boca Raton, FL
January 8, 2011; 7:00 pm		Arkansas State	W 61–57	11–6 (4–0)	FAU Arena (1,339); Boca Raton, FL
January 11, 2011*; 7:00 pm		Manhattan	W 57–50	12–6	FAU Arena (1,064); Boca Raton, FL
January 13, 2011; 8:00 pm		at Middle Tennessee	W 71–61	13–6 (5–0)	Murphy Center (2,413); Murfreesboro, TN
January 15, 2011; 8:00 pm		at Western Kentucky	W 78–73	14–6 (6–0)	E. A. Diddle Arena (2,918); Bowling Green, KY
January 22, 2011; 1:00 pm		Arkansas–Little Rock	W 88–71	15–6 (7–0)	FAU Arena (2,343); Boca Raton, FL
January 27, 2011; 7:00 pm		Middle Tennessee	W 62–51	16–6 (8–0)	FAU Arena (1,186); Boca Raton, FL
January 29, 2011; 7:00 pm		Western Kentucky	L 53–57	16–7 (8–1)	FAU Arena (2,734); Boca Raton, FL
February 3, 2011; 8:00 pm		at North Texas	W 72–55	17–7 (9–1)	UNT Coliseum (4,352); Denton, TX
February 5, 2011; 8:00 pm		FIU	W 73–72	18–7 (10–1)	FAU Arena (2,961); Boca Raton, FL
February 10, 2011; 9:00 pm		at Denver	L 42–69	18–8 (10–2)	Magness Arena (4,295); Denver, CO
February 12, 2011; 7:00 pm		Louisiana–Lafayette	L 64–72	18–9 (10–3)	FAU Arena (2,143); Boca Raton, FL
February 19, 2011; 7:00 pm		at FIU	W 80–78 ^{OT}	19–9 (11–3)	U.S. Century Bank Arena (1,531); Miami, FL
February 24, 2011; 7:00 pm		Troy	W 77–60	20–9 (12–3)	FAU Arena (1,834); Boca Raton, FL
February 27, 2011; 5:00 pm		at South Alabama	W 74–64	21–9 (13–3)	Mitchell Center (2,042); Mobile, AL
Sun Belt tournament
March 6, 2011; 7:45 pm	(E1)	vs. (W4) North Texas; Sun Belt Quarterfinals	L 64–78	21–10	Hot Springs Convention Center; Hot Springs, AR
NIT
March 15, 2011; 8:00 pm	(7)	at (2) Miami (FL); NIT First Round	L 62–85	21–11	BankUnited Center; Coral Gables, FL
*Non-conference game. ^{#}Rankings from AP Poll. (#) Tournament seedings in parentheses. All times are in Eastern Time.
