= 2010–11 UTEP Miners men's basketball team =

American college basketball season

2010–11 UTEP Miners men's basketball

NIT, First round
- Conference: Conference USA
- Record: 25–10 (11–5 C-USA)
- Head coach: Tim Floyd (1st season)
- Assistant coaches: Phil Johnson; Jason Niblett; William Small
- Home arena: Don Haskins Center

2010–11 Conference USA men's basketball standings
	Conf.				Overall
Team	W		L	PCT	W		L	PCT
UAB	12	–	4	.750	22	–	9	.710
Tulsa	11	–	5	.688	19	–	13	.594
UTEP	11	–	5	.688	25	–	10	.714
Memphis †	10	–	6	.625	25	–	10	.714
Southern Miss	9	–	7	.563	22	–	10	.688
Marshall	9	–	7	.563	22	–	12	.647
SMU	8	–	8	.500	20	–	15	.571
East Carolina	8	–	8	.500	18	–	16	.529
Rice	5	–	11	.313	14	–	18	.438
Houston	4	–	12	.250	12	–	18	.400
Tulane	3	–	13	.188	13	–	17	.433
UCF*	0	–	10	.000	0	–	12	.000
† 2011 CUSA Tournament winner Rankings from AP Poll; *UCF vacated its wins from the 2010–11 season after it was discovered that there was an ineligible player on the team.

The 2010–11 UTEP Miners men's basketball team represented the University of Texas at El Paso in the 2010–11 NCAA Division I men's basketball season. The Miners, led by head coach Tim Floyd, played their home games at the Don Haskins Center in El Paso, Texas, as members of Conference USA. The Miners finished in a tie for 2nd in Conference USA, eventually advancing to the championship game of the Conference USA tournament, where they were defeated by Memphis.

UTEP failed to qualify for the NCAA tournament, but were given an at-large bid to the 2011 NIT. The Miners were eliminated in the first round of the NIT by New Mexico, 69–57.

== Roster ==
2010–11 UTEP Miners men's basketball team
Players
Coaches

Pos.	#	Name	Height	Weight	Year	Hometown
G	2	Tyler Tafoya	6 ft 3 in (1.91 m)	160 lb (73 kg)	So	El Paso, Texas
G	3	Randy Culpepper	6 ft 0 in (1.83 m)	165 lb (75 kg)	Sr	Memphis, Tennessee
G	4	DeShun Watkins	6 ft 4 in (1.93 m)	175 lb (79 kg)	Fr	Chicago, Illinois
G	5	Julyan Stone	6 ft 7 in (2.01 m)	200 lb (91 kg)	Sr	Goleta, California
C	13	Wayne Portalatin	6 ft 10 in (2.08 m)	255 lb (116 kg)	Sr	Allentown, Pennsylvania
G	20	Isaac Gordon	6 ft 5 in (1.96 m)	210 lb (95 kg)	Sr	Los Angeles, California
C	21	John Bohannon	6 ft 10 in (2.08 m)	210 lb (95 kg)	Fr	Lancaster, Texas
F	23	Gabriel McCulley	6 ft 7 in (2.01 m)	225 lb (102 kg)	Jr	Memphis, Tennessee
G	24	Michael Perez	6 ft 3 in (1.91 m)	180 lb (82 kg)	Fr	Tucson, Arizona
F	31	Eric Muñoz	6 ft 7 in (2.01 m)	210 lb (95 kg)	Sr	El Paso, Texas
C	32	Claude Britten	6 ft 11 in (2.11 m)	280 lb (127 kg)	Sr	Baton Rouge, Louisiana
F	33	Michael Haynes	6 ft 6 in (1.98 m)	225 lb (102 kg)	Fr	Chicago, Illinois
F	34	Jeremy Williams	6 ft 7 in (2.01 m)	220 lb (100 kg)	Fr	Memphis, Tennessee
G	40	Tony Baker	6 ft 1 in (1.85 m)	180 lb (82 kg)	Fr	El Paso, Texas
G	41	Christian Polk	6 ft 4 in (1.93 m)	190 lb (86 kg)	Sr	Glendale, Arizona

Head coach

- Tim Floyd (Louisiana Tech)

Assistant coach(es)

- Phil Johnson (East Central)
- William Small (Belhaven)
- Jason Niblett (East Tennessee State)

Legend

- (C) Team captain
- (S) Suspended
- (I) Ineligible
- (W) Walk-on
- Injured
- Current redshirt

Roster
Last update: January 6, 2023

== Schedule and results ==
Date time, TV	Rank^{#}	Opponent^{#}	Result	Record	Site city, state
Exhibition
October 30, 2010*; 7:05 pm		Eastern New Mexico	W 80–76		Don Haskins Center; El Paso, TX
November 5, 2010*; 7:05 pm		Texas A&M–Kingsville	W 75–48		Don Haskins Center; El Paso, TX
Regular season
November 12, 2010*; 7:05 pm		Pacific	L 61–66	0–1	Don Haskins Center (12,222); El Paso, TX
November 14, 2010*; 12:00 pm		Mercer; Legends Classic Regional Round	W 87–74	1–1	Don Haskins Center (2,152); El Paso, TX
November 20, 2010*; 8:30 pm		Western Carolina; Legends Classic Regional Round	W 77–65	2–1	Don Haskins Center (3,489); El Paso, TX
November 23, 2010*; 7:05 pm		New Mexico State; Battle of I-10	W 73–56	3–1	Don Haskins Center (11,792); El Paso, TX
November 26, 2010*; 3:30 pm		vs. Georgia Tech; Legends Classic Semifinal	L 61–71	3–2	Boardwalk Hall (6,273); Atlantic City, NJ
November 27, 2010*; 3:30 pm		vs. Michigan; Legends Classic Consolation Game	W 65–56	4–2	Boardwalk Hall (5,271); Atlantic City, NJ
November 30, 2010*; 7:05 pm		at New Mexico State; Battle of I-10	W 74–72	5–2	Pan American Center (8,488); Las Cruces, NM
December 12, 2010*; 7:05 pm		Arkansas–Pine Bluff	W 77–54	6–2	Don Haskins Center (8,260); El Paso, TX
December 15, 2010*; 7:05 pm		Louisiana–Monroe	W 79–49	7–2	Don Haskins Center (8,208); El Paso, TX
December 18, 2010*; 8:05 pm		Texas Tech	W 82–71	8–2	Don Haskins Center (10,837); El Paso, TX
December 20, 2010*; 8:35 pm		Stephen F. Austin	W 61–52	9–2	Don Haskins Center (7,782); El Paso, TX
December 23, 2010*; 7:05 pm		at BYU	L 68–89	9–3	Marriott Center (13,403); Provo, UT
December 28, 2010*; 7:00 pm		Western New Mexico; Don Haskins Sun Bowl Invitational	W 87–58	10–3	Don Haskins Center (6,010); El Paso, TX
December 29, 2010*; 7:30 pm		Air Force; Don Haskins Sun Bowl Invitational	W 71–54	11–3	Don Haskins Center (7,234); El Paso, TX
January 2, 2011*; 2:00 pm		Sam Houston State	W 74–65	12–3	Don Haskins Center (7,657); El Paso, TX
January 5, 2011; 7:05 pm		Tulsa	W 69–59	13–3 (1–0)	Don Haskins Center (8,671); El Paso, TX
January 8, 2011; 2:00 pm		at UAB	L 97–100 ^{3OT}	13–4 (1–1)	Bartow Arena (6,016); Birmingham, AL
January 12, 2011; 6:00 pm		at Tulane	W 69–58	14–4 (2–1)	Fogelman Arena (2,351); New Orleans, Louisiana
January 15, 2011; 7:05 pm		Rice	W 66–43	15–4 (3–1)	Don Haskins Center (8,761); El Paso, TX
January 22, 2011; 6:00 pm		at Houston	W 57–52	16–4 (4–1)	Hofheinz Pavilion (4,513); Houston, TX
January 26, 2011; 7:05 pm		Tulane	W 69–65	17–4 (5–1)	Don Haskins Center (8,659); El Paso, TX
January 29, 2011; 6:00 pm		at Tulsa	L 68–69	17–5 (5–2)	Reynolds Center (5,412); Tulsa, OK
February 5, 2011; 1:00 pm		at Rice	W 59–53	18–5 (6–2)	Tudor Fieldhouse (2,134); Houston, TX
February 12, 2011; 7:05 pm		SMU	W 67–57	19–5 (7–2)	Don Haskins Center (10,213); El Paso, TX
February 16, 2011; 6:00 pm		at Southern Miss	L 51–64	19–6 (7–3)	Reed Green Coliseum (3,678); Hattiesburg, MS
February 19, 2011; 7:05 pm		Houston	W 76–64	20–6 (8–3)	Don Haskins Center (11,173); El Paso, TX
February 21, 2011; 11:00 am		UCF	L 68–74	20–7 (8–4)	Don Haskins Center (9,824); El Paso, TX
February 23, 2011; 5:00 pm		at East Carolina	L 76–83	20–8 (8–5)	Minges Coliseum (4,329); Greenville, NC
February 26, 2011; 1:00 pm		Memphis	W 74–47	21–8 (9–5)	Don Haskins Center (11,334); El Paso, TX
March 2, 2011; 7:05 pm		Marshall	W 82–74	22–8 (10–5)	Don Haskins Center (10,331); El Paso, TX
March 5, 2011; 1:00 pm		at SMU	W 59–56	23–8 (11–5)	Moody Coliseum (4,076); Dallas, TX
Conference USA Tournament
March 10, 2011; 5:30 pm	(3)	(6) Marshall; Conference USA Quarterfinals	W 77–65	24–8	Don Haskins Center (11,233); El Paso, TX
March 11, 2011; 2:00 pm	(3)	(2) Tulsa; Conference USA Semifinals	W 66–54	25–8	Don Haskins Center (9,496); El Paso, TX
March 12, 2011; 9:30 am	(3)	(4) Memphis; Conference USA Championship	L 66–67	25–9	Don Haskins Center (11,769); El Paso, TX
NIT
March 15, 2011; 7:05 pm	(5)	at (4) New Mexico; NIT First Round	L 57–69	25–10	The Pit (9,626); Albuquerque
*Non-conference game. ^{#}Rankings from AP Poll. (#) Tournament seedings in parentheses. All times are in Mountain Time.
