= 2010–11 Marshall Thundering Herd men's basketball team =

American college basketball season

2010–11 Marshall Thundering Herd men's basketball

CIT, First Round
- Conference: Conference USA
- Record: 22–12 (9–7 C-USA)
- Head coach: Tom Herrion (1st season)
- Assistant coach: Jorge Fernandez; Mark Cline; Dino Presley
- Home arena: Cam Henderson Center

2010–11 Conference USA men's basketball standings
	Conf.				Overall
Team	W		L	PCT	W		L	PCT
UAB	12	–	4	.750	22	–	9	.710
Tulsa	11	–	5	.688	19	–	13	.594
UTEP	11	–	5	.688	25	–	10	.714
Memphis †	10	–	6	.625	25	–	10	.714
Southern Miss	9	–	7	.563	22	–	10	.688
Marshall	9	–	7	.563	22	–	12	.647
SMU	8	–	8	.500	20	–	15	.571
East Carolina	8	–	8	.500	18	–	16	.529
Rice	5	–	11	.313	14	–	18	.438
Houston	4	–	12	.250	12	–	18	.400
Tulane	3	–	13	.188	13	–	17	.433
UCF*	0	–	10	.000	0	–	12	.000
† 2011 CUSA Tournament winner Rankings from AP Poll; *UCF vacated its wins from the 2010–11 season after it was discovered that there was an ineligible player on the team.

The 2010–11 Marshall Thundering Herd men's basketball team represented Marshall University during the 2010–11 NCAA Division I men's basketball season as a member of Conference USA (C-USA). They played their home games at the Cam Henderson Center and were led by first year head coach Tom Herrion.

== Roster ==
2010–11 Marshall Thundering Herd men's basketball team
Players
Coaches

Pos.	#	Name	Height	Weight	Year	Hometown
F	0	Johnny Thomas	6 ft 6 in (1.98 m)	205 lb (93 kg)	RS Jr	Morehead City, North Carolina
G	3	Damier Pitts	5 ft 10 in (1.78 m)	165 lb (75 kg)	Jr	Charlotte, North Carolina
G	4	Johnny Higgins	6 ft 2 in (1.88 m)	185 lb (84 kg)	Jr	Baltimore, Maryland
F	5	Eladio Espinosa	6 ft 7 in (2.01 m)	220 lb (100 kg)	RS So	Norlina, North Carolina
G/F	10	Dago Pena	6 ft 6 in (1.98 m)	220 lb (100 kg)	Jr	Santo Domingo, Dominican Republic
C	11	Nigel Spikes	6 ft 10 in (2.08 m)	237 lb (108 kg)	RS So	Fort Lauderdale, Florida
F	14	Xavier Humphrey	6 ft 6 in (1.98 m)	200 lb (91 kg)	So	Huntington, West Virginia
G	15	Noah Fischer	6 ft 3 in (1.91 m)	180 lb (82 kg)	So	Ripley, West Virginia
C	21	Orlando Allen	6 ft 10 in (2.08 m)	290 lb (132 kg)	RS Sr	Cincinnati, Ohio
G	23	Shaquille Johnson	6 ft 3 in (1.91 m)	205 lb (93 kg)	Jr	Jacksonville, Florida
G	24	DeAndre Kane	6 ft 4 in (1.93 m)	200 lb (91 kg)	RS Fr	Pittsburgh, Pennsylvania
C	25	Aundra Williams	6 ft 10 in (2.08 m)	250 lb (113 kg)	Jr	Clewiston, Florida
F	30	Tirrell Baines	6 ft 6 in (1.98 m)	220 lb (100 kg)	Sr	Laurens, South Carolina
G	33	Justin Howe	6 ft 4 in (1.93 m)	190 lb (86 kg)	Fr	Parkersburg, West Virginia
C	34	Yous Mbao (redshirt)	7 ft 2 in (2.18 m)	235 lb (107 kg)	So	Rufisque, Senegal

Head coach

- Tom Herrion (Merrimack)

Assistant coach(es)

- Mark Cline (Wake Forest)
- Jorge Fernandez (Stetson)
- Dino Presley (Kutztown)

Legend

- (C) Team captain
- (S) Suspended
- (I) Ineligible
- (W) Walk-on
- Injured
- Current redshirt

== Schedule ==
Date time, TV	Rank^{#}	Opponent^{#}	Result	Record	Site (attendance) city, state
Exhibition
November 4, 2010*; 7:00 pm		Concord	W 112–65		Cam Henderson Center (3,964); Huntington, WV
Regular Season
November 12, 2010*; 7:00 pm		West Virginia Tech	W 92–69	1–0	Cam Henderson Center (5,024); Huntington, WV
November 15, 2010*; 7:00 pm		Glenville	W 93–48	2–0	Cam Henderson Center (4,638); Huntington, WV
November 20, 2010*; 7:00 pm		Chattanooga; Global Sports Challenge	L 68–69	2–1	Cam Henderson Center (4,934); Huntington, WV
November 22, 2010*; 7:00 pm		Jackson State; Global Sports Challenge	W 66–60	3–1	Cam Henderson Center (4,388); Huntington, WV
November 27, 2010*; 1:00 pm		at Louisville; Global Sports Challenge	L 66–80	3–2	KFC Yum! Center (21,262); Louisville, KY
November 29, 2010*; 7:00 pm		FIU; Global Sports Challenge	W 88–79	4–2	Cam Henderson Center (4,674); Huntington, WV
December 4, 2010*; 2:00 pm		at Ohio	W 65–57	5–2	Convocation Center (5,977); Athens, OH
December 7, 2010*; 7:00 pm		James Madison	W 67–63	6–2	Cam Henderson Center (4,735); Huntington, WV
December 15, 2010*; 7:00 pm		at Savannah State	W 56–47	7–2	Tiger Arena (350); Savannah, GA
December 19, 2010*; 7:00 pm		VMI	W 98–70	8–2	Cam Henderson Center (4,819); Huntington, WV
December 22, 2010*; 7:00 pm		at James Madison	L 73–80	8–3	JMU Convocation Center (3,044); Harrisonburg, VA
December 28, 2010*; 7:00 pm		Binghamton	W 85–60	9–3	Cam Henderson Center (5,011); Huntington, WV
January 2, 2011*; 4:00 pm		at St. Bonaventure	W 74–65	10–3	Reilly Center (3,229); Olean, NY
January 5, 2011; 7:00 pm, CSS		at No. 19 UCF	L 58–65	10–4 (0–1)	UCF Arena (9,094); Orlando, FL
January 8, 2011; 7:00 pm		Southern Miss	W 95–65	11–4 (1–1)	Cam Henderson Center (5,603); Huntington, WV
January 10, 2011*; 6:00 pm		Savannah State	W 71–57	12–4	Cam Henderson Center (4,542); Huntington, WV
January 15, 2011; 12:00 pm, CSS		at Memphis	L 61–77	12–5 (1–2)	FedExForum (15,877); Memphis, TN
January 19, 2011*; 8:00 pm, WOWK		vs. No. 21 West Virginia; Chesapeake Energy Capital Classic	W 75–71	13–5	Charleston Civic Center (12,380); Charleston, WV
January 22, 2011; 7:00 pm		East Carolina	L 81–82	13–6 (1–3)	Cam Henderson Center (6,709); Huntington, WV
January 26, 2011; 8:00 pm		at UAB	L 56–60	13–7 (1–4)	Bartow Arena (4,781); Birmingham, AL
January 29, 2011; 7:00 pm		Memphis	W 85–70	14–7 (2–4)	Cam Henderson Center (7,614); Huntington, WV
February 1, 2011; 9:00 pm, CBSCS		at Houston	W 63–62	15–7 (3–4)	Hofheinz Pavilion (3,021); Houston, TX
February 5, 2011; 6:00 pm		at Southern Miss	L 60–67	15–8 (3–5)	Reed Green Coliseum (3,653); Hattiesburg, MS
February 9, 2011; 7:00 pm		at UAB	L 48–64	15–9 (3–6)	Cam Henderson Center (5,174); Huntington, WV
February 12, 2011; 5:00 pm		at East Carolina	W 78–65	16–9 (4–6)	Williams Arena (6,741); Greenville, NC
February 16, 2011; 7:00 pm		Rice	W 72–61	17–9 (5–6)	Cam Henderson Center (5,500); Huntington, WV
February 19, 2011; 8:00 pm		at Tulane	W 79–75 ^{OT}	18–9 (6–6)	Devlin Fieldhouse (1,851); New Orleans, LA
February 23, 2011; 7:00 pm		Tulsa	W 79–61	19–9 (7–6)	Cam Henderson Center (5,613); Huntington, WV
February 26, 2011; 7:00 pm		SMU	W 64–62	20–9 (8–6)	Cam Henderson Center (7,211); Huntington, WV
March 2, 2011; 9:05 pm		at UTEP	L 74–82	20–10 (8–7)	Don Haskins Center (10,331); El Paso, TX
March 5, 2011; 7:00 pm		UCF	W 83–69	21–10 (9–7)	Cam Henderson Center (9,036); Huntington, WV
C-USA Tournament
March 9, 2011; 7:30 pm, CSS	(6)	vs. (11) Houston; First Round	W 97–87	22–10	Don Haskins Center; El Paso, TX
March 10, 2011; 7:30 pm, CBSCS	(6)	at (3) UTEP; Quarterfinals	L 65–77	22–11	Don Haskins Center; El Paso, TX
CIT
March 15, 2011; 7:00 pm		Ohio; First Round	L 64–65	22–12	Cam Henderson Center (4,205); Huntington, WV
*Non-conference game. ^{#}Rankings from AP poll. (#) Tournament seedings in parentheses. All times are in Eastern Time.
