= 2010–11 Arkansas–Little Rock Trojans men's basketball team =

American college basketball season

2010–11 Arkansas–Little Rock Trojans men's basketball
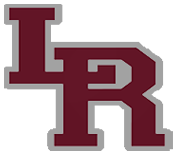

Sun Belt tournament champions

NCAA tournament, First Four
- Conference: Sun Belt Conference
- Record: 19–17 (7–9 Sun Belt)
- Head coach: Steve Shields
- Assistant coaches: Joe Kleine; Charles Cunningham; Joe Golding
- Home arena: Jack Stephens Center

2010–11 Sun Belt Conference men's basketball standings
	Conf.				Overall
Team	W		L	PCT	W		L	PCT
East
Florida Atlantic	13	–	3	.813	21	–	10	.677
Middle Tennessee	10	–	6	.625	16	–	16	.500
Western Kentucky	8	–	8	.500	16	–	16	.500
South Alabama	6	–	10	.375	13	–	16	.448
Troy	6	–	10	.375	8	–	21	.276
FIU	5	–	11	.313	11	–	19	.367
West
Arkansas State	11	–	5	.688	17	–	15	.531
Louisiana–Lafayette	11	–	5	.688	14	–	15	.483
Denver	9	–	7	.563	13	–	17	.433
North Texas	8	–	8	.500	22	–	11	.667
Arkansas–Little Rock †	7	–	9	.438	19	–	17	.528
Louisiana–Monroe	2	–	14	.125	7	–	24	.226
† 2011 Sun Belt Conference tournament winner Rankings from AP Poll

The 2010–11 Arkansas–Little Rock Trojans men's basketball team represented the University of Arkansas at Little Rock during the 2010–11 NCAA Division I men's basketball season. The Trojans, led by 8th year head coach Steve Shields, played their home games at the Jack Stephens Center and are members of the Sun Belt Conference. They finished the season with a record of 19–17, 7–9 in Sun Belt play. They won the 2011 Sun Belt Conference men's basketball tournament to earn an automatic bid in the 2011 NCAA Division I men's basketball tournament. They lost in the new First Four round to UNC Asheville in overtime.

== Roster ==
Number	Name	Position	Height	Weight	Year	Hometown
2	Tramar Sutherland	Guard	6–3	199	Junior	Toronto, Ontario, Canada
5	Marlon Louzeiro	Forward	6–7	241	Sophomore	São Luís, Brazil
10	D'Andre Williams	Guard	5–10	168	Junior	Amarillo, Texas
11	Logan Quinn	Guard	5–10	168	Freshman	Little Rock, Arkansas
12	Courtney Jackson	Forward	6–6	221	Junior	Paris, Texas
13	Chuck Guy	Guard	5–10	164	Freshman	Fort Worth, Texas
20	Matt Mouzy	Guard	6–0	190	Senior	Jonesboro, Arkansas
21	Alex Garcia-Mendoza	Guard	6–3	205	Senior	El Fuerte, Mexico
22	Solomon Bozeman	Guard	6–0	183	Senior	Magnolia, Arkansas
32	Eric Kibi	Forward	6–6	221	Junior	Ottawa, Ontario, Canada
33	Derrick Bails	Forward	6–9	265	Senior	Ripley, Mississippi
40	Montrell Thornton	Forward	6–7	240	Senior	Bowdon, Georgia
55	Guss Leeper	Forward	6–9	229	Freshman	Austin, Texas

== Schedule ==
Date time, TV	Rank^{#}	Opponent^{#}	Result	Record	Site (attendance) city, state
Regular season
November 12, 2010*; 8:00 pm		at SMU	W 57–47	1–0	Moody Coliseum (5,403); Dallas, TX
November 14, 2010*; 1:00 pm		at St. Bonaventure	L 64–77	1–1	Reilly Center (2,809); St. Bonaventure, NY
November 17, 2010*; 7:00 pm		St. Gregory's	W 108–58	2–1	Jack Stephens Center (2,469); Little Rock, AR
November 21, 2010*; 2:00 pm		Illinois State	W 63–54	3–1	Jack Stephens Center (2,532); Little Rock, AR
November 24, 2010*; 7:00 pm, FCS		at Oral Roberts	L 60–86	3–2	Mabee Center (3,402); Tulsa, OK
November 26, 2010*; 7:00 pm		Louisiana Tech	W 74–65	4–2	Jack Stephens Center (2,336); Little Rock, AR
December 1, 2010*; 7:00 pm		at Missouri State	L 46–80	4–3	Jack Stephens Center (6,932); Little Rock, AR
December 5, 2010*; 2:00 pm		Tulsa	W 69–67	5–3	Jack Stephens Center (2,548); Little Rock, AR
December 7, 2010*; 7:00 pm		Philander Smith	W 85–58	6–3	Jack Stephens Center (2,452); Little Rock, AR
December 11, 2010*; 2:00 pm		Ole Miss	L 70–84	6–4	Jack Stephens Center (4,149); Little Rock, AR
December 16, 2010*; 7:00 pm		at Rice	L 55–65	6–5	Tudor Fieldhouse (1,339); Houston, TX
December 21, 2010*; 6:30 pm		vs. Akron; Las Vegas Holiday Classic	L 61–75	6–6	South Point Arena (1,180); Enterprise, NV
December 22, 2010*; 6:30 pm		vs. Oral Roberts; Las Vegas Holiday Classic	W 52–49	7–6	South Point Arena (1,085); Enterprise, NV
December 23, 2010*; 6:30 pm		vs. Stetson; Las Vegas Holiday Classic	W 75–50	8–6	South Point Arena (974); Enterprise, NV
December 30, 2010; 7:00 pm		at North Texas	L 69–81	8–7 (0–1)	UNT Coliseum (3,079); Denton, TX
January 2, 2011; 3:30 pm		at Denver	L 70–72 ^{OT}	8–8 (0–2)	Magness Arena (1,235); Denver, CO
January 5, 2011*; 7:00 pm		St. Bonaventure	L 55–68	8–9	Jack Stephens Center (2,358); Little Rock, AR
January 8, 2011; 7:00 pm		Troy	W 76–73	9–9 (1–2)	Jack Stephens Center (3,744); Little Rock, AR
January 13, 2011; 7:00 pm		Louisiana–Monroe	W 81–50	10–9 (2–2)	Jack Stephens Center (2,528); Little Rock, AR
January 15, 2011; 7:00 pm		Louisiana–Lafayette	W 73–68	11–9 (3–2)	Jack Stephens Center (3,834); Little Rock, AR
January 20, 2011; 6:00 pm		at FIU	W 78–70	12–9 (4–2)	U.S. Century Bank Arena (1,068); Miami, FL
January 22, 2011; 12:00 pm, ESPN2		at Florida Atlantic	L 71–88	12–10 (4–3)	FAU Arena (2,343); Boca Raton, FL
January 29, 2011; 7:00 pm		Arkansas State	L 64–75	12–11 (4–4)	Jack Stephens Center (5,218); Little Rock, AR
February 3, 2011; 7:00 pm		Denver	W 75–72 ^{OT}	13–11 (5–4)	Jack Stephens Center (5,218); Little Rock, AR
February 5, 2011; 7:00 pm		at Louisiana–Lafayette	L 66–67	13–12 (5–5)	Cajundome (4,066); Lafayette, LA
February 12, 2011; 7:00 pm		at Louisiana–Monroe	W 61–53	14–12 (6–5)	Fant–Ewing Coliseum (1,203); Monroe, LA
February 17, 2011; 7:00 pm, FCS		Western Kentucky	L 59–61	14–13 (6–6)	Jack Stephens Center (3,036); Little Rock, AR
February 19, 2011; 3:00 pm, CSS/CST		Middle Tennessee	W 62–58	15–13 (7–6)	Jack Stephens Center (3,410); Little Rock, AR
February 24, 2011; 7:00 pm		at South Alabama	L 79–92	15–14 (7–7)	Mitchell Center (1,811); Mobile, AL
February 26, 2011; 3:00 pm, CSS/CST		Arkansas State	L 63–71	15–15 (7–8)	Convocation Center (5,836); Jonesboro, AR
March 1, 2011; 7:30 pm		North Texas	L 69–72	15–16 (7–9)	Jack Stephens Center (3,055); Little Rock, AR
Sun Belt tournament
March 5, 2011; 9:00 pm	(W5)	vs. No. E4 South Alabama; Sun Belt First Round	W 82–68	16–16	Hot Springs Convention Center (3,992); Hot Springs, AR
March 6, 2011; 8:45 pm	(W5)	vs. (W1) Arkansas State; Sun Belt Quarterfinals	W 59–52	17–16	Summit Arena; Hot Springs, AR
March 7, 2011; 8:30 pm	(W5)	vs. (E2) Middle Tennessee; Sun Belt Semifinals	W 65–56	18–16	Summit Arena (3,348); Hot Springs, AR
March 8, 2011; 6:00 pm, ESPN2	(W5)	vs. (W4) North Texas; Sun Belt Championship Game	W 64–63	19–16	Summit Arena (4,707); Hot Springs, AR
NCAA tournament
March 15, 2011*; 6:30 pm, truTV	(16 SE)	vs. (16 SE) UNC Asheville; NCAA First Four	L 77–81 ^{OT}	19–17	University of Dayton Arena (10,025); Dayton, OH
*Non-conference game. ^{#}Rankings from AP Poll. (#) Tournament seedings in parentheses. SE=NCAA Southeast Regional. All times are in Central Time. Source
