= Glynn Cyprien =

American basketball coach

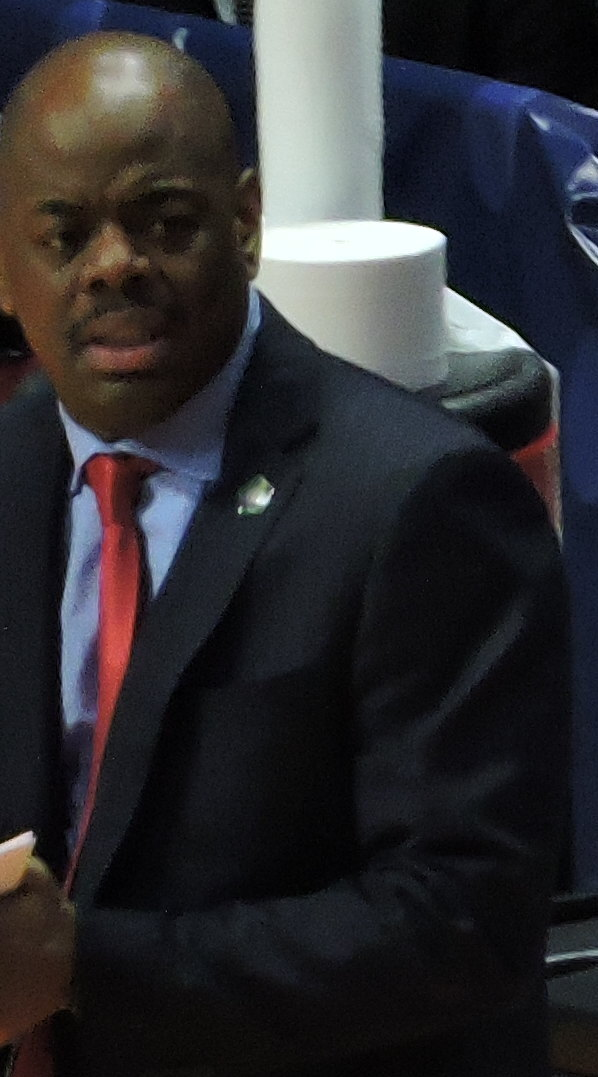
- Cyprien in 2019

Current position
- Title: Associate head coach
- Team: Tarleton State
- Conference: WAC

Biographical details
- Born: September 13, 1966 (age 59); New Orleans, Louisiana, U.S.

Playing career
- 1985–1987: Southern–New Orleans

Coaching career (HC unless noted)
- 1987–1990: UTSA (asst.)
- 1990–1991: Lamar (asst.)
- 1991–1994: Jacksonville (asst.)
- 1994–1995: Western Kentucky (asst.)
- 1995–2000: UNLV (asst.)
- 2000–2004: Oklahoma State (asst.)
- 2005–2006: New Mexico State (asst.)
- 2006–2007: Arkansas (asst.)
- 2007–2009: Kentucky (asst.)
- 2009–2010: Memphis (asst.)
- 2011–2014: Texas A&M (asst.)
- 2017: Iowa Energy
- 2017–2018: Memphis Hustle
- 2018–2019: Texas Tech (asst.)
- 2022–2023: Georgia Southern (asst.)
- 2024–2025: Tarleton State (asst.)
- 2025–present: Tarleton State (assoc. HC)

Glynn Ray Cyprien (born September 13, 1966) is an American basketball coach who is currently an associate head coach at Tarleton State. He was formerly an assistant under Billy Kennedy at Texas A&M University in College Station. He previously assisted Josh Pastner at the University of Memphis, Billy Gillispie at the University of Kentucky, and prior to that was an assistant coach at the University of Arkansas, New Mexico State, Oklahoma State, UNLV, Western Kentucky, and Jacksonville University.

In 2004, Cyprien briefly served as head coach at the University of Louisiana at Lafayette before being fired for falsely claiming to have completed his bachelor's degree at the University of Texas–San Antonio; he had instead completed bachelor's and master's degrees from Lacrosse University, an unaccredited distance learning institution. He has also served as an assistant coach at Lamar and Texas-San Antonio.

On January 9, 2017, Glynn was named head coach of the Grizzlies' NBA Developmental League affiliate, the Iowa Energy. In the 2017–18 season, he continued as head coach with the Grizzlies' new affiliate, the Memphis Hustle.

Cyprien lettered two seasons as a player at Southern University at New Orleans.

He has been a member of the National Association of Basketball Coaches (NABC) for 18 years and the Black Coaches Association (BCA) for 13 years.

Cyprien is married to the former Monique Bouldin. They have two children.
