= 2010–11 East Carolina Pirates men's basketball team =

American college basketball season

2010–11 East Carolina Pirates men's basketball

CIT, First Round
- Conference: Conference USA
- Record: 18–16 (8–8 C-USA)
- Head coach: Jeff Lebo
- Assistant coaches: Tim Craft; Michael Perry; Ken Potosnak
- Home arena: Williams Arena

2010–11 Conference USA men's basketball standings
	Conf.				Overall
Team	W		L	PCT	W		L	PCT
UAB	12	–	4	.750	22	–	9	.710
Tulsa	11	–	5	.688	19	–	13	.594
UTEP	11	–	5	.688	25	–	10	.714
Memphis †	10	–	6	.625	25	–	10	.714
Southern Miss	9	–	7	.563	22	–	10	.688
Marshall	9	–	7	.563	22	–	12	.647
SMU	8	–	8	.500	20	–	15	.571
East Carolina	8	–	8	.500	18	–	16	.529
Rice	5	–	11	.313	14	–	18	.438
Houston	4	–	12	.250	12	–	18	.400
Tulane	3	–	13	.188	13	–	17	.433
UCF*	0	–	10	.000	0	–	12	.000
† 2011 CUSA Tournament winner Rankings from AP Poll; *UCF vacated its wins from the 2010–11 season after it was discovered that there was an ineligible player on the team.

The 2010–2011 East Carolina Pirates men's basketball team represented East Carolina University during the 2010–2011 NCAA Division I basketball season. The Pirates were coached by first year head coach Jeff Lebo, who previously coached at Auburn. The Pirates played their home games at Williams Arena at Minges Coliseum and are members of Conference USA. They finished the season 18–16, 8–8 in C-USA play and lost in the semifinals of the 2011 Conference USA men's basketball tournament to Memphis. They received an invitation to the 2011 CollegeInsider.com Tournament where they lost in the first round to Jacksonville.

== Recruiting ==
College recruiting information
Name	Hometown	School	Height	Weight	Commit date
Robert Sampson; SF	Potomac, MD	Bullis School	6 ft 8 in (2.03 m)	200 lb (91 kg)	May 12, 2010
Robert Sampson; SF	Recruit ratings: Scout: Rivals: (85)				
Tony Smith; SF	Liberal, KS	Seward County Community College	6 ft 4 in (1.93 m)	180 lb (82 kg)	May 1, 2010
Tony Smith; SF	Recruit ratings: Scout: Rivals: (40)				
Overall recruit ranking:
Note: In many cases, Scout, Rivals, 247Sports, On3, and ESPN may conflict in their listings of height and weight.; In these cases, the average was taken. ESPN grades are on a 100-point scale.; Sources: "East Carolina Basketball Commitments". Rivals.; "2009 East Carolina Basketball Commits". Scout.; "ESPN". ESPN.; "Scout.com Team Recruiting Rankings". Scout.; "2010 Team Ranking". Rivals.

== Roster ==
2010–11 East Carolina Pirates men's basketball team
Players
Coaches

Pos.	#	Name	Height	Weight	Year	Hometown
G	0	Miguel Paul (redshirt)	6 ft 1 in (1.85 m)	165 lb (75 kg)	Jr	Winter Haven, Florida
F	1	Darrius Morrow	6 ft 8 in (2.03 m)	255 lb (116 kg)	Jr	Atlanta, Georgia
G	3	Petar Torlak	6 ft 2 in (1.88 m)	185 lb (84 kg)	Fr	Belgrade, Serbia
G	10	Brock Young (injured)	5 ft 11 in (1.8 m)	180 lb (82 kg)	Sr	Raleigh, North Carolina
G	11	Corvonn Gaines	6 ft 4 in (1.93 m)	220 lb (100 kg)	So	Madison, Wisconsin
F	12	Robert Sampson	6 ft 8 in (2.03 m)	195 lb (88 kg)	Fr	Atlanta, Georgia
G/F	21	Jamar Abrams	6 ft 6 in (1.98 m)	205 lb (93 kg)	Sr	Richmond, Virginia
G	23	Erin Straughn	6 ft 6 in (1.98 m)	205 lb (93 kg)	So	Pensacola, Florida
G	24	Jontae Sherrod	6 ft 3 in (1.91 m)	210 lb (95 kg)	Sr	Tarboro, North Carolina
G	30	Wakefield Ellison	6 ft 5 in (1.96 m)	200 lb (91 kg)	So	Asheville, North Carolina
C	33	Chad Wynn	6 ft 10 in (2.08 m)	270 lb (122 kg)	Sr	Atlanta, Georgia
G	34	Evan Salzano	6 ft 0 in (1.83 m)	175 lb (79 kg)	So	Sylva, North Carolina
F/C	35	Darius Morales	6 ft 8 in (2.03 m)	205 lb (93 kg)	RS Fr	Orlando, Florida
F	42	DaQuan Joyner (injured)	6 ft 7 in (2.01 m)	225 lb (102 kg)	RS Jr	Goldsboro, North Carolina

Head coach

- Jeff Lebo (North Carolina)

Assistant coach(es)

- Michael Perry (Richmond)
- Tim Craft (Florida)
- Ken Potosnak (Randolph–Macon)

Legend

- (C) Team captain
- (S) Suspended
- (I) Ineligible
- (W) Walk-on
- Injured
- Current redshirt

Roster
Last update: 17 March 2011

== Schedule ==
Date time, TV	Rank^{#}	Opponent^{#}	Result	Record	Site (attendance) city, state
Exhibition
November 5, 2010*; 7:00 pm		Montreat	W 85–58		Williams Arena at Minges Coliseum; Greenville, NC
Regular Season
November 12, 2010*; 7:30 pm		Erskine	W 74–46	1–0	Williams Arena at Minges Coliseum (4,248); Greenville, NC
November 15, 2010*; 7:00 pm		Campbell	W 76–63	2–0	Williams Arena at Minges Coliseum (3,687); Greenville, NC
November 18, 2010*; 6:00 pm, MASN		vs. NC State; Charleston Classic	L 65–85	2–1	Carolina First Arena (2,639); Charleston, SC
November 19, 2010*; 8:30 pm, MASN		vs. Charlotte; Charleston Classic	L 63–74	2–2	Carolina First Arena (4,120); Charleston, SC
November 21, 2010*; 11:30 am, MASN		vs. USC Upstate; Charleston Classic	W 75–67	3–2	Carolina First Arena (1,793); Charleston, SC
November 24, 2010*; 7:00 pm		Lenoir–Rhyne	W 71–48	4–2	Williams Arena at Minges Coliseum (3,085); Greenville, NC
November 27, 2010*; 5:00 pm		UNC Greensboro	W 81–73	5–2	Williams Arena at Minges Coliseum (3,168); Greenville, NC
December 1, 2010*; 7:00 pm		Charlotte	W 62–61	6–2	Williams Arena at Minges Coliseum (3,904); Greenville, NC
December 4, 2010*; 5:00 pm		Fayetteville State	W 91–70	7–2	Williams Arena at Minges Coliseum (3,893); Greenville, NC
December 7, 2010*; 7:00 pm		Old Dominion	L 68–81	7–3	Williams Arena at Minges Coliseum (4,358); Greenville, NC
December 19, 2010*; 12:30 pm		vs. Coastal Carolina	L 58–59	7–4	Myrtle Beach Convention Center (2,657); Myrtle Beach, SC
December 22, 2010*; 7:00 pm		at George Washington	L 80–82	7–5	Charles E. Smith Athletic Center (832); Washington D.C.
December 29, 2010*; 7:00 pm		at Clemson	L 59–71	7–6	Littlejohn Coliseum (7,382); Clemson, SC
January 3, 2011*; 7:00 pm		at North Carolina Central	W 58–50	8–6	McLendon–McDougald Gymnasium (2,271); Durham, NC
January 8, 2011; 4:00 pm		at No. 21 Memphis	L 58–61	8–7 (0–1)	FedExForum (16,058); Memphis, TN
January 15, 2011; 5:00 pm		Tulane	W 76–67	9–7 (1–1)	Williams Arena at Minges Coliseum (5,211); Greenville, NC
January 17, 2011; 7:00 pm		UAB	L 59–66	9–8 (1–2)	Williams Arena at Minges Coliseum (3,887); Greenville, NC
January 19, 2011; 7:00 pm		at UCF	W 74–62	10–8 (2–2)	UCF Arena (8,044); Orlando, FL
January 22, 2011; 7:00 pm		at Marshall	W 82–81	11–8 (3–2)	Cam Henderson Center (6,709); Huntington, WV
January 26, 2011; 7:00 pm		Southern Miss	L 77–84	11–9 (3–3)	Williams Arena at Minges Coliseum (4,703); Greenville, NC
January 29, 2011; 6:00 pm, CSS		Houston	W 74–70	12–9 (4–3)	Williams Arena at Minges Coliseum (6,308); Greenville, NC
February 2, 2011; 8:00 pm		at SMU	L 41–46	12–10 (4–4)	Moody Coliseum (1,979); Dallas, TX
February 5, 2011; 5:00 pm		UCF	W 68–61	13–10 (5–4)	Williams Arena at Minges Coliseum (6,567); Greenville, NC
February 12, 2011; 5:00 pm		Marshall	L 65–78	13–11 (5–5)	Williams Arena at Minges Coliseum (6,741); Greenville, NC
February 16, 2011; 8:05 pm		at Tulsa	L 67–86	13–12 (5–6)	Reynolds Center (4,897); Tulsa, OK
February 19, 2011; 5:00 pm		at Southern Miss	L 55–72	13–13 (5–7)	Reed Green Coliseum (3,793); Hattiesburg, MS
February 23, 2011; 7:00 pm		UTEP	W 83–76	14–13 (6–7)	Williams Arena at Minges Coliseum (4,329); Greenville, NC
February 26, 2011; 8:00 pm		at Rice	W 71–68	15–13 (7–7)	Tudor Fieldhouse (1,514); Houston, TX
March 2, 2011; 7:00 pm		Memphis	W 68–57	16–13 (8–7)	Williams Arena at Minges Coliseum (5,856); Greenville, NC
March 5, 2011; 8:00 pm		at UAB	L 48–66	16–14 (8–8)	Bartow Arena (7,971); Birmingham, AL
Conference USA Tournament
March 9, 2011; 1:00 pm	(8)	vs. (9) UCF; First Round	W 75–60	17–14	Don Haskins Center (6,841); El Paso, TX
March 10, 2011; 1:00 pm, CBSCS	(8)	vs. (1) UAB; Quarterfinals	W 75–70 ^{OT}	18–14	Don Haskins Center (7,085); El Paso, TX
March 11, 2011; 6:30 pm, CBSCS	(8)	vs. (4) Memphis; Semifinals	L 56–76	18–15	Don Haskins Center (9,496); El Paso, TX
CollegeInsider.com Tournament
March 15, 2011*; 8:00 pm		Jacksonville; CIT First Round	L 66–71 ^{OT}	18–16	Williams Arena at Minges Coliseum (3,108); Greenville, NC
*Non-conference game. ^{#}Rankings from AP Poll.. (#) Tournament seedings in parentheses. All times are in Eastern Standard Time.

== Player Awards ==
- Brock Young – 2010 C-USA Sixth Man of the Year
- Darrius Morrow – 2010 C-USA All Tournament Team
- Jontae Sherrod - 2010 All C-USA Third Team
