= 2010–11 Louisiana–Lafayette Ragin' Cajuns men's basketball team =

American college basketball season

2010–11 Louisiana–Lafayette Ragin' Cajuns men's basketball
- Conference: Sun Belt Conference
- West Division
- Record: 14–15 (11–5 Sun Belt)
- Head coach: Bob Marlin (1st season)
- Assistant coaches: Neil Hardin; Kevin Johnson; Nikita Johnson; Brock Morris
- Home arena: Cajundome

2010–11 Sun Belt Conference men's basketball standings
	Conf.				Overall
Team	W		L	PCT	W		L	PCT
East
Florida Atlantic	13	–	3	.813	21	–	10	.677
Middle Tennessee	10	–	6	.625	16	–	16	.500
Western Kentucky	8	–	8	.500	16	–	16	.500
South Alabama	6	–	10	.375	13	–	16	.448
Troy	6	–	10	.375	8	–	21	.276
FIU	5	–	11	.313	11	–	19	.367
West
Arkansas State	11	–	5	.688	17	–	15	.531
Louisiana–Lafayette	11	–	5	.688	14	–	15	.483
Denver	9	–	7	.563	13	–	17	.433
North Texas	8	–	8	.500	22	–	11	.667
Arkansas–Little Rock †	7	–	9	.438	19	–	17	.528
Louisiana–Monroe	2	–	14	.125	7	–	24	.226
† 2011 Sun Belt Conference tournament winner Rankings from AP Poll

The 2010–11 Louisiana–Lafayette Ragin' Cajuns men's basketball team represented the University of Louisiana at Lafayette during the 2010–11 NCAA Division I men's basketball season. The Ragin' Cajuns, led by first year head coach Bob Marlin, played their home games at the Cajundome and were members of the West Division of the Sun Belt Conference. They finished the season 14–15, 11–5 in Sun Belt play to finish in second place in the West Division. They lost in the quarterfinals of the Sun Belt Basketball tournament to Western Kentucky. They were not invited to any other post-season tournament.

== Roster ==
2010–11 Louisiana–Lafayette Ragin' Cajuns Men's Basketball Roster
Number	Name	Position	Height	Weight	Year	Hometown
0	Bryant Mbamulu	Forward	6–2	180	Redshirt Freshman	Houston, Texas
1	Josh Brown	Guard	6–4	190	Junior	Ruston, Louisiana
2	Randell Daigle	Guard	5–10	175	Senior	Lafayette, Louisiana
3	Travis Bureau	Guard	6–7	195	Senior	St. Amant, Louisiana
4	Scottie Farrington	Forward	6–7	195	Junior	Nassau, Bahamas
5	J.J. Thomas	Forward	6–5	225	Redshirt Freshman	Opelousas, Louisiana
11	Donovan Williams	Guard	6–0	170	Redshirt Freshman	Cecilia, Louisiana
12	Colby Batiste	Center	6–9	225	Senior	Lafayette, Louisiana
15	David Perez	Guard	6–3	195	Junior	New Iberia, Louisiana
20	Courtney Wallace	Center	6–8	245	Senior	Baton Rouge, Louisiana
21	La'Ryan Gary	Guard/Forward	6–7	220	Senior	Carencro, Louisiana
22	Raymone Andrews	Guard	6–2	180	Sophomore	Hammond, Louisiana
31	Phillip Jones	Guard	6–0	185	Junior	Maurice, Louisiana
33	Matt LeBato	Guard	6–7	175	Redshirt Freshman	Sulphur, Louisiana
44	Javan Mitchell	Center	6–9	255	Sophomore	Greensboro, North Carolina

== Schedule ==
Date time, TV	Rank^{#}	Opponent^{#}	Result	Record	Site city, state
Exhibition
11/09/2010*; 7:05 pm		Montevallo; Exhibition Game	W 70–56		Cajundome; Lafayette, LA
Regular season
11/12/2010*; 7:05 pm		New Mexico State	L 76–92	0–1	Cajundome (3,488); Lafayette, LA
11/15/2010*; 7:15 pm		Louisiana College	W 91–66	1–1	Cajundome (3,568); Lafayette, LA
11/17/2010*; 7:00 pm		at Creighton	L 58–63	1–2	Qwest Center Omaha (14,109); Omaha, NE
11/19/2010*; 7:05 pm		Cleveland State	L 55–60	1–3	Cajundome (3,689); Lafayette, LA
11/23/2010*; 7:00 pm		at Houston	L 65–78	1–4	Hofheinz Pavilion (2,889); Houston, TX
12/01/2010*; 7:00 pm		at McNeese State	L 66–69	1–5	Burton Coliseum (978); Lake Charles, LA
12/04/2010*; 2:00 pm		at Tulane	L 52–63	1–6	Avron B. Fogelman Arena (1,860); New Orleans, LA
12/12/2010*; 2:05 pm		Texas College	L 74–77	1–7	Cajundome (2,208); Lafayette, LA
12/15/2010*; 6:00 pm		at UCF	L 58–79	1–8	UCF Arena (4,338); Orlando, FL
12/19/2010*; 2:15 pm		Lamar	W 68–65	2–8	Cajundome (1,865); Lafayette, LA
12/21/2010*; 8:00 pm		at New Mexico State	L 76–82	2–9	Pan American Center (5,011); Las Cruces, NM
12/30/2010; 8:00 pm		at Denver	L 52–65	2–10 (0-1)	Magness Arena (1,188); Denver, CO
01/01/2011; 4:00 pm		at North Texas	L 63–80	2–11 (0-2)	UNT Coliseum (2,450); Denton, TX
01/06/2011; 7:05 pm		Troy	W 93–91	3–11 (1–2)	Cajundome (2,489); Lafayette, LA
01/08/2011; 7:30 pm		Middle Tennessee	L 91–93	3–12 (1–3)	Cajundome (2,239); Lafayette, LA
01/13/2011; 7:05 pm		at Arkansas State	L 65–74	3–13 (1-4)	Convocation Center (3,272); Jonesboro, AR
01/15/2011; 7:00 pm		at Arkansas–Little Rock	L 68–73	3–14 (1–5)	Jack Stephens Center (3,834); Little Rock, AR
01/19/2011*; 7:05 pm		Centenary	W 94–62	4–14	Cajundome (2,112); Lafayette, LA
01/22/2011; 7:05 pm		Louisiana–Monroe	W 84–75	5–14 (2–5)	Cajundome (5,624); Lafayette, LA
01/27/2011; 7:05 pm		North Texas	W 93–88	6–14 (3–5)	Cajundome (3,079); Lafayette, LA
01/30/2011; 4:05 pm		at South Alabama	W 76–70	7–14 (4–5)	Mitchell Center (1,857); Mobile, AL
02/05/2011; 7:05 pm		Arkansas–Little Rock	W 67–66	8–14 (5–5)	Cajundome (4,066); Lafayette, LA
02/10/2011; 6:00 pm		at FIU	W 72–68	9–14 (6–5)	FIU Arena (1,126); Miami, FL
02/12/2011; 6:00 pm		at Florida Atlantic	W 72–64	10–14 (7–5)	FAU Arena (2,143); Boca Raton, FL
02/17/2011; 7:05 pm		Arkansas State	W 64–61	11–14 (8–5)	Cajundome (5,304); Lafayette, LA
02/19/2011; 7:05 pm		Western Kentucky	W 67–64	12–14 (9–5)	Cajundome (7,071); Lafayette, LA
02/24/2011; 7:15 pm		Denver	W 58–52	13–14 (10–5)	Cajundome (8,066); Lafayette, LA
02/26/2011; 6:00 pm		at Louisiana–Monroe	W 61–46	14–14 (11–5)	Fant–Ewing Coliseum (1,633); Monroe, LA
Sun Belt Tournament
03/06/2011; 6:30 pm	(W2)	vs. (E3) Western Kentucky; Sun Belt Quarterfinals	L 76–81	14–15	Convention Center Court (3,907); Hot Springs, AR
*Non-conference game. ^{#}Rankings from AP Poll. (#) Tournament seedings in parentheses. All times are in Central Time.
