= 2010–11 UAB Blazers men's basketball team =

American college basketball season

2010–11 UAB Blazers men's basketball

Conference USA regular season champions

NCAA tournament, First Four
- Conference: Conference USA
- Record: 22–9 (12–4 C-USA)
- Head coach: Mike Davis
- Assistant coaches: Donnie Marsh; Walt Fuller; Mike Jaskulski
- Home arena: Bartow Arena

2010–11 Conference USA men's basketball standings
	Conf.				Overall
Team	W		L	PCT	W		L	PCT
UAB	12	–	4	.750	22	–	9	.710
Tulsa	11	–	5	.688	19	–	13	.594
UTEP	11	–	5	.688	25	–	10	.714
Memphis †	10	–	6	.625	25	–	10	.714
Southern Miss	9	–	7	.563	22	–	10	.688
Marshall	9	–	7	.563	22	–	12	.647
SMU	8	–	8	.500	20	–	15	.571
East Carolina	8	–	8	.500	18	–	16	.529
Rice	5	–	11	.313	14	–	18	.438
Houston	4	–	12	.250	12	–	18	.400
Tulane	3	–	13	.188	13	–	17	.433
UCF*	0	–	10	.000	0	–	12	.000
† 2011 CUSA Tournament winner Rankings from AP Poll; *UCF vacated its wins from the 2010–11 season after it was discovered that there was an ineligible player on the team.

The 2010–11 UAB Blazers men's basketball team represented the University of Alabama at Birmingham in the 2010–11 NCAA Division I men's basketball season. The Blazers' head coach, Mike Davis, was in his fifth season at UAB. The Blazers, who compete in Conference USA, played their home games at Bartow Arena.

UAB finished the regular season atop the league standings and were subsequently named the 2011 Conference USA Champions. The Blazers were awarded the 1-seed for the 2011 Conference USA men's basketball tournament in El Paso, but lost in their first tournament game. They received an at-large bid to the 2011 NCAA Division I men's basketball tournament, where they lost in the new First Four round to Clemson. UAB finished with a record of 22–9 and 12–4 in Conference USA play.

== Roster ==
#	Name	Height	Weight (lbs.)	Position	Class	Hometown	Previous team(s)
1	Aaron Johnson	5'8"	185	G	Sr.	Chicago, IL, U.S.	Hubbard HS
3	Anthony Criswell	6'9"	230	F	Fr.	Oklahoma City, OK, U.S.	Douglass High School
4	Jamarr Sanders	6'4"	210	G	Sr.	Montgomery, AL, U.S.	Jeff Davis High School; NW Florida CC
5	Robert Williams	6'4"	210	G	Fr.	Greenville, MS, U.S.	Weston High School
10	Karl Moton	5'11"	195	G	So.	Stone Mountain, GA, U.S.	Chamblee HS
21	Beas Hamga	6'11"	230	C	Jr.	Douala, Cameroon	Weatherford (Texas) CC
22	Cameron Moore	6'10"	230	F	Jr.	San Antonio, TX, U.S.	Roosevelt HS
23	Dexter Fields	6'2"	205	G	So.	Orlando, FL, U.S.	Olympia HS
24	Preston Purifoy	6'5"	215	G	Fr.	Conway, AR, U.S.	Conway High School
32	Ovie Soko	6'8"	210	F	So.	London, England, U.K.	Bethel HS
2	Mike Jones	6'1"	185	G	Sr.	Nashville, TN, U.S.	Hunters Lane High School
25	Quincy Taylor	6'0"	185	G	Fr.	Wichita, KS, U.S.	Wichita Collegiate High School
44	Jordan Swing	6'6"	200	F	So.	Birmingham, AL, U.S.	Western Kentucky University

== Schedule ==
- All times are Eastern

Date time, TV	Rank^{#}	Opponent^{#}	Result	Record	Site (attendance) city, state
Exhibition
11/5/2010; 8:00pm		West Alabama	W 81–64		Bartow Arena; Birmingham, AL
Regular season
11/13/2010*; 8:00pm		Southeast Missouri State	W 78–56	1–0	Bartow Arena (2,787); Birmingham, AL
11/17/2010*; 8:00pm		at Middle Tennessee	W 76–71	2–0	Murphy Center (4,028); Murfreesboro, TN
11/20/2010*; 4:00pm		at Arizona State	L 66–69	2–1	Wells Fargo Arena (8,642); Tempe, AZ
11/23/2010*; 8:00pm		South Alabama	W 82–58	3–1	Bartow Arena (4,104); Birmingham, AL
11/26/2010*; 8:00pm		vs. Arkansas	W 70–65 ^{OT}	4–1	Verizon Arena (8,425); Little Rock, AR
11/29/2010*; 8:00pm		at Troy	W 78–57	5–1	Trojan Arena (1,914); Troy, AL
12/01/2010*; 8:00pm		Jacksonville State	W 59–53	6–1	Bartow Arena (3,717); Birmingham, AL
12/03/2010*; 7:00pm, FSSO		at Georgia	L 64–66	6–2	Stegeman Coliseum (7,253); Athens, GA
12/05/2010*; 8:00pm		Kent State	W 75–59	7–2	Bartow Arena (3,151); Birmingham, AL
12/19/2010*; 8:00pm		Alabama A&M	W 58–40	8–2	Bartow Arena (3,891); Birmingham, AL
12/21/2010*; 8:00pm		VCU	W 68–65	9–2	Bartow Arena (4,344); Birmingham, AL
12/27/2010*; 8:00pm		George Washington	W 79–44	10–2	Bartow Arena (5,091); Birmingham, AL
01/05/2011*; 7:00pm, ESPN2		at No. 1 Duke	L 64–85	10–3	Cameron Indoor Stadium (9,314); Durham, NC
01/08/2011; 4:00pm, CBSCS		UTEP	W 100–97 ^{3OT}	11–3 (1–0)	Bartow Arena (6,016); Birmingham, AL
01/15/2011; 8:05pm		at Tulsa	L 62–78	11–4 (1–1)	Reynolds Center (5,449); Tulsa, OK
01/17/2011; 7:00pm		at East Carolina	W 66–59	12–4 (2–1)	Williams Arena at Minges Coliseum (3,887); Greenville, NC
01/19/2011; 8:00pm		SMU	W 67–53	13–4 (3–1)	Bartow Arena (4,113); Birmingham, AL
01/22/2011; 7:00pm, ESPN2		Memphis; Bartow Classic	L 73–76 ^{OT}	13–5 (3–2)	Bartow Arena (9,119); Birmingham, AL
01/26/2011; 8:00pm		Marshall	W 60–56	14–5 (4–2)	Bartow Arena (4,781); Birmingham, AL
01/29/2011; 7:00pm, CSS		at UCF	W 74–69	15–5 (5–2)	UCF Arena (7,431); Orlando, FL
02/02/2011; 8:00pm		Southern Miss	L 71–75	15–6 (5–3)	Bartow Arena (5,321); Birmingham, AL
02/05/2011; 3:00pm		at Tulane	W 47–39	16–6 (6–3)	Avron B. Fogelman Arena (2,131); New Orleans, LA
02/09/2011; 7:00pm		at Marshall	W 64–48	17–6 (7–3)	Cam Henderson Center (5,174); Huntington, WV
02/12/2011; 8:00pm, CSS		Rice	W 74–68	18–6 (8–3)	Bartow Arena (6,034); Birmingham, AL
02/16/2011; 7:00pm, CBSCS		at Memphis	L 58–62	18–7 (8–4)	FedEx Forum (16,818); Memphis, TN
02/19/2011; 6:00pm, CSS		UCF	W 63–58	19–7 (9–4)	Bartow Arena (7,061); Birmingham, AL
02/26/2011; 6:00pm		at Houston	W 68–55	20–7 (10–4)	Hofheinz Pavilion (3,072); Houston, TX
03/02/2011; 7:00pm, CSS		at Southern Miss	W 67–66	21–7 (11–4)	Reed Green Coliseum (4,395); Hattiesburg, MS
03/05/2011; 8:00pm		East Carolina	W 66–48	22–7 (12–4)	Bartow Arena (7,971); Birmingham, AL
Conference USA Tournament
3/10/2011; 1:00PM, CBSCS		vs. East Carolina; Quarterfinals	L 70–75 ^{OT}	22–8	Don Haskins Center (6,841); El Paso, TX
NCAA Tournament
3/15/2011*; 9:00PM, truTV		vs. Clemson; First Four	L 52–70	22–9	University of Dayton Arena (10,025); Dayton, OH
*Non-conference game. ^{#}Rankings from AP Poll. (#) Tournament seedings in parentheses.

== See also ==
- UAB Blazers men's basketball
- 2010–11 Conference USA men's basketball season
