= 2010–11 SMU Mustangs men's basketball team =

American college basketball season

2010–11 SMU Mustangs men's basketball

CIT, Semifinals
- Conference: Conference USA
- Record: 20–15 (8–8 C-USA)
- Head coach: Matt Doherty (5th season)
- Assistant coaches: Larry Mangino (1st season); Jerry Hobbie (1st season); Reggie Brown (2nd season)
- Home arena: Moody Coliseum

2010–11 Conference USA men's basketball standings
	Conf.				Overall
Team	W		L	PCT	W		L	PCT
UAB	12	–	4	.750	22	–	9	.710
Tulsa	11	–	5	.688	19	–	13	.594
UTEP	11	–	5	.688	25	–	10	.714
Memphis †	10	–	6	.625	25	–	10	.714
Southern Miss	9	–	7	.563	22	–	10	.688
Marshall	9	–	7	.563	22	–	12	.647
SMU	8	–	8	.500	20	–	15	.571
East Carolina	8	–	8	.500	18	–	16	.529
Rice	5	–	11	.313	14	–	18	.438
Houston	4	–	12	.250	12	–	18	.400
Tulane	3	–	13	.188	13	–	17	.433
UCF*	0	–	10	.000	0	–	12	.000
† 2011 CUSA Tournament winner Rankings from AP Poll; *UCF vacated its wins from the 2010–11 season after it was discovered that there was an ineligible player on the team.

The 2010–11 SMU Mustangs men's basketball team represented Southern Methodist University in the 2010–11 NCAA Division I men's basketball season. The Mustangs, led by head coach Matt Doherty, played their home games at Moody Coliseum in Dallas, Texas, as members of Conference USA. The Mustangs finished in a tie for 7th in Conference USA during the regular season, and were eliminated in the first round of the Conference USA tournament by Rice.

SMU failed to qualify for the NCAA tournament, but were invited to the 2011 CIT. The Mustangs won their first three games of the CIT to advance to the semifinals, where they were eliminated by eventual tournament champions Santa Clara, 74–66.

== Roster ==
2010–11 SMU Mustangs men's basketball team
Players
Coaches

Pos.	#	Name	Height	Weight	Year	Hometown
G	0	Rodney Clinkscales	6 ft 1 in (1.85 m)	190 lb (86 kg)	Jr	Zion, Illinois
G	1	Collin Mangrum	6 ft 5 in (1.96 m)	190 lb (86 kg)	Sr	Howe, Texas
G/F	2	Justin Haynes	6 ft 5 in (1.96 m)	192 lb (87 kg)	Jr	Palmdale, California
F	3	Leslee Smith	6 ft 7 in (2.01 m)	245 lb (111 kg)	Fr	Tortola, British Virgin Isles
F	5	Ričmonds Vilde	6 ft 9 in (2.06 m)	230 lb (104 kg)	Fr	Riga, Latvia
G	11	London Giles	6 ft 3 in (1.91 m)	185 lb (84 kg)	Jr	Dallas, Texas
G	12	Jeremiah Samarrippas	5 ft 10 in (1.78 m)	160 lb (73 kg)	Fr	Bartow, Florida
G	13	Aliaksei Patsevich	6 ft 4 in (1.93 m)	180 lb (82 kg)	Jr	Minsk, Belarus
C	14	Tomasz Kwiatkowski	7 ft 1 in (2.16 m)	250 lb (113 kg)	Sr	Bydgoszcz, Poland
G	15	Austin Horn	6 ft 3 in (1.91 m)	170 lb (77 kg)	So	Southlake, Texas
G	22	Mike Walker	6 ft 1 in (1.85 m)	195 lb (88 kg)	Sr	Iowa City, Iowa
F	24	Robert Nyakundi	6 ft 8 in (2.03 m)	220 lb (100 kg)	Jr	Arlington, Texas
G	30	Ryan Harp	6 ft 4 in (1.93 m)	195 lb (88 kg)	Sr	Abilene, Texas
F	31	Shawn Williams	6 ft 7 in (2.01 m)	225 lb (102 kg)	So	Duncanville, Texas
F	42	Papa Dia	6 ft 9 in (2.06 m)	225 lb (102 kg)	Sr	Saint-Louis, Senegal
C	44	Myles Luttman	6 ft 11 in (2.11 m)	230 lb (104 kg)	Sr	Birmingham, England

Head coach

- Matt Doherty (North Carolina)

Assistant coach(es)

- Larry Mangino (Montclair State)
- Jerry Hobbie (Fordham)
- Reggie Brown (UT Arlington)

Legend

- (C) Team captain
- (S) Suspended
- (I) Ineligible
- (W) Walk-on
- Injured
- Current redshirt

Roster
Last update: January 21, 2023

== Schedule and results ==
Date time, TV	Rank^{#}	Opponent^{#}	Result	Record	Site (attendance) city, state
Regular season
November 12, 2010*; 8:00 pm		Arkansas–Little Rock	L 47–57	0–1	Moody Coliseum (5,403); Dallas, TX
November 16, 2010*; 7:00 pm, The Mtn.		at TCU	L 64–84	0–2	Daniel–Meyer Coliseum (3,937); Fort Worth, TX
November 19, 2010*; 3:00 pm		Portland State	W 69–53	1–2	Moody Coliseum (1,296); Dallas, TX
November 20, 2010*; 5:30 pm		UC Riverside	L 69–73 ^{OT}	1–3	Moody Coliseum (1,424); Dallas, TX
November 21, 2010*; 7:00 pm		Lamar	W 102–70	2–3	Moody Coliseum (1,378); Dallas, TX
November 24, 2010*; 7:00 pm		Wayland Baptist	W 65–32	3–3	Moody Coliseum (1,283); Dallas, TX
November 28, 2010*; 2:00 pm		Central Arkansas	W 76–72	4–3	Moody Coliseum (1,247); Dallas, TX
December 1, 2010*; 7:00 pm		at Louisiana Tech	L 64–69	4–4	Thomas Assembly Center (2,191); Ruston, LA
December 4, 2010*; 5:00 pm		Grambling State	W 71–51	5–4	Moody Coliseum (1,257); Dallas, TX
December 18, 2010*; 7:30 pm		at McMurry	W 70–67	6–4	Kimbrell Arena (1,211); Abilene, TX
December 22, 2010*; 7:00 pm		Alabama State	W 49–38	7–4	Moody Coliseum (1,422); Dallas, TX
December 29, 2010*; 7:00 pm		Southeast Missouri State	W 74–56	8–4	Moody Coliseum (1,342); Dallas, TX
January 1, 2011*; 2:00 pm		Dallas Christian	W 82–49	9–4	Moody Coliseum (1,210); Dallas, TX
January 5, 2011*; 7:00 pm		Ole Miss	L 57–75	9–5	Moody Coliseum (1,929); Dallas, TX
January 8, 2011; 1:00 pm		at Tulane	L 70–79	9–6 (0–1)	Avron B. Fogelman Arena (1,610); New Orleans, LA
January 12, 2011; 7:00 pm		Memphis	W 64–58	10–6 (1–1)	Moody Coliseum (2,509); Dallas, TX
January 15, 2011; 2:00 pm		Houston; Rivalry	L 68–70	10–7 (1–2)	Moody Coliseum (1,721); Dallas, TX
January 19, 2011; 7:00 pm		at UAB	L 53–67	10–8 (1–3)	Bartow Arena (4,113); Birmingham, AL
January 22, 2011; 2:00 pm		Southern Miss	W 79–65	11–8 (2–3)	Moody Coliseum (3,354); Dallas, TX
January 26, 2011; 7:00 pm		at Tulsa	W 59–58	12–8 (3–3)	Reynolds Center (4,817); Tulsa, OK
January 29, 2011; 2:00 pm		at Rice	W 63–54	13–8 (4–3)	Tudor Fieldhouse (2,845); Houston, TX
February 2, 2011; 7:00 pm		East Carolina	W 46–41	14–8 (5–3)	Moody Coliseum (1,979); Dallas, TX
February 9, 2011; 7:00 pm		Tulane	W 66–61	15–8 (6–3)	Moody Coliseum (1,600); Dallas, TX
February 12, 2011; 8:00 pm		at UTEP	L 57–67	15–9 (6–4)	Don Haskins Center (10,213); El Paso, TX
February 16, 2011; 7:00 pm		at Houston; Rivalry	W 65–51	16–9 (7–4)	Hofheinz Pavilion (3,025); Houston, TX
February 19, 2011; 2:00 pm		Tulsa	L 66–74	16–10 (7–5)	Moody Coliseum (2,636); Dallas, TX
February 23, 2011; 7:00 pm		Rice	W 76–66 ^{OT}	17–10 (8–5)	Moody Coliseum (1,707); Dallas, TX
February 26, 2011; 6:00 pm		at Marshall	L 62–64	17–11 (8–6)	Cam Henderson Center (7,211); Huntington, WV
March 2, 2011; 6:00 pm		at UCF	L 48–51	17–12 (8–7)	UCF Arena (6,802); Orlando, FL
March 5, 2011; 2:00 pm		UTEP	L 56–59	17–13 (8–8)	Moody Coliseum (4,076); Dallas, TX
Conference USA tournament
March 9, 2011; 9:00 pm	(7)	vs. (10) Rice; C-USA First Round	L 57–58	17–14	Don Haskins Center (6,916); El Paso, TX
CollegeInsider.com tournament
March 16, 2011; 7:00 pm		Oral Roberts; CIT First Round	W 64–57 ^{OT}	18–14	Moody Coliseum (1,090); Dallas, TX
March 19, 2011; 2:00 pm		Jacksonville; CIT Second Round	W 63–62	19–14	Moody Coliseum (894); Dallas, TX
March 21, 2011; 7:00 pm		at Northern Iowa; CIT Quarterfinals	W 57–50	20–14	McLeod Center (3,968); Cedar Falls, IA
March 25, 2011; 7:00 pm		Santa Clara; CIT Semifinals	L 55–72	20–15	Moody Coliseum (2,458); Dallas, TX
*Non-conference game. ^{#}Rankings from AP Poll. (#) Tournament seedings in parentheses. All times are in Central Time.
