= 2010–11 Conference USA men's basketball season =

- League: NCAA Division I
- Sport: Basketball
- Teams: 12
- TV partner: CBS College Sports Network

Regular Season
- 2011 C-USA Champions: UAB
- Season MVP: Aaron Johnson

Tournament
- Champions: Memphis

Basketball seasons
- ← 09–10 11–12 →

2010–11 Conference USA men's basketball standings
	Conf.				Overall
Team	W		L	PCT	W		L	PCT
UAB	12	–	4	.750	22	–	9	.710
Tulsa	11	–	5	.688	19	–	13	.594
UTEP	11	–	5	.688	25	–	10	.714
Memphis †	10	–	6	.625	25	–	10	.714
Southern Miss	9	–	7	.563	22	–	10	.688
Marshall	9	–	7	.563	22	–	12	.647
SMU	8	–	8	.500	20	–	15	.571
East Carolina	8	–	8	.500	18	–	16	.529
Rice	5	–	11	.313	14	–	18	.438
Houston	4	–	12	.250	12	–	18	.400
Tulane	3	–	13	.188	13	–	17	.433
UCF*	0	–	10	.000	0	–	12	.000
† 2011 CUSA Tournament winner Rankings from AP Poll; *UCF vacated its wins from the 2010–11 season after it was discovered that there was an ineligible player on the team.

The 2010–11 Conference USA men's basketball season marks the 16th season of Conference USA basketball.

== Awards & honors ==
=== Conference USA All-Conference teams ===
Award	Recipients
First Team	Randy Culpepper (UTEP); Papa Dia (SMU); Gary Flowers (Southern Miss); Justin Hurtt (Tulsa); Aaron Johnson (UAB); Jamarr Sanders (UAB)
Second Team	Marcus Jordan (UCF); Arsalan Kazemi (Rice); Cameron Moore (UAB); Julyan Stone (UTEP); Kendall Timmons (Tulane)
Third Team	Will Barton (Memphis); Keith Clanton (UCF); DeAndre Kane (Marshall); Robert Nyakundi (SMU); Jontae Sherrod (East Carolina)
