= Steve Shields (basketball) =

American basketball coach (born 1965)

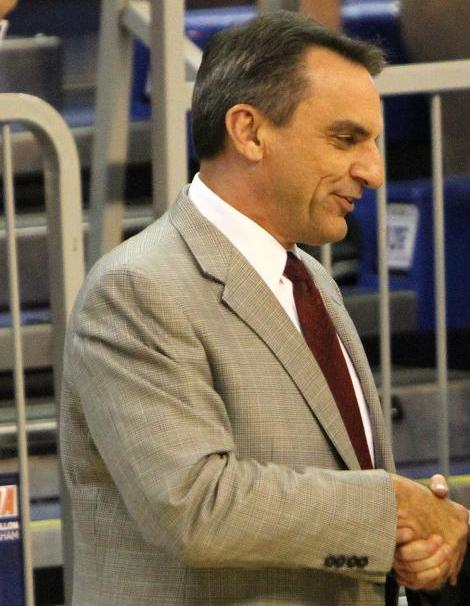

Current position
- Title: Assistant coach
- Team: Tarleton State
- Conference: WAC

Biographical details
- Born: March 9, 1965 (age 61)

Playing career
- ?: McLennan CC; Baylor

Coaching career (HC unless noted)
- 1988–1989: Reicher Catholic HS (asst.)
- 1989–1990: Reicher Catholic HS
- 1990–1993: McLennan CC (asst.)
- 1993–1994: Pensacola JC (asst.)
- 1995–1996: Kilgore CC (asst.)
- 1996–2000: McLennan CC
- 2000–2003: Arkansas–Little Rock (asst.)
- 2003–2015: Arkansas–Little Rock
- 2015–2016: Missouri (special asst.)
- 2016–2017: Missouri (asst.)
- 2017–2018: Southern Miss (asst.)
- 2020–present: Tarleton State (asst.)

Head coaching record
- Overall: 192–178 (.519)
- Tournaments: 0–1 (NCAA Division I)

Accomplishments and honors

Championships
- Sun Belt tournament (2011); Sun Belt regular season (2009)

Awards
- Sun Belt Coach of the Year (2004)

Stephen Leonard Shields (born March 9, 1965) is an American college basketball coach and most recently the head men's basketball coach at the University of Arkansas at Little Rock. He took over as head coach prior to the start of the 2003–04 season.

Shields began his tenure at Arkansas–Little Rock as an assistant to Porter Moser in 2000, and served as his assistant until 2003, when Moser left to take the head coaching position at Illinois State University.

Prior to joining the Trojans' staff, Shields had worked as an assistant for six years at three different community colleges before accepting the head job in 1996 at McLennan Community College, where he had previously spent time as an assistant.

Shields started his collegiate career as a basketball player at Oklahoma City University, where he sat out his freshman year as a redshirt. He transferred and played basketball for one year at McLennan Community College before transferring again to Baylor University. Shields played golf for his father at Baylor, earning all-conference honors. He graduated in 1988 with a degree in education.

On March 18, 2015, Shields was let go by the Arkansas–Little Rock administration after 12 seasons. He left as the winningest coach in the Trojans' history.

== Head coaching record ==
Record table
Season	Team	Overall	Conference	Standing	Postseason
Arkansas–Little Rock Trojans (Sun Belt Conference) (2003–2015)
2003–04	Arkansas–Little Rock	17–12	9–5	1st (East)	
2004–05	Arkansas–Little Rock	18–10	10–4	1st (East)	
2005–06	Arkansas–Little Rock	14–15	5–9	4th (East)	
2006–07	Arkansas–Little Rock	13–17	8–10	5th (West)	
2007–08	Arkansas–Little Rock	20–11	11–7	1st (West)	
2008–09	Arkansas–Little Rock	23–8	15–3	1st (West)	
2009–10	Arkansas–Little Rock	8–22	4–14	6th (West)	
2010–11	Arkansas–Little Rock	19–17	7–9	5th (West)	NCAA Division I First Four
2011–12	Arkansas–Little Rock	15–16	12–4	1st (West)	
2012–13	Arkansas–Little Rock	17–15	11–9	2nd (West)	
2013–14	Arkansas–Little Rock	15–17	9–9	T–5th	
2014–15	Arkansas–Little Rock	13–18	8–12	8th	
Arkansas–Little Rock:		192–178	109–95		
Total:		192–178 (.519)			
National champion Postseason invitational champion Conference regular season champion Conference regular season and conference tournament champion Division regular season champion Division regular season and conference tournament champion Conference tournament champion
