= Josh Pastner =

American basketball player and coach (born 1977)

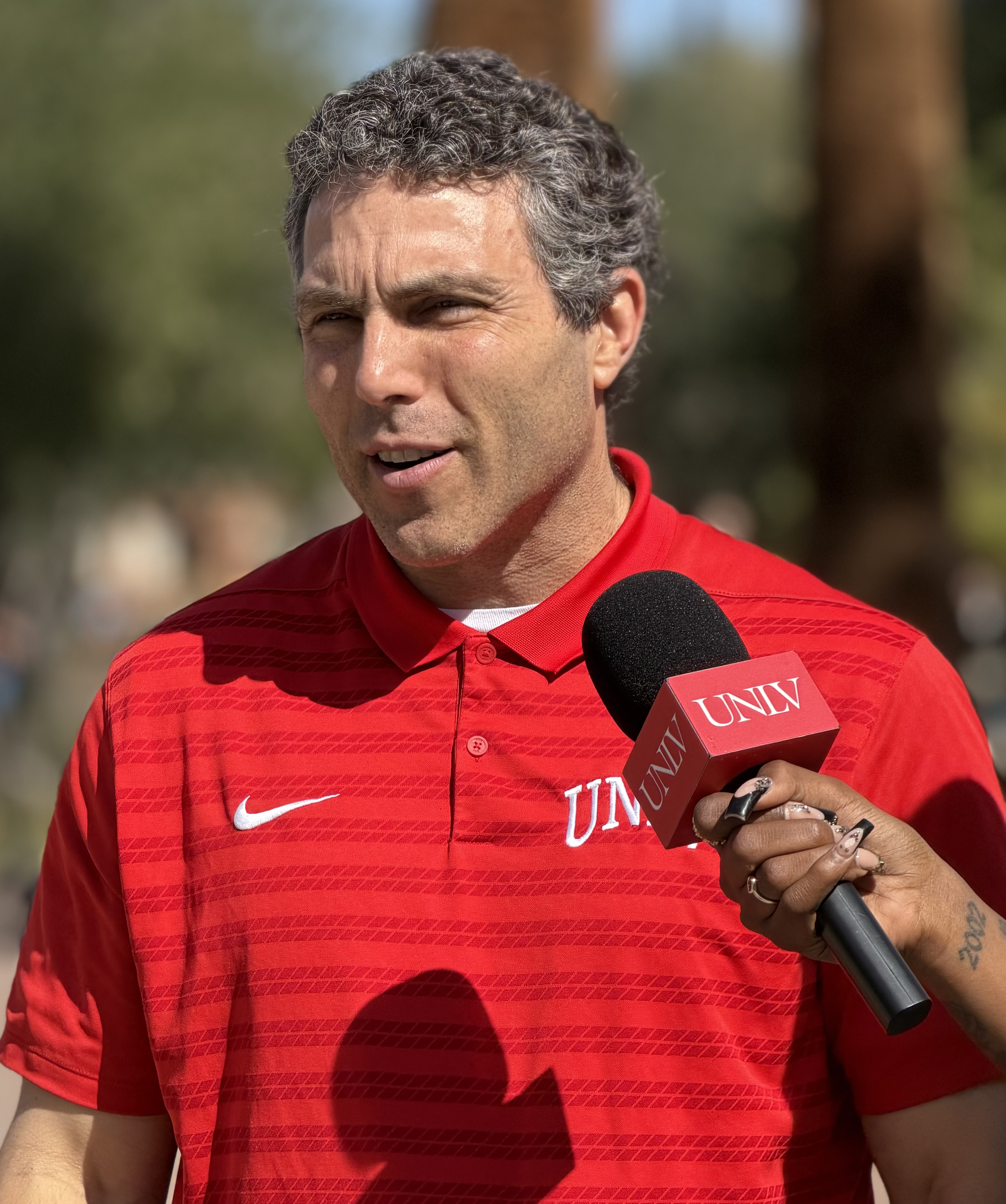
- Pastner in 2026

Current position
- Title: Head coach
- Team: UNLV
- Conference: Mountain West
- Record: 18–17 (.514)

Biographical details
- Born: September 26, 1977 (age 49); Glen Dale, West Virginia, U.S.

Playing career
- 1996–2000: Arizona

Coaching career (HC unless noted)
- 2002–2008: Arizona (assistant)
- 2008–2009: Memphis (assistant)
- 2009–2016: Memphis
- 2016–2023: Georgia Tech
- 2025–present: UNLV

Head coaching record
- Overall: 294–204 (.590)
- Tournaments: 2–5 (NCAA Division I); 6–3 (NIT)

Accomplishments and honors

Championships
- As player: NCAA champion (1997); As coach: 3 C-USA tournament (2011–2013); 2 C-USA regular season (2012, 2013); ACC tournament (2021)

Awards
- C-USA Coach of the Year (2013); ACC Coach of the Year (2017)

Joshua Paul Pastner (born September 26, 1977) is an American college basketball coach who is currently the men's basketball head coach at the University of Nevada, Las Vegas.

Pastner was a player on the 1997 Arizona Wildcats men's basketball national championship team, and an assistant coach at the University of Arizona under Lute Olson and at the University of Memphis under John Calipari. He was named the 2013 Sporting News Conference USA Coach of the Year, and the 2017 Atlantic Coast Conference Men's Basketball Coach of the Year.

== Early and personal life ==
Pastner was born in Glen Dale, West Virginia, in the state's northern panhandle, the son of Marla and Hal Pastner. The family moved to Texas where his father is a high school/AAU coach and basketball promoter in the Houston area. His younger sister, Courtney, played guard in basketball for Kingwood High School, leading the All-Greater Houston Area in scoring her senior season with 23.2 points per game, and was named the 1999 All-Greater Houston Player of the Year, and the 1999 Gatorade "Circle of Champions" Texas High School Player of the Year, the 1999 Texas Girls Coaches Association Player of the Year (TGCA). He grew up in the Kingwood master-planned community of Houston, Texas.

Pastner knew he wanted to be a coach since he was in the 5th grade. By the age of 13 he was publishing the Josh Pastner Scouting Report of local high school talent in the Houston area. At the age of 16, the Houston Hoops AAU summer squad was turned over to Pastner by his father, his first job as a head coach. While an AAU coach, Pastner coached future NBA players such as Emeka Okafor, T. J. Ford and Daniel Gibson.

He married Kerri (née Lamas) in 2009, and has a stepson, Ethan, three daughters, Payten, Kamryn, Harper, and one son, Cason and one sister, Courtney, and one brother, Austin.

== College ==
Pastner attended the University of Arizona, and was a walk-on freshman on its 1997 NCAA championship basketball team. Pastner finished his degree in only two and a half years, taking as many as 33 units per semester. He earned his bachelor's degree in Family Studies from Arizona in December 1998. He finished his master's degree in Teaching and Teacher Education in December 1999, and then began work on his doctorate and started his coaching career in 2000 as a graduate-assistant under Lute Olson at Arizona. He was named Academic All-Pac-10 second team as a senior in 2000. He played for the Wildcats for four years under Olson.

== Coaching career ==
Pastner served as an assistant coach under Lute Olson and Kevin O'Neill at the University of Arizona from 2002 to 2008. Prior to Olson's retirement, Pastner left the University of Arizona to serve as an assistant coach and recruiting coordinator at the University of Memphis during the 2008–09 season for John Calipari. Pastner earned a reputation as a tireless recruiter during his years as an assistant coach.

=== Memphis ===
On April 6, 2009, at 31 years of age, Pastner was selected to be head coach of the University of Memphis Tigers basketball team, succeeding John Calipari. Pastner's first contract with Memphis was for $4.4 million over five years.

Pastner's recruits from the 2010 high school class were ranked as one of the best recruiting classes in the nation. Pastner was named Sporting News Conference USA (C-USA) Coach of the Year for the 2009–10 season.

After a 2010–11 season that included a Conference USA tournament championship and appearance in the 2011 NCAA tournament, Pastner signed a 5-year, $1.7 million (annually) contract extension with the Tigers. After starting his career 0–13 against ranked teams, Pastner coached the Tigers to a 73–68 victory over #5 Oklahoma State on December 1, 2013.

On March 21, 2013, the Tigers defeated Saint Mary's 54–52, giving Pastner his first NCAA tournament victory as a head coach. On the heels of his first NCAA victory and the signing of a top-five recruiting class for 2013, Pastner's contract was extended through 2019–20 and his pay raised to $2.65 million per year. He sometimes neglected his family to devote more time to recruiting. He said: "I was like I love my wife and children, but for the short-term that kid could help me beat Louisville. And my wife and daughter couldn’t. She understood. And so, we got that recruit."

The 2013–14 Tigers entered the season ranked #13 in the country, though the team ultimately earned an 8-seed in the NCAA tournament and lost by 18 points in the Round of 32 to Virginia. The 2014–15 Tigers did not make the NCAA or NIT tournament, the first time in 15 years that the Tigers had missed the postseason. In his first seven seasons coaching, Pastner's teams won 70 percent of their games, going 167-73 and averaging 24 wins a season. He was tied for the 10th-most wins for a head coach in his first seven seasons in NCAA Division I basketball history, and had the second-most victories of any active coach under the age of 40 in Division I.

=== Georgia Tech ===
On April 8, 2016, Pastner was hired to be the new head coach at Georgia Tech. He became the 14th head basketball coach in the school's history.

During the 2016–17 regular season, Pastner's Jackets knocked off Top 5 North Carolina at home, in his first coached ACC game at Georgia Tech. North Carolina would end up being the eventual National Champion. The Jackets also enjoyed quality wins at Virginia Commonwealth, at home against top-10 Florida State, and top-25 Notre Dame. Further improving throughout the season, Tech knocked off Syracuse and Pittsburgh late in February to finish 8–10 in the ACC. Tech was projected to finish last in the conference and to not win a single conference game in Pastner's first season. Because of the team's remarkable accomplishments, Pastner was named 2017 ACC Coach of the Year. He was also honored by Positive Athlete Georgia as Georgia's "Most Positive Collegiate Coach".

Georgia Tech was selected to the National Invitation Tournament as a #6 seed in the Syracuse bracket. They upset the Indiana Hoosiers at home 75–63 in the First Round. In Second Round, Georgia Tech defeated Belmont. A victory over Ole Miss put Georgia Tech in the NIT Final Four, where they defeated the #8 seed CSU Bakersfield. Georgia Tech played Texas Christian University (TCU) in the NIT Championship Game, but lost 88–56.

Tech and Pastner turned the corner in the 2019–20 season, going 17–14 and finishing 11–9 in conference play. It was Tech's first winning season in ACC play since 2004 and highest finish in the ACC since the 2005 season. Some of the highlights of that season was a win over fifth ranked Louisville at home as well as winning their last six of seven to close out the season. Due to the COVID-19 pandemic, Tech did not participate in the postseason.

Tech continued its momentum into the 2020–21 season. Going 17–9, they beat four ranked teams in the regular season and it was the first back to back winning ACC seasons in Tech history since 1990. Pastner and his 2021 squad won the ACC Tournament, first time since 1993, as they beat #15 Florida State in the Championship game. That win secured Tech's first trip to the NCAA Tournament since 2010. It was also GT's first ACC crown since 1993. The Jackets lost to Loyola Chicago in the first round. Moses Wright was ACC Player of The Year, while Jose Alvarado was ACC Defensive Player of The Year.

The success would not last though as Tech parted ways with Pastner on March 10, 2023 following two disappointing seasons. He finished 109–114 in his seven years coaching the Jackets and was the fifth winningest coach in school history behind only Paul Hewitt, John "Whack" Hyder, Roy Mundorff and Bobby Cremins.

=== UNLV ===
After a two-year hiatus from coaching, Pastner was appointed to succeed Kevin Kruger as head coach at UNLV on March 25, 2025.

== Head coaching record ==
Record table
Season	Team	Overall	Conference	Standing	Postseason
Memphis Tigers (Conference USA) (2009–2013)
2009–10	Memphis	24–10	13–3	2nd	NIT Second Round
2010–11	Memphis	25–10	10–6	4th	NCAA Division I Round of 64
2011–12	Memphis	26–9	13–3	1st	NCAA Division I Round of 64
2012–13	Memphis	31–5	16–0	1st	NCAA Division I Round of 32
Memphis Tigers (American Athletic Conference) (2013–2016)
2013–14	Memphis	24–10	12–6	T–3rd	NCAA Division I Round of 32
2014–15	Memphis	18–14	10–8	T–5th	
2015–16	Memphis	19–15	8–10	7th	
Memphis:		167–73 (.696)	82–36 (.695)		
Georgia Tech Yellow Jackets (Atlantic Coast Conference) (2016–2023)
2016–17	Georgia Tech	21–16	8–10	11th	NIT Runner-up
2017–18	Georgia Tech	13–19	6–12	13th	
2018–19	Georgia Tech	14–18	6–12	10th	
2019–20	Georgia Tech	17–14	11–9	5th	
2020–21	Georgia Tech	17–9	11–6	4th	NCAA Division I Round of 64
2021–22	Georgia Tech	12–20	5–15	14th	
2022–23	Georgia Tech	15–18	6–14	13th	
Georgia Tech:		109–114 (.489)	53–78 (.405)		
UNLV Runnin' Rebels (Mountain West Conference) (2025–present)
2025–26	UNLV	18–17	11–9	T–7th	NIT Second Round
UNLV:		18–17 (.514)	11–9 (.550)		
Total:		294–204 (.590)			
National champion Postseason invitational champion Conference regular season champion Conference regular season and conference tournament champion Division regular season champion Division regular season and conference tournament champion Conference tournament champion

== See also ==
- List of select Jewish basketball players
