= Drew Barham =

American professional basketball player

Personal information
- Born: December 29, 1989 (age 36) Memphis, Tennessee, U.S.
- Listed height: 6 ft 6 in (1.98 m)
- Listed weight: 194 lb (88 kg)

Career information
- High school: Christian Brothers (Memphis, Tennessee)
- College: Memphis (2009–2011); Gonzaga (2012–2014)
- NBA draft: 2014: undrafted
- Playing career: 2014–2019
- Position: Shooting guard

Career history
- 2014–2015: Oita Heat Devils
- 2015–2016: Sluneta Ústí nad Labem
- 2016–2017: Mureș
- 2017: Falco KC Szombathely
- 2017–2018: Maine Red Claws
- 2018–2019: Hamburg Towers

Career highlights
- ProA champion (2019)

Andrew Patrick Barham (born December 29, 1989) is an American professional basketball player who plays guard for the Hamburg Towers of the German ProA League.

== College career ==
Barham was a star basketball player at Christian Brothers High School in Memphis. He originally signed with Southern Illinois out of high school, but decommitted after a coaching change. He considered Butler before deciding to enroll at Memphis of the Conference USA. He said of his experience at Memphis, "It wasn't the overall best experience in a way, but I learned from it and had a great time." Barham participated in the Athletes in Action tour in Europe. He averaged 2.0 points and 1.1 rebounds per game in six minutes of playing time as a sophomore. After his sophomore year he transferred to finish his college basketball career for the Gonzaga Bulldogs of the West Coast Conference. As a senior at Gonzaga, Barham scored 6.3 points per game, shooting 49 percent from the field. He helped the team win the West Coast Conference Championship.

== Professional career ==
On September 14, 2014, Barham signed his first professional contract with the Oita Heat Devils in Japan. In the 2015–16 season, Barham joined the Czech club Sluneta Ústí nad Labem and averaged 14.1 points per game in 41 games. Barham has played professionally in Romania for BC Mureș, and in Hungary for Falco KC Szombathely where his team made it to the championship.

Barham spent the 2017–18 season with the Maine Red Claws of the NBA G League. He averaged 4.9 points and 2.8 rebounds per game, shooting 33 percent on 3-pointers, and made eight starts. Barham competed with Few Good Men in the 2018 The Basketball Tournament. On August 2, 2018, he signed with Hamburg Towers of the German ProA League.

== The Basketball Tournament ==
Drew Barham played for Team A Few Good Men in the 2018 edition of The Basketball Tournament. In two games, he averaged six points per game, 3.5 rebounds per game and two assists per game. A Few Good Men made it to the Second Round before falling to Team Gael Force.
