= 2010–11 NCAA Division I men's basketball season =

American collegiate athletics season

- Preseason AP No. 1: Duke Blue Devils
- Regular season: November 8, 2010 - March 13, 2011
- NCAA Tournament: 2011
- Tournament dates: March 15 – April 4, 2011
- National Championship: Reliant Stadium; Houston, Texas
- NCAA Champions: Connecticut Huskies
- Other champions: Wichita State Shockers (NIT), Oregon Ducks (CBI), Santa Clara Broncos (CIT)
- Player of the Year (Naismith, Wooden): Jimmer Fredette, BYU Cougars

The 2010–11 NCAA Division I men's basketball season began on November 8, 2010, with the preliminary games of the 2010 Coaches vs. Cancer Classic, and ended with the 2011 NCAA Division I men's basketball tournament's championship game on April 4, 2011, at Reliant Stadium in Houston, Texas. The tournament's first-round games occurred March 15–16, 2011, in Dayton, Ohio, followed by second and third rounds Thursday through Sunday, March 17–20. Regional games were played March 24–27, with the Final Four on April 2 and the national championship game on April 4.

== Season headlines ==
- Butler became the first program outside of one of the six "power conferences" to go to back-to-back Final Fours since UNLV in 1990 and 1991.
- On April 12, 2010, Centenary announced that it will be re-classifying to Division III for all of its sports upon the conclusion of the 2010–11 school year. First year men's basketball coach Adam Walsh led the Gentlemen in their final year as a Division I program. Notable Centenary basketball alumni include Hall of Famer Robert Parish and the 2000–01 NCAA scoring champion Ronnie McCollum.
- On June 4, 2010, legendary college basketball player and coach John Wooden died at the age of 99.
- The NCAA tournament expanded from 65 to 68 teams and the NCAA announced that Dayton, Ohio, would be the site of the "First Four" opening games.
- The AP preseason All-American team was named on November 1. Duke's Kyle Singler was the leading vote-getter with 62 of a possible 65 votes. Joining Singler were Kansas State guard Jacob Pullen (53 votes), BYU guard Jimmer Fredette (49), Purdue center JaJuan Johnson (46) and North Carolina forward Harrison Barnes (17). Barnes became the first freshman in history to be named to the preseason team.
- Michigan State head coach Tom Izzo had to serve a one-game suspension in December for a secondary violation of NCAA recruitment rules. He had hired an associate of a potential recruit to help during a youth basketball camp in June. Also, Tennessee head coach Bruce Pearl was suspended for the first eight conference games and received a $1.5 million salary reduction due to recruiting violations and providing false information during the NCAA investigation.
- On February 22, 2011, Matt Howard of Butler was named Academic All-American of the Year.
- The March 13 airing of the ESPN films documentary The Fab Five, a followup to its 30 for 30 series, sparked national outrage that lead to a series of media exchanges between members of the press, Michigan Wolverines men's basketball players and Duke Blue Devils men's basketball players in forums such as The New York Times, The Wall Street Journal and The Washington Post.

=== Milestones and records ===
- Duke coach Mike Krzyzewski won his 800th game at Duke on November 24, making him the fifth ever coach to reach that milestone at one school.
- Belmont coach Rick Byrd won his 600th game on January 30.
- Jimmer Fredette became the all-time leading scorer in Mountain West Conference history on February 4, 2011. Then, behind his career high 52-point outburst against New Mexico on March 11, he became BYU's all-time leading scorer after surpassing Danny Ainge.
- On February 19, 2011, Morehead State's Kenneth Faried grabbed 12 rebounds, giving him 1,576 for his career, and broke Tim Duncan's modern-era NCAA rebounding record. Duncan's rebounding total of 1,570 had stood since 1997.
- Charles Jenkins of Hofstra surpassed Antoine Agudio as the school's all-time leading scorer. He broke the previous record of 2,286 points on January 29, 2011, in a game against Drexel. Jenkins graduated as the Colonial Athletic Association's second all-time leading scorer behind Navy's David Robinson, whose 2,669 points remain the CAA's most ever.
- Providence's Marshon Brooks set a new Big East regular season record for single-game scoring as he netted 52 points against Notre Dame in a 94–93 loss to the Irish.
- Hofstra guard Charles Jenkins, College of Charleston guard Andrew Goudelock, Duke forward Kyle Singler, UTEP guard Randy Culpepper, BYU guard Jimmer Fredette, Baylor guard LaceDarius Dunn, Boston University forward John Holland, Virginia Tech guard Malcolm Delaney, Appalachian State guard Donald Sims, Seton Hall guard Jeremy Hazell, Penn State guard Talor Battle, Purdue guard E'Twaun Moore, Kansas State guard Jacob Pullen, Richmond guard Kevin Anderson, Nicholls State forward Anatoly Bose, Lipscomb center Adnan Hodzic, Ole Miss guard Chris Warren, Wofford forward Noah Dahlman Morehead State center Kenneth Faried, and Colorado guard Cory Higgins each passed the 2,000 point mark for their careers.
- After defeating Texas A&M in their next-to-last regular-season game of the year, Kansas clinched at least a share of their seventh straight Big 12 Conference regular season title. It is the most consecutive conference championships from a power conference since John Wooden's UCLA Bruins won 13 straight from 1967–1979.
- Pittsburgh head coach Jamie Dixon set the Division I record for most wins in a coach's first eight seasons after defeating South Florida on March 2. It was his 214th career win.
- Butler set a Horizon League record with their fifth straight conference championship, shared or outright, breaking the previous record of four consecutive regular season championships, also set by Butler from 2000 to 2003.
- Xavier won their fifth straight conference championship, shared or outright, which matched the Atlantic 10 Conference record.
- Over the course of the 2010–11 Ivy League season, Harvard became the final member of the Ivy League to win at least a share of one men's basketball regular season championship since the league was formed during the 1956–57 season.
- Saint Joseph's coach Phil Martelli won his 300th game on March 11. It happened after a 93–90 overtime win against Duquesne in the quarterfinals of the Atlantic 10 Conference tournament.
- Ohio State guard David Lighty broke the all-time career games played record on March 12. The fifth-year senior appeared in his 153rd game, breaking the previous record of 152 set by Deon Thompson in 2009–10.
- Duke's Kyle Singler and Morehead State's Kenneth Faried each eclipsed the dual 2000 points and 1000 rebounds thresholds, joining an exclusive list of NCAA Division I players to accomplish both feats.

== New arenas ==
- Auburn moved from one on-campus venue to another, leaving behind their home since 1969, Beard–Eaves–Memorial Coliseum, for the new Auburn Arena. The Tigers' first game at their new home was a 79–66 win in a preseason exhibition against Division II West Alabama on November 3, 2010. The first regular-season game was a 70–69 overtime loss to UNC Asheville on November 13, 2010.
- Louisville moved from Freedom Hall at the Kentucky Exposition Center, their home since 1956, to the KFC Yum! Center in downtown Louisville. The Cardinals' first game at their new home was an 83–66 win in a preseason exhibition against then-Division II Northern Kentucky on October 31, 2010. The first regular-season game was an 88–73 win over Butler on November 16, 2010.
- Oregon opened Matthew Knight Arena, the replacement for venerable McArthur Court, on January 13, 2011. The Ducks defeated USC, 68–62.

== Season outlook ==
=== Pre-season polls ===
The top 25 from the AP and ESPN/USA Today Coaches Polls, October 28, 2010.

Associated Press
Ranking	Team
1	Duke (55)
2	Michigan State (8)
3	Kansas State (2)
4	Ohio State
5	Pittsburgh
6	Villanova
7	Kansas
8	North Carolina
9	Florida
10	Syracuse
11	Kentucky
12	Gonzaga
13	Illinois
14	Purdue
15	Missouri
16	Baylor
17	Butler
18	Washington
19	Memphis
20	Georgetown
21	Virginia Tech
22	Temple
23	Tennessee
24	BYU
25	San Diego State

ESPN/USA Today Coaches
Ranking	Team
1	Duke (29)
2	Michigan State (2)
3	Kansas State
4	Pittsburgh
5	Ohio State
6	Villanova
7	Kansas
8	Purdue
9	North Carolina
10	Kentucky
11	Florida
12	Gonzaga
13	Syracuse
14	Baylor
15	Missouri
16	Illinois
17	Washington
18	Butler
19	Memphis
20	Tennessee
21	Georgetown
22	Temple
23	Virginia Tech
24	Wisconsin
25	Texas

== Conference membership changes ==
These schools joined new conferences for the 2010–11 season.

School	Former conference	New conference
New Orleans Privateers	Sun Belt	NCAA Division I independent
Winston-Salem State Rams	NCAA Division I independent	Central Intercollegiate Athletic Association (NCAA Division II)

== Regular season ==
A number of early-season tournaments marked the beginning of the college basketball season.

=== Early-season tournaments ===
Name	Dates	Num. teams	Champions
NIT Season Tip-Off	Nov. 15–26	16	Tennessee
Coaches vs. Cancer Classic	Nov. 8–19	4*	Pittsburgh
Charleston Classic	Nov. 18-21	8	Georgetown
Puerto Rico Tip-Off	Nov. 18–21	8	Minnesota
Paradise Jam tournament	Nov. 19–22	8	Old Dominion
CBE Classic	Nov. 12–23	4*	Duke
Maui Invitational Tournament	Nov. 22–24	8	Connecticut
Cancún Challenge	Nov. 18–24	4*	Missouri
Great Alaska Shootout	Nov. 24–27	8	St. John's
76 Classic	Nov. 25–28	8	UNLV
Old Spice Classic	Nov. 25–28	8	Notre Dame
Las Vegas Invitational	Nov. 15–27	4*	Kansas
Legends Classic	Nov. 14–27	4*	Syracuse
South Padre Island Invitational	Nov. 26–28	8	BYU
Diamond Head Classic	Dec. 22–25	8	Butler

*Although these tournaments included more teams, only four played for the championship.

=== Conferences ===
==== Conference winners and tournaments ====
Thirty-one conference seasons concluded with a single-elimination tournament. The teams in each conference that won their regular-season titles were given the number one seed in their respective conference tournaments. Conference tournament winners received an automatic bid to the 2011 NCAA Division I men's basketball tournament except for the winner of the Great West Conference tournament, although Great West Tournament champion North Dakota received an automatic bid to the 2011 CollegeInsider.com Tournament. The Ivy League was the only NCAA Division I conference that did not hold a conference tournament, instead sending its regular-season champion to the NCAA tournament.

Conference	Regular season winner	Conference player of the year	Conference tournament	Tournament venue (City)	Tournament Winner
America East Conference	Vermont	John Holland, Boston University	2011 America East men's basketball tournament	Chase Family Arena (Hartford, Connecticut); Final at campus site	Boston University
Atlantic 10 Conference	Xavier	Tu Holloway, Xavier	2011 Atlantic 10 men's basketball tournament	Boardwalk Hall (Atlantic City, New Jersey)	Richmond
Atlantic Coast Conference	North Carolina	Nolan Smith, Duke	2011 ACC men's basketball tournament	Greensboro Coliseum (Greensboro, North Carolina)	Duke
Atlantic Sun Conference	Belmont	Mike Smith, East Tennessee State	2011 Atlantic Sun men's basketball tournament	University Center (Macon, Georgia)	Belmont
Big 12 Conference	Kansas	Marcus Morris, Kansas	2011 Big 12 men's basketball tournament	Sprint Center (Kansas City, Missouri)	Kansas
Big East Conference	Pittsburgh	Ben Hansbrough, Notre Dame	2011 Big East men's basketball tournament	Madison Square Garden (New York City, New York)	Connecticut
Big Sky Conference	Northern Colorado	Devon Beitzel, Northern Colorado	2011 Big Sky men's basketball tournament	Butler–Hancock Sports Pavilion (Greeley, Colorado); First round at campus sites	Northern Colorado
Big South Conference	Coastal Carolina	Jesse Sanders, Liberty	2011 Big South Conference men's basketball tournament	Campus Sites	UNC Asheville
Big Ten Conference	Ohio State	JaJuan Johnson, Purdue	2011 Big Ten Conference men's basketball tournament	Conseco Fieldhouse (Indianapolis, Indiana)	Ohio State
Big West Conference	Long Beach State	Casper Ware, Long Beach State	2011 Big West Conference men's basketball tournament	Honda Center (Anaheim, California)	UC Santa Barbara
Colonial Athletic Association	George Mason	Charles Jenkins, Hofstra	2011 CAA men's basketball tournament	Richmond Coliseum (Richmond, Virginia)	Old Dominion
Conference USA	UAB	Aaron Johnson, UAB	2011 Conference USA men's basketball tournament	Don Haskins Center (El Paso, Texas)	Memphis
Great West Conference	Utah Valley	Isiah Williams, Utah Valley	2011 Great West Conference men's basketball tournament	UCCU Center (Orem, Utah)	North Dakota
Horizon League	Milwaukee, Butler & Cleveland State	Norris Cole, Cleveland State	2011 Horizon League men's basketball tournament	U.S. Cellular Arena (Milwaukee, Wisconsin); First round at campus sites	Butler
Ivy League	Harvard & Princeton	Keith Wright, Harvard	No Tournament - Princeton won a one-game playoff, receiving the Ivy's automatic NCAA bid.		
Metro Atlantic Athletic Conference	Fairfield	Ryan Rossiter, Siena	2011 MAAC men's basketball tournament	Webster Bank Arena (Bridgeport, Connecticut)	Saint Peter's
Mid-American Conference	Kent State (East); Western Michigan (West)	Justin Greene, Kent State	2011 MAC men's basketball tournament	Quicken Loans Arena (Cleveland, Ohio)	Akron
Mid-Eastern Athletic Conference	Bethune-Cookman	C. J. Reed, Bethune-Cookman	2011 MEAC men's basketball tournament	Lawrence Joel Veterans Memorial Coliseum (Winston-Salem, North Carolina)	Hampton
Missouri Valley Conference	Missouri State	Kyle Weems, Missouri State	2011 Missouri Valley Conference men's basketball tournament	Scottrade Center (St. Louis, Missouri)	Indiana State
Mountain West Conference	BYU & San Diego State	Jimmer Fredette, BYU	2011 Mountain West Conference men's basketball tournament	Thomas & Mack Center (Paradise, Nevada)	San Diego St.
Northeast Conference	Long Island	Ken Horton, Central Connecticut State	2011 Northeast Conference men's basketball tournament	Campus Sites	Long Island
Ohio Valley Conference	Murray State	Kenneth Faried, Morehead State	2011 Ohio Valley Conference men's basketball tournament	Nashville Municipal Auditorium (Nashville, Tennessee)	Morehead State
Pacific-10 Conference	Arizona	Derrick Williams, Arizona	2011 Pacific-10 Conference men's basketball tournament	Staples Center (Los Angeles, California)	Washington
Patriot League	Bucknell	Mike Muscala, Bucknell	2011 Patriot League men's basketball tournament	Campus Sites	Bucknell
Southeastern Conference	Florida (East); Alabama (West)	Chandler Parsons, Florida	2011 SEC men's basketball tournament	Georgia Dome (Atlanta, Georgia)	Kentucky
Southern Conference	Charleston & Wofford (South); Western Carolina & Chattanooga (North)	Andrew Goudelock, College of Charleston	2011 Southern Conference men's basketball tournament	McKenzie Arena (Chattanooga, Tennessee)	Wofford
Southland Conference	McNeese State (East); Sam Houston State (West)	Gilberto Clavell, Sam Houston State	2011 Southland Conference men's basketball tournament	Leonard E. Merrell Center (Katy, Texas)	Texas-San Antonio
Southwestern Athletic Conference	Texas Southern	Travele Jones, Texas Southern	2011 SWAC men's basketball tournament	Garland Special Events Center (Garland, Texas)	Alabama State
The Summit League	Oakland	Keith Benson, Oakland	2011 The Summit League men's basketball tournament	Sioux Falls Arena (Sioux Falls, South Dakota)	Oakland
Sun Belt Conference	Florida Atlantic (East); Arkansas State & Louisiana–Lafayette (West)	Solomon Bozeman, Arkansas-Little Rock	2011 Sun Belt Conference men's basketball tournament	Summit Arena (Hot Springs, Arkansas)	Arkansas-Little Rock
West Coast Conference	Saint Mary's & Gonzaga	Mickey McConnell, Saint Mary's	2011 West Coast Conference men's basketball tournament	Orleans Arena (Paradise, Nevada)	Gonzaga
Western Athletic Conference	Utah State	Tai Wesley, Utah State	2011 WAC men's basketball tournament	Orleans Arena (Paradise, Nevada)	Utah State

==== Conference standings ====
2010–11 America East men's basketball standings
	Conf.				Overall
Team	W		L	PCT	W		L	PCT
Vermont	13	–	3	.813	23	–	9	.719
Boston University†	12	–	4	.750	21	–	14	.600
Maine	9	–	7	.563	15	–	15	.500
Albany	9	–	7	.563	16	–	16	.500
Stony Brook	8	–	8	.500	15	–	17	.469
Hartford	7	–	9	.438	11	–	20	.355
New Hampshire	6	–	10	.375	12	–	18	.400
Binghamton	4	–	12	.250	8	–	23	.258
UMBC	4	–	12	.250	5	–	25	.167
† 2011 America East tournament winner As of March 18, 2011; Rankings from AP Poll

2010–11 Atlantic 10 men's basketball standings
	Conf.				Overall
Team	W		L	PCT	W		L	PCT
No. 20 Xavier	15	–	1	.938	24	–	8	.750
Temple	14	–	2	.875	26	–	8	.765
Richmond †	13	–	3	.813	29	–	8	.784
Duquesne	10	–	6	.625	19	–	13	.594
George Washington	10	–	6	.625	17	–	14	.548
Rhode Island	9	–	7	.563	20	–	14	.588
St. Bonaventure	8	–	8	.500	16	–	15	.516
Dayton	7	–	9	.438	22	–	14	.611
UMass	7	–	9	.438	15	–	15	.500
La Salle	6	–	10	.375	15	–	18	.455
Saint Louis	6	–	10	.375	12	–	19	.387
Saint Joseph's	4	–	12	.250	11	–	22	.333
Charlotte	2	–	14	.125	10	–	20	.333
Fordham	1	–	15	.063	7	–	21	.250
† 2011 Atlantic 10 Tournament winner As of March 25, 2011; Rankings from AP Poll

2010–11 ACC men's basketball standings
	Conf.				Overall
Team	W		L	PCT	W		L	PCT
No. 7 North Carolina	14	–	2	.875	29	–	8	.784
No. 3 Duke †	13	–	3	.813	32	–	5	.865
Florida State	11	–	5	.688	23	–	11	.676
Clemson	9	–	7	.563	22	–	12	.647
Boston College	9	–	7	.563	21	–	13	.618
Virginia Tech	9	–	7	.563	22	–	12	.647
Maryland	7	–	9	.438	19	–	14	.576
Virginia	7	–	9	.438	16	–	15	.516
Miami (FL)	6	–	10	.375	21	–	15	.583
NC State	5	–	11	.313	15	–	16	.484
Georgia Tech	5	–	11	.313	13	–	18	.419
Wake Forest	1	–	15	.063	8	–	24	.250
† 2011 ACC tournament winner As of March 27, 2011; Rankings from AP poll

2010–11 Atlantic Sun men's basketball standings
	Conf.				Overall
Team	W		L	PCT	W		L	PCT
† Belmont	19	–	1	.950	30	–	5	.857
East Tennessee State	16	–	4	.800	24	–	12	.667
Jacksonville	13	–	7	.650	20	–	12	.625
Lipscomb	12	–	8	.600	17	–	13	.567
Mercer	11	–	9	.550	15	–	18	.455
North Florida	10	–	10	.500	15	–	19	.441
Florida Gulf Coast	7	–	13	.350	10	–	20	.333
Campbell	6	–	14	.300	12	–	19	.387
Kennesaw State	6	–	14	.300	8	–	23	.258
Stetson	6	–	14	.300	8	–	23	.258
USC Upstate	4	–	16	.200	5	–	25	.167
† 2011 Atlantic Sun Tournament winner Rankings from AP Poll

2010–11 Big East men's basketball standings
	Conf.				Overall
Team	W		L	PCT	W		L	PCT
No. 4 Pittsburgh	15	–	3	.833	28	–	6	.824
No. 5 Notre Dame	14	–	4	.778	27	–	7	.794
*No. 12 Syracuse	12	–	6	.667	27	–	8	.771
No. 14 Louisville	12	–	6	.667	25	–	10	.714
No. 18 St. John's	12	–	6	.667	21	–	12	.636
Cincinnati	11	–	7	.611	26	–	9	.743
No. 22 West Virginia	11	–	7	.611	21	–	12	.636
Georgetown	10	–	8	.556	21	–	11	.656
No. 9 Connecticut†	9	–	9	.500	32	–	9	.780
Villanova	9	–	9	.500	21	–	12	.636
Marquette	9	–	9	.500	22	–	15	.595
Seton Hall	7	–	11	.389	13	–	18	.419
Rutgers	5	–	13	.278	15	–	17	.469
Providence	4	–	14	.222	15	–	17	.469
South Florida	3	–	15	.167	10	–	23	.303
DePaul	1	–	17	.056	7	–	24	.226
† 2011 Big East tournament winner As of April 4, 2011; *Syracuse:: 7 wins vacated due to sanctions against the program; Disputed record: Syracuse–(27–8)(10–6); Rankings from AP Poll

2010–11 Big Sky men's basketball standings
	Conf.				Overall
Team	W		L	PCT	W		L	PCT
Northern Colorado †	13	–	3	.813	21	–	11	.656
Montana	12	–	4	.750	21	–	11	.656
Weber State	11	–	5	.688	18	–	14	.563
Northern Arizona	9	–	7	.563	19	–	13	.594
Montana State	7	–	9	.438	13	–	18	.419
Eastern Washington	7	–	9	.438	10	–	20	.333
Portland State	5	–	11	.313	14	–	16	.467
Idaho State	4	–	12	.250	9	–	20	.310
Sacramento State	4	–	12	.250	7	–	21	.250
† Conference tournament winner

2010–11 Big South men's basketball standings
	Conf.				Overall
Team	W		L	PCT	W		L	PCT
Coastal Carolina	16	–	2	.889	28	–	6	.824
Liberty	13	–	5	.722	19	–	13	.594
† UNC Asheville	11	–	7	.611	20	–	14	.588
VMI	10	–	8	.556	18	–	13	.581
Charleston Southern	9	–	9	.500	16	–	16	.500
Winthrop	9	–	9	.500	13	–	17	.433
High Point	7	–	11	.389	12	–	19	.387
Presbyterian	7	–	11	.389	13	–	18	.419
Gardner-Webb	6	–	12	.333	11	–	21	.344
Radford	2	–	16	.111	5	–	24	.172
† 2011 Big South tournament winner As of March 16, 2011; Rankings from AP Poll

2010–11 Big Ten Conference men's basketball standings
	Conf.				Overall
Team	W		L	PCT	W		L	PCT
No. 1 Ohio State †	16	–	2	.889	34	–	3	.919
No. 13 Purdue	14	–	4	.778	26	–	8	.765
No. 16 Wisconsin	13	–	5	.722	25	–	9	.735
Michigan	9	–	9	.500	21	–	14	.600
Illinois	9	–	9	.500	20	–	14	.588
Penn State	9	–	9	.500	19	–	15	.559
Michigan State	9	–	9	.500	19	–	15	.559
Northwestern	7	–	11	.389	20	–	14	.588
Minnesota	6	–	12	.333	17	–	14	.548
Iowa	4	–	14	.222	11	–	20	.355
Indiana	3	–	15	.167	12	–	20	.375
† 2011 Big Ten tournament winner Rankings from AP poll

2010–11 Big 12 men's basketball standings
	Conf.				Overall
Team	W		L	PCT	W		L	PCT
No. 2 Kansas †	14	–	2	.875	35	–	3	.921
No. 8 Texas	13	–	3	.813	28	–	8	.778
No. 24 Texas A&M	10	–	6	.625	24	–	9	.727
No. 21 Kansas State	10	–	6	.625	23	–	11	.676
Colorado	8	–	8	.500	24	–	14	.632
Missouri	8	–	8	.500	23	–	11	.676
Baylor	7	–	9	.438	18	–	13	.581
Nebraska	7	–	9	.438	19	–	13	.594
Oklahoma State	6	–	10	.375	20	–	14	.588
Oklahoma	5	–	11	.313	14	–	18	.438
Texas Tech	5	–	11	.313	13	–	19	.406
Iowa State	3	–	13	.188	16	–	16	.500
† 2011 Big 12 Tournament winner Rankings from AP poll

2010–11 Big West men's basketball standings
	Conf.				Overall
Team	W		L	PCT	W		L	PCT
Long Beach State	14	–	2	.875	22	–	12	.647
Cal Poly	10	–	6	.625	15	–	15	.500
Cal State Northridge	9	–	7	.563	14	–	18	.438
UC Santa Barbara†	8	–	8	.500	18	–	14	.563
Pacific	8	–	8	.500	16	–	15	.516
Cal State Fullerton	7	–	9	.438	11	–	20	.355
UC Irvine	6	–	10	.375	13	–	19	.406
UC Riverside	6	–	10	.375	12	–	19	.387
UC Davis	4	–	12	.250	10	–	20	.333
† 2011 Big West tournament winner As of March 15, 2012; Rankings from AP Poll

2010–11 CAA men's basketball standings
	Conf.				Overall
Team	W		L	PCT	W		L	PCT
George Mason	16	–	2	.889	27	–	7	.794
Old Dominion †	14	–	4	.778	27	–	7	.794
Hofstra	14	–	4	.778	21	–	12	.636
VCU	12	–	6	.667	28	–	12	.700
Drexel	11	–	7	.611	21	–	10	.677
James Madison	10	–	8	.556	21	–	12	.636
Delaware	8	–	10	.444	14	–	17	.452
UNCW	7	–	11	.389	13	–	18	.419
Georgia State	6	–	12	.333	12	–	19	.387
Northeastern	6	–	12	.333	11	–	20	.355
William & Mary	4	–	14	.222	10	–	22	.313
Towson	0	–	18	.000	4	–	26	.133
† 2011 CAA tournament winner Rankings from AP poll

2010–11 Conference USA men's basketball standings
	Conf.				Overall
Team	W		L	PCT	W		L	PCT
UAB	12	–	4	.750	22	–	9	.710
Tulsa	11	–	5	.688	19	–	13	.594
UTEP	11	–	5	.688	25	–	10	.714
Memphis †	10	–	6	.625	25	–	10	.714
Southern Miss	9	–	7	.563	22	–	10	.688
Marshall	9	–	7	.563	22	–	12	.647
SMU	8	–	8	.500	20	–	15	.571
East Carolina	8	–	8	.500	18	–	16	.529
Rice	5	–	11	.313	14	–	18	.438
Houston	4	–	12	.250	12	–	18	.400
Tulane	3	–	13	.188	13	–	17	.433
UCF*	0	–	10	.000	0	–	12	.000
† 2011 CUSA Tournament winner Rankings from AP Poll; *UCF vacated its wins from the 2010–11 season after it was discovered that there was an ineligible player on the team.

2010–11 Great West Conference men's basketball standings
	Conf.				Overall
Team	W		L	PCT	W		L	PCT
Utah Valley	11	–	1	.917	19	–	11	.633
NJIT	9	–	3	.750	15	–	15	.500
North Dakota †	8	–	4	.667	19	–	15	.559
South Dakota	7	–	5	.583	18	–	15	.545
Chicago State	3	–	9	.250	6	–	26	.188
Texas–Pan American	2	–	10	.167	6	–	25	.194
Houston Baptist	2	–	10	.167	5	–	26	.161
† 2011 Great West tournament winner As of March 16, 2011; Rankings from AP Poll

2010–11 Horizon League men's basketball standings
	Conf.				Overall
Team	W		L	PCT	W		L	PCT
*Milwaukee	13	–	5	.722	19	–	14	.576
† Butler	13	–	5	.722	28	–	10	.737
Cleveland State	13	–	5	.722	27	–	9	.750
Valparaiso	12	–	6	.667	23	–	12	.657
Wright State	10	–	8	.556	19	–	14	.576
Detroit	10	–	8	.556	17	–	16	.515
Green Bay	8	–	10	.444	14	–	18	.438
Loyola (IL)	7	–	11	.389	16	–	15	.516
Youngstown State	2	–	16	.111	9	–	21	.300
UIC	2	–	16	.111	7	–	24	.226
† 2011 Horizon League Tournament winner * Tournament #1 seed As of April 4, 2011; Rankings from Coaches Poll

2010–11 Ivy League men's basketball standings
	Conf.				Overall
Team	W		L	PCT	W		L	PCT
Princeton	12	–	2	.857	25	–	7	.781
Harvard	12	–	2	.857	23	–	7	.767
Yale	8	–	6	.571	15	–	13	.536
Penn	7	–	7	.500	13	–	15	.464
Columbia	6	–	8	.429	15	–	13	.536
Cornell	6	–	8	.429	10	–	18	.357
Brown	4	–	10	.286	11	–	17	.393
Dartmouth	1	–	13	.071	5	–	23	.179
As of March 17, 2011; Rankings from AP Poll

2010–11 MAAC men's basketball standings
	Conf.				Overall
Team	W		L	PCT	W		L	PCT
Fairfield	15	–	3	.833	25	–	8	.758
Iona	13	–	5	.722	25	–	12	.676
Rider	13	–	5	.722	23	–	11	.676
Saint Peter's †	11	–	7	.611	20	–	14	.588
Loyola (MD)	10	–	8	.556	15	–	15	.500
Canisius	9	–	9	.500	15	–	15	.500
Siena	8	–	10	.444	13	–	18	.419
Niagara	5	–	13	.278	9	–	23	.281
Marist	3	–	15	.167	6	–	27	.182
Manhattan	3	–	15	.167	6	–	25	.194
† 2011 MAAC tournament winner Rankings from AP Poll

2010–11 Mid-American Conference men's basketball standings
	Conf.				Overall
Team	W		L	PCT	W		L	PCT
East
Kent State	12	–	4	.750	25	–	12	.676
Miami (OH)	11	–	5	.688	16	–	17	.485
Ohio	9	–	7	.563	19	–	16	.543
Akron †	9	–	7	.563	23	–	13	.639
Bowling Green	8	–	8	.500	14	–	19	.424
Buffalo	8	–	8	.500	20	–	14	.588
West
Western Michigan	11	–	5	.688	21	–	13	.618
Ball State	10	–	6	.625	19	–	13	.594
Central Michigan	7	–	9	.438	10	–	21	.323
Northern Illinois	5	–	11	.313	9	–	21	.300
Eastern Michigan	5	–	11	.313	9	–	22	.290
Toledo	1	–	15	.063	4	–	28	.125
† Conference tournament winner Rankings from AP Poll

2010–11 MEAC men's basketball standings
	Conf.				Overall
Team	W		L	PCT	W		L	PCT
Bethune–Cookman	13	–	3	.813	21	–	13	.618
Hampton †	11	–	5	.688	24	–	9	.727
Coppin State	11	–	5	.688	16	–	14	.533
Morgan State	10	–	6	.625	17	–	14	.548
North Carolina A&T	9	–	7	.563	15	–	17	.469
Norfolk State	8	–	8	.500	12	–	20	.375
Florida A&M	7	–	9	.438	12	–	20	.375
South Carolina State	5	–	11	.313	10	–	22	.313
Delaware State	5	–	11	.313	9	–	21	.300
Maryland Eastern Shore	5	–	11	.313	9	–	22	.290
Howard	4	–	12	.250	6	–	24	.200
† 2011 MEAC tournament winner As of March 19, 2011; Rankings from AP Poll

2010–11 Missouri Valley Conference men's basketball standings
	Conf.				Overall
Team	W		L	PCT	W		L	PCT
Missouri State	15	–	3	.833	26	–	9	.743
Wichita State	14	–	4	.778	29	–	8	.784
Indiana State †	12	–	6	.667	20	–	14	.588
Northern Iowa	10	–	8	.556	20	–	14	.588
Creighton	10	–	8	.556	23	–	16	.590
Evansville	9	–	9	.500	16	–	16	.500
Drake	7	–	11	.389	13	–	18	.419
Southern Illinois	5	–	13	.278	13	–	19	.406
Illinois State	4	–	14	.222	12	–	19	.387
Bradley	4	–	14	.222	12	–	20	.375
† 2011 MVC tournament winner As of April 1, 2011; Rankings from AP Poll

2010–11 Mountain West Conference men's basketball standings
	Conf.				Overall
Team	W		L	PCT	W		L	PCT
No. 6 San Diego St †	14	–	2	.875	34	–	3	.919
No. 12 BYU	14	–	2	.875	32	–	5	.865
UNLV	11	–	5	.688	24	–	9	.727
Colorado State	9	–	7	.563	19	–	13	.594
New Mexico	8	–	8	.500	22	–	13	.629
Air Force	6	–	10	.375	16	–	16	.500
Utah	6	–	10	.375	13	–	18	.419
Wyoming	3	–	13	.188	10	–	21	.323
TCU	1	–	15	.063	11	–	22	.333
† 2011 MWC tournament winner Rankings from AP/Coaches' Poll

2010–11 Northeast Conference men's basketball standings
	Conf.				Overall
Team	W		L	PCT	W		L	PCT
† Long Island	16	–	2	.889	27	–	6	.818
Quinnipiac	13	–	5	.722	22	–	10	.688
Robert Morris	12	–	6	.667	18	–	14	.563
Central Connecticut State	11	–	7	.611	19	–	12	.613
St. Francis (NY)	10	–	8	.556	15	–	15	.500
Wagner	9	–	9	.500	13	–	17	.433
Mount St. Mary's	9	–	9	.500	11	–	21	.344
Bryant*	7	–	11	.389	9	–	21	.300
St. Francis (PA)	7	–	11	.389	9	–	21	.300
Sacred Heart	6	–	12	.333	11	–	18	.379
Monmouth	5	–	13	.278	9	–	21	.300
Fairleigh Dickinson	3	–	15	.167	5	–	24	.172
† 2011 Northeast Conference tournament winner As of March 17, 2012; Rankings from AP Poll; *Ineligible for conference tournament

2010–11 Ohio Valley Conference men's basketball standings
	Conf.				Overall
Team	W		L	PCT	W		L	PCT
Murray State	14	–	4	.778	23	–	9	.719
Morehead State †	13	–	5	.722	25	–	9	.735
Austin Peay	13	–	5	.722	20	–	14	.588
Tennessee Tech	12	–	6	.667	20	–	13	.606
Tennessee State	10	–	8	.556	14	–	16	.467
Eastern Kentucky	9	–	9	.500	15	–	16	.484
UT Martin	6	–	12	.333	12	–	21	.364
Southeast Missouri State	6	–	12	.333	10	–	22	.313
Eastern Illinois	4	–	14	.222	9	–	20	.310
Jacksonville State	3	–	15	.167	5	–	25	.167
SIU Edwardsville*	0	–	0	–	8	–	21	.276
† 2011 OVC tournament winner As of March 17, 2011 * Ineligible (in transition) Rankings from AP Poll

2010–11 Pacific-10 Conference men's basketball standings
	Conf.				Overall
Team	W		L	PCT	W		L	PCT
No. 17 Arizona	14	–	4	.778	30	–	8	.789
UCLA	13	–	5	.722	23	–	11	.676
No. 23 Washington †	11	–	7	.611	24	–	11	.686
USC	10	–	8	.556	19	–	15	.559
California	10	–	8	.556	18	–	15	.545
Washington State	9	–	9	.500	22	–	13	.629
Oregon	7	–	11	.389	21	–	18	.538
Stanford	7	–	11	.389	15	–	16	.484
Oregon State	5	–	13	.278	11	–	20	.355
Arizona State	4	–	14	.222	12	–	19	.387
† Conference tournament winner As of March 30, 2011; Rankings from AP poll

2010–11 Patriot League men's basketball standings
	Conf.				Overall
Team	W		L	PCT	W		L	PCT
Bucknell †	13	–	1	.929	25	–	9	.735
American	11	–	3	.786	22	–	9	.710
Holy Cross	7	–	7	.500	8	–	21	.276
Lehigh	6	–	8	.429	16	–	15	.516
Lafayette	6	–	8	.429	13	–	19	.406
Navy	6	–	8	.429	11	–	20	.355
Colgate	4	–	10	.286	7	–	23	.233
Army	3	–	11	.214	11	–	19	.367
† 2011 Patriot League tournament winner

2010–11 Southeastern Conference men's basketball standings
	Conf.				Overall
Team	W		L	PCT	W		L	PCT
East
No. 15 Florida	13	–	3	.813	29	–	8	.784
No. 11 Kentucky †	10	–	6	.625	29	–	9	.763
No. 25 Vanderbilt	9	–	7	.563	23	–	11	.676
Georgia	9	–	7	.563	21	–	12	.636
Tennessee	8	–	8	.500	19	–	15	.559
South Carolina	5	–	11	.313	14	–	16	.467
West
Alabama	12	–	4	.750	25	–	12	.676
Mississippi State	9	–	7	.563	17	–	14	.548
Ole Miss	7	–	9	.438	20	–	14	.588
Arkansas	7	–	9	.438	18	–	13	.581
Auburn	4	–	12	.250	11	–	20	.355
LSU	3	–	13	.188	11	–	21	.344
† 2011 SEC tournament winner As of April 2, 2011; Rankings from AP Poll

2010–11 Southern Conference men's basketball standings
	Conf.				Overall
Team	W		L	PCT	W		L	PCT
North
Western Carolina	12	–	6	.667	18	–	15	.545
Chattanooga	12	–	6	.667	16	–	16	.500
Appalachian State	10	–	8	.556	16	–	15	.516
Elon	7	–	11	.389	14	–	17	.452
UNC Greensboro	6	–	12	.333	7	–	24	.226
Samford	4	–	14	.222	12	–	19	.387
South
College of Charleston	14	–	4	.778	25	–	10	.714
Wofford†	14	–	4	.778	21	–	13	.618
Furman	12	–	6	.667	22	–	11	.667
Davidson	10	–	8	.556	18	–	15	.545
The Citadel	6	–	12	.333	10	–	22	.313
Georgia Southern	1	–	17	.056	5	–	27	.156
† SoCon Tournament winner As of March 31, 2011; Rankings from AP Poll

2010–11 Southland Conference men's basketball standings
	Conf.				Overall
Team	W		L	PCT	W		L	PCT
East
McNeese State	11	–	5	.688	21	–	12	.636
Northwestern State	10	–	6	.625	18	–	14	.563
Southeastern Louisiana	9	–	7	.563	15	–	14	.517
Nicholls State	8	–	8	.500	14	–	14	.500
Lamar	7	–	9	.438	13	–	17	.433
Central Arkansas	1	–	15	.063	5	–	24	.172
West
Sam Houston State	10	–	6	.625	18	–	13	.581
Texas State	10	–	6	.625	16	–	16	.500
Stephen F. Austin	9	–	7	.563	18	–	11	.621
UTSA †	9	–	7	.563	20	–	14	.588
Texas–Arlington	7	–	9	.438	13	–	16	.448
Texas A&M–Corpus Christi	5	–	11	.313	10	–	21	.323
† 2011 Southland tournament winner As of March 14, 2011; Rankings from AP poll

2010–11 SWAC men's basketball standings
	Conf.				Overall
Team	W		L	PCT	W		L	PCT
Texas Southern	16	–	2	.889	19	–	13	.594
Jackson State	12	–	6	.667	17	–	15	.531
Mississippi Valley State	12	–	6	.667	13	–	19	.406
Alabama State †	11	–	7	.611	17	–	18	.486
Alabama A&M	10	–	8	.556	13	–	15	.464
Grambling State	8	–	10	.444	12	–	21	.364
Prairie View A&M	7	–	11	.389	10	–	22	.313
Arkansas–Pine Bluff	7	–	11	.389	7	–	24	.226
Alcorn State	4	–	14	.222	4	–	24	.143
Southern	3	–	15	.167	4	–	26	.133
† 2011 SWAC tournament winner As of March 13, 2012; Rankings from AP Poll

2010–11 Summit League men's basketball standings
	Conf.				Overall
Team	W		L	PCT	W		L	PCT
Oakland †	17	–	1	.944	25	–	10	.714
Oral Roberts	13	–	5	.722	19	–	16	.543
IUPUI	12	–	6	.667	19	–	14	.576
IPFW	11	–	7	.611	18	–	12	.600
South Dakota State	10	–	8	.556	19	–	12	.613
UMKC	9	–	9	.500	16	–	14	.533
North Dakota State	8	–	10	.444	14	–	15	.483
Southern Utah	7	–	11	.389	11	–	19	.367
Western Illinois	2	–	16	.111	7	–	23	.233
Centenary *	1	–	17	.056	1	–	29	.033
† Conference tournament winner As of March 18, 2011; Rankings from AP Poll * Ineligible for conference tournament

2010–11 Sun Belt Conference men's basketball standings
	Conf.				Overall
Team	W		L	PCT	W		L	PCT
East
Florida Atlantic	13	–	3	.813	21	–	10	.677
Middle Tennessee	10	–	6	.625	16	–	16	.500
Western Kentucky	8	–	8	.500	16	–	16	.500
South Alabama	6	–	10	.375	13	–	16	.448
Troy	6	–	10	.375	8	–	21	.276
FIU	5	–	11	.313	11	–	19	.367
West
Arkansas State	11	–	5	.688	17	–	15	.531
Louisiana–Lafayette	11	–	5	.688	14	–	15	.483
Denver	9	–	7	.563	13	–	17	.433
North Texas	8	–	8	.500	22	–	11	.667
Arkansas–Little Rock †	7	–	9	.438	19	–	17	.528
Louisiana–Monroe	2	–	14	.125	7	–	24	.226
† 2011 Sun Belt Conference tournament winner Rankings from AP Poll

2010–11 West Coast Conference men's basketball standings
	Conf.				Overall
Team	W		L	PCT	W		L	PCT
Saint Mary's	11	–	3	.786	25	–	9	.735
† Gonzaga	11	–	3	.786	25	–	10	.714
San Francisco	10	–	4	.714	19	–	15	.559
Santa Clara	8	–	6	.571	24	–	14	.632
Portland	7	–	7	.500	20	–	12	.625
Pepperdine	5	–	9	.357	12	–	21	.364
Loyola Marymount	2	–	12	.143	11	–	21	.344
San Diego	2	–	12	.143	6	–	24	.200
† 2011 WCC tournament winner As of March 30, 2011; Rankings from AP Poll

2010–11 WAC men's basketball standings
	Conf.				Overall
Team	W		L	PCT	W		L	PCT
No. 19 Utah State †	15	–	1	.938	30	–	4	.882
Boise State	10	–	6	.625	22	–	13	.629
New Mexico State	9	–	7	.563	16	–	17	.485
Idaho	9	–	7	.563	18	–	14	.563
Hawaii	8	–	8	.500	19	–	13	.594
Nevada	8	–	8	.500	13	–	19	.406
Fresno State	6	–	10	.375	14	–	17	.452
San Jose State	5	–	11	.313	17	–	16	.515
Louisiana Tech	2	–	14	.125	12	–	20	.375
† 2011 WAC tournament winner Rankings from AP Poll

=== Division I independents ===
Seven schools played as Division I independents. Antwan Carter of Longwood was named Independent Player of the Year.

2010–11 NCAA Division I men's basketball independents standings
	Conf.				Overall
Team	W		L	PCT	W		L	PCT
New Orleans		–		–	16	–	6	.727
North Carolina Central		–		–	15	–	15	.500
Savannah State		–		–	12	–	18	.400
Longwood		–		–	12	–	19	.387
Seattle		–		–	11	–	20	.355
Cal State Bakersfield		–		–	9	–	19	.321
SIU Edwardsville		–		–	8	–	21	.276
Rankings from AP Poll

=== Informal championships ===
Conference	Regular season winner	Most Valuable Player
Philadelphia Big 5	Villanova	Lavoy Allen, Temple

Villanova finished with a 4–0 record in head-to-head competition among the Philadelphia Big 5.

=== Statistical leaders ===
Source for additional stats categories

Points per game			Rebounds per game			Assists per game			Steals per game		
Player	School	PPG	Player	School	RPG	Player	School	APG	Player	School	SPG
Jimmer Fredette	BYU	28.9	Kenneth Faried	Morehead St.	14.5	Aaron Johnson	UAB	7.7	Anthony Nelson	Niagara	3.4
Marshon Brooks	Providence	24.6	Ryan Rossiter	Siena	13.2	Scott Machado	Iona	7.6	Jay Threatt	Delaware St.	3.1
Adrian Oliver	San Jose St.	24.0	Jordan Williams	Maryland	11.8	D. J. Cooper	Ohio	7.5	Josh Slater	Lipscomb	3.1
Andrew Goudelock	C. of Charleston	23.7	Chris Gaston	Fordham	11.3	Hank Thorns	TCU	7.0	T. J. McConnell	Duquesne	2.8
Kemba Walker	Connecticut	23.5	Kyle O'Quinn	Norfolk St.	11.1	Darius Morris	Michigan	6.7	Jared Cunningham	Oregon St.	2.8

Blocked shots per game			Field-goal percentage			Three-Point FG percentage			Free-throw percentage		
Player	School	BPG	Player	School	FG%	Player	School	3FG%	Player	School	FT%
William Mosley	Northwestern St.	4.9	Leon Powell	SE Missouri St.	63.0	Jon Diebler	Ohio St.	50.2	Chris Warren	Mississippi	92.8
Keith Benson	Oakland	3.6	Brian Qvale	Montana	62.6	Robert Nyakundi	SMU	49.7	Oliver McNally	Harvard	92.6
C. J. Aiken	St. Joseph's	3.5	Kenneth Faried	Morehead St.	62.3	Ashton Gibbs	Pittsburgh	49.0	Zamal Nixon	Houston	92.2
Kyle O'Quinn	Norfolk St.	3.4	Thomas Coleman	NC A&T	61.9	Scott Bamforth	Weber St.	48.8	Brian Barbour	Columbia	91.7
Sam Muldrow	South Carolina	3.4	Noah Dahlman	Wofford	61.2	Gabe Rogers	N. Arizona	46.8	Justin Robinson	Rider	90.7

== Postseason tournaments ==
=== NCAA tournament ===
==== Final Four – Reliant Stadium in Houston, Texas ====
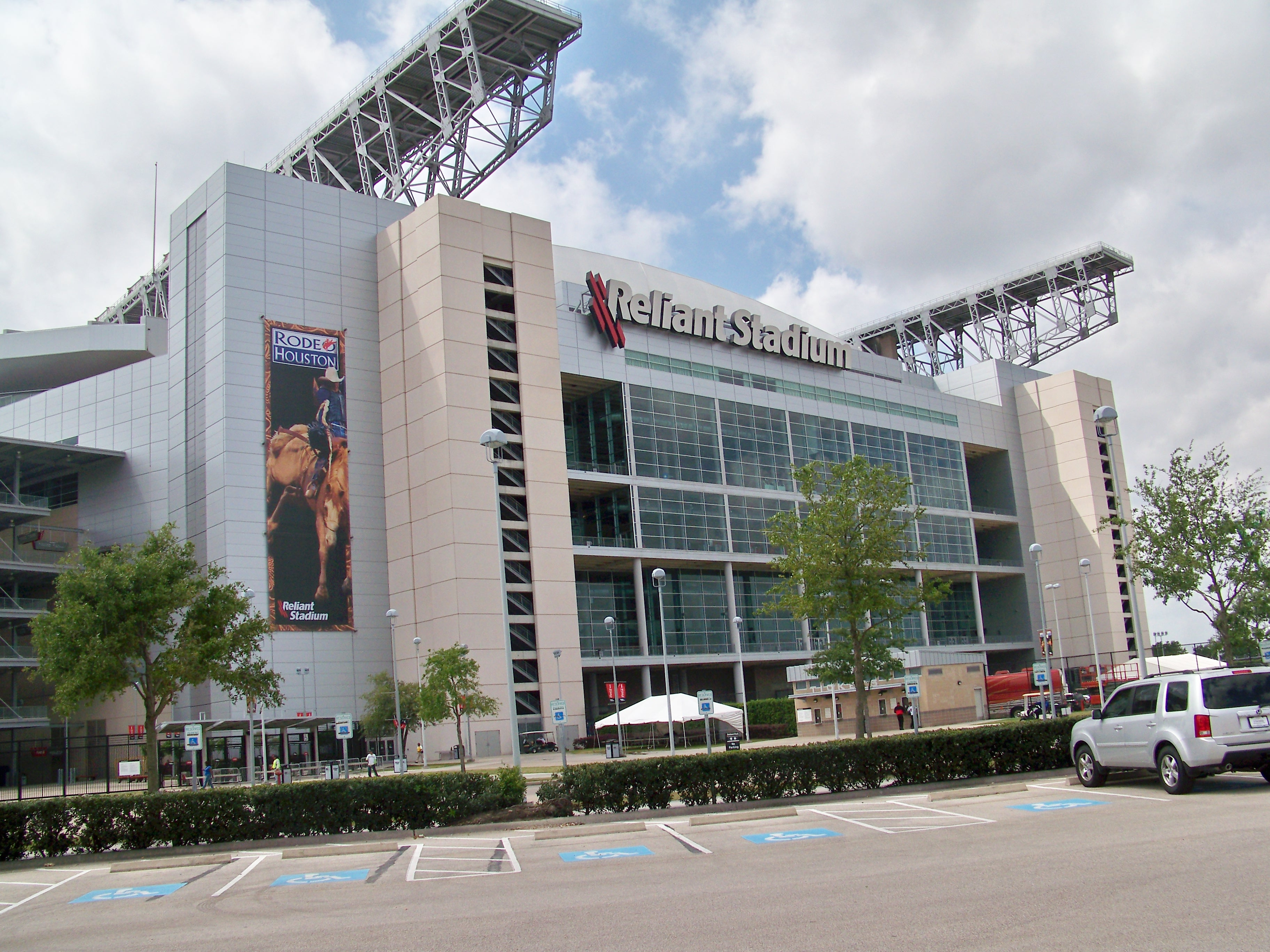
Reliant Stadium in Houston, Texas, was the site of the season-ending Final Four and Championship game for 2010–11.

National semifinals April 2
4	Kentucky	55
3	Connecticut	56
11	VCU	62
8	Butler	70

National championship game April 4
3	Connecticut	53
8	Butler	41

==== Tournament upsets ====
A "major upset" is defined as a win by a team seeded seven or more spots below its defeated opponent.

Date	Winner	Score	Loser
March 17	#13 Morehead State	62–61	#4 Louisville
March 17	#12 Richmond	69–66	#5 Vanderbilt
March 19	#8 Butler	71–70	#1 Pittsburgh
March 20	#11 VCU	94–76	#3 Purdue
March 20	#11 Marquette	66–62	#3 Syracuse
March 20	#10 Florida State	71–57	#2 Notre Dame
March 27	#11 VCU	71–61	#1 Kansas

=== National Invitation tournament ===
After the NCAA Tournament field was announced, the National Invitation Tournament invited 32 teams to participate.

==== NIT Semifinals and Final ====
Played at Madison Square Garden in New York City

Semifinals; March 29, 2011
1	Alabama	62
1	Colorado	61
2	Washington State	44
4	Wichita State	75

Championship game March 31, 2011
1	Alabama	57
4	Wichita State	66

=== College Basketball Invitational ===
The fourth College Basketball Invitational (CBI) Tournament was held beginning March 15 and ended with a best-of-three final, ending April 1. Creighton hosted Game 1 of the Championship Series, while Oregon hosted Games 2 and 3. Oregon defeated Creighton, 2 games to 1.

Semifinals; March 23, 2011
Boise State	71
Oregon	79
UCF	64
Creighton	82

Championship Series; March 28, 30, and April 1
Oregon	76	71	71
Creighton	84	58	69

=== CollegeInsider.com tournament ===
The third CollegeInsider.com Postseason Tournament was held beginning March 14 and ended with a championship game on March 30. This tournament places an emphasis on selecting successful teams from "mid-major" conferences who were left out of the NCAA Tournament and NIT. Santa Clara defeated Iona 76–69 in the final, and Santa Clara's Kevin Foster was tournament MVP.

Semifinals; March 25 and 26
1	Santa Clara	72
4	Southern Methodist	55
3	Iona	83
2	East Tennessee State	80

Championship; March 30
Santa Clara	76
Iona	69

== Award winners ==
=== Consensus All-American teams ===
Consensus First Team
Player	Position	Class	Team
Jimmer Fredette	PG	Senior	Brigham Young
JaJuan Johnson	C	Senior	Purdue
Nolan Smith	PG-SG	Senior	Duke
Jared Sullinger	PF-C	Freshman	Ohio State
Kemba Walker	PG	Junior	Connecticut

Consensus Second Team
Player	Position	Class	Team
Kenneth Faried	PF-C	Senior	Morehead State
Jordan Hamilton	SG-SF	Sophomore	Texas
Ben Hansbrough	PG	Senior	Notre Dame
Kawhi Leonard	SF	Sophomore	San Diego State
Marcus Morris	PF-C	Junior	Kansas
Jordan Taylor	PG	Junior	Wisconsin
Derrick Williams	SF-PF	Sophomore	Arizona

=== Major player of the year awards ===
- Wooden Award: Jimmer Fredette, Brigham Young
- Naismith Award: Jimmer Fredette, Brigham Young
- Associated Press Player of the Year: Jimmer Fredette, Brigham Young
- NABC Player of the Year: Jimmer Fredette, Brigham Young
- Oscar Robertson Trophy (USBWA): Jimmer Fredette, Brigham Young
- Adolph Rupp Trophy: Jimmer Fredette, Brigham Young
- Sporting News Player of the Year: Jimmer Fredette, Brigham Young

=== Major freshman of the year awards ===
- USBWA Freshman of the Year: Jared Sullinger, Ohio State
- Sporting News Freshman of the Year: Jared Sullinger, Ohio State

=== Major coach of the year awards ===
- Associated Press Coach of the Year: Mike Brey, Notre Dame
- Henry Iba Award (USBWA): Mike Brey, Notre Dame
- NABC Coach of the Year: Steve Fisher, San Diego State
- Naismith College Coach of the Year: Steve Fisher, San Diego State
- Adolph Rupp Cup: Steve Fisher, San Diego State
- Sporting News Coach of the Year: Jamie Dixon, Pittsburgh

=== Other major awards ===
- Bob Cousy Award (Best point guard): Kemba Walker, Connecticut
- Pete Newell Big Man Award (Best big man): JaJuan Johnson, Purdue
- NABC Defensive Player of the Year: Kenneth Faried, Morehead State
- Frances Pomeroy Naismith Award (Best senior 6'0"/1.83 m or shorter): Jacob Pullen, Kansas State
- Lowe's Senior CLASS Award (top senior): Jimmer Fredette, Brigham Young
- Robert V. Geasey Trophy (Top player in Philadelphia Big 5): Lavoy Allen, Temple
- NIT/Haggerty Award (Top player in New York City metro area): Charles Jenkins, Hofstra
- Ben Jobe Award (Top minority coach): Cuonzo Martin, Missouri State
- Hugh Durham Award (Top mid-major coach): Rick Byrd, Belmont
- Jim Phelan Award (Top head coach): Stew Morrill, Utah State
- Lefty Driesell Award (Top defensive player): Kent Bazemore, Old Dominion
- Lou Henson Award (Top mid-major player): Matt Howard, Butler
- Lute Olson Award (Top non-freshman or transfer player): Kemba Walker, Connecticut
- Skip Prosser Man of the Year Award (Coach with moral character): Chris Mack, Xavier
- Chip Hilton Player of the Year Award (Strong personal character): Charles Jenkins, Hofstra
- Elite 88 Award (Top GPA at Final Four): Matt Howard, Butler

== Coaching changes ==
A number of teams changed coaches during and after the season.

Team	Former Coach	Interim Coach	New Coach	Reason
Alabama A&M	L. Vann Pettaway		Willie Hayes	
Alcorn State	Larry Smith		Luther Riley	ASU alum Smith was moved to director of athletic development for the school.
Arkansas	John Pelphrey		Mike Anderson	
Boston University	Pat Chambers		Joe Jones	Chambers left to take the newly opened job at Penn State.
Bradley	Jim Les		Geno Ford	
Cal State Bakerfield	Keith Brown		Rod Barnes	Brown's contract was not renewed after the Roadrunners finished 9–19.
Colgate	Emmett Davis		Matt Langel	
Dayton	Brian Gregory		Archie Miller	Gregory accepted the head coaching job at Georgia Tech.
Eastern Michigan	Charles Ramsey		Rob Murphy	
Eastern Washington	Kirk Earlywine		Jim Hayford	Earlywine was informed his contract would not be renewed.
Fairfield	Ed Cooley		Sydney Johnson	Cooley accepted the vacant job at Providence
Florida A&M	Eugene Harris		Clemon Johnson	FAMU replaced Harris with star alum Johnson.
Florida Gulf Coast	Dave Balza		Andy Enfield	
Fresno State	Steve Cleveland		Rodney Terry	
George Mason	Jim Larranaga		Paul Hewitt	Larranaga accepted the University of Miami coaching job on April 22. Mason replaced him with Hewitt, who had just been fired by Georgia Tech.
George Washington	Karl Hobbs		Mike Lonergan	Hobbs was fired a week after GW hired a new athletic director. He had struggled in his last four seasons, going 25–39 in the A10. New hire Lonergan, previously Vermont head coach, has deep roots in the Washington area—he was born and raised in the Maryland suburbs, attended The Catholic University of America, coached Catholic for 13 seasons, including a Division III national title in 2001, and spent a year under Gary Williams at Maryland.
Georgia State	Rod Barnes	Paul Graham	Ron Hunter	Barnes was fired after four seasons at the conclusion of the 2010–11 regular season. Overall wins versus losses was the reason cited.
Georgia Tech	Paul Hewitt		Brian Gregory	Hewitt was fired six years following his lone Final Four appearance. Brian Gregory from Dayton was hired.
IPFW	Dane Fife		Tony Jasick	Fife left IPFW to become an assistant at Michigan State.
IUPUI	Ron Hunter		Todd Howard	Hunter left for Georgia State after 17 years.
Kennesaw State	Tony Ingle		Lewis Preston	The school decided not to renew Ingle or his staff to help turn around the team's academic performance.
Kent State	Geno Ford		Rob Senderoff	Ford left Kent State for Bradley after leading the team to a first-place MAC finish. The school promoted assistant Senderoff to the top job. At the time of his promotion, he was still under a show-cause penalty stemming from the Kelvin Sampson scandal at Indiana. The penalty expired on May 25.
Lamar	Steve Roccaforte		Pat Knight	
Louisiana Tech	Kerry Rupp		Michael White	
Loyola (IL)	Jim Whitesell		Porter Moser	
Manhattan	Barry Rohrssen		Steve Masiello	
Maryland	Gary Williams		Mark Turgeon	Williams retired at the end of the season after 22 years and a 461–252 (.646) record at his alma mater.
Miami (FL)	Frank Haith		Jim Larranaga	Haith left for the open Missouri job.
Missouri	Mike Anderson		Frank Haith	Arkansas hired former Nolan Richardson assistant Anderson.
Missouri State	Cuonzo Martin		Paul Lusk	Martin accepted the head coaching job at Tennessee.
Monmouth	Dave Calloway		King Rice	Calloway resigned under pressure, effective at the end of the season.
Murray State	Billy Kennedy		Steve Prohm	Kennedy left for the opening at Texas A&M. Steve Prohm had been an assistant coach at Murray State and was promoted on May 23 to be their new head coach.
Navy	Billy Lange		Ed DeChellis	Lange left to become Associate head coach at Villanova.
North Carolina State	Sidney Lowe		Mark Gottfried	Wolfpack alum Lowe resigned after failing to make the NCAA Tournament in his five-year tenure.
New Orleans	Joe Pasternack		Mark Slessinger	Pasternack resigned to become an assistant coach at Arizona under head coach Sean Miller. Mark Slessinger was hired to pilot the Privateers out of division I.
Northern Illinois	Ricardo Patton		Mark Montgomery	Former Colorado coach was fired from NIU after a 35-83 overall record in four seasons.
Oklahoma	Jeff Capel		Lon Kruger	Capel was fired just two years removed from an Elite Eight finish.
Penn State	Ed DeChellis		Pat Chambers	DeChellis made the unusual move of leaving a Big Ten school for Navy of the Patriot League.
Pepperdine	Tom Asbury		Marty Wilson	Asbury retired, turning the Waves program over to Associate head coach Wilson.
Princeton	Sydney Johnson		Mitch Henderson	Johnson left for the open Fairfield Job
Providence	Keno Davis		Ed Cooley	Davis was fired after only three seasons.
Radford	Brad Greenberg		Mike Jones	Greenberg was fired following a 5–24 season and after sitting out the final four games of the season for NCAA violations. In February 2012, he would be hit with a five-year show-cause penalty for misleading NCAA investigators.
Southern	Rob Spivery		Roman Banks	
Stetson	Derek Waugh		Casey Alexander	Waugh resigned after guiding the Hatters to only two winning seasons in 10+ years as coach.
Tennessee	Bruce Pearl		Cuonzo Martin	Pearl was fired on March 21 after finishing the season with a 30-point loss to Michigan in the NCAA Tournament's Round of 64. This followed a tumultuous season in which he was suspended for recruiting violations, fined, admitted to misleading NCAA investigators and finishing with only a 19–15 overall record.
Tennessee Tech	Mike Sutton		Steve Payne	Sutton retired and was replaced by top assistant Payne.
Texas A&M	Mark Turgeon		Billy Kennedy	Turgeon left in May for the Maryland job.
Texas A&M–Corpus Christi	Perry Clark		Willis Wilson	Clark was fired after finishing 10–21 in his fourth season. Athletic director Tim Fitzpatrick claimed that success for the men's basketball program is "critically important."
Texas Tech	Pat Knight		Billy Gillispie	Fired on March 7, 2011, after finishing the regular season 13-18 and missing NCAA tournament. Stated in preseason that he should lose his job if Texas Tech missed the NCAA tournament again.
Towson	Pat Kennedy		Pat Skerry	Announced on March 7, 2011, after finishing the regular season with a 4–26 record that included 19 straight losses.
UC Davis	Gary Stewart		Jim Les	
UNLV	Lon Kruger		Dave Rice	Kruger left for Oklahoma after reportedly turning the job down.
Utah	Jim Boylen		Larry Krystkowiak	Announced on March 12, 2011, after consecutive losing seasons, Boylen was relieved of his duties. Utah finished with a 13-18 overall record (6-10 MWC), the second-straight losing season for the Utes, who were 14–17 in 2009–10.
Valparaiso	Homer Drew		Bryce Drew	Homer's son, Bryce, had served as the associate head coach for a number of years prior to taking over the program in May 2011.
Vermont	Mike Lonergan		John Becker	
Wyoming	Heath Schroyer	Fred Langley	Larry Shyatt	Schroyer was the first coach fired during the season as he was let go on February 7, 2011, following an 8–15 start.

== Attendances ==
The top 10 NCAA Division I men's basketball teams by average home attendance in the 2010‑11 season:

#	College basketball team	Average attendance
1	Kentucky	23,603
2	Syracuse	22,312
3	Louisville	21,832
4	North Carolina	19,144
5	Tennessee	18,952
6	BYU	18,714
7	Wisconsin	17,230
8	Memphis	16,768
9	Kansas	16,436
10	Illinois	15,851
