= 2010–11 Boise State Broncos men's basketball team =

American college basketball season

2010–11 Boise State Broncos men's basketball

CBI, Semifinals
- Conference: Western Athletic Conference
- Record: 22–13 (10–6 WAC)
- Head coach: Leon Rice
- Assistant coaches: Dave Wojcik; Jeff Linder; Shaun Vandiver
- Home arena: Taco Bell Arena

2010–11 WAC men's basketball standings
	Conf.				Overall
Team	W		L	PCT	W		L	PCT
No. 19 Utah State †	15	–	1	.938	30	–	4	.882
Boise State	10	–	6	.625	22	–	13	.629
New Mexico State	9	–	7	.563	16	–	17	.485
Idaho	9	–	7	.563	18	–	14	.563
Hawaii	8	–	8	.500	19	–	13	.594
Nevada	8	–	8	.500	13	–	19	.406
Fresno State	6	–	10	.375	14	–	17	.452
San Jose State	5	–	11	.313	17	–	16	.515
Louisiana Tech	2	–	14	.125	12	–	20	.375
† 2011 WAC tournament winner Rankings from AP Poll

The 2010–11 Boise State Broncos men's basketball team represented Boise State University during the 2010–11 NCAA Division I men's basketball season. The Broncos, led by first year head coach Leon Rice, played their home games at Taco Bell Arena and were members of the Western Athletic Conference. They finished the season 22–13, 10–6 in WAC play to finish in second place. They advanced to the championship game of the 2011 WAC men's basketball tournament where they lost to Utah State. They were invited to the College Basketball Invitational where they defeated Austin Peay and Evansville before falling to Oregon in the semifinals.

This was the Broncos' final season in the WAC as they joined the Mountain West Conference effective July 1, 2011.

== Roster ==
Number	Name	Position	Height	Weight	Year	Hometown
1	Robert Arnold	Forward	6–6	176	Senior	Lancaster, California
2	Daequon Montreal	Forward	6–8	230	Senior	Syracuse, New York
3	G.A. Hill	Guard	5–10	150	Freshman	Aransas Pass, Texas
4	Justin Salzwedel	Guard	6–2	182	Senior	Phoenix, Arizona
10	Tre Nichols	Guard	5–11	168	Junior	Killeen, Texas
11	Jeff Elorriaga	Guard	6–2	180	Freshman	Portland, Oregon
12	La'Shard Anderson	Guard	6–1	170	Senior	San Diego, California
13	Isaac Oeltjen	Forward	7–0	224	Freshman	Welch, Minnesota
15	Thomas Bropleh	Forward	6–5	203	Freshman	Denver, Colorado
20	Sean Imadiyi	Forward	6–7	215	Senior	Chandler, Arizona
22	Drew Wiley	Guard	6–7	215	Junior	McKenzie River, Oregon
23	Ryan Watkins	Forward	6–8	247	Freshman	Santa Clarita, California
25	Paul Noonan	Forward	6–7	210	Senior	Beaverton, Oregon
30	Westly Perryman	Guard	6–1	180	Junior	Boston, Massachusetts
32	Zach Moritz	Center	6–10	239	Senior	Vancouver, Washington
42	Sam Hicks	Forward	6–9	248	Freshman	Redding, California

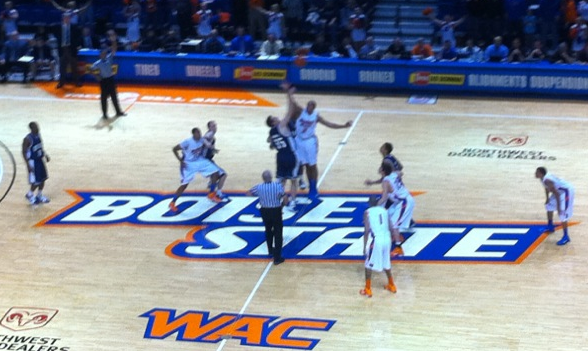
Boise State tips off vs Utah State on 1/13/11.

== Schedule ==
Date time, TV	Rank^{#}	Opponent^{#}	Result	Record	Site (attendance) city, state
Exhibition
10/29/10*; 7:00 pm		Montana Tech	W 77–58		Taco Bell Arena; Boise, ID
11/9/10*; 7:30 pm		Adams State	W 83–72		Taco Bell Arena; Boise, ID
Regular season
11/13/10*; 5:00 pm		Western State	W 78–52	1–0	Taco Bell Arena (2,447); Boise, ID
11/19/10*; 8:00 pm		at San Diego	W 65–60	2–0	Jenny Craig Pavilion (2,711); San Diego, CA
11/21/10*; 2:00 pm		at UC Davis	W 67–47	3–0	The Pavilion (1,012); Davis, CA
11/24/10*; 7:00 pm		Eastern Washington	W 83–54	4–0	Taco Bell Arena (2,959); Boise, ID
11/27/10*; 7:00 pm		Denver	W 65–52	5–0	Taco Bell Arena (2,337); Boise, ID
11/29/10*; 6:00 pm		at Northern Illinois	W 80–51	6–0	Convocation Center (694); DeKalb, IL
12/5/10*; 2:00 pm		Long Beach State	L 66–69	6–1	Taco Bell Arena (4,547); Boise, ID
12/8/10*; 8:00 pm		at No. 19 UNLV	L 72–75	6–2	Orleans Arena (8,320); Paradise, NV
12/12/10*; 1:00 pm		at Drake	L 69–72	6–3	Knapp Center (3,467); Des Moines, IA
12/17/10*; 7:00 pm		at Utah	L 84–86	6–4	Jon M. Huntsman Center (7,732); Salt Lake City, UT
12/19/10*; 7:00 pm		Texas–Pan American	W 91–62	7–4	Taco Bell Arena (1,503); Boise, ID
12/22/10*; 8:00 pm		at Portland	L 79–88	7–5	Chiles Center (2,729); Portland, OR
12/29/10; 8:15 pm		Louisiana Tech	W 71–60	8–5 (1–0)	Taco Bell Arena (4,084); Boise, Idaho
12/31/10; 5:00 pm		New Mexico State	W 81–78	9–5 (2–0)	Taco Bell Arena (3,145); Boise, ID
1/6/11; 8:30 pm		at San Jose State	W 102–101 ^{4OT}	10–5 (3–0)	The Event Center Arena (1,684); San Jose, CA
1/8/11; 10:30 pm		at Hawaii	W 79–55	11–5 (4–0)	Stan Sheriff Center (6,451); Honolulu, HI
1/13/11; 8:15 pm		Utah State	L 59–68	11–6 (4–1)	Taco Bell Arena (8,825); Boise, ID
1/15/11; 8:30 pm, WAC Sports Network		Nevada	L 67–69	11–7 (4–2)	Taco Bell Arena (6,472); Boise, ID
1/22/11; 8:00 pm, WAC Sports Network		at Idaho	W 70–67	12–7 (5–2)	Cowan Spectrum (5,016); Moscow, ID
1/27/11; 7:00 pm		at New Mexico State	L 87–96 ^{OT}	12–8 (5–3)	Pan American Center (5,622); Las Cruces, NM
1/29/11; 6:00 pm		at Louisiana Tech	L 60–70	12–9 (5–4)	Thomas Assembly Center (1,856); Ruston, LA
2/3/11; 7:00 pm		Hawaiʻi	L 66–73	12–10 (5–5)	Taco Bell Arena (3,418); Boise, ID
2/5/11; 7:00 pm		at No. 22 Utah State	L 49–77	12–11 (5–6)	Smith Spectrum (10,270); Logan, UT
2/10/11; 7:00 pm, WAC Sports Network		Fresno State	W 75–61	13–11 (6–6)	Taco Bell Arena (3,497); Boise, ID
2/12/11; 9:00 pm, ESPNU		Idaho	W 69–63	14–11 (7–6)	Taco Bell Arena (12,193); Boise, ID
2/19/11*; 8:00 pm		at UC Santa Barbara; ESPNU BracketBusters	W 78–76 ^{OT}	15–11	The Thunderdome (2,789); Santa Barbara, CA
2/24/11; 9:00 pm		at Fresno State	W 70–56	16–11 (8–6)	Save Mart Center (7,086); Fresno, CA
2/26/11; 8:30 pm, WAC Sports Network		at Nevada	W 72–66	17–11 (9–6)	Lawlor Events Center (5,018); Reno, NV
3/2/11*; 7:00 pm		Cal State Bakersfield	W 95–59	18–11	Taco Bell Arena (3,191); Boise, ID
3/5/11; 7:00 pm		San Jose State	W 66–51	19–11 (10–6)	Taco Bell Arena (6,286); Boise, ID
WAC tournament
3/11/11; 10:00 pm, ESPN2	(2)	vs. (3) New Mexico State; Semifinals	W 81–63	20–11	Orleans Arena (NA); Paradise, NV
3/12/11; 8:00 pm, ESPN2	(2)	vs. (1) No. 23 Utah State; Championship Game	L 69–77	20–12	Orleans Arena (NA); Paradise, NV
College Basketball Invitational
3/15/11*; 7:00 pm, HDNet		Austin Peay; First Round	W 83–80	21–12	Taco Bell Arena (2,684); Boise, ID
3/21/11*; 7:00 pm		Evansville; Quarterfinals	W 75–69	22–12	Taco Bell Arena (5,913); Boise, ID
3/23/11*; 8:00 pm, HDNet		at Oregon; Semifinals	L 71–79	22–13	Matthew Knight Arena (6,157); Eugene, OR
*Non-conference game. ^{#}Rankings from AP Poll. (#) Tournament seedings in parentheses. All times are in Mountain Time.
