= 2010–11 Utah State Aggies men's basketball team =

American college basketball season

2010–11 Utah State Aggies men's basketball
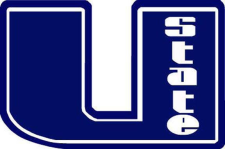

WAC Regular Season and tournament champions

NCAA Tournament, Round of 64
- Conference: Western Athletic Conference

Ranking
- Coaches: No. 25
- AP: No. 19
- Record: 30–4 (15–1 WAC)
- Head coach: Stew Morrill
- Assistant coaches: Tim Duryea; Chris Jones; Travis Felton
- Home arena: Smith Spectrum

2010–11 WAC men's basketball standings
	Conf.				Overall
Team	W		L	PCT	W		L	PCT
No. 19 Utah State †	15	–	1	.938	30	–	4	.882
Boise State	10	–	6	.625	22	–	13	.629
New Mexico State	9	–	7	.563	16	–	17	.485
Idaho	9	–	7	.563	18	–	14	.563
Hawaii	8	–	8	.500	19	–	13	.594
Nevada	8	–	8	.500	13	–	19	.406
Fresno State	6	–	10	.375	14	–	17	.452
San Jose State	5	–	11	.313	17	–	16	.515
Louisiana Tech	2	–	14	.125	12	–	20	.375
† 2011 WAC tournament winner Rankings from AP Poll

The 2010–11 Utah State Aggies men's basketball team represented Utah State University during the 2010–11 NCAA Division I men's basketball season. The Aggies, led by thirteenth year head coach Stew Morrill, played their home games at the Dee Glen Smith Spectrum and are members of the Western Athletic Conference. They finished the season 30–4, 15–1 in WAC play to win their 4th consecutive regular season conference title. They also won the 2011 WAC men's basketball tournament to earn an automatic bid in the 2011 NCAA Division I men's basketball tournament.

Although the Aggies were ranked 19th in the final AP poll and were one of seven teams in the country to win thirty games entering the tournament, the selection committee gave them a #12 seed in the Southeast Region where they faced Kansas State, the #5 seed who actually finished 21st in the final poll. Utah State was beaten by Kansas State by five points.

== Roster ==
Number	Name	Position	Height	Weight	Year	Hometown
3	Brockeith Pane	Guard	6–1	195	Junior	Dallas, Texas
4	Antonio Bumpus	Guard	6–3	185	Junior	Columbus, Ohio
5	Pooh Williams	Guard/Forward	6–4	190	Senior	Federal Way, Washington
10	Leon Cooper Jr.	Guard	6–1	182	Freshman	Freeport, Bahamas
11	Brad Brown	Forward	6–6	190	Freshman	Orono, Minnesota
13	Preston Medlin	Guard	6–4	175	Sophomore	Carrollton, Texas
14	E.J. Farris	Guard	6–2	185	Sophomore	Newark, California
15	James Walker III	Guard	6–2	180	Freshman	Long Beach, California
21	Morgan Grim	Forward	6–8	230	Junior	Riverton, Utah
22	Brady Jardine	Forward	6–7	220	Junior	Twin Falls, Idaho
23	Brian Green	Guard	6–1	200	Senior	Kaysville, Utah
24	Tyler Newbold	Guard	6–5	210	Senior	Payson, Utah
31	Ben Clifford	Forward	6–7	220	Freshman	South Jordan, Utah
35	Nate Bendall	Forward	6–9	250	Senior	Salt Lake City, Utah
42	Tai Wesley	Forward	6–7	240	Senior	Provo, Utah
44	Matt Formisano	Forward	6–8	240	Senior	Centennial, Colorado
45	Leland Miller	Center	7–1	230	Sophomore	St. George, Utah

== Schedule ==
Date time, TV	Rank^{#}	Opponent^{#}	Result	Record	Site (attendance) city, state
Exhibition
10/30/2010*; 7:00 pm		Laval	W 93–51	–	Smith Spectrum (6,888); Logan, UT
11/05/2010*; 7:00 pm		Grand Canyon	W 76–46		Smith Spectrum (N/A); Logan, UT
Regular season
11/13/2010*; 7:00 pm		Weber State	W 77–65	1–0	Smith Spectrum (9,014); Logan, UT
11/17/2010*; 7:00 pm, The Mtn.		at No. 23 BYU	L 72–78	1–1	Marriott Center (17,303); Provo, UT
11/20/2010*; 7:00 pm		at Southern Utah	W 66–53	2–1	Centrum Arena (4,303); Cedar City, UT
11/24/2010*; 7:00 pm, KUCW		Utah	W 79–62	3–1	Smith Spectrum (8,368); Logan, Utah
11/27/2010*; 7:00 pm		Northeastern	W 56–54	4–1	Smith Spectrum (6,761); Logan, Utah
12/01/2010*; 6:00 pm, FSNRM		at Denver	W 61–53	5–1	Magness Arena (2,580); Denver, CO
12/04/2010*; 12:00 pm, ESPNU		at No. 14 Georgetown	L 51–68	5–2	Verizon Center (12,106); Washington, D.C.
12/07/2010*; 7:00 pm		Long Beach State	W 81–53	6–2	Smith Spectrum (7,565); Logan, UT
12/11/2010*; 7:00 pm		Cal State Bakersfield	W 77–58	7–2	Smith Spectrum (8,194); Logan, UT
12/18/2010*; 7:00 pm		at Utah Valley	W 76–58	8–2	UCCU Center (7,124); Orem, UT
12/21/2010*; 8:15 pm		Idaho State; World Vision Invitational	W 71–48	9–2	Smith Spectrum (8,145); Logan, UT
12/22/2010*; 8:00 pm		Western Michigan; World Vision Invitational	W 78–57	10–2	Smith Spectrum (7,975); Logan, UT
12/23/2010*; 8:05 pm		Troy; World Vision Invitational	W 80–39	11–2	Smith Spectrum (8,323); Logan, UT
12/29/2010; 7:00 pm		Hawaii	W 74–66	12–2 (1–0)	Smith Spectrum (7,025); Logan, UT
12/31/2010; 7:00 pm		San Jose State	W 80–71	13–2 (2–0)	Smith Spectrum (6,732); Logan, UT
01/08/2011; 2:00 pm, ESPNU		at Nevada	W 81–67	14–2 (3–0)	Lawlor Events Center (4,339); Reno, NV
01/13/2011; 8:15 pm		at Boise State	W 68–59	15–2 (4–0)	Taco Bell Arena (8,825); Boise, ID
01/15/2011; 9:15 pm		at Fresno State	W 52–39	16–2 (5–0)	Save Mart Center (7,396); Fresno, CA
01/20/2011; 7:00 pm		Louisiana Tech	W 74–57	17–2 (6–0)	Smith Spectrum (9,768); Logan, UT
01/22/2011; 9:00 pm, ESPNU		New Mexico State	W 59–49	18–2 (7–0)	Smith Spectrum (10,013); Logan, UT
01/27/2011; 8:00 pm		at San Jose State	W 84–65	19–2 (8–0)	The Event Center Arena (2,391); San Jose, CA
01/29/2011; 10:00 pm		at Hawaiʻi	W 89–84 ^{2OT}	20–2 (9–0)	Stan Sheriff Center (8,127); Honolulu, HI
02/02/2011; 9:00 pm, ESPN2	No. 22	Nevada	W 67–45	21–2 (10–0)	Smith Spectrum (9,837); Logan, UT
02/05/2011; 7:00 pm, KUCW	No. 22	Boise State	W 77–49	22–2 (11–0)	Smith Spectrum (10,270); Logan, UT
02/09/2011; 9:00 pm, ESPN2	No. 21	at Idaho	L 56–64	22–3 (11–1)	Cowan Spectrum (1,512); Moscow, ID
02/12/2011; 7:00 pm, WSN	No. 21	Fresno State	W 71–55	23–3 (12–1)	Smith Spectrum (10,246); Logan, UT
02/16/2011*; 7:00 pm	No. 25	Montana Western	W 100–66	24–3	Smith Spectrum (9,943); Logan, UT
02/19/2011*; 7:00 pm, ESPN2	No. 25	at Saint Mary's; ESPN BracketBusters	W 75–65	25–3	McKeon Pavilion (3,500); Moraga, CA
02/26/2011; 7:00 pm		Idaho	W 84–68	26–3 (13–1)	Smith Spectrum (10,270); Logan, UT
03/02/2011; 9:00 pm, ESPN2	No. 25	at New Mexico State	W 58–54	27–3 (14–1)	Pan American Center (6,602); Las Cruces, NM
03/05/2011; 5:00 pm, ESPN+	No. 25	at Louisiana Tech	W 72–30	28–3 (15–1)	Thomas Assembly Center (2,141); Ruston, LA
WAC tournament
03/11/2011; 7:00 pm	(1) No. 23	vs. (8) San Jose State; Semifinals	W 58–54	29–3	Orleans Arena; Paradise, NV
03/12/2011; 8:00 pm, ESPN2	(1) No. 23	vs. (2) Boise State; Championship Game	W 77–69	30–3	Orleans Arena; Paradise, NV
NCAA tournament
03/17/2011*; 7:57 pm, truTV	(12 SE) No. 19	vs. (5 SE) No. 21 Kansas State; Second Round	L 68–73	30–4	McKale Center (10,293); Tucson, AZ
*Non-conference game. ^{#}Rankings from AP Poll. (#) Tournament seedings in parentheses. SE=NCAA Southeast Regional. All times are in Mountain Time.
