= 2010–11 Hawaii Rainbow Warriors basketball team =

American college basketball season

2010–11 Hawaii Rainbow Warriors basketball

CIT, Second Round
- Conference: Western Athletic Conference
- Record: 19–13 (8–8 WAC)
- Head coach: Gib Arnold (1st season)
- Associate head coach: Walter Roese (1st season)
- Assistant coaches: Benjy Taylor (1st season); Brandyn Akana (1st season)
- Home arena: Stan Sheriff Center

2010–11 WAC men's basketball standings
	Conf.				Overall
Team	W		L	PCT	W		L	PCT
No. 19 Utah State †	15	–	1	.938	30	–	4	.882
Boise State	10	–	6	.625	22	–	13	.629
New Mexico State	9	–	7	.563	16	–	17	.485
Idaho	9	–	7	.563	18	–	14	.563
Hawaii	8	–	8	.500	19	–	13	.594
Nevada	8	–	8	.500	13	–	19	.406
Fresno State	6	–	10	.375	14	–	17	.452
San Jose State	5	–	11	.313	17	–	16	.515
Louisiana Tech	2	–	14	.125	12	–	20	.375
† 2011 WAC tournament winner Rankings from AP Poll

The 2010–11 Hawaii Rainbow Warriors basketball team represented the University of Hawaiʻi at Mānoa in the 2010–11 NCAA Division I men's basketball season. The Rainbow Warriors, led by head coach Gib Arnold, played their home games at the Stan Sheriff Center in Honolulu, Hawaii, as members of the Western Athletic Conference. The Rainbow Warriors finished 5th in the WAC during the regular season, and lost in the first round of the WAC tournament to San Jose State.

Hawaii failed to qualify for the NCAA tournament, but were invited to the 2011 CIT. The Rainbow Warriors won their first game, but were then eliminated in the second round of the tournament, losing to San Francisco, 77–74.

== Roster ==
2010–11 Hawaii Rainbow Warriors men's basketball team
Players
Coaches

Pos.	#	Name	Height	Weight	Year	Hometown
G	1	Bobby Miles	6 ft 1 in (1.85 m)	190 lb (86 kg)	Fr	Los Angeles, California
G	2	Hiram Thompson	6 ft 3 in (1.91 m)	175 lb (79 kg)	Sr	Sacramento, California
G	3	Zane Johnson	6 ft 6 in (1.98 m)	210 lb (95 kg)	Jr	Phoenix, Arizona
F	4	Bill Amis	6 ft 9 in (2.06 m)	235 lb (107 kg)	Sr	Oklahoma City, Oklahoma
F	5	Joston Thomas	6 ft 7 in (2.01 m)	235 lb (107 kg)	So	Washington, D.C.
G	11	Jeremiah Ostrowski	5 ft 9 in (1.75 m)	175 lb (79 kg)	Jr	Aiea, Hawaii
G	12	Pi'i Minns	6 ft 4 in (1.93 m)	180 lb (82 kg)	So	Honolulu, Hawaii
C	15	Vander Joaquim	6 ft 10 in (2.08 m)	245 lb (111 kg)	So	Luanda, Angola
F	20	Trevor Wiseman	6 ft 7 in (2.01 m)	210 lb (95 kg)	Fr	Santa Clarita, California
F	21	Domenick Brumfield	6 ft 8 in (2.03 m)	215 lb (98 kg)	So	Carson, California
G	22	Jace Tavita	6 ft 4 in (1.93 m)	210 lb (95 kg)	Jr	Salt Lake City, Utah
F	24	Bo Barnes	6 ft 4 in (1.93 m)	190 lb (86 kg)	Fr	Scottsdale, Arizona
C	34	Douglas Kurtz	7 ft 0 in (2.13 m)	265 lb (120 kg)	Sr	Pelotas, Brazil
F	40	Davis Rozitis	7 ft 0 in (2.13 m)	230 lb (104 kg)	So	Cēsis, Latvia

Head coach

- Gib Arnold (UC San Diego)

Assistant coach(es)

- Walter Roese (BYU–Hawaii)
- Benjy Taylor (Richmond)
- Brandyn Akana (BYU–Hawaii)

Legend

- (C) Team captain
- (S) Suspended
- (I) Ineligible
- (W) Walk-on
- Injured
- Current redshirt

Roster
Last update: January 18, 2023

== Schedule and results ==
Date time, TV	Rank^{#}	Opponent^{#}	Result	Record	Site (attendance) city, state
Exhibition
November 6, 2010*; 7:00 pm		Chaminade	W 83–55	—	Stan Sheriff Center; Honolulu, HI
Regular season
November 12, 2010*; 7:00 pm		Montana State; Rainbow Classic	W 77–59	1–0	Stan Sheriff Center (6,416); Honolulu, HI
November 13, 2010*; 7:00 pm		Cal State Fullerton; Rainbow Classic	W 84–70	2–0	Stan Sheriff Center (6,239); Honolulu, HI
November 15, 2010*; 11:00 pm, ESPN		Central Michigan; Rainbow Classic	W 65–62	3–0	Stan Sheriff Center (6,054); Honolulu, HI
November 19, 2010*; 7:30 pm, KFVE-TV		Central Arkansas	W 83–69	4–0	Stan Sheriff Center (5,978); Honolulu, HI
November 24, 2010*; 7:00 pm		Arkansas–Pine Bluff	W 70–63	5–0	Stan Sheriff Center (5,676); Honolulu, HI
December 1, 2010*; 5:00 pm		at Cal Poly	L 53–54	5–1	Mott Gym (1,509); San Luis Obispo, CA
December 4, 2010*; 1:00 pm		vs. No. 21 BYU	L 57–78	5–2	EnergySolutions Arena (13,312); Salt Lake City, UT
December 11, 2010*; 7:00 pm, KFVE-TV		Hawaii Pacific	W 72–50	6–2	Stan Sheriff Center (5,507); Honolulu, HI
December 17, 2010*; 7:00 pm		vs. Chicago State	W 86–57	7–2	Lahaina Civic Center (981); Lahaina, HI
December 23, 2010*; 8:00 pm, ESPNU		Florida State; Diamond Head Classic	L 62–70	7–3	Stan Sheriff Center (8,544); Honolulu, HI
December 23, 2010*; 7:30 pm, ESPNU		Utah; Diamond Head Classic	W 68–55	8–3	Stan Sheriff Center (6,667); Honolulu, HI
December 25, 2010*; 11:30 am		Mississippi State; Diamond Head Classic	W 68–57	9–3	Stan Sheriff Center (6,694); Honolulu, HI
December 29, 2010; 4:05 pm		at Utah State	L 66–74	9–4 (0–1)	Smith Spectrum (7,025); Logan, UT
December 31, 2010; 3:00 pm, ESPNU		at Nevada	L 69–86	9–5 (0–2)	Lawlor Events Center (4,308); Reno, NV
January 6, 2011; 7:30 pm, KFVE-TV		Idaho	L 44–59	9–6 (0–3)	Stan Sheriff Center (5,605); Honolulu, HI
January 8, 2011; 7:30 pm, KFVE-TV		Boise State	L 55–79	9–7 (0–4)	Stan Sheriff Center (6,451); Honolulu, HI
January 13, 2011; 4:00 pm		at New Mexico State	L 64–82	9–8 (0–5)	Pan American Center (5,522); Las Cruces, NM
January 15, 2011; 3:00 pm		at Louisiana Tech	W 56–48	10–8 (1–5)	Thomas Assembly Center (1,719); Ruston, LA
January 20, 2011; 7:00 pm, KFVE-TV		Fresno State	W 62–52	11–8 (2–5)	Stan Sheriff Center (5,492); Honolulu, HI
January 22, 2011; 7:00 pm, KFVE-TV		San Jose State	W 67–61	12–8 (3–5)	Stan Sheriff Center (6,236); Honolulu, HI
January 29, 2011; 7:00 pm, KFVE-TV		Utah State	L 84–89 ^{2OT}	12–9 (3–6)	Stan Sheriff Center (8,127); Honolulu, HI
February 3, 2011; 4:05 pm		at Boise State	W 73–66	13–9 (4–6)	Taco Bell Arena (3,418); Boise, ID
February 5, 2011; 5:05 pm		at Idaho	L 61–75	13–10 (4–7)	Cowan Spectrum (1,191); Moscow, ID
February 14, 2011; 7:00 pm, KFVE-TV		Nevada	W 69–67 ^{OT}	14–10 (5–7)	Stan Sheriff Center (5,813); Honolulu, HI
February 19, 2011*; 12:00 pm		at UC Davis; ESPN BracketBusters	W 83–69	15–10	The Pavilion (1,736); Davis, CA
February 24, 2011; 7:30 pm, KFVE-TV		Louisiana Tech	W 71–58	16–10 (6–7)	Stan Sheriff Center (6,105); Honolulu, HI
February 26, 2011; 7:00 pm, KFVE-TV		New Mexico State	W 76–70	17–10 (7–7)	Stan Sheriff Center (8,148); Honolulu, HI
March 3, 2011; 5:30 pm		at San Jose State	W 77–71	18–10 (8–7)	Event Center Arena (2,823); San Jose, CA
March 5, 2011; 6:00 pm		at Fresno State	L 70–85	18–11 (8–8)	Save Mart Center (7,917); Fresno, CA
WAC tournament
March 9, 2011; 10:00 am	(5)	vs. (8) San Jose State; WAC First Round	L 74–75	18–12	Orleans Arena (2,814); Las Vegas, NV
CollegeInsider.com tournament
March 15, 2011; 7:00 pm		Portland; CIT First Round	W 76–64	19–12	Stan Sheriff Center (4,431); Honolulu, HI
March 19, 2011; 7:00 pm		San Francisco; CIT Second Round	L 74–77	19–13	Stan Sheriff Center (6,491); Honolulu, HI
*Non-conference game. ^{#}Rankings from AP Poll. (#) Tournament seedings in parentheses. All times are in Hawaiian Time.
