= 2010–11 Louisiana Tech Bulldogs basketball team =

American college basketball season

2010–11 Louisiana Tech Bulldogs men's basketball
- Conference: Western Athletic Conference
- Record: 12–20 (2–14 WAC)
- Head coach: Kerry Rupp (4th season)
- Assistant coaches: Curtis Condie; Dusty May; Derrick Jones
- Home arena: Thomas Assembly Center

2010–11 WAC men's basketball standings
	Conf.				Overall
Team	W		L	PCT	W		L	PCT
No. 19 Utah State †	15	–	1	.938	30	–	4	.882
Boise State	10	–	6	.625	22	–	13	.629
New Mexico State	9	–	7	.563	16	–	17	.485
Idaho	9	–	7	.563	18	–	14	.563
Hawaii	8	–	8	.500	19	–	13	.594
Nevada	8	–	8	.500	13	–	19	.406
Fresno State	6	–	10	.375	14	–	17	.452
San Jose State	5	–	11	.313	17	–	16	.515
Louisiana Tech	2	–	14	.125	12	–	20	.375
† 2011 WAC tournament winner Rankings from AP Poll

The 2010–11 Louisiana Tech Bulldogs basketball team represented Louisiana Tech University during the 2010–11 NCAA Division I men's basketball season. The Bulldogs, led by fourth year head coach Kerry Rupp, played their home games at the Thomas Assembly Center and were members of the Western Athletic Conference. They finished the season 12–20, 2–14 in WAC play to finish in last place and did not qualify for the WAC tournament. Notable staff members are Dusty May, Cody Fueger, and Tyler Warren.

== Roster ==
2010–11 Louisiana Tech Bulldogs men's basketball team
Players
Coaches

Pos.	#	Name	Height	Weight	Year	Hometown
G	2	Brandon Gibson	6 ft 5 in (1.96 m)	225 lb (102 kg)	RS So	Marianna, FL
G	3	C.J. Scott	6 ft 1 in (1.85 m)	205 lb (93 kg)	Jr	Milford, DE
F	5	Olu Ashaolu	6 ft 7 in (2.01 m)	228 lb (103 kg)	RS Jr	Toronto, Canada
F	10	Stojan Gjuroski	6 ft 7 in (2.01 m)	195 lb (88 kg)	Fr	Gostivar, Macedonia
G	11	DeAndre Brown	5 ft 11 in (1.8 m)	165 lb (75 kg)	Sr	Fort Worth, TX
G	14	Tevin Hall	5 ft 10 in (1.78 m)	157 lb (71 kg)	So	Bossier City, LA
C	15	Antwond Roshell	6 ft 9 in (2.06 m)	250 lb (113 kg)	Jr	Milwaukee, WI
G	20	Lonnie Smith	6 ft 5 in (1.96 m)	185 lb (84 kg)	Fr	Birmingham, AL
G	21	Kenyon McNeail	6 ft 1 in (1.85 m)	185 lb (84 kg)	Fr	Conway, AR
G	22	Cordarius Johnson	6 ft 5 in (1.96 m)	215 lb (98 kg)	Fr	Coushatta, LA
F/C	23	James Johnson	6 ft 7 in (2.01 m)	250 lb (113 kg)	Fr	North Hills, CA
F	24	Darius Redding	6 ft 4 in (1.93 m)	205 lb (93 kg)	So	Tallahassee, FL
F/C	25	J.L. Lewis	6 ft 8 in (2.03 m)	240 lb (109 kg)	So	Gonzales, LA
G	30	Justin Rake	6 ft 3 in (1.91 m)	210 lb (95 kg)	So	Chicago, IL
F/C	45	Romario Souza	6 ft 10 in (2.08 m)	245 lb (111 kg)	Jr	Minas Gerais, Brazil

Head coach

- Kerry Rupp (Southern Utah)

Assistant coach(es)

- Curtis Condie (Utah State)
- Dusty May (Indiana)
- Derrick Jones (Samford)

Legend

- (C) Team captain
- (S) Suspended
- (I) Ineligible
- (W) Walk-on
- Injured
- Current redshirt

Roster
Last update: 2010-10-08

== Schedule ==
Date time, TV	Rank^{#}	Opponent^{#}	Result	Record	Site (attendance) city, state
Exhibition
November 2, 2010*; 8:00 pm		Champion Baptist	W 84–45	—	Thomas Assembly Center; Ruston, LA
Regular season
November 10, 2010*; 8:00 pm, ESPNU		at Texas; 2K Sports Classic	L 58–89	0–1	Frank Erwin Center (5,619); Austin, TX
November 13, 2010*; 8:00 pm		Austin College	W 90–58	1–1	Thomas Assembly Center (1,502); Ruston, LA
November 17, 2010*; 7:00 pm		Houston	W 60–54	2–1	Thomas Assembly Center (1,840); Ruston, LA
November 19, 2010*; 7:00 pm		vs. Seattle; 2K Sports Classic	W 85–72	3–1	Bren Events Center (1,169); Irvine, CA
November 20, 2010*; 7:00 pm		vs. Navy; 2K Sports Classic	W 80–65	4–1	Bren Events Center (1,245); Irvine, CA
November 21, 2010*; 7:30 pm		at UC Irvine; 2K Sports Classic	W 76–72	5–1	Bren Events Center (911); Irvine, CA
November 26, 2010*; 2:00 pm		at Arkansas–Little Rock	L 65–74	5–2	Jack Stephens Center (2,336); Little Rock, AR
December 1, 2010*; 7:00 pm		SMU	W 69–64	6–2	Thomas Assembly Center (2,191); Ruston, LA
December 4, 2010*; 7:00 pm		Louisiana–Monroe	W 67–58	7–2	Thomas Assembly Center (4,123); Ruston, LA
December 7, 2010*; 7:00 pm		at Northwestern State	L 78–85	7–3	Prather Coliseum (2,211); Natchitoches, LA
December 11, 2010*; 3:00 pm		at McNeese State	L 70–80	7–4	Burton Coliseum (619); Lake Charles, LA
December 14, 2010*; 7:35 pm		at Houston Baptist	W 80–57	8–4	Sharp Gymnasium (524); Houston, TX
December 18, 2010*; 7:00 pm		Texas–Arlington	W 62–61	9–4	Thomas Assembly Center (1,633); Ruston, LA
December 21, 2010*; 7:05 pm		at Iowa	L 58–77	9–5	Carver–Hawkeye Arena (10,334); Iowa City, IA
December 29, 2010; 9:00 pm		at Boise State	L 60–71	9–6 (0–1)	Taco Bell Arena (4,084); Boise, ID
December 31, 2010; 9:05 pm		at Idaho	L 47–77	9–7 (0–2)	Cowan Spectrum (511); Moscow, ID
January 6, 2011; 7:00 pm		Fresno State	L 56–63	9–8 (0–3)	Thomas Assembly Center (1,905); Ruston, LA
January 13, 2011; 7:00 pm		San Jose State	L 74–79	9–9 (0–4)	Thomas Assembly Center (1,905); Ruston, LA
January 15, 2011; 7:00 pm		Hawaii	L 48–56	9–10 (0–5)	Thomas Assembly Center (1,719); Ruston, LA
January 20, 2011; 8:05 pm		at Utah State	L 57–74	9–11 (0–6)	Smith Spectrum (9,768); Logan, UT
January 22, 2011; 9:30 pm		at Nevada	L 58–66	9–12 (0–7)	Lawlor Events Center (5,511); Reno, NV
January 27, 2011; 7:00 pm, ERT		Idaho	W 71–56	10–12 (1–7)	Thomas Assembly Center (1,830); Ruston, LA
January 29, 2011; 7:00 pm		Boise State	W 70–60	11–12 (2–7)	Thomas Assembly Center (1,856); Ruston, LA
February 5, 2011; 10:00 pm, ESPNU		at Fresno State	L 64–72	11–13 (2–8)	Save Mart Center (9,059); Fresno, CA
February 7, 2011; 8:00 pm		at New Mexico State	L 57–75	11–14 (2–9)	Pan American Center (5,084); Las Cruces, NM
February 12, 2011; 3:00 pm, ERT		New Mexico State	L 49–50	11–15 (2–10)	Thomas Assembly Center (2,399); Ruston, LA
February 16, 2011*; 7:00 pm		at North Dakota	L 73–76	11–16	Betty Engelstad Sioux Center (1,709); Grand Forks, ND
February 19, 2011*; 3:00 pm		Georgia State; ESPN BracketBusters	W 51–45	12–16	Thomas Assembly Center (3,162); Ruston, LA
February 24, 2011; 11:30 pm		at Hawaii	L 58–71	12–17 (2–11)	Stan Sheriff Center (6,105); Honolulu, HI
February 26, 2011; 8:00 pm		at San Jose State	L 60–72	12–18 (2–12)	Event Center Arena (1,879); San Jose, CA
March 3, 2011; 8:00 pm		Nevada	L 70–73	12–19 (2–13)	Thomas Assembly Center (2,145); Ruston, LA
March 5, 2011; 6:00 pm, ERT		No. 25 Utah State	L 30–72	12–20 (2–14)	Thomas Assembly Center (2,141); Ruston, LA
*Non-conference game. ^{#}Rankings from AP Poll. (#) Tournament seedings in parentheses. All times are in Central Time.
