= 2010–11 Nevada Wolf Pack men's basketball team =

American college basketball season

2010–11 Nevada Wolf Pack men's basketball
- Conference: Western Athletic Conference
- Record: 13–19 (8–8 WAC)
- Head coach: David Carter (2nd season)
- Assistant coaches: Doug Novsek; Keith Brown; Zac Claus
- Home arena: Lawlor Events Center

2010–11 WAC men's basketball standings
	Conf.				Overall
Team	W		L	PCT	W		L	PCT
No. 19 Utah State †	15	–	1	.938	30	–	4	.882
Boise State	10	–	6	.625	22	–	13	.629
New Mexico State	9	–	7	.563	16	–	17	.485
Idaho	9	–	7	.563	18	–	14	.563
Hawaii	8	–	8	.500	19	–	13	.594
Nevada	8	–	8	.500	13	–	19	.406
Fresno State	6	–	10	.375	14	–	17	.452
San Jose State	5	–	11	.313	17	–	16	.515
Louisiana Tech	2	–	14	.125	12	–	20	.375
† 2011 WAC tournament winner Rankings from AP Poll

The 2010–11 Nevada Wolf Pack men's basketball team represented the University of Nevada, Reno during the 2010–11 NCAA Division I men's basketball season. The Wolf Pack, led by second year head coach David Carter, played their home games at the Lawlor Events Center and were members of the Western Athletic Conference (WAC). They finished the season 13–18, 8–8 in WAC play. They lost to New Mexico State in the semifinals of the WAC tournament.

== Roster ==
Number	Name	Position	Height	Weight	Year	Hometown
1	Patrick Nyeko	Guard	6–6	180	Junior	London, England
2	Jerry Evans, Jr.	Guard	6–8	188	Sophomore	Lawndale, California
4	Devonte Elliott	Forward	6–10	220	Sophomore	Los Angeles, California
11	Brice Crook	Guard	6–4	205	Sophomore	Reno, Nevada
12	Keith Fuetsch	Guard	6–0	170	Junior	Reno, Nevada
15	Jordan Finn	Guard	6–4	190	Sophomore	Rancho Cucamonga, California
20	Jordan Burris	Guard	6–7	205	Sophomore	Bakersfield, California
24	Deonte Burton	Guard	6–1	185	Freshman	Los Angeles, California
31	Olek Czyz	Forward	6–7	240	Junior	Gdynia, Poland
33	Kevin Panzer	Forward	6–9	205	Sophomore	Mission Viejo, California
34	Milik Story	Guard	6–5	225	Junior	Pasadena, California
44	Dario Hunt	Forward	6–8	235	Senior	Colorado Springs, Colorado
45	Richard Bell	Forward	6–9	215	Freshman	West Sussex, England

== Schedule ==
Date time, TV	Rank^{#}	Opponent^{#}	Result	Record	Site (attendance) city, state
Exhibition
11/06/2010*; 7:05 pm		Seattle Pacific	L 81–84	—	Lawlor Events Center (2,984); Reno, NV
Regular season
11/13/2010*; 2:00 pm		Montana	W 81–66	1–0	Lawlor Events Center (4,408); Reno, NV
11/16/2010*; 5:30 pm		vs. Pacific; NIT Season Tip-Off	L 53–64	1–1	Pauley Pavilion (6,748); Los Angeles, CA
11/17/2010*; 6:00 pm		vs. Pepperdine; NIT Season Tip-Off	L 75–76	1–2	Pauley Pavilion (8,345); Los Angeles, CA
11/22/2010*; 5:00 pm		at George Washington; NIT Season Tip-Off consolation round	L 56–58	1–3	Smith Center (832); Washington, D.C.
11/23/2010*; 2:30 pm		vs. Boston University; NIT Season Tip-Off consolation round	L 57–60	1–4	Smith Center (532); Washington, D.C.
11/30/2010*; 5:00 pm		at South Dakota State	L 65–82	1–5	Frost Arena (2,027); Brookings, SD
12/04/2010*; 8:00 pm		No. 24 UNLV	L 70–82	1–6	Lawlor Events Center (5,967); Reno, NV
12/06/2010*; 5:00 pm		at Houston	L 61–64	1–7	Hofheinz Pavilion (2,712); Houston, TX
12/11/2010*; 5:00 pm		San Francisco State	W 78–64	2–7	Lawlor Events Center (3,763); Reno, NV
12/17/2010*; 6:00 pm, ESPNU		Arizona State	L 75–78	2–8	Lawlor Events Center (3,666); Reno, NV
12/20/2010*; 7:30 pm		Portland State	W 79–73	3–8	Lawlor Events Center (3,954); Reno, NV
12/22/2010*; 7:00 pm		at Washington	L 60–90	3–9	Alaska Airlines Arena (10,000); Seattle, WA
12/27/2010*; 7:00 pm		at Portland	L 62–66	3–10	Chiles Center (2,071); Portland, OR
12/31/2010; 5:05 pm, ESPNU		Hawaii	W 86–69	4–10 (1–0)	Lawlor Events Center (4,308); Reno, NV
01/03/2011; 8:00 pm		at Fresno State	L 74–80	4–11 (1–1)	Save Mart Center (7,193); Fresno, CA
01/08/2011; 1:05 pm, ESPNU		Utah State	L 67–81	4–12 (1–2)	Lawlor Events Center (4,339); Reno, NV
01/12/2011; 7:00 pm, ESPN2		at Idaho	L 67–72	4–13 (1–3)	Cowan Spectrum (1,550); Moscow, ID
01/15/2011; 6:05 pm, WSN		at Boise State	W 69–67	5–13 (2–3)	Taco Bell Arena (6,473); Boise, ID
01/20/2011; 7:30 pm		New Mexico State	W 90–71	6–13 (3–3)	Lawlor Events Center (4,871); Reno, NV
01/22/2011; 7:30 pm		Louisiana Tech	W 66–58	7–13 (4–3)	Lawlor Events Center (5,511); Reno, NV
01/27/2011; 7:30 pm, WSN		Fresno State	W 79–76	8–13 (5–3)	Lawlor Events Center (4,945); Reno, NV
02/02/2011; 8:05 pm, ESPN2		at No. 22 Utah State	L 45–67	8–14 (5–4)	Smith Spectrum (9,837); Logan, UT
02/05/2011; 7:30 pm		San Jose State	W 89–69	9–14 (6–4)	Lawlor Events Center (4,946); Reno, NV
02/12/2011; 7:00 pm, WSN		at San Jose State	W 84–76 ^{OT}	10–14 (7–4)	Event Center Arena (1,544); San Jose, CA
02/14/2011; 2:05 pm		at Hawai'i	L 67–69 ^{OT}	10–15 (7–5)	Stan Sheriff Center (5,813); Honolulu, HI
02/19/2011*; 2:05 pm		UC Irvine; ESPN BracketBusters	W 74–63	11–15	Lawlor Events Center (4,543); Reno, NV
02/24/2011; 7:30 pm		Idaho	L 59–67	11–16 (7–6)	Lawlor Events Center (4,578); Reno, NV
02/26/2011; 7:30 pm, WSN		Boise State	L 66–72	11–17 (7–7)	Lawlor Events Center (5,018); Reno, NV
03/03/2011; 6:00 pm		at Louisiana Tech	W 73–70	12–17 (8–7)	Thomas Assembly Center (2,145); Ruston, LA
03/05/2011; 6:00 pm, WSN		at New Mexico State	L 68–77	12–18 (8–8)	Pan American Center (6,177); Las Cruces, NM
WAC tournament
03/09/2011; 2:30 pm	(6)	vs. (7) Fresno State; WAC First Round	W 90–80	13–18	Orleans Arena (2,814); Paradise, NV
03/10/2011; 2:30 pm, ESPNU	(6)	vs. (3) New Mexico State; WAC Quarterfinals	L 60–66	13–19	Orleans Arena (2,958); Paradise, NV
*Non-conference game. ^{#}Rankings from AP Poll. (#) Tournament seedings in parentheses. All times are in Pacific Time.
