= 2010–11 New Mexico State Aggies men's basketball team =

American college basketball season

2010–11 New Mexico State Aggies men's basketball
- Conference: Western Athletic Conference
- Record: 16–17 (8–8 WAC)
- Head coach: Marvin Menzies
- Assistant coaches: Mick Durham; Gerald Lewis; Paul Weir
- Home arena: Pan American Center

2010–11 WAC men's basketball standings
	Conf.				Overall
Team	W		L	PCT	W		L	PCT
No. 19 Utah State †	15	–	1	.938	30	–	4	.882
Boise State	10	–	6	.625	22	–	13	.629
New Mexico State	9	–	7	.563	16	–	17	.485
Idaho	9	–	7	.563	18	–	14	.563
Hawaii	8	–	8	.500	19	–	13	.594
Nevada	8	–	8	.500	13	–	19	.406
Fresno State	6	–	10	.375	14	–	17	.452
San Jose State	5	–	11	.313	17	–	16	.515
Louisiana Tech	2	–	14	.125	12	–	20	.375
† 2011 WAC tournament winner Rankings from AP Poll

The 2010–11 New Mexico State Aggies men's basketball team represented New Mexico State University in the 2010–11 college basketball season. This was Marvin Menzies 4th season as head coach. The Aggies played their home games at Pan American Center and competed in the Western Athletic Conference. They finished the season 16–17, 8–8 in WAC play.

== Roster ==
2010–11 New Mexico State Aggies men's basketball team
Players
Coaches

Pos.	#	Name	Height	Weight	Year	Previous school	Hometown
F	1	Christian Kabongo	6 ft 4 in (1.93 m)	199 lb (90 kg)	Fr	Central Commerce Collegiate	Toronto, ON
G	5	Drew Herig	6 ft 0 in (1.83 m)	183 lb (83 kg)	Fr	Sandia High School	Albuquerque, NM
F	10	Bandja Sy	6 ft 8 in (2.03 m)	214 lb (97 kg)	So	Stoneridge Prep	Cergy, France
G	13	Hernst Laroche	6 ft 1 in (1.85 m)	170 lb (77 kg)	Jr	Vanier College	Montreal, Quebec
C	15	Tshilidzi Nephawe	6 ft 10 in (2.08 m)	268 lb (122 kg)	Fr	Stoneridge Prep	Johannesburg, South Africa
G	21	Makhtar Diop	6 ft 6 in (1.98 m)	195 lb (88 kg)	Jr	St. Jeanne d'Arc Institute	Dakar, Senegal
F	25	Renaldo Dixon	6 ft 10 in (2.08 m)	210 lb (95 kg)	Fr	Christian Faith Academy	Toronto, ON
F	31	Wendell McKines	6 ft 6 in (1.98 m)	230 lb (104 kg)	Sr	Richmond HS	Oakland, CA
C	32	Hamidu Rahman	6 ft 11 in (2.11 m)	245 lb (111 kg)	Jr	American Christian School	Somerset, NJ
F	33	Troy Gillenwater	6 ft 8 in (2.03 m)	238 lb (108 kg)	Jr	Stoneridge Prep	Boston, MA
G	34	Gordo Castillo	6 ft 5 in (1.96 m)	190 lb (86 kg)	Sr	Las Cruces High School	Las Cruces, NM
F	35	B.J. West	6 ft 11 in (2.11 m)	240 lb (109 kg)	Jr	God's Academy	Cheneyville, LA
F	45	Tyrone Watson	6 ft 5 in (1.96 m)	225 lb (102 kg)	So	Cathedral High School	Hamilton, Ontario
C	55	Abdoulaye N'doye	7 ft 0 in (2.13 m)	215 lb (98 kg)	So	International School of Management	Dakar, Senegal

Head coach

- Marvin Menzies (UCLA)

Assistant coach(es)

- Mick Durham (Montana State)
- Gerald Lewis (SMU)
- Paul Weir (York)

Legend

- (C) Team captain
- (S) Suspended
- (I) Ineligible
- (W) Walk-on
- Injured
- Current redshirt

Roster

== 2010–11 Schedule and results ==
- All times are Mountain

Date time, TV	Rank^{#}	Opponent^{#}	Result	Record	High points	High rebounds	High assists	Site (attendance) city, state
Exhibition
11/08/2010*; 7:00 pm		Eastern New Mexico	W 98–72	–	18 – Gillenwater	4 – Nephawe	4 – 3 Tied	Pan American Center (3,621); Las Cruces, New Mexico
Regular season
11/12/2010*; 6:00 pm		at Louisiana–Lafayette	W 92–76	1–0	30 – Gillenwater	8 – Gillenwater	8 – Laroche	Cajundome (3,488); Lafayette, Louisiana
11/15/2010*; 7:00 pm		Western New Mexico; Hall of Fame Tip Off	W 95–62	2–0	21 – Gillenwater	9 – Sy	8 – Laroche	Pan American Center (5,004); Las Cruces, New Mexico
11/18/2010*; 6:30 pm, FSAZ		at Arizona	L 57–83	2–1	25 – Gillenwater	6 – Gillenwater	4 – Watson	McKale Center (13,590); Tucson, Arizona
11/20/2010*; 5:30 pm		vs. UMass; Hall of Fame Tip Off	L 57–71	2–2	13 – Gillenwater	7 – Gillenwater	3 – Laroche	MassMutual Center (2,274); Springfield, Massachusetts
11/21/2010*; 12:30 pm		vs. USC; Hall of Fame Tip Off	L 61–80	2–3	14 – Kabongo	7 – Kabongo/Nephawe	5 – Laroche	MassMutual Center (N/A); Springfield, Massachusetts
11/23/2010*; 7:00 pm		at UTEP; Battle of I-10	L 56–73	2–4	18 – Gillenwater	14 – Gillenwater	3 – Watson	Don Haskins Center (11,792); El Paso, Texas
11/30/2010*; 7:00 pm		UTEP; Battle of I-10	L 72–74	2–5	22 – Gillenwater	10 – Gillenwater	4 – Laroche	Pan American Center (8,488); Las Cruces, New Mexico
12/04/2010*; 7:00 pm, AggieVision		New Mexico; Rio Grande Rivalry	L 78–84 ^{OT}	2–6	32 – Gillenwater	14 – Watson	2 – 3 Tied	Pan American Center (8,205); Las Cruces, New Mexico
12/11/2010*; 7:00 pm, The Mtn.		at New Mexico; Rio Grande Rivalry	L 62–78	2–7	21 – Kabongo	17 – Rahman	6 – Laroche	The Pit (15,920); Albuquerque, New Mexico
12/13/2010*; 7:00 pm		Arkansas–Pine Bluff	W 83–49	3–7	19 – Kabongo	9 – Dixon	5 – Laroche	Pan American Center (5,798); Las Cruces, New Mexico
12/16/2010*; 7:00 pm		Oklahoma Panhandle State	W 78–46	4–7	12 – Sy	7 – 3 Tied	4 – Watson	Pan American Center (4,837); Las Cruces, New Mexico
12/18/2010*; 7:00 pm, AggieVision		Pacific; Lou Henson Classic	W 69–64	5–7	17 – Castillo	7 – Nephawe	4 – Laroche/Watson	Pan American Center (5,488); Las Cruces, New Mexico
12/21/2010*; 7:00 pm		Louisiana–Lafayette	W 82–76	6–7	20 – Castillo	6 – Laroche	6 – Laroche	Pan American Center (5,081); Las Cruces, New Mexico
12/23/2010*; 7:00 pm		Saint Mary's	L 53–73	6–8	16 – Kabongo	7 – Watson	2 – 3 Tied	Pan American Center (5,681); Las Cruces, New Mexico
12/29/2010; 7:00 pm		at Idaho	W 74–69	7–8 (1–0)	22 – Gillenwater	7 – Gillenwater	6 – Laroche	Cowan Spectrum (503); Moscow, Idaho
12/31/2010; 5:00 pm		at Boise State	L 78–81	7–9 (1–1)	24 – Gillenwater	7 – Gillenwater	8 – Laroche	Taco Bell Arena (3,145); Boise, Idaho
01/08/2011; 7:00 pm, AggieVision		Fresno State	W 80–68	8–9 (2–1)	19 – Gillenwater	10 – Gillenwater	4 – Laroche	Pan American Center (5,547); Las Cruces, New Mexico
01/13/2011; 7:00 pm, ESPN+		Hawaii	W 82–64	9–9 (3–1)	13 – Laroche/Gillenwater	10 – Gillenwater	5 – Laroche	Pan American Center (5,522); Las Cruces, New Mexico
01/15/2011; 7:00 pm, AggieVision		San Jose State	W 78–53	10–9 (4–1)	18 – Gillenwater	10 – Nephawe	5 – Laroche	Pan American Center (5,581); Las Cruces, New Mexico
01/20/2011; 7:00 pm		at Nevada	L 71–90	10–10 (4–2)	22 – Gillenwater	7 – Sy	5 – Laroche	Lawlor Events Center (4,871); Reno, Nevada
01/22/2011; 9:00 pm, ESPNU		at Utah State	L 49–59	10–11 (4–3)	20 – Gillenwater	6 – Gillenwater/Nephawe	5 – Laroche	Smith Spectrum (10,013); Logan, Utah
01/27/2011; 5:00 pm		Boise State	W 96–87 ^{OT}	11–11 (5–3)	34 – Gillenwater	10 – Watson	5 – Laroche	Pan American Center (5,622); Las Cruces, New Mexico
01/29/2011; 7:30 pm		at Idaho	W 73–65	12–11 (6–3)	19 – Castillo	6 – Laroche	4 – Laroche/Kabongo	Pan American Center (5,721); Las Cruces, New Mexico
02/03/2011; 8:00 pm		at Fresno State	L 83–88 ^{OT}	12–12 (6–4)	33 – Gillenwater	8 – Gillenwater/Rahman	6 – Laroche	Save Mart Center (6,863); Fresno, California
02/07/2011; 7:00 pm, AggieVision		Louisiana Tech	W 75–57	13–12 (7–4)	19 – Gillenwater	7 – Nephawe	6 – Laroche	Pan American Center (5,084); Las Cruces, New Mexico
02/12/2011; 2:00 pm, ESPN+		at Louisiana Tech	W 75–57	14–12 (8–4)	14 – Rahman	6 – Kabongo/West	3 – Laroche/West	Thomas Assembly Center (2,399); Ruston, Louisiana
02/19/2011*; 6:30 pm		Northern Colorado; ESPN BracketBusters	L 80–82	14–13	19 – Laroche	5 – 3 Tied	6 – Laroche	Pan American Center (5,244); Las Cruces, New Mexico
02/23/2011; 9:00 pm, ESPN2		at San Jose State	L 70–72 ^{OT}	14–14 (8–5)	18 – Gillenwater	8 – Gillenwater	9 – Laroche	Event Center Arena (5,581); San Jose, California
02/26/2011; 10:00 pm, AggieVision		at Hawai'i	L 70–76	14–15 (8–6)	22 – Kabongo	6 – Gillenwater	3 – Laroche/Kabongo	Stan Sheriff Center (8,148); Honolulu, HI
03/02/2011; 9:00 pm, ESPN2		No. 25 Utah State	L 54–58	14–16 (8–7)	17 – Gillenwater	10 – Nephawe	4 – Laroche	Pan American Center (6,602); Las Cruces, New Mexico
03/05/2011; 7:00 pm, AggieVision		Nevada	W 77–68	15–16 (8–8)	21 – Gillenwater	10 – Castillo	4 – Laroche	Pan American Center (6,177); Las Cruces, New Mexico
2011 WAC Men's Basketball Tournament
03/10/2011; 3:30 pm, ESPNU		vs. Nevada; Quarterfinals	W 66–60	16–16	18 – Gillenwater	6 – Kabongo	4 – Kabongo	Orleans Arena (2,958); Paradise, Nevada
03/11/2011; 10:00 pm, ESPN2		vs. Boise State; Semifinals	L 63–81	16–17	15 – Watson	5 – Watson/Laroche	8 – Kabongo	Orleans Arena (N/A); Paradise, Nevada
*Non-conference game. ^{#}Rankings from AP Poll. (#) Tournament seedings in parentheses.
