= 2010–11 Idaho Vandals men's basketball team =

American college basketball season

2010–11 Idaho Vandals men's basketball

CIT, First Round
- Conference: Western Athletic Conference
- Record: 18–14 (9–7 WAC)
- Head coach: Don Verlin
- Assistant coaches: Ray Lopes; Mike Freeman; Tim Murphy
- Home arena: Cowan Spectrum, Memorial Gym

2010–11 WAC men's basketball standings
	Conf.				Overall
Team	W		L	PCT	W		L	PCT
No. 19 Utah State †	15	–	1	.938	30	–	4	.882
Boise State	10	–	6	.625	22	–	13	.629
New Mexico State	9	–	7	.563	16	–	17	.485
Idaho	9	–	7	.563	18	–	14	.563
Hawaii	8	–	8	.500	19	–	13	.594
Nevada	8	–	8	.500	13	–	19	.406
Fresno State	6	–	10	.375	14	–	17	.452
San Jose State	5	–	11	.313	17	–	16	.515
Louisiana Tech	2	–	14	.125	12	–	20	.375
† 2011 WAC tournament winner Rankings from AP Poll

The 2010–11 Idaho Vandals men's basketball team represented the University of Idaho during the 2010–11 NCAA Division I men's basketball season. The team played the first part of their season at Memorial Gym while waiting for the football season to end, and then played at the Cowan Spectrum in Moscow, Idaho. They were members of the Western Athletic Conference and were led by third-year head coach Don Verlin. They finished the season 18–14, 9–7 in WAC play. They lost in the quarterfinals of the 2011 WAC men's basketball tournament to San Jose State. They were invited to the 2011 CollegeInsider.com Tournament, where they lost in the first round to San Francisco.

== Roster ==
Name	Number	Position	Height	Weight	Year	Hometown
Djim Bandoumel	22	Forward	6–8	215	Junior	Quebec City, Quebec, Canada
Kyle Barone	33	Center	6–10	220	Sophomore	Garden Grove, California
Matt Borton	20	Guard	6–5	180	Freshman	Yakima, Washington
Deremy Geiger	25	Guard	5–11	170	Junior	Las Vegas, Nevada
Shawn Henderson	3	Guard	6–3	178	Senior	Renton, Washington
Paul Jorg	12	Forward	6–8	200	Freshman	Bothell, Washington
Joe Kammerer	42	Center	6–9	195	Redshirt Freshman	Eugene, Oregon
Jeff Ledbetter	2	Guard	6–3	195	Senior	Brea, California
Stephen Madison	34	Forward	6–5	215	Junior	Portland, Oregon
Sheridan Shayne	4	Guard	6–0	170	Junior	Boise, Idaho
Landon Tatum	10	Guard	5–11	196	Junior	San Antonio, Texas
Luiz Toledo	21	Forward	6–8	225	Junior	Araraquara, Brazil
Brandon Wiley	11	Forward	6–6	218	Senior	Pinole, California

== Schedule ==
Date time, TV	Rank^{#}	Opponent^{#}	Result	Record	Site (attendance) city, state
Regular Season
11/13/2010*; 8:00 pm		Eastern Oregon	W 86–74	1–0	Memorial Gym (1,320); Moscow, Idaho
11/16/2010*; 7:00 pm		at Washington State; Battle of the Palouse	L 71–88	1–1	Beasley Coliseum (6,024); Pullman, Washington
11/20/2010*; 7:05 pm		Portland	L 53–66	1–2	Memorial Gym (598); Moscow, Idaho
11/22/2010*; 6:05 pm		at Montana	L 33–75	1–3	Dahlberg Arena (2,530); Missoula, Montana
11/27/2010*; 3:05 pm		at Eastern Washington	L 60–70	2–3	Reese Court (1,001); Cheney, Washington
12/03/2010*; 8:00 pm		North Dakota; BTI Classic	W 63–42	3–3	Memorial Gym (613); Moscow, Idaho
12/04/2010*; 8:00 pm		Monmouth; BTI Classic	W 69–66	4–3	Memorial Gym (986); Moscow, Idaho
12/05/2010*; 6:00 pm		Eastern Michigan; BTI Classic	W 75–60	5–3	Memorial Gym (417); Moscow, Idaho
12/11/2010*; 5:00 pm, FSNNW		at Seattle	L 56–66	5–4	KeyArena (3,976); Seattle, Washington
12/18/2010*; 7:05 pm		Montana	L 63–64	5–5	Cowan Spectrum (922); Moscow, Idaho
December 21, 2010*; 7:00 p.m.		at Oregon	W 69–65	6–5	McArthur Court (6,635); Eugene, Oregon
December 29, 2010; 7:00 p.m.		New Mexico State	L 69–74	6–6 (0–1)	Cowan Spectrum (503); Moscow, Idaho
December 31, 2010; 7:00 p.m.		Louisiana Tech	W 77–47	7–6 (1–1)	Cowan Spectrum (511); Moscow, Idaho
January 6, 2011; 9:30 p.m.		at Hawaii	W 59–44	8–6 (2–1)	Stan Sheriff Center (5,605); Honolulu, Hawaii
January 8, 2011; 7:30 p.m.		at San Jose State	W 75–67	9–6 (3–1)	Event Center Arena (1,826); San Jose, California
January 12, 2011; 8:00 p.m., ESPN2		Nevada	W 72–67	10–6 (4–1)	Cowan Spectrum (1,550); Moscow, Idaho
January 15, 2011*; 7:00 p.m.		at Cal State Bakersfield	W 78–77 ^{OT}	11–6	Rabobank Arena (1,589); Bakersfield, California
January 17, 2011; 7:00 p.m.		at Fresno State	W 67–57	12–6 (5–1)	Save Mart Center (6,998); Fresno, California
January 22, 2011; 7:00 p.m., WAC Sports Network		Boise State; Rivalry	L 67–70	12–7 (5–2)	Cowan Spectrum (5,016); Moscow, Idaho
January 27, 2011; 5:00 p.m., ESPN Plus		at Louisiana Tech	L 56–71	12–8 (5–3)	Thomas Assembly Center (1,830); Ruston, Louisiana
January 29, 2011; 6:00 p.m.		at New Mexico State	L 65–73	12–9 (5–4)	Pan American Center (5,721); Las Cruces, New Mexico
February 3, 2011; 7:00 p.m.		San Jose State	L 89–92 ^{2OT}	12–10 (5–5)	Cowan Spectrum (1,088); Moscow, Idaho
February 5, 2011; 7:00 p.m.		Hawaii	W 75–61	13–10 (6–5)	Cowan Spectrum (1,191); Moscow, Idaho
February 9, 2011; 8:00 p.m., ESPN2		No. 21 Utah State	W 64–56	14–10 (7–5)	Cowan Spectrum (1,512); Moscow, Idaho
February 12, 2011; 8:00 p.m., ESPNU		at Boise State; Rivalry	L 63–69	14–11 (7–6)	Taco Bell Arena (12,193); Boise, Idaho
February 19, 2011*; 6:05 pm		at Montana State; ESPN BracketBusters	W 65–50	15–11	Worthington Arena (2,941); Bozeman, Montana
February 24, 2011; 7:30 p.m., ESPN Plus		at Nevada	W 67–59	16–11 (8–6)	Lawlor Events Center (4,578); Reno, Nevada
February 26, 2011; 6:00 p.m.		at Utah State	L 68–84	16–12 (8–7)	Smith Spectrum (10,270); Logan, Utah
March 3, 2011; 7:00 p.m., WAC Sports Network		Fresno State	W 69–66	17–12 (9–7)	Cowan Spectrum (2,046); Moscow, Idaho
March 5, 2011*; 7:00 p.m.		Seattle	W 78–69	18–12	Cowan Spectrum (2,109); Moscow, Idaho
WAC tournament
March 10, 2011; 12:00 p.m., ESPNU	(4)	vs. (8) San Jose State; Quarterfinals	L 68–74	18–13	Orleans Arena; Paradise, Nevada
CollegeInsider.com Tournament
March 16, 2011*; 7:00 p.m.		at San Francisco; CIT First Round	L 73–81	18–14	War Memorial Gymnasium (1,879); San Francisco, California
*Non-conference game. ^{#}Rankings from AP Poll. (#) Tournament seedings in parentheses. All times are in Pacific Time.
