= 2010–11 San Jose State Spartans men's basketball team =

American college basketball season

2010–11 San Jose State Spartans men's basketball

CBI First Round vs. Creighton, L, 85–74
- Conference: Western Athletic Conference
- Record: 17–16 (5–11 WAC)
- Head coach: George Nessman (6th season)
- Assistant coaches: Brent Davis (6th season); Talvin Hester (1st season); Donald Williams (8th season)
- Home arena: Event Center Arena

2010–11 WAC men's basketball standings
	Conf.				Overall
Team	W		L	PCT	W		L	PCT
No. 19 Utah State †	15	–	1	.938	30	–	4	.882
Boise State	10	–	6	.625	22	–	13	.629
New Mexico State	9	–	7	.563	16	–	17	.485
Idaho	9	–	7	.563	18	–	14	.563
Hawaii	8	–	8	.500	19	–	13	.594
Nevada	8	–	8	.500	13	–	19	.406
Fresno State	6	–	10	.375	14	–	17	.452
San Jose State	5	–	11	.313	17	–	16	.515
Louisiana Tech	2	–	14	.125	12	–	20	.375
† 2011 WAC tournament winner Rankings from AP Poll

The 2010–11 San Jose State Spartans men's basketball team represented San Jose State University during the 2010–11 NCAA Division I men's basketball season. The Spartans, led by sixth-year head coach George Nessman, played their home games at the Event Center Arena and were members of the Western Athletic Conference. They finished the season 17–16, 5–11 in WAC play, to finish eighth in the conference. However, San Jose State upset Idaho and Hawaii in the WAC tournament before losing the semifinal round to Utah State and earned an invitation to the College Basketball Invitational for San Jose State's first postseason appearance since making the 1996 NCAA tournament.

== Preseason roster changes ==
=== Departures ===
Name	Number	Pos.	Height	Weight	Year	Hometown	Reason
Anthony Dixon	35	G	6'5"	195	Freshman	Chicago, IL	Transferred to West Valley CC
Chris Oakes	30	C	6'10"	235	Senior	Oakland, CA	Graduated
Robert Owens	23	G	6'3"	195	Senior	Oakland, CA	Graduated
Mac Peterson	33	G	6'3"	195	Senior	Antioch, CA	Graduated
Kyle Thomas	4	F	6'8"	225	Sophomore	Folsom, CA	Left the team
C. J. Webster	52	F	6'9"	255	Junior	Missouri City, TX	Declared for NBA draft
Jerrelle Wilson	52	G	6'1"	200	Senior	San Francisco, CA	Graduated

=== Incoming transfers ===
Name	Number	Pos.	Height	Weight	Year	Hometown	Previous School
Wil Carter	15	G	6'8"	215	Junior	Pocatello, ID	Salt Lake CC
Billy Dick	10	F	6'6"	235	Junior	San Jose, CA	San Jose CC
Calvin Douglas	5	G	6'3"	215	Junior	Antioch, CA	CC of San Francisco
Brylle Kamen	24	F	6'7"	235	Sophomore	Paris, France	Western Nebraska CC

== Roster ==
2010–11 San Jose State Spartans men's basketball team
Players
Coaches

Pos.	#	Name	Height	Weight	Year	Previous school	Hometown
G	1	Keith Shamburger	5 ft 11 in (1.8 m)	170 lb (77 kg)	Fr	Lutheran HS of San Diego	Lakewood, CA
G	2	Adrian Oliver	6 ft 4 in (1.93 m)	210 lb (95 kg)	RS Sr	U. of Washington	Modesto, CA
G	4	Aalim Moor	6 ft 3 in (1.91 m)	194 lb (88 kg)	So	Saint Mary's College HS	Oakland, CA
G	5	Calvin Douglas	6 ft 3 in (1.91 m)	215 lb (98 kg)	Jr	CC of San Francisco	Antioch, CA
F	10	Billy Dick	6 ft 6 in (1.98 m)	235 lb (107 kg)	Jr	San Jose CC	San Jose, CA
F	15	Wil Carter	6 ft 8 in (2.03 m)	215 lb (98 kg)	Jr	Salt Lake CC	Pocatello, ID
G/F	23	Chris Jones	6 ft 4 in (1.93 m)	205 lb (93 kg)	So	Newark Memorial HS	Hayward, CA
F	24	Brylle Kamen	6 ft 7 in (2.01 m)	235 lb (107 kg)	So	Western Nebraska CC	Paris, France
C	32	Joe Henson	6 ft 8 in (2.03 m)	245 lb (111 kg)	So	Pasadena HS	Pasadena, CA
G	33	Justin Graham	6 ft 4 in (1.93 m)	205 lb (93 kg)	RS Sr	Ripon HS	Ripon, CA
G	42	D.J. Brown (redshirt)	6 ft 2 in (1.88 m)	165 lb (75 kg)	Fr	Chino Hills HS	Los Angeles, CA
G	44	Jerry Casey (W)	6 ft 8 in (2.03 m)	195 lb (88 kg)	So	Mission College Prep	San Luis Obispo, CA
F	50	Garrett Ton (W)	6 ft 8 in (2.03 m)	222 lb (101 kg)	RS Jr	Torrance West HS	Torrance, CA
C	52	Matt Ballard	6 ft 9 in (2.06 m)	220 lb (100 kg)	Jr	Irvine Valley CC	Foothill Ranch, CA

Head coach

George Nessman (California)

Assistant coach(es)

Brent Davis (San Diego State)
Talvin Hester (Texas Wesleyan)
Donald Williams (Cal State Hayward)

Legend

- (C) Team captain
- (S) Suspended
- (I) Ineligible
- (W) Walk-on
- Injured
- Current redshirt

Roster

== Schedule ==
Date time, TV	Rank^{#}	Opponent^{#}	Result	Record	Site (attendance) city, state
Exhibition
November 6, 2010*; 3:00 pm		Whitman	W 109–92	—	Event Center Arena; San Jose, CA
Regular Season
November 12, 2010*; 5:35 pm		at Eastern Washington	W 67–60	1–0	Reese Court (1,357); Cheney, WA
November 17, 2010*; 7:00 pm		San Francisco	W 74–64	2–0	Event Center Arena (2,116); San Jose, CA
November 20, 2010*; 2:05 pm		at Oregon	W 75–72	3–0	McArthur Court (7,352); Eugene, OR
November 24, 2010*; 7:00 pm		at Cal State Bakersfield	L 77–82	3–1	Icardo Center (1,335); Bakersfield, CA
November 28, 2010*; 2:00 pm		UC Riverside	W 80–77	4–1	Event Center Arena (1,133); San Jose, CA
November 30, 2010*; 5:00 pm		at UTSA	L 63–72	4–2	Convocation Center (1,434); San Antonio, TX
December 4, 2010*; 7:00 pm		at UC Irvine	W 85–70	5–2	Bren Events Center (1,347); Irvine, CA
December 10, 2010*; 7:00 pm		Santa Clara; Clash of the County	L 63–67	5–3	Event Center Arena (3,411); San Jose, CA
December 12, 2010*; 7:00 pm		Eastern Washington	W 70–69	6–3	Event Center Arena (1,253); San Jose, CA
December 18, 2010*; 7:10 pm		at Seattle	W 86–70	7–3	KeyArena (3,619); Seattle, WA
December 22, 2010*; 7:00 pm		Puget Sound	W 95–62	8–3	Event Center Arena (1,377); San Jose, CA
December 29, 2010; 7:00 pm		at Fresno State; Rivalry	L 62–75	8–4 (0–1)	Save Mart Center (6,995); Fresno, CA
December 31, 2010; 5:05 pm		at Utah State	L 71–80	8–5 (0–2)	Smith Spectrum (6,732); Logan, UT
January 6, 2011; 7:00 pm		Boise State	L 101–102 ^{4OT}	8–6 (0–3)	Event Center Arena (1,684); San Jose, CA
January 8, 2011; 7:00 pm		Idaho	L 67–75	8–7 (0–4)	Event Center Arena (1,286); San Jose, CA
January 13, 2011; 5:00 pm		at Louisiana Tech	W 79–74	9–7 (1–4)	Thomas Assembly Center (1,905); Ruston, LA
January 15, 2011; 6:00 pm		at New Mexico State	L 53–78	9–8 (1–5)	Pan American Center (5,581); Las Cruces, NM
January 22, 2011; 9:00 pm		at Hawaii	L 61–67	9–9 (1–6)	Stan Sheriff Center (6,236); Honolulu, HI
January 27, 2011; 7:00 pm		Utah State	L 65–84	9–10 (1–7)	Event Center Arena (2,391); San Jose, CA
January 29, 2011; 7:00 pm		Fresno State; Rivalry	W 78–66	10–10 (2–7)	Event Center Arena (2,545); San Jose, CA
February 3, 2011; 6:05 pm		Idaho	W 92–89 ^{OT}	11–10 (3–7)	Cowan Spectrum (1,088); Moscow, ID
February 5, 2011; 7:35 pm		at Nevada	L 69–89	11–11 (3–8)	Lawlor Events Center (4,946); Reno, NV
February 12, 2011; 7:00 pm		Nevada	L 76–84 ^{OT}	11–12 (3–9)	Event Center Arena (1,544); San Jose, CA
February 15, 2011*; 7:00 pm		Montana State	W 77–74	12–12	Event Center Arena (1,160); San Jose, CA
February 18, 2011*; 7:00 pm		Weber State	W 62–46	13–12	Event Center Arena (1,243); San Jose, CA
February 23, 2011; 8:00 pm		New Mexico State	W 72–70	14–12 (4–9)	Event Center Arena (2,159); San Jose, CA
February 26, 2011; 7:00 pm		Louisiana Tech	W 72–60	15–12 (5–9)	Event Center Arena (1,879); San Jose, CA
March 3, 2011; 7:30 pm		Hawaii	L 71–77	15–13 (5–10)	Event Center Arena (2,823); San Jose, CA
March 5, 2011; 6:05 pm		Boise State	L 51–66	15–14 (5–11)	Taco Bell Arena (6,286); Boise, ID
WAC tournament
March 9, 2011; 12:00 pm	(8)	vs. (5) Hawaii; WAC First round	W 75–74	16–14	Orleans Arena (2,814); Paradise, NV
March 10, 2011; 12:00 pm	(8)	vs. (4) Idaho; WAC Quarterfinals	W 74–68	17–14	Orleans Arena (2,985); Paradise, NV
March 11, 2011; 12:00 pm	(8)	vs. (1) No. 23 Utah State; WAC Semifinals	L 54–58	17–15	Orleans Arena (2,985); Paradise, NV
CBI
March 15, 2011; 5:05 pm		at Creighton; CBI First round	L 74–85	17–16	Qwest Center Omaha (3,086); Omaha, NE
*Non-conference game. ^{#}Rankings from AP Poll. (#) Tournament seedings in parentheses. All times are in Pacific Time.
