= 2011 WAC men's basketball tournament =

- 2011 WAC Tournament logo
- Classification: Division I
- Season: 2010–11
- Teams: 8
- Site: Orleans Arena; Paradise, NV
- Champions: Utah State (2nd title)
- Winning coach: Stew Morrill (2nd title)
- Television: ESPNU/ESPN2

2010–11 WAC men's basketball standings
	Conf.				Overall
Team	W		L	PCT	W		L	PCT
No. 19 Utah State †	15	–	1	.938	30	–	4	.882
Boise State	10	–	6	.625	22	–	13	.629
New Mexico State	9	–	7	.563	16	–	17	.485
Idaho	9	–	7	.563	18	–	14	.563
Hawaii	8	–	8	.500	19	–	13	.594
Nevada	8	–	8	.500	13	–	19	.406
Fresno State	6	–	10	.375	14	–	17	.452
San Jose State	5	–	11	.313	17	–	16	.515
Louisiana Tech	2	–	14	.125	12	–	20	.375
† 2011 WAC tournament winner Rankings from AP Poll

The 2011 WAC men's basketball tournament was held March 9–12 at the Orleans Arena in Paradise, Nevada to crown a champion of the Western Athletic Conference. The tournament was won by Utah State for their 2nd WAC tournament title to earn an automatic bid to the 2011 NCAA Men's Division I Basketball Tournament.

== Format ==
The 2011 WAC Men's Basketball Tournament followed a single-elimination format with the following structure:

1. Teams: A total of 8 teams participated in the tournament, with the top eight teams in the Western Athletic Conference (WAC) qualifying.

2. Seeding:

- The tournament was seeded based on regular-season performance. The top two seeds (Utah State and Nevada) received byes into the semifinals.
- The third and fourth seeds received byes into the quarterfinals.
- The remaining four teams played in the first round (the 5th through 8th seeds).

3. First Round:

- The 5th seed played the 8th seed, and the 6th seed played the 7th seed.

4. Quarterfinals:

- The winners from the first round faced the third and fourth seeds.

5. Semifinals:

- The top two seeds (Utah State and Nevada) advanced directly to the semifinals and played against the winners of the quarterfinals.

6. Championship Game:

- The winners of the semifinals met in the final game to compete for the tournament title.

Results:

- Final Score: Utah State won 77–69 against Boise State in the championship game, claiming the 2011 WAC Tournament title.

The top eight teams in the conference qualified for the tournament. The top two seeds received byes into the semi-finals while the 3 and 4 seeds received byes into the quarter-finals. The two quarter-finals games were broadcast on ESPNU. The semi-final involving the 2 seed and the championship game was broadcast by ESPN2.

== Bracket ==
All Times Pacific. Rankings from the AP Poll.

First round Wednesday, March 9
5	Hawaii	74
8	San Jose State	75
6	Nevada	90
7	Fresno State	80

Quarterfinals; Thursday, March 10
8	San Jose State	74
4	Idaho	68
6	Nevada	60
3	New Mexico State	66

Semifinals; Friday, March 11
8	San Jose State	54
1	#23 Utah State	58
3	New Mexico State	63
2	Boise State	81

Championship; Saturday, March 12
1	#23 Utah State	77
2	Boise State	69
