= Derek Waugh =

Current position
- Title: Athletic Director
- Team: Dalton State College

Biographical details
- Born: October 13, 1971 (age 55); Atlanta, Georgia, U.S.

Playing career
- 1989–1993: Furman

Coaching career (HC unless noted)
- 1997–2000: Stetson (asst.)
- 2000–2011: Stetson

Derek Waugh (born October 13, 1971) came to Dalton State in 2012 as athletic director to start up the school's first four-year intercollegiate athletic program. Prior to coming to Dalton, Waugh was an assistant athletic director at Stetson University in DeLand, Florida. He spent most of his time at Stetson as the head men's basketball coach, where he took over the program in 2000 at the age of 29, which made him the youngest division I head coach in the country, and finished his career second in program history in all-time wins in 2011. He also ranks third all-time in wins in the Atlantic Sun Conference.

Prior to his career in athletics, Waugh was an attorney in Atlanta. He attended law school at Wake Forest and completed his undergraduate degree at Furman University, where he was a first team all-conference basketball player and a GTE Division I Academic All-American in 1993.

== College achievements ==
Throughout his career as a student athlete, he had several titles and accomplishments. He was awarded Southern Conference Freshman of the Year in 1990. Waugh helped lead the Furman program to its only Southern Conference Championship in the past 34 years in 1991. He was named GTE Division 1 Academic All-American and named First Team All-Southern Conference in 1993. Waugh graduated Furman as one of only four players to score 1,400 points and grab 800 rebounds in his career. Furman honored him as their Young Alumnus of the Year in 2000.

== Coaching career ==
Waugh started his career as an attorney at the Atlanta firm of Schreeder, Wheeler and Flint. Soon after, Waugh was offered the position of head coach at Stetson University in Florida after the retirement of coach Murray Arnold. In 2012, Waugh was hired as the athletic director at Dalton State College.
