= B. J. Hill =

B. J. Hill may refer to:

- B. J. Hill (basketball) (born 1973), American college basketball coach
- B. J. Hill (American football) (born 1995), American football defensive tackle
