= 2010–11 Northern Colorado Bears men's basketball team =

American college basketball season

2010–11 Northern Colorado Bears men's basketball
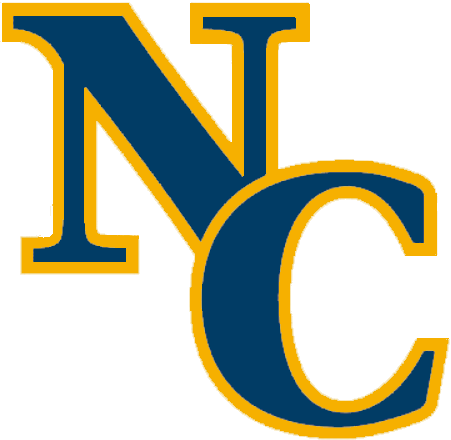

Big Sky Regular Season and tournament champions

NCAA Tournament, Round of 64
- Conference: Big Sky Conference
- Record: 0–11, 21 wins vacated (0–3 Big Sky, 13 wins vacated)
- Head coach: B. J. Hill
- Assistant coaches: Shawn Ellis; Chris Craig; Ryan Martin
- Home arena: Butler–Hancock Sports Pavilion

2010–11 Big Sky men's basketball standings
	Conf.				Overall
Team	W		L	PCT	W		L	PCT
Northern Colorado †	13	–	3	.813	21	–	11	.656
Montana	12	–	4	.750	21	–	11	.656
Weber State	11	–	5	.688	18	–	14	.563
Northern Arizona	9	–	7	.563	19	–	13	.594
Montana State	7	–	9	.438	13	–	18	.419
Eastern Washington	7	–	9	.438	10	–	20	.333
Portland State	5	–	11	.313	14	–	16	.467
Idaho State	4	–	12	.250	9	–	20	.310
Sacramento State	4	–	12	.250	7	–	21	.250
† Conference tournament winner

The 2010–11 Northern Colorado Bears men's basketball team represented Northern Colorado University during the 2010–11 NCAA Division I men's basketball season. The Bears, led by first year head coach B. J. Hill, played their home games at the Butler–Hancock Sports Pavilion and are members of the Big Sky Conference. They finished the season 21–11, 13–3 in Big Sky play to capture the Big Sky regular season championship. They also won the 2011 Big Sky Conference men's basketball tournament to receive an automatic bid in the 2011 NCAA Division I men's basketball tournament, their first tournament bid in school history. In the tournament, they lost in the second round to San Diego State. However, they were forced to vacate their season and tournament results due to academic fraud and recruiting violations.

== Roster ==
Number	Name	Position	Height	Weight	Year	Hometown
0	Emmanuel Addo	Forward/Center	6–8	220	Freshman	Northfield, Minnesota
1	Xzaivier James	Guard	5–9	160	Freshman	Greeley, Colorado
2	Lee Hall	Guard	5–9	155	Junior	Denver, Colorado
3	Paul Garnica	Guard	6–0	160	Freshman	San Antonio, Texas
4	Kevin Hanes	Center	6–10	220	Sophomore	Monument, Colorado
5	Tevin Svihovec	Guard	6–2	200	Freshman	Kingwood, Texas
10	Chris Kaba	Forward	6–8	190	Senior	Gary, Indiana
11	Elliott Lloyd	Guard	6–4	165	Sophomore	Houston, Texas
15	Tat Unruh	Guard	6–4	170	Freshman	Branson, Missouri
23	Mike Bedford	Guard/Forward	6–4	185	Sophomore	Plano, Texas
31	Dave Arnold	Guard	6–3	200	Sophomore	Highlands Ranch, Colorado
32	Devon Beitzel	Guard	6–1	180	Senior	Lafayette, Colorado
33	Neal Kingman	Forward	6–7	220	Senior	Greeley, Colorado
34	Connor Osborne	Center	6–9	250	Sophomore	Littleton, Colorado
41	Mike Proctor	Forward/Center	6–8	225	Junior	Phoenix, Arizona
44	Taylor Montgomery	Forward/Center	6–7	245	Senior	Aurora, Colorado

== Schedule ==
Date time, TV	Rank^{#}	Opponent^{#}	Result	Record	Site (attendance) city, state
Exhibition
11/01/2010*; 7:05 pm		Western State	W 93–61	–	Butler–Hancock Sports Pavilion (1,276); Greeley, CO
Regular season
11/12/2010*; 7:05 pm		Tabor	W 93–52	1–0	Butler–Hancock Sports Pavilion (2,063); Greeley, CO
11/16/2010*; 7:05 pm		Wyoming	W 67–53	2–0	Butler–Hancock Sports Pavilion (2,051); Greeley, CO
11/16/2010*; 3:00 pm, FSAZ		at Arizona; Las Vegas Invitational	L 70–93	2–1	McKale Center (12,057); Tucson, AZ
11/23/2010*; 7:00 pm		at Santa Clara; Las Vegas Invitational	L 84–87	2–2	Leavey Center (1,249); Santa Clara, CA
11/26/2010*; 7:00 pm		vs. Valparaiso; Las Vegas Invitational	L 61–76	2–3	Orleans Arena (4,010); Paradise, NV
11/27/2010*; 7:00 pm		vs. Bethune–Cookman; Las Vegas Invitational	W 69–45	3–3	Orleans Arena (5,120); Paradise, NV
12/04/2010*; 7:35 pm		Black Hills State	W 84–52	4–3	Butler–Hancock Sports Pavilion (2,056); Greeley, CO
12/12/2010*; 4:00 pm, BTN		at No. 16 Illinois	L 76–86	4–4	Assembly Hall (14,814); Champaign, IL
12/18/2010*; 5:30 pm, FSNRM		at Denver	L 68–71	4–5	Magness Arena (3,460); Denver, CO
12/20/2010*; 7:00 pm		at Colorado State	L 61–75	4–6	Moby Arena (4,680); Fort Collins, CO
12/22/2010*; 7:00 pm		at Louisiana–Monroe	L 75–78	4–7	Fant–Ewing Coliseum (775); Monroe, LA
12/29/2010; 7:05 pm		at Portland State	W 79–66	5–7 (1–0)	Peter Stott Center (823); Portland, OR
12/31/2010; 3:05 pm		at Eastern Washington	W 75–73	6–7 (2–0)	Reese Court (1,001); Cheney, WA
01/06/2011; 7:05 pm		Montana	W 63–45	7–7 (3–0)	Butler–Hancock Sports Pavilion (1,115); Greeley, CO
01/08/2011; 7:05 pm, Altitude		Montana State	W 72–58	8–7 (4–0)	Butler–Hancock Sports Pavilion (1,897); Greeley, CO
01/13/2011; 7:25 pm		Idaho State	W 57–37	9–7 (5–0)	Butler–Hancock Sports Pavilion (2,513); Greeley, CO
01/20/2011; 7:05 pm		at Sacramento State	W 77–72	10–7 (6–0)	Colberg Court (429); Sacramento, CA
01/22/2011; 7:05 pm		Weber State	W 65–46	11–7 (7–0)	Butler–Hancock Sports Pavilion (2,299); Greeley, CO
01/29/2011; 7:00 pm, Altitude		at Weber State	L 71–72	11–8 (7–1)	Dee Events Center (7,505); Ogden, UT
01/31/2011; 6:37 pm		at Northern Arizona	L 54–65	11–9 (7–2)	Walkup Skydome (722); Flagstaff, AZ
02/03/2011; 7:05 pm		Eastern Washington	W 63–53	12–9 (8–2)	Butler–Hancock Sports Pavilion (1,556); Greeley, CO
02/05/2011; 7:05 pm		Portland State	W 85–72	13–9 (9–2)	Butler–Hancock Sports Pavilion (2,222); Greeley, CO
02/10/2011; 7:05 pm		at Montana State	W 85–72	14–9 (10–2)	Worthington Arena (3,157); Bozeman, MT
02/12/2011; 7:05 pm		at Montana	L 42–55	14–10 (10–3)	Dahlberg Arena (6,542); Missoula, MT
02/19/2011*; 6:30 pm, Altitude2		at New Mexico State; ESPN BracketBusters	W 82–80	15–10	Pan American Center (5,244); Las Cruces, NM
02/21/2011*; 7:05 pm		North Dakota	W 87–69	16–10	Butler–Hancock Sports Pavilion (1,931); Greeley, CO
02/26/2011; 7:05 pm		Northern Arizona	W 72–71	17–10 (11–3)	Butler–Hancock Sports Pavilion (2,755); Greeley, CO
02/28/2011; 7:05 pm		at Idaho State	W 77–74	18–10 (12–3)	Holt Arena (1,983); Pocatello, ID
03/02/2011; 7:10 pm		Sacramento State	W 84–54	19–10 (13–3)	Butler–Hancock Sports Pavilion (3,012); Greeley, CO
Big Sky tournament
3/8/11; 8:00 pm, Altitude		Northern Arizona; Semifinals	W 73–70	20–10	Butler–Hancock Sports Pavilion (3,003); Greeley, CO
3/9/11; 7:00 pm, ESPN2		Montana; Championship Game	W 65–60	21–10	Butler–Hancock Sports Pavilion (3,182); Greeley, CO
NCAA tournament
3/17/2011*; 2:40 pm, TNT	(15 W)	vs. (2 W) No. 6 San Diego State; Second Round	L 50–68	21–11	McKale Center (10,101); Tucson, AZ
*Non-conference game. ^{#}Rankings from AP Poll. (#) Tournament seedings in parentheses. W=NCAA West Regional. All times are in Mountain Time.
