= 2010–11 Santa Clara Broncos men's basketball team =

American college basketball season

2010–11 Santa Clara Broncos men's basketball
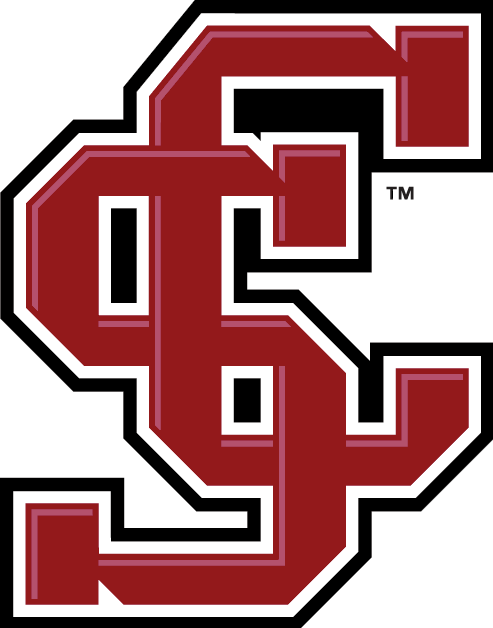

CollegeInsider.com tournament champions
- Conference: West Coast Conference
- Record: 24–14 (8–6 WCC)
- Head coach: Kerry Keating
- Assistant coaches: Dustin Kerns; Sam Scholl; James Ware
- Home arena: Leavey Center

2010–11 West Coast Conference men's basketball standings
	Conf.				Overall
Team	W		L	PCT	W		L	PCT
Saint Mary's	11	–	3	.786	25	–	9	.735
† Gonzaga	11	–	3	.786	25	–	10	.714
San Francisco	10	–	4	.714	19	–	15	.559
Santa Clara	8	–	6	.571	24	–	14	.632
Portland	7	–	7	.500	20	–	12	.625
Pepperdine	5	–	9	.357	12	–	21	.364
Loyola Marymount	2	–	12	.143	11	–	21	.344
San Diego	2	–	12	.143	6	–	24	.200
† 2011 WCC tournament winner As of March 30, 2011; Rankings from AP Poll

The 2010–11 Santa Clara Broncos men's basketball team represented Santa Clara University during the 2010–11 NCAA Division I men's basketball season. The Broncos, led by fourth-year head coach Kerry Keating, played their home games at the Leavey Center and are members of the West Coast Conference. They finished the season 24–14, 8–6 in WCC play and lost in the semifinals of the 2011 West Coast Conference men's basketball tournament to Saint Mary's. They were invited to and were champions of the 2011 CollegeInsider.com Tournament.

== Roster ==
Number	Name	Position	Height	Weight	Year	Hometown
0	Evan Roquemore	Guard	6–3	165	Freshman	Henderson, Nevada
1	Troy Payne	Forward	6–6	210	Senior	Los Angeles, California
3	Chris Cunningham	Forward	6–8	230	Sophomore	Pomona, California
4	Kyle Perricone	Guard	6–3	195	Sophomore	Palo Alto, California
10	Ben Dowdell	Forward	6–7	225	Senior	North Nowra, New South Wales, Australia
13	Michael Santos	Guard	6–3	205	Senior	Occidental, California
14	Beau Gamble	Guard	6–0	185	Freshman	Boulder, Colorado
15	Marc Trasolini	Forward	6–9	235	Junior	Vancouver, British Columbia, Canada
21	Kevin Foster	Guard	6–2	219	Sohpomore	Katy, Texas
22	Nate Mensah	Guard	6–3	195	Senior	Salt Lake City, Utah
24	Julian Clarke	Guard	6–3	192	Freshman	Toronto, Ontario, Canada
25	John McArthur	Forward	6–9	225	Freshman	Danville, California
31	Niyi Harrison	Forward	6–7	220	Sophomore	Milpitas, California
33	Phillip Bach	Guard	6–4	195	Junior	Medina, Washington
42	Raymond Cowels III	Forward	6–4	205	Sophomore	Minneapolis, Minnesota
44	Yannick Atanga	Forward	6–8	210	Freshman	Yaoundé, Cameroon

== Schedule ==
Date time, TV	Rank^{#}	Opponent^{#}	Result	Record	Site (attendance) city, state
Exhibition
11/05/2010*; 6:00 pm		California Maritime	W 95–59	—	Leavey Center; Santa Clara, CA
Regular season
11/12/2010*; 6:00 pm		Cal State Bakersfield	W 82–77	1–0	Leavey Center (1,788); Santa Clara, CA
11/15/2010*; 7:30 pm		at USC	L 73–86	1–1	Galen Center; Los Angeles, CA
11/18/2010*; 7:00 pm		Rice	W 66–65	2–1	Leavey Center (1,312); Santa Clara, CA
11/21/2010*; 7:00 pm		Bethune–Cookman; Las Vegas Invitational	W 75–61	3–1	Leavey Center (1,217); Santa Clara, CA
11/23/2010*; 7:00 pm		Northern Colorado; Las Vegas Invitational	W 87–84	4–1	Leavey Center (1,249); Santa Clara, CA
11/26/2010*; 7:30 pm		vs. Arizona; Las Vegas Invitational	L 59–82	4–2	Orleans Arena; Paradise, NV
11/27/2010*; 4:30 pm		vs. Ohio; Las Vegas Invitational	W 78–72	4–3	Orleans Arena; Paradise, NV
12/04/2010*; 7:00 pm		UC Santa Barbara	W 80–69	4–4	Leavey Center (2,037); Santa Clara, CA
12/10/2010*; 7:00 pm		at San Jose State	W 67–63	5–4	The Event Center Arena (3,411); San Jose, CA
12/14/2010*; 7:00 pm		at Pacific	L 59–69	5–5	Alex G. Spanos Center (1,939); Stockton, CA
12/17/2010*; 7:00 pm		Houston Baptist	W 90–67	6–5	Leavey Center (1,641); Santa Clara, CA
12/19/2010*; 7:00 pm		Washington State	L 79–85 ^{OT}	6–6	Leavey Center (1,897); Santa Clara, CA
12/22/2010*; 7:00 pm		at Cal State Northridge	W 99–79	7–6	Matadome (704); Northridge, CA
12/29/2010*; 6:00 pm		Delaware; Cable Car Classic	L 53–54	7–7	Leavey Center (1,601); Santa Clara, CA
12/30/2010*; 6:00 pm		Fordham; Cable Car Classic	W 85–70	8–7	Leavey Center (1,455); Santa Clara, CA
01/03/2011*; 7:00 pm		Bethany	W 87–57	9–7	Leavey Center (1,407); Santa Clara, CA
01/08/2011; 8:00 pm, CSNCA		San Francisco	L 67–74	9–8 (0–1)	Leavey Center (3,159); Santa Clara, CA
01/13/2011; 7:00 pm		at San Diego	W 61–52	10–8 (1–1)	Jenny Craig Pavilion (2,353); San Diego, CA
01/15/2011; 8:00 pm, CSNBA		at Saint Mary's	L 59–84	10–9 (1–2)	McKeon Pavilion (3,500); Moraga, CA
01/20/2011; 6:00 pm, ESPNU		Gonzaga	W 85–71	11–9 (2–2)	Leavey Center (4,017); Santa Clara, CA
01/22/2011; 7:30 pm, CSNBA		Portland	W 72–59	12–9 (3–2)	Leavey Center (2,037); Santa Clara, CA
01/27/2011; 7:30 pm		at Pepperdine	W 71–59	13–9 (4–2)	Firestone Fieldhouse (1,412); Malibu, CA
01/29/2011; 7:00 pm		at Loyola Marymount	W 79–72	14–9 (5–2)	Gersten Pavilion (3,756); Los Angeles, CA
02/01/2011*; 7:00 pm		UC Santa Cruz	W 85–60	15–9	Leavey Center (1,679); Santa Clara, CA
02/05/2011; 8:00 pm, CSNCA		at San Francisco	L 62–68	15–10 (5–3)	War Memorial Gymnasium (3,978); San Francisco, CA
02/10/2011; 8:00 pm, ESPNU		Saint Mary's	L 59–65	15–11 (5–4)	Leavey Center (3,587); Santa Clara, CA
02/12/2011; 5:30 pm, CSNCA		San Diego	W 60–56	16–11 (6–4)	Leavey Center (2,047); Santa Clara, CA
02/17/2011; 5:30 pm		at Gonzaga	L 76–85	16–12 (6–5)	McCarthey Athletic Center (6,000); Spokane, WA
02/19/2011; 5:30 pm, CSNBA		at Portland	L 68–78	16–13 (6–6)	Chiles Center (3,829); Portland, OR
02/24/2011; 8:30 pm, ESPNU		Loyola Marymount	W 94–88 ^{2OT}	17–13 (7–6)	Leavey Center (1,885); Santa Clara, CA
02/26/2011; 7:00 pm		Pepperdine	W 71–68	18–13 (8–6)	Leavey Center (3,678); Santa Clara, CA
WCC tournament
03/05/2011; 6:00 pm	(4)	vs. (8) Loyola Marymount; WCC Quarterfinals	W 76–68	19–13	Orleans Arena (7,045); Paradise, NV
03/06/2011; 5:00 pm, ESPN2	(4)	vs. (1) Saint Mary's; WCC Semifinals	L 64–73	19–14	Orleans Arena (7,489); Paradise, NV
CollegeInsider.com tournament
03/15/2011*; 7:00 pm, FCS		Northern Arizona; CIT First Round	W 68–63	20–14	Leavey Center (1,309); Santa Clara, CA
03/18/2011*; 7:00 pm, FCS		Air Force; CIT Second Round	W 88–75	21–14	Leavey Center (1,236); Santa Clara, CA
03/22/2011*; 7:00 pm, FCS		at San Francisco; CIT Quarterfinals	W 95–91	22–14	War Memorial Gymnasium (2,615); San Francisco, CA
03/25/2011*; 5:00 pm, FCS		at SMU; CIT Semifinals	W 72–55	23–14	Moody Coliseum (2,458); University Park, TX
03/30/2011*; 5:00 pm, FCS		at Iona; CIT Championship Game	W 76–69	24–14	Hynes Athletic Center (2,202); New Rochelle, NY
*Non-conference game. ^{#}Rankings from AP Poll. (#) Tournament seedings in parentheses. All times are in Pacific Time.
