= 2011 West Coast Conference men's basketball tournament =

- 2011 WCC Tournament Logo
- Classification: Division I
- Season: 2010–11
- Teams: 8
- Site: Orleans Arena; Paradise, NV
- Champions: Gonzaga (11th title)
- Winning coach: Mark Few (9th title)
- MVP: Marquise Carter (Gonzaga)
- Television: ESPN/ESPN2/BYUtv

2010–11 West Coast Conference men's basketball standings
	Conf.				Overall
Team	W		L	PCT	W		L	PCT
Saint Mary's	11	–	3	.786	25	–	9	.735
† Gonzaga	11	–	3	.786	25	–	10	.714
San Francisco	10	–	4	.714	19	–	15	.559
Santa Clara	8	–	6	.571	24	–	14	.632
Portland	7	–	7	.500	20	–	12	.625
Pepperdine	5	–	9	.357	12	–	21	.364
Loyola Marymount	2	–	12	.143	11	–	21	.344
San Diego	2	–	12	.143	6	–	24	.200
† 2011 WCC tournament winner As of March 30, 2011; Rankings from AP Poll

The 2011 West Coast Conference men's basketball tournament was held March 4–7 at the Orleans Arena in the Las Vegas-area community of Paradise, Nevada to crown a champion of the West Coast Conference. In the third consecutive final that involved Gonzaga and Saint Mary's, Gonzaga won to secure its 13th consecutive appearance in the NCAA tournament.

== Format ==
All eight teams in the conference qualified for the tournament, with seeds based on regular season records. The top two seeds received byes into the semifinals while the 3 and 4 seeds received byes into the quarterfinals. The first and second round games were broadcast by BYUtv Sports. The two semifinal games were televised on ESPN2, with the championship game broadcast by ESPN.

== Bracket ==
All Times Pacific

First round Friday, March 4 BYUtv
5	Portland	68
8	Loyola Marymount	72
6	Pepperdine	84
7	San Diego	81

Quarterfinals; Saturday, March 5 BYUtv
8	Loyola Marymount	68
4	Santa Clara	76
6	Pepperdine	59
3	San Francisco	76

Semifinals; Sunday, March 6 ESPN2
4	Santa Clara	64
1	Saint Mary's	73
3	San Francisco	67
2	Gonzaga	71

Championship; Monday, March 7 ESPN
1	Saint Mary's	63
2	Gonzaga	75
