= 2010–11 Portland Pilots men's basketball team =

American college basketball season

2010–11 Portland Pilots men's basketball
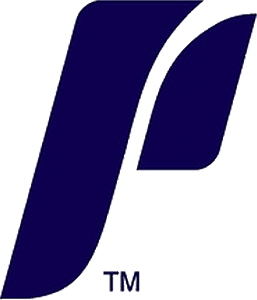

CIT, 1st Round
- Conference: West Coast Conference
- Record: 20–12 (7–7 WCC)
- Head coach: Eric Reveno (5th season)
- Assistant coaches: Joel Sobotka; Eric Jackson; Michael Wolf
- Home arena: Chiles Center

2010–11 West Coast Conference men's basketball standings
	Conf.				Overall
Team	W		L	PCT	W		L	PCT
Saint Mary's	11	–	3	.786	25	–	9	.735
† Gonzaga	11	–	3	.786	25	–	10	.714
San Francisco	10	–	4	.714	19	–	15	.559
Santa Clara	8	–	6	.571	24	–	14	.632
Portland	7	–	7	.500	20	–	12	.625
Pepperdine	5	–	9	.357	12	–	21	.364
Loyola Marymount	2	–	12	.143	11	–	21	.344
San Diego	2	–	12	.143	6	–	24	.200
† 2011 WCC tournament winner As of March 30, 2011; Rankings from AP Poll

The 2010–11 Portland Pilots men's basketball team represented University of Portland in the 2010–11 NCAA Division I men's basketball season. The Pilots were members of the West Coast Conference and were led by fifth-year head coach Eric Reveno. They played their home games at the Chiles Center. They finished the season with 20–12, 7–7 in WCC play and lost the first round in the 2011 West Coast Conference men's basketball tournament to Loyola Marymount. They were invited to the 2011 CollegeInsider.com Tournament which they lost to Hawaii in the first round.

== Roster ==
Name	Number	Pos.	Height	Weight	Year	Hometown	High School/Last College
Eric Waterford	1	G	6' 1"	180	Junior	Modesto, California	St. Thomas More School
Tanner Riley	3	G	6' 3"	200	Freshman	North Bend, Washington	Mount Si High School
John Bailey	5	F	6' 8"	210	Freshman	Mesa, Arizona	Dobson High School
Taylor Mossman	10	G	6' 2"	185	Freshman	Anaheim, California	Findlay Prep
Tim Douglas	11	G	5' 10"	160	Freshman	Cerritos, California	Mayfair High School
Riley Barker	14	C	6' 10"	225	Freshman	Surrey, British Columbia	White Rock Christian Academy
Derrick Rodgers	15	G	6' 1"	210	Sophomore	Rancho Cucamonga, California	Citrus College
Jared Stohl	20	G	6' 2"	165	Senior	Marysville, Washington	Marysville Pilchuck High School
Korey Thieleke	21	G	6' 3"	170	Freshman	Bakersfield, California	West High School
Ryan Nicholas	32	F	6' 7"	235	Freshman	Spokane, Washington	Gonzaga Prep
Nemanja Mitrovic	33	G	6' 5"	200	Junior	Toronto, Ontario	Northern Secondary School
Luke Sikma	43	F	6' 8"	235	Senior	Bellevue, Washington	Bellevue High School
Kramer Knutson	45	C	6' 9"	220	Senior	Mesa, Arizona	Dobson High School
Jasonn Hannibal	55	C	6' 10"	270	Senior	Mississauga, Ontario	Port Credit Secondary

== 2010–11 Schedule and results ==
Date time, TV	Rank^{#}	Opponent^{#}	Result	Record	Site (attendance) city, state
Exhibition
11/07/2010*; 1:00 pm		Concordia (CA)	W 68–65	—	Chiles Center (1,076); Portland, OR
Regular season
11/12/2010*; 1:30 pm		Milwaukee; Athletes in Action Basketball Classic	W 80–60	1–0	Chiles Center (1,379); Portland, OR
11/13/2010*; 7:00 pm		UC Davis; Athletes in Action Basketball Classic	W 75–60	2–0	Chiles Center (1,855); Portland, OR
11/14/2010*; 7:00 pm		Florida Atlantic; Athletes in Action Basketball Classic	W 89–75	3–0	Chiles Center (1,164); Portland, OR
11/19/2010*; 7:30 pm, ESPNU		vs. No. 12 Kentucky	L 48–79	3–1	Rose Garden (10,216); Portland, OR
11/20/2010*; 7:05 pm		at Idaho	W 66–53	4–1	Memorial Gym (598); Moscow, ID
11/23/2010*; 7:30 pm, FSNNW		vs. Washington State; Cougar Hardwood Classic	L 68–84	4–2	KeyArena (8,441); Seattle, WA
11/27/2010*; 7:00 pm		UC Santa Barbara	W 75–63	5–2	Chiles Center (1,389); Portland, OR
11/30/2010*; 7:00 pm		Saint Louis	W 69–60	6–2	Chiles Center (1,343); Portland, OR
12/03/2010*; 7:05 pm		at Montana	W 58–54	7–2	Dahlberg Arena (3,589); Missoula, MT
12/06/2010*; 7:00 pm, FSNNW		at No. 21 Washington	L 72–94	7–3	Alaska Airlines Arena (9,425); Seattle, WA
12/11/2010*; 4:00 pm, FSNRM		at Denver	W 71–64	8–3	Magness Arena (2,473); Denver, CO
12/18/2010*; 7:05 pm		at Portland State	W 78–67	9–3	Stott Center (1,302); Portland, OR
12/22/2010*; 7:00 pm		Boise State	W 88–79	10–3	Chiles Center (2,729); Portland, OR
12/27/2010*; 7:00 pm		Nevada	W 66–62	11–3	Chiles Center (2,071); Portland, OR
12/31/2010*; 2:00 pm		Utah	W 88–79	12–3	Chiles Center (1,756); Portland, OR
01/08/2011; 5:30 pm, FSNNW		at Gonzaga	L 61–74	12–4 (0–1)	McCarthey Athletic Center (6,000); Spokane, WA
01/13/2011; 8:00 pm, ESPNU		Loyola Marymount	W 79–78 ^{2OT}	13–4 (1–1)	Chiles Center (1,979); Portland, OR
01/15/2011; 7:00 pm		Pepperdine	W 57–42	14–4 (2–1)	Chiles Center (2,448); Portland, OR
01/20/2011; 7:30 pm, CSNNW		at San Francisco	L 74–81	14–5 (2–2)	War Memorial Gymnasium (1,819); San Francisco, CA
01/22/2011; 3:00 pm, CSNNW		at Santa Clara	L 59–72	14–6 (2–3)	Leavey Center (2,037); Santa Clara, CA
01/27/2011; 7:00 pm, CSNNW		San Diego	W 79–64	15–6 (3–3)	Chiles Center (2,001); Portland, OR
01/29/2011; 7:00 pm, ESPNU		Saint Mary's	W 85–70	16–6 (4–3)	Chiles Center (3,833); Portland, OR
02/03/2011; 8:00 pm, ESPN2		Gonzaga	L 64–67	16–7 (4–4)	Chiles Center (4,852); Portland, OR
02/05/2011*; 7:10 pm, FSNNW		at Seattle	W 71–55	17–7	KeyArena (6,111); Seattle, WA
02/10/2011; 7:05 pm		at Pepperdine	L 64–66	17–8 (4–5)	Firestone Fieldhouse (1,194); Malibu, CA
02/12/2011; 7:05 pm, FS West		at Loyola Marymount	W 71–48	18–8 (5–5)	Gersten Pavilion (3,302); Los Angeles, CA
02/17/2011; 6:00 pm, ESPNU		San Francisco	L 73–82	18–9 (5–6)	Chiles Center (2,538); Portland, OR
02/19/2011; 5:30 pm, CSNNW		Santa Clara	W 78–68	19–9 (6–6)	Chiles Center (3,820); Portland, OR
02/24/2011; 8:00 pm, CSNNW		at San Diego	W 65–61	20–9 (7–6)	Jenny Craig Pavilion (1,592); San Diego, CA
02/26/2011; 8:00 pm, CSNNW		at Saint Mary's	L 69–83	20–10 (7–7)	McKeon Pavilion (3,500); Moraga, CA
WCC tournament
03/04/2011; 8:00 pm, BYU TV	(5)	vs. (8) Loyola Marymount; WCC First Round	L 68–72	20–11	Orleans Arena; Paradise, NV
CollegeInsider.com tournament
03/15/2011*; 7:00 pm		at Hawaii; CIT First Round	L 64–76	20–12	Stan Sheriff Center (4,431); Honolulu, HI
*Non-conference game. ^{#}Rankings from AP Poll. (#) Tournament seedings in parentheses. All times are in Pacific Time.
