= 2010–11 Montana Grizzlies basketball team =

American college basketball season

2010–11 Montana Grizzlies basketball

CBI, First round
- Conference: Big Sky Conference
- Record: 21–11 (12–4 Big Sky)
- Head coach: Wayne Tinkle (4th season)
- Assistant coaches: Andy Hill (7th season); Bill Evans (3rd season); Freddie Owens (2nd season)
- Home arena: Dahlberg Arena

2010–11 Big Sky men's basketball standings
	Conf.				Overall
Team	W		L	PCT	W		L	PCT
Northern Colorado †	13	–	3	.813	21	–	11	.656
Montana	12	–	4	.750	21	–	11	.656
Weber State	11	–	5	.688	18	–	14	.563
Northern Arizona	9	–	7	.563	19	–	13	.594
Montana State	7	–	9	.438	13	–	18	.419
Eastern Washington	7	–	9	.438	10	–	20	.333
Portland State	5	–	11	.313	14	–	16	.467
Idaho State	4	–	12	.250	9	–	20	.310
Sacramento State	4	–	12	.250	7	–	21	.250
† Conference tournament winner

The 2010–11 Montana Grizzlies basketball team represented the University of Montana in the 2010–11 NCAA Division I men's basketball season. The Grizzlies, led by head coach Wayne Tinkle, played their home games at Dahlberg Arena in Missoula, Montana, as members of the Big Sky Conference. The Grizzlies finished second in the Big Sky during the regular season, and advanced to the championship game of the Big Sky tournament. Montana lost to Northern Colorado in the Big Sky championship game.

Montana failed to qualify for the NCAA tournament, but were invited to the 2011 College Basketball Invitational. The Grizzlies were eliminated in the first round of the CBI in a loss to Duquesne, 87–76.

== Roster ==
2010–11 Montana Grizzlies men's basketball team
Players
Coaches

Pos.	#	Name	Height	Weight	Year	Hometown
G	0	Vaughn Autry	6 ft 2 in (1.88 m)	192 lb (87 kg)	Fr	Los Angeles, California
F	1	Art Steward	6 ft 4 in (1.93 m)	210 lb (95 kg)	Jr	Casper, Wyoming
G	3	Taylor Farnsworth	6 ft 6 in (1.98 m)	210 lb (95 kg)	Fr	Spokane, Washington
G	5	Will Cherry	6 ft 1 in (1.85 m)	177 lb (80 kg)	So	Oakland, California
G	12	Jordan Wood	6 ft 3 in (1.91 m)	200 lb (91 kg)	Jr	Cedar City, Utah
G	20	Chase Adams	6 ft 3 in (1.91 m)	195 lb (88 kg)	So	Tucson, Arizona
G	22	Shawn Stockton	6 ft 0 in (1.83 m)	191 lb (87 kg)	Jr	Spokane, Washington
F	24	Derek Selvig	7 ft 0 in (2.13 m)	230 lb (104 kg)	Jr	Glendive, Montana
F	32	Kareem Jamar	6 ft 5 in (1.96 m)	210 lb (95 kg)	Fr	Venice, California
F	33	Mike Weisner	6 ft 7 in (2.01 m)	185 lb (84 kg)	Fr	Walla Walla, Washington
F	40	Mathias Ward	6 ft 7 in (2.01 m)	236 lb (107 kg)	So	Gig Harbor, Washington
C	41	Brian Qvale	6 ft 11 in (2.11 m)	265 lb (120 kg)	Sr	Williston, North Dakota
F	45	Eric Hutchison	6 ft 9 in (2.06 m)	230 lb (104 kg)	Fr	Longview, Washington
F	50	Billy Reader	6 ft 9 in (2.06 m)	217 lb (98 kg)	Fr	Lake Oswego, Oregon

Head coach

- Wayne Tinkle (Montana)

Assistant coach(es)

- Andy Hill (Eastern Washington)
- Bill Evans (Southern Utah)
- Freddie Owens (Wisconsin)

Legend

- (C) Team captain
- (S) Suspended
- (I) Ineligible
- (W) Walk-on
- Injured
- Current redshirt

Roster
Last update: January 25, 2023

== Schedule and results ==
Date time, TV	Rank^{#}	Opponent^{#}	Result	Record	Site (attendance) city, state
Exhibition
November 4, 2010*; 7:00 pm		Lewis–Clark State	W 59–39	—	Dahlberg Arena; Missoula, MT
Regular season
November 13, 2010*; 3:00 pm		at Nevada	L 66–81	0–1	Lawlor Events Center (4,408); Reno, NV
November 17, 2010*; 7:00 am		at Utah	L 69–82	0–2	Jon M. Huntsman Center (7,293); Salt Lake City, UT
November 19, 2010*; 3:00 pm		Montana Tech	W 78–51	1–2	Dahlberg Arena (2,646); Missoula, MT
November 22, 2010*; 7:00 pm		Idaho	W 75–33	2–2	Dahlberg Arena (2,530); Missoula, MT
November 30, 2010*; 7:00 pm		Cal State Fullerton	W 75–67	3–2	Dahlberg Arena (2,912); Missoula, MT
December 3, 2010*; 7:00 pm		Portland	L 48–58	3–3	Dahlberg Arena (3,589); Missoula, MT
December 5, 2010*; 8:00 pm		at UCLA	W 66–57	4–3	Pauley Pavilion (5,391); Los Angeles, CA
December 9, 2010*; 7:00 pm		Great Falls	W 85–50	5–3	Dahlberg Arena (2,641); Missoula, MT
December 12, 2010*; 2:00 pm		at San Francisco	L 48–50 ^{OT}	5–4	War Memorial Gymnasium (1,676); San Francisco, CA
December 15, 2010*; 7:00 pm		Oregon State	W 71–66	6–4	Dahlberg Arena (4,378); Missoula, MT
December 18, 2010*; 8:00 pm		at Idaho	W 64–63	7–4	Cowan Spectrum (922); Moscow, ID
December 22, 2010*; 8:00 pm		at Cal State Fullerton	W 71–57	8–4	Titan Gym (722); Fullerton, CA
December 29, 2011; 1:00 pm		Northern Arizona	W 83–80	9–4 (1–0)	Dahlberg Arena (4,061); Missoula, MT
December 31, 2011; 1:00 pm		Weber State	W 75–56	10–4 (2–0)	Dahlberg Arena (4,606); Missoula, MT
January 6, 2011; 7:00 pm		at Northern Colorado	L 67–76	10–5 (2–1)	Butler–Hancock Sports Pavilion (1,115); Greeley, CO
January 8, 2011; 8:00 pm		at Sacramento State	W 68–52	11–5 (3–1)	Hornets Nest (639); Sacramento, CA
January 13, 2011; 7:00 pm		Eastern Washington	W 66–47	12–5 (4–1)	Dahlberg Arena (3,609); Missoula, MT
January 15, 2011; 7:00 pm		Portland State	W 77–70	13–5 (5–1)	Dahlberg Arena (4,505); Missoula, MT
January 20, 2011; 7:00 pm		at Idaho State	W 75–65	14–5 (6–1)	Reed Gym (2,176); Pocatello, ID
January 22, 2011; 7:00 pm		Montana State	W 75–61	15–5 (7–1)	Dahlberg Arena (7,312); Missoula, MT
January 29, 2011; 7:00 pm		at Montana State	W 79–58	16–5 (8–1)	Brick Breeden Fieldhouse (7,956); Bozeman, MT
February 3, 2011; 7:00 pm		at Weber State	L 52–68	16–6 (8–2)	Dee Events Center (6,956); Ogden, UT
February 5, 2011; 6:30 pm		at Northern Arizona	L 53–70	16–7 (8–3)	Rolle Activity Center (1,064); Flagstaff, AZ
February 10, 2011; 7:00 pm		Sacramento State	W 64–44	17–7 (9–3)	Dahlberg Arena (3,725); Missoula, MT
February 12, 2011; 7:00 pm		Northern Colorado	W 55–42	18–7 (10–3)	Dahlberg Arena (6,542); Missoula, MT
February 16, 2011; 7:00 pm		Idaho State	W 71–52	19–7 (11–3)	Dahlberg Arena (4,048); Missoula, MT
February 19, 2011*; 9:00 pm		at Long Beach State; ESPN BracketBusters	L 56–74	19–8	Walter Pyramid (3,368); Long Beach, CA
February 24, 2011; 8:00 pm		at Portland State	W 85–84	20–8 (12–3)	Stott Center (1,303); Portland, OR
February 26, 2011; 6:00 pm		at Eastern Washington	L 55–59 ^{OT}	20–9 (12–4)	Reese Court; Cheney
Big Sky tournament
March 8, 2011; 5:30 pm	(2)	vs. (3) Weber State; Big Sky Semifinals	W 57–40	21–9	Butler–Hancock Sports Pavilion (6,205); Greeley, CO
March 9, 2011; 7:00 pm, ESPN2	(2)	at (1) Northern Colorado; Big Sky Championship	L 60–65	21–10	Butler–Hancock Sports Pavilion (3,182); Greeley, CO
CBI
March 16, 2011; 8:05 pm		Duquesne; CBI First Round	L 76–87	21–11	Dahlberg Arena (2,830); Missoula, MT
*Non-conference game. ^{#}Rankings from AP Poll. (#) Tournament seedings in parentheses. All times are in Mountain Time.
