= 2011 Big Sky Conference men's basketball tournament =

- Classification: Division I
- Season: 2010–11
- Teams: 6
- First round site: campus sites (2); Ogden, Utah; Flagstaff, Arizona
- Semifinals site: Butler–Hancock Sports Pavilion; Greeley, Colorado
- Finals site: Butler–Hancock Sports Pavilion; Greeley, Colorado
- Champions: Northern Colorado Bears (1st title)
- Winning coach: B. J. Hill (1st title)
- Television: ESPN2 (final)

2010–11 Big Sky men's basketball standings
	Conf.				Overall
Team	W		L	PCT	W		L	PCT
Northern Colorado †	13	–	3	.813	21	–	11	.656
Montana	12	–	4	.750	21	–	11	.656
Weber State	11	–	5	.688	18	–	14	.563
Northern Arizona	9	–	7	.563	19	–	13	.594
Montana State	7	–	9	.438	13	–	18	.419
Eastern Washington	7	–	9	.438	10	–	20	.333
Portland State	5	–	11	.313	14	–	16	.467
Idaho State	4	–	12	.250	9	–	20	.310
Sacramento State	4	–	12	.250	7	–	21	.250
† Conference tournament winner

The 2011 Big Sky men's basketball tournament was played March 5–9, with the first round quarterfinal games held at the higher seed's home arena. The semifinals and final were at the Butler–Hancock Sports Pavilion in Greeley, Colorado, the home court of regular season champion Northern Colorado.

The top six teams from regular season play qualified for the tournament, and the top two received a bye to the semifinals. Host Northern Colorado won the title to advance to the NCAA tournament, their first appearance as a Division I program.

In 2017, the NCAA issued a six-year show cause penalty to B. J. Hill, coach of Northern Colorado at the time of the 2011 Big Sky tournament, and forced Northern Colorado to vacate their 2011 conference championship win due to academic fraud and the use of ineligible players.

== Bracket ==
First Round; Saturday, March 5
3	Weber State	79
6	Eastern Washington	70
4	Northern Arizona	65
5	Montana State	62

Re-Seeded Semifinals; Tuesday, March 8
2	Montana	57
3	Weber State	40
4	Northern Arizona	70
1	Northern Colorado	73

Championship; Wednesday, March 9
2	Montana	60
1	Northern Colorado	65
