= 2010–11 Saint Mary's Gaels men's basketball team =

American college basketball season

2010–11 Saint Mary's Gaels men's basketball

WCC regular season co-champions

NIT, First Round
- Conference: West Coast Conference
- Record: 25–9 (11–3 WCC)
- Head coach: Randy Bennett
- Assistant coaches: Rick Croy; Adam Caporn; Eran Ganot
- Home arena: McKeon Pavilion

2010–11 West Coast Conference men's basketball standings
	Conf.				Overall
Team	W		L	PCT	W		L	PCT
Saint Mary's	11	–	3	.786	25	–	9	.735
† Gonzaga	11	–	3	.786	25	–	10	.714
San Francisco	10	–	4	.714	19	–	15	.559
Santa Clara	8	–	6	.571	24	–	14	.632
Portland	7	–	7	.500	20	–	12	.625
Pepperdine	5	–	9	.357	12	–	21	.364
Loyola Marymount	2	–	12	.143	11	–	21	.344
San Diego	2	–	12	.143	6	–	24	.200
† 2011 WCC tournament winner As of March 30, 2011; Rankings from AP Poll

The 2010–11 Saint Mary's Gaels men's basketball team represented Saint Mary's College of California in the 2010–11 college basketball season. This was head coach Randy Bennett's tenth season at Saint Mary's. The Gaels competed in the West Coast Conference and played their home games at the McKeon Pavilion. They finished the season 25–9, 11–3 in WCC play to tie with Gonzaga for the regular season conference title. They advanced to the championship game of the 2011 West Coast Conference men's basketball tournament before losing to Gonzaga. As a regular season champion who failed to win their conference tournament, the Gaels earned an automatic bid in the 2011 National Invitation Tournament where they were upset in the first round by Kent State.

== Roster ==
#	Name	Height	Weight (lbs.)	Position	Class	Hometown	Previous Team(s)
1	Jorden Page	6'1"	180	G	So.	Maroochydore, Queensland, Australia	AIS
3	Mitchell Young	6'9"	235	F	So.	Logan, Queensland, Australia	AIS
4	Matthew Dellavedova	6'4"	190	G	So.	Maryborough, Victoria, Australia	AIS
5	Eividas Petrulis	6'7"	210	F	Fr.	Vilnius, Lithuania	Sarunas Marciulionis Academy
00	Brad Waldow	6'9"	250	F	Fr.	Shingle Springs, CA, U.S.	Ponderosa High
10	Zach Sanchez	6'1"	175	G	Fr.	Bonita, CA, U.S.	Bonita Vista High
11	Clint Steindl	6'7"	195	F	Jr.	Mackay, Queensland, Australia	AIS
12	Tim Harris	6'3"	200	F	RFr.	San Jose, CA, U.S.	Valley Christian HS
14	Stephen Holt	6'4"	195	G	Fr.	Portland, OR, U.S.	Jesuit High School
15	Beau Levesque	6'6"	220	F	So.	Lafayette, CA, U.S.	De La Salle HS
22	Rob Jones	6'6"	240	F	RJr.	San Francisco, CA, U.S.	Archbishop Riordan; San Diego
23	Paul McCoy	5'11"	175	G	Jr.	Portland, OR, U.S.	Grant HS; SMU
25	Tim Williams	6'9"	235	F	RSo.	Antioch, CA, U.S.	Antioch HS
30	Kenton Walker II	6'9"	240	F	RJr.	San Diego, CA, U.S.	Scripps Ranch HS; Creighton
32	Mickey McConnell	6'0"	190	G	Sr.	Mesa, AZ, U.S.	Dobson HS
40	Phil Benson	6'8"	230	F	RSr.	Scottsdale, AZ, U.S.	Horizon HS; Canisius

== Schedule and results ==
- All times are Pacific

Date time, TV	Rank^{#}	Opponent^{#}	Result	Record	Site (attendance) city, state
Regular season
11/12/2010*; 8:30pm		College of Idaho	W 86–42	1–0	McKeon Pavilion (3,500); Moraga, CA
11/16/2010*; 11:00pm, ESPN		St. John's	W 76–71	2–0	McKeon Pavilion (3,500); Moraga, CA
11/18/2010*; 7:00pm		Point Loma	W 101–69	3–0	McKeon Pavilion (2,266); Moraga, CA
11/21/2010*; 4:00pm		Mississippi Valley State	W 87–52	4–0	McKeon Pavilion (2,736); Moraga, CA
11/23/2010*; 7:00pm		Chicago State; South Padre Island Invitational	W 121–52	5–0	McKeon Pavilion (3,050); Moraga, CA
11/26/2010*; 5:30pm		vs. Texas Tech; South Padre Island Invitational	W 88–68	6–0	South Padre Island Convention Centre (1,100); South Padre Island, TX
11/27/2010*; 5:00pm		vs. No. 23 BYU; South Padre Island Invitational	L 73–74	6–1	South Padre Island Convention Centre (1,300); South Padre Island, TX
12/1/2010*; 7:30pm, The Mtn.		at No. 17 San Diego State	L 55–69	6–2	Viejas Arena (12,414); San Diego, CA
12/8/2010*; 7:00pm		Denver	W 77–47	7–2	McKeon Pavilion (2,662); Moraga, CA
12/14/2010*; 7:00pm		UC Riverside	W 75–56	8–2	McKeon Pavilion (2,551); Moraga, CA
12/18/2010*; 11:45am		vs. Long Beach State; Wooden Classic	W 82–74	9–2	Honda Center (3,506); Anaheim, CA
12/23/2010*; 6:00pm		at New Mexico State	W 73–53	10–2	Pan American Center (5,681); Las Cruces, NM
12/29/2010*; 4:30pm, ESPNU		vs. Mississippi State; Shamrock Shootout	W 94–72	11–2	Orleans Arena (1,231); Las Vegas, NV
12/31/2010*; 5:00pm		Hartford	W 87–63	12–2	McKeon Pavilion (2,996); Moraga, CA
1/6/2011; 6:00pm, ESPNU		at Loyola Marymount	W 98–75	13–2 (1–0)	Gersten Pavilion (2,040); Los Angeles, CA
1/8/2011; 6:30pm, CSN+/FSN		at Pepperdine	W 85–60	14–2 (2–0)	Firestone Fieldhouse (1,424); Malibu, CA
1/13/2011; 7:30pm, CSN+		San Francisco	W 71–57	15–2 (3–0)	McKeon Pavilion (3,500); Moraga, CA
1/15/2011; 8:00pm, CSNBA		Santa Clara	W 84–59	16–2 (4–0)	McKeon Pavilion (3,500); Moraga, CA
1/19/2011; 7:30pm, CSNC	No. 22	San Diego	W 67–56	17–2 (5–0)	McKeon Pavilion (3,500); Moraga, CA
1/22/2011*; 11:00am	No. 22	at Vanderbilt	L 70–89	17–3	Memorial Gym (14,316); Nashville, TN
1/27/2011; 8:00pm, ESPN2		at Gonzaga	W 73–71	18–3 (6–0)	McCarthey Athletic Center (6,000); Spokane, WA
1/29/2011; 4:00pm, ESPNU		at Portland	L 70–85	18–4 (6–1)	Chiles Center (3,833); Portland, OR
2/3/2011; 7:00pm		Pepperdine	W 79–71	19–4 (7–1)	McKeon Pavilion (3,500); Moraga, CA
2/5/2011; 5:00pm, ESPN2		Loyola Marymount	W 79–70	20–4 (8–1)	McKeon Pavilion (3,500); Moraga, CA
2/10/2011; 8:00pm, ESPNU		at Santa Clara	W 65–59	21–4 (9–1)	Leavey Center (3,587); Santa Clara, CA
2/12/2011; 7:30pm, CSNC		at San Francisco	W 86–68	22–4 (10–1)	War Memorial Gymnasium (4,500); San Francisco, CA
2/16/2011; 8:00pm, ESPN2		at San Diego	L 66–74	22–5 (10–2)	Jenny Craig Pavilion (2,794); San Diego, CA
2/19/2011*; 6:00pm, ESPN2		No. 25 Utah State; ESPN BracketBusters	L 65–75	22–6	McKeon Pavilion (3,500); Moraga, CA
2/24/2011; 8:00pm, ESPN2		Gonzaga	L 85–89 ^{OT}	22–7 (10–3)	McKeon Pavilion (3,500); Moraga, CA
2/26/2011; 8:00pm, CSNC		Portland	W 83–69	23–7 (11–3)	McKeon Pavilion (3,500); Moraga, CA
West Coast Conference tournament
3/6/2011; 5:00pm, ESPN2	(1)	vs. (4) Santa Clara; Semi-Finals	W 73–64	24–7	Orleans Arena (7,489); Las Vegas, NV
3/7/2011; 6:00pm, ESPN	(1)	vs. (2) Gonzaga; Championship Game	L 63–75	24–8	Orleans Arena (7,186); Las Vegas, NV
Regular season (game added on 2/21/11)
3/11/2011*; 7:00pm		Weber State	W 77–54	25–8	McKeon Pavilion (3,500); Moraga, CA
2011 NIT
3/15/2011*; 8:00pm, ESPN2	(2 C)	(7 C) Kent State; NIT First Round	L 70–71	25–9	McKeon Pavilion (2,443); Moraga, CA
*Non-conference game. ^{#}Rankings from AP Poll. (#) Tournament seedings in parentheses. C=NIT Colorado bracket.
