= 2011 CollegeInsider.com Postseason Tournament =

- Teams: 24
- Finals site: Hynes Athletic Center; New Rochelle, New York
- Champions: Santa Clara (1st title)
- Runner-up: Iona (1st title game)
- Semifinalists: SMU (1st semifinal); East Tennessee State (1st semifinal)
- Winning coach: Kerry Keating (1st title)
- MVP: Kevin Foster (Santa Clara)

The 2011 CollegeInsider.com Postseason Tournament (CIT) was a postseason single-elimination tournament of 24 NCAA Division I teams. The CIT began with 12 first-round games. Four of the teams that won first-round games advanced to the quarterfinals, while the other eight teams played for the right to advance to the quarterfinals in the second round March 18–19. The announcement of the 2011 field was made on March 13, 2011.

Twenty-three of the participants were selected from teams that were not invited to the 2011 NCAA Tournament or the 2011 National Invitation Tournament. The winner of the 2011 Great West Conference men's basketball tournament, North Dakota, received an automatic bid to the CIT.

The tournament was won by Santa Clara who defeated Iona in the championship game 76–69. Santa Clara was not one of the four teams to receive a second-round bye thus becoming the first team to win five games to win the tournament championship.

== Participating teams ==
The following teams received an invitation to the 2011 CIT:

School	Conference	Overall record	Conference record
Air Force	Mountain West	15–15	6–10
Buffalo	Mid-American	17–13	9–9
East Carolina	Conference USA	18–15	8–8
East Tennessee State	Atlantic Sun	22–11	16–4
Furman	Southern	20–9	12–6
Hawaii	WAC	18–12	8–8
Idaho	WAC	18–13	9–7
Iona	MAAC	22–11	13–5
Jacksonville	Atlantic Sun	19–11	13–7
Marshall	Conference USA	22–11	10–8
North Dakota	Great West	19–14	8–4
Northern Arizona	Big Sky	19–12	9–7
Northern Iowa	Missouri Valley	19–13	10–8
Ohio	Mid-American	18–15	10–8
Oral Roberts	Summit	19–15	13–5
Portland	West Coast	20–11	7–7
Quinnipiac	Northeast	22–9	13–5
Rider	Metro Atlantic Athletic	23–10	13–5
San Francisco	West Coast	17–14	11–4
Santa Clara	West Coast	19–14	8–6
SMU	Conference USA	17–14	8–8
Tennessee Tech	Ohio Valley	20–12	12–6
Valparaiso	Horizon	23–11	12–6
Western Michigan	Mid-American	20–11	11–5

== Format ==
Twelve teams advanced from the first-round games. Of the twelve remaining teams, four received byes into the quarterfinals. RPI, strength of schedule, conference ranking and geographic location determined the byes and seeding of the remaining twelve teams.

== Bracket ==
Bracket is for visual purposes only. The CIT does not have a set bracket.

- East Tennessee State, Iona, Northern Iowa and Ohio received byes to the quarterfinal round following their first round victories.

First round March 14, 15 and 16
North Dakota	67
Air Force	77
Northern Arizona	63
Santa Clara	68
Idaho	73
San Francisco	81
Portland	64
Hawaiʻi	76
Jacksonville	71*
East Carolina	66
Oral Roberts	57
SMU	64*
Rider	50
Northern Iowa	84
Buffalo	75
Quinnipiac	68
Tennessee Tech	66
Western Michigan	74
Iona	85
Valparaiso	77
Ohio	65
Marshall	64
Furman	63
East Tennessee State	76

Second round March 18 and 19
Air Force	75
Santa Clara	88
San Francisco	77
Hawaiʻi	74
Jacksonville	62
SMU	63
Bye
Northern Iowa
Buffalo	49
Western Michigan	48
Bye
Iona
Bye
Ohio
East Tennessee State
Bye

Quarterfinals; March 21 and 22
Santa Clara	95
San Francisco	91
SMU	57
Northern Iowa	50
Buffalo	63
Iona	78
Ohio	73
East Tennessee State	82

Semifinals; March 25 and 26
Santa Clara	72
SMU	55
Iona	83
East Tennessee State	80

Championship; March 30
Santa Clara	76
Iona	69

Home teams are listed second.
* Denotes overtime period.
