= 2010–11 Northern Arizona Lumberjacks men's basketball team =

American college basketball season

2010–11 Northern Arizona Lumberjacks men's basketball
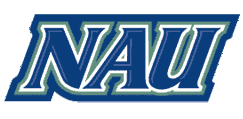

CIT, First round
- Conference: Big Sky Conference
- Record: 19–13 (9–7 Big Sky)
- Head coach: Mike Adras (12th season)
- Assistant coaches: Jay Collins (1st season); Will Hensley (3rd season); Quinton Grogan (2nd season)
- Home arena: Rolle Activity Center

2010–11 Big Sky men's basketball standings
	Conf.				Overall
Team	W		L	PCT	W		L	PCT
Northern Colorado †	13	–	3	.813	21	–	11	.656
Montana	12	–	4	.750	21	–	11	.656
Weber State	11	–	5	.688	18	–	14	.563
Northern Arizona	9	–	7	.563	19	–	13	.594
Montana State	7	–	9	.438	13	–	18	.419
Eastern Washington	7	–	9	.438	10	–	20	.333
Portland State	5	–	11	.313	14	–	16	.467
Idaho State	4	–	12	.250	9	–	20	.310
Sacramento State	4	–	12	.250	7	–	21	.250
† Conference tournament winner

The 2010–11 Northern Arizona Lumberjacks men's basketball team represented Northern Arizona University in the 2010–11 NCAA Division I men's basketball season. The Lumberjacks, led by head coach Mike Adras, played their home games at Rolle Activity Center in Flagstaff, Arizona, as members of the Big Sky Conference. The team was displaced from the Walkup Skydome, their usual home court, because of major renovations that began in December 2010, after the conclusion of football season.

The Lumberjacks finished 4th in the Big Sky Conference during the regular season, and were eliminated in the semifinals of the Big Sky tournament by tournament host and eventual conference champion Northern Colorado.

Northern Arizona failed to qualify for the NCAA tournament, but were invited to the 2011 CIT. The Lumberjacks lost in the first round of the CIT, where they were eliminated by the eventual champions Santa Clara, 68–63.

This was Mike Adras' last full season as head coach of the Lumberjacks. On December 6, 2011, Adras resigned following an internal investigation showed that he was responsible for multiple NCAA violations in the Northern Arizona program.

== Roster ==
2010–11 Northern Arizona Lumberjacks men's basketball team
Players
Coaches

Pos.	#	Name	Height	Weight	Year	Hometown
G	1	Michael Dunn	6 ft 0 in (1.83 m)	—	So	Chandler, Arizona
G	2	DeAngelo Jones	6 ft 5 in (1.96 m)	—	Sr	Seattle, Washington
G	10	Cameron Jones	6 ft 4 in (1.93 m)	—	Sr	Los Angeles, California
G	11	Gabe Rogers	6 ft 2 in (1.88 m)	—	So	Houston, Texas
G	12	Julian Olubuyi	5 ft 9 in (1.75 m)	—	Sr	Houston, Texas
F	20	Gaellan Bewernick	6 ft 6 in (1.98 m)	—	Fr	Los Angeles, California
G	21	Stallon Saldivar	6 ft 0 in (1.83 m)	—	So	Salt Lake City, Utah
G	23	Luis Flores	6 ft 3 in (1.91 m)	—	RS So	Scottsdale, Arizona
G	30	Eric Platt	6 ft 5 in (1.96 m)	—	Sr	Casper, Wyoming
G	32	Ify Umodu	6 ft 3 in (1.91 m)	—	RS Fr	Covina, California
G	34	Durrell Norman	6 ft 4 in (1.93 m)	—	Jr	Victorville, California
F	40	Shane Johannsen	6 ft 7 in (2.01 m)	—	Sr	Phoenix, Arizona

Head coach

- Mike Adras (UC Santa Barbara)

Assistant coach(es)

- Jay Collins (Southern Utah)
- Will Hensley (Northern Arizona)
- Quinton Grogan (Cal State Dominguez Hills)

Legend

- (C) Team captain
- (S) Suspended
- (I) Ineligible
- (W) Walk-on
- Injured
- Current redshirt

Roster
Last update: January 22, 2023

== Schedule and results ==
Date time, TV	Rank^{#}	Opponent^{#}	Result	Record	Site (attendance) city, state
Exhibition
November 3, 2010*; 6:35 pm		Western New Mexico	W 96–86	—	Rolle Activity Center; Flagstaff, AZ
Regular season
November 12, 2010*; 6:00 pm		at Iowa State; Global Sports Hy-Vee Challenge	L 64–78	0–1	Hilton Coliseum (12,886); Ames, IA
November 14, 2010*; 12:00 pm		at Creighton; Global Sports Hy-Vee Challenge	L 70–74	0–2	Qwest Center Omaha (15,147); Omaha, NE
November 16, 2010*; 7:00 pm		vs. Alabama State; Global Sports Hy-Vee Challenge	W 74–46	1–2	Tim's Toyota Center (838); Prescott Valley, AZ
November 19, 2010*; 7:35 pm		Southwestern (AZ)	W 97–47	2–2	Rolle Activity Center (857); Flagstaff, AZ
November 22, 2010*; 5:30 pm		at Kennesaw State; Global Sports Hy-Vee Challenge	W 74–66	3–2	KSU Convocation Center (1,377); Kennesaw, GA
November 28, 2010*; 7:00 pm		at Pepperdine	W 88–74	4–2	Firestone Fieldhouse (510); Malibu, CA
November 30, 2010*; 8:00 pm		at Cal State Bakersfield	W 81–77	5–2	Rabobank Arena (1,187); Bakersfield, CA
December 4, 2010*; 7:05 pm		Bethany (CA)	W 91–50	6–2	Rolle Activity Center (628); Flagstaff, AZ
December 8, 2010*; 6:35 pm		Texas–Pan American	W 68–55	7–2	Rolle Activity Center (417); Flagstaff, AZ
December 11, 2010*; 2:00 pm		at USC	L 52–60	7–3	Galen Center (3,794); Los Angeles, CA
December 16, 2010*; 8:35 pm		at Arizona; Fiesta Bowl Basketball Classic	L 58–63	7–4	McKale Center (13,557); Tucson, AZ
December 22, 2010*; 6:35 pm		Air Force	W 74–63	8–4	Rolle Activity Center; Flagstaff, AZ
December 29, 2010; 1:05 pm		at Montana	L 80–83	8–5 (0–1)	Dahlberg Arena (4,061); Missoula, MT
December 31, 2010; 4:05 pm		at Montana State	L 78–86	8–6 (0–2)	Brick Breeden Fieldhouse (3,305); Bozeman, MT
January 6, 2011; 6:35 pm		Idaho State	W 82–80 ^{OT}	9–6 (1–2)	Rolle Activity Center (607); Flagstaff, AZ
January 8, 2011; 6:35 pm		Weber State	L 67–68	9–7 (1–3)	Rolle Activity Center (703); Flagstaff, AZ
January 15, 2011; 6:35 pm		Sacramento State	W 79–58	10–7 (2–3)	Rolle Activity Center (679); Flagstaff, AZ
January 20, 2011; 7:05 pm		at Eastern Washington	L 59–72	10–8 (2–4)	Reese Court (1,024); Cheney, WA
January 22, 2011; 6:05 pm		at Portland State	W 72–59	11–8 (3–4)	Viking Pavilion (1,082); Portland, OR
January 31, 2011; 6:35 pm		Northern Colorado	W 65–54	12–8 (4–4)	Rolle Activity Center (722); Flagstaff, AZ
February 3, 2011; 6:35 pm		Montana State	W 61–41	13–8 (5–4)	Rolle Activity Center (704); Flagstaff, AZ
February 5, 2011; 6:35 pm		Montana	W 70–53	14–8 (6–4)	Rolle Activity Center (1,064); Flagstaff, AZ
February 10, 2011; 7:05 pm		at Weber State	L 55–82	14–9 (6–5)	Dee Events Center (5,310); Ogden, UT
February 12, 2011; 7:05 pm		at Idaho State	L 88–90 ^{OT}	14–10 (6–6)	Holt Arena (2,128); Pocatello, ID
February 16, 2011; 5:35 pm		Eastern Washington	W 83–74	15–10 (7–6)	Rolle Activity Center (983); Flagstaff, AZ
February 19, 2011*; 7:00 pm		at Cal Poly; ESPN BracketBusters	W 59–56	16–10	Mott Gym (2,474); San Luis Obispo, CA
February 24, 2011; 8:05 pm		at Sacramento State	W 63–42	17–10 (8–6)	Hornets Nest (1,005); Sacramento, CA
February 26, 2011; 7:05 pm		at Northern Colorado	L 71–72	17–11 (8–7)	Butler–Hancock Sports Pavilion (2,755); Greeley, CO
March 2, 2011; 6:35 pm		Portland State	W 79–52	18–11 (9–7)	Rolle Activity Center (812); Flagstaff, AZ
Big Sky tournament
March 5, 2011; 6:35 pm	(4)	(5) Montana State; Big Sky Quarterfinals	W 65–62	19–11	Rolle Activity Center (1,002); Flagstaff, AZ
March 8, 2011; 8:00 pm	(4)	at (1) Northern Colorado; Big Sky Semifinals	L 70–73	19–12	Butler–Hancock Sports Pavilion (3,003); Greeley, CO
CollegeInsider.com tournament
March 15, 2011; 7:00 pm		at Santa Clara; CIT First Round	L 63–68	19–13	Leavey Center (1,309); Santa Clara, CA
*Non-conference game. ^{#}Rankings from AP Poll. (#) Tournament seedings in parentheses. All times are in Eastern Time.
