= 2010–11 Gonzaga Bulldogs men's basketball team =

American college basketball season

2010–11 Gonzaga Bulldogs men's basketball

WCC tournament champions WCC regular season co-champions

NCAA tournament, Round of 32
- Conference: West Coast Conference
- Record: 25–10 (11–3 WCC)
- Head coach: Mark Few (12th season)
- Assistant coaches: Tommy Lloyd (10th season); Ray Giacoletti (4th season); Donny Daniels (1st season)
- Home arena: McCarthey Athletic Center

2010–11 West Coast Conference men's basketball standings
	Conf.				Overall
Team	W		L	PCT	W		L	PCT
Saint Mary's	11	–	3	.786	25	–	9	.735
† Gonzaga	11	–	3	.786	25	–	10	.714
San Francisco	10	–	4	.714	19	–	15	.559
Santa Clara	8	–	6	.571	24	–	14	.632
Portland	7	–	7	.500	20	–	12	.625
Pepperdine	5	–	9	.357	12	–	21	.364
Loyola Marymount	2	–	12	.143	11	–	21	.344
San Diego	2	–	12	.143	6	–	24	.200
† 2011 WCC tournament winner As of March 30, 2011; Rankings from AP Poll

The 2010–11 Gonzaga Bulldogs men's basketball team represented Gonzaga University in the 2010–11 NCAA Division I men's basketball season. The Bulldogs are members of the West Coast Conference, and were led by head coach Mark Few. They played their home games at the McCarthey Athletic Center on the university campus in Spokane, Washington.

The team lost the 2010 WCC Player of the Year Matt Bouldin to graduation, but returned the rest of their starting lineup. Three of the returning players participated in the 2010 FIBA World Championship in Turkey—Elias Harris for Germany and Kelly Olynyk and Robert Sacre for Canada. Gonzaga was the only NCAA school with more than one player involved in the 2010 Worlds.

The Bulldogs finished the 2010–11 season 25–10, 11–3 in WCC play to share the regular season championship with Saint Mary's. They defeated Saint Mary's in the championship game of the 2011 West Coast Conference men's basketball tournament to earn an automatic bid in the 2011 NCAA Division I men's basketball tournament. As the 11 seed in the southeast region, they defeated 6 seed St. John's in the second round before falling to 3 seed Brigham Young in the third round.

== Preseason ==
In 2010–11, the Gonzaga Bulldogs men's basketball team were in their 31st season as a member of the West Coast Conference. Since 2004, the team has played their home games at the McCarthey Athletic Center, which has a capacity of 6,000. In their previous season, a West Coast Conference Preseason poll predicted that the Gonzaga Bulldogs would finish first in the conference.

=== Departures ===
Name	Number	Pos.	Height	Weight	Year	Hometown	Reason for departure
Will Foster	45	C	7'5"	273	Senior	Bonney Lake, Washington	Graduated
Matt Bouldin	15	G	6'5"	224	Senior	Highlands Ranch, Colorado	Graduated
Chris Pontarolo-Magg	4	G	5'11"	175	Senior	Quincy, Washington	Graduated
Bol Kong	34	G	6'6"	220	Sophomore (redshirt)	Vancouver, British Columbia	Transferred to NAIT
Andy Poling	14	F	6'11"	204	Freshman (redshirt)	Portland, Oregon	Transferred to Seattle Pacific
Grant Gibbs	10	G	6'4"	204	Freshman (redshirt)	Marion, Iowa	Transferred to Creighton
G.J. Vilarino	5	G	6'0"	177	Freshman	McKinney, Texas	

=== Incoming transfers ===
Name	Pos.	Height	Weight	Year	Hometown	Previous School	Years Remaining	Date Eligible
Marquise Carter	G	6'4"	178	Junior (redshirt)	San Diego, California	Three Rivers CC	2	Oct. 1, 2010

=== 2010 recruiting class ===
College recruiting
Name	Hometown	School	Height	Weight	Commit date
Keegan Hyland; SG	Portland, Maine	South Portland	6 ft 4 in (1.93 m)	192 lb (87 kg)	Apr 27, 2010
Keegan Hyland; SG	Recruit ratings: Scout: Rivals: 247Sports: ESPN: (84)				
Mathis Keita; SG	Thionville, France	Lycée Marcelin Berthelot/INSEP	6 ft 5 in (1.96 m)	190 lb (86 kg)	May 12, 2010
Mathis Keita; SG	Recruit ratings: Scout: Rivals: 247Sports: ESPN: (NR)				
Mathis Mönninghoff; SF	Ibbenbüren, Germany	Landrat-Lucas-Gymnasium/Bayer Giants	6 ft 7 in (2.01 m)	189 lb (86 kg)	Aug 11, 2010
Mathis Mönninghoff; SF	Recruit ratings: Scout: Rivals: 247Sports: ESPN: (NR)				
Overall recruit ranking: Scout: NR Rivals: NR 247Sports: NR ESPN: NR
Note: In many cases, Scout, Rivals, 247Sports, On3, and ESPN may conflict in their listings of height and weight.; In these cases, the average was taken. ESPN grades are on a 100-point scale.; Sources: "2010 Gonzaga Rivals Commits". Rivals.; "2010 Gonzaga Scout Commits". Scout.; "2010 Gonzaga ESPN Commits". ESPN.; "Scout.com Team Recruiting Rankings". Scout.; "2010 Team Ranking". Rivals.; "2010 Gonzaga 24/7 Sports Commits". 247Sports.

== Roster ==
2010–11 Gonzaga Bulldogs men's basketball team
Players
Coaches

Pos.	#	Name	Height	Weight	Year	Previous school	Hometown
G	41	Steven Gray	6 ft 5 in (1.96 m)	205 lb (93 kg)	Sr	Bainbridge	Irondale, Washington
C	00	Robert Sacre	7 ft 0 in (2.13 m)	260 lb (118 kg)	RS Jr	Handsworth	North Vancouver, British Columbia
G	2	Marquise Carter	6 ft 4 in (1.93 m)	178 lb (81 kg)	RS Jr	Horizon Christian; Three Rivers CC	San Diego, California
G	3	Demetri Goodson	6 ft 0 in (1.83 m)	175 lb (79 kg)	Jr	Klein Collins	Spring, Texas
G	30	Mike Hart	6 ft 6 in (1.98 m)	206 lb (93 kg)	RS So	Jesuit	Portland, Oregon
F	10	Mangisto Arop	6 ft 6 in (1.98 m)	208 lb (94 kg)	So	St. Mary (ON)	Edmonton, Alberta
F	20	Elias Harris	6 ft 7 in (2.01 m)	245 lb (111 kg)	So	Friedrich-Magnus-Schwerd-Gymnasium; BIS Speyer	Speyer, Germany
F	13	Kelly Olynyk	7 ft 0 in (2.13 m)	238 lb (108 kg)	So	South Kamloops	Kamloops, British Columbia
C	35	Sam Dower	6 ft 9 in (2.06 m)	248 lb (112 kg)	RS Fr	Osseo	Brooklyn Park, Minnesota
G	11	David Stockton	5 ft 11 in (1.8 m)	152 lb (69 kg)	RS Fr	Gonzaga Prep	Spokane, Washington
G	25	Mathis Keita	6 ft 5 in (1.96 m)	190 lb (86 kg)	Fr	Lycée Marcelin Berthelot; INSEP	Thionville, France
F	22	Mathis Mönninghoff	6 ft 7 in (2.01 m)	189 lb (86 kg)	Fr	Landrat-Lucas-Gymnasium; Bayer Giants	Ibbenbüren, Germany
G	33	Keegan Hyland (redshirt)	6 ft 4 in (1.93 m)	192 lb (87 kg)	Fr	South Portland	Portland, Maine

Head coach

- Mark Few

Assistant coach(es)

- Tommy Lloyd
- Ray Giacoletti
- Donny Daniels

Legend

- (C) Team captain
- (S) Suspended
- (I) Ineligible
- (W) Walk-on
- Injured
- Current redshirt

Roster
Last update: 2010-11-13

== Rankings ==
Legend
	Improvement in ranking
	Drop in ranking
	Not ranked previous week
RV	Received votes but were not ranked in Top 25 of poll

Poll	Pre	Wk 2	Wk 3	Wk 4	Wk 5	Wk 6	Wk 7	Wk 8	Wk 9	Wk 10	Wk 11	Wk 12	Wk 13	Wk 14
AP	12	11	22	RV	RV	--	RV	RV	RV	RV	RV	--	--	--
Coaches	12	12	18	24	RV	--	--	RV	RV	RV	RV	--	--	--

== Schedule ==
Date time, TV	Rank^{#}	Opponent^{#}	Result	Record	Site (attendance) city, state
Exhibition
2010-10-30*	No. 12	vs. Texas; Secret Scrimmage			Pepsi Center (-); Denver, Colorado
11/05/2010*; 6:00 pm, KHQ-TV/FSN	No. 12	Southern Oregon	W 90–58		McCarthey Athletic Center (6,000); Spokane, Washington
Regular Season
11/12/2010*; 6:00 pm, KHQ/FSN	No. 12	Southern	W 117–72	1–0	McCarthey Athletic Center (6,000); Spokane, Washington
2010-11-14*; 1:00 pm, KHQ/FSN	No. 12	IUPUI; CBE Classic Regional Round	W 86–56	2–0	McCarthey Athletic Center (6,000); Spokane, Washington
2010-11-16*; 8:00 pm, ESPN2	No. 11	No. 25 San Diego State; CBE Classic Regional Round	L 76–79	2–1	McCarthey Athletic Center (6,000); Spokane, Washington
2010-11-22*; 6:30 pm, ESPN2	No. 22	vs. No. 4 Kansas State; CBE Semifinal	L 64–81	2–2	Sprint Center (18,630); Kansas City, Missouri
2010-11-23*; 4:45 pm, ESPNU	No. 22	vs. Marquette; CBE 3rd place game	W 66–63	3–2	Sprint Center (18,966); Kansas City, Missouri
2010-11-30*; 6:00 pm, KHQ/FSN		Eastern Washington	W 86–57	4–2	McCarthey Athletic Center (6,000); Spokane, Washington
12/04/2010*; 2:15 pm, ESPN		vs. No. 20 Illinois; Battle in Seattle	L 61–73	4–3	KeyArena (14,789); Seattle, Washington
12/08/2010*; 8:00 pm, FSN		at Washington State	L 59–81	4–4	Beasley Coliseum (10,177); Pullman, Washington
12/11/2010*; 5:30 pm, ESPN2		at No. 23 Notre Dame	L 79–83	4–5	Edmund P. Joyce Center (8,570); South Bend, Indiana
2010-12-16*; 6:00 pm, KHQ/FSN		Lewis–Clark State	W 103–61	5–5	McCarthey Athletic Center (6,000); Spokane, Washington
2010-12-18*; 1:30 pm, ESPN2		vs. No. 9 Baylor; The Showcase	W 68–64	6–5	American Airlines Center (11,077); Dallas, Texas
2010-12-22*; 12:00 pm, ESPN2		Xavier	W 64–54	7–5	McCarthey Athletic Center (6,000); Spokane, Washington
2010-12-29*; 5:30 pm, KHQ/FSN		Lafayette	W 83–55	8–5	McCarthey Athletic Center (6,000); Spokane, Washington
2010-12-31*; 7:00 pm, ESPN2		Oklahoma State	W 73–52	9–5	McCarthey Athletic Center (6,000); Spokane, Washington
01/02/2011*; 10:00 am, FSN		at Wake Forest	W 73–63	10–5	LJVM Coliseum (11,003); Winston-Salem, North Carolina
01/08/2011; 5:30 pm, KAYU/FSN		Portland	W 74–61	11–5 (1–0)	McCarthey Athletic Center (6,000); Spokane, Washington
2011-01-13; 6:00 pm, KHQ/FSN		Pepperdine	W 92–75	12–5 (2–0)	McCarthey Athletic Center (6,000); Spokane, Washington
2011-01-15; 5:00 pm, KHQ/FSN		Loyola Marymount	W 79–59	13–5 (3–0)	McCarthey Athletic Center (6,000); Spokane, Washington
2011-01-20; 6:00 pm, ESPNU		at Santa Clara	L 71–85	13–6 (3–1)	Leavey Center (4,017); Santa Clara, California
2011-01-22; 5:30 pm, KHQ/FSN		at San Francisco	L 91–96 ^{OT}	13–7 (3–2)	War Memorial Gymnasium (4,195); San Francisco, California
2011-01-27; 8:00 pm, ESPN2		Saint Mary's	L 71–73	13–8 (3–3)	McCarthey Athletic Center (6,000); Spokane, Washington
2011-01-29; 5:00 pm, KHQ/FSN		San Diego	W 86–53	14–8 (4–3)	McCarthey Athletic Center (6,000); Spokane, Washington
02/03/2011; 8:00 pm, ESPN2		at Portland	W 67–64	15–8 (5–3)	Chiles Center (4,852); Portland, Oregon
02/05/2011*; 1:00 pm, ESPN		vs. Memphis; Ronald McDonald House Charities Classic	L 58–62	15–9	Spokane Arena (10,778); Spokane, Washington
02/10/2011; 8:00 pm, ESPN2		at Loyola Marymount	W 67–57	16–9 (6–3)	Gersten Pavilion (2,964); Los Angeles, California
02/12/2011; 7:00 pm, KHQ/FSN		at Pepperdine	W 63–44	17–9 (7–3)	Firestone Fieldhouse (2,484); Malibu, California
2011-02-17; 6:00 pm, KHQ		Santa Clara	W 85–76	18–9 (8–3)	McCarthey Athletic Center (6,000); Spokane, Washington
2011-02-19; 5:00 pm, KHQ/FSN		San Francisco	W 70–53	19–9 (9–3)	McCarthey Athletic Center (6,000); Spokane, Washington
2011-02-24; 8:00 pm, ESPN2		at Saint Mary's	W 89–85 ^{OT}	20–9 (10–3)	McKeon Pavilion (3,500); Moraga, California
2011-02-26; 6:00 pm, KHQ/FSN		at San Diego	W 68–31	21–9 (11–3)	Jenny Craig Pavilion (3,882); San Diego, California
2011-02-28*; 6:00 pm, KHQ/FSN		Cal State Bakersfield	W 96–49	22–9	McCarthey Athletic Center (6,000); Spokane, Washington
2011 West Coast Conference men's basketball tournament
03/06/2011; 7:30 pm, ESPN2	(2)	vs. (3) San Francisco; Semifinals	W 71–67	23–9	Orleans Arena (7,489); Paradise, Nevada
03/07/2011; 6:00 pm, ESPN	(2)	vs. (1) Saint Mary's; Championship Game	W 75–63	24–9	Orleans Arena (7,186); Paradise, Nevada
2011 NCAA Division I men's basketball tournament
2011-03-17*; 6:45 pm, CBS	(11 SE)	vs. (6 SE) No. 18 St. John's; Second Round	W 86–71	25–9	Pepsi Center (19,216); Denver, Colorado
2011-03-19*; 4:45 pm, CBS	(11 SE)	vs. (3 SE) No. 10 BYU; Third Round	L 67–89	25–10	Pepsi Center (19,328); Denver, Colorado
*Non-conference game. ^{#}Rankings from AP Poll. (#) Tournament seedings in parentheses. SE=NCAA Southeast Region. All times are in Pacific Time.
