= 2010–11 San Francisco Dons men's basketball team =

American college basketball season

2010–11 San Francisco Dons men's basketball

CIT, Quarterfinals
- Conference: West Coast Conference
- Record: 19–15 (10–4 WCC)
- Head coach: Rex Walters (3rd season)
- Associate head coach: Danny Yoshikawa (3rd season)
- Assistant coaches: Michael Lee (1st season); Justin Bauman (1st season)
- Home arena: War Memorial Gymnasium

2010–11 West Coast Conference men's basketball standings
	Conf.				Overall
Team	W		L	PCT	W		L	PCT
Saint Mary's	11	–	3	.786	25	–	9	.735
† Gonzaga	11	–	3	.786	25	–	10	.714
San Francisco	10	–	4	.714	19	–	15	.559
Santa Clara	8	–	6	.571	24	–	14	.632
Portland	7	–	7	.500	20	–	12	.625
Pepperdine	5	–	9	.357	12	–	21	.364
Loyola Marymount	2	–	12	.143	11	–	21	.344
San Diego	2	–	12	.143	6	–	24	.200
† 2011 WCC tournament winner As of March 30, 2011; Rankings from AP Poll

The 2010–11 San Francisco Dons men's basketball team represented the University of San Francisco in the 2010–11 NCAA Division I men's basketball season. The Dons, led by head coach Rex Walters, played their home games at War Memorial Gymnasium in San Francisco, California, as members of the West Coast Conference. The Dons finished 3rd in the West Coast Conference during the regular season, and were eliminated in the semifinals of the WCC tournament by Gonzaga.

San Francisco failed to qualify for the NCAA tournament, but were invited to the 2011 CIT. The Dons won their first two games of the CIT to advance to the quarterfinals, where they were eliminated by WCC rival and eventual tournament champions Santa Clara, 95–91.

== Roster ==
2010–11 San Francisco Dons men's basketball team
Players
Coaches

Pos.	#	Name	Height	Weight	Year	Hometown
F	1	Charles Standifer	6 ft 5 in (1.96 m)	185 lb (84 kg)	Fr	Sacramento, California
G	3	Dominique O'Connor	5 ft 10 in (1.78 m)	165 lb (75 kg)	RS Fr	Los Angeles, California
G	5	Michael Williams	6 ft 0 in (1.83 m)	170 lb (77 kg)	So	Van Nuys, California
G	10	Marko Petrovic	6 ft 2 in (1.88 m)	200 lb (91 kg)	Fr	Zagreb, Croatia
C	11	Justin Raffington	6 ft 9 in (2.06 m)	225 lb (102 kg)	Fr	Bad Krozingen, Germany
G	13	Rashad Green	6 ft 4 in (1.93 m)	195 lb (88 kg)	Jr	North Babylon, New York
C	21	Moustapha Diarra	6 ft 10 in (2.08 m)	235 lb (107 kg)	Sr	Marseille, France
F	22	Perris Blackwell	6 ft 9 in (2.06 m)	240 lb (109 kg)	So	Etiwanda, California
F	23	Khalil Murphy	6 ft 7 in (2.01 m)	235 lb (107 kg)	Fr	Willingboro, New Jersey
F	25	Cole Dickerson	6 ft 7 in (2.01 m)	225 lb (102 kg)	Fr	Federal Way, Washington
G	30	Jay Wey	6 ft 2 in (1.88 m)	185 lb (84 kg)	Jr	Cupertino, California
F	31	Antoine Roy–Condron	6 ft 8 in (2.03 m)	210 lb (95 kg)	Fr	Long Beach, California
F	32	Angelo Caloiaro	6 ft 8 in (2.03 m)	225 lb (102 kg)	Jr	Saratoga, California
G	33	Avery Johnson	6 ft 3 in (1.91 m)	180 lb (82 kg)	Fr	Huntington Beach, California
G	35	Chad Eppley	6 ft 1 in (1.85 m)	165 lb (75 kg)	Jr	Boone, North Carolina
G	45	Cody Doolin	6 ft 2 in (1.88 m)	170 lb (77 kg)	Fr	Austin, Texas

Head coach

- Rex Walters (Kansas)

Assistant coach(es)

- Danny Yoshikawa (UC Davis)
- Michael Lee (Kansas)
- Justin Bauman (Kansas)

Legend

- (C) Team captain
- (S) Suspended
- (I) Ineligible
- (W) Walk-on
- Injured
- Current redshirt

Roster
Last update: January 21, 2023

== Schedule and results ==
Date time, TV	Rank^{#}	Opponent^{#}	Result	Record	Site (attendance) city, state
Exhibition
November 7, 2010*; 2:00 pm		Menlo	W 95–62	—	War Memorial Gymnasium; San Francisco, CA
Regular season
November 12, 2010*; 8:00 pm		Seattle	W 97–76	1–0	War Memorial Gymnasium (1,714); San Francisco, CA
November 17, 2010*; 7:00 pm		at San Jose State	L 64–74	1–1	Event Center Arena (2,116); San Jose, CA
November 20, 2010*; 7:00 pm		Colorado	W 83–81 ^{OT}	2–1	War Memorial Gymnasium (2,747); San Francisco, CA
November 24, 2010*; 6:00 pm		at Montana State	L 59–76	2–2	Brick Breeden Fieldhouse (2,704); Bozeman, MT
November 27, 2010*; 2:00 pm		Loyola Chicago	L 62–63	2–3	War Memorial Gymnasium (1,235); San Francisco, CA
December 1, 2010*; 7:00 pm		Holy Names	W 89–86	3–3	War Memorial Gymnasium (1,116); San Francisco, CA
December 4, 2010*; 7:00 pm		at Cal State Bakersfield	L 69–77	3–4	Rabobank Arena (1,420); Bakersfield, CA
December 8, 2010*; 4:00 pm		at No. 24 Louisville	L 35–61	3–5	KFC Yum! Center (21,049); Louisville, KY
December 12, 2010*; 1:00 pm		Montana	W 50–48 ^{OT}	4–5	War Memorial Gymnasium (1,676); San Francisco, CA
December 18, 2010*; 7:00 pm		at Washington	L 52–80	4–6	Hec Edmundson Pavilion (9,807); Seattle, Washington
December 21, 2010*; 7:00 pm		vs. No. 7 San Diego State; Las Vegas Holiday Hoops Classic	L 56–62	4–7	South Point Arena (1,202); Enterprise, NV
December 23, 2010*; 7:00 pm		vs. IUPUI; Las Vegas Holiday Hoops Classic	L 68–69	4–8	South Point Arena; Enterprise, NV
December 28, 2010*; 7:00 pm		Colorado State; Hilltop Challenge	L 61–69	4–9	War Memorial Gymnasium (1,784); San Francisco, CA
December 30, 2010*; 7:00 pm		Hampton; Hilltop Challenge	W 69–57	5–9	War Memorial Gymnasium (1,490); San Francisco, CA
January 1, 2011*; 5:00 pm		Dominican; Hilltop Challenge	W 68–47	6–9	War Memorial Gymnasium (1,476); San Francisco, CA
January 8, 2011; 7:00 pm		at Santa Clara	W 74–67	7–9 (1–0)	Leavey Center (3,159); Santa Clara, CA
January 13, 2011; 7:30 pm		at Saint Mary's	L 57–71	7–10 (1–1)	McKeon Pavilion (3,500); Moraga, CA
January 15, 2011; 6:00 pm		at San Diego	W 65–55	8–10 (2–1)	Jenny Craig Pavilion (1,774); San Diego, CA
January 20, 2011; 7:30 pm		Portland	W 81–74	9–10 (3–1)	War Memorial Gymnasium (1,819); San Francisco, CA
January 22, 2011; 5:00 pm		Gonzaga	W 96–91 ^{OT}	10–10 (4–1)	War Memorial Gymnasium (4,195); San Francisco, CA
January 27, 2011; 7:00 pm		at Loyola Marymount	W 61–60	11–10 (5–1)	Gersten Pavilion (1,631); Los Angeles, CA
January 29, 2011; 7:00 pm		at Pepperdine	L 88–94	11–11 (5–2)	Firestone Fieldhouse (1,685); Malibu, CA
February 5, 2011; 7:00 pm		Santa Clara	W 68–62	12–11 (6–2)	War Memorial Gymnasium (3,978); San Francisco, CA
February 10, 2011; 7:30 pm		San Diego	W 61–47	13–11 (7–2)	War Memorial Gymnasium (2,242); San Francisco, CA
February 12, 2011; 7:30 pm		Saint Mary's	L 68–86	13–12 (7–3)	War Memorial Gymnasium (4,500); San Francisco, CA
February 17, 2011; 6:00 pm		at Portland	W 82–73	14–12 (8–3)	Chiles Center (2,538); Portland, OR
February 19, 2011; 5:00 pm		at Gonzaga	L 53–70	14–13 (8–4)	McCarthey Athletic Center (6,000); Spokane, WA
February 24, 2011; 7:00 pm		Pepperdine	W 79–78 ^{OT}	15–13 (9–4)	War Memorial Gymnasium (1,477); San Francisco, CA
February 26, 2011; 7:00 pm		Loyola Marymount	W 77–75	16–13 (10–4)	War Memorial Gymnasium (2,474); San Francisco, CA
WCC tournament
March 5, 2011; 8:30 pm	(3)	vs. (6) Pepperdine; WCC Quarterfinals	W 76–59	17–13	Orleans Arena (7,045); Las Vegas, NV
March 5, 2011; 7:30 pm	(3)	vs. (2) Gonzaga; WCC Semifinals	L 67–71	17–14	Orleans Arena (7,489); Las Vegas, NV
CollegeInsider.com tournament
March 16, 2011; 7:00 pm		Idaho; CIT First Round	W 81–73	18–14	War Memorial Gymnasium (1,879); San Francisco, CA
March 19, 2011; 10:00 pm		at Hawaii; CIT Second Round	W 77–74	19–14	Stan Sheriff Center (6,491); Honolulu, HI
March 22, 2011; 7:00 pm		Santa Clara; CIT Quarterfinals	L 91–95	19–15	War Memorial Gymnasium (2,615); San Francisco, CA
*Non-conference game. ^{#}Rankings from AP Poll. (#) Tournament seedings in parentheses. All times are in Pacific Time.
