= 2010–11 Weber State Wildcats men's basketball team =

American college basketball season

2010–11 Weber State Wildcats men's basketball

CBI, First round
- Conference: Big Sky Conference
- Record: 18–14 (11–5 Big Sky)
- Head coach: Randy Rahe (5th season)
- Associate head coach: Eric Duft (5th season)
- Assistant coaches: Phil Beckner (1st season); Tim Gardner (5th season)
- Home arena: Dee Events Center

2010–11 Big Sky men's basketball standings
	Conf.				Overall
Team	W		L	PCT	W		L	PCT
Northern Colorado †	13	–	3	.813	21	–	11	.656
Montana	12	–	4	.750	21	–	11	.656
Weber State	11	–	5	.688	18	–	14	.563
Northern Arizona	9	–	7	.563	19	–	13	.594
Montana State	7	–	9	.438	13	–	18	.419
Eastern Washington	7	–	9	.438	10	–	20	.333
Portland State	5	–	11	.313	14	–	16	.467
Idaho State	4	–	12	.250	9	–	20	.310
Sacramento State	4	–	12	.250	7	–	21	.250
† Conference tournament winner

The 2010–11 Weber State Wildcats men's basketball team represented Weber State University in the 2010–11 NCAA Division I men's basketball season. The Wildcats, led by head coach Randy Rahe, played their home games at the Dee Events Center in Ogden, Utah, as members of the Big Sky Conference. The Wildcats finished the regular season 3rd in the Big Sky, and won their first game in the Big Sky tournament. Weber State was eliminated in the semifinals of the tournament by Montana.

Weber State failed to qualify for the NCAA tournament, but were invited to the 2011 College Basketball Invitational. The Wildcats were eliminated in the first round of the CBI in a loss to eventual tournament champion Oregon, 68–59.

== Roster ==
2010–11 Weber State Wildcats men's basketball team
Players
Coaches

Pos.	#	Name	Height	Weight	Year	Hometown
G	1	Damian Lillard	6 ft 2 in (1.88 m)	185 lb (84 kg)	Jr	Oakland, California
G/F	2	B. J. Porter	6 ft 3 in (1.91 m)	190 lb (86 kg)	Jr	Layton, Utah
F	3	Kyle Bullinger	6 ft 6 in (1.98 m)	215 lb (98 kg)	Jr	Mountain View, Wyoming
G/F	4	Scott Bamforth	6 ft 2 in (1.88 m)	190 lb (86 kg)	So	Albuquerque, New Mexico
G	5	Jordan Richardson	6 ft 1 in (1.85 m)	180 lb (82 kg)	Fr	Lewisville, Texas
F	13	Frank Otis	6 ft 6 in (1.98 m)	230 lb (104 kg)	Jr	Oakland, California
G	15	Lindsey Hughey	6 ft 3 in (1.91 m)	200 lb (91 kg)	Sr	Grand Prairie, Texas
F	21	Nicholas Dupont	6 ft 6 in (1.98 m)	210 lb (95 kg)	Fr	Dayton, Ohio
F	25	Byron Fulton	6 ft 7 in (2.01 m)	220 lb (100 kg)	RS Fr	Phoenix, Arizona
F	30	Darin Mahoney	6 ft 8 in (2.03 m)	225 lb (102 kg)	Jr	Heber City, Utah
F	40	Blake Davis	6 ft 5 in (1.96 m)	210 lb (95 kg)	RS Fr	Phoenix, Arizona
C	44	Kyle Tresnak	6 ft 10 in (2.08 m)	250 lb (113 kg)	Fr	Scottsdale, Arizona
C	45	James Hajek	6 ft 10 in (2.08 m)	250 lb (113 kg)	Fr	Omaha, Nebraska
C	55	Trevor Morris	6 ft 9 in (2.06 m)	240 lb (109 kg)	Sr	Nampa, Idaho

Head coach

- Randy Rahe (Buena Vista)

Assistant coach(es)

- Eric Duft (Sterling (KS))
- Phil Beckner (Kansas Wesleyan)
- Tim Gardner (Puget Sound)

Legend

- (C) Team captain
- (S) Suspended
- (I) Ineligible
- (W) Walk-on
- Injured
- Current redshirt

Roster
Last update: January 28, 2023

== Schedule and results ==
Date time, TV	Rank^{#}	Opponent^{#}	Result	Record	Site (attendance) city, state
Exhibition
November 1, 2010*; 7:00 pm		Laval	W 86–57	—	Dee Events Center; Ogden, UT
November 6, 2010*; 4:00 pm		Western New Mexico	W 94–78	—	Dee Events Center; Ogden, UT
Regular season
November 13, 2010*; 7:00 pm		at Utah State	L 65–77	0–1	Smith Spectrum (9,014); Logan, UT
November 16, 2010*; 5:30 pm		Colorado Christian	W 97–73	1–1	Dee Events Center (3,919); Ogden, UT
November 20, 2010*; 4:00 pm		at Utah	L 75–90	1–2	Jon M. Huntsman Center (7,836); Salt Lake City, Utah
November 25, 2010*; 9:30 pm		at Alaska Anchorage; Great Alaska Shootout	W 86–54	2–2	Sullivan Arena (4,909); Anchorage, AK
November 26, 2010*; 10:00 pm		vs. Arizona State; Great Alaska Shootout	L 58–59	2–3	Sullivan Arena (5,038); Anchorage, AK
November 27, 2010*; 5:30 pm		vs. Drake; Great Alaska Shootout	W 82–81	3–3	Sullivan Arena (5,404); Anchorage, AK
December 4, 2010*; 2:00 pm		Seattle	W 65–61	4–3	Dee Events Center (4,390); Ogden, UT
December 11, 2010*; 7:30 pm		at Southern Utah	W 77–71	5–3	Centrum Arena (2,704); Cedar City, UT
December 16, 2010*; 6:00 pm		at Tulsa	L 79–81 ^{OT}	5–4	Reynolds Center (4,609); Tulsa, OK
December 18, 2010*; 7:30 pm		Southwest	W 94–54	6–4	Dee Events Center (4,697); Ogden, UT
December 21, 2010*; 7:00 pm		No. 23 BYU	L 66–72	6–5	Dee Events Center (10,453); Ogden, UT
December 29, 2010; 7:00 pm		at Montana State	L 72–75	6–6 (0–1)	Brick Breeden Fieldhouse (3,267); Bozeman, MT
December 31, 2010; 1:05 pm		at Montana	L 56–75	6–7 (0–2)	Dahlberg Arena (4,606); Missoula, MT
January 8, 2011; 6:30 pm		at Northern Arizona	W 68–67	7–7 (1–2)	Rolle Activity Center (703); Flagstaff, AZ
January 13, 2011; 7:00 pm		Sacramento State	W 84–71	8–7 (2–2)	Dee Events Center (4,688); Ogden, UT
January 15, 2011; 7:00 pm		Idaho State	W 71–67	9–7 (3–2)	Dee Events Center (7,124); Ogden, UT
January 20, 2011; 8:00 pm		at Portland State	L 69–71	9–8 (3–3)	Stott Pavilion (928); Portland, OR
January 22, 2011; 7:00 pm		at Northern Colorado	L 46–65	9–9 (3–4)	Buter–Hancock Sports Pavilion (2,299); Greeley, CO
January 29, 2011; 7:00 pm		Northern Colorado	W 72–71	10–9 (4–4)	Dee Events Center (7,505); Ogden, UT
February 3, 2011; 7:00 pm		Montana	W 68–52	11–9 (5–4)	Dee Events Center (5,759); Ogden, UT
February 5, 2011; 7:00 pm		Montana State	L 58–78	12–9 (6–4)	Dee Events Center (6,159); Ogden, UT
February 10, 2011; 7:00 pm		Northern Arizona	W 82–55	13–9 (7–4)	Dee Events Center (5,310); Ogden, UT
February 12, 2011; 8:00 pm		at Eastern Washington	W 80–68	14–9 (8–4)	Reese Court (1,122); Cheney, WA
February 16, 2011; 7:00 pm		Portland State	W 80–58	15–9 (9–4)	Dee Events Center (5,805); Ogden, UT
February 19, 2011*; 6:05 pm		at San Jose State; ESPN BracketBusters	L 46–62	15–10	Event Center Arena (1,243); San Jose, CA
February 22, 2011; 7:00 pm		at Idaho State	W 63–39	16–10 (10–4)	Holt Arena (2,115); Pocatello, ID
February 26, 2011; 8:00 pm		at Sacramento State	W 73–70	17–10 (11–4)	Hornets Nest (855); Sacramento, CA
March 2, 2011; 8:05 pm		Eastern Washington	L 59–75	17–11 (11–5)	Dee Events Center (6,261); Ogden, UT
Big Sky tournament
March 5, 2011; 7:30 pm	(3)	(6) Eastern Washington; Big Sky Quarterfinals	W 79–70	18–11	Dee Events Center (3,683); Ogden, UT
March 8, 2011; 5:30 pm	(3)	vs. (2) Montana; Big Sky Semifinals	L 40–57	18–12	Butler–Hancock Sports Pavilion; Greeley, CO
Regular season (game added 2/21/11)
March 11, 2011*; 8:00 pm		at Saint Mary's	L 54–77	18–13	McKeon Pavilion (3,500); Moraga, CA
CBI
March 16, 2011; 8:00 pm		at Oregon; CBI First Round	L 59–68	18–14	Matthew Knight Arena (4,375); Eugene, OR
*Non-conference game. ^{#}Rankings from AP Poll. (#) Tournament seedings in parentheses. All times are in Mountain Time.
