= Kerry Keating =

American college basketball coach

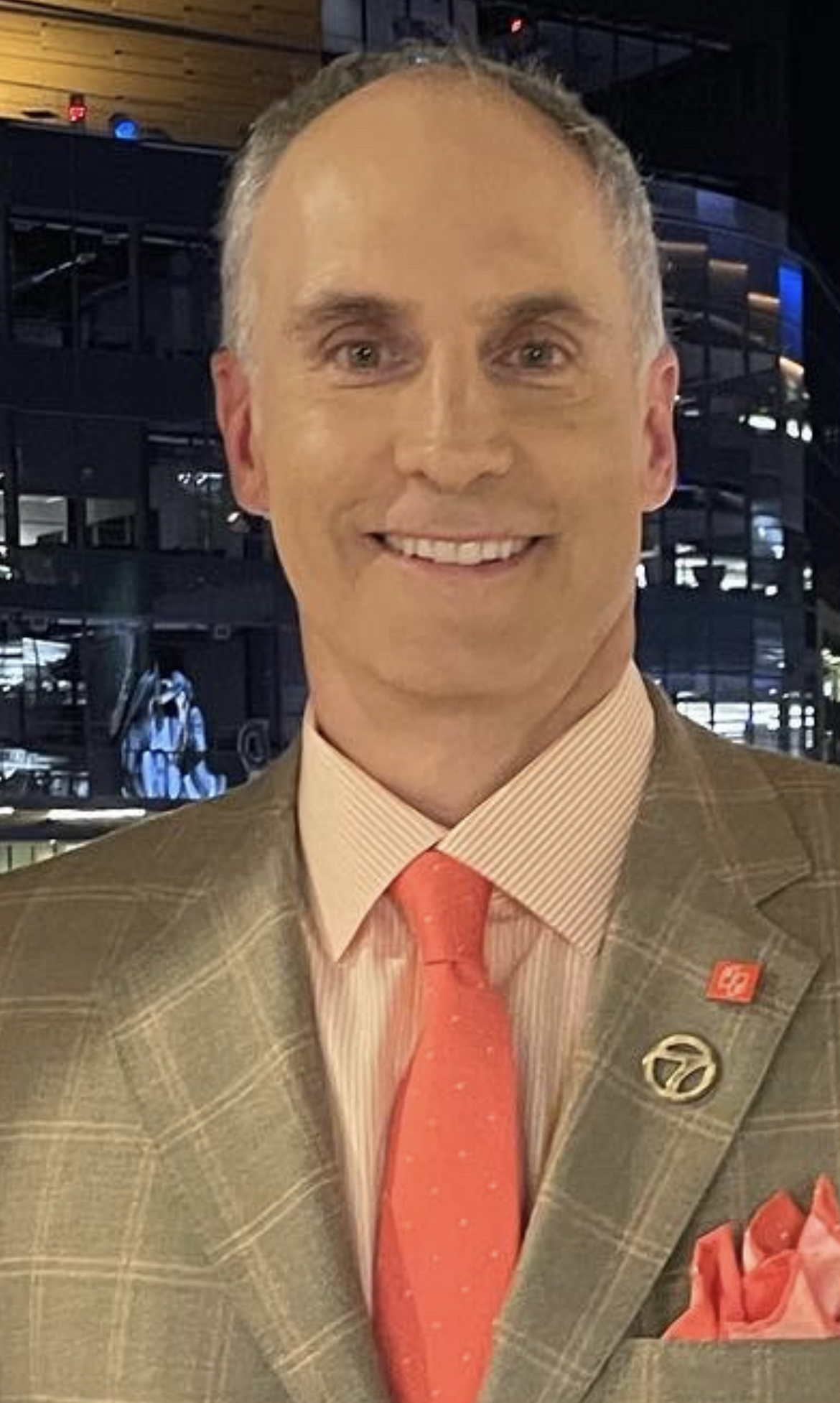
- Keating in 2024

Biographical details
- Born: July 15, 1971 (age 55); Stoughton, Massachusetts, U.S.
- Education: Seton Hall ('93)

Playing career
- 1989–1990: Seton Hall

Coaching career (HC unless noted)
- 1994–1995: Vanderbilt (asst.)
- 1995–1998: Seton Hall (asst.)
- 1998–2000: Appalachian State (asst.)
- 2000–2001: Tulsa (asst.)
- 2001–2003: Tennessee (asst.)
- 2003–2007: UCLA (asst.)
- 2007–2016: Santa Clara

Administrative career (AD unless noted)
- 1990–1993: Seton Hall (video coor.)
- 1993–1994: Wake Forest (administrative asst.)

Head coaching record
- Overall: 139–159 (.466)
- Tournaments: 4–0 (CBI); 5–0 (CIT)

Accomplishments and honors

Championships
- CIT (2011); CBI (2013)

Kerry Keating (born July 15, 1971) is an American college basketball coach and the former head men's basketball coach at Santa Clara University.

== Early life and college education ==
Keating was born in Stoughton, Massachusetts, and grew up in Rockville Centre, on New York's Long Island. He attended Archbishop Molloy High School in Queens and Seton Hall Preparatory School in West Orange, New Jersey.

Keating enrolled at Seton Hall University in 1989 and played on the Seton Hall Pirates men's basketball team as a walk-on as a freshman under coach P. J. Carlesimo. The following year, Keating became a student assistant and video coordinator on Carlesimo's staff. Keating graduated from Seton Hall in 1993.

== Coaching career ==
Keating served as an administrative assistant for Wake Forest head coach Dave Odom in the 1993–94 season. The following season, Keating joined Jan van Breda Kolff's staff at Vanderbilt as an assistant coach. Keating then returned to Seton Hall University in 1995 to be an assistant coach for three seasons, first under George Blaney, then under Tommy Amaker.

Having previously worked with Buzz Peterson as an assistant coach at Vanderbilt, Keating became an assistant coach under Peterson at Appalachian State in 1998. Keating would follow Peterson to Tulsa in 2000 and Tennessee in 2001.

In 2003, Keating joined Ben Howland's staff at UCLA. Rivals.com ranked Keating as one of the nation's best recruiters of incoming talent in 2005. These accomplishments and reputation helped Keating become the 14th head coach of Santa Clara when the school decided to replace longtime coach Dick Davey.

Keating signed a six-year contract through 2013 at his hiring and was extended for two years through the 2014–15 season in 2011. In October 2013, Keating signed a multi-year contract extension. He is Santa Clara University's second highest paid employee.

He has led Santa Clara to the 2011 CollegeInsider.com Tournament and the 2013 College Basketball Invitational championships. Santa Clara is the first school to win both the CIT and CBI titles.

Keating left Santa Clara after a nine-year tenure that saw him go 139–159 overall, and 53–88 in the WCC.

=== Post-Coaching ===
After leaving Santa Clara University, Kerry was a scouting consultant for the Houston Rockets. Kerry regularly appears as an analyst for ABC7 KGO-TV "After The Game" NBA live post-game show in San Francisco. He regularly advises tech startups through his consulting company, The Vinculum Group. Some of his companies include Hot Mic, TaskHuman, FanWide, Boost, SocialVenu, Mojo Vision, Adapt Inc., and Versalume.

== Head coaching record ==
Record table
Season	Team	Overall	Conference	Standing	Postseason
Santa Clara Broncos (West Coast Conference) (2007–2016)
2007–08	Santa Clara	15–16	6–8	4th	
2008–09	Santa Clara	16–17	7–7	4th	
2009–10	Santa Clara	11–21	3–11	T–6th	
2010–11	Santa Clara	24–14	8–6	4th	CIT Champion
2011–12	Santa Clara	8–22	0–16	9th	
2012–13	Santa Clara	26–12	9–7	4th	CBI Champion
2013–14	Santa Clara	14–19	6–12	T–8th	
2014–15	Santa Clara	14–18	7–11	T–6th	
2015–16	Santa Clara	11–20	7–11	6th	
Santa Clara:		139–159 (.466)	53–88 (.376)		
Total:		139–159 (.466)			
National champion Postseason invitational champion Conference regular season champion Conference regular season and conference tournament champion Division regular season champion Division regular season and conference tournament champion Conference tournament champion
