= B. J. Hill (basketball) =

American basketball coach (born 1973)

Biographical details
- Born: May 17, 1973 (age 53)

Playing career
- ?: North Iowa Area CC; Grand View College

Coaching career (HC unless noted)
- 1997–1998: North Iowa Area CC (assistant)
- 1998–1999: Independence CC (assistant)
- 1999–2000: South Dakota State (assistant)
- 2000–2005: Coffeyville CC (assistant)
- 2005–2006: Indian Hills CC (assistant)
- 2006–2010: Northern Colorado (assistant)
- 2010–2016: Northern Colorado

Head coaching record
- Overall: 86–98

Accomplishments and honors

Championships
- Big Sky tournament (2011); Big Sky regular season (2011)

Awards
- Big Sky Coach of the Year (2011)

Benjamin Joseph Hill (born May 17, 1973) is an American college basketball coach and former head men's basketball coach at the University of Northern Colorado.

== Career ==
He began coaching the Bears in 2010–11, when he guided them to the school's first-ever NCAA Division I tournament berth, where they would lose in the Round of 64. He won the Big Sky Conference Coach of the Year that season.

Hill was fired on April 21, 2016 following an NCAA investigation into possible rules violations. He was found to have personally completed coursework for a prospect and enlisted a trainer to do the same. In addition, nine members of his staff completed coursework for players, paid for prospects' classes, and arranged for off-campus practices with an academically ineligible player. In December 2017, Hill received a six-year show-cause penalty, effectively banning him from coaching at an NCAA member school during that time.

== Head coaching record ==
Record table
Season	Team	Overall	Conference	Standing	Postseason
Northern Colorado Bears (Big Sky Conference) (2010–2016)
2010–11	Northern Colorado	21–11	13–3	1st	NCAA Division I Round of 64
2011–12	Northern Colorado	9–19	5–11	7th	
2012–13	Northern Colorado	13–18	10–10	4th	
2013–14	Northern Colorado	18–14	11–9	5th	CIT First round
2014–15	Northern Colorado	15–15	10–8	5th	
2015–16	Northern Colorado	10–21	7–11	9th	
Northern Colorado:		86–98	56–52		
Total:		86–98			
National champion Postseason invitational champion Conference regular season champion Conference regular season and conference tournament champion Division regular season champion Division regular season and conference tournament champion Conference tournament champion
