= New Zealand NBL Most Outstanding Kiwi Forward/Centre Award =

The National Basketball League Most Outstanding Kiwi Forward/Centre is an annual National Basketball League (NBL) award given since the 1985 New Zealand NBL season to the best performing New Zealand player of the regular season who is classified as a forward or centre. The winner of the award receives the Stan Hill Trophy, which is named in honour of Stan Hill, a former NBL player and coach who represented the New Zealand men's national basketball team during the 1970s and 1980s. Hill also won the league's inaugural Most Outstanding Forward Award in 1982.

== Winners ==
Denotes players that also won the overall Most Outstanding Forward that season.
Denotes the year a separate non-restricted player won the overall Most Outstanding Forward.

Year	Player	Team
1985	Stan Hill	Auckland
1986	John Saker	Wellington Saints
1987	Glen Denham	Waikato Warriors
1988	Glen Denham (2)	Waikato Warriors
1989	Neil Stephens	Wellington Saints
1990	Glen Denham (3)	Canterbury Rams
1991	Peter Pokai	Hutt Valley Lakers
1992	Neil Stephens (2)	Wellington Saints
1993	Neil Stephens (3)	Auckland Stars
1994	Pero Cameron	Auckland Stars
1995	Pero Cameron (2)	Auckland Stars
1996	Pero Cameron (3)	Auckland Stars
1997	Willie Burton	Hawke's Bay Hawks
1998	Pero Cameron (4)	Auckland Rebels
1999	Pero Cameron (5)	Auckland Rebels
2000	Tony Rampton	Nelson Giants
2001	Terrence Lewis	Wellington Saints
2002	Ed Book	Nelson Giants
2003	Dillon Boucher	Waikato Titans
2004	Adrian Majstrovich	Hawke's Bay Hawks
2005	Mika Vukona	Nelson Giants
2006	Casey Frank	Auckland Stars
2007	Link Abrams	Taranaki Mountainairs
2008	Casey Frank (2)	Auckland Stars
2009	Thomas Abercrombie	Waikato Pistons
2010	Thomas Abercrombie (2)	Waikato Pistons
2011	Alex Pledger	Waikato Pistons
2012	Nick Horvath	Manawatu Jets
2013	B. J. Anthony	Otago Nuggets
2014	Duane Bailey	Super City Rangers
2015	Josh Duinker	Nelson Giants
2016	Marcel Jones	Canterbury Rams
2017	Marcel Jones (2)	Canterbury Rams
2018	Finn Delany	Nelson Giants
2019	Robert Loe	Wellington Saints
2020	N/A	N/A
2021	Sam Timmins	Otago Nuggets
2022	Robert Loe (2)	Auckland Tuatara
2023	Robert Loe (3)	Auckland Tuatara
2024	Robert Loe (4)	Auckland Tuatara
2025	Carlin Davison	Taranaki Airs
2026	Sam Timmins (2)	Southland Sharks

== See also ==
- List of National Basketball League (New Zealand) awards
