= New Zealand NBL Youth Player of the Year Award =

The National Basketball League Youth Player of the Year is an annual National Basketball League (NBL) award given in various iterations since the 1986 New Zealand NBL season to the best performing young New Zealander of the regular season. The award was originally known as Young Player of the Year from 1986 until 1991. Between 1992 and 2004, the award was called Rookie of the Year. A slight adjustment to the rules saw the Young Player of the Year return in 2005. The award changed back to Rookie of the Year in 2006 and remained every year until it was not awarded in 2017. Rookie of the Year returned in 2018 but was then replaced by Youth Player of the Year in 2019 and has remained since.

The 2011 Rookie of the Year, Steven Adams, went on to make the NBA. He is the half-brother of two-time Young Player of the Year, Warren Adams.

In 2024, the Youth Player of the Year was awarded to Australian import and league MVP, Lachlan Olbrich.

== Winners ==
| Year | Player | Team |
|---|---|---|
| 1986 | Tony Compain | Ponsonby |
| 1987 | Glen Denham | Waikato Warriors |
| 1988 | Warren Adams | New Plymouth Bulls |
| 1989 | John Adie | Auckland |
| 1990 | Kent Mori | Palmerston North Jets |
| 1991 | Warren Adams (2) | Hutt Valley Lakers |
| 1992 | Pero Cameron | Waikato Warriors |
| 1993 | Mark Dickel | Otago Nuggets |
| 1994 | Konrad Ross | Waikato Warriors |
| 1995 | Rob Tuilave | Palmerston North Jets |
| 1996 | Paora Winitana | North Harbour Vikings |
| 1997 | Brendon Polyblank | Palmerston North Jets |
| 1998 | Kirk Penney | North Harbour Kings |
| 1999 | Tony Rampton | Taranaki Oilers |
| 2000 | Arthur Trousdell | Canterbury Rams |
| 2001 | Damon Rampton | Nelson Giants |
| 2002 | Miles Pearce | Manawatu Jets |
| 2003 | Adrian Majstrovich | Hawke's Bay Hawks |
| 2004 | Luke Martin | Manawatu Jets |
| 2005 | Jarrod Kenny | Harbour Heat |
| 2006 | Shaun Tilby | Otago Nuggets |
| 2007 | Charlie Piho | Auckland Stars |
| 2008 | Tyrone Davey | Auckland Stars |
| 2009 | Thomas Abercrombie | Waikato Pistons |
| 2010 | Martin Iti | Southland Sharks |
| 2011 | Steven Adams | Wellington Saints |
| 2012 | Reuben Te Rangi | Harbour Heat |
| 2013 | Tai Webster | Waikato Pistons |
| 2014 | Richie Edwards | Canterbury Rams |
| 2015 | Josh Duinker | Nelson Giants |
| 2016 | Logan Elers | Taranaki Mountainairs |
| 2017 | N/A | N/A |
| 2018 | Max Darling | Canterbury Rams |
| 2019 | Tyrell Harrison | Nelson Giants |
| 2020 | Taane Samuel | Manawatu Jets |
| 2021 | Zach Riley | Auckland Huskies |
| 2022 | Dontae Russo-Nance | Auckland Tuatara |
| 2023 | Walter Brown | Canterbury Rams |
| 2024 | Lachlan Olbrich | Canterbury Rams |
| 2025 | Jackson Ball | Hawke's Bay Hawks |
| 2026 | Jake Holmes | Canterbury Rams |

== See also ==
- List of National Basketball League (New Zealand) awards
