= New Zealand NBL Best Team Free Throws =

The National Basketball League's Best Team Free Throws honour is awarded annually to the National Basketball League (NBL) team with the best free throw percentage during the regular season. It was first awarded in the league's inaugural season in 1982. The award went on a three-year hiatus between 2019 and 2021, before being brought back in 2022 and remaining in 2023, 2024, and 2025. The winning team receives the Nial Forsyth Trophy.

== Winners ==
Year	Team	%
1982	Palmerston North Jets	
1983	Porirua	
1984	Centrals	
1985	Palmerston North Jets (2)	
1986	Wellington Saints	
1987	New Plymouth Bulls	
1988	Auckland	
1989	Hawke's Bay Hawks	
1990	New Plymouth Bulls (2)	
1991	Wellington Saints (2)	
1992	New Plymouth Bears (3)	
1993	Hutt Valley Lakers	
1994	North Harbour Vikings	
1995	Palmerston North Jets (3)	
1996	Wellington Saints (3)	
1997	Waikato Warriors	
1998	Wellington Saints (4)	
1999	Waikato Warriors (2)	
2000	Wellington Saints (5)	
2001	Wellington Saints (6)	
2002	Otago Nuggets	
2003	Auckland Stars (2)	
2004	Wellington Saints (7)	
2005	Nelson Giants	
2006	Auckland Stars (3)	
2007	Waikato Pistons (3)	
2008	Harbour Heat (2)	
2009	Wellington Saints (8)	77.4
2010	Manawatu Jets (4)	74.2
2011	Otago Nuggets (2)	72.6
2012	Hawke's Bay Hawks (2)	72.2
2013	Nelson Giants (2)	77.3
2014	Nelson Giants (3)	77.0
2015	Nelson Giants (4)	
2016	Nelson Giants (5)	
2017	Wellington Saints (9)	
2018	Wellington Saints (10)	78.1
2019	N/A	N/A
2020	N/A	N/A
2021	N/A	N/A
2022	Nelson Giants (6)	
2023	Manawatu Jets (5)	
2024	Taranaki Airs (4)	
2025	Hawke's Bay Hawks (3)	

== See also ==
- List of National Basketball League (New Zealand) awards
