= New Zealand NBL Most Outstanding Guard Award =

The National Basketball League Most Outstanding Guard is an annual National Basketball League (NBL) award given since the league's inaugural season to the best performing guard of the regular season. The winner receives the Keith Carr Trophy, which is named in honour of Carr who made the trophy himself. Carr played for the New Zealand men's national basketball team from 1948 to 1956 and was in the team when it made its first ever overseas trip to Australia in 1955.

== Winners ==
Year	Player	Nationality	Team
1982	Brent Wright	New Zealand	Nelson Giants
1983	Kenny McFadden	United States	Wellington Saints
1984	Kenny McFadden (2)	United States	Wellington Saints
1985	Tyrone Brown	United States	Palmerston North Jets
1986	Clyde Huntley	United States	Canterbury Rams
1987	Tony Webster	United States	North Shore
1988	John Welch	United States	Waitemata Dolphins
1989	Jamie Dixon	United States	Hawke's Bay Hawks
1990	Jamie Dixon (2)	United States	Hawke's Bay Hawks
1991	Eddie Anderson	United States	Canterbury Rams
1992	Tyrone Brown (2)	United States	Palmerston North Jets
1993	Terry Giles	United States	Hawke's Bay Hawks
1994	Leonard King	United States	Otago Nuggets
1995	Dylan Rigdon	United States	Palmerston North Jets
1996	Tony Bennett	United States	North Harbour Vikings
1997	Tony Bennett (2)	United States	North Harbour Vikings
1998	Phill Jones	New Zealand	Nelson Giants
1999	Terrence Lewis	United States	Wellington Saints
2000	Tony Brown	New Zealand	Waikato Warriors
2001	Phill Jones (2)	New Zealand	Nelson Giants
2002	Terrence Lewis (Note: Lewis became a New Zealand citizen in 2001, winning both the Most Outstanding Guard Award and the Most Outstanding Kiwi Guard Award in 2002 as a result.) (2)	New Zealand	Canterbury Rams
2003	Lindsay Tait	New Zealand	Auckland Stars
2004	Lindsay Tait (2)	New Zealand	Auckland Stars
2005	Lindsay Tait (3)	New Zealand	Auckland Stars
2006	Paora Winitana	New Zealand	Hawke's Bay Hawks
2007	Josh Pace	United States	Nelson Giants
2008	Jason Crowe	United States	Waikato Pistons
2009	Mike Efevberha	United States	Wellington Saints
2010	Lindsay Tait (4)	New Zealand	Wellington Saints
2011	Lindsay Tait (5)	New Zealand	Wellington Saints
2012	Lindsay Tait (6)	New Zealand	Auckland Pirates
2013	Lindsay Tait (7)	New Zealand	Wellington Saints
2014	Corey Webster	New Zealand	Wellington Saints
2015	Torrey Craig	United States	Wellington Saints
2016	McKenzie Moore	United States	Canterbury Rams
2017	Corey Webster (2)	New Zealand	Wellington Saints
2018	Shea Ili	New Zealand	Wellington Saints
2019	Cameron Gliddon	Australia	Canterbury Rams
2020	N/A	N/A	N/A
2021	Dion Prewster	New Zealand	Wellington Saints
2022	Jarrod West	United States	Nelson Giants
2023	Jarrad Weeks	Australia	Auckland Tuatara
2024	Luther Muhammad	United States	Franklin Bulls
2025	Nick Marshall	Australia	Wellington Saints
2026	Elijah Pepper	Australia	Wellington Saints

== See also ==
- List of National Basketball League (New Zealand) awards
