= New Zealand NBL Most Outstanding Forward Award =

The National Basketball League Most Outstanding Forward is an annual National Basketball League (NBL) award given since the league's inaugural season to the best performing player of the regular season who is classified as a forward or centre. The winner of the award receives the Commissioners Cup.

== Winners ==
Year	Player	Nationality	Team
1982	Stan Hill	New Zealand	Auckland
1983	Ben Anthony	United States	Auckland
1984	Ben Anthony (2)	United States	Auckland
1985	Ronnie Joyner	United States	Ponsonby
1986	Frank Smith	United States	Nelson Giants
1987	Frank Smith (2)	United States	Nelson Giants
1988	Kerry Boagni	United States	Wellington Saints
1989	Willie Burton	United States	Palmerston North Jets
1990	Kerry Boagni (2)	United States	Wellington Saints
1991	Darryl Johnson	United States	Hutt Valley Lakers
1992	Donnell Thomas	United States	Nelson Giants
1993	Kerry Boagni (3)	United States	Hawke's Bay Hawks
1994	Darryl Johnson (2)	United States	Nelson Giants
1995	Kenny Stone	United States	Auckland Stars
1996	Ed Book	United States	Palmerston North Jets
1997	Jim DeGraffenreid	United States	Waikato Warriors
1998	Pero Cameron	New Zealand	Auckland Rebels
1999	Chris Ensminger	United States	North Harbour Kings
2000	Tony Rampton	New Zealand	Nelson Giants
2001	Clifton Bush	United States	Waikato Titans
2002	John Whorton	United States	Canterbury Rams
2003	David Cooper	Australia	Manawatu Jets
2004	Adrian Majstrovich	New Zealand	Hawke's Bay Hawks
2005	Casey Frank	United States	Auckland Stars
2005	Jacob Holmes	Australia	Nelson Giants
2006	Casey Frank (Note: Frank became a New Zealand citizen in 2006, winning both the Most Outstanding Forward Award and the Most Outstanding Kiwi Forward/Centre Award in 2006 as a result.) (2)	New Zealand	Auckland Stars
2007	Link Abrams	New Zealand	Taranaki Mountainairs
2008	Casey Frank (3)	New Zealand	Auckland Stars
2009	Thomas Abercrombie	New Zealand	Waikato Pistons
2010	Thomas Abercrombie (2)	New Zealand	Waikato Pistons
2011	Alex Pledger	New Zealand	Waikato Pistons
2012	Nick Horvath	New Zealand	Manawatu Jets
2013	Brian Conklin	United States	Southland Sharks
2014	Suleiman Braimoh	Nigeria	Taranaki Mountainairs
2015	Tai Wesley	Guam	Southland Sharks
2016	Marcel Jones	New Zealand	Canterbury Rams
2017	Tai Wesley (2)	Guam	Wellington Saints
2018	Finn Delany	New Zealand	Nelson Giants
2019	Nick Kay	Australia	Wellington Saints
2020	N/A	N/A	N/A
2021	Sam Timmins	New Zealand	Otago Nuggets
2022	Xavier Cooks	Australia	Wellington Saints
2023	Robert Loe	New Zealand	Auckland Tuatara
2024	Lachlan Olbrich	Australia	Canterbury Rams
2025	Josiah Allick	United States	Southland Sharks
2026	Sam Timmins (2)	New Zealand	Southland Sharks

== See also ==
- List of National Basketball League (New Zealand) awards
