= New Zealand NBL Coach of the Year Award =

The National Basketball League Coach of the Year is an annual National Basketball League (NBL) award given since the 1989 New Zealand NBL season to the best head coach of the regular season.

In September 2021, the Coach of the Year award was named in honour of Steve McKean following his death. McKean was coach of the Tall Blacks from 1972–1981 and received the Basketball New Zealand Coach of the Year Award in 1978 and 2002. He was the NBL's Coach of the Year in 1992.

== Winners ==
Year	Coach	Nationality	Team	Ref
1989	Curtis Wooten	New Zealand	Hawke's Bay Hawks	
1990	Matt Ruscoe	New Zealand	Nelson Giants	
1991	Jeff Green	New Zealand	Hutt Valley Lakers	
1992	Steve McKean	United States	New Plymouth Bears	
1993	James Logan	New Zealand	Hawke's Bay Hawks	
1994	Trevor Wright	New Zealand	Nelson Giants	
1995	Tab Baldwin	United States	Auckland Stars	
1996	Nenad Vučinić	New Zealand	Nelson Giants	
1997	Tab Baldwin (2)	United States	Auckland Rebels	
1998	Nenad Vučinić (2)	New Zealand	Nelson Giants	
1999	Tab Baldwin (3)	United States	Auckland Rebels	
2000	Tracy Carpenter	United States	North Harbour Kings	
2001	Nenad Vučinić (3)	New Zealand	Nelson Giants	
2002	John Watson	United States	Canterbury Rams	
2003	Mike McHugh	Australia	Wellington Saints	
2004	Shawn Dennis	Australia	Hawke's Bay Hawks	
2005	Nenad Vučinić (4)	New Zealand	Nelson Giants	
2006	Nenad Vučinić (5)	New Zealand	Nelson Giants	
2007	John Dorge	Australia	Harbour Heat	
2008	Doug Marty	United States	Wellington Saints	
2009	Dean Vickerman	Australia	Waikato Pistons	
2010	Pero Cameron	New Zealand	Wellington Saints	
2011	Dean Vickerman (2)	Australia	Waikato Pistons	
2012	Paul Henare	New Zealand	Hawke's Bay Hawks	
2013	Paul Henare (2)	New Zealand	Southland Sharks	
2014	Tab Baldwin (4)	New Zealand	Hawke's Bay Hawks	
2015	Paul Henare (3)	New Zealand	Southland Sharks	
2016	Ross McMains	New Zealand	Taranaki Mountainairs	
2017	Kevin Braswell	United States	Wellington Saints	
2018	Jamie Pearlman	Australia	Nelson Giants	
2019	Mick Downer	Australia	Canterbury Rams	
2020	Brent Matehaere	New Zealand	Otago Nuggets	
2021	Zico Coronel	New Zealand	Wellington Saints	
2022	Michael Fitchett	New Zealand	Nelson Giants	
2023	Aaron Young	New Zealand	Auckland Tuatara	
2024	Judd Flavell	New Zealand	Canterbury Rams	
2025	Aaron Young (2)	New Zealand	Wellington Saints	
2026	Quinn Clinton	New Zealand	Canterbury Rams	

== See also ==
- List of National Basketball League (New Zealand) awards
