= Peter Pokai =

New Zealand basketball player

Personal information
- Born: 24 August 1965 (age 60) Wellington, New Zealand
- Listed height: 198 cm (6 ft 6 in)
- Listed weight: 130 kg (287 lb)

Career information
- High school: Upper Hutt College (Upper Hutt, New Zealand)
- Playing career: 1988–2001
- Position: Center

Career history
- 1988: Wellington Saints
- 1990–1993: Hutt Valley Lakers
- 1994: Otago Nuggets
- 1995–1997: Wellington Saints
- 1998–1999: Nelson Giants
- 2000–2001: Wellington Saints

Career highlights
- 4× NBL champion (1988, 1991, 1993, 1998); NBL Most Outstanding Kiwi Forward/Centre (1991)

Peter Alfred Charles Pokai (born 24 August 1965) is a New Zealand former basketball player. He played 13 seasons in the National Basketball League (NBL) and represented the New Zealand Tall Blacks at the 2000 Summer Olympics.

== Early life ==
Pokai was born in Wellington, New Zealand. He attended Upper Hutt College in Upper Hutt and played basketball and rugby league as a child.

As an 18-year-old, Pokai made his debut playing for Hutt Valley in the second-division competition in 1983.

== NBL career ==
Pokai debuted in the NBL in 1988 and won a championship with the Wellington Saints. He played four seasons for the Hutt Valley Lakers between 1990 and 1993. In 1991, Pokai won the NBL Most Outstanding Kiwi Forward/Centre Award and helped Hutt Valley win the NBL championship. In 1993, he helped Hutt Valley win their second title in three years after hitting the game-winning jumper in the final.

After a season with the Otago Nuggets in 1994, Pokai played for Wellington between 1995 and 1997. In 1998, he joined the Nelson Giants. After two seasons with Nelson, he played for the Saints again in 2000 and 2001.

In April 2021, Pokai was ranked the 16th best player in the NBL's 40-year history.

== National team career ==
Pokai represented the New Zealand Tall Blacks at the 1986 FIBA World Championship and 2000 Summer Olympics.

== Personal life ==
Pokai has a brother named Matthew. As of 2021, Pokai was living in Australia.
