= List of National Basketball League (New Zealand) awards =

The National Basketball League (NBL) presents a number of annual awards to recognise its teams, players, and coaches for their accomplishments. This does not include the NBL championship trophy, which is given to the winning team of the NBL Grand Final. The award winners are typically voted on by league officials and various sportswriters throughout New Zealand, with award announcements made during the post-season.

== Team trophies ==
Award	Created	Description	Most recent winner
NBL Trophy	1982	The NBL's championship trophy; awarded to the winning team of the NBL Grand Final.	Southland Sharks
Best Team Free Throws (Nial Forsyth Trophy)	1982	Awarded to the team with the best free throw percentage during the NBL regular season.	Hawke's Bay Hawks

== Honours ==
Honour	Created	Description
All-Star Five	1982	One five-player team composed of the best players in the league during the NBL regular season.

== Individual awards ==
Award	Created	Description	Most recent winner(s)
Most Valuable Player	2003	Awarded to the best performing player of the NBL regular season.	Elijah Pepper (Wellington Saints)
Finals MVP	2004	Awarded to the best performing player of the NBL Finals.	Sam Timmins (Southland Sharks)
Most Outstanding Guard (Keith Carr Trophy)	1982	Awarded to the best performing guard of the NBL regular season.	Elijah Pepper (Wellington Saints)
Most Outstanding NZ Guard (John Macdonald Trophy)	1985	Awarded to the best performing New Zealand guard of the NBL regular season.	Taylor Britt (Canterbury Rams)
Most Outstanding Forward (Commissioners Cup)	1982	Awarded to the best performing forward of the NBL regular season.	Sam Timmins (Southland Sharks)
Most Outstanding NZ Forward/Centre (Stan Hill Trophy)	1985	Awarded to the best performing New Zealand forward-centre of the NBL regular season.	Sam Timmins (Southland Sharks)
Scoring Champion (Alan Bland Memorial Trophy)	1982	Awarded to the player with the highest points per game average of the NBL regular season.	Elijah Pepper (Wellington Saints)
Rebounding Champion (Garry Pettis Memorial Trophy)	1982	Awarded to the player with the highest rebounds per game average of the NBL regular season.	Jace Carter (Franklin Bulls); Sam Timmins (Southland Sharks)
Assist Champion (Dave Taylor Trophy)	1984	Awarded to the player with the highest assists per game average of the NBL regular season.	Carter Whitt (Franklin Bulls)
Most Improved Player	2019	Awarded to the most improved player of the NBL regular season.	Walter Brown (Canterbury Rams)
Defensive Player of the Year	2019	Awarded to the best defensive player of the NBL regular season.	Sam Timmins (Southland Sharks)
Youth Player of the Year	1986	Awarded to the top young player of the NBL regular season.	Jake Holmes (Canterbury Rams)
Sixth Man of the Year	2026	Awarded to the best performing reserve player (or sixth man) of the NBL regular season.	Tom Vodanovich (Auckland Tuatara)
Fan MVP	2026	Awarded to the best performing player of the NBL regular season, as voted on by fans.	Rylan Jones (Southland Sharks)
Coach of the Year	1989	Awarded to the best coach of the NBL regular season.	Quinn Clinton (Canterbury Rams)

== See also ==
- List of National Basketball League (Australia) awards
