= New Zealand NBL Scoring Champion =

The National Basketball League Scoring Champion is an annual National Basketball League (NBL) award given since the league's inaugural season to the player with the highest points per game average of the regular season. The winner receives the Alan Bland Memorial Trophy, which is named in honour of Bland, a Wellington native who played for the New Zealand men's national basketball team during the 1960s.

== Winners ==
Denotes players that also led the league in rebounding that season.
Denotes players that also led the league in assists that season.

Year	Player	Nationality	Team	PPG
1982	Stan Hill	New Zealand	Auckland	
1983	Kenny McFadden	United States	Wellington Saints	
1984	Kenny McFadden (2)	United States	Wellington Saints	
1985	Ronnie Joyner	United States	Ponsonby	52.6
1986	Ronnie Joyner (2)	United States	Ponsonby	44.8
1987	Ronnie Joyner (3)	United States	Ponsonby	41.4
1988	Tony Webster	United States	North Shore	
1989	Jamie Dixon	United States	Hawke's Bay Hawks	
1990	Jamie Dixon (2)	United States	Hawke's Bay Hawks	
1991	Ronnie Joyner (4)	United States	Waikato Warriors	34.8
1992	Kerry Boagni	United States	Wellington Saints	
1993	Kerry Boagni (2)	United States	Hawke's Bay Hawks	
1994	DeWayne McCray	United States	Hutt Valley Lakers	
1995	Dylan Rigdon	United States	Palmerston North Jets	
1996	Ed Book	United States	Palmerston North Jets	33.3
1997	Jim DeGraffenreid	United States	Waikato Warriors	
1998	Ronnie Joyner (5)	United States	Northland Suns	31.1
1999	Terrence Lewis	United States	Wellington Saints	34.0
2000	Troy Coleman	United States	Hawke's Bay Hawks	29.1
2001	Clifton Bush	United States	Waikato Titans	27.4
2002	Ron Grady	United States	Otago Nuggets	25.1
2003	John Whorton	United States	Canterbury Rams	29.3
2004	Geordie Cullen	Australia	Waikato Titans	23.7
2005	Greg Lewis	United States	Waikato Titans	22.1
2006	Dennis Trammell	United States	Canterbury Rams	25.6
2007	Garry Hill-Thomas	United States	Taranaki Mountainairs	26.2
2008	Brian Wethers	United States	Waikato Pistons	27.6
2009	Mike Efevberha	United States	Wellington Saints	27.8
2010	Eric Devendorf	United States	Wellington Saints	25.6
2011	Jack Leasure	United States	Taranaki Mountainairs	22.9
2012	Josh Pace	United States	Manawatu Jets	23.0
2013	Josh Pace (2)	United States	Nelson Giants	22.9
2014	Jason Cadee	Australia	Super City Rangers	26.7
2015	Aaron Fuller	United States	Taranaki Mountainairs	28.4
2016	Eric Devendorf (2)	United States	Super City Rangers	25.8
2017	Corey Webster	New Zealand	Wellington Saints	26.0
2018	Daishon Knight	United States	Manawatu Jets	28.9
2019	Tim Quarterman	United States	Super City Rangers	28.0
2020	Derone Raukawa	New Zealand	Taranaki Mountainairs	22.8
2021	Hunter Hale	United States	Nelson Giants	26.9
2022	Anthony Hilliard	United States	Taranaki Airs	26.6
2023	Jeremy Kendle	United States	Southland Sharks	24.6
2024	Luther Muhammad	United States	Franklin Bulls	25.7
2025	Jeremy Combs	United States	Nelson Giants	24.4
2026	Elijah Pepper	Australia	Wellington Saints	28.7

== See also ==
- List of National Basketball League (New Zealand) awards
