= List of New Zealand NBL champions =

Below is a list of the New Zealand National Basketball League (NBL) champions. The NBL's championship round has predominantly been a one-game decider, with the exception being 1995–97 and 2007–10 when a best-of-three finals series was used. The Wellington Saints have won a league-best 13 championships to go with 22 appearances in the championship round.

== Champions ==
Year	Champions	Result(s)	Runners-up	Source(s)
1982	Auckland	N/A	Waitemata Dolphins	
1983	Auckland	80 – 77	Wellington Saints	
1984	Wellington Saints	96 – 83	Auckland	
1985	Wellington Saints	114 – 111	Auckland	
1986	Canterbury Rams	87 – 82	Wellington Saints	
1987	Wellington Saints	100 – 87	Canterbury Rams	
1988	Wellington Saints	81 – 78	North Shore	
1989	Canterbury Rams	91 – 83	Auckland	
1990	Canterbury Rams	76 – 73	Nelson Giants	
1991	Hutt Valley Lakers	103 – 92	Wellington Saints	
1992	Canterbury Rams	79 – 71	Palmerston North Jets	
1993	Hutt Valley Lakers	68 – 66	Canterbury Rams	
1994	Nelson Giants	67 – 66	Canterbury Rams	
1995	Auckland Stars	2 – 0 (80–74, 70–57)	Hawke's Bay Hawks	
1996	Auckland Stars	2 – 1 (95–110, 109–98, 94–90)	Nelson Giants	
1997	Auckland Rebels	2 – 0 (115–94, 100–82)	Nelson Giants	
1998	Nelson Giants	81 – 73	North Harbour Kings	
1999	Auckland Rebels	79 – 72	Canterbury Rams	
2000	Auckland Rebels	95 – 78	Nelson Giants	
2001	Waikato Titans	112 – 97	Wellington Saints	
2002	Waikato Titans	85 – 83	Nelson Giants	
2003	Wellington Saints	97 – 88	Waikato Titans	
2004	Auckland Stars	80 – 68	Nelson Giants	
2005	Auckland Stars	69 – 68	Hawke's Bay Hawks	
2006	Hawke's Bay Hawks	84 – 69	Auckland Stars	
2007	Nelson Giants	2 – 0 (76–67, 96–83)	Hawke's Bay Hawks	
2008	Waikato Pistons	2 – 0 (95–78, 84–79)	Wellington Saints	
2009	Waikato Pistons	2 – 0 (81–69, 94–84)	Nelson Giants	
2010	Wellington Saints	2 – 1 (74–84, 98–69, 82–79)	Waikato Pistons	
2011	Wellington Saints	106 – 97	Hawke's Bay Hawks	
2012	Auckland Pirates	89 – 83	Wellington Saints	
2013	Southland Sharks	92 – 81	Nelson Giants	
2014	Wellington Saints	85 – 69	Hawke's Bay Hawks	
2015	Southland Sharks	72 – 68	Wellington Saints	
2016	Wellington Saints	94 – 82	Super City Rangers	
2017	Wellington Saints	108 – 75	Southland Sharks	
2018	Southland Sharks	98 – 96	Wellington Saints	
2019	Wellington Saints	78 – 68	Hawke's Bay Hawks	
2020	Otago Nuggets	79 – 77	Manawatu Jets	
2021	Wellington Saints	77 – 75	Hawke's Bay Hawks	
2022	Otago Nuggets	81 – 73	Auckland Tuatara	
2023	Canterbury Rams	93 – 82	Auckland Tuatara	
2024	Canterbury Rams	102 – 87	Auckland Tuatara	
2025	Wellington Saints	88 – 83	Southland Sharks	
2026	Southland Sharks	104 – 101	Wellington Saints	

== Results by team ==
Team	Title(s)	Runner(s)-up	Total	Year(s) won	Year(s) lost
Wellington Saints	13	9	22	1984, 1985, 1987, 1988, 2003, 2010, 2011, 2014, 2016, 2017, 2019, 2021, 2025	1983, 1986, 1991, 2001, 2008, 2012, 2015, 2018, 2026
Auckland Stars	9	4	13	1982, 1983, 1995, 1996, 1997, 1999, 2000, 2004, 2005	1984, 1985, 1989, 2006
Canterbury Rams	6	4	10	1986, 1989, 1990, 1992, 2023, 2024	1987, 1993, 1994, 1999
Waikato Pistons	4	2	6	2001, 2002, 2008, 2009	2003, 2010
Southland Sharks	4	2	6	2013, 2015, 2018, 2026	2017, 2025
Nelson Giants	3	8	11	1994, 1998, 2007	1990, 1996, 1997, 2000, 2002, 2004, 2009, 2013
Hutt Valley Lakers	2	0	2	1991, 1993	
Otago Nuggets	2	0	2	2020, 2022	
Hawke's Bay Hawks	1	7	8	2006	1995, 2005, 2007, 2011, 2014, 2019, 2021
Auckland Pirates	1	0	1	2012	
Auckland Tuatara	0	3	3		2022, 2023, 2024
Harbour Heat	0	2	2		1988, 1998
Manawatu Jets	0	2	2		1992, 2020
Waitemata Dolphins	0	1	1		1982
Super City Rangers	0	1	1		2016

== See also ==
- Conference Basketball League
- New Zealand NBL Finals Most Valuable Player Award
