= Clifton Bush =

American-New Zealand basketball player

Personal information
- Born: 1 September 1970 (age 56) Little Rock, Arkansas, U.S.
- Listed height: 195 cm (6 ft 5 in)
- Listed weight: 92 kg (203 lb)

Career information
- College: Central Arkansas (1988–1992)
- NBA draft: 1992: undrafted
- Playing career: 1997–2009
- Position: Small forward

Career history

Playing
- 1997: Breiðablik
- 1997–1999: Canterbury Rams
- 1997–1998: Snæfell
- 1999–2000: KFÍ
- 2000–2001: Waikato Warriors/Titans
- 2000–2001: Þór Akureyri
- 2001: Estudiantes de Olavarría
- 2002: Manawatu Jets
- 2002–2003: Snæfell
- 2003: Canterbury Knights
- 2004–2005: Canterbury Rams
- 2005–2006: New Zealand Breakers
- 2006: Manawatu Jets
- 2007–2009: Hawke's Bay Hawks

Coaching
- 2017: Hawke's Bay Hawks (assistant)

Career highlights
- NZNBL champion (2001); NZNBL Most Outstanding Forward (2001); NZNBL All-Star Five (2001); NZNBL scoring champion (2001); CBL champion (2003); CBL All-Star Five (2003); 1. deild champion (1998); 1. deild Foreign Player of the Year (1998); 1. deild scoring champion (1998); 2× First-team All-NAIA (1991, 1992)

Clifton Bush II (born 1 September 1970) is an American-New Zealand former professional basketball player. He played the majority of his career in the New Zealand National Basketball League (NZNBL) and gained New Zealand citizenship in 2004. In 2001, he was the league's leading scorer, voted Outstanding Forward and was a member of the All-Star Five while helping the Waikato Titans to the title. He also spent five seasons playing in Iceland, where he was named 1. deild Foreign Player of the Year in 1998.

== Early life ==
Bush was born in Little Rock, Arkansas.

== College career ==
Bush played four years of college basketball for the Central Arkansas Bears. As a sophomore in 1989–90, he started all 35 games for the Bears and averaged 16.8 points per game (587 total points) on .498 field goal shooting (220-of-442).

As a junior in 1990–91, Bush started in 33 of the Bears' 34 games, and scored a school single-season high of 682 points, good for 20.1 points per game (ranked eighth in single-season scoring averages) on .560 field goal shooting (263-of-470) and .563 three-point shooting (58-of-103). He also recorded 280 rebounds (8.2 pg) and 62 steals (1.8 pg).

As a senior in 1991–92, Bush started in all 33 games for the Bears and averaged 19.0 points per game (626 total points) on .499 field goal shooting (248-of-497). He also recorded 59 steals (1.8 pg). He was first-team All-NAIA in 1991 and 1992.

In 2004, Bush was inducted into the University of Central Arkansas Sports Hall of Honor.

== Professional career ==
In January 1997, Bush joined Breiðablik in Iceland for the second half of the 1996–97 Úrvalsdeild season. In 11 games, he averaged 24.7 points and 12.3 rebounds per game.

Bush joined the Canterbury Rams for the 1997 New Zealand NBL season. In 20 games for the Rams, he averaged 24.4 points, 9.0 rebounds, 2.3 assists and 2.6 steals per game.

Bush joined Snæfell for the 1997–98 season where he was named the 1. deild Foreign Player of the Year after averaging a career-high 30.4 points and leading the team to the 1. deild championship and promotion to the top-tier Úrvalsdeild karla.

Bush returned to New Zealand and played in 40 games for the Rams in 1998 and 1999, helping the club reach the playoffs both years, including the final in 1999.

For the 1999–2000 season, Bush returned to Iceland to play for KFÍ, where he averaged 26.3 points in 17 games. On October 19, 1999, Bush played 59 minutes and scored 55 points in a quadruple overtime victory against Skallagrímur. On February 13, 2000, he suffered a knee injury in a game against Njarðvík and wound up missing the rest of the season.

For the 2000 New Zealand NBL season, Bush played for the Waikato Warriors and helped them finish second with a 12–4 record. In their semi-final against the Nelson Giants, the team lost 105–100 with Bush scoring two points in 24 minutes off the bench. In 14 games, he averaged 13.4 points per game.

Bush again played in Iceland for the 2000–01 season, averaging 21.8 points and 14.1 rebounds in 11 games for Þór Akureyri.

With the Waikato Titans in the 2001 New Zealand NBL season, Bush averaged 27.4 points per game and earned the league's scoring title. He also earned Most Outstanding Forward honors, and was named to the league's All-Star Five. He led Waikato to their maiden championship with 26 points in a 112–97 win over the Wellington Saints in the final.

In October 2001, Bush had a five-game stint with Argentinean club Estudiantes de Olavarría.

For the 2002 New Zealand NBL season, Bush joined the Manawatu Jets. He appeared in all 16 regular season games for the Jets, averaging 23.3 points and 10.5 rebounds per game and helping the team reach the playoffs with a fourth-place finish and a 9–7 record. In their semi-final clash with the Nelson Giants, the Jets lost 83–64 despite Bush's 18-point game. That year, Bush tried out for a spot on the Tall Blacks as a naturalised player.

His final Icelandic season came in 2002–03 with Snæfell. He played in 22 games during the season, averaging 23.7 points, 12.1 rebounds, 2.3 steals and 1.5 steals in 39.1 minutes per game.

In 2003, Bush joined the Canterbury Knights of the Conference Basketball League, New Zealand's second-tier competition. He helped the Knights reach the CBL final, where he recorded 13 points and 12 rebounds in an 80–69 win over Hutt Valley to win the championship. He subsequently earned CBL All-Star Five honors.

Bush returned to the Canterbury Rams for the 2004 New Zealand NBL season and continued on in the 2005 season.

Bush joined the New Zealand Breakers for the 2005–06 NBL season. In November 2005, he was ruled out for the rest of the season with a back injury. He played in seven games for the Breakers.

For the 2006 New Zealand NBL season, Bush re-joined the Manawatu Jets. In 17 games for the Jets, he averaged 13.9 points, 5.9 rebounds and 1.3 assists per game.

Between 2007 and 2009, Bush played for the Hawke's Bay Hawks. The Hawks finished runners-up in 2007. He averaged 2.9 points and 2.1 rebounds in 2008 and scored seven points in the team's quarter-final loss to the Nelson Giants. He played in six games for the Hawks in 2009.

== Coaching career ==
In 2017, Bush served as an assistant coach for the Hawke's Bay Hawks.

== Personal life ==
Bush's father, the late Clifton Bush the First, also played basketball as a youth. Bush has two children, Maria and Clifton III.

Bush obtained New Zealand citizenship in 2004.

After retiring from playing, Bush worked as a coach in Hawkes Bay's.
