= Arthur Trousdell =

New Zealand-British professional basketball player

Personal information
- Born: 21 April 1981 (age 45) Hawke's Bay, New Zealand
- Listed height: 203 cm (6 ft 8 in)
- Listed weight: 100 kg (220 lb)

Career information
- High school: Hasting Boys' (Hastings, New Zealand)
- College: Southwest Baptist (2002–2004); Cameron (2004–2006)
- NBA draft: 2006: undrafted
- Playing career: 1998–2021
- Position: Power forward / center

Career history
- 1998: Hawke's Bay Hawks
- 2000: Canterbury Rams
- 2001–2002: Hawke's Bay Hawks
- 2006–2007: Hawke's Bay Hawks
- 2006: BC Boncourt
- 2006: CB Villa de Los Barrios
- 2008–2009: Wellington Saints
- 2010: Southland Sharks
- 2011: Hawke's Bay Hawks
- 2012–2013: Wellington Saints
- 2014: Manawatu Jets
- 2016: Hawke's Bay Hawks
- 2017: Wellington Saints
- 2018–2019: Sunbury Jets
- 2021: Hawke's Bay Hawks

Career highlights
- Big V D1 champion (2019); NZNBL champion (2006); NZNBL Rookie of the Year (2000); Second-team All-LSC North Division (2006)

Arthur Roy Trousdell (born 21 April 1981) is a New Zealand-British former professional basketball player.

== Early life and career ==
Trousdell was born in Hawke's Bay, New Zealand. He attended Hastings Boys' High School.

Trousdell moved to the United States in 2002 to play college basketball for Southwest Baptist University. He transferred to Cameron University in 2004, where he completed his junior and senior years. He was named to All-LSC North Division Second Team as a senior in 2006.

== Professional career ==
Prior to attending college in the United States, Trousdell made his New Zealand NBL debut in 1998 with the Hawke's Bay Hawks. He won Rookie of the Year in 2000 playing for the Canterbury Rams. He then played for the Hawks in 2001 and 2002.

After playing for the Hawks in 2006 and winning a championship, Trousdell had a one-game stint in Switzerland with BC Boncourt. He then had a four-game stint in Spain with CB Villa de Los Barrios. He continued on with the Hawks in 2007, before playing for the Wellington Saints in 2008 and 2009. As a member of the Saints' second division team in 2008, he helped them win the CBL championship. He earned CBL Finals MVP and was named to the Tournament Team.

Trousdell played for the inaugural Southland Sharks squad in 2010, then returned to Hawke's Bay in 2011. He then played for Wellington again in 2012 and 2013. In 2014, he played for the Manawatu Jets.

Trousdell had a fifth stint with the Hawke's Bay Hawks in 2016. In 2017, he had a two-game stint with the Wellington Saints.

In 2018 and 2019, Trousdell played in the Australian Big V Division One for the Sunbury Jets, winning a championship in 2019.

In 2021, Trousdell re-joined the Hawke's Bay Hawks.

== National team career ==
Trousdell was a 2005 Tall Blacks squad member.

== Personal ==
Trousdell has a British father and holds a British passport as a result.

Trousdell's partner, Josie Stockill, is also a basketball player.
