= Tohi Smith-Milner =

New Zealand basketball player

No. 18 – Ibaraki Robots
- Position: Power forward
- League: B.League

Personal information
- Born: 6 October 1995 (age 31) Auckland, New Zealand
- Listed height: 2.05 m (6 ft 9 in)
- Listed weight: 117 kg (258 lb)

Career information
- High school: Rosmini College (Auckland, New Zealand)
- College: Polk State (2014–2015)
- Playing career: 2012–present

Career history
- 2012: Auckland Pirates
- 2013–2015: Super City Rangers
- 2015–2020: Melbourne United
- 2016: Sandringham Sabres
- 2017: Canterbury Rams
- 2017: Frankston Blues
- 2018: Nelson Giants
- 2019: Kilsyth Cobras
- 2020: Auckland Huskies
- 2021: Wellington Saints
- 2021–2023: South East Melbourne Phoenix
- 2022: Sandringham Sabres
- 2023–2024: Wellington Saints
- 2023–2024: Adelaide 36ers
- 2024–2025: Brisbane Bullets
- 2025: Canterbury Rams
- 2025–2026: Brisbane Bullets
- 2026: Nelson Giants
- 2026–present: Ibaraki Robots

Career highlights
- NBL champion (2018); 2× NZNBL champion (2012, 2021); First-team All-Suncoast Conference (2015)
Medals
Men's basketball
Representing New Zealand
FIBA Asia Cup
| Bronze medal – third place | 2022 Jakarta |
Commonwealth Games
| Bronze medal – third place | 2018 Gold Coast | Team |

Tohiraukura Makaere Smith-Milner (born 6 October 1995) is a New Zealand professional basketball player for the Ibaraki Robots of the Japanese B.League. He has previously played in the Australian National Basketball League (NBL) for Melbourne United, South East Melbourne Phoenix, Adelaide 36ers and Brisbane Bullets, and in the NZNBL for the Wellington Saints, Auckland Huskies, and Nelson Giants. Smith-Milner has also represented the New Zealand national team.

== Early life ==
Smith-Milner was born and raised in Auckland, where he attended Rosmini College and played junior basketball for Waitakere.

== Professional career ==
=== NZNBL and Australian state leagues ===
Smith-Milner debuted in the New Zealand NBL in 2012 with the championship-winning Auckland Pirates, playing five games. He joined the Super City Rangers in 2013 but did not play, going on to play 10 games for the Rangers in 2014 and averaging 12.7 points per game.

After a season in the United States playing college basketball for Polk State College in 2014–15, Smith-Milner re-joined the Rangers for the 2015 season.

In 2016, Smith-Milner played for the Sandringham Sabres in the SEABL. In 2017, he played for both the Canterbury Rams in the New Zealand NBL and the Frankston Blues in the SEABL. He played for the Nelson Giants in the New Zealand NBL in 2018 and the Kilsyth Cobras in the NBL1 in 2019. He played for the Auckland Huskies in 2020, the Wellington Saints in 2021, and the Sandringham Sabres in 2022.

Smith-Milner joined the Wellington Saints in 2023. He re-joined the Saints in 2024.

Smith-Milner joined the Canterbury Rams for the 2025 season, returning for the franchise for the first time since 2017.

Smith-Milner joined the Nelson Giants for the 2026 season, returning for the franchise for the first time since 2018.

=== Australian NBL ===
In 2015, Smith-Milner joined Melbourne United of the Australian NBL. He spent three seasons as a development player before signing a full-time contract in 2018. He spent two seasons with United as a fully contracted player.

On 13 August 2021, Smith-Milner signed a two-year deal with the South East Melbourne Phoenix, with the second year being a Club Option.

On 26 August 2023, Smith-Milner signed with the Adelaide 36ers for the 2023–24 NBL season.

On 19 April 2024, Smith-Milner signed a two-year deal with the Brisbane Bullets. In November 2024, he played his 150th NBL game. On 21 February 2025, the Bullets exercised the club option in his contract for the 2025–26 season.

== National team career ==
Smith-Milner played for the New Zealand Tall Blacks in the 2017 FIBA Asia Cup in Lebanon, where he averaged 10.5 points and 4.2 rebounds. The following year, he was a member of the bronze-medal winning Tall Blacks squad at the 2018 Commonwealth Games. In 2019, he played in the FIBA Basketball World Cup in China, where he averaged 5.2 points and 2.8 rebounds.

In July 2022, Smith-Milner helped New Zealand win bronze at the FIBA Asia Cup. He was subsequently named to the All-Star Five.

In July 2023, Smith-Milner was named in the Tall Blacks squad for the 2023 FIBA World Cup.

In May 2025, Smith-Milner was named in the Tall Blacks squad for a trans-Tasman series against Australia. Two months later, he was named in the Tall Blacks squad for the 2025 FIBA Asia Cup.

In November 2025, Smith-Milner was named in the Tall Blacks squad for the first window of the FIBA Basketball World Cup 2027 Asian Qualifiers. In February 2026, he was named in the squad for two more Asian qualifiers. In June 2026, he was named in the squad for another two Asian qualifiers.

== Personal life ==
Smith-Milner and his partner Hana had their first child in November 2024.
