= Kevin Braswell =

American basketball player and coach (1979–2025)

Personal information
- Born: January 23, 1979 Baltimore, Maryland, U.S.
- Died: February 24, 2025 (aged 46) Utsunomiya, Tochigi Prefecture, Japan
- Listed height: 188 cm (6 ft 2 in)
- Listed weight: 86 kg (190 lb)

Career information
- High school: Lake Clifton (Baltimore, Maryland); Maine Central Institute (Pittsfield, Maine)
- College: Georgetown (1998–2002)
- NBA draft: 2002: undrafted
- Playing career: 2002–2016
- Position: Point guard
- Coaching career: 2016–2025

Career history

Playing
- 2002: Tournai Estaimpuis
- 2003: Spójnia Stargard Szczeciński
- 2003–2004: Cimberio Aironi Novara
- 2004–2005: Florida Flame
- 2005: Columbus Riverdragons
- 2005: Pınar Karşıyaka
- 2005: Kolossos Rodou
- 2006: Metros de Santiago
- 2006–2007: Standart Samara reg. Toliatti
- 2007–2008: Selçuk Üniversitesi
- 2008: HKK Široki
- 2008–2009: Cholet Basket
- 2009: Barak Netanya
- 2010–2011: New Zealand Breakers
- 2010: Limoges CSP
- 2011–2015: Southland Sharks
- 2012: Melbourne Tigers
- 2016: Wellington Saints

Coaching
- 2016–2018: Wellington Saints
- 2018–2019: New Zealand Breakers
- 2020: Auckland Huskies
- 2021–2023: Akita Northern Happinets (assistant)
- 2023–2024: Utsunomiya Brex (assistant)
- 2024–2025: Utsunomiya Brex

Career highlights
- As player: 2× NZNBL champion (2013, 2015); NBL champion (2011); LNB champion (2006); NBL Best Sixth Man (2011); Third-team All-Big East (2002); Second-team All-Big East (2001); Big East All-Rookie Team (1999); No. 12 retired by Southland Sharks; As coach: 2× NZNBL champion (2016, 2017); NZNBL Coach of the Year (2017)

Kevin Levelle Braswell (January 23, 1979 – February 24, 2025) was an American professional basketball player and coach. He played four years of college basketball for the Georgetown Hoyas between 1998 and 2002 before playing professionally for 14 years. He most notably played in New Zealand, where he won a championship in the Australian National Basketball League with the New Zealand Breakers in 2011. That year, he won the NBL Best Sixth Man Award. He later played for the Southland Sharks in the New Zealand National Basketball League, where he won NZNBL championships in 2013 and 2015. He began his coaching career in 2016 and coached in New Zealand and Japan. He served as head coach of the Utsunomiya Brex in the Japanese B.League during the 2024–25 season.

== Early life ==
Braswell was born and raised in Baltimore, Maryland, where he attended Lake Clifton Eastern High School. He then had a prep season at Maine Central Institute in Pittsfield, Maine.

== College career ==
Braswell played four years of college basketball for the Georgetown Hoyas between 1998 and 2002. He finished his career at Georgetown ranking seventh all time in scoring (1,735). His 1,569 field goal attempts were more than all but two players in school history (Eric Floyd and Reggie Williams). He set the all time record for 3-pointers (189), which was broken in December 2007 by Jonathan Wallace. Braswell was also first at Georgetown in career assists (695) and steals (349). He was named Third Team All-Big East as a senior and Second Team as a junior, and was named to the Big East All-Rookie Team as a freshman. He started in all 128 of his games for the Hoyas, averaging 13.6 points, 3.9 rebounds, 5.4 assists and 2.7 steals per game.

== Professional career ==
Braswell began his professional career splitting the 2002–03 season in Belgium with Tournai Estaimpuis and in Poland with Spójnia Stargard Szczeciński. For the 2003–04 season, he moved to Italy to play for Cimberio Aironi Novara. In 2004–05, Braswell split the NBDL season with the Florida Flame and Columbus Riverdragons. He finished the season in Turkey with Pınar Karşıyaka.

In July 2005, Braswell played for the Toronto Raptors in the NBA Summer League. He later signed with the Miami Heat on October 3, 2005, but was waived on October 12 after appearing in one preseason game. He subsequently returned to Europe and played seven games for Greek team Kolossos Rodou before leaving in December 2005.

In September 2006, Braswell helped Metros de Santiago win the LNB championship.

For the 2006–07 season, Braswell moved to Russia to play for Standart Samara reg. Toliatti. For the 2007–08 season, he returned to Turkey to play for Selçuk Üniversitesi.

Braswell began the 2008–09 season in Bosnia with HKK Široki before playing out the season in France after joining Cholet Basket in December 2008.

In the 2009–10 season, Braswell began with playing eight games in Israel with Barak Netanya between October 25 and December 14. On January 12, 2010, he signed with the New Zealand Breakers for the last seven games of the 2009–10 NBL season. Following the conclusion of the Breakers' season, Braswell returned to Europe and joined French team Limoges CSP.

After initially signing with Turkish team Aliağa Belediyesi SK for the 2010–11 season, Braswell instead returned to New Zealand and joined the Breakers for the NBL season. In April 2011, he helped the Breakers win the NBL championship. He was subsequently named the NBL Best Sixth Man.

In May 2011, Braswell joined the Southland Sharks for the 2011 New Zealand NBL season. However, just six games into the season, he suffered a season-ending Achilles injury which required surgery. He had never previously experienced a serious injury in his basketball career.

With Braswell still on the comeback trail from injury, the Breakers decided to move in a different direction for the 2011–12 season. He received interest from several other Australian NBL clubs, but a contract failed to materialise, which saw him sign with the Sharks for the 2012 season.

On August 16, 2012, Braswell signed with the Melbourne Tigers for the 2012–13 NBL season. However, on November 5, 2012, he was released by the Tigers after playing hurt over the first five games.

Braswell returned to the Southland Sharks for the 2013 New Zealand NBL season and helped lead them to the championship. He returned to the Sharks in 2014 and had a 45-point effort in his 50th game.

Returning to Southland for a fifth season in 2015, Braswell helped the Sharks win their second title in three years. He retired from professional basketball following the 2015 season, with the Sharks retiring his No. 12 jersey. In 78 career games for the Sharks, he averaged 19.5 points, 3.8 rebounds, 4.8 assists and 2.2 steals per game.

== Coaching career ==
On August 3, 2015, Braswell was appointed head coach of the Wellington Saints for the 2016 New Zealand NBL season. On April 15, 2016, he came out of retirement for a one-game stint, helping his depleted Saints in a 97–72 loss to the Canterbury Rams. He went on to guide the Saints to the championship in his first season as coach.

In 2017, Braswell guided the Saints to back-to-back titles behind an undefeated 20–0 campaign and New Zealand NBL Coach of the Year honours. He returned to Wellington for a third and final season in 2018, leading the Saints to a third straight grand final where they lost to the Southland Sharks.

On April 16, 2018, Braswell was appointed head coach of the New Zealand Breakers on a three-year deal. However, he was released from his contract in June 2019 after completing just one season.

In May 2020, Braswell was appointed head coach of the Auckland Huskies of the New Zealand NBL. He parted ways with the Huskies following the 2020 season.

On June 25, 2021, Braswell was appointed assistant coach of the Akita Northern Happinets in the Japanese B.League. In the 2022–23 season, he served as associate coach and acting head coach of the Happinets.

On July 4, 2023, Braswell was appointed associate coach of the Utsunomiya Brex for the 2023–24 season. He was elevated to head coach of the Utsunomiya Brex for the 2024–25 season.

== Personal life and death ==
Braswell's immediate family included his mother, Millicent Boone, and his younger brother, James Boone.

Braswell underwent emergency heart surgery in Japan on January 17, 2025. He remained in a hospital in Utsunomiya, but died on February 24, at the age of 46.

== See also ==
- List of NCAA Division I men's basketball career steals leaders
