= 2011 FIBA Oceania Championship squads =

These are the team rosters of the two teams competing for the 2011 FIBA Oceania Championship.

== Australia ==
Australia National Basketball Team roster
Players
Coaches

Pos.	No.	Name	Age – Date of birth	Height	Club	Ctr.
PG	4	Damian Martin	26 – 5 September 1984	1.88 m (6 ft 2 in)	Perth Wildcats	(Australia)
PG	5	Patrick Mills	22 – 11 August 1988	1.83 m (6 ft 0 in)	Melbourne Tigers	(Australia)
PG	6	Adam Gibson	24 – 30 October 1986	1.88 m (6 ft 2 in)	Gold Coast Blaze	(Australia)
SF	7	Joe Ingles	23 – 2 October 1987	2.03 m (6 ft 8 in)	FC Barcelona Bàsquet	(Spain)
SG	8	Brad Newley	26 – 18 February 1985	2.01 m (6 ft 7 in)	BC Lietuvos Rytas	(Lithuania)
SG	9	Matthew Dellavedova	20 – 8 September 1990	1.93 m (6 ft 4 in)	Saint Mary's College of California	(United States)
SF	10	David Barlow	27 – 22 October 1983	2.05 m (6 ft 9 in)	CB Murcia	(Spain)
PF	11	Mark Worthington	28 – 8 June 1983	2.02 m (6 ft 8 in)	Gold Coast Blaze	(Australia)
F/C	12	Aron Baynes	24 – 9 December 1986	2.08 m (6 ft 10 in)	Ikaros Kallitheas B.C.	(Greece)
C	13	Andrew Ogilvy	23 – 17 June 1988	2.11 m (6 ft 11 in)	Valencia BC	(Spain)
PF	14	Matthew Nielsen (C)	33 – 3 February 1978	2.08 m (6 ft 10 in)	BC Khimki	(Russia)
C	15	Aleks Marić	26 – 22 October 1984	2.11 m (6 ft 11 in)	Panathinaikos BC	(Greece)

Head coach

- (United States) Brett Brown

Assistant coach(es)

- (Australia) Andrej Lemanis
- (Australia) Marty Clarke

Technical assistant

- (Australia) Mo Dakhil

Strength & conditioning coach

- (Australia) Bohdan Babijczuk

Legend

- (C) Team captain
- Club field describes current pro club

== New Zealand ==
New Zealand National Basketball Team roster
Players
Coaches

Pos.	No.	Name	Age – Date of birth	Height	Club	Ctr.
PG	4	Lindsay Tait	29 – 8 January 1982	1.90 m (6 ft 3 in)	Wellington Saints	(New Zealand)
PG	5	Michael Fitchett	28 – 20 September 1982	1.86 m (6 ft 1 in)	Nelson Giants	(New Zealand)
SG	6	Kirk Penney (C)	30 – 23 November 1980	1.96 m (6 ft 5 in)	Baloncesto Fuenlabrada	(Spain)
PF	7	Mika Vukona	29 – 13 May 1982	1.98 m (6 ft 6 in)	New Zealand Breakers	(New Zealand)
G	8	Mark Dickel	34 – 21 December 1976	1.88 m (6 ft 2 in)	Otago Nuggets	(New Zealand)
PG	9	Jarrod Kenny	25 – 17 September 1985	1.88 m (6 ft 2 in)	New Zealand Breakers	(New Zealand)
SF	10	Thomas Abercrombie	24 – 5 July 1987	1.98 m (6 ft 6 in)	New Zealand Breakers	(New Zealand)
C	11	Alex Pledger	24 – 27 March 1987	2.13 m (7 ft 0 in)	New Zealand Breakers	(New Zealand)
PF	12	B. J. Anthony	23 – 20 July 1988	1.98 m (6 ft 6 in)	New Zealand Breakers	(New Zealand)
F/C	13	Casey Frank	33 – 23 October 1977	2.03 m (6 ft 8 in)	Wellington Saints	(New Zealand)
SF	14	Leon Henry	25 – 14 October 1985	2.02 m (6 ft 8 in)	New Zealand Breakers	(New Zealand)
C	15	Robert Loe	20 – 5 August 1991	2.11 m (6 ft 11 in)	Saint Louis University	(United States)

Head coach

- (Serbia) Nenad Vučinić

Assistant coach(es)

- (New Zealand) Chris Tupu
- (New Zealand) Pero Cameron

Physiotherapist

- (New Zealand) Anousith Bouaaphone

General manager

- (New Zealand) Claire Dallison

Legend

- (C) Team captain
- Club field describes current pro club
