= Tony Rampton (basketball) =

New Zealand basketball player

Personal information
- Born: 30 May 1976 (age 50) New Plymouth, New Zealand
- Listed height: 213 cm (7 ft 0 in)
- Listed weight: 112 kg (247 lb)

Career information
- High school: New Plymouth Boys' (New Plymouth, New Zealand); Waseca (Waseca, Minnesota)
- College: Iowa State (1995–1999)
- NBA draft: 1999: undrafted
- Playing career: 1999–2010
- Position: Centre
- Coaching career: 2011–2015

Career history

Playing
- 1999: Taranaki Oilers
- 2000: Nelson Giants
- 2000–2001: Kouvot
- 2000: →Korikouvot
- 2001–2005: Cairns Taipans
- 2005–2006: Taranaki Mountainairs
- 2005–2007: Wollongong Hawks
- 2007–2009: West Sydney Razorbacks / Sydney Spirit
- 2008: Taranaki Mountainairs
- 2009–2010: Nelson Giants
- 2009–2010: Cairns Taipans

Coaching
- 2011–2013: Nelson Giants (asst.)
- 2014–2015: Nelson Sparks

Career highlights
- NZNBL Kiwi MVP (2000); NZNBL All-Star Five (2000); NZNBL Most Outstanding Forward (2000); NZNBL Most Outstanding Kiwi Forward/Centre (2000); NZNBL rebounding champion (2000); NZNBL Rookie of the Rear (1999)
Medals
Men's basketball
Representing New Zealand
Commonwealth Games
| Silver medal – second place | 2006 Melbourne | Team competition |

Tony Rampton (born 30 May 1976) is a New Zealand former professional basketball player.

== Early life and college ==
Rampton was born in New Plymouth, New Zealand, and attended New Plymouth Boys' High School.

Rampton left New Zealand as a rising 17-year-old talent to play two years of high school basketball in the United States. He attended Waseca High School in Waseca, Minnesota, before spending four years at Iowa State between 1995 and 1999, where he averaged 2.2 points and 2.1 rebounds in 80 games.

== Professional career ==
Rampton played his first year in the New Zealand NBL with the Taranaki Oilers in 1999 and won rookie of the year. He joined the Nelson Giants in 2000 and went on to help them reach the grand final, where they lost to the Auckland Rebels. He was named Kiwi MVP, the league's most outstanding forward, was crowned rebounding champion with 14.6 a game and was included in the league's All-Star Five.

Rampton started the 2000–01 season in Finland before finishing with the Cairns Taipans of the Australian NBL. After injury saw him only play half a season with the Taipans in 2001–02, he continued on with Cairns between 2002 and 2005. Between 2005 and 2007, he played for the Wollongong Hawks. He then played two seasons for the West Sydney Razorbacks / Sydney Spirit. His final season in the Australian NBL came in the 2009–10 season with the Taipans.

In the New Zealand NBL, Rampton returned to Taranaki in 2005. He played for Taranaki again in 2006 but did not return in 2007. He played for Taranaki again in 2008. In 2009 and 2010, he played for the Nelson Giants. He retired due to a chronic ankle injury that had plagued him since 2000.

In March 2021, Rampton was named among the greatest 40 New Zealand NBL players of all time, ranking at No. 36 in the NBL's '40in40' selection for the best players in the 40-year history of the league.

== National team career ==
Rampton first represented New Zealand in 1997 at the World Championship for Men '22 and Under'. He debuted for the Tall Blacks in 1999. In 2000, he played for the Tall Blacks at the Sydney Olympics. He went on to play for the Tall Blacks at the 2003 FIBA Oceania Championship, 2004 Summer Olympics, 2005 FIBA Oceania Championship, 2006 Commonwealth Games, 2006 FIBA World Championship, and 2007 FIBA Oceania Championship.

== Coaching career ==
Between 2011 and 2013, Rampton served as an assistant coach with the Nelson Giants. In 2014 and 2015, he coached the Nelson Sparks in the national women's basketball championship.

== Personal life ==
Rampton is the son Taranaki basketball legend Brian Rampton. Tony's brother, Damon, also played in the New Zealand NBL and the pair played alongside each other with Taranaki.

Rampton's wife Nicki (née Thompson) also played basketball in New Zealand. She was coached by Tony at the Nelson Sparks.

As of March 2021, Rampton was living in China with his wife and two children, and teaching at an international English-speaking school in Shanghai in the school Shanghai Singapore International School.
