= 2026 New Zealand NBL season =

- League: New Zealand NBL
- Sport: Basketball
- Duration: 9 April – 9 August
- Games: 20
- Teams: 11

Regular season
- Minor premiers: Auckland Tuatara
- Season MVP: Elijah Pepper (Wellington Saints)
- Top scorer: Elijah Pepper (Wellington Saints)

Finals
- Champions: Southland Sharks
- Runners-up: Wellington Saints
- Grand Final MVP: Sam Timmins (Southland Sharks)

New Zealand NBL seasons
- ← 2025 2027 →

The 2026 NBL season was the 45th season of the National Basketball League. The league fielded 11 teams.

The 2026 regular season commenced on 9 April, with the finals taking place from 29 July to 9 August.

== Team information ==
Team	City	Arena	Colours	Head coach	Import	Import	Import
Auckland Tuatara	Auckland	Eventfinda Stadium		(Australia) Cameron Gliddon	(Australia) Sean Bairstow	(United States) Josh Dilling	(United States) Chris Johnson
Canterbury Rams	Christchurch	Parakiore Recreation and Sport Centre		(New Zealand) Quinn Clinton	(Cameroon) Tamenang Choh	(United States) René Rougeau	(United States) Todd Withers
Franklin Bulls	Pukekohe	Franklin Pool and Leisure Centre		(United States) Dan Ryan	(United States) Derrin Boyd	(United States) Jace Carter	(United States) Carter Whitt
Hawke's Bay Hawks	Napier	Pettigrew Green Arena		(Australia) Will Lopez	(Australia) Daniel Grida	(United States) Chase Jeter	(United States) Jeremy McLaughlin
Manawatu Jets	Palmerston North	Arena Manawatu		(United States) Tony Webster	(United States) Isiah Small	(United States) Kaden Sand	
Nelson Giants	Nelson	Trafalgar Centre		(New Zealand) Michael Fitchett	(Finland) Eemi Luukkonen	(United States) Shane Gatling	(United States) Daniel Saylor
Otago Nuggets	Dunedin	Edgar Centre		(United States) Jeff Sparrow	(United States) Alain Louis	(Australia) Craig Moller	(Ethiopia) Buay Tuach
Southland Sharks	Invercargill	Stadium Southland		(United States) Jonathan Yim	(United States) Caleb Asberry	(United States) Keylan Boone	(United States) Rylan Jones
Taranaki Airs	New Plymouth	TSB Stadium		(Australia) John White	(United States) Aaron Cook Jr.	(United States) Xavier Green	(United States) Brandon Stroud
Tauranga Whai	Tauranga	Mercury Baypark		(New Zealand) Matt Lacey	(Australia) Nicholas Stoddart	(Australia) Nicolas Tata	
Wellington Saints	Wellington	TSB Bank Arena		(New Zealand) Aaron Young	(Australia) Akech Aliir	(United States) Donte Ingram	(Australia) Elijah Pepper

== Summary ==
=== Regular season standings ===
Pos	Team	Pld	W	L	Qualification
1	Auckland Tuatara	20	16	4	Semi Finals
2	Canterbury Rams	20	16	4	Semi Finals
3	Southland Sharks	20	16	4	Elimination Finals
4	Wellington Saints	20	15	5	Elimination Finals
5	Otago Nuggets	20	10	10	Elimination Finals
6	Tauranga Whai	20	8	12	Elimination Finals
7	Manawatu Jets	20	8	12	
8	Nelson Giants	20	6	14	
9	Franklin Bulls	20	6	14	
10	Taranaki Airs	20	6	14	
11	Hawke's Bay Hawks	20	3	17	

Source: NZNBL

=== Finals ===
Elimination Finals
4	Wellington Saints	94
5	Otago Nuggets	81
3	Southland Sharks	96
6	Tauranga Whai	81

Semi Finals
1	Auckland Tuatara	69
4	Wellington Saints	112
2	Canterbury Rams	74
3	Southland Sharks	84

Final
Wellington Saints	101
Southland Sharks	104

== Awards ==
=== Statistics leaders ===
Stats as of the end of the regular season

Category	Player	Team	Stat
Points per game	Elijah Pepper	Wellington Saints	28.7
Rebounds per game	Jace Carter; Sam Timmins	Franklin Bulls; Southland Sharks	11.0
Assists per game	Carter Whitt	Franklin Bulls	9.5
Steals per game	Rylan Jones	Southland Sharks	2.9
Blocks per game	Sam Timmins	Southland Sharks	2.1

=== Regular season ===
- Most Valuable Player: Elijah Pepper (Wellington Saints)
- Most Outstanding Guard: Elijah Pepper (Wellington Saints)
- Most Outstanding NZ Guard: Taylor Britt (Canterbury Rams)
- Most Outstanding Forward: Sam Timmins (Southland Sharks)
- Most Outstanding NZ Forward/Centre: Sam Timmins (Southland Sharks)
- Scoring Champion: Elijah Pepper (Wellington Saints)
- Rebounding Champion: Jace Carter (Franklin Bulls) & Sam Timmins (Southland Sharks)
- Assist Champion: Carter Whitt (Franklin Bulls)
- Most Improved Player: Walter Brown (Canterbury Rams)
- Defensive Player of the Year: Sam Timmins (Southland Sharks)
- Youth Player of the Year: Jake Holmes (Canterbury Rams)
- Sixth Man of the Year: Tom Vodanovich (Auckland Tuatara)
- Fan MVP: Rylan Jones (Southland Sharks)
- Coach of the Year: Quinn Clinton (Canterbury Rams)
- All-Star Five:
  - G: Taylor Britt (Canterbury Rams)
  - G: Elijah Pepper (Wellington Saints)
  - F: Tamenang Choh (Canterbury Rams)
  - F: Reuben Te Rangi (Tauranga Whai)
  - C: Sam Timmins (Southland Sharks)

=== Finals ===
- Grand Final MVP: Sam Timmins (Southland Sharks)
