= Taylor Britt =

New Zealand basketball player

No. 5 – Canterbury Rams
- Position: Point guard
- League: NZNBL

Personal information
- Born: 22 September 1996 (age 30) Christchurch, New Zealand
- Listed height: 187 cm (6 ft 2 in)
- Listed weight: 77 kg (170 lb)

Career information
- High school: Papanui (Christchurch, New Zealand)
- College: Southeast CC (2015–2017)
- NBA draft: 2018: undrafted
- Playing career: 2015–present

Career history
- 2015; 2018–2020: Canterbury Rams
- 2019–2021: Perth Wildcats
- 2022–present: Canterbury Rams
- 2025–2026: New Zealand Breakers

Career highlights
- NBL champion (2020); NBL Ignite Cup winner (2026); 2× NZNBL champion (2023, 2024); 2× NZNBL All-Star Five (2024, 2026); 2× NZNBL Most Outstanding NZ Guard (2024, 2026); NZNBL Most Improved Player (2024)

Taylor Britt (born 22 September 1996) is a New Zealand professional basketball player for the Canterbury Rams of the New Zealand National Basketball League (NZNBL). He debuted for the Rams in 2015, going on to help the team win back-to-back NZNBL championships in 2023 and 2024. Between 2019 and 2021, he was a member of the Perth Wildcats of the Australian NBL, where he won a NBL championship in 2020. He joined the New Zealand Breakers in 2025.

== Early life and career ==
Britt was born in Christchurch, New Zealand. He attended Papanui High School and was part of the Mainland Eagles Academy. He played Canterbury representative basketball from U13 to U23 level, and played touch rugby and softball at the representative level.

Britted debuted for the Canterbury Rams of the New Zealand National Basketball League (NZNBL) in the 2015 season.

== College career ==
Britt played college basketball in the United States for Southeast Community College between 2015 and 2017. In 58 games over two seasons, he averaged 11.2 points per game.

== Professional career ==
Britt returned to the Canterbury Rams for the 2018 New Zealand NBL season. He played a third season for the Rams in 2019.

In August 2019, Britt signed with the Perth Wildcats of the Australian National Basketball League (NBL) as a development player for the 2019–20 season. He made 16 appearances in 2019–20 and suited up for all three games of the 2020 NBL Grand Final, earning an NBL championship ring in his first season.

Britt returned to the Rams in 2020, averaging 19.5 points per game during the Hub Showdown.

In August 2020, Britt re-signed with the Wildcats as a development player for the 2020–21 NBL season. He appeared in 13 games for the Wildcats in his second season. He was set to re-join the Rams for the 2021 New Zealand NBL season, but did not end up playing.

Britt returned to the Rams for the 2022 season and continued with the team in the 2023 season. He helped the Rams win the championship in 2023.

With the Rams in 2024, Britt was named NZNBL Most Outstanding NZ Guard, NZNBL Most Improved Player and NZNBL All-Star Five. He averaged 16.3 points and a career-high 6.3 assists per game. He helped the Rams win back-to-back championships.

Britt returned to the Rams in 2025 for his eighth season, where he averaged 15.6 points and 5.9 assists per game.

On 14 April 2025, Britt signed with the New Zealand Breakers for the 2025–26 NBL season.

Britt re-joined the Rams for the 2026 season. He was named NZNBL All-Star Five and NZNBL Most Outstanding NZ Guard for the second time.

== National team career ==
In 2018, Britt was a member of the New Zealand Select Team that undertook a five-game tour of China. In 2019, he represented New Zealand at the FIBA U23 3×3 World Cup in China.

Britt made his debut for the New Zealand men's national basketball team in 2021 during the FIBA Asia Cup qualifiers. He went on to play for the Tall Blacks at the 2022 FIBA Asia Cup, 2023 FIBA World Cup Asian qualifiers, 2023 FIBA Basketball World Cup, and 2025 FIBA Asia Cup qualifiers. At the 2025 FIBA Asia Cup, he averaged 15 points per game for the Tall Blacks.

In November 2025, Britt was named in the Tall Blacks squad for the first window of the FIBA Basketball World Cup 2027 Asian Qualifiers. In February 2026, he was named in the squad for two more Asian qualifiers. In June 2026, he was named in the squad for another two Asian qualifiers.
