= 2024 New Zealand NBL season =

- League: New Zealand NBL
- Sport: Basketball
- Duration: 27 March – 28 July
- Games: 20
- Teams: 11

Regular season
- Minor premiers: Canterbury Rams
- Season MVP: Lachlan Olbrich (Canterbury Rams)
- Top scorer: Luther Muhammad (Franklin Bulls)

Finals
- Champions: Canterbury Rams
- Runners-up: Auckland Tuatara
- Grand Final MVP: Lachlan Olbrich (Canterbury Rams)

New Zealand NBL seasons
- ← 2023 2025 →

The 2024 NBL season was the 43rd season of the National Basketball League. The competition increased to 11 teams in 2024 with the Tauranga Whai joining the league for the first time.

The 2024 season saw the return of a pre-season blitz for the first time since 2018 as well as the introduction of a mid-season trade window.

The regular season commenced on 27 March in Christchurch, with the Canterbury Rams hosting the Nelson Giants at Cowles Stadium, and contained 16 weeks. The 2024 Final 6 featured in home venues, with five games being played on the home court of the highest seeded team from 17 to 28 July. The Rams won their second straight championship in 2024.

== Team information ==
Team	City	Arena	Colours	Head coach	Import	Import	Import
Auckland Tuatara	Auckland	Eventfinda Stadium		(New Zealand) Aaron Young	(Australia) Cameron Gliddon		
Canterbury Rams	Christchurch	Cowles Stadium		(New Zealand) Judd Flavell	(United States) K. J. Buffen	(Australia) Lachlan Olbrich	(United States) M. J. Walker
Franklin Bulls	Auckland	Franklin Pool and Leisure Centre		(Germany) Sebastian Gleim	(United States) Luther Muhammad	(United States) Joshua Scott	(United States) Lee Skinner
Hawke's Bay Hawks	Napier	Pettigrew Green Arena		(Australia) Sam Gruggen	(United States) Isaiah Moore	(United States) Josh Roberts	(United States) Lucas Sutherland
Manawatu Jets	Palmerston North	Arena Manawatu		(New Zealand) Natu Taufale	(United States) Mustapha Heron	(United States) Quashawn Lane	(United States) Kahlil Whitney
Nelson Giants	Nelson	Trafalgar Centre		(New Zealand) Michael Fitchett	(United States) Theo Akwuba	(Australia) Daniel Grida	(United States) Kobe Langley
Otago Nuggets	Dunedin	Edgar Centre		(New Zealand) Brent Matehaere	(United States) Zaccheus Darko-Kelly	(Australia) Ben Henshall	(United States) Kimani Lawrence
Southland Sharks	Invercargill	Stadium Southland		(Australia) Guy Molloy	(United States) Caleb Asberry	(United States) Cooper Robb	
Taranaki Airs	New Plymouth	TSB Stadium		(Australia) Sam Mackinnon	(Australia) Sam Froling	(Australia) Mitch McCarron	(United States) Elijah Minnie
Tauranga Whai	Tauranga	Mercury Baypark		(New Zealand) Matt Lacey	(United States) Phillip Carr	(United States) Demarcus Holland	
Wellington Saints	Wellington	TSB Bank Arena		(New Zealand) Zico Coronel	(Australia) Ben Ayre	(United States) Malik Benlevi	(United States) Terry Henderson

== Summary ==
=== Regular season standings ===
Pos	Team	W	L	Qualification
1	Canterbury Rams	17	3	Semi Finals
2	Auckland Tuatara	16	4	Semi Finals
3	Taranaki Airs	14	6	Play-in
4	Wellington Saints	14	6	Play-in
5	Franklin Bulls	13	7	Play-in
6	Nelson Giants	8	12	Play-in
7	Hawke's Bay Hawks	8	12	
8	Tauranga Whai	8	12	
9	Otago Nuggets	7	13	
10	Southland Sharks	4	16	
11	Manawatu Jets	1	19	

Source: NZNBL

=== Finals ===
Play-In Matches
3	Taranaki Airs	87
6	Nelson Giants	74
4	Wellington Saints	67
5	Franklin Bulls	104

Semi Finals
1	Canterbury Rams	112
3	Taranaki Airs	111
2	Auckland Tuatara	78
5	Franklin Bulls	75

Final
Canterbury Rams	102
Auckland Tuatara	87

== Awards ==
=== Performance of the Week ===
Round	Player	Team	Ref
1	Hyrum Harris	Wellington Saints	
2	Keanu Rasmussen	Hawke's Bay Hawks	
3	M. J. Walker	Canterbury Rams	
4	Lachlan Olbrich	Canterbury Rams	
5	Isaiah Moore	Hawke's Bay Hawks	
6	Tai Webster	Otago Nuggets	
7	Isaiah Moore	Hawke's Bay Hawks	
8	Isaac Davidson	Franklin Bulls	
9	Te Tuhi Lewis	Tauranga Whai	
10	Izayah Le'afa	Wellington Saints	
11	Ben Ayre	Wellington Saints	
12	Izayah Le'afa	Wellington Saints	
13	K. J. Buffen	Canterbury Rams	
14	Callum McRae	Southland Sharks	
15	Josh Roberts	Hawke's Bay Hawks	
16	Isaiah Moore	Hawke's Bay Hawks	

=== Statistics leaders ===
Stats as of the end of the regular season

Category	Player	Team	Stat
Points per game	Luther Muhammad	Franklin Bulls	25.7
Rebounds per game	Josh Roberts	Hawke's Bay Hawks	13.2
Assists per game	Corey Webster	Auckland Tuatara	7.7
Steals per game	Kobe Langley	Nelson Giants	2.7
Blocks per game	Josh Roberts; Sam Timmins	Hawke's Bay Hawks; Otago Nuggets	1.7

=== Regular season ===
- Most Valuable Player: Lachlan Olbrich (Canterbury Rams)
- Most Outstanding Guard: Luther Muhammad (Franklin Bulls)
- Most Outstanding NZ Guard: Taylor Britt (Canterbury Rams)
- Most Outstanding Forward: Lachlan Olbrich (Canterbury Rams)
- Most Outstanding NZ Forward/Centre: Robert Loe (Auckland Tuatara)
- Scoring Champion: Luther Muhammad (Franklin Bulls)
- Rebounding Champion: Josh Roberts (Hawke's Bay Hawks)
- Assist Champion: Corey Webster (Auckland Tuatara)
- Most Improved Player: Taylor Britt (Canterbury Rams)
- Defensive Player of the Year: Robert Loe (Auckland Tuatara)
- Youth Player of the Year: Lachlan Olbrich (Canterbury Rams)
- Coach of the Year: Judd Flavell (Canterbury Rams)
- All-Star Five:
  - G: Taylor Britt (Canterbury Rams)
  - G: Isaiah Moore (Hawke's Bay Hawks)
  - F: Luther Muhammad (Franklin Bulls)
  - F: Robert Loe (Auckland Tuatara)
  - C: Lachlan Olbrich (Canterbury Rams)

=== Finals ===
- Grand Final MVP: Lachlan Olbrich (Canterbury Rams)
