= Phill Jones =

New Zealand basketball player

Nelson Giants
- Title: Assistant coach
- League: NZNBL

Personal information
- Born: 25 January 1974 (age 52) Christchurch, New Zealand
- Listed height: 196 cm (6 ft 5 in)
- Listed weight: 90 kg (198 lb)

Career information
- High school: Inangahua College (Inangahua Junction, New Zealand); Nelson College (Nelson, New Zealand)
- Playing career: 1993–2017
- Position: Shooting guard
- Coaching career: 2016–2019

Career history

Playing
- 1993–1998: Nelson Giants
- 1998–1999: Kouvot
- 1999: Otago Nuggets
- 2000–2004: Nelson Giants
- 2000–2001: Kouvot
- 2001–2002: Honka Espoo
- 2002: Kouvot
- 2002–2003: Cantù
- 2003–2004: New Zealand Breakers
- 2004–2007: Cantù
- 2006: Nelson Giants
- 2007–2009: New Zealand Breakers
- 2008–2017: Nelson Giants
- 2009–2011: Cairns Taipans

Coaching
- 2016: Nelson Sparks
- 2017; 2019; 2025–: Nelson Giants (assistant)

Career highlights
- 2× NZNBL champion (1994, 1998); NZNBL MVP (2009); 2× NZNBL Most Outstanding Guard (1998, 2001); 5× NZNBL All-Star Five (1996, 1998, 1999, 2001, 2009); Korisliiga champion (1999); NBL Best Sixth Man (2009); No. 13 retired by the Nelson Giants

Phillip Charles George Jones (born 25 January 1974) is a New Zealand basketball coach and former player. He played in Australia, Finland, and Italy, but is best known for his 22 seasons with the Nelson Giants in the New Zealand National Basketball League (NZNBL). He also played for 14 years for the New Zealand national team. As of 2025, he serves as assistant coach of the Nelson Giants.

== Early life ==
Born in Christchurch on 25 January 1974, the son of John and Carol Jones, Jones grew up in Reefton, where he attended Inangahua College. In 1992, Jones moved to Nelson to play high school basketball at Nelson College.

== Professional career ==
Jones debuted in the New Zealand NBL in 1993. He played six seasons for the Nelson Giants between 1993 and 1998, winning championships in 1994 and 1998. After a season in Finland with Kouvot, where he won a championship in the Korisliiga in the 1998–99 season, Jones played for the Otago Nuggets in 1999. He returned to the Giants in 2000 and played every year until 2004.

Jones returned to Kouvot in Finland for the 2000–01 season and then split the 2001–02 season with Honka Espoo and Kouvot. He played the 2002–03 season in Italy with Oregon Scientific Cantù. For the 2003–04 season, Jones joined the New Zealand Breakers for their inaugural season in the Australian National Basketball League (NBL). After one season with the Breakers, Jones spent three straight seasons in Italy with Cantù between 2004 and 2007.

After not playing in the 2005 New Zealand NBL season, Jones re-joined the Giants in 2006. He then missed the 2007 New Zealand NBL season and thus missed out on the Giants' championship.

Between 2007 and 2009, Jones played another two seasons for the Breakers and was named the NBL Best Sixth Man for the 2008–09 season. Between 2009 and 2011, he played for the Cairns Taipans and helped them reach the grand final series in the 2010–11 season.

Jones played every season for the Giants between 2008 and 2017.

In May 2014, Jones played his 350th game for the Giants and set the NZNBL's all-time record for games played with his 362nd game. He finished the 2014 season with 369 games.

Jones initially retired in 2014 and became the Giants' managing director. However, in March 2015, he came out of retirement and re-joined the Giants roster. He continued on with the Giants in 2016 as well. In 2016, he passed 7,000 points for his NZNBL career and became the first player in New Zealand NBL history to reach 400 games.

Jones retired again in 2016 and became an assistant coach for the Giants in 2017. He was also appointed the Giants' director of operations. However, in May 2017, Jones played two final games for the Giants, ending his NZNBL career with 408 games.

Jones' number 13 jersey was retired twice by the Giants, firstly in June 2014 and then again in June 2017.

In May 2022, Jones was inducted into the Basketball New Zealand Hall of Fame.

== National team career ==
In June 2008, after playing for the Tall Blacks for 14 years, Jones retired from international basketball.

== Coaching career ==
In 2016, Jones served as head coach of the Nelson Sparks in New Zealand's Women's Basketball Championship (WBC).

Jones served as assistant coach for the Nelson Giants in 2017 and 2019. He re-joined the Giants as assistant coach in 2025, and continued in 2026.

== Personal life ==
Jones and his wife Kat have three children. Their son Hayden debuted with the Nelson Giants in 2023 as a 16-year-old, and is a member of the New Zealand team at the 2025 FIBA Under-19 Basketball World Cup.
