= Paul Henare =

New Zealand professional basketball player and coach

Ibaraki Robots
- Title: Head coach
- League: B.League

Personal information
- Born: 4 March 1979 (age 47) Napier, New Zealand
- Listed height: 1.82 m (6 ft 0 in)
- Listed weight: 83 kg (183 lb)

Career information
- High school: Napier Boys' (Napier, New Zealand)
- College: Utah Valley (1999–2000)
- Playing career: 1995–2014
- Position: Point guard
- Coaching career: 2011–present

Career history

Playing
- 1995–1997: Hawke's Bay Hawks
- 1998–2001: Auckland Stars
- 2002–2008: Hawke's Bay Hawks
- 2002–2003: OKK Beograd
- 2003–2011: New Zealand Breakers
- 2006: Banvit B.K.
- 2009: Christchurch Cougars
- 2010: Hawke's Bay Hawks
- 2014: Southland Sharks

Coaching
- 2011–2012: Hawke's Bay Hawks
- 2013–2015: Southland Sharks
- 2013–2016: New Zealand Breakers (assistant)
- 2016–2018: New Zealand Breakers
- 2018–2019: Melbourne United (assistant)
- 2019: Wellington Saints
- 2019–2021: Kagawa Five Arrows
- 2021–2025: Shimane Susanoo Magic
- 2025–2026: Nagasaki Velca (assistant)
- 2026–present: Ibaraki Robots

Career highlights
- As player: NBL champion (2011); 3× NZNBL champion (1999, 2000, 2006); 5× NZNBL assist champion (2001, 2004, 2005, 2007, 2009); No. 32 retired by New Zealand Breakers; No. 32 retired by Big Barrel Hawke’s Bay Hawks; As coach: 3× NZNBL champion (2013, 2015, 2019); 3× NZNBL Coach of the Year (2012, 2013, 2015)
Medals
Men's basketball
Representing New Zealand
Commonwealth Games
| Silver medal – second place | 2006 Melbourne | Team competition |

Paul Donald Henare (born 4 March 1979) is a New Zealand professional basketball coach and former player. He currently serves as the head coach for the Ibaraki Robots of the Japanese B.League.

== Early life ==
Henare was born in Napier, New Zealand. He attended Napier Boys' High School and played one season of college basketball for Utah Valley State College.

== Professional career ==
=== New Zealand NBL ===
Henare began his playing career in 1995 with the Hawke's Bay Hawks. After three seasons with the Hawks, he joined the Auckland Stars, where he won championships in 1999 and 2000. He returned to Hawke's Bay in 2002 and played the next seven seasons there, helping the Hawks win their inaugural championship in 2006. In 2009, he played for the Christchurch Cougars, and in 2010, he played his final season with the Hawks. On 30 May 2014, Henare came out of retirement to be the temporary player/coach of the Southland Sharks after multiple players were suspended.

=== New Zealand Breakers and overseas ===
After a season abroad in Serbia with OKK Beograd in 2002–03, Henare debuted with the New Zealand Breakers in their inaugural season in the NBL in 2003–04. In 2006, he had his second overseas stint, this time in Turkey with Banvit B.K.

In 2010–11, Henare was a member of the Breakers' maiden championship-winning team. He subsequently retired from the Breakers after eight seasons and was honoured by becoming the first Breakers player to have his number (32) retired.

=== National team ===
Henare debuted for the Tall Blacks in 1998, with his first major tournament being the Sydney Olympics in 2000. His final outing with the Tall Blacks came in 2007 with the FIBA Oceania Championship.

== Coaching career ==
=== New Zealand NBL ===
Henare made his coaching debut in 2011 as head coach of the Hawke's Bay Hawks. After two seasons with the Hawks, he served as head coach of the Southland Sharks in 2013, 2014 and 2015, winning championships in 2013 and 2015. In 2019, he returned to the New Zealand NBL for the first time since 2015, coaching the Wellington Saints to the championship.

=== Australian NBL ===
Between 2013 and 2016, Henare served as an assistant coach with the New Zealand Breakers. He was promoted to head coach for the 2016–17 season, but after two seasons, he stepped down from the role.

For the 2018–19 NBL season, Henare served as an assistant coach with Melbourne United. He departed United in October 2019 to take up a head coaching opportunity in Japan.

=== National team ===
Between 2012 and 2015, Henare served as an assistant coach with the New Zealand Tall Blacks. Between 2015 and 2019, he served as head coach of the Tall Blacks.

=== Japan ===
In October 2019, Henare signed a three-year deal as head coach of Japanese second division club, Kagawa Five Arrows.

In July 2021, Henare was appointed head coach of Shimane Susanoo Magic.

On 28 July 2025, Henare was appointed associate head coach of Nagasaki Velca.
