= Glen Denham =

New Zealand basketball player

Personal information
- Born: 1963 or 1964 (age 61–62) Dunedin, New Zealand

Career information
- High school: King's (Dunedin, New Zealand)
- Playing career: 1986–1999

Glen Ivan Denham (born 1963 or 1964) is a New Zealand educationalist and former basketball player. He is of Māori descent.

== Early life ==
Denham was born in Dunedin, New Zealand, the son of a teacher and butcher. His father was Australian and his mother was of Māori descent. He is the second of three children and grew up in Corstorphine, where he attended Corstorphine Primary School, and later Macandrew Intermediate School. Denham went to King's High School from 1977 to 1982, where he was Head Boy. Whilst attending King's, Denham played cricket and hit 100 runs against Shirley Boys in 1982, and won the Salter Trophy, which is awarded to the school's sportsman of the year. Denham attended Otago University in 1982, where he met his future wife and graduated with a Bachelor of Teaching. Whilst at university, Denham played for the Otago University men's basketball club.

== Basketball career ==
Denham made his NBL debut in 1986 for the Waikato Pistons, later moving to play for the Canterbury Rams, winning championships in 1989 and 1990. He moved back to Dunedin, where his 1991 debut for the Otago Nuggets ranked number 121 in the Otago Daily Times 2011 list of greatest moments in Otago sport. Denham left the club in 1997, but returned in 1999. During his international career between 1984 and 1999, he captained the Tall Blacks for 13 years, setting a record as the longest standing captain in Tall Blacks history. He was also named most outstanding New Zealand forward three times. He played in the 1986 FIBA World Championship, where New Zealand placed 13th, with Denham averaging seven points per game.

== Education career ==
Denham spent 15 years working at schools in the United Kingdom, before returning to New Zealand as principal of Massey High School. In 2022, he was appointed Headmaster of Wellington College.

In early April 2024, Denham was appointed by Associate Education Minister David Seymour to an eight-member Charter School Establishment Board tasked with facilitating the reintroduction of charter schools in New Zealand.
