= 1996 New Zealand NBL season =

- League: New Zealand NBL
- Sport: Basketball
- Number of teams: 12

Regular season
- Minor premiers: Auckland
- Top scorer: Ed Book (Palmerston North)

Playoffs
- Champions: Auckland
- Runners-up: Nelson

New Zealand NBL seasons
- ← 1995 1997 →

The 1996 NBL season was the 15th season of the National Basketball League. Only one change occurred heading into the 1996 season, with Waitakere leaving the NBL for the second-tiered Conference Basketball League (CBL). Auckland won the championship in 1996 to claim their fourth league title. In the best-of-three championship series, Nelson took Game 1 110–95, before Auckland came back to take Game 2 109–98 and Game 3 94–90.

== Final standings ==
#	Team
	Auckland
Silver medal	Nelson
3	North Harbour
4	Hawke's Bay
5	Wellington
6	Hutt Valley
7	Otago
8	Canterbury
9	Palmerston North
10	Taranaki
11	Northland
12	Waikato

== Season awards ==
- NZ Most Valuable Player: Phill Jones (Nelson)
- Most Outstanding Guard: Tony Bennett (North Harbour)
- Most Outstanding NZ Guard: Phill Jones (Nelson)
- Most Outstanding Forward: Ed Book (Palmerston North)
- Most Outstanding NZ Forward/Centre: Pero Cameron (Auckland)
- Scoring Champion: Ed Book (Palmerston North)
- Rebounding Champion: Jeff Daniels (North Harbour)
- Assist Champion: Scott Stewart (Canterbury)
- Rookie of the Year: Paora Winitana (North Harbour)
- Coach of the Year: Nenad Vučinić (Nelson)
- All-Star Five:
  - G: Tony Bennett (North Harbour)
  - G: Phill Jones (Nelson)
  - F: Darryl Johnson (Hutt Valley)
  - F: Pero Cameron (Auckland)
  - C: Ed Book (Palmerston North)
