= 2001 New Zealand NBL season =

- League: New Zealand NBL
- Sport: Basketball
- Number of games: 16
- Number of teams: 9

Regular season
- Minor premiers: Waikato Titans
- Top scorer: Clifton Bush (Waikato Titans)

Playoffs
- Champions: Waikato Titans
- Runners-up: Wellington Saints

New Zealand NBL seasons
- ← 2000 2002 →

The 2001 NBL season was the 20th season of the National Basketball League. The Waikato Titans won the championship in 2001 to claim their first league title. The Titans set an NBL record with a 15-game winning streak during the season, a streak that was not broken until the 2015 Southland Sharks squad recorded a 16-game winning streak.

== Summary ==
=== Regular season standings ===
Pos
Pos	Team	W	L
1	Waikato Titans	15	1
2	Nelson Giants	11	5
3	Wellington Saints	10	6
4	Auckland Stars	9	7
5	Palmerston North Jets	8	8
6	Canterbury Rams	7	9
7	North Harbour Kings	5	11
8	Hawke's Bay Hawks	4	12
9	Otago Nuggets	3	13

=== Playoff bracket ===
Semi-finals
1	Waikato Titans	93
4	Auckland Stars	88
2	Nelson Giants	88
3	Wellington Saints	98

Final
Waikato Titans	112
Wellington Saints	97

== Awards ==
=== Statistics leaders ===
Stats as of the end of the regular season

Category	Player	Team	Stat
Points per game	Clifton Bush	Waikato Titans	27.4
Rebounds per game	Brian Gomes	North Harbour Kings	14.4
Assists per game	Paul Henare	Auckland Stars	5.1
Steals per game	Travis Lane	Otago Nuggets	3.0
Blocks per game	Ben Pepper & Ed Book	Auckland Stars & Palmerston North Jets	1.3

=== Regular season ===
- NZ Most Valuable Player: Phill Jones (Nelson Giants)
- Most Outstanding Guard: Phill Jones (Nelson Giants)
- Most Outstanding NZ Guard: Phill Jones (Nelson Giants)
- Most Outstanding Forward: Clifton Bush (Waikato Titans)
- Most Outstanding NZ Forward/Centre: Terrence Lewis (Canterbury Rams)
- Scoring Champion: Clifton Bush (Waikato Titans)
- Rebounding Champion: Brian Gomes (North Harbour Kings)
- Assist Champion: Paul Henare (Auckland Stars)
- Rookie of the Year: Damon Rampton (Nelson Giants)
- Coach of the Year: Nenad Vučinić (Nelson Giants)
- All-Star Five:
  - G: Hayden Allen (Otago Nuggets)
  - G: Phill Jones (Nelson Giants)
  - F: Clifton Bush (Waikato Titans)
  - F: Brian Gomes (North Harbour Kings)
  - C: Pero Cameron (Waikato Titans)
