= 1991 New Zealand NBL season =

- League: New Zealand NBL
- Sport: Basketball
- Number of teams: 12

Regular season
- Minor premiers: Hutt Valley
- Top scorer: Ronnie Joyner (Waikato)

Playoffs
- Champions: Hutt Valley
- Runners-up: Wellington

New Zealand NBL seasons
- ← 1990 1992 →

The 1991 NBL season was the tenth season of the National Basketball League. Hutt Valley won the championship in 1991 to claim their first league title.

== Final standings ==
#	Team
	Hutt Valley
Silver medal	Wellington
3	New Plymouth
4	Otago
5	Nelson
6	Canterbury
7	North Harbour
8	Waitakere
9	Palmerston North
10	Hawke's Bay
11	Waikato
12	Auckland

== Season awards ==
- NZ Most Valuable Player: Byron Vaetoe (New Plymouth)
- Most Outstanding Guard: Eddie Anderson (Canterbury)
- Most Outstanding NZ Guard: Byron Vaetoe (New Plymouth)
- Most Outstanding Forward: Darryl Johnson (Hutt Valley)
- Most Outstanding NZ Forward/Centre: Peter Pokai (Hutt Valley)
- Scoring Champion: Ronnie Joyner (Waikato)
- Rebounding Champion: Willie Burton (New Plymouth)
- Assist Champion: Kenny McFadden (Wellington)
- Young Player of the Year: Warren Adams (Hutt Valley)
- Coach of the Year: Jeff Green (Hutt Valley)
- All-Star Five:
  - Eddie Anderson (Canterbury)
  - Kerry Boagni (Wellington)
  - Tony Brown (Hutt Valley)
  - Willie Burton (New Plymouth)
  - Darryl Johnson (Hutt Valley)
