= 1992 New Zealand NBL season =

- League: New Zealand NBL
- Sport: Basketball
- Number of teams: 12

Regular season
- Minor premiers: New Plymouth
- Top scorer: Kerry Boagni (Wellington)

Playoffs
- Champions: Canterbury
- Runners-up: Palmerston North

New Zealand NBL seasons
- ← 1991 1993 →

The 1992 NBL season was the 11th season of the National Basketball League. Canterbury won the championship in 1992 to claim their fourth league title. They qualified in fourth place for the six-team finals and beat Otago and Hutt Valley to book a spot in the decider. Canterbury's grand final experience proved decisive, overcoming Palmerston North by eight points, 79–71.

== Final standings ==
#	Team
	Canterbury
Silver medal	Palmerston North
3	New Plymouth
4	Hutt Valley
5	Nelson
6	Otago
7	Hawke's Bay
8	Auckland
9	Waitakere
10	Waikato
11	Wellington
12	North Harbour

== Season awards ==
- NZ Most Valuable Player: Neil Stephens (Wellington)
- Most Outstanding Guard: Tyrone Brown (New Plymouth)
- Most Outstanding NZ Guard: Warwick Meehl (Waitakere)
- Most Outstanding Forward: Donnell Thomas (Nelson)
- Most Outstanding NZ Forward/Centre: Neil Stephens (Wellington)
- Scoring Champion: Kerry Boagni (Wellington)
- Rebounding Champion: Joe Turner (Waitakere)
- Assist Champion: Tyrone Brown (New Plymouth)
- Rookie of the Year: Pero Cameron (Waikato)
- Coach of the Year: Steve McKean (New Plymouth)
- All-Star Five:
  - Tony Brown (Hutt Valley)
  - Tyrone Brown (New Plymouth)
  - Willie Burton (New Plymouth)
  - DeWayne McCray (Palmerston North)
  - Donnell Thomas (Nelson)
