= 1990 New Zealand NBL season =

- League: New Zealand NBL
- Sport: Basketball
- Number of teams: 12

Regular season
- Minor premiers: Nelson
- Top scorer: Jamie Dixon (Hawke's Bay)

Playoffs
- Champions: Canterbury
- Runners-up: Nelson

New Zealand NBL seasons
- ← 1989 1991 →

The 1990 NBL season was the ninth season of the National Basketball League. The league expanded to 12 teams in 1990, with Hutt Valley, Otago and Waitakere joining the ranks. Waitakere replaced the outgoing Waitemata after Waitemata City amalgamated to form Waitakere City. In addition, North Shore was renamed North Harbour. Canterbury won the championship in 1990 to claim their third league title. In the NBL's first all-South Island final, Canterbury prevailed over Nelson in a gripping game, winning 76–73 to go back-to-back.

== Final standings ==
#	Team
	Canterbury
Silver medal	Nelson
3	Palmerston North
4	Hutt Valley
5	New Plymouth
6	North Harbour
7	Wellington
8	Hawke's Bay
9	Waitakere
10	Waikato
11	Otago
12	Auckland

== Season awards ==
- Most Outstanding Guard: Jamie Dixon (Hawke's Bay)
- Most Outstanding NZ Guard: Byron Vaetoe (New Plymouth)
- Most Outstanding Forward: Kerry Boagni (Wellington)
- Most Outstanding NZ Forward/Centre: Glen Denham (Canterbury)
- Scoring Champion: Jamie Dixon (Hawke's Bay)
- Rebounding Champion: Willie Burton (Palmerston North)
- Assist Champion: Chris Harper (New Plymouth)
- Young Player of the Year: Kent Mori (Palmerston North)
- Coach of the Year: Matt Ruscoe (Nelson)
- All-Star Five:
  - Kerry Boagni (Wellington)
  - Willie Burton (Palmerston North)
  - Jamie Dixon (Hawke's Bay)
  - Kenny Stone (Nelson)
  - Nenad Vučinić (Nelson)
