= Waitemata Dolphins =

- Leagues: National Basketball League
- Established: 1982
- Folded: 1989
- History: Waitemata Dolphins; 1982–1983; 1988–1989
- Arena: Auckland YMCA
- Location: Auckland, New Zealand
- Team colours: Green & black
- Championships: 0

The Waitemata Dolphins were a New Zealand basketball team based in Auckland. The Dolphins competed in the National Basketball League (NBL) and played their home games at Auckland YMCA.

== Team history ==
The Waitemata Dolphins were a foundation member of the National Basketball League (NBL) in 1982. They were runners-up in the league's inaugural season before finishing fourth in 1983. They subsequently withdrew from the NBL, and in 1985, they finished second in the Northern Conference of the second-tiered Conference Basketball League (CBL). After winning the CBL championship in 1987, Waitemata returned to the NBL for the 1988 season. They finished seventh in 1988 and ninth in 1989. Waitemata ceased to exist following the 1989 season.
