= 2005 New Zealand NBL season =

- League: New Zealand NBL
- Sport: Basketball
- Duration: 18 March – 8 July
- Games: 18
- Teams: 10

Regular season
- Minor premiers: Auckland Stars
- Season MVP: Lindsay Tait (Auckland Stars)
- Top scorer: Greg Lewis (Waikato Titans)

Playoffs
- Champions: Auckland Stars
- Runners-up: Hawke's Bay Hawks
- Final MVP: Dillon Boucher

New Zealand NBL seasons
- ← 2004 2006 →

The 2005 NBL season was the 24th season of the National Basketball League. The Auckland Stars won the championship in 2005 to claim their ninth league title.

== Summary ==
=== Regular season standings ===
Pos
Pos	Team	W	L
1	Auckland Stars	13	5
2	Hawke's Bay Hawks	13	5
3	Nelson Giants	11	7
4	Waikato Titans	11	7
5	Canterbury Rams	10	8
6	Taranaki Mountainairs	9	9
7	Harbour Heat	8	10
8	Wellington Saints	7	11
9	Manawatu Jets	6	12
10	Otago Nuggets	2	16

=== Playoff bracket ===
Semi-finals
1	Auckland Stars	81
2	Hawke's Bay Hawks	92
3	Nelson Giants	77
4	Waikato Titans	65

Minor Final
1	Auckland Stars	84
3	Nelson Giants	54

Final
Hawke's Bay Hawks	68
Auckland Stars	69

== Awards ==
=== Player of the Week ===
Round	Player	Team	Ref
1	Jacob Holmes	Nelson Giants	
2	Ryan Prillman	Canterbury Rams	
3	Ryan Prillman	Canterbury Rams	
4	Casey Frank	Auckland Stars	
5	Casey Frank	Auckland Stars	
6	Adrian Majstrovich	Hawke's Bay Hawks	
7	Mike King	Harbour Heat	
8	Tony Rampton	Taranaki Mountainairs	
9	Paul Henare	Hawke's Bay Hawks	
10	Ryan Prillman	Canterbury Rams	
11	Mike Bauer	Waikato Titans	
12	Jacob Holmes	Nelson Giants	
13	Michael Gardener	Canterbury Rams	
14	Derek Moore	Hawke's Bay Hawks	
SF	Dusty Rychart	Hawke's Bay Hawks	
MF	Dillon Boucher	Auckland Stars	

=== Statistics leaders ===
Stats as of the end of the regular season

Category	Player	Team	Stat
Points per game	Greg Lewis	Waikato Titans	22.1
Rebounds per game	David Cooper	Manawatu Jets	11.5
Assists per game	Paul Henare	Hawke's Bay Hawks	6.7
Steals per game	Dillon Boucher	Auckland Stars	2.9
Blocks per game	Derek Moore	Hawke's Bay Hawks	2.2

=== Regular season ===
- Most Valuable Player: Lindsay Tait (Auckland Stars)
- NZ Most Valuable Player: Lindsay Tait (Auckland Stars)
- Most Outstanding Guard: Lindsay Tait (Auckland Stars)
- Most Outstanding NZ Guard: Lindsay Tait (Auckland Stars)
- Most Outstanding Forward: Casey Frank (Auckland Stars) & Jacob Holmes (Nelson Giants)
- Most Outstanding NZ Forward/Centre: Mika Vukona (Nelson Giants)
- Scoring Champion: Greg Lewis (Waikato Titans)
- Rebounding Champion: David Cooper (Manawatu Jets)
- Assist Champion: Paul Henare (Hawke's Bay Hawks)
- Young Player of the Year: Jarrod Kenny (Harbour Heat)
- Coach of the Year: Nenad Vučinić (Nelson Giants)
- All-Star Five:
  - G: Paul Henare (Hawke's Bay Hawks)
  - G: Lindsay Tait (Auckland Stars)
  - F: Greg Lewis (Waikato Titans)
  - F: Jacob Holmes (Nelson Giants)
  - C: Casey Frank (Auckland Stars)

=== Playoffs ===
- Final MVP: Dillon Boucher (Auckland Stars)
