= 1994 New Zealand NBL season =

- League: New Zealand NBL
- Sport: Basketball
- Number of teams: 12

Regular season
- Minor premiers: Nelson
- Top scorer: DeWayne McCray (Hutt Valley)

Playoffs
- Champions: Nelson
- Runners-up: Canterbury

New Zealand NBL seasons
- ← 1993 1995 →

The 1994 NBL season was the 13th season of the National Basketball League. Only one change occurred heading into the 1994 season, with New Plymouth now called Taranaki. Nelson won the championship in 1994 to claim their first league title.

== Final standings ==
#	Team
	Nelson
Silver medal	Canterbury
3	Hawke's Bay
4	Auckland
5	Otago
6	Palmerston North
7	North Harbour
8	Taranaki
9	Waikato
10	Wellington
11	Hutt Valley
12	Waitakere

== Season awards ==
- NZ Most Valuable Player: Pero Cameron (Auckland)
- Most Outstanding Guard: Leonard King (Otago)
- Most Outstanding NZ Guard: Chris Tupu (Canterbury)
- Most Outstanding Forward: Darryl Johnson (Nelson)
- Most Outstanding NZ Forward/Centre: Pero Cameron (Auckland)
- Scoring Champion: DeWayne McCray (Hutt Valley)
- Rebounding Champion: Willie Burton (Hawke's Bay)
- Assist Champion: Wayman Strickland (North Harbour)
- Rookie of the Year: Konrad Ross (Waikato)
- Coach of the Year: Trevor Wright (Nelson)
- All-Star Five:
  - G: Leonard King (Otago)
  - G: Tony Brown (Palmerston North)
  - F: Darryl Johnson (Nelson)
  - F: DeWayne McCray (Hutt Valley)
  - C: Pero Cameron (Auckland)
