= Michael Fitchett (basketball) =

New Zealand basketball player

Michael Robert Elmslie Fitchett (born 20 September 1982) is a New Zealand former professional basketball player.

Fitchett was born in Nelson, New Zealand. He attended Nelson College from 1996 to 2000, where he excelled as a sportsman. He was the school's junior athletics champion in 1996 and 1997, played for the 'A' basketball team from 1996 to 2000, and was a member of the 1st XI cricket team from 1996 to 2000. He played in the New Zealand NBL every year between 1999 and 2012. He also played one game in the Australian NBL with the New Zealand Breakers in January 2009. He also represented the New Zealand Tall Blacks multiple times between 2008 and 2011.

In October 2018, Fitchett was appointed head coach of the Nelson Giants for the 2019 season. He was elevated to dual general manager / head coach of the Giants in 2021. He continued in the role in 2022 and won the New Zealand NBL Coach of the Year Award. He remained in the dual role as of the 2024 season. The 2026 season marked his eighth as head coach of the Giants.

Between 2016 and 2019, Fitchett served as an assistant coach with the New Zealand Breakers. In November 2024, he was named an assistant coach for the Tall Blacks for the FIBA Asia Cup qualifiers. In November 2025, he was named as an assistant for the Tall Blacks for the first window of the FIBA Basketball World Cup 2027 Asian Qualifiers. In February 2026, he was named an assistant for two more Asian qualifiers.
