= 1995 New Zealand NBL season =

- League: New Zealand NBL
- Sport: Basketball
- Number of teams: 13

Regular season
- Minor premiers: Auckland
- Top scorer: Dylan Rigdon (Palmerston North)

Playoffs
- Champions: Auckland
- Runners-up: Hawke's Bay

New Zealand NBL seasons
- ← 1994 1996 →

The 1995 NBL season was the 14th season of the National Basketball League. Only one change occurred heading into the 1995 season, with 1994 Conference Basketball League (CBL) champions Northland joining the top-flight league for the first time. Thirteen teams competed in 1995, the most the league has fielded during a season in its history. Auckland won the championship in 1995 to claim their third league title.

== Final standings ==
#	Team
	Auckland
Silver medal	Hawke's Bay
3	Otago
4	Wellington
5	Hutt Valley
6	Canterbury
7	Nelson
8	Taranaki
9	Palmerston North
10	North Harbour
11	Waitakere
12	Waikato
13	Northland

== Season awards ==
- NZ Most Valuable Player: Pero Cameron (Auckland)
- Most Outstanding Guard: Dylan Rigdon (Palmerston North)
- Most Outstanding NZ Guard: Ralph Lattimore (Auckland)
- Most Outstanding Forward: Kenny Stone (Auckland)
- Most Outstanding NZ Forward/Centre: Pero Cameron (Auckland)
- Scoring Champion: Dylan Rigdon (Palmerston North)
- Rebounding Champion: Jeff Smith (Northland)
- Assist Champion: Tony Brown (Hutt Valley)
- Rookie of the Year: Rob Tuilave (Palmerston North)
- Coach of the Year: Tab Baldwin (Auckland)
- All-Star Five:
  - G: Leonard King (Otago)
  - G: Dylan Rigdon (Palmerston North)
  - F: Darryl Johnson (Hawke's Bay)
  - F: Kenny Stone (Auckland)
  - C: Pero Cameron (Auckland)
