= Nenad Vučinić =

Serbian-New Zealand basketball player and coach

Meralco Bolts
- Title: Active consultant
- League: PBA

Personal information
- Born: 7 April 1965 (age 61) Belgrade, SR Serbia, SFR Yugoslavia
- Listed height: 6 ft 4 in (1.93 m)
- Listed weight: 196 lb (89 kg)

Career information
- NBA draft: 1987: undrafted
- Playing career: 1983–2000
- Position: Small forward
- Coaching career: 1996–present

Career history

Playing
- 1983–1985: BASK
- 1985–1987: Radnički Belgrade
- 1987–1988: Slavonka Osijek
- 1988–1989: Kolubara
- 1989–2000: Nelson Giants

Coaching
- 1996–2001: Nelson Giants
- 2001–2006: New Zealand (assistant)
- 2002–2003: OKK Beograd
- 2004–2007: Nelson Giants
- 2006–2014: New Zealand
- 2008–2010: BC Kalev
- 2010–2011: Darüşşafaka S.K.
- 2011–2012: Fulgor Libertas Forlì
- 2012–2013: Fujian Xunxing
- 2014–2017: Byblos Club
- 2018–2019: Sidigas Avellino
- 2019–2020: Kumamoto Volters
- 2020–2021: Fujian Sturgeons
- 2022: Philippines
- 2022–present: Meralco Bolts (consultant)

Career highlights
- As player: 2× New Zealand League champion (1994, 1998); As coach: 5× New Zealand NBL Coach of the Year (1996, 1998, 2001, 2005, 2006); Estonian League Coach of the Year (2009); 3× New Zealand League champion (1994, 1998, 2007); Estonian League champion (2009); Estonian Cup winner (2009); Lebanese Cup winner (2016); As consultant: PBA champion (2024 Philippine); PBA Baby Dalupan Coach of the Year (2024)
Medals
Men's basketball
Head Coach for New Zealand
Oceania Championship
Gold medal – first place	2009 Sydney/Wellington	Team
Silver medal – second place	2013 Auckland/Canberra	Team
Silver medal – second place	2011 Melbourne/Brisbane/Sydney	Team
Silver medal – second place	2007 Brisbane/Sydney/Melbourne	Team

Nenad Vučinić (Serbian Cyrillic: Ненад Вучинић; born 7 April 1965) is a Serbian-New Zealand basketball coach and former player. He was once interim head coach for the Philippines men's national basketball team, with Chot Reyes replacing him in the following 2022 FIBA Asia Cup.

== Playing career ==
As a player, he grew with youth selections of Partizan Belgrade. He played for BASK, Radnički, Kolubara and Slavonka Osijek before flying to New Zealand in 1989 with his wife. There he played for the Nelson Giants of the New Zealand NBL. As a player, Vučinić was voted to the NBL All-Star Five in 1990.

== Coaching career ==
=== New Zealand ===
He is the former head coach of New Zealand men's national basketball team the Tall Blacks. He was also the head coach for Fulgor Libertas Forlì in the Italian second league (Legadue), and for BC Kalev/Cramo, a professional basketball club based in Tallinn, Estonia which participates in Korvpalli Meistriliiga, Baltic Basketball League and VTB United League.

He has won five NBL Coach of the Year titles while guiding Nelson to two titles in 1998 and 2007. He stood down as Giants coach after their most recent success and still holds the record for most NBL coaching wins (164). After six years as an assistant coach, he took over the Tall Blacks reins in 2007, taking them to victory over Australia in the 2009 FIBA Oceania Championship and into the last 16 at the 2010 FIBA World Championship.

=== Italy ===
On 12 June 2018, Vučinić signed a two-year deal with the Italian basketball club Sidigas Avellino of Lega Basket Serie A (LBA). On 10 April 2019 he parted ways with Sidigas Avellino.

=== Philippines ===
In early 2022, Vučinić joined the Philippines men's national basketball team initially as a consultant to head coach Tab Baldwin who resigned shortly after. He would continue working under Chot Reyes. Vučinić would temporarily serve as head coach of the team for the June–July 2022 window of the 2023 FIBA Basketball World Cup Asian qualifiers. After the brief stint, he became an assistant coach to Reyes who reacsumed the position of head coach. In August 2022, Vučinić left the Philippine national team coaching staff. The Samahang Basketbol ng Pilipinas, the national basketball federation of the Philippines, released a statement that Vučinić left the team amicably.

In 2023, he was hired by the Meralco Bolts as their active consultant, and promoting Luigi Trillo as head coach. Vučinić runs practices and gives plays during timeout. He won a championship with the Bolts in the 2024 PBA Philippine Cup. He's the second active consultant to win a championship in PBA history.
