= 1993 New Zealand NBL season =

- League: New Zealand NBL
- Sport: Basketball
- Number of teams: 12

Regular season
- Minor premiers: Canterbury
- Top scorer: Kerry Boagni (Hawke's Bay)

Playoffs
- Champions: Hutt Valley
- Runners-up: Canterbury

New Zealand NBL seasons
- ← 1992 1994 →

The 1993 NBL season was the 12th season of the National Basketball League. Hutt Valley won the championship in 1993 to claim their second league title. Head coach Jeff Green guided Hutt Valley over Canterbury in the final with Peter Pokai hitting the game-winning jumper. It was a special triumph for Green, who was sensationally sacked by the team early in the season, but brought back with seven games to go.

== Final standings ==
#	Team
	Hutt Valley
Silver medal	Canterbury
3	Hawke's Bay
4	New Plymouth
5	Auckland
6	Palmerston North
7	Nelson
8	Waikato
9	Wellington
10	Otago
11	North Harbour
12	Waitakere

== Season awards ==
- NZ Most Valuable Player: Pero Cameron (Waikato)
- Most Outstanding Guard: Terry Giles (Hawke's Bay)
- Most Outstanding NZ Guard: Byron Vaetoe (Hawke's Bay)
- Most Outstanding Forward: Kerry Boagni (Hawke's Bay)
- Most Outstanding NZ Forward/Centre: Neil Stephens (Auckland)
- Scoring Champion: Kerry Boagni (Hawke's Bay)
- Rebounding Champion: Pero Cameron (Waikato)
- Assist Champion: Terry Giles (Hawke's Bay)
- Rookie of the Year: Mark Dickel (Otago)
- Coach of the Year: James Logan (Hawke's Bay)
- All-Star Five:
  - Kerry Boagni (Hawke's Bay)
  - Willie Burton (New Plymouth)
  - Terry Giles (Hawke's Bay)
  - Terrence Lewis (Wellington)
  - Neil Stephens (Auckland)
