= 1982 New Zealand NBL season =

- League: New Zealand NBL
- Sport: Basketball
- Number of teams: 8

Season
- Champions: Auckland
- Runners-up: Waitemata

New Zealand NBL seasons
- 1983 →

The 1982 NBL season was the inaugural season of the National Basketball League. A total of eight teams contested the league in its first season, with Auckland claiming the league's first championship.

== Final standings ==
#	Team
	Auckland
Silver medal	Waitemata
3	Canterbury
4	Centrals
5	Nelson
6	Porirua
7	Hamilton
8	Palmerston North

== Season awards ==
- Most Outstanding Guard: Brent Wright (Nelson)
- Most Outstanding Forward: Stan Hill (Auckland)
- Scoring Champion: Stan Hill (Auckland)
- Rebounding Champion: James Lofton (Porirua)
- All-Star Five:
  - Brian Brumit (Waitemata)
  - Stan Hill (Auckland)
  - James Lofton (Porirua)
  - Jack Maere (Auckland)
  - Brent Wright (Nelson)
