= 1989 New Zealand NBL season =

- League: New Zealand NBL
- Sport: Basketball
- Number of teams: 10

Regular season
- Minor premiers: Palmerston North
- Top scorer: Jamie Dixon (Hawke's Bay)

Playoffs
- Champions: Canterbury
- Runners-up: Auckland

New Zealand NBL seasons
- ← 1988 1990 →

The 1989 NBL season was the eighth season of the National Basketball League. Ponsonby's last-place finish in 1988 saw them dropped from the league and replaced by 1988 Conference Basketball League (CBL) champions Palmerston North. Canterbury won the championship in 1989 to claim their second league title. They came from fourth place at the finals weekend to claim the championship, knocking over the top-seeded Palmerston North 92–84 in the semi-finals, before defeating Auckland 91–83 in the final.

== Final standings ==
#	Team
	Canterbury
Silver medal	Auckland
3	Palmerston North
4	Wellington
5	Hawke's Bay
6	Waikato
7	New Plymouth
8	Nelson
9	Waitemata
10	North Shore

== Season awards ==
- Most Outstanding Guard: Jamie Dixon (Hawke's Bay)
- Most Outstanding NZ Guard: Byron Vaetoe (Auckland)
- Most Outstanding Forward: Willie Burton (Palmerston North)
- Most Outstanding NZ Forward/Centre: Neil Stephens (Wellington)
- Scoring Champion: Jamie Dixon (Hawke's Bay)
- Rebounding Champion: Willie Burton (Palmerston North)
- Assist Champion: Jamie Dixon (Hawke's Bay)
- Young Player of the Year: John Adie (Auckland)
- Coach of the Year: Curtis Wooten (Hawke's Bay)
- All-Star Five:
  - Tyrone Brown (Palmerston North)
  - Willie Burton (Palmerston North)
  - Jamie Dixon (Hawke's Bay)
  - Neil Stephens (Wellington)
  - Byron Vaetoe (Auckland)
