= 2000 New Zealand NBL season =

- League: New Zealand NBL
- Sport: Basketball
- Games: 16
- Teams: 9

Regular season
- Minor premiers: North Harbour Kings
- Top scorer: Troy Coleman (Hawke's Bay Hawks)

Playoffs
- Champions: Auckland Rebels
- Runners-up: Nelson Giants

New Zealand NBL seasons
- ← 1999 2001 →

The 2000 NBL season was the 19th season of the National Basketball League. Only one change occurred heading into the 2000 season, with the Hawke's Bay Hawks returning to the league after a one-year hiatus to replace the outgoing Taranaki, who withdrew due to financial concerns. Palmerston North were also on the brink of collapse, but they secured a sponsorship deal at the last minute to ensure their participation. The Auckland Rebels won the championship in 2000 to claim their seventh league title.

== Summary ==
=== Regular season standings ===
Pos
Pos	Team	W	L
1	North Harbour Kings	12	4
2	Waikato Warriors	12	4
3	Nelson Giants	12	4
4	Auckland Rebels	10	6
5	Palmerston North Jets	9	7
6	Wellington Saints	9	7
7	Otago Nuggets	4	12
8	Canterbury Rams	2	14
9	Hawke's Bay Hawks	2	14

=== Playoff bracket ===
Semi-finals
1	North Harbour Kings	81
4	Auckland Rebels	92
2	Waikato Warriors	100
3	Nelson Giants	105

Final
Auckland Rebels	95
Nelson Giants	78

== Awards ==
=== Statistics leaders ===
Stats as of the end of the regular season

Category	Player	Team	Stat
Points per game	Troy Coleman	Hawke's Bay Hawks	29.1
Rebounds per game	Tony Rampton	Nelson Giants	14.6
Assists per game	Shaun McCreedy	Hawke's Bay Hawks	5.5
Steals per game	Adrian Boyd	Waikato Warriors	3.9
Blocks per game	Chris Webber	Hawke's Bay Hawks	2.0

=== Regular season ===
- NZ Most Valuable Player: Tony Rampton (Nelson Giants)
- Most Outstanding Guard: Tony Brown (Waikato Warriors)
- Most Outstanding NZ Guard: Tony Brown (Waikato Warriors)
- Most Outstanding Forward: Tony Rampton (Nelson Giants)
- Most Outstanding NZ Forward/Centre: Tony Rampton (Nelson Giants)
- Scoring Champion: Troy Coleman (Hawke's Bay Hawks)
- Rebounding Champion: Tony Rampton (Nelson Giants)
- Assist Champion: Shaun McCreedy (Hawke's Bay Hawks)
- Rookie of the Year: Arthur Trousdell (Canterbury Rams)
- Coach of the Year: Tracy Carpenter (North Harbour Kings)
- All-Star Five:
  - G: Tony Brown (Waikato Warriors)
  - G: Terrence Lewis (Wellington Saints)
  - F: Purnell Perry (North Harbour Kings)
  - F: James Hamilton (Nelson Giants)
  - C: Tony Rampton (Nelson Giants)
