= 2002 New Zealand NBL season =

- League: New Zealand NBL
- Sport: Basketball
- Number of games: 16
- Number of teams: 9

Regular season
- Minor premiers: Nelson Giants
- Top scorer: Ron Grady (Otago Nuggets)

Playoffs
- Champions: Waikato Titans
- Runners-up: Nelson Giants

New Zealand NBL seasons
- ← 2001 2003 →

The 2002 NBL season was the 21st season of the National Basketball League. Two name changes occurred heading into the 2002 season, with Palmerston North now called Manawatu, and North Harbour now called Harbour. The Waikato Titans won the championship in 2002 to claim their second league title. In the final, Titans' forward Dillon Boucher made two free throws with 1.7 seconds to lift Waikato over the Nelson Giants 85–83.

== Summary ==
=== Regular season standings ===
Pos
Pos	Team	W	L
1	Nelson Giants	11	5
2	Waikato Titans	11	5
3	Canterbury Rams	11	5
4	Manawatu Jets	9	7
5	Wellington Saints	7	9
6	Auckland Stars	7	9
7	Harbour Kings	6	10
8	Hawke's Bay Hawks	5	11
9	Otago Nuggets	5	11

=== Playoff bracket ===
Semi-finals
1	Nelson Giants	83
4	Manawatu Jets	64
2	Waikato Titans	91
3	Canterbury Rams	81

Final
Nelson Giants	83
Waikato Titans	85

== Awards ==
=== Statistics leaders ===
Stats as of the end of the regular season

Category	Player	Team	Stat
Points per game	Ron Grady	Otago Nuggets	25.1
Rebounds per game	John Whorton	Canterbury Rams	13.4
Assists per game	Carlo Varricchio	Canterbury Rams	5.3
Steals per game	Prem Krishna	Waikato Titans	2.4
Blocks per game	Kenny Stone	Auckland Stars	2.1

=== Regular season ===
- NZ Most Valuable Player: Terrence Lewis (Canterbury Rams)
- Most Outstanding Guard: Terrence Lewis (Canterbury Rams)
- Most Outstanding NZ Guard: Terrence Lewis (Canterbury Rams)
- Most Outstanding Forward: John Whorton (Canterbury Rams)
- Most Outstanding NZ Forward/Centre: Ed Book (Nelson Giants)
- Scoring Champion: Ron Grady (Otago Nuggets)
- Rebounding Champion: John Whorton (Canterbury Rams)
- Assist Champion: Carlo Varricchio (Canterbury Rams)
- Rookie of the Year: Miles Pearce (Manawatu Jets)
- Coach of the Year: John Watson (Canterbury Rams)
- All-Star Five:
  - G: Mark Dickel (Wellington Saints)
  - G: Terrence Lewis (Canterbury Rams)
  - F: Dillon Boucher (Waikato Titans)
  - F: John Whorton (Canterbury Rams)
  - C: Ed Book (Nelson Giants)
