= Hutt Valley Lakers =

- League: National Basketball League
- Founded: 1990
- Folded: 1996
- History: Hutt Valley Lakers; 1990–1996
- Location: Hutt Valley, Wellington, New Zealand
- Team colours: Yellow, dark blue, white
- Championships: 2 (1991, 1993)

The Hutt Valley Lakers were a New Zealand basketball team based in Hutt Valley, Wellington. The Lakers competed in the National Basketball League (NBL).

== Team history ==
The Hutt Valley Lakers started in the second-tiered Conference Basketball League (CBL). After winning the CBL championship in 1989, the team was promoted to the National Basketball League (NBL) for the 1990 season. In 1991, the Lakers were regular season winners and won the NBL championship with a 103–92 win over the Wellington Saints in the final. In 1993, the Lakers made it back to the NBL final, where they defeated the Canterbury Rams 68–66 to win their second championship. The 1993 final saw Peter Pokai hit the game-winning jump shot to lift the Lakers over the Rams. It was a special triumph for head coach Jeff Green, who was sensationally sacked early in the season, but brought back with seven games to go.

At the end of the 1996 season, both the Lakers and the Saints were struggling to survive. As a result, the two teams amalgamated, with the Lakers merging into the Saints.
