= National Basketball League (New Zealand) =

Premier basketball league in New Zealand

New Zealand National Basketball League (NZNBL)
- Most recent season or competition: 2026 New Zealand NBL season
- Sport: Basketball
- Founded: 1981; 45 years ago
- First season: 1982; 44 years ago
- General manager: Maree Taylor
- No. of teams: 11
- Countries: New Zealand
- Continent: FIBA Oceania (Oceania)
- Most recent champion: Southland Sharks (4th title)
- Most titles: Wellington Saints (13 titles)
- Broadcaster: Sky Sport
- Level on pyramid: 1
- Website: NZNBL.Basketball

The New Zealand National Basketball League (NZNBL) is a men's professional basketball league in New Zealand.

== History ==
The 1980s ushered in a period of exceptional growth and popularity for basketball in New Zealand. Late in 1981, six men's teams – a mixture of club and provincial representative sides – went out alone and created an inaugural national league. It was enough of a success to come under the control of the New Zealand Basketball Federation the following year, when it grew in size and secured a naming sponsor. An allowance of two imported players (invariably Americans with college basketball experience) per team, and the fact that games were played in the evening indoors, helped turn the league into a new family entertainment option. Spectators filled gymnasiums and media coverage reached unprecedented levels. The early 1990s held dwindling fortunes for New Zealand basketball and many teams in the NZNBL, with reduced TV coverage, sponsorships, and crowd numbers. With the success of the Tall Blacks at the 2002 FIBA World Championship and the introduction of the New Zealand Breakers in the Australian NBL in 2003, basketball in New Zealand rose in popularity again.

The number of teams each season has constantly changed since the league's inception, with many promotions and relegations between the first division and second division during the 1980s and 1990s, as well as many withdrawals due to financial reasons. The league began with 8 teams in 1982, then peaked at 13 teams in 1995, before dropping to a low of 7 in 2016. In 2019, the Southern Huskies from Tasmania became the first ever Australian team to join a New Zealand competition. The league returned to 7 teams in 2020 following a revised small-scale format due to the coronavirus pandemic. In 2022, the league was hailed for reaching competitive balance after years of unbalanced competition, with evenly spread talent and resources across the ten teams.

In July 2024, it was revealed that the New Zealand NBL were looking at an expansion team from the Indian National Basketball League. On 30 October 2024, it was announced that the Indian Panthers would join the league in 2025. Turmoil quickly engulfed the Panthers and on 22 May 2025, they withdraw from the league mid-season.

== Current teams ==
| Team | City | Region | Arena | Capacity | Colours | Debut | Head coach |
|---|---|---|---|---|---|---|---|
| Auckland Tuatara | Auckland | Auckland Region | Eventfinda Stadium | 4,179 | | 2019 | (Australia) Cameron Gliddon |
| Canterbury Rams | Christchurch | Canterbury | Parakiore Recreation and Sport Centre | 2,500 | | 1982 | (New Zealand) Quinn Clinton |
| Franklin Bulls | Pukekohe | Auckland Region | Franklin Pool and Leisure Centre | 1,100 | | 2020 | (United States) Dan Ryan |
| Hawke's Bay Hawks | Napier | Hawke's Bay | Pettigrew Green Arena | 2,500 | | 1983 | (Australia) Will Lopez |
| Manawatu Jets | Palmerston North | Manawatū–Whanganui | Central Energy Trust Arena | 2,000 | | 1982 | (New Zealand) Lindsay Tait |
| Nelson Giants | Nelson | Nelson | Trafalgar Centre | 2,460 | | 1982 | (New Zealand) Michael Fitchett |
| Otago Nuggets | Dunedin | Otago | Edgar Centre | 2,880 | | 1990 | (United States) Jeff Sparrow |
| Southland Sharks | Invercargill | Southland | Stadium Southland | 4,019 | | 2010 | (United States) Jonathan Yim |
| Taranaki Airs | New Plymouth | Taranaki | TSB Stadium | 4,560 | | 1985 | Vacant |
| Tauranga Whai | Tauranga | Bay of Plenty | Mercury Baypark | | | 2024 | (New Zealand) Matt Lacey |
| Wellington Saints | Wellington | Wellington Region | TSB Bank Arena | 4,002 | | 1983 | (New Zealand) Aaron Young |

Location of teams

=== Expansion teams ===
| Team | City | Region | Arena | Capacity | Colours | Debut | Head coach |
|---|---|---|---|---|---|---|---|
| Queenstown Yeti | Queenstown | Otago | TBD | | TBD | TBD | TBD |

== Former and defunct teams ==
- Auckland Pirates (2011–2012)
- Auckland Stars (1982–2009)
- Centrals (1982–1985)
- Christchurch Cougars (2009–2010)
- Harbour Heat (1986–2010, 2012)
- Hutt Valley Lakers (1990–1996)
- Indian Panthers (2025)
- Northland Suns (1995–1998)
- Ponsonby (1984–1988)
- Porirua (1982–1983)
- Super City Rangers (1990–1995, 2013–2019)
- Waikato Pistons (1982, 1984–2011, 2013–2014)
- Waitemata Dolphins (1982–1983, 1988–1989)

== League eligibility rules ==
There are two categories of players in the NZNBL:

- Non-Restricted Player – players eligible to play for New Zealand in FIBA competitions
- Restricted Player – a player who is not eligible to play for New Zealand

== Broadcasting details ==
In 2016 and 2017, the NZNBL began to more freely livestream and broadcast their games. In 2020, the league had all 75 games broadcast by Sky Sport, marking the first time in the league's four-decade history that every game would be made available to viewers across the nation. That same year, the league secured a deal to broadcast live in the United States through ESPN.

In 2022, the NZNBL and Sky Sport signed a five-year commercial deal estimated to be worth $7.5 million for the teams.

== Honours ==
=== List of champions ===
| Team | Title(s) | Runners-up | Total | Year(s) won | Year(s) lost |
|---|---|---|---|---|---|
| Wellington Saints | 13 | 9 | 22 | 1984, 1985, 1987, 1988, 2003, 2010, 2011, 2014, 2016, 2017, 2019, 2021, 2025 | 1983, 1986, 1991, 2001, 2008, 2012, 2015, 2018, 2026 |
| Auckland Stars | 9 | 4 | 13 | 1982, 1983, 1995, 1996, 1997, 1999, 2000, 2004, 2005 | 1984, 1985, 1989, 2006 |
| Canterbury Rams | 6 | 4 | 10 | 1986, 1989, 1990, 1992, 2023, 2024 | 1987, 1993, 1994, 1999 |
| Waikato Pistons | 4 | 2 | 6 | 2001, 2002, 2008, 2009 | 2003, 2010 |
| Southland Sharks | 4 | 2 | 6 | 2013, 2015, 2018, 2026 | 2017, 2025 |
| Nelson Giants | 3 | 8 | 11 | 1994, 1998, 2007 | 1990, 1996, 1997, 2000, 2002, 2004, 2009, 2013 |
| Hutt Valley Lakers | 2 | 0 | 2 | 1991, 1993 | |
| Otago Nuggets | 2 | 0 | 2 | 2020, 2022 | |
| Hawke's Bay Hawks | 1 | 7 | 8 | 2006 | 1995, 2005, 2007, 2011, 2014, 2019, 2021 |
| Auckland Pirates | 1 | 0 | 1 | 2012 | |
| Auckland Tuatara | 0 | 3 | 3 | | 2022, 2023, 2024 |
| Harbour Heat | 0 | 2 | 2 | | 1988, 1998 |
| Manawatu Jets | 0 | 2 | 2 | | 1992, 2020 |
| Waitemata Dolphins | 0 | 1 | 1 | | 1982 |
| Super City Rangers | 0 | 1 | 1 | | 2016 |

=== Awards ===
Current

- Most Valuable Player
- Finals MVP
- Most Outstanding Guard
- Most Outstanding NZ Guard
- Most Outstanding Forward
- Most Outstanding NZ Forward/Centre
- Scoring Champion
- Rebounding Champion
- Assist Champion
- Most Improved Player
- Defensive Player of the Year
- Youth Player of the Year
- Coach of the Year
- All-Star Five
- Best Team Free Throws

Past

- NZ Most Valuable Player

== See also ==
- Conference Basketball League
- List of National Basketball League (New Zealand) awards
- National Basketball League (Australia)
- New Zealand men's national basketball team
- Tauihi Basketball Aotearoa
