= Waikato Pistons =

New Zealand basketball team

- League: National Basketball League
- Founded: 1982
- Folded: November 2014
- History: Hamilton; 1982; 1984–1986; Waikato Warriors; 1987–2000; Waikato Titans; 2001–2005; Waikato Pistons; 2006–2011; 2013–2014
- Team colors: Black, yellow, red, white
- Championships: 4 (2001, 2002, 2008, 2009)

The Waikato Pistons were a basketball team based in Hamilton, Waikato, New Zealand. The team competed in the National Basketball League (NBL) under different names between 1982 and 2014, with absent years in 1983 and 2012.

== Team history ==
The Waikato Pistons, then known as Hamilton, were a foundation member of the National Basketball League (NBL) in 1982. After finishing seventh in the eight-team competition, the team was relegated to the second-tiered Conference Basketball League (CBL) in 1983. After finishing as CBL Northern champions in 1983, Hamilton was promoted back into the NBL in 1984. In 1987, the team was renamed Waikato. The team was known as the Waikato Warriors in 2000.

In 2001, the Waikato Titans claimed the team's first minor premiership with a first-place finish and a 15–1 record. Behind the likes of Clifton Bush and Pero Cameron, the Titans defeated the Auckland Stars 93–88 in the semi-finals before winning their maiden NBL championship with a 112–97 win over the Wellington Saints in the final.

In 2002, the Titans finished second in the regular season with an 11–5 record. Behind the likes of Cameron, Dillon Boucher and Brendon Pongia, the Titans defeated the Canterbury Rams 91–81 in the semi-finals before claiming back-to-back championships with an 85–83 win over the Nelson Giants in the final.

In 2003, the Titans claimed their second minor premiership in three years with a first-place finish and a 16–2 record. Behind the likes of Cameron and Boucher, the Titans reached their third straight final with a 98–77 win over the Auckland Stars in the semi-finals. In the final, they were defeated 97–88 in overtime by the Saints.

In 2008, the Waikato Pistons finished second in the regular season with a 13–5 record. Behind the likes of Cameron, Brian Wethers and Jason Crowe, the Pistons defeated the Auckland Stars 86–80 in the semi-finals before winning their third NBL championship with a 2–0 series win over the Wellington Saints in the finals. In game one, they won 95–78, and in game two, they won 84–79.

In 2009, the Pistons won the minor premiership with a first-place finish and a 14–2 record. Behind the likes of Cameron, Michael Fitchett, Thomas Abercrombie, Justin Bailey and Adam Ballinger, the Pistons defeated the Christchurch Cougars 96–89 in the semi-finals before winning their fourth NBL championship with a 2–0 series win over the Nelson Giants in the finals. In game one, they won 81–69, and in game two, they won 94–84.

In 2010, the Pistons finished second in the regular season with a 13–5 record. Behind the likes of Abercrombie, Hayden Allen, Alex Pledger and Rashad Tucker, the Pistons reached their third straight finals series with a 74–62 win over the Nelson Giants in the semi-finals. In the finals, they were defeated 2–1 by the Saints, winning 80–74 in game one, before losing 98–69 in game two and 82–79 in game three.

In October 2011, the Pistons were withdrawn from the NBL after the Waikato Basketball Council (WBC) decided to make community basketball its top priority. In November 2012, the WBC were granted a three-year NBL licence and thus re-entered the Pistons into the NBL for the 2013 season. However, two years later, in November 2014, the Pistons were withdrawn by the WBC once again after they felt their resources were better placed on less expensive development operations.

== CBL team ==
Between 2005 and 2007, Waikato's second division CBL team, the Waikato Titans, won three straight championships under coach Jeff Green. The Titans also made the 2008 CBL final, where they lost to the Wellington Saints.
