= Auckland Stars =

- League: National Basketball League
- Founded: 1982
- Folded: February 2010
- History: Auckland; 1982–1989; Auckland Cannons; 1990–1991; Auckland Stars; 1992–1996; Auckland Rebels; 1997–2000; Auckland Stars; 2001–2009
- Arena: ASB Stadium
- Location: Auckland, New Zealand
- Team colours: Blue & white
- Ownership: Tab Baldwin
- Championships: 9 (1982, 1983, 1995, 1996, 1997, 1999, 2000, 2004, 2005)
- Website: AucklandStars.co.nz

The Auckland Stars were a New Zealand basketball team based in Auckland. The Stars competed in the National Basketball League (NBL) and played their home games at ASB Stadium.

== Team history ==
The Auckland Stars, then known as Auckland Metro, were a foundation member of the National Basketball League (NBL) in 1982. They were champions of the league in the first two seasons, before finishing as runners-up to the Wellington Saints in both 1984 and 1985. They returned to the NBL final in 1989, where they lost to the Canterbury Rams.

Between 1995 and 2006, Auckland reached the championship round eight times. They won three straight championships between 1995 and 1997, with four more titles coming in 1999, 2000, 2004 and 2005. Despite their success, the Stars struggled to capture a sizeable fanbase.

In February 2010, the team was suspended from competing in the 2010 NBL season after falling into financial strife and failing to pay some players and coaching staff.
