= Canterbury Rams =

Men's basketball team in Christchurch, New Zealand

- League: NZNBL
- Founded: 1982
- History: Canterbury Rams; 1982–2008; 2014–present
- Arena: Parakiore Recreation and Sport Centre
- Location: Christchurch, Canterbury, New Zealand
- Team colours: Black & red
- Main sponsor: Wheeler Motor Company
- General manager: Caleb Harrison
- Head coach: Quinn Clinton
- Ownership: Andrew and Nicky Harrison
- Championships: 6 (1986, 1989, 1990, 1992, 2023, 2024)
- Website: canterburyrams.basketball/
| Home | Away |

The Canterbury Rams are a New Zealand professional men's basketball team based in Christchurch. The Rams compete in the National Basketball League (NBL) and play their home games at Parakiore Recreation and Sport Centre. For sponsorship reasons, they are known as The Wheeler Motor Canterbury Rams.

== Team history ==
The Canterbury Rams were a foundation member of the National Basketball League (NBL) in 1982. Between 1986 and 1994, the Rams made the NBL final seven times, winning championships in 1986, 1989, 1990 and 1992. Import players Kenny Perkins, Clyde Huntley, Eddie Anderson and Angelo Hill were central to the success of the Rams, as was the New Zealand core of John "Dutchie" Rademakers, Gilbert Gordon, Andy Bennett, Graham Timms, John Hill, Ian Webb, Glen Denham and Ralph Lattimore. The architects of this success were coaches Garry Pettis, who led the team from 1986 to 1988, and Keith Mair, who took over in 1989. In 1999, the Rams made their eighth NBL final under coach Bert Knops, where they lost to the Auckland Rebels.

In 2000, Dr John Watson took over the Rams organisation from the cash-strapped Canterbury Basketball Association (CBA). His takeover of the team created some deep divisions within the basketball community. In 2006, the CBA signed a three-year management contract with Watson. In December 2008, after the CBA advised Watson that they would not be completing the third year of the contract, the Rams withdrew from the NBL, with the Christchurch Cougars taking their place in the 2009 NBL season. The Cougars lasted just two seasons after withdrawing on the eve of the 2011 season due to the Christchurch earthquake.

In November 2013, the Canterbury Rams were granted re-entry into NBL under the leadership of Christchurch businessman Andrew Harrison, making their return during the 2014 NBL season.

In 2016, the Rams were regular season winners for the first time since 1993 and made their first playoff appearance since 2002, where they lost in the semi-final to the Super City Rangers.

In 2023, the Rams reached their first NBL final since 1999 behind the likes of Troy Baxter Jr., Tevin Brown and Corey Webster. They won their fifth championship and first since 1992 with a 93–82 win over the Auckland Tuatara.

In 2024, the Rams returned to the NBL final, where they once again defeated the Auckland Tuatara 102–87 behind Australian centre Lachlan Olbrich, the league MVP and grand final MVP. Olbrich contributed 29 points, 18 rebounds, and six assists in the final, while US forward KJ Buffen added 21 points on 8-9 shooting.

In February 2026, it was announced that the Rams would relocate from Cowles Stadium to the brand-new Parakiore Recreation and Sport Centre.

== Honour roll ==
| NBL Championships: | 6 (1986, 1989, 1990, 1992, 2023, 2024) |
| NBL Playoff appearances: | 20 (1982, 1984, 1985, 1986, 1987, 1989, 1990, 1992, 1993, 1994, 1998, 1999, 2002, 2016, 2017, 2019, 2023, 2024, 2025, 2026) |
| NBL Grand Final appearances: | 10 (1986, 1987, 1989, 1990, 1992, 1993, 1994, 1999, 2023, 2024) |
| Most Valuable Player: | McKenzie Moore (2016), Lachlan Olbrich (2024) |
| Kiwi MVP: | John Rademakers (1984), Terrence Lewis (2002), Marcel Jones (2016) |
| All-Star Five: | Clyde Huntley (1983, 1984, 1986, 1987), Eddie Anderson (1991), Terrence Lewis (2002), John Whorton (2002), McKenzie Moore (2016), Marcel Jones (2016, 2017), Winston Shepard (2018), Cameron Gliddon (2019), Tevin Brown (2023), Lachlan Olbrich (2024), Taylor Britt (2024, 2026), Sean Macdonald (2025), Tamenang Choh (2026) |
| Most Outstanding Guard: | Clyde Huntley (1986), Eddie Anderson (1991), Terrence Lewis (2002), McKenzie Moore (2016), Cameron Gliddon (2019) |
| Most Outstanding Kiwi Guard: | John Rademakers (1986), Chris Tupu (1994), Terrence Lewis (2002), Taylor Britt (2024, 2026) |
| Most Outstanding Forward: | John Whorton (2002), Marcel Jones (2016), Lachlan Olbrich (2024) |
| Most Outstanding Kiwi Forward/Centre: | Glen Denham (1990), Marcel Jones (2016, 2017) |
| Scoring Champion: | John Whorton (2003), Dennis Trammell (2006) |
| Rebounding Champion: | John Whorton (2002, 2003) |
| Assist Champion: | Clyde Huntley (1984), Scott Stewart (1996), Carlo Varicchio (2002), McKenzie Moore (2016) |
| Rookie of the Year: | Arthur Trousdell (2000), Richie Edwards (2014), Max Darling (2018) |
| Youth Player of the Year: | Walter Brown (2023), Lachlan Olbrich (2024), Jake Holmes (2026) |
| Coach of the Year: | John Watson (2002), Mick Downer (2019), Judd Flavell (2024), Quinn Clinton (2026) |
| Most Improved Player of the Year: | Taylor Britt (2024), Walter Brown (2026) |

== Players ==
=== Current roster ===
Note: Flags indicate national team eligibility at FIBA-sanctioned events. Players may hold other non-FIBA nationalities not displayed.

Canterbury Rams roster
Players
Coaches

| Pos. | No. | Nat. | Name | Ht. |
|---|---|---|---|---|
| G | 1 | (New Zealand) | Cate, Tawhiri | 1.86 m (6 ft 1 in) |
| G | 2 | (New Zealand) | Cooper, Brody | 1.92 m (6 ft 4 in) |
| F | 3 | (New Zealand) | Sula, Marco | 1.95 m (6 ft 5 in) |
| F | 4 | (New Zealand) | Martin, Mana | 1.92 m (6 ft 4 in) |
| G | 5 | (New Zealand) | Britt, Taylor (C) | 1.88 m (6 ft 2 in) |
| F | 7 | (New Zealand) | Brown, Walter | 1.94 m (6 ft 4 in) |
| G | 8 | (New Zealand) | Dallow, Gus | 1.83 m (6 ft 0 in) |
| F | 10 | (New Zealand) | Cate, Ihaka | 1.96 m (6 ft 5 in) |
| F | 13 | (New Zealand) | Worthington, Tony | 2.01 m (6 ft 7 in) |
| G | 15 | (New Zealand) | Christof, Christopher | 1.83 m (6 ft 0 in) |
| F | 16 | (New Zealand) | Holmes, Jake | 2.05 m (6 ft 9 in) |
| C | 21 | (New Zealand) | Andrew, Jack | 2.08 m (6 ft 10 in) |
| F | 24 | (United States) | Rougeau, René (I) | 1.98 m (6 ft 6 in) |
| F | 25 | (Cameroon) | Choh, Tamenang (I) | 1.96 m (6 ft 5 in) |
| G | 30 | (New Zealand) | Newton, Milan | 1.83 m (6 ft 0 in) |
| G | 32 | (New Zealand) | Marsh, Ben |
| F | 33 | (United States) | Withers, Todd (I) | 2.01 m (6 ft 7 in) |
| F | | (New Zealand) | Patten, Will | 2.11 m (6 ft 11 in) |
| F | | (New Zealand) | Read, Tommy | 1.98 m (6 ft 6 in) |

Head coach

- (New Zealand) Quinn Clinton

Assistant coach(es)

- (New Zealand) Ben Sheat
- (New Zealand) Lucas Schnuriger

Legend

- (C) Team captain
- (DP) Development player
- (I) Import player
- Injured

- Roster
Updated: 1 July 2026

=== Notable past players ===
- (United States) / (New Zealand) Clifton Bush
- (United States) Glen Dandridge
- (New Zealand) Glen Denham
- (United States) / (New Zealand) Richie Edwards
- (United States) Mickell Gladness
- (United States) / (New Zealand) Marcel Jones
- (United States) Jeremy Kendle
- (New Zealand) Jeremy Kench
- (United States) / (New Zealand) Terrence Lewis
- (Australia) Damian Matacz
- (United States) McKenzie Moore
- (United States) Matthew Rogers
- (New Zealand) Ethan Rusbatch
- (United States) Deshon Taylor
- (United States) Jermaine Taylor
- (New Zealand) Reuben Te Rangi
- (United States) Dennis Trammell
- (New Zealand) / (United Kingdom) Arthur Trousdell
- (United States) M. J. Walker
- (Fiji) Marques Whippy

== Coaches ==
=== Head coaches ===
- (New Zealand) Murray McKay (1982–1983)
- (New Zealand) Darrell Todd (1984–1985)
- (New Zealand) Garry Pettis (1986–1988)
- (New Zealand) Keith Mair (1989–1995)
- (New Zealand) Bert Knops (1996–1999)
- (New Zealand) Matt Ruscoe (2000–2001)
- (United States) John Watson (2002–2004)
- (New Zealand) Pete McAllister (2004–2005)
- (United States) Chris Sparks (2006–2007)
- (New Zealand) Bert Knops (2008)
- (New Zealand) Dave Harrison (2014)
- (New Zealand) Mark Dickel (2015–2018)
- (Australia) Mick Downer (2019–2021)
- (New Zealand) Judd Flavell (2022–2024)
- (New Zealand) Quinn Clinton (2025–present)

Source: canterburyrams.basketball
