= Nelson Giants =

New Zealand basketball team based in Nelson

- League: NZNBL
- Founded: 1982
- History: Nelson Giants; 1982–present
- Arena: Trafalgar Centre
- Location: Nelson, New Zealand
- Team colours: Blue & white
- Main sponsor: Nelson Building Society
- General manager: Michael Fitchett
- Head coach: Michael Fitchett
- Ownership: Basketball Development Nelson Trust
- Championships: 3 (1994, 1998, 2007)
- Retired numbers: 3 (4, 13, 14)
- Website: nelsongiants.basketball
Home	Away

The Nelson Giants are a New Zealand professional men's basketball team based in Nelson. The Giants compete in the National Basketball League (NBL) and play their home games at the Trafalgar Centre. For sponsorship reasons, they are known as the NBS Nelson Giants. The Giants are the only remaining original team from the league's inaugural season, as all other teams have spent at least one year out of the league, for various reasons.

== Team history ==
The Nelson Giants were a foundation member of the National Basketball League (NBL) in 1982. The Giants made their first NBL final in 1990, where they lost to the Canterbury Rams in what was the NBL's first all-South Island final. In 1994, the Giants won their maiden championship with a 67–66 win over the Rams in the final. In 1996 and 1997, the Giants lost back-to-back championship series, before winning their second NBL championship in 1998 with an 81–73 win over the North Harbour Kings in the final. In 2000, 2002, and 2004, the Giants were runners-up. In 2007, the Giants won their third championship with a 2–0 series win over the Hawke's Bay Hawks. In 2009 and 2013, the Giants were runners-up.

The Trafalgar Centre was Nelson's home stadium from 1982 until being closed because of its earthquake risk in December 2013. As a result, the Giants played out of Saxton Stadium in 2014 and 2015. The team returned to the Trafalgar Centre in 2016 after the venue completed earthquake strengthening.

== Current roster ==
Note: Flags indicate national team eligibility at FIBA-sanctioned events. Players may hold other non-FIBA nationalities not displayed.

Nelson Giants roster
Players
Coaches

Pos.	No.	Nat.	Name	Ht.
G	0	(New Zealand)	McNaught, Alex	1.85 m (6 ft 1 in)
G	1	(New Zealand)	Inwood, Elijah	1.88 m (6 ft 2 in)
G	2	(New Zealand)	Adams, Cooper	1.90 m (6 ft 3 in)
G	3	(United States)	Gatling, Shane (I)	1.88 m (6 ft 2 in)
G	5	(New Zealand)	Perrott-Hunt, Kruz	1.91 m (6 ft 3 in)
G	7	(New Zealand)	Varricchio, Rico	1.80 m (5 ft 11 in)
G	8	(New Zealand)	Materoa, Brodie	1.93 m (6 ft 4 in)
F	10	(New Zealand)	Dempster, Sam (C)	1.94 m (6 ft 4 in)
G/F	11	(Samoa)	Nickel, Josh	1.90 m (6 ft 3 in)
C	12	(New Zealand)	Rampton, Zach	2.11 m (6 ft 11 in)
F	18	(New Zealand)	Smith-Milner, Tohi	2.05 m (6 ft 9 in)
F/C	25	(New Zealand)	Sinclair, Jerome	2.01 m (6 ft 7 in)
G	35	(New Zealand)	Matthews, James	1.84 m (6 ft 0 in)
F	43	(United States)	Saylor, Daniel (I)	2.11 m (6 ft 11 in)
F	67	(New Zealand)	Judd, Liam	1.96 m (6 ft 5 in)
F	77	(Finland)	Luukkonen, Eemi (I)	2.03 m (6 ft 8 in)

Head coach

- (New Zealand) Michael Fitchett

Assistant coach(es)

- (New Zealand) Tom Gargiulo
- (New Zealand) Phill Jones

Legend

- (C) Team captain
- (DP) Development player
- (I) Import player
- Injured

- Roster
Updated: 27 June 2026

== Notable players ==
Note: Flags indicate national team eligibility at FIBA-sanctioned events. Players may hold other non-FIBA nationalities not displayed.

Criteria

To appear in this section a player must have either:

- Set a club record or won an individual award while at the club
- Played at least one official international match for their national team at any time
- Played at least one official NBA match at any time.

- (Serbia) / (New Zealand) Nenad Vučinić
- (New Zealand) Phill Jones
- (New Zealand) Mika Vukona
- (United States) Josh Pace
- (United States) Rod Grizzard
- (United States) Hunter Hale
- (New Zealand) Dion Prewster
- (New Zealand) Finn Delany
- (New Zealand) Tony Rampton

=== Retired numbers ===
Nelson Giants Retired Numbers
No	Nat.	Player	Position	Tenure	Ceremony date
4	(Serbia) (New Zealand)	Nenad Vučinić	SF	1989–2007	10 June 2017
13	(New Zealand)	Phill Jones	SG	1993–2017	10 June 2017
14	(New Zealand)	Mika Vukona	PF	2000–2020	21 June 2023
