= New Zealand NBL All-Star Five =

Annual National Basketball League honour

The National Basketball League All-Star Five is an annual National Basketball League (NBL) honour bestowed on the five best players in the league following every NBL season. The five-player team has been selected in every season of the league's existence, dating back to its inaugural season in 1982.

== Winners ==
=== 1982 to 1993 ===
Season	All-Star Five		Ref
Season	Players	Teams	Ref
1982	Brian Brumit	Waitemata Dolphins	
1982	Stan Hill	Auckland	
1982	James Lofton	Porirua	
1982	Jack Maere	Auckland	
1982	Brent Wright	Nelson Giants	
1983	Ben Anthony	Auckland	
1983	Thomas DeMarcus	Napier Sunhawks	
1983	Stan Hill (2)	Auckland	
1983	Clyde Huntley	Canterbury Rams	
1983	Kenny McFadden	Wellington Saints	
1984	Ben Anthony (2)	Auckland	
1984	Clyde Huntley (2)	Canterbury Rams	
1984	Zack Jones	Hamilton	
1984	Kenny McFadden (2)	Wellington Saints	
1984	Jacque Tuz	Nelson Giants	
1985	Tyrone Brown	Palmerston North Jets	
1985	Willie Burton	Palmerston North Jets	
1985	Stan Hill (3)	Auckland	
1985	Ronnie Joyner	Ponsonby	
1985	Kenny McFadden (3)	Wellington Saints	
1986	Clyde Huntley (3)	Canterbury Rams	
1986	Ollie Johnson	Wellington Saints	
1986	Ronnie Joyner (2)	Ponsonby	
1986	Frank Smith	Nelson Giants	
1986	Tony Webster	North Shore	
1987	Willie Burton (2)	Hawke's Bay Hawks	
1987	Keith Colbert	Auckland	
1987	Clyde Huntley (4)	Canterbury Rams	
1987	Frank Smith (2)	Nelson Giants	
1987	Tony Webster (2)	North Shore	
1988	Kerry Boagni	Wellington Saints	
1988	Willie Burton (3)	Hawke's Bay Hawks	
1988	Carl Golston	Waikato Warriors	
1988	Kenny McFadden (4)	Wellington Saints	
1988	John Welch	Waitemata Dolphins	
1989	Tyrone Brown (2)	Palmerston North Jets	
1989	Willie Burton (4)	Palmerston North Jets	
1989	Jamie Dixon	Hawke's Bay Hawks	
1989	Neil Stephens	Wellington Saints	
1989	Byron Vaetoe	Auckland	
1990	Kerry Boagni (2)	Wellington Saints	
1990	Willie Burton (5)	Palmerston North Jets	
1990	Jamie Dixon (2)	Hawke's Bay Hawks	
1990	Kenny Stone	Nelson Giants	
1990	Nenad Vučinić	Nelson Giants	
1991	Eddie Anderson	Canterbury Rams	
1991	Kerry Boagni (3)	Wellington Saints	
1991	Tony Brown	Hutt Valley Lakers	
1991	Willie Burton (6)	New Plymouth Bulls	
1991	Darryl Johnson	Hutt Valley Lakers	
1992	Tony Brown (2)	Hutt Valley Lakers	
1992	Tyrone Brown (3)	New Plymouth Bulls	
1992	Willie Burton (7)	New Plymouth Bears	
1992	DeWayne McCray	Palmerston North Jets	
1992	Donnell Thomas	Nelson Giants	
1993	Kerry Boagni (4)	Hawke's Bay Hawks	
1993	Willie Burton (8)	New Plymouth Bears	
1993	Terry Giles	Hawke's Bay Hawks	
1993	Terrence Lewis	Wellington Saints	
1993	Neil Stephens (2)	Auckland Stars	

=== 1994 to present ===
Season	All-Star Five		Ref
Season	Players	Teams	Ref
1994	G: Leonard King	Otago Nuggets	
1994	G: Tony Brown (3)	Palmerston North Jets	
1994	F: Darryl Johnson (2)	Nelson Giants	
1994	F: DeWayne McCray (2)	Hutt Valley Lakers	
1994	C: Pero Cameron	Auckland Stars	
1995	G: Leonard King (2)	Otago Nuggets	
1995	G: Dylan Rigdon	Palmerston North Jets	
1995	F: Darryl Johnson (3)	Hawke's Bay Hawks	
1995	F: Kenny Stone	Auckland Stars	
1995	C: Pero Cameron (2)	Auckland Stars	
1996	G: Tony Bennett	North Harbour Vikings	
1996	G: Phill Jones	Nelson Giants	
1996	F: Darryl Johnson (4)	Hutt Valley Lakers	
1996	F: Pero Cameron (3)	Auckland Stars	
1996	C: Ed Book	Palmerston North Jets	
1997	G: Tony Bennett (2)	North Harbour Vikings	
1997	G: Adrian Boyd	Auckland Rebels	
1997	F: Jim DeGraffenreid	Waikato Warriors	
1997	F: Kenny Stone (2)	Auckland Rebels	
1997	C: Pero Cameron (4)	Auckland Rebels	
1998	G: Joe Wyatt	Nelson Giants	
1998	G: Phill Jones (2)	Nelson Giants	
1998	F: Darryl Johnson (5)	Wellington Saints	
1998	F: DeWayne McCray (3)	Wellington Saints	
1998	C: Pero Cameron (5)	Auckland Rebels	
1999	G: Terrence Lewis (2)	Wellington Saints	
1999	G: Phill Jones (3)	Otago Nuggets	
1999	F: Scott Benson	Auckland Rebels	
1999	F: Pero Cameron (6)	Auckland Rebels	
1999	C: Chris Ensminger	North Harbour Kings	
2000	G: Tony Brown (4)	Waikato Warriors	
2000	G: Terrence Lewis (3)	Wellington Saints	
2000	F: Purnell Perry	North Harbour Kings	
2000	F: James Hamilton	Nelson Giants	
2000	C: Tony Rampton	Nelson Giants	
2001	G: Hayden Allen	Otago Nuggets	
2001	G: Phill Jones (4)	Nelson Giants	
2001	F: Clifton Bush	Waikato Titans	
2001	F: Brian Gomes	North Harbour Kings	
2001	C: Pero Cameron (7)	Waikato Titans	
2002	G: Mark Dickel	Wellington Saints	
2002	G: Terrence Lewis (4)	Canterbury Rams	
2002	F: Dillon Boucher	Waikato Titans	
2002	F: John Whorton	Canterbury Rams	
2002	C: Ed Book (2)	Nelson Giants	
2003	G: Paul Henare	Hawke's Bay Hawks	
2003	G: Lindsay Tait	Auckland Stars	
2003	F: Dillon Boucher (2)	Waikato Titans	
2003	F: Link Abrams	Taranaki Mountainairs	
2003	C: David Cooper	Manawatu Jets	
2004	G: Willie Banks	Taranaki Mountainairs	
2004	G: Lindsay Tait (2)	Auckland Stars	
2004	F: Adrian Majstrovich	Hawke's Bay Hawks	
2004	F: Ben Knight	Wellington Saints	
2004	C: Geordie Cullen	Waikato Titans	
2005	G: Paul Henare (2)	Hawke's Bay Hawks	
2005	G: Lindsay Tait (3)	Auckland Stars	
2005	F: Greg Lewis	Waikato Titans	
2005	F: Jacob Holmes	Nelson Giants	
2005	C: Casey Frank	Auckland Stars	
2006	G: Lindsay Tait (4)	Auckland Stars	
2006	G: Paora Winitana	Hawke's Bay Hawks	
2006	F: Josh Pace	Nelson Giants	
2006	F: Casey Frank (2)	Auckland Stars	
2006	C: Nick Horvath	Wellington Saints	
2007	G: Lindsay Tait (5)	Auckland Stars	
2007	G: Josh Pace (2)	Nelson Giants	
2007	F: Dillon Boucher (3)	Auckland Stars	
2007	F: Oscar Forman	Harbour Heat	
2007	C: Link Abrams	Taranaki Mountainairs	
2008	G: Jason Crowe	Waikato Pistons	
2008	G: Brian Wethers	Waikato Pistons	
2008	F: Ernest Scott	Wellington Saints	
2008	F: Casey Frank (3)	Auckland Stars	
2008	C: Nick Horvath (2)	Wellington Saints	
2009	G: Mike Efevberha	Wellington Saints	
2009	G: Phill Jones (5)	Nelson Giants	
2009	F: Thomas Abercrombie	Waikato Pistons	
2009	F: Adam Ballinger	Waikato Pistons	
2009	C: Tim Behrendorff	Christchurch Cougars	
2010	G: Lindsay Tait (6)	Wellington Saints	
2010	G: Eric Devendorf	Wellington Saints	
2010	F: René Rougeau	Southland Sharks	
2010	F: Thomas Abercrombie (2)	Waikato Pistons	
2010	C: Mika Vukona	Nelson Giants	
2011	G: Lindsay Tait (7)	Wellington Saints	
2011	G: Jason Crowe (2)	Waikato Pistons	
2011	F: Thomas Abercrombie (3)	Waikato Pistons	
2011	F: Mika Vukona (2)	Nelson Giants	
2011	C: Alex Pledger	Waikato Pistons	
2012	G: Lindsay Tait (8)	Auckland Pirates	
2012	G: Paora Winitana (2)	Hawke's Bay Hawks	
2012	F: Josh Pace (3)	Manawatu Jets	
2012	F: Antoine Tisby	Otago Nuggets	
2012	C: Nick Horvath (3)	Manawatu Jets	
2013	G: Lindsay Tait (9)	Wellington Saints	
2013	G: Josh Pace (4)	Nelson Giants	
2013	F: B. J. Anthony	Otago Nuggets	
2013	F: Brian Conklin	Southland Sharks	
2013	C: Nick Horvath (4)	Manawatu Jets	
2014	G: Jason Cadee	Super City Rangers	
2014	G: Corey Webster	Wellington Saints	
2014	F: Dustin Scott	Hawke's Bay Hawks	
2014	F: Suleiman Braimoh	Taranaki Mountainairs	
2014	C: Jamal Boykin	Nelson Giants	
2015	G: McKenzie Moore	Nelson Giants	
2015	G: Torrey Craig	Wellington Saints	
2015	F: Todd Blanchfield	Southland Sharks	
2015	F: Tai Wesley	Southland Sharks	
2015	C: Aaron Fuller	Taranaki Mountainairs	
2016	G: McKenzie Moore (2)	Canterbury Rams	
2016	G: Raymond Cowels	Nelson Giants	
2016	F: Torrey Craig (2)	Wellington Saints	
2016	F: Marcel Jones	Canterbury Rams	
2016	C: Alex Pledger (2)	Southland Sharks	
2017	G: Shea Ili	Wellington Saints	
2017	G: Corey Webster (2)	Wellington Saints	
2017	F: Mitch McCarron	Super City Rangers	
2017	F: Marcel Jones (2)	Canterbury Rams	
2017	C: Tai Wesley (2)	Wellington Saints	
2018	G: Shea Ili (2)	Wellington Saints	
2018	G: Jarrad Weeks	Southland Sharks	
2018	F: Winston Shepard	Canterbury Rams	
2018	F: Finn Delany	Nelson Giants	
2018	C: Angus Brandt	Hawke's Bay Hawks	
2019	G: Shea Ili (3)	Wellington Saints	
2019	G: Cameron Gliddon	Canterbury Rams	
2019	F: E. J. Singler	Hawke's Bay Hawks	
2019	F: Nick Kay	Wellington Saints	
2019	C: Brandon Bowman	Hawke's Bay Hawks	
2020	G: Derone Raukawa	Taranaki Mountainairs	
2020	G: Izayah Mauriohooho-Le'afa	Auckland Huskies	
2020	F: Jordan Ngatai	Otago Nuggets	
2020	F: Marcel Jones (3)	Taranaki Mountainairs	
2020	C: Tom Vodanovich	Manawatu Jets	
2021	G: Dion Prewster	Wellington Saints	
2021	G: Hunter Hale	Nelson Giants	
2021	F: Dom Kelman-Poto	Southland Sharks	
2021	F: Taane Samuel	Wellington Saints	
2021	C: Sam Timmins	Otago Nuggets	
2022	G: Jarrod West	Nelson Giants	
2022	G: Anthony Hilliard	Taranaki Airs	
2022	F: Javonte Douglas	Taranaki Airs	
2022	F: Xavier Cooks	Wellington Saints	
2022	C: Chris Johnson	Auckland Tuatara	
2023	G: Jeremy Kendle	Southland Sharks	
2023	G: Jarrad Weeks (2)	Auckland Tuatara	
2023	F: Tevin Brown	Canterbury Rams	
2023	F: Todd Withers	Otago Nuggets	
2023	C: Robert Loe	Auckland Tuatara	
2024	G: Taylor Britt	Canterbury Rams	
2024	G: Isaiah Moore	Hawke's Bay Hawks	
2024	F: Luther Muhammad	Franklin Bulls	
2024	F: Robert Loe (2)	Auckland Tuatara	
2024	C: Lachlan Olbrich	Canterbury Rams	
2025	G: Nick Marshall	Wellington Saints	
2025	G: Sean Macdonald	Canterbury Rams	
2025	F: Carlin Davison	Taranaki Airs	
2025	F: Jeremy Combs	Nelson Giants	
2025	C: Josiah Allick	Southland Sharks	
2026	G: Taylor Britt (2)	Canterbury Rams	
2026	G: Elijah Pepper	Wellington Saints	
2026	F: Tamenang Choh	Canterbury Rams	
2026	F: Reuben Te Rangi	Tauranga Whai	
2026	C: Sam Timmins (2)	Southland Sharks	

== See also ==
- List of National Basketball League (New Zealand) awards
