= New Zealand NBL Assist Champion =

Basketball League

The National Basketball League Assist Champion is an annual National Basketball League (NBL) award given since the 1984 New Zealand NBL season to the player with the highest assists per game average of the regular season. The winner receives the Dave Taylor Trophy.

== Winners ==
Denotes players that also led the league in scoring that season.

Year	Player	Nationality	Team	APG
1984	Clyde Huntley	United States	Canterbury Rams	
1985	Kenny McFadden	United States	Wellington Saints	
1986	Tony Webster	United States	North Shore	
1987	Kenny McFadden (2)	United States	Wellington Saints	
1988	Carl Golston	United States	Waikato Warriors	
1989	Jamie Dixon	United States	Hawke's Bay Hawks	
1990	Chris Harper	United States	New Plymouth Bulls	
1991	Kenny McFadden (3)	United States	Wellington Saints	
1992	Tyrone Brown	United States	New Plymouth Bears	
1993	Terry Giles	United States	Hawke's Bay Hawks	
1994	Wayman Strickland	United States	North Harbour Vikings	
1995	Tony Brown	United States	Hutt Valley Lakers	
1996	Scott Stewart	United States	Canterbury Rams	
1997	Mike Foster	United States	Northland Suns	7.8
1998	Mark Dickel	New Zealand	Wellington Saints	8.7
1999	Willie Burton	New Zealand	Palmerston North Jets	5.6
2000	Shaun McCreedy	New Zealand	Hawke's Bay Hawks	5.5
2001	Paul Henare	New Zealand	Auckland Stars	5.1
2002	Carlo Varricchio	New Zealand	Canterbury Rams	5.3
2003	George Le'afa	New Zealand	Wellington Saints	6.2
2004	Paul Henare (2)	New Zealand	Hawke's Bay Hawks	5.2
2005	Paul Henare (3)	New Zealand	Hawke's Bay Hawks	6.7
2006	Brad Davidson	Australia	Manawatu Jets	4.8
2007	Paul Henare (4)	New Zealand	Hawke's Bay Hawks	6.4
2008	Jason Crowe	United States	Waikato Pistons	8.3
2009	Paul Henare (5)	New Zealand	Christchurch Cougars	6.5
2010	Lindsay Tait	New Zealand	Wellington Saints	7.1
2011	Jason Crowe (2)	United States	Waikato Pistons	7.2
2012	Jason Crowe (3)	United States	Wellington Saints	8.7
2013	Lindsay Tait (2)	New Zealand	Wellington Saints	8.1
2014	Mark Dickel (2)	New Zealand	Otago Nuggets	9.1
2015	Lindsay Tait (3)	New Zealand	Wellington Saints	8.9
2016	McKenzie Moore	United States	Canterbury Rams	8.2
2017	Jarrod Kenny	New Zealand	Hawke's Bay Hawks	7.5
2018	Lindsay Tait (4)	New Zealand	Super City Rangers	7.6
2019	Jarrod Kenny (2)	New Zealand	Hawke's Bay Hawks	6.8
2020	Derone Raukawa	New Zealand	Taranaki Mountainairs	7.6
2021	Courtney Belger	United States	Southland Sharks	5.7
2022	Jarrod West	United States	Nelson Giants	7.3
2023	Jeremy Kendle	United States	Southland Sharks	8.9
2024	Corey Webster	New Zealand	Auckland Tuatara	7.7
2025	Owen Foxwell	Australia	Taranaki Airs	8.0
2026	Carter Whitt	United States	Franklin Bulls	9.5

== See also ==
- List of National Basketball League (New Zealand) awards
