= Basketball in New Zealand =

- Country: New Zealand
- National team: New Zealand
- First played: 1908
- Clubs: 8 (Men)

The sport of basketball was first played in New Zealand in 1908.

== History ==
=== Beginnings (1908) ===
While basketball was invented by James Naismith in 1891, it did not reach New Zealand until the early 1900s. A former Naismith student, J. H. Greenwood, introduced basketball to New Zealand when he was appointed physical director of the Wellington branch of the YMCA in 1908. The sport was called indoor basketball to avoid confusion with the English offshoot of basketball played by females outdoors. New Zealand women's basketball was renamed netball in 1970. The YMCA spread the game from the 1920s, often with the help of American Mormon missionaries. By the mid-1930s men's and women's indoor basketball associations had been set up in the main cities and some smaller centres. From the start, both sexes were involved, the YMCA organising the men's leagues and the YWCA the women's. In 1935 the Auckland women's association had 14 teams. The first national indoor basketball tournament was held in Wellington in 1938. The 1939 national tournament, also in Wellington, drew a large crowd of spectators and was a hit with locals and local youth.

=== Post-war growth (1945–70) ===
Basketball's post-war growth was steady but unspectacular. Encouragement and resources to spread the game were supplied by the Physical Welfare and Recreation Branch of the Internal Affairs Department. But a lack of facilities impeded development. Basic technique, the coaching expertise to teach basketball and the regular competition to hone skills were all also lacking. The government-sponsored construction of war memorial community halls, in which basketball could be played, helped to alleviate the facilities obstacle. Between 1946 and 1961 the NZMIBA grew from 16 affiliated associations comprising 366 teams to 31 associations with 750 teams.

The deepening influence of Mormon missionaries in the game improved player skills as well as coaching. Between 1946 and 1961, at the conclusion of the national men's tournament, a New Zealand team would play a team of Mormon missionaries. The national team won the contest for the first time in 1951, hailed as New Zealand's first international basketball victory.

Although the NZMIBA welcomed the Mormons’ contribution to coaching – they introduced teams to zone defense – it was forced to ban the Mormons from proselytising at games in 1961. The game also benefited from visits from American coaches organised through the United States government. These included John Wooden, Stu Inman and Red Auerbach.

=== Creation of national leagues (1980s) ===
The 1980s ushered in a period of exceptional growth and popularity for the sport. Late in 1981, six men's teams – a mixture of club and provincial representative sides – went out alone and created an inaugural national league. It was enough of a success to come under the control of the NZBF the following year, when it grew in size and secured a naming sponsor. An allowance of two imported players (invariably Americans with college basketball experience) per team, and the fact that games were played in the evening indoors, helped turn the league into a new family entertainment option. Spectators filled gymnasiums and media coverage reached unprecedented levels.

Emblematic of these boom years was the league final played in Wellington in 1985 between local side Exchequer Saints and the Auckland Stars. Won by Saints in the final second of overtime, from a shot fired behind the three-point line by American import Kenny McFadden, the game was broadcast live on television to 750,000 viewers. Soon after the league's establishment, a men's second division was created, followed in 1986 by a women's national league. These new competitions superseded the old national tournament system at senior level.

=== Fall & rise (1990 onwards) ===
Competition from other indoor sports like cricket and netball, a lack of player development and poor management decisions were all factors in the decline of the national men's league in the early 1990s. Television coverage dropped, sponsorship dried up and public support waned. The sport's showpiece soon became a shadow of what it had been. The women's national league also experienced a sponsorship drought and dwindling crowds. In 1995 it was split into three provincial competitions – two in the North Island and one in the South – with a week-long tournament final to find a national champion.

==== National team success ====
A lack of competition for the national men's team in the late 1980s was reversed in the early 1990s, with ever more matches with United States college teams and international sides. A bright spot was the first-time attendance of the national women's team at the World Championships in Australia in 1994. The team, by now officially dubbed the ‘Tall Ferns’ (at the same time the men became the ‘Tall Blacks’), won one game, defeating Kenya 93–76.

In 1998 the Keith Mair-coached Tall Blacks beat Canada 85–79, a win that one commentator said confirmed ‘the Tall Blacks coming of age as a legitimate international basketball force.’1 In the same year the New Zealand Basketball Federation changed its name to Basketball New Zealand (BBNZ). Both national sides made their Olympic debuts in 2000 at Sydney, where each claimed a single victory.

In 2001 the Tall Blacks stunned the basketball world with a 2–1 home series victory over Australia in the world championship qualifying series. The best was yet to come. At the world tournament the following year in Indianapolis, the Tall Blacks set about toppling giant after giant: Russia and China both fell to the Kiwis. Puerto Rico was then defeated in the quarter-finals. The New Zealanders’ run only came to an end in the semi-finals against Yugoslavia, and the Tall Blacks eventually finished fourth in the world.

== Overview ==
New Zealand has one professional basketball team, the New Zealand Breakers, who compete in the Australian National Basketball League (ANBL). They do, however, have a semi-professional league which runs during winter months, the National Basketball League (New Zealand), with 9 teams competing. These teams attract strong local followings but their popularity pales in comparison to the NZ Breakers.

In 2001, they defeated Australia in a three-game series to qualify for the 2002 FIBA World Championship in Indianapolis. At the tournament they finished fourth, after beating Puerto Rico in the quarter-finals before losses to Yugoslavia and Germany. Tall Blacks captain Pero Cameron was the only non-NBA player named to the all-tournament team in Indianapolis.

The Tall Blacks qualified for the 2004 Athens Olympics, but again finished with a 1–5 record and lost to Australia in the playoff for ninth place. Their most noted moment was on the 7th day of the games, when they beat Serbia and Montenegro, 90–87.

The most well-known former New Zealand player Sean Marks who has retired from the National Basketball Association and currently being an assistant coach in San Antonio Spurs, with Kirk Penney and Steven Adams being the other players from New Zealand to play in the NBA.

== Notable current New Zealand Basketball players ==
=== Professional players ===
Image	Name	Position	Current league	Current team	Past teams
	Steven Adams	C	NBA	(United States) Houston Rockets (2024-present)	Wellington Saints; Oklahoma City Thunder (2013–2019) New Orleans Pelicans (2020–2021) Memphis Grizzlies (2021–2024)
	Jarrod Kenny	PG	NZNBL	(New Zealand) Hawke's Bay Hawks (2017–present)	Harbour Heat (2002–2008); Hawke's Bay Hawks (2009–2015); Perth Wildcats (2015–2017)
	Robert Loe	PF/C	NBL	New Zealand Breakers (2016–present)	KAOD

=== College players ===
Image	Name	Position	School	Conference
—	Sam Timmins	C	Washington	Pac-12
	Tai Webster	PG/SG	Nebraska	Big Ten
	Tai Wynyard	PF/C	Kentucky (2016–2018)	SEC

== Notable retired New Zealand basketball players ==
=== NBA ===
- Sean Marks
- Kirk Penney

=== Other leagues ===
- Tab Baldwin
- Pero Cameron
- Brent Charleton
- Aidan Daly
- Glen Denham
- Richard Dickel
- Casey Frank
- Paul Henare
- Martin Iti
- Bubba Lau'ese
- Puke Lenden
- Terrence Lewis
- Robert Loe
- Dontae Russo-Nance
