= Ronnie Joyner =

American basketball player (died 2024)

Personal information
- Born: March 8, 1959 Tennessee, U.S.
- Died: January 29, 2024 (aged 64) Auckland, New Zealand
- Listed height: 6 ft 6 in (1.98 m)

Career information
- High school: Collierville (Collierville, Tennessee)
- College: Cloud County CC (1978–1980); Washington State (1980–1982)
- NBA draft: 1982: undrafted
- Playing career: 1984–2001
- Position: Forward

Career history
- 1984: Wellington Saints
- 1985–1988: Ponsonby
- 1989: Waikato Warriors
- 1990: Auckland Cannons
- 1991–1993: Waikato Warriors
- 1994–1996: Hutt Valley Lakers
- 1997–1998: Northland Suns
- 2000–2001: North Harbour Kings

Career highlights
- NBL champion (1984); 2× NBL All-Star Five (1985, 1986); NBL Most Outstanding Forward (1985); 5× NBL scoring champion (1985–1987, 1991, 1998)

Ronnie Wynn Joyner (March 8, 1959 – January 29, 2024) was an American basketball player. After two years of college basketball at Washington State, he moved to New Zealand in 1984 and played 17 seasons in the National Basketball League (NBL). He finished his career as the league's all-time leading scorer with 8,828 career points.

== High school and college career ==
Joyner was born in the state of Tennessee. He attended Collierville High School in Collierville, Tennessee, where he averaged 18.1 and 21.5 points per game respectively during his final two prep seasons. As a freshman at Cloud County Community College in 1978–79, he averaged 23.8 points, including 37 points per game in his final eight games. He came back a year later and averaged 30.1 points per game, third among the nation's junior college scorers, and earned first-team JC All-America honors. Following his sophomore season, Joyner transferred to Washington State, where he was a streak shooter in his first season with the Cougars. He worked on his defensive game during his senior year, earning praise from head coach George Raveling. In 54 games for the Cougars over two seasons, he averaged 6.7 points and 2.6 rebounds in 18.0 minutes per game.

== NBL career ==
Joyner moved to New Zealand in 1984. He was recruited by his former Washington State teammate Kenny McFadden when the Wellington Saints needed a replacement import on the eve of the 1984 NBL finals. He went on help the Saints win the championship. Joyner had his first full season in the NBL in 1985, playing for the Auckland-based Ponsonby. He averaged 52.6 points per game for the season, which saw him being named the NBL Most Outstanding Forward while earning NBL All-Star Five honors. He continued on with Ponsonby in 1986 and earned All-Star Five honors for the second straight year. After two more seasons with Ponsonby, he joined the Waikato Warriors for the 1989 season. After a season with the Auckland Cannons in 1990, he returned to Waikato for the next three seasons. Between 1994 and 1996, he played for the Hutt Valley Lakers. In 1997 and 1998, he played for the Northland Suns. After a season away from the NBL in 1999, he played for the North Harbour Kings in 2000 and 2001. A hand injury limited him in his final season.

In his 17-year career, Joyner was a five-time league scoring champion. He retired with 291 games and a league-record 8,828 career points. He also ranked fifth all time in career rebounds (2,459).

== Personal life and death ==
After retiring from basketball, Joyner worked for 18 years as a nursing care assistant in an acute mental health ward at Waitemata District Health in Auckland.

Joyner died in January 2024 after battling stage four bowel cancer. His funeral was held in Auckland.
