= 1988 New Zealand NBL season =

- League: New Zealand NBL
- Sport: Basketball
- Number of teams: 10

Regular season
- Minor premiers: Wellington
- Top scorer: Tony Webster (North Shore)

Finals
- Champions: Wellington
- Runners-up: North Shore

New Zealand NBL seasons
- ← 1987 1989 →

The 1988 NBL season was the seventh season of the National Basketball League. With the relegation of Palmerston North in 1988, Waitemata returned to the NBL following a four-year hiatus after winning the Conference Basketball League (CBL) championship in 1987. Wellington won the championship in 1988 to claim their fourth league title.

== Final standings ==
#	Team
	Wellington
Silver medal	North Shore
3	New Plymouth
4	Waikato
5	Canterbury
6	Hawke's Bay
7	Waitemata
8	Auckland
9	Nelson
10	Ponsonby

=== Finals ===
Semi-finals
1	Wellington	73
4	Waikato	66
2	New Plymouth	79
3	North Shore	90

Final
Wellington	81
North Shore	78

== Season awards ==
- Most Outstanding Guard: John Welch (Waitemata)
- Most Outstanding NZ Guard: Byron Vaetoe (Auckland)
- Most Outstanding Forward: Kerry Boagni (Wellington)
- Most Outstanding NZ Forward/Centre: Glen Denham (Waikato)
- Scoring Champion: Tony Webster (North Shore)
- Rebounding Champion: John Martens (Waitemata)
- Assist Champion: Carl Golston (Waikato)
- Young Player of the Year: Warren Adams (New Plymouth)
- All-Star Five:
  - Kerry Boagni (Wellington)
  - Willie Burton (Hawke's Bay)
  - Carl Golston (Waikato)
  - Kenny McFadden (Wellington)
  - John Welch (Waitemata)
