= 1999 New Zealand NBL season =

- League: New Zealand NBL
- Sport: Basketball
- Teams: 9

Regular season
- Minor premiers: Auckland
- Top scorer: Terrence Lewis (Wellington)

Playoffs
- Champions: Auckland
- Runners-up: Canterbury

New Zealand NBL seasons
- ← 1998 2000 →

The 1999 NBL season was the 18th season of the National Basketball League. The 1999 season saw just nine teams compete, with Hawke's Bay joining the second-tiered Conference Basketball League (CBL) and Northland ceasing operations after four dismal seasons in the NBL. Auckland won the championship in 1999 to claim their sixth league title.

== Final standings ==
#	Team	W	L
	Auckland	12	4
Silver medal	Canterbury	9	7
3	North Harbour	9	7
4	Wellington	9	7
5	Nelson	9	7
6	Waikato	9	7
7	Taranaki	7	9
8	Otago	4	12
9	Palmerston North	4	12

== Season awards ==
- NZ Most Valuable Player: Pero Cameron (Auckland)
- Most Outstanding Guard: Terrence Lewis (Wellington)
- Most Outstanding NZ Guard: Kirk Penney (North Harbour)
- Most Outstanding Forward: Chris Ensminger (North Harbour)
- Most Outstanding NZ Forward/Centre: Pero Cameron (Auckland)
- Scoring Champion: Terrence Lewis (Wellington)
- Rebounding Champion: Chris Ensminger (North Harbour)
- Assist Champion: Willie Burton (Palmerston North)
- Rookie of the Year: Tony Rampton (Taranaki)
- Coach of the Year: Tab Baldwin (Auckland)
- All-Star Five:
  - G: Terrence Lewis (Wellington)
  - G: Phill Jones (Otago)
  - F: Scott Benson (Auckland)
  - F: Pero Cameron (Auckland)
  - C: Chris Ensminger (North Harbour)
