= B. J. Anthony =

New Zealand basketball player (born 1988)

Personal information
- Born: 20 July 1988 (age 38) Auckland, New Zealand
- Listed height: 200 cm (6 ft 7 in)

Career information
- High school: Avondale College (Auckland, New Zealand)
- Playing career: 2008–2018
- Position: Power forward

Career history
- 2008–2010: Harbour Heat
- 2008–2010: Herzoege Wolfenbuettel
- 2008–2009: →SG MTV/BG 93 Wolfenbuttel
- 2010–2012: New Zealand Breakers
- 2011: Waikato Pistons
- 2012–2013: Otago Nuggets
- 2013: BBC Solarto Eagles Magdeburg
- 2013–2015: Adelaide 36ers
- 2014: Wellington Saints
- 2015: Plymouth Raiders
- 2016–2018: Wellington Saints

Career highlights
- 2× NBL champion (2011, 2012); 3× NZNBL champion (2014, 2016, 2017); NZNBL All-Star Five (2013); NZNBL Most Outstanding Kiwi Forward/Centre (2013); German Regionalliga All-Star Five (2013)

Benny Charles "B. J." Anthony Jr. (born 20 July 1988) is a New Zealand former professional basketball player who played multiple seasons in both the Australian NBL and New Zealand NBL. He also played in Germany and England, and represented the New Zealand Tall Blacks on multiple occasions.

== Early life ==
Anthony was born in Auckland, New Zealand. He attended Avondale College and played for the school's basketball team.

== Professional career ==
=== New Zealand NBL ===
Anthony made his debut in the New Zealand NBL in 2008 with the Harbour Heat. He continued on with the Heat in 2009 and 2010. After a season with the Waikato Pistons in 2011, Anthony signed with the Otago Nuggets for the 2012 season. However, he missed the entire season due to injury. He returned to the Nuggets for the 2013 season.

In 2014, Anthony won a championship as a member of the Wellington Saints. He had signed with the Super City Rangers for the 2015 season, but missed the entire season due to injury. He re-joined the Saints in 2016 and won his second championship, going on to win his third with the Saints in 2017. He played a fourth season with the Saints in 2018, but missed the second half of the season with a broken foot.

=== Australian NBL ===
In the 2010–11 season, Anthony made his debut in the Australian NBL as a development player with the New Zealand Breakers. He played a second season with the Breakers in 2011–12 as a full-time contracted player. He won two championships in his two seasons with the Breakers.

For the 2013–14 season, Anthony played for the Adelaide 36ers. He continued on with the 36ers in 2014–15, but missed the second half of the season with an Achilles tendon injury.

=== Europe ===
For the 2008–09 and 2009–10 seasons, Anthony played in Germany for Herzoege Wolfenbuettel of the ProB. During his first season, he also spent time with SG MTV/BG 93 Wolfenbuttel in the Regionalliga.

In January 2013, Anthony returned to Germany and joined BBC Solarto Eagles Magdeburg for the rest of the 2012–13 season. He went on to earn Regionalliga All-Star Five honours.

For the 2015–16 season, Anthony joined the Plymouth Raiders of the British Basketball League. He appeared in five games before being released by the club on 7 November 2015 due to poor behaviour off the court.

== National team career ==
Anthony was selected to join the Tall Blacks on 17 August 2009 for the first time as an injury replacement for Jeremiah Trueman. He participated in the 2009 FIBA Oceania Championship and the 2010 FIBA World Championship.

== Personal ==
Anthony's father, Benny Sr. (1958–2026), played and coached in the New Zealand NBL.

Anthony holds a British passport thanks to his English-born mother.
