= Willie Burton (basketball, born 1962) =

American-New Zealand basketball player

Hawke's Bay Hawks
- Title: Assistant coach
- League: NZNBL

Personal information
- Born: 24 June 1962 (age 64) Georgia, U.S.
- Listed height: 201 cm (6 ft 7 in)

Career information
- High school: Jenkins County (Millen, Georgia)
- College: Tennessee (1980–1984)
- NBA draft: 1984: 6th round, 125th overall pick
- Drafted by: Denver Nuggets
- Playing career: 1985–2006
- Position: Power forward
- Coaching career: 2026–present

Career history

Playing
- 1985–1986: Palmerston North Jets
- 1987–1988: Hawke's Bay Hawks
- 1989–1990: Palmerston North Jets
- 1991–1993: New Plymouth Bulls/Bears
- 1994–1997: Hawke's Bay Hawks
- 1999–2000: Palmerston North Jets
- 2001–2002, 2005–2006: Hawke's Bay Hawks

Coaching
- 2026–present: Hawke's Bay Hawks (assistant)

Career highlights
- NZNBL champion (2006); 8× NZNBL All-Star Five (1985, 1987–1993); NZNBL Most Outstanding Forward (1989); NZNBL Most Outstanding Kiwi Forward/Centre (1997); 6× NZNBL rebounding champion (1985, 1987, 1989–1991, 1994); NZNBL assist champion (1999); No. 14 retired by Hawke's Bay Hawks
- Stats at Basketball Reference

Willie James Burton Jr. (born 24 June 1962) is an American-New Zealand basketball coach and former player is currently an assistant coach of the Hawke's Bay Hawks of the New Zealand National Basketball League (NZNBL). He played 19 seasons in the New Zealand NBL with Palmerston North, Hawke's Bay Hawks and New Plymouth Bulls/Bears. He won a NZNBL championship with the Hawks in 2006, which marked his final season as he retired at age 44.

Burton won six rebounding titles and finished his career first on the league's all-time leading rebounds list with 4,244 career rebounds.

== Early life and career ==
Burton grew up playing baseball in his hometown of Millen, Georgia. His father, Willie James Sr., was a keen baseball player, but Burton gravitated towards basketball after a friend introduced him to the sport around the age of 12. He went on to play four years of college basketball for the University of Tennessee between 1980 and 1984. He appeared in 111 games for the Volunteers over his career, and averaged a team-high 13.5 points per game as a senior in 1983–84. He also led the team in rebounds per game as a junior and senior (8.1 and 7.3 per game respectively), and blocks per game as a sophomore and junior (1.3 and 0.8 per game respectively).

Following his senior season with Tennessee, Burton was selected in the sixth round of the 1984 NBA draft by the Denver Nuggets. He subsequently attended training camp with the Nuggets, but he did not make the final roster cut.

=== College statistics ===
Year	Team	GP	GS	MPG	FG%	3P%	FT%	RPG	APG	SPG	BPG	PPG
1980–81	Tennessee	14	0	5.0	.524	.000	.333	1.9	.0	.4	.4	1.7
1981–82	Tennessee	30	30	26.1	.511	.000	.667	5.4	1.3	.9	1.3	5.6
1982–83	Tennessee	32	32	34.2	.498	.000	.705	8.1	2.7	1.2	.8	9.1
1983–84	Tennessee	35	35	34.4	.523	.000	.765	7.3	2.2	1.3	.6	13.5
Career		111	97	28.4	.513	.000	.716	6.3	1.8	1.1	.8	8.6

== Professional career ==
In 1985, Burton moved to New Zealand and joined the Palmerston North Jets of the National Basketball League (NZNBL). In his first season, he averaged 28.6 points and a league-high 16.1 rebounds per game. He continued on with the Jets in 1986 before joining the Hawke's Bay Hawks in 1987. After two seasons with the Hawks, he returned to Palmerston North, playing for them in 1989 and 1990. In 1991, he joined New Plymouth and played three seasons for the team before returning to Hawke's Bay in 1994 where he spent the next four years. After playing in the second division competition for the North Otago Penguins in 1998, he returned to Palmerston North for a third stint in 1999, but again re-joined the Hawks just two seasons later. Burton retired following the 2002 season, but came out of retirement in 2005 to help the Hawks reach the grand final, where they were defeated by the Auckland Stars by one point. He played one final season in 2006, this time winning his first and only championship with an 85–69 win in the grand final over Auckland. He retired for a second time following the 2006 season, departing the NZNBL after 19 seasons.

Burton finished his NZNBL career as an eight-time All-Star Five honouree and a six-time rebounding champion. He was also named Most Outstanding Forward in 1989, and after gaining New Zealand citizenship in the mid-90s, he was named Most Outstanding Kiwi Forward/Centre in 1997. As evidence of his all-round game, he also won the league assist title in 1999 with 5.6 assists per game. His 4,244 career rebounds ranks first on the league's all-time rebounding list.

After retiring from playing, Burton continued on as an assistant coach with the Hawks, while also coaching the Hawke's Bay under 15, 17 and 19 men's teams.

In June 2025, Burton's number 14 jersey was retired by the Hawke's Bay Hawks.

== National team career ==
Burton debuted for the New Zealand Tall Blacks in 2001 at the Goodwill Games. He had two more stints with the Tall Blacks, playing in series against Australia (2001) and Hungary (2002). Burton was still in the selection mix for the 2002 FIBA World Championship, but was replaced by Ed Book as the team's one allowable naturalised player.

== Coaching career ==
Burton joined the Hawke's Bay Hawks as an assistant coach for the 2026 New Zealand NBL season.

== Personal life ==
Burton and his wife Suzanne, a New Zealander, have two sons, Alonzo and Dominique. Alonzo followed in his father's footsteps and joined the Hawke's Bay Hawks in 2012.
