= 1986 New Zealand NBL season =

- League: New Zealand NBL
- Sport: Basketball
- Number of teams: 10

Regular season
- Minor premiers: Canterbury
- Top scorer: Ronnie Joyner (Ponsonby)

Playoffs
- Champions: Canterbury
- Runners-up: Wellington

New Zealand NBL seasons
- ← 1985 1987 →

The 1986 NBL season was the fifth season of the National Basketball League. Two changes occurred for the 1986 season, with Napier now called Hawke's Bay, while Centrals were dropped from the league and replaced by 1985 Conference Basketball League (CBL) champions North Shore. Canterbury won 16 of their 18 round-robin games, qualifying for the finals in top spot. While Wellington contested their fourth straight final, Canterbury won the championship to claim their first league title. John "Dutchie" Rademakers top scored for Canterbury in the final with 22 points, while American point guard Clyde Huntley added 20 and fellow import, Angelo Hill, 15. Youngster Ian Webb also contributed 13 points, as Canterbury defeated Wellington 87–82.

== Final standings ==
#	Team
	Canterbury
Silver medal	Wellington
3	Ponsonby
4	New Plymouth
5	Palmerston North
6	North Shore
7	Nelson
8	Auckland
9	Hamilton
10	Hawke's Bay

== Season awards ==
- Most Outstanding Guard: Clyde Huntley (Canterbury)
- Most Outstanding NZ Guard: John Rademakers (Canterbury)
- Most Outstanding Forward: Frank Smith (Nelson)
- Most Outstanding NZ Forward/Centre: John Saker (Wellington)
- Scoring Champion: Ronnie Joyner (Ponsonby)
- Rebounding Champion: Frank Smith (Nelson)
- Assist Champion: Tony Webster (North Shore)
- Young Player of the Year: Tony Compain (Ponsonby)
- All-Star Five:
  - Clyde Huntley (Canterbury)
  - Ollie Johnson (Wellington)
  - Ronnie Joyner (Ponsonby)
  - Frank Smith (Nelson)
  - Tony Webster (North Shore)
