= Nick Horvath =

American-New Zealand basketball player (born 1981)

Personal information
- Born: February 18, 1981 (age 45) Shoreview, Minnesota
- Listed height: 208 cm (6 ft 10 in)
- Listed weight: 113 kg (249 lb)

Career information
- High school: Mounds View (Arden Hills, Minnesota)
- College: Duke (1999–2004)
- NBA draft: 2004: undrafted
- Playing career: 2004–2015
- Position: Center / power forward

Career history
- 2004–2006: West Sydney Razorbacks
- 2006–2008: Wellington Saints
- 2006–2007: Adelaide 36ers
- 2007–2009: South Dragons
- 2010: Wellington Saints
- 2011–2015: Manawatu Jets
- 2015: Sydney Kings
- 2015: Wellington Saints

Career highlights
- NBL champion (2009); NZNBL champion (2010); NZNBL MVP (2012); 4× NZNBL All-Star Five (2006, 2008, 2012, 2013); NCAA champion (2001); Minnesota Mr. Basketball (1999)

Nicholas Alexander Horvath (born February 18, 1981) is an American-New Zealand former professional basketball player who played the majority of his career in the New Zealand National Basketball League (NZNBL). In 2010, he became the first person to win an NCAA championship (2001), an ANBL championship (2009) and a NZNBL championship (2010).

== High school and college career ==
Horvath attended Mounds View High School in Arden Hills, Minnesota where he led the Mustangs to state tournament appearances in 1998 and 1999, where they captured the 1999 AA State Championship. Horvath was also named the 1999 Minnesota Mr. Basketball.

Horvath played college basketball at Duke University from 1999 to 2004, where he was a part of the 2000–01 NCAA championship team.

== Professional career ==
Horvath's first season out of college was spent with the West Sydney Razorbacks during the 2004–05 NBL season.

In July 2005, Horvath joined the Minnesota Timberwolves for the 2005 NBA Summer League. Later that year, he re-signed with the Razorbacks for the 2005–06 NBL season. On September 2, 2005, Horvath dislocated his kneecap in the Razorbacks' season opening loss to the Townsville Crocodiles and subsequently missed three months of action. On November 26, 2005, he made his return from injury, recording nine points and five rebounds in a loss to the Wollongong Hawks. However, in the Razorbacks' next game on December 2, he sustained a season-ending toe injury. After recovering from the injury, he moved to New Zealand and joined the Wellington Saints for the 2006 New Zealand NBL season.

In July 2006, Horvath joined the Los Angeles Lakers for the 2006 NBA Summer League. Later that year, he signed with the Adelaide 36ers for the 2006–07 NBL season. Following the ANBL season, he re-joined the Wellington Saints for the 2007 New Zealand NBL season.

On April 11, 2007, Horvath signed a two-year deal with the South Dragons. On October 25, 2007, Horvath was replaced in the Razorbacks' squad by Bakari Hendrix following the Dragons' 0–6 start to the season. However, despite this, he was not released by the Dragons and continued to train with them for the rest of the season, waiting to see if he'd receive his New Zealand citizenship to be able to play as a local instead of an import. He did not receive his citizenship before the 2007–08 season ended, and in February 2008, he re-joined the Wellington Saints for the 2008 season. Following the Saints' 92–80 win over the Canterbury Rams on March 23, 2008, Horvath took a leave of absence from his duties with the Saints to wed his fiancé, Sheree Phillips.

On April 16, 2008, Horvath was granted New Zealand citizenship, ending a year-long process, allowing him to play as a local in both the New Zealand and Australian NBL, while also making him eligible to play for the Tall Blacks. Later that year, he re-joined the South Dragons for the 2008–09 season, going on to win the ANBL championship.

After winning the championship with the South Dragons, Horvath disappeared from the basketball scene in 2009, citing mental and physical exhaustion. He instead decided to travel his homeland America with his wife Sheree. In 2010, Horvath returned to New Zealand and re-joined the Wellington Saints. He went on to help the Saints win their sixth league title, and first since 2003.

In January 2011, Horvath signed with the Manawatu Jets. During the 2011 season, he led the NZNBL in rebounding with an average of 11.7 per game. In 2012, with the Jets, Horvath had his best ever season as a professional, averaging 19.5 points and an astounding 15.8 rebounds per game. He was awarded the MVP, Kiwi MVP, outstanding forward, outstanding NZ forward/centre, and leading rebounder. He was also named to the All-Star Five. In 2013, Horvath was again named to the All-Star Five.

On November 14, 2013, Horvath re-signed with the Jets for the 2014 season. He missed the first eight games of the season due to a groin injury.

On January 14, 2015, Horvath signed a short-term deal with the Sydney Kings to replace the injured Angus Brandt. After a three-game stint with the Kings, he returned to Manawatu and re-signed with the Jets for the 2015 season on January 27. However, due to a lingering knee injury, he struggled while playing for the Jets and following the team's May 16 game against the Taranaki Mountainairs, he was released by the Jets management under controversial circumstances and despite Horvath's protests that he was medically fine. He was later signed by the Wellington Saints on May 22 for the rest of the season.

In April 2016, Horvath announced his retirement from the game due to a combination of injury, family commitments and the Manawatu Jets pulling out of the NBL.

== National team career ==
In 1998, Horvath helped lead USA to a gold medal at the World Youth Games in Moscow. He finished as USA's seventh-leading scorer (7.2 ppg) and fourth-leading rebounder (5.7 rpg).

Horvath earned the naturalised spot on the New Zealand Tall Blacks squad to compete in the 2008 Olympics Qualifying Tournament. In his only tournament with the Tall Blacks, Horvath averaged 3.7 points and 5.7 rebounds in three games.

== Personal ==
Horvath's wife, Sheree Phillips, is a former Black Sticks hockey player. The couple have two children.

With his retirement from playing basketball, Horvath, a long-time physics teacher at Palmerston North Boys' High School, became the coach of the school's top basketball team.
