= Carlin Davison =

New Zealand basketball player (born 2003)

No. 0 – New Zealand Breakers
- Position: Forward
- League: NBL

Personal information
- Born: 21 August 2003 (age 23) New Plymouth, New Zealand
- Listed height: 197 cm (6 ft 6 in)
- Listed weight: 96 kg (212 lb)

Career information
- High school: New Plymouth Boys' (New Plymouth, New Zealand)
- NBA draft: 2025: undrafted
- Playing career: 2020–present

Career history
- 2020–2025: Taranaki Mountainairs/Airs
- 2023–present: New Zealand Breakers
- 2026: Wellington Saints

Career highlights
- NBL Ignite Cup winner (2026); NZNBL All-Star Five (2025); NZNBL Most Outstanding Kiwi Forward/Centre (2025)

Carlin Davison (born 21 August 2003) is a New Zealand professional basketball player for the New Zealand Breakers of the Australian National Basketball League (NBL). He debuted in the New Zealand National Basketball League (NZNBL) in 2020 with the Taranaki Mountainairs, going on to join the New Zealand Breakers for the first time in 2023. With Taranaki in 2025, he was named to the NZNBL All-Star Five and earned NZNBL Most Outstanding Kiwi Forward/Centre. He debuted for the New Zealand Tall Blacks at the 2025 FIBA Asia Cup.

== Early life ==
Davison was born in New Plymouth, New Zealand. He hails from the Taranaki town of Stratford, where he grew up with his parents and two sisters. He attended New Plymouth Boys' High School, where he was initially accepted into the rugby academy before turning his attention to basketball.

== Professional career ==
Davison joined the Taranaki Mountainairs of the New Zealand National Basketball League (NZNBL) for the 2020 season, debuting as a 16-year-old. In five games, he averaged 3.2 points per game. He re-joined the Mountainairs for the 2021 season, where he averaged 8.1 points, 4.4 rebounds, 2.5 assists and 1.2 steals in 17 games. With Taranaki in the 2022 season, he averaged 8.5 points, 4.3 rebounds, 2.3 assists and 1.3 steals in 19 games.

Davison attempted to enter the 2023 NBA draft, but ultimately withdrew his name from consideration and re-joined the Taranaki Airs on 30 May 2023 for the second half of the 2023 NZNBL season. In nine games, he averaged 11.2 points, 7.0 rebounds, 3.0 assists and 2.3 steals per game.

On 1 September 2023, Davison signed a two-year development deal (with a third-year team option) with the New Zealand Breakers of the Australian National Basketball League (NBL). He did not play in a game for the Breakers in the 2023–24 season. He returned to the Airs for the 2024 NZNBL season, where he averaged 17.1 points, 8.0 rebounds, 3.2 assists and 1.5 steals in 21 games.

With the Breakers in the 2024–25 NBL season, Davison appeared in 10 games and averaged 2.0 points and 1.4 rebounds per game. With the Airs in the 2025 NZNBL season, he was named to the NZNBL All-Star Five and earned NZNBL Most Outstanding Kiwi Forward/Centre. In 21 games, he averaged 18.9 points, 7.7 rebounds, 6.0 assists and 2.0 steals per game.

On 8 July 2025, Davison was selected by the Rip City Remix of the NBA G League with the sixth overall pick in the 2025 NBA G League International draft. He did not join the Remix.

Davison re-joined the Breakers for the 2025–26 NBL season as a fully contracted player. In the regular-season finale on 19 February 2026, Davison had 15 points and 11 rebounds in a 115–84 win over the Cairns Taipans. The Breakers finished outside the finals spots in seventh at the end of the regular season but won the inaugural NBL Ignite Cup Final, defeating the Adelaide 36ers 111–107. In the Ignite Cup Final, Davison had five points, two rebounds, one assist and one steal in 16 minutes off the bench. In 33 games, he averaged 5.2 points, 3.3 rebounds and 1.2 assists per game.

Davison joined the Wellington Saints for the 2026 NZNBL season. On 25 May 2026, he recorded a triple-double with 13 points, 10 rebounds and 12 assists in a 107–79 win over the Hawke's Bay Hawks. He helped the Saints reach the NZNBL grand final, where they lost 104–101 in overtime to the Southland Sharks despite Davison's 19 points, 11 rebounds and nine assists. In 22 games, he averaged 14.0 points, 7.0 rebounds, 7.4 assists and 1.9 steals per game.

On 12 May 2026, Davison re-signed with the Breakers for the 2026–27 season. Early in the season, he was thrust into the point guard role following an injury to Parker Jackson-Cartwright. On 10 October, Davison recorded 11 assists in a 100–84 loss to the Perth Wildcats. Four days later, he started in the point guard role against the Sydney Kings and produced a career-best performance with 20 points, 14 assists, four rebounds and four steals in a 102–101 win. He became the first New Zealand-born player since Mark Dickel in 2001 to have back-to-back 10-plus assist games in the NBL while also becoming just the third player (after Bryce Cotton and Kendric Davis) since the league reverted to 40-minute games to have at least 20 points, 10 assists and four steals. Over a seven-game stretch, he averaged 10.3 assists in 27.0 minutes, after 1.4 assists in 18.0 minutes over the first five. On 13 November, he recorded a triple-double with 19 points, 13 assists, 12 rebounds and three steals in a 94–90 overtime win over the Brisbane Bullets. Two days later, he narrowly missed a second straight triple-double with 11 points, 15 assists and nine rebounds in a 111–102 double-overtime loss to the Kings.

== National team career ==
Davison debuted for the New Zealand Tall Blacks at the 2025 FIBA Asia Cup. He played for the Tall Blacks during the 2027 FIBA Basketball World Cup Asian qualifiers.

== Personal life ==
Davison is the son of Justin and Brenda, and he has an older sister, Tiana, and a younger sister, Maddison. Tiana is a professional rugby league player.
