= 1983 New Zealand NBL season =

- League: New Zealand NBL
- Sport: Basketball
- Number of games: 14
- Number of teams: 8

Regular season
- Minor premiers: Auckland
- Top scorer: Kenny McFadden (Wellington)

Playoffs
- Champions: Auckland
- Runners-up: Wellington

New Zealand NBL seasons
- ← 1982 1984 →

The 1983 NBL season was the second season of the National Basketball League. With the relegation of Hamilton and Palmerston North to the Conference Basketball League (CBL), Wellington and Napier were promoted to the NBL for the 1983 season. Auckland won the championship in 1983 to claim their second league title.

== Summary ==
=== Regular season standings ===
Pos
Pos	Team	W	L
1	Auckland	10	4
2	Wellington	10	4
3	Napier	9	5
4	Waitemata	8	6
5	Centrals	7	7
6	Canterbury	5	9
7	Nelson	5	9
8	Porirua	2	12

=== Final standings ===
#	Team
	Auckland
Silver medal	Wellington
3	Napier
4	Waitemata
5	Canterbury
6	Centrals
7	Nelson
8	Porirua

== Season awards ==
- Most Outstanding Guard: Kenny McFadden (Wellington)
- Most Outstanding Forward: Ben Anthony (Auckland)
- Scoring Champion: Kenny McFadden (Wellington)
- Rebounding Champion: Robbie Robinson (Napier)
- All-Star Five:
  - Ben Anthony (Auckland)
  - Thomas DeMarcus (Napier)
  - Stan Hill (Auckland)
  - Clyde Huntley (Canterbury)
  - Kenny McFadden (Wellington)
