= Kerry Boagni =

American basketball player (born 1964)

Personal information
- Born: September 24, 1964 (age 62) Los Angeles, California
- Listed height: 6 ft 8 in (2.03 m)
- Listed weight: 205 lb (93 kg)

Career information
- High school: Serra (Gardena, California)
- College: Kansas (1982–1984); Cal State Fullerton (1984–1986)
- NBA draft: 1986: 5th round, 105th overall pick
- Drafted by: Utah Jazz
- Playing career: 1988–1999
- Position: Power forward

Career history
- 1988–1992: Wellington Saints
- 1993–1995: Hawke's Bay Hawks
- 1996–1997: Wellington Saints
- 1998: North Harbour Kings
- 1999: North Otago Penguins

Career highlights
- CBL champion (1999); NBL champion (1988); 4× NBL All-Star Five (1988, 1990, 1991, 1993); 3× NBL Most Outstanding Forward (1988, 1990, 1993); 2× NBL scoring champion (1992, 1993); First-team Parade All-American (1982); McDonald's All-American (1982)
- Stats at Basketball Reference
Medals
Men's basketball
Representing United States
FIBA U19 World Championship
Gold medal – first place	1983 Palma de Mallorca	National team

Kerry Martin Boagni (born September 24, 1964) is an American former professional basketball player. A native of California, he played college basketball for the Cal State Fullerton Titans before being drafted by the Utah Jazz in the 1986 NBA draft. He then began a very successful career in New Zealand, playing the majority of his years for the Wellington Saints.

== Early life ==
Boagni was born in Los Angeles, California. He attended Serra High School in Gardena, California, where he played basketball. A star forward, Boagni averaged 24 points and 17 rebounds per game and shot 61% from the floor. He was named to the 1982 Sporting News' Top 10 prep list, the USA Men's U.S. Olympic Festival Roster, and made more than a half dozen All-America teams. Boagni played in the 1982 McDonald's All-American Boys Game, along with future NBA stars Dell Curry and Kenny Walker.

== College career ==
A highly regarded recruit, Boagni selected the University of Kansas to pursue his basketball career. In his freshman year, he was the team's No. 2 scorer (14 points per game), scored in double figures 23 times, and was named to the Big Eight Conference all-freshman team. After playing 10 games for Kansas in his sophomore year, Boagni transferred to California State University, Fullerton and excelled. The Utah Jazz subsequently picked Boagni with the 105th overall draft pick in the 1986 NBA draft.

== Professional career ==
Boagni landed in New Zealand in 1988 where he began a successful NBL career with the Wellington Saints. Boagni and fellow American Kenny McFadden became club legends as they helped the Saints win the 1988 championship and both earned All-Star Five honors. Boagni played five seasons for the Saints, departing the club for the Hawke's Bay Hawks in 1993. Between 1993 and 1998, Boagni played for the Hawks, had a second stint with the Saints, and had one season with the North Harbour Kings. In 267 career NBL games, Boagni recorded 6,929 points (ranked second all-time) and 1,870 rebounds (ranked ninth all-time). Then in 1999, he served as player-coach of the North Otago Penguins and helped them win the Conference Basketball League championship.

== Personal ==
Boagni's ex-partner, Jane McMeeken, was a former captain of the New Zealand women's national basketball team. His daughter, Tessa, has played in the Women's Basketball Championship, the top women's basketball competition in New Zealand.
