= Aidan Daly =

New Zealand basketball player

Personal information
- Born: 22 August 1978 (age 48) Napier, New Zealand
- Listed height: 185 cm (6 ft 1 in)

Career information
- High school: Napier Boys' (Napier, New Zealand); Notre Dame Academy (Middleburg, Virginia)
- Playing career: 1997–2016
- Position: Point guard
- Coaching career: 2022–present

Career history

Playing
- 1997–1998: Hawke's Bay Hawks
- 1999–2002: Wellington Saints
- 2003–2008: Hawke's Bay Hawks
- 2009: Manawatu Jets
- 2010: Christchurch Cougars
- 2011–2013: Hawke's Bay Hawks
- 2016: Hawke's Bay Hawks

Coaching
- 2022; 2024–: Hawke's Bay Hawks (assistant)

Career highlights
- NBL champion (2006)

Aidan Craig Daly (born 22 August 1978) is a New Zealand former basketball player who played 18 seasons in the National Basketball League (NBL), including 12 with the Hawke's Bay Hawks.

== High school ==
Daly attended Napier Boys' High School and Notre Dame Academy.

== NBL career ==
Between 1997 and 2013, Daly played in the National Basketball League (NBL) for the Hawke's Bay Hawks, Wellington Saints, Manawatu Jets and Christchurch Cougars. He returned to the NBL in 2016, re-joining the Hawks to play for his sister, Kirstin, who was appointed the team's head coach. He was subsequently named team co-captain for his return season. It was his final season in the NBL.

Daly served as an assistant coach of the Hawks in 2022, 2024, 2025 and 2026.

== Personal life ==
Daly's father, Craig, has previously served as the Hawke's Bay Hawks' team manager.
