= Terrence Lewis =

Terrence Lewis or Terence Lewis may refer to:

- Terence Lewis (choreographer), Indian dancer and choreographer
- Terrence Lewis (basketball), American-New Zealand former professional basketball player
