= 1997 New Zealand NBL season =

- League: New Zealand NBL
- Sport: Basketball
- Number of teams: 11

Regular season
- Minor premiers: Auckland
- Top scorer: Jim DeGraffenreid (Waikato)

Playoffs
- Champions: Auckland
- Runners-up: Nelson

New Zealand NBL seasons
- ← 1996 1998 →

The 1997 NBL season was the 16th season of the National Basketball League. Basketball in New Zealand began to dwindle during the 1990s, with TV coverage reduced, sponsorships scarce, and crowd numbers on the decline. At the end of the 1996 season, with both Wellington and Hutt Valley struggling to survive, the two teams amalgamated for the 1997 season.

Auckland won the championship in 1997 to claim their fifth league title, as they became the first team in league history to record a three-peat. Auckland had a near-perfect season, with their only loss in 24 regular-season games coming against Canterbury at Cowles Stadium when American import Adrian Boyd was called for a contentious travelling call while going for an uncontested lay-up in the game's final seconds.

== Final standings ==
#	Team
	Auckland
Silver medal	Nelson
3	Hawke's Bay
4	Otago
5	North Harbour
6	Wellington
7	Canterbury
8	Northland
9	Waikato
10	Palmerston North
11	Taranaki

== Season awards ==
- NZ Most Valuable Player: Pero Cameron (Auckland)
- Most Outstanding Guard: Tony Bennett (North Harbour)
- Most Outstanding NZ Guard: Phill Jones (Nelson)
- Most Outstanding Forward: Jim DeGraffenreid (Waikato)
- Most Outstanding NZ Forward/Centre: Willie Burton (Hawke's Bay)
- Scoring Champion: Jim DeGraffenreid (Waikato)
- Rebounding Champion: Daryn Shaw (Taranaki)
- Assist Champion: Mike Foster (Northland)
- Rookie of the Year: Brendon Polyblank (Palmerston North)
- Coach of the Year: Tab Baldwin (Auckland)
- All-Star Five:
  - G: Tony Bennett (North Harbour)
  - G: Adrian Boyd (Auckland)
  - F: Jim DeGraffenreid (Waikato)
  - F: Kenny Stone (Auckland)
  - C: Pero Cameron (Auckland)
