= Jason Crowe (basketball) =

American basketball player (born 1976)

Personal information
- Born: August 24, 1976 (age 50) Inglewood, California, U.S.
- Listed height: 193 cm (6 ft 4 in)
- Listed weight: 84 kg (185 lb)

Career information
- High school: Inglewood (Inglewood, California)
- College: L.A. Trade–Tech (1995–1996); American (1996–1997); Cal State Northridge (1998–1999)
- NBA draft: 1999: undrafted
- Playing career: 1999–2012
- Position: Shooting guard / point guard

Career history
- 1999: La Crosse Bobcats
- 2000–2001: Sloga
- 2002–2003: Kyiv
- 2004: Long Beach Jam
- 2005: Szolnoki Olaj
- 2005–2006: Petrochimi Bandar Imam
- 2006–2007: SKS Starogard Gdański
- 2007–2008: Waikato Pistons
- 2007–2008: Gold Coast Blaze
- 2009: Pioneros de Quintana Roo
- 2009: Cocodrilos de Caracas
- 2009–2010: Dnipro
- 2010–2011: Levski Sofia
- 2011: Waikato Pistons
- 2011: Phoenix Hagen
- 2012: Wellington Saints

Career highlights
- NZNBL champion (2008); NZNBL MVP (2008); NZNBL Most Outstanding Guard (2008); 3× NZNBL assist champion (2008, 2011, 2012); 2× NZNBL All-Star Five (2008, 2011); Ukrainian League Defender of the Year (2010); Ukrainian League All-Star (2010)

Jason Darius Crowe (born August 24, 1976) is an American former professional basketball player. He graduated from Cal State Northridge in 1999 and played 13 years as a professional in Europe, South America, Iran, Australia and New Zealand.

== College career ==
Crowe attended Inglewood High School in Inglewood, California, before playing his first season of college basketball at Los Angeles Trade–Technical College in 1995–96. He transferred to American University in April 1996, signing with the Eagles men's basketball program for the 1996–97 season. As a sophomore in 1996–97, Crowe averaged 4.0 points, 2.3 rebounds and 1.1 assists in 21 games.

In 1997, Crowe transferred again, this time to Cal State Northridge. He subsequently sat out the 1997–98 season due to NCAA transfer regulations, joining the Matadors squad for the 1998–99 season as a redshirted junior. Crowe was expected to make the Matadors a potent offensive threat, but despite flashes of brilliance, the transition was not as smooth as coach Bobby Braswell would have liked. While he often dished out great assists, he also had a high turnover count, which frustrated Braswell. Crowe finished the 1998–99 season with averages of 4.8 points, 2.8 assists, 3.6 assists and 1.6 steals in 29 games. He did not return to Cal State Northridge for the 1999–2000 season after graduating from the school.

== Professional career ==
=== Early years ===
Crowe first joined the La Crosse Bobcats of the Continental Basketball Association for the 1999–2000 season, but was released on November 12, 1999. For the 2000–01 season, Crowe moved to Serbia to play for Sloga.

In early 2002, Crowe moved to Ukraine and signed with BC Kyiv where he spent the rest of the 2001–02 season. In 10 games for Kyiv, he averaged 13.4 points, 4.7 rebounds, 5.0 assists and 3.0 steals per game. Later that year, in October, Crowe joined the Los Angeles Clippers for their training camp. Unfortunately, he did not make the team's final roster and in January 2003, he re-joined BC Kyiv. He had another stint with the Clippers in October 2003, but again did not get past training camp. In February 2004, he joined the Long Beach Jam of the American Basketball Association.

Crowe moved to Hungary for the 2004–05 season, originally signing with Klima-Vill Kaposvar SE, but was released by the club prior to the start of the regular season. He later joined Szolnoki Olaj in February 2005 and appeared in five games for the club, averaging 9.4 points, 2.6 rebounds, 3.8 assists and 3.8 steals per game.

Crowe moved to Iran for the 2005–06 season, signing with Petrochimi Bandar Imam on a $30,000 a month contract. He later cited that his stint in Iran was his worst experience, stating "There's absolutely no social life [in Iran]. None. I was over there just trying to get through and make it home." His wife, Irene, spent the season with him in Iran, but due to the Islamic-ruling government which requires strict clothing cover for women in public, she often did not leave the house for three to four weeks at a time. In 36 games for Petrochimi, he averaged 22.3 points per game.

=== New Zealand and Australia ===
Crowe's next stint brought him back to Europe, trialling with Polish club Anwil Włocławek in November 2006. He ended up signing with SKS Starogard Gdański and played 11 games for the club before departing in February 2007. In those 11 games, he averaged 9.5 points, 5.0 rebounds, 2.9 assists and 1.9 steals per game. He subsequently moved to New Zealand in May where he joined the Waikato Pistons for the 2007 New Zealand NBL season. In eight regular season games for the Pistons, Crowe averaged 20.3 points, 4.5 rebounds, 5.3 assists and a league-leading 3.8 steals per game. He also recorded 28 points, eight rebounds and seven steals in the Pistons' semi-final loss to the Nelson Giants.

Due to his impressive play in the New Zealand NBL, Crowe was nabbed by the Gold Coast Blaze of the Australian NBL for the 2007–08 season. He appeared in all 31 games for the Blaze in 2007–08, averaging 16.5 points, 6.3 rebounds and 5.4 assists per game. He returned to the Pistons for the 2008 New Zealand NBL season and had a career-best stint. His season began with a Waikato club record 16 assists in a win over the Nelson Giants, just hours after arriving from Los Angeles. He followed that up with three triple-doubles throughout the year, recording his first with 25 points, 11 rebounds and 12 assists against Taranaki in round three, his second with 30 points, 12 rebounds and 10 points against Wellington in round 10, and third against the Canterbury in round 12 with 44 points, 11 rebounds and 11 assists. He earned numerous awards for his efforts, garnering Most Outstanding Guard, Assist Champion, All-Star Five honors, was named Player of the Week five times, and ended the regular season atop the Player Power Rankings by a healthy margin. To cap off the season, he was named the league's Most Valuable Player and led the Pistons to the championship, winning the best-of-three Finals series 2–0 over the Wellington Saints. In 18 regular season games, he averaged 21.7 points, 7.2 rebounds, a league-leading 8.3 assists and 3.1 steals per game.

=== Latin America and Bulgaria ===
In January 2009, Crowe signed with Pioneros de Quintana Roo of the Liga Nacional de Baloncesto Profesional. The following month, he moved to Venezuela and joined Cocodrilos de Caracas, which again was a one-month stint. Later that year, he signed with Ukrainian team BC Dnipro for the 2009–10 season. In 30 games for Dnipro in 2009–10, he averaged 16.7 points, 5.7 rebounds, 7.7 assists and 2.2 steals per game.

In September 2010, Crowe signed with Levski Sofia of Bulgaria for the 2010–11 season. In 24 league games for Levski in 2010–11, he averaged 11.3 points, 4.7 rebounds, 5.6 assists and 2.4 steals per game.

=== Return to New Zealand ===
In May 2011, Crowe re-joined the Waikato Pistons for the rest of the 2011 New Zealand NBL season. In 12 regular season games, he averaged 13.2 points, 5.1 rebounds, a league-leading 7.2 assists and a league-leading 3.3 steals per game. The Pistons came into the semi-finals on an 11-game winning streak, but were defeated 95–86 in an upset win by the Hawke's Bay Hawks. Crowe scored 10 points in the loss. He earned All-Star Five honors for a second time, and was named Assist Champion for a second time also.

=== Final season ===
On September 29, 2011, Crowe signed with Phoenix Hagen of Germany for the 2011–12 season. However, he was released by the club in December 2011 after appearing in just nine games. In those nine games, he averaged career lows with 7.7 points, 3.9 rebounds, 2.9 assists and 1.4 steals per game.

In February 2012, Crowe signed with the Wellington Saints for the 2012 New Zealand NBL season. In 18 games for the Saints (16 regular season, 2 playoff), he averaged 17.3 points, 6.4 rebounds, 8.7 assists and 2.8 steals per game. Crowe was named Assist Champion for a third time, and guided his team to the Grand Final where they were defeated by the Auckland Pirates.

== Post-playing career ==
In June 2014, Crowe was named the head coach of the Verbum Dei High School basketball team. He has a son, Jason Crowe Jr., who is a top basketball recruit in the class of 2026.
