= 1985 New Zealand NBL season =

- League: New Zealand NBL
- Sport: Basketball
- Teams: 10

Regular season
- Minor premiers: Auckland
- Top scorer: Ronnie Joyner (Ponsonby)

Playoffs
- Champions: Wellington
- Runners-up: Auckland

New Zealand NBL seasons
- ← 1984 1986 →

The 1985 NBL season was the fourth season of the National Basketball League. Two new teams entered the league in 1985, expanding the number of teams from eight to ten. 1984 Conference Basketball League (CBL) champions New Plymouth were promoted to the NBL for the 1985 season, while 1984 CBL runners-up Palmerston North were readmitted to the league after being demoted following their last place finish in 1982.

The mid-1980s was considered the league's halcyon period, with Auckland, Canterbury and Wellington the benchmark teams. The 1985 Final was one of the league's most memorable, with Wellington and Auckland facing off against each other for the third straight year. The game was televised live and most were expecting Auckland to revenge their 1984 defeat after garnering two 20-point wins over Wellington during the regular season. The game was a thriller, having to be sent into overtime after the scores were locked at 100 a piece after four quarters. Saints legend Kenny McFadden went on to hit the winning three-point shot at the buzzer in the extra period to claim a 114–111 win and back-to-back championships.

== Final standings ==
#	Team
	Wellington
Silver medal	Auckland
3	Canterbury
4	Hamilton
5	Palmerston North
6	Nelson
7	Ponsonby
8	New Plymouth
9	Centrals
10	Napier

== Season awards ==
- Most Outstanding Guard: Tyrone Brown (Palmerston North)
- Most Outstanding NZ Guard: Tony Smith (Hamilton)
- Most Outstanding Forward: Ronnie Joyner (Ponsonby)
- Most Outstanding NZ Forward/Centre: Stan Hill (Auckland)
- Scoring Champion: Ronnie Joyner (Ponsonby)
- Rebounding Champion: Willie Burton (Palmerston North)
- Assist Champion: Kenny McFadden (Wellington)
- All-Star Five:
  - Tyrone Brown (Palmerston North)
  - Willie Burton (Palmerston North)
  - Stan Hill (Auckland)
  - Ronnie Joyner (Ponsonby)
  - Kenny McFadden (Wellington)
