= 2006 New Zealand NBL season =

- League: New Zealand NBL
- Sport: Basketball
- Duration: 26 March – 8 July
- Games: 18
- Teams: 10

Regular season
- Minor premiers: Auckland Stars
- Season MVP: Paora Winitana (Hawke's Bay Hawks)
- Top scorer: Dennis Trammell (Canterbury Rams)

Playoffs
- Champions: Hawke's Bay Hawks
- Runners-up: Auckland Stars
- Final MVP: Paora Winitana

New Zealand NBL seasons
- ← 2005 2007 →

The 2006 NBL season was the 25th season of the National Basketball League. The Hawke's Bay Hawks won the championship in 2006 to claim their first league title.

== Summary ==
=== Regular season standings ===
Pos
Pos	Team	W	L
1	Auckland Stars	16	2
2	Hawke's Bay Hawks	14	4
3	Nelson Giants	14	4
4	Wellington Saints	12	6
5	Manawatu Jets	8	10
6	Harbour Heat	7	11
7	Canterbury Rams	6	12
8	Taranaki Mountainairs	6	12
9	Waikato Pistons	4	14
10	Otago Nuggets	3	15

=== Playoff bracket ===
Semi-finals
1	Auckland Stars	85
4	Wellington Saints	79
2	Hawke's Bay Hawks	88
3	Nelson Giants	82

Final
Auckland Stars	69
Hawke's Bay Hawks	84

== Awards ==
=== Player of the Week ===
Round	Player	Team	Ref
1	Stacey Lambert	Manawatu Jets	
2	Eric Freeman	Nelson Giants	
3	Tony Rampton	Taranaki Mountainairs	
4	Ben Hill	Waikato Pistons	
5	Link Abrams	Taranaki Mountainairs	
6	Mika Vukona	Nelson Giants	
7	Brad Davidson	Manawatu Jets	
8	Branduinn Fullove	Otago Nuggets	
9	Eric Freeman	Nelson Giants	
10	Josh Pace	Nelson Giants	
11	Casey Frank	Auckland Stars	
12	Dillon Boucher	Auckland Stars	
13	Terrence Lewis	Wellington Saints	

=== Statistics leaders ===
Stats as of the end of the regular season

Category	Player	Team	Stat
Points per game	Dennis Trammell	Canterbury Rams	25.6
Rebounds per game	Miles Pearce	Otago Nuggets	11.9
Assists per game	Brad Davidson	Manawatu Jets	4.8
Steals per game	Dillon Boucher	Auckland Stars	2.9
Blocks per game	Casey Frank	Auckland Stars	2.0

=== Regular season ===
- Most Valuable Player: Paora Winitana (Hawke's Bay Hawks)
- NZ Most Valuable Player: Casey Frank (Auckland Stars)
- Most Outstanding Guard: Paora Winitana (Hawke's Bay Hawks)
- Most Outstanding NZ Guard: Paora Winitana (Hawke's Bay Hawks)
- Most Outstanding Forward: Casey Frank (Auckland Stars)
- Most Outstanding NZ Forward/Centre: Casey Frank (Auckland Stars)
- Scoring Champion: Dennis Trammell (Canterbury Rams)
- Rebounding Champion: Miles Pearce (Otago Nuggets)
- Assist Champion: Brad Davidson (Manawatu Jets)
- Rookie of the Year: Shaun Tilby (Otago Nuggets)
- Coach of the Year: Nenad Vučinić (Nelson Giants)
- All-Star Five:
  - G: Lindsay Tait (Auckland Stars)
  - G: Paora Winitana (Hawke's Bay Hawks)
  - F: Josh Pace (Nelson Giants)
  - F: Casey Frank (Auckland Stars)
  - C: Nick Horvath (Wellington Saints)

=== Playoffs ===
- Final MVP: Paora Winitana (Hawke's Bay Hawks)
