= 1987 New Zealand NBL season =

- League: New Zealand NBL
- Sport: Basketball
- Number of teams: 10

Regular season
- Minor premiers: Canterbury
- Top scorer: Ronnie Joyner (Ponsonby)

Playoffs
- Champions: Wellington
- Runners-up: Canterbury

New Zealand NBL seasons
- ← 1986 1988 →

The 1987 NBL season was the sixth season of the National Basketball League. Only one change occurred heading into the 1987 season, with Hamilton now called Waikato. Wellington won the championship in 1987 to claim their third league title.

== Final standings ==
#	Team
	Wellington
Silver medal	Canterbury
3	North Shore
4	New Plymouth
5	Auckland
6	Ponsonby
7	Hawke's Bay
8	Waikato
9	Nelson
10	Palmerston North

== Season awards ==
- Most Outstanding Guard: Tony Webster (North Shore)
- Most Outstanding NZ Guard: Tony Smith (North Shore)
- Most Outstanding Forward: Frank Smith (Nelson)
- Most Outstanding NZ Forward/Centre: Glen Denham (Waikato)
- Scoring Champion: Ronnie Joyner (Ponsonby)
- Rebounding Champion: Willie Burton (Hawke's Bay)
- Assist Champion: Kenny McFadden (Wellington)
- Young Player of the Year: Glen Denham (Waikato)
- All-Star Five:
  - Willie Burton (Hawke's Bay)
  - Keith Colbert (Auckland)
  - Clyde Huntley (Canterbury)
  - Frank Smith (Nelson)
  - Tony Webster (North Shore)
