= Rodney Green Arenas =

Arena in Taradale, Napier, New Zealand

Coordinates: 39°32′48″S 176°50′30″E

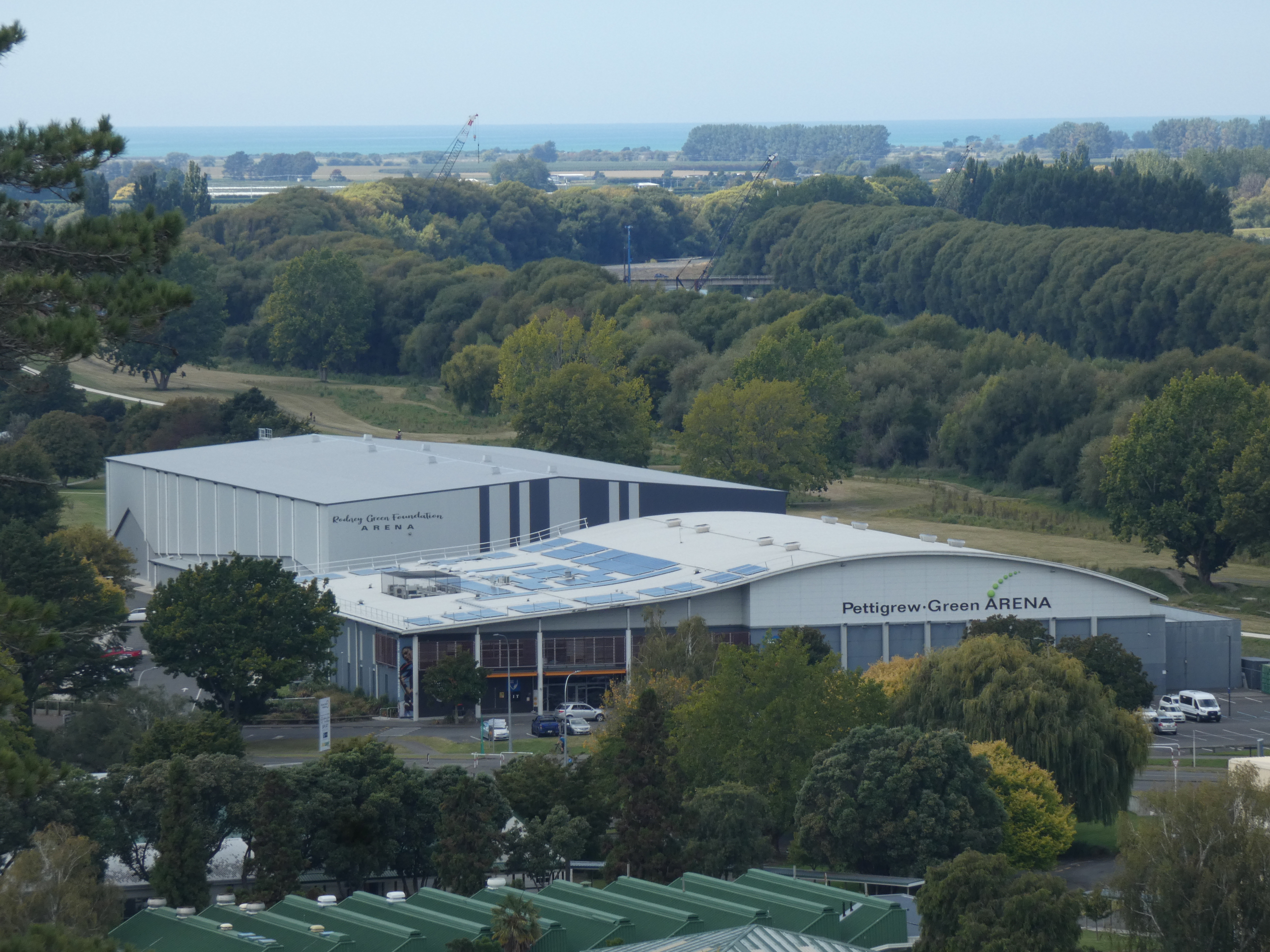
- The arenas in 2026
- Interactive map of Rodney Green Arenas

Pettigrew Green Arena (PGA) and Rodney Green Foundation Arena (RGFA), collectively Rodney Green Arenas, are multi-purpose indoor sports and entertainment centres in Taradale, a suburb of Napier in New Zealand.

The PGA opened in April 2003. It regularly hosts volleyball, basketball and netball matches for Hawke's Bay representative teams. The main court has a capacity of 2,500. It is owned by the Regional Indoor Sports and Events Centre Trust.

The PGA is home to the Hawke's Bay Hawks basketball team. It hosted an ANZ Championship netball match for the Central Pulse against the Adelaide Thunderbirds in Round 14 of the 2008 season.

In February 2023, the $20 million RGFA was opened next to the existing PGA.
