= John Welch (basketball) =

American basketball player and coach

Fresno State Bulldogs
- Title: Associate head coach
- League: Pac-12

Personal information
- Born: February 17, 1963 (age 63) Portland, Maine, U.S.

Career information
- High school: Rancho (North Las Vegas, Nevada)
- College: Nevada (1982–1984); UNLV (1985–1986)
- NBA draft: 1986: undrafted
- Position: Guard
- Coaching career: 1986–present

Career history

Coaching
- 1986–1989: UNLV (graduate assistant)
- 1993–1995: Long Beach State (assistant)
- 1995–2002: Fresno State (assistant)
- 2002–2005: Memphis Grizzlies (assistant)
- 2005–2013: Denver Nuggets (assistant)
- 2013–2015: Brooklyn Nets (assistant)
- 2015–2016: Sacramento Kings (assistant)
- 2016–2020: Los Angeles Clippers (assistant)
- 2022: Ostioneros de Guaymas
- 2023–2024: Kentucky (assistant)
- 2024–present: Fresno State (associate HC)

Career highlights
- As player: New Zealand League Most Outstanding Guard (1988); New Zealand League All-Star Five (1988); As assistant coach: Mountain West Conference Tournament champion (2000)

John Welch (born February 17, 1963) is an American professional basketball coach and former player who is the associate head coach at Fresno State. He previously served as assistant coach for the Los Angeles Clippers of the National Basketball Association (NBA). He played professionally in New Zealand where in 1988, he earned Most Outstanding Guard and All-Star Five honors playing for Waitemata. Throughout his coaching career, he has worked with or worked under various notable basketball people, including Jerry Tarkanian, Jerry West, Hubie Brown, George Karl and Tim Grgurich.

== Early life ==
Born in Portland, Maine, Welch attended Rancho High School in North Las Vegas, Nevada and was an All-State selection. He later played college basketball for Nevada and UNLV before starting a successful coaching career.

== Coaching career ==
=== Fresno State ===
At Fresno State, Welch worked under head coach Jerry Tarkanian, a 2013 Naismith Memorial Basketball Hall of Fame coach inductee.

=== Denver Nuggets ===
Welch worked under George Karl during his tenure with the Denver Nuggets. Karl expressed his appreciation towards Welch, saying, "he's got great passion ... [and] tries something every day that we can get better at."

=== Brooklyn Nets ===
Welch began his tenure with the Nets in 2013, the first season Jason Kidd was head coach.

=== Sacramento Kings ===
On July 31, 2015, Welch was hired by the Sacramento Kings to be an assistant coach.

=== Los Angeles Clippers ===
On September 23, 2016, Welch was hired as an assistant coach by the Los Angeles Clippers, and served in the position until November 16, 2020.

=== Ostioneros de Guaymas ===
On February 22, 2022, Welch was hired as the head coach of the Ostioneros de Guaymas, a Mexican team in the Circuito de Baloncesto de la Costa del Pacífico (CIBACOPA).

=== Kentucky ===
On May 22, 2023, Welch was hired as an assistant coach by the Kentucky Wildcats.
