= Dion Prewster =

American-New Zealand basketball player

Free agent
- Position: Shooting guard / small forward

Personal information
- Born: 10 January 1990 (age 36) Santa Ana, California, U.S.
- Listed height: 195 cm (6 ft 5 in)
- Listed weight: 96 kg (212 lb)

Career information
- High school: Wellington College (Wellington, New Zealand); Iowa City (Iowa City, Iowa)
- College: San Jacinto College (2008–2010); Stephen F. Austin (2010–2011)
- NBA draft: 2012: undrafted
- Playing career: 2011–2022
- Coaching career: 2023–present

Career history

Playing
- 2011: Wellington Saints
- 2011–2012: New Zealand Breakers
- 2012: Southland Sharks
- 2013: Hawke's Bay Hawks
- 2014–2016: Wellington Saints
- 2015–2017: Sydney Kings
- 2017: Nelson Giants
- 2017–2018: Paderborn Baskets
- 2018–2019: Hawke's Bay Hawks
- 2021: Wellington Saints
- 2021–2022: Melbourne United
- 2022: Sandringham Sabres
- 2024: Wellington Saints

Coaching
- 2023–2026: Shimane Susanoo Magic (assistant)

Career highlights
- NBL champion (2012); 4× NZNBL champion (2011, 2014, 2016, 2021); NZNBL MVP (2021); NZNBL All-Star Five (2021); NZNBL Most Outstanding Guard (2021); NZNBL Most Outstanding Kiwi Guard (2021); NZNBL Defensive Player of the Year (2021)

Dion Anthony Prewster (born 10 January 1990) is an American-born New Zealand basketball player who last played for the Wellington Saints of the New Zealand National Basketball League (NZNBL). He played college basketball for San Jacinto College and Stephen F. Austin State University. He served as an assistant coach of the Shimane Susanoo Magic in the Japanese B.League during the 2023–24 season.

== Early life ==
Prewster was born in Santa Ana, California, to an African-American father and a Samoan mother. He was raised by his mother in American Samoa and spent time in Hawaii before moving to Wellington when he was seven. He grew up in the suburb of Johnsonville and attended Wellington College, before moving to the United States for his senior year of high school. He enrolled at Iowa City High School in Iowa City, Iowa, where he led his team to the Class 4A state championship in 2007–08.

== College career ==
As a freshman at San Jacinto College in 2008–09, Prewster averaged 8.9 points, 9.0 rebounds and 1.8 blocks per game in helping the basketball team to a 25–5 record and the ETJCC South Division title. As a sophomore in 2009–10, he earned first-team All-ETJCC and All-Region XIV honors after averaging 14.3 points, 11.8 rebounds, 3.0 assists and 2.0 blocks per game.

On 6 May 2010, Prewster transferred to Stephen F. Austin State University. As a junior for SFA in 2010–11, he averaged 5.1 points, 3.1 rebounds and 1.2 assists in 29 games with three starts.

On 20 April 2011, Prewster transferred again, this time to Truman State University.

== Professional career ==
In 2011, Prewster debuted in the New Zealand NBL for the Wellington Saints. He was a member of the Saints' championship-winning team in his first year.

For the 2011–12 season, Prewster decided against returning to the United States and instead signed with the New Zealand Breakers of the Australian NBL. He appeared in 12 games for the Breakers in 2011–12, and in April 2012, he was a member of the Breakers' championship-winning squad.

For the 2012 New Zealand NBL season, Prewster joined the Southland Sharks. In 12 games, he averaged 8.8 points and 5.4 rebounds per game. The following year, he played for the Hawke's Bay Hawks and averaged 13.6 points, 6.4 rebounds, 2.1 assists and 1.0 steals in 16 games. He returned to the Wellington Saints in 2014 and averaged 8.7 points, 4.0 rebounds and 1.3 assists in 20 games, while winning his second New Zealand NBL championship. With the Saints in 2015, he averaged a career-high 14.3 points, 4.3 rebounds and 2.0 assists in 20 games.

On 24 August 2015, Prewster signed with the Sydney Kings for the 2015–16 NBL season. On 7 November 2015, he scored a season-high 12 points against the Adelaide 36ers. He appeared in 28 games for the Kings, averaging 3.4 points and 2.5 rebounds per game.

Prewster returned to the Wellington Saints for a third season in 2016. In the Saints' regular season finale on 29 May, Prewster scored 40 points in 21 minutes off the bench in a 120–72 win over the Hawke's Bay Hawks. He subsequently earned Player of the Week honors for Round 12. The Saints went on to win the championship, with Prewster winning his third title.

Prewster returned to the Sydney Kings for the 2016–17 NBL season, and in 14 games averaged 1.1 points.

For the 2017 New Zealand NBL season, Prewster joined the Nelson Giants.

In November 2017, Prewster signed with Paderborn Baskets of the German ProA. In 21 games, he averaged 7.2 points, 3.1 rebounds and 1.6 assists per game.

In April 2018, Prewster joined the Hawke's Bay Hawks for the 2018 New Zealand NBL season. In October 2018, he re-signed with the Hawks for the 2019 season.

In February 2020, Prewster signed with the Wellington Saints for the 2020 New Zealand NBL season, returning to the franchise for a third stint. However, the Saints withdrew from the 2020 season due to the COVID-19 pandemic. In November 2020, he re-signed with the Saints for the 2021 season. For the season, he was named league MVP, Most Outstanding Guard, Most Outstanding NZ Guard, Defensive Player of the Year and All-Star Five. The Saints' semi-final against the Auckland Huskies on 22 July 2021, Prewster recorded 12 points, 10 rebounds and 10 assists in a 99–73 win.

On 20 July 2021, Prewster signed with Melbourne United for the 2021–22 NBL season.

In February 2022, Prewster signed with the Sandringham Sabres of the NBL1 South for the 2022 NBL1 season.

On 23 May 2024, Prewster signed with the Wellington Saints for the rest of the 2024 New Zealand NBL season.

== National team career ==
Prewster captained the Junior Tall Blacks at the 2009 FIBA Under-19 World Championship, where he averaged 10.4 points, 6.6. rebounds and 1.2 assists per game.

In July 2015, Prewster earned his first Tall Blacks squad selection for their European tour, Stanković Cup campaign, and 2015 FIBA Oceania Championship campaign. He made his FIBA Oceania Championship debut on 18 August in Game 2 of their two-game series loss to Australia, appearing in the final 29 seconds of the match.

In February 2020, Prewster played for the Tall Blacks against Guam in the 2021 FIBA Asia Cup qualifiers.

In 2022, Prewster played for the Tall Blacks in the 2023 FIBA World Cup Asian Qualifiers. He returned to the Tall Blacks for further qualifiers in 2024.

== Coaching career ==
In 2022, Prewster joined the support staff of the Shimane Susanoo Magic in the Japanese B.League. The following year, he was elevated to an assistant coach role by head coach Paul Henare. He parted ways with Shimane Susanoo Magic following the 2025–26 season.

== Personal life ==
Off the court, Prewster earned his degree in teaching.
