= 2007 New Zealand NBL season =

- League: New Zealand NBL
- Sport: Basketball
- Duration: 8 March – 29 June
- Games: 18
- Teams: 10

Regular season
- Minor premiers: Harbour Heat
- Season MVP: Josh Pace (Nelson Giants)
- Top scorer: Garry Hill-Thomas (Taranaki Mountainairs)

Playoffs
- Champions: Nelson Giants
- Runners-up: Hawke's Bay Hawks

New Zealand NBL seasons
- ← 2006 2008 →

The 2007 NBL season was the 26th season of the National Basketball League. The Nelson Giants won the championship in 2007 to claim their third league title.

== Summary ==
=== Regular season standings ===
Pos
| Pos | Team | W | L |
|---|---|---|---|
| 1 | Harbour Heat | 14 | 4 |
| 2 | Waikato Pistons | 13 | 5 |
| 3 | Nelson Giants | 13 | 5 |
| 4 | Hawke's Bay Hawks | 12 | 6 |
| 5 | Auckland Stars | 11 | 7 |
| 6 | Wellington Saints | 9 | 9 |
| 7 | Taranaki Mountainairs | 8 | 10 |
| 8 | Canterbury Rams | 4 | 14 |
| 9 | Manawatu Jets | 4 | 14 |
| 10 | Otago Nuggets | 2 | 16 |

=== Playoff bracket ===
Semi-finals
1 | Harbour Heat | 76
4 | Hawke's Bay Hawks | 85
2 | Waikato Pistons | 103
3 | Nelson Giants | 109

Finals
Hawke's Bay Hawks | 67 | 83 | X
Nelson Giants | 76 | 96 | X

== Awards ==
=== Statistics leaders ===
Stats as of the end of the regular season

| Category | Player | Team | Stat |
|---|---|---|---|
| Points per game | Garry Hill-Thomas | Taranaki Mountainairs | 26.2 |
| Rebounds per game | Link Abrams | Taranaki Mountainairs | 11.5 |
| Assists per game | Paul Henare | Hawke's Bay Hawks | 6.4 |
| Steals per game | Jason Crowe | Waikato Pistons | 3.8 |
| Blocks per game | Warren Byrd | Manawatu Jets | 1.6 |

=== Regular season ===
- Most Valuable Player: Josh Pace (Nelson Giants)
- NZ Most Valuable Player: Link Abrams (Taranaki Mountainairs) & Paora Winitana (Hawke's Bay Hawks)
- Most Outstanding Guard: Josh Pace (Nelson Giants)
- Most Outstanding NZ Guard: Hayden Allen (Harbour Heat) & Lindsay Tait (Auckland Stars)
- Most Outstanding Forward: Link Abrams (Taranaki Mountainairs)
- Most Outstanding NZ Forward/Centre: Link Abrams (Taranaki Mountainairs)
- Scoring Champion: Garry Hill-Thomas (Taranaki Mountainairs)
- Rebounding Champion: Link Abrams (Taranaki Mountainairs)
- Assist Champion: Paul Henare (Hawke's Bay Hawks)
- Rookie of the Year: Charlie Piho (Auckland Stars)
- Coach of the Year: John Dorge (Harbour Heat)
- All-Star Five:
  - G: Lindsay Tait (Auckland Stars)
  - G: Josh Pace (Nelson Giants)
  - F: Dillon Boucher (Auckland Stars)
  - F: Oscar Forman (Harbour Heat)
  - C: Link Abrams (Taranaki Mountainairs)
