= Aaron Cook Jr. =

American basketball player (born 1997)

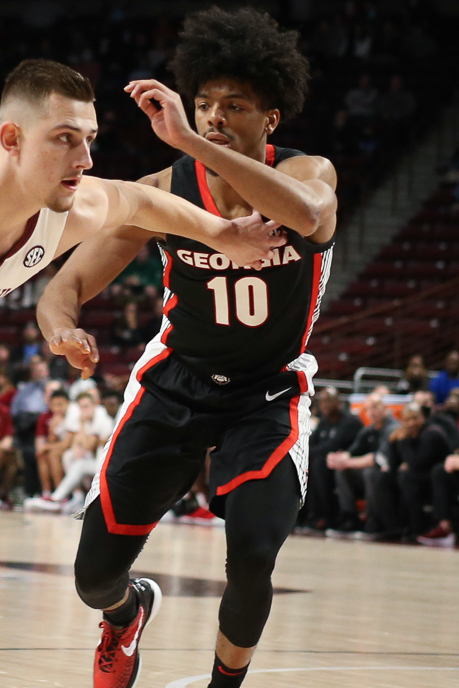
- Cook in 2022

No. 0 – Taranaki Airs
- Position: Point guard
- League: NZNBL

Personal information
- Born: December 28, 1997 (age 28) St. Louis, Missouri, U.S.
- Listed height: 6 ft 2 in (1.88 m)
- Listed weight: 185 lb (84 kg)

Career information
- High school: Westminster Christian Academy (Town and Country, Missouri)
- College: Southern Illinois (2016–2020); Gonzaga (2020–2021); Georgia (2021–2022)
- NBA draft: 2022: undrafted
- Playing career: 2022–present

Career history
- 2022–2023: Enosis Neon Paralimni
- 2023: Nevėžis Kėdainiai
- 2023: Peja
- 2023–2024: Eisbären Bremerhaven
- 2024–2025: ZZ Leiden
- 2026–present: Taranaki Airs

Career highlights
- Dutch Supercup winner (2024); Cypriot League All-Star (2023)

Aaron Cook Jr. (born December 28, 1997) is an American professional basketball player for the Taranaki Airs of the New Zealand National Basketball League (NZNBL). He played college basketball for the Southern Illinois Salukis, Gonzaga Bulldogs, and Georgia Bulldogs.

== High school career ==
Cook grew up in St. Louis, Missouri, and attended Westminster Christian Academy in nearby Town and Country. As a junior, he averaged over 16 points per game and led his team to a 24–6 record and a district championship. In his senior year, he finished with the sixth-highest scoring average in St. Louis with 22.1 points per game. He helped his team finish 24–6 and was named First Team All-Metro by the St. Louis Post-Dispatch. Cook was not heavily recruited out of high school. On October 2, 2015, he verbally committed to play college basketball at Southern Illinois over offers from Liberty, South Dakota State, Ohio, Eastern Illinois, Central Michigan, and Jacksonville State.

== College career ==
=== Southern Illinois ===
Coming into his freshman season, Cook missed some time with a torn labrum. As a freshman, Cook played in 32 of SIU's 33 games, playing backup point guard and averaged 3.0 points and 0.9 assists in 10.6 minutes of play. On January 24, 2018, Cook scored a career-high 25 points in an 82–77 win versus Indiana State. On February 14, he sank the game-winning free throws with 4.1 seconds remaining in an 81–80 overtime win against Missouri State. As a sophomore, Cook averaged 9.8 points and 2.7 assists per game. Cook started 32 of 33 games, led the team in 3-point shooting percentage at 38.4 percent, tied Marcus Bartley for the team lead with 90 assists, and finished with 47 steals. He was named to the MVC Most-Improved Team as well as the MVC All-Academic Second-Team. Cook scored a junior season-high 23 points on December 8, in an 83–73 victory over Southeast Missouri State. In his junior year, Cook started every game, averaging 10.5 points and 3.7 assists per game, and was named to the MVC Scholar-Athlete Second Team. As a senior, Cook played in just six games before breaking his right hand in a loss to Murray State. Despite initially being ruled out for four to six weeks, Cook took a medical redshirt and missed the remainder of the season. Cook was leading the Salukis in scoring (15.0 points per game) and assists (3.3 per game) before he was sidelined with the injury, and he was named to the Sunshine Slam All-Tournament team.

=== Gonzaga ===
On April 7, 2020, Cook announced that he was transferring to Gonzaga for his redshirt senior season. He chose the Bulldogs over offers from DePaul, Arkansas and Santa Clara. Cook averaged 4.2 points, 1.7 assists and 1.6 rebounds per game.

=== Georgia ===
On May 24, 2021, Cook announced he was transferring to Georgia, taking advantage on an additional season of eligibility granted by the NCAA due to the COVID-19 pandemic. On November 16, he scored 22 points in a 76–60 victory over South Carolina State and surpassed the 1,000-point threshold. Cook averaged 10.5 points, 5.4 assists, 2.7 rebounds, and 1.4 steals per game.

== Professional career ==
On September 29, 2022, Cook signed his first professional contract with Enosis Neon Paralimni of the Cypriot League. In 19 games, he averaged 16.7 points, 3.9 rebounds, 5.4 assists and 1.6 steals per game. In March 2023, he joined Nevėžis Kėdainiai of the Lithuanian Basketball League for the rest of the season. In 12 games, he averaged 5.7 points, 1.7 rebounds and 2.8 assists per game.

On August 22, 2023, Cook signed with KB Peja of the Kosovo Basketball Superleague. He left after appearing in five league games and three FIBA Europe Cup games. On November 10, 2023, he signed with Eisbären Bremerhaven of the German ProA. In 26 games, he averaged 12.6 points, 3.1 rebounds, 5.3 assists and 1.6 steals per game.

In July 2024, Cook signed with ZZ Leiden of the BNXT League. In 36 games during the 2024–25 season, he averaged 10.9 points, 2.1 rebounds, 4.6 assists and 1.6 steals per game. He also appeared in nine DBL games, averaging 9.2 points, 2.8 rebounds, 5.8 assists and 2.0 steals per game.

In February 2026, Cook signed with the Taranaki Airs of the New Zealand National Basketball League (NZNBL) for the 2026 season.

== Career statistics ==
Legend
GP	Games played	GS	Games started	MPG	Minutes per game
FG%	Field goal percentage	3P%	3-point field goal percentage	FT%	Free throw percentage
RPG	Rebounds per game	APG	Assists per game	SPG	Steals per game
BPG	Blocks per game	PPG	Points per game	**Bold**	Career high

=== College ===
Year	Team	GP	GS	MPG	FG%	3P%	FT%	RPG	APG	SPG	BPG	PPG
2016–17	Southern Illinois	32	0	10.6	.333	.185	**.776**	.8	.9	1.0	**.3**	3.0
2017–18	Southern Illinois	**33**	**32**	30.0	.439	**.384**	.696	2.3	2.7	1.4	**.3**	9.8
2018–19	Southern Illinois	32	**32**	**32.8**	.396	.348	.651	2.4	3.7	1.3	**.3**	10.5
2019–20	Southern Illinois	6	6	31.2	**.552**	.273	.591	**3.0**	3.3	**3.2**	.2	**15.0**
2020–21	Gonzaga	30	1	13.4	.500	.350	.657	1.6	1.7	.9	.1	4.2
2021–22	Georgia	31	31	32.2	.381	.282	.705	2.7	**5.4**	1.4	.2	10.5
Career		164	102	24.2	.415	.326	.686	2.0	2.9	1.4	.2	7.9

== Personal life ==
Cook is the son of Aaron Cook Sr. and Regina Cook. His father was a star basketball player at Jennings High in suburban St. Louis and is in that school's athletic hall of fame. From there, his father matriculated to what is now known as Harris-Stowe State University, where he was a four-year starter for the Hornets in the NAIA (small-college classification). Aaron Cook Jr's grandfather, Jimmie Cook, was an immensely successful high school coach in St. Louis, leading the McKinley High Goldbugs to the 1982 Missouri Class 2A boys state basketball title. As of November 2026 he now coaches girls basketball at Duchesne High School in St. Charles Missouri
