= 1998 New Zealand NBL season =

- League: New Zealand NBL
- Sport: Basketball
- Teams: 11

Regular season
- Minor premiers: Nelson
- Top scorer: Ronnie Joyner (Northland)

Playoffs
- Champions: Nelson
- Runners-up: North Harbour

New Zealand NBL seasons
- ← 1997 1999 →

The 1998 NBL season was the 17th season of the National Basketball League. Nelson won the championship in 1998 to claim their second league title. They defeated North Harbour 81–73 in the final on 12 September. A mid-season game between Canterbury and Northland produced the highest ever scoreline in league history, with Canterbury recording a 179–124 win. Northland also became the first team in league history to record a winless campaign.

== Final standings ==
#	Team
	Nelson
Silver medal	North Harbour
3	Canterbury
4	Auckland
5	Wellington
6	Taranaki
7	Palmerston North
8	Otago
9	Waikato
10	Hawke's Bay
11	Northland

== Season awards ==
- NZ Most Valuable Player: Phill Jones (Nelson)
- Most Outstanding Guard: Phill Jones (Nelson)
- Most Outstanding NZ Guard: Phill Jones (Nelson)
- Most Outstanding Forward: Pero Cameron (Auckland)
- Most Outstanding NZ Forward/Centre: Pero Cameron (Auckland)
- Scoring Champion: Ronnie Joyner (Northland)
- Rebounding Champion: Robert Wilson (Hawke's Bay)
- Assist Champion: Mark Dickel (Wellington)
- Rookie of the Year: Kirk Penney (North Harbour)
- Coach of the Year: Nenad Vučinić (Nelson)
- All-Star Five:
  - G: Joe Wyatt (Nelson)
  - G: Phill Jones (Nelson)
  - F: Darryl Johnson (Wellington)
  - F: DeWayne McCray (Wellington)
  - C: Pero Cameron (Auckland)
