= Pāora Winitana =

New Zealand basketball player (born 1976)

Personal information
- Born: 6 December 1976 (age 49) Hastings, New Zealand
- Listed height: 195 cm (6 ft 5 in)
- Listed weight: 98 kg (216 lb)

Career information
- High school: Hastings Boys' (Hastings, New Zealand); Church College (Hamilton, New Zealand)
- Playing career: 1996–2016
- Position: Shooting guard

Career history
- 1996–1998: North Harbour Vikings/Kings
- 2001: North Harbour Kings
- 2001: Hawke's Bay Hawks
- 2002: Harbour Kings
- 2003–2008: Hawke's Bay Hawks
- 2003–2004: New Zealand Breakers
- 2007–2008: New Zealand Breakers
- 2008–2009: Adelaide 36ers
- 2009–2010: Christchurch Cougars
- 2011–2016: Hawke's Bay Hawks

Career highlights
- NZNBL champion (2006); NZNBL MVP (2006); 2× NZNBL All-Star Five (2006, 2012); NZNBL Rookie of the Year (1996)
Medals
Men's basketball
Representing New Zealand
Commonwealth Games
Silver medal – second place	2006 Melbourne	Team competition

Paul Ramiha "Pāora" Winitana (born 6 December 1976) is a New Zealand former professional basketball player who played the majority of his career in the New Zealand National Basketball League (NZNBL) for the Hawke's Bay Hawks. He was ordained as a Mormon bishop in 2005 and chooses not to play basketball on Sundays.

== Early life ==
Winitana was born in Hastings, New Zealand.

== High school ==
Winitana attended Hastings Boys' High School and played for the school's A1 team in 1994 where he scored a New Zealand secondary school record for points scored in a single game against Central Hawke's Bay where he scored 96 points. In 1995, he attended the Church College of New Zealand and helped his team defeat Palmerston North Boys High in the National secondary school boys final. He was selected to the all-tournament team, and was chosen to play as one of the top ten high school players in the country against the country's top ten second division players; his team lost the match but he was awarded the game MVP.

== Professional career ==
In 1996, Winitana played his first year of professional basketball for the North Harbour Vikings and won the NZNBL Rookie of the Year award. After demonstrating his world-class potential in the NZNBL, Winitana was offered several opportunities to play basketball in the United States, including a full scholarship to the University of Wisconsin, Brigham Young University, Ohio State University, and several others. But he turned them down to go on a two-year mission for the Church of Jesus Christ of Latter-Day Saints. The mission also meant that he missed out on the chance to represent New Zealand at the 2000 Sydney Olympic Games.

In 2001, Winitana returned to the NZNBL and played for the North Harbour Kings (one game) and the Hawke's Bay Hawks (nine games).

In 2002, Winitana was selected to the Tall Blacks squad, making his international basketball debut for New Zealand. He played for the Tall Blacks in the 2002 FIBA World Championships where they came fourth – New Zealand's highest ever placing. He also played for the Harbour Kings in 2002 and averaged 16.7 points in 15 games.

In 2003, Winitana returned to his hometown Hawke's Bay Hawks and after averaging 20 points per game in 17 games, he was signed by the New Zealand Breakers for the club's inaugural season in the Australian NBL. He continued to play for the Hawke's Bay Hawks in the coming years and led his team to the 2006 NZNBL championship in 2006 while garnering the league MVP award.

In 2007, Winitana re-joined the New Zealand Breakers for the 2007–08 NBL season. The following season, he played for the Adelaide 36ers. In 74 ANBL games over three seasons, Winitana averaged 3.6 points and 1.5 rebounds per game.

In 2009, Winitana moved to the Christchurch Cougars and played two seasons for them before returning to the Hawks in 2011. After the Hawks started the 2015 season with a 4-8 win/loss record, the club released coach Liam Flynn from his head coaching duties and replaced him with Winitana, already the team's co-captain alongside Jarrod Kenny. He returned to the Hawks for the 2016 season, but relinquished the captaincy role. Coming into the 2017 season, Winitana was not retained by the Hawks. He ended his career with 304 NBL games, which is ranked eighth all-time. He had his jersey retired by the Hawks on 13 May 2017.

== National team career ==
Winitana played for the Tall Blacks at the 2002 FIBA World Championship, the 2004 Summer Olympics in Athens, the 2006 Commonwealth Games in Melbourne, and the 2006 FIBA World Championship.

== Personal ==
Winitana and his wife Tia have six children. His son, also named Pāora, plays for BYU Cougars in NCAA Division I.
