= Stan Hill =

New Zealand basketball player

Stan Hill MNZM
Personal information
- Born: 1955 (age 70–71) Christchurch, New Zealand

Career information
- High school: St Andrew's College, Christchurch
- College: San Jose State (1955-1959)

Stanley Alan Hill MNZM (born 1955) is a New Zealand former basketball player who was captain of the New Zealand men's national basketball team, known as the "Tall Blacks", for nine years.

== Early life ==
Hill was born in Christchurch, of Māori descent. His father was Stanley Frank "Tiny" Hill, who represented the New Zealand national rugby union team from 1955 to 1959, including two matches as captain.

Hill played rugby for the St Andrew's College 1st XV, and also represented the school in basketball. He also played basketball for Burnham in the Christchurch club competition.

== Basketball career ==
Hill, who was 2.08 metres (6 ft 10 in) tall, played for the San Jose State University basketball team in NCAA Division I men's basketball between 1976 and 1978, scoring 489 points in his two seasons there. Rather than stay in the US and try for NBA, he chose to play professionally in England.

Hill was chosen for the Tall Blacks as a 17-year-old by the coach Steve McKean and played for the national team for 14 years, including nine years as captain. In 1978, he led New Zealand to a historic first victory over Australia (67–65), coached by McKean. Later that year, the Tall Blacks won the silver medal at the Commonwealth championships in Britain.

Hill represented New Zealand at the 1983 Kirin World Invitation Tournament in Japan, which New Zealand won, and was named the MVP. He also played for his country in the 1986 FIBA World Championship.

While playing in New Zealand's National Basketball League, Hill won many awards including:

- New Zealand NBL All-Star Five member in the inaugural 1982 season, 1983 and 1985
- 1982 New Zealand NBL Scoring Champion
- 1982 New Zealand NBL Most Outstanding Forward Award
- 1985 New Zealand NBL Most Outstanding Kiwi Forward/Centre Award

Hill later coached at NBL level and was assistant coach of the Tall Blacks with Keith Mair.

In 2017, Hill was inducted into the New Zealand Basketball Hall of Fame He was also inducted into the New Zealand Sports Hall of Fame in 1995.

Hill was honoured by the inception of the Stan Hill Award for NBL players. This award, which Hill himself won in 1985, is given to the best performing small forward, power forward or centre in the NBL.

In the 2000 New Year Honours, Hill was appointed a Member of the New Zealand Order of Merit, for services to basketball.

== Personal life ==
Hill's younger brother, John, also played basketball for New Zealand.

Hill's wife Mandy Purnell played for the New Zealand women's national basketball team, the "Tall Ferns", and their sons Ben and Oliver played in the NBL. Ben played for the Manawatu Jets, Waikato Pistons and Bay Hawks as well as the Tall Blacks. Oliver played for the Nelson Giants.

As of 2009, Hill had been running the Coromandel Hotel in Coromandel, New Zealand, for six years.
