= Kenny McFadden =

New Zealand basketball player and coach (1960–2022)

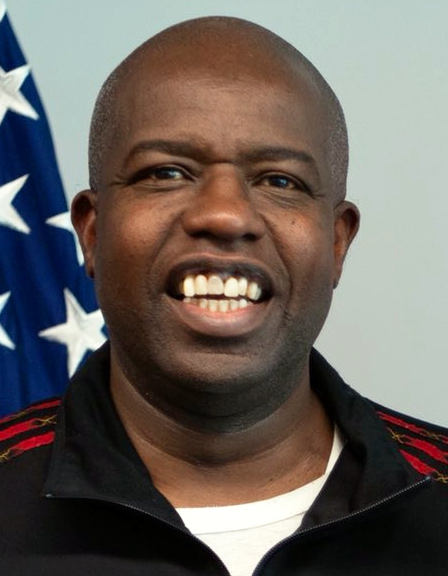
- McFadden in 2018

Personal information
- Born: 18 August 1960 U.S.
- Died: 24 March 2022 (aged 61) Wellington, New Zealand
- Listed height: 6 ft 2 in (1.88 m)

Career information
- High school: Sexton (Lansing, Michigan)
- College: Lorain CC (1978–1980); Washington State (1980–1982)
- NBA draft: 1982: undrafted
- Playing career: 1982–1996
- Position: Guard
- Number: 5
- Coaching career: 2010–2021

Career history

Playing
- 1982–1996: Wellington Saints

Coaching
- 2010–2011, 2019, 2021: Wellington Saints (assistant)

Career highlights
- As player: 4× NBL champion (1984, 1985, 1987, 1988); CBL champion (1982); 4× NBL All-Star Five (1983–1985, 1988); 2× NBL Most Outstanding Guard (1983, 1984); 2× NBL scoring champion (1983, 1984); 3× NBL assist champion (1985, 1987, 1991); No. 5 jersey retired by Wellington Saints; As assistant coach: 4× NBL champion (2010, 2011, 2019, 2021)

Kenneth Duane McFadden (18 August 1960 – 24 March 2022) was an American basketball player and coach. Born in the United States, he moved to New Zealand in 1982, where he played 15 seasons for the Wellington Saints and won four NBL championships. He was instrumental in developing and coaching young basketball players in New Zealand for over 40 years.

== Early life and college ==
McFadden grew up in East Lansing, Michigan, and attended J. W. Sexton High School. He planned to attend Kentucky State University in 1978 but he instead enrolled at Lorain County Community College where he played basketball for two seasons. McFadden played two seasons of college basketball for Washington State University between 1980 and 1982.

== Professional career ==
McFadden moved to New Zealand in 1982 to play for the Wellington Saints. In his first year, he guided the team to the second division title. The Saints went on to reach six straight NBL Grand Finals upon entering the top league. He led the Saints to championships in 1984, 1985, 1987 and 1988. He finished his playing career as a four-time All-Star Five member, a two-time outstanding guard, a two-time scoring champion, and a three-time assist champion. He played 252 NBL games in total, scoring 5004 points for a career average over 20 points per game. His No. 5 jersey was retired by the Saints in 2010 and in 2021, he was named the second greatest NBL player of all time.

== Coaching career ==
Following his retirement in 1996, McFadden became heavily involved with junior player development, founding his own hoops academy in Wellington as well as coaching the Junior Tall Blacks to the under-19 world championships in 2009. He was well known as the mentor and manager of New Zealand NBA player Steven Adams.

In 2010 and 2011, McFadden served as an assistant coach for the Wellington Saints under coach Pero Cameron. He returned to the role in 2019 under coach Paul Henare and again in 2021 under Zico Coronel. The Saints won championships all four years with McFadden as assistant.

== Personal life ==
McFadden's father and three uncles played gridiron professionally. In the 1980s, McFadden's brother was a DJ in New York.

McFadden was childhood friends with NBA legend Magic Johnson.

== Medical condition and death ==
In 2017, McFadden was rushed to hospital with acute respiratory failure and was subsequently diagnosed with polycystic kidney disease, a genetic disorder. For more than a year, he had to go to hospital three times a week to be hooked up to a dialysis machine for four and a half hours at a time. He had a kidney donated to him in 2018.

McFadden died in March 2022 in Wellington at age 61 from polycystic kidney disease.
