= 1984 New Zealand NBL season =

- League: New Zealand NBL
- Sport: Basketball
- Number of teams: 8

Regular season
- Minor premiers: Wellington
- Top scorer: Kenny McFadden (Wellington)

Playoffs
- Champions: Wellington
- Runners-up: Auckland

New Zealand NBL seasons
- ← 1983 1985 →

The 1984 NBL season was the third season of the National Basketball League. The addition of Ponsonby and the readmittance of Hamilton for the 1984 season coincided with Porirua and Waitemata dropping out of the league. Wellington won the championship in 1984 to claim their first league title, beating out an Auckland side who were back-to-back defending champions.

== Final standings ==
#	Team
	Wellington
Silver medal	Auckland
3	Hamilton
4	Canterbury
5	Ponsonby
6	Nelson
7	Napier
8	Centrals

== Season awards ==
- NZ Most Valuable Player: John Rademakers (Canterbury)
- Most Outstanding Guard: Kenny McFadden (Wellington)
- Most Outstanding Forward: Ben Anthony (Auckland)
- Scoring Champion: Kenny McFadden (Wellington)
- Rebounding Champion: Mark Davis (Hamilton)
- Assist Champion: Clyde Huntley (Canterbury)
- All-Star Five:
  - Ben Anthony (Auckland)
  - Clyde Huntley (Canterbury)
  - Zack Jones (Hamilton)
  - Kenny McFadden (Wellington)
  - Jacque Tuz (Nelson)
