= 2008 New Zealand NBL season =

- League: New Zealand NBL
- Sport: Basketball
- Duration: 28 February – 20 June
- Number of games: 18
- Number of teams: 10

Regular season
- Minor premiers: Wellington Saints
- Season MVP: Jason Crowe (Waikato Pistons)
- Top scorer: Brian Wethers (Waikato Pistons)

Playoffs
- Champions: Waikato Pistons
- Runners-up: Wellington Saints
- Finals MVP: Puke Lenden

New Zealand NBL seasons
- ← 2007 2009 →

The 2008 NBL season was the 27th season of the National Basketball League. The Waikato Pistons won the championship in 2008 to claim their third league title.

== Summary ==
=== Regular season standings ===
Pos
Pos	Team	W	L
1	Wellington Saints	14	4
2	Waikato Pistons	13	5
3	Harbour Heat	11	7
4	Hawke's Bay Hawks	11	7
5	Nelson Giants	10	8
6	Auckland Stars	9	9
7	Taranaki Dynamos	9	9
8	Canterbury Rams	6	12
9	Manawatu Jets	5	13
10	Otago Nuggets	2	16

=== Playoff bracket ===
Quarterfinals
4	Hawke's Bay Hawks	75
5	Nelson Giants	78
3	Harbour Heat	84
6	Auckland Stars	94

Semifinals
1	Wellington Saints	86
5	Nelson Giants	75
2	Waikato Pistons	86
6	Auckland Stars	80

Finals
Wellington Saints	78	79	X
Waikato Pistons	95	84	X

== Awards ==
=== Player of the Week ===
Round	Player	Team	Ref
1	Jamil Terrell	Nelson Giants	
2	Casey Frank	Auckland Stars	
3	Jason Crowe	Waikato Pistons	
4	Casey Frank	Auckland Stars	
5	Jason Crowe	Waikato Pistons	
6	Ernest Scott	Wellington Saints	
7	Jeremy Kench	Canterbury Rams	
8	Link Abrams	Taranaki Dynamos	
9	Kantrail Horton	Manawatu Jets	
10	Jason Crowe	Waikato Pistons	
10	Jeremy Kench	Canterbury Rams	
11	Jason Crowe	Waikato Pistons	
12	Link Abrams	Taranaki Dynamos	
13	Michael Harrison	Nelson Giants	
14	John Whorton	Canterbury Rams	
15	Jason Crowe	Waikato Pistons	

=== Statistics leaders ===
Stats as of the end of the regular season

Category	Player	Team	Stat
Points per game	Brian Wethers	Waikato Pistons	27.6
Rebounds per game	Antoine Tisby	Otago Nuggets	10.8
Assists per game	Jason Crowe	Waikato Pistons	8.3
Steals per game	Jeremy Kench	Canterbury Rams	3.3
Blocks per game	Michael Harrison	Nelson Giants	2.4

=== Regular season ===
- Most Valuable Player: Jason Crowe (Waikato Pistons)
- NZ Most Valuable Player: Casey Frank (Auckland Stars)
- Most Outstanding Guard: Jason Crowe (Waikato Pistons)
- Most Outstanding NZ Guard: Phill Jones (Nelson Giants)
- Most Outstanding Forward: Casey Frank (Auckland Stars)
- Most Outstanding NZ Forward/Centre: Casey Frank (Auckland Stars)
- Scoring Champion: Brian Wethers (Waikato Pistons)
- Rebounding Champion: Antoine Tisby (Otago Nuggets)
- Assist Champion: Jason Crowe (Waikato Pistons)
- Rookie of the Year: Tyrone Davey (Auckland Stars)
- Coach of the Year: Doug Marty (Wellington Saints)
- All-Star Five:
  - G: Jason Crowe (Waikato Pistons)
  - G: Brian Wethers (Waikato Pistons)
  - F: Ernest Scott (Wellington Saints)
  - F: Casey Frank (Auckland Stars)
  - C: Nick Horvath (Wellington Saints)

=== Playoffs ===
- Finals MVP: Puke Lenden (Waikato Pistons)
