= Terrence Lewis (basketball) =

American-New Zealand professional basketball player

Personal information
- Born: 20 October 1969 (age 57) Birmingham, Alabama
- Listed height: 193 cm (6 ft 4 in)
- Listed weight: 95 kg (209 lb)

Career information
- High school: Ramsay (Birmingham, Alabama)
- College: Howard College (1988–1990); Washington State (1990–1992)
- NBA draft: 1992: undrafted
- Playing career: 1993–2009
- Position: Shooting guard / small forward

Career history
- 1993–1996: Wellington Saints
- 1994: Shell Rimula X
- 1995–1996: Antalyaspor
- 1999–2001: Wellington Saints
- 1999–2000: Chester Jets
- 2002: Canterbury Rams
- 2003–2008: Wellington Saints
- 2009: Southland Flyers

Career highlights
- NBL champion (2003); NBL Kiwi MVP (2002); 2× NBL Most Outstanding Guard (1999, 2002); NBL Most Outstanding Kiwi Guard (2002); NBL Most Outstanding Kiwi Forward/Centre (2001); NBL scoring champion (1999); 4× NBL All-Star Five (1993, 1999, 2000, 2002); First-team All-Pac-10 (1992); Alabama Mr. Basketball (1988)

Terrence Dewayne Lewis (born 20 October 1969) is an American-New Zealand former professional basketball player who played the majority of his career in the National Basketball League for the Wellington Saints. He played two years of college basketball for Washington State before venturing to New Zealand. He also had stints in England, Taiwan, Turkey and the Philippines.

== College career ==
Graduating from Ramsay High School as the 1988 Alabama Mr. Basketball, Lewis was set to join Providence for his freshman college season, but later failed to meet the academic requirements of Proposition 48 after recording an ACT score of 14. Instead of sitting out a year at Providence, Lewis opted to go the junior college route and enrolled at Howard JC in Big Spring, Texas, where he earned first-team JUCO All-America honors after shooting 62.5 percent from the field and averaging close to 27 points per game as a sophomore in 1989–90. After his junior college eligibility ran short, Lewis committed to play for Washington State.

In two seasons for the Cougars, Lewis shot 40% (137-of-343) from three-point range. After helping WSU to the NIT in 1992, Lewis got a training camp look with the Seattle SuperSonics and then was steered by his agent to New Zealand.

== Professional career ==
Lewis landed with the Wellington Saints and averaged 29 points per game in his first season in 1993. He subsequently earned NBL All-Star Five honors that year, but noted his displeasure of the league's import focus, stating "You were only allowed two imports per team and everything was focused on the imports and it could be frustrating because I'd get a teammate an open shot – an easy layup – and he'd give the ball right back to me. I wasn't there to be arrogant and take every shot."

It took four seasons for Lewis to run into an overseas basketball turmoil experience. Following the 1996 season, sponsorships dried up and the Saints merged with a team in nearby Hutt Valley – whose owner didn't have any use for Lewis. So he returned to the United States, had knee surgery and in the meantime – as he had during New Zealand off-seasons – he made cameos in other countries. He had a brief stint in the Philippines in 1994 and spent the 1995–96 season in Turkey.

Having earlier married a New Zealander, a return to the country seemed inevitable – and, sure enough, after another ownership shuffle, Lewis was a Saint again for the 1999 season. He later spent the 1999–2000 season in England playing for the Chester Jets.

Following a salary dispute, Lewis jumped ship and joined the Canterbury Rams for the 2002 season where he dominated playing alongside John Whorton. He returned to Wellington in 2003 where he claimed his first and only championship, despite having two coaches quit and the team nearly folding for lack of money. Lewis finally left the Saints following the 2008 season after butting heads with coach Doug Marty.

After hanging up the boots in late 2008, retirement did not sit well with Lewis, and in July 2009, he signed with the Southland Flyers for the National Provincial Championships. The Flyers went on to win the Open Men's championship with the help of Lewis.

== International career ==
In 2000, Lewis began the process of becoming a naturalized citizen of New Zealand, and two years later joined the national team, the Tall Blacks – the highlight being a best-of-three tour against Yao Ming and the Chinese national team.

== Personal life ==
Lewis and his wife, New Zealander Alinthian Reedy, have two children: Terrence Jr. and Ebony Jordon. Lewis is now employed as an officer for the Aviation Security Service based at Wellington International Airport, New Zealand
