= Northland Suns =

- League: National Basketball League
- Founded: 1995
- Folded: 1998
- History: Northland Suns; 1995–1998
- Location: Whangārei, Northland, New Zealand
- Team colours: Orange & navy blue
- Championships: 0

The Northland Suns were a New Zealand basketball team based in Whangārei. The Suns competed in the National Basketball League (NBL).

== Team history ==
The Northland Suns started in the second-tiered Conference Basketball League (CBL). Teams representing Whangārei and the Northland Region played in the CBL throughout the 1980s and 1990s, with Cable Price Whangarei finishing second in the Northern Conference in 1986, and Abbey Mazda Northland finishing second in 1987. In 1991, Mobil Marters Northland won the CBL championship. Mobil Marters went on to finish runners-up in 1992, before winning their second CBL championship in 1994.

Following the 1994 championship, Northland were promoted to the National Basketball League (NBL) for the 1995 season. The Suns spent four seasons in the NBL, finishing 13th in 1995, 11th in 1996, 8th in 1997, and 11th in 1998. Their 1998 campaign saw them become the first team in NBL history to go an entire season without a win. They subsequently withdrew from the NBL and ceased operations following the 1998 season.

The Northland Suns brand returned in 2010, with a team playing three years in the Senior Intercity Competition, a national second division competition colloquially known as the Conference Basketball League.
