= Wellington Saints =

Basketball team in Wellington, New Zealand

- League: NZNBL
- Founded: 1981
- History: Wellington Saints; 1983–1996; 1999–2019; 2021–present Wellington Wizards; 1997–1998
- Arena: TSB Bank Arena
- Location: Wellington, New Zealand
- Team colours: Blue & white
- Main sponsor: Mills Albert
- CEO: Jordan Mills
- Head coach: Aaron Young
- Ownership: Nick Mills
- Championships: 13 (1984, 1985, 1987, 1988, 2003, 2010, 2011, 2014, 2016, 2017, 2019, 2021, 2025)
- Retired numbers: 1 (5)
- Website: Saints.co.nz
Home	Away

The Wellington Saints are a New Zealand professional men's basketball team based in Wellington. The Saints compete in the National Basketball League (NBL) and play their home games at TSB Bank Arena. For sponsorship reasons, they are known as the Mills Albert Wellington Saints.

== Team history ==
The Wellington Saints were founded in 1981. In 1982, the Exchequer Saints won the second division title, which promoted them to the first division for the 1983 season. The Saints went on to play in six straight championship games upon joining the NBL, winning titles in 1984, 1985, 1987 and 1988. They played in their seventh final in 1991, where they lost to the Hutt Valley Lakers.

At the end of the 1996 season, both the Saints and the Lakers were struggling to survive. They amalgamated for the 1997 season, becoming TransAlta Wellington. With fans wanting a 'real' name, for the 1998 season, they became the TransAlta Wizards. For the 1999 season, they returned to the original identity of Saints.

The Saints returned to title contenders in the 2000s, winning their fifth championship in 2003 and finishing as runners-up in 2001 and 2008. In the 2010s, the Saints played in every championship game between 2010 and 2019, except 2013. They claimed back-to-back titles in 2010 and 2011, before claiming their eighth championship in 2014. With their ninth title in 2016, the Saints matched the Auckland Stars for most championships in NBL history. In 2017, the Saints made NBL history by becoming the first team to complete a perfect regular season, going 18–0. They went on to defeat the Canterbury Rams in the semi-finals before becoming the first team to complete an unbeaten season, capping off a perfect 20–0 campaign by beating the Southland Sharks 108–75 in the final. Their tenth championship set a new record for most in NBL history. The Saints returned to the final in 2018, but missed the chance at their first three-peat with a 98–96 loss to the Sharks. In 2019, the Saints completed their second undefeated regular season in three years, going 18–0, before completing another perfect 20–0 campaign by defeating the Hawke's Bay Hawks 78–68 in the final to win their 11th title.

The Saints sat out the 2020 season due to the COVID-19 pandemic. They returned in 2021 and won their 12th championship.

In November 2024, the Saints unveiled a rebranded logo and identity for the 2025 season to honour their 40-year legacy. The Saints went on to earn the minor premiership in 2025 with a first-place finish and a 16–4 record, before reaching the NBL final for the first time since 2021. In the final, the Saints defeated the Southland Sharks 88–83 to win their 13th championship. In the 2026 season, the Saints returned to the NBL final after a 112–69 semi-final victory over the Auckland Tuatara. In the final, the Saints were defeated 104–101 in overtime by the Sharks.

== Honour roll ==
NBL Championships:	13 (1984, 1985, 1987, 1988, 2003, 2010, 2011, 2014, 2016, 2017, 2019, 2021, 2025)
Most Valuable Player:	Lindsay Tait (2010, 2013), Corey Webster (2014, 2017), Torrey Craig (2015), Shea Ili, (2018), Nick Kay (2019), Dion Prewster (2021), Xavier Cooks (2022), Elijah Pepper (2026)
Kiwi MVP:	Neil Stephens (1992), Lindsay Tait (2013, 2015), Corey Webster (2014, 2017), Shea Ili (2018)
All-Star Five:	Kenny McFadden (1983, 1984, 1985, 1988), Darryl Johnson (1998), DeWayne McCray (1998), Terrence Lewis (1999, 2000), Mark Dickel (2002), Ben Knight (2004), Nick Horvath (2006, 2008), Michael Efevberha (2009), Lindsay Tait (2010, 2011, 2013), Eric Devendorf (2010), Corey Webster (2014, 2017), Torrey Craig (2015, 2016), Shea Ili (2017, 2018, 2019), Tai Wesley (2017), Nick Kay (2019), Dion Prewster (2021), Taane Samuel (2021), Xavier Cooks (2022), Nick Marshall (2025), Elijah Pepper (2026)
Most Outstanding Guard:	Kenny McFadden (1983, 1984), Terrence Lewis (1999), Michael Efevberha (2009), Lindsay Tait (2010, 2011, 2012, 2013), Corey Webster (2014, 2017), Torrey Craig (2015), Dion Prewster (2021), Nick Marshall (2025), Elijah Pepper (2026)
Most Outstanding Kiwi Guard:	Lindsay Tait (2010, 2011, 2013, 2015), Corey Webster (2014, 2017), Shea Ili (2016, 2018, 2019), Dion Prewster (2021), Izayah Le'afa (2025)
Most Outstanding Forward:	Kerry Boagni (1988, 1990), Tai Wesley (2017), Nick Kay (2019), Xavier Cooks (2022)
Most Outstanding Kiwi Forward/Centre:	Neil Stephens (1989, 1992), Terrence Lewis (2001), Robert Loe (2019)
Scoring Champion:	Kenny McFadden (1983, 1984), Kerry Boagni (1992), Terrence Lewis (1999), Michael Efevberha (2009), Eric Devendorf (2010), Corey Webster (2017), Elijah Pepper (2026)
Assist Champion:	Kenny McFadden (1985, 1987, 1991), Mark Dickel (1998), George Le'afa (2003), Lindsay Tait (2010, 2013, 2015), Jason Crowe (2012)
Rookie of the Year:	Steven Adams (2011)
Coach of the Year:	Mike McHugh (2003), Doug Marty (2008), Pero Cameron (2010), Kevin Braswell (2017), Zico Coronel (2021), Aaron Young (2025)

== Current roster ==
Note: Flags indicate national team eligibility at FIBA-sanctioned events. Players may hold other non-FIBA nationalities not displayed.

Wellington Saints roster
Players
Coaches

Pos.	No.	Nat.	Name	Ht.
F	0	(New Zealand)	Davison, Carlin	1.97 m (6 ft 6 in)
G/F	1	(United States)	Ingram, Donte (I)	1.98 m (6 ft 6 in)
G	2	(New Zealand)	Le'afa, Izayah (C)	1.88 m (6 ft 2 in)
F	3	(New Zealand)	Gold, Sam	2.01 m (6 ft 7 in)
G	4	(New Zealand)	Moore, Ryder	1.85 m (6 ft 1 in)
G	6	(New Zealand)	Munir, Hassan	1.80 m (5 ft 11 in)
F	7	(Australia)	Aliir, Akech (I)	2.04 m (6 ft 8 in)
G	8	(New Zealand)	Iuli, Braydon	1.90 m (6 ft 3 in)
G	9	(New Zealand)	Magalogo, Keelan	1.93 m (6 ft 4 in)
G	10	(New Zealand)	Nonu, Mercury
G	11	(New Zealand)	Blackmore, Alex	1.96 m (6 ft 5 in)
G	12	(New Zealand)	Chunga, Aubrey	1.93 m (6 ft 4 in)
F	13	(New Zealand)	Harris, Hyrum	2.04 m (6 ft 8 in)
F	15	(New Zealand)	Hunt, Jordan	2.06 m (6 ft 9 in)
G	17	(New Zealand)	Robertson, Arana	1.90 m (6 ft 3 in)
G	27	(New Zealand)	Pilcher, Arthur	1.89 m (6 ft 2 in)
G	40	(Australia)	Pepper, Elijah (I)	1.93 m (6 ft 4 in)
F	44	(New Zealand)	Latu, Darius

Head coach

- (New Zealand) Aaron Young

Assistant coach(es)

- (New Zealand) Jordan Mills
- (New Zealand) Chris Tupu

Legend

- (C) Team captain
- (DP) Development player
- (IN) Inactive
- (I) Import player
- Injured

- Roster
Updated: 7 June 2026

== Notable players ==
Note: Flags indicate national team eligibility at FIBA-sanctioned events. Players may hold other non-FIBA nationalities not displayed.

Criteria

To appear in this section a player must have either:

- Set a club record or won an individual award while at the club
- Played at least one official international match for their national team at any time
- Played at least one official NBA match at any time.

- (United States) Kenny McFadden
- (United States) Kevin Braswell
- (New Zealand) Thomas Abercrombie
- (New Zealand) Steven Adams
- (United States) Brandon Bowman
- (Australia) Xavier Cooks
- (United States) Torrey Craig
- (New Zealand) Corey Webster
- (New Zealand) Lindsay Tait
- (New Zealand) Shea Ili
- (United States) Tai Wesley
- (United States) Kerry Boagni
- (United States) / (New Zealand) Casey Frank
- (Australia) Kyle Adnam
- (United States) Eric Devendorf
- (United States) Terrence Lewis
- (Australia) Nick Kay

=== Retired numbers ===
Wellington Saints Retired Numbers
No	Nat.	Player	Position	Tenure	Ceremony date
5	(United States)	Kenny McFadden	PG	1982–2021	30 June 2010

== CBL team ==
The Saints began in the second-tiered Conference Basketball League (CBL), winning the CBL title in 1982. In 1997, Wellington's second division team, TransAlta Wellington, finished as runners-up in the CBL. In 2000, Wellington's second division CBL team was called Capital Punishment. In 2001, the Wellington College Saints finished as CBL runners-up. In 2008, the Saints' second division team won the CBL championship with a 90–84 win over the Waikato Titans in the final.
