= Taranaki Airs =

Basketball team in New Plymouth, New Zealand

- League: NZNBL
- Founded: 1981
- History: New Plymouth Bulls; 1985–1991; New Plymouth Bears; 1992–1993; Taranaki Bears; 1994–1997; Taranaki Oilers; 1998–1999; Taranaki Mountainairs; 2003–2007; Taranaki Dynamos; 2008–2009; Taranaki Mountainairs; 2010–2021; Taranaki Airs; 2022–present
- Arena: TSB Stadium
- Location: New Plymouth, Taranaki, New Zealand
- Team colours: Yellow & Black
- Head coach: Vacant
- Ownership: Vacant
- Championships: 0
- Website: TaranakiAirs.com
Home	Away

The Taranaki Airs are a New Zealand professional basketball team based in New Plymouth. The Airs compete in the National Basketball League (NBL) and play their home games at TSB Stadium.

== Team history ==
A New Plymouth team played in the inaugural season of the Conference Basketball League (CBL) in 1981 and earned runners-up honours. The team went on to finish as runners-up in the CBL Northern Conference in 1983, before winning the CBL championship in 1984.

The team was promoted to the National Basketball League (NBL) for the 1985 season. The team was originally known as the Bulls. The team became known as the New Plymouth Bears in 1992, the same year they were crowned regular season winners for the first time. The team was rebranded as Taranaki in 1994 and then became the Oilers in 1998. Following the 1999 season, the franchise withdrew from the NBL.

In 2001, a Taranaki team known as the Stormers were the winners of the CBL Central Conference. The following year, the Stormers were once again winners of the CBL Central Conference, earning an 18–0 season record before going on to win the CBL championship with an 85–81 victory over the Kaikoura Whale Riders in the final led by point guard Willie Banks and import forward Link Abrams.

In 2003, Taranaki returned to the NBL as the Mountainairs. In 2009 and 2015, the team had winless seasons. In 2016, they won eight games for the first time since 2008. The Mountainairs subsequently won just 10 of 54 games between 2017 and 2019.

In September 2019, it was revealed that the team had significant debt that could cause them to withdraw from the 2020 NBL season. The following month, naming rights partner Steelformers stepped in to save the team from collapse.

In December 2021, the team name was changed from Mountainairs to Airs. In 2022, the Airs finished on top of the regular-season standings with a 12–6 record to be crowned minor premiers for just the second time in franchise history and first since 1992.

In September 2023, the team was acquired by Media8 Sports, an Australian sports media company. In November 2026, it was revealed that the ownership group had stepped away, with Basketball Taranaki leading a community initiative aimed at saving the team.

== Current roster ==
Note: Flags indicate national team eligibility at FIBA-sanctioned events. Players may hold other non-FIBA nationalities not displayed.

Taranaki Airs roster
Players
Coaches

Pos.	No.	Nat.	Name	Ht.
G	0	(United States)	Cook Jr., Aaron (I)	1.88 m (6 ft 2 in)
G	00	(New Zealand)	Pearn, Zavier	1.92 m (6 ft 4 in)
G	1	(United States)	Stroud, Brandon (I)	1.98 m (6 ft 6 in)
F	2	(New Zealand)	Samuel, Taane	2.00 m (6 ft 7 in)
F	3	(New Zealand)	Jones, Marcel	2.03 m (6 ft 8 in)
G	4	(New Zealand)	Tamatea, Jerome	1.78 m (5 ft 10 in)
F	5	(New Zealand)	Vea, Luka	1.98 m (6 ft 6 in)
F	6	(New Zealand)	Tuhaka, Lyric
G/F	7	(New Zealand)	Carr, Hayden
G	8	(New Zealand)	Cooper, Jordan
G	9	(New Zealand)	Adam, Zavier	1.86 m (6 ft 1 in)
F	10	(United States)	Green, Xavier (I)	1.98 m (6 ft 6 in)
G	11	(New Zealand)	Tuuta, Riley	1.90 m (6 ft 3 in)
F/C	13	(New Zealand)	Moors, James	2.08 m (6 ft 10 in)
F	22	(New Zealand)	James, Cooper
F	32	(New Zealand)	Bailey, Quintin (C)	2.01 m (6 ft 7 in)
F	41	(New Zealand)	Rusholme Cobb, Rufus	2.01 m (6 ft 7 in)
G/F	42	(New Zealand)	Hill, Nico	1.93 m (6 ft 4 in)

Head coach

- (Australia) John White

Assistant coach(es)

- (New Zealand) Andrew Green
- (New Zealand) Trent Adam

Legend

- (C) Team captain
- (DP) Development player
- (I) Import player
- Injured

- Roster
Updated: 18 June 2026
