= Harbour Heat =

- League: National Basketball League
- Founded: 1986
- Folded: 2012
- History: North Shore; 1986–1989; North Harbour Vikings; 1990–1997; North Harbour Kings; 1998–2001; Harbour Kings; 2002; Harbour Heat; 2003–2010; 2012
- Arena: North Shore Events Centre
- Location: Auckland, New Zealand
- Team colours: Black, maroon, white
- Championships: 0

The Harbour Heat were a New Zealand basketball team based in Auckland. The Heat competed in the National Basketball League (NBL) and played their home games at North Shore Events Centre.

== Team history ==
The Harbour Heat, then known as North Shore, started in the second-tiered Conference Basketball League (CBL). After winning the CBL Northern championship in 1985, the team was promoted to the National Basketball League (NBL) for the 1986 season. North Shore reached their first NBL final in 1988, where they lost 81–78 to the Wellington Saints. In 1998, as the North Harbour Kings, the team reached their second NBL final, where they lost 81–73 to the Nelson Giants. In 2000, the Kings were regular season winners for the first time with a 12–4 record. In 2007, the Harbour Heat were regular season winners with a 14–4 record.

After sitting out the 2011 season, the Heat returned to the NBL in 2012, only to withdraw again permanently after that.
