= Hawke's Bay Hawks =

Basketball team in Napier, New Zealand

- League: NZNBL
- History: Napier Sunhawks; 1983–1985; Hawke's Bay Hawks; 1986–1998; 2000–2019; 2021–
- Arena: Pettigrew Green Arena
- Location: Napier, Hawke's Bay, New Zealand
- Team colours: Black, grey, orange
- Main sponsor: Big Barrel
- President: Sally Crown
- General manager: Jarrod Kenny
- Head coach: Will Lopez
- Championships: 1 (2006)
- Retired numbers: 2 (8, 14)
- Website: Hawks.org.nz
Home	Away

The Hawke's Bay Hawks are a New Zealand professional basketball team based in Napier. The Hawks compete in the National Basketball League (NBL) and play their home games at Pettigrew Green Arena. For sponsorship reasons, they are known as the Big Barrel Hawks.

== Team history ==
The Hawke's Bay Hawks, then known as the Napier Sunhawks, started in the second-tiered Conference Basketball League (CBL). After winning the CBL Invitation championship in 1982, the team was promoted to the National Basketball League (NBL) for the 1983 season. They made the semi-finals in 1983, before going on a nine-year playoff hiatus. The Hawks made the semi-finals every year between 1993 and 1997, including playing in their first NBL championship series in 1995, where they lost 2–0 to the Auckland Stars.

In 1998, the Hawks finished tenth in the 11-team competition. They subsequently withdrew from the NBL and joined the CBL for the 1999 season. After finishing as CBL runners-up in 1999, the Hawks returned to the NBL in 2000.

In 2004, the Hawks made their first NBL playoff appearance since 1997. They went on to reach the championship round three years in a row between 2005 and 2007, which included them winning their maiden NBL championship in 2006 with an 84–69 victory over the Auckland Stars in the final. The Hawks continued to play in the post-season every year between 2008 and 2012, including making the final in 2011 and winning their first minor premiership in 2012. After missing the playoffs in 2013, the Hawks' 2014 season saw them win second minor premiership and reach the championship round for the sixth time.

Between 2015 and 2017, the Hawks had a three-year playoff hiatus, including a winless campaign in 2016. They returned to the playoffs in 2018, before reaching the NBL final in 2019, where they lost 78–68 to the Wellington Saints despite leading 59–38 midway through the third quarter.

The Hawks sat out the 2020 season due to the COVID-19 pandemic. They returned in 2021 and reached their eighth NBL final, where they once again lost to the Wellington Saints.

== Honour roll ==
NBL Championships:	1 (2006)
NBL Playoff appearances:	19 (1983, 1993, 1994, 1995, 1996, 1997, 2004, 2005, 2006, 2007, 2008, 2009, 2010, 2011, 2012, 2014, 2018, 2019, 2021)
NBL Grand Final appearances:	8 (1995, 2005, 2006, 2007, 2011, 2014, 2019, 2021)
Most Valuable Player:	Adrian Majstrovich (2004), Paora Winitana (2006)
Kiwi MVP:	Adrian Majstrovich (2004), Paora Winitana (2007)
All-Star Five:	Thomas DeMarcus (1983), Willie Burton (1987, 1988), Jamie Dixon (1989, 1990), Kerry Boagni (1993), Terry Giles (1993), Darryl Johnson (1995), Paul Henare (2003, 2005), Adrian Majstrovich (2004), Paora Winitana (2006, 2012), Dustin Scott (2014), Angus Brandt (2018), E. J. Singler (2019), Brandon Bowman (2019)
Most Outstanding Guard:	Jamie Dixon (1989, 1990), Terry Giles (1993), Paora Winitana (2006)
Most Outstanding Kiwi Guard:	Byron Vaetoe (1993), Paora Winitana (2006)
Most Outstanding Forward:	Willie Burton (1989), Kerry Boagni (1993), Adrian Majstrovich (2004)
Most Outstanding Kiwi Forward/Centre:	Willie Burton (1997), Adrian Majstrovich (2004)
Scoring Champion:	Jamie Dixon (1989, 1990), Kerry Boagni (1993), Troy Coleman (2000)
Rebounding Champion:	Willie Burton (1987, 1994), Robert Wilson (1998), Amir Williams (2017)
Assist Champion:	Jamie Dixon (1989), Terry Giles (1993), Shaun McCreedy (2000), Paul Henare (2004, 2005, 2007), Jarrod Kenny (2017, 2019)
Rookie of the Year:	Adrian Majstrovich (2003)
Coach of the Year:	Curtis Wooten (1989), James Logan (1993), Shawn Dennis (2004), Paul Henare (2012), Tab Baldwin (2014)
Most Improved Player:	Ethan Rusbatch (2019)

Source: Hawks NBL Role of Honour

== Players ==
=== Current roster ===
Note: Flags indicate national team eligibility at FIBA-sanctioned events. Players may hold other non-FIBA nationalities not displayed.

Hawke's Bay Hawks roster
Players
Coaches

Pos.	No.	Nat.	Name	Ht.
G	1	(New Zealand)	Costley, Kobe
F	2	(New Zealand)	Casson, Balin	1.91 m (6 ft 3 in)
F	3	(New Zealand)	Kara, Kobe	1.91 m (6 ft 3 in)
G	6	(New Zealand)	Singh, Lennox	1.80 m (5 ft 11 in)
G	7	(New Zealand)	Murphy, Jacob	1.88 m (6 ft 2 in)
G	9	(New Zealand)	Ball, Kees
G	10	(New Zealand)	Taylor, Maz	1.86 m (6 ft 1 in)
G/F	11	(Australia)	Grida, Daniel (I)	1.97 m (6 ft 6 in)
G	12	(New Zealand)	Allan, Isaac	1.91 m (6 ft 3 in)
F	15	(New Zealand)	Fergusson, Tommy	2.03 m (6 ft 8 in)
F	17	(New Zealand)	Bush, Clifton	1.98 m (6 ft 6 in)
G	22	(New Zealand)	Rasmussen, Keanu	1.88 m (6 ft 2 in)
F	23	(United States)	McLaughlin, Jeremy (I)	2.03 m (6 ft 8 in)
F	24	(New Zealand)	Eagle, Ezrah	1.93 m (6 ft 4 in)
G	28	(New Zealand)	Burton, Alonzo (C)	1.93 m (6 ft 4 in)
F	76	(New Zealand)	Deck, Eddie
C	88	(United States)	Jeter, Chase (I)	2.08 m (6 ft 10 in)
G		(New Zealand)	Ball, Jackson	1.91 m (6 ft 3 in)

Head coach

- (Australia) Will Lopez

Assistant coach(es)

- (New Zealand) Willie Burton
- (New Zealand) Aidan Daly
- (New Zealand) Kaine Hokianga

Legend

- (C) Team captain
- (DP) Development player
- (IN) Inactive
- (I) Import player
- Injured

- Roster
Updated: 11 July 2026

=== Notable past players ===
- (New Zealand) Marco Alexander
- (United States) Kerry Boagni
- (United States) Brandon Bowman
- (Nigeria) / (United States) Suleiman Braimoh
- (United States) / (New Zealand) Willie Burton
- (United States) / (New Zealand) Clifton Bush
- (New Zealand) Aidan Daly
- (United States) Jamie Dixon
- (New Zealand) Paul Henare
- (New Zealand) Jeremy Kench
- (New Zealand) Jarrod Kenny
- (Australia) Daniel Kickert
- (New Zealand) / (Australia) Adrian Majstrovich
- (Australia) Scott McGregor
- (United States) Chris Porter
- (United States) / (New Zealand) Dion Prewster
- (United States) / (Australia) Dusty Rychart
- (United States) E. J. Singler
- (New Zealand) Paora Winitana
