= Conference Basketball League =

Conference Basketball League (CBL)
- Sport: Basketball
- First season: 1981
- Folded: 2010
- Country: New Zealand
- Continent: FIBA Oceania (Oceania)
- Level on pyramid: 2
- Related competitions: New Zealand NBL
- Website: basketball.org.nz/cbl

The Conference Basketball League (CBL) was a second-tier men's semi-professional basketball league in New Zealand. During the 1980s and 1990s, the CBL was a second-tier league beneath the National Basketball League (NBL), with promotion and relegation between the two leagues. By the 2000s, the system of promotion and relegation was scrapped, and the league was instead contested by provincial representative teams. During this era, NBL clubs also entered academy teams into the league, and the CBL also served as a development league for NBL teams.

== History ==
The Conference Basketball League (CBL) ran every year between 1981 and 2008, and consisted of multiple conferences throughout its lifetime, including northern, capital, central, and southern. From seven teams in 1996, the CBL grew to 25 teams spread over four conferences in 1999. The challenges facing the league by the late 2000s were similar to the national women's league, namely finding a format that teams could economically support. Basketball New Zealand chose not to host the CBL in 2009, before bringing it back in a one-off, five-day tournament in 2010.

== League results ==
Conference Basketball League Finals Results
Year	Result	Year	Result
1981	1. Otago; 2. New Plymouth	1996	1. Waitakere Rangers; 2. Pony Hibiscus Flash
1982	Northern; 1. Exchequer Saints (Wgtn); 2. Burroughs Karori (Wgtn); Invitation; 1. Napier Sunhawks; 2. Burroughs Karori (Wgtn)	1997	1. North Otago Penguins; 2. TransAlta Wellington
1983	Northern; 1. Hamilton; 2. New Plymouth; Southern; 1. Burroughs Karori (Wgtn); 2. Otago	1998	1. Smokefree Southland Sharks; 2. North Otago Penguins
1984	1. Hertz New Plymouth; 2. Palmerston North	1999	1. North Otago Penguins; 2. Masonic Hawks
1985	Northern; 1. Truth North Shore; 2. Waitemata; Southern; 1. 4ZB Otago; 2. Wanganui Wolfpack	2000	1. North Otago Penguins; 2. Kaikoura Whale Riders
1986	Northern; 1. Rotorua; 2. Cable Price Whangarei; Southern; 1. Rheineck Wanganui; 2. Speights Otago	2001	1. Kaikoura Whale Riders; 2. Wellington College Saints
1987	1. Waitemata; 2. Abbey Mazda Northland	2002	1. Treehouse Taranaki Stormers; 2. Kaikoura Whale Riders
1988	1. U-Bix Palmerston North; 2. Wainuiomata	2003	1. Canterbury Knights; 2. Hutt Valley
1989	1. Hutt Valley Lakers; 2. Ultimate Fitness Porirua	2004	1. Counties Manukau Spartans; 2. BJ's Hutt Valley
1990	1. Governor's Wairarapa; 2. Nelson Suns	2005	1. Waikato Red; 2. Hutt Valley
1991	1. Mobil Marters Northland; 2. DB Hawera Hornets	2006	1. Waikato Titans; 2. Waitakere Rangers
1992	1. DB Royals New Plymouth; 2. Mobil Marters Northland	2007	1. Waikato Titans; 2. Porirua
1993	1. 96 FM Rotorua Runnin' Rebels; 2. Checkers Canterbury	2008	1. Wellington Saints; 2. Waikato Titans
1994	1. Mobil Marters Northland; 2. Quality Hotel Rotorua Runnin' Rebels	2009	No League
1995	1. Smokefree Southland Sharks; 2. Quality Hotel Rotorua Runnin' Rebels	2010	1. Hutt Valley; 2. Porirua

== CBL Zone 1 ==
In 2009, North Harbour Basketball Association took on the responsibility of hosting the Conference Basketball League in the Auckland Region. The competition was predominantly run on the North Shore and was a zone 1 competition. The league was rebranded as the Supercity Basketball Competition in 2010, and then as the Senior Intercity Competition in 2011 and 2012, although it was still colloquially known during this time as the Conference Basketball League.

=== Results ===
Year	Result	Ref
2009	1. Harbour Heat Reserves; 2. AUT	
2010	1. Breakers Academy; 2. Waitakere	
2011	1. Waitakere West; 2. Harbour Heat Reserves	
2012	1. Waitakere West; 2. Northland Suns	
