= New Zealand Breakers all-time roster =

The New Zealand Breakers are a New Zealand professional basketball team based in Auckland, New Zealand, and play in the National Basketball League. The team was established in 2003, and they play most of their regular season games at Spark Arena.

The following is a list of all the players, both past and current, who have appeared in at least one game for the club.(Updated 15 September 2020)

== 2000s ==
=== Players ===
Player	#	Position	Nationality	2003/2004*	2004/05	2005/06	2006/07	2007/08	2008/09
Thomas Abercrombie	10	G	New Zealander						Player
Hayden Allen		PG	New Zealander		Player				
Derick Alston		C/F	American					Player	Player
Brant Bailey		PF	American			Player			
Everard Bartlett	55	SG	New Zealander				Player		
Timothy Behrendorff	34	C	Australian			Player	Player	Player	Player
Dillon Boucher	24	SF	New Zealander	Player	Player				Player
C. J. Bruton	23	G	American						Player
Clifton Bush		F	American			Player			
Pero Cameron		PF	New Zealander	Player	Player				
Michael Chappell		SF	American	MVP	Player				
Brent Charleton	5	SG	Canadian			Player	Player		
Daniel Christopher	12	G/F	New Zealander					Player	
Adam Darragh	20	PG	Australian				Player		
Oscar Forman	3	PF	Australian				Player	Player	Player
Casey Frank	43	PF	American			Player			
Brian Green		SG	American					Player	
Orien Greene		G	American					Player	
Paul Henare	32	G	Australian	Captain	Captain	Captain	Captain	Captain	Captain
Phill Jones	13,21	G	New Zealander					Player	Player
Ryan Kersten	11	G	Australian					Player	
Adrian Majstrovich		SG/SF	New Zealander			Player			
Richard Melzer		F	American			Player			
Aaron Olsen	22	SG	New Zealander		MVP	Player	Player		
Kirk Penny		SG	New Zealander					MVP	MVP
Ben Pepper	31	C	Australian		Player	MVP	Player		
Carlos Powell	7	F	American				MVP		
Shawn Redhage		PF	American		Player				
Rick Rickert	7	F	American					Player	Player
Tony Ronaldson	2	F/C	Australian					Player	Player
Matt Smith		C	Australian		Player				
Lindsay Tait	4	G	New Zealander	Player	Player	Player			
Adam Tanner		C	Australian						Player
Ben Thompson		SG	Australian		Player	Player			
Marcus Timmons		SF	American		Player				
Blake Truslove		C	Australian		Player				
Mika Vukona	14	F	New Zealander	Player	Player	Player	Player	Player	
Corey Webster	9	G	New Zealander						Player
Brian Wethers		SG/SF	American				Player		
Pāora Winitana	8	G	New Zealander					Player	
Pierre Wooten	10	PG	American				Player		

=== Coaching staff ===
Coach	2003/2004	2004/05	2005/06	2006/07	2007/08	2008/09
Frank Arsego	Head Coach	Head Coach				
Judd Flavell					Assistant	Assistant
Jeff Green	Head Coach					
Andrej Lemanis			Head Coach	Head Coach	Head Coach	Head Coach
Dean Vickerman					Assistant	Assistant

== 2010s ==
=== Players ===
Player	#	Position	Nationality	2009/2010	2010/11	2011/12	2012/13	2013/14	2014/15	2015/16	2016/17	2017/18	2018/19
Thomas Abercrombie	10	SG/SF	New Zealander	Player	Player	Player	Player	Player	Player	Player	Player	Player	Captain
Yuat Alok		F	New Zealander						Player				
Brad Anderson	12	PG	New Zealander						Player				
B. J. Anthony	24	SF	New Zealander		Player	Player							
Duane Bailey	11	PF	New Zealander					Player	Player	Player			
Everard Bartlett		SG	New Zealander							Player			
Josh Bloxham	21	PG	New Zealander		Player	Player	Player						
Dillon Boucher	24	SF	New Zealander	Player	Player	Player	Player						
Kevin Braswell	11	G	American	Player	Player								
C. J. Bruton	23	PG	American	Player	Player	Player	Player	Player					
Alonzo Burton		SG	New Zealander					Player					
Paul Carter		PF	American								Player		
Rhys Carter	15	PG	Australian						Player				
Rakeem Christmas		C	American									Player	
Daryl Corletto	3	SG	Australian			Player	Player	Player					
Maxwell De Geest		PG	New Zealander										Player
Finn Delany	3	F	New Zealander							Player	Player	Player	Player
Kevin Dillard		PG	American								Player		
Oscar Forman	3	PF	Australian	Player									
Dan Fotu		PF	New Zealander									Player	
Isaac Fotu		PF	New Zealander			Player							
Casey Frank		PF	American					Player					
Paul Henare	32	G	New Zealander	Captain	Player								
Leon Henry	00	SG/SF	New Zealander		Player	Player	Player						
Will Hudson	5	PF	American				Player						
James Hunter		C	Australian									Player	
Ekenechukwu Ibekwe	25	PF	Nigerian						Player				
Shea Ili	5	PG	New Zealander						Player	Player	Player	Player	Player
Cedric Jackson	4	G	American			Player	Player		Player	Player			
Charles Jackson	33	C	American							Player			
Kerron Johnson	2	PG	American					Player					
Dominique Kelman–Poto		PF/C	New Zealander										Player
Darnell Lazare	21	SF	American					Player					
Robert Loe	15	C	New Zealander								Player	Player	
Shawn Long	21	C	American										MVP
Majok Majok	22	C	South Sudanese										Player
Shane McDonald	13	PG	Australian							Player			
Akil Mitchell	45	PF	American								Player		
Armani Moore	4	SG	American										Player
Morgan Natanahira		SF	New Zealander			Player	Player						
D. J. Newbill	25	SG	American									Player	
Mitchell Newton		SF	New Zealander									Player	
Jordan Ngatai	20	F	New Zealander						Player	Player	Player	Player	Player
Kirk Penney	6	SG	New Zealander	MVP	Player						Player	Player	
Kruz Perrot–Hunt		SG	New Zealander										Player
Alex Pledger	35	C	New Zealander	Player	Player	Player	Player	Player	Player	Player	Player		
Dion Prewster	15	SG/SF	American			Player							
Derone Raukawa	8	PG	New Zealander								Player	Player	
Patrick Richard	35	SF	American										Player
Rick Rickert	7	PF	American	Player									
John Rillie		SF	Australian	Player									
Tony Ronaldson	2	PF/C	Australian	Player									
Ethan Rusbatch	12	SF	New Zealander								Player		
Jack Salt		PF/C	English					Player					
Édgar Sosa	4	PF	American									Player	
David Stockton		PF	American								Player		
Awvee Storey		SG/SF	American	Player									
Reuben Te Rangi	7	PF	New Zealander				Player	Player	Player	Player			
Jeremiah Trueman	25	PF	New Zealander	Player				Player					
Isaih Tueta	43	PG	Australian								Player		
Tom Vodanovich		PF	New Zealander										Player
Mika Vukona	14	F	New Zealander		Captain	Captain	Captain	Captain	Captain	Captain	Captain	Captain	
Corey Webster	9	G	New Zealander	Player	Player		Player	Player	Player	Player	Player		Player
Tai Webster	8	PG	New Zealander				Player						
Jarrad Weeks	97	PG	Australian										Player
Tai Wesley	42	PF	American						Player	Player			Player
Gary Wilkinson	55	PF	American		Player	Player		Player					
Luuk Wittiveen		SG	New Zealander					Player					
Ben Woodside	11	PG	American								Player		
Tai Wynyard	16	C	New Zealander						Player	Player			

=== Coaching staff ===
Coach	2009/2010	2010/11	2011/12	2012/13	2013/14	2014/15	2015/16	2016/17	2017/18	2018/19
Rashid Al Kaleem										Assistant
Kevin Braswell										Head Coach
Michael Fitchett							Assistant	Assistant	Assistant	Assistant
Judd Flavell	Assistant	Assistant	Assistant	Assistant	Assistant	Assistant	Assistant	Assistant	Assistant	Assistant
Paul Henare						Assistant	Head Coach	Head Coach	Head Coach	
Andrej Lemanis	Head Coach	Head Coach	Head Coach	Head Coach						
Dean Vickerman	Assistant	Assistant	Assistant	Assistant	Head Coach	Head Coach				

== 2020s ==
=== Players ===
Player	#	Position	Nationality	2019/2020	2020/21	2021/22	2022/23	2023/24	2024/25	2025/26	2026/27	2027/28	2028/29
Thomas Abercrombie	10	F	New Zealander	MVP	Captain	Signed							
Brandon Ashley	21	F	American	Player									
Rasmus Bach	18	G	Danish		Player	Signed							
Isaac Davidson	12	F	New Zealander		Player	Signed							
Finn Delany	3	F	New Zealander	Player	MVP	Signed							
Deng Deng	45	F	South Sudanese	Player									
Ousmane Dieng	11	PG	French			Signed	Signed						
Kyrin Galloway	6	F	American		Player	Signed	Signed						
R. J. Hampton	14	G	American	Player									
Sek Henry	22	G	American	Player									
Scotty Hopson	1	G/F	American	Player									
Colton Iverson	4	C	American		Player								
Jeremy Kendle	90	G	American		Player								
Terry Li	0,99	G	Chinese	Player	Player								
Levi Randolph	20	G/F	American		Player								
Robert Loe	15	F/C	New Zealander	Player	Player	Signed	Signed						
Ater Majok	33	F/C	Lebanese	Player									
William McDowell-White	7	G	Australian		Player	Signed							
Taine Murray	1	G	New Zealander		Player								
Jordan Ngatai	20	F	New Zealander	Player									
Chris Obekpa	–	PF	American	Player									
Lamar Patterson	13	SF/SG	American		Player								
Glen Rice Jr.	41	PF/C	American	Player									
Ethan Rusbatch	25	F	New Zealander	Player									
Sam Timmins	33	F/C	New Zealander			Signed							
Daniel Trist	25	F	Australian		Player								
Tom Vodanovich	13	F	New Zealander	Player									
Corey Webster	9	G	New Zealander	Player	Player								
Tai Webster	0	G	New Zealander		Player	Signed	Signed						
Jarrad Weeks	97	G	Australian	Player	Player								
Yanni Wetzell	5	PF/C	New Zealander			Signed	Signed	Signed					

=== Coaching staff ===
Coach	2019/2020	2020/21	2021/22	2022/23	2023/24	2024/25	2025/26	2026/27	2027/28	2028/29
Rashid Al-Kaleem		Assistant								
Zico Coronel	Assistant									
Modi Maor	Assistant	Assistant	Signed	Signed	Signed					
Chanel Pompallier		Assistant								
Dan Shamir	Head Coach	Head Coach	Signed	Signed	Signed					
