= Duane Bailey =

New Zealand basketball player

Personal information
- Born: 28 October 1991 (age 34) Auckland, New Zealand
- Listed height: 197 cm (6 ft 6 in)
- Listed weight: 103 kg (227 lb)

Career information
- High school: Mount Albert (Auckland, New Zealand); Fraser (Hamilton, New Zealand)
- Playing career: 2011–2017
- Position: Small forward / power forward

Career history
- 2011: Manawatu Jets
- 2012: Auckland Pirates
- 2013–2014: Super City Rangers
- 2013–2015: New Zealand Breakers
- 2015–2017: Southland Sharks
- 2015–2016: Plymouth Raiders
- 2016: Brisbane Spartans

Career highlights
- NBL champion (2015); 2× NZNBL champion (2012, 2015); NZNBL Most Outstanding Kiwi Forward/Centre (2014)

Duane Benjamin Bailey (born 28 October 1991) is a New Zealand former professional basketball player who played in the New Zealand NBL and the Australian NBL.

== Early life ==
Born in Auckland, Bailey played both rugby and basketball in primary school. In 2003 and 2004, he attended Rangeview Intermediate School. For high school, he attended Mount Albert Grammar School, where he graduated Year 12 in 2009. In 2010, he attended Fraser High School in Hamilton for one final year where he was a member of Fraser's national championship-winning team.

In 2008, Bailey played for the JTB/Breakers in the Conference Basketball League (CBL). In 2010, he played in the CBL for the Waikato Titans.

== Professional career ==
=== New Zealand NBL ===
On 22 December 2010, Bailey signed a two-year deal with the Manawatu Jets of the New Zealand National Basketball League. In the 2011 New Zealand NBL season, he averaged 4.8 points and 5.2 rebounds in 17 games for the Jets.

In December 2011, Bailey parted ways with the Manawatu Jets and signed with the Auckland Pirates for the 2012 New Zealand NBL season. He won a championship with the Pirates in 2012, and averaged 3.9 points and 3.5 rebounds in 15 games.

In January 2013, Bailey joined the Super City Rangers for the 2013 New Zealand NBL season. He averaged 11.8 points and 7.8 rebounds in 15 games.

On 18 December 2013, Bailey re-signed with the Super City Rangers for the 2014 New Zealand NBL season. He averaged career highs in points (19.4), rebounds (9.3) and assists (1.8) in 2014, earning NZNBL Most Outstanding Kiwi Forward/Centre honours.

On 1 November 2014, Bailey signed with the Southland Sharks for the 2015 New Zealand NBL season. He helped the Sharks win the 2015 championship with a 72–68 grand final victory over the Wellington Saints. In 20 games for the Sharks in 2015, he averaged 10.0 points, 6.8 rebounds and 1.5 assists per game.

On 7 September 2015, Bailey re-signed with the Southland Sharks on a two-year deal. In nine games for the Sharks in the 2016 season, Bailey averaged 8.8 points, 6.1 rebounds and 1.6 assists per game.

Bailey began the 2017 season operating at '70 to 80' percent, as he battled different leg niggles through the Sharks' first eight games. In 19 games for the Sharks in 2017, Bailey averaged 6.9 points, 3.5 rebounds and 1.2 assists per game.

=== New Zealand Breakers ===
In August 2013, Bailey signed with the New Zealand Breakers as a development player for the 2013–14 NBL season. He was elevated to the Breakers' tenth roster spot on 28 October 2013 following the addition of Gary Wilkinson and the release of Darnell Lazare and Jeremiah Trueman. For the season, he appeared in five games and scored a total of six points.

On 9 July 2014, Bailey signed a one-year deal (with the option of a second) with the Breakers. In the 2014–15 season, he appeared in 27 games, averaging 2.0 points and 1.2 rebounds. The Breakers won the Australian NBL championship after defeating the Cairns Taipans 2–1 in the best-of-three grand final series.

On 29 April 2015, the Breakers exercised the team option on Bailey's contract, re-signing him for the 2015–16 season. On 20 October 2015, Bailey was released by the Breakers to make way for Corey Webster, who returned from a stint in the NBA. He appeared in three out of the Breakers first four games of the season, recording two points and five rebounds.

=== Plymouth Raiders ===
On 9 November 2015, Bailey signed with the Plymouth Raiders for the rest of the 2015–16 British Basketball League season. In 24 games for Plymouth, he averaged 10.5 points, 6.8 rebounds and 3.0 assists per game.

=== Brisbane Spartans ===
On 30 May 2016, Bailey signed with the Brisbane Spartans for the rest of the 2016 SEABL season. In 12 games for Brisbane, he averaged 8.4 points, 4.6 rebounds and 1.7 assists per game.

== Personal ==
Bailey has two children.
