= Shea Ili =

New Zealand basketball player (born 1992)

No. 51 – Melbourne United
- Position: Point guard
- League: NBL

Personal information
- Born: 6 October 1992 (age 34) Auckland, New Zealand
- Listed height: 184 cm (6 ft 0 in)
- Listed weight: 88 kg (194 lb)

Career information
- High school: Onehunga (Auckland, New Zealand)
- Playing career: 2012–present

Career history
- 2012: Auckland Pirates
- 2013: Super City Rangers
- 2014–2015: Southland Sharks
- 2014–2019: New Zealand Breakers
- 2016–2019: Wellington Saints
- 2019–present: Melbourne United
- 2021: Geelong Supercats
- 2022; 2024: Sandringham Sabres
- 2025: Wellington Saints
- 2026: Sandringham Sabres

Career highlights
- 2× NBL champion (2015, 2021); 2× NBL Best Defensive Player (2024, 2025); NBL Best Sixth Man (2022); NBL Most Improved Player (2018); 6× NZNBL champion (2012, 2015–2017, 2019, 2025); NZNBL MVP (2018); NZNBL Kiwi MVP (2018); NZNBL Finals MVP (2017); 3× NZNBL All-Star Five (2017–2019); NZNBL Most Outstanding Guard (2018); 3× NZNBL Most Outstanding Kiwi Guard (2016, 2018, 2019); NBL1 South MVP (2022); NBL1 South All-Star Five (2022); NBL1 South Defensive Player of the Year (2022)
Medals
Representing New Zealand
Men's basketball
Commonwealth Games
Bronze medal – third place	2018 Gold Coast	Team competition

Shea Ulima Stephen Ili (born 6 October 1992) is a New Zealand professional basketball player for Melbourne United of the Australian National Basketball League (NBL). He debuted in the Australian NBL in 2014 with the New Zealand Breakers. He was a member of the Breakers' championship-winning team in 2015 and in 2018 he named the NBL Most Improved Player. He joined Melbourne United in 2019 and in 2021 he won his second NBL championship. He was named NBL Best Sixth Man in 2022 and NBL Best Defensive Player in 2024.

In the New Zealand National Basketball League (NZNBL), Ili has won six championships and earned league MVP in 2018. In the NBL1 South, he won league MVP in 2022.

== Early life and career ==
Ili was born in Auckland, New Zealand, in the suburb of Māngere Bridge. He attended Onehunga High School, where he played basketball and rugby. As a halfback, he progressed to the Auckland under-21 team, but his rugby ambitions were put to aside because of his basketball commitments.

As a youth, Ili competed for Counties Manukau Basketball Association rep teams. In 2011, he was named in the U21 Men's National Championship Tournament Team; in 2013, he was named in the U23 Men's National Championship Tournament Team; and in 2014, he helped Counties Manukau win the U23 Men's National Championship title while being named in the Tournament Team.

== Professional career ==
=== Australian NBL ===
==== New Zealand Breakers (2014–2019) ====
In August 2014, Ili joined the New Zealand Breakers of the Australian National Basketball League (NBL) as a development player for the 2014–15 season. A former Breakers Academy player in 2011, Ili was highly rated by the Breakers for his athleticism, work rate and attitude. Ili was an active member of the Breakers roster for eight games during the 2014–15 season and made five appearances. In March 2015, he became a championship-winning player with the Breakers after they defeated the Cairns Taipans in the NBL Grand Final series.

Ili re-joined the Breakers as a development player for the 2015–16 NBL season. He stepped into the backcourt rotation during the pre-season. Ili was given minutes on a regular basis for the Breakers towards the end of the season, including during the playoffs. In 20 games for the Breakers in 2015–16, he averaged 1.7 points and 1.3 rebounds per game.

On 27 April 2016, Ili signed a full-time contract with the Breakers. A back injury in the lead up to the 2016–17 NBL season saw him miss three months of action. In 17 games, he averaged 4.4 points, 1.9 rebounds and 1.5 assists per game.

Ili had a breakout start to the 2017–18 NBL season. On 26 October 2017, he scored a career-high 23 points in a 101–96 win over the Brisbane Bullets. For the season, Ili was named the NBL Most Improved Player after averaging 9.2 points, 3.1 assists and 2.9 rebounds in 21.5 minutes per game.

On 22 March 2018, Ili re-signed with the Breakers on a two-year deal. During the off-season, he attended an NBA mini-camp run by the Dallas Mavericks. While he struggled offensively during the 2018–19 season, Ili's defence was a highlight, proving himself to be one of the best stoppers in the league. On 30 December 2018, he scored a season-high 19 points in a 109–98 loss to the Adelaide 36ers. On 3 February 2019, he scored 18 points in a 111–102 overtime loss to Melbourne United. In 27 games, Ili averaged 7.9 points, 2.5 rebounds and 2.8 assists per game.

On 19 June 2019, Ili requested a release from the final year of his contract with the Breakers in order to pursue more minutes at another NBL club.

==== Melbourne United (2019–present) ====
On 20 June 2019, Ili signed a two-year deal with Melbourne United. Despite a 0–3 start for Melbourne to begin the 2019–20 season, Ili helped the team recover to a 4–4 record after round 6. A minor calf injury to Ili in round 8 saw him miss two round 9 games. Ili was moved into the starting line-up during United's 2–1 semi-final series loss to the Sydney Kings. In 29 games, he averaged 6.4 points, 2.1 rebounds and 2.2 assists per game.

The 2020–21 NBL season began in January 2021. Ili missed the majority of February 2021 with a left ankle injury. He helped United win the 2020–21 championship and shot a career-high 43.2% from 3-point range.

On 27 June 2021, Ili re-signed with United on a two-year deal. In the 2021–22 NBL season, he was a finalist for best defender and earned the NBL Best Sixth Man Award after averaging a career high in assists and steals off the bench, while shooting the ball at above 41% from 3-point range for the second consecutive year. United lost 2–1 in the semi-finals to the Tasmania JackJumpers despite Ili's team-high 18 points in game three.

On 26 July 2022, Ili signed a two-year contract extension with United. During the 2022 pre-season, he suffered a concussion which lingered until December. He suffered another concussion in January 2023. For the 2022–23 season, he was once again named a finalist for best defender.

In the 2023–24 season, Ili was named the NBL Best Defensive Player. United finished as minor premiers and reached the NBL Grand Final series, where they lost 3–2 to the Tasmania JackJumpers.

Ili missed two rounds early in the 2024–25 season with a calf injury. He went on to earn NBL Best Defensive Player honours for the second straight year. He helped United reach the grand final series, where in game two against the Illawarra Hawks, he suffered a head knock during the second quarter and missed the second half of the game. He was subsequently ruled out of game three and game four due to concussion protocols. He returned to the line-up in game five and had 20 points, six assists and four steals, but United finished as runners-up with a 3–2 series defeat following a 114–104 loss.

On 7 April 2025, Ili re-signed with United on a two-year deal. He missed the pre-season blitz due to minor concussion symptoms. Prior to the start of the 2025–26 season, he was named United vice captain alongside Kyle Bowen. He sustained a right hamstring injury in United's exhibition game against the New Orleans Pelicans in Melbourne on 3 October, which sidelined him until mid November after missing nine games. After a one-game return, he was sidelined again, this time due to a left hamstring injury sustained at training. He returned to action on 12 December but suffered another hamstring injury on 18 December. He returned to action on 30 January 2026 but suffered another left hamstring injury on 12 February, which ruled him out for the rest of the regular season. He appeared in just 10 games. He re-joined United for their Play-In Qualifier on 5 March.

Ili missed the 2026–27 season opener due to a hamstring injury.

=== New Zealand NBL and NBL1 South ===
Ili made his debut in the New Zealand National Basketball League (NZNBL) in 2012 with the championship-winning Auckland Pirates. He joined the Super City Rangers for the 2013 season and was one of their standouts despite them winning just two games. In 15 games for the Rangers, he averaged 10.9 points, 3.7 rebounds, 2.1 assists and 1.3 steals per game.

Ili joined the Southland Sharks for the 2014 season. However, he appeared in just 10 games after he was suspended indefinitely by the team in late May following a fight outside a bar in New Plymouth that he and teammates Reuben Te Rangi and Leon Henry were involved in. The trio were stood down by the team for the second half of the season, and in June, all three pleaded guilty to attacking bar staff. Ili pleaded guilty to two charges: common assault and assault with intent to injure. In August, Henry and Ili agreed to carry out clinics in Taranaki. Neither wanted a discharge without conviction. Ili received a four-month sentence of community detention and was ordered to pay reparation of $750 to one victim and $500 to the other.

The Sharks welcomed back Ili for the 2015 season and he subsequently began to show his athletic prowess. On 19 June 2015, Ili scored a career-high 24 points off the bench in a 101–91 win over the Manawatu Jets. He helped the Sharks reach the grand final, where they defeated the Wellington Saints 72–68 to win the championship. Ili appeared in all 20 games for the Sharks in 2015, averaging 9.4 points, 4.3 rebounds and 3.6 assists per game.

Ili joined the Wellington Saints for the 2016 season. On 22 May 2016, Ili scored a career-high 28 points in the Saints' 78–75 loss to the Southland Sharks. Six days later, he had a game-high 25 points in a 96–83 win over the Nelson Giants. He helped the Saints reach the grand final, where they defeated the Super City Rangers 94–82 to win the championship. Ili appeared in 19 games for the Saints in 2016, averaging career highs in points (14.8) and assists (5.5), to go with 3.4 rebounds and 1.1 steals. He missed one game during the season to attend his own wedding. For the season, he was named the league's Most Outstanding Kiwi Guard.

Ili returned to the Saints for the 2017 season. He had a pass-first approach but had greatly improved his shooting over the previous 12 months. On 17 April, he had 22 points and 15 assists in a 102–79 win over the Canterbury Rams. On 25 April, he had 27 points, 10 assists and six steals in a 110–84 win over the Nelson Giants. On 19 May, he scored a career-high 30 points in a 109–94 win over the Southland Sharks. He helped the Saints return to the grand final, where he set a new career high with 31 points in a 108–75 win over the Sharks to win another championship. He subsequently earned Finals MVP honours. He was also named All-Star Five. For the season, he averaged career highs with 16.1 points, 6.5 assists and 2.3 steals, to go with 4.2 rebounds while appearing in all 20 games.

Ili re-joined the Saints for the 2018 season. In the Saints' season opener on 27 April, Ili recorded game highs of 32 points and 10 assists in a 113–108 loss to the Southland Sharks. He went on to earn Player of the Week honours for rounds five and seven. He helped the Saints reach the grand final, where they lost 98–96 loss to the Sharks, despite Ili's game-high 27 points. In 19 games, he averaged a career-high 22.2 points to go with 4.4 rebounds, 6.2 assists and 1.8 steals per game. He was subsequently named league MVP.

Ili re-joined the Saints for the 2019 season and quickly cemented himself as an MVP favourite. In the Saints' semi-final against the Southland Sharks, Ili scored a game-high 32 points in a 95–89 win. In the grand final, Ili had nine points, eight assists and five rebounds in a 78–68 victory over the Hawke's Bay Hawks to help the Saints win another championship. For the season, Ili was named Most Outstanding Kiwi Guard and All-Star Five.

In 2021, Ili had a three-game stint with the Geelong Supercats of the NBL1 South. He joined the Sandringham Sabres of the NBL1 South for the 2022 season and won league MVP and Defensive Player of the Year. After missing the 2023 NBL1 season due to concussion precautions, Ili re-joined the Sandringham Sabres for the 2024 season and averaged 17.9 points and 4.4 rebounds per game.

In September 2024, it was reported that Ili would return to the Sabres for the 2025 NBL1 season. However, in January 2025, Ili signed with the Wellington Saints for the 2025 New Zealand NBL season. He was ruled out for the rest of the season on 26 June 2025 following a head knock. The Saints went on to win the 2025 NZNBL championship.

In May 2026, Ili joined the Sabres. In seven games during the 2026 NBL1 South season, he averaged 13.43 points, 2.14 rebounds and 3.86 assists per game.

== National team career ==
In June 2015, Ili was named in a 22-man Tall Blacks squad to trial and be considered for selection for the Oceania Series against Australia in August. A month later, he was named in the final squad ahead of the team's European tour, going on to play in Game 2 of New Zealand's Oceania Series against Australia.

In July 2016, Ili competed for New Zealand at the FIBA World Olympic Qualifying Tournament in Manila. Over the three games they played, Ili averaged 3.7 points, 3.7 rebounds and 3.0 assists per game. It was later discovered that Ili had played through a stress fracture in his back on the Tall Blacks' tour through China, Europe and the Philippines.

On 12 July 2017, Ili was invited to a six-day Tall Blacks camp in Auckland, ahead of a final 12-man roster being named to travel to the FIBA Asia Cup in Lebanon, via preparation matches in China. Ili went on to average a team-high 15.5 points, 5.8 assists and 2.2 rebounds for the Tall Blacks during the FIBA Asia Cup, and was subsequently named to the tournament's All-Star Five. The Tall Blacks finished the tournament in fourth place after losing to South Korea in the bronze medal game; Ili missed the game after splitting the webbing on his hand during the semi-final defeat to Australia.

In November 2017 and February 2018, Ili represented the Tall Blacks during the 2019 FIBA Basketball World Cup qualifiers. On 16 March 2018, he was named in the Tall Blacks squad for the Commonwealth Games. He helped the Tall Blacks win bronze at the Commonwealth Games. In May 2018, he won both the outstanding New Zealand men's player and the 2017 MVP award at Basketball New Zealand's annual awards night. In August 2018, he re-joined the Tall Blacks for two more qualifiers in September.

Ili played at the 2019 FIBA World Cup and took part in qualifiers in 2021 and 2022.

In July 2023, Ili was named in the Tall Blacks squad for the 2023 FIBA World Cup. In May 2024, he won both the New Zealand male player of the year and the 2023 MVP award at Basketball New Zealand's annual awards night.

In May 2025, Ili was named in the Tall Blacks squad for a trans-Tasman series against Australia.

In November 2025, Ili was named in the Tall Blacks squad for the first window of the FIBA Basketball World Cup 2027 Asian Qualifiers. He was later replaced in the squad by Taine Murray due to injury. In June 2026, he was named in the squad for two more Asian qualifiers. In August 2026, he was named in the Tall Blacks squad for the next Asian qualifier window. In November 2026, he was named in the squad for two more Asian qualifiers.

== Personal life ==
Ili is of Samoan descent. His father and members of his mother's family hail from Samoa. His older brother, Stacey, is a professional rugby union player.

In March 2016, Ili married Morgan Roberts, a former Oregon Tech University basketball scholarship holder. The couple have two children.
