= Luke Martin =

Australian basketball player (born 1981)

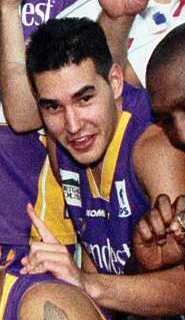
- Martin in March 2005

Personal information
- Born: 22 January 1981 (age 45) Sydney, New South Wales, Australia
- Listed height: 181 cm (5 ft 11 in)
- Listed weight: 82 kg (181 lb)

Career information
- High school: St. John's College HS (Washington, D.C.)
- College: UTEP (2001–2002)
- Playing career: 2002–2015
- Position: Point guard

Career history
- 2002–2003: West Sydney Razorbacks
- 2003–2006: Sydney Kings
- 2004: Manawatu Jets
- 2005–2007: Waikato Titans/Pistons
- 2006–2007: Cairns Taipans
- 2007–2008: South Dragons
- 2008–2009: Wellington Saints
- 2008–2009: Sydney Spirit
- 2009: Parramatta Wildcats
- 2010: Wollongong Hawks
- 2010: Southland Sharks
- 2010–2013: Sydney Kings
- 2011: Auckland Pirates
- 2013–2014: Southland Sharks
- 2015: Perth Wildcats
- 2015: Brisbane Spartans

Career highlights
- NZNBL champion (2013); 2× NBL champion (2004, 2005); Waratah League champion (2009); Waratah League Grand Final MVP (2009); NZNBL Rookie of the Year (2004)

Luke Leonard Martin (born 22 January 1981) is an Australian former professional basketball player who spent the majority of his career playing in the National Basketball League (NBL). In 2004 and 2005, he represented the Australian national team.

== Early life ==
Born and raised in Sydney to a Kiwi father and an Australian mother, Martin moved to the United States in 1998, where he attended St. John's College High School in Washington, D.C. before playing one season of college basketball for the UTEP Miners in 2001–02. In 23 games for the Miners, he averaged 2.9 points and 1.6 assists per game.

== Professional career ==
=== ANBL ===
Martin returned to Australia in 2002 and joined the West Sydney Razorbacks for the 2002–03 season. After just one season with the Razorbacks, he moved across town and joined the Sydney Kings. He went on to win two championships with the Kings in his first two seasons before injury struck him down for the 2005–06 season. He missed much of the season with a broken foot he suffered while playing for the Australian Boomers in a tour to China. Martin joined the Cairns Taipans for the 2006–07 season before moving to Melbourne and signing with the South Dragons for the 2007–08 season. Martin then moved back to Sydney and signed with the Sydney Spirit for the 2008–09 season.

In January 2010, Martin signed with the Wollongong Hawks, where he spent the rest of the 2009–10 season as an injury replacement for Tywain McKee.

For their return season to the NBL, Martin joined the resurrected Sydney Kings for the 2010–11 season. He spent three seasons with the Kings.

On 16 January 2015, Martin signed with the Perth Wildcats as an injury replacement for Earnest Ross. On 7 March 2015, he was released by the Wildcats following the club's lacklustre season and a subsequent overhaul of personnel.

=== NZNBL ===
Martin began playing in the New Zealand National Basketball League in 2004 for the Manawatu Jets. He then played three seasons for the Waikato Titans/Pistons from 2005 to 2007, before playing two seasons for the Wellington Saints in 2008 and 2009. Following the 2009 NZNBL season, he joined the Parramatta Wildcats and helped the team win the Waratah League Championship while earning Grand Final MVP honours.

In December 2009, Martin signed with the newly established Southland Sharks for the 2010 season. After one season with the Sharks, he joined the Auckland Pirates for the 2011 season.

After not playing in New Zealand in 2012, Martin returned to the Southland Sharks for the 2013 season. In December 2013, he re-signed with the Sharks for the 2014 season.

=== SEABL ===
In March 2015, Martin joined the Brisbane Spartans for the 2015 SEABL season. Due to the Lindt cafe incident, Martin was stood down by the Spartans. In 10 games for Brisbane, he averaged 8.4 points, 3.4 rebounds and 3.2 assists per game.

== Personal ==
On 3 June 2015, Martin was denied bail over allegedly throwing rocks through the windows of Sydney's Lindt cafe in Martin Place, and breaking a police officer's jaw during the subsequent arrest. He was also observed driving erratically in Sydney CBD. He was later admitted to a mental health facility.
