= Hayden Allen =

New Zealand basketball player (born 1979)

Personal information
- Born: 10 November 1979 (age 47) Dunedin, New Zealand
- Listed height: 190 cm (6 ft 3 in)
- Listed weight: 92 kg (203 lb)

Career information
- High school: King's (Dunedin, New Zealand)
- Playing career: 1998–2017
- Position: Point guard / shooting guard

Career history
- 1998–2001: Otago Nuggets
- 2002: Waikato Titans
- 2003–2004: Otago Nuggets
- 2004–2005: New Zealand Breakers
- 2005–2008: Harbour Heat
- 2007–2008: Singapore Slingers
- 2009: Auckland Stars
- 2010–2011: Waikato Pistons
- 2012: Auckland Pirates
- 2013: Otago Nuggets
- 2015: Super City Rangers
- 2016–2017: Southland Sharks

Career highlights
- 2× NBL champion (2002, 2012); NBL Co-Most Outstanding Kiwi Guard (2007); NBL All-Star Five (2001)

Hayden James Allen (born 10 November 1979) is a New Zealand former professional basketball player who spent the majority of his career in the National Basketball League (NBL). He played close to 300 games and scored over 4000 points in his NBL career.

== Professional career ==
Allen debuted as a teenager for the Otago Nuggets in 1998 and enjoyed his best season with the club in 2001, when he averaged 20 points per game and was named in the All-Star Five. His first championship title came the following year in 2002 with the Waikato Titans. He returned to Otago for the 2003 and 2004 seasons before joining the New Zealand Breakers as a development player for the 2004–05 NBL season. He went on to play three seasons for the Harbour Heat while also joining the Singapore Slingers for the 2007–08 NBL season.

In 2009, Allen joined the Auckland Stars before returning to Waikato to play with the Pistons in 2010 and 2011. Allen's second championship came in 2012 with the Auckland Pirates. In 2013, Allen returned to Otago to play for the Nuggets once again.

After taking a year off from basketball, Allen signed with the Super City Rangers for the 2015 NBL season on 1 December 2014.

On 1 April 2016, Allen signed with the Southland Sharks for the rest of the 2016 NBL season. On 25 January 2017, he re-signed with the Sharks for the 2017 season. Allen battled a groin injury for much of the 2017 season. On 22 November 2017, he re-signed with the Sharks for the 2018 season. However, he later retired prior to the start of the season.

== National team career ==
In 2012, Allen earned his first Tall Blacks selection to compete at the FIBA World Olympic Qualifying Tournament in Venezuela. He was able to finally follow in the footsteps of his father, Glen, who represented New Zealand in 1973.

== Personal ==
Allen and his wife, Natalie, have three children.

On 12 August 2011, Allen was involved in a horrific car accident along with Pistons' teammate Dan Ryan. He was a non-seatbelt wearing passenger in a speeding car that smashed into a wall on the Auckland Harbour Bridge, sending him hurtling through a window and skimming along State Highway 1. Just days from the birth of his first-born, son Reggie, Allen woke up in a hospital bed with stern-faced medics telling him how close he had come to never waking up. Allen says it changed his outlook on life as he looks back at the incident with a perspective that only those who have truly faced their mortality can understand.
