= Tai Webster =

New Zealand basketball player (born 1995)

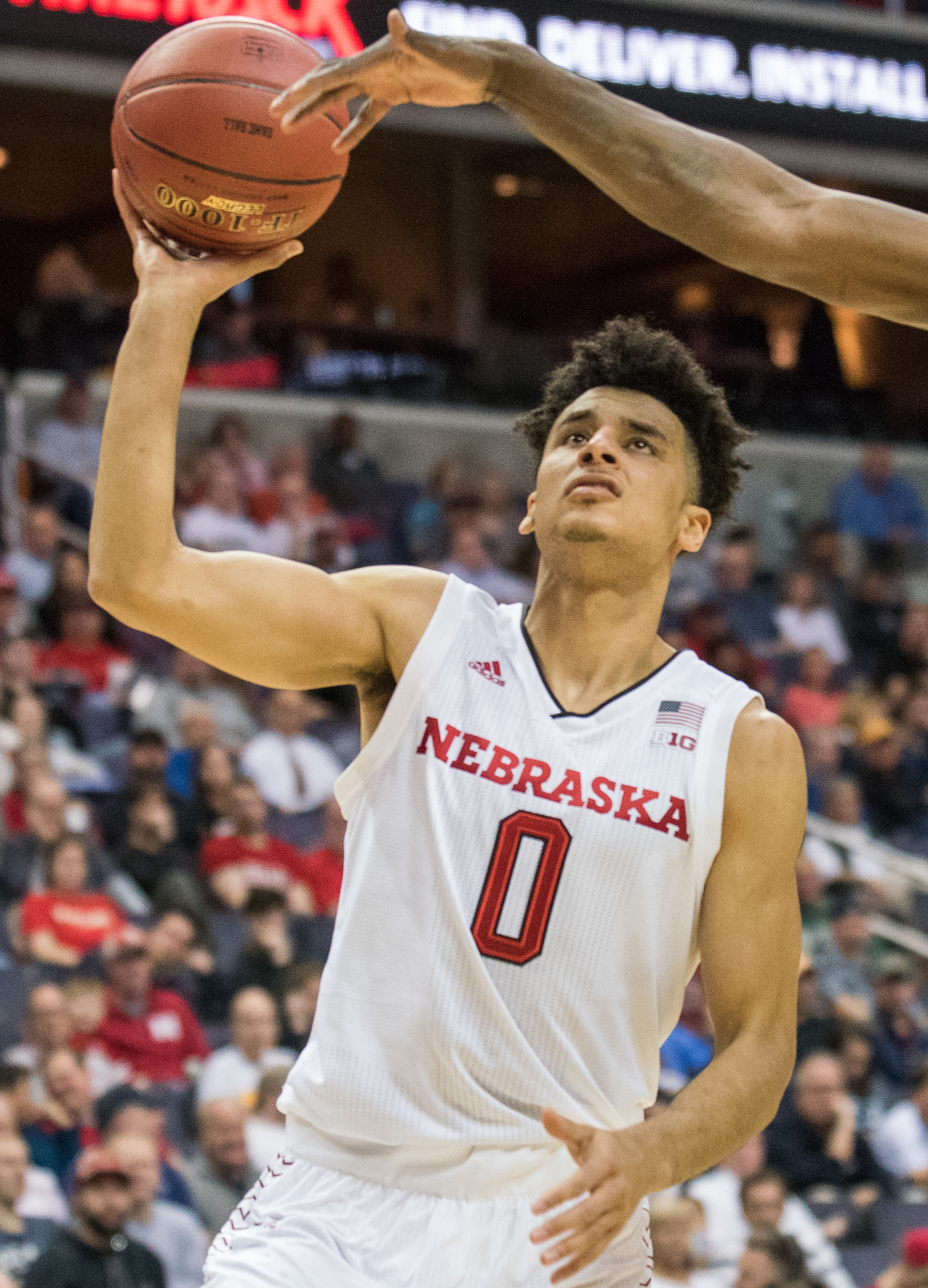
- Webster with the Nebraska Cornhuskers in 2017

No. 9 – Limoges CSP
- Position: Point guard / shooting guard
- League: LNB Élite

Personal information
- Born: 29 May 1995 (age 31) Auckland, New Zealand
- Listed height: 193 cm (6 ft 4 in)
- Listed weight: 89 kg (196 lb)

Career information
- High school: Westlake Boys (Auckland, New Zealand)
- College: Nebraska (2013–2017)
- NBA draft: 2017: undrafted
- Playing career: 2012–present

Career history
- 2012: Auckland Pirates
- 2012–2013: New Zealand Breakers
- 2013: Waikato Pistons
- 2017–2018: Skyliners Frankfurt
- 2018–2020: Galatasaray
- 2020–2021: New Zealand Breakers
- 2021–2022: Žalgiris Kaunas
- 2022: Petkim Spor
- 2023–2025: Perth Wildcats
- 2023–2024: Otago Nuggets
- 2025: JL Bourg Basket
- 2025–2026: New Zealand Breakers
- 2026: Manawatu Jets
- 2026–present: Limoges CSP

Career highlights
- NBL champion (2013); NBL Ignite Cup winner (2026); King Mindaugas Cup winner (2022); NZNBL champion (2012); NZNBL Rookie of the Year (2013); Second-team All-Big Ten (2017)

Tai Jack Webster (born 29 May 1995) is a New Zealand professional basketball player for Limoges CSP of the French LNB Élite. After starting his career in New Zealand, Webster played college basketball for the Nebraska Cornhuskers, earning second-team All-Big Ten as a senior in 2017. He went on to play professionally in Germany and Turkey before having a season with the New Zealand Breakers in the Australian National Basketball League (NBL) in 2020–21. After playing in Lithuania and again in Turkey, he joined the Perth Wildcats in 2023.

== Early career ==
Webster was born in Auckland, New Zealand, in the suburb of Takapuna. He attended Westlake Boys High School and played for North Harbour Basketball.

Webster joined the Auckland Pirates of the New Zealand National Basketball League (NZNBL) for the 2012 season, playing two games for a team that won the championship. He subsequently joined the New Zealand Breakers of the Australian NBL as a non-contracted development player for the 2012–13 NBL season.

In December 2012, Webster signed a National Letter of Intent to play college basketball at the University of Nebraska–Lincoln. He had never heard of Nebraska when he was recruited, but signed with the team anyway.

Webster joined the Waikato Pistons for the 2013 New Zealand NBL season. In 15 games, he averaged 18.5 points, 3.9 rebounds, 4.4 assists and 2.0 steals per game.

== College career ==
=== Freshman year ===
As a freshman for the Nebraska Cornhuskers in 2013–14, Webster was an immediate contributor, averaging 3.9 points, 2.1 rebounds and 2.0 assists in 32 games (30 starts) while helping the Huskers reach the NCAA Tournament for the first time since 1998. He led Nebraska with 63 assists and was also among the team leaders in steals. Webster reached double figures four times, including a season-high 14 points against Georgia, and paced the squad in assists eight times. His season-best was five assists on three occasions.

=== Sophomore year ===
As a sophomore in 2014–15, Webster backed up starters Terran Petteway and Shavon Shields. In 30 games (four starts), he averaged 3.9 points, 1.9 rebounds and 1.2 assists in 18.4 minutes per game. Webster called the season "hugely disappointing" since his work in practice did not translate to higher production than as a freshman.

=== Junior year ===
As a junior in 2015–16, Webster joined the Nebraska starting lineup. He averaged 10.1 points, 4.1 rebounds and 1.9 assists in 27.7 minutes per game.

=== Senior year ===
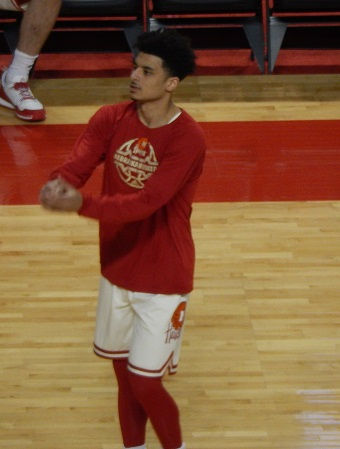
Webster warming up with the Nebraska Cornhuskers in 2017

As a senior in 2016–17, Webster averaged 17.0 points, 5.1 rebounds and 4.0 assists in 34.7 minutes per game. Leading up to the NBA draft, many thought Webster could be a "second-round sleeper."

== Professional career ==
After going undrafted in the 2017 NBA draft, Webster played for the Golden State Warriors during the 2017 NBA Summer League in Las Vegas. He later signed with the Skyliners Frankfurt in Germany for the 2017–18 season. He posted 14.9 points, 3.6 rebounds, and 3.8 assists per game in his rookie season.

On 7 August 2018, Webster signed with the Turkish team Galatasaray. He re-signed with Galatasaray on 7 August 2019.

On 15 July 2020, Webster signed a one-year contract with the New Zealand Breakers, returning to the team for a second stint. On 9 April 2021, he was ruled out for four weeks with an Achilles injury. Webster averaged 17.2 points, 4.9 rebounds, and 4.9 assists per game during the 2020–21 season.

On 11 July 2021, Webster re-signed with the Breakers on a two-year deal. However, on 20 September 2021, he was released by the Breakers reportedly due to his refusal to get the COVID-19 vaccine.

On 2 November 2021, Webster signed with Lithuanian team Žalgiris Kaunas for the rest of the 2021–22 season.

On 31 July 2022, Webster signed with Petkim Spor of the Turkish Basketball Super League. He was released on 30 December 2022.

On 2 January 2023, Webster signed with the Perth Wildcats in Australia for the rest of the 2022–23 NBL season. He played for the Otago Nuggets during the 2023 New Zealand NBL season.

Webster returned to the Wildcats for the 2023–24 NBL season and averaged 8.9 points, 2.8 rebounds, 2.7 assists and 0.9 steals per game, while shooting at 46 per cent from the field.

Webster re-joined the Nuggets for the 2024 New Zealand NBL season. On 2 May 2024, he scored a career-high 40 points in a 96–85 loss to the Canterbury Rams.

Webster re-joined the Wildcats for 2024–25 NBL season. He missed five games over the first half of the season and then on 19 December 2024, he was ruled out for six weeks with a hamstring injury.

On 6 March 2025, Webster signed with JL Bourg Basket of the French LNB Élite for the rest of the 2024–25 season.

On 2 December 2025, Webster signed with New Zealand Breakers as an injury replacement for Izayah Le'afa. He missed the NBL Ignite Cup Final, which the Breakers won 111–107 over the Adelaide 36ers.

In May 2026, Webster joined the Manawatu Jets for the rest of the 2026 New Zealand NBL season.

On 22 July 2026, Webster signed with Limoges CSP of French LNB Élite for the 2026–27 season.

== National team career ==
In 2012, Webster represented New Zealand at the FIBA World Olympic Qualifying Tournament, where he averaged 13.5 points per game. He went on to represent New Zealand at the 2014 FIBA Basketball World Cup and the 2016 FIBA World Olympic Qualifying Tournament.

In June 2026, Webster was named in the Tall Blacks squad for the third window of the FIBA Basketball World Cup 2027 Asian Qualifiers. In August 2026, he was named in the Tall Blacks squad for the next Asian qualifier window.

== Career statistics ==
Legend
| GP | Games played | GS | Games started | MPG | Minutes per game |
| FG% | Field-goal percentage | 3P% | 3-point field-goal percentage | FT% | Free-throw percentage |
| RPG | Rebounds per game | APG | Assists per game | SPG | Steals per game |
| BPG | Blocks per game | PPG | Points per game | PIR | Performance index rating |
| **Bold** | Career high |

=== EuroLeague ===
| Year | Team | GP | GS | MPG | FG% | 3P% | FT% | RPG | APG | SPG | BPG | PPG | PIR |
|---|---|---|---|---|---|---|---|---|---|---|---|---|---|
| 2021–22 | Žalgiris | 21 | 7 | 12.5 | .326 | .222 | .739 | .9 | 1.6 | .3 | .1 | 4.0 | 2.0 |
| Career | | 21 | 7 | 12.5 | .326 | .222 | .739 | .9 | 1.6 | .3 | .1 | 4.0 | 2.0 |

=== College ===
| Year | Team | GP | GS | MPG | FG% | 3P% | FT% | RPG | APG | SPG | BPG | PPG |
|---|---|---|---|---|---|---|---|---|---|---|---|---|
| 2013–14 | Nebraska | 32 | **30** | 22.8 | .304 | .171 | .619 | 2.1 | 2.0 | 0.8 | 0.1 | 3.9 |
| 2014–15 | Nebraska | 30 | 4 | 18.4 | .358 | .231 | .737 | 1.9 | 1.2 | 0.7 | 0.1 | 3.9 |
| 2015–16 | Nebraska | **34** | 18 | 27.7 | **.474** | **.350** | .740 | 4.1 | 1.9 | **1.4** | **0.4** | 10.1 |
| 2016–17 | Nebraska | 31 | **31** | **34.7** | .421 | .294 | **.744** | **5.1** | **4.0** | **1.4** | 0.1 | **17.0** |
| **Career** | | 127 | 83 | 25.9 | .414 | .279 | .715 | 3.3 | 2.3 | 1.0 | 0.2 | 8.8 |

== Personal life ==
Webster is the son of Tony and Cherry Webster. His father played college basketball for Hawaii and played professionally in New Zealand. His older brother, Corey, also plays professional basketball.

Webster holds dual citizenship with New Zealand and the United States.

As of January 2024, Webster had a son. In May 2024, he joined his partner in the U.S. ahead of the birth of their child.
