= Josh Pace =

American basketball player and coach (born 1983)

Old Dominion Monarchs
- Title: Assistant coach
- League: Sun Belt Conference

Personal information
- Born: May 23, 1983 (age 43) Griffin, Georgia, U.S.
- Listed height: 6 ft 5 in (1.96 m)
- Listed weight: 198 lb (90 kg)

Career information
- High school: Griffin (Griffin, Georgia)
- College: Syracuse (2001–2005)
- NBA draft: 2005: undrafted
- Playing career: 2005–2015
- Position: Shooting guard / small forward

Career history

Playing
- 2006–2007: Nelson Giants
- 2006: Kouvot Kouvola
- 2007–2008: East Kentucky Miners
- 2008–2009: BC Kalev
- 2009–2011: Southeast Texas Mavericks
- 2010–2011: Hawke's Bay Hawks
- 2012: Manawatu Jets
- 2013–2014: Nelson Giants
- 2013–2014: Townsville Crocodiles
- 2014–2015: Shreveport-Bossier Mavericks

Coaching
- 2015–2019: Pepperdine (women's assistant)
- 2019–2020: Western New Mexico (women's assistant)
- 2020–2023: Western New Mexico (women's)
- 2024–present: Old Dominion (women's assistant)

Career highlights
- ABA champion (2015); 2× ABA Most Valuable Player (2010, 2015); 2× ABA All-Star (2010, 2011); 2× All-ABA First Team (2010, 2015); CBA All-Star (2008); All-CBA Second Team (2008); CBA scoring champion (2008); NZNBL champion (2007); NZNBL MVP (2007); 4× NZNBL All-Star Five (2006, 2007, 2012, 2013); 2× NZNBL scoring champion (2012, 2013); KML champion (2009); NCAA champion (2003)

Joshua Michael Pace (born May 23, 1983) is an American former professional basketball player who spent the majority of his ten-year career playing in the New Zealand National Basketball League. He also had successful stints playing college basketball for Syracuse and playing in the ABA for the Mavericks. He currently serves as an assistant coach for the Old Dominion Monarchs women's basketball team.

== High school career ==
Pace was born in Griffin, Georgia. He attended Griffin High School, where as a senior in 2000–01, he averaged 26.0 points, 9.7 rebounds and three steals per game. His honors in high school included four selections each to the all-region and all-state teams, regional player of the year twice, and selection in the Street & Smith’s and Nike All-American clubs.

== College career ==
=== 2001–02 ===
In his freshman year at Syracuse, Pace finished seventh on the team in scoring average (4.3) and fifth in steals average (0.9), appearing in 32 of 36 games.

=== 2002–03 ===
Pace was an important part of Syracuse's 2003 National Championship run as a key player off the bench, including a season-high 14 points against Auburn in the Sweet 16 and 12 points against Texas in the national semifinals. In the National Championship game against Kansas, Pace scored eight points and grabbed eight rebounds. During the NCAA Tournament, Pace averaged 8.0 points, 3.7 rebounds, 1.8 assists and 1.2 steals, and he connected on .639 percent (23-of-36) of his shots.

=== 2003–04 ===
Pace became the team's starting small forward his junior year following Carmelo Anthony declaring early for the NBA draft. Pace also saw time at shooting guard while more than doubling his scoring average from the previous season (4.3 to 9.5) and his minutes played from 14.7 average per game to 33.9.

=== 2004–05 ===
In his senior season, Pace averaged 10.8 points per game, including a career-high 22 points against Rice. Pace was awarded the Big East Conference Sportsmanship Award. When Pace reached double-digits in scoring, Syracuse went 20–4. He was also earned All-Big East Honorable Mention selection and was named to the Big East All-Tournament Team.

Pace finished with career averages of 7.3 points, 3.8 rebounds and 2.4 assists per game. He played in 129 games, starting 65 of them.

== Professional career ==
=== Early years ===
After going undrafted in the 2005 NBA draft, Pace joined the Utah Jazz for the 2005 NBA Summer League. Pace later joined the Nelson Giants for the 2006 New Zealand NBL season where he earned league All-Star five honors and was named Round 10 Player of the Week. In 18 regular season games for the Giants, Pace averaged 19.1 points, 6.6 rebounds, 3.5 assists and 1.4 steals per game. He went on to score 32 points in a losing semi-final effort to the eventual champions Hawke's Bay Hawks.

Following his stint with Nelson, Pace moved to Finland where he joined Kouvot for the 2006–07 Korisliiga season. However, his stint with Kouvot lasted only half a season as he departed the club in December 2006 and returned to New Zealand to re-join the Nelson Giants. Pace went on to have a memorable 2007 season with the Giants as he earned league MVP honors after averaging 22.4 points, 8.1 rebounds, 4.3 assists and 1.3 steals in 18 regular season games. In three post season games, he averaged 28.3 points per game in leading the Giants to their first championship since 1998.

=== CBA and Estonia ===
In November 2007, Pace became a starter for CBA expansion team, the East Kentucky Miners, based in Pikeville, Kentucky. Pace appeared in 45 games for the Miners in 2007–08, and finished leading the team in scoring (23.0 ppg) while also posting averages of 7.1 rebounds and 4.4 assists per game. He earned All-CBA Second Team honors and played in the 2008 CBA All-Star Game.

In June 2008, Pace received invitations to try out for the Golden State Warriors, Miami Heat and Indiana Pacers. Pace did not receive an offer from any of the teams, and later signed with BC Kalev/Cramo of Estonia on July 16, 2008. With the team, he won the 2008–09 season Estonian National Championship and the Estonian National Cup. In 17 Estonian League games, Pace averaged 9.6 points, 4.5 rebounds, 1.6 assists and 1.0 steals per game.

=== ABA and New Zealand ===
==== 2009–2011 ====
In 2009–10, Pace played for the Southeast Texas Mavericks of the American Basketball Association where he earned ABA MVP and All-ABA First Team honors, and played in the 2010 ABA All-Star Game. Following the 2009–10 ABA season, Pace returned to New Zealand and joined the Hawke's Bay Hawks for the 2010 New Zealand NBL season. In 12 regular season games for the Hawks in 2010, Pace averaged 19.8 points, 4.5 rebounds, 3.9 assists and 1.1 steals per game. He went on to score 28 points in a quarter-final win over the Harbour Heat, and 30 points in a semi-final loss to the eventual champions Wellington Saints to finish with a scoring average of 21.1 points in 14 total games.

Pace returned to the Southeast Texas Mavericks for the 2010–11 ABA season, and after the season, re-joined the Hawke's Bay Hawks again for the 2011 New Zealand NBL season. In 17 total games for the Hawks in 2011, Pace averaged 19.0 points, 6.2 rebounds and 2.7 assists per game.

==== 2012–2014 ====
For the 2012 New Zealand NBL season, Pace signed with the Manawatu Jets and played for head coach Ryan Weisenberg. On April 27, 2012, he recorded a triple-double with 21 points, 12 rebounds and 10 assists in a win over the Wellington Saints. Pace had a fantastic season, finishing regular season play as the league's leading scorer with 23.0 points per game. He also earned All-Star five honors for the third time in his career. In 16 total games for the Jets in 2012, Pace averaged 23.1 points, 7.3 rebounds, 3.7 assists and 1.5 steals per game.

In January 2013, Pace signed with the Nelson Giants for the 2013 New Zealand NBL season. He went on to earn Player of the Week honors for Round 2 and Round 10, and finished the regular season as the league's leading scorer (22.9 ppg) for the second year in a row. He also earned his fourth career All-Star five selection. He led the Giants back to the grand final where they lost to the Southland Sharks. In 18 total games for the Giants in 2013, Pace averaged 22.7 points, 7.9 rebounds and 2.4 assists per game.

On July 2, 2013, Pace signed with the Townsville Crocodiles for the 2013–14 NBL season. On February 21, 2014, Pace was suspended by the Crocodiles for three games after being involved in a car accident and found to be driving over the limit. In 23 games for the Crocodiles, he averaged 14.9 points, 5.0 rebounds and 1.7 assists per game.

In October 2013, Pace re-signed with the Nelson Giants for the 2014 season. On June 19, 2014, he was named the Player of the Week for Round 11. In his final New Zealand NBL season, Pace appeared in all 19 games for the Giants and averaged 19.9 points, 7.6 rebounds and 2.8 assists per game.

==== Final season ====
In October 2014, Pace joined the Shreveport-Bossier Mavericks for the 2014–15 ABA season. On April 12, 2015, he helped the Mavericks defeat the Miami Midnites to win the 2015 ABA championship. He subsequently earned league MVP honors for the second time in his career after averaging a team-high 17.7 points per game with 7.4 rebounds and 5.8 assists. Following the 2014–15 season, he retired from playing professionally in order to join the coaching ranks.

== Coaching career ==
In July 2015, Pace was hired as an assistant coach by Pepperdine Waves women's basketball team head coach Ryan Weisenberg, Pace's former coach at the Manawatu Jets in 2012.

In August 2019, Pace was hired as the Associate Women's Basketball Coach for the Western New Mexico Mustangs women's basketball team. In March 2020, he was named the head coach.

In June 2024, Pace was hired to be assistant coach for the Old Dominion Monarchs women's basketball team under head coach DeLisha Milton-Jones.

== Personal ==
Pace is the son of Larry and June Pace, and has a younger sister, Alexis.
