= 2012 FIBA World Olympic Qualifying Tournament for Men =

2012 FIBA World Olympic Qualifying Tournament
For Men

Tournament details
- Host country: Venezuela
- Dates: 2–8 July
- Teams: 12
- Venue: 1 (in 1 host city)

Official website
- Venezuela

The 2012 FIBA World Olympic Qualifying Tournament was a men's basketball tournament that consisted of 12 national teams, where the top three teams earned a place in the 2012 Olympics basketball tournament. It was held on 2–8 July 2012 in Caracas, Venezuela.

Lithuania, Russia and Nigeria qualified for the 2012 Olympics through this tournament.

== Qualifying ==
The best non-champions from each of FIBA's 2011 continental championships qualified for this tournament.

- 2011 FIBA Africa Championship
  - Angola
  - Nigeria
- 2011 FIBA Americas Championship
  - Dominican Republic
  - Puerto Rico
  - Venezuela
- 2011 FIBA Asia Championship
  - Jordan
  - South Korea
- 2011 FIBA EuroBasket
  - Greece
  - Lithuania
  - Macedonia
  - Russia
- 2011 FIBA Oceania Championship
  - New Zealand

== Host selection ==
Only the teams that qualified were allowed to bid for hosting. Venezuela were chosen over Angola, Macedonia and Lithuania. The host was determined on a meeting of the FIBA Central Board held on 10–11 December 2011 in Madrid, Spain.

== Participating nations ==
The teams were divided into three pots, corresponding to their continental zones: The draw was held on 31 January 2012 in Caracas.

Pot 1	Pot 2	Pot 3
Russia; Macedonia; Lithuania; Greece	Dominican Republic; Puerto Rico; Venezuela; New Zealand	Angola; Nigeria; Jordan; South Korea

== Format ==
- The teams were divided into four groups (Groups A-D) for the preliminary round.
- Round robin for the preliminary round; the top two teams from each group advanced to the quarterfinals. The last-placed team in each group was eliminated.
- A single-elimination tournament was then held; the quarterfinals pairings were:
  - A1 vs. B2
  - B1 vs. A2
  - C1 vs. D2
  - D1 vs. C2
- The semifinal pairings were A1/B2 vs. C1/D2 and B1/A2 vs. D1/C2. The semifinal winners qualified for the Olympics. No championship game was held.
- The semifinal losers played for the last Olympic qualifying berth.

== Preliminary round ==
Qualified for the quarterfinals

All times are local (UTC−04:30)

=== Group A ===
Team	W	L	PF	PA	Diff	Pts.
Greece	2	0	205	147	+58	4
Puerto Rico	1	1	177	150	+27	3
Jordan	0	2	115	200	−85	2

2 July
13:30

Report

Greece	107–63	Jordan
Scoring by quarter: 33–12, 23–11, 29–20, 22–20
Pts: Papanikolaou 19; Rebs: Bourousis, Printezis 7 Asts: Spanoulis 7		Pts: Soobzokov 14; Rebs: Abbas 7 Asts: Soobzokov 4

Poliedro de Caracas, Caracas
Referees: Vicente Bultó (ESP), Alejandro César Chiti (ARG), Qiao Longsheng (CHN)

3 July
17:00

Report

Jordan	52–93	Puerto Rico
Scoring by quarter: 11–29, 11–25, 10–18, 20–21
Pts: Daghles 17; Rebs: Daghles 7 Asts: Daghles 3		Pts: Ramos 20; Rebs: Ramos 9 Asts: Rodríguez 6

Poliedro de Caracas, Caracas
Referees: Juan Carlos García González (ESP), Juan José Fernández (ARG), Nachid Messaoudi (ALG)

4 July
19:30

Report

Puerto Rico	84–98	Greece
Scoring by quarter: 27–30, 20–19, 15–21, 22–28
Pts: Ramos 15; Rebs: Ramos 7 Asts: Barea 4		Pts: Spanoulis 27; Rebs: four players 4 Asts: Spanoulis, Calathes 5

Poliedro de Caracas, Caracas
Referees: Bradley Jon Giersch (AUS), Matej Boltauzer (SLO), Michael John Weiland (CAN)

=== Group B ===
Team	W	L	PF	PA	Diff	Pts.
Lithuania	1	1	180	168	+12	3
Nigeria	1	1	155	151	+4	3
Venezuela	1	1	153	169	–16	3

2 July
19:30

Report

Nigeria	69–71	Venezuela
Scoring by quarter: 18–17, 9–12, 23–22, 19–20
Pts: Diogu 14; Rebs: Diogu 10; Asts: Skinn, Dagunduro 4		Pts: Vásquez 24; Rebs: Echenique 9 Asts: Cubillan 6

Poliedro de Caracas, Caracas
Referees: Juan Carlos García González (ESP), Matej Boltauzer (SLO), Rüştü Nuran (TUR)

3 July
19:30

Report

Venezuela	82–100	Lithuania
Scoring by quarter: 21–23, 15–26, 28–31, 18–20
Pts: Vásquez 24; Rebs: Graterol 8 Asts: Vásquez 7		Pts: Kleiza 28; Rebs: Mačiulis 8 Asts: Kalnietis 8

Poliedro de Caracas, Caracas
Referees: Bradley Jon Giersch (AUS), Milivoje Jovčić (SRB), Michael John Weiland (CAN)

4 July
17:00

Report

Lithuania	80–86	Nigeria
Scoring by quarter: 20–20, 18–21, 19–26, 23–19
Pts: Kleiza 22; Rebs: Mačiulis, Valančiūnas 5 Asts: Kalnietis 8		Pts: Obasohan 20; Rebs: Aminu 9 Asts: Skinn, Oyedeji 3

Poliedro de Caracas, Caracas
Referees: Vicente Bultó (ESP), Yuji Hirahara (JPN), Nachid Messaoudi (ALG)

=== Group C ===
Team	W	L	PF	PA	Diff	Pts.
Russia	2	0	175	125	+50	4
Dominican Republic	1	1	164	169	−5	3
South Korea	0	2	141	186	−45	2

2 July
11:00

Report

Russia	91–56	South Korea
Scoring by quarter: 27–16, 18–10, 22–16, 24–14
Pts: Kirilenko 16; Rebs: Khryapa 9 Asts: Shved 4		Pts: Lee S-J. 15; Rebs: Kim J-K., Kim T-S. 5 Asts: Kim S-H., Kim T-S. 4

Poliedro de Caracas, Caracas
Referees: Bradley Jon Giersch (AUS), Milivoje Jovčić (SRB), Nachid Messaoudi (ALG)

3 July
11:00

Report

South Korea	85–95	Dominican Republic
Scoring by quarter: 19–17, 22–20, 24–34, 20–24
Pts: Lee S-J. 21; Rebs: three players 6 Asts: Kim T-S. 6		Pts: Horford 30; Rebs: Martínez 25; Asts: Horford, Ramon 4

Poliedro de Caracas, Caracas
Referees: Matej Boltauzer (SLO), Alejandro César Chiti (ARG), Qiao Longsheng (CHN)

4 July
13:30

Report

Dominican Republic	69–84	Russia
Scoring by quarter: 18–23, 20–21, 15–21, 16–19
Pts: Horford 22; Rebs: Martínez 12; Asts: Coronado 5		Pts: Fridzon, Kirilenko 16; Rebs: Kirilenko 13; Asts: Kirilenko 7

Poliedro de Caracas, Caracas
Referees: Rüştü Nuran (TUR), Juan José Fernández (ARG), Roberto Oliveros (VEN)

=== Group D ===
Team	W	L	PF	PA	Diff	Pts.
Macedonia	1	1	168	150	+18	3
Angola	1	1	152	152	0	3
New Zealand	1	1	130	148	−18	3

2 July
16:30

Report

Angola	88–84	Macedonia
Scoring by quarter: 32–21, 21–19, 19–19, 16–25
Pts: Mingas 24; Rebs: Gomes 11; Asts: Mingas 6		Pts: McCalebb 21; Rebs: Samardžiski 7 Asts: Ilievski, McCalebb 5

Poliedro de Caracas, Caracas
Referees: Michael John Weiland (CAN), Juan José Fernández (ARG), Yuji Hirahara (JPN)

3 July
13:30

Report

Macedonia	84–62	New Zealand
Scoring by quarter: 26–11, 18–20, 16–17, 24–14
Pts: McCalebb 23; Rebs: Antić 10; Asts: McCalebb 11		Pts: Pledger 11; Rebs: Pledger 11; Asts: Kenny 6

Poliedro de Caracas, Caracas
Referees: Vicente Bultó (ESP), Roberto Oliveros (VEN), Rüştü Nuran (TUR)

4 July
11:00

Report

New Zealand	68–64	Angola
Scoring by quarter: 14–12, 26–14, 18–26, 10–12
Pts: Webster 21; Rebs: Pledger 9 Asts: Tait 5		Pts: Mingas 17; Rebs: Mingas 10; Asts: four players 3

Poliedro de Caracas, Caracas
Referees: Juan Carlos García González (ESP), Milivoje Jovčić (SRB), Qiao Longsheng (CHN)

== Knockout stage ==
Quarterfinals	Semifinals
A1	Greece	79
B2	Nigeria	80
B2	Nigeria	77
C1	Russia	85
C1	Russia	80
D2	Angola	65
B1	Lithuania	76
A2	Puerto Rico	72
B1	Lithuania	109	Third place
C2	Dominican Republic	83
D1	Macedonia	76
B2	Nigeria	88
C2	Dominican Republic	86
C2	Dominican Republic	73

=== Quarterfinals ===
6 July
11:00

Report

Russia	80–65	Angola
Scoring by quarter: 25–21, 18–5, 17–16, 20–23
Pts: Fridzon 18; Rebs: Monia 6 Asts: Kirilenko, Shved 5		Pts: Mingas 20; Rebs: Paulo 9 Asts: Barros 4

Poliedro de Caracas, Caracas
Referees: Matej Boltauzer (SLO), Bradley Jon Giersch (AUS), Nachid Messaoudi (ALG)

6 July
13:30

Report

Greece	79–80	Nigeria
Scoring by quarter: 21–21, 21–9, 14–20, 23–30
Pts: Spanoulis 25; Rebs: Spanoulis 7 Asts: Spanoulis 5		Pts: Diogu 17; Rebs: Diogu 12; Asts: Aminu 2

Poliedro de Caracas, Caracas
Referees: Vicente Bultó (ESP), Juan José Fernández (ARG), Roberto Oliveros (VEN)

6 July
17:00

Report

Macedonia	76–86	Dominican Republic
Scoring by quarter: 23–10, 18–18, 15–26, 20–32
Pts: McCalebb 35; Rebs: Samardžiski 13; Asts: Ilievski, V. Stojanovski 3		Pts: García 28; Rebs: Horford 15; Asts: Coronado 5

Poliedro de Caracas, Caracas
Referees: Michael John Weiland (CAN), Rüştü Nuran (TUR), Yuji Hirahara (JPN)

6 July
19:30

Report

Lithuania	76–72	Puerto Rico
Scoring by quarter: 16–22, 24–16, 17–17, 19–17
Pts: Kalnietis, Kleiza 14; Rebs: Mačiulis 11; Asts: Jasikevičius, Kalnietis 3		Pts: Galindo 17; Rebs: Peavy 12; Asts: Arroyo 8

Poliedro de Caracas, Caracas
Referees: Juan Carlos García González (ESP), Alejandro César Chiti (ARG), Milivoje Jovčić (SRB)

=== Semifinals ===
7 July
17:00

Report

Nigeria	77–85	Russia
Scoring by quarter: 23–26, 8–20, 22–22, 24–17
Pts: Diogu, Dagunduro 16; Rebs: Diogu 14; Asts: Dagunduro 5		Pts: Shved 22; Rebs: Kirilenko 8 Asts: Shved 6

Poliedro de Caracas, Caracas
Referees: Michael John Weiland (CAN), Milivoje Jovčić (SRB), Yuji Hirahara (JPN)

7 July
19:30

Report

Lithuania	109–83	Dominican Republic
Scoring by quarter: 21–16, 31–20, 23–25, 34–22
Pts: Mačiulis 19; Rebs: Valančiūnas 7 Asts: Kalnietis 9		Pts: Martínez 13; Rebs: Martínez 10; Asts: Coronado 4

Poliedro de Caracas, Caracas
Referees: Vicente Bultó (ESP), Juan José Fernández (ARG), Bradley Jon Giersch (AUS)

=== Third place match ===
8 July
19:30

Report

Nigeria	88–73	Dominican Republic
Scoring by quarter: 24–18, 23–21, 12–18, 29–16
Pts: Diogu 25; Rebs: Diogu 10; Asts: Skinn, Dagunduro 5		Pts: García 17; Rebs: Ramon, Martínez 9 Asts: Coronado 3

Poliedro de Caracas, Caracas
Referees: Juan Carlos García González (ESP), Matej Boltauzer (SLO), Rüştü Nuran (TUR)

== Final standings ==
#	Team	W–L	Qualification
1st place, gold medalist(s)	Russia	4-0	Qualify to the Olympics
1st place, gold medalist(s)	Lithuania	3-1	Qualify to the Olympics
3rd place, bronze medalist(s)	Nigeria	3-2	Qualify to the Olympics
4	Dominican Republic	2-3	
5	Greece	2-1	
6	Puerto Rico	1-2	
7	Macedonia	1-2	
8	Angola	1-2	
9	Venezuela	1-1	
10	New Zealand	1-1	
11	South Korea	0-2	
12	Jordan	0-2	

== See also ==
- Basketball at the 2012 Summer Olympics
- 2012 FIBA World Olympic Qualifying Tournament for Women
