= Fraser High School =

Fraser High School could refer to:

- Hamilton's Fraser High School in New Zealand
- Fraser High School in Fraser, Michigan, United States
