= Jeremiah Trueman =

New Zealand basketball player

Personal information
- Born: 19 May 1987 (age 37); New Plymouth, Taranaki, New Zealand
- Listed height: 205 cm (6 ft 9 in)

Career information
- High school: Nelson College (Nelson, New Zealand)
- College: San Diego Christian (2005–2007); Alaska Anchorage (2007–2009)
- NBA draft: 2009: undrafted
- Playing career: 2004–2015
- Position: Center / power forward

Career history
- 2004–2005: Nelson Giants
- 2009–2010: New Zealand Breakers
- 2010: Taranaki Mountainairs
- 2010–2013: Perth Wildcats
- 2011–2015: Manawatu Jets
- 2013: New Zealand Breakers
- 2014: Perth Wildcats
- 2014–2015: San Diego Surf

Career highlights and awards
- NZNBL rebounding champion (2015)

Jeremiah Kloeten Trueman (born 19 May 1987) is a New Zealand former professional basketball player.

== Early life ==
Trueman was born in New Plymouth and originally grew up in nearby Stratford. He joined his parents, first in Tasmania and then in Brazil, as Christian missionaries. The family arrived in South America when Trueman was seven and took over a hostel that housed a group of street kids, staying in the country for four years. In Brazil, he attended school, learnt Portuguese, and played soccer. Upon returning to New Zealand, he started playing basketball.

In 2004 and 2005, Trueman attended Nelson College in Nelson and played for the school's basketball team. During those two years, he also played in the New Zealand NBL for the Nelson Giants.

Trueman captained the Junior Tall Blacks that played in the Australian Youth Olympic Festival in Sydney in January 2005, scoring 14 points in the tournament's final.

== College career ==
Between 2005 and 2007, Trueman was a two-year starter at San Diego Christian College in the NAIA, where he averaged 6.8 points on 64 percent shooting with 5.0 rebounds per game and helped the Hawks to back-to-back NAIA National Tournament appearances. Between 2007 and 2009, he played for Alaska Anchorage in the NCAA Division II. The 2007–08 season saw Trueman help the Seawolves post the best record in school history (29–6), with the team winning the Great Northwest Athletic Conference and advancing to NCAA Semifinals. He led the squad with .618 FG% and was the fifth-leading scorer (5.5 ppg) and rebounder (2.8 rpg). As a senior in 2008–09, Trueman paced the Seawolves in field-goal percentage (.597), free-throw percentage (.870), blocks per game (1.0), and offensive rebounding (2.3 orpg), earning All-Great Northwest Athletic Conference honorable mention accolades. He ranked second on the team in scoring (15.8 ppg) and third in rebounding (5.5 rpg).

== Professional career ==
After graduating from college, Trueman returned to New Zealand and joined the New Zealand Breakers for the 2009–10 NBL season. He then played for the Taranaki Mountainairs during the 2010 New Zealand NBL season.

For the 2010–11 NBL season, Trueman joined the Perth Wildcats. After playing for the Manawatu Jets during the 2011 New Zealand NBL season, he returned to the Wildcats for the 2011–12 NBL season. Another stint with the Jets followed in 2012, with Trueman then playing another season with the Wildcats in 2012–13. He re-joined the Jets in 2013 for a third season.

For the 2013–14 NBL season, Trueman returned to the New Zealand Breakers, but his season was cut short when he was released in late October. In January 2014, he re-joined the Wildcats as a short-term injury replacement for Matthew Knight.

Trueman re-joined the Manawatu Jets for the 2014 New Zealand NBL season, and then moved to the United States for the 2014–15 season, where he played for the San Diego Surf of the American Basketball Association. He returned to Manawatu for one final season in 2015, where he was crowned the rebounding champion.

== National team career ==
Trueman made his debut for the Tall Blacks in 2006. His next selection to the team came in 2009.

== Personal ==
Trueman is the son of Cathy and Marty, and he has two brothers, Matthew and Izaak.

Trueman and his American wife, Mary, have three children.
