= Chris Hagan =

American basketball player (born 1989)

Personal information
- Born: February 19, 1989 (age 37) Houston, Texas
- Listed height: 181 cm (5 ft 11 in)

Career information
- High school: Westfield (Houston, Texas)
- College: Rice (2006–2008); Blinn College (2008–2009); Midwestern State (2009–2011)
- NBA draft: 2011: undrafted
- Playing career: 2011–2015
- Position: Point guard

Career history
- 2011: Manawatu Jets
- 2011–2012: Halifax Rainmen
- 2012: Manawatu Jets
- 2012–2013: Montreal Jazz
- 2013: Manawatu Jets
- 2013–2015: Shreveport-Bossier Mavericks
- 2015: Taranaki Mountainairs

Career highlights
- ABA champion (2014); LSC South Division Player of the Year (2011); First-team All-LSC South Division (2011); Second-team All-LSC South Division (2010); Third-team NJCAA All-Region XIV (2009)

Christopher Joseph Hagan (born February 19, 1989) is an American former professional basketball player. He best known for his time spent in the New Zealand National Basketball League between 2011 and 2015.

== High school career ==
Hagan attended Westfield High School in Houston, Texas, where he was a three-year letterwinner for coach Larry Brown. As a senior in 2005–06, he averaged 14 points, six assists and three steals per game as he helped the Mustangs finish with a 36–1 record and a No. 2 national ranking. He earned all-state and district defensive player of the year honors as a junior and senior.

== College career ==
In his freshman season at Rice, Hagan played in all 32 games and made 17 starts, including the first two games of his collegiate career. He finished second on the team with 77 assists (2.4 apg) while also averaging 5.1 points, 1.3 rebounds and 1.3 steals per game.

In his sophomore season, Hagan played in the Owls' first three games before suffering a ruptured patella tendon against Richmond on November 20, 2007. He subsequently underwent surgery the same week and did not return to the court for the remainder of the season. He recorded totals of six points, four rebounds, seven assists and four steals.

On June 5, 2008, Hagan transferred to Blinn College to continue his education as well as play basketball. As a redshirted sophomore in 2008–09, he earned third-team NJCAA All-Region XIV honors after averaging 12.9 points, 5.1 assists, 1.7 rebounds and 3.5 steals in 29 games. He connected on 58.6 percent from field including 43.3 percent from the three-point line, and scored a season-high 30 points against Lee College while recording at least 20 points on six other occasions.

In August 2009, Hagan transferred to Midwestern State University. In his junior season, he earned second-team All-Lone Star Conference South Division honors after averaging 11.9 points to go along with four assists and two rebounds per game as the Mustangs claimed their second-straight division championship—their third in four years. He also earned NCAA Division II South Central Region All-Tournament team honors after averaging 14.3 points per game in wins over Incarnate Word, Tarleton State and Central Missouri.

In his senior season, Hagan earned Lone Star Conference South Division Player of the Year honors as well as being named first-team All-LSC South Division. He played and started in 33 games, missing just one game, and averaged a league-leading 21.4 points per game. He subsequently became the eighth two-year player in MSU history to amass 1,000 points and stands fourth on the all-time two-year scorers list with 1,188 points trailing only Tony Forch (1,391) and Henry Crawford (1,320).

== Professional career ==
On June 2, 2011, Hagan signed with the Manawatu Jets for the rest of the 2011 New Zealand NBL season.

On December 3, 2011, Hagan signed with the Halifax Rainmen for the rest of the 2011–12 NBL Canada season.

In May 2012, Hagan returned to the Manawatu Jets, signing with the team for the rest of the 2012 New Zealand NBL season as a replacement for injured forward Dustin Mitchell.

On December 4, 2012, Hagan signed with the Montreal Jazz for the rest of the 2012–13 NBL Canada season. On February 25, 2013, he was placed on the team's injury list.

In April 2013, Hagan re-signed with the Manawatu Jets for the 2013 New Zealand NBL season. In his first full season with the Jets, he averaged a league-leading 2.9 steals per game in addition to 19.1 points, 2.9 rebounds and 7.1 assists in 16 games.

In October 2013, Hagan joined the Shreveport-Bossier Mavericks for the 2013–14 ABA season. He went on to average 17.1 points and 4.8 assists per game as he helped the Mavericks claim the 2014 ABA championship. In October 2014, he re-joined the team for the 2014–15 season.

On November 26, 2014, Hagan signed with the Taranaki Mountainairs for the 2015 New Zealand NBL season. In 13 games for Taranaki, he averaged 19.3 points, 2.8 rebounds, 6.6 assists and a league-leading 2.7 steals per game.

== Post-basketball career ==
After retiring from basketball, Hagan started a career as a Hip Hop "Street Gospel" Artist. In September 2016, he released his first album.

== Personal ==
Hagan is the son of Kenneth and Ingrid Hagan, and has one sister named LaKeesha who played collegiate volleyball at Central Florida.
