= Ron Dorsey (basketball, born 1983) =

American basketball player

Personal information
- Born: November 2, 1983 (age 43) Detroit, Michigan, U.S.
- Listed height: 6 ft 6 in (1.98 m)
- Listed weight: 205 lb (93 kg)

Career information
- High school: Pershing (Detroit, Michigan)
- College: Schoolcraft JC (2001–2003); McNeese State (2003–2005)
- NBA draft: 2005: undrafted
- Playing career: 2005–2017
- Position: Small forward / shooting guard

Career history
- 2005–2006: Kauhajoen Karhu
- 2006–2007: Neptūnas Klaipėda
- 2007–2009: SPO Rouen Basket
- 2009–2010: Étendard de Brest
- 2010–2011: Cairns Taipans
- 2011–2012: Melbourne Tigers
- 2012: Auckland Pirates
- 2012–2013: Rosa Radom
- 2017: Águilas Doradas de Durango

Career highlights
- NZNBL champion (2012); LNB Pro B champion (2008); Baltic League All-Star (2007); Lithuanian League All-Star (2007)

Ronald Houdini Dorsey (born November 2, 1983) is an American former professional basketball player. The 6'6" swingman played two seasons of college basketball for McNeese State before venturing to Europe, where he played in Finland, Lithuania and France. He is most notable for his time spent in Australia and New Zealand, where he helped lead the Cairns Taipans to the 2011 Australian NBL Grand Final and the Auckland Pirates to the 2012 New Zealand NBL Championship.

== College career ==
Dorsey, a Detroit, Michigan native, played two seasons of junior college for Schoolcraft College before signing with the McNeese State men's basketball program in April 2003. Over two seasons for the Cowboys, Dorsey averaged 6.5 points and 3.3 rebounds in 53 games.

== Professional career ==
Between 2005 and 2007, Dorsey had two successful seasons playing in Finland and Lithuania, averaging 23 points per game for Kauhajoen Karhu in 2005–06, and 15 points per game for Neptūnas in 2006–07. He helped Neptūnas finish third in the regular season, as they made it the farthest in the playoffs in club history.

In 2007, Dorsey moved to France, where he signed with SPO Rouen Basket of the LNB Pro B. He averaged 16.6 points and 4.6 rebounds per game in 2007–08 and helped Rouen finish first on the season, subsequently promoting them to the Pro A for the 2008–09 season. He remained with the team in 2008–09 and averaged 12.5 points per game.

In 2009, Dorsey returned to the Pro B, signing with Étendard de Brest. He managed just half a season with Étendard due to a shoulder injury suffered in January 2010. In 15 games, he averaged 12.6 points and 3.1 rebounds per game.

After recovering from the injury, Dorsey received an opportunity to attend a San Antonio Spurs mini camp in September 2010. The following month, he signed with the Cairns Taipans for the 2010–11 NBL season. Dorsey marked a special place in the club's history after draining a miraculous long three-pointer to send Game 2 of the 2011 NBL Grand Final series against the New Zealand Breakers into double overtime. Despite winning that game, they lost the series 2–1, but that didn't stop Dorsey's heroics going down in club folklore. In 33 games for the Taipans in 2010–11, he averaged 13.1 points, 4.9 rebounds, 1.2 assists and 1.4 steals per game.

On May 25, 2011, Dorsey signed a two-year deal with the Melbourne Tigers. After averaging 11 points per game in 2011–12, he was released from the second year of his contract.

In March 2012, Dorsey signed with the Auckland Pirates for the 2012 New Zealand NBL season. He helped the Pirates win the championship in 2012, scoring 18 points in the team's 89–83 grand final win over the Wellington Saints. In 13 games for the Pirates, he averaged 16.7 points, 4.5 rebounds, 1.9 assists and 1.4 steals per game.

On December 21, 2012, Dorsey signed with Rosa Radom of the Polish Basketball League. He spent the rest of the 2012–13 season with the Polish club, where he averaged 5.9 points and 2.2 rebounds in 16 games.

In March 2017, after being out of the game for four years, Dorsey joined Mexican team Águilas Doradas de Durango of the Circuito de Baloncesto de la Costa del Pacífico. In four games for Durango, he averaged 7.0 points and 3.3 rebounds per game.

== Personal ==
During his time away from playing professionally between 2013 and 2017, Dorsey began running a basketball coaching business in Louisiana.
