= Ray Cameron =

Personal information
- Born: 7 March 1982 (age 44)
- Listed height: 190 cm (6 ft 3 in)
- Listed weight: 130 kg (287 lb)

Career information
- High school: Whangārei Boys' High School (Whangārei, New Zealand); Church College of New Zealand (Hamilton, New Zealand)
- Playing career: 2001–2011
- Position: Shooting guard / small forward

Career history
- 2001–2011: Waikato Titans/Pistons

Career highlights
- 4× NBL champion (2001, 2002, 2008, 2009)

Raymond Cameron (born 7 March 1982) is a New Zealand former basketball player who played in the National Basketball League (NBL).

Cameron's family has a strong connection to the Northland Region in the far north of New Zealand, with his brother Pero and his mother Mata being notable Whangārei basketball identities. Cameron was raised in Portland, and attended Whangārei Boys' High School and Hamilton's Church College of New Zealand.

Cameron was a member of the Waikato Titans' back-to-back NBL championship squad in 2001 and 2002. He re-joined the Waikato team, now known as the Pistons, in 2007. In 2008 and 2009, he was a member of the Pistons' back-to-back title run, thus earning four championships for his career. Cameron continued on with the Pistons the following two seasons, where in July 2011, he played his 100th NBL game. Following the team's withdrawal from the league in 2012, Cameron retired from the NBL.
