= Jake McKinlay =

NZ basketball player (2001–2021)

Personal information
- Born: 6 April 2001
- Died: 20 December 2021 (aged 20) Horowhenua, New Zealand
- Listed height: 6 ft 7 in (2.01 m)
- Listed weight: 220 lb (100 kg)

Career information
- High school: Palmerston North Boys' (Palmerston North, New Zealand)
- College: Mineral Area College (2019–2020)
- Playing career: 2018–2021
- Position: Small forward / power forward

Career history
- 2018–2019; 2021: Manawatu Jets

Career highlights
- No. 12 retired by Manawatu Jets
Medals
Men's basketball
Representing New Zealand
FIBA Asia Under-16 Championship
Bronze medal – third place	2018 China	Team

Jake Tyrone McKinlay (6 April 2001 – 20 December 2021) was a New Zealand basketball player. He played three seasons in the New Zealand National Basketball League (NZNBL) for the Manawatu Jets and one season of college basketball in the United States for Mineral Area College. He helped New Zealand win bronze at the FIBA Under-16 Asian Championship in 2018.

Following his death in 2021, the Manawatu Jets retired McKinlay's number 12 jersey.

== Early life and junior career ==
McKinlay's hometown was the Palmerston North suburb of Awapuni. He started playing basketball in his second year of intermediate after a teacher at Monrad Intermediate School convinced him to play. He attended Palmerston North Boys' High School, where he captained the school's premier basketball squad in 2018 while being named in the New Zealand secondary schools' tournament team.

McKinlay represented Basketball Manawatu at the U17 National Championship in 2017 and the U19 National Championship in 2018 and 2019, earning Tournament team honours all three years. He also played at the 2019 U23 National Championship, where he was named to the All-Star Five.

== Basketball career ==
=== NZNBL and college ===
McKinlay debuted in the New Zealand National Basketball League (NZNBL) in the 2018 season with the Manawatu Jets, joining just a handful of players to play in the league while still at high school. He was a regular member of the playing squad and started in a number of games. On 25 May 2018, he scored a season-high nine points in a 109–101 loss to the Wellington Saints. His nine points were tallied with three 3-pointers in the first quarter. He averaged 2.7 points and 1.0 rebounds in 12 games in his rookie year.

With the Jets in the 2019 New Zealand NBL season, McKinlay totalled eight points in eight games. Following the season, he competed in the NBA Academy Games in the United States.

In October 2019, McKinlay committed to play college basketball for Mineral Area College in the National Junior College Athletic Association (NJCAA). On 1 January 2020, he scored a season-high 14 points in a 111–70 win over Faith Prep. In 26 games in the 2019–20 season, he averaged 3.5 points and 1.6 rebounds per game.

McKinlay returned to New Zealand in 2020 but did not play due to the COVID-19 pandemic.

In February 2021, McKinlay signed with the Manawatu Jets for the 2021 New Zealand NBL season. He was brought in to play both forward positions and during the season he was touted as a "defensive lynchpin". On 23 May 2021, he had a career-best game with 15 points, seven rebounds and seven steals in an 85–77 win over the Taranaki Mountainairs. On 13 June, he was carried off the court with a serious knee injury late in the first quarter against the Wellington Saints. He was diagnosed with a dislocated knee and missed the rest of the season. In 11 games, he averaged 6.8 points, 6.6 rebounds, 1.0 assists and 1.6 steals per game.

By December 2021, McKinlay had recovered from the injury and had signed with the Wellington Saints for the 2022 season. He was also set to play in the NBL 3x3 Cup in February 2022.

=== National team ===
In April 2018, McKinlay represented New Zealand at the FIBA Under-16 Asian Championship in China. The Junior Tall Blacks won the bronze medal with a 76–60 win over Philippines in the third place game, becoming the first Junior Tall Blacks team to qualify for the FIBA Under-17 World Cup. McKinlay averaged 8.5 points and 4.0 rebounds in six games. At the 2018 FIBA Under-17 Basketball World Cup in Argentina a few months later, he averaged 4.4 points, 3.3 rebounds and 1.1 assists in seven games.

== Personal life ==
McKinlay's immediate family consisted of his mother, Gayna, who was a solo parent.

Away from basketball, McKinlay had done some work as a teacher aide and during the 2021 off-season he had been working at Acrow Scaffolding in Palmerston North.

== Death ==
McKinlay died on 20 December 2021, shortly before 6:00 a.m., following a serious crash involving his car and a truck on State Highway 1 in the Horowhenua District north of Ōtaki. He had been playing basketball in Wellington the previous day and was coming back to Palmerston North for work.

In July 2022, the Manawatu Jets retired McKinlay's No. 12 jersey.
