= Fraser High School, Hamilton =

Fraser High School
- Te Kura Tuarua o Taniwharau

Location
- 72 Ellicott Road; Hamilton; New Zealand; 37.7840°S 175.2431°E

Information
- Type: State Co-educational Secondary School (Year 9–13)
- Established: 1920
- Ministry of Education Institution no.: 135
- Principal: Virginia Crawford
- Enrolment: 1,446 (July 2026)
- Socio-economic decile: 4J
- Website: www.fraser.school.nz

Fraser High School (FHS) is a secondary school in Hamilton, New Zealand. The school began in 1920 as Hamilton Technical Day School (later amended to Hamilton's Technical High School in 1924).

== History ==
In 1970, the school moved to the northwest suburbs of Hamilton and was re-established as a comprehensive co-educational secondary school. In 1969 while still at the Hamilton Technical College site the school was called Fraser High School under principal Dave Campbell. The school took its name from the original Principal, Whampoa Fraser. In 1998 the name was modified slightly to Hamilton's Fraser High School to reflect their historical link to Hamilton Technical Day School, and to give a stronger geographical link to Hamilton. The Māori name of the school is Te Kura Tuarua o Taniwharau.

The former principal of the school, Martin Elliott, caused some controversy over his use of obscenities during his ill-fated run for the Mayoralty of Hamilton in 2004.

In 2001, the school suffered a huge loss when the school gymnasium was burnt down by vandals. A newer and larger gym was built in its place through support from the community. The school also opened a new technology block, on 19 October 2007, which has very similar architecture to the gymnasium.

The school was one of a number of Hamilton schools affected by the 2003 gypsy moth operations in the city. In 2004, the school's compensation claim for the cost of relief teachers to cover staff absences during the operations was declined by The Ministry of Agriculture and Forestry.

Acting head Virginia Crawford was appointed the new principal following the resignation of Martin Elliott. after the discovery of his embezzlement in 2009. She had been a deputy principal at the school for 5 years. The school roll as of 30 March 2010, is 1657. Virginia Crawford became the principal in 2010, after a Board of Trustees election.

In 2013, the technology block was updated with 2 new kitchens and a sewing room.

In 2018, in a statement against students skipping school, Principal Virginia Crawford stated that students who skipped school would become "A statistic of the worst kind, highly likely to go to prison, either commit domestic violence or be a victim of domestic violence, be illiterate, be a rape victim, be a suicide victim." This speech went on to mention students skipping school dying at an early age, experiencing major health issues and going to prison. This speech caused an outrage among students who were in the assembly and resulted in over 100 students skipping school out of protest.

== Enrolment ==
As of July 2026, Fraser High School has a roll of 1,446 students, of which 618 (42.7%) identify as Māori.

As of 2026, the school has an Equity Index of 508, placing it amongst schools whose students have many socioeconomic barriers to achievement (roughly equivalent to deciles 2 and 3 under the former socio-economic decile system).

== Cadets ==
Hamilton's Fraser High School is the home to the country's last school-based cadet unit, which celebrated its 80th Jubilee in 2011. The Hamilton's Fraser High School Cadet Unit provides on a rotating basis, the duty of providing honour guards to the cenotaph on ANZAC Day, sharing this with the Hamilton City Cadet Corps, Hamilton Air Training Corps, TS Rangiri Sea Cadet Corps.

== Facilities ==
The school has a guidance and careers department and medical facilities. Guidance counselling and medical treatment is provided to all students when required.

Construction is slowly progressing on Ministry of Education funded new multimillion-dollar technical block which will accommodate such subjects as soft and hard fabrics, catering and automotive. The school also has a Teen Parent Unit and Frasers' Little Feet Childcare Centre.

== Hamilton Technical College ==
Fraser High School was formed in 1968 when Hamilton Technical College was split into Fraser High School and Waikato Technical Institute. Both institutions initially operated on the site of what is now Wintec's Hamilton City Campus, before Fraser High School relocated to Ellicott Road in 1970.

== Notable alumni ==
- Sir William ("Bill") Birch – former National Member of Parliament for Franklin and Minister of Finance from 1993 to 1999
- Duane Bailey – basketballer for New Zealand Breakers and Southland Sharks
- Sarah McLaughlin – soccer player for Football Ferns and national youth representative sides
- Greg Smith – Super Rugby Player Waikato Chiefs, currently head coach for the National Women Rugby Team of New Zealand
- Alex Pledger – basketballer for New Zealand Breakers
- Marco Rojas – footballer for the New Zealand national football team
