= 2013 New Zealand NBL season =

- League: New Zealand NBL
- Sport: Basketball
- Duration: 19 April – 14 July
- Games: 16
- Teams: 9

Regular season
- Minor premiers: Wellington Saints
- Season MVP: Lindsay Tait (Wellington Saints)
- Top scorer: Josh Pace (Nelson Giants)

Final Four
- Champions: Southland Sharks
- Runners-up: Nelson Giants
- Final Four MVP: Leon Henry

New Zealand NBL seasons
- ← 2012 2014 →

The 2013 NBL season was the 32nd season of the National Basketball League. The 2013 season saw the withdrawal of the Auckland Pirates and Harbour Heat, but saw the return of the Waikato Pistons after a one-year hiatus as well as the Super City Rangers, who returned to the league for the first time since 1995.

The 2013 NBL Final Four saw the top four teams play off on Saturday 13 July in a semifinals round, with the winner of each game playing in the final on Sunday 14 July at Pettigrew Green Arena in Napier.

== Team information ==
| Team | City | Arena | Head coach | Import | Import |
|---|---|---|---|---|---|
| Hawke's Bay Hawks | Napier | Pettigrew Green Arena | (New Zealand) Tab Baldwin | (Serbia) Darko Cohadarevic | (United States) Brian Greene |
| Manawatu Jets | Palmerston North | Arena Manawatu | (Greece) Mike Kalavros | (United States) Chris Hagan | (United States) Marcel Jones* |
| Nelson Giants | Nelson | Trafalgar Centre | (Australia) Liam Flynn | (United States) Erron Maxey | (United States) Josh Pace |
| Otago Nuggets | Dunedin | Edgar Centre | (New Zealand) Anthony Arlidge | (United States) Antoine Tisby | (United States) Akeem Wright |
| Southland Sharks | Invercargill | Stadium Southland | (New Zealand) Paul Henare | (United States) Kevin Braswell | (United States) Brian Conklin |
| Super City Rangers | Auckland | The Trusts Arena | (New Zealand) Aik Ho | (United States) Carl Buck | |
| Taranaki Mountainairs | New Plymouth | TSB Stadium | (New Zealand) Dave Bublitz | (United States) Kenny Gabriel | (United States) Jack Leasure |
| Waikato Pistons | Hamilton | Hamilton Boys' High School | (New Zealand) Doug Courtney | (United States) Zack Atkinson | (United States) Garrius Holloman |
| Wellington Saints | Wellington | TSB Bank Arena | (New Zealand) Pero Cameron | (United States) Bryant Markson | (United States) Rick Rickert |

*Despite holding New Zealand citizenship, Jones had to play as an import due to a new league rule where each team could only field one naturalised New Zealand player (Manawatu already had Nick Horvath filling that spot).

== Summary ==
=== Regular season standings ===
Pos
| Pos | Team | W | L |
|---|---|---|---|
| 1 | Wellington Saints | 14 | 2 |
| 2 | Otago Nuggets | 12 | 4 |
| 3 | Nelson Giants | 12 | 4 |
| 4 | Southland Sharks | 11 | 5 |
| 5 | Manawatu Jets | 9 | 7 |
| 6 | Taranaki Mountainairs | 5 | 11 |
| 7 | Hawke's Bay Hawks | 5 | 11 |
| 8 | Waikato Pistons | 2 | 14 |
| 9 | Super City Rangers | 2 | 14 |

=== Final Four ===
Semi-finals
1 | Wellington Saints | 66
4 | Southland Sharks | 81
2 | Otago Nuggets | 72
3 | Nelson Giants | 87

Final
Southland Sharks | 92
Nelson Giants | 81

== Awards ==
=== Player of the Week ===
| Round | Player | Team | Ref |
|---|---|---|---|
| 1 | B. J. Anthony | Otago Nuggets | |
| 2 | Josh Pace | Nelson Giants | |
| 3 | Kenny Gabriel | Taranaki Mountainairs | |
| 4 | Nick Horvath | Manawatu Jets | |
| 5 | Akeem Wright | Otago Nuggets | |
| 6 | Bryant Markson | Wellington Saints | |
| 7 | Antoine Tisby | Otago Nuggets | |
| 8 | Kevin Braswell | Southland Sharks | |
| 9 | Akeem Wright | Otago Nuggets | |
| 10 | Josh Pace | Nelson Giants | |
| 11 | Rick Rickert | Wellington Saints | |
| 12 | Mark Dickel | Otago Nuggets | |

=== Statistics leaders ===
Stats as of the end of the regular season

| Category | Player | Team | Stat |
|---|---|---|---|
| Points per game | Josh Pace | Nelson Giants | 22.9 |
| Rebounds per game | Zack Atkinson | Waikato Pistons | 14.6 |
| Assists per game | Lindsay Tait | Wellington Saints | 8.1 |
| Steals per game | Chris Hagan | Manawatu Jets | 2.9 |
| Blocks per game | Zack Atkinson | Waikato Pistons | 3.0 |

=== Regular season ===
- Most Valuable Player: Lindsay Tait (Wellington Saints)
- NZ Most Valuable Player: Lindsay Tait (Wellington Saints)
- Most Outstanding Guard: Lindsay Tait (Wellington Saints)
- Most Outstanding NZ Guard: Lindsay Tait (Wellington Saints)
- Most Outstanding Forward: Brian Conklin (Southland Sharks)
- Most Outstanding NZ Forward/Centre: B. J. Anthony (Otago Nuggets)
- Scoring Champion: Josh Pace (Nelson Giants)
- Rebounding Champion: Zack Atkinson (Waikato Pistons)
- Assist Champion: Lindsay Tait (Wellington Saints)
- Rookie of the Year: Tai Webster (Waikato Pistons)
- Coach of the Year: Paul Henare (Southland Sharks)
- All-Star Five:
  - G: Lindsay Tait (Wellington Saints)
  - G: Josh Pace (Nelson Giants)
  - F: B. J. Anthony (Otago Nuggets)
  - F: Brian Conklin (Southland Sharks)
  - C: Nick Horvath (Manawatu Jets)

=== Final Four ===
- Final Four MVP: Leon Henry (Southland Sharks)
