= Ade Dagunduro =

Nigerian-American basketball player (born 1986)

Personal information
- Born: May 22, 1986 (age 40) Los Angeles, California
- Listed height: 6 ft 5 in (1.96 m)
- Listed weight: 200 lb (91 kg)

Career information
- High school: Inglewood (Inglewood, California)
- College: Mt. San Antonio College (2004–2005); Antelope Valley (2006–2007); Nebraska (2007–2009)
- NBA draft: 2009: undrafted
- Playing career: 2009–2012
- Position: Point guard / shooting guard

Career history
- 2009–2010: Mitteldeutscher BC
- 2010–2012: Leuven Bears
- 2012: Virtus Roma

Career highlights
- Third team All-Big 12 (2009)

Adeola Adedokun "Ade" Dagunduro (born May 22, 1986) is a retired Nigerian-American professional men's basketball player.

== College career ==
After playing high school basketball at Inglewood High, Dagunduro then played college basketball at Mt. San Antonio College (2004–05), Antelope Valley CC (2005–07), and the University of Nebraska, where he played with the Nebraska Cornhuskers (2007–09).

== Professional career ==
During his playing career, Dagunduro played with Mitteldeutscher BC of the German League, Leuven Bears of the Belgian League, and Virtus Roma of the Italian League.

== Nigerian national team ==
Dagunduro represented Nigeria at the 2012 Summer Olympics.
