= Stretch four =

Basketball position

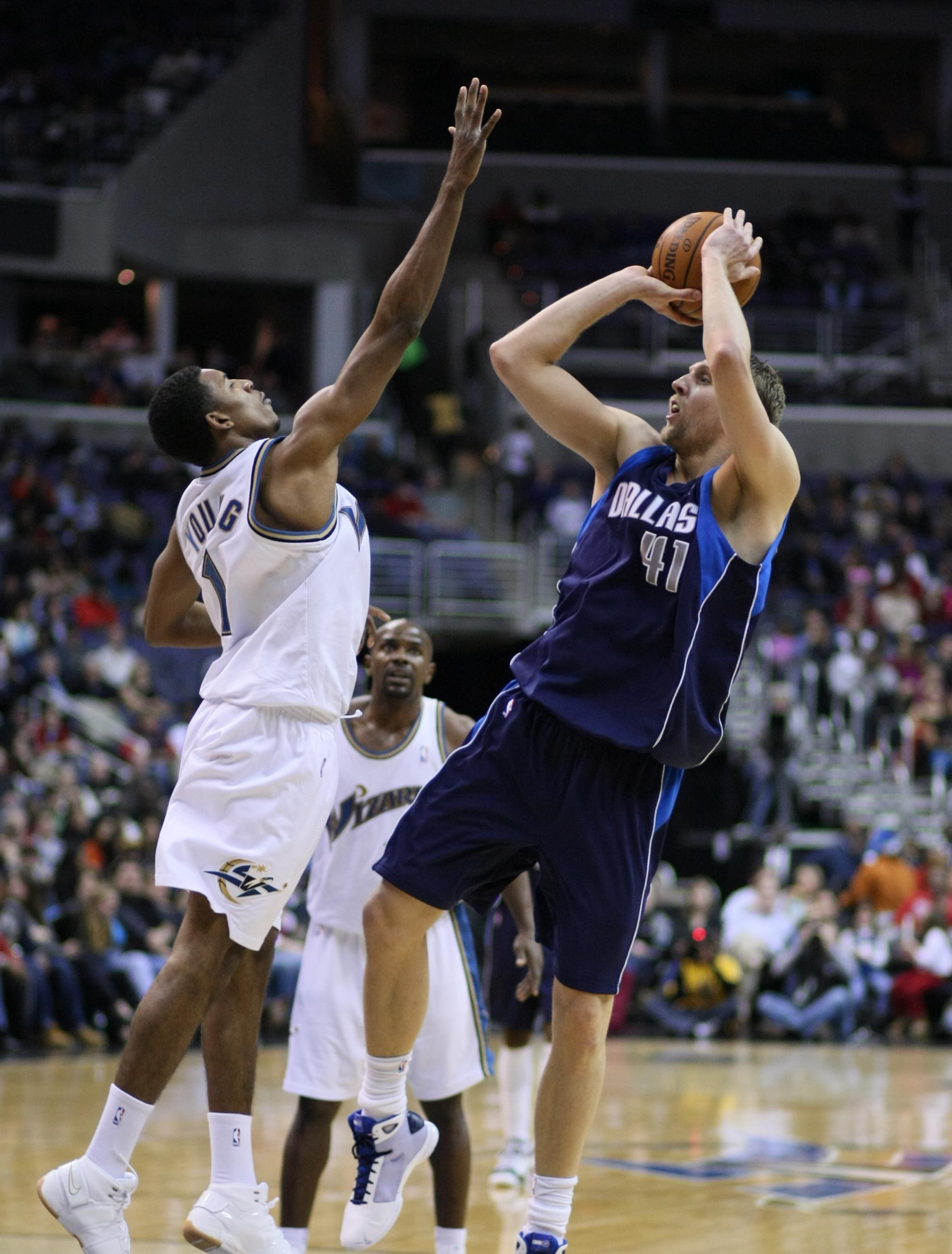
Dirk Nowitzki, pictured in 2008, was well-known for his outside shooting ability as a seven-footer.

In basketball, a stretch four (sometimes called a stretch big) is a player at the power forward position that can shoot further from the basket than a conventional power forward. "Stretch" describes the effect that such a player has on the opposition's defense, and the power forward position is also known as the "four"; hence "stretch four". The stretch four is a fairly recent innovation in the NBA (with an "explosion" of players coming through since the 1999–2000 season), but has become more common as many NBA coaches use the "small-ball" line-up/tactical play.

== Style of play ==
Power forwards (PF's) traditionally play close to the basket, using their size and strength to provide interior defense, posting up (scoring close to the basket) and rebounding. A stretch four is a player that is of power forward size, but has superior shooting skills (especially three-point field goals), spending more of their time away from the basket. While using these skills on offense, the player retains the ability to defend the opposing power forward.

Stretch fours are tactically employed in this way to "stretch" the opponent's defense. The ability to score a high percentage of catch-and-shoot three-point shots from distance (the distinct feature of a stretch four) causes defensive problems for the other team, as it pulls the opposing power forward defender out of the low post area, opening up driving lanes for teammates to exploit (these can be running lanes or passing lanes). Unlike some traditional, plodding power forwards, stretch fours must also be able to defend counterparts who can shoot from outside. They may also have to defend smaller perimeter players.

Players who have the same playstyle as stretch fours, but play the center position are called stretch fives.

== See also ==
- Tweener
