= 2011 New Zealand NBL season =

- League: New Zealand NBL
- Sport: Basketball
- Duration: 13 April – 17 July
- Games: 16
- Teams: 9

Regular season
- Minor premiers: Wellington Saints
- Season MVP: Alex Pledger (Waikato Pistons)
- Top scorer: Jack Leasure (Taranaki Mountainairs)

Playoffs
- Champions: Wellington Saints
- Runners-up: Hawke's Bay Hawks
- Finals MVP: Lindsay Tait

New Zealand NBL seasons
- ← 2010 2012 →

The 2011 NBL season was the 30th season of the National Basketball League. In 2011, the Auckland Pirates debuted in the league but the Christchurch Cougars did not take part due to the effects of the 2011 Canterbury earthquake. The Harbour Heat also did not compete in the 2011 season, leaving the total number of teams at nine.

The regular season commenced on Wednesday 13 April with the Auckland Pirates hosting the Otago Nuggets at ASB Stadium in Auckland. Six teams qualified for the NBL Playoffs, with the third and fourth seeds hosting quarterfinal games against the sixth and fifth seeds, respectively, on Tuesday 12 July. The winners then joined the first and second seeds at the final four weekend. Wellington's waterfront TSB Bank Arena hosted the 2011 NBL Final Four, with two semifinals on Friday 15 July and the championship game on Sunday 17 July.

== Team information ==
Team	City	Arena	Head coach	Import	Import
Auckland Pirates	Auckland	ASB Stadium	(New Zealand) Kenny Stone	(United States) Kevin Mickens	
Hawke's Bay Hawks	Napier	Pettigrew Green Arena	(New Zealand) Paul Henare	(United States) Josh Pace	(United States) Galen Young
Manawatu Jets	Palmerston North	Arena Manawatu	(United States) Ryan Weisenberg	(United States) Chris Hagan	(United States) Darryl Hudson
Nelson Giants	Nelson	Trafalgar Centre	(New Zealand) Chris Tupu	(United States) Darryl Dora	(United States) Rod Grizzard
Otago Nuggets	Dunedin	Edgar Centre	(New Zealand) Anthony Arlidge	(United States) Lance Allred	(United States) Scott O'Gallagher
Southland Sharks	Invercargill	Stadium Southland	(New Zealand) Richard Dickel	(United States) Kaniel Dickens	(United States) Mike Rose
Taranaki Mountainairs	New Plymouth	TSB Stadium	(New Zealand) Angelo Hill	(United States) Marcus Campbell	(United States) Jack Leasure
Waikato Pistons	Hamilton	Hamilton Boys' High School	(Australia) Dean Vickerman	(United States) Jason Crowe	(United States) Jerry Smith
Wellington Saints	Wellington	TSB Bank Arena	(New Zealand) Pero Cameron	(United States) Kareem Johnson	(United States) Erron Maxey

== Summary ==
=== Regular season standings ===
Pos
Pos	Team	W	L
1	Wellington Saints	13	3
2	Waikato Pistons	13	3
3	Hawke's Bay Hawks	12	4
4	Nelson Giants	9	7
5	Manawatu Jets	7	9
6	Southland Sharks	6	10
7	Auckland Pirates	5	11
8	Taranaki Mountainairs	5	11
9	Otago Nuggets	2	14

=== Playoff bracket ===
Quarter-finals
4	Nelson Giants	89
5	Manawatu Jets	76
3	Hawke's Bay Hawks	89
6	Southland Sharks	75

Semi-finals
1	Wellington Saints	103
4	Nelson Giants	82
2	Waikato Pistons	86
3	Hawke's Bay Hawks	95

Final
Wellington Saints	106
Hawke's Bay Hawks	97

== Awards ==
=== Player of the Week ===
Round	Player	Team	Ref
1	Kevin Mickens	Auckland Pirates	
2	Nick Horvath	Manawatu Jets	
3	Kareem Johnson	Wellington Saints	
4	Erron Maxey	Wellington Saints	
5	Darryl Hudson	Manawatu Jets	
6	Lance Allred	Otago Nuggets	
7	Alex Pledger	Waikato Pistons	
8	Galen Young	Hawke's Bay Hawks	
9	Rod Grizzard	Nelson Giants	
10	Lindsay Tait	Wellington Saints	
11	Chris Hagan	Manawatu Jets	
12	Lindsay Tait	Wellington Saints	
13	Rod Grizzard	Nelson Giants	

=== Statistics leaders ===
Stats as of the end of the regular season

Category	Player	Team	Stat
Points per game	Jack Leasure	Taranaki Mountainairs	22.9
Rebounds per game	Nick Horvath	Manawatu Jets	11.7
Assists per game	Jason Crowe	Waikato Pistons	7.2
Steals per game	Jason Crowe	Waikato Pistons	3.3
Blocks per game	Alex Pledger	Waikato Pistons	2.4

=== Regular season ===
- Most Valuable Player: Alex Pledger (Waikato Pistons)
- NZ Most Valuable Player: Alex Pledger (Waikato Pistons)
- Most Outstanding Guard: Lindsay Tait (Wellington Saints)
- Most Outstanding NZ Guard: Lindsay Tait (Wellington Saints)
- Most Outstanding Forward: Alex Pledger (Waikato Pistons)
- Most Outstanding NZ Forward/Centre: Alex Pledger (Waikato Pistons)
- Scoring Champion: Jack Leasure (Taranaki Mountainairs)
- Rebounding Champion: Nick Horvath (Manawatu Jets)
- Assist Champion: Jason Crowe (Waikato Pistons)
- Rookie of the Year: Steven Adams (Wellington Saints)
- Coach of the Year: Dean Vickerman (Waikato Pistons)
- All-Star Five:
  - G: Lindsay Tait (Wellington Saints)
  - G: Jason Crowe (Waikato Pistons)
  - F: Thomas Abercrombie (Waikato Pistons)
  - F: Mika Vukona (Nelson Giants)
  - C: Alex Pledger (Waikato Pistons)

=== Playoffs ===
- Finals MVP: Lindsay Tait (Wellington Saints)
