= James Hunter (basketball) =

Australian-New Zealand basketball player

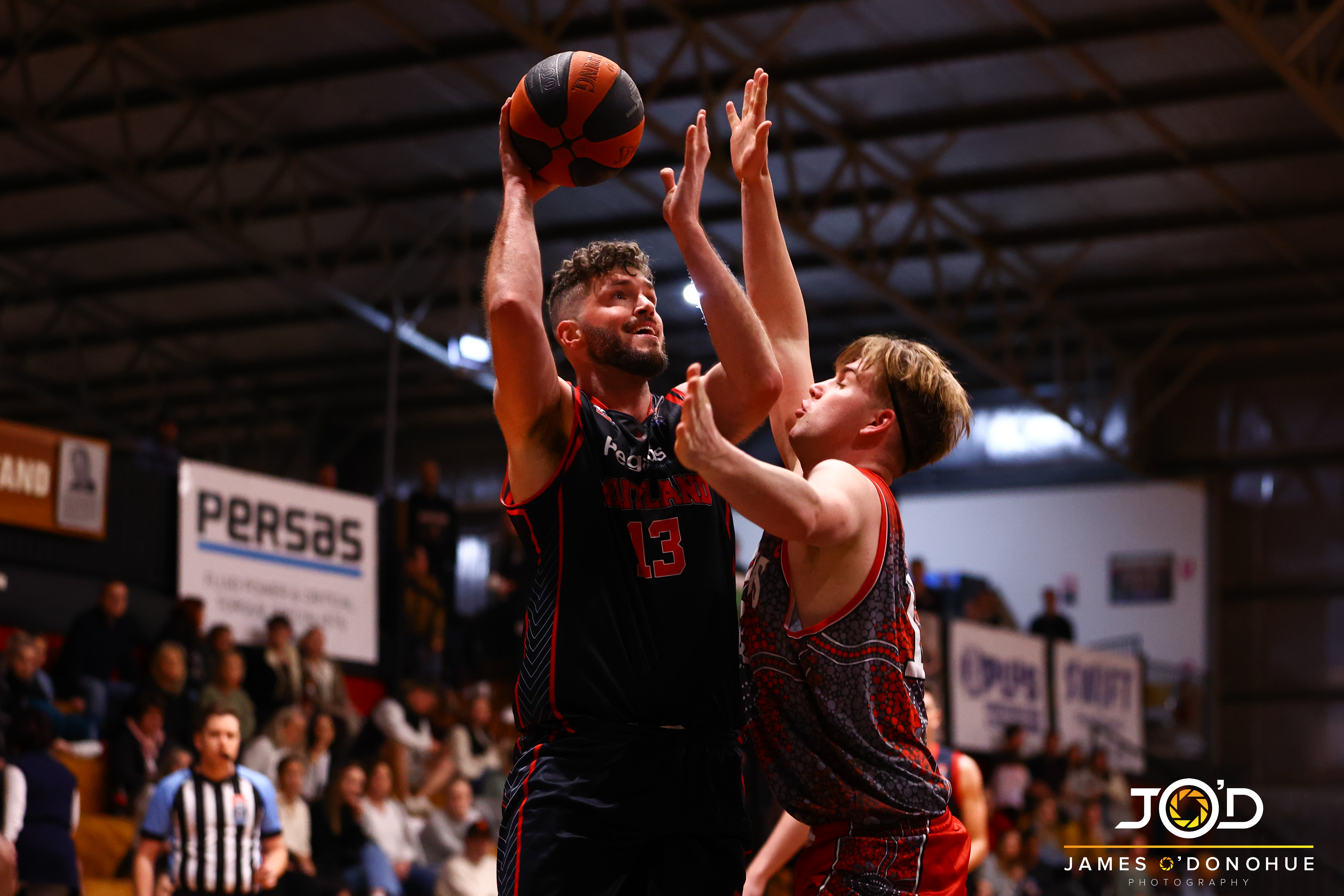
- Hunter with the Maitland Mustangs in 2022

Sutherland Sharks
- Position: Centre
- League: NBL1 East

Personal information
- Born: 19 June 1991 (age 35) Nowra, New South Wales
- Listed height: 208 cm (6 ft 10 in)
- Listed weight: 113 kg (249 lb)

Career information
- High school: Cranbrook School (Sydney, New South Wales)
- College: Gillette CC (2011–2012); Washington State (2012–2014); South Dakota (2014–2015)
- NBA draft: 2015: undrafted
- Playing career: 2009–present

Career history
- 2009–2011: Sydney Comets
- 2015: Manawatu Jets
- 2015–2016: CB Zamora
- 2016: Ballarat Miners
- 2017–2018: Southland Sharks
- 2017–2018: New Zealand Breakers
- 2019: Knox Raiders
- 2020–2021: Sydney Comets
- 2022–2025: Maitland Mustangs
- 2026–present: Sutherland Sharks

Career highlights
- NBL1 East champion (2024); NZNBL champion (2018)

James Paton Hunter (born 19 June 1991) is an Australian-New Zealand basketball player for the Sutherland Sharks of the NBL1 East.

== Early life ==
Hunter was born in Nowra, New South Wales, but spent much of his childhood living with his grandmother in Taumarunui, New Zealand. He subsequently obtained a New Zealand passport as a teenager.

For high school, Hunter attended Cranbrook School in the eastern suburbs of Sydney, where he was selected to represent Australia as part of the Australian Schoolboys' basketball team which traveled to the United States to compete in tournaments throughout North Carolina over a two-week period. He was also selected for the NSW Schoolboys State team and competed in the School Sport Australia Basketball Championship. Hunter also played rugby during his time at Cranbrook.

Between 2009 and 2011, Hunter also played in the Waratah League for the Sydney Comets.

== College career ==
Hunter's first college stint in the United States was at Gillette College. After redshirting the 2010–11 season, he averaged 13.0 points and 6.8 rebounds in his lone season for Gillette in 2011–12. He transferred to Washington State in 2012 and played just 18 games in two seasons. For the 2014–15 season, he transferred to South Dakota and averaged 5.8 points and 3.5 rebounds in 32 games.

== Professional career ==
Following the conclusion of his college career, Hunter joined the Manawatu Jets of the New Zealand National Basketball League (NZNBL) for the 2015 season. In eight games, he averaged 10.5 points and 6.5 rebounds per game.

For the 2015–16 season, Hunter played in Spain for Grupo INEC Zamora of the Liga EBA.

Hunter returned to Australia in 2016 and joined the Ballarat Miners of the South East Australian Basketball League (SEABL). He was awarded SEABL Player of the Week for Round 19. In 15 games for the Miners, he averaged 11.5 points and 6.3 rebounds per game.

Hunter joined the Southland Sharks for the 2017 New Zealand NBL season. In 18 games, he averaged 7.8 points and 5.2 rebounds per game.

On 11 July 2017, Hunter signed with the New Zealand Breakers of the Australian National Basketball League (NBL) for the 2017–18 season. On 8 January 2018, he was released by the Breakers. He appeared in two games for the Breakers, totalling five points. He later returned to the Southland Sharks for the 2018 New Zealand NBL season.

Hunter joined the Knox Raiders of the NBL1 for the 2019 season.

Between 2020 and 2021, Hunter played for the Sydney Comets in the Waratah League.

In March 2022, Hunter signed with the Maitland Mustangs of the NBL1 East for the 2022 NBL1 season. He was named team MVP. In December 2022, he re-signed with the Mustangs for the 2023 season. In the 2024 NBL1 season, he helped the Mustangs win the NBL1 East championship. He played a fourth season with the Mustangs in 2025.

In January 2026, Hunter signed with the Sutherland Sharks for the 2026 NBL1 East season. He was active but did not play in the Sharks' 2026 NBL1 East Grand Final appearance.

== National team career ==
Hunter played for New Zealand in the 2017 FIBA Asia Cup.

== Personal ==
Hunter is the son of musicians Todd Hunter and Johanna Pigott. He also has an older brother, Harry, and a younger brother, Joey. His grandmother is Fijian.
