= 2012 New Zealand NBL season =

- League: New Zealand NBL
- Sport: Basketball
- Duration: 1 March – 27 May
- Games: 16
- Teams: 9

Regular season
- Minor premiers: Hawke's Bay Hawks
- Season MVP: Nick Horvath (Manawatu Jets)
- Top scorer: Josh Pace (Manawatu Jets)

Final Four
- Champions: Auckland Pirates
- Runners-up: Wellington Saints
- Finals MVP: Alex Pledger

New Zealand NBL seasons
- ← 2011 2013 →

The 2012 NBL season was the 31st season of the National Basketball League. While the Harbour Heat returned for the 2012 season, the Waikato Pistons dropped out of the league. It marked the first time the league had no Waikato presence since 1983.

The Hawke's Bay Hawks were regular season winners in 2012. The final Four weekend was held in Wellington, with the semifinals on Saturday 26 May, followed by the championship game on Sunday 27 May. In the final, the Auckland Pirates were victorious over the two-time defending champion Wellington Saints.

== Team information ==
Team	City	Arena	Head coach	Import	Import
Auckland Pirates	Kohimarama, Auckland	ASB Stadium	(New Zealand) Judd Flavell	(United States) Ron Dorsey	(United States) Isma'il Muhammad
Harbour Heat	Wairau Valley, Auckland	North Shore Events Centre	(New Zealand) Alex Stojkovic	(United States) Zack Atkinson	(United States) Justin Bailey
Hawke's Bay Hawks	Napier	Pettigrew Green Arena	(New Zealand) Paul Henare	(United States) Kareem Johnson	(United States) Galen Young
Manawatu Jets	Palmerston North	Arena Manawatu	(United States) Ryan Weisenberg	(United States) Chris Hagan	(United States) Josh Pace
Nelson Giants	Nelson	Trafalgar Centre	(New Zealand) Chris Tupu	(United States) Pete Campbell	(United States) Michael Harrison
Otago Nuggets	Dunedin	Edgar Centre	(New Zealand) Anthony Arlidge	(United States) Antoine Tisby	(United States) Akeem Wright
Southland Sharks	Invercargill	Stadium Southland	(New Zealand) Richard Dickel	(United States) Larry Abney	(United States) Kevin Braswell
Taranaki Mountainairs	New Plymouth	TSB Stadium	(New Zealand) Dave Bublitz	(United States) Darryl Hudson	(United States) Jack Leasure
Wellington Saints	Wellington	TSB Bank Arena	(New Zealand) Pero Cameron	(United States) Jason Crowe	(United States) Ernest Scott

== Summary ==
=== Regular season standings ===
Pos
Pos	Team	W	L
1	Hawke's Bay Hawks	13	3
2	Auckland Pirates	13	3
3	Manawatu Jets	10	6
4	Wellington Saints	9	7
5	Taranaki Mountainairs	7	9
6	Nelson Giants	6	10
7	Otago Nuggets	6	10
8	Southland Sharks	5	11
9	Harbour Heat	3	13

=== Final Four ===
Semi-finals
1	Hawke's Bay Hawks	88
4	Wellington Saints	94
2	Auckland Pirates	104
3	Manawatu Jets	88

Final
Wellington Saints	83
Auckland Pirates	89

== Awards ==
=== Player of the Week ===
Round	Player	Team	Ref
1	Akeem Wright	Otago Nuggets	
2	Jason Crowe	Wellington Saints	
3	Nick Horvath	Manawatu Jets	
4	Lindsay Tait	Auckland Pirates	
5	Anthony Gurley	Wellington Saints	
6	Antoine Tisby	Otago Nuggets	
7	Jack Leasure	Taranaki Mountainairs	
8	Lindsay Tait	Auckland Pirates	
9	Darryl Hudson	Taranaki Mountainairs	
10	Justin Bailey	Harbour Heat	
11	Jason Crowe	Wellington Saints	
12	Larry Abney	Southland Sharks	

=== Statistics leaders ===
Stats as of the end of the regular season

Category	Player	Team	Stat
Points per game	Josh Pace	Manawatu Jets	23.0
Rebounds per game	Nick Horvath	Manawatu Jets	15.8
Assists per game	Jason Crowe	Wellington Saints	8.7
Steals per game	Kevin Braswell	Southland Sharks	3.0
Blocks per game	Michael Harrison	Nelson Giants	2.1

=== Regular season ===
- Most Valuable Player: Nick Horvath (Manawatu Jets)
- NZ Most Valuable Player: Nick Horvath (Manawatu Jets)
- Most Outstanding Guard: Lindsay Tait (Auckland Pirates)
- Most Outstanding NZ Guard: Lindsay Tait (Auckland Pirates)
- Most Outstanding Forward: Nick Horvath (Manawatu Jets)
- Most Outstanding NZ Forward/Centre: Nick Horvath (Manawatu Jets)
- Scoring Champion: Josh Pace (Manawatu Jets)
- Rebounding Champion: Nick Horvath (Manawatu Jets)
- Assist Champion: Jason Crowe (Wellington Saints)
- Rookie of the Year: Reuben Te Rangi (Harbour Heat)
- Coach of the Year: Paul Henare (Hawke's Bay Hawks)
- All-Star Five:
  - G: Lindsay Tait (Auckland Pirates)
  - G: Paora Winitana (Hawke's Bay Hawks)
  - F: Josh Pace (Manawatu Jets)
  - F: Antoine Tisby (Otago Nuggets)
  - C: Nick Horvath (Manawatu Jets)

=== Final Four ===
- Finals MVP: Alex Pledger (Auckland Pirates)
