= Ryan Weisenberg =

American basketball coach (born 1975)

Ryan Weisenberg (born January 21, 1975) is an American basketball coach who was the head coach of the Pepperdine Waves women's basketball team from 2012 to 2017.

== Biography ==
Weisenberg attended St. Francis High School in La Cañada Flintridge, California, where he lettered in basketball, football, and baseball. Weisenberg attended Azusa Pacific University, receiving a master's in education, and attended Cal Poly San Luis Obispo, receiving a Bachelor of Science.

Weisenberg began his coaching career in 1995 at Mission Prep High School in San Luis Obispo. Two years later, he spent some time as an assistant coach, video scout, and basketball camp director at Cal Poly, San Luis Obispo. He spent five years as head coach for South Pasadena High School's boy's varsity basketball.

After five years at South Pasadena, Weisenberg was hired as an assistant coach for the Los Angeles Sparks under coach Michael Cooper. After Cooper resigned in 2004, Weisenberg and Karleen Thompson were co-head coaches before leaving the Sparks. Then, Weisenberg worked for the Los Angeles Lakers as an assistant video coordinator and player scout.

Weisenberg taught world history at Mater Dei High School in Santa Ana and was the varsity girls head basketball coach. Ryan also taught part-time 6th grade history at St. Mark's Lutheran School in Hacienda Heights. Additionally, he is the former assistant coach for the Houston Comets.

On January 6, 2010, Weisenberg was confirmed as the new coach of the New Zealand National Basketball League's Manawatu Jets. The team is based in Palmerston North, New Zealand. Weisenberg coached the Jets for three seasons before departing the team in 2012.

Weisenberg was hired at Pepperdine University in 2012 and coached the women's basketball team until 2017.

== Legal issues ==
Weisenberg and Pepperdine University were sued in 2014 by two plaintiffs from the women's basketball team who claimed they were discriminated against for allegedly being in a romantic relationship. Their suit, one of the first to involve sexual orientation in a Title IX complaint, was dismissed in 2017.

== Personal life ==
Weisenberg is married to the former Lyndsey Hache.

== Head coaching record ==
Team	Year	G	W	L	W–L%	Finish	PG	PW	PL	PW–L%	Result
Los Angeles	2004	14	11	3	.786	1st in Western	3	1	2	.333	Lost in Conference semifinals
Career		14	11	3	.786		3	1	2	.333	
