= Auckland Pirates =

- League: National Basketball League
- Founded: March 2011
- Folded: November 2012
- History: Auckland Pirates; 2011–2012
- Arena: ASB Stadium
- Location: Auckland, New Zealand
- Team colours: Navy, orange, grey
- Championships: 1 (2012)
- Website: AucklandPirates.co.nz
Home	Away

The Auckland Pirates were a New Zealand basketball team based in Auckland. The Pirates competed in the National Basketball League (NBL) and played their home games at ASB Stadium.

== Team history ==
In March 2011, the franchise was unveiled by Basketball Auckland ahead of the 2011 NBL season, marking the return of an Auckland presence to the NBL, a year after the Auckland Stars folded. The inaugural squad included imports Raheim Brown and Kevin Mickens alongside Dillon Boucher, Luke Martin and Brook Ruscoe. The Pirates finished their first season in seventh place with a 5–11 record.

For the 2012 season, the Pirates retained Boucher and Ruscoe, and acquired Lindsay Tait, Alex Pledger, Hayden Allen, Duane Bailey and Ron Dorsey. They subsequently helped the Pirates finish the regular season in second place with a 13–3 record. After defeating the Manawatu Jets in the semi-finals, they faced the Wellington Saints in the final, where they won 89–83 to claim the NBL championship. Pledger was named Finals MVP, while Tait was named Most Outstanding Guard, Most Outstanding Kiwi Guard and All-Star Five for the 2012 season.

On 2 November 2012, the Pirates withdrew from the NBL, with Basketball Auckland revealing their financial model was unsustainable.
