= Pero Cameron =

New Zealand basketball player

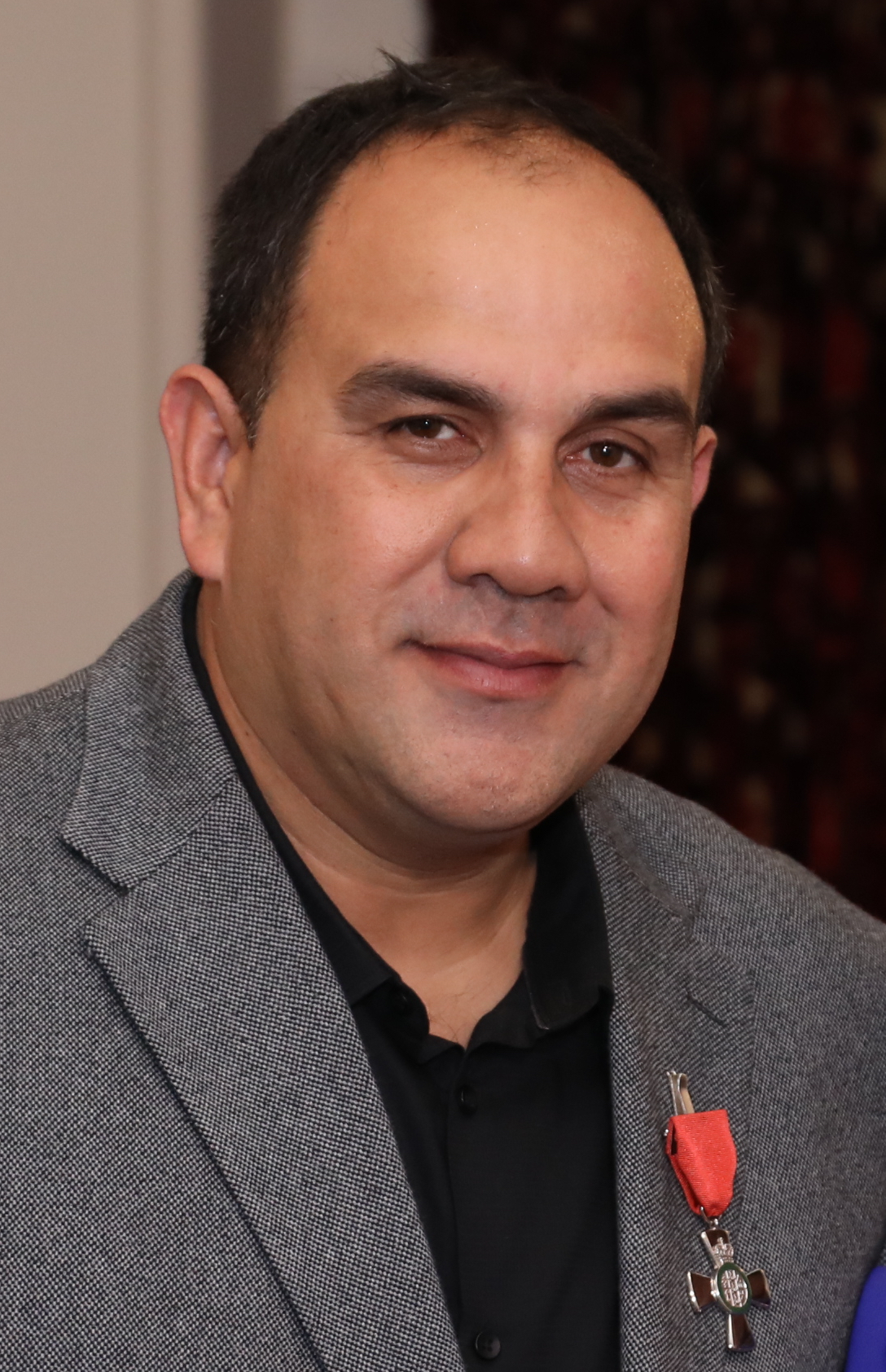
- Cameron in 2019

Gold Coast Rollers
- Title: Head coach
- League: NBL1 North

Personal information
- Born: 5 June 1974 (age 52) Tokoroa, New Zealand
- Listed height: 200 cm (6 ft 7 in)
- Listed weight: 130 kg (287 lb)

Career information
- High school: Whangarei Boys' (Whangārei, New Zealand)
- Playing career: 1992–2010
- Position: Power forward
- Coaching career: 2010–present

Career history

Playing
- 1992–1993: Waikato Warriors
- 1994–2000: Auckland Stars/Rebels
- 1995–1996: Ipoh Red Eagles
- 1999–2003: Chester Jets
- 2001–2009: Waikato Titans/Pistons
- 2003–2005: New Zealand Breakers
- 2005–2006: Banvit
- 2007: Mahram
- 2007–2010: Gold Coast Blaze

Coaching
- 2010–2013: Wellington Saints
- 2011–2012: Gold Coast Blaze (assistant)
- 2014: Waikato Pistons
- 2015: Wellington Saints
- 2016–2017: Gold Coast Rollers
- 2022: Taranaki Airs (assistant)
- 2022–2023: Brisbane Bullets (assistant)
- 2024–2025: Ningbo Rockets
- 2026–present: Gold Coast Rollers

Career highlights
- As player: 9× NZNBL champion (1995–1997, 1999–2002, 2008, 2009); NZNBL Rookie of the Year (1992); British Basketball League champion (2002); FIBA WC All-Tournament team (2002); As head coach: 2× NZNBL champion (2010, 2011); NZNBL Coach of the Year (2010)
- FIBA Hall of Fame
Medals
Men's basketball
Representing New Zealand
FIBA Oceania Championship
Silver medal – second place	2003 Australia
Silver medal – second place	2005 New Zealand
Silver medal – second place	2007 Australia
Commonwealth Games
Silver medal – second place	2006 Melbourne

Sean Pero MacPherson Cameron MNZM (born 5 June 1974) is a New Zealand basketball coach and former player. A FIBA Hall of Fame member, he captained the New Zealand Tall Blacks from 2000 to 2010, helping lead New Zealand to the semifinal of the 2002 FIBA World Championship, earning an All-Tournament Team selection in the process.

== Professional career ==
=== New Zealand NBL ===
In the late 1980s and early 1990s, Cameron played for Mobil Marters Northland in the Conference Basketball League (CBL) where he won a championship in 1991. In 1992, Cameron began playing in the New Zealand National Basketball League for the Waikato Warriors. He went on to win 11 championships (the most in New Zealand NBL history – nine as a player, two as a coach), made the league's all-star five seven times, and won the Kiwi MVP award five times. During his career, he played for 11 seasons for the Waikato franchise (played under all three names – Warriors, Titans and Pistons) and seven seasons for the Auckland Rebels.

NBL Championships (as player):	9 – Auckland (1995–1997, 1999, 2000), Waikato (2001, 2002, 2008, 2009)
NBL Championships (as coach):	2 – Wellington (2010, 2011)
NBL Rookie of the Year:	1992
NBL All-Star Five:	1994, 1995, 1996, 1997, 1998, 1999, 2001
Kiwi MVP:	1993, 1994, 1995, 1997, 1999
Outstanding Kiwi Forward:	1994, 1995, 1996, 1998, 1999
Outstanding Forward:	1998
Rebound Champion:	1993
Coach of the Year:	2010

=== Australian NBL ===
Cameron played five seasons in the Australian National Basketball League, two for the New Zealand Breakers and three for the Gold Coast Blaze. He played for both clubs in their respective inaugural seasons (Breakers in 2003–04 and Blaze in 2007–08). In a total of 130 ANBL games, he averaged 8.7 points, 4.2 rebounds and 2.0 assists per game.

=== Overseas ===
Cameron played six and a half seasons overseas; one for the Ipoh Red Eagles of Malaysia in 1995–96, four for the Chester Jets of England, one for Banvit of Turkey in 2005–06, and half a season playing for Mahram Tehran of Iran in 2007.

== National team career ==
Cameron was first selected for the Tall Blacks in 1994. In 2000, for the Sydney Olympics, he became co-captain of the side, and was elevated to sole captain the following year. His most memorable moment as captain of the Tall Blacks came in 2002 when the team stunned the basketball world by making the semi-finals of the 2002 FIBA World Championship, eventually losing to Germany for fourth place. In the tournament, Cameron averaged 14.7 points, 5.0 rebounds and 3.6 assists per game and became the only non-NBA player to make the All-Tournament Team. He was joined on this team by established NBA superstars Dirk Nowitzki and Peja Stojaković and NBA rookies-to-be Yao Ming and Manu Ginóbili.

Cameron retired from international duties having played in two Summer Olympic Games (Sydney 2000 and Athens 2004) and three FIBA World Cups (2002, 2006 and 2010).

In August 2017, Cameron became the first New Zealander to be inducted into the FIBA Hall of Fame as a player, with the official ceremony occurring on 30 September 2017 in Switzerland.

== Coaching career ==
Cameron began his coaching career with the Wellington Saints in 2010, going on to lead the club to a sixth NBL championship and winning the Coach of the Year award in his first year. He led the Saints to a second consecutive championship in 2011 and subsequently joined the Gold Coast Blaze's coaching staff as an assistant in 2011–12.

In June 2011, Cameron was named an assistant coach of the Tall Blacks.

After two more seasons as the Saints' head coach, Cameron joined his beloved Waikato Pistons as the team's head coach/player development manager for the 2014 season. However, in November 2014, the Pistons pulled out of the 2015 season due to financial reasons and he subsequently returned to the Saints head coaching position on a one-year deal on 14 January 2015.

On 9 December 2015, Cameron joined the Gold Coast Rollers as the men's team head coach for the 2016 Queensland Basketball League season. He continued on as coach of the Rollers in 2017.

In December 2019, after eight years of being an assistant, Cameron was appointed head coach of the Tall Blacks. In September 2021, he was reappointed Tall Blacks coach for three years.

In October 2021, Cameron signed a one-year deal to be director of basketball for the Taranaki Airs. He also served as the team's assistant coach in 2022.

In December 2022, Cameron was appointed assistant coach of the Brisbane Bullets for the rest of the 2022–23 NBL season. He parted ways with the Bullets following the season.

In August 2024, Cameron parted ways with the Tall Blacks after five years as head coach.

Cameron joined the Ningbo Rockets of the Chinese Basketball Association as head coach for the 2024–25 season.

Cameron joined the Gold Coast Rollers of the NBL1 North as women's head coach for the 2026 NBL1 season. At the 2026 NBL1 National Finals, Cameron served as an assistant for the Rollers men's team under Anthony Petrie. The team reached the championship game, where they defeated the Forestville Eagles 70–67 in overtime to win the NBL1 National championship.

== Personal life ==
Cameron's mother, Mata, from the Māori Ngāpuhi iwi, is an ex-New Zealand representative and a long-time coach of New Zealand age groups. His father is Scottish. His sister, Jody, is a former Tall Fern, and represented New Zealand at the Olympic Games in Athens 2004. His brother, Ray, is a former Waikato Titans/Pistons player. His other sisters, Jeannie and Zeta, also played basketball at a high level.

Cameron and his wife Jennelle have three children. His sons, Tobias and Flynn, were part of the NZ Junior Tall Blacks team that competed at the 2017 FIBA Under-19 Basketball World Cup. Flynn is a member of the Tall Blacks senior team for the 2023 FIBA World Cup, which is coached by his father.

== Honours ==
- FIBA World Cup's All-Tournament Team – 2002
- Maori Sportsman of the Year – 2002
- Sparc Leadership Award – 2003
- Commonwealth Games Silver – 2006
- Member of the New Zealand Order of Merit, for services to basketball – 2011 Queen's Birthday Honours.
- Inducted into FIBA Hall of Fame – 2017
