= Alex Pledger =

New Zealand basketball player (born 1987)

Personal information
- Born: 27 March 1987 (age 39) Blenheim, New Zealand
- Listed height: 215 cm (7 ft 1 in)
- Listed weight: 113 kg (249 lb)

Career information
- High school: Hamilton Boys' (Hamilton, New Zealand)
- College: Kansas City (2005–2008); Belmont Abbey (2008–2009)
- NBA draft: 2009: undrafted
- Playing career: 2009–2023
- Position: Centre

Career history
- 2009–2011: Waikato Pistons
- 2009–2018: New Zealand Breakers
- 2012: Auckland Pirates
- 2016–2019: Southland Sharks
- 2018–2020: Melbourne United
- 2021; 2023: Southland Sharks

Career highlights
- 4× NBL champion (2011–2013, 2015); 2× NZNBL champion (2012, 2018); NZNBL Finals MVP (2012); NZNBL MVP (2011); 2× NZNBL All-Star Five (2011, 2016); No. 35 retired by Southland Sharks
Medals
Representing New Zealand
Men's basketball
Commonwealth Games
Bronze medal – third place	2018 Gold Coast	Team competition

Alex John Pledger (born 27 March 1987) is a New Zealand former professional basketball player. He played college basketball in the United States for Kansas City and Belmont Abbey before playing eleven seasons in the Australian National Basketball League (NBL) between 2009 and 2020. In nine seasons with the New Zealand Breakers, he won four NBL championships. In the New Zealand National Basketball League (NZNBL), he won championships with the Auckland Pirates (2012) and Southland Sharks (2018). He was also a regular member of the New Zealand national team.

== College career ==
Between 2005 and 2008, Pledger was a member of the UMKC Kangaroos college basketball team in the United States. His best season came in 2006–07 when he averaged 5.2 points, 4.7 rebounds and 1.1 blocks in 29 games. After a foot injury limited him to one game in the 2007–08 season, Pledger transferred to Belmont Abbey College for the 2008–09 season, where he averaged 12.1 points and 5.9 rebounds in 12 games for the Crusaders in the NCAA Division II.

== Professional career ==
Pledger made his debut in the New Zealand NBL in 2009 for the Waikato Pistons. He averaged 3.3 points and 3.1 rebounds in eight games and helped the Pistons win the championship. He was subsequently signed by the New Zealand Breakers as a development player for the 2009–10 NBL season. He averaged 1.7 points and 1.4 rebounds in nine games during his first season with the Breakers. He returned to the Pistons for the 2010 season, where he averaged 11.7 points, 11.8 rebounds and 1.9 blocks in 21 games while helping the team return to the NBL Finals series.

Pledger was elevated to the Breakers' full-time playing squad for the 2010–11 season. The Breakers went on to win their maiden championship that season. In 34 games, he averaged 6.1 points and 4.6 rebounds per game. With the Pistons in 2011, he earned league MVP honours and averaged 16.8 points, 11.7 rebounds, 1.2 assists and 2.4 blocks in 12 games.

The 2011–12 NBL season saw Pledger and the Breakers win back-to-back championships. Also in 2012, Pledger helped the Auckland Pirates win the NZNBL championship behind a Finals MVP performance.

Pledger became the Breakers' starting centre in the 2012–13 season. During the season, he was twice named Player of the Week and recorded career-best numbers with averages of 10.7 points and 7.3 rebounds. The Breakers claimed an NBL championship three-peat that season.

Pledger missed the second half of the 2013–14 season with a left ankle injury. He returned to action in 2014–15 and helped the Breakers win a fourth championship in five years.

In 2015–16, the Breakers finished runners-up in the NBL after losing the grand final series to the Perth Wildcats. He appeared in 31 of the team's 33 games in 2015–16, averaging 6.5 points, 5.7 rebounds and 1.5 blocks per game.

In 2016, Pledger returned to the New Zealand NBL for the first time since 2012, joining the Southland Sharks. In 19 games for the Sharks, he averaged 16.5 points, 11.4 rebounds, 1.5 assists and 1.4 blocks per game.

On 9 April 2016, Pledger re-signed with the Breakers on a three-year deal.

Following the 2016–17 NBL season, Pledger returned to the Southland Sharks for the 2017 New Zealand NBL season. However, he spent a portion of the Sharks' season on the sidelines due to concussion-related problems. In 17 games, he averaged 13.2 points, 10.0 rebounds, 1.2 assists and 1.8 blocks per game. He played a third season with the Sharks in 2018.

On 18 May 2018, after mutually agreeing to part ways with the New Zealand Breakers, Pledger signed with Melbourne United for the 2018–19 season.

In April 2019, Pledger re-joined the Sharks for the 2019 season.

On 30 April 2019, Pledger re-signed with United for the 2019–20 season. On 18 November 2019, he was sidelined for six to eight weeks after undergoing surgery to repair a right ankle injury.

On 23 December 2020, Pledger signed with the Southland Sharks for the 2021 season, returning to the franchise for a fifth season. Due to a cancer diagnosis, he only managed to play in the Sharks' final home regular season game.

In May 2023, Pledger re-joined the Sharks for the rest of the 2023 season. He announced his retirement from basketball on 5 July 2023. The Sharks subsequently retired his #35 jersey.

== National team career ==
Pledger made his senior debut with the New Zealand national team at the 2008 FIBA World Olympic Qualifying Tournament. His next appearance for the Tall Blacks came during the 2009 FIBA Oceania Championship.

== Personal life ==
In March 2021, Pledger was diagnosed with Colorectal cancer. He received the diagnosis after nearly five months of feeling unwell with tests coming back inconclusive. He announced he was cancer free in September 2021, following an operation and further tests.

In 2021, Pledger married his long-time partner Bailee Wilson in Queenstown.
