= Manawatu Jets =

Basketball team in Palmerston North, New Zealand

- League: NZNBL
- Founded: 1982
- History: Palmerston North Jets; 1982; 1985–1987; 1989–2001; Manawatu Jets; 2002–2015; 2018–present
- Arena: Central Energy Trust Arena
- Location: Palmerston North, Manawatū, New Zealand
- Team colours: Green, white, black
- Main sponsor: Property Brokers
- Chairman: Craig Nash
- Head coach: Lindsay Tait
- Ownership: Tim Mordaunt
- Championships: 0
- Retired numbers: 1 (12)
- Website: thejets.co.nz
Home	Away

The Manawatu Jets are a New Zealand professional men's basketball team based in Palmerston North. The Jets compete in the National Basketball League (NBL) and play their home games at Central Energy Trust Arena. For sponsorship reasons, they are known as the Property Brokers Manawatu Jets.

== Team history ==
The Palmerston North Jets were a foundation member of the National Basketball League (NBL) in 1982. After finishing eighth in the eight-team competition, the Jets were relegated to the second-tiered Conference Basketball League (CBL) in 1983. After finishing as CBL runners-up in 1984, they were promoted back into the NBL in 1985. They finished fifth in both 1985 and 1986, but after finishing tenth in the ten-team competition in 1987, the Jets were relegated to the CBL in 1988. The 1988 season saw the Jets win the CBL championship, which saw them promoted back into the NBL in 1989. The Jets were regular season winners in 1989, but despite being the top seed at the finals weekend, they were defeated 92–84 in the semifinal by the Canterbury Rams. In 1992, the Jets reached the NBL final, where they were defeated 79–71 by the Rams. In 2002, the team became known as the Manawatu Jets.

In November 2015, the Jets withdrew from the NBL due to reduced funding and an unsustainable business model. In April 2017, the Jets lodged their application to Basketball New Zealand to compete in the 2018 NBL season. Their application was successful, and on 29 August 2017, the Jets were readmitted into the league.

In 2020, the Jets reached the NBL final for the second time in their history, where they lost 79–77 to the Otago Nuggets.

In 2022, the Jets retired the number 12 jersey of Jake McKinlay following his death the previous year.

== Players ==
=== Current roster ===
Note: Flags indicate national team eligibility at FIBA-sanctioned events. Players may hold other non-FIBA nationalities not displayed.

Manawatu Jets roster
Players
Coaches

Pos.	No.	Nat.	Name	Ht.
G	0	(New Zealand)	Webster, Tai	1.93 m (6 ft 4 in)
G	1	(New Zealand)	McDaniel, Christian	1.91 m (6 ft 3 in)
F	2	(New Zealand)	Richards, Lukah	2.01 m (6 ft 7 in)
G	3	(New Zealand)	Caldwell, Boston	2.01 m (6 ft 7 in)
F	4	(United States)	Small, Isiah (I)	2.02 m (6 ft 8 in)
F	5	(New Zealand)	Collins, Dion	2.03 m (6 ft 8 in)
G	7	(New Zealand)	Leota, Reuben
F	8	(New Zealand)	Makoii, Isaac	1.96 m (6 ft 5 in)
G	9	(New Zealand)	Webster, Corey	1.88 m (6 ft 2 in)
G	10	(United States)	Sand, Kaden (I & C)	1.98 m (6 ft 6 in)
G	11	(New Zealand)	Chout, Chout
G	15	(New Zealand)	Abbott, Ihaia	1.91 m (6 ft 3 in)
G	21	(New Zealand)	Essahaty, Ahmed	1.88 m (6 ft 2 in)
	22	(New Zealand)	Simms, Thomas
G	25	(New Zealand)	Evans, Kazlo	1.80 m (5 ft 11 in)
F	36	(New Zealand)	Reed, Jameer	1.96 m (6 ft 5 in)
C		(United Kingdom)	Mullens, Byron (injured) (IN)	2.13 m (7 ft 0 in)

Head coach

- (United States) Tony Webster

Assistant coach(es)

- (New Zealand) Elias Alqaheri
- (New Zealand) Manu Hoque

Legend

- (C) Team captain
- (DP) Development player
- (I) Import player
- Injured

- Roster
Updated: 23 July 2026

=== Notable past players ===
- (United States) / (New Zealand) Ed Book
- (United States) / (New Zealand) Willie Burton
- (Australia) David Cooper
- (United States) Chris Hagan
- (United States) / (New Zealand) Nick Horvath
- (Australia) / (New Zealand) James Hunter
- (United States) / (New Zealand) Marcel Jones
- (Australia) / (New Zealand) Luke Martin
- (United States) Josh Pace
- (New Zealand) Jeremiah Trueman
- (New Zealand) Mika Vukona

=== Retired numbers ===
Manawatu Jets retired numbers
No	Nat.	Player	Position	Tenure	Ceremony date
12	(New Zealand)	Jake McKinlay	SF/PF	2018–2021	23rd July 2022
