= Moulin de Rouvres =

Historically relevant mill in Meuse, France

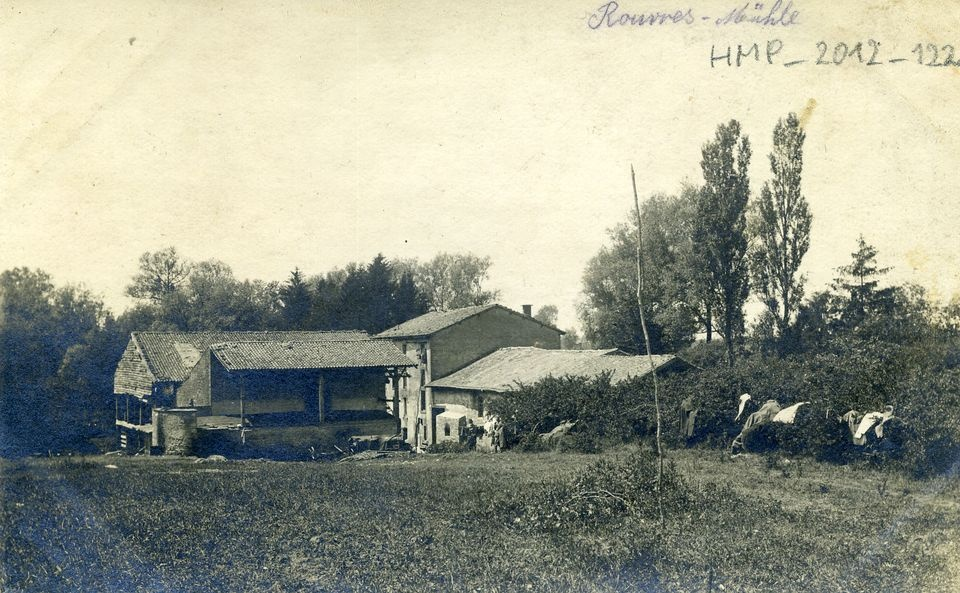
- East view of the mill in 1916.
- Interactive map of the Moulin de Rouvres area

General information
- Location: Rouvres-en-Woëvre commune, Meuse department, Lorraine region, France
- Coordinates: 49°12′03″N 05°41′49″E
- Completed: Before 1230
- Owner: Private owner

Design and construction
- Designations: Former watermill. Nowadays a museum and farm.

The Moulin de Rouvres is a historic site in the Rouvres-en-Woëvre commune, in the French department of Meuse. It was first mentioned in the 13th century. Originally part of a farm dating back to Gallo-Roman times, it was transformed into an abbey in the 11th century. A pond, which probably predates its construction, provided a dual function for milling and fish farming. Between the 13th and 18th centuries, it became an important watermill and a major source of income for the seigneury of Rouvres-en-Woëvre.

However, faced with competition from French coastal fish and industrial gristmills, it was finally dismantled and its pond drained at the end of the 19th century. Initially transformed into a farm, it was located at the heart of the Battle of the Frontiers during World War I, then occupied by the German army and transformed into a military camp. Its proximity to the front line during the Battle of Verdun made it a strategic location, providing shelter for up to 3,000 soldiers. After the war, it returned to agricultural use, but gradually fell into disrepair. Partially restored in the early 21st century, it now houses a museum dedicated to the First World War.

== Location ==
=== Geomorphological context ===
The Rouvres mill lies at the southern end of the Dalle d'Étain, an Upper Bathonian marl-limestone tabular outcrop found only in north-western Lorraine. This layer is located in a transition zone between the clayey depression of the Woëvre plain (to the west) and the limestone plateau of the Pays Haut des Côtes de Moselle (to the east). The oolitic limestones of the Étain slab are much more solid than the other limestone layers of the Meuse region, and are joined at the surface by rhynchonella marl. The quality of this rock favored the development of a major extraction activity that contributed to the economic dynamism of the areas around the mill during the Middle Ages. Near Rouvres-en-Woêvre, the deposits reach depths of up to sixteen meters. A rectangular pit containing three complete vases dating from the Bronze Age was unearthed a few hundred meters from the mill. This discovery attests to the presence of this type of activity as early as 1200 to 900 BC.

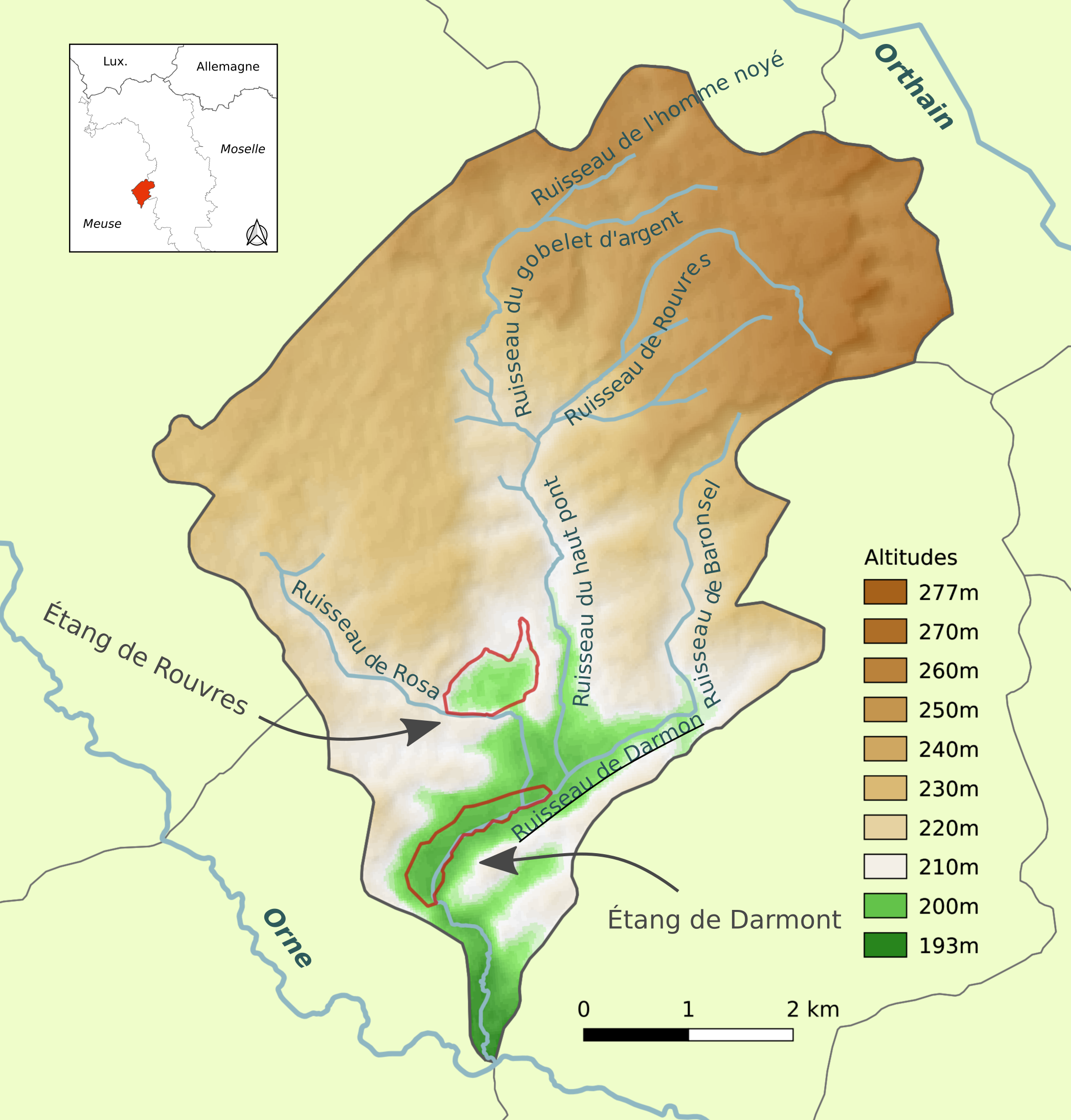
Watershed of the Rû du moulin de Darmont and the outlines of the Rouvres and Darmont ponds in 1826

The pond that fed the Rouvres mill differs from other water bodies in the Woëvre region in that, due to its porous surface and massive depths, the Étain slab was not a suitable layer for pond formation. Whereas the Woëvre plain is characterized by a high density of surface aquifers, the water in the slab seeps through cracks in the limestone layer and only appears in a few perennial emergences with inconstant flow. The permeability of the phreatic zone makes it highly sensitive to surface pollution, and the water is often unfit for consumption without prior treatment, particularly since the development of intensive agriculture, which is very important on the Pays Haut plateau to the east of the mill. Up until quite recently, water from the slab was only used to meet domestic and agricultural needs.

The development of the mill pond was made possible by a specific geological layout, due to the presence of impermeable soils held back by a very concentrated clay elevation created by contact with the Pays Haut limestone plateau. In contrast to the entire band to the east of the Étain slab, the transition between oolitic limestone and marly limestone is less clear-cut at mill level, due to the presence of marly elements on the lateral bands, joined at the surface by silt deposits. This arrangement favored the formation of a depression where water stagnation facilitated the development of a marshy area that was later converted into a pond.

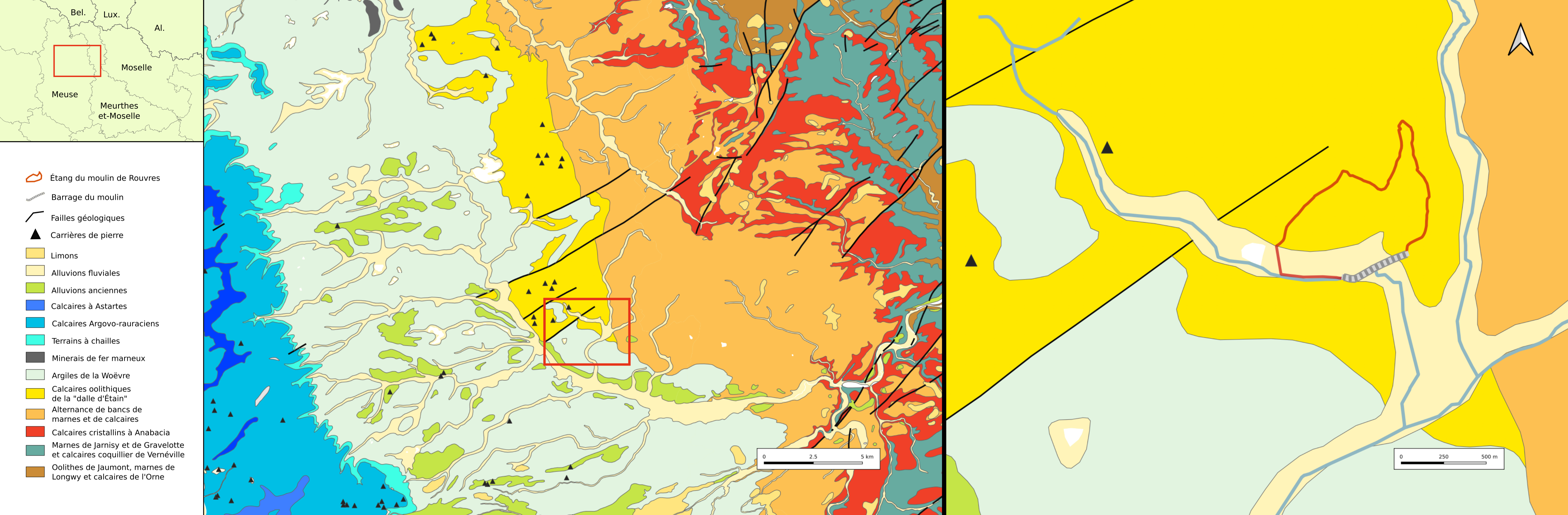
Geological structure of the lowland forming the Moulin de Rouvres pond on the scale of the Meuse

=== Hydrological functioning ===
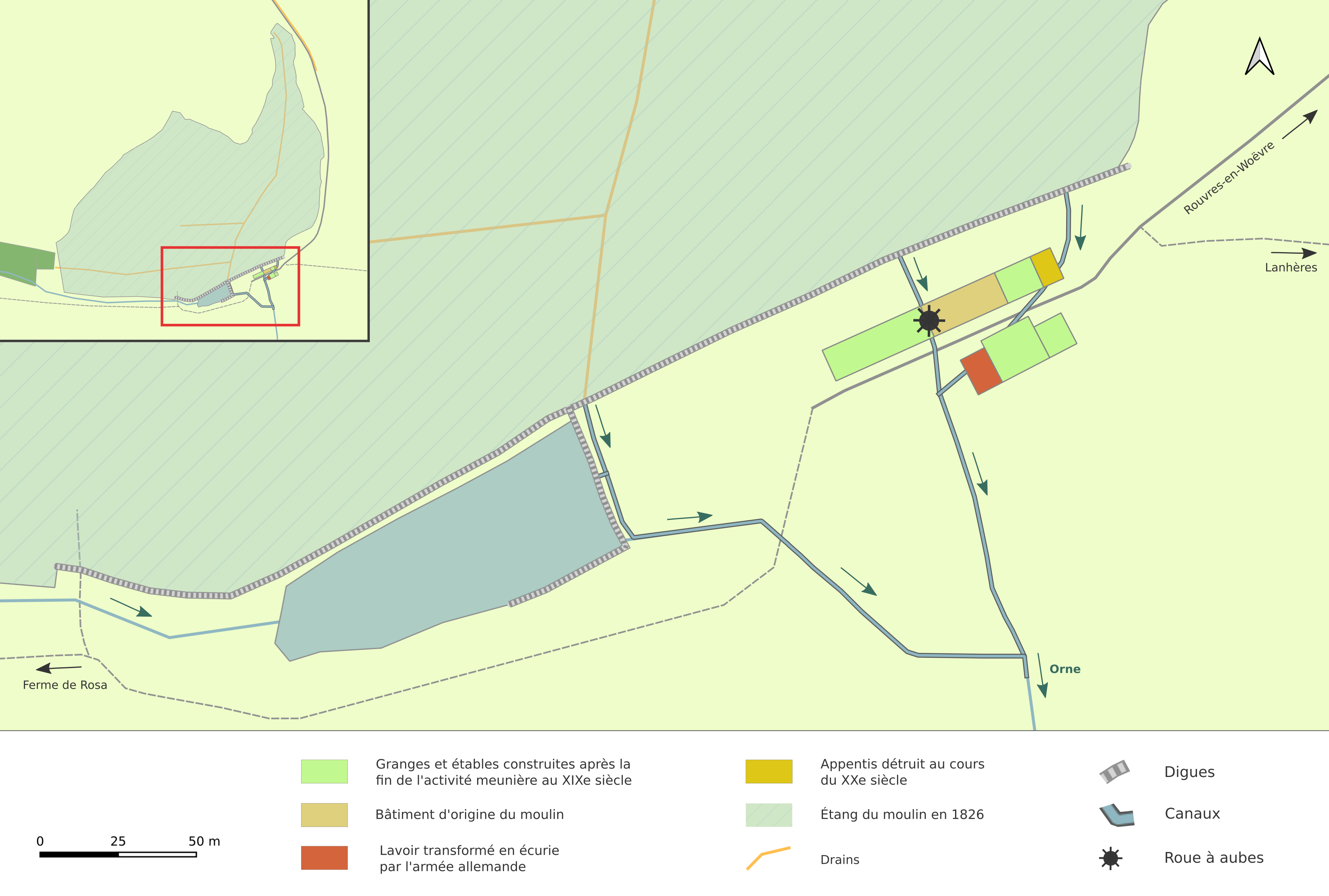
Plan of the Rouvres mill infrastructure

In the 13th century, Benedictine monks built an artificial pond using dikes and canals to adapt to natural and geological formations. The mill dike closed off the outlet from the lowland and raised the water level. At the beginning of the 19th century, the pond covered almost 43 hectares and captured water from the Ruisseau de Rosa and part of the watershed of the Ru du Moulin de Darmont. The excess water flowed into the Moulin de Darmont stream below, then into the Orne, a tributary of the Moselle and a sub-tributary of the Rhine. At the same time, a second, smaller pond was created by diverting water from the Ruisseau de Rosa.

The level of the pond was regulated by a series of three canals. When in operation, the mill was activated by one of the canals, which crossed the dike via an aqueduct and dropped over the blades of the water wheel. The paddle wheel was located on one of the mill's outer walls and was connected by a transmission mechanism to a grindstone inside the building. The grains, stored in the three stories above the millstone, were processed into flour and sent to the surrounding villages.

Following the draining of the pond, the mill facilities remained in place. Agricultural drains were dug to capture the water and channel it into the Darmont stream, allowing the land in the lowland to be cultivated and preventing the formation of a swamp once again. During World War I, German troops redeveloped the pond adjacent to the mill and built a third reservoir upstream to meet the water requirements of soldiers' daily consumption and the operation of steam engines.

== The Lords of Rouvres' mill ==
=== Origins and construction ===
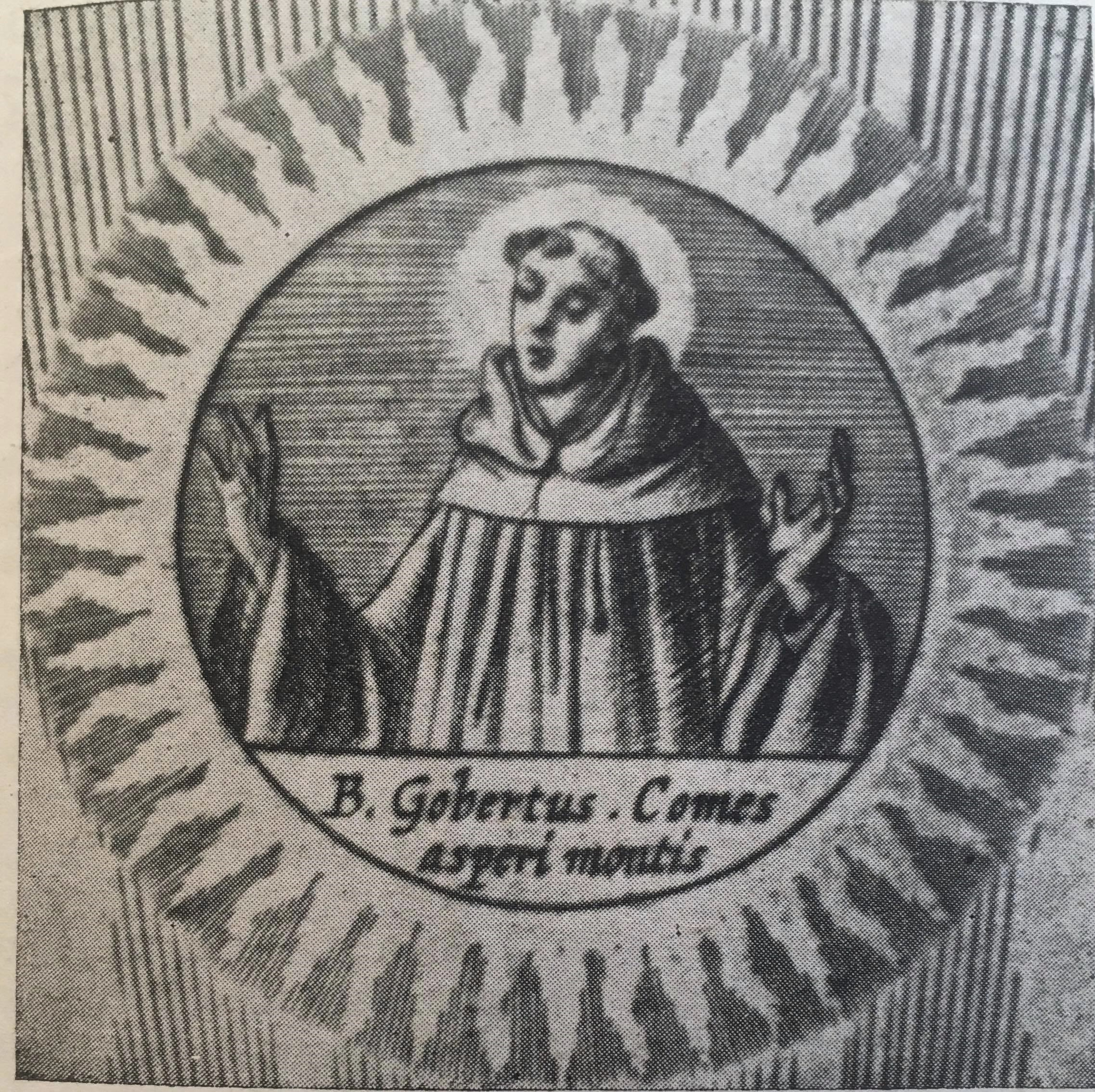
Gobert d'Aspremont (1187–1263), first knight mentioned as lord of the Rouvres mill

The first records of the Rouvres mill date back to the 13th century, at a time when manmade ponds and mills were becoming widespread in Lorraine. Downstream from the mill, a second pond, Darmont, was also used for fish farming and milling. These constructions were linked to the establishment of religious communities and abbeys. In Rouvres-en-Woëvre, Benedictine presence was proven in 962, when Bishop Wigfrid of Verdun decided to replace the community of Saint-Saturnin with that of Saint-Paul. A document from 972 mentions that this congregation drew income from the commune of Rouvres for the church and two mansus. However, the presence of the Benedictine abbey of Rosa, occupied by monks of Saint Paul, was recorded in 1144. In a document dated 1230, Gobert d'Aspremont first acknowledged the monks' ownership of the pond below the abbey and overlooking the mill.

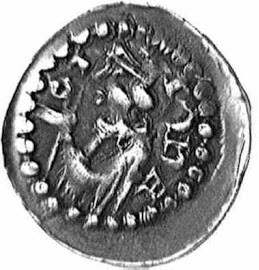
Jean I d'Aspremont, last lord of the House of Aspremont to rule the mill

References to the mill increased from the 15th century onwards, as the infrastructure was gradually extended. Between 1429 and 1430, thanks to the construction of a 300-meter dike, the pond was enlarged to 43 hectares. A series of three canals were built to regulate the height of the pond, while an aqueduct was constructed to drive the water wheel installed below the dike and to power the millstone located inside the building. Two construction projects were undertaken in the course of the 15th and 16th centuries. The first, in 1466, widened the causeway leading to the mill to facilitate access to the villages. The second, in 1556, improved the buildings and increased grain and flour storage capacity. In 1660, materials from the collapsed Orfonttaine mill, near Moulainville, were also used to repair and enlarge the mill.

=== Affiliation to the seigneury of Rouvres-en-Woëvre ===
Coat of arms of the de Beauvau family, to which Mathieu de Noviant-aux-prés belonged

While the construction of the Rouvres mill and pond is most probably linked to the presence of the Benedictines at Rosa, the profits from milling and fish farming were shared between the abbey and the lords of Rouvres. The origins of the seigneury can be traced back to the usufruct of the commune of Rouvres left by Bishop Richer of Verdun between 1098 and 1107 to his brother Albert, lord of Briey, on behalf of Matilda of Tuscany. Eventually, in 1144, the knight Albert de Romont ceded part of the Rouvres estate to the bishop of Verdun, Albéron de Chiny, on condition that it be administered by the Abbey of Saint Paul. This domain became property of the abbey of Rosa. However, this donation was contested in 1166 by Gobert V d'Aspremont, until he finally recognized it and added some agricultural land to the bequests. Thus, the division of property in the commune of Rouvres between the abbey and the lord of Rouvres was clarified in 1230 when Gobert VI d'Aspremont admitted ownership of the pond to the Rosa estate, while retaining the right to fish and the income from the mill.

Around 1339, the Rouvres mill left the domain of the House of Aspremont. On this date, in exchange for the fortified house of Mandre and high and low justice on this site, Jean I d'Apremont ceded part of his property in Rouvres, including the mill and the terrain to Mathieu de Noviant-aux-prés, lord of Mandres-aux-Quatre-Tours. Until the annexation of Lorraine and Barrois by the kingdom of France in 1766, Mathieu de Noviant-aux-prés's descendants were the beneficiaries of the mill's revenues, in fief to the Bishopric of Verdun. Mathieu de Noviant-aux-prés then created the Cour de Rouvres, sometimes called the Grande Cour de Rouvres, whose assets consisted, according to a vidimus of 1377, of a house with its outbuildings, the communal ovens of Rouvres and Lanhères, as well as various rents on the mill, meadows, land, and the bourgeoisie of Rouvres.

The accounts of the Étain provostry faithfully reveal the names of the undivided beneficiaries of rents on the Rouvres mill and land. Under the terms of the deed of 1339, these consisted of a rent of 5 reds (nets) from the mill's production and 6 reds (fanegas) of oat from the land's production. Between 1456 and 1457, it is reported that Louis de Haraucourt, as seigneur de Gondrecourt en Wœvre, received a sum of 4 livres on the land and mill of Rouvres. In 1571, 1612, 1664, and 1699, the provost's office reports that Ancherin de la Réaulté, then Mathieu de la Réaulté, Goeury Warion and finally François Warion received rents of 8 rases of oats from the land and 4 rases (fanegas) of wheat from the mill.

=== The fall of Cour de Rouvres and decline of milling ===
Between 1450 and 1778, the Cour de Rouvres fief was divided among several co-owners as a result of partition. Although it played an important economic role in Lorraine, it was severely affected by the Thirty Years' War and the French occupation. The Cour de Rouvres was devastated during this period. The courtyard house was destroyed, and only three walls (north, south and west) remained. In 1766, with the annexation of the Duchy of Lorraine and of Bar, the mill and lands were purchased by the Kingdom of France. The dovecote and the communal ovens of Rouvres and Lanhère disappeared during the 18th century. According to the last reorganization of 1778, the Court only consisted of a landed property, a right over the bourgeoisie of Rouvres, and some fines related to "rural minutiae".

After the Revolution, the Abbey of Rosa was dismantled, as for the mill and pond, were sold as national property. During the 19th century, the mill lost importance with the advent of industrial gristmills, while fish farming suffered from competition with fish from the French coast. In 1889, the mill pond dried up and the two adjoining ponds became swamps. The fishermen's houses surrounding the pond were dismantled. The mill was transformed into a farm and sold to a private owner in the early 20th century. Two barns, a sheepfold and a washhouse were built to meet the new needs of the occupants.

The Rouvres mill and its pond are shown on the Napoleonic cadastre of 1827.

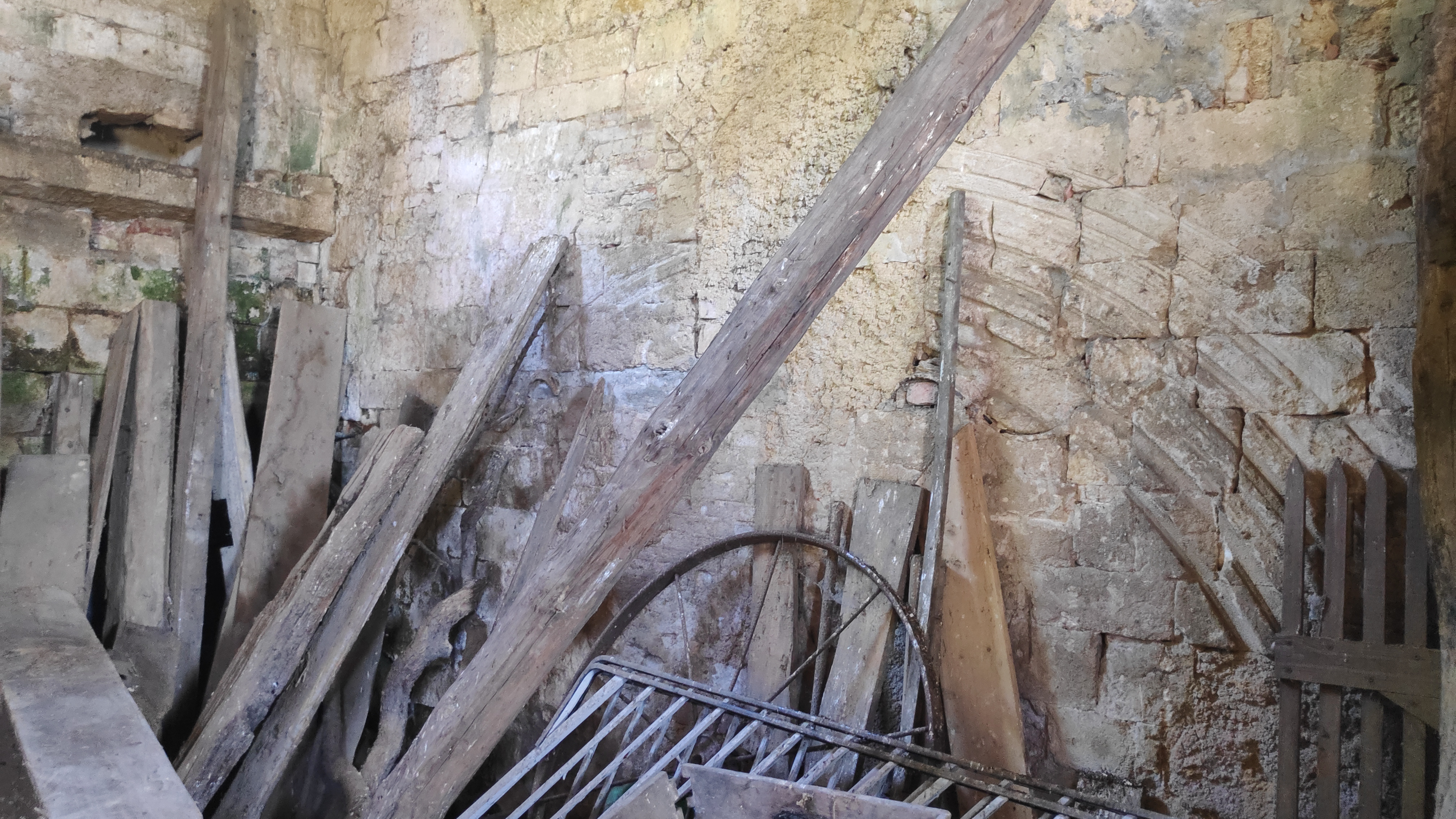
Traces of the old paddlewheel on the west wall of the Rouvres mill.

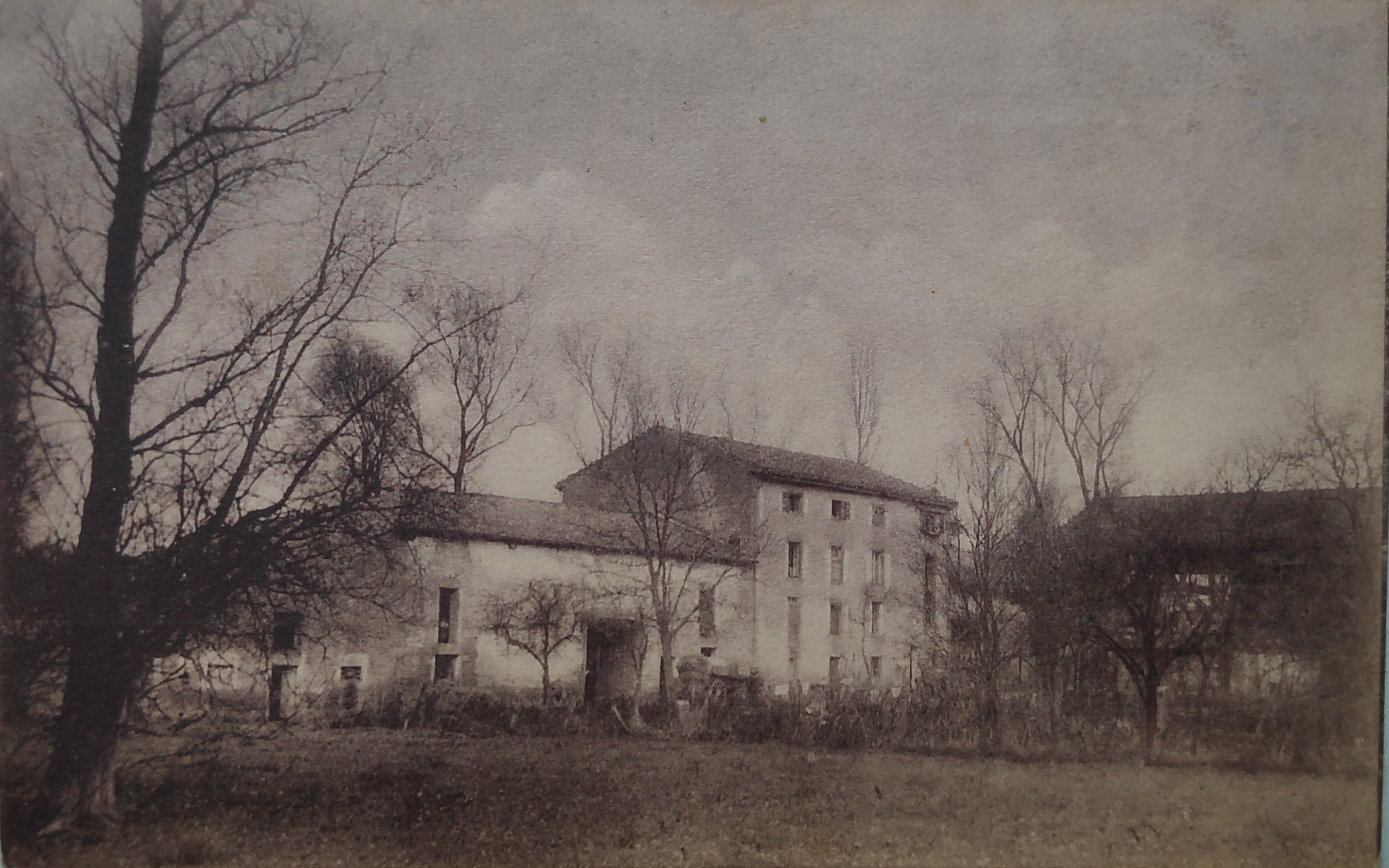
The Rouvres mill circa 1914.

== From German occupation to the present day ==
=== Battle of Étain-Rouvres ===
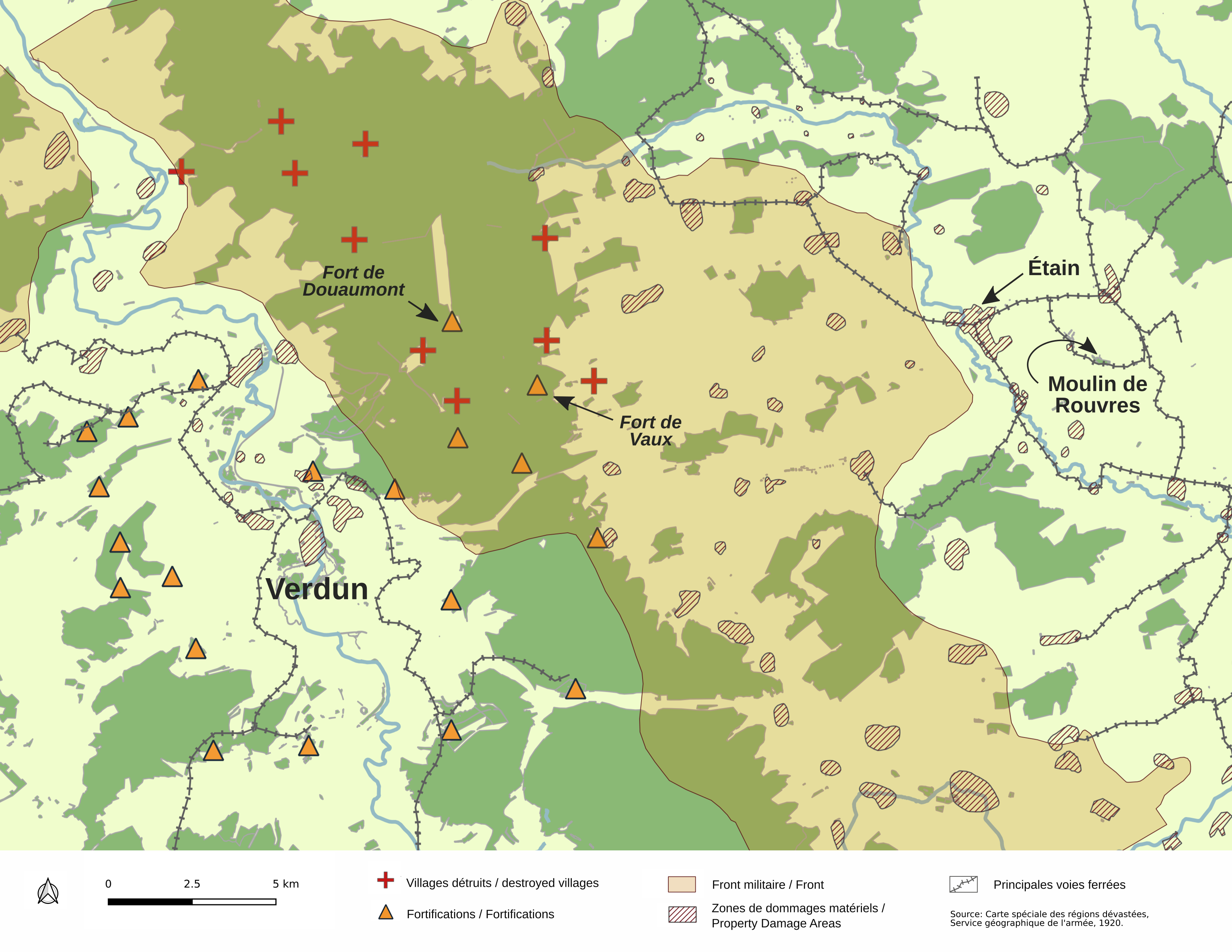
The front line between Verdun and the Rouvres mill during World War I

At the outbreak of World War I, the Rouvres mill found itself at the heart of the battles of August 24–25, 1914. During the German advance, the mill served as a Verbandplatz (first-aid post) for the German army's 45 Landwhr brigade. Stretcher-bearers brought the wounded from the Ldw.I.R100 and Ldw.I.R. 102 regiments caught on the front line between Boinville-en-Woëvre and Warcq. During the battle, the village of Rouvres-en-Woëvre was completely destroyed and its inhabitants shot by the German army. The mill, however, suffered no damage.

=== A rear base close to the front line ===
When the position of the two armies stabilized, the mill became a permanent first-aid post, a supply center and an important billet for German troops engaged in the Battle of Verdun. Protected from the French army by the wooded terrain, the mill was a strategic base from which the Germans could link up with the front.

Several thousand men were stationed there before leaving for the front or being transferred to other war zones. On their return from combat, soldiers are stripped of their clothes, washed, shaved, and de-haired before being allowed to return to their quarters. The violence of the fighting around the Douaumont and Vaux forts led to an influx of wounded soldiers, who were either treated on the spot or sent to Metz. Behind the lines, the mill provided a place to rest, sheltered from the bombardments and fighting to which the troops returning from the front had been exposed for several weeks. Archival documents and remains show that, in addition to its military function, the base of the mill was also a convivial place for many soldiers.

The German army set up a base served by a gravel road, a 0.60-metre railroad, pressurized water, electricity, and a telephone. Over a 700-meter stretch, the officers built barracks, wooden chalets, sanitary facilities, showers, and a bandstand in wood, cob, brick, and prefabricated materials. The old washhouse was converted into a stable and lean-to building as an extension of the mill, which was subsequently destroyed after the war. The main building was refurbished. A medical circuit is set up inside to care for soldiers returning from the front. The building's basements are fitted out as a warehouse, kitchen, and infirmary. Upstairs, dormitories housed soldiers and the wounded. The officers were housed in a building built directly on the dike.

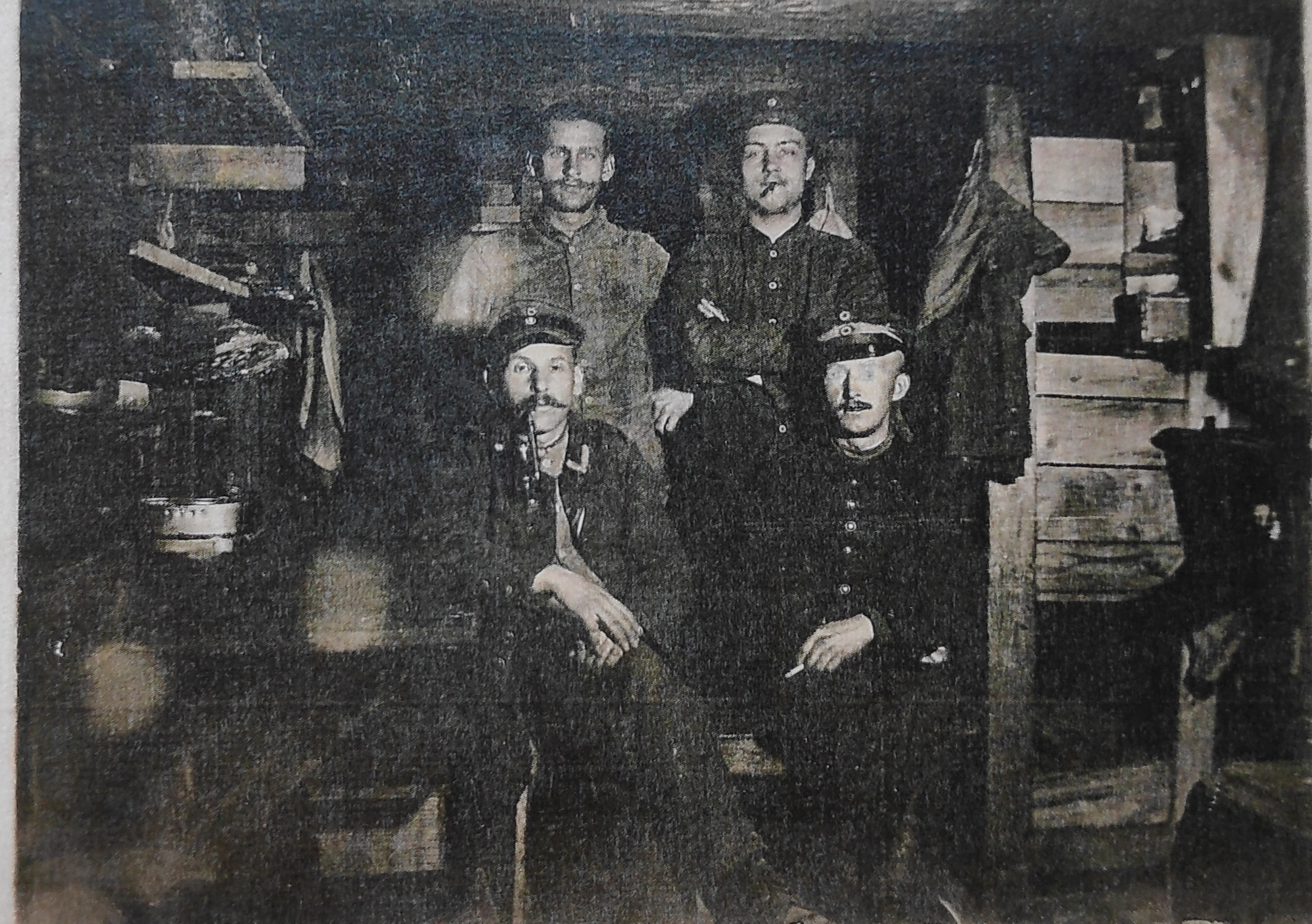
Soldiers garrisoned at the Rouvres mill.

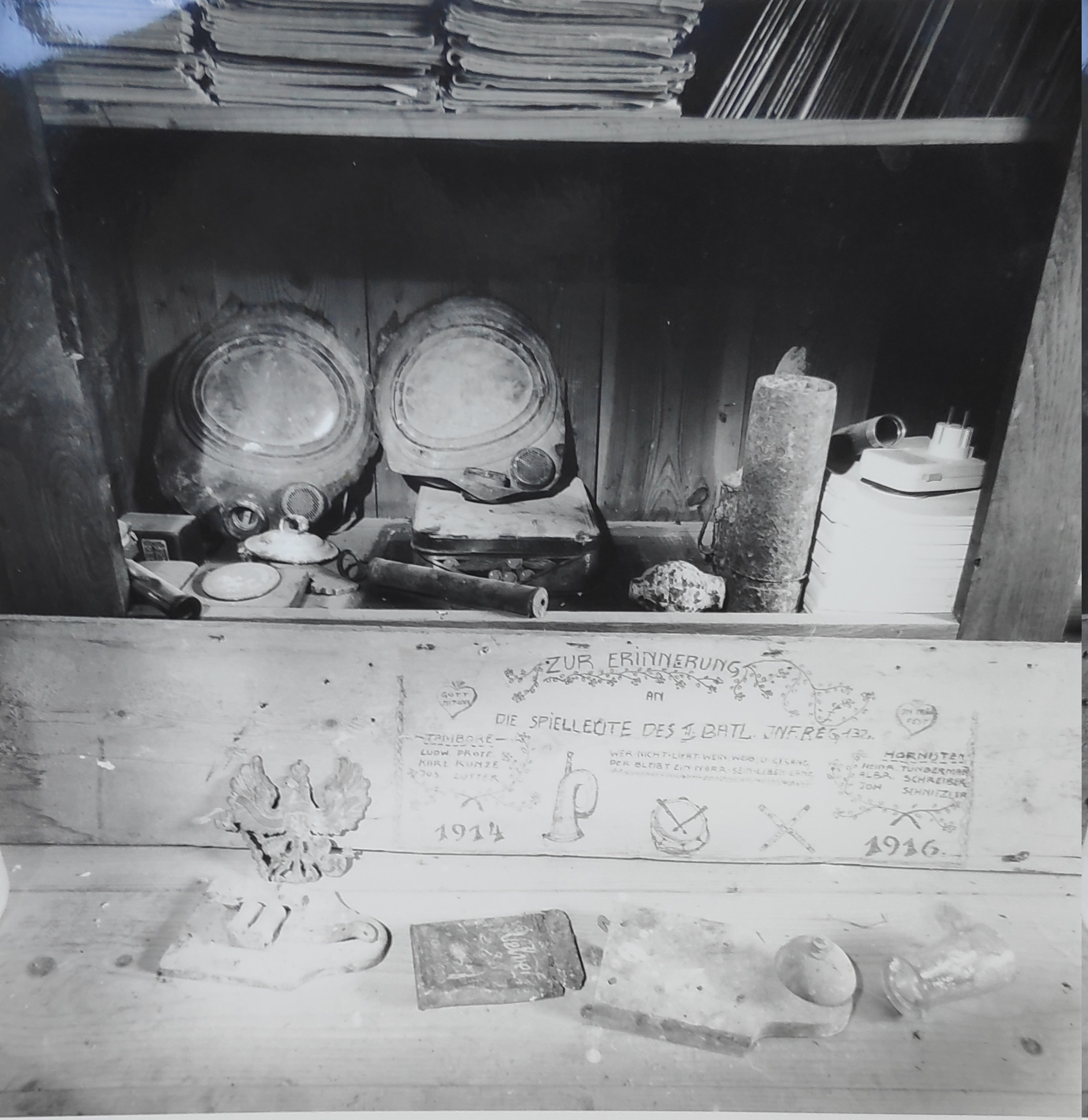
Tablet engraved by a soldier during the mill's occupation.

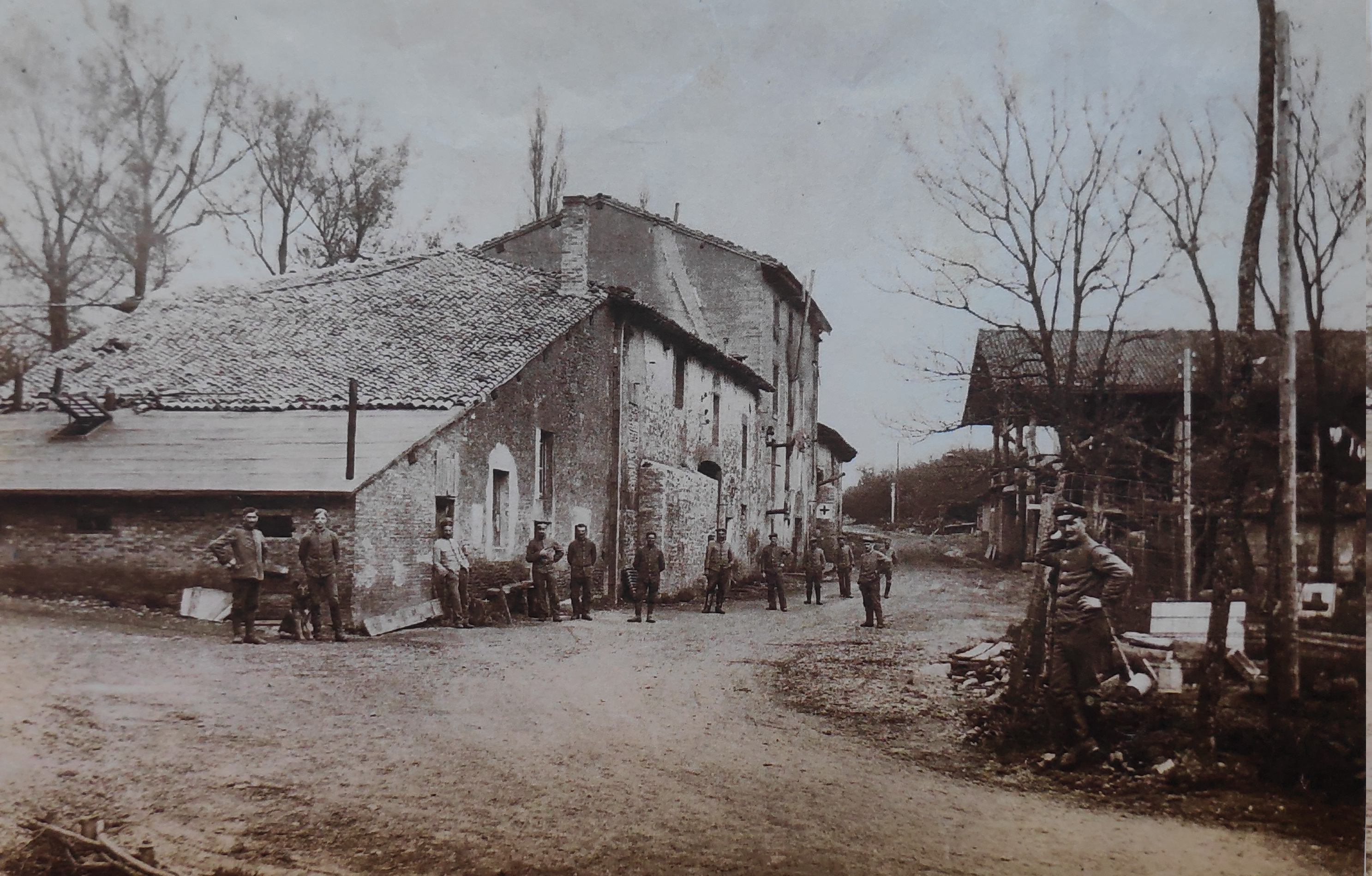
A ccene of garrison daily life.

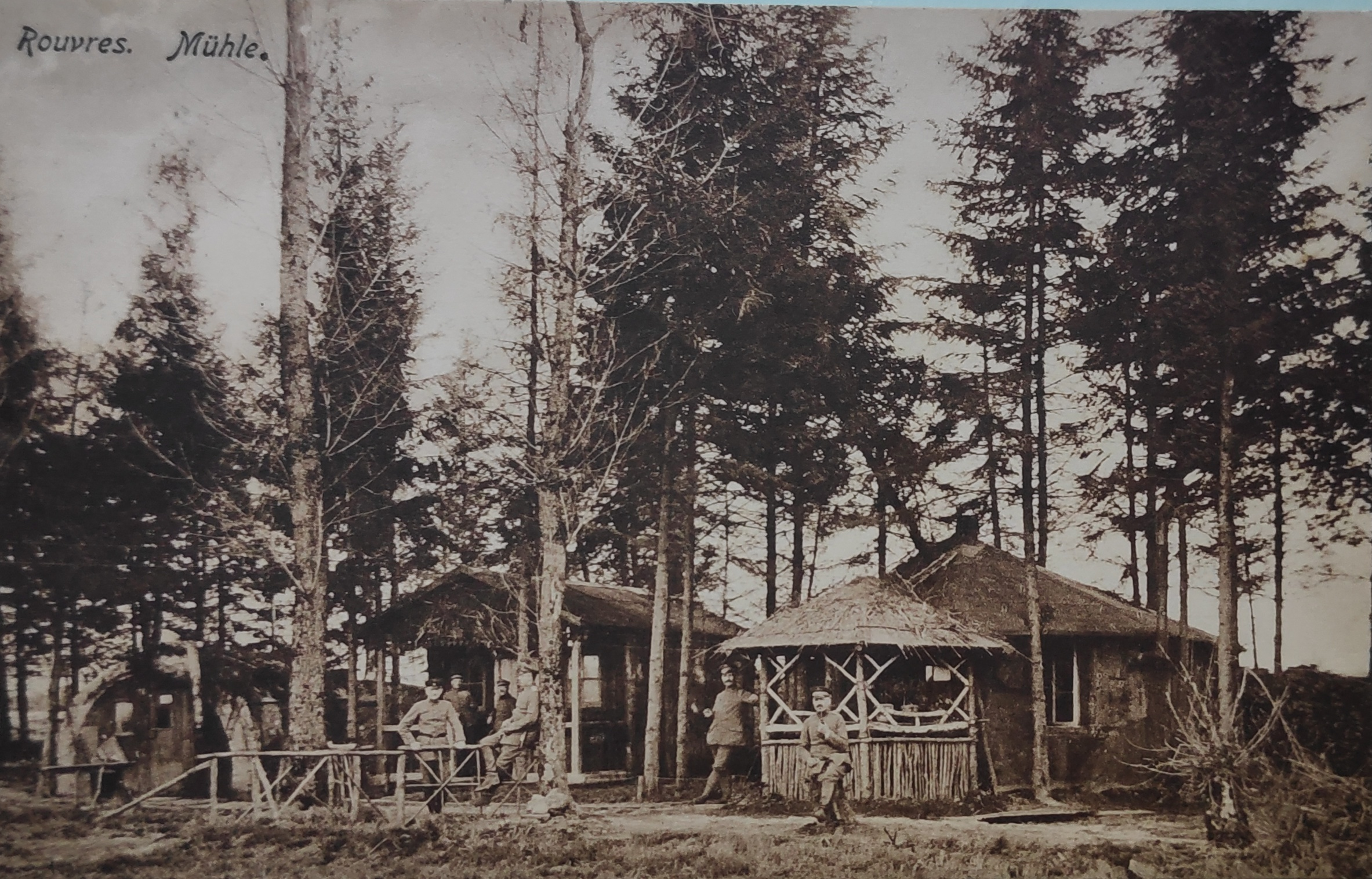
Bandstand built by the German army.

=== Towards heritage protection ===
The German wooden installations were dismantled after the war, but the concrete structures remained in place. Three barracks, several bunkers, a brick command post, the station, and the hairdresser's shop survived. After the Armistice, the mill returned to its agricultural function, focusing on sheep and cattle breeding as well as polyculture. This activity continued until the 1990s, when production declined and was reduced to a small herd of cattle. The buildings gradually fell into disrepair and, by the end of the century, the roofs were badly damaged, the framework was in danger of collapsing and the dike channels were partly blocked. In the early 2000s, the mill was purchased. Restoration work initially focused on ensuring the long-term stabilization of the main buildings by renovating the roofs, then enhancing the medieval and German remains. In 2011, in the run-up to the centenary of World War I, a local collective began restoring the German facilities, rebuilding some of the demolished barracks, and, in 2012, opening a museum displaying the relics found on site. Furniture, weapons, and remnants of the soldiers' domestic life illustrate the daily lives of the soldiers who occupied the mill during the war.

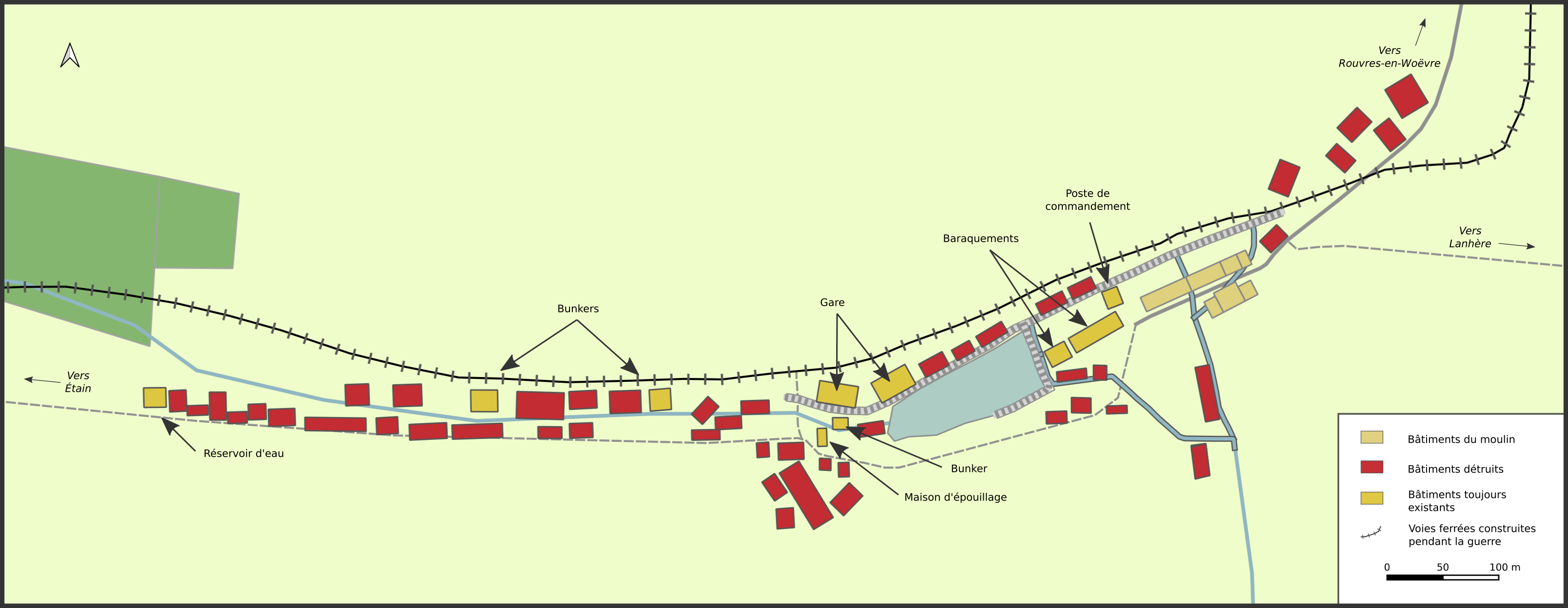
Plan of German installations at the Rouvres mill during the First World War

== See also ==
- fr:Histoire de la Meuse
- World War I
- Watermill

== Bibliography ==
=== Books ===
- Philippe Burtscher and François Hoff, Les fortifications allemandes d'Alsace-Lorraine, 1870-1918: de la défense des frontières à la Grande guerre, Paris, Histoires & Collections, 2009, 66 p. ISBN 978-2-35250-070-4, 2-35250-070-2, OCLC 470750150
- Comité des travaux historiques et scientifiques, Bulletin de la section de géographie, Paris, Imprimerie nationale, 1925.
- Nicolas Czubak, La guerre aux portes de Saint-Mihiel, Louviers, Ysec, 2016, 150 p. ISBN 978-2-84673-244-4, 2-84673-244-2, OCLC 959978865
- Nicolas Czubak, Étain-Buzy. Première victoire devant Verdun (August 24th and 25th 1914), Louviers, Ysec, 2013, 79 p. ISBN 978-2-84673-170-6, 2-84673-170-5, OCLC 866826853
- Kévin Goeuriot and Nicolas Czubak, Jusqu'au bout. Août-septembre 1914, la Lorraine bascule dans la guerre, Metz, Éditions Serpenoise, 2013, 247 p. ISBN 978-2-87692-958-6, 2-87692-958-9, OCLC 893756842
- Jean-Luc Kaluzko and Frédéric Radet, La face cachée. Empreintes de l'armée allemande, 1914-1918, Verdun, Connaissance de la Meuse, 2000 ISBN 2-9503985-4-5, 978-2-9503985-4-3 OCLC 76448736
- Henry Lemoine, Département de la Meuse, dictionnaire des communes, Paris, Comédit, 1991, 840 p. ISBN 2-909112-04-7, 978-2-909112-04-6, OCLC 27907811
- Adolphe Marchal, Inventaire-sommaire des archives départementales antérieures à 1790 de Meuse, t. 1, Paris, Imprimerie et librairie administratives de Paul Dupont, 1875.
- Jean-Noël Mathieu, Les seigneurs de Rouvres-en-Woëvre, Paris, Jean-Noël Mathieu, 1998, 94 p. ISBN 2-9512517-0-X, 978-2-9512517-0-0 OCLC 48924352

=== Articles ===
- Jacques Allouc, Dominique Harmand and Jacques Le Roux, Carte géologique à 1/50000, feuille Revigny-sur-Ornain (190) et Notice explicative, Orléans, BRGM, 2007.
- Karine Boulanger, Cédric Moulis, David Gucker and Dominique Heckenbenner, "Lorraine. "La pierre aux périodes historiques en Lorraine, de l'extraction à la mise en œuvre", Archéologie médiévale, no. 42, December 1, 2012 (ISSN 0153-9337 and 2608-4228, DOI 10.4000/archeomed.11145, read online archive, accessed January 29, 2021)
- Vincent Fister, Benoît Losson, Luc Manceau and Sébastien Lebaut, "L'hydrosystème de l'étang d'Amel (Meuse, France) : fonctionnement hydro-sédimentaire d'un petit bassin karstique et évaluation de l'érosion", Géomorphologie : relief, processus, environnement, vol. 21, no. 2, July 31, 2015, pp. 101–114 (ISSN 1266-5304, DOI 10.4000/geomorphologie.10917, read online archive, accessed January 29, 2021)
- P. Gamez, F. Gras and M. Sary, "Le revers de la Dalle d'Etain en Lorraine septentrionale. Un exemple de l'influence du kart sur la géodynamique externe", Annales de la Société géologique de Belgique, vol. 102, 1979, p. 47-52
- Jean Marcer, Données géologiques et hydrogéologiques sur les feuilles topographiques au 1/50 000, Étain et VigneulleS, Orléans, BRGM, 1969.
- Xavier Margarit, "Rapport de diagnostic archéologique du site de Fond de Rosâ à Rouvres-en-Woëvre (Meuse)", Service régional de l'Archéologie, 2000.
- Denis Mathis and Anne Mathis, "Anciens et nouveaux terroirs d'étangs en Lorraine", Revue Géographique de l'Est, vol. 56, nos 1–2, April 22, 2016 (ISSN 0035-3213, DOI 10.4000/rge.5712, read online archive, accessed February 11, 2021)
- Pierre Maubeuge, Études géologiques sur le territoire de la feuille d'Étain, Nancy, Bulletin de la société des sciences de Nancy, 1952.
- Claude Mégien, Synthèse géologique du bassin de Paris, Orléans, BRGM, 1980.
- Simon Ritz and Sébastien Viller, "L'exploitation des limcaires en plaquettes de la Dalle d'Étain dans l'agglomération gallo-romaine de Senon (Meuse)", in Karine Boulanger, Cédric Moulis, Pierre à Pierre : économie de la pierre aux périodes historiques en Lorraine et régions limitrophes (Ier s. av. J.-C. XVIIe s.), Actes du colloque de Nancy, November 5th-6th, 2015, Nancy, Presses universitaires de Nancy, 2020 (ISBN 2-8143-0556-5)
- Laurent Vermard, Frédéric Adam and Franck Thiériot, "Le site funéraire du Bronze final de Void-Vacon "le Vé" (Meuse, Lorraine)", Bulletin de la Société préhistorique française, vol. 107, no 2, 2010, pp. 353–370 (ISSN 0249-7638, DOI 10.3406/bspf.2010.13932, read online archive, accessed January 29, 2021)
