= Nelson College =

State secondary school in New Zealand

Location
- 67 Waimea Road; Nelson, 7010; New Zealand; 41°17′8″S 173°16′36″E

Information
- Type: State secondary, day and boarding
- Motto: Latin: Pietas Probitas et Sapientia (Loyalty, honesty and wisdom)
- Established: 7 April 1856; 170 years ago
- Sister school: Nelson College for Girls
- Ministry of Education Institution no.: 294
- Headmaster: Richard Washington
- Gender: Boys
- Enrolment: 1,024 (July 2026)
- Houses: Barnicoat; Chaytor; Domett; Kahurangi; Monro; Robinson; Rutherford
- Colours: Navy and light blue
- Socio-economic decile: 7
- Website: www.nelson.school.nz

Nelson College is the oldest state secondary school in New Zealand, a feat achieved in part thanks to its original inception as a private school. It is an all-boys school in the City of Nelson that teaches from years 9 to 13. In addition, it runs a private preparatory school for year 7 and 8 boys. The school also has places for boarders, who live in two boarding houses adjacent to the main school buildings on the same campus.

A Nelson College old boy, Charles Monro, was instrumental in introducing the game of rugby into New Zealand.

== History ==
The school opened with eight students on 7 April 1856 in premises in Trafalgar Square, Nelson, but shortly thereafter moved to a site in Manuka Street. In 1861, the school moved again to its current site in Waimea Road. The Deed of Foundation was signed in 1857 and set out the curriculum to be followed by the college. It included English language and literature, one or more modern languages, geography, mathematics, classics, history, drawing, music and such other branches of science as the Council of Governors should determine. The Deed stated that the purpose of the school was the "advancement of religion and morality, and the promotion of useful knowledge, by offering to the youth of the Province general education of a superior character."

In 1858, the General Assembly passed the Nelson College Act, which confirmed the status of the school. There were nine initial trustees, including Charles Elliott, David Monro, John Barnicoat, Charles Bigg Wither, William Wells, and Alfred Domett. In that same year, Alfred Fell gifted the common seal, containing the college's badge and motto, "Pietas, Probitas et Sapientia" (Loyalty, honesty and wisdom). A team from Nelson College took part in the first game of rugby played in New Zealand, against the Nelson Rugby Football Club on 14 May 1870 at what is now known as the Botanic Reserve, Nelson, and, in 1876, the first inter-College rugby match in New Zealand was played between Nelson College and Wellington College.

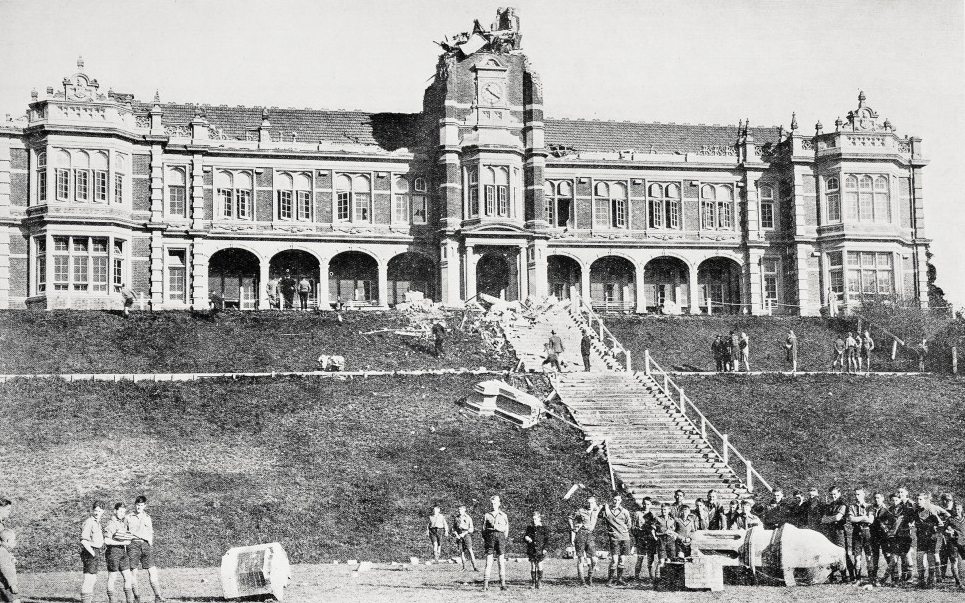
The damaged tower of the main building at Nelson College following the 1929 Murchison earthquake

On 7 December 1904, the college was almost completely destroyed by fire. The main building, designed by William Beatson, was said to be a "miniature of Eton," the architect being an old Etonian. In 1926, Nelson College was invited to join the annual rugby tournament between Christ's College, Wanganui Collegiate School and Wellington College, known as the "Quadrangular". In the 1929 Murchison earthquake, the main building of the college was once again severely damaged, although only two boys were injured.

In 2011, Nelson College became the first all-boys college in New Zealand to form a gay-straight alliance support group. The alliance operated from its own room. In 2017, the group was re-formed, after a failed attempt in 2015.

In 2019, long-serving and retiring headmaster Gary O'Shea claimed that the school needed more girls to stay up-to-date.

== House system ==
The college has a house system with, as of 16 May 2019, six different houses that compete across a range of sporting codes, including cross country running and swimming, together with varied cultural activities:

- Barnicoat–Rutherford combined (white & black)
- Chaytor (red)
- Domett (green)
- Monro (blue)
- Robinson (orange)
- Kahurangi (yellow)

The two boarding houses, Rutherford and Barnicoat, recently underwent a five-year refurbishment. A third boarding house, Fell, was closed to boarders at the end of 2018, and is now available for lease, predominantly to sports and community groups.

== Notable staff ==
- William Allen, artist
- Gilbert Archey, zoologist, museum director, ethnologist
- Phil Costley, athlete
- Edmond de Montalk, language teacher, storekeeper
- Andrew Goodman, rugby union player
- John Gully, artist
- Wilfrid Nelson Isaac, jeweller, art school director
- Frank Milner, school principal, educationalist
- Harold Nelson, athlete
- William Sutch, economist, public servant
- Matthew Toynbee, cricketer

=== Headmasters ===
Since its foundation in 1856, Nelson College has had 22 headmasters. The following is a complete list:

	Name	Term
1	John Charles Bagshaw	1856–1858
2	George Heppel	1859–1861
3	Reginald Broughton	1862
4	John Danforth Greenwood	1863–1865
5	Charles Lendrick MacLean	1866–1868
6	Frank Churchill Simmons	1868–1876
7	John Chapman Andrew	1876–1886
8	William Justice Ford	1886–1888
9	John William Joynt	1889–1898
10	William Still Littlejohn	1899–1903
11	Harry Lewis Fowler	1904–1921
12	Charles Harrington Broad	1922–1933
13	Herbert Victor Searle	1933–1956
14	Basil Henry Wakelin	1957–1969
15	E.J. "Doug" Brewster	1970–1981
16	Barry Beckingsale	1981–1985
17	Tony Cooper	1985–1988
18	Gary Bowler	1988–1995
19	Salvi Gargiulo	1995–2006
20	Gary O'Shea	2006–2020
21	Richard Dykes	2020–2023
22	Richard Washington	2024–present

== Notable alumni ==
- Harry Atkinson, socialist
- Michael Baigent, writer
- Tim Bell, computer scientist
- Leo Bensemann, artist
- Bronson Beri, basketball player
- Ethan Blackadder, rugby union player
- Wallace Chapman, TV & radio presenter
- Basil Collyns, Battle of Britain pilot and flying ace
- Wyatt Crockett, rugby union player
- Mitchell Drummond, rugby union player
- Jock Edwards, cricketer
- Henry Fa'arodo, footballer
- Leicester Fainga'anuku, rugby union player
- David Havili, rugby union player
- Jim Henderson, writer and broadcaster
- William Hudson, civil engineer
- Mitchell Hunt, rugby union player
- Syd Jackson, Māori activist
- Jang Keun-suk, Korean actor, singer, and model
- Phill Jones, basketballer
- Gerald R. Leighton, zoologist
- James Lowe, rugby union player
- Nev MacEwan, rugby union player
- Don McKinnon, former Commonwealth Secretary-General
- Simon Mannering, rugby league player
- James Marshall, rugby union player
- Kerry Marshall, former mayor of Richmond borough, Tasman and Nelson
- Julian Matthews, middle-distance athlete
- Ben May, rugby union player
- Charles Monro, introduced rugby to New Zealand
- Tex Morton, singer
- Jack Newman, cricketer and businessman
- Geoffrey Palmer, former Prime Minister of New Zealand
- Jared Payne, rugby union player
- Wallace (Bill) Rowling, former Prime Minister of New Zealand
- Ernest Rutherford, 1st Baron Rutherford of Nelson, Nobel laureate, chemist and physicist
- Rex Sellers, sailor
- Fletcher Smith, rugby union player
- Leonard Trent, Battle of Britain pilot and Victoria Cross recipient
- Mika Vukona, basketballer
- Guy Williams, comedian
- Paul Williams, comedian
- Harry Wollaston, senior Australian public servant
