= Basil Collyns =

New Zealand flying ace

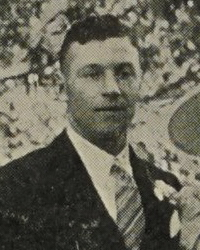
- Collyns in 1940
- Born: 24 February 1913; Greymouth, New Zealand
- Died: 20 August 1944 (aged 31) near Rouvres, France
- Military career
- Allegiance: New Zealand
- Branch: Royal New Zealand Air Force
- Service years: 1939–1944
- Rank: Flight Lieutenant
- Nickname: Buck
- Units: No. 238 Squadron; No. 1 Squadron; No. 243 Squadron; No. 65 Squadron; No. 19 Squadron
- Conflicts: Second World War; Battle of Britain; Channel Front; Operation Overlord
- Awards: Distinguished Flying Cross

Basil Gordon Collyns, DFC (24 February 1913 – 20 August 1944) was a New Zealand flying ace of the Royal New Zealand Air Force (RNZAF) during the Second World War. He is credited with at least five aerial victories.

Born in Greymouth, Collyns was called up to serve in the RNZAF in 1939. After completing his flight training, he was sent to the United Kingdom to serve with the Royal Air Force. After training on the Hawker Hurricane, he was posted to No. 238 Squadron with which he briefly flew in the latter stages of the Battle of Britain. In May 1941, he was transferred to No. 1 Squadron and flew on the Channel Front for six months, during which time he achieved his first aerial victory, before undertaking a period of instructing duties. Returning to operations in June 1942 with No. 243 Squadron, he flew a series of operations without success and spent most of the following year as an instructor. In January 1944, he was posted to No. 65 Squadron and undertook many sorties in support of Allied preparations for Operation Overlord, the D-Day landings. Transferred to No. No. 19 Squadron after the invasion of Normandy, he was killed in action on 20 August.

== Early life ==
Basil Gordon Collyns was born in Greymouth, New Zealand, on 24 February 1913 to Guy Shuckburgh Collyns, formerly an officer in the British Army, and his wife Jean née Armstrong. He was educated at Nelson College from 1925 to 1930, where he was the school bantamweight boxing champion in 1927. He then proceeded to Canterbury Agricultural College (now Lincoln University), and two years later he took up sheep farming at Kaikōura. Interested in flying with the Royal Air Force (RAF), in March 1939, he made an unsuccessful application for a short service commission. He joined the Marlborough Aero Club in June and was placed on the Civil Reserve of Pilots.

== Second World War ==
In November 1939, with the Second World War now underway, Collyns, who was nicknamed "Buck", was called up from the Civil Reserve to join the Royal New Zealand Air Force. He went to No. 1 Elementary Flying Training School at Taieri as an airman pilot in December and in March 1940 proceeded to No. 2 Flying Training School in Woodbourne. He gained his wings in May and, now commissioned as a pilot officer, two months later embarked for the United Kingdom to serve with the RAF. He married Margaret Lucy Churchward at the Church of the Nativity in Blenheim before his departure. Arriving in the United Kingdom in late August, Collyns went to No. 6 Operational Training Unit (OTU) at Sutton Bridge to gain experience on the Hawker Hurricane fighter. He was then posted to No. 238 Squadron at the end of September.

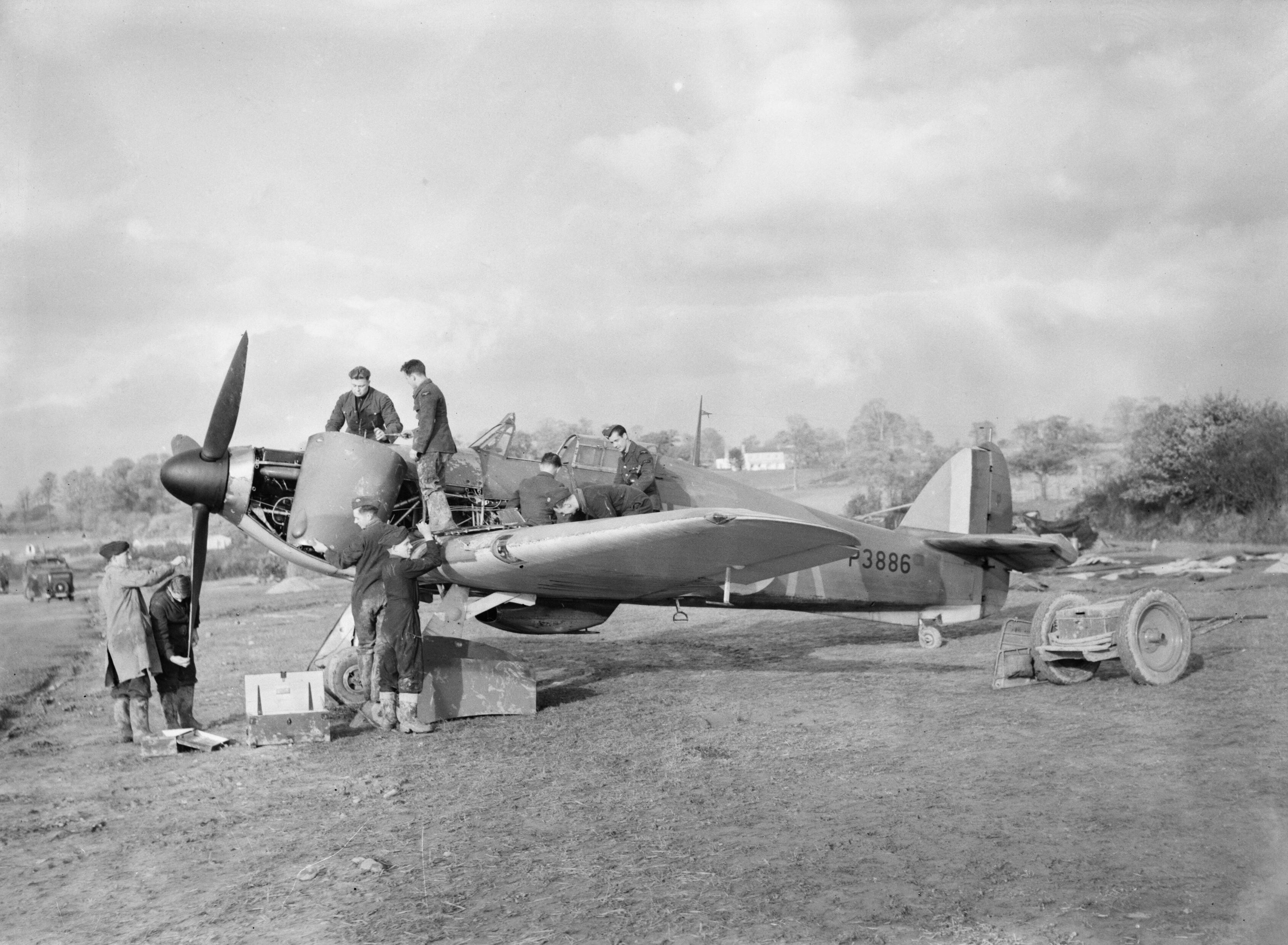
A Hawker Hurricane of No. 601 Squadron being serviced, November 1940

=== Battle of Britain ===
At the time Collyns joined No. 238 Squadron, it was part of No. 10 Group. Based at Middle Wallop and operating the Hurricane, it was flying extensively in the Battle of Britain to defend London as the Luftwaffe began to increasingly target the city. Collyns took part in five sorties before he was briefly transferred to No. 601 Squadron, based at Exeter and also equipped with the Hurricane. He only flew on one operation before returning to his original unit in late November. By this time the pace of operations had slowed considerably, and for the next several months, there were only occasional sorties.

=== Channel Front ===
Collyns was posted to No. 1 Squadron in May 1941, going on to fly a Hurricane on 36 operations with the unit. On one of these, carried out on 21 June, he shot down a Messerschmitt Bf 109 fighter 6 miles (9.7 km) west of Boulogne. He was promoted to flying officer a week later. Having completed a tour of operations, in November he was put on instructor duties and assigned to No. 60 OTU at Leconfield. He returned to flying duties in June 1942, being promoted to flight lieutenant and posted to No. 243 Squadron. His new unit, based at Ouston, was equipped with Supermarine Spitfire fighters and regularly flew coastal patrols and interceptions against incoming Luftwaffe bombers. In September, Collyns moved to the Spitfire-equipped No. 222 Squadron, which was based in Scotland, as a flight commander and two months later was transferred again, this time to No. 485 Squadron, another Spitfire unit, at Kings Cliffe.

In December, Collyns was posted to the Air Fighting Development Unit (AFDU) at Duxford and remained here, apart from a one-month attachment to Sutton Bridge to attend the Central Gunnery School there, for seven months. On 15 February 1943, he was involved in a mid-air collision with another aircraft. The other pilot was killed while Collyns made a crash-landing without injury. In June he performed instructor duties again, this time as part of No. 1493 Flight at Eastchurch, teaching gunnery to trainee fighter pilots.

=== Operation Overlord ===
In January 1944 Collyns returned to operations with a posting to No. 65 Squadron, which was based at Gravesend as part of the 2nd Tactical Air Force and operated the North American Mustang III fighter, the first squadron in the RAF to be equipped with this type of aircraft. It was tasked with making sweeps to France and long-range bomber escort missions, later adding fighter-bombing duties as it operated in support of Operation Overlord, the forthcoming invasion of Normandy. On 19 April, he was credited with half shares in a damaged Junkers Ju 52 transport and Bf 109, both shot up while on the ground. While on a Ranger mission, where the RAF fighters flew well into occupied territory looking for targets of opportunity, he shot down a Junkers Ju 88 medium bomber and shared in the destruction of another, both near Aalborg, on 17 May. On 10 June, he destroyed a Bf 109 near Caen.

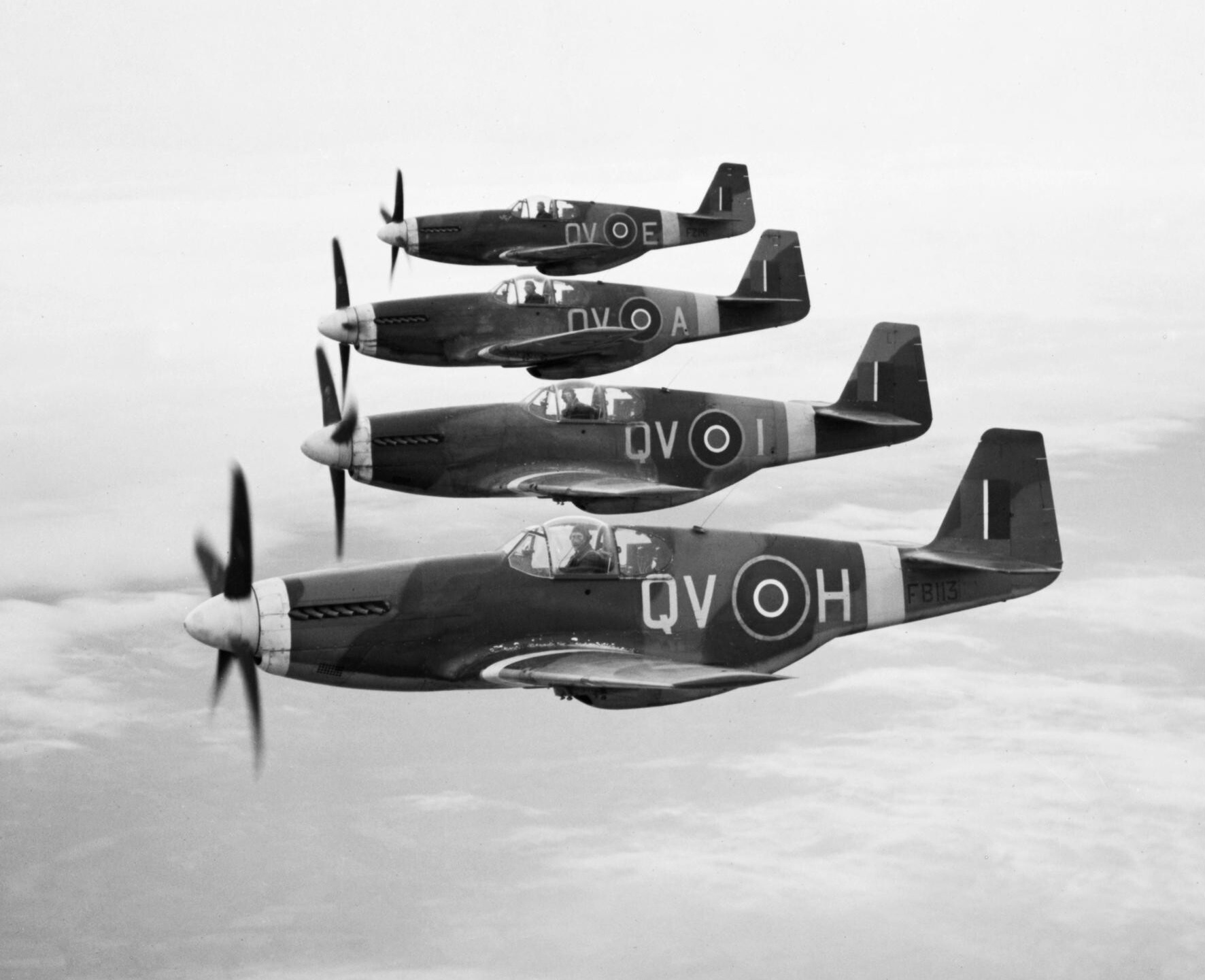
Mustang IIIs of No. 19 Squadron

On 15 June, Collyns was transferred to No. 19 Squadron, which also flew the Mustang III, and five days later damaged a Focke-Wulf Fw 190 fighter near Dreux. On 22 June, while strafing German artillery positions, his Mustang was hit by anti-aircraft fire, and he had to bail out. He was collected by Allied soldiers and returned to England to rejoin his unit. He destroyed a Fw 190 on 9 August, sharing in the destruction of another on the same day near Chartres. By this time flying from a base in Normandy, on 15 August, he damaged two Fw 190s and also claimed a Bf 109 as probably destroyed near Dreux. Flying east of Paris on 20 August, he shot down a Fw 190 but then suffered the same fate himself. His Mustang crashed nearby Rouvres, and he was thrown from the cockpit and killed.

Collyns was posthumously awarded the Distinguished Flying Cross. The citation, published in The London Gazette read:

This officer, now on his second tour of operational flying, has completed a large number of sorties. As flight commander, he has led his flight with outstanding skill and courage and has inflicted much damage on the enemy. During August, 1944, the squadron met a large force of enemy aircraft, and Flight Lieutenant Collyns displayed considerable ability and initiative by leading his flight to attack the enemy top cover, thus enabling the remainder of the squadron to engage the lower enemy formation. This officer has destroyed 7 enemy aircraft and damaged many others.

— London Gazette, No. 36750, 17 October 1944.

At the time of his death, Collyns was credited with having destroyed five German aircraft and with a share in two more, plus one probably destroyed and three damaged. He also damaged two German aircraft on the ground. Originally buried at Rouvres, after the war his remains were moved to Villenueve-St. Georges Communal Cemetery, to the south-east of Paris.
