= Geoffrey Potocki de Montalk =

New Zealand poet and polemicist

Count Geoffrey Potocki de Montalk
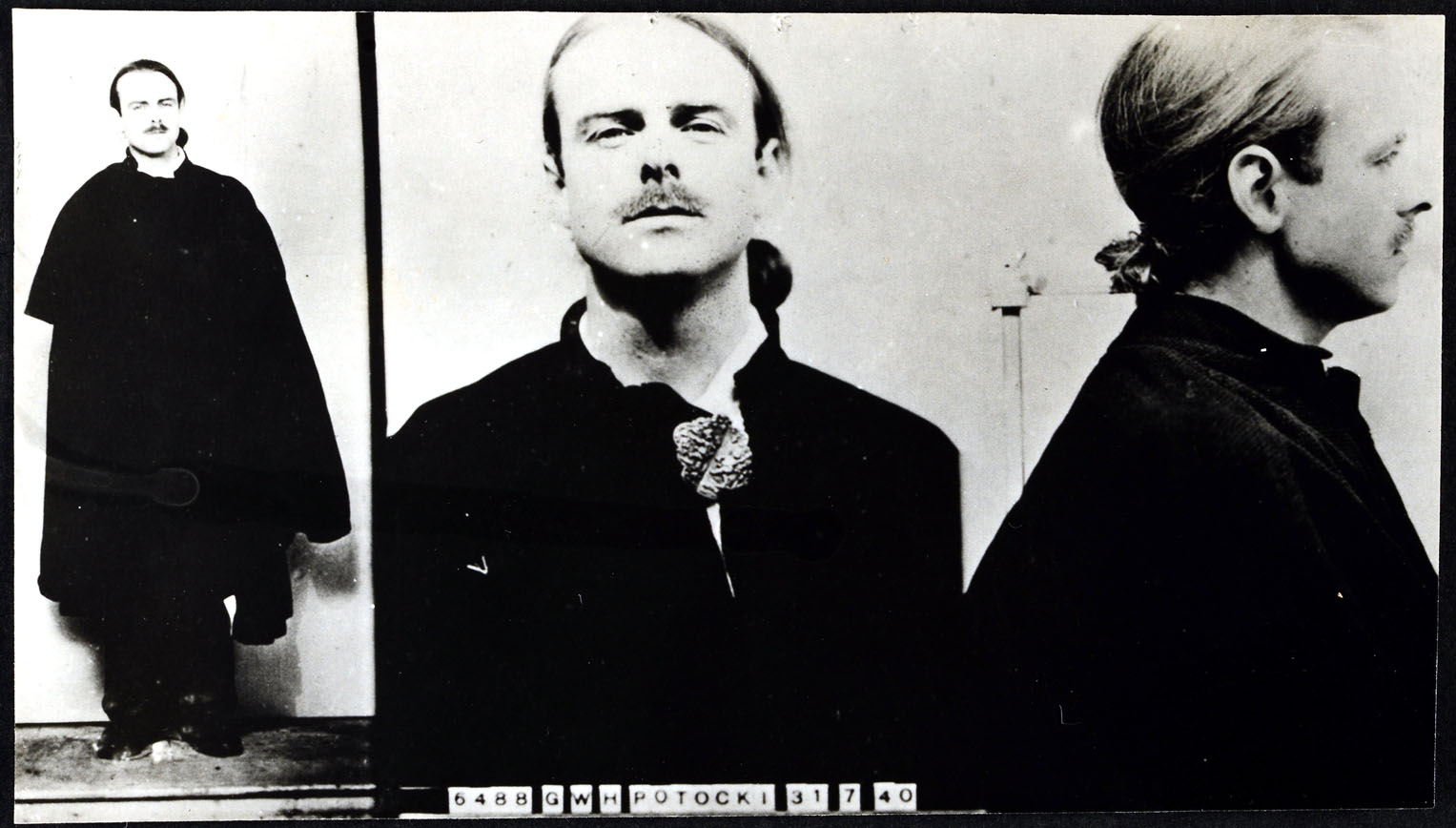
- A police photograph of Count Geoffrey Potocki de Montalk
- Born: Geoffrey Wladyslaw Vaile Potocki de Montalk; 6 October 1903; Remuera, Auckland, New Zealand
- Died: 14 April 1997 (aged 93); Brignoles, Provence, France
- Occupations: Poet, writer
- Writing career
- Period: 20th century
- Notable works: Lament for Sir John Penis; Katyn Manifesto

Count Geoffrey Wladislas Vaile Potocki de Montalk (10 June 1903 – 14 April 1997) was a poet, polemicist, and pretender to the Polish throne.

== Life ==
Potocki was born in New Zealand, the eldest son of Auckland architect Robert Wladislas (Potocki) de Montalk, grandson of Paris-born Joseph Wladislas Edmond Potocki de Montalk, and great-grandson of Polish-born Count Jozef Franciszek Jan Potocki, the Insurgent, of Białystok.

In 1926, de Montalk left his wife and small daughter in New Zealand to be a poet by "follow(ing) the golden road to Samarkand". He travelled to England but moved in 1949 to Draguignan in the south of France where he obtained land and a ramshackle stone cottage – the Villa Vigoni – deep in the Provençal countryside. He did not return to New Zealand until 1983. Between 1984 and 1993, he followed the sun by spending summers in either New Zealand or France. He died at Brignoles in France in 1997 and was buried at Draguignan.

== Career ==
=== Legal troubles ===
Geoffrey Potocki de Montalk was one of a group of New Zealand poets which included his friends A. R. D. Fairburn and R. A. K. Mason. However, his proposed career as a romantic poet was severely affected by a court case in 1932. He was arrested after attempting to publish a manuscript of erotic translations of works by Rabelais and Verlaine, with three short bawdy verses of his own. Though the manuscript had not actually been published, it had been shown to a printer at the Methodist Recorder in London who reported de Montalk to the police on the grounds of obscenity. The subsequent charge was "obscene libel", specifically in relation to the work "Lament for Sir John Penis".

On 8 February 1932, he appeared before Sir Ernest Wild, Recorder of London at the Central Criminal Court and after a celebrated trial – at which he was supported by Leonard and Virginia Woolf and many of the leading writers of the day – he was sentenced to six months in Wormwood Scrubs. He later said that when it was asked who had been libelled, the answer given by the prosecution was "Sir John Penis"!

He emerged from prison bitter and determined to flout English convention. He adopted a mock-medieval style of dress, wearing sandals and a crimson tunic, and a cloak made from a length of scarlet curtain he had begun wearing soon after arrival in London and had worn during his trial. His hair, which had been allowed to grow in prison, continued to grow until it was waist length. After his release he travelled to Warsaw, where he was well received and reported on by that nation's newspapers.

=== Politics, the Right Review and the Katyn Manifesto ===
He returned to England in 1935, to cover the Silver Jubilee of George V, who died shortly thereafter. When Edward VIII declared his intention to marry American divorcee Wallis Simpson, against the wishes of Prime Minister Stanley Baldwin, and was forced to abdicate, Potocki de Montalk printed a manifesto supporting the King and chastising Baldwin, distributing copies in Downing Street and was arrested. Aldous Huxley sent his wife to arrange bail and later funded the purchase of Potocki's first printing press. Potocki married for the second time in 1939.

From 1936 onwards, Potocki produced his extreme right-wing literary publication, the Right Review (1936–73). The Right Review was intended as a response to the Left Review. The first issue of The Right Review, in October carried a statement of Potocki's own monarchist position:

It is our aim to show that the Divine Right of Kings is the sanest and best form of government, being in the last resort the only fount of power and consequently of human life. We intend to prove that such government is intensely beneficial to the whole human race including the lowest races of mankind. In this way we hope to provide the Right Wing with a living ideology.

The publication was noted for its strong support of the Spanish Nationalists; it attacked T. S. Eliot for not expressing support for the Nationalists. The Right Review also published poetry by Roy Campbell and D. S. Savage.

Over the next four decades, Potocki published his own poetry and pamphlets. In 1943, informed by Poles living in London about the Katyn massacre of 15,000 Polish servicemen by Britain's ally, the Soviet Union, Potocki published what he considered to be his most important piece of writing, his Katyn Manifesto.

The British government had been keen to keep the atrocity quiet, which the Soviet Union blamed on Nazi Germany. Potocki was arrested by Special Branch and imprisoned. Later, he was sent to an agricultural camp in Northumberland. This manifesto was the only acknowledgement of the atrocity in English. The full truth of the Katyn massacre was not to emerge for another 50 years. His arrest and conviction was reported as related to the blackout regulations as he was showing a light, and he was reported as saying in court Heil Hitler. In 1945, Potocki criticized the Nuremberg Trials describing them as 'a revolting travesty of justice'.

== Legacy ==
In 2001, his cousin Stephanie de Montalk wrote a biography of this enigmatic and colourful figure. His Right Review is currently archived in the Alexander Turnbull Library at the National Library of New Zealand, which also holds all his 105 original works.

== Works ==
=== Verse ===
- Surprising Songs: An Odyssean Tale in Poetry (London: Columbia Press, 1930).
- Lordly Lovesongs (London: Columbia Press, 1931).
- Prison Poems (London: Montalk Press, 1933).

=== Prose ===
- Text of a Resolution Submitted to the General Assembly of the New European Order by the Polish Delegate (Count Potocki of Montalk) (Melissa Press, 1970).
- Recollections of My Fellow Poets (Auckland: Prometheus Press, 1983).
