= Harry Atkinson (socialist) =

New Zealand engineer, socialist and insurance agent

Harry Albert Atkinson (15 October 1867 – 21 January 1956) was a New Zealand engineer, socialist and insurance agent. He was born in Urenui, Taranaki, New Zealand on 15 October 1867, and was educated at Nelson College.
