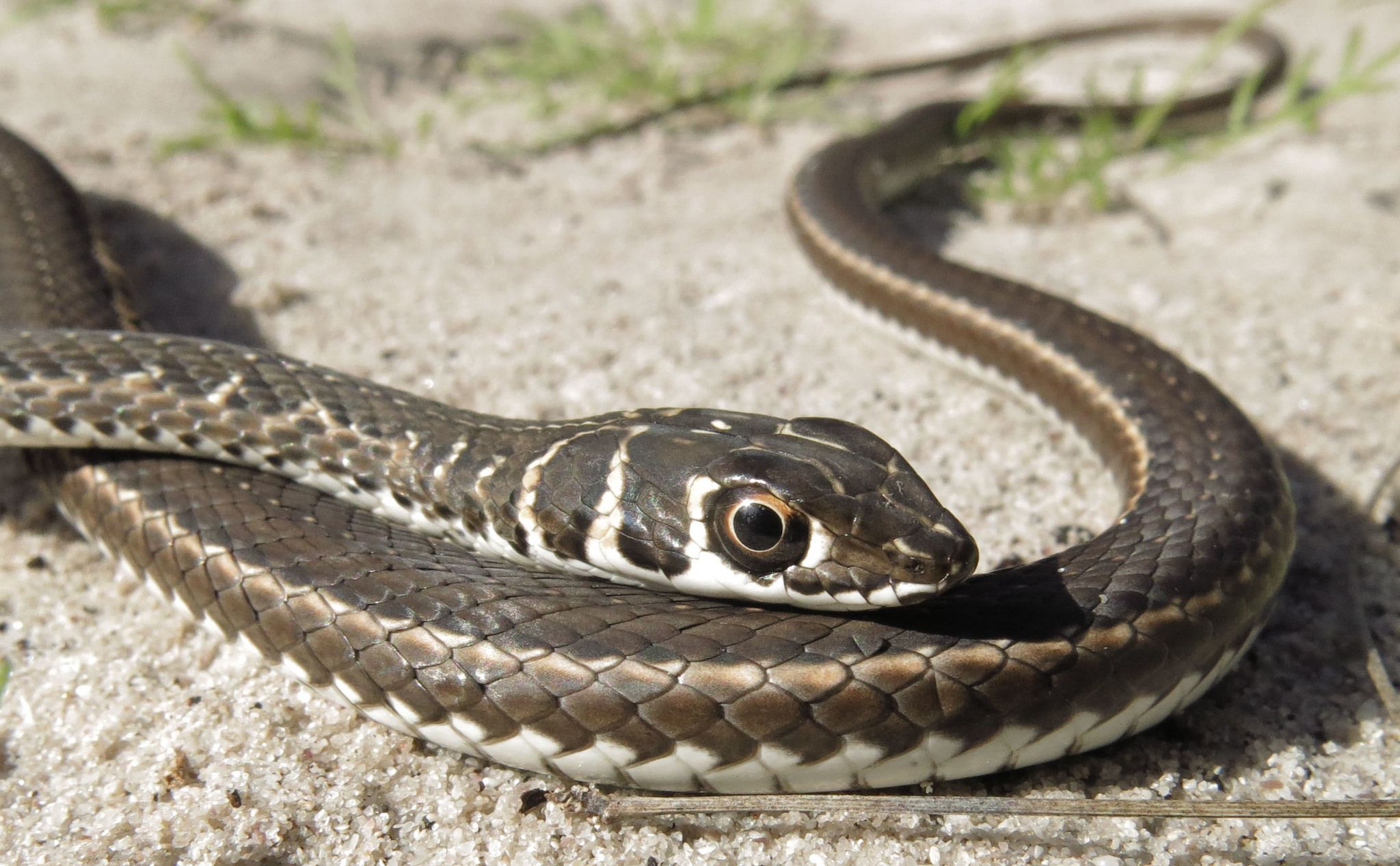

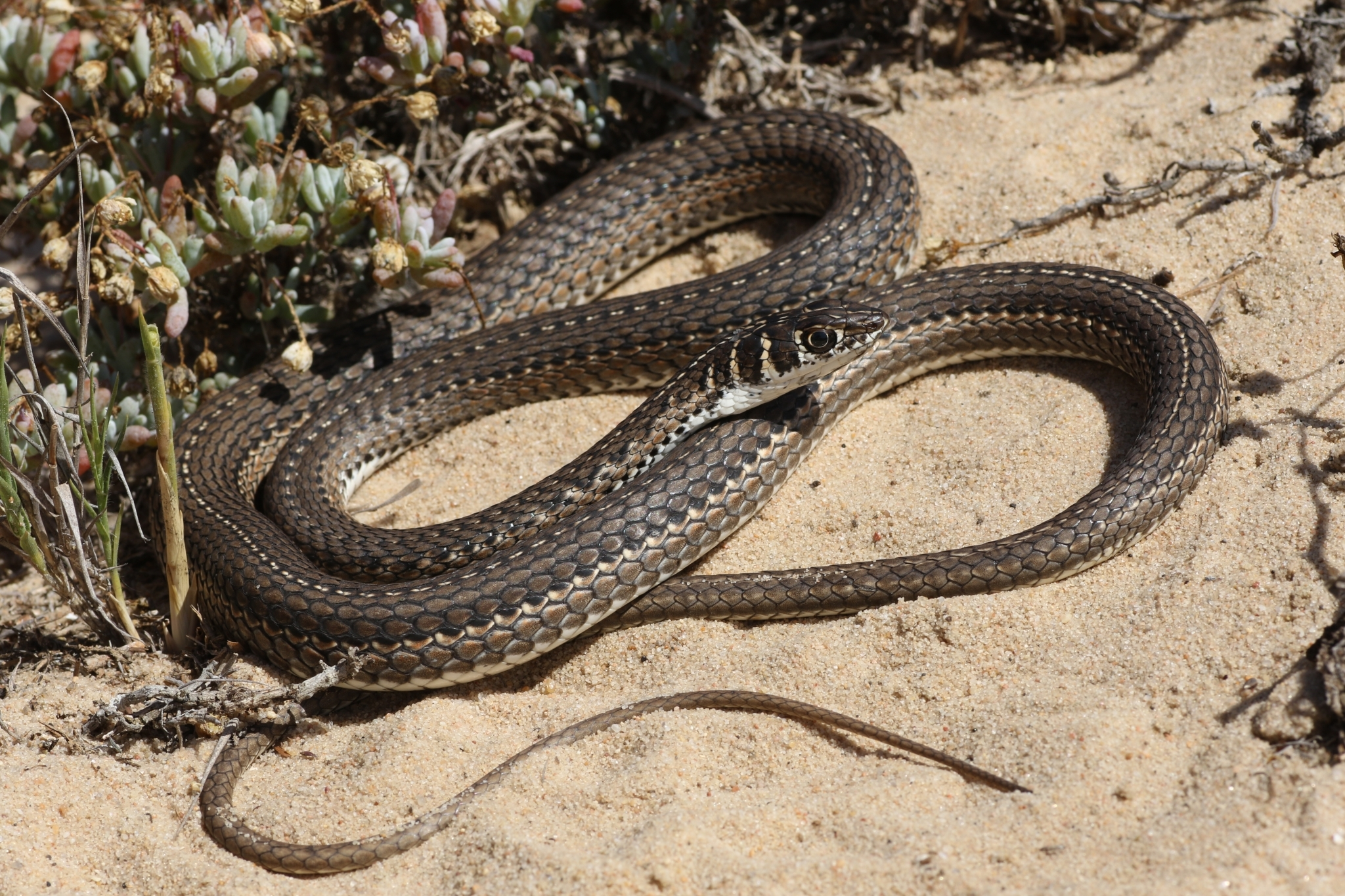

Conservation status
- Least Concern (IUCN 3.1)

Scientific classification
- Kingdom: Animalia
- Phylum: Chordata
- Class: Reptilia
- Order: Squamata
- Suborder: Serpentes
- Family: Psammophiidae
- Genus: Psammophis
- Species: P. leightoni

Binomial name
- Psammophis leightoni Boulenger, 1902

= Psammophis leightoni =

Species of snake

Psammophis leightoni, also called commonly the Cape sand racer, Cape sand snake, fork-marked sand snake, and Namib sand snake, is a species of mildly venomous snake in the family Psammophiidae. The species is native to the western part of southern Africa.

== Etymology ==
The specific name, leightoni, is in honor of British herpetologist Gerald Rowley Leighton.

== Description ==
P. leightoni is a slender snake. It has eight upper labials, the fourth and fifth of which contact the eye. The smooth dorsal scales are arranged in 17 rows at midbody. Males grow to be longer than females. Maximum recorded snout-to-vent lengths (SVL) are 96 cm (38 in) for a male, and 80 cm (31 in) for a female.

== Habitat and geographic range ==
P. leightoni is found in fynbos, veld, and the Karoo, Kalahari and Namib desert biomes of South Africa, Botswana and Namibia, and in a small section of coastal southern Angola.

== Diet ==
P. leightoni preys predominately upon small lizards and small rodents, but will also eat other snakes.

== Reproduction ==
P. leightoni is oviparous. Clutch size is about eight eggs, and each hatchling has a total length (including tail) of 22–24 cm (8.7–9.4 in).

== Taxonomy ==
The former species P. namibensis and P. trinasalis have been moved to P. leightoni as junior synonyms.
