= Bronson Beri =

New Zealand basketball player (born 1989)

Personal information
- Born: 26 June 1989 (age 37) Christchurch, New Zealand
- Listed height: 204 cm (6 ft 8 in)

Career information
- High school: Roncalli College (Timaru, New Zealand); Nelson College (Nelson, New Zealand)
- Playing career: 2007–2021
- Position: Forward

Career history
- 2007–2012; 2014–2019; 2021: Nelson Giants

Career highlights
- NBL champion (2007)

Bronson Beri (born 26 June 1989) is a New Zealand former basketball player.

== Early life ==
Beri was born in Christchurch, New Zealand. He first attended Roncalli College in Timaru before moving to Nelson to attend Nelson College.

== NBL career ==
Beri made his debut for the Nelson Giants in the National Basketball League (NBL) in 2007 as a 17-year-old. He was a member of the Giants' championship-winning team that year.

In 2012, after six seasons waiting for his time, Beri was having a career-best game with the Giants on 14 April against the Manawatu Jets in Palmerston North. He had four 3-pointers in 18 minutes when late in the third quarter, he jumped to block a shot and his left leg folded under him when he landed. He subsequently damaged his anterior cruciate ligament, medial collateral ligament and patellar tendon, and was sidelined for over a year. He returned to the Giants in 2014. In 2019, he was one of the most experienced campaigners in the squad. After missing the 2020 NBL Showdown in Auckland due to work commitments, Beri returned to the Giants in 2021. He suffered a season-ending Achilles injury in June 2021.

== Personal life ==
Beri is a professional barber. As of 2021, he worked at Chop City Barbers in Nelson.

In 2009, Beri was on a scholarship programme with Nelson Marlborough Institute of Technology, where he studied for a diploma in applied fitness.
