= Deborah Geels =

New Zealand diplomat

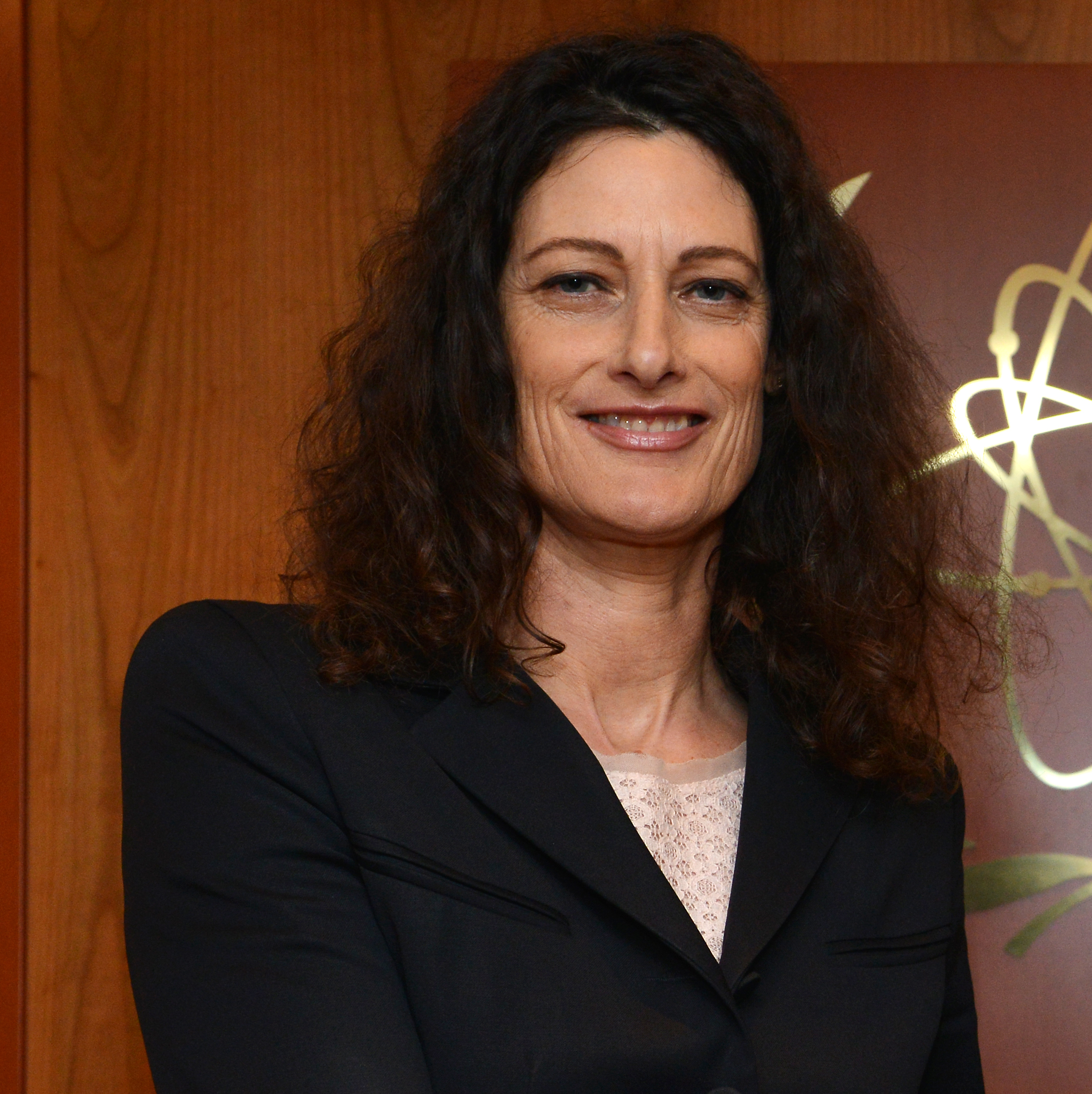
Deborah Geels at the IAEA headquarters in Vienna, Austria, February 2014

Deborah Geels is a New Zealand diplomat. In 2024, she was appointed Permanent Representative to the United Nations in Geneva.

== Early life and education ==
Geels was born in Timaru and attended Sacred Heart Primary School and Roncalli College. She then moved to Christchurch to study international politics and economics at the University of Canterbury.

== Career ==
In 1986, Geels joined the Ministry of Foreign Affairs and Trade to work on New Zealand's aid programme, and later moved into diplomatic roles. From 1993 to 1995, she was posted to Vanuatu, and from 1997 to 2002 she served as the New Zealand Permanent Representative to the United Nations in Geneva. From 2006 to 2008 Geels was Deputy Head of Mission to Beijing, China.

From 2009 to 2012, Geels directed the Ministry's consular division. In 2013, she was appointed Ambassador to Austria, Hungary, Slovakia and Slovenia, and Permanent Representative to the United Nations and Other International Organisations in Vienna. Returning to Wellington at the end of her term in 2017, Geels held deputy secretary roles at the Ministry. In 2024, she was appointed New Zealand Permanent Representative to the United Nations in Geneva.
