= Gareth Dawson =

New Zealand basketball player

Personal information
- Born: 21 February 1989 (age 37) Timaru, New Zealand
- Listed height: 205 cm (6 ft 9 in)

Career information
- High school: Roncalli College (Timaru, New Zealand); Waitaki Boys' (Oamaru, New Zealand)
- Playing career: 2009–present
- Position: Centre / power forward

Career history
- 2009: Manawatu Jets
- 2009–2010: Wollongong Hawks
- 2010–2011: Southland Sharks
- 2010–2011: Cairns Taipans
- 2012: Nelson Giants
- 2013–2014: Southland Sharks
- 2015–2016: Canterbury Rams
- 2016: Mackay Meteors
- 2017: Canterbury Rams

Career highlights
- NZNBL champion (2013)

Gareth Kyle Dawson (born 21 February 1989) is a New Zealand professional basketball player.

== High school ==
Dawson attended Roncalli College from 2004 to 2005, and Waitaki Boys' High School from 2006 to 2007.

== Basketball career ==
In 2008, Dawson played for the North Otago Penguins of the Conference Basketball League (CBL). In 2009, he played for the Manawatu Jets of the National Basketball League (NBL). Dawson spent two seasons in the Australian NBL as a development player with the Wollongong Hawks (2009/10) and Cairns Taipans (2010/11).

In 2010, Dawson played for the Southland Sharks and Southland Flyers.

Dawson continued on with the Sharks in 2011 before joining the Nelson Giants in 2012.

Dawson returned to the Southland Sharks in 2013 and continued on with them in 2014. In May 2014, the Sharks were forced to stand down Dawson after he tested positive for a banned drug. Originally facing a two-year suspension, the Sports Tribunal were lenient after being satisfied he hadn't intentionally cheated and found his taking of prohibited substance tamoxifen was not for performance-enhancing purposes. He was instead suspended from playing for just 12 months in August 2014.

After serving his ban, Dawson joined the Canterbury Rams in April 2015. He continued on with the Rams in 2016. On 10 June 2016, Dawson signed with the Mackay Meteors for the rest of the 2016 Queensland Basketball League season. In five games for the Meteors, he averaged 9.4 points, 9.4 rebounds and 1.6 assists per game.

In March 2017, Dawson re-signed with the Canterbury Rams for the 2017 season.

On 18 December 2017, Dawson was banned for four years for his second anti-doping rule breach since 2014. He was suspended for the presence of a prohibited substance, higenamine, in a sample taken from him at a National Basketball League (NBL) game on May 27. The four-year period of disqualification was backdated to 31 July 2017 with Dawson banned from all organised sport until 30 July 2021.
