= Stephanie de Montalk =

New Zealand poet

- Born: 1945 (age 80–81); New Zealand
- Education: Wellington Hospital, Victoria University of Wellington
- Occupation: Poet
- Writing career
- Language: English
- Genre: Poetry
- Notable awards: NZSA Jessie Mackay Best First Book for Poetry; Nigel Cox Award
- Website: www.stephaniedemontalk.co.nz

Stephanie de Montalk (born 1945) is a poet and biographer from New Zealand.

== Background ==
Born in 1945, in New Zealand, de Montalk grew up in the Far North and Wellington. She trained at Wellington Hospital School of Nursing and received and MA and PhD in Creative Writing from Victoria University of Wellington. She has worked as a nurse, documentary filmmaker, and from 1996–2002 member of the New Zealand Film and Literature Board of Review.

== Works ==
Published works by de Montalk include:

- Five Poems (1989, chapbook), poetry
- Animals Indoors (2000, Victoria University Press), poetry
- The Scientific Evidence of Dr Wang (2002, Victoria University Press), poetry
- Cover Stories (2005, Victoria University Press), poetry
- The Fountain of Tears (2006, Victoria University Press), historical novel
- Vivid Familiar (2009, Victoria University Press), poetry

de Montalk has also published in various literary journals including Landfall, Southerly, London Magazine, and New Zealand Listener. Her poems have also been published in the 2005 the Best New Zealand Poems series.

In 2001, she published a biography of her second-cousin Geoffrey Potocki de Montalk entitled, Unquiet World: The Life of Count Geoffrey Potocki de Montalk.

Following an accident in 2003, de Montalk's writing has often explored concepts of isolation and exile. In her 2014 creative nonfiction work, How Does It Hurt? she explores ideas around chronic pain, both her own and the experiences of other writers.

In 2007, an engraving of her poem, Violinist at the Edge of an Ice Field was erected at the Franz Josef Glacier visitor centre.

== Awards ==
In 1997, while studying at the Victoria University of Wellington de Montalk was a joint winner of the Original Composition prize. Also in 1997, her short story 'The Waiting' was a joint winner of the Novice Writers' Award in the Bank of New Zealand Katherine Mansfield Short Story Awards.

In 2001 her collection Animals Indoors won the NZSA Jessie Mackay Best First Book for Poetry at the Montana New Zealand Book Awards.

In 2006 she was the Victoria University of Wellington Writer in Residence.

How Does It Hurt? won the Nigel Cox Award from Unity Books in 2015.
