= Gerald R. Leighton =

Prof Gerald Rowley Leighton FRSE OBE (12 December 1868 – 8 September 1953) was a British physician, zoologist and specialist in reptiles. He founded the magazine Field Naturalists Quarterly in 1902.

== Life ==
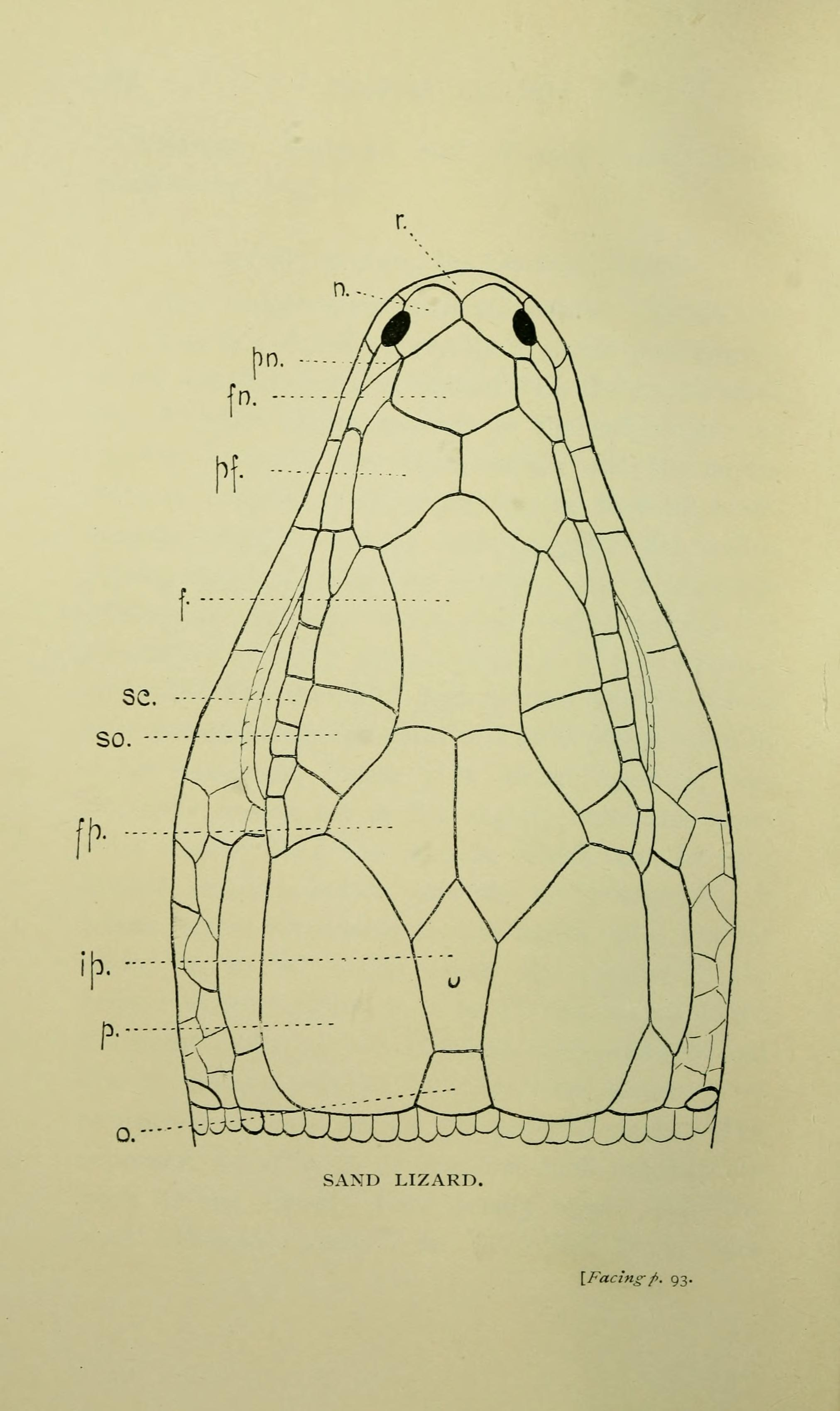
Illustration from The Life History of British Lizards

Leighton was born on 12 December 1868 in Bispham a suburb of Blackpool, the son of Rev James Leighton of Hereford. He was educated at Nelson College in New Zealand and Manchester Grammar School. He then studied medicine at Edinburgh University, graduating with a Triple Qualification 1895. He decided to specialise in animal health.

In 1901 he received his doctorate (MD). That same year he was lecturing at the Dick Vet College and living at 17 Hartington Place in Edinburgh. The college later made him professor of comparative pathology and bacteriology. Edinburgh Corporation appointed him inspector of abattoires and dairies.

In 1903 he was elected a Fellow of the Royal Society of Edinburgh. His proposers were James Cossar Ewart, Sir William Turner, Ramsay Heatley Traquair, and George Alexander Gibson. Syracuse University in New York awarded him an honorary doctorate (DSc).

In the First World War he served as a lieutenant colonel in the Royal Army Service Corps.

He died on the Isle of Man on 8 September 1953.

== Publications ==
- The Life History of British Serpents (1901)
- The Life History of British Lizards (1903)
- The Meat Industry and Meat Inspection (1910)
- Embryology: The Beginnings of Life (1912)
- A Handbook to Meat Inspection (1927)
- The Life of James Leighton, Missionary and Clergyman

== Family ==
Leighton was married to Clara Gordon.

== Legacy ==
Leighton is commemorated in the scientific name of a species of snake, Psammophis leightoni.
