= Matthew Toynbee =

New Zealand cricketer (born 1956)

Personal information
- Full name: Matthew Hall Toynbee
- Born: 26 November 1956 (age 69); Nelson, New Zealand
- Batting: Right-handed
- Bowling: Right-arm offbreak
- Role: All-rounder

Domestic team information
- Years: Team
- 1977/78–1984/85: Central Districts
- FC debut: 16 December 1977 Central Districts v Wellington
- Last FC: 1 March 1985 Central Districts v Auckland
- LA debut: 25 November 1979 Central Districts v Northern Districts
- Last LA: 24 February 1985 Central Districts v Wellington

Career statistics
Competition	First-class	List A
Matches	56	20
Runs scored	1,943	143
Batting average	24.59	10.21
100s/50s	1/7	0/0
Top score	100	27
Balls bowled	5,349	498
Wickets	77	3
Bowling average	30.31	108.33
5 wickets in innings	1	0
10 wickets in match	0	0
Best bowling	6/39	1/23
Catches/stumpings	39/–	5/–
- Source: CricketArchive, 23 February 2009

Matthew Hall Toynbee (born 29 November 1956) is a former New Zealand first-class cricketer for Central Districts.

Born in Nelson, Toynbee attended Nelson College from 1970 to 1974. He was a member of the school's 1st XI cricket team for four years, including two years as captain in 1973 and 1974. He was Head Prefect in 1974 and was the college Fives champion in 1973 and 1974. He later taught at Nelson College between 1979 and 1981.

Toynbee was a right-handed all-rounder who bowled offbreak deliveries which took 77 wickets to complement the 1943 runs he made at 24.59 in 56 first-class matches between 1977 and 1985, including one century. He also played one day cricket between 1979 and 1985, however in this he was much less successful, with only 143 runs at 10.21 and three wickets at 108.33.
