= Roncalli College =

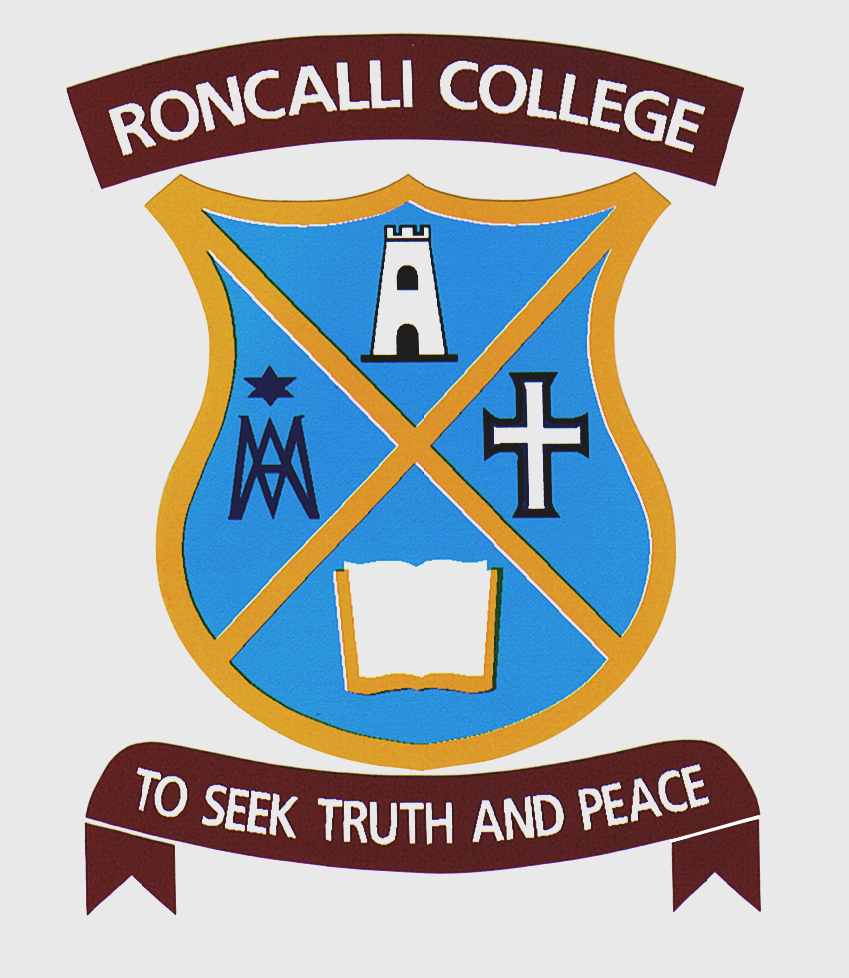

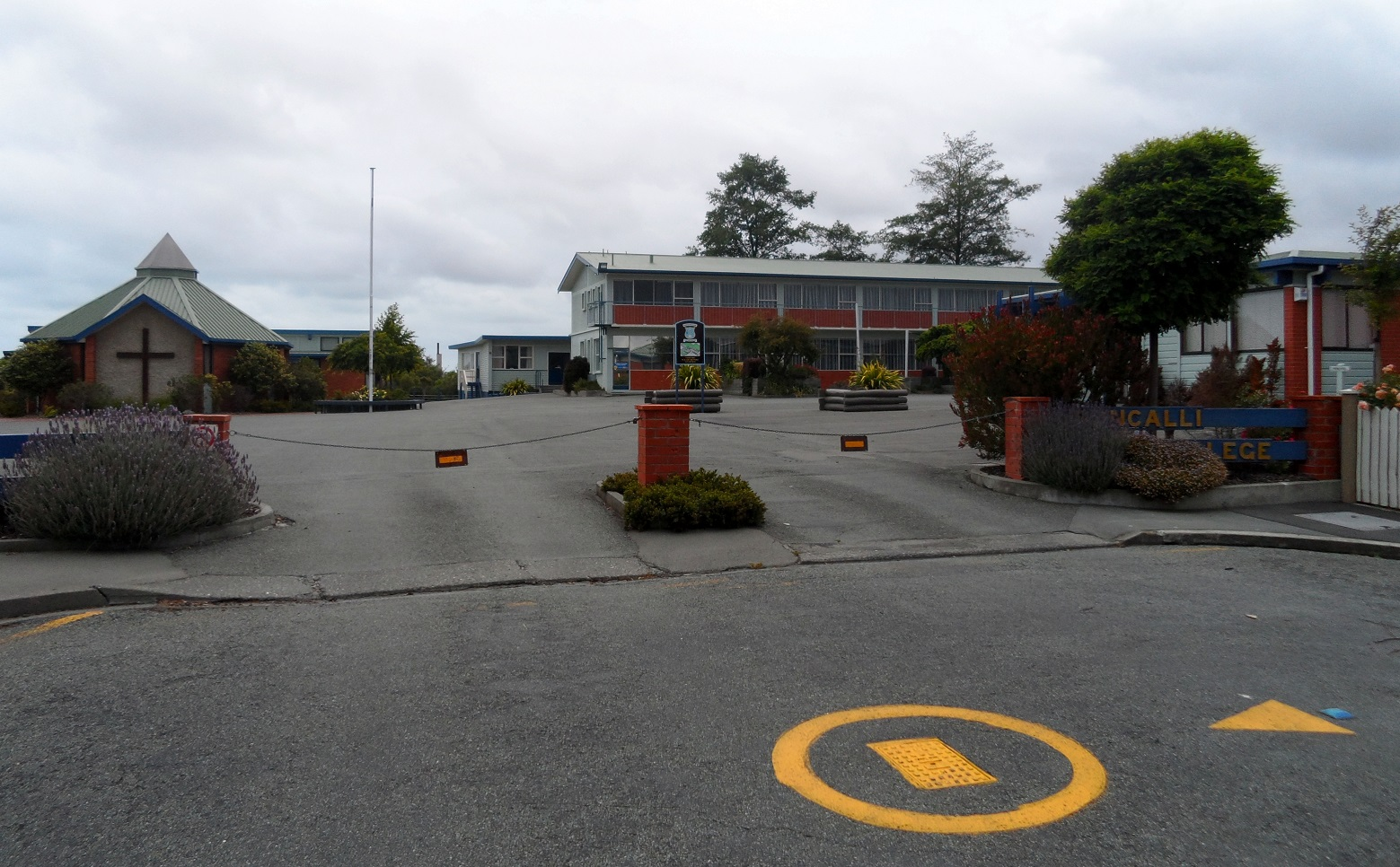

Location
- Timaru, New Zealand; 44.4028°S 171.2463°E

Information
- Type: Co-educational, Secondary (Year 9-13)
- Motto: To Seek Truth and Peace
- Established: 1982; 44 years ago
- Ministry of Education Institution no.: 358
- Principal: Chris Comeau
- Enrolment: 517 (July 2026)
- Socio-economic decile: 7O
- Website: roncalli.school.nz

Roncalli College is a Catholic secondary school in Timaru, New Zealand. It was named after Pope John XXIII, whose birth name was Angelo Giuseppe Roncalli. A co-educational school with about 500 students from Year 9 to Year 13, it stands on Craigie Avenue, next to the Sacred Heart Basilica. It is set on 3.12 hectares (7.7 acres) of land, with 13 free-standing buildings.

It practices NCEA examinations for its senior students. In 2005, 87.7% of Roncalli students achieved NCEA Level 1, 70.3% achieved Level 2, 71.2% achieved Level 3, and 66.7% achieved university entrance.

Sports played include netball, rugby, basketball, rowing, mountain biking, badminton, volleyball, soccer, tennis, cricket, and hockey. Cultural activities include occasional hakas and church services.

The school has a large foreign student population, coming from Europe, South America, Asia, and the Pacific Islands.

Roncalli College was awarded the 2006 Education Outdoors New Zealand (EONZ) Program Award by EONZ for its years 10, 12, and 13 outdoor education programs.

== History ==
Roncalli College was created by merging St. Patrick's High School and Mercy College in 1981. Roncalli is now on the site, and most of the buildings are remnants from the days of the single-sex schools. St. Patrick's was the local high school for Catholic boys, run by the Marist order, and Mercy College was the local Catholic school for girls, run by the Mercy sisters, from their convent, which was situated on what is now the rugby field, also known as the Thunder Dome.

The schools were separated by the "Iron Curtain" or "Brown Curtain", a corrugated iron fence that ran the length of the boundary between the two schools, which kept the boys and girls separated. The penalties for being on the wrong side of the fence were rather severe; any boy caught on the wrong side of the fence without a valid reason was invariably caned.

In the last days of St. Pats and Mercy, the pupils from St. Pats were instructed by the rector to tear down the fence as a prelude to amalgamation. The event was photographed and featured in the Timaru Herald newspaper.

In October 2007, Roncalli College celebrated its 25th Jubilee.

== Enrolment ==
As of July 2026, the school has a roll of 517 students, of which 80 (15.5%) identify as Māori.

As of 2026, the school has an Equity Index of 446, placing it amongst schools whose students have below average socioeconomic barriers to achievement (roughly equivalent to deciles 5 and 6 under the former socio-economic decile system).

== Notable alumni ==
- Bronson Beri – basketball player
- Gareth Dawson – basketball player
- Deborah Geels – diplomat
