= Abbey of St Paul, Verdun =

Former monastery in Verdun, France

Coordinates: 49.1631°N 5.3839°E

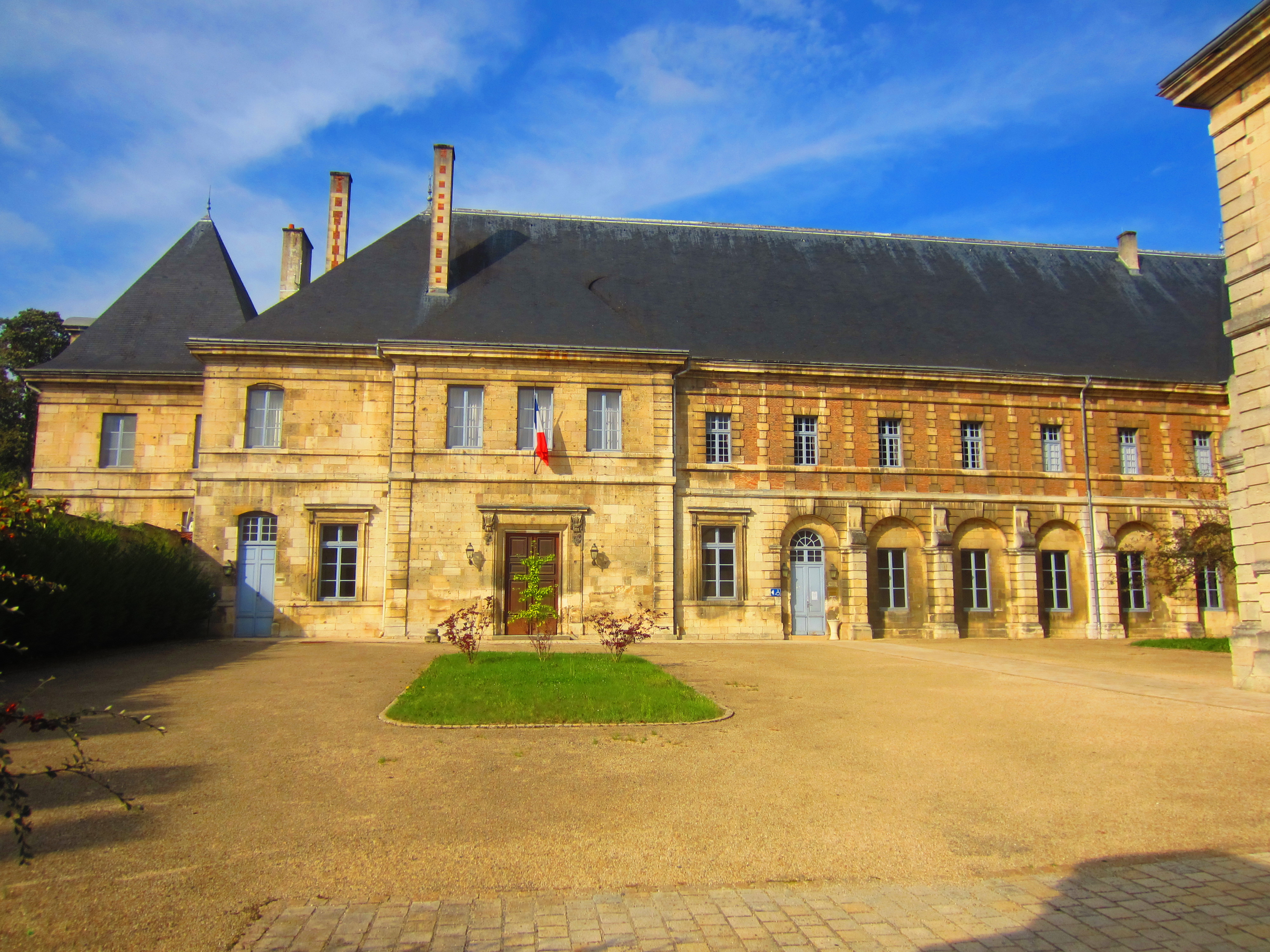
The abbey buildings

The Abbey of St Paul, Verdun (French: L'abbaye Saint-Paul de Verdun), is a former Premonstratensian monastery in Verdun, department of Meuse, Grand Est region, France. The surviving buildings are used for civic purposes.

The abbey was founded in 973 by Benedictine monks. In 1135 it passed to the Premonstratensians, then not long established. The abbey was destroyed and rebuilt several times, most recently in the 17th century. In 1790, during the French Revolution, a new church was being built. Both that and the existing 17th-century church were destroyed. The 17th-century conventual buildings survived, and now accommodate the palais de justice of Verdun and the offices of the sous-préfecture of the Meuse.

The former abbey was noted as a monument historique on 2 December 1926 and part of the interiors on 23 November 1946.
