= Rouvres-en-Woëvre =

- Commune
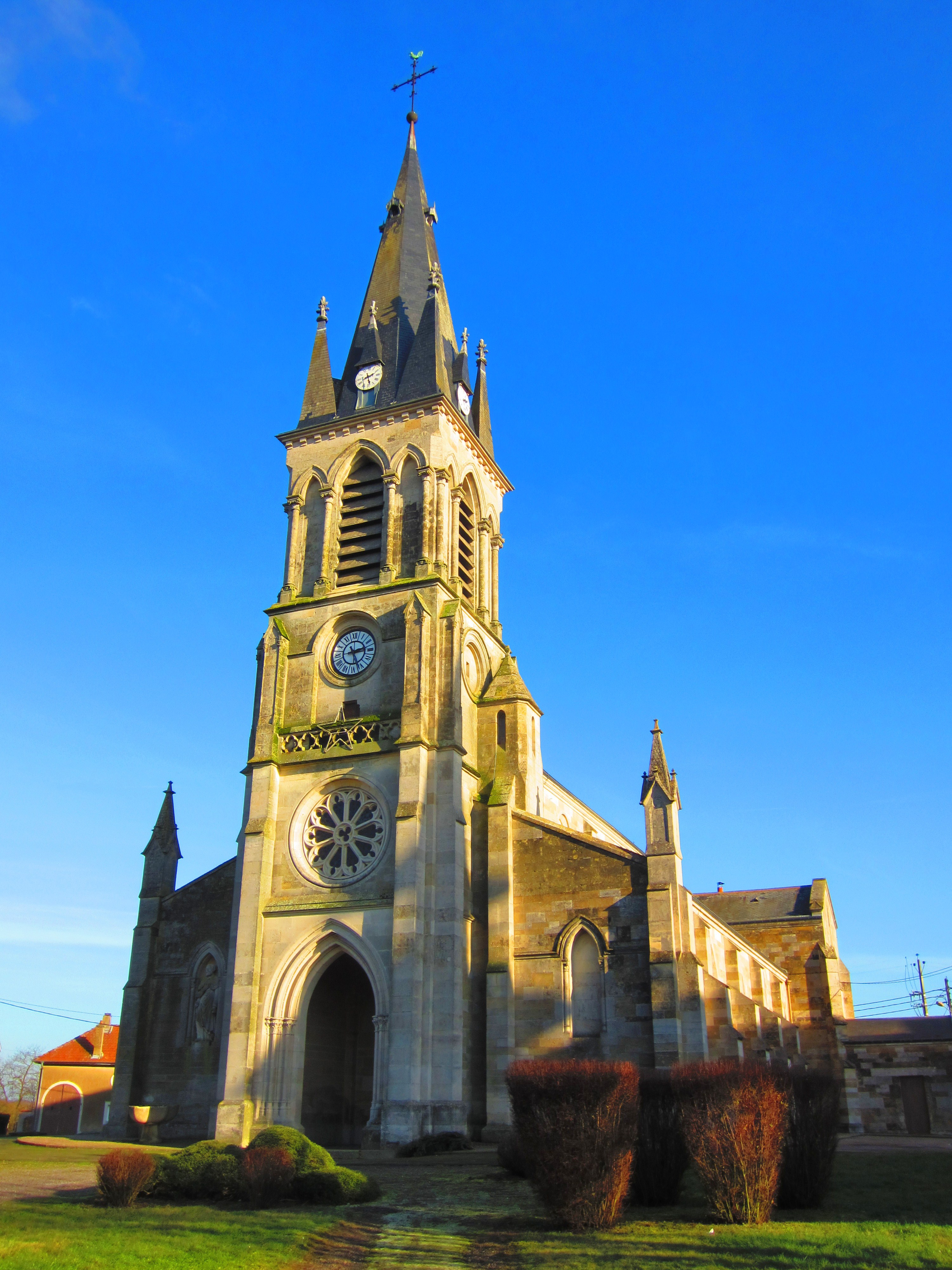
- The church in Rouvres-en-Woëvre
- Location of Rouvres-en-Woëvre
- Location within France Location within Grand Est
- Coordinates: 49°13′11″N 5°41′25″E
- Country: France
- Region: Grand Est
- Department: Meuse
- Arrondissement: Verdun
- Canton: Bouligny
- Intercommunality: CC du pays d'Étain

Government
  - Mayor (2020–2026): Pierre-Marie Meyer
- Area^{1}: 16.74 km^{2} (6.46 sq mi)
- Elevation: 227 m (745 ft)
- Highest elevation: 259 m (850 ft)
- Lowest elevation: 203 m (666 ft)
- Population (2023): 598
  - Density: 35.7/km^{2} (92.5/sq mi)
- Time zone: UTC+01:00 (CET)
  - Summer (DST): UTC+02:00 (CEST)
- INSEE/Postal code: 55443 /55400
- ^{1} French Land Register data, which excludes lakes, ponds, glaciers > 1 km^{2} (0.386 sq mi or 247 acres) and river estuaries.

Rouvres-en-Woëvre (French pronunciation: [ʁuv ɑ̃ wavʁ]) is a commune in the Meuse department in Grand Est in northeastern France.

== See also ==
- Etain-Rouvres Air Base
- Communes of the Meuse department
- Moulin de Rouvres
