= Joseph Wladislas Edmond Potocki de Montalk =

New Zealand language teacher and storekeeper

Joseph Wladislas Edmond Potocki de Montalk (14 February 1836 – 6 September 1901) was a New Zealand language teacher and storekeeper. He was born in Paris, France on 14 February 1836.
