= Tom Vodanovich =

New Zealand basketball player (born 1994)

No. 32 – Auckland Tuatara
- Position: Power forward
- League: NZNBL

Personal information
- Born: 28 July 1994 (age 32) Wellington, New Zealand
- Listed height: 201 cm (6 ft 7 in)
- Listed weight: 104 kg (229 lb)

Career information
- High school: St Patrick's College (Wellington, New Zealand)
- College: James Madison (2013–2017)
- NBA draft: 2017: undrafted
- Playing career: 2012–present

Career history
- 2012: Wellington Saints
- 2018–2019: Southland Sharks
- 2018–2020: New Zealand Breakers
- 2020: Manawatu Jets
- 2020: BBC Telstar Hesper
- 2021–2022: Sydney Kings
- 2021: Auckland Huskies
- 2022–2023: Wellington Saints
- 2022–2023: New Zealand Breakers
- 2023: Converge FiberXers
- 2024: Tasmania JackJumpers
- 2024–present: Auckland Tuatara
- 2024–2025: South East Melbourne Phoenix

Career highlights
- 2× NBL champion (2022, 2024); NZNBL champion (2018); NZNBL MVP (2020); NZNBL All-Star Five (2020); NZNBL Sixth Man of the Year (2026)

Thomas James Vodanovich (born 28 July 1994) is a New Zealand professional basketball player for the Auckland Tuatara of the New Zealand National Basketball League (NZNBL). He played college basketball in the United States for the James Madison Dukes between 2013 and 2017 before having a two-year stint with the New Zealand Breakers of the Australian National Basketball League (NBL). He joined the Sydney Kings in 2021 and won an NBL championship in 2022. He won a second NBL championship with the Tasmania JackJumpers in 2024. In 2020, he was named the New Zealand NBL MVP playing for the Manawatu Jets.

== Early life ==
Vodanovich was born in Wellington and attended St Patrick's College. In 2012, he made his debut in the New Zealand NBL when he played 37 seconds for the Wellington Saints against the Southland Sharks on 22 March.

In January 2013, Vodanovich moved to the United States to attend prep school at SPIRE Institute in Geneva, Ohio. He played for the basketball programme through to the spring break and averaged 18.5 points, 12 rebounds and two blocks per game.

== College career ==
In April 2013, Vodanovich committed to attending James Madison University in Harrisonburg, Virginia.

As a freshman with the Dukes in 2013–14, Vodanovich averaged 21.1 minutes per game to go with 4.1 points and 4.1 rebounds. He recorded two games of scoring in double-figures and four games of eight or more rebounds. He became the first freshman to lead JMU in points in a season opener since 2008 with 11 against Virginia.

As a sophomore in 2014–15, Vodanovich played 29 games with 21 starts and averaged 22.8 minutes per game to go with 5.4 points and 4.0 rebounds. He reached double-digit scoring five times and grabbed at least six rebounds eight times. He scored a career-high 18 points in win over Drexel on 18 February 2015.

As a junior in 2015–16, Vodanovich started all 31 games he appeared in and averaged career highs of 6.2 points and 4.4 rebounds in 24.7 minutes per game. He scored a season-high 17 points against UNCW on 13 February 2016.

As a senior in 2016–17, Vodanovich played 29 games with 18 starts and averaged 6.2 points, 3.7 rebounds and 1.1 assists in 20.4 minutes per game. He recorded a career-high 13 rebounds in a win against Longwood on 3 December 2016. He went on to match his career high for points with 18 in a loss against Western Michigan a week later.

Vodanovich graduated from James Madison with a degree in Sports and Recreation Management.

== Professional career ==
In December 2017, Vodanovich signed with the Southland Sharks for the 2018 New Zealand NBL season. He helped the Sharks reach the NBL final, where they defeated the Wellington Saints 98–96 to win the championship. In 20 games, he averaged 7.2 points, 4.0 rebounds and 1.7 assists per game.

In August 2018, Vodanovich joined the New Zealand Breakers as a development player for the 2018–19 NBL season. He made one appearance for the Breakers during the season.

Vodanovich returned to the Sharks in 2019 and averaged 12.2 points, 6.0 rebounds and 1.6 assists per game, including recording 23 points and seven rebounds in the Sharks' semi-final loss to the Saints.

In July 2019, Vodanovich signed a one-year deal with the Breakers to join the full-time squad for the 2019–20 NBL season. He appeared in 23 games and averaged 1.9 points and 1.1 assists per game.

Vodanovich was initially set to re-join the Sharks in 2020, but due to the coronavirus pandemic, the planned 2020 season was initially suspended and then modified into a small-scale, quick-fire format. As a result, the Sharks declined to enter the rejigged competition. Vodanovich was subsequently acquired by the Manawatu Jets and went on to claim the New Zealand NBL Most Valuable Player Award as well as All-Star Five honours. He then went on to lead the Jets to the NBL final, where they lost 79–77 to the Otago Nuggets despite Vodanovich's game-high 24 points. In 16 games, he averaged 22.4 points, 10.2 rebounds, 2.1 assists and 1.1 steals per game.

On 18 September 2020, Vodanovich signed with BBC Telstar Hesper of the Total League in Luxembourg. He appeared in three games for Telstar before their season was cut short due to COVID-19.

On 2 January 2021, Vodanovich signed with the Sydney Kings of the Australian NBL as an injury replacement for Xavier Cooks. In 36 games during the 2020–21 season, he averaged 5.0 points and 2.4 rebounds per game. He then joined the Auckland Huskies for the 2021 New Zealand NBL season.

On 27 June 2021, Vodanovich re-signed with the Kings for the 2021–22 NBL season. He helped the Kings win the NBL championship and then joined the Wellington Saints for the 2022 New Zealand NBL season.

On 29 May 2022, Vodanovich signed a two-year deal with the New Zealand Breakers, returning to the franchise for a second stint. He helped the Breakers reach the grand final series in 2022–23. Following the NBL season, he had a one-game stint with Converge FiberXers of the Philippine Basketball Association (PBA) and then re-joined the Wellington Saints for the 2023 New Zealand NBL season.

On 21 June 2023, Vodanovich was released from his contract by the Breakers.

Vodanovich re-joined the Converge FiberXers as the team's import for the 2023–24 PBA Commissioner's Cup. He was released by the team on 5 December 2023 after averaging 20.8 points, 12.4 rebounds, 3.6 assists and 1.2 steals in five games.

On 5 January 2024, Vodanovich signed with the Tasmania JackJumpers for the rest of the 2023–24 NBL season. The JackJumpers went on to reach the grand final series, where they defeated Melbourne United 3–2 to win the championship. Vodanovich missed game five of the series after returning to New Zealand for his wedding.

Vodanovich joined the Auckland Tuatara for the 2024 New Zealand NBL season, returning to the franchise for a second stint. In 15 games, he averaged 19.2 points, 6.9 rebounds and 1.3 assists per game.

On 25 June 2024, Vodanovich signed with the South East Melbourne Phoenix for the 2024–25 NBL season. In 30 games, he averaged 2.7 points and 1.8 rebounds per game.

Vodanovich re-joined the Tuatara for the 2025 New Zealand NBL season. In 22 games, he averaged 13.0 points, 4.7 rebounds and 1.9 assists per game.

Vodanovich re-joined the Tuatara for the 2026 New Zealand NBL season. He was named the inaugural NZNBL Sixth Man of the Year.

== National team career ==
In 2012, Vodanovich played for the Junior Tall Blacks at the FIBA Oceania Under-18 Championship and the Albert Schweitzer Tournament. He made his debut for the Tall Blacks in 2018. He joined the Tall Blacks for qualifiers in February 2024.

== Personal life ==
Vodanovich and his wife Jade have a daughter.
