= Leon Henry =

New Zealand basketball player (born 1985)

Personal information
- Born: 14 October 1985 (age 41) Auckland, New Zealand
- Listed height: 202 cm (6 ft 8 in)
- Listed weight: 105 kg (231 lb)

Career information
- High school: Mount Albert Grammar School (Auckland, New Zealand); Avondale College (Auckland, New Zealand)
- College: College of Southern Idaho (2005–2006)
- Playing career: 2004–present
- Position: Forward

Career history
- 2004: Harbour Heat
- 2008–2011: Wellington Saints
- 2008–2009: U-Mobitelco Cluj-Napoca
- 2010–2013: New Zealand Breakers
- 2012: Otago Nuggets
- 2013–2014: Southland Sharks
- 2014–2016: Townsville Crocodiles
- 2015–2017: Wellington Saints
- 2017: Ballarat Miners
- 2018–2019: Wellington Saints
- 2020: Auckland Huskies
- 2021: Wellington Saints
- 2022: Franklin Bulls
- 2023: Manawatu Jets
- 2023: Knox Raiders
- 2025: Indian Panthers
- 2025: Manawatu Jets

Career highlights
- 3× NBL champion (2011–2013); 7× NZNBL champion (2010, 2011, 2013, 2016, 2017, 2019, 2021); NZNBL Final Four MVP (2013)

Leon Hofeni Nehemiah Henry (born 14 October 1985) is a New Zealand basketball player. He debuted in the New Zealand National Basketball League (NZNBL) in 2004 and has won seven championships. He has also played five seasons in the Australian NBL, where he won three straight championships with the New Zealand Breakers between 2011 and 2013.

== Early life and career ==
Henry was born and raised in Auckland, New Zealand. He attended Mount Albert Grammar School and Avondale College. A rugby league player in his early days, he discovered basketball as a 12-year-old at a holiday camp run by then-Auckland Stars coach Tab Baldwin. Baldwin gave Henry a Tall Blacks trial when he was 18.

Henry debuted in the New Zealand NBL in 2004 with the Harbour Heat. He also played for Hutt Valley in the Conference Basketball League (CBL) in 2004, helping the team reach the final while earning CBL Tournament Team honours.

In 2005, Henry played for Waitakere U23 in the CBL. In 10 games, he averaged 21.8 points, 7.7 rebounds, 2.0 steals and 1.1 blocks per game.

Henry moved to the United States to play college basketball for the College of Southern Idaho (CSI), where he averaged 4.1 points and 3.6 rebounds in 29 games for the CSI Golden Eagles during the 2005–06 season.

In 2006, Henry played for the Waitakere Rangers and helped the team reach the CBL final. In 2007, he played for Porirua in the CBL, but did not play in any of the team's five finals games.

== Professional career ==
Henry made his return to the New Zealand NBL in 2008 when he joined the Wellington Saints. The Saints reached the championship series in 2008, where they lost 2–0 to the Waikato Pistons. Henry played 10 minutes in game one but saw no court time in game two.

In August 2008, Henry moved to Romania to play for U-Mobitelco Cluj-Napoca. He joined former Tall Blacks' head coach and childhood mentor Tab Baldwin at the club. In 27 games during the 2008–09 Romanian League season, Henry averaged 4.4 points and 2.1 rebounds per game.

Upon returning to New Zealand, Henry had a five-game stint with the Wellington Saints to complete the 2009 New Zealand NBL season. He then re-joined the Saints in 2010 and won his first championship, helping the team defeat the Waikato Pistons 2–1 in the finals. Henry had eight points and 11 rebounds in a game one loss; three points and seven rebounds in a game two win; and then seven points and nine rebounds in the title-clinching game three win.

Henry joined the New Zealand Breakers for the first three games of the 2010–11 NBL season as a replacement for Kirk Penney. He lost his spot on the roster when Penney returned from his unsuccessful NBA tilt, but the Breakers had seen enough from Henry to want to keep him around. League rules meant he could return to the roster only if Penney dropped out, so Henry remained with the shadow squad for the rest of what was a championship-winning season.

After helping the Saints win back-to-back titles in 2011, Henry was rewarded with a full-time contract with the Breakers for the 2011–12 NBL season, after Penney's departure to Spain. However, Henry's season debut was delayed until late November due to a stress fracture in his shin. In April 2012, the Breakers defeated the Perth Wildcats 2–1 in the NBL Grand Final series to claim back-to-back championships. In 23 games during the 2011–12 season, Henry averaged 2.8 points and 2.8 rebounds per game.

Following the Breakers' championship win, Henry joined the Otago Nuggets for the final six games of their 2012 New Zealand NBL season.

Henry returned to the Breakers for the 2012–13 NBL season, and in April 2013, he was a member of the team's third straight championship. He appeared in 31 of the Breakers' 32 games, averaging 3.5 points and 2.2 rebounds per game.

In 2013, Henry played for the Southland Sharks and helped them win the New Zealand NBL championship behind his Final Four MVP performance.

Henry returned to the Sharks in 2014 but played in only 10 games before being suspended by the team on 30 May. The suspension came after he and two teammates were charged with "assault with intent to injure" in connection with a fight outside a bar in New Plymouth the previous Sunday.

Henry returned to the Australian NBL for the 2014–15 season after he joined the Townsville Crocodiles. He appeared in all 28 games for the Crocodiles, averaging 5.1 points and 3.2 rebounds per game. After returning to the Wellington Saints for the 2015 New Zealand NBL season, Henry re-joined the Crocodiles for the 2015–16 season. He once again appeared in all 28 games, and in what was his final season in the Australian NBL, he averaged 4.2 points and 3.4 rebounds per game.

With the Saints in 2016, Henry won his fourth New Zealand NBL championship. With the Saints in 2017, he set an NBL record on 17 April against the Canterbury Rams with 10 3-pointers and set a Saints team record with 21 rebounds on 26 May against the Nelson Giants. He went on to help guide the Saints to an unbeaten season in 2017, as well as winning his fifth NBL championship.

Following the 2017 New Zealand NBL season, Henry returned to Australia and played for the Ballarat Miners throughout the rest of the South East Australian Basketball League (SEABL) season. On 31 July 2017, he was named SEABL Player of the Week for round 17.

After another grand final appearance in 2018 that resulted in a loss for Henry and the Saints against the Sharks, Henry returned to Wellington in 2019 for a ninth season. He played his 200th NBL game during the 2019 season and won his sixth NBL championship.

On 13 December 2019, Henry signed with the Franklin Bulls for the 2020 New Zealand NBL season, becoming the franchise's first ever signing. However, following a revised competition format due to the COVID-19 pandemic and a subsequent player draft, Henry was acquired by the Auckland Huskies in June 2020.

In June 2021, Henry came out of retirement to re-join the Wellington Saints for the rest of the 2021 New Zealand NBL season.

On 4 April 2022, Henry signed with the Franklin Bulls for the 2022 New Zealand NBL season, returning to the franchise he was originally set to play for in 2020.

On 8 April 2023, Henry joined the Manawatu Jets of the New Zealand NBL on a short-term contract. He played his only game for the team on 9 April. He later joined the Knox Raiders of the NBL1 South, where he played seven games during the 2023 NBL1 season.

In January 2024, Henry announced his retirement from basketball.

Henry came out of retirement to play for the Indian Panthers during the 2025 New Zealand NBL season. The team withdrew mid-season. On 19 June 2025, he signed with the Manawatu Jets for the rest of the 2025 season, returning to the team for a second stint.

== National team career ==
In 2004, Henry played for the Junior Tall Blacks, helping the team defeat Australia in the final of the Oceania Youth Tournament. He scored 25 points in the final and averaged a team-high 19.0 points per game in the tournament.

Henry earned his first selection to the Tall Blacks squad on 16 July 2009, and participated in the 2009 FIBA Oceania Championship. He went on to represent New Zealand at the 2011 FIBA Oceania Championship and the 2012 FIBA World Olympic Qualifying Tournament.

== Personal life ==
Henry's mother is Samoan-Niuean and his father is from Rarotonga, Cook Islands. Henry and his ex-partner, singer Aaradhna, had an apartment in West Hollywood as of 2014. He is fascinated by tattoos as an artform; his tattoos reflect his cultural heritage and upbringing.
