= Ethan Rusbatch =

New Zealand basketball player (born 1992)

No. 12 – Otago Nuggets
- Position: Shooting guard / small forward
- League: NZNBL

Personal information
- Born: 24 May 1992 (age 34) Timaru, New Zealand
- Listed height: 196 cm (6 ft 5 in)
- Listed weight: 97 kg (214 lb)

Career information
- High school: Cashmere (Christchurch, New Zealand)
- College: Lincoln Trail CC (2010–2011)
- Playing career: 2012–present

Career history
- 2012: Southland Sharks
- 2013: Taranaki Mountainairs
- 2014–2017: Canterbury Rams
- 2016–2017: New Zealand Breakers
- 2018–2019: Hawke's Bay Hawks
- 2019–2020: New Zealand Breakers
- 2021–2023: Hawke's Bay Hawks
- 2023: Converge FiberXers
- 2024–2025: Franklin Bulls
- 2024–2025: Tampereen Pyrintö
- 2026–present: Otago Nuggets

Career highlights
- NZNBL Most Improved Player (2019)
Medals
Representing New Zealand
Men's basketball
Commonwealth Games
Bronze medal – third place	2018 Gold Coast	Team competition

Ethan Stuart Marsters Rusbatch (born 24 May 1992) is a New Zealand basketball player for the Otago Nuggets of the New Zealand National Basketball League (NZNBL). He began his New Zealand NBL career in 2012 with the Southland Sharks after spending one season in the United States playing college basketball for Lincoln Trail College. After playing for the Taranaki Mountainairs in 2013, he spent the next four seasons with the Canterbury Rams. He joined the Hawke's Bay Hawks in 2018 and won the NZNBL's Most Improved Player in 2019. He also played two seasons with the New Zealand Breakers in the Australian NBL.

== Early life ==
Rusbatch was born in Timaru, New Zealand. He originally grew up in Twizel before moving to Wellington, where he received his first basketball opportunities. He began playing basketball at a young age thanks to family influence from his mother, aunt and uncle. His uncle is Kenny Perkins, an American who played in the New Zealand NBL for the Canterbury Rams during the 1980s. Rusbatch grew up idolising his uncle and dreamed of playing for the Rams himself. After living in Wellington for three years, his family moved to Christchurch when he a 10-year-old. He went on to represent Canterbury Basketball in all age groups.

=== Junior and representative career ===
Rusbatch attended Cashmere High School in Christchurch and played for the school's basketball team every year he was there (2005–2009). In 2008, Rusbatch played for the Canterbury under 17 team, made the Under 17 National Championships all-tournament team, and represented New Zealand for the first time with the under 17 squad.

In January 2009, Rusbatch captained the New Zealand under 18 team to a bronze medal at the Australian Youth Olympic Festival. He went on to captain the same squad in Spain at the Vilagarcía Basket Cup in April 2009, a tournament they finished last in. Later that year, he helped the Canterbury under 19 team win the Under 19 National Championships with a 79–69 win over Waitakere City in the final, a game Rusbatch top scored in with 20 points. He subsequently earned all-tournament team honours. He again earned all-tournament team honours for his efforts during the 2010 Under 19 National Championships.

In July 2010, Rusbatch competed in the five-day Conference Basketball League tournament in Porirua for the Junior Tall Blacks. A few months later, he ventured to the United States to attend Lincoln Trail College. There he played for the school's basketball team, the Statesmen, and during the 2010–11 season, he averaged 3.8 points and 2.1 rebounds in 28 games. Upon his return to New Zealand, Rusbatch joined the Canterbury under 21 team for the 2011 Under 21 National Championships. Behind a 17-point effort, he helped Canterbury win the tournament with a 75–65 win over Porirua in the final. He subsequently earned all-tournament team honours and was named tournament MVP. At the 2012 Under 21 National Championships, Rusbatch earned all-tournament team honours for the fifth straight year. In August 2014, he played for Canterbury Metro at the Under 23 National Championships. He subsequently earned all-tournament team honours for a sixth time.

== Professional career ==
=== New Zealand NBL ===
==== Southland Sharks (2012) ====
With high school over and his college stint lasting just one year, a number of NZNBL teams were keen to acquire Rusbatch's services. He joined the Southland Sharks in April 2012, and in four games, he averaged 5.5 points and 2.3 rebounds per game. His best performance came on 10 May against the Auckland Pirates, recording 14 points and six rebounds in a 107–89 loss.

==== Taranaki Mountainairs (2013) ====
In February 2013, Rusbatch signed with the Taranaki Mountainairs for the 2013 New Zealand NBL season. He scored in double figures five times, including a 24-point, 12-rebound performance in the team's season finale on 6 July against the Otago Nuggets, a game the Mountainairs lost 145–137 in quadruple overtime. The Mountainairs missed the playoffs in 2013 with a 5–11 record and a sixth-place finish. Rusbatch appeared in all 16 games for Taranaki, averaging 9.4 points, 4.8 rebounds and 1.7 assists per game.

==== Canterbury Rams (2014–2017) ====
===== 2014 season =====
In 2014, the Canterbury Rams returned to the NZNBL for the first time since 2008. Rusbatch joined the Rams for their return season. On 20 June, he scored a season-high 20 points in a 108–83 loss to the Southland Sharks. In the Rams' season finale on 28 June, Rusbatch had 19 points and 10 rebounds in a 90–87 win over the Sharks. The Rams missed the playoffs in 2014 with a 6–12 record and a ninth-place finish. Rusbatch appeared in all 18 games for Canterbury, averaging 9.7 points, 4.5 rebounds and 1.2 assists per game.

===== 2015 season =====
In December 2014, Rusbatch re-signed with the Rams for the 2015 season. He was subsequently named co-captain of the team alongside Marques Whippy. He had a breakout season for the Rams in 2015, which led to his coach Mark Dickel calling for him to receive a Tall Blacks trial. Granted more of an offensive license by Dickel in 2015, Rusbatch flourished and was dubbed the most improved New Zealand player in the league, along with Manawatu's Brook Ruscoe. Rusbatch twice scored 27 points during the season, a career high. The Rams missed the playoffs in 2015 with a 9–9 record and a fifth-place finish. He appeared in all 18 games for the Rams, averaging 14.9 points, 5.5 rebounds, 1.4 assists and 1.2 steals per game.

Following the 2015 season, Rusbatch gave up his furniture moving job to focus on basketball full time. Over the off-season, he had daily workouts with coach Mark Dickel and put up 1,000 shots per day.

===== 2016 season =====
Rusbatch returned to the Rams for the 2016 season with the goal being to attain an Australian NBL contract. On 28 March, he scored a career-high 30 points on 12-of-24 shooting in a 99–96 overtime win over the Hawke's Bay Hawks. He helped the Rams win the minor premiership with a first-place finish and a 13–5 record, but they went on to lose 104–85 to the fourth-seeded Super City Rangers, with Rusbatch having a season-worst performance of four points on 1-of-16 shooting. He appeared in all 19 games for the Rams, averaging 14.5 points, 4.5 rebounds, 2.0 assists and 1.1 steals per game.

===== 2017 season =====
On 17 October 2016, Rusbatch re-signed with the Rams for the 2017 season. He missed the first two games of the season with a sprained ankle. On 25 April, he scored a season-high 20 points in a 106–89 win over the Hawke's Bay Hawks. On 3 June, he matched his season high with 20 points against the Taranaki Mountainairs. The Rams finished the regular season in fourth place with a 10–8 record, and lost in the semi-finals to the Wellington Saints. In 17 games, Rusbatch averaged 12.3 points, 4.2 rebounds, 1.9 assists and 1.0 steals per game.

On 31 October 2017, Rusbatch parted ways with the Rams.

==== Hawke's Bay Hawks (2018–2019; 2021–2023) ====
===== 2018 season =====
On 18 January 2018, Rusbatch signed with the Hawke's Bay Hawks for the 2018 New Zealand NBL season. On 1 June, he had a season-best game with 22 points and nine assists in a 91–76 win over the Rams in Christchurch. He subsequently earned Player of the Week honours for round six. On 7 July, he scored a season-high 23 points in a 113–86 win over the Super City Rangers. On 27 July, he had a second 23-point effort in an 85–76 win over the Rams. The Hawks finished the regular season in fourth place with a 12–6 record before losing 99–73 to the Wellington Saints in the semi-finals. Rusbatch appeared in all 19 games for the Hawks in 2018, averaging 13.5 points, 4.5 rebounds and 1.9 assists per game.

===== 2019 season =====
In October 2018, Rusbatch re-signed with the Hawks for the 2019 season. On 13 April 2019, he scored a career-high 34 points in a 98–86 win over the Rangers. He was subsequently named Player of the Week for round one. On 21 April, he scored 33 points in a 105–95 win over the Southern Huskies. Rusbatch impressed over the first four games of the season, leading the league in scoring at 26.5 points per game and hitting 22-of-38 from 3-point range—11 more than the next best. On 25 May, he scored 35 points in a 117–107 win over the Rangers. The Hawks finished the regular season in second place with a 14–4 record. In the Hawks' semi-final against the Rams, Rusbatch scored 20 points in a 74–68 win. In the grand final, Rusbatch scored 18 points in a 78–68 loss to the Saints. For the season, Rusbatch was named the NZNBL's Most Improved Player. In 19 games, he averaged 20.3 points, 5.0 rebounds and 2.2 assists per game.

===== 2021 season =====
Rusbatch was set to re-join the Hawks in 2020, but the team did not enter the modified, COVID-affected season.

In February 2021, Rusbatch recommitted to the Hawks for the 2021 season. On 20 May, he scored a game-high 33 points in a 90–87 win over the Taranaki Mountainairs. On 12 June, he scored 36 points in a 103–73 win over the Otago Nuggets. He helped the Hawks return to the NBL final, where they lost 77–75 to the Wellington Saints. In 19 games, he averaged 16.8 points, 4.2 rebounds, 1.6 assists and 1.1 steals per game.

===== 2022 season =====
In December 2021, Rusbatch re-signed with the Hawks for the 2022 season. On 12 May, he scored a game-high 30 points in an 87–68 win over the Southland Sharks. The Hawks finished the season in sixth place with a 10–8 record and lost to the Otago Nuggets 91–80 in the play-in game despite a team-high 29 points from Rusbatch. In 18 games, he averaged 17.7 points, 6.4 rebounds, 1.7 assists and 1.1 steals per game.

===== 2023 season =====
In March 2023, Rusbatch re-signed with the Hawks for the 2023 season. In the season opener on 6 April, he scored a game-high 29 points in an 84–79 overtime win over the Franklin Bulls. He hit the game-tying 3-pointer to send the game into overtime. In 17 games, he averaged 14.0 points, 5.1 rebounds and 1.2 assists per game.

==== Franklin Bulls (2024–2025) ====
In December 2023, Rusbatch signed with the Franklin Bulls for the 2024 season. He served as team captain in 2024. In 18 games, he averaged 13.7 points, 3.6 rebounds, 1.2 assists and 1.2 steals per game.

In December 2024, Rusbatch re-signed with the Bulls for the 2025 season. In 15 games, he averaged 12.1 points, 3.5 rebounds and 1.7 assists per game.

==== Otago Nuggets (2026–present) ====
In March 2026, Rusbatch signed with the Otago Nuggets for the 2026 season.

=== Australian NBL ===
In January 2016, Rusbatch spent 10 days working out with the Adelaide 36ers of the Australian National Basketball League.

On 24 August 2016, Rusbatch signed with the New Zealand Breakers as a development player for the 2016–17 NBL season. He appeared in three games during the regular season. He was too old for a development player spot in 2017–18 and wasn't re-signed by the Breakers.

On 19 September 2019, Rusbatch signed a full-time contract with the Breakers, returning to the club for a second stint. In 17 games during the 2019–20 NBL season, he averaged 1.6 points per game.

=== Philippine Basketball Association ===
In December 2022, Rusbatch signed with the Converge FiberXers of the Philippine Basketball Association (PBA) as the team's import for the 2023 PBA Governors' Cup. However, he was released on 26 January 2023 after just one game.

=== Korisliiga ===
On 31 October 2024, Rusbatch signed with Tampereen Pyrintö of the Finnish Korisliiga. In 27 games during the 2024–25 season, he averaged 9.6 points, 2.9 rebounds and 1.4 assists per game.

== National team career ==
In June 2015, Rusbatch was named in a 22-man Tall Blacks squad to trial and be considered for selection for the Oceania Series against Australia in August. He attended a camp in Auckland in early July, but was cut prior to the team's European tour.

On 18 May 2016, Rusbatch was one of four debutants named in New Zealand's 14-man squad to travel to Asia in June. He was later cut from the squad on 17 June prior to the team's European tour, but did join the group as injury cover for Corey Webster in July. Webster pulled up lame with a calf strain during New Zealand's tour of Europe, leading to Rusbatch flying to Manila on stand-by ahead of the Olympic qualifying tournament. However, Webster recovered in time for the six-nation event.

On 16 May 2017, Rusbatch was named in an inexperienced New Zealand Select team ahead of their invitational tournament in China in June. Two months later, he was invited to a six-day Tall Blacks camp in Auckland, ahead of a final 12-man roster being named to travel to the FIBA Asia Cup in Lebanon, via preparation matches in China. After a strong performance at the Asia Cup, Rusbatch was in the running to play for the Tall Blacks in the FIBA World Cup qualifiers in November 2017 and February 2018.

On 16 March 2018, Rusbatch was named in the Tall Blacks squad for the Commonwealth Games. He helped the Tall Blacks win bronze at the Commonwealth Games. He re-joined the Tall Blacks for qualifiers in September and November.

In July 2019, Rusbatch was named in a 22-man Tall Blacks squad vying for a spot in the final World Cup squad. He went on to play in the World Cup, and in five games, he averaged 3.6 points per game.

Rusbatch played for the Tall Blacks during FIBA Asia Cup qualifiers in 2021 and FIBA World Cup Asian qualifiers in 2023. He re-joined the Tall Blacks for qualifiers in February 2024.

== Personal life ==
Rusbatch's cousin is former NBA centre Kendrick Perkins. Rusbatch's brother, Bede Marsters, played alongside him at the Rams in 2016. Rusbatch's father is a Cook Islander; Rusbatch sports tribal tattoos that stem from his Pacific Island roots.
