= Jordan Hunt =

New Zealand basketball player

No. 15 – Wellington Saints
- Position: Power forward / centre
- League: NZNBL

Personal information
- Born: 12 September 1997 (age 29) Wellington, New Zealand
- Listed height: 206 cm (6 ft 9 in)
- Listed weight: 104 kg (229 lb)

Career information
- High school: Hutt Valley (Lower Hutt, New Zealand)
- College: Southern Oregon (2016–2020)
- NBA draft: 2020: undrafted
- Playing career: 2015–present

Career history
- 2015–2016; 2018: Wellington Saints
- 2020: Otago Nuggets
- 2020–2021: Cairns Taipans
- 2021–2023: Hawke's Bay Hawks
- 2023–2024: Surrey Scorchers
- 2024–2025: Surrey 89ers
- 2025: Franklin Bulls
- 2026–present: Wellington Saints

Career highlights
- 2× NZNBL champion (2016, 2020); NZNBL Grand Final MVP (2020)
Medals
Men's basketball
Representing New Zealand
FIBA Asia Cup
Bronze medal – third place	2022 Jakarta

Jordan Hunt (born 12 September 1997) is a New Zealand professional basketball player for the Wellington Saints of the New Zealand National Basketball League (NZNBL). He debuted in the New Zealand NBL in 2015 with the Saints and won a championship with them in 2016. After four years of college basketball in the United States with the Southern Oregon Raiders, he helped the Otago Nuggets win the NZNBL championship in 2020 while earning grand final MVP. He subsequently spent the 2020–21 NBL season in Australia with the Cairns Taipans as a development player.

== Early life and career ==
Hunt was born in Wellington, New Zealand, and attended Hutt Valley High School in nearby Lower Hutt. In 2015, he debuted in the New Zealand NBL for the Wellington Saints, playing two games. In 2016, he played eight games for the Saints and was a member of their championship-winning team. He returned to the Saints for a one-game stint in 2018.

== College career ==
As a freshman at Southern Oregon in 2016–17, Hunt averaged 10.4 points, 5.8 rebounds and 1.5 blocks per game. He scored a season-high 21 points against Oregon Tech on 31 January 2017.

As a sophomore in 2017–18, Hunt was named All-Cascade Conference honourable mention and earned Academic All-conference honors. He averaged 13.0 points, 6.6 rebounds and 1.4 blocks per game. He scored a season-high 20 points to go with 11 rebounds on 1 November 2017 against Maine-Fort Kent.

As a junior in 2018–19, Hunt was again named All-Cascade Conference honorable mention and Academic All-conference. He averaged 13.5 points, 7.0 rebounds and 1.6 blocks per game, and became the 23rd player in Southern Oregon Raiders' history to reach 1,000 career points. He scored a season-high 22 points on 30 December 2018 against Multnomah.

As a senior in 2019–20, Hunt averaged 12.9 points, 5.6 rebounds and 1.5 assists in 28 games.

Hunt finished his career at Southern Oregon with 1,147 points, ranking him 11th on the school's all-time scorers list. He also had 741 rebounds to finish eighth all time in school history.

== Professional career ==
In June 2020, Hunt was acquired by the Otago Nuggets of the New Zealand NBL in a draft prior to the COVID-altered 2020 season. He helped the Nuggets reach the grand final, where they defeated the Manawatu Jets 79–77 to win the championship behind Hunt's team-high 21 points, which earned him grand final MVP. In 16 games, he averaged 19.6 points and 6.1 rebounds per game.

In December 2020, Hunt signed with the Cairns Taipans in Australia as a development player for the 2020–21 NBL season. He averaged 2.8 points in five games.

Following the Australian NBL season, Hunt joined the Hawke's Bay Hawks for the rest of the 2021 New Zealand NBL season. He helped the Hawks reach the grand final, where they lost 77–75 to the Wellington Saints. In 13 games, he averaged 11.2 points and 4.2 rebounds per game.

In December 2021, Hunt re-signed with the Hawks for the 2022 New Zealand NBL season. In 15 games, he averaged 15.5 points, 6.2 rebounds, 1.4 assists, 1.1 steals and 1.0 blocks per game.

In January 2023, Hunt re-signed with the Hawks for the 2023 New Zealand NBL season. In 19 games, he averaged 10.8 points, 5.2 rebounds, 1.4 assists and 1.0 blocks per game.

In August 2023, Hunt joined the Surrey Scorchers of the British Basketball League (BBL) for the 2023–24 season. In early January 2024, he sustained a fracture to the fibula of his left leg. In 11 BBL games, he averaged 8.3 points, 4.0 rebounds, 1.7 assists and 1.0 blocks per game.

Hunt had signed with the Franklin Bulls for the 2024 New Zealand NBL season and had hoped to join the team a third into the season, but he ultimately required a longer recovery from the broken leg than initially expected.

In August 2024, Hunt signed with the Surrey 89ers of the Super League Basketball for the 2024–25 season. In 31 games, he averaged 5.2 points, 3.5 rebounds and 1.3 assists per game.

In May 2025, Hunt was acquired by the Franklin Bulls for the rest of the 2025 New Zealand NBL season. In 10 games, he averaged 6.3 points, 5.1 rebounds and 1.3 assists per game.

In February 2026, Hunt signed with the Wellington Saints for the 2026 New Zealand NBL season.

== National team career ==
Hunt made his debut for the New Zealand national team in February 2021. He helped New Zealand win bronze at the 2022 FIBA Asia Cup.

In July 2025, Hunt was named in the Tall Blacks squad for the FIBA Solidarity Cup and Four Nations Tournament in China.

== Personal life ==
Hunt's father Brett played in the NZNBL, while his twin sister Madison also played basketball in high school.
