= New Zealand NBL Most Improved Player Award =

The National Basketball League Most Improved Player is an annual National Basketball League (NBL) award first presented in the 2019 New Zealand NBL season to an up-and-coming player who made a dramatic improvement from the previous season or seasons. It was not awarded in 2020.

== Winners ==
| Year | Player | Nationality | Team | Ref |
|---|---|---|---|---|
| 2019 | Ethan Rusbatch | New Zealand | Hawke's Bay Hawks | |
| 2020 | N/A | N/A | N/A | |
| 2021 | Sam Timmins | New Zealand | Otago Nuggets | |
| 2022 | Sam Dempster | New Zealand | Nelson Giants | |
| 2023 | Charlie Dalton | New Zealand | Auckland Tuatara | |
| 2024 | Taylor Britt | New Zealand | Canterbury Rams | |
| 2025 | Jackson Ball | New Zealand | Hawke's Bay Hawks | |
| 2026 | Walter Brown | New Zealand | Canterbury Rams | |

== See also ==
- List of National Basketball League (New Zealand) awards
