= Derone Raukawa =

New Zealand basketball player (born 1994)

Personal information
- Born: 24 July 1994 (age 32) Palmerston North, New Zealand
- Listed height: 181 cm (5 ft 11 in)
- Listed weight: 80 kg (176 lb)

Career information
- High school: Rangitoto College (Auckland, New Zealand)
- Playing career: 2014–2024
- Position: Point guard / shooting guard

Career history
- 2014–2015: Manawatu Jets
- 2016–2018: Southland Sharks
- 2016–2018: New Zealand Breakers
- 2019–2020: Taranaki Mountainairs
- 2021–2023: Hawke's Bay Hawks
- 2024: Taranaki Airs

Career highlights
- NZNBL champion (2018); NZNBL All-Star Five (2020); NZNBL Most Outstanding Kiwi Guard (2023); NZNBL scoring champion (2020); NZNBL assist champion (2020)
Medals
Representing New Zealand
Men's basketball
Commonwealth Games
| Bronze medal – third place | 2018 Gold Coast | Team competition |

Derone Jordan Raukawa (born 24 July 1994) is a New Zealand former basketball player who played 11 seasons in the New Zealand National Basketball League (NZNBL) between 2014 and 2024.

== Early life ==
Raukawa was born in Palmerston North, New Zealand. He originally lived in nearby Levin before leaving at the age of 5. He lived in Tauranga, moved to Australia and returned to Auckland. In 2011, Raukawa played for Otumoetai College and the Tauranga rep team before moving to Auckland at the start of 2012, where he enrolled at Rosmini College. That same year, he joined the New Zealand Breakers Academy and often trained with the senior team. He also had two weeks in China, where he captained the Junior Tall Blacks against Slovenia, the United States and China. He then played for Waitakere West at the national under-21 tournament in Porirua before leading Waitakere West to the under-19 title in Dunedin, downing North Harbour 90–89 in the final. He was subsequently named to the all-tournament team.

Raukawa moved schools once again in 2013, this time to Rangitoto College. He guided Rangitoto to the 2013 National Secondary Schools Basketball Final, where they lost to Westlake Boys High School. He scored 35 points in the final and was named to the all-tournament team.

== Professional career ==
=== New Zealand NBL ===
After spending the 2013 New Zealand NBL season as an extended squad member of the Waikato Pistons, Raukawa joined the Manawatu Jets in 2014 on an amateur contract, so as to keep his eligibility to play college basketball in the United States. He earned co-Rookie of the Week honours for Round 4 after scoring a season-high 21 points on 7-of-12 shooting against the Nelson Giants. In 12 games for the Jets in 2014, Raukawa averaged 4.8 points and 1.4 rebounds per game.

Raukawa returned to the Jets for the 2015 season and became a valuable role player of the bench. In 17 games for the Jets in 2015, he averaged 10.3 points, 2.2 rebounds and 1.7 assists per game.

On 6 November 2015, Raukawa signed with the Southland Sharks for the 2016 New Zealand NBL season. He made his debut for the Sharks in the team's season opener on 12 March 2016, scoring a team-high 20 points on 8-of-12 shooting off the bench in a 106–80 loss to the Nelson Giants. On 3 April, he started for the Sharks in place of the injured Jordair Jett and scored a career-high 24 points in 30½ minutes of action in a 101–87 win over the Hawke's Bay Hawks. Raukawa was considered a "surprise package" and ended up playing big minutes. He helped the Sharks finish the regular season in third place with an 11–7 record. In their semi-final game against the Wellington Saints, the Sharks were defeated 79–75. Raukawa appeared in 18 of the team's 19 games in 2016, averaging 10.8 points, 1.8 rebounds and 2.7 assists per game.

On 6 September 2016, Raukawa re-signed with the Sharks for the 2017 season. In the Sharks' 2017 season opener on 16 March, Raukawa scored an equal game-high 19 points off the bench in a 96–58 win over the Nelson Giants. On 29 March, he was ruled out of the Sharks' Round 3 road trip due to a hip injury. He was later ruled out of their Round 4 clash against the Super City Rangers as well due to his hip problem. On 5 May, he scored a team-high 18 points off the bench in a 105–94 win over the Canterbury Rams. The Sharks finished the regular season in second place with a 12–6 record, and went on to reach the grand final after defeating the Rangers in their semi-final clash. In the championship decider on 17 June, Raukawa came off the bench to score a team-high 15 points in a 108–75 loss to the Wellington Saints. In 17 games for the Sharks in 2017, he averaged 10.2 points, 1.8 rebounds and 2.5 assists per game.

On 25 October 2017, Raukawa re-signed with the Sharks for the 2018 season. On 10 May 2018, he recorded 14 points, eight rebounds and eight assists in a 109–79 win over the Manawatu Jets. On 9 June, he had 11 assists in a 118–91 win over the Jets. The Sharks finished the regular season in third place with a 13–5 record, and went on to reach the grand final after defeating the Giants in their semi-final clash. In the championship decider on 5 August, Raukawa came off the bench and scored 16 points in 29½ minutes, as the Sharks defeated the Saints 98–96 to win the title. He appeared in all 20 games for the Sharks in 2018, averaging 9.0 points, 2.2 rebounds and 3.3 assists per game.

On 25 January 2019, Raukawa signed with the Taranaki Mountainairs for the 2019 season. In his debut for the Mountainairs on 13 April 2019, Raukawa recorded 16 points and six assists in a 93–78 season-opening loss to the Giants. On 15 June, he scored 25 points in a 101–78 loss to the Saints. He was subsequently named to the NZNBL Team of the Week for Round 10. On 4 July, he scored 26 points in a 113–93 win over the Manawatu Jets. The Mountainairs finished the regular season in eighth place with a 3–15 record. In 13 games, Raukawa averaged 17.2 points, 2.4 rebounds, 2.8 assists and 1.5 steals per game.

In January 2020, Raukawa signed with the Hawke's Bay Hawks for the 2020 season. However, following a revised competition format due to the COVID-19 pandemic that led to the Hawks withdrawing from the league, Raukawa was reacquired by the Mountainairs in June 2020. In the season opener, he had 28 points, 10 assists and six rebounds in a 112–96 win over the Nelson Giants. He was the leader in MVP voting at the halfway point of the season. He scored a then season-high 29 points on 19 July against the Manawatu Jets. He finished the regular season as both the scoring (22.8) and assist (7.6) champion. He subsequently finished third in MVP voting and earned NZNBL All-Star Five honours. In Taranaki's semi-final, Raukawa scored a game-high 32 points in a 105–95 loss to the Jets.

On 2 March 2021, Raukawa signed with the Hawke's Bay Hawks for the 2021 season. In his debut for the Hawks on 2 May, Raukawa scored 25 points in a 104–90 season-opening win over the Canterbury Rams. Six days later, he scored a game-high 28 points in an 85–73 win over the Southland Sharks. He helped the Hawks reach the NBL final, where they lost 77–75 to the Wellington Saints. In 18 games, he averaged 12.3 points, 2.5 rebounds, 3.6 assists and 1.0 steals per game.

On 5 January 2022, Raukawa re-signed with the Hawks for the 2022 season. In 18 games, he averaged 13.5 points, 3.1 rebounds and 3.9 assists per game.

On 6 March 2023, Raukawa re-signed with the Hawks for the 2023 season. On 20 April, he scored a game-high 32 points in a 110–103 triple-overtime loss to the Canterbury Rams. In 18 games, he averaged 15.8 points, 1.9 rebounds and 2.7 assists per game.

In February 2024, Raukawa signed with the Taranaki Airs for the 2024 season, returning to the team for a second stint. In 22 games, he averaged 8.8 points, 1.5 rebounds and 2.0 assists per game.

=== New Zealand Breakers ===
For the 2015–16 NBL season, Raukawa joined the New Zealand Breakers training squad.

On 24 August 2016, Raukawa signed with the Breakers as a development player for the 2016–17 NBL season. On 17 September 2016, in the team's final pre-season game against the Brisbane Bullets, Raukawa played in front of his home crowd in Southland and finished with a team-high 13 points on 4-of-11 shooting in 28 minutes. He later sustained a broken finger, which resulted in missing the first six weeks of the regular season. He appeared in just one game for the Breakers during the 2016–17 season, making his NBL debut on 18 November 2016 against the Illawarra Hawks.

On 23 August 2017, Raukawa re-signed with the Breakers as a development player for the 2017–18 NBL season. He recorded two rebounds in four games during the season.

== National team career ==
In 2012, Raukawa played for the New Zealand Junior Tall Blacks at the FIBA Oceania U18 Championship.

On 5 June 2016, Raukawa was named a replacement for Jarrod Kenny on the New Zealand Tall Blacks roster for their Asia tour and their FIBA Olympic Qualifying Tournament campaign. He made the final 12-man squad two weeks later after impressing head coach Paul Henare.

On 16 May 2017, Raukawa was named in an inexperienced New Zealand Select team ahead of their invitational tournament in China in June. Two months later, he was invited to a six-day Tall Blacks camp in Auckland, ahead of a final 12-man roster being named to travel to the FIBA Asia Cup in Lebanon, via preparation matches in China. In six games for the Tall Blacks during the FIBA Asia Cup, Raukawa averaged 10.0 points, 3.2 rebounds and 1.8 assists per game.

On 16 March 2018, Raukawa was named in the Tall Blacks squad for the Commonwealth Games. He helped the Tall Blacks win bronze at the Commonwealth Games.

In December 2018, Raukawa played for the Tall Blacks during the FIBA Basketball World Cup qualifiers.

== Personal ==
Raukawa's father, Andrew McKay, also played in the New Zealand NBL for the Waikato Pistons.
