= Sam Timmins =

New Zealand basketball player (born 1997)

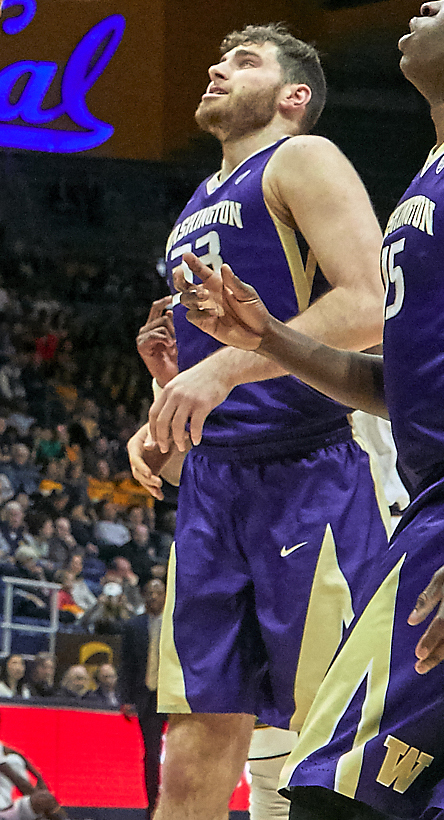
- Timmins with the Washington Huskies in 2018

No. 11 – Shinagawa City Basketball Club
- Position: Power forward / center
- League: B.League

Personal information
- Born: 23 May 1997 (age 29) Dunedin, New Zealand
- Listed height: 211 cm (6 ft 11 in)
- Listed weight: 120 kg (265 lb)

Career information
- High school: Otago Boys' (Dunedin, New Zealand); Middleton Grange School (Christchurch, New Zealand)
- College: Washington (2016–2020)
- Playing career: 2013–present

Career history
- 2013: Otago Nuggets
- 2015: Canterbury Rams
- 2020: Franklin Bulls
- 2020–2021: Tallinna Kalev/TLÜ
- 2021–2023: Otago Nuggets
- 2021–2023: New Zealand Breakers
- 2023–2024: Sydney Kings
- 2024: Franklin Bulls
- 2024–2025: Tryhoop Okayama
- 2025–2026: Southland Sharks
- 2025–2026: Chun Lung
- 2026–present: Shinagawa City Basketball Club

Career highlights
- 2× NZNBL champion (2022, 2026); NZNBL Grand Final MVP (2026); 2× NZNBL All-Star Five (2021, 2026); 2× NZNBL Most Outstanding Forward (2021, 2026); 2× NZNBL Most Outstanding Kiwi Forward/Centre (2021, 2026); NZNBL Defensive Player of the Year (2026); NZNBL Most Improved Player (2021); 2× NZNBL rebounding leader (2021, 2026); 3× NZNBL blocks leader (2020, 2024, 2026)
Medals
Men's basketball
Representing New Zealand
FIBA Asia Cup
Bronze medal – third place	2022 Jakarta

Samuel Alexander William Timmins (born 23 May 1997) is a New Zealand professional basketball player for Shinagawa City Basketball Club of the Japanese B.League. He played college basketball for the Washington Huskies. In 2022, he helped the Otago Nuggets of the New Zealand National Basketball League (NZNBL) win the NZNBL championship. He won his second NZNBL championship with the Southland Sharks in 2026.

== Early life and career ==
Timmins was born in Dunedin, New Zealand. His father, Brendon Timmins, played rugby in Otago during the 1990s and in Southland in the early 2000s. While living in Southland, Sam played rugby for Eastern Hawks and Star.

When he was 11 years old, his family moved to Japan after his father became a rugby coach for the Mitsubishi Sagamihara DynaBoars. Back in Dunedin, he was heavily involved in rugby until age 12, playing as a lock and Number 8 for the Kaikorai club. He grew up playing social basketball, but only began to take the game seriously after arriving at Otago Boys' High School.

In 2013, Timmins joined the Otago Nuggets and made his New Zealand National Basketball League (NZNBL) debut. At age 15, he became the youngest debutant in Nuggets history. A stress fracture in his back sidelined him for the entire 2014 season. That year, he led Otago Boys' High School to the National Schools Championship and was named tournament MVP. He also helped the Junior Tall Blacks come within three points of winning the Under-18 Oceania Championship final.

In January 2015, following the collapse of the Otago Nuggets, Timmins moved to Christchurch to play for the Canterbury Rams and attend Middleton Grange School. In his debut for the Rams, he had 20 points and nine rebounds. In 16 games during the 2015 season, he averaged 5.7 points and 3.4 rebounds per game.

== College career ==
On 29 April 2015, Timmins signed a National Letter of Intent to play college basketball for the Washington Huskies in 2016–17. He joined the Huskies in December 2015 and practiced and travelled with the team for the remainder of the 2015–16 season.

As a freshman in 2016–17, Timmins saw action in 31 games including 18 starts and averaged 3.2 points and 3.8 rebounds while adding 20 blocks and shooting 48.9 per cent from the field. He had a season-high 12 rebounds on two occasions, with his season high in points being 11.

As a sophomore in 2017–18, Timmins started in all 34 games and averaged 4.3 points and 4.6 rebounds per game. He set a career high during the season with 13 points against Kennesaw State.

As a junior in 2018–19, Timmins competed in all 36 games while shooting 62 per cent from the field (31-of-50) and averaging 1.9 points and 2.2 rebounds per game. His minutes dropped from 18.0 per game as a sophomore to 10.4 per game as a junior. He had a season-high nine points against UCLA, and had a season-best seven rebounds against Utah while also recording a career-high-tying four blocks.

As a senior in 2019–20, Timmins averaged a career-low 7.9 minutes per game to go with 2.0 points and 1.4 rebounds in 31 games.

== Professional career ==
On 18 March 2020, Timmins signed with the Franklin Bulls for the 2020 New Zealand NBL season. On 2 July 2020, he recorded 24 points and 12 rebounds in an 85–79 win over the Otago Nuggets. He led the league in blocked shots with 1.9 per game.

On 18 December 2020, Timmins signed in Estonia with Tallinna Kalev/TLÜ of the Korvpalli Meistriliiga and Baltic Basketball League. In six games, he averaged 10.7 points, 9.7 rebounds, 1.3 assists, 1.5 steals and 2.2 blocks per game. After returning to New Zealand, he joined the Otago Nuggets for the 2021 New Zealand NBL season. On 15 May, he recorded 29 points and 25 rebounds in a 92–85 overtime win over the Manawatu Jets. On 10 June, he recorded 18 points, 18 rebounds and 10 assists in a 95–82 win over the Canterbury Rams. He was named NZNBL Most Outstanding Forward, NZNBL Most Outstanding NZ Forward/Centre, NZNBL Most Improved Player and NZNBL All-Star Five.

On 30 June 2021, Timmins signed with the New Zealand Breakers of the Australian National Basketball League (NBL) on a one-year development contract, with a club option for a second year. On 15 April 2022, he was elevated to the full roster following the departure of Yanni Wetzell. In 15 games during the 2021–22 NBL season, he averaged 3.3 points and 2.3 rebounds per game.

Timmins re-joined the Nuggets for the 2022 New Zealand NBL season and helped the team win the championship.

On 28 April 2022, Timmins re-signed with the Breakers for the 2022–23 NBL season.

Timmins re-joined the Nuggets for the 2023 New Zealand NBL season.

On 20 July 2023, Timmins signed with the Sydney Kings for the 2023–24 NBL season. He missed the start of the season with a calf strain.

Timmins joined the Franklin Bulls for the 2024 New Zealand NBL season.

On 24 June 2024, Timmins signed with Tryhoop Okayama of the Japanese B.League.

Timmins joined the Southland Sharks for the 2025 New Zealand NBL season.

In October 2025, Timmins signed with Chun Lung of the Hong Kong A1 Division Championship.

Timmins re-joined the Sharks for the 2026 New Zealand NBL season. On 16 April 2026, he recorded 26 points, 19 rebounds, 10 assists and five blocks in a 94–86 win over the Franklin Bulls. He finished the regular season averaging league highs of 11.0 rebounds and 2.1 blocks per game. He was subsequently named NZNBL Defensive Player of the Year and earned NZNBL All-Star Five honours for the second time. He was also named NZNBL Most Outstanding Forward and NZNBL Most Outstanding NZ Forward/Centre for the second time. He helped the Sharks reach the grand final, where they defeated the Wellington Saints 104–101 in overtime to win the championship. Timmins was named NZNBL Grand Final MVP for his 23 points and 21 rebounds.

On 22 August 2026, Timmins signed with Shinagawa City Basketball Club of the Japanese B.League.

== National team career ==
In June 2015, Timmins helped New Zealand win the FIBA 3x3 Under-18 World Championship in Hungary. He was also a member of the Tall Blacks extended squad in the lead up to the 2015 FIBA Oceania Championship.

On 12 July 2017, Timmins was invited to a six-day Tall Blacks camp in Auckland, ahead of a final 12-man roster being named to travel to the FIBA Asia Cup in Lebanon, via preparation matches in China.

Timmins played for the Tall Blacks at the 2022 FIBA Asia Cup.

In July 2023, Timmins was named in the Tall Blacks squad for the 2023 FIBA World Cup. He re-joined the Tall Blacks for qualifiers in February 2024.

In February 2026, Timmins joined the Tall Blacks during the FIBA Basketball World Cup 2027 Asian Qualifiers. In June 2026, he was named in the squad for two more Asian qualifiers. In August 2026, he was named in the Tall Blacks squad for the next Asian qualifier window.

== Career statistics ==
Legend
GP	Games played	GS	Games started	MPG	Minutes per game
FG%	Field goal percentage	3P%	3-point field goal percentage	FT%	Free throw percentage
RPG	Rebounds per game	APG	Assists per game	SPG	Steals per game
BPG	Blocks per game	PPG	Points per game	**Bold**	Career high

=== College ===
Year	Team	GP	GS	MPG	FG%	3P%	FT%	RPG	APG	SPG	BPG	PPG
2016–17	Washington	31	18	14.5	.489	.286	.375	3.8	**.3**	**.4**	.6	3.2
2017–18	Washington	34	**34**	**18.0**	.577	–	.559	**4.6**	.2	**.4**	**1.0**	**4.3**
2018–19	Washington	**36**	7	10.4	.620	–	.364	2.2	**.3**	.3	.7	1.9
2019–20	Washington	31	2	7.9	**.625**	**.375**	**.588**	1.4	.2	.2	.4	2.0
Career		132	61	12.7	.563	.333	.500	3.0	.2	.3	.7	2.8

== Personal life ==
Timmins is the son of Brendon and Karen Timmins, and has a sister named Ruby. His father played 74 games for the Otago rugby team and 42 games for the Highlanders, while his mother played netball for Southland. His grandmother, Sandra McGookin, was a six-time New Zealand javelin champion.
