= Jordan Ngatai =

New Zealand basketball player (born 1993)

No. 11 – Tauranga Whai
- Position: Small forward
- League: NZNBL

Personal information
- Born: 7 March 1993 (age 33) Sydney, New South Wales, Australia
- Listed height: 196 cm (6 ft 5 in)
- Listed weight: 100 kg (220 lb)

Career information
- High school: Mana College (Porirua, New Zealand)
- College: Sierra College (2012–2013); BYU–Hawaii (2013–2014)
- NBA draft: 2014: undrafted
- Playing career: 2012–present

Career history
- 2012: Wellington Saints
- 2014: Wellington Saints
- 2014–2020: New Zealand Breakers
- 2015: Manawatu Jets
- 2016: Taranaki Mountainairs
- 2017–2019: Wellington Saints
- 2020: Otago Nuggets
- 2020–2022: Cairns Taipans
- 2022: Wellington Saints
- 2023–2024: Hawke's Bay Hawks
- 2023–2024: Pyrintö
- 2024–2025: Kapfenberg Bulls
- 2025: Wellington Saints
- 2026: Kagawa Five Arrows
- 2026: Levanga Hokkaido
- 2026: Koshigaya Alphas
- 2026–present: Tauranga Whai

Career highlights
- NBL champion (2015); 5× NZNBL champion (2014, 2017, 2019, 2020, 2025); NZNBL All-Star Five (2020)
Medals
Men's basketball
Representing New Zealand
Commonwealth Games
Bronze medal – third place	2018 Gold Coast

Jordan Ngatai (born 7 March 1993) is a New Zealand professional basketball player for the Tauranga Whai of the New Zealand National Basketball League (NZNBL). He played six seasons with the New Zealand Breakers in the Australian NBL and is a regular New Zealand Tall Black. In the New Zealand NBL, he is a five-time champion.

== Early life and career ==
Ngatai was born in Sydney, New South Wales, in the suburb of Paddington. He was raised in New Zealand, in Porirua and Ngāti Toa, where he attended Mana College.

In 2012–13, Ngatai played college basketball for Sierra College in the United States. In 2013–14, he played for BYU–Hawaii.

== Professional career ==
Ngatai made his debut in the New Zealand NBL in 2012 with the Wellington Saints. His next stint came in 2014, helping the Saints win the New Zealand NBL championship. He subsequently joined the New Zealand Breakers of the Australian National Basketball League (NBL) as a development player for the 2014–15 season, where he was a member of the Breakers' NBL championship-winning team. He went on to play in the 2015 New Zealand NBL season with the Manawatu Jets and then re-joined the Breakers as a development player for the 2015–16 NBL season.

After playing with the Taranaki Mountainairs in the 2016 New Zealand NBL season, Ngatai was promoted to the full-time playing roster of the Breakers for the 2016–17 NBL season.

In 2017 and 2019, Ngatai won championships with the Wellington Saints. He was acquired by the Otago Nuggets for the 2020 season, going on to win his fourth NZNBL championship.

On 14 August 2020, Ngatai signed a two-year deal with the Cairns Taipans.

Ngatai returned to the Wellington Saints in 2022 and then joined the Hawke's Bay Hawks in 2023. On 15 July 2023, he scored a career-high 47 points in a 106–81 win over the Manawatu Jets.

On 4 December 2023, Ngatai signed with Pyrintö of the Finnish Korisliiga for the rest of the 2023–24 season.

Ngatai re-joined the Hawke's Bay Hawks for the 2024 New Zealand NBL season.

In August 2024, Ngatai signed with the Kapfenberg Bulls of the Austrian Basketball Superliga.

In May 2025, Ngatai was acquired by the Wellington Saints for the rest of the 2025 New Zealand NBL season. He went on to help the Saints win the championship, marking his fifth overall and fourth with the team.

On 15 January 2026, Ngatai signed with the Kagawa Five Arrows of the Japanese B3 League. After eight games between 16 January and 7 February, he joined Levanga Hokkaido of the B.League on 13 February. He played two games on 14 February and 15 February before having his contracted terminated on 5 March. On 10 March, he joined Koshigaya Alphas. In 19 games to finish the 2025–26 B1 League season, he averaged 6.5 points, 2.6 rebounds and 2.9 assists per game.

In May 2026, Ngatai joined the Tauranga Whai for the rest of the 2026 New Zealand NBL season.

== National team career ==
Ngatai made his senior international debut for the Tall Blacks in 2013 at the FIBA Oceania Championships. He represented New Zealand at the 2017 FIBA Asia Cup in Lebanon, where the team ended up in fourth position. He was a key member of the national side which claimed the bronze medal at the 2018 Commonwealth Games. He was included in the New Zealand squad for the 2019 FIBA Basketball World Cup.

In July 2023, Ngatai was named in the Tall Blacks squad for the 2023 FIBA World Cup. He re-joined the Tall Blacks for qualifiers in February 2024.

In July 2025, Ngatai was named in the Tall Blacks squad for the 2025 FIBA Asia Cup.

In February 2026, Ngatai was named in the Tall Blacks squad for the second window of the FIBA Basketball World Cup 2027 Asian Qualifiers. In June 2026, he was named in the squad for two more Asian qualifiers. In August 2026, he was named in the Tall Blacks squad for the next Asian qualifier window. In November 2026, he was named in the squad as captain for two more Asian qualifiers, where he played his 100th game for the Tall Blacks.
