= Jarrod Kenny =

New Zealand basketball player (born 1985)

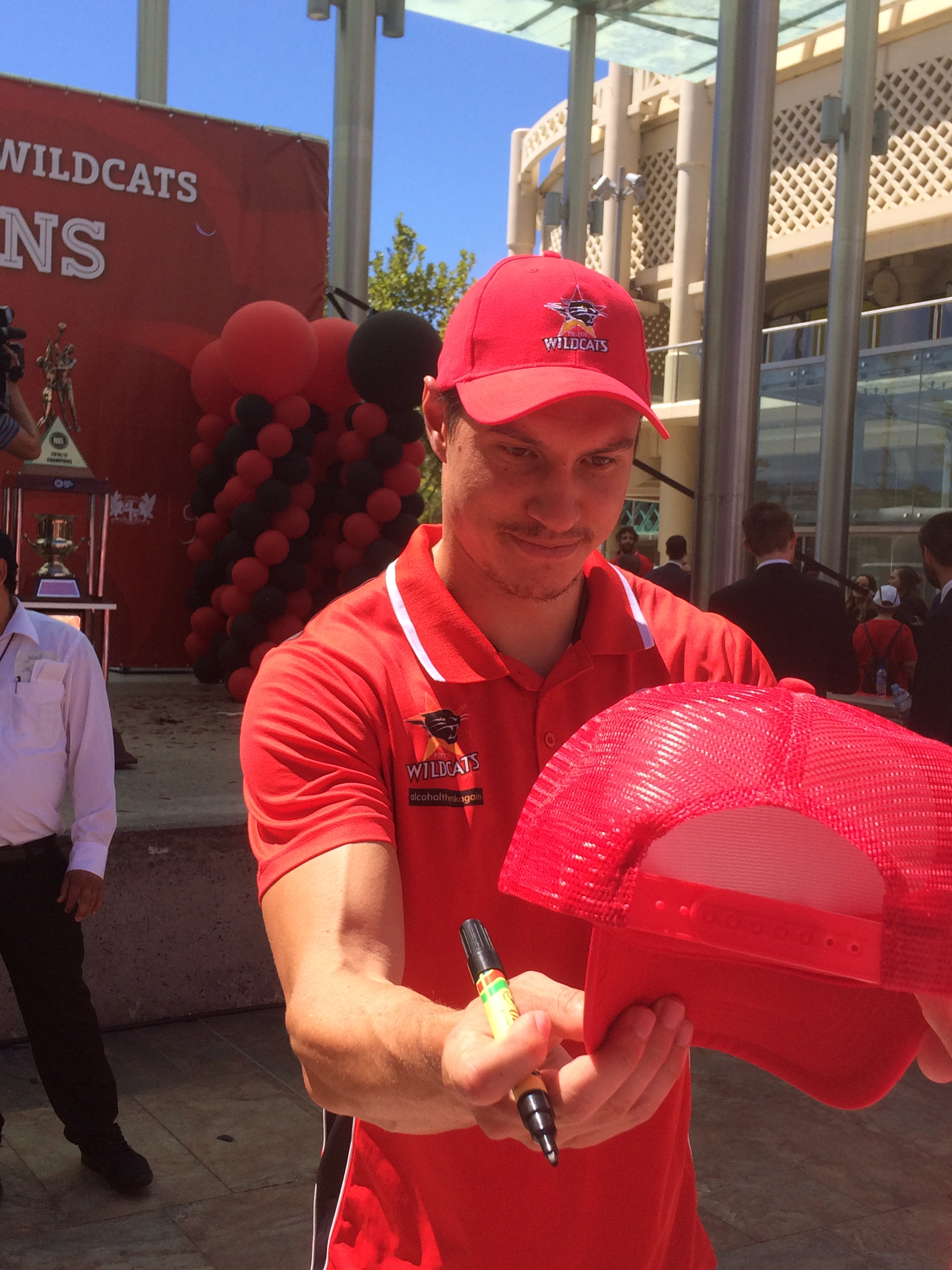
- Kenny in March 2017

Personal information
- Born: 17 September 1985 (age 41) Auckland, New Zealand
- Listed height: 186 cm (6 ft 1 in)
- Listed weight: 88 kg (194 lb)

Career information
- High school: Westlake Boys (Auckland, New Zealand)
- Playing career: 2004–2024
- Position: Point guard

Career history
- 2004–2008: Harbour Heat
- 2009–2015: Hawke's Bay Hawks
- 2014–2015: Licher BasketBären
- 2015–2018: Perth Wildcats
- 2016: Nelson Giants
- 2017–2019: Hawke's Bay Hawks
- 2018–2022: Cairns Taipans
- 2020: Otago Nuggets
- 2021–2024: Hawke's Bay Hawks

Career highlights
- 2× NBL champion (2016, 2017); NZNBL champion (2020); NZNBL Defensive Player of the Year (2020); NZNBL Young Player of the Year (2005); 2× NZNBL assist champion (2017, 2019)
Medals
Representing New Zealand
Men's basketball
Commonwealth Games
Bronze medal – third place	2018 Gold Coast	Team competition

Jarrod Daniel Kenny (born 17 September 1985) is a New Zealand former professional basketball player. He played 21 seasons in the New Zealand National Basketball League (NZNBL) between 2004 and 2024, including 14 with the Hawke's Bay Hawks and winning a NZNBL championship with the Otago Nuggets in 2020. He played seven seasons in the Australian National Basketball League (NBL), winning two NBL championships with the Perth Wildcats in 2016 and 2017. He represented the New Zealand Tall Blacks between 2009 and 2021.

== Early life ==
Kenny was born in Auckland, New Zealand. He attended Westlake Boys High School.

== Professional career ==
=== New Zealand NBL ===
Kenny made his debut in the New Zealand NBL for the Harbour Heat in 2004, playing a handful of games at the end of the season. He played every game and started all but two for the Heat in 2005, subsequently earning the New Zealand NBL Young Player of the Year Award. He played for the Heat until 2008.

Kenny joined the Hawke's Bay Hawks in 2009 and played the next seven seasons with the team.

After a season with the Nelson Giants in 2016, Kenny returned to the Hawks for the 2017 season. On 1 April 2017, he recorded 22 points and 15 assists in the Hawks' 102–91 loss to the Wellington Saints.

Kenny continued on with the Hawks in 2018 and 2019.

In June 2020, Kenny was acquired by the Otago Nuggets for the 2020 season. In his 19th season in the league, he won his first championship and earned co-Defensive Player of the Year honours alongside Izayah Le'afa.

Kenny returned to the Hawks in 2021 and continued on in 2022, 2023 and 2024.

=== Australian NBL and Germany ===
After being part of the New Zealand Breakers squad during the 2013–14 NBL season, Kenny had a short stint with Licher BasketBären during the 2014–15 German ProB season.

On 1 September 2015, Kenny signed with the Perth Wildcats for the 2015–16 NBL season. He saw plenty of court time in his rookie season, particularly during the first half of the year with Damian Martin injured. He helped the Wildcats win the NBL championship.

On 11 May 2016, Kenny re-signed with the Wildcats on a three-year deal. He missed time early in the 2016–17 NBL season with a groin strain. Despite his minutes decreasing, Kenny remained a crucial figure for the Wildcats as he helped the team win back-to-back championships.

In January of the 2017–18 season, Kenny began playing in career-best form. His scoring improved by nearly six points per game, while his percentage from beyond the arc spiked by almost 30 per cent. On 22 April 2018, the Wildcats parted ways with Kenny after opting not to take the club option on his contract.

On 26 April 2018, Kenny signed with the Cairns Taipans. He played the next four seasons with the Taipans.

== National team career ==
In July 2009, Kenny was named in his first New Zealand Tall Blacks squad. He made his debut at the 2009 FIBA Oceania Championship.

Kenny's next stints with the Tall Blacks were at the 2011 FIBA Oceania Championship, 2012 FIBA World Olympic Qualifying Tournament, 2013 FIBA Oceania Championship, 2014 FIBA Basketball World Cup, and 2015 FIBA Oceania Championship. He was ruled out of the Tall Blacks' 2016 Olympic campaign due to injury.

Kenny's final stints with the Tall Blacks came at the FIBA Basketball World Cup 2019 Asian Qualifiers and the FIBA Asia Cup 2021 Qualifiers.

== Personal life ==
Kenny is the son of Danny and Liz Kenny. His fiancé, Ailbhe Madden, is Irish.

Kenny graduated from Auckland University of Technology in 2009 with a physiotherapy degree.

In November 2022, Kenny was appointed general manager of the Hawke's Bay Hawks. He was named the NZNBL General Manager of the Year for the 2025 season.
