= New Zealand NBL Finals Most Valuable Player Award =

The National Basketball League Finals Most Valuable Player is an annual National Basketball League (NBL) award currently given to the best performing player over the finals or grand final. The award has previously been known as Final MVP and Final Four MVP.

The origin of the award began with a "Final MVP" that was awarded between 2004 and 2006. Between 2008 and 2012, a "Finals MVP" was awarded to the best player of the best-of-three championship round (2008–10) and then the best player of the Final Four weekend (2011–12). A "Final Four MVP" was introduced for 2013 and 2014 before a switch back to Finals MVP every year between 2015 and 2018. Every year between 2019 and 2026, a "Grand Final MVP" was awarded.

== Winners ==
Denotes players that also won the regular season MVP that season.

=== Final MVP (2004–06) ===
Year	Player	Nationality	Team	Ref
2004	Aaron Olson	New Zealand	Auckland Stars	
2005	Dillon Boucher	New Zealand	Auckland Stars	
2006	Paora Winitana	New Zealand	Hawke's Bay Hawks	

=== Finals MVP (2008–12) ===
Year	Player	Nationality	Team	Ref
2008	Puke Lenden	New Zealand	Waikato Pistons	
2009	Justin Bailey	United States	Waikato Pistons	
2010	Lindsay Tait	New Zealand	Wellington Saints	
2011	Lindsay Tait (2)	New Zealand	Wellington Saints	
2012	Alex Pledger	New Zealand	Auckland Pirates	

=== Final Four MVP (2013–14) ===
Year	Player	Nationality	Team	Ref
2013	Leon Henry	New Zealand	Southland Sharks	
2014	Lindsay Tait (3)	New Zealand	Wellington Saints	

=== Finals MVP (2015–18) ===
Year	Player	Nationality	Team	Ref
2015	Tai Wesley	Guam	Southland Sharks	
2016	Tai Wesley (2)	Guam	Wellington Saints	
2017	Shea Ili	New Zealand	Wellington Saints	
2018	Reuben Te Rangi	New Zealand	Southland Sharks	

=== Grand Final MVP (2019–26) ===
Year	Player	Nationality	Team	Ref
2019	Thomas Abercrombie	New Zealand	Wellington Saints	
2020	Jordan Hunt	New Zealand	Otago Nuggets	
2021	Kerwin Roach	United States	Wellington Saints	
2022	Keith Williams	United States	Otago Nuggets	
2023	Tevin Brown	United States	Canterbury Rams	
2024	Lachlan Olbrich	Australia	Canterbury Rams	
2025	Hyrum Harris	New Zealand	Wellington Saints	
2026	Sam Timmins	New Zealand	Southland Sharks	

== See also ==
- List of National Basketball League (New Zealand) awards
