= Hyrum Harris =

New Zealand basketball player (born 1996)

No. 13 – Wellington Saints
- Position: Forward
- League: NZNBL

Personal information
- Born: 3 June 1996 (age 30) Auckland, New Zealand
- Listed height: 204 cm (6 ft 8 in)
- Listed weight: 110 kg (243 lb)

Career information
- High school: Fraser (Hamilton, New Zealand)
- College: Umpqua CC (2015–2016)
- NBA draft: 2018: undrafted
- Playing career: 2015–present

Career history
- 2015–2017: Super City Rangers
- 2018: Hawke's Bay Hawks
- 2019: Southland Sharks
- 2019–2020: Illawarra Hawks
- 2020: Manawatu Jets
- 2021: Cairns Taipans
- 2021–2023: Hawke's Bay Hawks
- 2021–2023: Adelaide 36ers
- 2023–2025: Perth Wildcats
- 2024–present: Wellington Saints
- 2025–2026: Kanazawa Samuraiz

Career highlights
- NZNBL champion (2025); NZNBL Grand Final MVP (2025); NZNBL Defensive Player of the Year (2025)

Hyrum Tipene Harris (born 3 June 1996) is a New Zealand professional basketball player for the Wellington Saints of the New Zealand National Basketball League (NZNBL).

== Early life ==
Harris was born in Auckland, New Zealand, and raised in Hamilton. He grew up playing soccer and rugby league.

== Professional career ==
=== NZNBL (2015–2019) ===
After playing for the Super City Rangers during the 2015 New Zealand NBL season, Harris relocated to the United States to play college basketball for the Umpqua Community College in Oregon during the 2015–16 season. He played for the Rangers in 2016 and 2017 before joining the Hawke's Bay Hawks in 2018. In 2019, Harris played for the Southland Sharks, where he averaged 11 points, 6.4 rebounds and 3.7 assists on an average of 26 minutes a game across 19 games that season.

=== Illawarra Hawks (2019–2020) ===
In September 2019, Harris joined the Illawarra Hawks of the Australian National Basketball League (NBL) as a development player. Across 16 games, Harris averaged 2.6 points and 1.4 rebounds across an average of 6.7 minutes per game, with a high of eight points and five rebounds against the Adelaide 36ers.

=== Manawatu Jets (2020) ===
After not being pre-selected for the NZNBL draft for the 2020 season, Harris was drafted by the Manawatu Jets. Despite missing a few games with injury, he finished the season leading the league with 2.7 steals per game, second in the league with 11.6 rebounds and 6.4 assists per game, whilst also averaging 15.1 points across 30.8 minutes per game.

=== Cairns Taipans (2021) ===
On 2 April 2021, Harris signed with the Cairns Taipans of the Australian NBL as an injury replacement player. He made just the one appearance for the Taipans during the 2020–21 NBL season.

=== Hawke's Bay Hawks and Adelaide 36ers (2021–2023) ===
Harris returned to the Hawke's Bay Hawks for the 2021 NZNBL season, scoring 18 points in the season opener against the Canterbury Rams on 2 May.

On 3 November 2021, Harris signed with the Adelaide 36ers for the 2021–22 NBL season. He was named the 36ers' Club Most Improved Player.

On 30 March 2022, Harris re-signed with the Hawks for the 2022 NZNBL season.

On 3 May 2022, Harris re-signed with the 36ers for the 2022–23 NBL season.

On 31 January 2023, Harris re-signed with the Hawks for the 2023 NZNBL season. He captained the Hawks and averaged 13.8 points, 9.3 rebounds, 4.1 assists, 1.7 steals and 1.1 blocks per game.

=== Perth Wildcats and Wellington Saints (2023–2025) ===
On 26 April 2023, Harris signed a two-year deal with the Perth Wildcats. On 15 February 2024, he scored a career-high 15 points in a 108–92 loss to the Illawarra Hawks. He averaged 5.8 points, 3.8 rebounds and 1.4 assists per game during the 2023–24 NBL season.

Harris joined the Wellington Saints for the 2024 New Zealand NBL season.

With the Wildcats in the 2024–25 NBL season, Harris averaged 10.9 minutes per game for a touch under three points and 2.2 rebounds.

Harris re-joined the Saints for the 2025 New Zealand NBL season. He was named the NZNBL Defensive Player of the Year. He helped the Saints reach the grand final, where he recorded 20 points and 14 rebounds in an 88–83 victory over the Southland Sharks to win his first NZNBL championship. He was subsequently named grand final MVP.

=== Kanazawa Samuraiz and Wellington Saints (2025–present) ===
On 27 June 2025, Harris signed with the Kanazawa Samuraiz of the Japanese B.League for the 2025–26 season.

In June 2026, Harris re-joined the Wellington Saints for the rest of the 2026 New Zealand NBL season. He missed the NZNBL grand final with an ankle injury.

== National team career ==
Harris debuted for the New Zealand Tall Blacks during the 2023 FIBA World Cup Asian qualifiers.

In July 2023, Harris was named in the Tall Blacks squad for the 2023 FIBA World Cup.

== Personal life ==
Harris is the son of Allies Evans and Reuben Harris.
