= DeAndre Daniels =

American basketball player (born 1992)

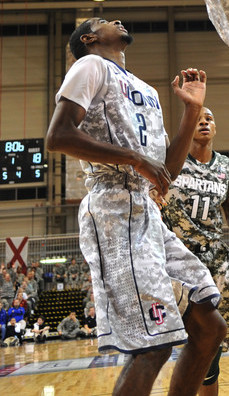
- Daniels with UConn in 2012

No. 27 – CD Español de Osorno
- Position: Small forward
- League: LNB

Personal information
- Born: April 15, 1992 (age 34) Woodland Hills, California, U.S.
- Listed height: 6 ft 9 in (2.06 m)
- Listed weight: 210 lb (95 kg)

Career information
- High school: Taft (Woodland Hills, California); IMG Academy (Bradenton, Florida)
- College: UConn (2011–2014)
- NBA draft: 2014: 2nd round, 37th overall pick
- Drafted by: Toronto Raptors
- Playing career: 2014–present

Career history
- 2014–2015: Perth Wildcats
- 2016: Raptors 905
- 2016–2017: Dinamica Mantova
- 2017: Erie BayHawks
- 2017: Maine Red Claws
- 2018: Agua Caliente Clippers
- 2018: Spartak Primorye
- 2019: Texas Legends
- 2019: Cañeros del Este
- 2019–2020: KTP Basket
- 2021: Manawatu Jets
- 2022: Townsville Heat
- 2023: CD Español de Osorno
- 2024: Paisas Basketball
- 2025: Argentino de Junín
- 2025–present: CD Español de Osorno

Career highlights
- NZNBL blocks leader (2021); NCAA champion (2014)
- Stats at Basketball Reference

DeAndre Martise Daniels (born April 15, 1992) is an American professional basketball player for the CD Español de Osorno of the Liga Nacional de Básquetbol de Chile (LNB). He played college basketball for the UConn Huskies, where he won a national championship and made the NCAA Final Four All-Tournament team in 2014.

A 6'9" small forward from Los Angeles, Daniels surprised recruiting experts by choosing defending champion Connecticut out of IMG Academy – despite never visiting the East Coast school. Daniels stuck with the Huskies even after the school was declared ineligible for the postseason in 2012–13 due to poor Academic Progress Rate performance. He was selected by the Toronto Raptors with the 37th overall pick in the 2014 NBA draft.

== High school career ==
Daniels attended Taft High School in Woodland Hills, California, before completing a postgraduate year at IMG Academy in 2010–11. Daniels originally had committed to the University of Texas, but decommitted and committed to the University of Connecticut.

Considered a five-star recruit by Rivals.com, Daniels was listed as the No. 3 small forward and the No. 10 player in the nation in 2011.

== College career ==
As a freshman in 2011–12, Daniels averaged 3.0 points and 2.1 rebounds per game as a part-time starter. In his sophomore season, he started every game and raised his averages to 12.1 points and 5.1 rebounds per game as the Huskies sat out their postseason ban. In his junior season, he again improved his production to 13.2 points and 6.0 rebounds. Daniels played a key role in getting the Huskies to the 2014 NCAA Final Four. He was named to the NCAA All-Tournament East Region Team and then recorded 20 points and 10 rebounds in leading the Huskies past the top overall seed Florida Gators in the national semi-final.

On April 25, 2014, Daniels declared for the NBA draft, forgoing his final year of college eligibility.

== Professional career ==
=== Perth Wildcats (2014–2015) ===
On June 26, 2014, Daniels was selected with the 37th overall pick in the 2014 NBA draft by the Toronto Raptors. He later joined the Raptors for the 2014 NBA Summer League, where he averaged 10.0 points and 6.2 rebounds in five games.

On August 14, 2014, Daniels signed with the Perth Wildcats for the 2014–15 NBL season. He made his debut for the Wildcats in the team's season-opening loss to the New Zealand Breakers, scoring 19 points. He was named Player of the Week for Round 8 after scoring a then season-high 22 points against the Cairns Taipans on November 28. On February 15, 2015, he tied a season high with 24 points in a double-overtime loss to the Breakers. In the regular-season finale against the Townsville Crocodiles a week later, Daniels had another 24-point game including six triples to go with 11 rebounds. The Wildcats lost 2–0 in the semi-finals to the Taipans. In 30 games for the Wildcats, Daniels averaged 14.8 points, 7.7 rebounds, 1.2 assists and 1.1 blocks per game. His 232 total rebounds led the league in that category.

=== Raptors 905 (2015–2016) ===
In May 2015, Daniels returned to Toronto to begin training with the hopes of joining the Raptors in 2015–16. However, a Jones fracture suffered in his right foot in early July delayed his off-season preparation and forced him out of the 2015 NBA Summer League and the first half of the 2015–16 season. On January 5, 2016, he was acquired by Raptors 905, Toronto's D-League affiliate. He made his long-awaited D-League debut on March 12 against the Iowa Energy, recording two points, six rebounds and one assist. He appeared in eight games and made five starts for the Raptors 905 to finish the season.

In July 2016, Daniels re-joined the Toronto Raptors for the 2016 NBA Summer League.

=== Italy (2016–2017) ===
On September 12, 2016, Daniels signed with Dinamica Mantova of the Italian Serie A2 Citroën. In 35 games for Mantova, he averaged 13.0 points, 6.6 rebounds and 1.1 blocks per game.

=== NBA G League and Russia (2017–2019) ===
In July 2017, Daniels joined the Portland Trail Blazers for the 2017 NBA Summer League.

In October 2017, Daniels joined the Erie BayHawks of the NBA G League. He appeared in three games with the BayHawks. On December 8, he was acquired by the Maine Red Claws. He was waived ten days later. On January 23, 2018, he was acquired by the Agua Caliente Clippers to finish the season.

Daniels started the 2018–19 season in Russia with Spartak Primorye, playing five games. On February 5, 2019, he was acquired by the Texas Legends.

=== Dominican Republic and Finland (2019–2021) ===
In September 2019, Daniels had a three-game stint in the Dominican Republic with Caneros Del Este. He later joined KTP Basket of the Finnish Korisliiga for the 2019–20 season. He returned to KTP Basket for the 2020–21 season, but left in late December 2020.

=== New Zealand (2021) ===
On March 10, 2021, Daniels signed with the Manawatu Jets for the 2021 New Zealand NBL season. In 16 games, he averaged 16.4 points, 8.6 rebounds and 2.3 blocks per game.

=== Townsville Heat (2022) ===
In February 2022, Daniels signed with the Townsville Heat for the 2022 NBL1 North season.

== Personal ==
Daniels is the son of Laron Daniels and Kiljuana Thorpe. Father to Damian Daniels.
