= Kerwin Roach =

American basketball player (born 1996)

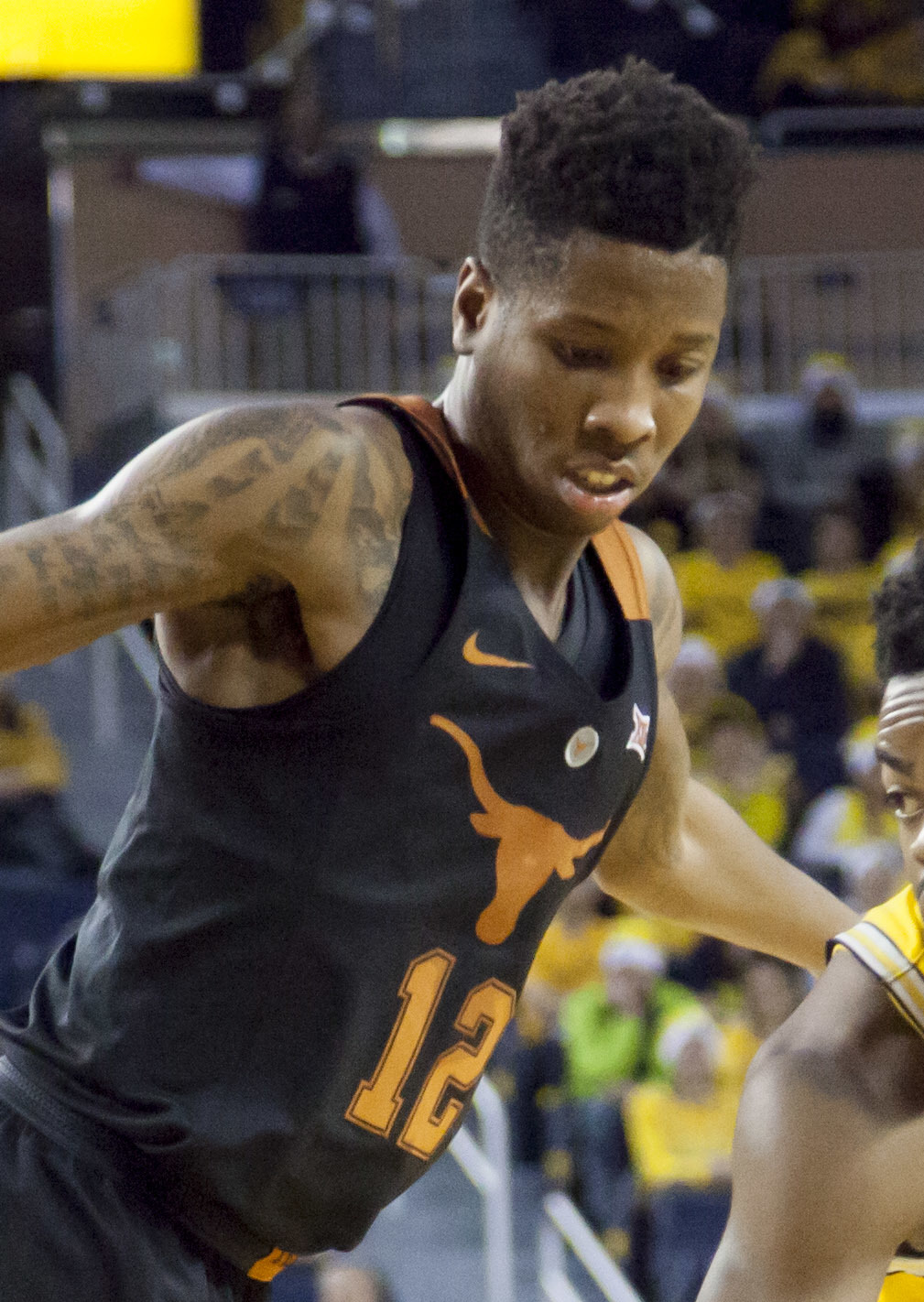
- Roach with the Texas Longhorns in 2016

No. 1 – Al-Muharraq
- Position: Shooting guard
- League: Bahraini Premier League

Personal information
- Born: October 24, 1996 (age 30) Houston, Texas, U.S.
- Listed height: 6 ft 5 in (1.96 m)
- Listed weight: 185 lb (84 kg)

Career information
- High school: North Shore (Cloverleaf, Texas)
- College: Texas (2015–2019)
- NBA draft: 2019: undrafted
- Playing career: 2019–present

Career history
- 2019–2020: Rio Grande Valley Vipers
- 2021: Wellington Saints
- 2021–2022: Windy City Bulls
- 2022: Al-Ahli
- 2022: Marineros de Puerto Plata
- 2022–2023: Sagesse SC
- 2023: Al-Nasr
- 2023–2024: Al-Hashd
- 2024–2025: CS Antonine
- 2025–present: Al-Muharraq

Career highlights
- NZNBL champion (2021); NZNBL Grand Final MVP (2021); NIT champion (2019); Big 12 All-Newcomer Team (2016)

Kerwin LaTroy Roach II (born October 24, 1996) is an American professional basketball player for Al-Muharraq of the Bahraini Premier League. He played college basketball for the Texas Longhorns.

== High school career ==
Roach attended North Shore High School. He was considered a 4-star prospect and ranked the 21st best shooting guard and 71st overall prospect in his high school class. Roach committed to Texas, spurning offers from California and Wichita State. He was also a track and field star at North Shore, reaching 50 feet, 8 inches in the triple jump.

== College career ==
Roach was named to the Big 12 Conference All-Newcomer Team. Roach averaged 7.5 points per game as a freshman. He was suspended for the first game of his sophomore year. As a sophomore, Roach averaged 9.9 points per game on an 11–22 team. Roach was an important contributor for Texas as a junior, taking an important role on offense with guard Andrew Jones lost for much of the season with leukemia. Roach had his own health issues to deal with, playing most of the conference season with a broken hand. He averaged 12.3 points, 3.7 rebounds, 3.6 assists, and 1.5 steals per game. Roach improved his shooting to 43.8 percent from the field and 36.4 percent from three and was an Honorable Mention All-Big 12 selection. Roach lost a tooth in a Big 12 tournament matchup with Iowa State but continued to play and finished with 9 points, 6 rebounds and a team-high 7 assists in the win. In the NCAA Tournament, Roach scored a career-high 26 points in an 87–83 overtime loss to seventh-seeded Nevada. After the season Roach flirted with the NBA draft, but ultimately decided to come back to Texas.

He suffered a torn meniscus in his right knee on August 2, 2018, at the CP3 Elite Guard Camp which required surgery. Roach was suspended for the team's season opener for violating team rules. He was suspended again for violating team rules on February 22, 2019. He was sidelined for five games before returning in the Big 12 Tournament against Kansas on March 14. Roach averaged 14.6 points, 4.3 rebounds, 3.2 assists and 1.2 steals per game as a senior.

== Professional career ==
After going undrafted in the 2019 NBA draft, Roach joined the Charlotte Hornets for the 2019 NBA Summer League. He did not play in a game for them.

On July 27, 2019, Roach signed his first professional contract with BC Körmend of the NB I/A and the FIBA Europe Cup. However, he left the team without appearing in a game. He was later named to the training camp roster for the Rio Grande Valley Vipers of the NBA G League. On November 30, Roach finished with 22 points, five rebounds, four assists, two blocks and two steals in a win over the South Bay Lakers.

On January 20, 2021, Roach signed with the Wellington Saints for the 2021 New Zealand NBL season.

Roach joined the Los Angeles Clippers for the 2021 NBA Summer League. In five games, he recorded 7.4 points per game, 1.0 assists per game, and 1.8 rebounds per game.

On August 26, 2021, he has signed with Ironi Ness Ziona of the Israeli Basketball Super League (IBSL).

Roach was selected with the 25th pick of the third round of the 2021 NBA G League draft by the Windy City Bulls.

On August 3, 2024, Roach signed with CS Antonine of the Lebanese Basketball League.

== Career statistics ==
Legend
GP	Games played	GS	Games started	MPG	Minutes per game
FG%	Field goal percentage	3P%	3-point field goal percentage	FT%	Free throw percentage
RPG	Rebounds per game	APG	Assists per game	SPG	Steals per game
BPG	Blocks per game	PPG	Points per game	**Bold**	Career high

=== College ===
Year	Team	GP	GS	MPG	FG%	3P%	FT%	RPG	APG	SPG	BPG	PPG
2015–16	Texas	**33**	0	18.0	**.453**	.328	.629	2.9	1.2	.9	**.3**	7.5
2016–17	Texas	32	**31**	30.0	.398	.284	.630	3.9	**3.7**	**1.6**	.2	9.9
2017–18	Texas	32	**31**	**33.4**	.438	**.364**	.651	3.7	3.6	1.5	**.3**	12.3
2018–19	Texas	31	24	29.2	.439	.355	**.688**	**4.3**	3.2	1.2	**.3**	**14.6**
Career		128	86	27.6	.431	.341	.649	3.7	2.9	1.3	.3	11.0
