= Ross McMains =

American-born New Zealand basketball coach (born 1989)

Boston Celtics
- Position: Assistant coach
- League: NBA

Personal information
- Born: March 29, 1989 (age 37) New Hampshire, U.S.

Career information
- Coaching career: 2013–present

Career history

Coaching
- 2013–2015: Reno Bighorns (assistant)
- 2016: Taranaki Mountainairs
- 2016–2017: Santa Cruz Warriors (assistant)
- 2017–2018: Westchester Knicks (assistant)
- 2019–2020: Melbourne United (assistant)
- 2021–2022: Louisville Cardinals (assistant)
- 2022–2023: Maine Red Claws (assistant)
- 2024–present: Boston Celtics (assistant)

Career highlights
- NZNBL Coach of the Year (2016)

Fraser Ross McMains (born March 29, 1989) is an American-born New Zealand basketball coach. He is currently a player development coach with the Boston Celtics of the National Basketball Association (NBA).

== Early life and career ==
McMains was born in New Hampshire in the United States before growing up in New Zealand on Waiheke Island. He attended Kadimah College in Auckland, having to take the boat to school every day. He returned to the U.S. at age 11 when his family moved to Santa Barbara. There he went to Santa Barbara High School. After high school, he returned to New Zealand and got a job working with the New Zealand Breakers organisation in 2007. A year or so later, he returned to the U.S. and started in player development, working with a mix of pro players in Los Angeles. That led to an opportunity to work with players in Latvia, France, and China. He also ran NBA Pre-Draft Preparation for two years in Santa Barbara, while also running off-season workouts for a selection of NBA and international players. During this time, he studied at Santa Monica College (2008–10) and John Cabot University (2011) in Rome, Italy. He was exposed to European basketball while in Rome.

== Coaching career ==
McMains served as a player development coach with the Sacramento Kings in the 2012–13 NBA season. He then served as an assistant coach with the Reno Bighorns of the NBA Development League in 2013–14 and 2014–15.

McMains returned to New Zealand in 2015 and was named assistant coach for the New Zealand Tall Blacks. He went on to win the New Zealand NBL Coach of the Year Award as head coach of the Taranaki Mountainairs in the 2016 New Zealand NBL season.

McMains was an assistant coach with the Santa Cruz Warriors during the 2016–17 NBA Development League season and an assistant coach with the Westchester Knicks during the 2017–18 NBA G League season. He joined the New York Knicks for the 2018–19 season as head video coordinator.

In August 2019, McMains was appointed an assistant coach with Melbourne United of the Australian NBL. He parted ways with Melbourne in August 2020.

In May 2021, McMains was appointed an assistant coach with the Louisville Cardinals men's college basketball team.

For the 2022–23 season, McMains served as the associate head coach of the Maine Red Claws of the NBA G League.

For the 2023–24 season, McMains joined the Boston Celtics in a player development role. He contributed to the Celtics' 2023–24 NBA championship. For the 2024–25 season, McMains was elevated to an assistant coach of the Celtics.

As of July 2023, McMains was still an assistant coach for the New Zealand Tall Blacks.
