= Brent Matehaere =

New Zealand basketball player and coach

Personal information
- Born: 1969 (age 56–57)

Career information
- High school: St John's College (Hamilton, New Zealand)
- Playing career: 1990–1992
- Coaching career: 2010–present

Career history

Playing
- 1990–1992: Otago Nuggets

Coaching
- 2010–2013: Otago Gold Rush
- 2020–2024: Otago Nuggets

Career highlights
- 2× NBL champion (2020, 2022); NBL Coach of the Year (2020); WBC champion (2011); WBC Coach of the Year (2011)

Brent Matehaere (born c. 1969) is a New Zealand basketball coach and former player who most recently served as head coach of the Otago Nuggets in the National Basketball League (NBL).

== Early life ==
Matehaere grew up in Hamilton and attended St John's College, graduating in 1987. He attended the University of Otago where he completed teaching studies.

== Playing career ==
Matehaere was a foundation player when the Otago Nuggets entered the National Basketball League (NBL) in 1990. He played for the Nuggets in 1990, 1991 and 1992.

In 1997, Matehaere was a member of the Kaikorai Rugby Football Club that won the Dunedin club final over Southern RFC.

== Coaching career ==
Between 2010 and 2013, Matehaere served as head coach of the Otago Gold Rush in the Women's Basketball Championship (WBC). In 2011, he guided the Gold Rush to the championship and won the WBC Coach of the Year. In 2013, he was named the recipient of the Service to Women's Basketball award.

Matehaere coached the New Zealand Junior Tall Ferns between 2012 and 2016. He also coached the senior national team in 2016 on their tour of China before the Olympic Qualifying Tournament.

In November 2019, Matehaere was named head coach of the Otago Nuggets for their return season in the NBL in 2021. However, COVID-19 saw a revamped 2020 competition which presented Otago with an opportunity to re-enter the league a year earlier. He went on to guide the Nuggets to the championship and won the NBL Coach of the Year.

In February 2021, Matehaere was re-appointed head coach of the Nuggets for the 2021 season. The Nuggets went on to miss the finals.

In March 2022, Matehaere was re-appointed head coach of the Nuggets for the 2022 season. He went on to lead the Nuggets to their second championship in three years with a win over the Auckland Tuatara in the final.

In January 2023, Matehaere re-signed with the Nuggets for two more seasons. The Nuggets parted ways with him in November 2024. His 53–41 win-loss record (56.4%) saw him finish behind only Carl Dickel (60.8%) for highest winning percentage with the Nuggets.

== Personal life ==
Matehaere's daughter Hannah was a junior basketball player in Otago. Another of his daughters Lucy has been a member of New Zealand canoeing squads.

In October 2021, Matehaere left his teaching job at Otago Boys' High School after 22 years to take up the role of Otago-Southland club development officer for Surf Life Saving New Zealand.
