= Brendon Timmins =

New Zealand rugby union player (born 1970)

- Full name: Brendon Paul Timmins
- Born: 22 August 1970 (age 56) Dannevirke, New Zealand
- University: University of Otago

Rugby union career
- Position: Lock
Provincial / State sides
Years	Team	Apps	(Points)
1992–99	Otago	74	(30)
2000–02	Southland	24	(20)
Super Rugby
Years	Team	Apps	(Points)
1996–02	Highlanders	42	(15)

Brendon Paul Timmins (born 22 August 1970 in Dannevirke) is a New Zealand former professional rugby union player.

A lock, Timmins was a New Zealand Universities representative player during the early 1990s and captained the side to victory against Fiji in 1994. At club level, Timmins represented Dunedin-based teams Otago University and Zingari-Richmond, and also Invercargill's Eastern Hawks (now Pirates Oldboys).

Timmins competed for the Highlanders between 1996 and 2002, making 42 Super 12 appearances, including the 1999 final loss to the Crusaders. At provincial level, Timmins played 74 games for Otago and captained Southland for two seasons, before coaching professional rugby in Japan.

Since retiring from rugby, Timmins has continued in sport, competing in the New Zealand Masters Games at both basketball and waka ama. During his time at the University of Otago, Timmins completed a degree and postgraduate diploma in Physical Education Teaching and Coaching. He is currently a Principal Lecturer and the Acting Head of School for the Institute of Sport, Exercise and Health at Otago Polytechnic.

Timmins is the father of basketball player Sam Timmins.
