= 2020 New Zealand NBL season =

- League: New Zealand NBL
- Sport: Basketball
- Duration: 23 June – 1 August
- Games: 14
- Teams: 7

Regular season
- Minor premiers: Otago Nuggets
- Season MVP: Tom Vodanovich (Manawatu Jets)
- Top scorer: Derone Raukawa (Taranaki Mountainairs)

Finals
- Champions: Otago Nuggets
- Runners-up: Manawatu Jets
- Grand Final MVP: Jordan Hunt

New Zealand NBL seasons
- ← 2019 2021 →

The 2020 NBL season (officially known as the 2020 NBL Showdown) was the 39th season of the National Basketball League.

The regular season was set to commence on Thursday 9 April and end on Sunday 12 July, with the finals then taking place between 16–24 July. However, following the coronavirus outbreak in early to mid March 2020, the season was suspended indefinitely. After two months of deliberation and in the wake of easing coronavirus restrictions, the league announced a revised competition format for 2020 beginning on Tuesday 23 June and ending with the grand final on Saturday 1 August.

The 2020 season was initially set to feature eight teams following the withdrawal of the Southern Huskies and Super City Rangers and the inclusion of the Franklin Bulls for the first time. However, three of the top four teams in 2019 (Wellington Saints, Hawke's Bay Hawks and Southland Sharks) decided not to enter the modified competition. This left the door open for the inclusion of the Otago Nuggets, a team who were looking to re-enter the league in 2021 for the first time since 2014, and the Huskies. Coinciding with the announcement of a revised 2020 competition, the Huskies franchise relocated from Tasmania to Auckland and became the Auckland Huskies.

The 2020 season began on 23 June, with all seven teams playing up to three games per week over six weeks. The season concluded on 1 August with the Otago Nuggets defeating the Manawatu Jets in the grand final to win their maiden NBL championship. All teams were based in Auckland, with all games played out of The Trusts Arena.

== Team information ==
Team	City origin	Arena	Colours	Head coach
Auckland Huskies	Auckland	The Trusts Arena, Auckland		(United States) Kevin Braswell
Canterbury Rams	Christchurch	The Trusts Arena, Auckland		(Australia) Mick Downer
Franklin Bulls	Auckland	The Trusts Arena, Auckland		(Australia) Liam Simmons
Manawatu Jets	Palmerston North	The Trusts Arena, Auckland		(New Zealand) Tim McTamney
Nelson Giants	Nelson	The Trusts Arena, Auckland		(New Zealand) Michael Fitchett
Otago Nuggets	Dunedin	The Trusts Arena, Auckland		(New Zealand) Brent Matehaere
Taranaki Mountainairs	New Plymouth	The Trusts Arena, Auckland		(New Zealand) Doug Courtney

== Summary ==
=== Regular season standings ===
Pos	Team	W	L	PF	PA	PD	Pts	Qualification
1	Otago Nuggets	9	5	1293	1233	+60	18	Qualifying Final
2	Manawatu Jets	8	6	1346	1305	+41	16 (Note: Head-to-head results: Manawatu 4–0, Auckland 2–2, Taranaki 0–4)	Qualifying Final
3	Auckland Huskies	8	6	1207	1219	−12	16	Elimination Final 2 and 3
4	Taranaki Mountainairs	8	6	1382	1375	+7	16	Elimination Final 2 and 3
5	Franklin Bulls	7	7	1150	1134	+16	14	Elimination Final 2 and 3
6	Nelson Giants	5	9	1171	1252	−81	10	Elimination Final 1
7	Canterbury Rams	4	10	1201	1232	−31	8	Elimination Final 1

Source: New Zealand National Basketball League
Rules for classification: 1) Points; 2) Head-to-head results; 3) Points difference; 4) Points scored.

=== Finals ===
Tuesday 28 July

- Elimination Final 1 – 6th vs 7th

5:30 pm

Box score
Report

Nelson Giants 89, Canterbury Rams 93
Scoring by quarter: 30–26, 17–23, 19–27, 23–17
Pts: Mike Karena 19; Rebs: Mika Vukona 16; Asts: Karena, Trathen 3 each	Pts: Quintin Bailey 19; Rebs: Bailey, Britt 8 each Asts: Taylor Britt 7
Canterbury advances to Elimination Final 2

The Trusts Arena, Auckland

- Qualifying Final – 1st vs 2nd

7:30 pm

Box score
Report

Otago Nuggets 105, Manawatu Jets 80
Scoring by quarter: 30–19, 23–16, 27–17, 25–28
Pts: Jordan Hunt 23; Rebs: Kane Keil 12; Asts: Jordan Ngatai 6	Pts: Taane Samuel 17; Rebs: 3 players 6 each Asts: Hyrum Harris 4

The Trusts Arena, Auckland

Wednesday 29 July

- Elimination Final 2 – 3rd vs Winner EF1

5:30 pm

Box score
Report

Auckland Huskies 84, Canterbury Rams 98
Scoring by quarter: 26–23, 16–13, 20–39, 22–23
Pts: Izayah Mauriohooho-Le'afa 39; Rebs: Bailey-Nowell, Henry 8 each Asts: Izayah Mauriohooho-Le'afa 5	Pts: Thomas Webley 21; Rebs: Toby Gillooly 12; Asts: Taylor Britt 10
Canterbury advances to Semi Final 1

The Trusts Arena, Auckland

- Elimination Final 3 – 4th vs 5th

7:30 pm

Box score
Report

Taranaki Mountainairs 99, Franklin Bulls 90
Scoring by quarter: 26–18, 22–27, 24–19, 27–26
Pts: Marcel Jones 31; Rebs: Marcel Jones 10; Asts: Raukawa, Jones 7 each	Pts: Dominique Kelman-Poto 31; Rebs: Dominique Kelman-Poto 10; Asts: Everard Bartlett 5
Taranaki advances to Semi Final 2

The Trusts Arena, Auckland

Thursday 30 July

- Semi Final 1 – Winner QF vs Lowest EF Winner

5:30 pm

Box score
Report

Otago Nuggets 97, Canterbury Rams 79
Scoring by quarter: 29–22, 25–17, 27–18, 16–22
Pts: Jordan Hunt 33; Rebs: Jordan Hunt 11; Asts: Kenny, Ngatai 7 each	Pts: Samuel Smith 13; Rebs: Talma, Webley 7 each Asts: Taylor Britt 5
Otago advances to Grand Final

The Trusts Arena, Auckland

- Semi Final 2 – Loser QF vs Highest EF Winner

7:30 pm

Box score
Report

Manawatu Jets 105, Taranaki Mountainairs 95
Scoring by quarter: 34–23, 21–27, 12–20, 38–25
Pts: Tom Vodanovich 28; Rebs: Hyrum Harris 11; Asts: Hyrum Harris 7	Pts: Derone Raukawa 32; Rebs: Marcel Jones 12; Asts: Marcel Jones 6
Manawatu advances to Grand Final

The Trusts Arena, Auckland

Saturday 1 August

- Grand Final – Winner SF1 vs Winner SF2

7:30 pm

Preview
Box score
Report

Otago Nuggets 79, Manawatu Jets 77
Scoring by quarter: 15–17, 22–24, 15–14, 27–22
Pts: Jordan Hunt 21; Rebs: 3 players 7 each Asts: Jarrod Kenny 8	Pts: Tom Vodanovich 24; Rebs: Hyrum Harris 12; Asts: Harris, Samuel 4 each
Otago wins NBL championship

The Trusts Arena, Auckland

== Awards ==
=== Statistics leaders ===
Stats as of the end of the regular season

Category	Player	Team	Stat
Points per game	Derone Raukawa	Taranaki Mountainairs	22.8
Rebounds per game	Marcel Jones	Taranaki Mountainairs	13.4
Assists per game	Derone Raukawa	Taranaki Mountainairs	7.6
Steals per game	Izayah Mauriohooho-Le'afa	Auckland Huskies	2.7
Blocks per game	Sam Timmins	Franklin Bulls	1.9

=== Regular season ===
- Most Valuable Player: Tom Vodanovich (Manawatu Jets)
- Defensive Player of the Year: Jarrod Kenny (Otago Nuggets) and Izayah Mauriohooho-Le'afa (Auckland Huskies)
- Youth Player of the Year: Taane Samuel (Manawatu Jets)
- Coach of the Year: Brent Matehaere (Otago Nuggets)
- All-Star Five:
  - G: Derone Raukawa (Taranaki Mountainairs)
  - G: Izayah Mauriohooho-Le'afa (Auckland Huskies)
  - F: Jordan Ngatai (Otago Nuggets)
  - F: Marcel Jones (Taranaki Mountainairs)
  - C: Tom Vodanovich (Manawatu Jets)

=== Finals ===
- Grand Final MVP: Jordan Hunt (Otago Nuggets)
