= New Zealand men's national basketball team =

Men's national basketball team representing New Zealand

New Zealand
- FIBA ranking: 25 (1 September 2026)
- Joined FIBA: 1951
- FIBA zone: FIBA Asia
- National federation: Basketball New Zealand
- Coach: Judd Flavell
- Nickname: Tall Blacks

Olympic Games
- Appearances: 2

FIBA World Cup
- Appearances: 7

FIBA Asia Cup
- Appearances: 3
- Medals: (bronze) Bronze: (2022)

FIBA Oceania Championship
- Appearances: 22
- Medals: (gold) Gold: (1999, 2001, 2009); (silver) Silver: (1971, 1975, 1978, 1979, 1981, 1983, 1985, 1987, 1989, 1991, 1993, 1995, 1997, 2003, 2005, 2007, 2011, 2013, 2015)
Home	Away

First international
- New Zealand 72–64 Singapore (Singapore; 1 September 1962)

Biggest win
- New Zealand 136–41 New Caledonia (Wellington, New Zealand; 1 September 1997)

Biggest defeat
- New Zealand 59–115 Australia (Christchurch, New Zealand; 4 September 1987)

The New Zealand men's national basketball team (Māori: Te kapa poitūkohu o Aotearoa) represents New Zealand in international basketball competitions. The team is governed by Basketball New Zealand. The team's official nickname is the Tall Blacks (Māori: Pango Tāroaroa).

Over their history, New Zealand have won three FIBA Oceania Championships, made seven appearances at the FIBA World Cup and two at the Olympic Games. Since 2017, the team has made three appearances at the FIBA Asia Cup, with their best effort resulting in a bronze medal finish in 2022.

== Haka ==
Prior to games, the Tall Blacks perform a haka. The team's current haka, Tu Kaha O Pango Te Kahikatea, was composed and created in 2006 by Don Hutana and former Tall Black Paora Winitana. It tells the story of how the Tall Blacks overcome great odds and challenges through their adventures. It also draws from the story of Tāne and how he overcame adversity to gain the three baskets of knowledge.

== History ==
=== Inaugural year ===
The Tall Blacks' first game was played against Singapore on 1 September 1962. That year, they played a further eight games in Asia against Malaysia, Thailand, Philippines, Taiwan, and Hong Kong.

=== 1970s ===
In 1970, New Zealand hosted the world number 6 Czechoslovakia for a test series. The Tall Blacks lost both games, 115–60 and 118–62.

In 1971, New Zealand hosted the first FIBA Oceania Championship. The Oceania qualification zone was created by FIBA so Australia and New Zealand could compete every two years to decide which country would represent the zone at the Olympic Games or the world championships. The Tall Blacks lost the inaugural series 0–3.

In 1974, New Zealand played against Australia, the Philippines and Tahiti. They split the series 2–2, with both wins coming against Tahiti.

In the 1975 FIBA Oceania Championship, the Tall Blacks lost 0–3 to Australia.

In the 1978 FIBA Oceania Championship, the Tall Blacks recorded their first win against Australia, 67–65. They lost the series 1–2. That same year, the Tall Blacks won the silver medal at the Commonwealth championships in Britain.

In the 1979 FIBA Oceania Championship, the Tall Blacks again lost 0–3 to Australia.

=== 1980s ===
The Tall Blacks participated in the William Jones Cup in 1980, 1981 and 1982.

In 1983, they participated in the Kirin Invitational and Taiwan Tournament. That same year, New Zealand hosted the Commonwealth Basketball Championships (men's and women's). Both teams finished without medals, and the New Zealand Basketball Federation (NZBF), hoping to make a profit, suffered a $50,000 loss.

The Tall Blacks gained a wild card entry to the 1986 FIBA World Championship in Spain. They managed one win against Malaysia to finish 21st in the 24-team tournament. Stan Hill announced his retirement following the tournament after 131 games.

In 1987, Russia played a two-match series against the Tall Blacks in New Zealand. The Tall Blacks lost both games. That same year, New Zealand finished second in the Oceania series, beating French Polynesia and losing to Australia.

=== 1990s ===
Throughout the 1990s, the Tall Blacks were invited to a number of tournaments:

- 1994 Tour of Japan won the series 4–2
- 1997 Harlem Basketball Tournament, Netherlands
- 1997 Portugal and Madrid Xmas Tournaments, Europe
- 1998 Anhui Tournament, China
- 1998 Nanjing Tournament, China
- 1998 Ningbo Tournament, China
- 1998 Heife Tournament, China

New Zealand also hosted Japan (won series 3–0, 1991), Croatia (lost series 0–1, 1997) and Canada (tied series 1–1, 1998).

In 1997, New Caledonia joined the Tall Blacks and Australia for the Oceania Championship that was held in New Zealand. It was in this tournament that the Tall Blacks registered their largest ever win margin and score, defeating New Caledonia 136–41. However, they lost to Australia in pool play and the final to once again miss out on the 1998 World Championships.

The Tall Blacks returned to Taiwan for the 1999 William Jones Cup, finishing third after going 5–3. The 1999 FIBA Oceania Championship was a one-off game between the Tall Blacks and Guam, with New Zealand winning 125–43 and qualifying for the Olympic Games for the first time. Future NBA players Kirk Penney and Sean Marks debuted for the Tall Blacks in 1999.

=== 2000s ===
In 2000, the Tall Blacks participated in the Slam Down Under tournament in Sydney in June, the William Jones Cup in Taiwan in July, and the Summer Olympics in September. In their first ever Olympic appearance, the Tall Blacks were placed in Group A alongside the United States, Italy, China, Latvia and France. They finished 11th with a 1–6 record, picking up their first Olympic win against Angola (70–60). Sean Marks finished the tournament second in rebounds (7.3 per game) and Pero Cameron finished the tournament second in steals (1.7 per game).

In 2001, the Tall Blacks participated in the Goodwill Games in Brisbane. Kirk Penney averaged a team-leading 14.8 points as New Zealand finished sixth. In the FIBA Oceania Championship, the Tall Blacks won the first fixture of the three-game series against Australia 85–78 but lost the second game 81–79 in overtime. In the third game, New Zealand made history with an 89–78 win, beating Australia 2–1 to qualify for the 2002 FIBA World Championship in Indianapolis.

The Tall Blacks had a prolonged Europe tour prior to the 2002 FIBA World Championship that included a victory over world champs Yugoslavia. They entered the World Championship with a level of confidence under coach Tab Baldwin. The team had Sean Marks and Pero Cameron in career-best form alongside two world-class sharpshooters in Phill Jones and Kirk Penney. There was also Mark Dickel, Paul Henare, Ed Book and Dillon Boucher. The Tall Blacks pushed into the second round after beating China, Venezuela and Russia. Losses came at the hands of the United States, Argentina and Germany in Group D. In the quarter-finals, they beat Puerto Rico 65–63 to earn a spot in the semi-final against Yugoslavia. They went on to lose 89–78 to Yugoslavia and then lost 117–94 to Germany in the bronze medal match. Fourth place is still the team's best finish at a World Cup / World Championship as of 2022. Cameron was named to the All-Tournament team and Jones finished the tournament as its ninth-leading scorer with 18.2 points per game.

In 2003, the Tall Blacks participated in the Efes Pilsen World Cup in Turkey and lost 0–3 to Australia in the FIBA Oceania Championship. The Oceania series determined seedings for the 2004 Athens Olympics.

In the lead up to the Olympics, the Tall Blacks had a series against Australia and then toured the U.S. and Europe. They finished the Athens Olympics with a 1–5 record in group A against Italy, China, Serbia and Montenegro, Argentina and Spain. In the play-off for 9th position they lost to Australia 98–80, finishing 10th. Phill Jones' 21 points per game left him as the Games' second-leading scorer behind Pau Gasol of Spain.

In 2005, the Tall Blacks won the Shuang Feng Cup in China and participated in the inaugural Gaze Cup in Australia. In the FIBA Oceania Championship, they lost 0–3 to Australia.

At the 2006 Commonwealth Games, the Tall Blacks reached the gold medal game, where they lost 81–76 to Australia. Later that year at the FIBA World Championship, New Zealand were considered a long shot for a medal following the retirements of Sean Marks and Ed Book. They were on the verge of not advancing out of the first round after losing its first three games and being down 18 points at halftime to Japan in the fourth game. They came back to win that game 60–57 and beat Panama to advance to the second round, where they lost to the reigning Olympic champions, Argentina. Tab Baldwin subsequently resigned as the head coach of the Tall Blacks, replaced by then assistant coach Nenad Vučinić.

In 2007, the Tall Blacks went 2–3 at the Stanković Cup and went 1–2 at the FIBA Oceania Championship against Australia.

In 2008, the Tall Blacks went 0–2 against Australia in the Al Ramsay Shield series in Melbourne and 2–1 at the Jack Donohue International Classic tournament in Toronto. At the Olympic qualifying tournament, the team reached the quarterfinal, where they lost to Greece and subsequently missed the Beijing Olympics.

In the 2009 FIBA Oceania Championship, the Tall Blacks defeated Australia on aggregate, winning game two 100–78.

=== 2010s ===
At the 2010 FIBA World Championship, the Tall Blacks lost in the round of 16. It saw them drop five places to 18th in the FIBA world rankings.

In 2011, the Tall Blacks won the Stanković Cup in China after beating Russia in the final. Kirk Penney and Thomas Abercrombie named in the tournament All-Star five. At the FIBA Oceania Championship, the team lost 0–3 to Australia.

In the lead up to the 2012 Olympic Qualifying Tournament, the Tall Blacks suffered heavy defeats in Brazil without injured duo Penney and Abercrombie. They went on to finish 10th in the Olympic Qualifying Tournament.

In the 2013 FIBA Oceania Championship, the Tall Blacks lost 0–2 to Australia. They went on to reach the final 16 of the 2014 FIBA Basketball World Cup. After this tournament, Penney, Casey Frank and coach Vucinic retired from international basketball.

In 2015, the Tall Blacks had a European tour under new head coach Paul Henare. They went on to win the Stanković Cup and lose 0–2 to Australia in the FIBA Oceania Championship.

In 2016, the Tall Blacks finished third at the Atlas Challenge in China. They also had a European tour. At the Olympic Qualifying Tournament, they finished third.

At the 2017 FIBA Asia Cup, the Tall Blacks were defeated in the semi-finals by Australia. They went on to lose to Korea in the bronze medal match. Shea Ili was named to the All-Star Team. That year, Pero Cameron was inducted into the FIBA Hall of Fame.

At the 2018 Commonwealth Games, the Tall Blacks finished third with a 79–69 win over Scotland in the bronze medal match. Despite boasting a 7–1 record in the FIBA Basketball World Cup qualifying campaign, on the back of seven straight wins, the Tall Blacks remained in 38th place on the FIBA World Ranking list as of September 2018.

In August 2019, the Tall Blacks had a two-game series in Japan and before heading to Australia to play Canada. Later at the FIBA World Cup, the Tall Blacks missed out on the second round with a 103–97 loss to Greece in their final pool game. In December 2019, Pero Cameron was appointed as head coach following Paul Henare's decision to step down.

=== 2020s ===
In February 2020, the Tall Blacks secured wins over Australia and Guam in the first round of Asia Cup qualifiers. Following this, however, the team was heavily disrupted due to the COVID-19 pandemic. In November 2020, games against Australia and Hong Kong were postponed, with the next FIBA window being in February 2021.

In February 2021, the Tall Blacks played Australia in Cairns, Queensland. A number of regular players were unavailable due to Australian NBL commitments, and due to the pandemic, quarantine periods also forced the Tall Blacks to create an Australian-based team, with many being based in Queensland. They lost 52–81. It marked Mika Vukona's final game for the Tall Blacks. Following the game, Basketball New Zealand withdrew the Tall Blacks from the Olympic Qualifying Tournament in Serbia.

The Tall Blacks made history in their first game of the 2022 Asia Cup Qualifiers, beating the Boomers in Australia for the first time in over 10 years. They followed up that win with another against Guam. They subsequently played in the FIBA Asia Cup in July 2022, where they won bronze.

In August 2023, the Tall Blacks competed in the Super Cup in Hamburg against China, Canada and hosts Germany. That same month, they competed at the FIBA Solidarity Cup in China. New Zealand was one of the first countries to qualify for the 2023 FIBA Basketball World Cup, having secured a spot in the 32-team tournament a year earlier. It marked their seventh world cup appearance. They finished the tournament with a 2–3 record and gained entry into one of the 2024 Olympic Qualifying tournaments.

Confirmed for the Olympic Qualifying Tournament in Piraeus, Greece, the Tall Blacks prepared by facing Finland and Poland in June 2024. The team beat Croatia but lost to Serbia in the Qualifying Tournament, which ended their contention for the Paris Olympics.

== Competitive record ==
=== Olympic Games ===
Olympic Games record
Year	Round	Position	Pld	W	L
(Germany) 1936	No national representative				
(United Kingdom) 1948	No national representative				
(Finland) 1952	Did not participate				
(Australia) 1956	Did not participate				
(Italy) 1960	Did not participate				
(Japan) 1964	Did not participate				
(Mexico) 1968	Did not participate				
(Germany) 1972	Did not participate				
(Canada) 1976	Did not participate				
(Soviet Union) 1980	Did not participate				
(United States) 1984	Did not participate				
(South Korea) 1988	Did not participate				
(Spain) 1992	Did not participate				
(United States) 1996	Did not participate				
(Australia) 2000	Group stage	11th	6	1	5
(Greece) 2004	Group stage	9th	6	1	5
(China) 2008	Did not qualify				
(United Kingdom) 2012	Did not qualify				
(Brazil) 2016	Did not qualify				
(Japan) 2020	Did not qualify				
(France) 2024	Did not qualify				
(United States) 2028	To be determined				
(Australia) 2032	To be determined				
Total	0 Titles	2/19	12	2	10

=== FIBA World Cup ===
FIBA World Cup record
Year	Round	Position	Pld	W	L
(Argentina) 1950	No national representative				
(Brazil) 1954	Did not participate				
(Chile) 1959	Did not participate				
(Brazil) 1963	Did not participate				
(Uruguay) 1967	Did not participate				
(Socialist Federal Republic of Yugoslavia) 1970	Did not participate				
(Puerto Rico) 1974	Did not participate				
(Philippines) 1978	Did not participate				
(Colombia) 1982	Did not participate				
(Spain) 1986	Group stage	21st	5	1	4
(Argentina) 1990	Did not qualify				
(Canada) 1994	Did not qualify				
(Greece) 1998	Did not qualify				
(United States) 2002	Fourth place	4th	9	4	5
(Japan) 2006	Round of 16	9th	6	2	4
(Turkey) 2010	Round of 16	12th	6	3	3
(Spain) 2014	Round of 16	15th	6	2	4
(China) 2019	Group stage	19th	5	3	2
(Philippines) (Japan) (Indonesia) 2023	Group stage	22nd	5	2	3
(Qatar) 2027	To be determined				
(France) 2031	To be determined				
Total	0 Titles	7/19	42	17	25

=== FIBA Asia Cup ===
FIBA Asia Cup record
Year	Round	Position	Pld	W	L
1960–2015	Did not participate				
(Lebanon) 2017	Fourth place	4th	6	3	3
(Indonesia) 2022	Third place	3rd	7	5	2
(Saudi Arabia) 2025	Fourth place	4th	6	4	2
Total	0 Titles	2/2	19	12	7

=== FIBA Oceania Championship ===
FIBA Oceania Championship record
Year	Round	Position	Pld	W	L
(New Zealand) 1971	Runners-up	2nd	3	0	3
(Australia) 1975	Runners-up	2nd	3	0	3
(New Zealand) 1978	Runners-up	2nd	3	1	2
(Australia) 1979	Runners-up	2nd	3	0	3
(New Zealand) 1981	Runners-up	2nd	2	0	2
(New Zealand) 1983	Runners-up	2nd	2	0	2
(Australia) 1985	Runners-up	2nd	3	0	3
(New Zealand) 1987	Runners-up	2nd	3	1	2
(Australia) 1989	Runners-up	2nd	2	0	2
(New Zealand) 1991	Runners-up	2nd	2	0	2
(New Zealand) 1993	Runners-up	2nd	3	1	2
(Australia) 1995	Runners-up	2nd	3	1	2
(New Zealand) 1997	Runners-up	2nd	3	1	2
(New Zealand) 1999	Champions	1st	1	1	0
(New Zealand) 2001	Champions	1st	3	2	1
(Australia) 2003	Runners-up	2nd	3	0	3
(New Zealand) 2005	Runners-up	2nd	3	0	3
(Australia) 2007	Runners-up	2nd	3	1	2
(Australia) (New Zealand) 2009	Champions	1st	2	1	1
(Australia) 2011	Runners-up	2nd	3	0	3
(New Zealand) (Australia) 2013	Runners-up	2nd	2	0	2
(Australia) (New Zealand) 2015	Runners-up	2nd	2	0	2
Total	3 Titles	22/22	57	10	47

=== Commonwealth Games ===
Commonwealth Games record
Year	Round	Position	Pld	W	L
(Australia) 2006	Runners-up	2nd	5	4	1
(Australia) 2018	Third place	3rd	5	3	2
Total	0 Titles	2/2	10	7	3

=== FIBA Stanković Cup ===
FIBA Stanković Cup record
Year	Round	Position	Pld	W	L
(China) 2007	Fifth place	5th	5	2	3
(China) 2011	Champions	1st	4	3	1
(China) 2015	Champions	1st	3	3	0
Total	2 Titles		12	8	4

=== William Jones Cup ===
William Jones Cup record
Year	Round	Position	Pld	W	L
(Chinese Taipei) 1980	Third place	3rd	9	6	3
(Chinese Taipei) 1981	Classification	7th	8	2	6
(Chinese Taipei) 1982	Classification	8th	8	1	7
(Chinese Taipei) 1999	Third place	3rd	8	5	3
(Chinese Taipei) 2000	Champions	1st	6	6	0
Total	1 Title		39	21	19

== Team ==
=== Current roster ===
Roster for the 2027 FIBA Basketball World Cup Qualification.

New Zealand Men's National Basketball Team – 2027 FIBA Basketball World Cup Qualification - Group E roster
Players
Coaches

Pos.	No.	Name	Age – Date of birth	Height	Club	Ctr.
G	0	Tai Webster	30 – 29 May 1995	1.93 m (6 ft 4 in)	Limoges CSP	(France)
F	1	Reuben Te Rangi	30 – 14 October 1994	1.98 m (6 ft 6 in)	Tauranga Whai	(New Zealand)
F	2	Carlin Davison	21 – 21 August 2003	1.98 m (6 ft 6 in)	New Zealand Breakers	(New Zealand)
PG	7	Alex McNaught	23 – 21 June 2002	1.83 m (6 ft 0 in)	Nelson Giants	(New Zealand)
F	8	Sam Mennenga	23 – 12 December 2001	2.06 m (6 ft 9 in)	New Zealand Breakers	(New Zealand)
G	9	Corey Webster	36 – 29 November 1988	1.89 m (6 ft 2 in)	Manawatu Jets	(New Zealand)
PG	11	Flynn Cameron	25 – 30 June 2000	1.96 m (6 ft 5 in)	Adelaide 36ers	(Australia)
F	19	Luca Yates	21 – 29 January 2004	1.96 m (6 ft 5 in)	Cairns Taipans	(Australia)
F	20	Jordan Ngatai (C)	32 – 7 March 1993	1.96 m (6 ft 5 in)	Tauranga Whai	(New Zealand)
C	33	Sam Timmins	28 – 23 May 1997	2.11 m (6 ft 11 in)	Shinagawa City Basketball Club	(Japan)
G	51	Shea Ili	32 – 6 October 1992	1.84 m (6 ft 0 in)	Melbourne United	(Australia)

Head coach

- (New Zealand) Judd Flavell

Assistant coach(es)

- (New Zealand) Michael Fitchett
- (New Zealand) Matt Lacey

Legend

- (C) Team captain
- Club – describes last
  club before the tournament
- Age – describes age
  on 5 August 2025

=== Notable players ===
- Pero Cameron – 2002 FIBA World Championship All-Tournament Team, two-time assistant coach, FIBA Hall of Fame inductee 2017, appointed Head Coach in December 2019 – current.
- Glen Denham – Tall Blacks legend, 169 games played
- Mark Dickel – Tall Blacks legend, 124 games played
- Paul Henare – Former New Zealand Breakers captain, Tall Blacks head coach 2015 – 2019
- Dillon Boucher – Former New Zealand Breakers player, GM of the New Zealand Breakers, member of the New Zealand Order of Merit, current NZNBL CEO
- Stan Hill – Former Tall Blacks captain & assistant coach, Member of the New Zealand Order of Merit, 144 games played
- Phill Jones – Former Cairns Taipans captain, 208 games played
- Sean Marks – Former player and assistant coach with the San Antonio Spurs 2x NBA champion as a player, once as assistant coach, current GM of the Brooklyn Nets
- Kirk Penney – Former NBA player, FIBA Hall of Fame inductee May 2024, Former Tall Blacks captain, 179 games played
- Paora Winitana – In 2006 crafted the current Tall Blacks Haka, former New Zealand Breakers & Adelaide 36ers player
- Peter Pokai – Tall Blacks Legend, 176 games played

=== All-time Stat Leaders ===
- Games played / Captained: Pero Cameron (227) / (170)
- Points scored: Kirk Penney (2079), Phill Jones (1080)
- Assists: Shea Ili (237), Pero Cameron (231)
- Steals: Mika Vukona (106), Kirk Penney (94)
- Blocks: Thomas Abercrombie (48)
- Rebounds: Mika Vukona (791)

=== Past rosters ===
(New Zealand) 1978 Commonwealth Championships finished 2nd

John Macdonald, Stan Hill, John Hill, John Van Uden, Gordon Reardon, Warwick Meehl, John Rademakers, Stuart Ferguson, John Fairweather, Paul Barrett, (Head Coach: Steve McKean, Assistant Coach: Peter Schmidt, Manager: Ivan Dominikovich)

(New Zealand) 1986 World Championship: finished 21st among 24 teams

Gilbert Gordon, Peter Pokai, Stan Hill, Neil Stephens, Dave Edmonds, Ian Webb, Dave Mason, Tony Smith, Colin Crampton, Frank Mulvihill, Glen Denham, John Rademakers (Head Coach: Robert Bishop)

(New Zealand) 2000 Olympic Games: finished 11th among 12 teams

Sean Marks, Pero Cameron, Mark Dickel, Phill Jones, Kirk Penney, Robert Hickey, Nenad Vučinić, Tony Rampton, Paul Henare, Brad Riley, Ralph Lattimore, Peter Pokai (Head Coach: Keith Mair)

(New Zealand) 2002 World Championship: finished 4th among 16 teams

Sean Marks, Pero Cameron, Mark Dickel, Phill Jones, Kirk Penney, Robert Hickey, Dillon Boucher, Damon Rampton, Ed Book, Paul Henare, Paora Winitana, Judd Flavell (Head Coach: Tab Baldwin)

(New Zealand) 2004 Olympic Games: finished 10th among 12 teams

Sean Marks, Mark Dickel, Phill Jones, Pero Cameron, Kirk Penney, Dillon Boucher, Ed Book, Paul Henare, Paora Winitana, Tony Rampton, Aaron Olson, Craig Bradshaw (Head Coach: Tab Baldwin)

(New Zealand) 2006 World Championship: finished 16th among 24 teams

Kirk Penney, Pero Cameron, Phill Jones, Mark Dickel, Casey Frank, Paul Henare, Dillon Boucher, Paora Winitana, Tony Rampton, Craig Bradshaw, Aaron Olson, Mika Vukona (Head Coach: Tab Baldwin)

(New Zealand) 2010 World Championship: finished 12th among 24 teams

Thomas Abercrombie, Benny Anthony, Craig Bradshaw, Pero Cameron, Michael Fitchett, Casey Frank, Phill Jones, Jeremy Kench, Kirk Penney, Alex Pledger, Lindsay Tait, Mika Vukona (Head Coach: Nenad Vučinić)

(New Zealand) 2014 FIBA World Cup: finished 15th among 24 teams

(New Zealand) 2015 FIBA Oceania Championship

Corey Webster, Dion Prewster, Everard Bartlett, Isaac Fotu, Jarrod Kenny, Lindsay Tait, Mika Vukona (C), Reuben Te Rangi, Robert Loe, Shea Ili, Tai Wynyard, Thomas Abercrombie. (Head CoachPaul Henare), (Assisants Ross McMains, Mike Fitchett)

(New Zealand) 2017 FIBA Asia Cup: finished 4th among 16 teams

Reuben Te Rangi, Luke Aston, Isaac Letoa, Finn Delany, Derone Raukawa, James Hunter, Dyson King-Hawea, Tohi Smith-Milner, Jordan Ngatai, Ethan Rusbatch, Sam Timmins, Shea Ili. (Head Coach Paul Henare), (Assistants Pero Cameron and Ross McMains)

(New Zealand) 2019 FIBA World Cup: finished 19th among 32 teams

Tai Webster, Finn Delany, Shea Ili, Jarrod Kenny, Corey Webster (C), Thomas Abercrombie, Robert Loe, Tohi Smith-Milner, Jordan Ngatai, Ethan Rusbatch, Alex Pledger, Isaac Fotu. (Head coach Paul Henare), (assistants Pero Cameron, Ross McMains)

(New Zealand) 2022 FIBA Asia Cup: finished 3rd among 16 teams

Max Darling, Sam Mennenga, Taylor Britt, Taine Murray, Kane Keil, Flynn Cameron, Kruz Perrott-Hunt, Isaac Davidson, Jordan Hunt, Tohi Smith-Milner, Taki Fahrensohn, Sam Timmins. (Head Coach Pero Cameron), (Assistants Ross McMains and Zico Coronel)

(New Zealand) 2023 FIBA World Cup : finished 22nd among 32 teams

Reuben Te Rangi (C), Izayah Le'afa, Finn Delany, Taylor Britt, Shea Ili, Yanni Wetzell, Flynn Cameron, Tohi Smith-Milner, Jordan Ngatai, Hyrum Harris, Walter Brown, Isaac Fotu.

(Head Coach Pero Cameron), (Assistant coach(es), Zico Coronel, Michael Fitchett, Aaron Young)

== Kit ==
=== Manufacturer ===
2015: Peak
