= Otago Nuggets =

Basketball team in Dunedin, New Zealand

- Leagues: NZNBL
- Founded: 1990
- History: Otago Nuggets; 1990–2008; 2010–2014; 2020–present
- Arena: Edgar Centre
- Location: Dunedin, Otago, New Zealand
- Team colors: Navy blue, sky blue, gold
- Main sponsor: Night 'n Day
- General manager: Angela Ruske
- Head coach: Jeff Sparrow
- Championships: 2 (2020, 2022)
- Website: OtagoNuggets.com

The Otago Nuggets are a New Zealand professional men's basketball team based in Dunedin. The Nuggets compete in the National Basketball League (NBL) and play their home games at the Edgar Centre. For sponsorship reasons, they are known as the Night 'n Day Otago Nuggets.

== Team history ==
The Nuggets entered the National Basketball League (NBL) for the first time in 1990. After finishing in the top six in five of their first eight seasons, and making the semi-finals three times in that span, the Nuggets finished in the bottom four in their next 14 seasons, including being perennial wooden spooners. Following a tumultuous 2008 season, where the Nuggets collected their fourth consecutive wooden spoon and had mass player turnover throughout the year, Basketball Otago withdrew the Nuggets from the 2009 season, citing financial concerns. They returned to the league in 2010 and subsequently finished with a winless record (0–18), becoming just the third team in NBL history to finish a season without a win (joining the 1998 Northland Suns and the 2009 Taranaki Mountainairs). The Nuggets also had a 33-game losing streak that spanned April 2008 to May 2011.

In 2013, the Nuggets made it to the post-season for the first time since 1997. They finished the regular season in second place with a 12–4 record, before losing 87–72 to the Nelson Giants in the semifinal. In 2014, the Nuggets missed the finals with a 7–11 record.

In November 2014, Basketball Otago withdrew the Nuggets from the NBL for a second time. In September 2015, Basketball Otago announced their decision to keep the Nuggets out of the NBL in 2016, looking instead to bringing them back in 2017. However, in September 2016, they opted not to apply for a position in the 2017 competition. In February 2018, plans to resurrect the Nuggets were further put on hold.

In April 2019, Basketball Otago were granted approval to make an NBL bid for the 2020 season. The Nuggets were granted provisional entry back into the NBL in July 2019, but the following month, their formal entry was deferred to the 2021 season, with both the league and the organisation feeling an additional 12 months would help the team to better lay the foundations needed for success. However, in May 2020, the Nuggets formally returned to the league in a 2020 competition that was revised and modified due to the COVID-19 pandemic.

The Nuggets had a successful return to the NBL in 2020 as they finished the regular season in first place with a 9–5 record behind Coach of the Year winner Brent Matehaere. They went on to reach their first ever NBL final behind the likes of Jordan Hunt, Jarrod Kenny and Jordan Ngatai, where they defeated the Manawatu Jets 79–77 to win their maiden NBL championship.

In November 2021, the Nuggets were purchased by Sports Entertainment Network New Zealand (SENZ), a subsidiary of Australia's Sports Entertainment Group (SEG).

In 2022, the Nuggets finished the regular season in third place with a 10–8 record and went on to reach the NBL final behind the likes of Tray Boyd III, Keith Williams, Todd Withers and Sam Timmins. In the final, they won their second championship in three years with an 81–73 victory over the Auckland Tuatara.

On 6 June 2025, it was announced that SEG would transfer ownership of the team to a collective of local Dunedin community supporters on 31 July 2025.

== Current roster ==
Note: Flags indicate national team eligibility at FIBA-sanctioned events. Players may hold other non-FIBA nationalities not displayed.

Otago Nuggets roster
Players
Coaches

Pos.	No.	Nat.	Name	Ht.
G	1	(New Zealand)	Thata-Paese, Tyson	1.89 m (6 ft 2 in)
G	4	(New Zealand)	Chisholm, Oak	1.88 m (6 ft 2 in)
G/F	5	(Ethiopia)	Tuach, Buay (I)	1.98 m (6 ft 6 in)
F	6	(Australia)	Moller, Craig (I)	2.03 m (6 ft 8 in)
G	7	(New Zealand)	Bardsley, Matthew	1.89 m (6 ft 2 in)
F	8	(New Zealand)	Miller-Jose, Isaac	2.03 m (6 ft 8 in)
F	9	(New Zealand)	Bezett, Harry
G	10	(New Zealand)	Smiler, Caleb	1.91 m (6 ft 3 in)
G/F	12	(New Zealand)	Rusbatch, Ethan (C)	1.96 m (6 ft 5 in)
G	13	(United States)	Louis, Alain (I)	1.85 m (6 ft 1 in)
F	14	(New Zealand)	Oppenhuis, Fred
F	18	(New Zealand)	McKenzie, Zach	2.02 m (6 ft 8 in)
F	21	(New Zealand)	Martin, Christian	1.87 m (6 ft 2 in)
F	22	(New Zealand)	Boomer, Liam	1.96 m (6 ft 5 in)
G	42	(New Zealand)	Tipene, Patrick
G	43	(New Zealand)	Hunt, Toby	1.91 m (6 ft 3 in)

Head coach

- (United States) Jeff Sparrow

Assistant coach(es)

- (New Zealand) Matheson Colquhoun
- (Australia) Ryan Rowley

Legend

- (C) Team captain
- (DP) Development player
- (I) Import player
- Injured

- Roster
Updated: 31 May 2026
