= 2021 New Zealand NBL season =

- League: New Zealand NBL
- Sport: Basketball
- Duration: 24 April – 23 July
- Games: 18
- Teams: 10

Regular season
- Minor premiers: Wellington Saints
- Season MVP: Dion Prewster (Wellington Saints)
- Top scorer: Hunter Hale (Nelson Giants)

Final Four
- Champions: Wellington Saints
- Runners-up: Hawke's Bay Hawks
- Grand Final MVP: Kerwin Roach

New Zealand NBL seasons
- ← 2020 2022 →

The 2021 NBL season was the 40th season of the National Basketball League.

As a result of the modified, COVID-affected 2020 season, three of the top four teams in 2019 (Wellington Saints, Hawke's Bay Hawks and Southland Sharks) did not compete. All three teams re-entered in 2021 to increase the league's total number to 10 for the first time since 2014.

The regular season commenced on 24 April in Dunedin with the Otago Nuggets (2020 champions) hosting the Wellington Saints (2019 champions) at the Edgar Centre. The season contained 12 weeks of regular season games followed by a two-day finals schedule in July. The Saints won their 12th NBL championship in 2021 with a win over the Hawks in the grand final.

== Team information ==
Team	City	Arena	Colours	Head coach	Import	Import
Auckland Huskies	Auckland	Eventfinda Stadium		(New Zealand) Aaron Young	(United States) Justin Bibbs	(United States) Chris Johnson
Canterbury Rams	Christchurch	Cowles Stadium		(Australia) Mick Downer	(United States) E. J. Singler	(United States) Deshon Taylor
Franklin Bulls	Auckland	Franklin Pool and Leisure Centre		(New Zealand) Jamie Reddish	(United States) Zane Waterman	
Hawke's Bay Hawks	Napier	Pettigrew Green Arena		(Australia) Adam Forde / (Australia) Jacob Chance	(Australia) Rhys Vague	(United States) Devondrick Walker
Manawatu Jets	Palmerston North	Arena Manawatu		(New Zealand) Tim McTamney	(United States) DeAndre Daniels	(United States) Daishon Knight
Nelson Giants	Nelson	Trafalgar Centre		(New Zealand) Michael Fitchett	(United States) Hunter Hale	(United States) Donte Ingram
Otago Nuggets	Dunedin	Edgar Centre		(New Zealand) Brent Matehaere	(Australia) Geremy McKay	(United States) Isaiah Moss
Southland Sharks	Invercargill	Stadium Southland		(Australia) Rob Beveridge	(United States) Courtney Belger	(United States) Josh Cunningham
Taranaki Mountainairs	New Plymouth	TSB Stadium		(New Zealand) Trent Adam		
Wellington Saints	Wellington	TSB Bank Arena		(New Zealand) Zico Coronel	(Jamaica) Romaro Gill	(United States) Kerwin Roach

== Summary ==
In the final round of the regular season, due to an extreme weather event and major flooding across the top of the South Island, the games between the Manawatu Jets and Nelson Giants (Sunday 5pm) and Taranaki Mountainairs and Nelson Giants (Monday 7:30pm) were both cancelled. With the games not having an impact on the 2021 Final Four, the League advised neither clash would be rescheduled.

=== Regular season standings ===
Pos	Team	W	L	Qualification
1	Wellington Saints	16	2	Final Four
2	Hawke's Bay Hawks	13	5	Final Four
3	Southland Sharks	13	5	Final Four
4	Auckland Huskies	11	7	Final Four
5	Canterbury Rams	9	9	
6	Otago Nuggets	9	9	
7	Nelson Giants	6	10	
8	Franklin Bulls	5	13	
9	Manawatu Jets	4	13	
10	Taranaki Mountainairs	2	15	

Updated to match(es) played on 17 July 2021. Source: NZNBL

=== Final Four ===
Semi Finals
1	Wellington Saints	99
4	Auckland Huskies	73
2	Hawke's Bay Hawks	98
3	Southland Sharks	91

Final
Wellington Saints	77
Hawke's Bay Hawks	75

== Awards ==
=== Statistics leaders ===
Stats as of the end of the regular season

Category	Player	Team	Stat
Points per game	Hunter Hale	Nelson Giants	26.9
Rebounds per game	Sam Timmins	Otago Nuggets	13.9
Assists per game	Courtney Belger	Southland Sharks	5.7
Steals per game	Hunter Hale	Nelson Giants	2.6
Blocks per game	DeAndre Daniels	Manawatu Jets	2.3

=== Regular season ===
- Most Valuable Player: Dion Prewster (Wellington Saints)
- Most Outstanding Guard: Dion Prewster (Wellington Saints)
- Most Outstanding NZ Guard: Dion Prewster (Wellington Saints)
- Most Outstanding Forward: Sam Timmins (Otago Nuggets)
- Most Outstanding NZ Forward/Centre: Sam Timmins (Otago Nuggets)
- Scoring Champion: Hunter Hale (Nelson Giants)
- Rebounding Champion: Sam Timmins (Otago Nuggets)
- Assist Champion: Courtney Belger (Southland Sharks)
- Most Improved Player: Sam Timmins (Otago Nuggets)
- Defensive Player of the Year: Dion Prewster (Wellington Saints)
- Youth Player of the Year: Zach Riley (Auckland Huskies)
- Coach of the Year: Zico Coronel (Wellington Saints)
- All-Star Five:
  - G: Dion Prewster (Wellington Saints)
  - G: Hunter Hale (Nelson Giants)
  - F: Dom Kelman-Poto (Southland Sharks)
  - F: Taane Samuel (Wellington Saints)
  - C: Sam Timmins (Otago Nuggets)

=== Final Four ===
- Grand Final MVP: Kerwin Roach (Wellington Saints)
