= 2025 New Zealand NBL season =

- League: New Zealand NBL
- Sport: Basketball
- Duration: 12 March – 20 July
- Games: 20
- Teams: 11

Regular season
- Minor premiers: Wellington Saints
- Season MVP: Josiah Allick (Southland Sharks)
- Top scorer: Jeremy Combs (Nelson Giants)

Finals
- Champions: Wellington Saints
- Runners-up: Southland Sharks
- Grand Final MVP: Hyrum Harris (Wellington Saints)

New Zealand NBL seasons
- ← 2024 2026 →

The 2025 NBL season was the 44th season of the National Basketball League. The competition increased to 12 teams in 2025 with the debut of the Indian Panthers, but later decreased to 11 teams in May following the withdrawal of the Panthers.

The 2025 season saw the pre-season blitz return, followed by the regular season starting on 12 March. The finals took place from 9 to 20 July.

== Team information ==
| Team | City | Arena | Colours | Head coach | Import | Import | Import |
|---|---|---|---|---|---|---|---|
| Auckland Tuatara | Auckland | Eventfinda Stadium | | (Australia) Cameron Gliddon | (United States) Luther Muhammad | (Ethiopia) Buay Tuach | (United States) Charles Pride |
| Canterbury Rams | Christchurch | Cowles Stadium | | (New Zealand) Quinn Clinton | (Australia) Kyle Bowen | (Australia) Sean Macdonald | (United States) CJ Penha |
| Franklin Bulls | Pukekohe | Franklin Pool and Leisure Centre | | (Germany) Sebastian Gleim | (Germany) Till Gloger | (United States) Tae Hardy | (Australia) David Okwera |
| Hawke's Bay Hawks | Napier | Pettigrew Green Arena | | (Australia) Sam Gruggen | (United States) Brandon Alston | (Australia) Daniel Grida | (Australia) Wani Swaka Lo Buluk |
| Manawatu Jets | Palmerston North | Arena Manawatu | | (United States) Tony Webster | (United States) Miles Gibson | (United States) Kenny Goins | (United States) Quinton Rose |
| Nelson Giants | Nelson | Trafalgar Centre | | (New Zealand) Michael Fitchett | (United States) Jeremy Combs | (United States) Andrew Jones | (United States) Alex Robinson |
| Otago Nuggets | Dunedin | Edgar Centre | | (United States) Mike Kelly | (United States) Donald Carey | (United States) Jaylen Sebree | |
| Southland Sharks | Invercargill | Stadium Southland | | (United States) Jonathan Yim | (United States) Josiah Allick | (United States) Caleb Asberry | (United States) Keylan Boone |
| Taranaki Airs | New Plymouth | TSB Stadium | | (Australia) Sam Mackinnon | (Australia) Deng Dut | (United States) Armon Fletcher | (Australia) Craig Moller |
| Tauranga Whai | Tauranga | Mercury Baypark | | (New Zealand) Matt Lacey | (Australia) Sean Bairstow | | |
| Wellington Saints | Wellington | TSB Bank Arena | | (New Zealand) Aaron Young | (Australia) Shaun Bruce | (Australia) Nick Marshall | (United States) Nick Muszynski |

=== Mid-season withdrawal ===
| Team | City | Arena | Colours | Head coach | Import | Import | Import |
|---|---|---|---|---|---|---|---|
| Indian Panthers | Auckland | Pulman Arena | | (Australia) Jonathan Goodman | (China) Shengzhe Li | | |

== Summary ==
On 1 May 2025, the Indian Panthers were suspended from the 2025 season with immediate effective, following the team's failure to take the court for their 29 April game against the Canterbury Rams. On 9 May, the league postponed the Panthers' scheduled games for 14 May against the Southland Sharks and 16 May against the Otago Nuggets. On 19 May, the Panthers' 20 May game against the Tauranga Whai was postponed. On 22 May, the Panthers officially withdrew from the NBL due to not being in a position to meet the requirements of the league to complete the season for a variety of reasons. As a result of the Panthers withdrawal, the NBL advised that the 2025 season would be completed with 11 teams and that all results from the nine games played by the Panthers would be removed entirely. The Panthers had a 0–9 record at the time of their withdrawal.

=== Regular season standings ===
| Pos | Team | Pld | W | L | Qualification |
|---|---|---|---|---|---|
| 1 | Wellington Saints | 20 | 16 | 4 | Semi Finals |
| 2 | Canterbury Rams | 20 | 15 | 5 | Semi Finals |
| 3 | Taranaki Airs | 20 | 12 | 8 | Play-in |
| 4 | Southland Sharks | 20 | 12 | 8 | Play-in |
| 5 | Auckland Tuatara | 20 | 10 | 10 | Play-in |
| 6 | Tauranga Whai | 20 | 9 | 11 | Play-in |
| 7 | Franklin Bulls | 20 | 9 | 11 | |
| 8 | Manawatu Jets | 20 | 9 | 11 | |
| 9 | Nelson Giants | 20 | 8 | 12 | |
| 10 | Hawke's Bay Hawks | 20 | 7 | 13 | |
| 11 | Otago Nuggets | 20 | 3 | 17 | |
| 12 | Indian Panthers | 0 | 0 | 0 | Withdrawn |

Source: NZNBL

=== Finals ===
Play-In Matches
3 | Taranaki Airs | 67
6 | Tauranga Whai | 83
4 | Southland Sharks | 91
5 | Auckland Tuatara | 75

Semi Finals
1 | Wellington Saints | 93
6 | Tauranga Whai | 68
2 | Canterbury Rams | 82
4 | Southland Sharks | 101

Final
Wellington Saints | 88
Southland Sharks | 83

== Awards ==
=== Statistics leaders ===
Stats as of the end of the regular season

| Category | Player | Team | Stat |
|---|---|---|---|
| Points per game | Jeremy Combs | Nelson Giants | 24.4 |
| Rebounds per game | Josiah Allick | Southland Sharks | 11.1 |
| Assists per game | Owen Foxwell | Taranaki Airs | 8.0 |
| Steals per game | Quinton Rose | Manawatu Jets | 3.7 |
| Blocks per game | Nick Muszynski | Wellington Saints | 2.7 |

=== Regular season ===
- Most Valuable Player: Josiah Allick (Southland Sharks)
- Most Outstanding Guard: Nick Marshall (Wellington Saints)
- Most Outstanding NZ Guard: Izayah Le'afa (Wellington Saints)
- Most Outstanding Forward: Josiah Allick (Southland Sharks)
- Most Outstanding NZ Forward/Centre: Carlin Davison (Taranaki Airs)
- Scoring Champion: Jeremy Combs (Nelson Giants)
- Rebounding Champion: Josiah Allick (Southland Sharks)
- Assist Champion: Owen Foxwell (Taranaki Airs)
- Most Improved Player: Jackson Ball (Hawkes Bay Hawks)
- Defensive Player of the Year: Hyrum Harris (Wellington Saints)
- Youth Player of the Year: Jackson Ball (Hawkes Bay Hawks)
- Coach of the Year: Aaron Young (Wellington Saints)
- All-Star Five:
  - G: Nick Marshall (Wellington Saints)
  - G: Sean Macdonald (Canterbury Rams)
  - F: Carlin Davison (Taranaki Airs)
  - F: Jeremy Combs (Nelson Giants)
  - C: Josiah Allick (Southland Sharks)

=== Finals ===
- Grand Final MVP: Hyrum Harris (Wellington Saints)
