= New Zealand NBL Most Outstanding Kiwi Guard Award =

The National Basketball League Most Outstanding Kiwi Guard is an annual National Basketball League (NBL) award given since the 1985 New Zealand NBL season to the best performing New Zealand guard(s) of the regular season. The winner receives the John Macdonald Trophy, which is named in honour of Macdonald, a New Plymouth native and a former captain of the New Zealand men's national basketball team.

== Winners ==
Denotes players that also won the overall Most Outstanding Guard that season.

Year	Player	Team
1985	Tony Smith	Hamilton
1986	John Rademakers	Canterbury Rams
1987	Tony Smith (2)	North Shore
1988	Byron Vaetoe	Auckland
1989	Byron Vaetoe (2)	Auckland
1990	Byron Vaetoe (3)	New Plymouth Bulls
1991	Byron Vaetoe (4)	New Plymouth Bulls
1992	Warwick Meehl	Waitakere Rangers
1993	Byron Vaetoe (5)	Hawke's Bay Hawks
1994	Chris Tupu	Canterbury Rams
1995	Ralph Lattimore	Auckland Stars
1996	Phill Jones	Nelson Giants
1997	Phill Jones (2)	Nelson Giants
1998	Phill Jones (3)	Nelson Giants
1999	Kirk Penney	North Harbour Kings
2000	Tony Brown	Waikato Warriors
2001	Phill Jones (4)	Nelson Giants
2002	Terrence Lewis	Canterbury Rams
2003	Lindsay Tait	Auckland Stars
2004	Lindsay Tait (2)	Auckland Stars
2005	Lindsay Tait (3)	Auckland Stars
2006	Paora Winitana	Hawke's Bay Hawks
2007	Hayden Allen	Harbour Heat
2007	Lindsay Tait (4)	Auckland Stars
2008	Phill Jones (5)	Nelson Giants
2009	Phill Jones (6)	Nelson Giants
2010	Lindsay Tait (5)	Wellington Saints
2011	Lindsay Tait (6)	Wellington Saints
2012	Lindsay Tait (7)	Auckland Pirates
2013	Lindsay Tait (8)	Wellington Saints
2014	Corey Webster	Wellington Saints
2015	Lindsay Tait (9)	Wellington Saints
2016	Shea Ili	Wellington Saints
2017	Corey Webster (2)	Wellington Saints
2018	Shea Ili (2)	Wellington Saints
2019	Shea Ili (3)	Wellington Saints
2020	N/A	N/A
2021	Dion Prewster	Wellington Saints
2022	Corey Webster (3)	Franklin Bulls
2023	Derone Raukawa	Hawke's Bay Hawks
2024	Taylor Britt	Canterbury Rams
2025	Izayah Le'afa	Wellington Saints
2026	Taylor Britt (2)	Canterbury Rams

== See also ==
- List of National Basketball League (New Zealand) awards
