= New Zealand NBL Rebounding Champion =

Sports award in New Zealand

The National Basketball League Rebounding Champion is an annual National Basketball League (NBL) award given since the league's inaugural season to the player with the highest rebounds per game average of the regular season. The winner receives the Garry Pettis Memorial Trophy, which is named in honour of Pettis, a former New Zealand player and coach who is most notable for guiding the Canterbury Rams to the 1986 championship as head coach.

== Winners ==
Denotes players that also led the league in scoring that season.

Year	Player	Nationality	Team	RPG
1982	James Lofton	New Zealand	Porirua	
1983	Robbie Robinson	New Zealand	Napier Sunhawks	
1984	Mark Davis	United States	Hamilton	
1985	Willie Burton	United States	Palmerston North Jets	16.1
1986	Frank Smith	United States	Nelson Giants	
1987	Willie Burton (2)	United States	Hawke's Bay Hawks	14.9
1988	John Martens	United States	Waitemata Dolphins	
1989	Willie Burton (3)	United States	Palmerston North Jets	13.6
1990	Willie Burton (4)	United States	Palmerston North Jets	14.5
1991	Willie Burton (5)	United States	New Plymouth Bulls	13.6
1992	Joe Turner	United States	Waitakere Rangers	
1993	Pero Cameron	New Zealand	Waikato Warriors	12.3
1994	Willie Burton (6)	United States	Hawke's Bay Hawks	13.5
1995	Jeff Smith	Canada	Northland Suns	
1996	Jeff Daniels	United States	North Harbour Vikings	
1997	Daryn Shaw	New Zealand	Taranaki Bears	
1998	Robert Wilson	Canada	Hawke's Bay Hawks	
1999	Chris Ensminger	United States	North Harbour Kings	
2000	Tony Rampton	New Zealand	Nelson Giants	14.6
2001	Brian Gomes	United States	North Harbour Kings	14.4
2002	John Whorton	United States	Canterbury Rams	13.4
2003	John Whorton (2)	United States	Canterbury Rams	16.5
2004	David Cooper	Australia	Manawatu Jets	11.7
2005	David Cooper (2)	Australia	Manawatu Jets	11.5
2006	Miles Pearce	New Zealand	Otago Nuggets	11.9
2007	Link Abrams	New Zealand	Taranaki Mountainairs	11.5
2008	Antoine Tisby	United States	Otago Nuggets	10.8
2009	Jamil Terrell	United States	Manawatu Jets	10.3
2010	Alex Pledger	New Zealand	Waikato Pistons	12.6
2011	Nick Horvath	New Zealand	Manawatu Jets	11.7
2012	Nick Horvath (2)	New Zealand	Manawatu Jets	15.8
2013	Zack Atkinson	United States	Waikato Pistons	14.6
2014	Nick Horvath (3)	New Zealand	Manawatu Jets	15.9
2015	Jeremiah Trueman	New Zealand	Manawatu Jets	12.4
2016	Alex Pledger (2)	New Zealand	Southland Sharks	11.4
2017	Amir Williams	United States	Hawke's Bay Hawks	10.2
2018	Kuran Iverson	United States	Manawatu Jets	11.1
2019	Marcel Jones	New Zealand	Southern Huskies	11.2 (Note: The NBL officially announced Marcel Jones as the rebounding champion and recipient of the Garry Pettis Award for 2019, despite Venky Jois of the Super City Rangers averaging 11.5 rebounds per game (13 games) compared to Jones' 11.2 per game (14 games).)
2020	Marcel Jones (2)	New Zealand	Taranaki Mountainairs	13.4
2021	Sam Timmins	New Zealand	Otago Nuggets	13.9
2022	John Bohannon	Jordan	Manawatu Jets	14.0
2023	Robert Loe	New Zealand	Auckland Tuatara	11.5
2024	Josh Roberts	United States	Hawke's Bay Hawks	13.2
2025	Josiah Allick	United States	Southland Sharks	11.1
2026	Jace Carter; Sam Timmins (2)	United States; New Zealand	Franklin Bulls; Southland Sharks	11.0

== See also ==
- List of National Basketball League (New Zealand) awards
