= New Zealand NBL Kiwi MVP Award =

The National Basketball League Kiwi MVP was an annual National Basketball League (NBL) award given to the best performing New Zealand player(s) of the regular season. The first Kiwi MVP was awarded in 1984. This was followed by the award being recognised every year between 1991 and 2018. It was discontinued in 2019. From 2003 onwards, the New Zealand NBL Most Valuable Player Award took preeminence.

== Winners ==
Denotes players that also won the overall MVP that season.
Denotes the year a separate New Zealand player won the overall MVP.

Year	Player	Team
1984	John Rademakers	Canterbury Rams
1985	N/A	N/A
1986	N/A	N/A
1987	N/A	N/A
1988	N/A	N/A
1989	N/A	N/A
1990	N/A	N/A
1991	Byron Vaetoe	New Plymouth Bulls
1992	Neil Stephens	Wellington Saints
1993	Pero Cameron	Waikato Warriors
1994	Pero Cameron (2)	Auckland Stars
1995	Pero Cameron (3)	Auckland Stars
1996	Phill Jones	Nelson Giants
1997	Pero Cameron (4)	Auckland Rebels
1998	Phill Jones (2)	Nelson Giants
1999	Pero Cameron (5)	Auckland Rebels
2000	Tony Rampton	Nelson Giants
2001	Phill Jones (3)	Nelson Giants
2002	Terrence Lewis	Canterbury Rams
2003	Dillon Boucher	Waikato Titans
2004	Adrian Majstrovich	Hawke's Bay Hawks
2005	Lindsay Tait	Auckland Stars
2006	Casey Frank	Auckland Stars
2007	Link Abrams	Taranaki Mountainairs
2007	Paora Winitana	Hawke's Bay Hawks
2008	Casey Frank (2)	Auckland Stars
2009	Phill Jones (4)	Nelson Giants
2010	Thomas Abercrombie	Waikato Pistons
2011	Alex Pledger	Waikato Pistons
2012	Nick Horvath	Manawatu Jets
2013	Lindsay Tait (2)	Wellington Saints
2014	Corey Webster	Wellington Saints
2015	Lindsay Tait (3)	Wellington Saints
2016	Marcel Jones	Canterbury Rams
2017	Corey Webster (2)	Wellington Saints
2018	Shea Ili	Wellington Saints

== Players with most awards ==
Player	Editions	Notes
(New Zealand) Pero Cameron	5	1993–1995, 1997, 1999
(New Zealand) Phill Jones	3	1996, 1998, 2001
(New Zealand) Casey Frank	2	2006, 2008
(New Zealand) Lindsay Tait	2	2005, 2013
(New Zealand) Corey Webster	2	2014, 2017

== See also ==
- List of National Basketball League (New Zealand) awards
