= Tai Wesley =

American basketball player (born 1986)

Personal information
- Born: May 13, 1986 (age 40) Orem, Utah, U.S.
- Listed height: 6 ft 7 in (2.01 m)
- Listed weight: 240 lb (109 kg)

Career information
- High school: Provo (Provo, Utah)
- College: Utah State (2007–2011)
- NBA draft: 2011: undrafted
- Playing career: 2011–2020
- Position: Power forward

Career history
- 2011–2012: Den Bosch
- 2012–2013: SPO Rouen
- 2013–2014: Den Bosch
- 2014–2015: Southland Sharks
- 2014–2016: New Zealand Breakers
- 2016–2017: Wellington Saints
- 2016–2018: Melbourne United
- 2018–2019: New Zealand Breakers
- 2019: Brujos de Guayama
- 2019–2020: South East Melbourne Phoenix

Career highlights
- 2× NBL champion (2015, 2018); All-NBL Second Team (2018); 3× NZNBL champion (2015–2017); 2× NZNBL Finals MVP (2015, 2016); 2× NZNBL All-Star Five (2015, 2017); DBL champion (2012); Dutch Supercup champion (2013); 2× All-DBL Team (2012, 2014); DBL Statistical Player of the Year (2012); 2× DBL All-Star (2012, 2014); WAC Player of the Year (2011); 2× First-team All-WAC (2010, 2011); Utah Mr. Basketball (2004)
Medals
Representing Guam
Pacific Games
Gold medal – first place	2015 Papua New Guinea	Team
Gold medal – first place	2019 Samoa	Team

Tai William Evans Wesley (born May 13, 1986) is an American former professional basketball player. He played college basketball for the Utah State Aggies, where he was named the Western Athletic Conference Player of the Year in 2011. After beginning his career with successful stints in Europe, he made a name for himself in Australia and New Zealand, winning two Australian NBL championships and three New Zealand NBL championships. Wesley also represented the Guam national team on numerous occasions.

== Early life ==
Wesley was born in Orem, Utah to Susan and Hiagi Wesley. He lived in Guam from age 5–11 while his father worked at the University of Guam. The family then returned to Utah where Wesley attended Provo High School.

At Provo, Wesley played for school's basketball team and was named Mr. Basketball in the state of Utah by the Deseret News and the 4A Most Valuable Player by the Salt Lake Tribune as a prep senior. He averaged 16.7 points, eight rebounds, four assists, two blocks and one steal per game during his senior season, while shooting 65 percent from the field. He led Provo to the state title and was named tournament MVP after averaging 19.3 points in four games.

== College career ==
After redshirting the 2004–05 season, Wesley did not join the Utah State Aggies until the 2007–08 season after he went on a two-year Mormon mission to Oaxaca, Mexico.

Wesley started 24 games and played in all 35 in his first season at Utah State. He finished the year averaging 9.9 points, 4.5 rebounds and 2.1 assists, while shooting 63.5 percent from the field and 72.2 percent from the free throw line.

As a sophomore in 2008–09, Wesley started all 35 games and finished the season averaging 12.0 points, 6.0 rebounds and 2.7 assists per game, while shooting 59.2 percent from the field and 68.4 percent from the free throw line. He subsequently earned NABC All-District 6 second team honors. He was also named to the WAC all-tournament team after averaging 10.0 points, 8.7 rebounds and 4.7 assists in helping the Aggies win the WAC tournament.

As a junior in 2009–10, Wesley started all 35 games and averaged 13.7 points, 6.6 rebounds, 3.3 assists and 1.3 blocks. He subsequently earned first-team all-WAC and NABC All-District 6 second team honors. He was also named to the WAC all-tournament team for the second straight year after averaging 13.0 points, 9.0 rebounds and 4.3 assists in helping the Aggies reach the final of the WAC tournament.

As a senior in 2010–11, Wesley was the cornerstone of the team, leading the Aggies in points, rebounds and steals per game. He earned honorable mention Associated Press All-America honors as well as being named the WAC Player of the Year. He was also named first-team all-WAC for the second consecutive season. He averaged career-best marks of 14.8 points and 8.0 rebounds per game, to go along with 2.1 assists per game. He started all 34 games, making it three consecutive seasons without missing a start to move to third in total career starts at USU (128). He also averaged 16.5 points and 10.5 rebounds per game during the WAC tournament to make the WAC all-tournament team for the third consecutive year while helping the Aggies win their second tournament title in three years.

== Professional career ==
=== Europe (2011–2014) ===
After attending a pre-draft workout with the NBA's Minnesota Timberwolves, Wesley moved to the Netherlands for the 2011–12 season, beginning his professional career with Den Bosch of the Dutch Basketball League. In 41 games, he averaged 13.4 points, 6.1 rebounds, 2.4 assists, 1.7 steals and 1.0 blocks per game.

For the 2012–13 season, Wesley moved to France to play for SPO Rouen Basket of the LNB Pro B. In 33 games, he averaged 12.9 points, 5.4 rebounds, 2.4 assists and 1.2 steals per game.

Wesley returned to the Netherlands and Den Bosch for the 2013–14 season. In 45 league games, he averaged 14.1 points, 5.8 rebounds, 3.3 assists and 1.7 steals per game. He also averaged 17.7 points, 6.2 rebounds, 3.7 assists and 1.0 steals in six EuroChallenge games. He was subsequently named to the All-DBL Team.

=== New Zealand (2014–2017) ===
In June 2014, Wesley moved to New Zealand to play for the Southland Sharks. He qualified as a non-restricted player via the FIBA Oceania Pacific Island rule due to his Fijian heritage and association with Guam Basketball. In eight games to finish the 2014 New Zealand NBL season, he averaged 16.0 points, 9.4 rebounds, 2.5 assists and 1.1 steals per game.

As a result of his form with the Sharks, Wesley was offered a contract by the New Zealand Breakers to play in the Australian NBL. He signed with the Breakers for the 2014–15 NBL season, going on to earn player of the week honors for round 12 and helping the Breakers win the championship with a 2–1 grand final series victory over the Cairns Taipans. In 32 games, he averaged 8.0 points, 4.8 rebounds and 1.5 assists per game.

Wesley remained in New Zealand and re-joined the Southland Sharks for the 2015 New Zealand NBL season. He was twice named player of the week before earning Finals MVP honors after helping the Sharks win the championship with a 72–68 win over the Wellington Saints in the grand final. In 20 games, he averaged 18.4 points, 9.5 rebounds, 2.5 assists, 1.4 steals and 1.8 blocks per game.

Wesley re-joined the Breakers for the 2015–16 NBL season and was experimented at the centre position after he improved his fitness and lowered his weight during the off-season. He started the season in good form before missing time in November 2015 with appendicitis. He helped the Breakers return to the NBL Grand Final series, where they lost 2–1 to the Perth Wildcats. In 26 games, he averaged 11.7 points, 4.8 rebounds and 1.8 assists per game.

For the 2016 New Zealand NBL season, Wesley joined the Wellington Saints. He earned back-to-back Finals MVP honors after leading the Saints to the championship with a 94–82 win over the Super City Rangers in the grand final. In 16 games, he averaged 15.0 points, 6.4 rebounds, 3.0 assists, 1.9 steals and 1.5 blocks per game. With the Saints in 2017, he helped the team win back-to-back championships while earning a personal three-peat. In 17 games, he averaged 19.5 points, 8.0 rebounds, 3.5 assists and 1.2 steals per game. Wesley initially re-signed with the Saints for the 2018 season, but ultimately did not re-join the team.

=== Melbourne United (2016–2018) ===
On May 27, 2016, Wesley signed a two-year deal with Melbourne United. He clashed with head coach Dean Demopoulos during the 2016–17 NBL season, which led to Wesley considering retirement at the end of the season. He averaged 8.8 points and 3.5 rebounds per game, which included games where he played only two or three minutes a game.

Wesley was Melbourne's starting power forward in 2017–18 under new coach Dean Vickerman and earned All-NBL Second Team honors. In March 2018, he helped United defeat the Adelaide 36ers 3–2 in the NBL Grand Final series to claim his second Australian NBL championship. He appeared in all 35 games in 2017–18, averaging 11.5 points, 5.4 rebounds, 2.8 assists and 1.1 blocks per game.

=== Return to the Breakers (2018–2019) ===
On May 15, 2018, Wesley signed a one-year deal with the New Zealand Breakers, returning to the club for a second stint and on the final year of his status as a non-restricted player. During pre-season, Wesley suffered what was his seventh broken nose in his career. He appeared in all 28 games for the Breakers in 2018–19, averaging 14.5 points, 5.4 rebounds, 3.6 assists and 1.1 blocks per game.

=== Brujos de Guayama (2019) ===
Following the NBL season, Wesley moved to Puerto Rico to play for Brujos de Guayama of the Baloncesto Superior Nacional. In 24 games, he averaged 15.8 points, 6.4 rebounds, 2.9 assists and 1.3 blocks per game.

=== South East Melbourne Phoenix (2019–2020) ===
On April 1, 2019, Wesley signed a three-year deal with the South East Melbourne Phoenix, a new franchise entering the NBL. For the 2019–20 season, he was reclassified as an import player. While his debut game for the Phoenix marked his 150th in the NBL, he also injured his hamstring which ruled him out for nine weeks.

On July 7, 2020, Wesley announced his retirement from basketball.

== National team career ==
Wesley represented the Guam national basketball team. In July 2015, he helped Guam win gold at the Pacific Games in Papua New Guinea. In November 2018, he played for Guam in the 2021 FIBA Asia Cup pre-qualifiers in Thailand. In Thailand, he played alongside his two older brothers, Mekeli and Russell, for the first time in an official tournament.

In February 2023, Wesley helped Guam qualify for the 2025 FIBA Asia Cup qualifiers.

== Personal ==
Wesley is of Rotuman and Samoan descent. He is the younger brother of former Brigham Young standout Mekeli Wesley, Utah Valley State graduate Russell Wesley, and 2003 all-state selection Tika Wesley.

Wesley and his wife Chyna have three children.

Between 2014 and 2018, Wesley was allowed to play in Australia and New Zealand as a non-restricted player under the now defunct "Oceania rule". In April 2018, the Australian NBL granted Wesley another year as a local in order for him to begin the process of becoming naturalised.
