= Marcel Jones (basketball) =

American/New Zealand basketball player (born 1985)

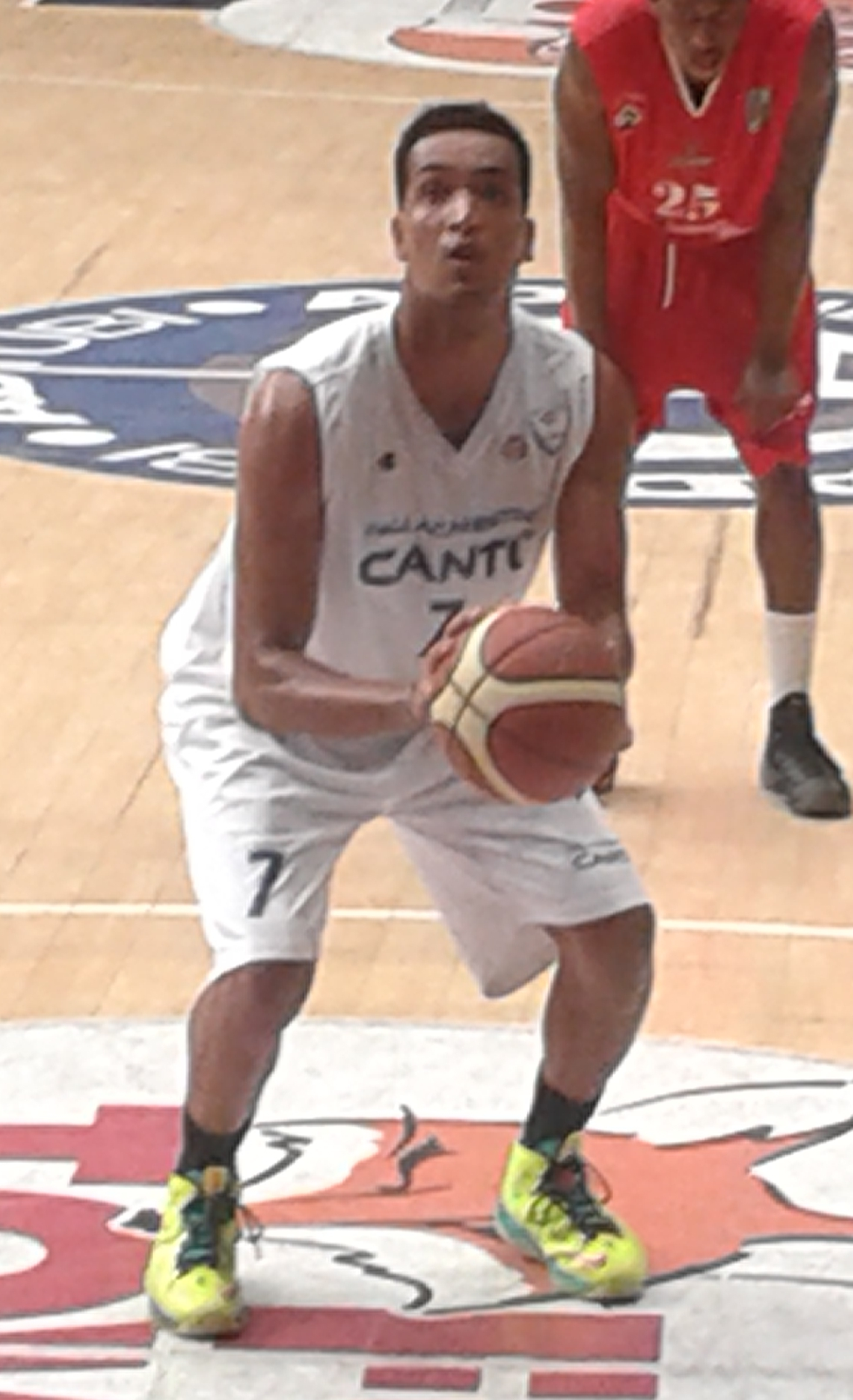
- Jones with Pallacanestro Cantù in 2013

No. 3 – Taranaki Airs
- Position: Small forward / power forward
- League: NZNBL

Personal information
- Born: September 2, 1985 (age 41) Los Angeles, California, U.S.
- Listed height: 6 ft 8 in (2.03 m)
- Listed weight: 218 lb (99 kg)

Career information
- High school: Mater Dei (Santa Ana, California)
- College: Oregon State (2004–2008)
- NBA draft: 2008: undrafted
- Playing career: 2008–present

Career history
- 2008: Iowa Energy
- 2009: Manawatu Jets
- 2009: Kauhajoen Karhu
- 2009: Espoon Honka
- 2009: Falco KC Szombathely
- 2010: Everton Tigers
- 2010: Wellington Saints
- 2010–2011: Al-Wahda Damascus
- 2011–2012: Zrinjski Mostar
- 2012: Manawatu Jets
- 2012–2013: BCM U Piteşti
- 2013: Manawatu Jets
- 2013–2014: Pallacanestro Cantù
- 2014: Canterbury Rams
- 2014–2015: Akhisar Belediye
- 2015: Pallacanestro Biella
- 2015–2016: Bashkimi Prizren
- 2016: Canterbury Rams
- 2016: Sigal Prishtina
- 2016–2017: Helios Suns
- 2017: Canterbury Rams
- 2017–2018: Al-Riffa
- 2018: Super City Rangers
- 2018–2019: Al-Ahli
- 2019: Southern Huskies
- 2019–2020: Al-Ittihad Jeddah
- 2020–2023: Taranaki Mountainairs/Airs
- 2020–2021: Al-Ittihad Manama
- 2021–2022: Sitra Club
- 2022: Al Qadsia
- 2022: Malvín
- 2023: Manawatu Jets
- 2024: Mayrouba Club
- 2025: Franklin Bulls
- 2026–present: Taranaki Airs

Career highlights
- NBL Kiwi MVP (2016); NBL Most Outstanding Forward (2016); 2× NBL Most Outstanding Kiwi Forward/Centre (2016, 2017); 3× NBL All-Star Five (2016, 2017, 2020); 2× NBL rebounding champion (2019, 2020); Romanian Supercup champion (2013); Romanian League All-Star (2013); British League champion (2010)

Marcel Xavier Jones (born September 2, 1985) is an American-New Zealand professional basketball player. He played college basketball for the Oregon State Beavers between 2004 and 2008 before embarking on a professional career that spanned across the globe, from Europe and the Middle East, to his adoptive home of New Zealand. Since 2009, Jones has had consistent yearly stints in the New Zealand NBL, largely due to gaining New Zealand citizenship in 2012. He also played consistently in the Persian Gulf region between 2017 and 2022.

== High school career ==
Jones attended Mater Dei High School in Santa Ana, California, where he was a four-year letterman for head coach Gary McKnight. As a sophomore in 2001–02, he averaged 8.4 points and 4.3 rebounds per game. As a junior in 2002–03, he averaged 10.8 points and 5.3 rebounds per game, helping Mater Dei to the CIF title with a 35–2 record. As a senior in 2003–04, he averaged 20.0 points, 6.7 rebounds and 2.4 assists per game, helping Mater Dei to a 24–5 record and the Sierra League title. He finished his high school career as a three-time All-CIF and All-Sierra League honoree.

== College career ==
As a freshman at Oregon State in 2004–05, Jones played in 21 games with five starts and averaged 3.9 points and 1.9 rebounds in 9.8 minutes per game. He posted season highs of 14 points and 32 minutes, as well as eight rebounds, against Georgia.

As a sophomore in 2005–06, Jones was one of only two players to appear in all 31 games (starting 21), averaging 9.2 points in 28.3 minutes.

As a junior in 2006–07, Jones led the team in scoring (15.3 points, eighth in the Pac-10) and steals (1.5, fourth in the Pac-10), and finished second in rebounding (5.7, 15th in the Pac-10). He was one of two players to start all 32 games and registered 1,000 minutes exactly (31.3 per game). His 49 steals were the most by a Beaver since 1999–00, and he had a stretch of 20 straight games with a steal. He scored a career-high 35 points against Northern Colorado, becoming the first Beaver to score at least 30 points in a game since January 2000. Following the season, Jones put his name on the early-entry list for the 2007 NBA draft, but decided to return for his senior season.

Jones was the only senior player on the 2007–08 Beavers roster. During the season, he became just the 34th Beaver to score 1,000 career points, finishing his career with 1,166. In 30 games, he averaged 10.4 points, 5.7 rebounds and 1.1 assists per game.

== Professional career ==
=== 2008–09 season ===
After going undrafted in the 2008 NBA draft, Jones played for the Chicago Bulls in the Orlando Summer League, where he averaged 4.6 points and 3.6 rebounds in five games. On November 7, he was selected by the Iowa Energy in the fourth round of the 2008 NBA Development League Draft. On December 24, he was waived by the Energy after appearing in just two games. He went on to play for the Manawatu Jets during the 2009 New Zealand NBL season, earning Player of the Week honors for Round 8 and averaging 27.3 points (second in the league), 9.8 rebounds, 1.6 assists and 1.6 steals in 16 games.

=== 2009–10 season ===
After initially signing in Germany, Jones joined Finnish club Kauhajoen Karhu. He appeared in seven games for Karhu in October before having a one-game stint with Espoon Honka on November 7. He then had a five-game stint with Hungarian club Falco KC Szombathely between November 21 and December 19.

On March 4, 2010, Jones signed with the Everton Tigers for the rest of the 2009–10 British Basketball League season. The Tigers went on to win the BBL play-offs. In 14 games, he averaged 5.8 points and 2.4 rebounds per game.

On May 28, 2010, Jones signed with the Wellington Saints as injury cover for Eric Devendorf. In five games during the 2010 New Zealand NBL season, he averaged 7.2 points and 2.6 rebounds in 12.8 minutes per game.

=== 2010–11 season ===
During the 2010–11 season, Jones played in Syria for Al-Wahda. He lived in the Syrian capital of Damascus and said he was fortunate to play there before civil war broke out. Jones regularly played in front of 4,000 fans, including military personnel, at home games. In eight games for the club between November 26 and January 3, he averaged 12.8 points, 6.1 rebounds and 1.3 assists per game.

=== 2011–12 season ===
On August 26, 2011, Jones signed with HKK Zrinjski Mostar of Bosnia for the 2011–12 season. In 24 Bosnian League games, he averaged 14.0 points, 8.0 rebounds, 1.3 assists and 2.2 steals per game. He also averaged 15.2 points, 13.0 rebounds, 1.0 assists and 2.2 steals in nine Balkan League games.

On April 20, 2012, Jones played for the Manawatu Jets as an injury replacement for Dustin Mitchell. He was thrown into a starting role for the Jets and he provided them with the spark they needed to beat the Otago Nuggets 103–79, recording 22 points, 12 rebounds and seven assists. While it was his first game for the Jets, he had arrived in New Zealand in March, a mere three days after playing in his final game for Zrinjski. However, he was unable to play for the Jets because they already had their quota of two imports playing in Mitchell and Josh Pace. He appeared in five games for the Jets between April 20 and May 4 before Chris Hagan permanently replaced Mitchell on May 5. Jones was relegated to the sidelines due to his citizenship application still being processed. On May 20, with import duo Hagan and Pace being rested, Jones was able to play in the Jets' regular-season finale, scoring a game-high 25 points in a 78–69 loss to the Hawke's Bay Hawks. In six games for the Jets, he averaged 22.3 points, 9.8 rebounds, 3.5 assists and 1.7 steals per game.

=== 2012–13 season ===
In July 2012, Jones signed with BCM U Piteşti of Romania for the 2012–13 season. He went on to earn league All-Star honors and helped the club win the Romanian Supercup title. In 27 games for Piteşti, he averaged 15.6 points, 5.6 rebounds, 1.5 assists and 2.0 steals per game.

Following the conclusion of the Romanian League season, Jones re-joined the Manawatu Jets for the 2013 New Zealand NBL season. Despite having gained New Zealand citizenship, he had to play as an import for the Jets due to a league rule which allows only one naturalized New Zealand player per team; team captain Nick Horvath already filled that spot. In his season debut on May 4, Jones scored 13 points in 32½ minutes in a 107–77 loss to the Wellington Saints. In 13 games for the Jets in 2013, he averaged 20.2 points, 7.5 rebounds, 1.8 assists and 1.1 steals per game.

=== 2013–14 season ===
On August 27, 2013, Jones signed with Pallacanestro Cantù of Italy for the 2013–14 season. On April 28, 2014, he parted ways with the club in order to return to New Zealand. In 25 league games for Cantù, he averaged 3.4 points and 1.4 rebounds per game. He also played in 16 Eurocup games, averaging 6.3 points and 3.3 rebounds per game.

On May 1, 2014, Jones signed with the Canterbury Rams for the rest of the 2014 New Zealand NBL season. He made his debut for the Rams the next day, scoring 11 points off the bench in a 91–89 loss to the Hawke's Bay Hawks. In 12 games for the Rams, Jones averaged 15.8 points, 7.7 rebounds, 2.2 assists and 1.2 steals per game.

=== 2014–15 season ===
In October 2014, Jones signed with Akhisar Belediye of Turkey for the 2014–15 season. In 28 games for Akhisar, he averaged 13.2 points, 8.4 rebounds, 1.5 assists and 1.8 steals per game.

=== 2015–16 season ===
On August 5, 2015, Jones signed with Pallacanestro Biella of the Italian Serie A2 Basket for the 2015–16 season. On October 28, he parted ways with Biella after appearing in four games. He subsequently joined Bashkimi Prizren of the Kosovo Basketball Superleague in November. In seven league games for Bashkimi, he averaged 22.9 points, 8.6 rebounds, 2.0 assists and 2.3 steals per game. He also played in seven Balkan League games, averaging 21.6 points, 8.0 rebounds, 2.9 assists and 2.6 steals per game.

On February 27, 2016, Jones signed with the Canterbury Rams for the 2016 New Zealand NBL season, returning to the club for a second stint. In the team's season opener on March 11, Jones recorded team highs of 22 points and 11 rebounds in a 100–86 win over the Nelson Giants. He missed the team's next game against the Taranaki Mountainairs on March 17 due to a groin strain. With Jones absent, the Rams were defeated 71–69 by the Mountainairs. He returned to action for the team's next game on March 25, recording 13 points, six rebounds and three assists in a 98–94 win over the Southland Sharks. He missed his second game of the season on April 8 with groin, hamstring and calf muscle issues. Jones returned to action for the team's next game on April 15, recording 22 points and 11 rebounds in a 97–72 win over the Wellington Saints. On April 25, he recorded a season-high 33 points and 12 rebounds (equal season high at the time) in a 95–85 win over the Giants. He subsequently earned Player of the Week honors for Round 7. On May 8, he recorded 30+ points for the fourth time in five games, and with 10 rebounds, he had his seventh double-double of the season, helping the Rams defeat the Hawke's Bay Hawks 95–82. He subsequently earned Player of the Week honors for Round 9. On May 19, he recorded 22 points and a season-high 15 rebounds in a 71–65 win over the Mountainairs. Jones helped the Rams claim the minor premiership with a first-place finish and a 13–5 record. In their semi-final match-up, the Rams were outclassed by the fourth-seeded Super City Rangers, losing 104–85 despite a 17-point effort from Jones. In 17 games for the Rams in 2016, he averaged 23.1 points, 9.5 rebounds, 1.8 assists, 1.4 steals and 1.1 blocks per game. He subsequently won the NBL's Kiwi MVP, Most Outstanding Forward and Most Outstanding Kiwi Forward/Centre, and earned NBL All-Star Five honors.

=== 2016–17 season ===
On October 23, 2016, Jones signed with Sigal Prishtina of the Kosovo Superleague, returning to the league for a second stint. On December 8, 2016, he left Prishtina after appearing in 12 games and signed with Slovenian club Helios Suns for the rest of the 2016–17 season. In 10 games for Helios, he averaged 15.5 points, 5.0 rebounds, 1.4 assists and 1.0 steals per game.

In March 2017, Jones re-joined the Canterbury Rams ahead of the 2017 New Zealand NBL season. In the Rams' season opener on March 18, Jones had 22 points and eight rebounds in a 114–107 loss to the Super City Rangers. The following day, he recorded game highs of 33 points, 10 rebounds and four steals in a 99–87 overtime win over the Hawke's Bay Hawks. On April 25, he recorded a season-high 41 points and 12 rebounds in a 106–89 win over Hawke's Bay. In late May, coach Mark Dickel changed the makeup of his starting five by relegating Jones to a bench role. Dickel's decision was defensive-minded as he looked to morph the team into a more balanced outfit ahead of the playoffs. The Rams finished the regular season in fourth place with a 10–8 record, and lost to the first-seeded Wellington Saints 94–73 in their semi-final match-up. Jones scored 10 points in the loss. Jones appeared in all 19 games for the Rams in 2017, averaging 21.8 points, 8.9 rebounds and 2.7 assists per game. He was subsequently named Most Outstanding Kiwi Forward/Centre and All-Star Five for the second straight year.

=== 2017–18 season ===
In October 2017, Jones signed with Al-Riffa of the Bahraini Premier League. In 23 games, he averaged 30.8 points, 16.7 rebounds, 3.4 assists, 2.4 steals and 1.0 blocks per game.

In May 2018, he joined the Super City Rangers for the 2018 New Zealand NBL season. In his debut for the Rangers on May 12, Jones recorded 21 points and 13 rebounds in a 124–121 loss to the Manawatu Jets. On June 24, he recorded 30 points and 14 rebounds in a 103–84 win over the Taranaki Mountainairs. On July 19, he recorded 24 points and a season-high 18 rebounds in a 92–68 loss to the Hawke's Bay Hawks. In the Rangers' season finale on July 29, Jones scored a season-high 34 points in a 109–99 win over the Jets. In 15 games, he averaged 23.8 points, 10.3 rebounds, 2.4 assists and 1.4 steals per game.

=== 2018–19 season ===
In October 2018, Jones signed with Al-Ahli of the Bahraini Premier League. In 17 league games, he averaged 28.4 points, 16.8 rebounds, 4.0 assists, 1.2 steals and 1.3 blocks per game. He also averaged 21.5 points, 12.3 rebounds, 3.3 assists and 2.5 steals in four games during the FIBA Asia Champions Cup GBA Qualifiers.

On March 25, 2019, Jones signed with the Southern Huskies for the 2019 New Zealand NBL season. In his debut for the Huskies on May 4, Jones scored a game-high 28 points in a 91–86 loss to the Wellington Saints. On May 26, he had 17 rebounds to go with 15 points in an 89–83 win over the Manawatu Jets. On May 31, he recorded 25 points and 15 rebounds in a 114–90 win over the Taranaki Mountainairs. On June 2, he recorded 27 points and 17 rebounds in a 108–104 win over the Super City Rangers. He was subsequently named Player of the Week for Round 8. In 14 games, he averaged 20.5 points, 11.2 rebounds, 2.1 assists and 1.9 steals per game.

=== 2019–20 season ===
In September 2019, Jones signed with Al-Ittihad Jeddah of the Saudi Premier League. He averaged 20 points and 11 rebounds per game during the 2019–20 season.

In June 2020, Jones was acquired by the Taranaki Mountainairs for the 2020 New Zealand NBL season. He recorded a double-double in eight of the first nine games. He finished the regular season with 10 double-doubles in 14 games, and finished first in rebounds per game (13.4) and second in points per game (22.1). He subsequently earned NBL All-Star Five honours for the third time. In Taranaki's semi-final, Jones recorded 25 points, 13 rebounds and six assists in a 105–95 loss to the Manawatu Jets.

=== 2020–21 season ===
In December 2020, Jones signed with Al-Ittihad Manama of the Bahraini Premier League. On January 1, 2021, he recorded 51 points and 29 rebounds in a 114–106 win over Isa Town. In seven games, he averaged 36.1 points, 20.9 rebounds, 3.9 assists, 1.3 steals and 1.3 blocks per game.

On April 2, 2021, Jones re-signed with the Taranaki Mountainairs for the 2021 New Zealand NBL season. On July 3, he recorded 39 points and 15 rebounds in a 101–99 loss to the Franklin Bulls. In 17 games, he averaged 23.2 points, 9.6 rebounds, 3.8 assists, 1.7 steals and 1.1 blocks per game.

=== 2021–22 season ===
In October 2021, Jones joined Sitra Club of the Bahraini Premier League. After averaging 32.7 points, 17.5 rebounds, 4.6 assists, 1.8 steals and 1 block in 10 games, he joined Al Qadsia in Kuwait in March 2022.

On May 14, 2022, Jones re-signed with the Taranaki Airs for the 2022 New Zealand NBL season. He helped the Airs win the minor premiership with a first-place finish a 12–6 record. In 14 games, he averaged 12.6 points, 7.2 rebounds, 1.8 assists and 1.3 steals per game.

=== 2022–23 season ===
In October 2022, Jones joined Malvín of the Liga Uruguaya de Básquetbol. He left the team in November after appearing in five games.

On January 17, 2023, Jones re-signed with the Taranaki Airs for the 2023 New Zealand NBL season. He parted ways with the Airs on May 17, 2023. He averaged 6.4 points and 6.2 rebounds in five games.

On May 27, 2023, Jones signed with the Manawatu Jets for the rest of the New Zealand NBL season, returning to the team for a fourth stint.

=== 2023–24 season ===
In February 2024, Jones joined Mayrouba Club of the Lebanese Basketball League for the rest of the 2023–24 season. In six games, he averaged 19.0 points, 10.2 rebounds and 2.7 assists per game.

=== 2024–25 season ===
In March 2025, Jones signed with the Franklin Bulls for the 2025 New Zealand NBL season. In 21 games, he averaged 7.1 points and 4.3 rebounds per game.

=== 2025–26 season ===
On March 1, 2026, Jones signed with the Taranaki Airs for the 2026 New Zealand NBL season.

== Personal life ==
Jones is the son of Marie and Michael Jones, and has two brothers, Matthew and Mason. He is married to a New Zealander and their daughter was born in 2013.

Jones has appeared in various movies such as The Princess Diaries, Beautiful and Big Momma's House, as well as television shows such as Even Stevens, Smart Guy and One on One.

In March 2012, Jones applied for New Zealand citizenship to be able to play as a local in the National Basketball League and have the opportunity to represent the Tall Blacks in international competition. In June 2012, he received his citizenship.
