= 2017 New Zealand NBL season =

- League: New Zealand NBL
- Sport: Basketball
- Duration: 16 March – 17 June
- Games: 18
- Teams: 7

Regular season
- Minor premiers: Wellington Saints
- Season MVP: Corey Webster (Wellington Saints)
- Top scorer: Corey Webster (Wellington Saints)

Final Four
- Champions: Wellington Saints
- Runners-up: Southland Sharks
- Finals MVP: Shea Ili

New Zealand NBL seasons
- ← 2016 2018 →

The 2017 NBL season was the 36th season of the National Basketball League. For the second year in a row, the league fielded seven teams.

The regular season commenced on Thursday 16 March in Invercargill with the Southland Sharks hosting the Nelson Giants at Stadium Southland. The season contained 13 weeks of regular season games followed by a Final Four weekend in June at Tauranga's ASB BayPark Arena. The seven teams played every team on three occasions to make up an 18-game round robin season.

With an 18–0 record, the Wellington Saints made NBL history by becoming the first team to complete a perfect regular season. They went on to post a perfect 20–0 campaign after sweeping the Final Four and collecting their 10th NBL championship in the process.

== Team information ==
Team	City	Arena	Colours	Head coach	Import	Import
Canterbury Rams	Christchurch	Cowles Stadium		(New Zealand) Mark Dickel	(United States) Jeremy Kendle	(United States) McKenzie Moore
Hawke's Bay Hawks	Napier	Pettigrew Green Arena		(New Zealand) Ben Hill	(United States) Kareem Johnson	(United States) Amir Williams
Nelson Giants	Nelson	Trafalgar Centre		(New Zealand) Brendon Bailey	(Australia) Kyle Adnam	(United States) Morgan Grim
Southland Sharks	Invercargill	Stadium Southland		(New Zealand) Judd Flavell	(Australia) Nick Kay	(Australia) Mitch Norton
Super City Rangers	Auckland	The Trusts Arena		(New Zealand) Jeff Green	(United States) Nnanna Egwu	(Australia) Mitch McCarron
Taranaki Mountainairs	New Plymouth	TSB Stadium		(New Zealand) Trent Adam	(Senegal) Daniel Gomis	(Kenya) Tylor Ongwae
Wellington Saints	Wellington	TSB Bank Arena		(United States) Kevin Braswell	(Australia) Josh Duinker	

== Summary ==
=== Regular season standings ===
Pos
Pos	Team	W	L
1	Wellington Saints	18	0
2	Southland Sharks	12	6
3	Super City Rangers	11	7
4	Canterbury Rams	10	8
5	Hawke's Bay Hawks	4	14
6	Nelson Giants	4	14
7	Taranaki Mountainairs	4	14

=== Final Four ===
Semi-finals
1	Wellington Saints	94
4	Canterbury Rams	73
2	Southland Sharks	106
3	Super City Rangers	67

Final
Wellington Saints	108
Southland Sharks	75

== Awards ==
=== Player of the Week ===
Round	Player	Team	Ref
1	Marcel Jones	Canterbury Rams	
2	Jeremy Kendle	Canterbury Rams	
3	Corey Webster	Wellington Saints	
4	Corey Webster	Wellington Saints	
5	Corey Webster	Wellington Saints	
6	Leon Henry	Wellington Saints	
7	Marcel Jones	Canterbury Rams	
8	Corey Webster	Wellington Saints	
9	Nick Kay	Southland Sharks	
10	McKenzie Moore	Canterbury Rams	
11	McKenzie Moore	Canterbury Rams	
12	Tai Wesley	Wellington Saints	
13	Jeremy Kendle	Canterbury Rams	

=== Statistics leaders ===
Stats as of the end of the regular season

Category	Player	Team	Stat
Points per game	Corey Webster	Wellington Saints	26.0
Rebounds per game	Amir Williams	Hawke's Bay Hawks	10.2
Assists per game	Jarrod Kenny	Hawke's Bay Hawks	7.5
Steals per game	Dillon Boucher	Super City Rangers	2.4
Blocks per game	Amir Williams	Hawke's Bay Hawks	1.7

=== Regular season ===
- Most Valuable Player: Corey Webster (Wellington Saints)
- NZ Most Valuable Player: Corey Webster (Wellington Saints)
- Most Outstanding Guard: Corey Webster (Wellington Saints)
- Most Outstanding NZ Guard: Corey Webster (Wellington Saints)
- Most Outstanding Forward: Tai Wesley (Wellington Saints)
- Most Outstanding NZ Forward/Centre: Marcel Jones (Canterbury Rams)
- Scoring Champion: Corey Webster (Wellington Saints)
- Rebounding Champion: Amir Williams (Hawke's Bay Hawks)
- Assist Champion: Jarrod Kenny (Hawke's Bay Hawks)
- Coach of the Year: Kevin Braswell (Wellington Saints)
- All-Star Five:
  - G: Shea Ili (Wellington Saints)
  - G: Corey Webster (Wellington Saints)
  - F: Mitch McCarron (Super City Rangers)
  - F: Marcel Jones (Canterbury Rams)
  - C: Tai Wesley (Wellington Saints)

=== Final Four ===
- Finals MVP: Shea Ili (Wellington Saints)
