= Torrey Craig =

American basketball player (born 1990)

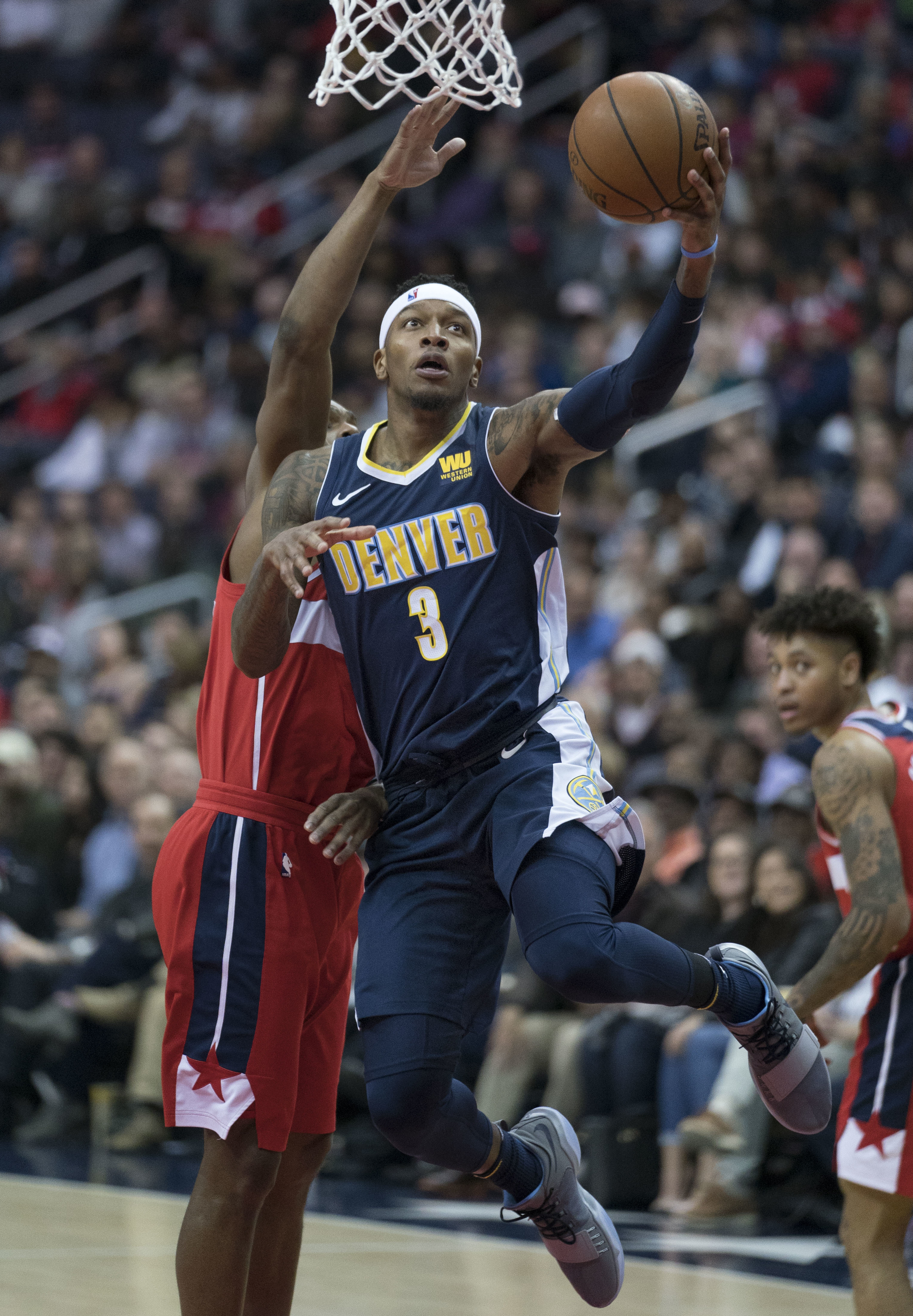
- Craig with the Denver Nuggets in 2018

No. 2 – Sydney Kings
- Position: Small forward
- League: NBL

Personal information
- Born: December 19, 1990 (age 35) Columbia, South Carolina, U.S.
- Listed height: 6 ft 6 in (198 cm)
- Listed weight: 209 lb (95 kg)

Career information
- High school: Great Falls (Great Falls, South Carolina)
- College: USC Upstate (2010–2014)
- NBA draft: 2014: undrafted
- Playing career: 2014–present

Career history
- 2014–2016: Cairns Taipans
- 2015–2016: Wellington Saints
- 2016–2017: Brisbane Bullets
- 2017: Gold Coast Rollers
- 2017–2020: Denver Nuggets
- 2017–2018: →Sioux Falls Skyforce
- 2020–2021: Milwaukee Bucks
- 2021: Phoenix Suns
- 2021–2022: Indiana Pacers
- 2022–2023: Phoenix Suns
- 2023–2025: Chicago Bulls
- 2025: Boston Celtics
- 2026–present: Sydney Kings
- 2026: Mets de Guaynabo

Career highlights
- NBL champion (2026); NBL Best Defensive Player (2017); All-NBL Second Team (2017); NZNBL champion (2016); NZNBL MVP (2015); NZNBL Most Outstanding Guard (2015); 2× NZNBL All-Star Five (2015, 2016); AP honorable mention All-American (2012); Atlantic Sun Player of the Year (2012); 3× First-team All-Atlantic Sun (2012–2014); Atlantic Sun Freshman of the Year (2011)
- Stats at NBA.com
- Stats at Basketball Reference

Torrey Craig (born December 19, 1990) is an American professional basketball player for the Sydney Kings of the National Basketball League (NBL). He played college basketball for the USC Upstate Spartans, where he was named an honorable mention All-American and Atlantic Sun Conference Player of the Year in 2012.

After graduating from USC Upstate in 2014, Craig spent his first three professional seasons in Australia and New Zealand. He was named New Zealand NBL MVP and won a New Zealand NBL championship with the Wellington Saints, and earned NBL Best Defensive Player honors with the Brisbane Bullets. In 2017, he began his NBA career with the Denver Nuggets. He has also played for the Milwaukee Bucks, Phoenix Suns, Indiana Pacers, Chicago Bulls, and Boston Celtics.

In 2026, after joining the Sydney Kings in the middle of the season, Craig helped the team win the NBL championship.

== Early life ==
Craig was born in Columbia, South Carolina, and raised in Great Falls, South Carolina. His mother, Teresa Mays, was imprisoned on drug charges when Craig was aged 5; she was released from jail when he was 21. His father was not part of his life. Craig was primarily raised by his grandmother, Daisy Mays, and his eldest sister, Sacha. He played basketball using a hoop that was mounted on a wooden streetlight. His grandmother died when Craig was in the eighth grade and Sacha became his legal guardian. Sacha arranged for him to move in with her where she was stationed at MacDill Air Force Base until two local coaches offered for Craig to live with them so he could stay in Great Falls and attend Great Falls High School. Craig was selected as the Class 1A Player of the Year in South Carolina during his senior season and led Great Falls to back-to-back state championship game appearances.

== College career ==
Craig played college basketball for the USC Upstate Spartans. As a freshman, Craig entered the starting lineup and quickly made an impact, averaging 14.4 points and 7.2 rebounds per game en route to winning Atlantic Sun Conference Freshman of the Year honors.

In his sophomore season, Craig led the A-Sun in scoring at 16.4 points per game and helped the Spartans win 21 games. Craig was named the conference Player of the Year and an honorable mention All-American by the Associated Press. As a junior, Craig once again led the A-Sun in scoring at 17.2 points per game. He was named first team All-Atlantic Sun.

Prior to the start of his senior season, Craig was named preseason Player of the Year in the Atlantic Sun. On February 10, 2014, Craig reached the 2,000 career point milestone with a 22-point game against East Tennessee State.

== Professional career ==
=== Cairns Taipans and Wellington Saints (2014–2016) ===
On August 6, 2014, Craig signed with the Cairns Taipans in Australia for the 2014–15 NBL season. Head coach Aaron Fearne encouraged Craig to focus on his defensive abilities which initially left him dissatisfied until he realised that he had the capacity to guard any assignment. He was named NBL Player of the Week for Round 9 after recording 19 points and 10 rebounds against the Adelaide 36ers on December 6. On December 19, he scored a season-high 28 points in a 90–86 loss to the 36ers. He helped the Taipans finish the season in first place with a 21–7 record before going on to reach the grand final series, where they lost 2–0 to the New Zealand Breakers. In 32 games, he averaged 8.9 points, 5.7 rebounds and 1.2 assists per game.

Following the 2014–15 NBL season, Craig joined the Wellington Saints for the 2015 New Zealand NBL season. On April 17, he scored 41 points against the Taranaki Mountainairs, ending the game one point shy of the all-time Saints scoring record, held by Mike Efevberha with 42. He was named Player of the Week for Round 3 after also recording 25 points and 14 rebounds against the Southland Sharks on April 18. He was again named Player of the Week for Round 11. He missed the end of the regular season with a knee injury. He helped the Saints reach the grand final, where they lost to the Sharks 72–68. For the season, he was named the NZNBL MVP and was named to the NZNBL All-Star Five. In 17 games, he averaged 20.4 points, 9.1 rebounds, 1.8 assists, 1.0 steals and 1.2 blocks per game.

On August 7, 2015, Craig re-signed with the Cairns Taipans for the 2015–16 NBL season. On October 24, 2015, he recorded 18 points and 10 rebounds in a loss to Melbourne United. On January 13, 2016, in another loss to United, Craig became the first Taipans player to have at least 20 points and 15 rebounds in a game since Nathan Jawai did so in 2008. The Taipans missed the playoffs in 2015–16 with a 12–16 record. Craig appeared in all 28 games, averaging 11.6 points, 6.1 rebounds, 1.0 assists and 1.1 blocks per game.

Following the 2015–16 NBL season, Craig re-joined the Wellington Saints for the 2016 New Zealand NBL season. He was twice named Player of the Week. He helped the Saints reach the grand final, where they defeated the Super City Rangers 94–82 to win the championship, with Craig scoring 15 points. He appeared in all 20 games for the Saints in 2016, averaging 20.9 points, 9.8 rebounds, 2.9 assists and 1.3 steals per game. He subsequently earned NZNBL All-Star Five honors for the second straight year.

=== Brisbane Bullets and Gold Coast Rollers (2016–2017) ===
On May 9, 2016, Craig signed a two-year deal with the Brisbane Bullets, a team re-joining the NBL for the 2016–17 season after an eight-year hiatus. He made his debut for the Bullets in their season opener on October 6, scoring a team-high 16 points in a 72–65 win over the Perth Wildcats. Two days later, he had 17 rebounds in a 77–73 win over the Sydney Kings. On November 19, he scored a career-high 34 points in a 105–87 win over the Adelaide 36ers. In the Bullets' season finale on February 11, 2017, Craig had 30 points and 18 rebounds in a 106–79 loss to the Illawarra Hawks. He became just the second player in eight years to have 30 points and 18 rebounds in a game. The Bullets finished the season at the bottom of the ladder with a 10–18 record. For the season, Craig was named the NBL Best Defensive Player and earned All-NBL Second Team honors. Craig appeared in all 28 games for the Bullets in 2016–17, averaging 15.2 points, 8.0 rebounds, 1.5 assists and 1.1 steals per game.

Following the 2016–17 NBL season, Craig joined the Gold Coast Rollers of the Queensland Basketball League. He scored 30 points or more five times, including two 40-point games. He was named Player of the Week for Round 3. In 10 games for the Rollers, he averaged 28.2 points, 9.9 rebounds, 4.0 assists, 1.5 steals and 1.0 blocks per game.

=== Denver Nuggets and Sioux Falls Skyforce (2017–2020) ===
During his Bullets tenure, Craig was recommended to Tim Connelly, president of basketball operations for the Denver Nuggets, by his brother, Joe, the former coach of the Sydney Kings. Connelly gave Craig the chance to earn a contract, and Craig returned to the United States to join the Nuggets for NBA Summer League. On July 19, 2017, he signed a two-way contract with the Nuggets. On the two-way deal, Craig spent most of the season in the NBA G League with the Sioux Falls Skyforce due to the 45-day limit he could spend with the Nuggets. Craig made his NBA debut on November 28, 2017, in the Nuggets' 106–77 loss to the Utah Jazz, joining Mike Gibson as the only players in Upstate history to play in an NBA game. Craig made his first career start on December 15, 2017, against the New Orleans Pelicans, scoring six points in a 117–111 overtime win. Three days later, he scored a season-high 14 points in a 95–94 loss to the Oklahoma City Thunder. On April 1, 2018, he recorded seven points and a season-high eight rebounds in a 128–125 overtime win over the Milwaukee Bucks.

On July 10, 2018, Craig signed a two-year, $4 million contract with the Nuggets. On February 1, 2019, he scored a then career-high 22 points in a 136–122 win over the Houston Rockets. In game four of the Nuggets' first-round playoff series against the San Antonio Spurs, Craig scored 18 points with five 3-pointers in a 117–103 win.

On March 1, 2020, Craig scored a season-high 17 points against the Toronto Raptors. In the COVID affected 2019–20 NBA season, Craig averaged 5.4 points and 3.3 rebounds during the regular season and once again proved his worth while checking some of the NBA's best wings during the postseason.

On November 17, 2020, the Nuggets extended Craig a $2.5 million qualifying offer to make him a restricted free agent. They withdrew the qualifying offer four days later, thus making him an unrestricted free agent.

=== Milwaukee Bucks (2020–2021) ===
On November 26, 2020, Craig signed with the Milwaukee Bucks.

=== Phoenix Suns (2021) ===
On March 18, 2021, Craig was traded to the Phoenix Suns in exchange for cash considerations. On April 25, 2021, he had 20 points and 14 rebounds off the bench against the Brooklyn Nets. In the 2021 NBA Finals against his former team the Milwaukee Bucks, he averaged 2.8 points and 1.3 rebounds across the six games. The Suns lost the series 4–2.

=== Indiana Pacers (2021–2022) ===
On August 20, 2021, Craig signed with the Indiana Pacers. On October 29, 2021, he scored a career-high 28 points, to go with 11 rebounds, in a loss to the Brooklyn Nets.

=== Return to Phoenix (2022–2023) ===
On February 10, 2022, Craig was traded back to the Phoenix Suns in exchange for Jalen Smith and a 2022 second-round draft pick.

Craig returned to the Suns for the 2022–23 season.

=== Chicago Bulls (2023–2025) ===
On July 16, 2023, Craig signed with the Chicago Bulls. On February 3, 2025, he was waived by the Bulls.

=== Boston Celtics (2025) ===
On February 8, 2025, Craig signed with the Boston Celtics.

=== Sydney Kings and Mets de Guaynabo (2026–present) ===
On January 14, 2026, Craig signed with the Sydney Kings of the National Basketball League (NBL) for the rest of the 2025–26 season. He helped the Kings win the 2026 NBL championship. In 15 games to finish the season, including the playoffs, Craig averaged 12.4 points and 5.4 rebounds per game, shooting 40% from 3-point range while also playing a substantial role on the defensive end.

On April 28, 2026, Craig joined the Mets de Guaynabo of the Baloncesto Superior Nacional (BSN).

On June 16, 2026, Craig re-signed with the Kings for the 2026–27 NBL season.

== National team ==
Craig played for the United States men's national basketball team during the 2027 FIBA Basketball World Cup Americas qualifiers.

== Personal life ==
Craig's son, Braylon, was born on June 4, 2014.

He was in a relationship with rapper, Megan Thee Stallion.

Craig took early steps to obtain Australian citizenship during his tenure with the Brisbane Bullets so he could join the Australia national team but his plans were deferred when he joined the NBA.

== NBA career statistics ==
Legend
GP	Games played	GS	Games started	MPG	Minutes per game
FG%	Field goal percentage	3P%	3-point field goal percentage	FT%	Free throw percentage
RPG	Rebounds per game	APG	Assists per game	SPG	Steals per game
BPG	Blocks per game	PPG	Points per game	**Bold**	Career high

=== Regular season ===
Year	Team	GP	GS	MPG	FG%	3P%	FT%	RPG	APG	SPG	BPG	PPG
2017–18	Denver	39	5	16.1	.453	.293	.629	3.3	.6	.3	.4	4.2
2018–19	Denver	75	37	20.0	.442	.324	.700	3.5	1.0	.5	.6	5.7
2019–20	Denver	58	27	18.5	.461	.326	.611	3.3	.8	.4	.6	5.4
2020–21	Milwaukee	18	0	11.2	.391	.364	.500	2.4	.9	.5	.4	2.5
2020–21	Phoenix	32	8	18.8	**.503**	.369	**.800**	4.8	1.0	.6	.6	7.2
2021–22	Indiana	51	14	20.3	.456	.333	.771	3.8	1.1	.5	.4	6.5
2021–22	Phoenix	27	2	20.8	.450	.323	.706	4.3	1.2	**.8**	.6	6.9
2022–23	Phoenix	**79**	**60**	**24.7**	.456	.395	.711	**5.4**	**1.5**	.6	**.8**	**7.4**
2023–24	Chicago	53	14	19.8	.430	.392	.750	4.1	1.1	.6	.4	5.7
2024–25	Chicago	9	1	12.6	.489	**.429**	.750	2.8	.6	.2	.1	6.9
2024–25	Boston	17	3	11.8	.356	.290	.625	2.8	.7	.4	.6	2.7
Career		458	171	19.5	.452	.354	.701	3.9	1.0	.5	.6	5.9

=== Playoffs ===
Year	Team	GP	GS	MPG	FG%	3P%	FT%	RPG	APG	SPG	BPG	PPG
2019	Denver	14	**11**	**23.6**	.478	.472	.563	**5.1**	**.9**	**.5**	**.4**	**6.6**
2020	Denver	19	3	19.7	.423	.262	.692	3.3	.7	.4	**.4**	4.5
2021	Phoenix	**22**	0	12.1	.427	.405	.615	2.9	.4	.0	**.4**	4.0
2022	Phoenix	9	0	7.6	.364	.300	.500	1.7	.6	.4	.2	2.2
2023	Phoenix	11	5	16.7	**.578**	.440	**.889**	2.3	.5	**.5**	.2	6.5
2025	Boston	5	0	4.2	.500	**.667**	–	1.0	.6	.2	.0	1.2
Career		80	19	15.6	.457	.386	.660	3.0	.6	.3	.3	4.5
