= Adrian Majstrovich =

New Zealand-Australian basketball player

Personal information
- Born: 9 February 1980 (age 46) Tūrangi, New Zealand
- Listed height: 201 cm (6 ft 7 in)
- Listed weight: 100 kg (220 lb)

Career information
- High school: Morley Senior (Perth, Western Australia)
- Playing career: 1996–2016
- Position: Forward

Career history
- 1996: East Perth Eagles
- 1997–1998: Australian Institute of Sport
- 1998–2000: Perth Wildcats
- 1999: East Perth Eagles
- 2001: Brisbane Bullets
- 2001: Launceston Tigers
- 2001–2002: TUS Jena
- 2002–2003: UKJ SUBA St.Polten
- 2003–2006: Hawke's Bay Hawks
- 2004–2005: Perth Wildcats
- 2005–2006: New Zealand Breakers
- 2006–2007: Adelaide 36ers
- 2007: Wellington Saints
- 2008: Auckland Stars
- 2008: U-Mobitelco Cluj-Napoca
- 2009–2010: Kalamunda Eastern Suns
- 2011–2012: Perth Redbacks
- 2013: Perry Lakes Hawks
- 2014: Goldfields Giants
- 2015: Southland Sharks
- 2016: Stirling Senators

Career highlights
- NBL champion (2000); 2× NZNBL champion (2006, 2015); NZNBL Most Valuable Player (2004); NZNBL Rookie of the Year (2003); 2× SBL All-Star Five (2009, 2010); 2× SBL scoring champion (2010, 2011)

Adrian "A. J." Majstrovich (born 9 February 1980) is a New Zealand-Australian former professional basketball player. He played six seasons in the Australian National Basketball League (NBL), winning an NBL championship with the Perth Wildcats in 2000. In the New Zealand NBL, he won two championships (2006 and 2015) and league MVP in 2004.

== Early life and career ==
Majstrovich was born in Tūrangi, New Zealand, to Croatian parents, and was raised in Carnarvon, Western Australia, on his grandparents' banana plantation. He later moved to Perth, where he attended Morley Senior High School. In 1996, he made his debut in the State Basketball League (SBL) for the East Perth Eagles. In 1997, he moved to Canberra to attend the Australian Institute of Sport (AIS), where he played for the AIS men's team in the South East Australian Basketball League (SEABL). He also represented Australia at Under 20 level from 1996 to 1999, making him ineligible for the Tall Blacks.

== Professional career ==
=== Early NBL years (1998–2001) ===
In 1998, Majstrovich joined the Perth Wildcats of the Australian National Basketball League (NBL). He played two seasons for the Wildcats, winning an NBL championship in 2000.

In January 2001, Majstrovich joined the Brisbane Bullets, where he played four games to finish the 2000–01 NBL season.

During the 1999 NBL off-season, Majstrovich played for the East Perth Eagles in the SBL. During the 2001 NBL off-season, he played for the Launceston Tigers in the SEABL.

=== First overseas stint (2001–2003) ===
Between 2001 and 2003, Majstrovich played one season in Germany for TUS Jena and one season in Austria for UKJ SUBA St.Polten.

=== Return to NBL and first stint in NZNBL (2003–2008) ===
In 2003, Majstrovich made his debut in the New Zealand NBL for the Hawke's Bay Hawks. He was named Rookie of the Year in his first season before going on to earn the MVP award in 2004.

For the 2004–05 NBL season, Majstrovich re-joined the Perth Wildcats. He then returned to the Hawke's Bay Hawks for the 2005 New Zealand NBL season. He joined the New Zealand Breakers for the 2005–06 NBL season, but appeared in just 12 games due to a season-ending leg injury.

With the Hawke's Bay Hawks in the 2006 New Zealand NBL season, Majstrovich won the NZNBL championship. He then joined the Adelaide 36ers for the 2006–07 NBL season.

Majstrovich played for the Wellington Saints in 2007 and the Auckland Stars in 2008.

=== Romania (2008) ===
For the 2008–09 season, Majstrovich moved to Romania to play for Tab Baldwin at U-Mobitelco Cluj-Napoca. His stint ended in December 2008 after appearing in three league games and two EuroChallenge games.

=== SBL and NZNBL (2009–2016) ===
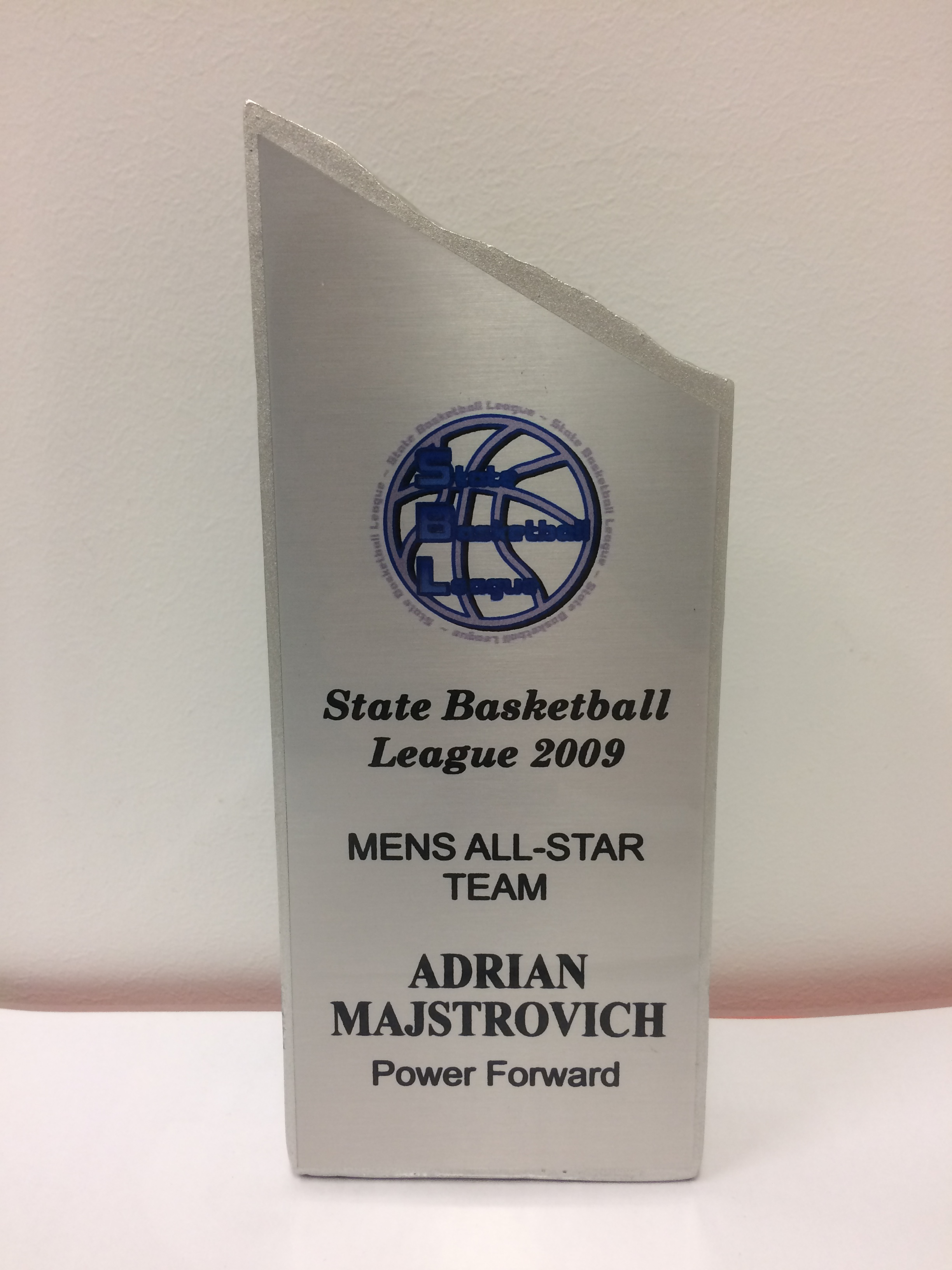
Majstrovich's 2009 All-Star Team trophy

Majstrovich joined the Kalamunda Eastern Suns for the 2009 State Basketball League season. In 26 games, he averaged 27.31 points, 12.35 rebounds and 3.15 assists per game. He continued on with the Suns in the 2010 season. For the 2011 SBL season, he joined the Perth Redbacks. He re-joined the Redbacks for the 2012 season. For the 2013 SBL season, he joined the Perry Lakes Hawks.

Majstrovich was set to join the Nelson Giants for the 2014 New Zealand NBL season, but a foot injury ruled him out. He later joined the Goldfields Giants midway through the 2014 SBL season.

Majstrovich joined the Southland Sharks for the 2015 New Zealand NBL season and helped them win the NZNBL championship.

For the 2016 SBL season, Majstrovich joined the Stirling Senators.

== Personal life ==
Majstrovich is the son of Maja and Ozren, and has an older brother named Ivan. Majstrovich is married to wife Jaime.

In 2009, Majstrovich returned to Perth to study for a career as a civil draughtsman.
