= New Zealand NBL Most Valuable Player Award =

The National Basketball League Most Valuable Player (MVP) is an annual National Basketball League (NBL) award given since the 2003 New Zealand NBL season to the best performing player of the regular season. At the end of each season, the player with the most votes is awarded the Most Valuable Player for that season. Prior to the 2003 season, only a Kiwi MVP was awarded as a way of recognising the best performing New Zealander.

== Winners ==
Year	Player	Nationality	Team
2003	David Cooper	Australia	Manawatu Jets
2004	Adrian Majstrovich	New Zealand	Hawke's Bay Hawks
2005	Lindsay Tait	New Zealand	Auckland Stars
2006	Paora Winitana	New Zealand	Hawke's Bay Hawks
2007	Josh Pace	United States	Nelson Giants
2008	Jason Crowe	United States	Waikato Pistons
2009	Phill Jones	New Zealand	Nelson Giants
2010	Lindsay Tait (2)	New Zealand	Wellington Saints
2011	Alex Pledger	New Zealand	Waikato Pistons
2012	Nick Horvath	New Zealand	Manawatu Jets
2013	Lindsay Tait (3)	New Zealand	Wellington Saints
2014	Corey Webster	New Zealand	Wellington Saints
2015	Torrey Craig	United States	Wellington Saints
2016	McKenzie Moore	United States	Canterbury Rams
2017	Corey Webster (2)	New Zealand	Wellington Saints
2018	Shea Ili	New Zealand	Wellington Saints
2019	Nick Kay	Australia	Wellington Saints
2020	Tom Vodanovich	New Zealand	Manawatu Jets
2021	Dion Prewster	New Zealand	Wellington Saints
2022	Xavier Cooks	Australia	Wellington Saints
2023	Robert Loe	New Zealand	Auckland Tuatara
2024	Lachlan Olbrich	Australia	Canterbury Rams
2025	Josiah Allick	United States	Southland Sharks
2026	Elijah Pepper	Australia	Wellington Saints

== See also ==
- List of National Basketball League (New Zealand) awards
