= Dillon Boucher =

New Zealand basketball player

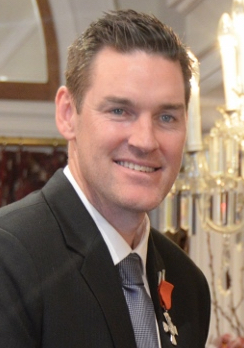
- Boucher in 2014

Personal information
- Born: 27 December 1975 (age 50) Bell Block, Taranaki, New Zealand
- Listed height: 196 cm (6 ft 5 in)
- Listed weight: 98 kg (216 lb)

Career information
- High school: Papatoetoe (Auckland, New Zealand)
- Playing career: 1994–2018
- Position: Small forward / power forward

Career history
- 1994–2001: Auckland Rebels/Stars
- 2002–2003: Waikato Titans
- 2003–2005: New Zealand Breakers
- 2004–2009: Auckland Stars
- 2005–2006: Perth Wildcats
- 2006–2008: Brisbane Bullets
- 2008–2013: New Zealand Breakers
- 2010: Harbour Heat
- 2011–2012: Auckland Pirates
- 2013: Wellington Saints
- 2014–2018: Super City Rangers

Career highlights
- 9× NZNBL champion (1995–1997, 1999, 2000, 2002, 2004, 2005, 2012); NZNBL Final MVP (2005); NZNBL Kiwi MVP (2003); 3× NZNBL All-Star Five (2002, 2003, 2007); 4× NBL champion (2007, 2011–2013); NBL Best Defensive Player (2010); No. 24 retired by New Zealand Breakers
Medals
Men's basketball
Representing New Zealand
Commonwealth Games
Silver medal – second place	2006 Melbourne	Team competition

Dillon Matthew Boucher MNZM (born 27 December 1975) is a New Zealand former professional basketball player. His 13 combined career championships is the most in ANBL/NZNBL history.

== Early life ==
Growing up in Bell Block, a small township just outside of New Plymouth, Boucher picked up basketball in his final year at Bell Block Primary School, thanks in large part to his older brothers. Boucher continued to play the sport through high school, spending his third-form year at New Plymouth's Spotswood College in 1989 before relocating to Auckland in 1990 and attending Papatoetoe High School. While he enjoyed playing basketball, it was when he was selected for his first New Zealand age-group squad, around the age of 17, he saw the potential to make a career out of it.

== Professional career ==
Boucher played for the New Zealand Breakers in the Australian National Basketball League from their inception in 2003 until 2005 when he signed with the Perth Wildcats for whom he played for in 2005/06. Boucher then played for the Brisbane Bullets between 2006 and 2008. In 2008, he re-joined the New Zealand Breakers and was part of the team's championship three-peat between 2010/11 and 2012/13. Boucher retired from the Breakers and the Australian NBL in 2013. The Breakers retired his number 24.

With the Auckland Pirates in 2012, Boucher won his ninth NZNBL championship. Prior to 2011, he played for the Auckland Stars, Waikato Titans and Harbour Heat. He played for the Wellington Saints in 2013, before joining the Super City Rangers in 2014. He was player/assistant with the Rangers in 2015. In November 2015, he re-signed with the Rangers on a three-year deal, continuing on as a player/assistant coach. On 4 May 2017, Boucher became the second player to reach 400 NBL games, joining Phill Jones (406). On 5 June 2017, he played his 409th career NBL game, surpassing Jones as the all-time leader.

On 12 July 2018, Boucher announced that the 2018 season would be his last in the New Zealand NBL. He finished his career with 426 NBL games.

== Off the court ==
In 2016, Boucher became the New Zealand Breakers' general manager. In September 2019, he quit as general manager of the Breakers.

In November 2020, Boucher was appointed Director of Basketball for the Auckland Huskies in the New Zealand NBL.

In September 2021, Boucher was appointed CEO of Basketball New Zealand.

In March 2025, Boucher was appointed president of basketball operations of the New Zealand Breakers.

== National team career ==
Boucher made his first Tall Blacks team in 2001. He was part of the squad who shocked the hoops world to claim fourth place at the 2002 FIBA World Championship. Following his national team call up, Boucher became a fixture in the side until his retirement from the international level in 2008.

== Personal ==
In the 2014 Queen's Birthday Honours, Boucher was appointed a Member of the New Zealand Order of Merit for services to basketball.
