= 2015 New Zealand NBL season =

- League: New Zealand NBL
- Sport: Basketball
- Duration: 1 April – 5 July
- Games: 18
- Teams: 8

Regular season
- Minor premiers: Southland Sharks
- Season MVP: Torrey Craig (Wellington Saints)
- Top scorer: Aaron Fuller (Taranaki Mountainairs)

Final Four
- Champions: Southland Sharks
- Runners-up: Wellington Saints
- Finals MVP: Tai Wesley

New Zealand NBL seasons
- ← 2014 2016 →

The 2015 NBL season was the 34th season of the National Basketball League. The season draw was supposed to be released in December 2014, but the withdrawal of Otago and Waikato prompted a rethink for the 2015 competition format. In the past, each team played each other twice in a 10-team competition, meaning each franchise had nine home games. However, with two fewer teams in 2015, it was decided the new format would be played over two and half rounds to keep incomes at a similar rate for the remaining sides. Each team was scheduled to play each other twice and play three of the sides in a third game.

The 2015 pre-season tournament was held at the Te Rauparaha Arena in Porirua on Saturday 21 March and Sunday 22 March. The Wellington Saints were the only team to go undefeated over the two days, finishing with a 3–0 record. The regular season commenced on Wednesday 1 April in Invercargill with the Southland Sharks hosting the Manawatu Jets at Stadium Southland.

In the regular-season finale on Sunday 28 June, Taranaki Mountainairs import Aaron Fuller set the National Basketball League record for points scored in a game. With 54 points, Fuller broke John Whorton's record of 50 points, which was set in 2003. Despite Fuller's 54 points and 19 rebounds, the Mountainairs lost to the Super City Rangers to finish the season with a winless record (0–18). The 2015 Mountainairs side joined the 1998 Northland Suns, 2009 Mountainairs and 2010 Otago Nuggets as the only sides in NBL history to go an entire season without a win.

The Final Four weekend was held in Wellington for the fourth time in five years, with the semifinals on Saturday 4 July, followed by the championship game on Sunday 5 July.

== Team information ==
Team	City	Arena	Head coach	Import	Import
Canterbury Rams	Christchurch	Cowles Stadium	(New Zealand) Mark Dickel	(United States) Mickell Gladness	(United States) Jermaine Taylor
Hawke's Bay Hawks	Napier	Pettigrew Green Arena	(New Zealand) Paora Winitana	(United States) Zack Atkinson	(Nigeria) Suleiman Braimoh
Manawatu Jets	Palmerston North	Arena Manawatu	(New Zealand) Darron Larsen	(United States) Dion Harris	(United States) Brandon Jenkins
Nelson Giants	Nelson	Saxton Stadium	(United States) Tim Fanning	(United States) McKenzie Moore	(United States) DeRonn Scott
Southland Sharks	Invercargill	Stadium Southland	(New Zealand) Paul Henare	(Australia) Todd Blanchfield	(United States) Kevin Braswell
Super City Rangers	Auckland	Otara Recreation Centre	(New Zealand) Jeff Green	(Australia) Jason Cadee	(Australia) Tom Garlepp
Taranaki Mountainairs	New Plymouth	TSB Stadium	(New Zealand) Daryn Shaw	(United States) Aaron Fuller	(United States) Chris Hagan
Wellington Saints	Wellington	TSB Bank Arena	(New Zealand) Pero Cameron	(United States) Torrey Craig	(Australia) Daniel Johnson

== Summary ==
=== Regular season standings ===
Pos
Pos	Team	W	L
1	Southland Sharks	15	3
2	Nelson Giants	13	5
3	Wellington Saints	12	6
4	Super City Rangers	11	7
5	Canterbury Rams	9	9
6	Manawatu Jets	6	12
7	Hawke's Bay Hawks	6	12
8	Taranaki Mountainairs	0	18

=== Final Four ===
Semi-finals
1	Southland Sharks	95
4	Super City Rangers	80
2	Nelson Giants	85
3	Wellington Saints	97

Final
Southland Sharks	72
Wellington Saints	68

== Awards ==
=== Player of the Week ===
Round	Player	Team	Ref
1	Lindsay Tait	Wellington Saints	
2	Tai Wesley	Southland Sharks	
2	Aaron Fuller	Taranaki Mountainairs	
3	Torrey Craig	Wellington Saints	
4	Suleiman Braimoh	Hawke's Bay Hawks	
5	McKenzie Moore	Nelson Giants	
6	McKenzie Moore	Nelson Giants	
7	Tom Garlepp	Super City Rangers	
8	Todd Blanchfield	Southland Sharks	
9	Kevin Braswell	Southland Sharks	
10	McKenzie Moore	Nelson Giants	
11	Tai Wesley	Southland Sharks	
11	Torrey Craig	Wellington Saints	
12	Luke Aston	Hawke's Bay Hawks	
13	Aaron Fuller	Taranaki Mountainairs	

=== Statistics leaders ===
Stats as of the end of the regular season

Category	Player	Team	Stat
Points per game	Aaron Fuller	Taranaki Mountainairs	28.4
Rebounds per game	Jeremiah Trueman	Manawatu Jets	12.4
Assists per game	Lindsay Tait	Wellington Saints	8.9
Steals per game	Chris Hagan	Taranaki Mountainairs	2.7
Blocks per game	Mickell Gladness	Canterbury Rams	2.3

=== Regular season ===
- Most Valuable Player: Torrey Craig (Wellington Saints)
- NZ Most Valuable Player: Lindsay Tait (Wellington Saints)
- Most Outstanding Guard: Torrey Craig (Wellington Saints)
- Most Outstanding NZ Guard: Lindsay Tait (Wellington Saints)
- Most Outstanding Forward: Tai Wesley (Southland Sharks)
- Most Outstanding NZ Forward/Centre: Josh Duinker (Nelson Giants)
- Scoring Champion: Aaron Fuller (Taranaki Mountainairs)
- Rebounding Champion: Jeremiah Trueman (Manawatu Jets)
- Assist Champion: Lindsay Tait (Wellington Saints)
- Rookie of the Year: Josh Duinker (Nelson Giants)
- Coach of the Year: Paul Henare (Southland Sharks)
- All-Star Five:
  - G: McKenzie Moore (Nelson Giants)
  - G: Torrey Craig (Wellington Saints)
  - F: Todd Blanchfield (Southland Sharks)
  - F: Tai Wesley (Southland Sharks)
  - C: Aaron Fuller (Taranaki Mountainairs)

=== Final Four ===
- Finals MVP: Tai Wesley (Southland Sharks)
