= 2019 New Zealand NBL season =

- League: New Zealand NBL
- Sport: Basketball
- Duration: 11 April – 21 July
- Games: 18
- Teams: 9

Regular season
- Minor premiers: Wellington Saints
- Season MVP: Nick Kay (Wellington Saints)
- Top scorer: Tim Quarterman (Super City Rangers)

Final Four
- Champions: Wellington Saints
- Runners-up: Hawke's Bay Hawks
- Grand Final MVP: Thomas Abercrombie

New Zealand NBL seasons
- ← 2018 2020 →

The 2019 NBL season was the 38th season of the National Basketball League. The competition increased to nine teams in 2019 with the Southern Huskies joining the league for the first time, marking the first time ever that an Australian team has joined a New Zealand competition.

The regular season commenced on Thursday 11 April in Palmerston North with the Manawatu Jets hosting the Super City Rangers at Arena Manawatu. The season contained 14 weeks of regular season games followed by a Final Four weekend in July. The Saints won their 11th NBL championship in 2019 behind their second 20–0 campaign in three seasons.

== Team information ==
Team	City	Arena	Colours	Head coach	Import	Import	Import
Canterbury Rams	Christchurch	Cowles Stadium		(Australia) Mick Downer	(Australia) Cameron Gliddon	(Australia) Emmett Naar	(United States) Isaiah Wilkins
Hawke's Bay Hawks	Napier	Pettigrew Green Arena		(New Zealand) Zico Coronel	(United States) Brandon Bowman	(Australia) Daniel Kickert	(United States) E. J. Singler
Manawatu Jets	Palmerston North	Arena Manawatu		(New Zealand) Tim McTamney	(United States) Wally Ellenson	(United States) Kuran Iverson	(United States) Daishon Knight
Nelson Giants	Nelson	Trafalgar Centre		(New Zealand) Michael Fitchett	(Australia) Daniel Grida	(United States) Jordair Jett	(Australia) Rhys Vague
Southern Huskies	Tasmania, Australia	Derwent Entertainment Centre / Silverdome		(Australia) Anthony Stewart	(United States) Jalen Billups	(United States) Tre Nichols	
Southland Sharks	Invercargill	Stadium Southland		(New Zealand) Judd Flavell	(Australia) Todd Blanchfield	(United States) Roberto Nelson	(Australia) Jarrad Weeks
Super City Rangers	Auckland	Massey Leisure Centre / AUT Sport & Fitness Centre		(New Zealand) Jeff Green	(United States) Nnanna Egwu	(Australia) Venky Jois	(United States) Tim Quarterman
Taranaki Mountainairs	New Plymouth	TSB Stadium		(New Zealand) Dave Bublitz	(United States) Justin Cousin	(United States) Chris Early	
Wellington Saints	Wellington	TSB Bank Arena		(New Zealand) Paul Henare	(Australia) Sunday Dech	(Australia) Nick Kay	

== Summary ==
=== Regular season standings ===
Pos	Team	W	L	Qualification
1	Wellington Saints	18	0	Final Four
2	Hawke's Bay Hawks	14	4	Final Four
3	Canterbury Rams	13	5	Final Four
4	Southland Sharks	12	6	Final Four
5	Southern Huskies	9	9	
6	Nelson Giants	7	11	
7	Super City Rangers	3	15	
8	Taranaki Mountainairs	3	15	
9	Manawatu Jets	2	16	

Source: New Zealand National Basketball League

=== Final Four ===
Semi Finals
1	Wellington Saints	95
4	Southland Sharks	89
2	Hawke's Bay Hawks	74
3	Canterbury Rams	68

Final
Wellington Saints	78
Hawke's Bay Hawks	68

== Awards ==
=== Player of the Week ===
Round	Player	Team	Ref
1	Ethan Rusbatch	Hawke's Bay Hawks	
2	Jalen Billups	Southern Huskies	
3	Robert Loe	Wellington Saints	
4	Wally Ellenson	Manawatu Jets	
5	Jarrad Weeks	Southland Sharks	
6	E. J. Singler	Hawke's Bay Hawks	
7	Tim Quarterman	Super City Rangers	
8	Marcel Jones	Southern Huskies	
9	Tim Quarterman	Super City Rangers	
10	Nick Kay	Wellington Saints	
11	Thomas Abercrombie	Wellington Saints	
12	Brandon Bowman	Hawke's Bay Hawks	
13	Jarrad Weeks	Southland Sharks	
14	Jarrod Kenny	Hawke's Bay Hawks	

=== Team of the Week ===
Round	Team					Ref
1	Mitch McCarron Sharks	Ethan Rusbatch Hawks	E. J. Singler Hawks	Nick Kay Saints	Venky Jois Rangers	
2	Tre Nichols Huskies	Ethan Rusbatch (2) Hawks	Craig Moller Huskies	Jalen Billups Huskies	Michael Karena Rams	
3	Jordair Jett Giants	Shea Ili Saints	Kevin Foster Mountainairs	Robert Loe Saints	Rhys Vague Giants	
4	Jarrad Weeks Sharks	Shea Ili (2) Saints	Tim Quarterman Rangers	Chris Early Mountainairs	Wally Ellenson Jets	
5	Jarrad Weeks (2) Sharks	Jordair Jett (2) Giants	Daishon Knight Jets	Tim Quarterman (2) Rangers	Kuran Iverson Jets	
6	Tim Quarterman (3) Rangers	E. J. Singler (2) Hawks	Brandon Bowman Hawks	Jordan Ngatai Saints	Nick Kay (2) Saints	
7	Ethan Rusbatch (3) Hawks	Tim Quarterman (4) Rangers	E. J. Singler (3) Hawks	Jalen Billups (2) Huskies	Daniel Kickert Hawks	
8	Roberto Nelson Sharks	Tim Quarterman (5) Rangers	Marcel Jones Huskies	Brandon Bowman (2) Hawks	Nnanna Egwu Rangers	
9	Tim Quarterman (6) Rangers	Todd Blanchfield Sharks	Ethan Rusbatch (4) Hawks	Brandon Bowman (3) Hawks	Rhys Vague (2) Giants	
10	Derone Raukawa Mountainairs	Todd Blanchfield (2) Sharks	Daishon Knight (2) Jets	Nick Kay (3) Saints	Brandon Bowman (4) Hawks	
11	Daishon Knight (3) Jets	Wally Ellenson (2) Jets	Thomas Abercrombie Saints	Venky Jois (2) Rangers	Nnanna Egwu (2) Rangers	
12	Shea Ili (3) Saints	Emmett Naar Rams	Hyrum Harris Sharks	Nick Kay (4) Saints	Brandon Bowman (5) Hawks	
13	Jarrad Weeks (3) Sharks	Jarrod Kenny Hawks	Cameron Gliddon Rams	Brandon Bowman (6) Hawks	Taane Samuel Jets	
14	Jarrod Kenny (2) Hawks	Jordair Jett (3) Giants	Marcel Jones (2) Huskies	Jalen Billups (3) Huskies	Tyrell Harrison Giants	

=== Statistics leaders ===
Stats as of the end of the regular season

Category	Player	Team	Stat
Points per game	Tim Quarterman	Super City Rangers	28.0
Rebounds per game	Venky Jois	Super City Rangers	11.5
Assists per game	Jarrod Kenny	Hawke's Bay Hawks	6.8
Steals per game	Tim Quarterman	Super City Rangers	3.3
Blocks per game	Nnanna Egwu	Super City Rangers	1.9

=== Regular season ===
- Most Valuable Player: Nick Kay (Wellington Saints)
- Most Outstanding Guard: Cameron Gliddon (Canterbury Rams)
- Most Outstanding NZ Guard: Shea Ili (Wellington Saints)
- Most Outstanding Forward: Nick Kay (Wellington Saints)
- Most Outstanding NZ Forward/Centre: Robert Loe (Wellington Saints)
- Scoring Champion: Tim Quarterman (Super City Rangers)
- Rebounding Champion: Marcel Jones (Southern Huskies) (Note: The NBL officially announced Marcel Jones as the rebounding champion and recipient of the Garry Pettis Award for 2019, despite Venky Jois of the Super City Rangers averaging 11.5 rebounds per game (13 games) compared to Jones' 11.2 per game (14 games).)
- Assist Champion: Jarrod Kenny (Hawke's Bay Hawks)
- Golden Hands: Nick Kay (Wellington Saints)
- Most Improved Player: Ethan Rusbatch (Hawke's Bay Hawks)
- Defensive Player of the Year: Isaiah Wilkins (Canterbury Rams)
- Youth Player of the Year: Tyrell Harrison (Nelson Giants)
- Coach of the Year: Mick Downer (Canterbury Rams)
- All-Star Five:
  - G: Shea Ili (Wellington Saints)
  - G: Cameron Gliddon (Canterbury Rams)
  - F: E. J. Singler (Hawke's Bay Hawks)
  - F: Nick Kay (Wellington Saints)
  - C: Brandon Bowman (Hawke's Bay Hawks)

=== Final Four ===
- Grand Final MVP: Thomas Abercrombie (Wellington Saints)
