= Nick Kay =

Australian basketball player (born 1992)

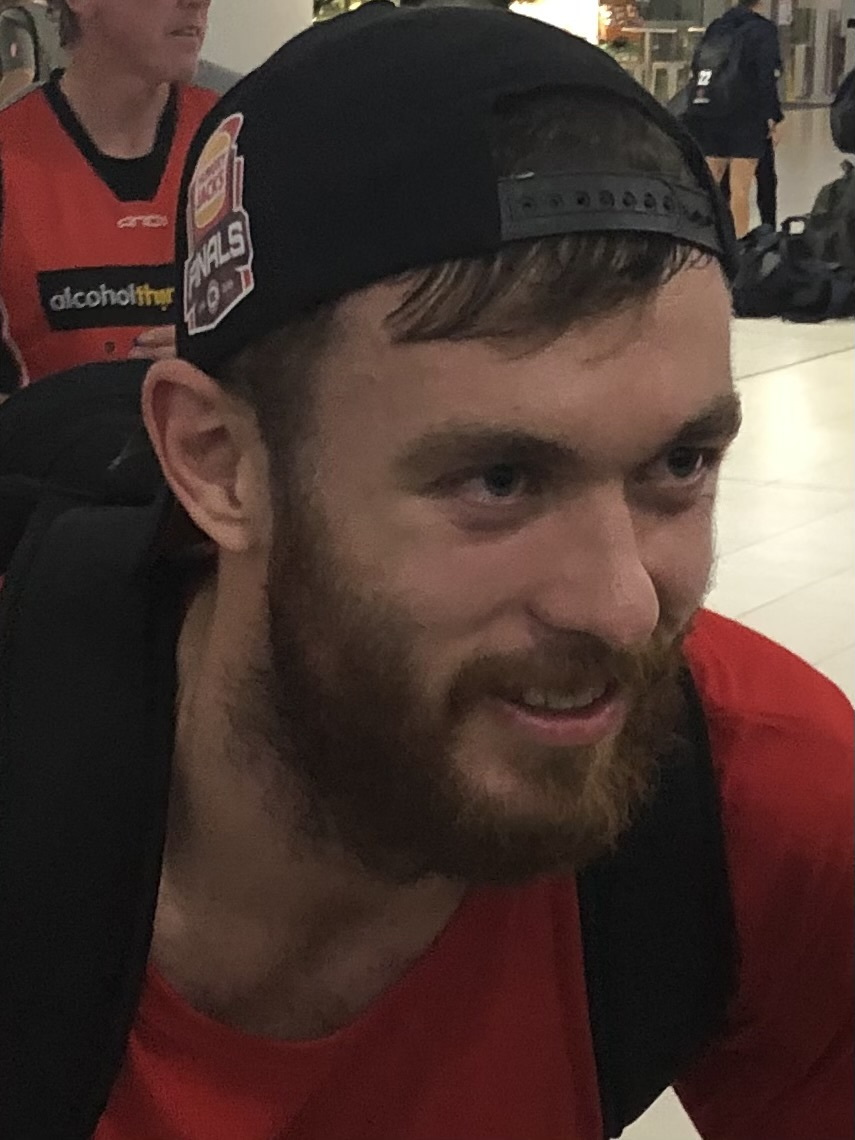
- Kay with the Perth Wildcats in 2019

No. 4 – Shimane Susanoo Magic
- Position: Power forward / center
- League: B.League

Personal information
- Born: 3 August 1992 (age 34) Tamworth, New South Wales, Australia
- Listed height: 206 cm (6 ft 9 in)
- Listed weight: 106 kg (234 lb)

Career information
- High school: McCarthy Catholic College (Tamworth, New South Wales); Newington College (Sydney, New South Wales)
- College: Metro State (2011–2015)
- NBA draft: 2015: undrafted
- Playing career: 2014–present

Career history
- 2014–2015: Northside Wizards
- 2015–2016: Townsville Crocodiles
- 2016–2017: Southland Sharks
- 2016–2018: Illawarra Hawks
- 2018–2020: Perth Wildcats
- 2019: Wellington Saints
- 2020–2021: Real Betis
- 2021–present: Shimane Susanoo Magic

Career highlights
- 2× NBL champion (2019, 2020); 2× All-NBL First Team (2019, 2020); NZNBL champion (2019); NZNBL MVP (2019); NZNBL All-Star Five (2019); NZNBL Most Outstanding Forward (2019); NBL Rookie of the Year (2016); 2× First-team All-RMAC (2014, 2015); Third-team All-RMAC (2013); RMAC Tournament MVP (2014); Gaze Medal (2019)
Medals
Men's basketball
Representing Australia
Olympic Games
Bronze medal – third place	2020 Tokyo	Team
Commonwealth Games
Gold medal – first place	2018 Gold Coast	Team
FIBA Asia Cup
Gold medal – first place	2017 Lebanon

Nicholas Colin Kay (born 3 August 1992) is an Australian professional basketball player for Shimane Susanoo Magic of the Japanese B.League. He played college basketball for the Metro State Roadrunners before beginning his professional career in the National Basketball League (NBL). He won two NBL championships with the Perth Wildcats in 2019 and 2020. He also won a New Zealand NBL championship and league MVP honours with the Wellington Saints in 2019. In 2021, he won a bronze medal with the Australian national team at the Tokyo Olympics.

== Early life ==
Kay was born and raised in Tamworth, New South Wales, where he attended McCarthy Catholic College and played for the Tamworth Thunderbolts. At age 17, he moved to Sydney to attend Newington College. He averaged 13 points and 14 rebounds for Newington, leading the school to finish second in Australia's all-schools tournament and won the New South Wales all-school tournament. He also represented the New South Wales state team.

== College career ==
In 2011, Kay moved to the United States to play college basketball for the Metropolitan State University of Denver in the NCAA Division II.

As a freshman in 2011–12, Kay played in all 32 games for the Roadrunners, making 15 starts and averaging 6.5 points and 5.6 rebounds per game. He became the first Metro State freshman since 1995 to record a double-double on debut, recording 14 points and 13 rebounds in a start against Bemidji State on 11 November 2011. He had a season-high 24 points against Colorado Christian on 7 January 2012.

As a sophomore in 2012–13, Kay was named third-team all-RMAC after leading Metro State to the national title game and the RMAC regular season and tournament championships. He started 33 of 34 games and averaged 10.7 points, 5.6 rebounds and 1.4 steals per game. He had a season-high 19 points three times. He had 10 points and seven rebounds in the national championship game loss to Drury.

As a junior in 2013–14, Kay started all 34 games and helped the Roadrunners to the RMAC regular season and tournament championships and the semi-finals at the NCAA tournament. He averaged 15.9 points, 7.4 rebounds, 1.9 assists, 1.7 steals and 1.0 blocks per game, and was named NABC first team all-district and first-team all-RMAC. He had a season-high 24 points against UC-Colorado Springs on 1 March 2014, helping Metro State finish the regular season as the third team in RMAC history to go undefeated. He was named the most valuable player of the RMAC Tournament.

As a senior in 2014–15, Kay started all 32 games and averaged 20.4 points, 7.7 rebounds, 2.4 assists and 1.4 steals per game. He was named NABC first team all-district and first-team all-RMAC for the second straight year. He led the Roadrunners to their third consecutive RMAC regular season championship and a fourth-straight appearance in the NCAA tournament. He scored a career-high 33 points against Arkansas-Fort Smith on 15 November 2014. He had a career-high 17 rebounds along with 21 points against CSU-Pueblo on 27 February 2015.

== Professional career ==
=== Northside Wizards (2014–2015) ===
In 2014, in between his junior and senior college seasons, Kay played for the Northside Wizards of the Queensland Basketball League (QBL). In nine games, he averaged 15.7 points, 7.6 rebounds and 2.8 assists per game.

Kay returned to the Wizards for the 2015 QBL season and averaged 22.2 points, 9.8 rebounds, 2.7 assists and 1.2 steals in 13 games.

=== Townsville Crocodiles (2015–2016) ===
In July 2015, Kay signed with the Townsville Crocodiles of the National Basketball League (NBL). He appeared in all 28 games for the Crocodiles in 2015–16 and ranked top-20 in the NBL for minutes played (28.11 per game). He averaged 10.7 points, 6.6 rebounds and 1.2 assists per game, while scoring in double figures on 16 occasions, recording three double-doubles and finishing as the league leader in offensive rebounding (3.0). He was subsequently named NBL Rookie of the Year.

=== Southland Sharks and Illawarra Hawks (2016–2018) ===
Following the NBL season, Kay joined the Southland Sharks for the 2016 New Zealand NBL season. In 19 games, he averaged 17.9 points, 8.7 rebounds, 2.8 assists and 1.3 steals per game.

In May 2016, Kay signed with the Illawarra Hawks. He helped the Hawks reach the grand final in the 2016–17 NBL season. In 34 games, he averaged 9.4 points, 4.5 rebounds, 2.1 assists and 1.0 steals per game.

Following the NBL season, Kay re-joined the Sharks for the 2017 New Zealand NBL season. In 20 games, he averaged 14.3 points, 9.2 rebounds, 3.8 assists and 1.2 steals per game.

With the Hawks in the 2017–18 NBL season, Kay averaged 11.7 points, 5.4 rebounds, 2.5 assists and 1.3 steals in 28 games.

=== Perth Wildcats and Wellington Saints (2018–2020) ===
On 20 April 2018, Kay signed a three-year deal with the Perth Wildcats. In the 2018–19 NBL season, he was named in the All-NBL First Team and helped the Wildcats win the championship. In 34 games, he averaged 14.7 points, 8.7 rebounds, 3.0 assists and 1.2 steals per game.

Following the NBL season, Kay joined the Wellington Saints for the 2019 New Zealand NBL season. He helped the Saints win the championship and earned league MVP honours. In 20 games, he averaged 15.9 points, 10.0 rebounds, 3.4 assists and 1.9 steals per game.

With the Wildcats in the 2019–20 NBL season, Kay was named to the All-NBL First Team for the second straight year and helped the team win back-to-back championships. In game three of the grand final series against the Sydney Kings, Kay had a career-best game with 30 points and seven 3-pointers to go with 12 rebounds and four assists in a 111–96 win. In 34 games, he averaged 15.8 points, 7.9 rebounds, 3.2 assists and 1.3 steals per game.

On 4 May 2020, Kay opted out of the final year of his contract with the Wildcats to pursue international opportunities after the NBL implemented salary cuts due to the COVID-19 pandemic.

=== Spain and Japan (2020–present) ===
On 5 July 2020, Kay signed with Real Betis of the Liga ACB. In 36 games in the 2020–21 ACB season, he averaged 7.9 points, 5.5 rebounds, 1.1 assists and 1.0 steals per game.

On 1 July 2021, Kay signed with Shimane Susanoo Magic of the Japanese B.League. In 56 games in the 2021–22 B.League season, he averaged 13.9 points, 7.8 rebounds, 3.5 assists and 1.4 steals per game.

On 22 June 2022, Kay re-signed with Shimane. In 63 games in the 2022–23 B.League season, he averaged 15.4 points, 7.7 rebounds and 3.3 assists per game.

Kay returned to Shimane for the 2023–24 B.League season and averaged 16.1 points, 8.9 rebounds, 3.4 assists and 1.4 steals in 60 games.

On 20 May 2024, Kay re-signed with Shimane. In 2024–25, he averaged 13 points, seven rebounds and 3.7 assists per game.

In May 2025, Kay re-signed with Shimane.

In May 2026, Kay re-signed with Shimane.

== National team career ==
Kay debuted for the Australian under 19 national team in 2010.

Kay was named to the Australian national team for the 2017 FIBA Asia Cup. In 2018, he won a gold medal with Australia at the Commonwealth Games. In 2019, he was awarded the Gaze Family Medal alongside Nathan Sobey for performances at the World Cup Qualifiers and the Commonwealth Games.

In February 2021, Kay was named in the Boomers' Olympic squad. He went on to help the Boomers win the bronze medal. He averaged 11.0 points and 6.3 rebounds in six games.

In February 2022, Kay was named in a 17-man Australian Boomers squad ahead of the FIBA World Cup Qualifiers in Japan. He re-joined the team for proceeding qualifying windows in August 2022 and February 2023.

In July 2024, Kay was named in the Boomers' final squad for the Paris Olympics.

In November 2024, Kay joined the Boomers for the 2025 FIBA Asia Cup qualifiers. He re-joined the squad in February 2025 for two more qualifiers.

In October 2025, Kay was named in the Boomers squad for the first window of the FIBA Basketball World Cup 2027 Asian Qualifiers. In February 2026, he was named in the squad for two more Asian qualifiers. In August 2026, he was named in the squad for another two Asian qualifiers.
