= Jason Cadee =

Australian basketball player (born 1991)

- Cadee in 2026

No. 5 – Bankstown Bruins
- Position: Point guard
- League: NBL1 East

Personal information
- Born: 15 April 1991 (age 35) Sydney, New South Wales, Australia
- Listed height: 183 cm (6 ft 0 in)
- Listed weight: 80 kg (176 lb)

Career information
- High school: Westfields Sports (Sydney, New South Wales)
- Playing career: 2008–present

Career history
- 2008: Bankstown Bruins
- 2009–2010: Australian Institute of Sport
- 2010–2012: Bankstown Bruins
- 2010–2012: Gold Coast Blaze
- 2012–2014: Adelaide 36ers
- 2013: West Adelaide Bearcats
- 2014: Super City Rangers
- 2014: Bankstown Bruins
- 2014–2018: Sydney Kings
- 2015: Super City Rangers
- 2016: Bankstown Bruins
- 2017: Kymis
- 2018–2023: Brisbane Bullets
- 2019–2020: Brisbane Capitals
- 2021–2024: Gold Coast Rollers
- 2023–2025: Adelaide 36ers
- 2025–present: Bankstown Bruins

Career highlights
- NBL Best Sixth Man (2020); QSL champion (2020); 2× QBL / NBL1 North champion (2019, 2022); NBL1 North Finals MVP (2022); 2× QBL / NBL1 North MVP (2019, 2023); 3× All-NBL1 North First Team (2021–2023); QBL All-League Team (2019); NZNBL All-Star Five (2014); NZNBL scoring champion (2014); Waratah League champion (2016); 3× Waratah League / NBL1 East All-Star Five (2010, 2016, 2025); Waratah League Australian U/21 Youth Player of the Year (2010)
Medals
Men's basketball
Representing Australia
Commonwealth Games
Gold medal – first place	2018 Gold Coast	Team competition
FIBA Asia Cup
Gold medal – first place	2017 Lebanon
Summer Universiade
Silver medal – second place	2013 Kazan	Team

Jason Robert Cadee (born 15 April 1991) is an Australian basketball player for the Bankstown Bruins of the NBL1 East. He debuted in the National Basketball League (NBL) in 2010 for the Gold Coast Blaze and went on to play for the Adelaide 36ers, Sydney Kings and Brisbane Bullets. He won the NBL Best Sixth Man Award in 2020. He retired from the NBL in 2025.

== Early life and career ==
Cadee was born and raised in the Sydney suburb of Greenacre. His mother, Debbie (née Lee), played for the Australian Opals at the 1984 Olympic Games in Los Angeles, and his father, Robbie, played for the Boomers at the 1976 Olympics in Montreal, and later coached the Opals at the 1988 Olympics in Seoul. As a six-year-old, Cadee was the towel boy for the West Sydney Razorbacks when his father was the team's CEO.

Cadee attended Westfields Sports High School in the suburb of Fairfield West, where he earned Hall of Fame status for basketball. He grew up playing for the Bankstown Bruins junior program.

In 2008, Cadee made his debut in the Waratah League for the Bruins. That same year, he was named the NSW Male Athlete and Basketball Player of the Year. In 2009 and 2010, he attended the Australian Institute of Sport (AIS) in Canberra where he played for the AIS men's team in the South East Australian Basketball League. He also played for Bankstown in 2010, earning the Waratah League's Australian U/21 Youth Player of the Year and All-Star Five honours.

In April 2010, Cadee participated in the Nike Hoop Summit in the U.S. for the World Select Team, where he recorded seven points, three rebounds and three assists in a 101–97 loss to the USA Junior Select Team.

In July 2010, just months after signing his first professional contract with the Gold Coast Blaze, Cadee was involved in a car accident on Sydney's M7 Motorway. A semi-trailer had veered out of its lane and pushed him off the road. His car went into a spin and parked itself at right angles across one of Sydney's busiest highways. In an instant, Cadee was crumpled against the middle console of the car. After being trapped for 90 minutes, he escaped with just a broken pelvis. As a result, his NBL debut was delayed and he was forced to withdraw from the Australian Boomers squad.

== Professional career ==
=== NBL ===
Five months after breaking his pelvis, Cadee made his NBL debut for the Gold Coast Blaze on 17 December 2010 against the Townsville Crocodiles. He scored 11 points in his debut, which was his highest scoring game of his rookie season. Cadee's second season in the NBL saw him play in all 31 games for the Blaze.

On 15 May 2012, Cadee signed a two-year deal with the Adelaide 36ers. In 2012–13, he played in all 28 games for the 36ers. In 2013–14, he helped the 36ers reach the NBL Grand Final, where they lost 2–1 to the Perth Wildcats.

In May 2014, Cadee signed with the Sydney Kings. He re-signed with the Kings in May 2015 and went on to score a career-high 32 points in February 2016 against the Townsville Crocodiles. He re-signed again in April 2016. He parted ways with the Kings following the 2017–18 NBL season.

On 19 April 2018, Cadee signed a three-year deal with the Brisbane Bullets. In February 2020, he was named the NBL Best Sixth Man for the 2019–20 season. On 2 July 2021, Cadee re-signed with the Bullets on a two-year deal. On 20 March 2022, he recorded the 1000th assist of his NBL career in a game against the Cairns Taipans. In November 2022, he played his 350th NBL game.

On 6 April 2023, Cadee signed a two-year deal with the Adelaide 36ers, returning to the franchise for a second stint. In October 2024, he played his 400th NBL game, becoming the 53rd NBL player and the 16th Adelaide 36er to reach the milestone.

On 11 February 2025, Cadee announced that he would be retiring from the NBL at the end of the 2024–25 season.

=== Off-season stints ===
In 2011 and 2012, Cadee played in the Waratah League for the Bankstown Bruins. In 2013, he played for the West Adelaide Bearcats of the Central ABL.

In 2014, Cadee moved to New Zealand to play for the Super City Rangers. He won the league's scoring title and earned All-Star Five honours. He returned to the Bruins following his stint with the Rangers. In 2015, he returned for a second season with the Rangers.

In 2016, Cadee helped the Bruins win the Waratah League championship.

In February 2017, following the conclusion of the 2016–17 NBL season, Cadee ventured to Europe to play for Greek team Kymis. In eight games to complete the 2016–17 Greek League season, he averaged 11.4 points, 2.1 rebounds, 2.3 assists and 1.5 steals per game.

In 2019, Cadee played for the Brisbane Capitals in the Queensland Basketball League (QBL) and earned league MVP and All-League Team honours. He also led them to the QBL championship. He returned to the Capitals in 2020 and helped them win the Queensland State League (QSL).

In February 2021, Cadee signed with the Gold Coast Rollers of the NBL1 North for the 2021 season. He re-signed with the Rollers in January 2022 for the 2022 season and went on to lead them to the NBL1 North championship while earning Finals MVP honours. He re-joined the Rollers for the 2023 season and earned NBL1 North MVP and Al-NBL1 North First Team honours. He re-joined the Rollers for the 2024 season.

In February 2025, Cadee signed with the Bankstown Bruins of the NBL1 East for the 2025 season. He was named in the NBL1 East All-Star Five. In October 2025, he re-signed with the Bruins for the 2026 season.

== National team career ==
In May 2008, Cadee was selected to the Australian Emus squad for the first time. He subsequently played for the Emus at the 2009 FIBA Under-19 World Championship, where in nine games, he averaged 9.1 points, 2.3 rebounds and 1.9 assists per name.

In 2012, Cadee played for Australia in the Stanković Cup. The team finished second and Cadee was named to the All-Star Five.

In 2013, Cadee played for Australia against China in a four-game series. He also played in the Stanković Cup and the World University Games, of which Australia won gold and silver respectively. Cadee then narrowly missed out on the Boomers squad for the 2013 FIBA Oceania Championship against New Zealand.

In 2017, Cadee helped the Boomers win gold at the FIBA Asia Cup.

== Personal life ==
Cadee and his partner Jasmine Hooper have three children.
