= 2016 New Zealand NBL season =

- League: New Zealand NBL
- Sport: Basketball
- Duration: 10 March – 4 June
- Games: 18
- Teams: 7

Regular season
- Minor premiers: Canterbury Rams
- Season MVP: McKenzie Moore (Canterbury Rams)
- Top scorer: Eric Devendorf (Super City Rangers)

Final Four
- Champions: Wellington Saints
- Runners-up: Super City Rangers
- Finals MVP: Tai Wesley

New Zealand NBL seasons
- ← 2015 2017 →

The 2016 NBL season was the 35th season of the National Basketball League. The league's team total dropped to an all-time low for the 2016 season, with the departure of the Manawatu Jets leaving the competition with seven teams.

The 2016 pre-season tournament was held at the Te Rauparaha Arena in Porirua from Friday 26 February through Sunday 28 February. The four-team event featured the Canterbury Rams (2–1), Nelson Giants (3–0), Wellington Saints (0–3) and a Porirua invitational team (1–2). The regular season commenced on Thursday 10 March in Wellington with the Wellington Saints hosting the Super City Rangers at TSB Bank Arena. The season contained 12 weeks of regular season games and a Final Four series on Queens' Birthday weekend in June. As the only team based north of Hawke's Bay, the Rangers utilised two new 'home' venues around the Upper North Island, Te Awamutu and Whangārei, providing increased exposure for elite basketball in that area of the country.

The regular season concluded with the Rams earning a playoff berth for the first time since 2002 and their first minor premiership since 1993, while the Hawks recorded their first winless season in franchise history and joined the 1998 Northland Suns, 2009 Taranaki Mountainairs, 2010 Otago Nuggets and 2015 Taranaki Mountainairs as the only sides in NBL history to go an entire season without a win.

For the first time in the competition's history, Invercargill hosted the Final Four weekend, with the semifinals on Friday 3 June, followed by the championship game on Saturday 4 June.

== Team information ==
Team	City	Arena	Colours	Head coach	Import	Import
Canterbury Rams	Christchurch	Cowles Stadium		(New Zealand) Mark Dickel	(United States) Justin Graham	(United States) McKenzie Moore
Hawke's Bay Hawks	Napier	Pettigrew Green Arena		(New Zealand) Kirstin Daly-Taylor	(United States) Kareem Johnson	(United States) Chris Porter
Nelson Giants	Nelson	Trafalgar Centre		(United States) Tim Fanning	(United States) Raymond Cowels	(United States) Ben Strong
Southland Sharks	Invercargill	Stadium Southland		(New Zealand) Judd Flavell	(Australia) Nick Kay	(Australia) Mitch Norton
Super City Rangers	Auckland	AUT North Shore		(New Zealand) Jeff Green	(United States) Eric Devendorf	(United States) Terrence Roberts
Taranaki Mountainairs	New Plymouth	TSB Stadium		(New Zealand) Ross McMains	(United States) Marcus Johnson	(United States) Daniel Miller
Wellington Saints	Wellington	TSB Bank Arena		(United States) Kevin Braswell	(United States) Torrey Craig	(United States) Bryan Davis

== Summary ==
=== Regular season standings ===
Pos
Pos	Team	W	L
1	Canterbury Rams	13	5
2	Wellington Saints	13	5
3	Southland Sharks	11	7
4	Super City Rangers	9	9
5	Nelson Giants	9	9
6	Taranaki Mountainairs	8	10
7	Hawke's Bay Hawks	0	18

=== Final Four ===
Semi-finals
1	Canterbury Rams	85
4	Super City Rangers	104
2	Wellington Saints	79
3	Southland Sharks	75

Final
Super City Rangers	82
Wellington Saints	94

== Awards ==
=== Player of the Week ===
Round	Player	Team	Ref
1	Torrey Craig	Wellington Saints	
1	Leon Henry	Wellington Saints	
1	Ben Strong	Nelson Giants	
2	Finn Delany	Nelson Giants	
3	Jordair Jett	Southland Sharks	
4	Jordair Jett	Southland Sharks	
5	McKenzie Moore	Canterbury Rams	
6	Torrey Craig	Wellington Saints	
6	Terrence Roberts	Super City Rangers	
7	Marcel Jones	Canterbury Rams	
8	Raymond Cowels	Nelson Giants	
9	Marcel Jones	Canterbury Rams	
10	Nick Kay	Southland Sharks	
11	Ben Strong	Nelson Giants	
12	Dion Prewster	Wellington Saints	

=== Statistics leaders ===
Stats as of the end of the regular season

Category	Player	Team	Stat
Points per game	Eric Devendorf	Super City Rangers	25.8
Rebounds per game	Alex Pledger	Southland Sharks	11.4
Assists per game	McKenzie Moore	Canterbury Rams	8.2
Steals per game	McKenzie Moore	Canterbury Rams	3.4
Blocks per game	Daniel Miller	Taranaki Mountainairs	1.9

=== Regular season ===
- Most Valuable Player: McKenzie Moore (Canterbury Rams)
- NZ Most Valuable Player: Marcel Jones (Canterbury Rams)
- Most Outstanding Guard: McKenzie Moore (Canterbury Rams)
- Most Outstanding NZ Guard: Shea Ili (Wellington Saints)
- Most Outstanding Forward: Marcel Jones (Canterbury Rams)
- Most Outstanding NZ Forward/Centre: Marcel Jones (Canterbury Rams)
- Scoring Champion: Eric Devendorf (Super City Rangers)
- Rebounding Champion: Alex Pledger (Southland Sharks)
- Assist Champion: McKenzie Moore (Canterbury Rams)
- Rookie of the Year: Logan Elers (Taranaki Mountainairs)
- Coach of the Year: Ross McMains (Taranaki Mountainairs)
- All-Star Five:
  - G: McKenzie Moore (Canterbury Rams)
  - G: Raymond Cowels (Nelson Giants)
  - F: Torrey Craig (Wellington Saints)
  - F: Marcel Jones (Canterbury Rams)
  - C: Alex Pledger (Southland Sharks)

=== Final Four ===
- Finals MVP: Tai Wesley (Wellington Saints)
