= David Cooper (basketball) =

Australian basketball player

Personal information
- Born: 15 October 1976 (age 50) Toowoomba, Queensland
- Listed height: 206 cm (6 ft 9 in)
- Listed weight: 95 kg (209 lb)

Career information
- High school: Gympie State (Gympie, Queensland)
- Playing career: 2000–2011
- Position: Centre / power forward
- Coaching career: 2012–present

Career history

Playing
- 2000–2002: Brisbane Bullets
- 2002: Dandenong Rangers
- 2002–2003: Victoria Giants
- 2003–2005: Manawatu Jets
- 2003–2004: Cairns Taipans
- 2004–2010: Adelaide 36ers
- 2006–2011: Norwood Flames
- 2009: Hawke's Bay Hawks

Coaching
- 2012: Norwood Flames (asst.)
- 2013–2016: Norwood Flames

Career highlights
- As player: NZNBL MVP (2003); NZNBL Most Outstanding Forward (2003); NZNBL All-Star Five (2003); 2× NZNBL rebounding champion (2004, 2005); 2× Central ABL champion (2008, 2009); 2× Central ABL Best Defensive Player (2006, 2007); 2× Central ABL All-Star Five (2006, 2007); As coach: Central ABL Coach of the Year (2014)

David Jones Cooper (born 15 October 1976) is an Australian former professional basketball player who played the majority of his career in the Australian National Basketball League (ANBL). He also played in the New Zealand NBL and the South Australian State League.

== Playing career ==
Born in Toowoomba, Queensland, Cooper began his ANBL career in 2000 with the Brisbane Bullets. After two seasons playing for the Bullets, he joined the Victoria Giants for the 2002–03 NBL season. Following the 2002–03 season, Cooper moved to New Zealand where he joined the Manawatu Jets for the 2003 New Zealand NBL season. He went on to earn league MVP honours that year, while also garnering Most Outstanding Forward and All-Star Five honours.

For the 2003–04 NBL season, Cooper joined the Cairns Taipans. In 35 games for the Taipans, he averaged 5.5 points, 4.1 rebounds and 1.0 blocks per game. He re-joined the Manawatu Jets for the 2004 New Zealand NBL season and won the Garry Pettis Memorial Trophy for leading the league in rebounding.

For the 2004–05 NBL season, Cooper joined the Adelaide 36ers, the team he continued to play for until 2010 when he retired from the league following the 2009–10 NBL season. In 293 ANBL games over 10 seasons, he averaged 5.2 points, 4.9 rebounds, 1.0 assists and 1.1 blocks per game.

Cooper also played two more years in the New Zealand NBL (2005 with Manawatu, and 2009 with the Hawke's Bay Hawks), and spent six years playing in the South Australian State League for the Norwood Flames between 2006 and 2011.

== Coaching career ==
In 2012, Cooper became an assistant coach for the Norwood Flames. He became head coach the following year, winning Central ABL Coach of the Year honours in 2014.
