= 2004 New Zealand NBL season =

- League: New Zealand NBL
- Sport: Basketball
- Duration: 12 March – 27 June
- Games: 18
- Teams: 10

Regular season
- Minor premiers: Wellington Saints
- Season MVP: Adrian Majstrovich (Hawke's Bay Hawks)
- Top scorer: Geordie Cullen (Waikato Titans)

Playoffs
- Champions: Auckland Stars
- Runners-up: Nelson Giants
- Final MVP: Aaron Olson

New Zealand NBL seasons
- ← 2003 2005 →

The 2004 NBL season was the 23rd season of the National Basketball League. The Auckland Stars won the championship in 2004 to claim their eighth league title.

== Summary ==
=== Regular season standings ===
Pos
Pos	Team	W	L
1	Wellington Saints	13	5
2	Hawke's Bay Hawks	13	5
3	Nelson Giants	12	6
4	Auckland Stars	11	7
5	Manawatu Jets	10	8
6	Waikato Titans	10	8
7	Canterbury Rams	7	11
8	Taranaki Mountainairs	7	11
9	Otago Nuggets	4	14
10	Harbour Heat	3	15

=== Playoff bracket ===
Semi-finals
1	Wellington Saints	65
4	Auckland Stars	83
2	Hawke's Bay Hawks	51
3	Nelson Giants	69

Final
Auckland Stars	80
Nelson Giants	68

== Awards ==
=== Player of the Week ===
Round	Player	Team	Ref
1	David Cooper	Manawatu Jets	
2	Phill Jones	Nelson Giants	
3	Clifton Bush	Canterbury Rams	
4	Phill Jones	Nelson Giants	
5	Dillon Boucher	Waikato Titans	
6	Casey Frank	Auckland Stars	
7	Geordie Cullen	Waikato Titans	
8	Phill Jones	Nelson Giants	
9	Geordie Cullen	Waikato Titans	
10	David Cooper	Manawatu Jets	
11	Ben Knight	Wellington Saints	
12	Clifton Bush	Canterbury Rams	
13	Willie Banks	Taranaki Mountainairs	
14	Ben Knight	Wellington Saints	
SF	Darnell McCulloch	Nelson Giants	
SF	Lindsay Tait	Auckland Stars	

=== Statistics leaders ===
Stats as of the end of the regular season

Category	Player	Team	Stat
Points per game	Geordie Cullen	Waikato Titans	23.7
Rebounds per game	David Cooper	Manawatu Jets	11.7
Assists per game	Paul Henare	Hawke's Bay Hawks	5.2
Steals per game	Dillon Boucher	Auckland Stars	4.1
Blocks per game	Kenny Walker	Canterbury Rams	2.0

=== Regular season ===
- Most Valuable Player: Adrian Majstrovich (Hawke's Bay Hawks)
- NZ Most Valuable Player: Adrian Majstrovich (Hawke's Bay Hawks)
- Most Outstanding Guard: Lindsay Tait (Auckland Stars)
- Most Outstanding NZ Guard: Lindsay Tait (Auckland Stars)
- Most Outstanding Forward: Adrian Majstrovich (Hawke's Bay Hawks)
- Most Outstanding NZ Forward/Centre: Adrian Majstrovich (Hawke's Bay Hawks)
- Scoring Champion: Geordie Cullen (Waikato Titans)
- Rebounding Champion: David Cooper (Manawatu Jets)
- Assist Champion: Paul Henare (Hawke's Bay Hawks)
- Rookie of the Year: Luke Martin (Manawatu Jets)
- Coach of the Year: Shawn Dennis (Hawke's Bay Hawks)
- All-Star Five:
  - G: Willie Banks (Taranaki Mountainairs)
  - G: Lindsay Tait (Auckland Stars)
  - F: Adrian Majstrovich (Hawke's Bay Hawks)
  - F: Ben Knight (Wellington Saints)
  - C: Geordie Cullen (Waikato Titans)

=== Playoffs ===
- Final MVP: Aaron Olson (Auckland Stars)
