= 2003 New Zealand NBL season =

- League: New Zealand NBL
- Sport: Basketball
- Duration: 23 April – 16 August
- Games: 18
- Teams: 10

Regular season
- Minor premiers: Waikato Titans
- Season MVP: David Cooper (Manawatu Jets)
- Top scorer: John Whorton (Canterbury Rams)

Playoffs
- Champions: Wellington Saints
- Runners-up: Waikato Titans

New Zealand NBL seasons
- ← 2002 2004 →

The 2003 NBL season was the 22nd season of the National Basketball League. 2003 marked the first year a league-wide MVP award winner was named, allowing imports the opportunity to be recognised; in all previous seasons, only a Kiwi MVP was named, an award given to the best New Zealand player. Australian import David Cooper of the Manawatu Jets was subsequently awarded the first league MVP. 2003 also marked the return of Taranaki after a three-year hiatus. The Wellington Saints won the championship over the Waikato Titans in overtime, as the Saints claimed their fifth league title.

== Summary ==
=== Regular season standings ===
Pos
Pos	Team	W	L
1	Waikato Titans	16	2
2	Wellington Saints	12	6
3	Manawatu Jets	12	6
4	Auckland Stars	12	6
5	Nelson Giants	11	7
6	Hawke's Bay Hawks	8	10
7	Otago Nuggets	7	11
8	Taranaki Mountainairs	5	13
9	Canterbury Rams	4	14
10	Harbour Heat	3	15

=== Playoff bracket ===
Semi-finals
1	Waikato Titans	98
4	Auckland Stars	77
2	Wellington Saints	89
3	Manawatu Jets	70

Final
Waikato Titans	88
Wellington Saints	97

== Awards ==
=== Player of the Week ===
Round	Player	Team	Ref
1	Issiah Epps	Otago Nuggets	
2	Dillon Boucher	Waikato Titans	
2	Mike Pegues	Canterbury Rams	
3	Issiah Epps	Otago Nuggets	
4	Dillon Boucher	Waikato Titans	
5	Ed Book	Nelson Giants	
5	Dillon Boucher	Waikato Titans	
6	Lindsay Tait	Auckland Stars	
7	John Whorton	Canterbury Rams	
8	John Whorton	Canterbury Rams	
9	David Cooper	Manawatu Jets	
10	Paul Henare	Hawke's Bay Hawks	
11	Casey Frank	Auckland Stars	
12	Willie Banks	Taranaki Mountainairs	
13	John Whorton	Canterbury Rams	
14	Mark Dickel	Otago Nuggets	
15	Michael Tompson	Wellington Saints	
SF	Iona Enosa	Waikato Titans	
F	Ben Knight	Wellington Saints	

=== Statistics leaders ===
Stats as of the end of the regular season

Category	Player	Team	Stat
Points per game	John Whorton	Canterbury Rams	29.3
Rebounds per game	John Whorton	Canterbury Rams	16.5
Assists per game	George Le'afa	Wellington Saints	6.2
Steals per game	Dillon Boucher	Waikato Titans	4.5
Blocks per game	David Cooper	Manawatu Jets	2.8

=== Regular season ===
- Most Valuable Player: David Cooper (Manawatu Jets)
- NZ Most Valuable Player: Dillon Boucher (Waikato Titans)
- Most Outstanding Guard: Lindsay Tait (Auckland Stars)
- Most Outstanding NZ Guard: Lindsay Tait (Auckland Stars)
- Most Outstanding Forward: David Cooper (Manawatu Jets)
- Most Outstanding NZ Forward/Centre: Dillon Boucher (Waikato Titans)
- Scoring Champion: John Whorton (Canterbury Rams)
- Rebounding Champion: John Whorton (Canterbury Rams)
- Assist Champion: George Le'afa (Wellington Saints)
- Rookie of the Year: Adrian Majstrovich (Hawke's Bay Hawks)
- Coach of the Year: Mike McHugh (Wellington Saints)
- All-Star Five:
  - G: Paul Henare (Hawke's Bay Hawks)
  - G: Lindsay Tait (Auckland Stars)
  - F: Dillon Boucher (Waikato Titans)
  - F: Link Abrams (Taranaki Mountainairs)
  - C: David Cooper (Manawatu Jets)
