= Lindsay Tait =

New Zealand basketball player

Manawatu Jets
- Title: Head coach
- League: NZNBL

Personal information
- Born: 8 January 1982 (age 44) Sydney, New South Wales, Australia
- Listed height: 190 cm (6 ft 3 in)
- Listed weight: 91 kg (201 lb)

Career information
- High school: Avondale College (Auckland, New Zealand)
- Playing career: 2000–2018
- Position: Point guard / shooting guard
- Coaching career: 2020–present

Career history

Playing
- 2000–2007: Auckland Rebels/Stars
- 2002–2003: Victoria Giants
- 2003–2006: New Zealand Breakers
- 2006–2007: BC Boncourt
- 2007–2009: Wollongong Hawks
- 2008–2011: Wellington Saints
- 2010–2011: Cairns Taipans
- 2012: Auckland Pirates
- 2013–2015: Wellington Saints
- 2016–2018: Super City Rangers

Coaching
- 2020: Auckland Huskies (assistant)
- 2027–: Manawatu Jets

Career highlights
- 7× NZNBL champion (2000, 2004, 2005, 2010–2012, 2014); 3× NZNBL Most Valuable Player (2005, 2010, 2013); 3× NZNBL Kiwi MVP (2005, 2013, 2015); 3× NZNBL Finals MVP (2010, 2011, 2014); 9× NZNBL All-Star Five (2003–2007, 2010–2013); 7× NZNBL Most Outstanding Guard (2003–2005, 2010–2013); 9× NZNBL Most Outstanding Kiwi Guard (2003–2005, 2007, 2010–2013, 2015); 4× NZNBL assist champion (2010, 2013, 2015, 2018)
Medals
Men's basketball
Representing New Zealand
Commonwealth Games
| Silver medal – second place | 2006 Melbourne | Team competition |

Lindsay Michael Tait (born 8 January 1982) is a New Zealand basketball coach and former player who currently serves as head coach of the Manawatu Jets of the New Zealand National Basketball League (NZNBL).

== Early life ==
Tait was born in Sydney, New South Wales. He lived in Australia until he was four years old, when he and his family moved to New Zealand. He is Māori. He attended Avondale College in Auckland, where he won a schools championship with the basketball team.

== Professional career ==
In 2000, Tait joined the Auckland Stars of the New Zealand National Basketball League (NZNBL), where he went on to play eight seasons for the club, winning three championships (2000, 2004 and 2005) and earned league MVP in 2005. During this time, he also played in the Australian National Basketball League (NBL) for the Victoria Giants in 2002–03 as a development player, and the New Zealand Breakers from 2003 to 2006. He also played in Switzerland for BC Boncourt in 2006–07.

After an injury-riddled season for the Wollongong Hawks in 2007–08, Tait returned to New Zealand where he played for the Wellington Saints during the 2008 New Zealand NBL season before re-joining Wollongong for the 2008–09 NBL season. He went on to play a further three seasons for Wellington and won back-to-back championships (2010 and 2011) for the second time in his career. He also earned back-to-back Finals MVP honours in 2010 and 2011.

In December 2010, Tait signed with the Cairns Taipans for the rest of the 2010–11 NBL season.

In November 2011, Tait signed with the Auckland Pirates for the 2012 New Zealand NBL season, going on to captain the team to the 2012 NZNBL championship, as he captured his own personal championship three-peat in the process.

In December 2012, following the Pirates pulling out of the league, Tait signed a three-year deal with the Wellington Saints, returning to the club for a second stint. He went on to win the 2013 Most Valuable Player award, his third time doing so. In 2014, Tait led the Saints to an eighth NZNBL championship as he recorded his seventh title and was named the Final Four MVP.

On 9 April 2015, Tait was named Round 1 Player of the Week after he opened the 2015 season with a double-double of 22 points and 10 assists in a road win over the Taranaki Mountainairs on 2 April, then backed it up four days later with 22 points in a home win over the Canterbury Rams. He went on to lead the Saints back to the grand final, where they were defeated by the Southland Sharks.

On 5 November 2015, Tait signed a three-year deal with the Super City Rangers. On 26 March 2016, he recorded 19 points and 15 assists against the Canterbury Rams, setting a Rangers franchise record for assists in a game.

On 11 May 2018, Tait announced that the 2018 season would be his last in the NZNBL. The following day, he recorded a triple-double with 20 points, 10 rebounds and 14 assists in the Rangers' 124–121 loss to the Manawatu Jets. On 7 June 2018, Tait became just the ninth player to reach 300 NZNBL games.

== National team career ==
Tait made his debut for the New Zealand Tall Blacks in 2003. He played for the Tall Blacks at the 2005 FIBA Oceania Championship, 2007 FIBA Oceania Championship, 2008 FIBA Olympic Qualifying Tournament, 2009 FIBA Oceania Championship, 2010 FIBA World Championship, 2011 FIBA Oceania Championship, 2012 FIBA Olympic Qualifying Tournament, 2014 FIBA Basketball World Cup and 2015 FIBA Oceania Championship. He won a silver medal with New Zealand at the 2006 Commonwealth Games.

In May 2016, Tait announced his retirement from international basketball.

== Coaching career ==
In June 2020, Tait was named an assistant coach for the Auckland Huskies ahead of the 2020 NBL Showdown.

In November 2026, Tait was appointed head coach of the Manawatu Jets for the 2027 New Zealand NBL season.

== Personal life ==
Tait holds an English passport.

As of April 2025, Tait was working at Auckland Grammar School and running his own club, the Central Auckland Silverbacks.
