= 2018 New Zealand NBL season =

- League: New Zealand NBL
- Sport: Basketball
- Duration: 26 April – 5 August
- Games: 18
- Teams: 8

Regular season
- Minor premiers: Wellington Saints
- Season MVP: Shea Ili (Wellington Saints)
- Top scorer: Daishon Knight (Manawatu Jets)

Final Four
- Champions: Southland Sharks
- Runners-up: Wellington Saints
- Finals MVP: Reuben Te Rangi

New Zealand NBL seasons
- ← 2017 2019 →

The 2018 NBL season was the 37th season of the National Basketball League. In 2018, the league welcomed back the Manawatu Jets after a two-season hiatus.

The regular season commenced on Thursday 26 April in Napier with the Hawke's Bay Hawks hosting the Southland Sharks at Pettigrew Green Arena. The season contained 14 weeks of regular season games followed by a Final Four weekend in August. The competition included a one-week international break, from 25 June to 1 July, and started later than normal due to the Gold Coast Commonwealth Games.

== Team information ==
Team	City	Arena	Colours	Head coach	Import	Import	Import
Canterbury Rams	Christchurch	Cowles Stadium		(New Zealand) Mark Dickel	(United States) Winston Shepard	(United States) Xavier Thames	(United States) Julian Washburn
Hawke's Bay Hawks	Napier	Pettigrew Green Arena		(New Zealand) Zico Coronel	(Australia) Angus Brandt	(United States) Jamie Skeen	
Manawatu Jets	Palmerston North	Arena Manawatu		(New Zealand) Tim McTamney	(United States) Kuran Iverson	(United States) Daishon Knight	(United States) Brandon Lucas
Nelson Giants	Nelson	Trafalgar Centre		(Australia) Jamie Pearlman	(Australia) Kyle Adnam	(United States) Jerry Evans Jr.	(Australia) Damon Heuir
Southland Sharks	Invercargill	Stadium Southland		(New Zealand) Judd Flavell	(United States) Orlando Coleman	(Canada) Conor Morgan	(Australia) Jarrad Weeks
Super City Rangers	Auckland	The Trusts Arena		(New Zealand) Jeff Green	(United States) Okesene Ale	(United States) Clayton Wilson	
Taranaki Mountainairs	New Plymouth	TSB Stadium		(New Zealand) Trent Adam	(United States) Javonte Douglas	(United States) Xavier Smith	(United States) Roger Woods
Wellington Saints	Wellington	TSB Bank Arena		(United States) Kevin Braswell	(Australia) Shaun Bruce	(South Sudan) Majok Majok	(United States) L. J. Peak

== Summary ==
=== Regular season standings ===
Pos	Team	W	L	Qualification
1	Wellington Saints	15	3	Final Four
2	Nelson Giants	14	4	Final Four
3	Southland Sharks	13	5	Final Four
4	Hawke's Bay Hawks	12	6	Final Four
5	Canterbury Rams	8	10	
6	Super City Rangers	4	14	
7	Taranaki Mountainairs	3	15	
8	Manawatu Jets	3	15	

Source: New Zealand National Basketball League

=== Final Four ===
Semi-finals
1	Wellington Saints	99
4	Hawke's Bay Hawks	73
2	Nelson Giants	93
3	Southland Sharks	98

Final
Wellington Saints	96
Southland Sharks	98

== Awards ==
=== Player of the Week ===
Round	Player	Team	Ref
1	Javonte Douglas	Taranaki Mountainairs	
2	Kyle Adnam	Nelson Giants	
3	Kuran Iverson	Manawatu Jets	
4	Winston Shepard	Canterbury Rams	
5	Shea Ili	Wellington Saints	
6	Ethan Rusbatch	Hawke's Bay Hawks	
7	Shea Ili	Wellington Saints	
8	Julian Washburn	Canterbury Rams	
9	Lindsay Tait	Super City Rangers	
10			
11	Finn Delany	Nelson Giants	
12	Daishon Knight	Manawatu Jets	
13	Orlando Coleman	Southland Sharks	
14	Dominique Kelman-Poto	Super City Rangers	

=== Statistics leaders ===
Stats as of the end of the regular season

Category	Player	Team	Stat
Points per game	Daishon Knight	Manawatu Jets	28.9
Rebounds per game	Kuran Iverson	Manawatu Jets	11.1
Assists per game	Lindsay Tait	Super City Rangers	7.6
Steals per game	Winston Shepard	Canterbury Rams	2.3
Blocks per game	Xavier Smith	Taranaki Mountainairs	1.7

=== Regular season ===
- Most Valuable Player: Shea Ili (Wellington Saints)
- NZ Most Valuable Player: Shea Ili (Wellington Saints)
- Most Outstanding Guard: Shea Ili (Wellington Saints)
- Most Outstanding NZ Guard: Shea Ili (Wellington Saints)
- Most Outstanding Forward: Finn Delany (Nelson Giants)
- Most Outstanding NZ Forward/Centre: Finn Delany (Nelson Giants)
- Scoring Champion: Daishon Knight (Manawatu Jets)
- Rebounding Champion: Kuran Iverson (Manawatu Jets)
- Assist Champion: Lindsay Tait (Super City Rangers)
- Rookie of the Year: Max Darling (Canterbury Rams)
- Coach of the Year: Jamie Pearlman (Nelson Giants)
- All-Star Five:
  - G: Shea Ili (Wellington Saints)
  - G: Jarrad Weeks (Southland Sharks)
  - F: Winston Shepard (Canterbury Rams)
  - F: Finn Delany (Nelson Giants)
  - C: Angus Brandt (Hawke's Bay Hawks)

=== Final Four ===
- Finals MVP: Reuben Te Rangi (Southland Sharks)
