= 2014 New Zealand NBL season =

- League: New Zealand NBL
- Sport: Basketball
- Duration: 2 April – 5 July
- Games: 18
- Teams: 10

Regular season
- Minor premiers: Hawke's Bay Hawks
- Season MVP: Corey Webster (Wellington Saints)
- Top scorer: Jason Cadee (Super City Rangers)

Final Four
- Champions: Wellington Saints
- Runners-up: Hawke's Bay Hawks
- Final Four MVP: Lindsay Tait

New Zealand NBL seasons
- ← 2013 2015 →

The 2014 NBL season was the 33rd season of the National Basketball League. The Canterbury Rams returned to the league in 2014 after a five-year hiatus.

The 2014 pre-season tournament was held at the Te Rauparaha Arena in Porirua on Saturday 22 March and Sunday 23 March. The Manawatu Jets were the only team to go undefeated over the two days, finishing with a 4–0 record.

In 2014, the NBL Final Four made a triumphant return to Wellington. The Final Four weekend was held at TSB Bank Arena, with the semifinals on Friday 4 July, followed by the championship game on Saturday 5 July.

== Team information ==
Team	City	Arena	Head coach	Import	Import
Canterbury Rams	Christchurch	Cowles Stadium	(New Zealand) Dave Harrison	(United States) Glen Dandridge	(United States) Matthew Rogers
Hawke's Bay Hawks	Napier	Pettigrew Green Arena	(New Zealand) Tab Baldwin	(United States) Kareem Johnson	(United States) Dustin Scott
Manawatu Jets	Palmerston North	Arena Manawatu	(New Zealand) Darron Larsen	(United States) Brandon Jenkins	(United States) Paul Jones
Nelson Giants	Nelson	Saxton Stadium	(Australia) Liam Flynn	(United States) Jamal Boykin	(United States) Josh Pace
Otago Nuggets	Dunedin	Edgar Centre	(New Zealand) Mark Dickel	(United States) Brandon Bowdry	(United States) Warren Carter
Southland Sharks	Invercargill	Stadium Southland	(New Zealand) Paul Henare	(United States) Kevin Braswell	(United States) Brian Conklin
Super City Rangers	Auckland	The Trusts Arena	(New Zealand) Aik Ho	(Australia) Jason Cadee	(Australia) Daryl Corletto
Taranaki Mountainairs	New Plymouth	TSB Stadium	(New Zealand) Daryn Shaw	(Nigeria) Suleiman Braimoh	
Waikato Pistons	Hamilton	Hamilton Boys' High School	(New Zealand) Pero Cameron	(United States) Corin Henry	(United States) Akeem Wright
Wellington Saints	Wellington	TSB Bank Arena	(Australia) Shane Heal	(United States) Brandon Bowman	(United States) Bryan Davis

== Summary ==
=== Regular season standings ===
Pos
Pos	Team	W	L
1	Hawke's Bay Hawks	15	3
2	Wellington Saints	12	6
3	Nelson Giants	11	7
4	Southland Sharks	10	8
5	Manawatu Jets	9	9
6	Waikato Pistons	8	10
7	Super City Rangers	7	11
8	Otago Nuggets	7	11
9	Canterbury Rams	6	12
10	Taranaki Mountainairs	5	13

=== Final Four ===
Semi-finals
1	Hawke's Bay Hawks	100
4	Southland Sharks	87
2	Wellington Saints	89
3	Nelson Giants	71

Final
Hawke's Bay Hawks	69
Wellington Saints	85

== Awards ==
=== Player of the Week ===
Round	Player	Team	Ref
1	Paul Jones	Manawatu Jets	
2	Kevin Braswell	Southland Sharks	
3	Dustin Scott	Hawke's Bay Hawks	
4	Suleiman Braimoh	Taranaki Mountainairs	
5	Suleiman Braimoh	Taranaki Mountainairs	
6	Suleiman Braimoh	Taranaki Mountainairs	
7	Suleiman Braimoh	Taranaki Mountainairs	
8	Jamal Boykin	Nelson Giants	
9	Kevin Braswell	Southland Sharks	
10	Brandon Bowdry	Otago Nuggets	
11	Josh Pace	Nelson Giants	
12	Corey Webster	Wellington Saints	
13	Nick Horvath	Manawatu Jets	

=== Rookie of the Week ===
Round	Player	Team	Ref
1	Tai Wynyard	Super City Rangers	
2	Alex Talma	Waikato Pistons	
3	Richie Edwards	Canterbury Rams	
4	Richie Edwards	Canterbury Rams	
4	Derone Raukawa	Manawatu Jets	
5	Richie Edwards	Canterbury Rams	
6	Finn Delany	Nelson Giants	
7	Finn Delany	Nelson Giants	
8	Tohi Smith-Milner	Super City Rangers	
9	Dyson King-Hawea	Waikato Pistons	
10	Zac Carter	Waikato Pistons	
11	Tohi Smith-Milner	Super City Rangers	
12	Micah Lepaio	Otago Nuggets	
13	Tony Tolovae	Otago Nuggets	

=== Statistics leaders ===
Stats as of the end of the regular season

Category	Player	Team	Stat
Points per game	Jason Cadee	Super City Rangers	26.7
Rebounds per game	Nick Horvath	Manawatu Jets	15.9
Assists per game	Mark Dickel	Otago Nuggets	9.1
Steals per game	Jeremy Kench	Canterbury Rams	2.2
Blocks per game	Matthew Rogers	Canterbury Rams	2.6

=== Regular season ===
- Most Valuable Player: Corey Webster (Wellington Saints)
- NZ Most Valuable Player: Corey Webster (Wellington Saints)
- Most Outstanding Guard: Corey Webster (Wellington Saints)
- Most Outstanding NZ Guard: Corey Webster (Wellington Saints)
- Most Outstanding Forward: Suleiman Braimoh (Taranaki Mountainairs)
- Most Outstanding NZ Forward/Centre: Duane Bailey (Super City Rangers)
- Scoring Champion: Jason Cadee (Super City Rangers)
- Rebounding Champion: Nick Horvath (Manawatu Jets)
- Assist Champion: Mark Dickel (Otago Nuggets)
- Rookie of the Year: Richie Edwards (Canterbury Rams)
- Coach of the Year: Tab Baldwin (Hawke's Bay Hawks)
- All-Star Five:
  - G: Jason Cadee (Super City Rangers)
  - G: Corey Webster (Wellington Saints)
  - F: Dustin Scott (Hawke's Bay Hawks)
  - F: Suleiman Braimoh (Taranaki Mountainairs)
  - C: Jamal Boykin (Nelson Giants)

=== Final Four ===
- Final Four MVP: Lindsay Tait (Wellington Saints)
