= Super City Rangers =

- League: National Basketball League
- Founded: 1990
- Folded: August 2019
- History: Waitakere Rangers; 1990–1995; Super City Rangers; 2013–2019
- Location: Auckland, New Zealand
- Team colours: Black, green, blue
- Championships: 0
Home	Away

The Super City Rangers were a New Zealand basketball team based in Auckland. The Rangers competed in the National Basketball League (NBL) and played their home games across multiple venues in Auckland.

== Team history ==
The Waitakere Rangers debuted in the National Basketball League (NBL) in 1990 but withdrew following the 1995 season. Waitakere Basketball continued to hold a valid NBL licence as of 2004 but were never able to reactivate it. After joining the Conference Basketball League (CBL), the Rangers won the CBL title in 1996 and finished runners-up in 2006.

In 2013, the Rangers reemerged as a consolidated Auckland franchise and returned to the NBL after an 18-year absence. As the Super City Rangers, the team reached the NBL final in 2016, where they lost 94–82 to the Wellington Saints.

In August 2019, the Rangers franchise was terminated by the NBL due to multiple breaches of their participation agreement, including having outstanding debts and fees owed to the league. A review of the franchise had started prior to the conclusion of the 2019 season, citing missed deadlines for league payments and late payments to players as concerning issues that raised red flags.
