= List of current New Zealand NBL team rosters =

Below is a list of current New Zealand NBL team rosters:

== Current team roster ==
=== Auckland Tuatara ===
Note: Flags indicate national team eligibility at FIBA-sanctioned events. Players may hold other non-FIBA nationalities not displayed.

Auckland Tuatara roster
Players
Coaches

Pos.	No.	Nat.	Name	Ht.
G	0	(United States)	Pride, Charles (I)	1.93 m (6 ft 4 in)
G	2	(New Zealand)	Wylie, Joshua	1.82 m (6 ft 0 in)
G	3	(New Zealand)	McIntosh, Chris	1.84 m (6 ft 0 in)
G/F	5	(Ethiopia)	Tuach, Buay (I)	1.98 m (6 ft 6 in)
G	7	(New Zealand)	Ioane, Krisnan-Cole	1.93 m (6 ft 4 in)
G	8	(United States)	Muhammad, Luther (I)	1.91 m (6 ft 3 in)
G	9	(New Zealand)	Wilkie, Dylan	1.91 m (6 ft 3 in)
G	10	(New Zealand)	Wylie, Chris	1.83 m (6 ft 0 in)
F	11	(New Zealand)	Leger, Joshua	2.03 m (6 ft 8 in)
G	13	(New Zealand)	Riley, Zach	1.96 m (6 ft 5 in)
F/C	14	(New Zealand)	Loe, Robert (C)	2.11 m (6 ft 11 in)
F/C	15	(New Zealand)	Barrow, Nick	2.05 m (6 ft 9 in)
G/F	20	(New Zealand)	Te Ratana, Cooper	1.96 m (6 ft 5 in)
G	22	(New Zealand)	Dallow, Gus	1.83 m (6 ft 0 in)
G	25	(New Zealand)	Jackowski, Bart	1.93 m (6 ft 4 in)
F	26	(New Zealand)	Dalton, Matthew	1.98 m (6 ft 6 in)
F	32	(New Zealand)	Vodanovich, Tom	2.01 m (6 ft 7 in)
G/F	39	(Tonga)	Latu, Talanoa	1.90 m (6 ft 3 in)
F	42	(New Zealand)	Fotu, Dan	2.01 m (6 ft 7 in)
G/F	95	(New Zealand)	Rasmussen, Noah	1.91 m (6 ft 3 in)

Head coach

- (Australia) Cameron Gliddon

Assistant coach(es)

- (United States) Justin Bailey
- (New Zealand) Sione Maama

Legend

- (C) Team captain
- (DP) Development player
- (IN) Inactive
- (I) Import player
- Injured

- Roster
Updated: 1 June 2025

=== Canterbury Rams ===
Note: Flags indicate national team eligibility at FIBA-sanctioned events. Players may hold other non-FIBA nationalities not displayed.

Canterbury Rams roster
Players
Coaches

Pos.	No.	Nat.	Name	Ht.
G	00	(New Zealand)	Bond, Jonty	1.84 m (6 ft 0 in)
G	1	(New Zealand)	Cate, Tawhiri	1.86 m (6 ft 1 in)
G	2	(New Zealand)	Smith, Sam	1.96 m (6 ft 5 in)
F	4	(New Zealand)	Martin, Mana	1.92 m (6 ft 4 in)
G	5	(New Zealand)	Britt, Taylor (C)	1.88 m (6 ft 2 in)
F	7	(New Zealand)	Brown, Walter	1.94 m (6 ft 4 in)
G	8	(New Zealand)	Isaac, Tama	1.88 m (6 ft 2 in)
G	9	(New Zealand)	De Geest, Max	1.90 m (6 ft 3 in)
F	10	(New Zealand)	Cate, Ihaka	1.96 m (6 ft 5 in)
G	11	(New Zealand)	Isaac, Kaia	1.85 m (6 ft 1 in)
F	12	(New Zealand)	Darling, Maxwell	1.96 m (6 ft 5 in)
G	13	(Australia)	Macdonald, Sean (I)	1.88 m (6 ft 2 in)
F	14	(Australia)	Bowen, Kyle (I)	2.04 m (6 ft 8 in)
F	16	(New Zealand)	Holmes, Jake	2.01 m (6 ft 7 in)
F	17	(United States)	Penha, CJ (I)	2.01 m (6 ft 7 in)
F	18	(New Zealand)	Smith-Milner, Tohi	2.05 m (6 ft 9 in)
F	21	(New Zealand)	Worthington, Tony	2.01 m (6 ft 7 in)
F/C	24	(New Zealand)	Mason, Corban	2.03 m (6 ft 8 in)
F	30	(New Zealand)	Sula, Marco	1.95 m (6 ft 5 in)
G		(New Zealand)	Cooper, Brody

Head coach

- (New Zealand) Quinn Clinton

Assistant coach(es)

- (New Zealand) Liam Connelly
- (New Zealand) Ben Sheat

Legend

- (C) Team captain
- (DP) Development player
- (I) Import player
- Injured

- Roster
Updated: 17 May 2025

=== Franklin Bulls ===
Note: Flags indicate national team eligibility at FIBA-sanctioned events. Players may hold other non-FIBA nationalities not displayed.

Franklin Bulls roster
Players
Coaches

Pos.	No.	Nat.	Name	Ht.
G	1	(United States)	Hardy, Tae (injured) (I)	1.90 m (6 ft 3 in)
G	2	(New Zealand)	Perry, Corey	1.85 m (6 ft 1 in)
F	3	(New Zealand)	Jones, Marcel	2.03 m (6 ft 8 in)
G	4	(New Zealand)	Vano, Christian	1.90 m (6 ft 3 in)
G	5	(New Zealand)	Coker-Grey, Harri	1.94 m (6 ft 4 in)
G	6	(New Zealand)	Savill, Hunter (DP)	1.85 m (6 ft 1 in)
F	9	(New Zealand)	Maile, Halasiale	1.89 m (6 ft 2 in)
F	10	(Australia)	Okwera, David (I)	2.08 m (6 ft 10 in)
G	11	(New Zealand)	Cameron, Tobias	1.96 m (6 ft 5 in)
G/F	12	(New Zealand)	Rusbatch, Ethan (C)	1.96 m (6 ft 5 in)
F	15	(New Zealand)	Hunt, Jordan	2.06 m (6 ft 9 in)
C	18	(Germany)	Gloger, Till (I)	2.04 m (6 ft 8 in)
G	21	(New Zealand)	Cameron, Flynn	1.96 m (6 ft 5 in)
F	23	(Nigeria)	Nwafor, Kenechukwu	2.02 m (6 ft 8 in)
G	24	(New Zealand)	Hughes, Payton	1.80 m (5 ft 11 in)
G	25	(New Zealand)	Anderson, Zion	1.93 m (6 ft 4 in)
G		(New Zealand)	Kelso, Harrison	1.93 m (6 ft 4 in)
F		(New Zealand)	Macfarlane, Jaxson	1.96 m (6 ft 5 in)
F		(New Zealand)	Otunuku, Ezekiel (DP)	1.96 m (6 ft 5 in)
G		(New Zealand)	Williams, Noah	1.91 m (6 ft 3 in)

Head coach

- (Germany) Sebastian Gleim

Assistant coach(es)

- (New Zealand) Joseph Reddish
- (New Zealand) Samara Funnell

Legend

- (C) Team captain
- (DP) Development player
- (I) Import player
- Injured

- Roster
Updated: 5 July 2025

=== Hawke's Bay Hawks ===
Note: Flags indicate national team eligibility at FIBA-sanctioned events. Players may hold other non-FIBA nationalities not displayed.

Hawke's Bay Hawks roster
Players
Coaches

Pos.	No.	Nat.	Name	Ht.
G	0	(New Zealand)	Cartwright, Kade	1.94 m (6 ft 4 in)
G	1	(New Zealand)	Godinet, Montell	1.91 m (6 ft 3 in)
G	2	(New Zealand)	Taylor, Maz	1.93 m (6 ft 4 in)
F	3	(New Zealand)	Kara, Kobe	1.91 m (6 ft 3 in)
G	4	(New Zealand)	Singh, Lennox	1.80 m (5 ft 11 in)
F	5	(New Zealand)	Keighley, Harry	2.01 m (6 ft 7 in)
G	6	(New Zealand)	Scott, Campbell	1.88 m (6 ft 2 in)
G	7	(New Zealand)	Murphy, Jacob	1.88 m (6 ft 2 in)
G	9	(New Zealand)	Ball, Jackson	1.91 m (6 ft 3 in)
G/F	10	(Australia)	Swaka Lo Buluk, Wani (I & C)	1.98 m (6 ft 6 in)
G/F	11	(Australia)	Grida, Daniel (I)	1.97 m (6 ft 6 in)
G/F	12	(New Zealand)	Allan, Isaac	1.98 m (6 ft 6 in)
G	15	(New Zealand)	Smiler, Zoram	1.85 m (6 ft 1 in)
F	17	(New Zealand)	Bush, Clifton	1.98 m (6 ft 6 in)
F	18	(New Zealand)	Treacher, Kahu	2.06 m (6 ft 9 in)
F/C	19	(New Zealand)	Yates, Luca	2.08 m (6 ft 10 in)
G	23	(New Zealand)	Moore, Ryder	1.85 m (6 ft 1 in)
F	24	(New Zealand)	Eagle, Ezrah	1.93 m (6 ft 4 in)
G	30	(New Zealand)	Stent, George	1.84 m (6 ft 0 in)
G	42	(United States)	Alston, Brandon (I)	1.96 m (6 ft 5 in)
F	50	(New Zealand)	Matakatea, Dante	1.94 m (6 ft 4 in)
G		(New Zealand)	Cox, Isaac	1.78 m (5 ft 10 in)

Head coach

- (Australia) Sam Gruggen

Assistant coach(es)

- (New Zealand) Aidan Daly
- (New Zealand) Kaine Hokianga

Legend

- (C) Team captain
- (DP) Development player
- (IN) Inactive
- (I) Import player
- Injured

- Roster
Updated: 7 June 2025

=== Manawatu Jets ===
Note: Flags indicate national team eligibility at FIBA-sanctioned events. Players may hold other non-FIBA nationalities not displayed.

Manawatu Jets roster
Players
Coaches

Pos.	No.	Nat.	Name	Ht.
G	1	(New Zealand)	Thata-Paese, Tyson	1.89 m (6 ft 2 in)
F	2	(United States)	Gibson, Miles (I)	1.98 m (6 ft 6 in)
F	3	(New Zealand)	Miller-Jose, Isaac	2.03 m (6 ft 8 in)
G	4	(New Zealand)	Russo-Nance, Dontae	1.90 m (6 ft 3 in)
F	6	(New Zealand)	Wynyard, Tautoko	2.08 m (6 ft 10 in)
G/F	7	(United States)	Rose, Quinton (I)	2.03 m (6 ft 8 in)
F	8	(New Zealand)	Lambert, Hikaia	1.96 m (6 ft 5 in)
G	9	(New Zealand)	Webster, Corey (injured)	1.88 m (6 ft 2 in)
F	11	(New Zealand)	Collins, Dion	2.03 m (6 ft 8 in)
F	13	(New Zealand)	Crowley, Joshua
F	15	(New Zealand)	Henry, Leon	2.00 m (6 ft 7 in)
G	22	(New Zealand)	Carr, Hayden
F	24	(New Zealand)	Foss, Matthew
F	25	(United States)	Goins, Kenny (I & C)	2.01 m (6 ft 7 in)
G/F	32	(New Zealand)	Pearce, Dominic	1.96 m (6 ft 5 in)
G/F	36	(New Zealand)	Hipango, Matangirei	1.93 m (6 ft 4 in)
F	42	(New Zealand)	Te Huki, Kairangi	1.98 m (6 ft 6 in)
G	45	(Zimbabwe)	Matambanadzo, Tinashe	1.78 m (5 ft 10 in)

Head coach

- (United States) Tony Webster

Assistant coach(es)

- (New Zealand) Rob Hartley
- (New Zealand) Tim Mctamney

Legend

- (C) Team captain
- (DP) Development player
- (I) Import player
- Injured

- Roster
Updated: 22 June 2025

=== Nelson Giants ===
Note: Flags indicate national team eligibility at FIBA-sanctioned events. Players may hold other non-FIBA nationalities not displayed.

Nelson Giants roster
Players
Coaches

Pos.	No.	Nat.	Name	Ht.
G	0	(New Zealand)	McNaught, Alex	1.85 m (6 ft 1 in)
F	1	(United States)	Combs, Jeremy (I)	2.01 m (6 ft 7 in)
G	2	(New Zealand)	Adams, Cooper	1.90 m (6 ft 3 in)
G	5	(United States)	Robinson, Alex (I)	1.85 m (6 ft 1 in)
G	6	(New Zealand)	Williams, Coen	1.80 m (5 ft 11 in)
F	7	(New Zealand)	Chamberlain, Kaleb	2.01 m (6 ft 7 in)
F	10	(New Zealand)	Dempster, Sam (C)	1.94 m (6 ft 4 in)
F	13	(New Zealand)	Jones, Hayden	1.97 m (6 ft 6 in)
G/F	15	(New Zealand)	Crate, Lachlan	1.98 m (6 ft 6 in)
F	16	(New Zealand)	Blight, Will	2.05 m (6 ft 9 in)
F	23	(New Zealand)	Inwood, Ashton	1.91 m (6 ft 3 in)
C	25	(New Zealand)	McRae, Callum	2.16 m (7 ft 1 in)
G	35	(New Zealand)	Matthews, James	1.84 m (6 ft 0 in)
G	41	(United States)	Jones, Andrew (I)	1.93 m (6 ft 4 in)
F	67	(New Zealand)	Judd, Liam	1.96 m (6 ft 5 in)
G		(New Zealand)	Varricchio, Rico

Head coach

- (New Zealand) Michael Fitchett

Assistant coach(es)

- (New Zealand) Tom Gargiulo
- (New Zealand) Phill Jones

Legend

- (C) Team captain
- (DP) Development player
- (I) Import player
- Injured

- Roster
Updated: 16 May 2025

=== Otago Nuggets ===
Note: Flags indicate national team eligibility at FIBA-sanctioned events. Players may hold other non-FIBA nationalities not displayed.

Otago Nuggets roster
Players
Coaches

Pos.	No.	Nat.	Name	Ht.
F	0	(New Zealand)	Freeman, Patrick	1.98 m (6 ft 6 in)
F	2	(New Zealand)	Janssen, Jonathan	2.06 m (6 ft 9 in)
F	4	(New Zealand)	Bezett, Harrison
G	6	(New Zealand)	Ruske, Michael	1.80 m (5 ft 11 in)
G	7	(New Zealand)	Bardsley, Matthew	1.89 m (6 ft 2 in)
G	9	(New Zealand)	Knox, Darcy (C)	1.86 m (6 ft 1 in)
G	10	(New Zealand)	Smiler, Caleb	1.91 m (6 ft 3 in)
G	11	(United States)	Carey, Donald (I)	1.96 m (6 ft 5 in)
F	12	(New Zealand)	Stodart, Mac	2.03 m (6 ft 8 in)
F	13	(New Zealand)	Aitcheson, Josh	1.97 m (6 ft 6 in)
G	14	(New Zealand)	Ashcroft, Danyon
F	21	(New Zealand)	Martin, Christian	1.87 m (6 ft 2 in)
F	22	(New Zealand)	Boomer, Liam
G	24	(New Zealand)	Mcdowall, Noah
F	42	(United States)	Sebree, Jaylen (I)	2.01 m (6 ft 7 in)
G		(New Zealand)	Chisholm, Oak

Head coach

- (United States) Mike Kelly

Assistant coach(es)

- (New Zealand) Levi Cockroft
- (New Zealand) Jeffery Sparrow

Legend

- (C) Team captain
- (DP) Development player
- (I) Import player
- Injured

- Roster
Updated: 13 June 2025

=== Southland Sharks ===
Note: Flags indicate national team eligibility at FIBA-sanctioned events. Players may hold other non-FIBA nationalities not displayed.

Southland Sharks roster
Players
Coaches

Pos.	No.	Nat.	Name	Ht.
F	2	(New Zealand)	Leger, Will	2.03 m (6 ft 8 in)
F	3	(New Zealand)	Inger, Brayden	2.03 m (6 ft 8 in)
G	4	(New Zealand)	Burton, Alonzo (C)	1.93 m (6 ft 4 in)
G	5	(United States)	Asberry, Caleb (I)	1.90 m (6 ft 3 in)
G	6	(New Zealand)	Ramage, Jack	1.95 m (6 ft 5 in)
G	7	(New Zealand)	Riwhi, Joseph	1.82 m (6 ft 0 in)
G	8	(New Zealand)	Helu, Johnny	1.88 m (6 ft 2 in)
G	10	(New Zealand)	Webster, Quake	1.78 m (5 ft 10 in)
G	13	(New Zealand)	Bertinshaw, Dane	1.94 m (6 ft 4 in)
G	14	(New Zealand)	Cooper, Tukaha	1.90 m (6 ft 3 in)
F	15	(New Zealand)	Snow, Riley	1.98 m (6 ft 6 in)
F	20	(United States)	Boone, Keylan (I)	2.03 m (6 ft 8 in)
F/C	33	(New Zealand)	Timmins, Sam	2.11 m (6 ft 11 in)
F	51	(New Zealand)	Collier, Hayden	2.08 m (6 ft 10 in)
F	53	(United States)	Allick, Josiah (I)	2.03 m (6 ft 8 in)

Head coach

- (United States) Jonathan Yim

Assistant coach(es)

- (New Zealand) John Auld
- (New Zealand) Connor Coll
- (New Zealand) Aled Jones
- (New Zealand) Andrew Wheeler

Team manager

- (New Zealand) Daryl Greig

Legend

- (C) Team captain
- (DP) Development player
- (IN) Inactive
- (I) Import player
- Injured

- Roster
Updated: 19 May 2025

=== Taranaki Airs ===
Note: Flags indicate national team eligibility at FIBA-sanctioned events. Players may hold other non-FIBA nationalities not displayed.

Taranaki Airs roster
Players
Coaches

Pos.	No.	Nat.	Name	Ht.
G	0	(New Zealand)	Exeter, Jack	1.85 m (6 ft 1 in)
F	1	(New Zealand)	Telfer, Scott	1.96 m (6 ft 5 in)
G	2	(New Zealand)	Davison, Carlin (C)	1.96 m (6 ft 5 in)
G	3	(New Zealand)	Gerrand, Jaylen	1.83 m (6 ft 0 in)
F	4	(New Zealand)	Tamatea, Jerome
F	6	(New Zealand)	Tuhaka, Lyric
G	7	(United States)	Fletcher, Armon (I)	1.96 m (6 ft 5 in)
G	8	(New Zealand)	Tuuta, Riley	1.90 m (6 ft 3 in)
G	9	(New Zealand)	Adam, Zavier	1.86 m (6 ft 1 in)
G	11	(Australia)	Dut, Deng (I)	1.93 m (6 ft 4 in)
F	13	(Australia)	Moller, Craig (I)	2.03 m (6 ft 8 in)
C	21	(New Zealand)	Andrew, Jack	2.08 m (6 ft 10 in)
F	25	(New Zealand)	Kelman-Poto, Dominique	2.01 m (6 ft 7 in)
F	32	(New Zealand)	Bailey, Quintin	2.01 m (6 ft 7 in)
F	34	(New Zealand)	Quinnell, Cameron	2.01 m (6 ft 7 in)
F	60	(New Zealand)	Te Rini, Shaun

Head coach

- (Australia) Sam Mackinnon

Assistant coach(es)

- (New Zealand) Andrew Green
- (New Zealand) Trent Adam

Legend

- (C) Team captain
- (DP) Development player
- (I) Import player
- Injured

- Roster
Updated: 5 June 2025

=== Tauranga Whai ===
Note: Flags indicate national team eligibility at FIBA-sanctioned events. Players may hold other non-FIBA nationalities not displayed.

Tauranga Whai (NZNBL) roster
Players
Coaches

Pos.	No.	Nat.	Name	Ht.
F/C	1	(New Zealand)	Rissetto, Anzac	2.08 m (6 ft 10 in)
G/F	2	(New Zealand)	Boucher, Jayden	1.88 m (6 ft 2 in)
G	3	(New Zealand)	King, Mojave	1.96 m (6 ft 5 in)
G	4	(New Zealand)	Thompson, Jett	1.91 m (6 ft 3 in)
G	5	(New Zealand)	Perrott-Hunt, Kruz (C)	1.91 m (6 ft 3 in)
G	6	(New Zealand)	Flavell, C. J.	1.88 m (6 ft 2 in)
G/F	7	(Australia)	Bairstow, Sean (I)	2.03 m (6 ft 8 in)
G	8	(New Zealand)	Marsters, Xanda	1.88 m (6 ft 2 in)
F/C	10	(New Zealand)	Brooke, Denhym	2.03 m (6 ft 8 in)
F	11	(New Zealand)	Davis, Liam
G	12	(New Zealand)	Greensill, Maioro	1.80 m (5 ft 11 in)
G	13	(New Zealand)	Lewis, Te Tuhi	1.90 m (6 ft 3 in)
F	14	(New Zealand)	Kaumoana, Ky-Mani	1.90 m (6 ft 3 in)
F	21	(New Zealand)	Murphy, Sean	1.98 m (6 ft 6 in)
F	27	(New Zealand)	Hopoi, Carter	2.07 m (6 ft 9 in)
G	31	(New Zealand)	Wade, Michael
G	32	(New Zealand)	Black, Javier	1.86 m (6 ft 1 in)
G	66	(New Zealand)	Bezzant, Jayden	1.88 m (6 ft 2 in)
G		(New Zealand)	Pakaurangi, Taiapau	1.85 m (6 ft 1 in)
G		(New Zealand)	Roudon, Harlan

Head coach

- (New Zealand) Matt Lacey

Assistant coach(es)

- (New Zealand) Tane Bennett
- (New Zealand) Doug Courtney
- (New Zealand) Alex Stojkovic

Legend

- (C) Team captain
- (DP) Development player
- (I) Import player
- Injured

- Roster
Updated: 21 June 2025

Note: Flags indicate national team eligibility at FIBA-sanctioned events. Players may hold other non-FIBA nationalities not displayed.

Tauranga Whai (Tauihi) roster
Players
Coaches

Pos.	No.	Nat.	Name	Ht.
G/F	3	(United States)	Cowling, Mikayla	1.88 m (6 ft 2 in)
G	4	(New Zealand)	Hokianga, Pahlyss	1.64 m (5 ft 5 in)
SG	5	(New Zealand)	Smiler, Kaylee	1.77 m (5 ft 10 in)
C	6	(Australia)	McSpadden, Lara	1.93 m (6 ft 4 in)
SF	7	(New Zealand)	Langton, Eva	1.85 m (6 ft 1 in)
G	8	(New Zealand)	Rogers, Emma	1.77 m (5 ft 10 in)
G	9	(New Zealand)	Dale, McKenna	1.83 m (6 ft 0 in)
G	10	(New Zealand)	Hyland, Anika	1.72 m (5 ft 8 in)
G	11	(Australia)	Kirisome, Jade	1.72 m (5 ft 8 in)
PF	14	(United States)	Synder, Laina	1.85 m (6 ft 1 in)
G	16	(New Zealand)	Kuka, Laura	1.75 m (5 ft 9 in)
G	18	(New Zealand)	Taingahue, Maya	1.70 m (5 ft 7 in)
F	20	(United States)	Joens, Ashley	1.83 m (6 ft 0 in)
G	24	(Australia)	Yaeger, Morgan	1.75 m (5 ft 9 in)
G	44	(Australia)	Dale, McKenna	1.75 m (5 ft 9 in)
F	99	(New Zealand)	Daysh, Maka	1.85 m (6 ft 1 in)

Head coach

- (New Zealand) Alex Stojkovic

Assistant coach(es)

- (New Zealand) Tane Bennett

Legend

- (C) Team captain
- (DP) Development player
- (I) Import player
- Injured

- Roster
Updated: 13 September 2024

=== Wellington Saints ===
Note: Flags indicate national team eligibility at FIBA-sanctioned events. Players may hold other non-FIBA nationalities not displayed.

Wellington Saints roster
Players
Coaches

Pos.	No.	Nat.	Name	Ht.
F	0	(New Zealand)	Heke, Tyrael-Cage	2.06 m (6 ft 9 in)
F	1	(Australia)	Marshall, Nick (I)	1.98 m (6 ft 6 in)
G	2	(New Zealand)	Le'afa, Izayah	1.88 m (6 ft 2 in)
F	3	(New Zealand)	Gold, Sam	2.01 m (6 ft 7 in)
G	6	(New Zealand)	Munir, Hassan	1.83 m (6 ft 0 in)
G	7	(Australia)	Bruce, Shaun (I)	1.92 m (6 ft 4 in)
F	8	(New Zealand)	Plumtree, Troy	1.96 m (6 ft 5 in)
F	11	(New Zealand)	Ngatai, Jordan	1.96 m (6 ft 5 in)
G	12	(New Zealand)	Dougall-Mita, Rangimarie	1.91 m (6 ft 3 in)
F	13	(New Zealand)	Harris, Hyrum (C)	2.04 m (6 ft 8 in)
G	16	(New Zealand)	Chunga, Aubrey
F	24	(New Zealand)	Richards, Lukah	2.00 m (6 ft 7 in)
G	25	(New Zealand)	Evans, Kazlo	1.80 m (5 ft 11 in)
G	27	(New Zealand)	Pilcher, Arthur	1.89 m (6 ft 2 in)
C	33	(United States)	Muszynski, Nick (I)	2.11 m (6 ft 11 in)
G	51	(New Zealand)	Ili, Shea (injured)	1.84 m (6 ft 0 in)
G	80	(New Zealand)	Magalogo, Keelan

Head coach

- (New Zealand) Aaron Young

Assistant coach(es)

- (New Zealand) Chris Tupu
- (New Zealand) Jayden Smith

Legend

- (C) Team captain
- (DP) Development player
- (IN) Inactive
- (I) Import player
- Injured

- Roster
Updated: 28 June 2025

== See also ==
- List of current NBL team rosters
