= List of rowing clubs in Australia =

A list of rowing clubs in Australia, sorted by Rowing Australia member association regions. Rowing blades used by each club are shown, if known.

== Australia Capital Territory ==
Rowing ACT

- ACT Academy of Sport Rowing
- Australian Defence Force Academy
- Australian National University Boat Club
- Black Mountain Rowing Club
- Canberra Girls Grammar School Rowing Association
- Canberra Grammar School Rowing Association
- Canberra Rowing Club
- Capital Lakes Rowing Club
- Daramalan College Rowing Club
- Marist College Canberra Rowing Club
- Lake Tuggeranong Rowing Club
- Radford College Rowing Club
- Royal Military College, Duntroon

== New South Wales ==
Rowing NSW

=== Great Public Schools of NSW (AAGPS) Schools ===
- Newington
- Riverview
- St Joseph's College
- Sydney Boys High
- Sydney Grammar
- King's
- Scots
- Shore

=== Other Public Schools ===
- Arthur Phillip High School
- Glebe High School
- Mackellar Girls Campus
- Nowra High School
- Riverside Girls High School
- North Sydney Girls High School
- Sydney Girls High School
- Taree High School
- Winmalee High School
- Wingham High School

=== Independent Schools ===
- Arden Anglican School
- Ascham School
- Cranbrook School
- Kinross Wolaroi School
- Kotara High School
- Loreto Kirribilli
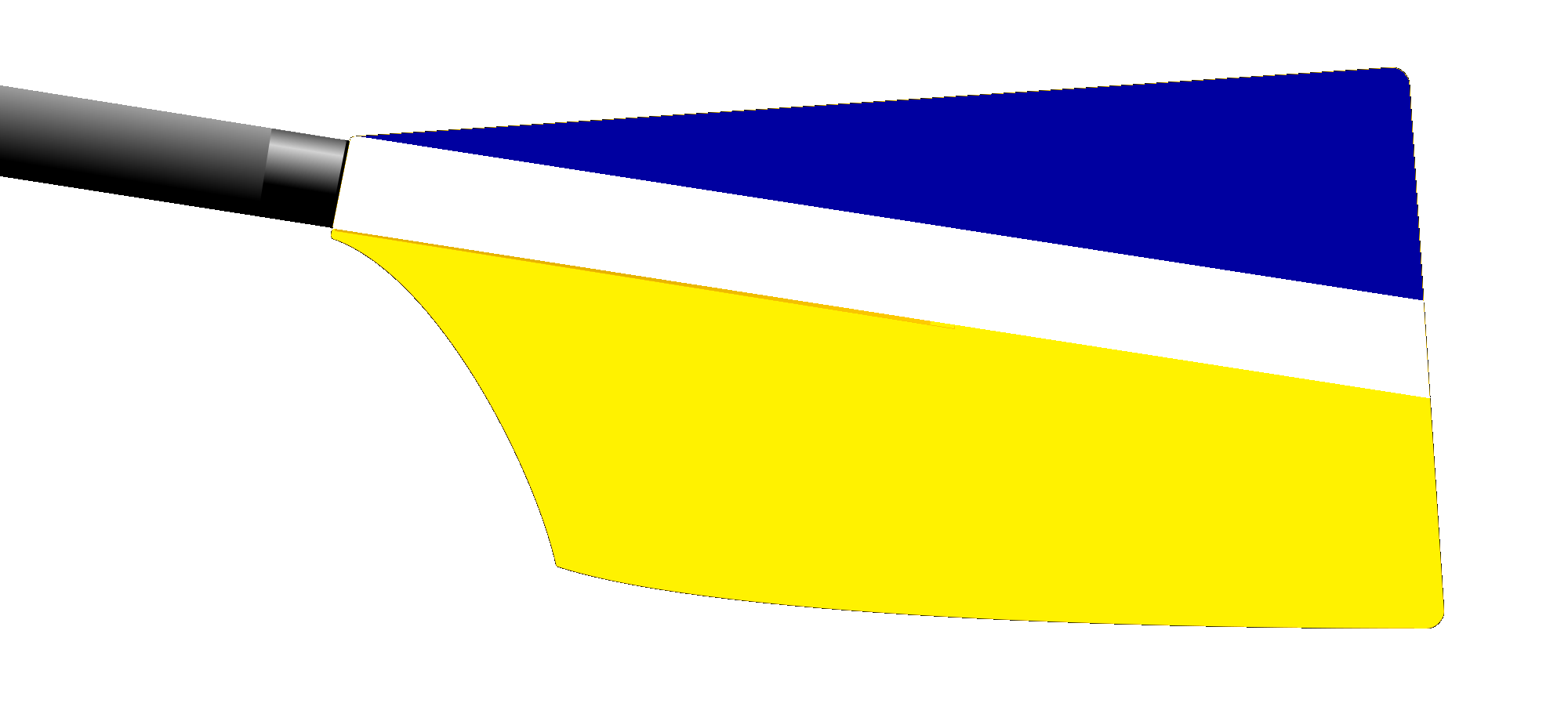
- Loreto Normanhurst
- Macarthur Anglican School
- Maitland Grossmann High School
- Marist Catholic College North Shore
- McAuley Catholic College
- MLC School
- Mount Saint Benedict College
- Nowra Anglican College
- Presbyterian Ladies' College
- Pymble Ladies College
- Queenwood School
- Redlands
- Rosebank College
- Roseville College
- Rouse Hill Anglican College
- Scone Grammar
- Shoalhaven Anglican School
- Shoalhaven High School
- St Andrew's Cathedral School
- St Augustines College
- St Josephs Regional College Port Macquarie
- St Paul's Grammar School
- Tara Anglican School for Girls
- The Illawarra Grammar School
- Trinity Catholic College
- Warners Bay High School
- Westfields Sports High School
- Queenwood School For Girls

=== Metropolitan Clubs ===
- Balmain Rowing Club
- Community Rowing Club
- Drummoyne Rowing Club
- Kinross Wolaroi Rowing Club
- Leichhardt Rowing Club
- Macquarie University Rowing Club
- Mosman Rowing Club
- Nepean Rowing Club
- Newington Masters Rowing Club Inc
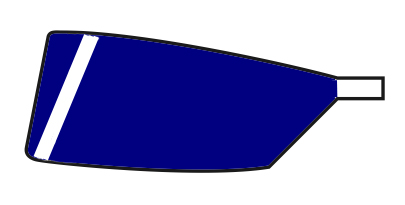
- North Shore Rowing Club
- Old Ignatians Rowing Club
- Penrith Rowing Club
- St George Rowing Club
- Sydney Rowing Club
- Sydney University Boat Club
- Sydney University Womens Boat Club
- Sydney Womens MLC Rowing Club
- Tara Boat Club
- The Lakes Rowers
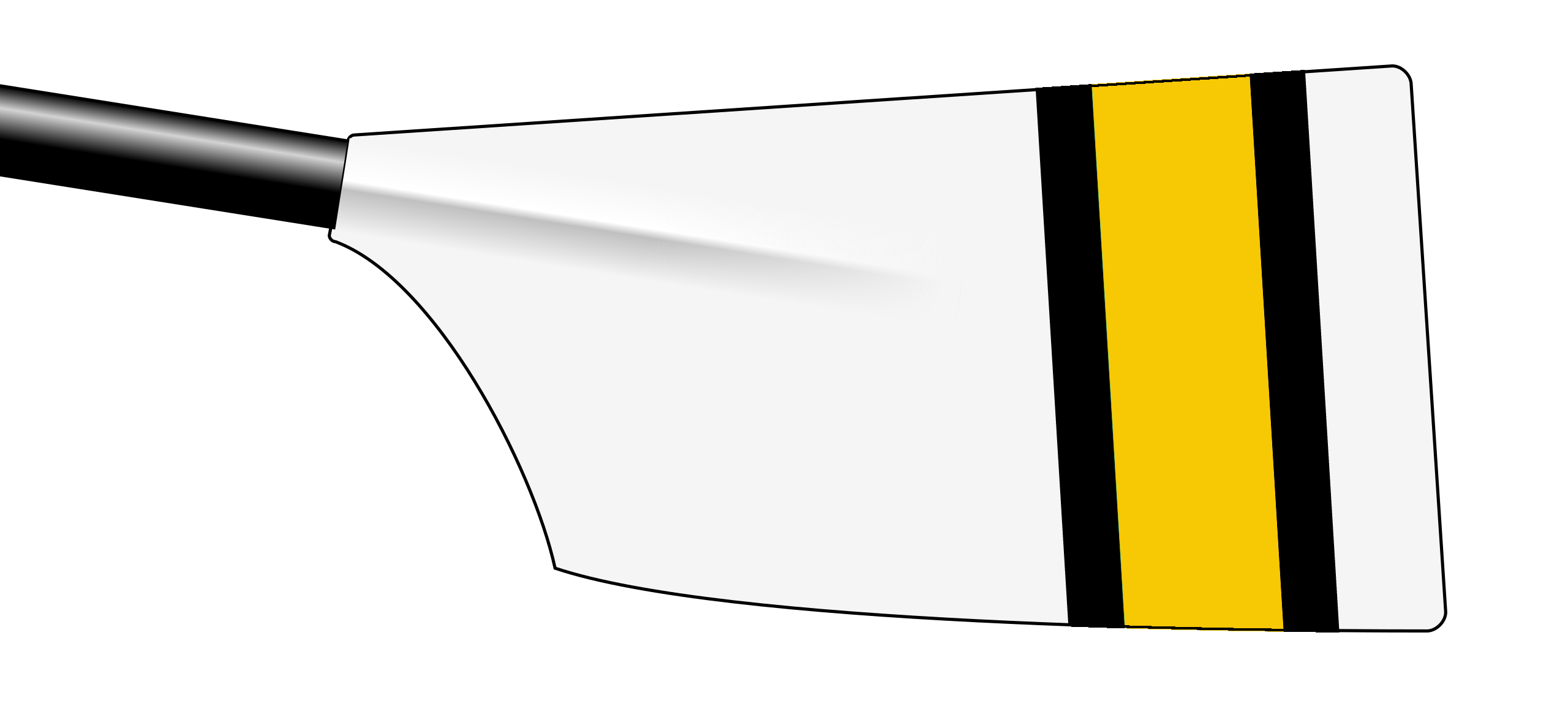
- University of NSW Rowing Club
- UTS Haberfield Rowing Club

=== Northern Rivers Clubs ===
- Grafton High School
- Grafton Rowing Club
- Iluka Rowing & Aquatic Club
- Lismore Rowing Club
- Lower Clarence Amateur RC
- Maclean High School
- Murwillumbah Rowing Club
- Richmond River Sailing & Rowing Club
- South Grafton High School

=== Central District Clubs ===
- Armidale Rowing Club
- Brisbane Water Rowing Club
- Central Coast Rowing Club
- Endeavour Rowing Club
- Hastings Regional Rowing Club
- Hunter Valley Grammar School
- Lake Macquarie Rowing Club
- Manning River Rowing Club
- Newcastle Grammar School
- Newcastle Rowing Club
- Newcastle University Boat Club
- Port Macquarie Rowing Club
- Upper Hunter Rowing Club

=== Independent Clubs ===
- Brisbane Water Rowing Club
- Shellharbour City Rowing Club
- Shoalhaven Rowing Club

== Queensland ==
Rowing Queensland

=== Greater Public Schools Association of Queensland ===
- Anglican Church Grammar School
- Brisbane Boys College
- Brisbane Grammar School
- Brisbane State High School
- St Joseph's College, Gregory Terrace
- St Joseph's College, Nudgee
- The Southport School

=== North Queensland ===
- Cairns Rowing Club, Trinity Inlet
- Innisfail Rowing Club, Johnstone River
- Mackay Rowing Club, Pioneer River
- Riverway Rowing Club, Ross River
- Tablelands Country Rowing Club, Lake Tinaroo
- Townsville & James Cook University Rowing Club, Aplins Weir

=== Sunshine Coast ===
- Boreen Point Rowers, Lake Cootharaba
- Noosa Boat Club, Lake Macdonald
- Noosa Yacht and Rowing Club, Noosa River
- Sunshine Coast Rowing Club, Maroochy River
- Maroochy River Rowing Club, Maroochy River

=== Central Queensland ===
- Bundaberg Rowing Club, Burnett River and Bullyard Creek
- Grammarians Rowing Club, Fitzroy River
- Rockhampton Fitzroy Rowing Club, Fitzroy River
- Wide Bay Rowing Club Inc.
- 1770 Dragons, 1770 Agnes Water

=== Metropolitan ===
- Brisbane & GPS Rowing Club, Brisbane River
- Brisbane Grammarians Rowing Club, Brisbane River
- Centenary Rowing Club, Brisbane River
- Coastal Rowing and Touring Australia Inc
- College Masters Rowing Club, Brisbane River
- Commercial Rowing Club, Brisbane River
- Dragons Rowing Club, Breakfast Creek/ Brisbane River
- Dutton Park Rowing & Supporters Club, Brisbane River
- Kand Rowing Club, Brisbane River
- Lourdes Rowing Club, Brisbane River
- Pine Rivers Rowing Club, Lake Kurwongbah
- Redlegs Rowing Club, Brisbane River
- Rivercity Womens Rowing Club, Brisbane River
- Tattersall's Rowing Club, Brisbane River
- Toowong Rowing Club, Brisbane River
- University of Queensland Boat Club, Brisbane River
- Vintage Vikings Rowing Club, Brisbane River
- VOMITS, Brisbane River

=== Gold Coast ===
- Bond University Rowing Club, Lake Orr
- Coomera Watersports Club, Coomera River
- Gold Coast Masters Rowers, Lake Orr
- Griffith University Surfers Paradise Rowing Club, Nerang River
- Murwillimbah Rowing Club, Tweed River
- Oxenford Rowing Club, Coomera River
- Somerset Boat Club
- Tweed Heads and Coolangatta Rowing Club, Terranora Inlet

== South Australia ==
Rowing South Australia

- Adelaide High School
- Adelaide Rowing Club
- Adelaide University Boat Club
- Berri Rowing Club
- Christian Brothers College
- Goolwa Rowing Club
- Limestone Coast Rowing
- Loreto College Rowing Club
- Mannum Rowing Club
- Murray Bridge Rowing Club
- Norwood Morialta High School
- Ocean View College Rowing Club
- Pembroke School
- Phoenix Rowing Club
- Port Adelaide Rowing Club
- Port Pirie Rowing Club
- Prince Alfred College
- Pulteney Grammar School
- Renmark Rowing Club
- Riverside Rowing Club
- Scotch College
- Seymour College
- South Port Surf Life Saving Club Inc
- Saint Ignatius' College
- St Michaels College Rowing Club
- St Peter's College
- St Peter's Girls College Rowing Club
- Tailem Bend Rowing Club
- Torrens Rowing Club
- Unley Boat Club
- Unley High School
- Waikerie Rowing Club
- Walford Anglican School for Girls
- Wallaroo Rowing Club
- Wilderness School

== Tasmania ==
Rowing Tasmania

- Derwent Mercantile Collegiate Rowing Club
- Fahan School
- Huon Rowing Club
- Lindisfarne Rowing Club
- New Norfolk Rowing Club
- Sandy Bay Rowing Club
- St Mary's College, Hobart
- St Virgil's College
- Tamar Rowing Club
- Tasmanian Institute of Sport
- Tasmania University Boat Club
- The Friends School
- The Hutchins School
- University of Tasmania Launceston Boat Club

== Victoria ==
Rowing Victoria

=== Associations ===
- Ballarat Rowing Association
- Head of the Schoolgirls Regatta
- Rowing Geelong
- Murray Rowing Association

=== Clubs ===
- Aikman Club
- 1907 TC Boat Club
- Albert Park - South Melbourne Rowing Club
- Anglesea Recreation & Sports Club
- Bairnsdale Rowing Club
- Ballarat City Rowing Club
- Banks Rowing Club
- Barwon Rowing Club
- Bendigo Rowing Club
- Cardinal Rowing Club
- Carrum Rowing Club
- Caulfield Grammarians Rowing Club
- City of Warrnambool Rowing Club
- Corio Bay Rowing Club
- Corowa Rowing Club
- Dimboola Rowing Club
- Essendon Rowing Club
- Footscray City Rowing Club
- Hamilton Rowing Club
- Hawthorn Rowing Club
- Horsham City Rowing Club
- Lake Colac Rowing Club
- La Trobe University Boat Club
- Melbourne Argonauts Rowing Club
- Melbourne Rowing Club
- Melbourne University Boat Club
- Mercantile Rowing Club
- Mildura Rowing Club
- Nagambie Rowing Club
- Old Melburnians Rowing Club
- The Pirates (rowing club)
- Powerhouse Rowing Club
- Ramsey-Morris Club
- Richmond Rowing Club
- Rutherglen Rowing Club
- Sale Rowing Club
- Shepparton Rowing Club
- Wahgunyah Rowing Club
- Wendouree Ballarat Rowing Club
- Wentworth District Rowing Club
- Y Rowing Club
- Yarra Yarra Rowing Club
- Yarrawonga Rowing Club

=== Schools ===
- Ballarat Clarendon College
- Ballarat Grammar School
- Ballarat High School
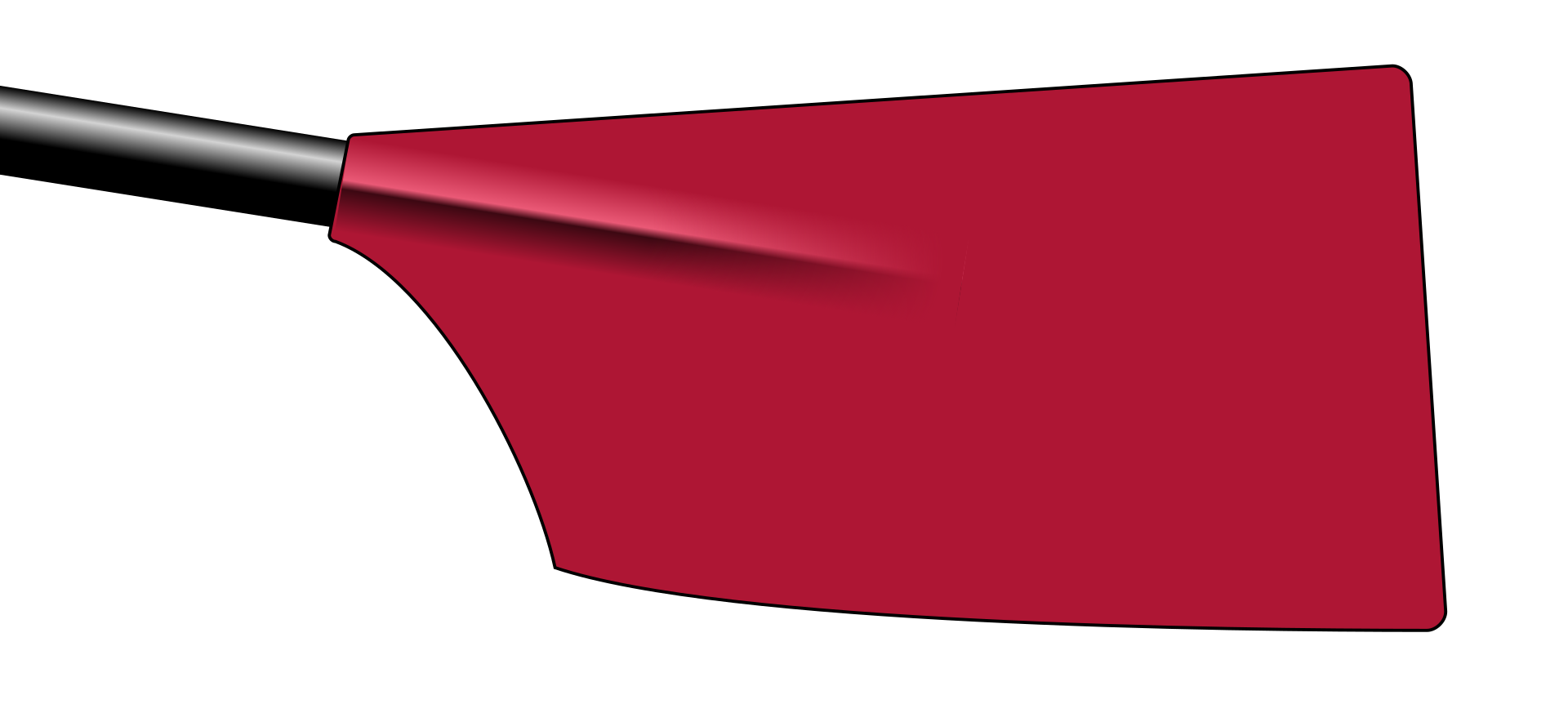
- Brighton Grammar School
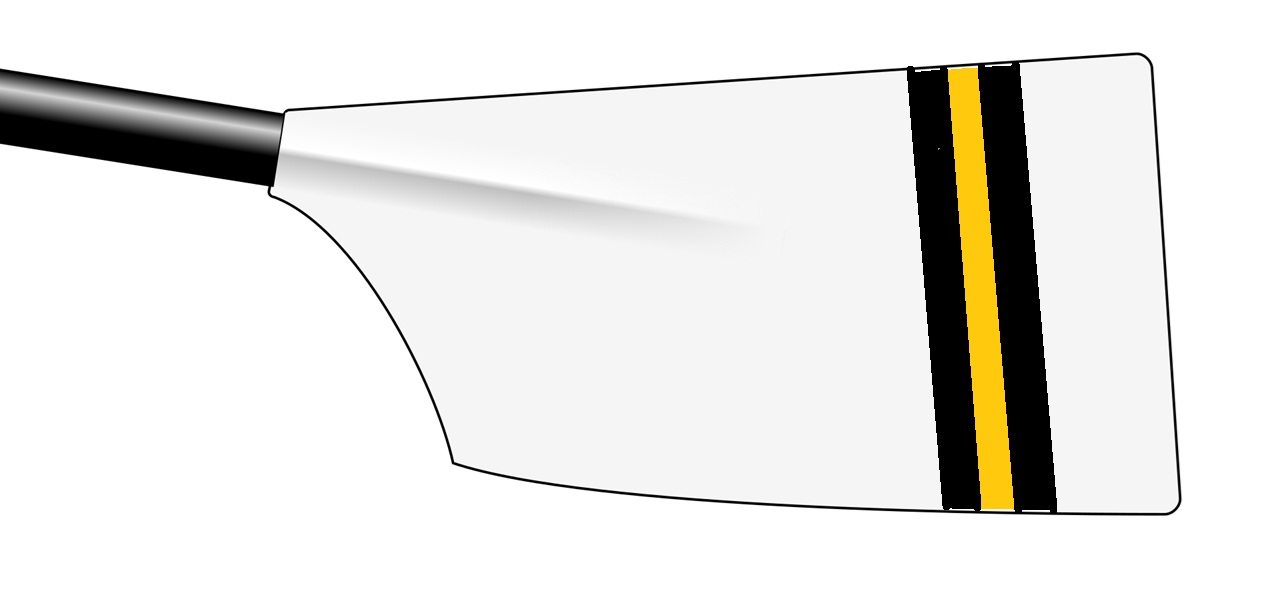
- Carey Baptist Grammar School
- Catholic College - Sale
- Caulfield Grammar School
- Christian College Geelong
- Clonard College
- Damascus College Ballarat
- Emmanuel College, Melbourne
- Fintona Girls' School
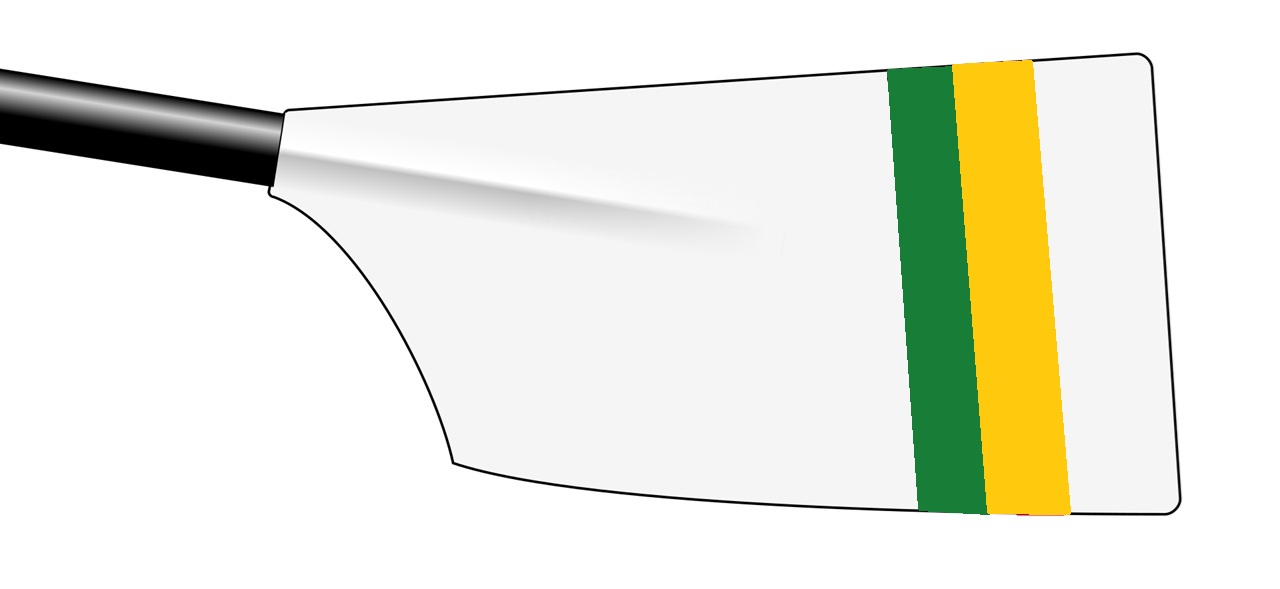
- Firbank Grammar School
- Frankston High School
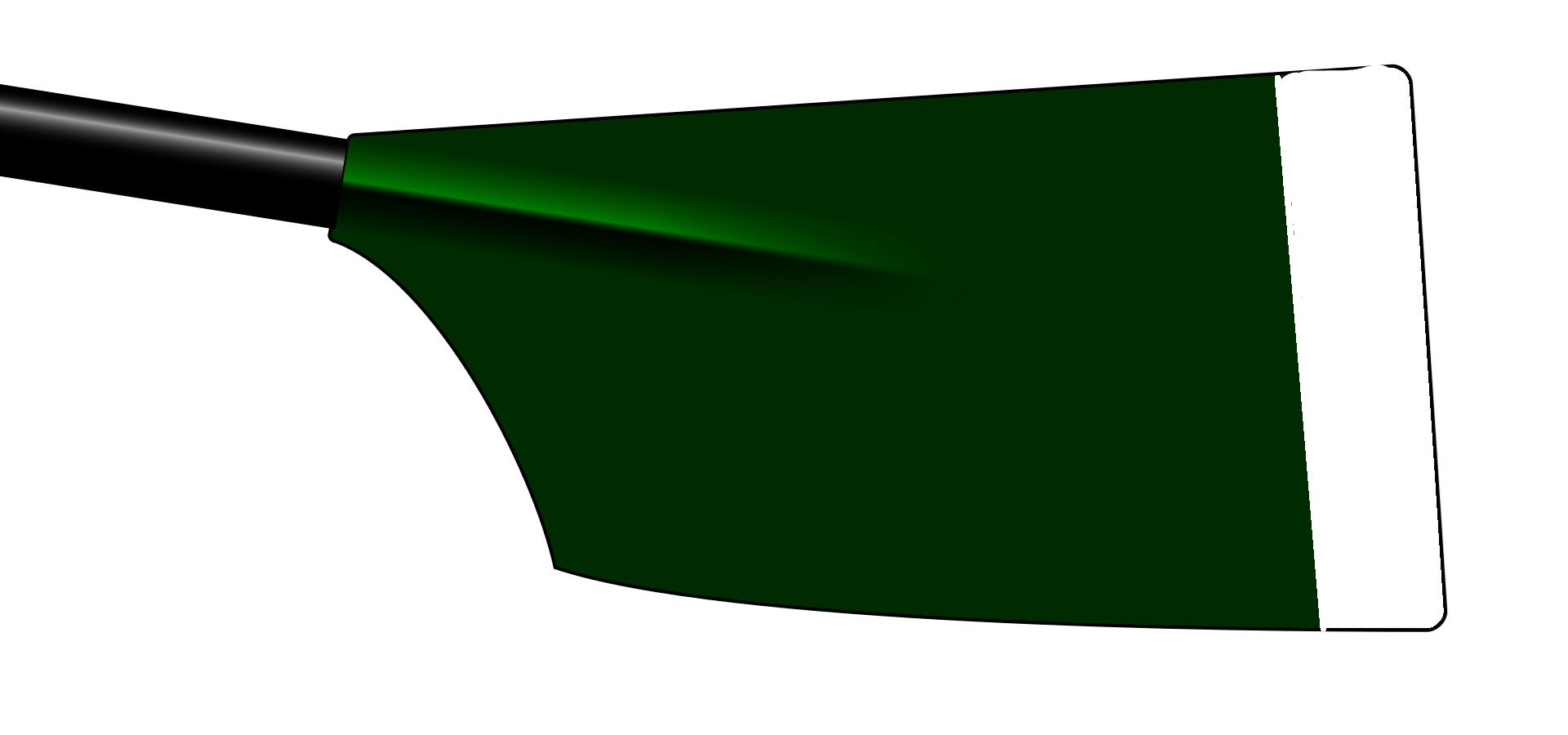
- Geelong College
- Geelong Grammar School
- Genazzano FCJ College
- Gippsland Grammar
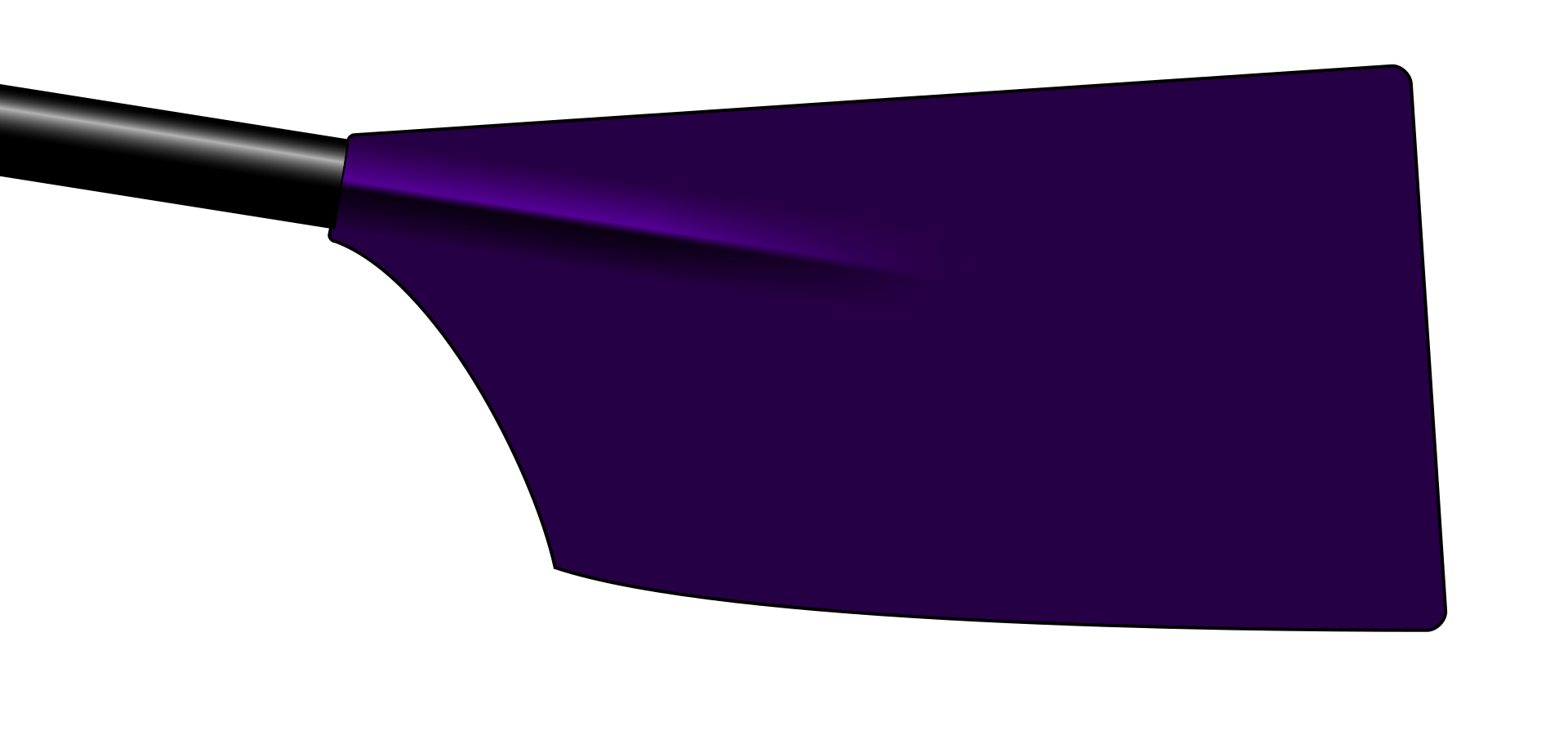
- Haileybury College
- Kardinia International College
- Korowa Anglican Girls' School
- Lauriston Girls' School
- Loreto College, Ballarat
- Loreto Mandeville Hall
- Lowther Hall Anglican Grammar School
- Matthew Flinders Girls Secondary College
- Melbourne Girls College
- Melbourne Girls Grammar School
- Melbourne Grammar School
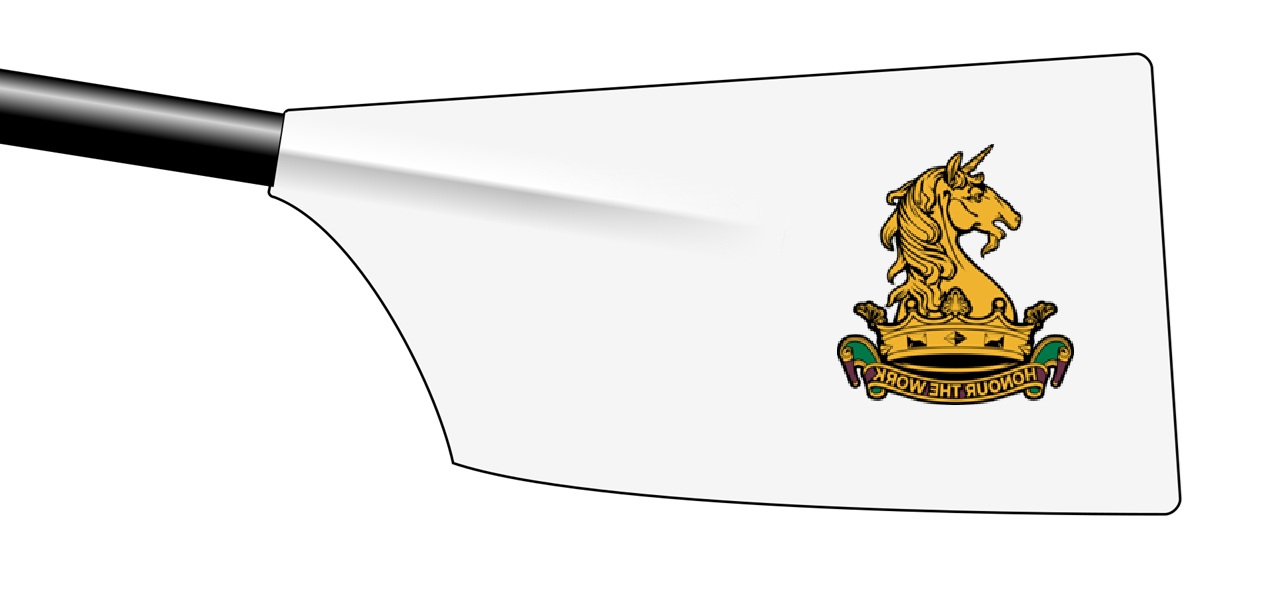
- Melbourne High School
- Methodist Ladies' College
- Presbyterian Ladies' College, Melbourne
- Ruyton Girls' School
- Sacred Heart College, Geelong
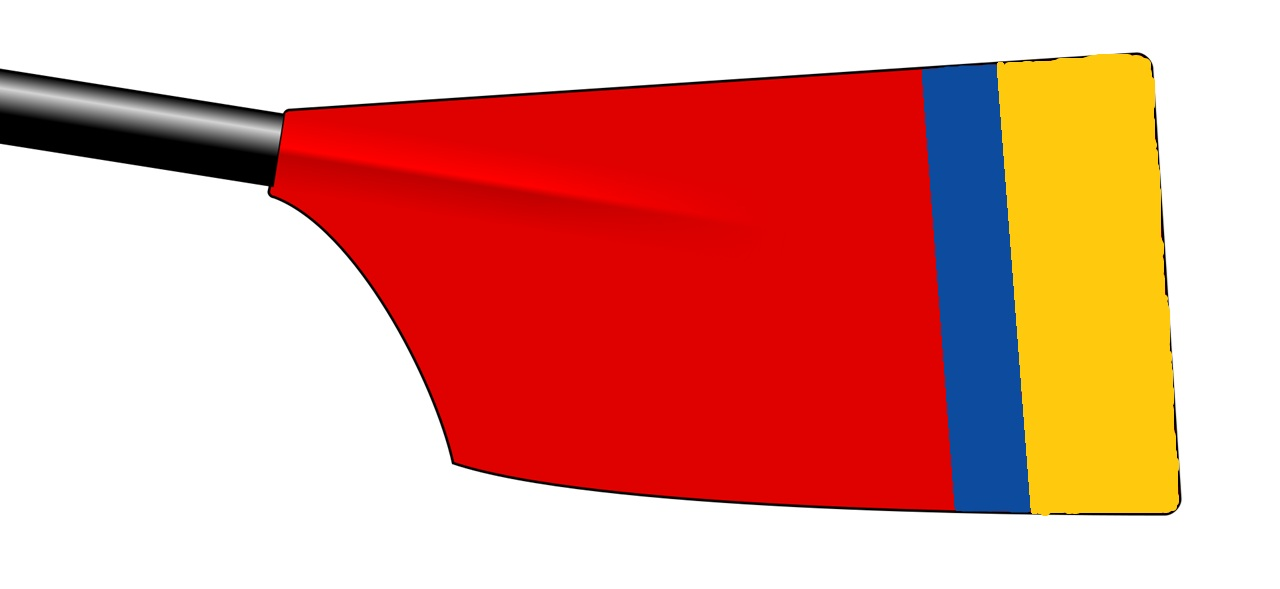
- Scotch College
- St Catherine's School
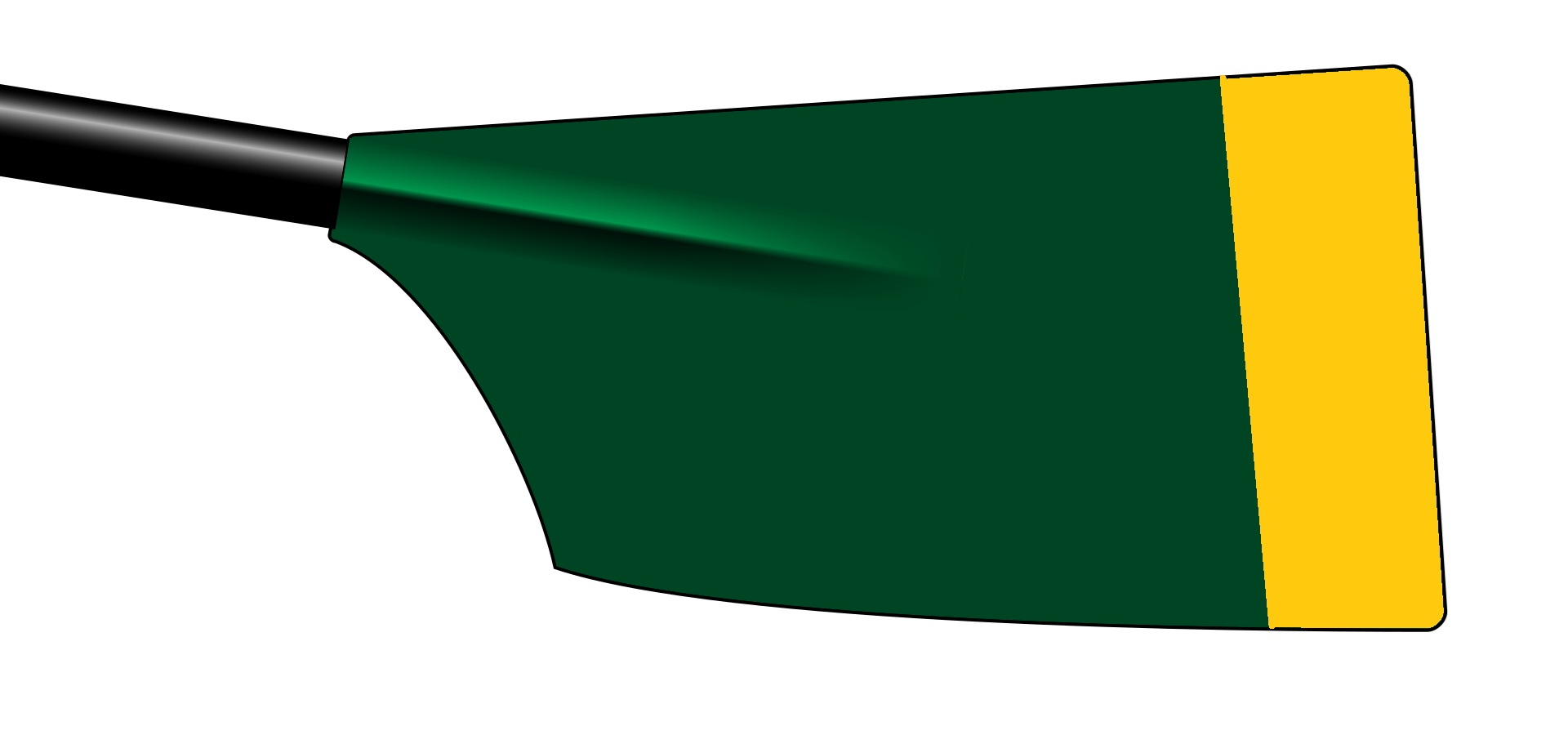
- St Kevin's College
- St Patrick's College
- Shelford Girls' Grammar
- Strathcona Baptist Girls Grammar School
- Hamilton and Alexandra College
- Toorak College
- Warrnambool College
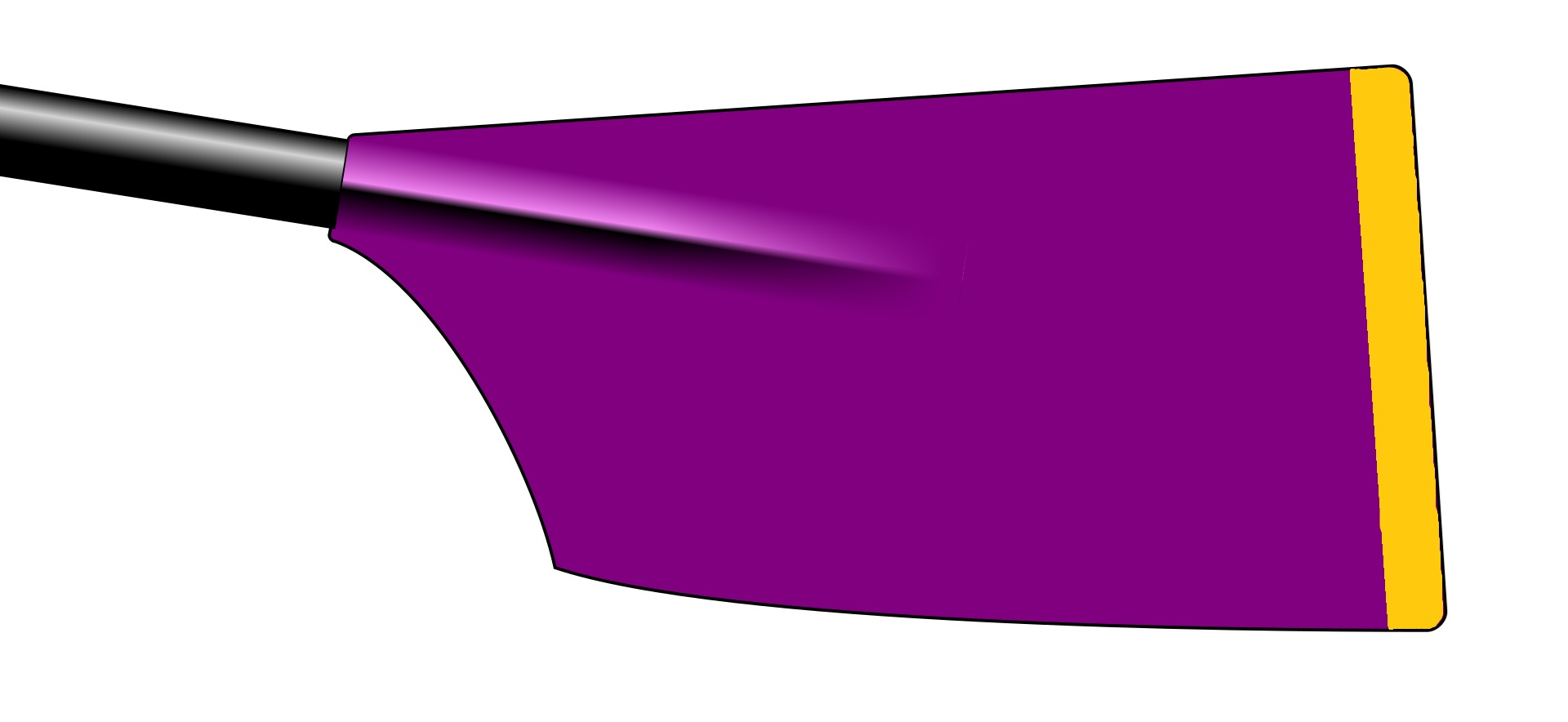
- Wesley College
- Xavier College

== Western Australia ==
Rowing WA

=== Clubs ===
- Albany Rowing Club
- ANA Rowing Club
- Bunbury Rowing Club
- Champion Lakes Boat Club
- Curtin University Boat Club
- Fremantle Rowing Club
- Greenough River Rowing Club
- Perth Rowing Club
- Murdoch University Rowing Club
- Swan River Rowing Club
- West Australian Rowing Club
- University of Western Australia Boat Club

=== Schools ===
- Aquinas College
- Christ Church Grammar School
- Guildford Grammar School
- Hale School
- John XXIII College
- Methodist Ladies College
- Penrhos College
- Perth College
- Presbyterian Ladies' College
- Scotch College
- St Hilda's Anglican School for Girls
- Trinity College, Perth
- Wesley College
- Shenton College, Perth

== See also ==
- List of Australian rules football clubs in Australia
- List of cricket clubs in Australia
- List of baseball teams in Australia
- List of basketball clubs in Australia
- List of rugby league clubs in Australia
- List of rugby union clubs in Australia
- List of soccer clubs in Australia
- List of yacht clubs in Australia
- List of rowing blades
- Rowing Australia
