= List of current NBL team rosters =

Below is a list of current NBL team rosters:

== Current team roster ==
=== Adelaide 36ers ===
Note: Flags indicate national team eligibility at FIBA-sanctioned events. Players may hold other non-FIBA nationalities not displayed.

Adelaide 36ers roster
Players
Coaches

Pos.	No.	Nat.	Name	Ht.	Wt.
G	0	(Australia)	Kenyon, Matt	1.96 m (6 ft 5 in)	91 kg (201 lb)
G	1	(New Zealand)	Cameron, Flynn	1.96 m (6 ft 5 in)	95 kg (209 lb)
G	2	(Australia)	White, Isaac	1.88 m (6 ft 2 in)	85 kg (187 lb)
C	8	(Australia)	Humphries, Isaac	2.11 m (6 ft 11 in)	114 kg (251 lb)
F	10	(South Sudan)	Manyang, Magok (DP)	2.06 m (6 ft 9 in)	91 kg (201 lb)
G	11	(United States)	Cotton, Bryce (I)	1.82 m (6 ft 0 in)	76 kg (168 lb)
C	14	(Australia)	Griscti, Ben	2.11 m (6 ft 11 in)	100 kg (220 lb)
G	17	(Australia)	Harris, Michael	1.93 m (6 ft 4 in)	85 kg (187 lb)
G	22	(New Zealand)	Rasmussen, Keanu	1.88 m (6 ft 2 in)	86 kg (190 lb)
F/C	24	(United States)	Harrell, Montrezl (I)	2.01 m (6 ft 7 in)	109 kg (240 lb)
G	34	(Australia)	Vasiljevic, Dejan (C)	1.90 m (6 ft 3 in)	88 kg (194 lb)
F	39	(South Sudan)	Manyang, Deng (DP)	2.01 m (6 ft 7 in)
F	42	(Australia)	Brogan, Che (DP)	1.98 m (6 ft 6 in)
F	45	(United States)	Cheatham, Zylan (I)	2.03 m (6 ft 8 in)	105 kg (231 lb)
F		(Australia)	Jones, Blake (NRP)	2.08 m (6 ft 10 in)	104 kg (229 lb)

Head coach

- (United States) Mike Wells

Assistant coach(es)

- (Australia) Luke Cann
- (Australia) Igor Cvjetkovic (development)
- (Australia) Jakob Dorricott (development)
- (Serbia) Marko Marinović
- (Australia) Kerry Williams

Strength & conditioning coach(es)

- (Australia) Nik Popovic

Legend

- (C) Team captain
- (DP) Development player
- (IN) Inactive
- (I) Import player
- (NRP) Nominated replacement player
- (NS) Next Star player
- Injured

- Roster
Updated: 9 September 2025

=== Brisbane Bullets ===
Note: Flags indicate national team eligibility at FIBA-sanctioned events. Players may hold other non-FIBA nationalities not displayed.

Brisbane Bullets roster
Players
Coaches

Pos.	No.	Nat.	Name	Ht.	Wt.
G	0	(New Zealand)	Murray, Taine	1.96 m (6 ft 5 in)	93 kg (205 lb)
G	1	(United States)	Freeman-Liberty, Javon (I)	1.91 m (6 ft 3 in)	86 kg (190 lb)
G	2	(United States)	Adams, Jaylen (I)	1.83 m (6 ft 0 in)	84 kg (185 lb)
G	3	(Australia)	Savage, Kye (DP)	1.86 m (6 ft 1 in)
G/F	4	(Australia)	Ducas, Alex	2.01 m (6 ft 7 in)	100 kg (220 lb)
G	6	(Australia)	Devers, Tristan (DP)	1.91 m (6 ft 3 in)
G	8	(Australia)	Norton, Mitch (C)	1.84 m (6 ft 0 in)	90 kg (198 lb)
F	12	(Australia)	Purchase, Jack	2.03 m (6 ft 8 in)	94 kg (207 lb)
F	15	(Canada)	Holt, Jacob	2.08 m (6 ft 10 in)	113 kg (249 lb)
F	18	(New Zealand)	Smith-Milner, Tohi	2.05 m (6 ft 9 in)	117 kg (258 lb)
G/F	23	(United States)	Prather, Casey (I)	1.96 m (6 ft 5 in)	94 kg (207 lb)
C	24	(New Zealand)	Harrison, Tyrell	2.14 m (7 ft 0 in)	115 kg (254 lb)
G	26	(Australia)	McDaniel, Sam	1.98 m (6 ft 6 in)	102 kg (225 lb)
F	50	(Australia)	Bradtke, Jensen (DP)	2.08 m (6 ft 10 in)	100 kg (220 lb)
F		(Australia)	Dalton, Callum (NRP)	2.06 m (6 ft 9 in)	115 kg (254 lb)

Head coach

- (United States) Stu Lash

Assistant coach(es)

- (Australia) Darryl McDonald
- (Australia) Greg Vanderjagt

Legend

- (C) Team captain
- (DP) Development player
- (IN) Inactive
- (I) Import player
- (TP) Training player
- (SRP) Special restricted player
- (NRP) Nominated replacement player
- (NS) Next Star player
- Injured

- Roster
Updated: 9 September 2025

=== Cairns Taipans ===
Note: Flags indicate national team eligibility at FIBA-sanctioned events. Players may hold other non-FIBA nationalities not displayed.

Cairns Taipans roster
Players
Coaches

Pos.	No.	Nat.	Name	Ht.	Wt.
G	0	(United States)	Hagans, Ashton (I)	1.91 m (6 ft 3 in)	86 kg (190 lb)
G	1	(Australia)	McVeigh, Lloyd (DP)	1.98 m (6 ft 6 in)	92 kg (203 lb)
G	2	(Australia)	Smith, Reyne	1.88 m (6 ft 2 in)	86 kg (190 lb)
F	3	(South Sudan)	Mag, Mawot	2.01 m (6 ft 7 in)	97 kg (214 lb)
G	4	(Australia)	Adnam, Kyle	1.86 m (6 ft 1 in)	84 kg (185 lb)
G	5	(United States)	Schofield, Admiral (I)	1.96 m (6 ft 5 in)	109 kg (240 lb)
G	6	(Australia)	Stattmann, Kody	2.02 m (6 ft 8 in)	91 kg (201 lb)
F	9	(Australia)	McVeigh, Jack	2.03 m (6 ft 8 in)	98 kg (216 lb)
C	10	(Australia)	Richardson, Jed (DP)
F	11	(Australia)	Higgins-Titsha, Alex	2.02 m (6 ft 8 in)	81 kg (179 lb)
F	14	(Australia)	Galloway, Kyrin	2.03 m (6 ft 8 in)	98 kg (216 lb)
F	21	(New Zealand)	Waardenburg, Sam (C)	2.08 m (6 ft 10 in)	100 kg (220 lb)
C	24	(United States)	Lee, Marcus (I)	2.11 m (6 ft 11 in)	99 kg (218 lb)

Head coach

- (Australia) Adam Forde

Assistant coach(es)

- (Australia) Angus Henskens
- (Australia) Michael Lake
- (Australia) Will Lopez

Legend

- (C) Team captain
- (DP) Development player
- (IN) Inactive
- (I) Import player
- (TP) Training player
- (SRP) Special restricted player
- (NS) Next Star player
- Injured

- Roster
Updated: 28 August 2025

=== Illawarra Hawks ===
Note: Flags indicate national team eligibility at FIBA-sanctioned events. Players may hold other non-FIBA nationalities not displayed.

Illawarra Hawks roster
Players
Coaches

Pos.	No.	Nat.	Name	Ht.	Wt.
C	0	(United States)	McGee, JaVale (I)	2.13 m (7 ft 0 in)	122 kg (269 lb)
G	1	(United States)	Harvey, Tyler (I & C)	1.93 m (6 ft 4 in)	84 kg (185 lb)
G	2	(New Zealand)	Ball, Jackson (DP)	1.91 m (6 ft 3 in)
G	6	(Australia)	Hickey, William	1.94 m (6 ft 4 in)	92 kg (203 lb)
G/F	9	(Australia)	Swaka Lo Buluk, Wani	1.98 m (6 ft 6 in)	88 kg (194 lb)
G	10	(Australia)	McDowell-White, Kobe (DP)	1.83 m (6 ft 0 in)
G/F	11	(Australia)	Grida, Daniel	1.97 m (6 ft 6 in)	93 kg (205 lb)
F/C	13	(Australia)	Froling, Sam (injured) (C)	2.13 m (7 ft 0 in)	109 kg (240 lb)
G	16	(Australia)	Narkle, Johny (DP)	1.99 m (6 ft 6 in)	79 kg (174 lb)
F/C	19	(Australia)	Yates, Luca (DP)	2.08 m (6 ft 10 in)	102 kg (225 lb)
F	21	(Australia)	Blanchfield, Todd	1.98 m (6 ft 6 in)	98 kg (216 lb)
F	22	(Australia)	Peatling, Mason	2.03 m (6 ft 8 in)	105 kg (231 lb)
F/C	30	(Australia)	Olbrich, Lachlan	2.08 m (6 ft 10 in)	107 kg (236 lb)
C	31	(Australia)	Froling, Harry (IRP)	2.10 m (6 ft 11 in)	123 kg (271 lb)
F	43	(Australia)	Bolden, Jonah	2.03 m (6 ft 8 in)	106 kg (234 lb)
G	55	(United States)	McLaughlin, JaQuori (I)	1.93 m (6 ft 4 in)	86 kg (190 lb)

Head coach

- (United States) Justin Tatum

Assistant coach(es)

- (Australia) Tom Cranney
- (Australia) Matt Flinn
- (Australia) Sam Gruggen
- (Australia) Joel Khalu

Strength & conditioning coach(es)

- (Australia) Alex Moore

Legend

- (C) Team captain
- (DP) Development player
- (I) Import player
- (TP) Training player
- (IRP) Injury replacement player
- (NS) Next Star player
- Injured

- Roster
Updated: 9 September 2025

=== Melbourne United ===
Note: Flags indicate national team eligibility at FIBA-sanctioned events. Players may hold other non-FIBA nationalities not displayed.

Melbourne United roster
Players
Coaches

Pos.	No.	Nat.	Name	Ht.	Wt.
G	2	(United States)	Walker, Tyson (I)	1.85 m (6 ft 1 in)	84 kg (185 lb)
G	3	(Australia)	Blogg, Campbell (DP)	1.94 m (6 ft 4 in)	88 kg (194 lb)
G	4	(Australia)	Daniels, Dash (NS)	1.96 m (6 ft 5 in)
F	7	(New Zealand)	Delany, Finn	2.00 m (6 ft 7 in)	106 kg (234 lb)
F	9	(South Sudan)	Machar, Malith	2.03 m (6 ft 8 in)	85 kg (187 lb)
G	12	(Australia)	Wilson, Tom	1.94 m (6 ft 4 in)	77 kg (170 lb)
G	13	(Australia)	Krebs, Tanner	1.98 m (6 ft 6 in)	95 kg (209 lb)
C	14	(Netherlands)	Edwards, Jesse (I)	2.13 m (7 ft 0 in)	107 kg (236 lb)
F	15	(Australia)	Bowen, Kyle	2.04 m (6 ft 8 in)	101 kg (223 lb)
F	20	(Australia)	Krslovic, Fabijan	2.03 m (6 ft 8 in)	106 kg (234 lb)
C	22	(Australia)	Tata, Nicolas (NRP)	2.08 m (6 ft 10 in)
F	30	(Australia)	Koppens, Tom (DP)	2.01 m (6 ft 7 in)
G	35	(United States)	Doyle, Milton (I)	1.93 m (6 ft 4 in)	86 kg (190 lb)
G	43	(Australia)	Goulding, Chris (C)	1.92 m (6 ft 4 in)	92 kg (203 lb)
G	51	(New Zealand)	Ili, Shea	1.84 m (6 ft 0 in)	88 kg (194 lb)

Head coach

- (Australia) Dean Vickerman

Assistant coach(es)

- (Australia) David Barlow
- (Australia) Rhys Carter
- (Australia) Jack Fleming

Team manager

- (Australia) Stephan Semerci

Legend

- (C) Team captain
- (DP) Development player
- (IN) Inactive
- (I) Import player
- (TP) Training player
- (NRP) Nominated replacement player
- (NS) Next Star player
- Injured

- Roster
Updated: 9 September 2025

=== New Zealand Breakers ===
Note: Flags indicate national team eligibility at FIBA-sanctioned events. Players may hold other non-FIBA nationalities not displayed.

New Zealand Breakers roster
Players
Coaches

Pos.	No.	Nat.	Name	Ht.	Wt.
G	0	(New Zealand)	McNaught, Alex (DP)	1.83 m (6 ft 0 in)	90 kg (198 lb)
G/F	1	(Mexico)	López, Karim (NS)	2.02 m (6 ft 8 in)
G/F	2	(Australia)	Bairstow, Sean	2.03 m (6 ft 8 in)	93 kg (205 lb)
F/C	3	(New Zealand)	Mennenga, Sam	2.06 m (6 ft 9 in)	109 kg (240 lb)
G	4	(New Zealand)	Le'afa, Izayah	1.88 m (6 ft 2 in)	90 kg (198 lb)
G	5	(New Zealand)	Britt, Taylor	1.87 m (6 ft 2 in)	77 kg (170 lb)
G	6	(United States)	Jackson-Cartwright, Parker (I)	1.80 m (5 ft 11 in)	74 kg (163 lb)
G/F	7	(New Zealand)	Te Rangi, Reuben	1.98 m (6 ft 6 in)	105 kg (231 lb)
G	8	(United States)	Brockington, Izaiah (I)	1.93 m (6 ft 4 in)	89 kg (196 lb)
F/C	9	(United States)	Baker, Robert (I)	2.08 m (6 ft 10 in)	95 kg (209 lb)
F	12	(New Zealand)	Darling, Max	1.98 m (6 ft 6 in)	118 kg (260 lb)
F/C	15	(New Zealand)	Loe, Robert	2.11 m (6 ft 11 in)	115 kg (254 lb)
F	21	(New Zealand)	Davison, Carlin	1.96 m (6 ft 5 in)	95 kg (209 lb)
G	34	(New Zealand)	Cooper, Tukaha (DP)	1.90 m (6 ft 3 in)
F	67	(New Zealand)	Judd, Liam (DP)	1.96 m (6 ft 5 in)

Head coach

- (Finland) Petteri Koponen

Assistant coach(es)

- (Croatia) Mario Dugandzic
- (Lithuania) Laimonas Eglinskas
- (New Zealand) Matt Lacey
- (United States) Daniel Sokolovsky

Strength & conditioning coach(es)

- (United States) Shane Connolly

Legend

- (C) Team captain
- (DP) Development player
- (I) Import player
- (SRP) Special restricted player
- (NS) Next Star player
- Injured

- Roster
Updated: 30 August 2025

=== Perth Wildcats ===
Note: Flags indicate national team eligibility at FIBA-sanctioned events. Players may hold other non-FIBA nationalities not displayed.

Perth Wildcats roster
Players
Coaches

Pos.	No.	Nat.	Name	Ht.	Wt.
C	0	(South Sudan)	Lual-Acuil, Jo	2.13 m (7 ft 0 in)	102 kg (225 lb)
G	1	(New Zealand)	Russo-Nance, Dontae	1.90 m (6 ft 3 in)	90 kg (198 lb)
F	2	(South Sudan)	Mayen, Lat	2.06 m (6 ft 9 in)	92 kg (203 lb)
G/F	3	(United States)	Windler, Dylan (I)	2.01 m (6 ft 7 in)	89 kg (196 lb)
F	5	(United States)	Doolittle, Kristian (I)	2.01 m (6 ft 7 in)	105 kg (231 lb)
G	8	(South Sudan)	Dech, Sunday	1.95 m (6 ft 5 in)	92 kg (203 lb)
G	9	(Australia)	Rillie, Jaron (DP)	1.91 m (6 ft 3 in)	84 kg (185 lb)
G/F	10	(Australia)	Henshall, Ben	1.95 m (6 ft 5 in)	90 kg (198 lb)
G	13	(France)	Kouakou-Heugue, Noa (NS)	2.04 m (6 ft 8 in)	93 kg (205 lb)
F	22	(Australia)	Gerovich, Thomas (DP)	2.00 m (6 ft 7 in)
F	24	(Australia)	Wagstaff, Jesse (C)	2.03 m (6 ft 8 in)	103 kg (227 lb)
F	25	(Australia)	Huefner, Cameron (DP)	2.03 m (6 ft 8 in)	105 kg (231 lb)
F	35	(Australia)	Okwera, David	2.08 m (6 ft 10 in)	90 kg (198 lb)
G	40	(Australia)	Pepper, Elijah	1.93 m (6 ft 4 in)	91 kg (201 lb)
G		(United States)	Jones, Mason (I)	1.93 m (6 ft 4 in)	91 kg (201 lb)

Head coach

- (Australia) John Rillie

Assistant coach(es)

- (Australia) Keegan Crawford
- (United States) Ben Peterson
- (New Zealand) Aaron Young

Strength & conditioning coach(es)

- (Australia) Josh Cavanagh

Legend

- (C) Team captain
- (DP) Development player
- (I) Import player
- (SRP) Special restricted player
- (NS) Next Star player
- Injured

- Roster
Updated: 8 September 2025

=== South East Melbourne Phoenix ===
Note: Flags indicate national team eligibility at FIBA-sanctioned events. Players may hold other non-FIBA nationalities not displayed.

S.E. Melbourne Phoenix roster
Players
Coaches

Pos.	No.	Nat.	Name	Ht.	Wt.
C	1	(Australia)	Hunter, Jordan (C)	2.09 m (6 ft 10 in)	109 kg (240 lb)
F	4	(Australia)	Biggar, Ellis (DP)	2.08 m (6 ft 10 in)
G	5	(Australia)	Glover, Angus	1.94 m (6 ft 4 in)	90 kg (198 lb)
F	6	(Belgium)	Bleijenbergh, Vrenz (I)	2.08 m (6 ft 10 in)	95 kg (209 lb)
F	7	(Australia)	Aliir, Akech	2.04 m (6 ft 8 in)	102 kg (225 lb)
F	8	(Australia)	Mitchell, D. J.	2.03 m (6 ft 8 in)	106 kg (234 lb)
G	11	(Australia)	Foster, Daniel (DP)	1.98 m (6 ft 6 in)	98 kg (216 lb)
C	12	(Australia)	Gak, Gorjok	2.11 m (6 ft 11 in)	102 kg (225 lb)
G	20	(Australia)	Sobey, Nathan (C)	1.90 m (6 ft 3 in)	82 kg (181 lb)
G	24	(United States)	Maldonado, Hunter (I)	1.98 m (6 ft 6 in)	92 kg (203 lb)
G	30	(Australia)	Foxwell, Owen	1.88 m (6 ft 2 in)	81 kg (179 lb)
F	33	(Trinidad and Tobago)	Lewis, Malique (NS)	2.03 m (6 ft 8 in)	88 kg (194 lb)
F		(United States)	Brown, John (I)	2.03 m (6 ft 8 in)	98 kg (216 lb)

Head coach

- (United States) Josh King

Assistant coach(es)

- (Australia) Luke Brennan
- (Australia) Adam Gibson
- (United States) Dan Ryan

Legend

- (C) Team captain
- (DP) Development player
- (IN) Inactive
- (I) Import player
- (SRP) Special restricted player
- (NS) Next Star player
- Injured

- Roster
Updated: 30 August 2025

=== Sydney Kings ===
Note: Flags indicate national team eligibility at FIBA-sanctioned events. Players may hold other non-FIBA nationalities not displayed.

Sydney Kings roster
Players
Coaches

Pos.	No.	Nat.	Name	Ht.	Wt.
G	1	(United States)	Davis, Kendric (I)	1.80 m (5 ft 11 in)	82 kg (181 lb)
G/F	3	(Australia)	Robertson, Tyler	1.98 m (6 ft 6 in)	107 kg (236 lb)
F	6	(Australia)	Galloway, Jaylin	1.97 m (6 ft 6 in)	92 kg (203 lb)
G	7	(Australia)	Bruce, Shaun	1.92 m (6 ft 4 in)	87 kg (192 lb)
G	8	(Australia)	Dellavedova, Matthew (C)	1.93 m (6 ft 4 in)	91 kg (201 lb)
F	10	(Australia)	Cooks, Xavier	2.03 m (6 ft 8 in)	83 kg (183 lb)
C	11	(Brazil)	Soares, Tim (I)	2.11 m (6 ft 11 in)	107 kg (236 lb)
F	12	(South Sudan)	Noi, Kouat	2.01 m (6 ft 7 in)	103 kg (227 lb)
C	14	(Australia)	Spurgin, Jason (DP)	2.13 m (7 ft 0 in)	113 kg (249 lb)
F	15	(South Sudan)	Maluach, Makuach	1.96 m (6 ft 5 in)	89 kg (196 lb)
F	34	(Australia)	Leaupepe, Keli (injured)	1.98 m (6 ft 6 in)	109 kg (240 lb)
F	42	(South Sudan)	Kuol, Bul	2.01 m (6 ft 7 in)	94 kg (207 lb)
G		(Australia)	Awan, Lueth (DP)	2.01 m (6 ft 7 in)
F		(Australia)	Malual, Goc (DP)	1.96 m (6 ft 5 in)

Head coach

- (Australia) Brian Goorjian

Assistant coach(es)

- (Australia) Andrew Bogut

Legend

- (C) Team captain
- (DP) Development player
- (IN) Inactive
- (I) Import player
- (SRP) Special restricted player
- (NS) Next Star player
- Injured

- Roster
Updated: 2 September 2025

=== Tasmania JackJumpers ===
Note: Flags indicate national team eligibility at FIBA-sanctioned events. Players may hold other non-FIBA nationalities not displayed.

Tasmania JackJumpers roster
Players
Coaches

Pos.	No.	Nat.	Name	Ht.	Wt.
G	0	(United States)	Hamilton, Bryce (I)	1.93 m (6 ft 4 in)	93 kg (205 lb)
G	2	(Australia)	Nunn, Brody (DP)	1.85 m (6 ft 1 in)
G/F	3	(Australia)	Drmic, Anthony (VC)	1.98 m (6 ft 6 in)	91 kg (201 lb)
G	4	(Australia)	Stoddart, Nicholas	1.88 m (6 ft 2 in)
F	5	(South Sudan)	Deng, Majok	2.05 m (6 ft 9 in)	84 kg (185 lb)
G	7	(United States)	Johnson, David (I)	1.93 m (6 ft 4 in)	92 kg (203 lb)
G	10	(Australia)	Ayre, Ben	1.84 m (6 ft 0 in)	80 kg (176 lb)
F	11	(Australia)	Marshall, Nick	1.98 m (6 ft 6 in)	88 kg (194 lb)
G	12	(United States)	Campbell, Tyger (I & IRP)	1.80 m (5 ft 11 in)	82 kg (181 lb)
G	13	(Australia)	Macdonald, Sean (injured)	1.88 m (6 ft 2 in)	86 kg (190 lb)
F	15	(Australia)	Woodhill, Archie (DP)	2.06 m (6 ft 9 in)	102 kg (225 lb)
C	22	(Australia)	Magnay, Will (C)	2.08 m (6 ft 10 in)	111 kg (245 lb)
F	33	(Australia)	Bannan, Josh	2.08 m (6 ft 10 in)	100 kg (220 lb)
F	96	(Australia)	Williamson, Kobe	2.03 m (6 ft 8 in)	111 kg (245 lb)

Head coach

- (United States) Scott Roth

Assistant coach(es)

- (Australia) Nathan Brereton
- (Australia) Mark Radford
- (Australia) Jarrad Weeks

Team manager

- (Australia) Mark Chivers

Legend

- (C) Team captain
- (DP) Development player
- (IN) Inactive
- (I) Import player
- (TP) Training player
- (SRP) Special restricted player
- (IRP) Injury replacement player
- (NS) Next Star player
- Injured

- Roster
Updated: 9 September 2025

== See also ==
- List of current WNBL team rosters
- List of NBL1 clubs
- List of basketball clubs in Australia
- List of current New Zealand NBL team rosters
