= Taihape Area School =

Location
- 26 Huia St, Taihape, New Zealand; 39.675764°S 175.8008974°E

Information
- Type: State composite coeducational
- Established: 2009
- Ministry of Education Institution no.: 549
- Principal: Richard McMillan
- Enrolment: 254 (July 2026)
- Socio-economic decile: 4 (July 2026)
- Website: www.tas.school.nz

Taihape Area School is a state composite coeducational school located in Taihape, Manawatū-Whanganui, New Zealand. It is located on 26 Huia St.

The school has a roll of 244 students as of August 2017 and provides education for students in years 1–13.

== History ==
Taihape Area School was formed in 2009 after Taihape's primary and secondary schools amalgamated. It was officially opened in October 2009 by former Minister of Education Trevor Mallard and local Rangitikei MP Simon Power. The reason for the amalgamation between the two schools was budget-based because of a decline in student numbers.

Between its establishment in 2009 and 2010 the principal was Boyce Davey and since 2010 it is Richard McMillan.

== Enrolment ==
As of July 2026, Taihape Area School has a roll of 254 students, of which 177 (69.7%) identify as Māori.

As of 2026, the school has an Equity Index of 514, placing it amongst schools whose students have many socioeconomic barriers to achievement (roughly equivalent to deciles 2 and 3 under the former socio-economic decile system).

== Facilities ==
The school was described by former principal Davey as "one of the most technologically advanced schools built in New Zealand". All 29 of its learning spaces are provided with large interactive touch sensitive whiteboards linked to computer systems.

In August 2024, it was revealed that some schools around the country were earthquake prone. On 15 August 2024, it was reported that the school's main teaching block and gym have a 15 percent seismic rating and that the buildings have been leaking since they opened. This was reported a day after Wellington Girls' College students protested outside Parliament after a teaching block in their school was closed due to having a 15 percent seismic rating. The Ministry of Education plans for Taihape Area School include demolishing and rebuilding the main teaching block and strengthening the gym sometime in 2025.

== Notable alumni ==
- James Paringatai, basketball player
- Cecily Pickerill, plastic surgeon

== See also ==
- List of schools in Manawatū-Whanganui
