= Lincoln North Star High School =

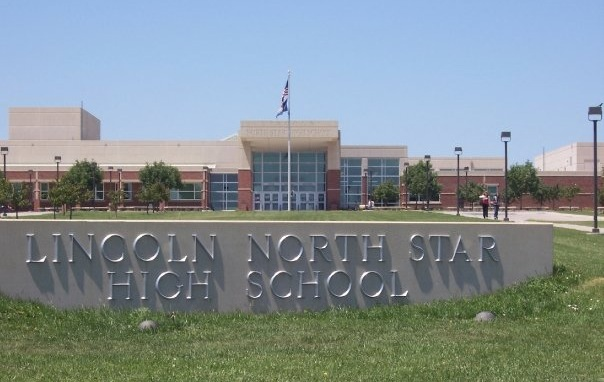

Location
- 5801 North 33rd Street; Lincoln, Nebraska 68504; United States; 40°52′10″N 96°40′34″W

Information
- School type: High school
- Motto: "Charting our Course, Navigating the Journey, Celebrating Success"
- Established: 2003
- School district: Lincoln Public Schools
- Principal: Megan Kroll
- Teaching staff: 119.55 (on an FTE basis)
- Enrollment: 1,927 (2024–2025)
- Student to teacher ratio: 16.12
- Colors: Navy and cardinal
- Mascot: Navigators
- Team name: Gators
- Website: Lincoln North Star H.S.

Lincoln North Star High School (LNS or North Star) is a public secondary school located in Lincoln, Nebraska, United States. It opened its doors in 2003 to 1,150 students, and as of the 2024–2025 school year, has approximately 2,000 students.

North Star operates on a traditional seven-period day schedule, sometimes with eight periods for those who choose it. The school features a system of academies to assist students with post-secondary planning. The means to implement the academies were provided through federal and local grants. Students may participate in the Science and Engineering Academy, Business and Information Technology Academy, Law and Global Affairs Academy, Health and Biotechnology Academy, and Arts and Communications Academy. North Star was the first Lincoln high school to use this innovative system, which has since been expanded to the other five Lincoln public high schools in the form of Professional Learning Communities. Over 36 different home languages with students from 37 different birth countries attend Lincoln North Star.

North Star was originally supposed to be named Lincoln Northwest; at the time, every high school in Lincoln Public Schools was named after a direction depending on their respective location, with the exception of Lincoln High. Before the school opened, the students voted on the name North Star.

The school's colors are navy blue and burgundy/maroon. Although the official mascot is the North Star Navigator, its mascot is an alligator, nicknamed "Navi Gator".

From its founding in 2003 until 2006, North Star hosted a middle school, North Star Middle School, in a separate wing.

== Traditions ==
North Star has many traditions which have started during its short existence. One of these is the Gator Walk to state, in which the North Star Drumline marches through the school playing cadences while followed by students who have qualified for state events to send them off to their state events. There is also a Gator Walk for all freshmen at the end of the first day of school, as well as a final Gator Walk for graduating seniors, days before graduation. Qualifying state members also receive a "North Star State Qualifier" shirt. North Star is also known for having lunch jams once a quarter, in which certain groups such as the jazz band perform during lunch to entertain the students.

The Telescope is the high school newspaper.

The cafeteria is nicknamed as the Bayou and the main gym is called the Swamp, following the theme of the alligator mascot.

== Notable alumni ==
- Ether Saure - singer and contestant on ABC/Disney's High School Musical- Get in The Picture
- Josiah Allick – professional basketball player
- Luke Reimer — college football player for the Nebraska Cornhuskers
- Samantha Marie Ware - Actress, known for her roles on Glee and What/If
