= List of NBL1 clubs =

NBL1 is a semi-professional basketball league in Australia, comprising South, North, Central and West Conferences with both men's and women's competitions.

== Current clubs ==
Club	City	State	Conference	Arena	Joined NBL1 in	NBL1 Championships	Most recent
Albury Wodonga Bandits*	Albury	New South Wales	NBL1 South	Lauren Jackson Sports Centre	2019	0	N/A
Ballarat Rush* (Women); Ballarat Miners* (Men)	Ballarat	(Victoria (state)) Victoria	NBL1 South	Ballarat Minerdome	2019	0	N/A
Bendigo Braves*	Bendigo	(Victoria (state)) Victoria	NBL1 South	Bendigo Stadium	2019	0	N/A
Brisbane Capitals**	Brisbane	Queensland	NBL1 North	Auchenflower Stadium	2020	0	N/A
Cairns Dolphins** (Women); Cairns Marlins** (Men)	Cairns	Queensland	NBL1 North	Cairns Basketball Stadium	2020	0	N/A
Central Districts Lions***	Adelaide	South Australia	NBL1 Central	STARplex	2020	0	N/A
Cockburn Cougars*****	Perth	Western Australia	NBL1 West	Wally Hagan Stadium	2021	0	N/A
Dandenong Rangers*	Melbourne	(Victoria (state)) Victoria	NBL1 South	Dandenong Stadium	2019	0	N/A
Darwin Salties	Darwin	Northern Territory	NBL1 North	Darwin Basketball Stadium	2022	0	N/A
Diamond Valley Eagles*	Melbourne	(Victoria (state)) Victoria	NBL1 South	Diamond Valley Sports and Fitness Centre	2019	0	N/A
East Perth Eagles*****	Perth	Western Australia	NBL1 West	Herb Graham Recreation Centre	2021	0	N/A
Eastern Mavericks***	Mount Barker	South Australia	NBL1 Central	St Francis de Sales Community Sports Centre	2020	0	N/A
Eltham Wildcats****	Melbourne	(Victoria (state)) Victoria	NBL1 South	Eltham High School	2019	0	N/A
Forestville Eagles***	Adelaide	South Australia	NBL1 Central	Wayville Sports Centre	2020	2	2026
Frankston Blues*	Melbourne	(Victoria (state)) Victoria	NBL1 South	Frankston Stadium	2019	1	2026
Geelong Supercats*	Geelong	(Victoria (state)) Victoria	NBL1 South	Geelong Arena	2019	0	N/A
Geraldton Buccaneers***** (Men)	Geraldton	Western Australia	NBL1 West	Activewest Stadium	2021	0	N/A
Gold Coast Rollers**	Gold Coast	Queensland	NBL1 North	Carrara Indoor Stadium	2020	1	2026
Goldfields Giants*****	Kalgoorlie	Western Australia	NBL1 West	Niels Hansen Basketball Stadium	2021	0	N/A
Hobart Chargers	Hobart	Tasmania	NBL1 South	Derwent Entertainment Centre	2020	0	N/A
Ipswich Force**	Ipswich	Queensland	NBL1 North	Llewellyn Stadium	2020	0	N/A
Joondalup Wolves*****	Joondalup	Western Australia	NBL1 West	Arena Joondalup	2021	0	N/A
Kalamunda Eastern Suns*****	Perth	Western Australia	NBL1 West	Ray Owen Sports Centre	2021	0	N/A
Kilsyth Cobras*	Melbourne	(Victoria (state)) Victoria	NBL1 South	Kilsyth Sports Centre	2019	1	2019; 7 years ago
Knox Raiders**** Women	Melbourne	(Victoria (state)) Victoria	NBL1 South	State Basketball Centre	2019	1	2026
Lakeside Lightning*****	Perth	Western Australia	NBL1 West	Lakeside Recreation Centre	2021	0	N/A
Launceston Tornadoes* (Women)	Launceston	Tasmania	NBL1 South	Elphin Sports Centre	2019	0	N/A
Logan Thunder**	Logan	Queensland	NBL1 North	Cornubia Park Sports Stadium	2020	0	N/A
Mackay Meteorettes** (Women); Mackay Meteors** (Men)	Mackay	Queensland	NBL1 North	McDonald's Mackay Stadium	2020	0	N/A
Mandurah Magic*****	Mandurah	Western Australia	NBL1 West	Mandurah Aquatic & Recreation Centre	2021	0	N/A
Melbourne Tigers*	Melbourne	(Victoria (state)) Victoria	NBL1 South	Melbourne Sports & Aquatic Centre	2019	0	N/A
Mount Gambier Pioneers***	Mount Gambier	South Australia	NBL1 South	Bern Bruning Stadium	2020	0	N/A
North Adelaide Rockets***	Adelaide	South Australia	NBL1 Central	The Lights Community and Sports Centre	2020	0	N/A
Northside Wizards	Brisbane	Queensland	NBL1 North	Northside Indoor Sports Centre	2021	0	N/A
North-West Tasmania Thunder* (Men)	Ulverstone	Tasmania	NBL1 South	Ulverstone Sports and Leisure Centre	2019	0	N/A
Norwood Flames***	Adelaide	South Australia	NBL1 Central	The ARC	2020	0	N/A
Nunawading Spectres*	Melbourne	(Victoria (state)) Victoria	NBL1 South	Nunawading Basketball Centre	2019	1	2019; 7 years ago
Perry Lakes Hawks*****	Perth	Western Australia	NBL1 West	WA Basketball Centre	2021	0	N/A
Perth Redbacks*****	Perth	Western Australia	NBL1 West	Belmont Oasis Leisure Centre	2021	0	N/A
RedCity Roar	Brisbane	Queensland	NBL1 North	Paul Bancroft Centre	2021	0	N/A
Ringwood Hawks****	Melbourne	(Victoria (state)) Victoria	NBL1 South	The Rings	2019	0	N/A
Rockhampton Cyclones** (Women); Rockhampton Rockets** (Men)	Rockhampton	Queensland	NBL1 North	Adani Arena Rockhampton	2020	0	N/A
Rockingham Flames*****	Perth	Western Australia	NBL1 West	Mike Barnett Sports Complex	2021	0	N/A
Sandringham Sabres*	Melbourne	(Victoria (state)) Victoria	NBL1 South	Nunn Media Basketball Centre	2019	0	N/A
South Adelaide Panthers***	Adelaide	South Australia	NBL1 Central	Marion Basketball Centre	2020	0	N/A
South West Slammers*****	Bunbury	Western Australia	NBL1 West	Eaton Recreation Centre	2021	0	N/A
Southern Districts Spartans**	Brisbane	Queensland	NBL1 North	Rowland Cowan Stadium	2020	0	N/A
Southern Tigers***	Adelaide	South Australia	NBL1 Central	Morphett Vale Stadium	2020	0	N/A
South West Metro Pirates**	Brisbane	Queensland	NBL1 North	Hibiscus Stadium	2020	0	N/A
Sturt Sabres*** Women	Adelaide	South Australia	NBL1 Central	Springbank Sports Centre	2020	1	2026
Sunshine Coast Phoenix**	Sunshine Coast	Queensland	NBL1 North	Maroochydore Stadium	2020	0	N/A
Townsville Flames** (Women); Townsville Heat** (Men)	Townsville	Queensland	NBL1 North	Townsville Stadium	2020	0	N/A
USC Rip City**	Sunshine Coast	Queensland	NBL1 North	USC Sports Stadium	2020	0	N/A
Warwick Senators*****	Perth	Western Australia	NBL1 West	Warwick Stadium	2021	0	N/A
Waverley Falcons****	Melbourne	(Victoria (state)) Victoria	NBL1 South	Waverley Basketball Centre	2019	0	N/A
West Adelaide Bearcats***	Adelaide	South Australia	NBL1 Central	Port Adelaide Recreation Centre	2020	0	N/A
Willetton Tigers*****	Perth	Western Australia	NBL1 West	Willetton Basketball Stadium	2021	0	N/A
Woodville Warriors***	Adelaide	South Australia	NBL1 Central	St Clair Recreation Centre	2020	1	N/A

* Teams that transferred from the South East Australian Basketball League (SEABL).

** Teams that transferred from the Queensland Basketball League (QBL).

*** Teams that transferred from the Premier League (South Australia).

**** Teams that transferred from the Big V (Victoria).

***** Teams that transferred from the State Basketball League (SBL).

== Former and defunct clubs ==
Club	City	State	Conference	Arena	Year joined NBL1	Year left NBL1	NBL1 Championships	Most recent
BA Centre of Excellence	Canberra	Australian Capital Territory	N/A	Australian Institute of Sport	2019	2019	0	N/A
Hobart Huskies	Hobart	Tasmania	N/A	Derwent Entertainment Centre Silverdome	2019	2019	0	N/A

== See also ==
- List of basketball clubs in Australia
- List of current NBL team rosters
- List of current WNBL team rosters
