= Martin Iti =

New Zealand-Australian basketball player

Personal information
- Born: 28 February 1983 (age 43) Sydney, New South Wales
- Listed height: 210 cm (6 ft 11 in)
- Listed weight: 110 kg (243 lb)

Career information
- High school: Winchendon Prep (Winchendon, Massachusetts); Mount Zion Christian Academy (Durham, North Carolina)
- College: Charlotte (2003–2005); New Mexico State (2006–2008)
- NBA draft: 2008: undrafted
- Playing career: 2008–2015
- Position: Center

Career history
- 2008–2009: Rotterdam Challengers
- 2010–2011: Southland Sharks
- 2011–2012: Sydney Kings
- 2012: Wellington Saints
- 2013–2014: Ipswich Force
- 2015: Brisbane Spartans

Career highlights
- NZNBL Rookie of the Year (2010)

Martin Asapa Iti (born 28 February 1983) is a New Zealand-Australian professional basketball player who last played for the Brisbane Spartans of the South East Australian Basketball League (SEABL). As a high school senior at Mount Zion Christian Academy, Iti was rated as the No. 8 high school recruit in the nation and the No. 1 high school centre in the country. He played college basketball for the University of North Carolina at Charlotte and New Mexico State University.

== Professional career ==
In September 2008, Iti signed with the Rotterdam Challengers of the Netherlands for the 2008–09 season. In 32 games for Rotterdam, he averaged 6.7 points, 4.7 rebounds and 1.0 blocks per game.

In February 2010, Iti signed with the Southland Sharks for the 2010 New Zealand NBL season. He went on to earn league Rookie of the Year honours. In December 2010, he re-signed with the Sharks for the 2011 season.

In August 2011, Iti signed with the Sydney Kings for the 2011–12 NBL season. In 16 games for the Kings, he averaged 0.6 points and 0.8 rebounds per game.

In December 2011, Iti signed with the Wellington Saints for the 2012 New Zealand NBL season.

In February 2013, Iti signed with the Ipswich Force for the 2013 Queensland Basketball League season. He returned to the Force for the 2014 season.

In March 2015, Iti signed with the Brisbane Spartans for the 2015 SEABL season. In 17 games for the Spartans, he averaged 4.2 points and 5.5 rebounds per game.
