= Daniel Munday =

Australian basketball player

Personal information
- Born: 7 March 1985 (age 40); Karratha, Western Australia, Australia
- Listed height: 191 cm (6 ft 3 in)
- Listed weight: 85 kg (187 lb)

Career information
- High school: Willetton Senior (Perth, Western Australia)
- College: Green Bay (2004–2005); Ouachita Baptist (2005–2008)
- NBA draft: 2008: undrafted
- Playing career: 2001–2017
- Position: Guard

Career history
- 2001–2002: Mandurah Magic
- 2004–2005: Mandurah Magic
- 2009: Harbour Heat
- 2010: Southland Sharks
- 2016–2017: Mandurah Magic

Daniel Adam Munday (born 7 March 1985) is an Australian former basketball player.

== Early life ==
Munday was born in Karratha, Western Australia. He graduated from Willetton Senior High School in Perth in 2002.

== Basketball career ==
Munday played for the Mandurah Magic in the State Basketball League (SBL) in 2001 and 2002. He also played for the Magic in 2004 and 2005.

Munday played four seasons of college basketball in the United States. He spent one season in Wisconsin at the University of Green Bay before transferring to Ouachita Baptist University in Arkansas, where he spent three years with the Tigers between 2005 and 2008.

For the 2009 New Zealand NBL season, Munday joined the Harbour Heat, where he started every match and averaged just under eight points a game. For the 2010 New Zealand NBL season, he played in the inaugural Southland Sharks team.

In 2016 and 2017, Munday once again played for the Mandurah Magic.

== Personal life ==
Munday the son of Greg and Sheryl Munday. His mother is from New Zealand. His partner Emily is from the United States.
