= James Paringatai =

New Zealand basketball player

Personal information
- Born: 7 January 1986 (age 40) Taihape, New Zealand
- Listed height: 201 cm (6 ft 7 in)
- Listed weight: 117 kg (258 lb)

Career information
- High school: Taihape College (Taihape, New Zealand); Wanganui City College (Whanganui, New Zealand)
- Playing career: 2004–2022
- Position: Power forward

Career history
- 2004: Manawatu Jets
- 2005: Wellington Saints
- 2006–2008: Manawatu Jets
- 2009: Taranaki Dynamos
- 2010–2016: Southland Sharks
- 2016: Mandurah Magic
- 2017–2020: Geraldton Buccaneers
- 2022: Toowoomba Mountaineers

Career highlights
- SBL champion (2019); 2× NZNBL champion (2013, 2015)

James Louis Paringatai (born 7 January 1986) is a New Zealand former basketball player. He played 13 seasons in the New Zealand National Basketball League (NZNBL), with his most notable stint coming with the Southland Sharks between 2010 and 2016. He captained the Sharks to NZNBL championships in 2013 and 2015. He played in the State Basketball League (SBL) between 2016 and 2020, winning an SBL championship with the Geraldton Buccaneers in 2019.

== Early life ==
Paringatai was born in Taihape, played two seasons with Wanganui City College, and went to Australia with the New Zealand under-20 and under-23 teams. Growing up in Taihape, Paringatai loved being outdoors and spending time with family. He played rugby union as a youth before picking up basketball as an early teenager.

== Basketball career ==
Paringatai debuted in the National Basketball League (NBL) with the Manawatu Jets in 2004 as an 18-year-old. In December that year, he trialled with the Sydney Kings of the Australian NBL. Paringatai was described as a "mini Pero Cameron" in his early years in the NBL and seemed destined to play for the Tall Blacks. However, his development was hampered by a lack of consistency and conditioning issues.

In 2005, Paringatai played for the Wellington Saints. The next three years were spent with the Manawatu Jets before his move to New Plymouth in 2009. He had a breakout season during the Taranaki Dynamos' zero-win, 16-loss campaign – averaging 13 points a game and starting in every match he was available for.

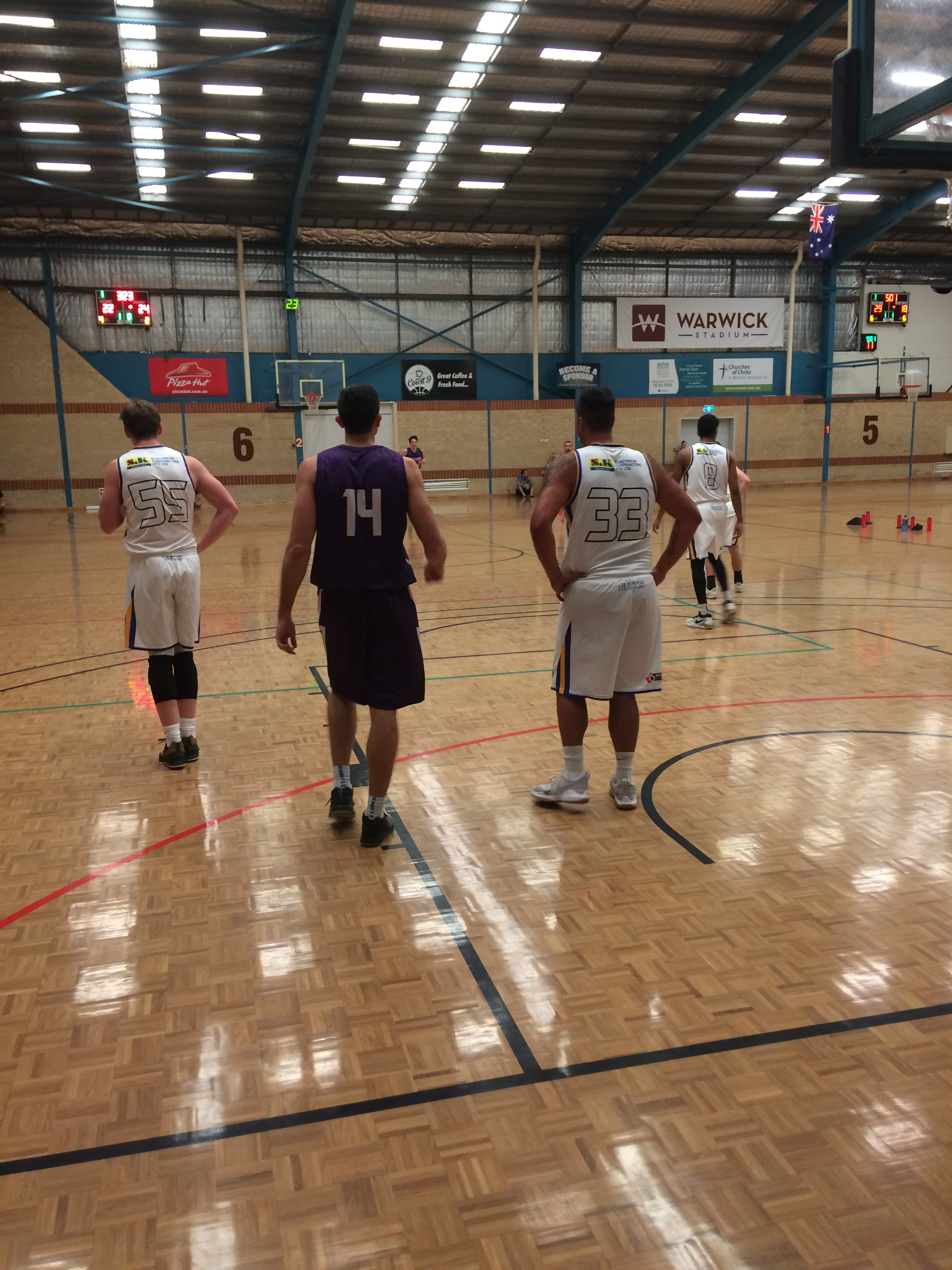
Paringatai (#33) in March 2018, alongside Jarrad Prue (#14) of the Lakeside Lightning during a pre-season game

Paringatai was one of the first players to sign with the Southland Sharks for their inaugural season in 2010. He started for Southland in the first half of the 2010 season, but was consigned to a role off the bench after that, a role that stemmed into the 2011 season. Following the 2011 season, he made a conscious decision to get fitter in the off-season and alter his eating habits; he subsequently shed 14 kilograms. In May 2012, Paringatai became the first player in the club's history to play 50 games. He captained the Sharks in their first game in the league in March 2010, and went on to play in 50 straight games.

In 2013, Paringatai was captain of the Sharks' maiden championship-winning team. He also won the FIBA Pacific Games with the NZ Maori team. Paringatai had a solid 2013 NBL season, capped in the 114–67 rout of the Otago Nuggets where in 13 minutes he shot five of seven from the field, dropped a three pointer, and added five rebounds.

In 2015, Paringatai became the first player to bring up 100 games for the Sharks. As co-captain, he helped the Sharks win their second championship in three years.

In November 2015, Paringatai re-signed with the Sharks for the 2016 New Zealand NBL season. Described by the club as the "ultimate team man", Paringatai said at the time there were other offers on the table, but he never wanted to leave the Sharks.

In June 2016, Paringatai joined the Mandurah Magic of the State Basketball League (SBL) midway through the 2016 SBL season.

In January 2017, it was announced that Paringatai would not be returning to the Sharks for the 2017 season, after being offered a contract to once again play in the SBL. He was originally recruited by the Kalamunda Eastern Suns, but it did not pan out. He subsequently joined the Geraldton Buccaneers. He played his third season with Geraldton in 2019 and was a member of the Buccaneers' championship-winning team. He continued on with the Buccaneers in 2020 for the West Coast Classic.

In April 2022, Paringatai joined the Toowoomba Mountaineers of the third-tiered Queensland State League (QSL). He helped the Mountaineers reach the QSL semi-final.

== Personal life ==
Paringatai is the son of Parry and Sarah. In 2011, Paringatai became a father for the first time, when son Cooper-James was born. In 2013, Paringatai graduated with his Bachelor of Sport and Recreation degree from the Southern Institute of Technology.

Paringatai is close friends with former Southland Stags fullback Glen Horton, and fellow basketball player Jeremiah Trueman.
