= Jonathan Yim =

American basketball coach (born 1984)

Personal information
- Born: May 27, 1984 (age 42) Los Angeles, California, U.S.

Career information
- Position: Head coach
- Coaching career: 2011–present

Career history

Coaching
- 2011–2012: Los Angeles Clippers (Associate)
- 2012–2021: Portland Trail Blazers (Various)
- 2021–2023: South Bay Lakers (Assistant)
- 2023–2024: Greensboro Swarm (Assistant)
- 2024–2026: Southland Sharks (Head)
- 2025–present: USC (Assistant)

Career highlights
- NZNBL Grand Finalist (2025); NZNBL Champion (2026); Southland Coach of the Year (2026)

Jonathan Robert Yim (born May 27, 1984) is an American professional basketball coach. He served as head coach of the Southland Sharks of the New Zealand National Basketball League (NZNBL) from 2025 to 2026, leading the team to the 2026 NZNBL championship. He has also worked as an assistant coach for the USC Trojans women's basketball program and spent more than a decade in staff roles in the National Basketball Association (NBA) and NBA G League.

== Early life ==
Yim is a fourth-generation Korean American from Orange County, California; his ancestors were among the first Korean immigrants to the United States, arriving in 1905 to work on pineapple plantations in Hawaii. His father, a minister at the Crystal Cathedral, died of a heart aneurysm when Yim was a freshman in high school.

Yim began coaching a year after his father's death, volunteering at 14 to coach a sixth-grade girls team at a Boys and Girls Club, and continued coaching youth teams throughout high school. He went on to coach at several Orange County high schools, including the girls varsity team at Orange High School at age 19, the boys program at Santa Margarita Catholic High School, and Crystal Cathedral High School, where he became the winningest coach in school history. He attended California State University, Fullerton and worked as a teacher before leaving the profession at age 28 to pursue basketball full-time.

== NBA and college career ==
Yim's path to the NBA began when, while coaching at Santa Margarita, he found a discarded flyer advertising shooting lessons by Bob Thate, a former NBA shooting coach. The two became friends, and Thate began bringing Yim along to assist at private workouts with NBA players, which led to Yim getting to know the Los Angeles Clippers coaching staff and earning an internship in the team's video department. He was subsequently hired by the Portland Trail Blazers as head video coordinator, and he spent eight seasons with the Portland organization under head coach Terry Stotts, moving into a player development role and serving at times as an assistant coach. In addition to breaking down individual and team video for scouting, Yim conducted individual workouts with Trail Blazers players before games and practices and developed a reputation for his work ethic, regularly working long hours at the team's practice facility, where players who stopped by for late-night shooting sessions would often find him. He worked closely with players including Damian Lillard, CJ McCollum, and Ed Davis.

Yim's ambitions and experiences as an Asian American coach have been the subject of media features over more than a decade, including a 2014 profile in KoreAm Journal, a 2020 Andscape story on the underrepresentation of Asian coaches in the NBA, and a 2021 The New York Times feature on Korean Americans working in professional basketball, in which he discussed the stereotypes faced by Asian American coaches and his aspiration of one day becoming an NBA head coach; in the Times story, Stotts described Yim as an instrumental part of his staff.

From 2021 to 2023 he was an assistant coach with the South Bay Lakers, the NBA G League affiliate of the Los Angeles Lakers, followed by an assistant coaching role with the Greensboro Swarm, the G League affiliate of the Charlotte Hornets, from 2023 to 2024, giving him 13 years of experience across the NBA and G League.

In November 2025, Yim was hired as an assistant coach with the USC Trojans women's basketball team, working in the role between his two NZNBL seasons.

=== 2019 car accident and recovery ===
On April 24, 2019, during the Trail Blazers' playoff run, Yim was seriously injured in a car crash on Interstate 84 east of Portland that also involved his mother, sister, and brother-in-law. He was extricated from the vehicle by Portland Fire & Rescue and hospitalized at Legacy Emanuel Medical Center, where he underwent two surgeries for injuries that included a broken femur, neck fractures, a fractured hand, a collapsed lung, and a concussion. The Trail Blazers coaching staff wore bow ties, a nod to Yim's tradition of wearing them for Wednesday games, during Game 2 of the team's Western Conference semifinal series against the Denver Nuggets in his honor, and head coach Terry Stotts dedicated a playoff win to him.

Although doctors projected he would need a wheelchair for three months and a cane for two more, Yim returned to the Trail Blazers' bench before the end of the 2018–19 season, appearing for Game 4 of the Western Conference Finals against the Golden State Warriors. In September 2019, roughly four months after leaving the hospital, he completed the Ironman 70.3 Santa Cruz triathlon, a goal he had set for himself while hospitalized.

== Southland Sharks ==
=== 2025 season ===
Yim was named head coach of the Southland Sharks in November 2024, succeeding Guy Molloy ahead of the 2025 NZNBL season. The Sharks had finished second-to-last in 2024. Among Yim's signings was American forward Josiah Allick, who joined the Sharks on his first professional contract after his college career and was initially expected to stay for only the first half of the season before the club extended him for the full campaign. Allick went on to be named the 2025 NZNBL Most Valuable Player, becoming the first player in Sharks history to win the award, while also earning All-Star Five, Most Outstanding Forward, and rebounding champion honours.

After beginning the season with a 1–5 record, the team won nine consecutive games to finish fourth in the regular season, then defeated the Auckland Tuatara and the defending champion Canterbury Rams in the playoffs to reach the Grand Final, where they lost 88–83 to the Wellington Saints.

=== 2026 season ===
Yim returned for a second season in 2026, with several players reportedly taking pay cuts to keep the core of the Grand Final roster together. The Sharks led the league standings for much of the season and were the subject of a feature in The Post during a mid-season winning run. The team put together a 10-game winning streak during the regular season before it was ended by the Taranaki Airs in June, a stretch during which the team dealt with injuries to several key players, including Rylan Jones, Max Darling, and Tukaha Cooper. In June 2026, Yim was named Coach of the Year at the ILT Southland Sports Awards in recognition of the 2025 campaign.

During his tenure, Yim was noted for his engagement with the Southland community, including speaking at local business events, meeting with sponsors and supporters, and attending regional events such as the Bluff Oyster and Food Festival. He also stated a goal of becoming the first Sharks coach to sell out ILT Stadium Southland.

The Sharks again reached the Grand Final, hosted at ILT Stadium Southland in Invercargill. In what Yim had announced would be his final game in charge, Southland defeated the Wellington Saints 104–101 in overtime to win the 2026 NZNBL championship in front of 3,770 spectators, the first sellout in the club's history and the largest crowd for a basketball game in Invercargill. The title was the franchise's fourth and its first since 2018. Yim finished his two-season tenure with the Sharks with an overall record of 33–13.

== Personal life ==
Yim has cited his father as the biggest influence on his career. He is married and has a son. His younger sister, Tabitha Yim, is a former elite artistic gymnast who competed for the United States at the 2001 World Artistic Gymnastics Championships and is the head coach of the Stanford Cardinal women's gymnastics team.
