= Riverside Rowing Club =

- Motto: Possent quia posse videntum. They Won because they thought they could.
- Location: Adelaide, SA
- Coordinates: 34°55′10″S 138°35′28″E
- Home water: River Torrens
- Founded: 1943
- Affiliations: Rowing SA
- Website: www.riversiderowing.asn.au

Riverside Rowing Club Incorporated (RRC) is a non profit association located in South Australia. RRC has a strong Masters Rowing focus (27 years and over) and actively supports senior and school rowing.

RRC competitive rowers race in local Rowing SA regattas, Rowing Australia Regattas, and World Masters Games. and International Rowing Federation(FISA) regattas held around the globe. Annually a number of crews compete in Head Races including the Head of the Yarra in Melbourne Victoria. The club's membership includes recreational (non-competitive) rowers and regularly holds "Learn to Row" programs throughout the year.

== History ==
The club was formed in 1943 in South Australia, and was originally known as the South Australian Railways Institute Rowing Club (SARIRC). In 1977 the club was renamed the Australian National Railways Institute Rowing Club (Central region). In 1994 the club changed its name to the Riverside Rowing Club.

== The clubrooms ==
The Riverside clubhouse is a two-storey building located on the banks of the River Torrens, approximately 100 meters west of the Victoria Bridge (Morphett Street Bridge) towards the weir. The upper storey of the clubhouse includes a veranda overlooking the Torrens, and contains a bar, kitchen and change rooms for use by members, as well as a collection of memorabilia, photographs and awards reflecting the club's history. A boat storage area, gym, Concept2 indoor rower equipment are located on the ground floor of the building.

The current building on the River Torrens was renovated in 2002.

Since 2005 Riverside has also operated out of a bay at the Rowing SA complex located at West Lakes.

== Colours and motto ==
The club colours are red, green and yellow. The club motto is Possent quia posse videntum: they won because they thought they could.

RRC's mission statement is "to provide the necessary resources and support to encourage participation and competition in rowing and develop successful involvement at all levels in the sport."

== Notable members ==
The club has many past notable members including:

- Graeme King - internationally recognised racing boat designer and builder began rowing at the age of 16 at the South Australian Railways Institute Rowing Club (SARIRC)in 1963.
- Mike Nielsen - represented SA in winning King's Cup crew 1981, 1982 and 1983.
- Elaine Guterres - Order of Australia Medal recipient in the Queen’s Birthday Honors List 2012 for her contribution to rowing
- Alison Davies - dual Olympian and a junior world champion.

== Bibliography ==
- Orr, Hugh(2011) One Club, Three Names: The History of the Riverside Rowing Club Adelaide, South Australia 1943-2009
- Burgoine, Garth(2000) Memories of the South Australian Railways Institute Rowing Club
