= Southland Sharks =

Basketball team in Invercargill, New Zealand

- League: NZNBL
- Founded: December 2009
- History: Southland Sharks; 2010–2019; 2021–
- Arena: Stadium Southland
- Location: Invercargill, Southland, New Zealand
- Team colours: Orange, blue, black
- Main sponsor: SBS Bank
- Chairman: David Simpson
- General manager: Murray Brown
- Head coach: Jonathan Yim
- Championships: 4 (2013, 2015, 2018, 2026)
- Retired numbers: 2 (12, 35)
- Website: SharksBasketball.co.nz
Home	Away

The Southland Sharks are a New Zealand professional men's basketball team based in Invercargill. The Sharks compete in the National Basketball League (NBL) and play their home games at Stadium Southland. For sponsorship reasons, they are known as the SBS Bank Southland Sharks.

== Team history ==
The Southland Sharks brand dates back to the 1990s when the Smokefree Southland Sharks competed in the Conference Basketball League (CBL) and won championships in 1995 and 1998. In 2002, a group of local businessmen launched a bid to enter a Southland team into the National Basketball League (NBL), but that attempt fell over late in the piece when the Community Trust of Southland declined a $150,000 application.

In October 2009, Southland Basketball Association was granted a three-year NBL license. In December 2009, the Sharks were confirmed for the 2010 NBL season.

The Sharks made playoff appearances in their first two seasons in the NBL, before missing the post-season in 2012. In 2013, the Sharks won their maiden NBL championship with a 92–81 win over the Nelson Giants in the final. After another playoff appearance in 2014, the Sharks won their first minor premiership in 2015, before going on to reach the NBL final, where they won their second championship with a 72–68 win over the Wellington Saints. With the win, they broke the 2001 Waikato Titans 15-game winning streak to finish the season with 16 wins in a row. The 2015 season also saw the Sharks retire Kevin Braswell's No. 12 jersey.

After another playoff appearance in 2016, the Sharks made their third NBL final in 2017, where they lost 108–75 to the Saints. In 2018, the Sharks returned to the NBL final for the fourth time in six years, where they won their third championship with a 98–96 win over the Saints.

The Sharks sat out the 2020 season due to the COVID-19 pandemic.

In 2022, the Sharks' inaugural sponsors SIT Zero Fees decided to end its long-term partnership with the team.

In 2025, the Sharks returned to the NBL final for the first time since 2018 behind league MVP, Josiah Allick. In the final, the Sharks lost 88–83 to the Wellington Saints. The Sharks returned to the NBL final in 2026, where they defeated the Saints 104–101 in overtime to win their fourth championship.

== Honour roll ==
NBL Championships:	4 (2013, 2015, 2018, 2026)
NBL Playoff appearances:	12 (2010, 2011, 2013, 2014, 2015, 2016, 2017, 2018, 2019, 2021, 2025, 2026)
NBL Grand Final appearances:	6 (2013, 2015, 2017, 2018, 2025, 2026)
MVP:	Josiah Allick (2025)
Finals MVP:	Leon Henry (2013), Tai Wesley (2015), Reuben Te Rangi (2018)
All-Star Five:	René Rougeau (2010), Brian Conklin (2013), Todd Blanchfield (2015), Tai Wesley (2015), Alex Pledger (2016), Jarrad Weeks (2018), Dom Kelman-Poto (2021), Jeremy Kendle (2023), Josiah Allick (2025)
Most Outstanding Forward:	Brian Conklin (2013), Tai Wesley (2015), Josiah Allick (2025)
Scoring Champion:	Jeremy Kendle (2023)
Rebounding Champion:	Alex Pledger (2016), Josiah Allick (2025)
Rookie of the Year:	Martin Iti (2010)
Coach of the Year:	Paul Henare (2013, 2015)

== Players ==
=== Current roster ===
Note: Flags indicate national team eligibility at FIBA-sanctioned events. Players may hold other non-FIBA nationalities not displayed.

Southland Sharks roster
Players
Coaches

Pos.	No.	Nat.	Name	Ht.
G	1	(United States)	Jones, Rylan (I)	1.83 m (6 ft 0 in)
F	2	(New Zealand)	Leger, Will	2.03 m (6 ft 8 in)
F	3	(New Zealand)	Inger, Brayden	2.03 m (6 ft 8 in)
G	5	(United States)	Asberry, Caleb (I)	1.90 m (6 ft 3 in)
G	6	(New Zealand)	Ramage, Jack	1.95 m (6 ft 5 in)
F	8	(New Zealand)	Darling, Max	1.98 m (6 ft 6 in)
F	9	(New Zealand)	Wynyard, Tautoko	2.08 m (6 ft 10 in)
G	10	(New Zealand)	Webster, Quake	1.78 m (5 ft 10 in)
G	11	(New Zealand)	Cameron, Tobias	1.96 m (6 ft 5 in)
G	13	(New Zealand)	Bertinshaw, Dane	1.94 m (6 ft 4 in)
G	14	(New Zealand)	Cooper, Tukaha	1.90 m (6 ft 3 in)
F	15	(New Zealand)	Snow, Riley	1.98 m (6 ft 6 in)
F	16	(New Zealand)	Stodart, Mac	2.03 m (6 ft 8 in)
G	18	(New Zealand)	Helu, Johnny	1.88 m (6 ft 2 in)
F	20	(United States)	Boone, Keylan (I)	2.03 m (6 ft 8 in)
F	22	(New Zealand)	Lee, Cairo
F	24	(New Zealand)	Jack, William
F/C	33	(New Zealand)	Timmins, Sam (C)	2.11 m (6 ft 11 in)

Head coach

- (United States) Jonathan Yim

Assistant coach(es)

- (New Zealand) Mark Bell
- (New Zealand) Connor Coll
- (New Zealand) Aled Jones

Legend

- (C) Team captain
- (DP) Development player
- (IN) Inactive
- (I) Import player
- Injured

- Roster
Updated: 31 May 2026

=== Notable past players ===
- (United States) Larry Abney
- (New Zealand) Everard Bartlett
- (Australia) Todd Blanchfield
- (New Zealand) Craig Bradshaw
- (United States) Kevin Braswell
- (United States) Brian Conklin
- (New Zealand) Gareth Dawson
- (New Zealand) / (Australia) Mark Dickel
- (United States) Kaniel Dickens
- (United States) Mike Helms
- (New Zealand) Paul Henare
- (New Zealand) Leon Henry
- (New Zealand) / (Australia) Martin Iti
- (United States) Jordair Jett
- (Australia) Nick Kay
- (New Zealand) / (Australia) Adrian Majstrovich
- (Australia) / (New Zealand) Luke Martin
- (Australia) Daniel Munday
- (Australia) Mitch Norton
- (New Zealand) James Paringatai
- (New Zealand) Alex Pledger
- (New Zealand) Brendon Polyblank
- (United States) / (New Zealand) Dion Prewster
- (United States) Mike Rose
- (United States) René Rougeau
- (New Zealand) Reuben Te Rangi
- (New Zealand) / (United Kingdom) Arthur Trousdell
- (United States) / (Guam) Tai Wesley

=== Retired numbers ===
Southland Sharks Retired Numbers
No	Nat.	Player	Position	Tenure	Ceremony date
12	(United States)	Kevin Braswell	PG	2011–2015	19th June 2015
35	(New Zealand)	Alex Pledger	C	2016–2023	6th July 2023
