= Yarra Yarra Rowing Club =

- Motto: Inter nos pari passu
- Location: Melbourne, Victoria
- Coordinates: 37.8197°S 144.9712°E
- Home water: Yarra River
- Founded: 1871
- Affiliations: Rowing Victoria
- Website: www.yyrc.com.au

The Yarra Yarra Rowing Club is a rowing club on the Yarra River in Melbourne. It was founded in the 1870s by members of the Early Closing Association when several drapers in Bourke Street agreed to close on Saturday afternoons.
