= Champion Lakes Boat Club =

Acquatic club in Perth, Western Australia

Champion Lakes Boat Club was formed in 2008 and is the only aquatic club in Western Australia to combine dragon boating, kayaking, rowing, and radio sailing. Located at Champion Lakes Regatta Centre, Henley Drive, Champion Lakes, Western Australia.

Champion Lakes is the only world class venue available in Western Australia and has made dragon boating, kayaking, rowing, and radio sailing more accessible to the Southern suburbs due to its close proximity to surrounding suburbs such as Armadale, Kelmscott, Westfield and Roleystone compared to other clubs. In addition to this, it has become the primary regatta centre for many kayaking, rowing, and dragon boating events, as well as state team selections.

The clubhouse comprises two sheds, one for rowing equipment, and the other for kayaking, dragon boating, and radio sailing, with practices being available for kayaking and rowing most mornings and radio sailing and dragon boating most evenings.

Due to its youth, the club has struggled to get representatives in the higher levels of their respective disciplines however, there have been several state and national team representatives, such as Suzie Edwards, Todd Clappinson, Vuthoeun Moeun, Daniel Foucar, Russel Clappinson and John Bienke for the Dragon boating U16, U18, premier, Senior A and senior C national Auroras teams respectively, Sam Mctigue for the national kayaking team, and Jennifer Parker and Daniel Real for the rowing state masters team.

== Champion Lakes Rowing Club ==
Champion Lakes Rowing Club was first established in 2009, and in 2013 won its first state title for the women's E grade double scull. In 2014, an improved training regime lead to the club following this up with a 2nd place in the Women's C grade single and double, a state title in the men's C grade pair and single, and two state titles for the women's E grade coxed four and women's D grade coxed quad scull.
