= List of basketball clubs in Australia =

Basketball clubs in Australia include clubs competing nationally in the National Basketball League (NBL) and Women's National Basketball League (WNBL). State-level clubs competing in NBL1 are covered separately in the List of NBL1 clubs.

== National ==
National Basketball League

Club	Location
Adelaide 36ers	Adelaide
Brisbane Bullets	Brisbane
Cairns Taipans	Cairns
Illawarra Hawks	Wollongong
Melbourne United	Melbourne
Perth Wildcats	Perth
South East Melbourne Phoenix	Melbourne
Sydney Kings	Sydney
Tasmania JackJumpers	Hobart / Launceston

Women's National Basketball League

Club	Location
Adelaide Lightning	Adelaide
Bendigo Spirit	Bendigo
Melbourne Boomers	Melbourne
Perth Lynx	Perth
Southside Flyers	Dandenong
Sydney Uni Flames	Sydney
Townsville Fire	Townsville
University of Canberra Capitals	Canberra

== State ==
NBL1

See List of NBL1 clubs

== See also ==
- Basketball in Australia
- List of Australian rules football clubs in Australia
- List of cricket clubs in Australia
- List of baseball teams in Australia
- List of rowing clubs in Australia
- List of rugby league clubs in Australia
- List of rugby union clubs in Australia
- List of yacht clubs in Australia
