= Josiah Allick =

American basketball player (born 2001)

No. 53 – Greensboro Swarm
- Position: Forward
- League: NBA G League

Personal information
- Born: June 2, 2001 (age 25) San Antonio, Texas, U.S.
- Listed height: 6 ft 8 in (2.03 m)
- Listed weight: 235 lb (107 kg)

Career information
- High school: Lincoln North Star (Lincoln, Nebraska)
- College: Kansas City (2019–2022); New Mexico (2022–2023); Nebraska (2023–2024)
- NBA draft: 2024: undrafted
- Playing career: 2025–present

Career history
- 2025: Southland Sharks
- 2025–present: Greensboro Swarm

Career highlights
- NBA G League champion (2026); NZNBL Most Valuable Player (2025); NZNBL All-Star Five (2025); NZNBL Most Outstanding Forward (2025); NZNBL rebounding champion (2025)
- Stats at NBA.com
- Stats at Basketball Reference

Josiah Benjamin Allick (born June 2, 2001) is an American professional basketball player for the Greensboro Swarm of the NBA G League. He played college basketball for the Kansas City Roos, New Mexico Lobos and Nebraska Cornhuskers. In his professional debut in 2025 with the Southland Sharks of the New Zealand National Basketball League (NZNBL), he was named NZNBL Most Valuable Player.

== Early life ==
Allick was born in San Antonio, Texas. He attended Lincoln North Star High School in Lincoln, Nebraska, where he averaged 15.3 points and 9.8 rebounds per game as a senior. He was named to the All-Lincoln City first team and All-Conference second team, and set school record for rebounds in a season (255) and game (18). He recorded 38 points and 18 rebounds against Omaha North in the district tournament. He also played football and competed in track and field for the Navigators.

== College career ==
=== Kansas City (2019–2022) ===
In May 2019, Allick signed a National Letter of Intent to play college basketball for the University of Missouri–Kansas City.

As a freshman for the Kansas City Roos in 2019–20, Allick played in all 30 games and made 12 starts, averaging 5.7 points and 3.9 rebounds per game. He scored in double figures nine times, including a season-high 18 points against Crowley's Ridge on January 27, 2020. He had 11 points and a career-high 13 rebounds against Grand Canyon on January 19. His 118 total rebounds were good for seventh in KC single-season history for freshman rebounding. He earned Academic All-WAC selection.

As a sophomore in 2020–21, Allick started in all 22 games he appeared in, averaging 15.0 points and 6.0 rebounds in 27.0 minutes per game. He led the Summit League with 57.3 field goal percentage. He scored in double figures in 18 games, including seven 20-point games. He had a career-high 29 points against Greenville on November 27, 2020, and a career-high 13 rebounds against Kansas Christian on December 19. He earned Honorable Mention All-Summit and Summit League Academic Honor Roll.

As a junior in 2021–22, Allick appeared in 17 games and made 16 starts, but missed 14 games mid-season due to injury. He averaged 12.9 points and a team-high 6.1 rebounds in 27.1 minutes per game. He scored in double figures in 11 games, including the final five games of the season. He had a season-high 21 points in the season opener against Minnesota on November 9, 2021, and matched it with 21 points in the regular-season finale against South Dakota State on February 26, 2022. He had 18 points and a season-high 12 rebounds against South Dakota on February 24. He was named to the Summit League Academic Honor Roll for the second straight year.

=== New Mexico (2022–2023) ===
In May 2022, Allick transferred to New Mexico.

As a senior for the Lobos in 2022–23, Allick started all 34 games and averaged 8.4 points and 7.3 rebounds per game. He had 13 double-figure scoring games and two double-doubles. He scored a season-high 18 points against SMU on November 15, 2022, and had a career-high 18 rebounds against Boise State on January 20, 2023.

Allick graduated from New Mexico in 2023.

=== Nebraska (2023–2024) ===
In May 2023, Allick transferred to Nebraska with one year of eligibility remaining due to the COVID-19 exemption in 2020–21.

In his fifth and final college season with the Cornhuskers in 2023–24, Allick played in 33 games and made 27 starts, helping Nebraska to 23 wins and their first NCAA Tournament appearance since 2014. He averaged 7.3 points, 5.4 rebounds and 1.3 assists per game. He had a season-high 16 points against Michigan and a season-high 12 rebounds against Rutgers. He closed his college career with his second double-double of the season with 14 points, 11 rebounds and three assists against Texas A&M in the Huskers' 2024 NCAA Tournament game.

In June 2024, Allick joined the Husker basketball staff as a graduate assistant for the 2024–25 season while rehabbing following ankle surgery. He worked on his master's degree in business administration during his two years at Nebraska.

== Professional career ==
=== Southland Sharks (2025) ===
In February 2025, Allick signed his first professional contract with the Southland Sharks of the New Zealand National Basketball League (NZNBL). He initially signed for the first half of the 2025 season, but later agreed to remain with the team for the full season. The Sharks were not title considers entering the season and started with a 1–5 record. He was named NZNBL Most Valuable Player, becoming the first player in Southland Sharks history to earn the honor after averaging 19 points, 11.2 rebounds, and 2.6 assists per game while leading the Sharks to the postseason. He was also named to the All-Star Five, the league's Most Outstanding Forward, and rebounding champion. In the semi-final, Allick had 21 points and 15 rebounds in a 101–82 win over the Canterbury Rams. It marked nine straight wins heading into the grand final. In the grand final, he had 15 points, nine rebounds, and six assists in an 88–83 loss to the Wellington Saints. In 23 games, he averaged 19.0 points, 11.3 rebounds and 3.0 assists per game.

=== Greensboro Swarm (2025–present) ===
In October 2025, Allick joined the Greensboro Swarm of the NBA G League. On January 5, 2026, he recorded a double-double of 21 points and 10 rebounds off the bench in a 149–119 win over the Grand Rapids Gold. He helped the Swarm win the NBA G League championship for the 2025–26 season. On the season, Allick averaged 6.6 points per game on 68 percent shooting, along with 5.7 rebounds and 1.0 blocks in 28 games for the Swarm.

On August 31, 2026, Allick signed an Exhibit 10 contract with the Charlotte Hornets, only to be waived the following day. He subsequently returned to the Swarm for the 2026–27 NBA G League season.

== Personal life ==
Allick is the son of Melvin Anthony Allick II and Colleen Ziegelbein, and has five siblings. His father was a swimmer at UNLV and his mother was a basketball athlete at Northwest Missouri State. His younger sister, Rebekah, played for the Nebraska Cornhuskers women's volleyball team, while his stepfather, Bill Ziegelbein, played football at Nebraska from 1987 to 1991. Bill Ziegelbein died in 2013.
