= Dickel (surname) =

Dickel is a surname. Notable people with the surname include:

- Carl Dickel (born 1946), New Zealand cricketer
- Dan Dickel (born 1952), American football player
- Friedrich Dickel (1913–1993), East German politician
- George A. Dickel (1818–1894), German-born American businessman
- Gerhard Dickel (1913–2017), German scientist
- Hélène R. Dickel (born 1938), American astronomer
- Mark Dickel (born 1976), New Zealand-Australian basketball player and coach
- Norbert Dickel (born 1961), German footballer
- Otto Dickel (1880–1944), German politician
- Richard Dickel (born 1975), New Zealand basketball coach
- Thomas Dickel (1897–1969), New Zealand cricketer

== See also ==
- Dickel (disambiguation)
