= Willy Liebel =

Nazi politician and SA general (1897–1945)

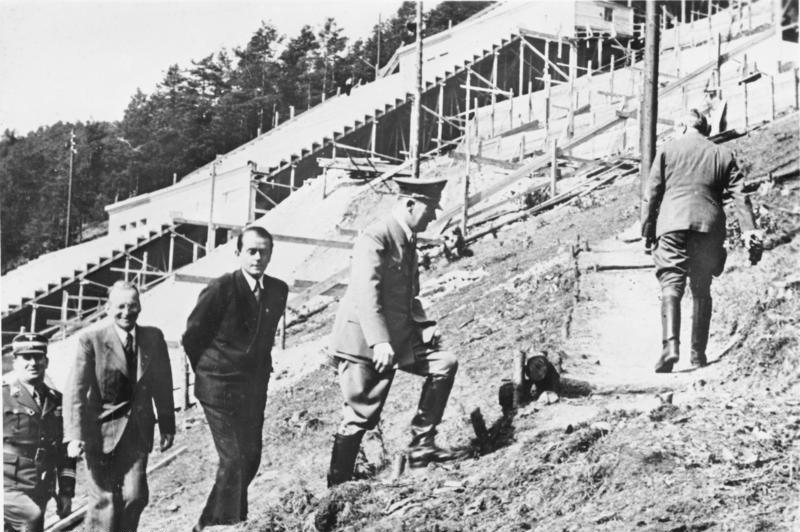
- From right to left: Adolf Hitler; Albert Speer and at the end Willy Liebel

Oberburgermeister, Nuremberg
- In office 15 March 1933 – 20 April 1945
- Preceded by: Hermann Luppe
- Succeeded by: Julius Rühm

Chief, Planning Department Reich Ministry of Armaments and War Production
- In office February 1942 – 20 April 1945

Other positions
- 1936–1945: Reichstag Deputy
- 1929–1933: City Councilor, Nuremberg

Personal details
- Born: Friedrich Wilhelm Liebel; 31 August 1897 Nuremberg, Kingdom of Bavaria, German Empire
- Died: 20 April 1945 (aged 47) Nuremberg, Bavaria, Nazi Germany
- Cause of death: Suicide by gunshot
- Resting place: Johannisfriedhof, Nuremberg
- Party: Nazi Party
- Occupation: Printing business owner
- Civilian awards: Golden Party Badge
- Nickname: Willy

Military service
- Allegiance: German Empire
- Branch/service: Royal Bavarian Army
- Years of service: 1914–1918
- Rank: Leutnant
- Unit: Royal Bavarian Life Guards
- Battles/wars: World War I
- Military awards: Iron Cross, 2nd class Military Merit Order, with swords Wound Badge

Friedrich Wilhelm "Willy" Liebel (31 August 1897 – 20 April 1945) was a German Nazi Party politician who served as the Oberburgermeister of Nuremberg during Nazi Germany from 1933 to 1945. He was instrumental in engineering the destruction of the Grand Synagogue of Nuremberg in 1938. He was a member of the paramilitary Sturmabteilung (SA) and rose to the rank of SA-Obergruppenführer. He also sat as a deputy in the Reichstag and died during the Battle of Nuremberg, most likely by suicide.

== Early years ==
Liebel was born in Nuremberg and was educated in the local Volksschule and Gymnasium. Following an apprenticeship in his father's printing and publishing shop, he took part as a one-year volunteer with the Royal Bavarian Life Guards in the First World War from 1914 to 1918. He attained the rank of Leutnant of reserves and was awarded the Iron Cross, 2nd class, the Military Merit Order with swords, and the Wound Badge. After discharge from the military, he returned to work in the family business from 1921 as a partner, and as sole owner from 1926. Liebel was a member of several right-wing militant organizations such as Reichsflagge (Imperial Flag) and Tannenbergbund (Tannenburg League) and, in 1923, he founded the Altreichsflagge (Old Imperial Flag).

On 5 November 1925, he joined the Nazi Party (membership number 23,091). As an early Party member, he later would be awarded the Golden Party Badge. He became the organization leader in the Nuremberg Ortsgruppe (local group) and later a Kreisleiter (district leader). In 1929 he was elected as a city councilor in Nuremberg and, from 1930, he was the leader of the Nazi faction on the council.

== Mayor of Nuremberg ==
Following the Nazi seizure of power on 30 January 1933, Liebel was installed as the acting Oberburgermeister of Nuremberg on 15 March and he was confirmed in the office on 27 April by the city council, which was dominated by the Nazis. He would remain in this post for the entire duration of the Nazi regime until his death in April 1945. He was also made the president of the district councils (Kreistage) of Upper Franconia and Middle Franconia.

Under Liebel's leadership, Nuremberg implemented the Nazi racial policies by purging the city administration of non-Aryans and others considered "undesirable". On 16 August 1933, 140 teachers and other civil servants were suspended or dismissed outright. Another 70 dismissals were still pending, and scores of laborers were discharged. In promising to carry out an even more extensive purge of teachers, Liebel was quoted as saying that the action "called for a good deal of brutality, and there is no lack of it. The Nazis have not forgotten what they suffered from the Red gang. If now some are hit by our action and hang and shoot themselves, it is only because they have been pigs for ten years".

Liebel was also chairman of the Zweckverband Reichsparteitag, which organized and carried out the Nuremberg rallies that took place annually in Nuremberg from 1933 to 1938. Under his administration, the Nazi Party Rally Grounds that were largely designed by Albert Speer were constructed. Liebel also embarked upon a program of urban architectural renewal that he felt befitted one of the centers of Nazi pageantry. The aim was to restore the city center to the medieval look of centuries past by exposing half-timbering and, in particular, eliminating late nineteenth-century styling. Among the buildings he slated for demolition was the Grand Synagogue of Nuremberg. He felt that this "foreign" building with its Moorish revival architecture could not be reconciled with the "Old German" image that he strove to create. He described it as "the worst building sin of past decades … a settlement can only be reached through the complete removal of the synagogue". He succeeded in having the building completely demolished around the time of the Party rally in September 1938. This was two months before the widespread anti-Jewish pogrom known as Kristallnacht. Later in Liebel's mayoralty, the Jews of Nuremberg were rounded up and deported to the extermination camps in the east. Beginning in November 1941, the police president of Nuremberg, then-SS-Brigadeführer Benno Martin, oversaw the deportation of over 1,300 Jews.

Most of Liebel's tenure in Nuremberg was characterized by a fierce rivalry with Julius Streicher, who was the powerful Gauleiter of Franconia. Streicher was removed from his post in February 1940 for financial and moral corruption by a decision of the Supreme Party Court. His chief accusers were Liebel and Martin, both of whom had been intriguing against him for years. After Streicher's removal, a similar rivalry developed with Streicher's protégé, Karl Holz after he became Gauleiter in April 1942.

== Other offices ==
In March 1936, Liebel was elected as a deputy to the Reichstag from electoral constituency 26 (Franconia). Reelected in April 1938, he retained this seat until his death. Liebel was also a member of the Sturmabteilung (SA), in which he reached the rank of SA-Obergruppenführer in August 1941. During the Second World War, when Speer was placed in charge of the Reich Ministry of Armaments and War Production in February 1942, he appointed Liebel to be head of the Planning Department. It was Liebel who informed Speer, who had been absent from Berlin in September 1944, of Hitler's determination to implement a scorched earth strategy.

== Death ==
In April 1945, Liebel was in Nuremberg when the city came under attack by the US Army in a fierce, five-day battle. Together with the rest of the local Party leadership, Liebel was headquartered in a bunker at the police headquarters, one of the last strongholds held. Although accounts of his death differ, most indicate that he died of suicide by a gunshot to the head in the early hours of 20 April – coincidentally on Hitler's 56th birthday. This is the version recounted by Oberst Richard Wolf, a senior Wehrmacht commander present in the police bunker. Another account alleges that he was shot by Holz, his longtime political rival, because Liebel favored surrendering the city while the more fanatical Holz argued for continued last-ditch resistance. Liebel's corpse was first buried in the St. Rochus Cemetery. A few months later, it was exhumed and reburied in the family plot in the Johannisfriedhof. In legal proceedings to determine the cause of his death in 1956, a German court determined that it was suicide.
