= Roth (Zusam) =

River in Germany

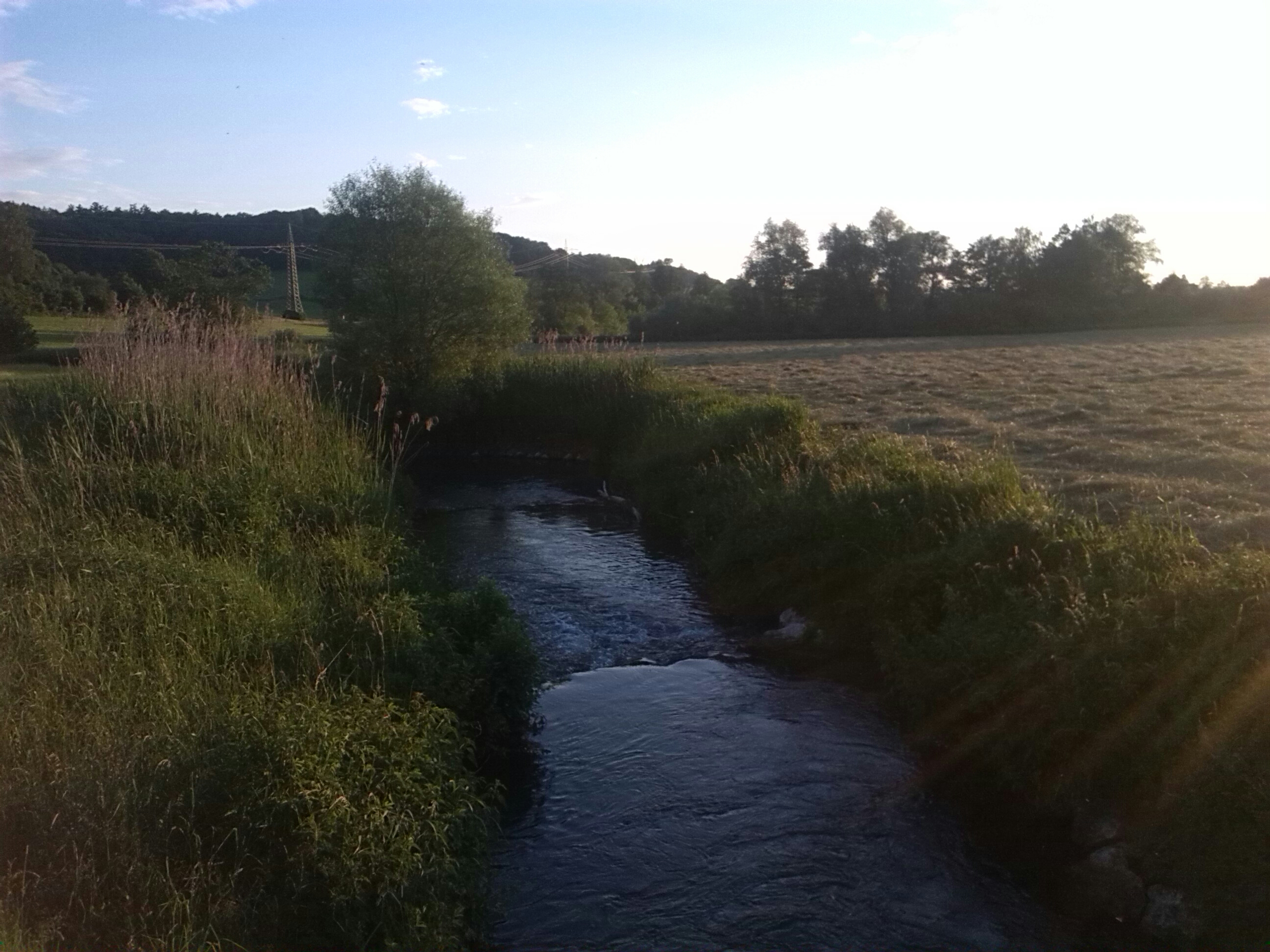

Location
- Country: Germany
- State: Bavaria

Physical characteristics
- Mouth
  - location: Zusam
  - coordinates: 48.4071°N 10.5932°E
- Length: 14.0 km (8.7 mi)

Basin features
- Progression: Zusam→ Danube→ Black Sea

Roth (German pronunciation: [ʁoːt]) is a river of Bavaria, Germany. It is a right tributary of the Zusam in Zusmarshausen.

== See also ==
- List of rivers of Bavaria
