= Hans Zimmermann =

German Nazi Party official (1906–1984)

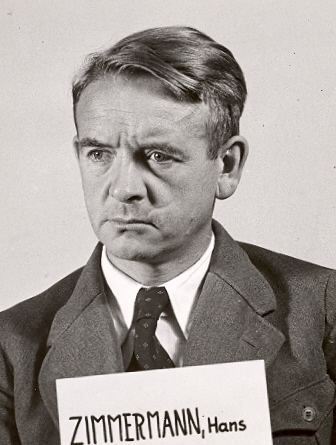

Gauleiter of Gau Franconia
- Acting
- In office 16 February 1940 – 4 April 1942
- Preceded by: Julius Streicher
- Succeeded by: Karl Holz

Kreisleiter of Nuremberg
- In office 16 July 1934 – 17 April 1945

Personal details
- Born: 18 October 1906 Nuremberg, Kingdom of Bavaria, German Empire
- Died: 17 February 1984 (aged 77) Bayreuth, Bavaria, West Germany
- Party: Nazi Party
- Occupation: Mechanical Engineer

Military service
- Allegiance: Nazi Germany
- Branch/service: German Army (1935–1945)
- Years of service: 1942–1943
- Battles/wars: World War II

Hans Zimmermann (18 October 1906 – 17 February 1984) was a German mechanical engineer who became a Nazi Party official. He served as a local and county leader before becoming the acting Gauleiter of Gau Franconia between February 1940 and April 1942. He attained the rank of SA-Oberführer in the Sturmabteilung (SA), the Nazi paramilitary unit. He was also a Reichstag deputy from 1940 to 1945, and served in the Wehrmacht during World War II.

== Biography ==
=== Early life ===
Born in Nuremberg, Zimmermann attended Volksschule and Realschule there through 1923. After a year-and-a-half as a trainee at Maschinenfabrik Augsburg-Nuernberg (MAN SE), he studied mechanical engineering at the Technische Hochschule Nürnberg and passed his state examination to become a mechanical engineer.

=== Nazi Party career ===
Zimmermann joined the Nazi Party on 11 November 1930 (membership number 377,977) and the Sturmabteilung (SA) at the same time. In Nuremberg, Zimmermann functioned from January 1931 through June 1933 as a Party leader in the St. Johannis section of the city, then as an Ortsgruppenleiter (local group leader) and from 16 July 1934 as a Kreisleiter (county leader). On 27 June 1933, he became managing director of the Allgemeine Ortskrankenkasse (AOK) a medical insurance company in Nuremberg, and from May 1939 to May 1945 he was the Director of the National Federation of Local Health Insurers. From May 1933 to 1935, he worked in the Stadtsrat (city council) of Nuremberg and from 1 October 1935 until May 1945 he was a Ratsherr (city councilor).

Between 16 February 1940 and 4 April 1942, Zimmermann served as acting Gauleiter of Franconia, after longtime Gauleiter Julius Streicher had been removed from this post for corruption. On 7 July 1940, he was made a member of the Reichstag (parliament) for electoral constituency 26, Franconia, and served there until the fall of the Nazi regime in May 1945. From 15 April 1942 to 27 November 1943, he took a temporary leave of absence from Party service to perform military service with the Wehrmacht, serving at an artillery weapons school in France. On 20 April 1943 he was promoted to SA-Oberführer.

On 1 January 1944 he resumed the leadership of the Nuremberg Kreis in the rank of Hauptbereichsleiter of the NSDAP. During the Battle of Nuremberg, he escaped from the city on 17 April 1945. Zimmermann underwent denazification procedures in Nuremberg, but not much else is known about his post-war life other than his death on 17 February 1984.

== See also ==
- Glossary of Nazi Germany
- List of Nazi Party leaders and officials
