= Julius Streicher =

German publicist and politician (1885–1946)

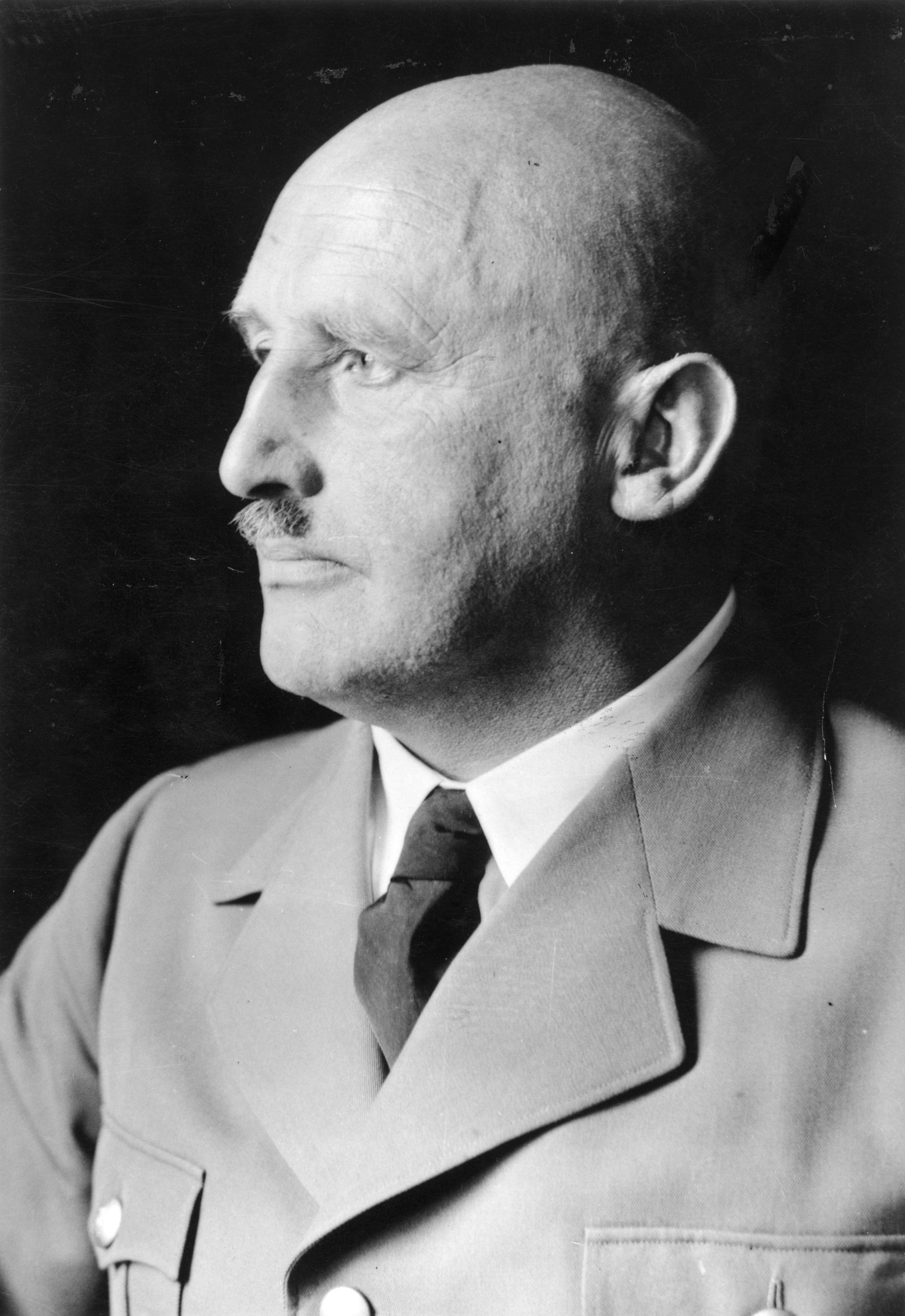
- Streicher in 1935

Gauleiter of Franconia
- In office 1 March 1929 – 16 February 1940
- Leader: Adolf Hitler
- Preceded by: Office established
- Succeeded by: Hans Zimmermann (acting, 1940); Karl Holz (acting from 1942, permanent from 1944)

Gauleiter of Nuremberg-Fürth
- In office 1 October 1928 – 1 March 1929
- Leader: Adolf Hitler
- Preceded by: Office established
- Succeeded by: Himself

Gauleiter of Nordbayern
- In office 2 April 1925 – 1 October 1928
- Leader: Adolf Hitler
- Preceded by: Office established
- Succeeded by: Himself

Publisher of Der Stürmer
- In office 20 April 1923 – 1 February 1945

Personal details
- Born: Julius Sebastian Streicher; 12 February 1885 Fleinhausen, Germany
- Died: 16 October 1946 (aged 61) Nuremberg, Germany
- Party: Nazi Party (1922–1945)
- Other political affiliations: DSP (1919–1921); DWG (1921–1922)
- Spouses: Kunigunde Roth (m. 1913; died 1943) Adele Tappe (m. 1945)
- Known for: Publisher of propaganda

Military service
- Allegiance: German Empire
- Branch/service: Imperial German Army
- Years of service: 1914–1918
- Rank: Leutnant
- Unit: 6th Bavarian Reserve Infantry Regiment
- Battles/wars: World War I
- Awards: Iron Cross
- Criminal information
- Status: Executed by hanging
- Conviction: Crimes against humanity
- Trial: Nuremberg trials
- Penalty: Death

Julius Sebastian Streicher (12 February 1885 – 16 October 1946) was a German publicist, politician, and convicted war criminal. A member of the Nazi Party, he served as the Gauleiter (regional leader) of Franconia and a member of the Reichstag, the national legislature. He was the founder and publisher of the virulently antisemitic newspaper Der Stürmer, which became a central element of the Nazi propaganda machine. The publishing firm made Streicher a multimillionaire.

After the war, Streicher was convicted of crimes against humanity during the Nuremberg trials. Specifically, he was found to have continued his vitriolic antisemitic propaganda when he was well aware that Jews were being murdered. For this, he was executed by hanging. Streicher was the first member of the Nazi regime held accountable for inciting genocide by the Nuremberg Tribunal.

== Early life ==
Streicher was born in Fleinhausen, in the Kingdom of Bavaria, one of nine children of the teacher Friedrich Streicher and his wife Anna (née Weiss). He worked as an elementary school teacher, as his father had. In 1913, Streicher married Kunigunde Roth, a baker's daughter, in Nuremberg. They had two sons, Lothar (born 1915) and Elmar (born 1918).

Streicher joined the German Army in 1914. For his outstanding combat performance during the First World War, he was awarded the Iron Cross 1st and 2nd Class, as well as earning a battlefield commission as an officer (lieutenant), despite having several reported instances of poor behaviour in his military record, and at a time when officers were primarily from aristocratic families. Following the end of World War I, Streicher was demobilised and returned to Nuremberg. Upon his return, Streicher took up another teaching position there but something unknown happened in 1919, which turned him into a "radical anti-Semite".

== Early politics ==
Streicher was heavily influenced by the endemic antisemitism found in pre-war Germany, especially that of Theodor Fritsch. In February 1919, Streicher became active in the antisemitic Deutschvölkischer Schutz- und Trutzbund (German Nationalist Protection and Defense Federation), one of the various radical-nationalist organizations that sprang up in the wake of the failed German Communist revolution of 1918. Such groups fostered the view that Jews and Bolsheviks were synonymous, and that they were traitors trying to subject Germany to Communist rule. In November 1919, Streicher joined the Deutschsozialistische Partei (German Socialist Party, DSP). This group's platform was close to that of the Nazi Party, or Nationalsozialistische Deutsche Arbeiter Partei (National Socialist German Workers' Party or NSDAP). The DSP had been created in May 1919 as an initiative of Rudolf von Sebottendorf as a child of the Thule Society, and its program was based on the ideas of the mechanical engineer Alfred Brunner (1881–1936); (Note: This system included socialist ideas, such as the takeover of the financial sector by the state, and the cutting-back of the "interest-based economy".) in 1919, the party was officially inaugurated in Hanover. Its leading members included Hans Georg Müller, Max Sesselmann and Friedrich Wiesel, the first two editors of the Münchner Beobachter. Julius Streicher founded his local branch in 1919 in Nuremberg.

By the end of 1919, the DSP had branches in Düsseldorf, Kiel, Frankfurt am Main, Dresden, Nuremberg and Munich. Streicher sought to move the German Socialists in a more virulently antisemitic direction—an effort which aroused enough opposition that he left the group and brought his now substantial following to yet another organisation in November 1921, the Deutsche Werkgemeinschaft (German Working Community, DWG); this group hoped to unite the various antisemitic völkisch movements. Meanwhile, Streicher's rhetoric against the Jews continued to intensify to such a degree that the leadership of the DWG thought he was dangerous and criticized him for his obsessive "hatred of the Jews and foreign races."

== Nazism ==
On 19 September 1922, Streicher left the DWG after less than one year and formally joined the Nazi Party on 8 October (membership number 17). He brought with him enough members to almost double the size of the Nazi Party overnight. He later claimed that because his political work brought him into contact with German Jews, he "must therefore have been fated to become later on, a writer and speaker on racial politics". (Note: According to Streicher, his dislike of Jews stemmed from an incident when he was five years old, during which he witnessed his mother weeping after claiming to have been cheated by the Jewish owner of a fabric shop.) He visited Munich in order to hear Adolf Hitler speak, an experience that he later said left him transformed. When asked about that moment, Streicher stated:

It was on a winter's day in 1922. I sat unknown in the large hall of the Bürgerbräuhaus... suspense was in the air. Everyone seemed tense with excitement, with anticipation. Then suddenly a shout. "Hitler is coming!" Thousands of men and women jumped to their feet as if propelled by a mysterious power ... they shouted, "Heil Hitler! Heil Hitler!" ... And then he stood on the podium ... Then I knew that in this Adolf Hitler was someone extraordinary ... Here was one who could wrest out of the German spirit and the German heart the power to break the chains of slavery. Yes! Yes! This man spoke as a messenger from heaven at a time when the gates of hell were opening to pull down everything. And when he finally finished, and while the crowd raised the roof with the singing of the "Deutschland" song, I rushed to the stage.

Nearly religiously converted by this speech, Streicher believed from this point forward that, "it was his destiny to serve Hitler".

In May 1923 Streicher founded the sensationalist newspaper Der Stürmer (The Stormer, or, loosely, The Attacker). From the outset, the chief aim of the paper was to promulgate antisemitic propaganda; the first issue had an excerpt that stated, "As long as the Jew is in the German household, we will be Jewish slaves. Therefore he must go." Historian Richard J. Evans describes the newspaper:

[Der Stürmer] rapidly established itself as the place where screaming headlines introduced the most rabid attacks on Jews, full of sexual innuendo, racist caricatures, made-up accusations of ritual murder, and titillating, semi-pornographic stories of Jewish men seducing innocent German girls.

=== Beer Hall Putsch ===
In November 1923, Streicher participated in Hitler's first effort to seize power, the failed Beer Hall Putsch in Munich. Streicher marched with Hitler in the front row of the would-be revolutionaries. For his part, Streicher was arrested, along with other key players that included Hermann Göring (who took a bullet), Wilhelm Frick, Ernst Pöhner, Max Amann, and Ernst Röhm. Streicher was also suspended from teaching. However, his loyalty to the cause earned him Hitler's lifelong trust and protection; in the years that followed, Streicher was one of the dictator's few true associates. Streicher, Rudolf Hess, Emil Maurice and Dietrich Eckart were the only Nazis mentioned in Mein Kampf; in the book, Hitler praised him for subordinating the German Socialist Party to the Nazi Party, a move Hitler believed was essential to the Nazis' success.

=== Continued activism ===
When the Nazi Party was banned in the aftermath of the failed coup attempt, Streicher in early 1924 joined the Greater German People's Community (Großdeutsche Volksgemeinschaft, GVG) a Nazi front organization established by Alfred Rosenberg. Streicher challenged Rosenberg's weak leadership and on 9 July 1924 was elected as Chairman of the GVG in his place. When Hitler was released from his prison sentence at Landsberg am Lech on 20 December 1924 for his role in the Putsch, Streicher was one of the few remaining followers waiting for him at his Munich apartment. Hitler – who would value loyalty and faithfulness very highly throughout his life – remained loyal to Streicher even when he landed in trouble with the Nazi hierarchy. Although Hitler would allow suppression of Der Stürmer at times when it was politically important for the Nazis to be seen as respectable, and although he would admit that Streicher was not a very good administrator, he never withdrew his personal loyalty.

In April 1924, Streicher was elected to the Bavarian Landtag (legislature), a position which gave him a margin of parliamentary immunity – a safety net that would help him resist efforts to silence his racist message. In January 1925 he also joined the Nuremberg City Council. Hitler re-founded the Nazi Party on 27 February 1925 in a speech at the Bürgerbräukeller in Munich. Streicher was present and pledged his loyalty; the GVG was soon formally disbanded. As a reward for Streicher's loyalty and dedication, on 2 April he was appointed Gauleiter of Nordbayern the Bavarian region that included Upper, Middle and Lower Franconia. He established his capital in his home town of Nuremberg. His jurisdiction would undergo several changes in the coming years. On 1 October 1928, it was significantly reduced to the area around Nuremberg-Fürth. On 1 March 1929, it again expanded, absorbing a neighboring Gau. Now encompassing all of Middle Franconia, it was renamed Gau Mittelfranken. Finally, in April 1933, the districts were consolidated and became simply Gau Franken. In the early years of the party's rise, Gauleiter were essentially party functionaries without real power; but in the final years of the Weimar Republic, as the Nazi Party grew, so did their power. Gauleiters such as Streicher wielded immense power and authority under the Nazi state.

== Rise of Der Stürmer ==
Beginning in 1924, Streicher used Der Stürmer as a mouthpiece not only for general antisemitic attacks, but for calculated smear campaigns against specific Jews, such as the Nuremberg city official Julius Fleischmann, who worked for Streicher's nemesis, mayor Hermann Luppe. Der Stürmer accused Fleischmann of stealing socks from his quartermaster during combat in World War I. Fleischmann sued Streicher and disproved the allegations in court, where Streicher was fined 900 marks. (Note: The slanderous attacks continued, and lawsuits followed. Like Fleischmann, other outraged German Jews defeated Streicher in court, but his goal was not necessarily legal victory; he wanted the widest possible dissemination of his message, which press coverage often provided. The rules of the court provided Streicher with an arena to humiliate his opponents, and he characterized the inevitable courtroom loss as a badge of honor.) Der Stürmer's official slogan, Die Juden sind unser Unglück (the Jews are our misfortune), was deemed non-actionable under German statutes, since it was not a direct incitement to violence.

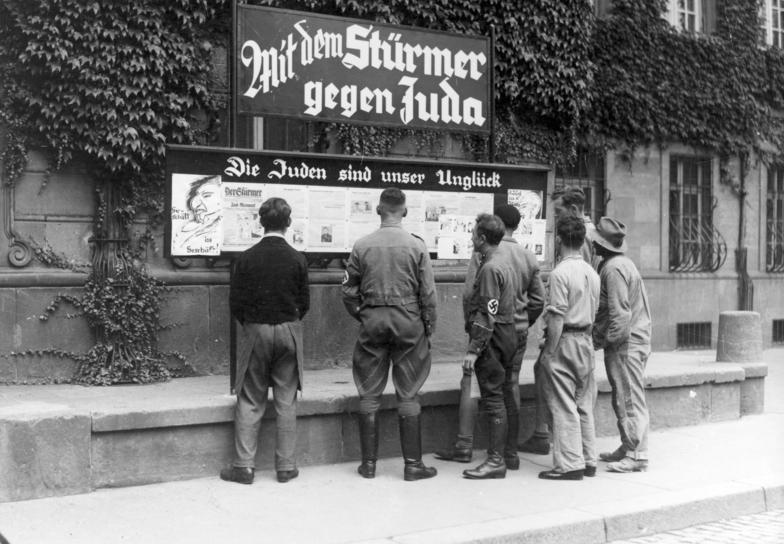
Public reading of Der Stürmer, Worms, 1933

Streicher's opponents complained to authorities that Der Stürmer violated a statute against religious offense with his constant promulgation of the "blood libel" – the medieval accusation that Jews killed Christian children to use their blood to make matzoh. Streicher argued that his accusations were based on race, not religion, and that his communications were political speech, and therefore protected by the German constitution.

Streicher orchestrated his early campaigns against Jews to make the most extreme possible claims, short of violating a law that might get the paper shut down. He insisted in the pages of his newspaper that the Jews had caused the worldwide Depression, and were responsible for the crippling unemployment and inflation which afflicted Germany during the 1920s. He claimed that Jews were white-slavers responsible for Germany's prostitution rings. Real unsolved killings in Germany, especially of children or women, were often confidently explained in the pages of Der Stürmer as cases of "Jewish ritual murder".

One of Streicher's constant themes was the sexual violation of ethnic German women by Jews, a subject which he used to publish semi-pornographic tracts and images detailing degrading sexual acts. The fascination with the pornographic aspects of the propaganda in Der Stürmer was an important feature for many antisemites. With the help of his cartoonist Phillip "Fips" Rupprecht, Streicher published image after image of Jewish stereotypes and sexually charged encounters. His portrayal of Jews as subhuman and evil is considered to have played a critical role in the dehumanization and marginalization of the Jewish minority in the eyes of common Germans – creating the necessary conditions for the later perpetration of the Holocaust. (Note: Streicher also combed the pages of the Talmud and the Old Testament in search of passages potentially depicting Judaism as harsh or cruel. In 1929, this close study of Jewish scripture helped convict Streicher in a case known as "The Great Nuremberg Ritual Murder Trial." His familiarity with Jewish text was proof to the court that his attacks were religious in nature; Streicher was found guilty and imprisoned for two months. In Germany, press reaction to the trial was highly critical of Streicher; but the Gauleiter was greeted after his conviction by hundreds of cheering supporters, and within months Nazi Party membership surged to its highest levels yet.) To protect himself from accountability, Streicher relied on Hitler's protection. Hitler declared that Der Stürmer was his favorite newspaper, and saw to it that each weekly issue was posted for public reading in special glassed-in display cases known as "Stürmerkasten". The newspaper reached a peak circulation of 600,000 in 1935. One of the possible solutions to the Nazi's perceived problem Streicher mentioned in the pages of Der Stürmer was transporting Jews to Madagascar.

Streicher's publishing firm also released three antisemitic books for children, including the 1938 Der Giftpilz (translated into English as The Toadstool or The Poisonous Mushroom), one of the most widespread pieces of propaganda, which warned about the supposed dangers Jews posed by using the metaphor of an attractive yet deadly mushroom. Late in 1936 Streicher also issued Trust No Fox on his Green Heath and No Jew on his Oath, an infamously antisemitic children's picture book by the 18-year-old Elvira Bauer. In the book the Jews are depicted as "children of the devil" and Streicher as the great educator and a hero of all German children.

Streicher did not limit his vituperative attacks to Jews themselves but also launched them against those he perceived as insufficiently hostile towards Jews. For example, he dismissed Mussolini as a Jewish lackey for not being antisemitic enough. Between 1935 and the end of the Second World War, upwards of 6,500 people were identified and denounced in Der Stürmer for not being sufficiently antisemitic.

== Streicher in power ==
In July 1932, Streicher was elected as a deputy of the Reichstag from electoral constituency 26, Franconia, a seat that he would hold throughout the Nazi regime. Following the August 1932 World Jewish Congress meeting in Geneva, Streicher declared that the Protocols of the Elders of Zion had been realized and that Jews controlled the government of Franz von Papen.

In April 1933, after Nazi control of the German state apparatus gave the Gauleiters enormous power, Streicher organised a one-day boycott of Jewish businesses which was used as a dress-rehearsal for other antisemitic commercial measures. As he consolidated his hold on power, he came to more or less rule the city of Nuremberg and his Gau Franken, and boasted that every Jew had been removed from Hersbruck. Among the nicknames provided by his enemies were "King of Nuremberg" and the "Beast of Franconia." Because of his role as Gauleiter of Franconia, he also gained the nickname of Frankenführer. In June 1933, Streicher predicted the death of all German Jews if a war occurred.

Streicher became a member of the SA on 27 January 1934 with the rank of SA-Gruppenführer and was promoted to SA-Obergruppenführer on 9 November 1937. On 6 September 1935, Hitler named him to the Academy for German Law. The New York Times decried this action with the headline: "Reich Honors Streicher. Anti-Semitic Leader is Named to Academy for German Law."

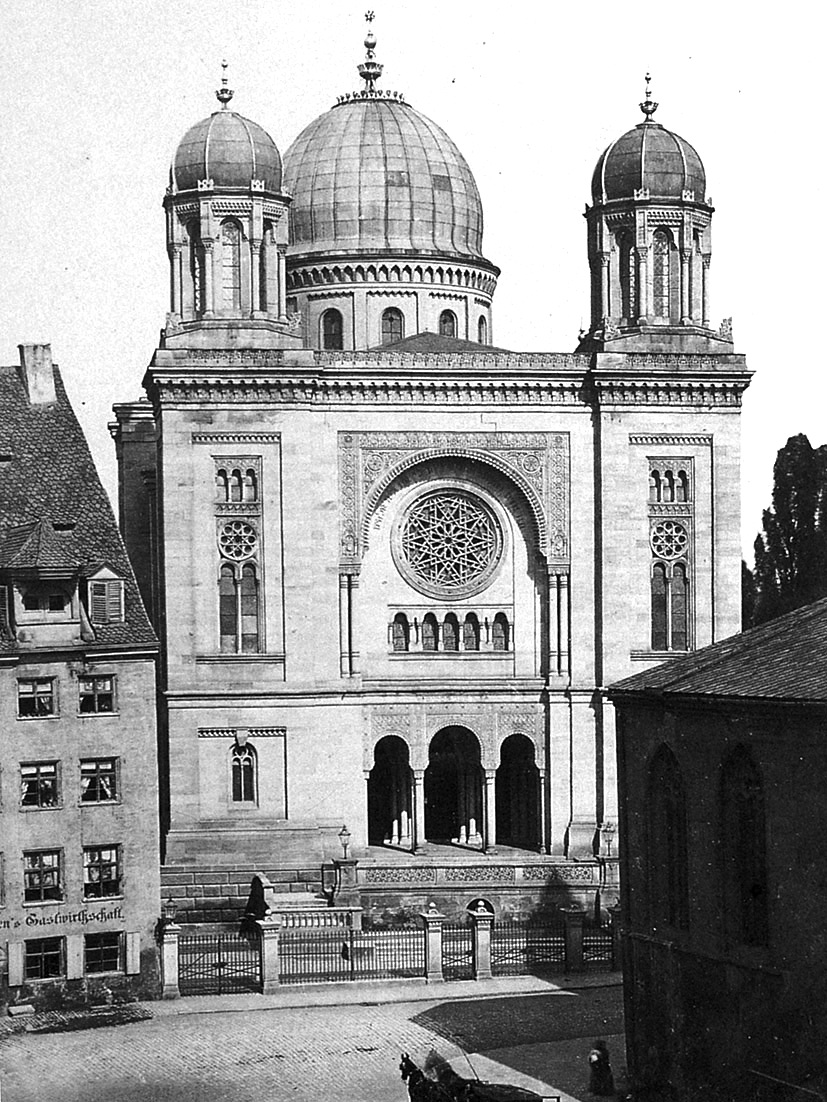
The Grand Synagogue of Nuremberg was built in 1874, and was ordered destroyed in 1938 by Julius Streicher – supposedly because he disapproved of its architecture – as part of what came to be known as Kristallnacht.

Streicher later claimed that he was only "indirectly responsible" for passage of the anti-Jewish Nuremberg Laws of 1935, and that he felt slighted because he was not directly consulted. Perhaps epitomizing the "profound anti-intellectualism" of the Nazi Party, Streicher once opined that, "If the brains of all university professors were put at one end of the scale, and the brains of the Führer at the other, which end do you think would tip?"

Streicher was ordered to take part in the establishment of the Institute for the Study and Elimination of Jewish Influence on German Church Life, that was to be organized together with the German Christians, the Ministry of Public Enlightenment and Propaganda, the Reich Ministry of Education and the Reich Ministry of the Churches. A surgical operation prevented Streicher from participating fully in this endeavor. This antisemitic standpoint concerning the Bible can be traced back to the earliest time of the Nazi movement, for instance Dietrich Eckart's (Hitler's early mentor) book Bolshevism from Moses to Lenin: A Dialogue Between Adolf Hitler and Me, where it was claimed that "Jewish forgeries" had been added to the New Testament.

In August 1938, Streicher ordered that the Grand Synagogue of Nuremberg be destroyed as part of his contribution to Kristallnacht. Streicher later claimed that his decision was based on his disapproval of its architectural design, which in his opinion "disfigured the beautiful German townscape."

== Fall from power ==
Author and journalist John Gunther described Streicher as "the worst of the anti-Semites", and his excesses brought condemnation even from other Nazis. Streicher's behaviour was viewed as so irresponsible that he was embarrassing the party leadership; chief among his enemies in Hitler's hierarchy was Reichsmarschall Hermann Göring, who loathed him and later claimed that he forbade his own staff to read Der Stürmer.

Despite his special relationship with Hitler, after 1938 Streicher's position began to unravel. He was accused of keeping Jewish property seized after Kristallnacht in November 1938; he was charged with spreading untrue stories about Göring – such as alleging that he was impotent and that his daughter Edda was conceived by artificial insemination; and he was confronted with his excessive personal behaviour, including unconcealed adultery, several furious verbal attacks on other Gauleiters and striding through the streets of Nuremberg cracking a bullwhip. (Note: Streicher's characteristic behaviour is portrayed in the 1944 Hollywood film The Hitler Gang.) He was brought before the Supreme Party Court and judged to be "unsuitable for leadership." On 16 February 1940, he was stripped of his party offices and withdrew from the public eye, although he was permitted to retain the title of a Gauleiter, and to continue publishing Der Stürmer. Hitler remained committed to Streicher, whom he considered a loyal friend, despite his unsavory reputation. (Note: Streicher was a poet, whose work was described as "quite attractive", and he painted watercolours as a hobby. He had a strong sexual appetite, which occasionally got him into trouble with the Nazi hierarchy.) Streicher's wife, Kunigunde Streicher, died in 1943 after 30 years of marriage.

When Germany surrendered to the Allied armies in May 1945, Streicher said later, he decided not to commit suicide. Instead, he married his former secretary, Adele Tappe. Days later, on 23 May 1945, Streicher was captured in the town of Waidring, Austria, by a group of American officers led by Major Henry Plitt of the 101st Airborne Division. (Note: At first Streicher claimed to be a painter named "Joseph Sailer", but, misunderstanding Plitt's poor German, he came to believe the latter already knew who he was, and quickly admitted his identity.)

== Trial and execution ==
8 October 1946 newsreel of Nuremberg Trials sentencing

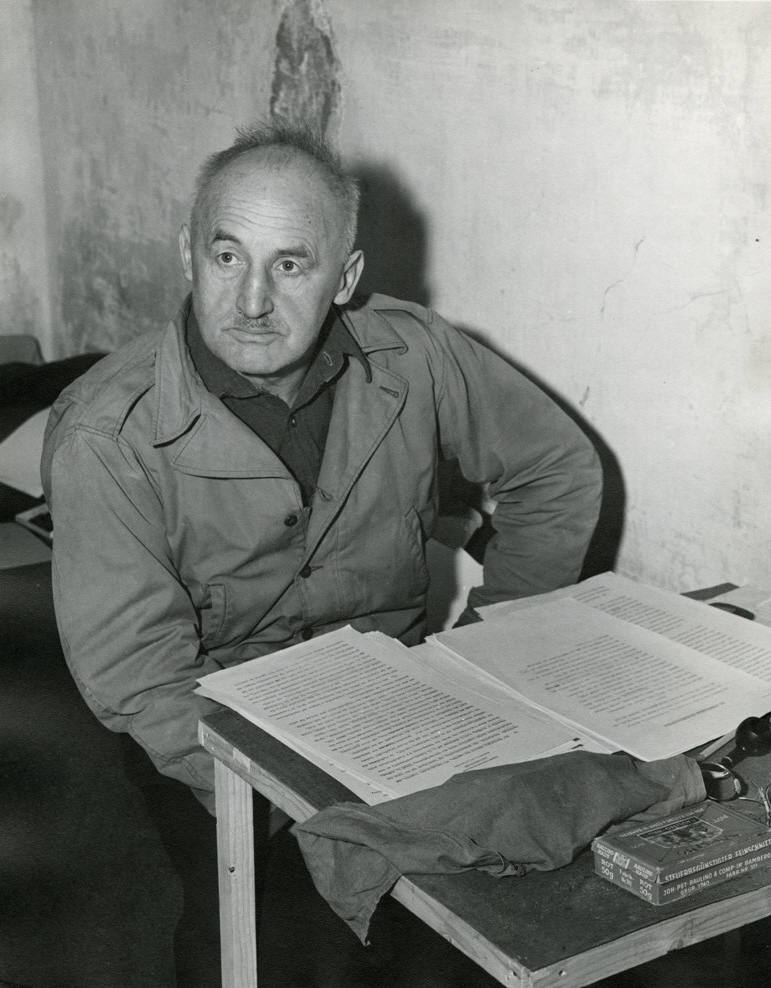
Julius Streicher in his cell in November 1945

During his trial, Streicher claimed that he had been mistreated by Allied soldiers after his capture. He was examined by Chief Medical Officer Lt. Col. Rene Juchli who reported that Streicher had partial paralysis of his left leg as a result of an old skiing injury. When the German version of the Wechsler-Bellevue IQ test was administered by Gustave Gilbert, Streicher had an above average IQ (106), yet still the lowest among the defendants. Streicher was not a member of the military and did not take part in planning the Holocaust, or the invasion of other nations. Yet his actions during the war were significant enough, in the prosecutors' judgment, to include him in the trial of Major War Criminals before the International Military Tribunal – which sat in Nuremberg, where Streicher had once been an unchallenged authority. He complained throughout the process that all his judges were Jews.

While at Nuremberg, Streicher was shunned by his fellow Nazi defendants. While Der Stürmer reveled in semi-pornographic propaganda accounts of Jews and non-Aryans sexually attacking German women, Streicher himself was an avid consumer of pornography. Researchers for the prosecution at Nuremberg, Joseph Maier and Sender Jaari, wrote, "Streicher was without a doubt the dirtiest man in Nuremberg. His collection of pornographic literature was the largest we have ever seen." His crudity and reputation as a sadist, rapist, and pornographer led his fellow prisoners to refuse to speak to or eat with him. While at Mondorf prison, Admiral Karl Dönitz even submitted a petition to the warden that Streicher be banned from the common table at mealtimes. Nuremberg psychiatrist Douglas Kelley also noted Streicher's obsession with "the Jewish problem". "Twenty four hours a day, his every thought, his every action bore some reference to his beliefs."

Most of the evidence against Streicher came from his numerous speeches and articles over the years. In essence, prosecutors contended that Streicher's articles and speeches were so incendiary that he was an accessory to murder, and therefore as culpable as those who actually ordered the mass extermination of Jews. They further argued that he kept up his antisemitic propaganda even after he was aware that Jews were being slaughtered.

Streicher was acquitted of crimes against peace, but found guilty of crimes against humanity, and sentenced to death on 1 October 1946. The judgment against him read, in part:

For his 25 years of speaking, writing and preaching hatred of the Jews, Streicher was widely known as "Jew-Baiter Number One." In his speeches and articles, week after week, month after month, he infected the German mind with the virus of anti-Semitism, and incited the German people to active persecution. [...] Streicher's incitement to murder and extermination at the time when Jews in the East were being killed under horrible conditions clearly constitutes persecution on political and racial grounds in connection with war crimes, as defined by the Charter, and constitutes a crime against humanity.

He, along with Hans Fritzsche, were the first people to be indicted for what would later be classified as incitement to genocide. Fritzsche was acquitted at trial.

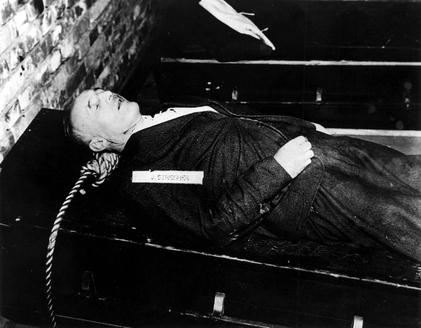
The body of Julius Streicher after being hanged, 16 October 1946

During his trial, Streicher displayed for the last time the flair for courtroom theatrics that had made him famous in the 1920s. He answered questions from his own defense attorney with diatribes against Jews, the Allies, and the court itself, and was frequently silenced by the court officers. He cited the works of businessman Theodore Kaufman, who called for the genocide of Germans by mass sterilization, as justification for his antisemitism. He also peppered his testimony with references to passages of Jewish texts that he also cited in the pages of Der Stürmer.

Streicher was hanged at Nuremberg Prison in the early hours of 16 October 1946, along with the nine other condemned defendants from the first Nuremberg trial. Göring, Streicher's nemesis, had committed suicide only hours earlier. Streicher's was the most melodramatic of the hangings carried out that night. At the bottom of the scaffold he cried out "Heil Hitler!". When he mounted the platform, he delivered his last sneering reference to Jewish scripture, snapping "Purimfest!" Streicher's final declaration before the hood went over his head was, "The Bolsheviks will hang you one day!" Joseph Kingsbury-Smith, a journalist for the International News Service who covered the executions, (Note: See the LA Times article commemorating Kingsbury-Smith at: J. Kingsbury-Smith; Honored Journalist) said in his filed report that after the hood descended over Streicher's head, he said "Adele, meine liebe Frau!" ("Adele, my dear wife!").

The consensus among eyewitnesses was that Streicher did not receive a quick death from spinal severing. As with at least several others, the bungled hanging was caused by the hangman, Master Sergeant John C. Woods.

Streicher's body, along with those of the other nine executed men and the corpse of Hermann Göring, was cremated at Ostfriedhof (Munich) and the ashes were scattered in the Isar River.

== In literature ==
Streicher is portrayed in detail as a criminal psychopath in Philip Kerr's detective novel The Pale Criminal (1990).

== In film ==
- Streicher was portrayed by Alexander Granach in the 1944 film The Hitler Gang.
- Streicher was portrayed by Theodore Marcuse in the 1962 film Hitler.
- Streicher was portrayed by Dieter Riesle in the 2025 film Nuremberg.

== See also ==
- Genocide justification
