= Gabelbach =

Gabelbach or Gäbelbach may refer to:

- Gabelbach (Zusmarshausen), a district of the municipality Zusmarshausen, Bavaria, Germany
- Gabelbach (Ilm), a river of Thuringia, Germany, tributary of the Ilm
- Gäbelbach, a tower block in the district Bümpliz-Oberbottigen of the city Bern, Switzerland
