= Karl Holz (Nazi) =

German Nazi Party politician (1895–1945)

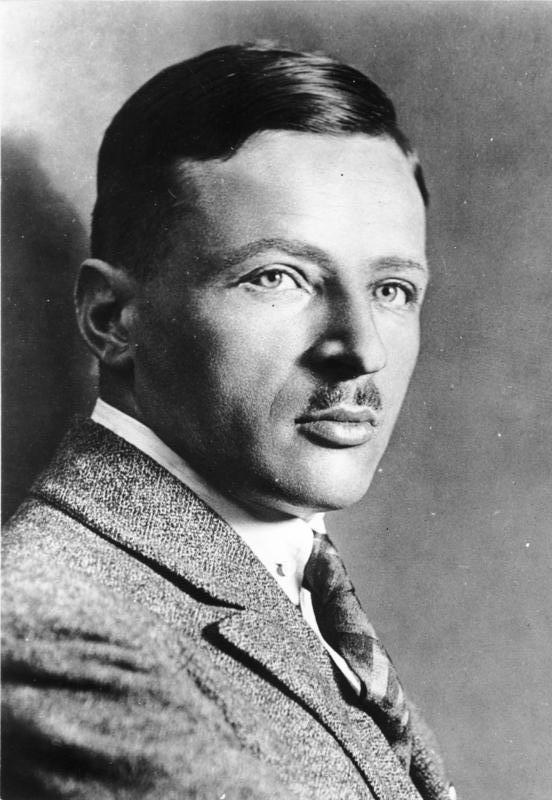

Gauleiter of Gau Franconia
- In office December 1944 – 20 April 1945
- Preceded by: Himself
- Succeeded by: Office abolished
- Acting Gauleiter of Gau Franconia
- In office 4 April 1942 – December 1944
- Preceded by: Hans Zimmermann
- Succeeded by: Himself

Deputy Gauleiter of Gau Franconia
- In office 1 January 1934 – 20 April 1940

Personal details
- Born: 27 December 1895 Nuremberg, German Empire
- Died: 20 April 1945 (aged 49) Nuremberg, Nazi Germany
- Party: Nazi Party
- Other political affiliations: German Socialist Party

Military service
- Allegiance: German Empire; Nazi Germany
- Branch/service: Imperial German Army; Sturmabteilung
- Years of service: 1915–1918
- Rank: Gruppenführer
- Unit: Reserve-Infanterie-Regiment 16; Infanterie-Regiment 144; Infanterie-Regiment 79; Jäger-Regiment 2
- Battles/wars: World War I: Western Front; World War II: Battle of Nuremberg †

Karl Holz (27 December 1895 – 20 April 1945) was a German Nazi Party politician. He was Gauleiter of Gau Franconia and rose to the rank of Gruppenführer in the Sturmabteilung (SA).

== Early years ==
He was born the fifth child of a heliographer, also named Karl Holz. He finished Volksschule and an apprenticeship as a salesman, working thereafter as a clerk. During World War I, Holz served in a number of Prussian units between 1915 and 1918: Reserve-Infanterie-Regiment 16, Infanterie-Regiment 144, Infanterie-Regiment 79, and Jäger-Regiment 2 on the Western Front. He sustained a number of wounds. After the war ended, he returned in September 1919 and took a job as an official in Nuremberg, but eventually was discharged due to his political activities. In 1920 he joined the German-Socialist Party (Deutschsozialistische Partei). In 1921 its chairman, Julius Streicher joined the Nazi Party (NSDAP), bringing with him enough members of the German-Socialist Party to almost double the size of the NSDAP overnight.

== Nazi career ==
Holz officially joined the Nazi Party on 11 November 1922 and his membership number was 77. Holz also joined the Sturmabteilung (SA). Quite early on, Holz established a close relationship with Streicher. In 1924, Holz was elected to the Nuremberg City Council, serving till 1932 and eventually serving as leader of the Nazi faction. Between 1927 and 1933, he held the post of editor of Der Stürmer, Streicher's anti-Semitic weekly newspaper. He advanced to editor-in-chief during the years 1933 and 1938. Holz boasted many penalties for political crimes (by his own count 17, and among those 5 prison sentences). In 1929, the Gauleiter office in Upper Franconia, went to the Bayreuth Kreisleiter Hans Schemm, despite Streicher's support for Holz. In 1932, Holz was elected to the Bavarian Landtag. From 1933 to July 1934, Holz served as NSDAP Kreisleiter of Nuremberg City. At the November 1933 parliamentary election, he was elected to the Reichstag from electoral constituency 26 (Franconia) and retained this seat until the fall of the Nazi regime.

As of 1 January 1934, Holz became Deputy Gauleiter to Streicher in Gau Franconia. In November he was promoted to the rank of SA-Brigadeführer. However, on 20 April 1940, in connection with the Streicher irregularities involving the Aryanization of Jewish assets, Holz was temporarily stripped of all his offices.

== World War II ==
He was called up for military service with Panzer Regiment 25 and saw combat in France, being severely wounded in June 1940. He also served in the Russian campaign the next year.

On 4 April 1942, he was returned to party service, becoming the Acting Gauleiter in Franconia, in succession to Hans Zimmermann. On 9 November 1942, he was promoted to the rank of SA-Gruppenführer. On 16 November 1942, he was appointed the Reich Defense Commissioner for his Gau. Finally, in December 1944, Hitler appointed Holz as the permanent Gauleiter for Franconia.

Holz led the defense of Nuremberg with Wehrmacht and Volksturm troops. After American troops of the 3rd Infantry Division had all but taken Nuremberg on 18 April 1945, Holz barricaded himself in the Palmenhofbunker at the Nuremberg Police Presidium along with a small group, among whom was the city's mayor, Willy Liebel. It has been alleged that Holz shot Liebel in the Palmenhofbunker owing to the latter's efforts to surrender the city to put a stop to the fighting, and because of the longstanding rivalry between the two men over control of the local Nuremberg Nazi Party. However, Oberst Richard Wolf, a senior Wehrmacht commander present in the police bunker, stated that Liebel died by a self-inflicted gunshot. In legal proceedings to determine the cause of Liebel's death in 1956, a German court determined that it was suicide. Holz met his own end in the same place on 20 April – coincidentally Hitler's 56th birthday – but whether it was suicide or an injury sustained in the battle is unknown.

== Sources ==
- Evans, Richard J. (2003). The Coming of the Third Reich. New York: Penguin. ISBN 0-14-303469-3.
- Fest, Joachim (1974). Hitler. New York: Harcourt Brace Jovanovich Inc. ISBN 0-15-141650-8.
- Miller, Michael D.; Schulz, Andreas (2012). Gauleiter: The Regional Leaders of the Nazi Party and Their Deputies, 1925-1945. Vol. I (Herbert Albrecht – H. Wilhelm Huttmann). R. James Bender Publishing. ISBN 978-1-932970-21-0.
- Rees, Laurence (2017). The Holocaust: A New History. New York: PublicAffairs. ISBN 978-1-61039-844-2.
