= Grand Synagogue of Nuremberg =

Former Reform Jewish synagogue in Germany

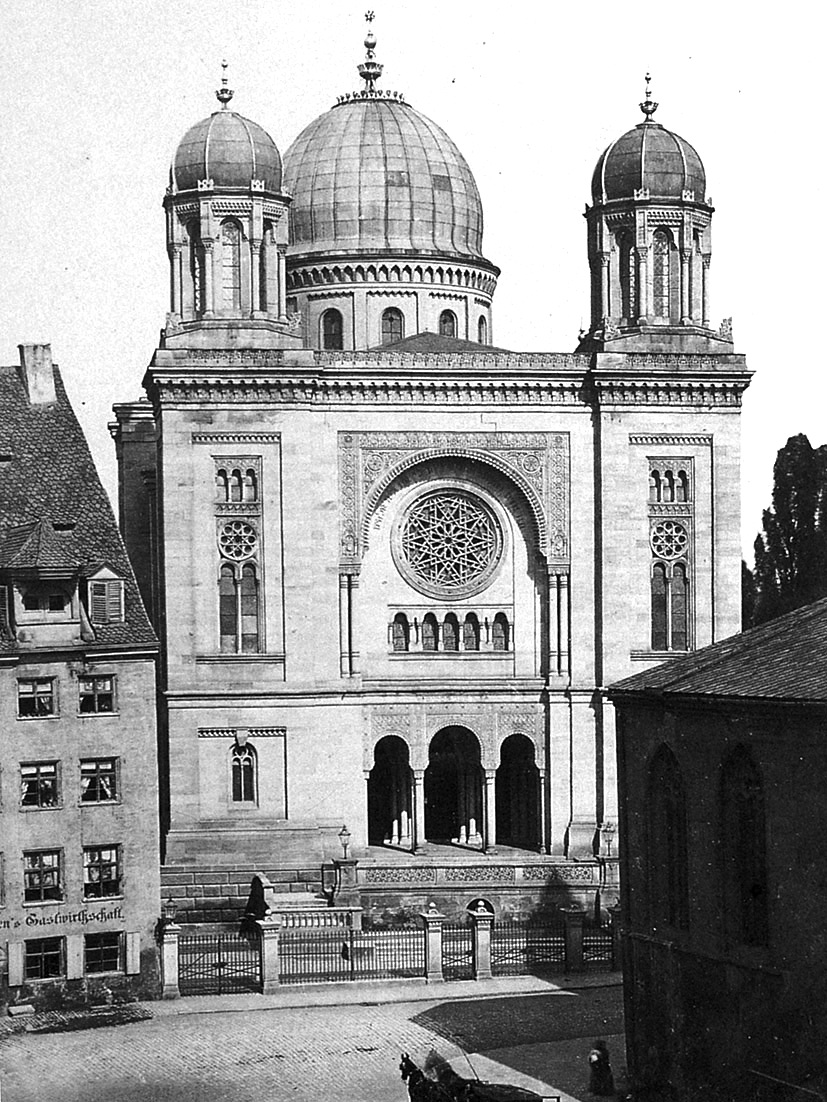
- The former synagogue, photograph taken between 1874 and 1909

- Location of the former synagogue in Bavaria

Religion
- Affiliation: Reform Judaism (former)
- Rite: Nusach Ashkenaz
- Ecclesiastical or organizational status: Synagogue (1874–1938)
- Status: Destroyed

Location
- Location: Hans-Sachs-Platz, Nuremberg (German: Nürnberg), Bavaria
- Country: Germany
- Interactive map of Grand Synagogue of Nuremberg
- Coordinates: 49°27′12″N 11°04′47″E

Architecture
- Type: Synagogue architecture
- Style: Moorish Revival
- Established: 1862 (as a congregation (Note: The earliest record of a Jewish presence in Nuremberg is dated 1112. Jewish communities were destroyed in Nuremberg in 1298 and again in 1349. All Jews were expelled from the city in 1499, and it was not until the 19th century that Jews re-established a presence.))
- Completed: 1874
- Construction cost: 46,000 florins
- Destroyed: 27 September 1938
- Capacity: 935 seats

The Grand Synagogue of Nuremberg was a former Reform Jewish congregation and synagogue, located in Nuremberg (German: Nürnberg), in the state of Bavaria, Germany.

Designed by Adolf Wolff in the Moorish Revival style, completed in 1874, and destroyed by Nazis on 27 September 1938, it was the third synagogue in Nuremberg.

== Previous synagogues in Nuremberg ==
The first medieval age synagogue stood on the site of today's Frauenkirche at the Hauptmarkt, and it was destroyed during the anti-Jewish pogroms of 1349. A second synagogue was located at the Wunderburggasse, and was destroyed in 1499 during another pogrom.

== Architecture and history ==
The synagogue, located at Hans-Sachs-Platz, connected elements of Christian church architecture with oriental decoration, and symbolized the integration of Jews into the city's society after a 400-year ban on Judaism. Also, the synagogue was cherished by tourists, and was called the Perle in der Silhouette und Zierde der Stadt ("pearl in the skyline and adornment of the town").

It was designed by Adolf Wolff (1832–1885) for the city's approximately 300 Jewish families at a cost of 46,000 florins. The first stone was installed in 1870, and the grand opening was on 8 and 9 September 1874, with the leaders of the area's various Christian communities attending. It had seating for 389 women and 546 men.

In 1875, an organ was installed. In 1886, Luitpold, Prince Regent of Bavaria, visited.

In September 1897, Wilhelm II, German Emperor, visited with his wife and two of his children. He met with the senior Rabbi, Dr. Ziemlich, and asked him about the city's Jewish community and compared the synagogue with another he had visited in Prague.

In August 1938, the synagogue was seized and destroyed on the orders of mayor Willy Liebel and Julius Streicher, the Gauleiter of Franconia, who stated that it was architecturally offensive. The process of destruction was interrupted by the Reichsparteitag and was only completed on 27 September 1938.

The community produced some of Germany's leading Reform scholars. In 1902, a smaller Orthodox synagogue was established in Nuremberg. It was also destroyed in 1938 during the Kristallnacht.

== Clergy ==
The following individuals have served as rabbi of the congregation:

Ordinal	Name	Term began	Term ended	Time in office	Notes
1	Dr. Moritz Lewin	1874	1880	5–6 years	Later became a leader of Berlin's Reform Judaism movement
2	Dr. Pincus Bernhard Ziemlich	1881	1907	25–26 years	
3	Dr. Max Freudenthal	1907	1934	26–27 years	
4	Dr. Isaak (Ernst) Heilbronn	1912	1939	26–27 years	Fled to the USA in 1939 and became a rabbi at Congregation Beth Hillel in New York

== Post-war era ==
After the war ended, the city of Nuremberg decided not to reconstruct the synagogue, in spite of the area being not overbuilt and available for construction work. Also, the winning entry of Nuremberg's 1947 architectural competition – intended to gather the best plans on how to rebuild the city – did not envision a synagogue on its original premises. Heinz Schmeißner, who won the prize, was also the city's official for surface construction from 1937 to 1945, and thus he also formally oversaw the destruction of the synagogue.

In 1984, a contemporary concrete synagogue and cultural centre was completed, located at Arno-Hamburger-Straße 3, in Nuremberg.

== Gallery ==
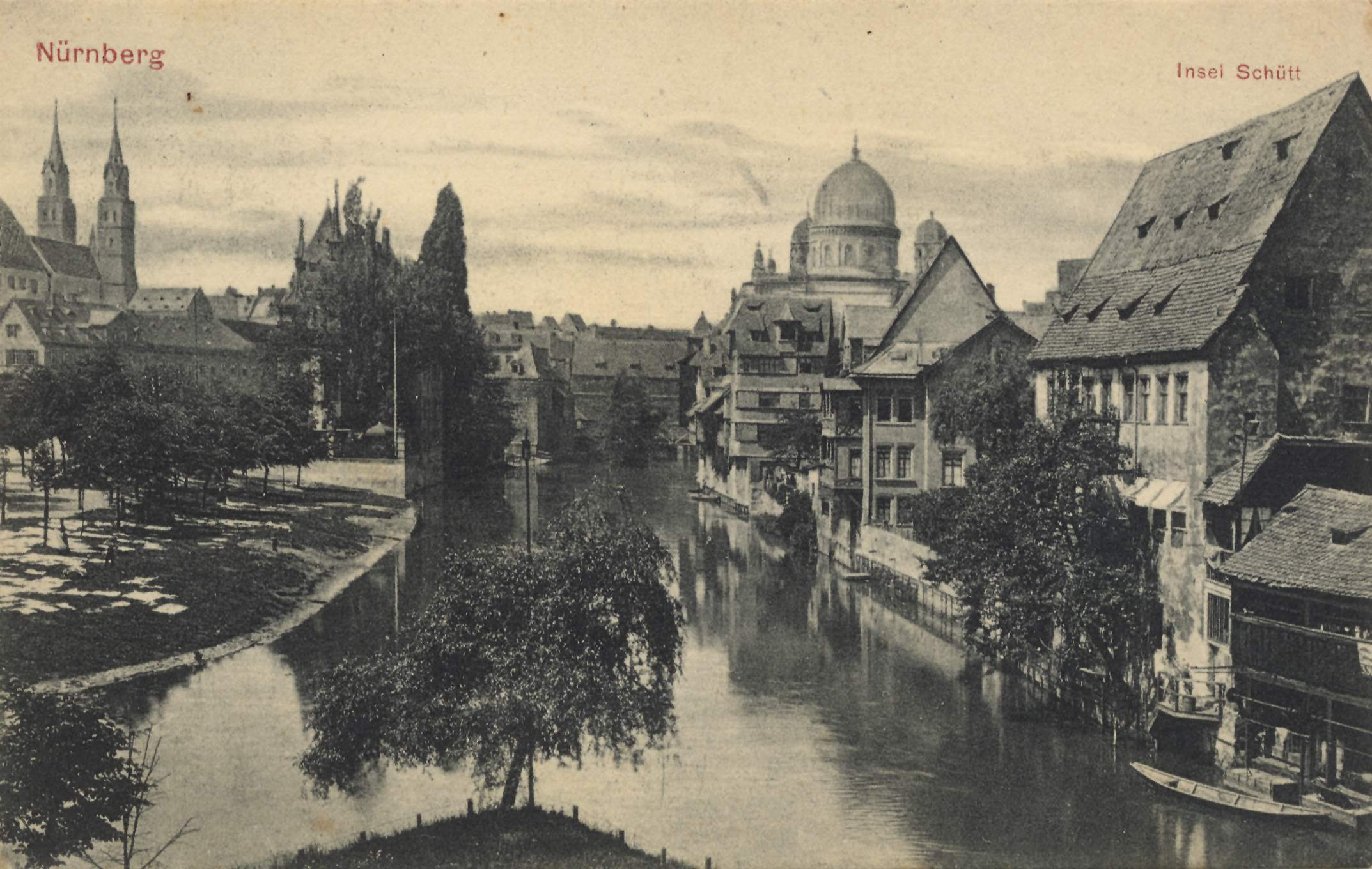
Postcard, 1900

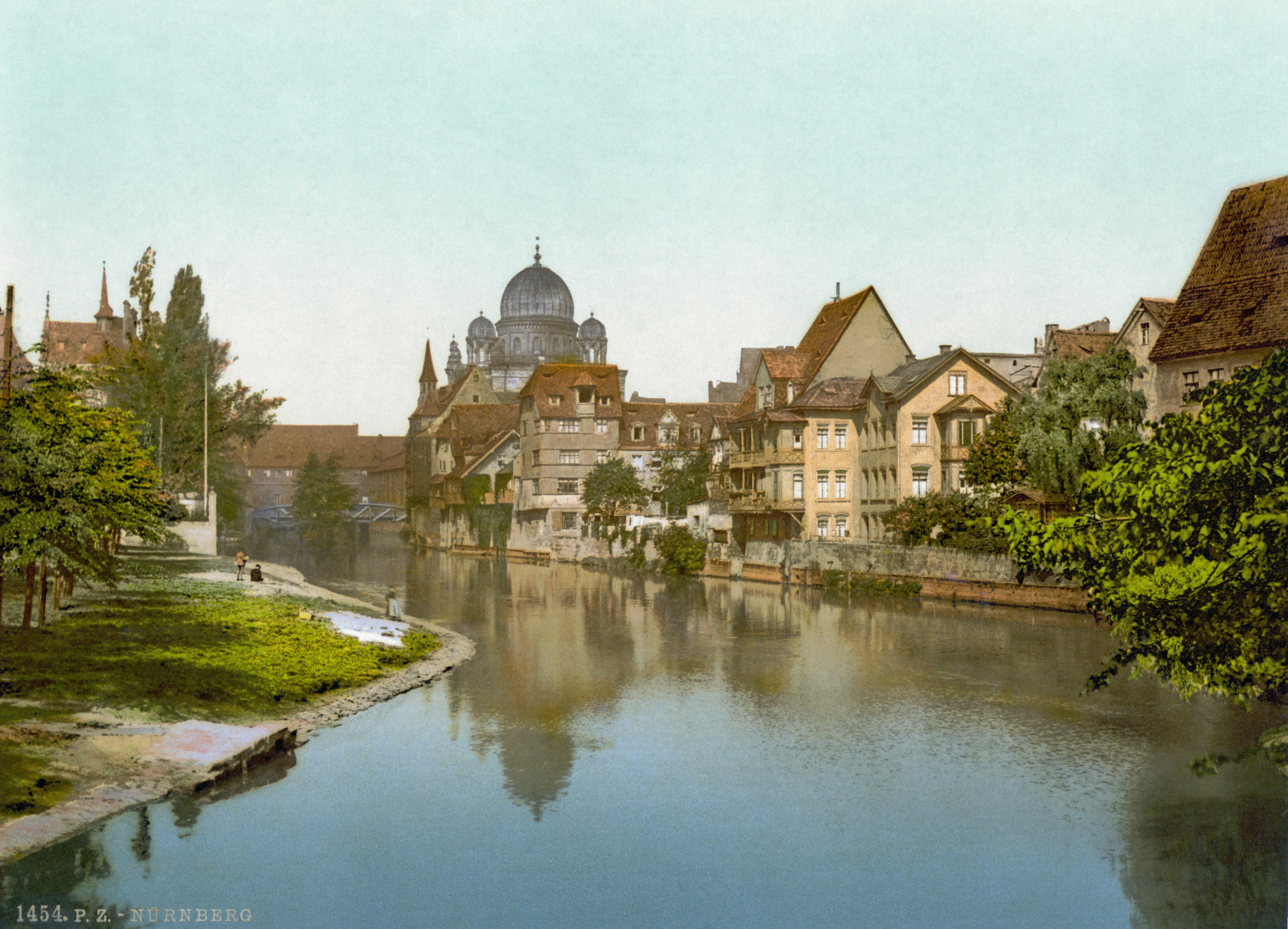
Photo from the Library of Congress, c. 1900

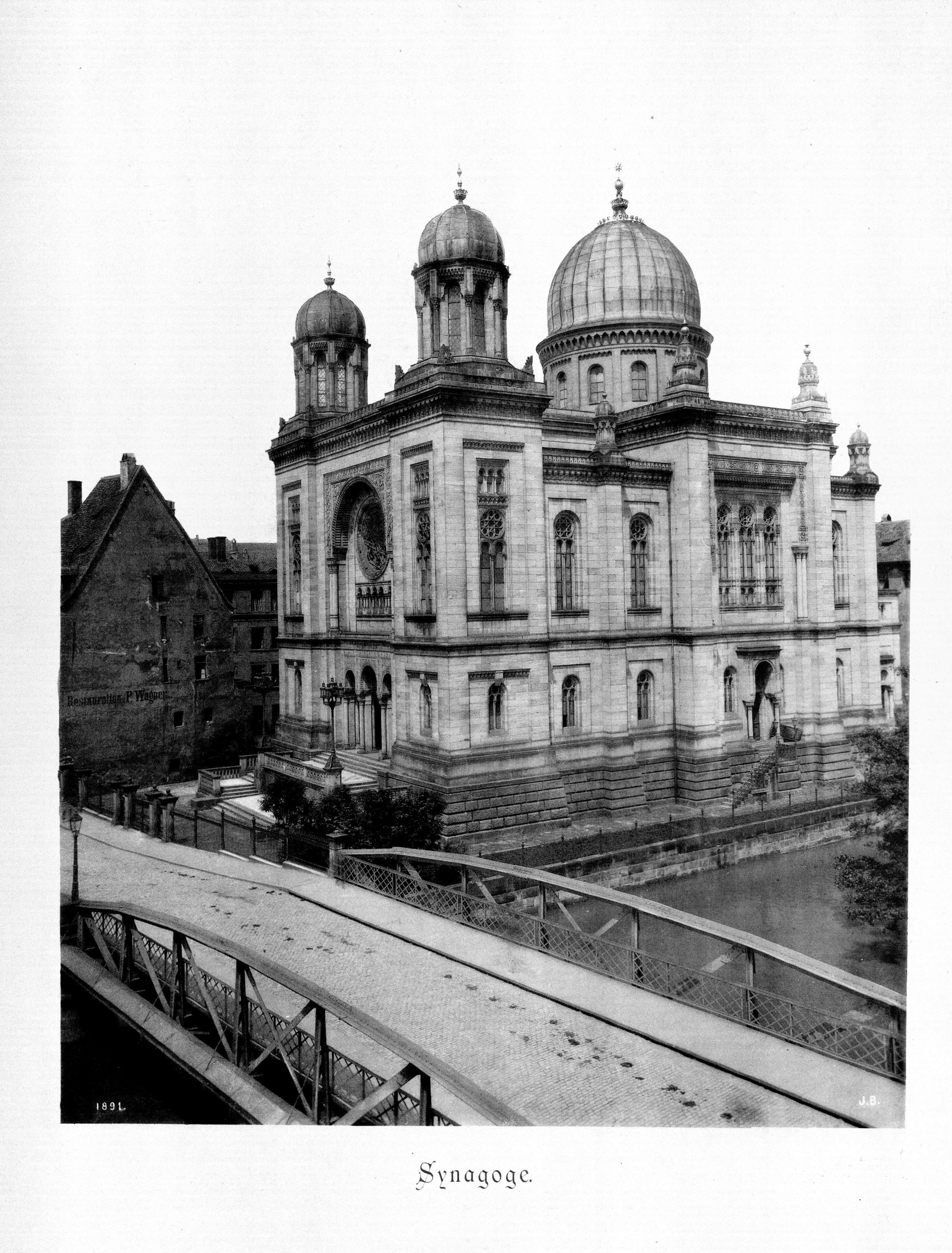
View from Pegnitz bridge (1891)

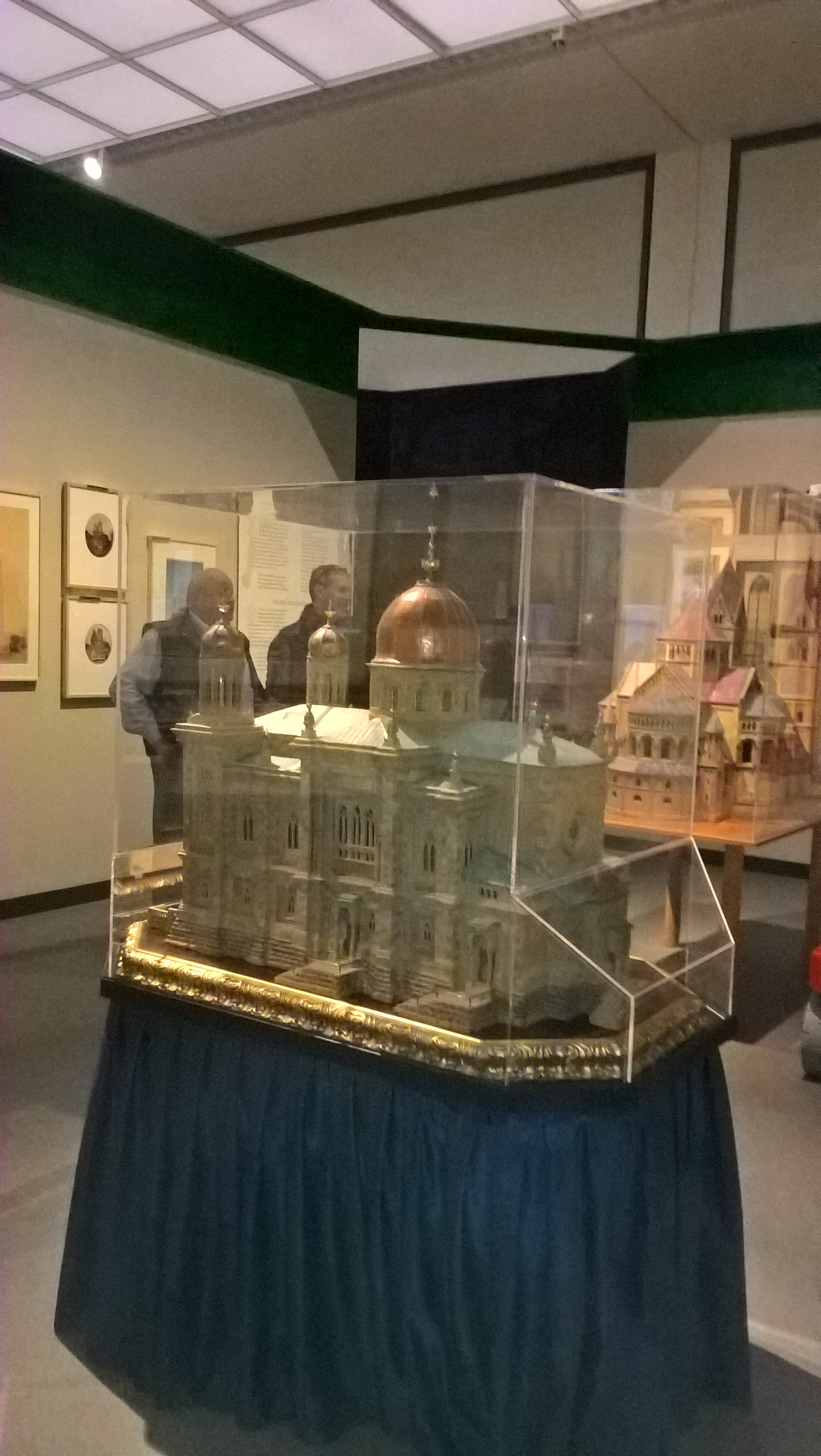
Model of the synagogue, from the Modern Pinakothek Museum in Munich, in 2018

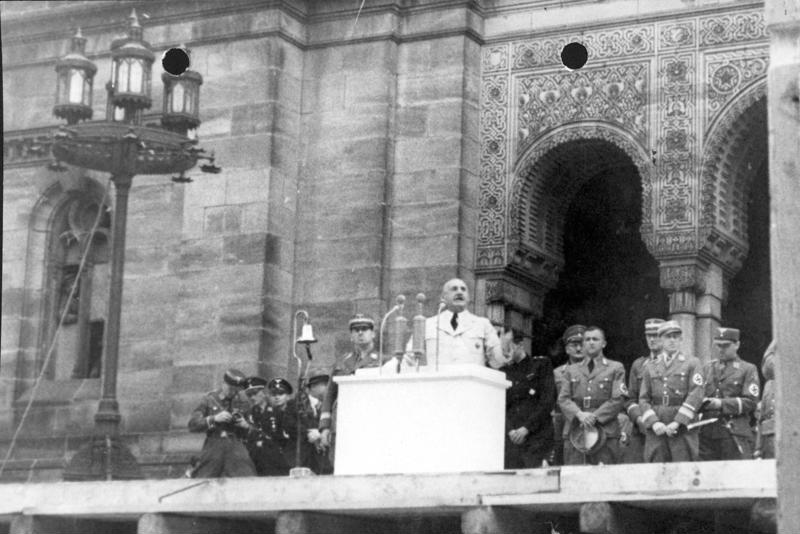
Julius Streicher speaking in front of the synagogue, August 10, 1938

== See also ==
- History of the Jews in Germany
- List of synagogues in Germany (in German)
