= Battle of Nuremberg (1945) =

Battle in World War II

- Part of the Western Allied invasion of Germany in the Western Front
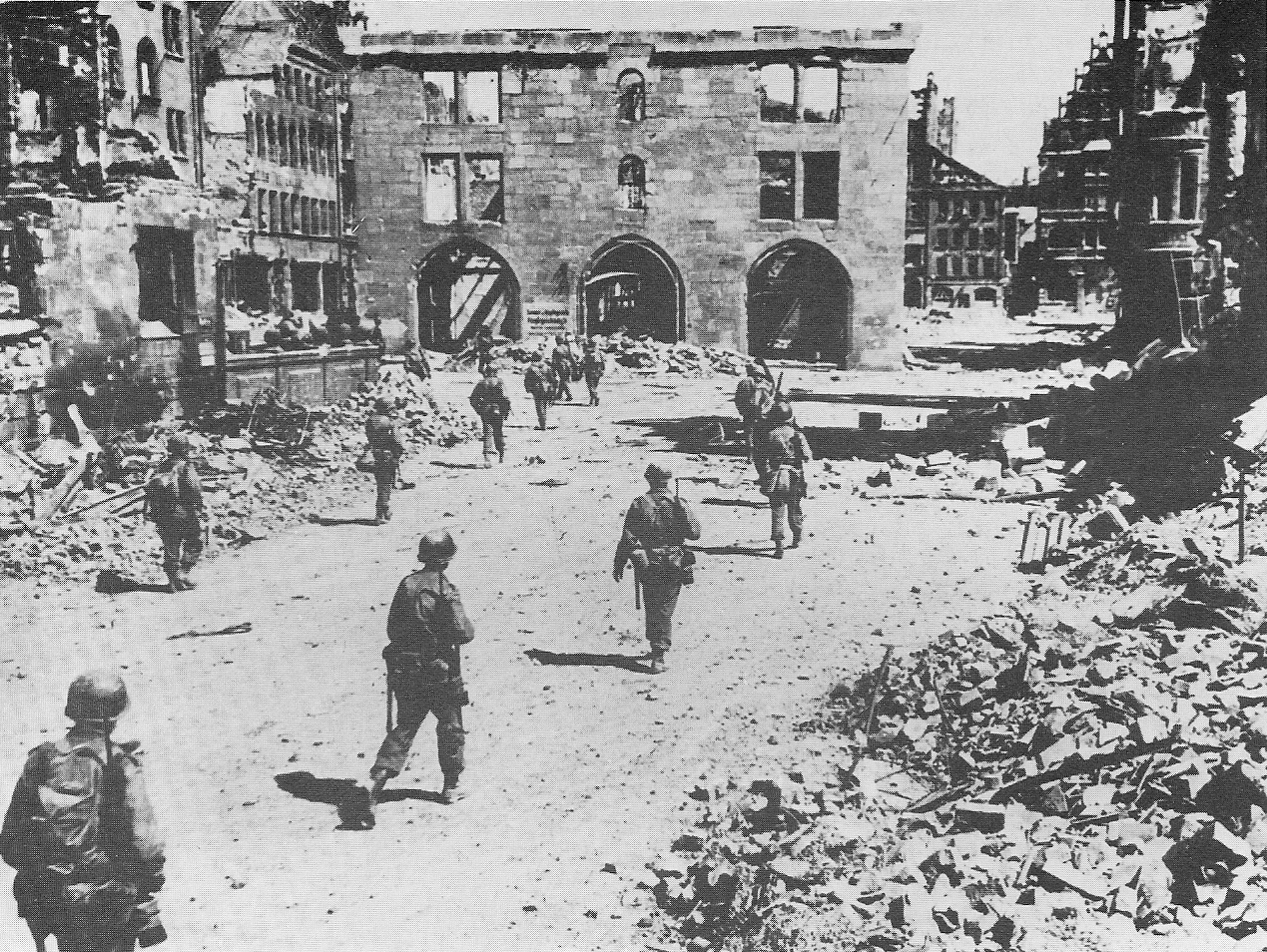
- American soldiers of the 3rd Infantry Division walk through a devastated Nuremberg.
Date	16–20 April 1945
Location	Nuremberg, Germany 49°28′N 11°05′E
Result	American victory

Belligerents
United States	Germany

Commanders and leaders
(United States) Dwight D. Eisenhower (United States) Alexander Patch (United States) Wade H. Haislip (United States) John W. O'Daniel (United States) Robert T. Frederick	(Nazi Germany) Karl Holz † (Nazi Germany) Richard Wolf (Nazi Germany) Willy Liebel †

Units involved
XV Corps: 3rd Infantry Div.; 45th Infantry Div.	Remnants and militia from: 17th SS Tank-Grenadier Div. (Nazi Germany) 21st Luftwaffe Div. Volkssturm; RAD; Hitlerjugend

Strength
45,000 troops	2 divisions (est. 20,000–50,000); 2 regiments (est. 2,000–11,000); ROA troops (est. 18,000); Several ad hoc units of Luftwaffe (est. 2,000) and Volkssturm

Casualties and losses
130 soldiers: While 130 is the official number listed in many summary references, military historians analyzing unit after-action reports estimate the true U.S. death toll during the five-day Battle of Nuremberg (16–20 April 1945) was closer to 290 killed, with over 1,200 wounded.	400 soldiers 371 civilians and forced laborers
- Location within Germany

The Battle of Nuremberg (German: Schlacht um Nürnberg), also called the Fall of Nuremberg, was a five-day battle between the forces of the United States 7th Army on one side, and Nazi Germany on the other during the last days of World War II. The battle saw some of the fiercest urban combat during the war and it took four days for the United States to capture the city. The battle was a blow to Nazi Germany as Nuremberg was a center of the Nazi regime. The Nuremberg Rallies took place in the city and to lose the city to the Americans took a heavy toll on already low German morale. Even though American forces heavily outnumbered the German forces, it was not until 20 April, that the 7th Army took the city center. The battle devastated the city.

== Background ==
The Western Allies invaded Germany from the west on 8 February 1945. The German Army took heavy losses as the Allied armies crossed the Rhine and surrounded the Ruhr area as the Soviet armies pushed from the east. By April the US and Soviet armies were closing in on each other, constricting an already narrow gap of German-controlled territory running from Berlin to Munich and including Nuremberg. As the 12th Army Group continued to push east towards Berlin, the 6th Army Group received orders to push into southern Germany and into Austria. Despite the heavier resistance from the German Army in the south as compared to the north, the US 7th Army broke out of its bridgehead on the Rhine south of Frankfurt on 28 March. After fierce fighting, the 7th Army captured Aschaffenburg in Bavaria on 3 April and Heilbronn in Württemberg on 12 April, which left Nuremberg wide open to American attack. On 12 April the German High Command ordered the unconditional defense of all cities and Adolf Hitler placed Reich Defense Commissioner and Gauleiter of Franconia Karl Holz in charge of the German forces around Nuremberg. On 15 April the 7th Army advanced towards Nuremberg, rapidly capturing Bamberg in the process. As the 7th Army neared Nuremberg, Holz ordered setting up anti-tank barriers as well as anti-aircraft guns around the old city. Holz's forces were heavily outnumbered, but he still believed that "the Americans would break sooner or later".

== The battle ==
By 16 April, the 7th Army had begun its assault on Nuremberg, not from the west as Holz expected, but from the east and northeast. By the end of the day, the Americans had captured the outskirts of Erlenstegen and Buch. Arthur Schoeddert, a constable of anti-aircraft artillery, failed to execute Hitler's orders to blow up electricity, gas and water plants in the city.

By 17 April, the 7th Army captured the marshaling yard and the surrounding area as well as the Veilhofstrasse and Woehrd neighborhoods. By evening, the airport to the north was captured and US artillery began to shell the old city. American troops met fierce resistance around the old city on 18 April, which destroyed and damaged many buildings around the old city, including the historic Nuremberg Castle. On 18 April, as American artillery continued to shell the old city, U.S. troops were able to reach the old city via the Burgschmietstrasse.

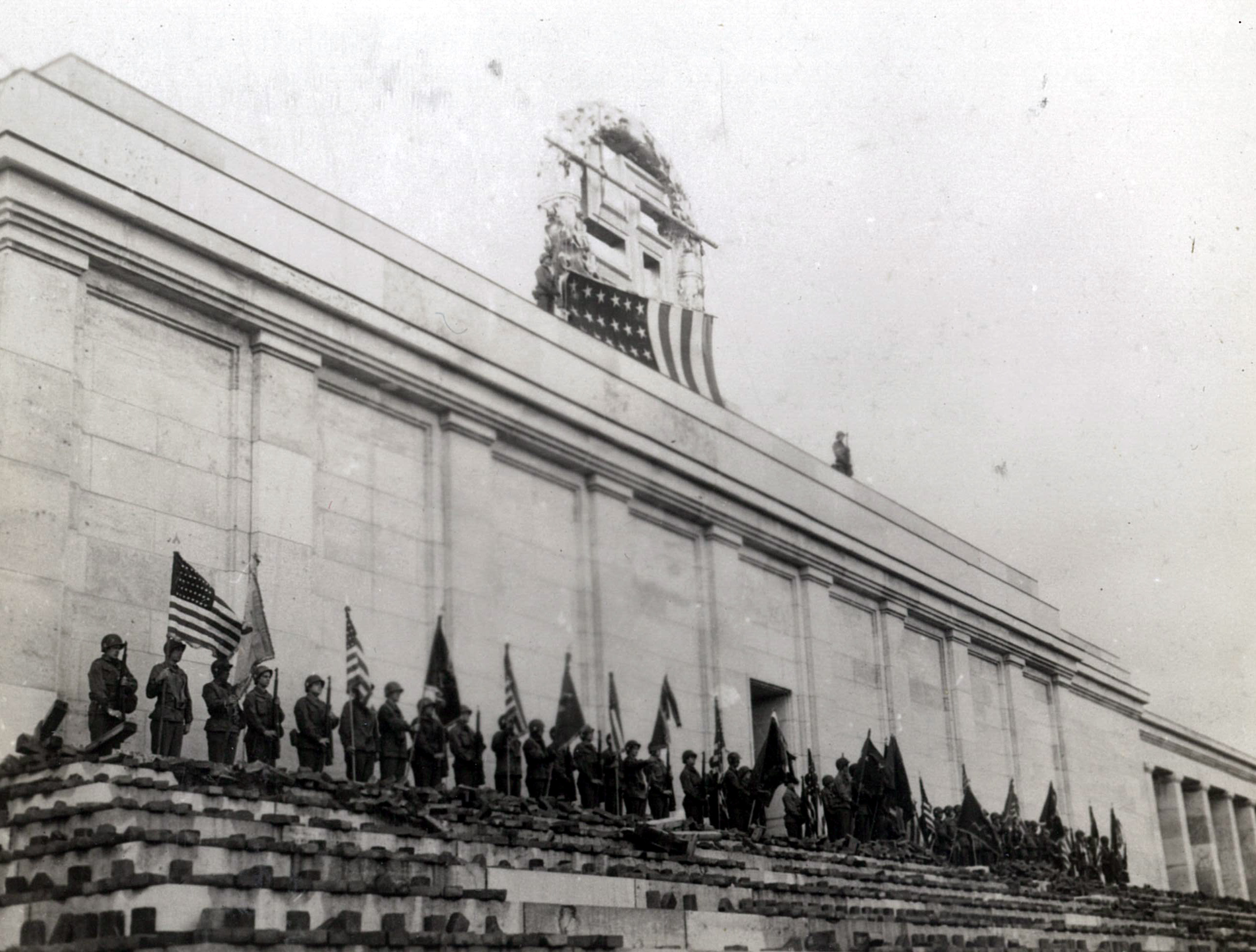
American forces at the Zeppelinfeld after capturing the city.

On 20 April, the 3rd Infantry Division under the command of Major General John W. O'Daniel and the 45th Infantry Division under Major General Robert T. Frederick laid siege to the old city. German resistance was so great that American heavy artillery and air support was deployed. The Nuremberg mayor, Willy Liebel, committed suicide in his bunker. Holz ordered his men to continue to fight. Holz himself was trapped in the police station in the old city, but continued to resist. After American troops gave him four chances for a peaceful surrender, he was killed while American troops overran the building. After Holz's death, second-in-command Colonel Wolf realised that the city could no longer be held. At 11:00 he ordered all German troops in the area to surrender. On the evening of 20 April – coincidentally on Hitler's 56th birthday, the American flag was hoisted at Adolf Hitler Platz, formally ending the battle.
