= Carl Dickel =

New Zealand cricketer (born 1946)

Personal information
- Full name: Carlson Richard Wellesley Dickel
- Born: 2 July 1946 (age 80); Dunedin, Otago, New Zealand
- Batting: Right-handed
- Bowling: Right-arm legbreak
- Role: Bowler

Domestic team information
- Years: Team
- 1970/71–1972/73: Otago
- 1970/71–1972/73: Canterbury
- 1980/81: Whanganui
- 1982/83: Otago
- Source: Cricinfo, 8 May 2016

Carlson Richard Wellesley Dickel (born 2 July 1946) is a New Zealand former sportsman and sports coach. He played and coached basketball in the country, including coaching national sides, and played first-class cricket for Otago and Canterbury.

Dickel was born at Dunedin in 1946 and educated at Otago Boys' High School. He played basketball for both the Otago and Canterbury representative sides during the 1960s and 70s and worked as a teacher and basketball coach, having success coaching at Logan Park High School in Dunedin where the girls' team won the national championships in 1985 and 1986 and the boys' team were runners-up three times. He was the coach of the New Zealand women's national basketball team for ten years, including at the 2000 Olympic Games in Sydney, an assistant coach for the men's side in 2007, and coached the Otago Nuggets for four seasons. One of his sons, Mark Dickel, played basketball for the national side whilst another son, Richard Dickel, is a basketball coach.

As well as basketball, Dickel played top-level cricket in New Zealand. Playing as a leg spin bowler, he played for Otago age-group sides from the 1966–67 season and made his first-class debut for the representative side in January 1971. After making seven first-class and one List A appearances for the side he played for Canterbury for two season between 1973–74 and 1974–75. After playing Hawke Cup cricket for Whanganui in 1980–81, he returned to play a final season of domestic cricket in 1982–83. In total Dickel made 21 first-class and five List A appearances, taking 53 first-class and five List A wickets.

In 2007 Dickel moved to live in Australia, living on the Gold Coast. He was made a life member of Basketball Otago in 2020.
