= Zusam =

River in Germany

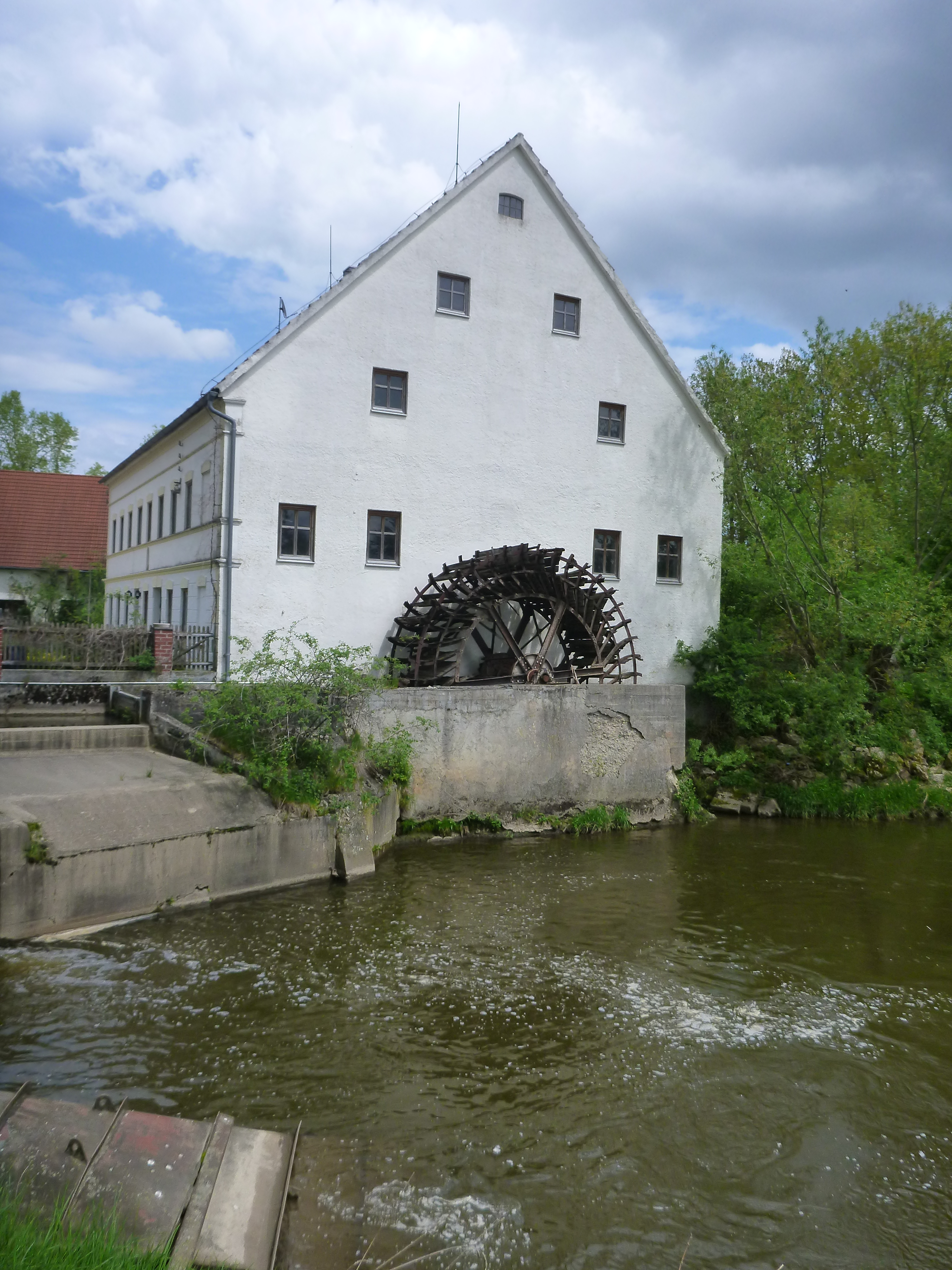
- The Zusam at Villenbach

- Mouth of the Zusam

Location
- Country: Germany
- State: Bavaria

Physical characteristics
- Source
  - location: Unterallgäu
- Mouth
  - location: Danube
  - coordinates: 48°42′35″N 10°47′39″E
- Length: 97.1 km (60.3 mi)
- Basin size: 576 km^{2} (222 sq mi)

Basin features
- Progression: Danube→ Black Sea

The Zusam (German pronunciation: [ˈtsuːzam]) is a river in Bavaria, Germany and a right tributary of the Danube. Its source is just north of the village of Könghausen, in the Unterallgäu district of Bavaria. It flows north for approximately 97 km, before converging into the Danube near the town of Donauwörth.

Towns and villages along the Zusam include Obergessertshausen, Memmenhausen, Muttershofen, Ziemetshausen, Dinkelscherben, Fleinhausen, Zusmarshausen, Zusamzell, Wertingen, Frauenstetten, and Buttenwiesen.

== See also ==
- List of rivers of Bavaria
