= Fleinhausen =

Village in Augsburg, Bavaria, Germany

Coordinates: 48°22′N 10°34′E

Fleinhausen is a village of the municipality of Dinkelscherben in the western part of the Bavarian district of Augsburg in Germany.

Located on the western bank of the Zusam River, Fleinhausen is approximately 3.7 km northwest of Dinkelscherben. Along with the nearby village of Grünenbaindt, has approximately 360 inhabitants.

== Notable residents ==
- Julius Streicher (1885-1946), prominent Nazi prior to World War II, founder and publisher of anti-Semitic Der Stürmer newspaper, executed for war crimes
