= Dickel (disambiguation) =

Dickel is a municipality in Germany. It may also refer to:

== People ==
- Dickel (surname), list of people with the surname

== Other ==
- George Dickel, brand of Tennessee whisky
