= Dinkelscherben =

- Municipality
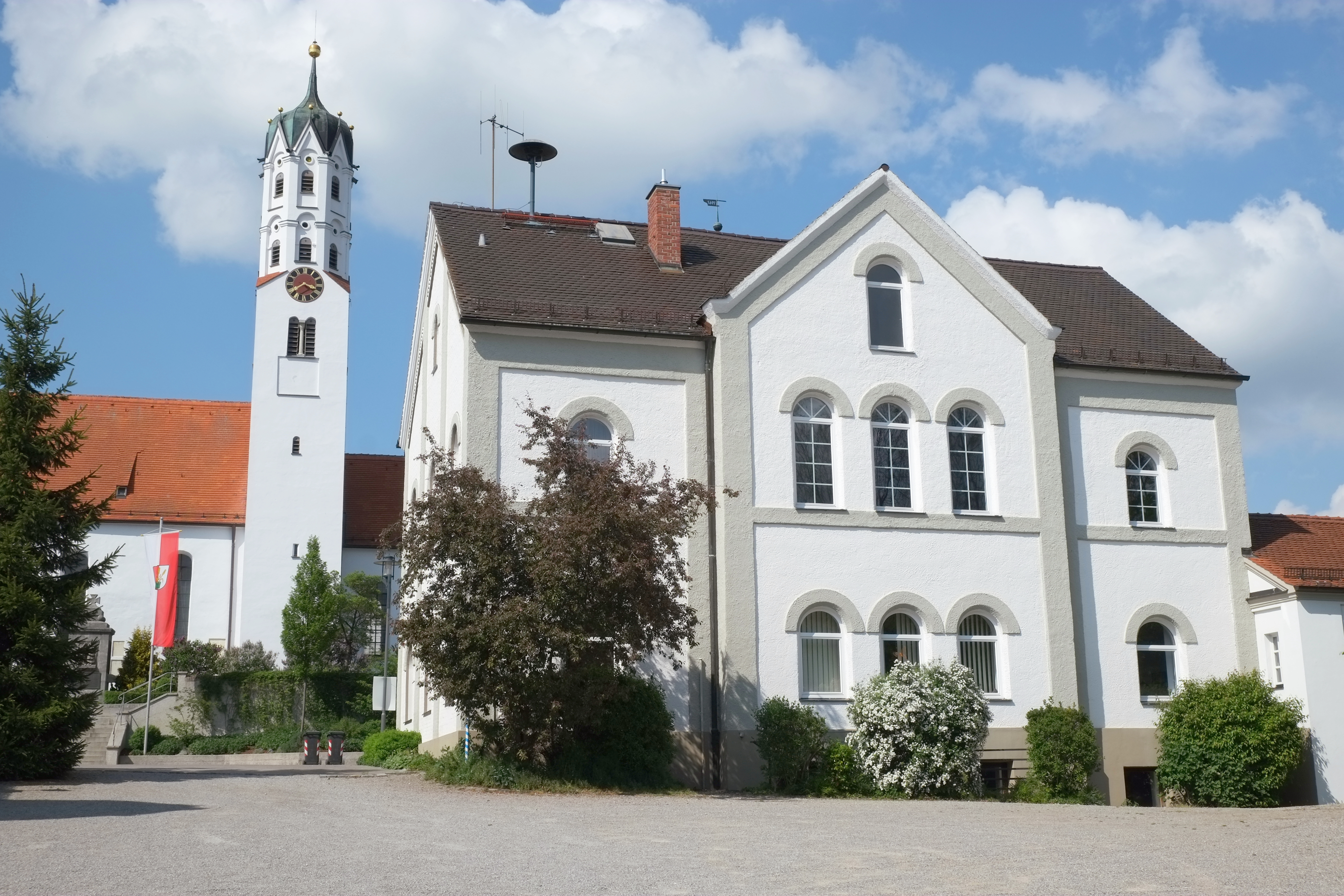
- Town hall

- Coat of arms

- Location of Dinkelscherben within Augsburg district
- Interactive map of Dinkelscherben
- Location within Germany Location within Bavaria
- Coordinates: 48°21′N 10°35′E
- Country: Germany
- State: Bavaria
- Admin. region: Schwaben
- District: Augsburg

Government
  - Mayor (2020–26): Edgar Kalb

Area
  - Total: 67.65 km^{2} (26.12 sq mi)
- Elevation: 460 m (1,510 ft)

Population (2025-12-31)
  - Total: 6,719
  - Density: 99.32/km^{2} (257.2/sq mi)
- Time zone: UTC+01:00 (CET)
  - Summer (DST): UTC+02:00 (CEST)
- Postal codes: 86424
- Dialling codes: 08292
- Vehicle registration: A
- Website: www.dinkelscherben.de

Dinkelscherben (German pronunciation: [ˈdɪŋkl̩ˌʃɛʁbn̩]) is a municipality in the district of Augsburg in Bavaria in Germany. Fleinhausen, Anried, Breitenbronn, Ettelried, Grünenbaindt, Häder, Lindach, Oberschöneberg and Ried are villages that make up the municipality of Dinkelscherben.

== Transport ==
Dinkelscherben is served by the Ulm-Augsburg railway.
