= Mark Dickel =

New Zealand-Australian basketball player and coach

Personal information
- Born: 21 December 1976 (age 49) Dunedin, Otago, New Zealand
- Listed height: 6 ft 2 in (1.88 m)
- Listed weight: 195 lb (88 kg)

Career information
- High school: Logan Park (Dunedin, New Zealand)
- College: UNLV (1996–2000)
- NBA draft: 2000: undrafted
- Playing career: 1993–2014
- Position: Point guard

Career history

Playing
- 1993–1996: Otago Nuggets
- 1998: Wellington Saints
- 2000: North Harbour Kings
- 2000–2002: Victoria Titans
- 2002: Wellington Saints
- 2002–2003: Fenerbahçe
- 2003: Otago Nuggets
- 2003: Telindus Oostende
- 2004: Fenerbahçe
- 2004–2005: Erdemirspor Belediyesi
- 2005–2006: Lokomotiv Rostov
- 2006–2007: WTK Anwil Włocławek
- 2007: Maroussi B.C.
- 2007–2008: Brose Baskets Bamberg
- 2008: Mutlu Akü
- 2009–2010: Trikala 2000 B.C.
- 2010–2011: Sydney Kings
- 2011: Southland Sharks
- 2012–2014: Otago Nuggets

Coaching
- 2015–2018: Canterbury Rams
- 2018–2020: TNT Katropa / TNT Tropang Giga (consultant)
- 2020: Philippines (interim)
- 2025–present: Utah Prep Academy

Career highlights
- Eurocup All-Star (2006); Turkish League assists leader (2005); NZNBL All-Star Five (2002); 2× NZNBL assist champion (1998, 2014); NZNBL Rookie of the Year (1993); Second-team All-Mountain West (2000); WAC Pacific Division Freshman of the Year (1997); NCAA assists leader (2000)

Mark Robert Dickel (born 21 December 1976) is a New Zealand basketball coach and former professional player.

== Early years ==
Dickel attended Logan Park High School in Dunedin, New Zealand. In 1993, he joined the Otago Nuggets of the New Zealand National Basketball League and played there until 1996, when he left for college in the United States.

In 1998, off-season, following the conclusion of his sophomore season, Dickel joined the Wellington Saints for the 1998 New Zealand NBL season.

== College career ==
Dickel played college basketball at the University of Nevada, Las Vegas, from 1996 to 2000, tying for the team lead in assists his freshman year of 1996–97 and leading the team in that category in his remaining three seasons. In his senior year of 1999–2000, his 9.0 assists per game led NCAA Division I men's basketball, and he finished his career third on the school's all-time list for total assists. In 2000, Dickel was named an Associated Press All-American.

== Professional career ==
After going undrafted in the 2000 NBA draft, Dickel returned to New Zealand and joined the North Harbour Kings for the last two games of the 2000 New Zealand NBL season. Later that year, he signed with the Victoria Titans for the 2000–01 and 2001–02 NBL seasons. In 2002, he re-joined the Wellington Saints for the 2002 New Zealand NBL season. Later that year, he signed with Fenerbahçe of Turkey for the 2002–03 season, where he led the league in assists with 5.6 per game. He then re-joined the Otago Nuggets for the 2003 NZNBL season.

In mid-2003, he signed with Telindus Oostende of Belgium for the 2003–04 season. In December 2003, he left Oostende. In January 2004, he re-joined Fenerbahçe for the rest of the 2003–04 season.

In mid-2004, he signed with Erdemirspor of Turkey for the 2004–05 season. In 24 games, he averaged 19.3ppg, 4.1rpg, and 8.7apg.

In 2005, he signed a two-year deal with Lokomotiv Rostov of Russia.

In August 2006, Dickel returned a positive drug test for cannabis use and was suspended by Basketball New Zealand for two matches against Qatar. FIBA imposed an additional 10-day suspension, meaning Dickel missed the first three matches of the 2006 FIBA World Championship. The suspension subsequently made Lokomotiv terminate the second year of his two-year contract, and in September 2006, he signed with WTK Anwil Włocławek of Poland for the 2006–07 season. In January 2007, he left Włocławek and signed with Maroussi B.C. of Greece. However, after just one game, he was forced to leave after a season-ending back injury.

In July 2007, Dickel signed with reigning German BBL champions Brose Baskets Bamberg. In January 2008, Dickel left Brose Baskets Bamberg following the end of Euroleague play and returned to Turkey, signing with Selçuk Üniversitesi BK for the rest of the 2007–08 season.

In January 2009, Dickel signed with the Trikala 2000 B.C. of Greece for the rest of the 2008–09 season. In 14 games, he averaged 7.1 points per game to help Trikala avoid relegation.

In December 2009, Dickel re-signed with Trikala for the rest of the 2009–10 season.

In November 2010, Dickel signed with the Southland Sharks for the 2011 New Zealand NBL season, which saw him play under his brother, Richard.

In December 2010, Dickel signed with the Sydney Kings for the rest of the 2010–11 NBL season. His debut with the Kings was delayed until 8 January 2011 due to a calf injury. On 30 January 2011, he tore his calf in the final quarter of a 94–91 away loss to the Gold Coast Blaze. He returned on 6 March 2011 and played a further five games.

In September 2011, Dickel signed a two-year deal with the Otago Nuggets. He also took up the role of Basketball Otago's director of development. In January 2014, he was appointed player-coach of the Nuggets for the 2014 season.

== Coaching career ==
Dickel was the head coach of the Albania national team from 2010 to 2011.

On 15 August 2014, Dickel was named the head coach of the Canterbury Rams, effectively ending his 21-year playing career after signing a two-year deal with the club. Dickel and his Mainland Eagles' staff coaches were able to facilitate US basketball scholarships to 10 players. On 29 April 2016, he signed a four-year contract extension with the club.

Following the 2018 season, he left the Rams and joined the PBA's TNT KaTropa coaching staff.

In January 2020, Dickel was named interim coach of the Philippine national team for the first window of the 2021 FIBA Asia Cup qualifiers.

On 27 May 2025, Dickel was announced as head coach of the basketball program at Utah Prep Academy in Hurricane, Utah.

== National team career ==
Dickel was first selected for the New Zealand national basketball team in 1994. In 1995, he was both junior and senior Tall Blacks player of the year. In 1997, he played in the World Under 23 championships in Melbourne and averaged 16 points and 6 assists, being recognised as a top-five player at the tournament.

He represented New Zealand in the 2000 Sydney Olympics and the 2004 Athens Olympics. He played in the 2002 FIBA World Championship, finishing the tournament ranked third in assists per game. Due to a drug suspension, he played only two matches in the 2006 FIBA World Championship.

Dickel played for the Tall Blacks for more than 100 games.

== Personal life ==
Dickel and his wife Ashley have three children: Jalen, Madden, and Boston.

Dickel's father, Carl, played first-class cricket for Otago and was the New Zealand women's national basketball team head coach for 10 years and coached the Otago Nuggets for four years from 1994 to 1997. Dickel's brother, Richard, is a basketball coach and has coached in New Zealand and Australia. Dickel's nephew, Luke Aston, also plays in the New Zealand NBL.

== See also ==
- List of doping cases in sport
