= Hélène R. Dickel =

American astronomer (born 1938)

Hélène Ramseyer Dickel
- Born: 1938 (age 87–88)
- Education: Mount Holyoke College, 1959, Mathematics University of Michigan, 1961 Master's and 1964 Ph.D. in Astronomy
- Occupation: Astronomer
- Years active: 1965-2018
- Employer: University of Illinois
- Known for: Co-discoverer of the first formaldehyde maser (1979)
- Spouse: John Dickel

Hélène R. Dickel (born 1938) co-discovered the first formaldehyde maser in May 1979. She made some of the first images of molecular distributions with the Westerbork Synthesis Radio Telescope in the Netherlands, the Very Large Array of Radio Telescopes of the National Radio Astronomy Observatory, and the millimeter array of the Berkeley-Illinois-Maryland Association (BIMA) for which she was the BIMA Scheduler from 1994 to 1998.

== Life and education ==
Dickel holds a bachelor's degree in Mathematics from Mount Holyoke College (1959), and earned her master's and Ph.D. in Astronomy from the University of Michigan in 1961 and 1964, respectively.

Hélène Dickel is married to fellow astronomer and University of Illinois professor, John R. Dickel.

== Work ==
From 1977 to 2001, Dickel was a research professor in Astronomy at the University of Illinois, Urbana-Champaign.

Early in her career, Dickel was a visiting fellow in radiophysics at the Commonwealth Science and Industrial Research Organization in New South Wales, Australia. In 1969, with J.H. Bieritz, and German astronomer Heinrich Wendker, Dickel published The Dickel, Wendker, Bieritz (DWB) Catalog; a list of 193 Hydrogen II regions contained within the Cygnus X star-forming region in the constellation Cygnus. The regions were uncovered through mapping H-alpha emissions. The three authors had all worked together at the Vermillion River Observatory near Danville, Illinois.

Dickel was a collaborator with the Los Alamos National Laboratory for almost a decade, and served as a visiting astronomer in the Netherlands and Australia. Additionally, Dickel has held positions at Sterrewacht te Leiden in the Netherlands from 1977-1979, Earth and Space Sciences Division of the Los Alamos Laboratory in New Mexico from 1985-1986, the Australia Telescope National Facility in Sydney, Australia from 1992-1993, the Netherlands Foundation for Research in Astronomy in Dwingeloo, and the Astronomical Institute of the University of Amsterdam.

In 2001, Dickel retired from U of I, and relocated to Albuquerque, New Mexico. She served as an adjunct professor in the Physics and Astronomy Department of the University of New Mexico, working on the Long Wavelength Array project from 2005-2018.

== Awards, honors, and memberships ==
- American Astronomical Society's Harlow Shapley Visiting lecturer, 1981-1992
- Dickel served in the American Chemical Society Speaker Service from 1986-2008
- Chair of the Nominating Committee of the American Astronomical Society in 1992
- Member of the organizing committee of Commission 40 on Radio Astronomy of the International Astronomical Union
- President of the IAU Commission 5 Working Group on Astronomical Designations from 1997-2003
- Dickel is a member of:
  - International Scientific Radio Union
  - Phi Beta Kappa
  - Sigma Xi
  - Association of Women in Science
- Received the Albert Nelson Marquis Lifetime Achievement Award in 2019

== Publications ==
- H.R. Dickel, H. Wendker, and J.H. Bieritz. 1969. "The Cygnus X Region: V. Catalogue and Distances of Optically Visible H II Regions", Astronomy and Astrophysics 1, 270-280.
- J.R. Forster, W.M. Goss, T.L. Wilson, D. Downes, and H.R. Dickel. 1980. "A Formaldehyde Maser in NGC7538", Astronomy and Astrophysics. Vol. 84 (1-2), p. L1-L3.
- H.R. Dickel and L.H. Auer. 1994. "Modeling radiative transfer in molecular clouds. 1: HCO(+) in the star-forming region W49A North. Astrophyiscal Journal, Part 1 Vol. 437, Issue 1.
- H.R. Dickel. 2016. "SMC 1 or What's in a Name?", Symposioum - International Astronomical Union. Volume 190: New Views of the Magellanic Clouds, 1999, pp. 17–18.
