= Richard Dickel =

New Zealand basketball coach

Personal information
- Born: 18 January 1975 (age 51)

Career information
- High school: Logan Park (Dunedin, New Zealand)
- Coaching career: 2010–present

Career history

Coaching
- 2010–2012: Southland Sharks
- 2013: Adelaide 36ers (assistant)
- 2013–2014: Adelaide Lightning
- 2014–2015: Adelaide 36ers (assistant)
- 2015–2016: Nidaros Jets
- 2017: Launceston Tornadoes
- 2019; 2021–2023: South Adelaide Panthers
- 2024: Norwood Flames

Richard Campbell Dickel (born 18 January 1975) is a New Zealand basketball coach.

== Early life ==
Dickel hails from Dunedin, New Zealand, where he attended Logan Park High School. He was part of the playing roster of the Otago Nuggets during the 2002 New Zealand NBL season.

== Coaching career ==
In 2006, Dickel moved from Dunedin to Invercargill to serve as Southland Basketball Association's first full-time development officer. He later became the association's operations and development manager and helped lobby for a national basketball team in Southland. He was named the inaugural head coach of the Southland Sharks, a team entering the New Zealand NBL in the 2010 season. He spent three seasons in charge of the Sharks, parting ways with the team following the 2012 season. The Sharks finished with a 5–11 record in 2012, their worst result since joining the NBL in 2010. He ended his tenure with Southland Basketball Association in January 2013.

In February 2013, Dickel moved to Adelaide, South Australia, where he joined the Adelaide 36ers of the Australian NBL. He began working with 36ers coach Joey Wright and assistant Kevin Brooks. He began the 2013–14 NBL season as the 36ers' second assistant, when in November 2013 he was appointed head coach of the Adelaide Lightning of the Women's National Basketball League to see out the 2013–14 WNBL season. He returned to the 36ers as assistant coach in the 2014–15 NBL season. During this time, he was also serving as coaching director at the Forestville Eagles.

In September 2015, Dickel moved to Norway to serve as head coach of the Nidaros Jets in the Basketligaen Norge.

In May 2017, Dickel was named head coach of the Launceston Tornadoes in the South East Australian Basketball League. He coached the team to a 12–10 record and left after the 2017 season.

In April 2018, Dickel was appointed as basketball development manager at the South Adelaide Basketball Club. In August 2018, he was named the South Adelaide Panthers women's team's head coach for the 2019 Premier League season. The Premier League became the NBL1 Central in 2020 but the 2020 NBL1 season was cancelled due to the COVID-19 pandemic. In the 2021 NBL1 season, South Adelaide finished the regular season in third place with 12 wins and six losses. Dickel guided the Panthers to a finals berth, falling just four points short of reaching the grand final. Dickel re-signed as Panthers coach in November 2021. He was re-appointed again in December 2022. He parted ways with the Panthers following the 2023 NBL1 season.

On 1 November 2023, Dickel was appointed head coach of the Norwood Flames women's team for the 2024 NBL1 Central season. He parted ways with Norwood mid-season in May 2024.

In November 2024, Dickel was appointed player, coach and community development manager at the Sunshine Coast Phoenix.

== Personal life ==
His father, Carl Dickel, played first-class cricket for Otago and coached the New Zealand women's national basketball team for ten years and the Otago Nuggets for four seasons. His brother, Mark Dickel, is a former basketball player.
