= Otto Dickel =

German politician (1880–1944)

- Born: 5 June 1880; Darmstadt
- Died: 15 June 1944 (aged 64); Undingen
- Occupation: Founder of the Völkisch Work Community
- Known for: Founder of the Völkisch Work Community, negotiating with the Nazi Party

Otto Dickel (5 June 1880 in Darmstadt – 15 June 1944 in Undingen) was the founder of the fascist Völkisch Work Community that existed in Germany during the Weimar Republic era. In 1921, Dickel participated in negotiations with the Nazi Party under the leadership of Anton Drexler, who attempted to negotiate with Dickel to merge the Volkish Work Community with the Nazi Party and the German Social Party. However such plans were scrapped when Adolf Hitler, then only a member of the Nazi party, vehemently rejected the plan and threatened to resign from the NSDAP if the Nazis agreed to the merger. Hitler personally accused Dickel of being an enemy of National Socialism. Over time, Dickel would gradually drift away from his economic views and by the 1930s had become a proponent of laissez-faire capitalism.

Otto Dickel spoke of the need for the creation of a Greater German nation, the revival of the German nation as well as German and Western culture and the need to abandon what he saw as a cowardly contemporary culture.

Many a time acquaintances have told me that I see the world differently from them. That is true. Who sees it correctly? Men of science with their mechanistic thinking will certainly attack me, will carp and criticize, will discover some errors and ridicule me. Let them. But if in the immediate future, perhaps even before this book is published events take place in Russia as I have foretold, if social ferment begins in France, which is heading for the most uncompromising imperialism, and, as I fear, in England too, if the German people, overwhelmed by despair, is gripped by the irresistible force of the national resurgence, then I can only wish it be men who see as I so. Men who comprehend the meaning of the world war and of contemporary events and through their bold action create a free German people on its own soil. Dr. Otto Dickel, The Resurgence of the West, 1921.

The perfection of Western culture is eminent. The great creative spirit which smooths its path will come because its hour approaches. It will prevail. For the German people will understand it, follow it loyally to the bitter end, because it is a healthy and vital people. Come what may, there is one thing no one must let himself be robbed of without sacrificing himself: the faith in the German people in its world-historical task, and its fortune!. Dr. Otto Dickel, The Resurgence of the West
