= Logan Park High School =

- Te Kura Tuarua o Kapua o te Raki

Location
- 74 Butts Road; North Dunedin; Dunedin 9016; New Zealand; 45°51′43″S 170°31′45″E

Information
- Funding type: State
- Motto: Māori: Kua mutu kua timata (It is finished, but has again begun)
- Established: 1974
- Ministry of Education Institution no.: 376
- Chairperson: Ronda Tokona
- Co-principals: Peter Hills & Kirsty Sangster
- Years offered: 9–13
- Gender: co-educational
- Enrolment: 796 (July 2026)
- Socio-economic decile: 7O
- Website: lphs.school.nz

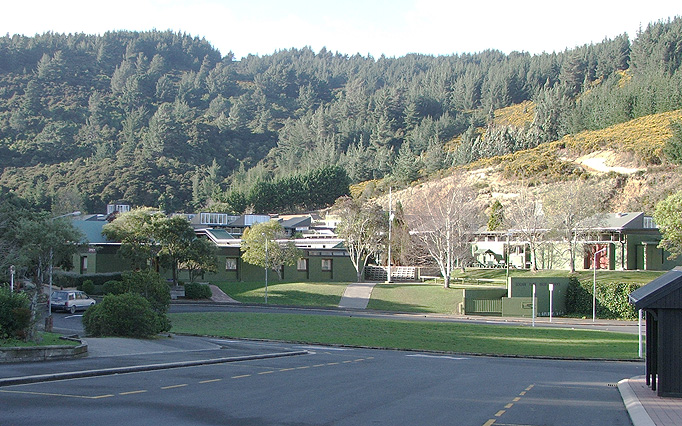
Logan Park High School

Logan Park High School is a high school founded in 1974 in Dunedin, New Zealand. It has a roll of 796 students as of July 2026 with a teaching staff of about 50, with some 18 further auxiliary and administrative staff.

== History ==
The school was built on the site of a former rifle range in a small wooded valley adjacent to Logan Park, an area of land reclaimed from the former Lake Logan (itself previously Pelichet Bay). It is now largely converted into a park and playing fields in Dunedin North. It admitted third-form (Year 9) students in 1974 and expanded to all forms the following year, when it was formally opened in June by Phil Amos, the Minister of Education. The city's main athletics and soccer venue, the Caledonian Ground, is located next to the school grounds. Forsyth Barr Stadium at University Plaza and the University Oval cricket ground are also located nearby.

The school developed from an earlier school in central Dunedin, King Edward Technical College, which itself had long links with Otago Polytechnic (which has also previously occupied a central Dunedin site). The school's proximity to the city's tertiary institutions (the University of Otago and Otago Polytechnic) allows the school access to tertiary study facilities it would otherwise not have access to.

Like most New Zealand state secondary schools of the era, Logan Park High School was constructed to the S68 standard plan, characterised by its single-storey classroom blocks of masonry construction, low-pitched roofs and internal open courtyards.

The founding principal was "Arch" Wilson. He disappeared after embarking on a climbing expedition on Mount Aspiring in 1980.

Colin Croudis was principal between 1980 until 1992.

In 1998, Jane Johnson was appointed as the school's first female principal. Ms Johnson retired in 2017, and in September of that year, co-principals Peter Hills and Kristan Mouat were appointed. Kristan Mouat and Peter Hills remained co-principals until Mouat died on 10 June 2023.

On 17 March 2020, the high school was shut down for 48 hours after one of its students tested positive for the Coronavirus disease 2019. The school's closure was part of the New Zealand Government's heightened health measures in response to the COVID-19 pandemic in New Zealand.

In March 2025, the school celebrated its 50th anniversary.

== Enrolment ==
As of July 2026, the school has roll of 796 students, of which 102 (12.8%) identify as Māori.

As of 2026, the school has an Equity Index of 430, placing it amongst schools whose students have below average socioeconomic barriers to achievement (roughly equivalent to decile 7 under the former socio-economic decile system).

== Education ==
Logan Park has a current roll of 796 students, and its roll peaked at about 1200 in 1995. The school has a teaching staff of about 35, with some 15 further auxiliary and administrative staff. LPHS is one of the four-state coeducational schools in Dunedin.

Logan Park High School combines both a junior and a senior school. Year 9 (Form 3) and Year 10 (Form 4) are the juniors of the school; Years 11 to 13 (Forms 5 to 7) are the seniors of the school. Most senior students sit their NCEA examinations during their time at the school.

== Culture ==
The school's motto, Kua mutu, kua timata is Māori, and means "It is finished, but has again begun" – a reference to the new school rising from the old King Edward Technical College, and also to high school as a transition from childhood to adulthood.

The school uniform's colours are black, white, and maroon, Year 9 and 10 students wear the junior uniform of a white shirt, black trousers/maroon kilt with optional polar fleece or jersey, Years 11 and 12 wear the senior uniform adding a blazer and tie to the junior uniform. Year 13 students do not wear uniform during their final year. The uniform is fully gender neutral.

The school was divided into five houses although starting in 2008 there have been four, each with its own dean. These houses are named Clayton, Omimi, Aoraki (formerly Aorangi), Toroa and Potiki (although not featuring in the 2008 school year and in subsequent years). As of 2022 each house is split into multiple groups.

Logan Park High School is regarded as important in the history of New Zealand rock music as being one of the elements that made up the Dunedin sound. Many of the musicians who were at the forefront of this movement in the 1980s were pupils of Logan Park when they made their first public musical performances.

== Notable alumni ==
- Andrew Brough – musician
- Belinda Colling – netball player
- Helen Danesh-Meyer – ophthalmology academic
- Mark Dickel – basketballer
- Richard Dickel – basketball coach
- Jane Dodd – musician
- Chris Donaldson – athlete
- Graeme Downes – musician
- Alastair Galbraith – musician
- Pip Hall – actor and writer
- Aldous Harding – musician
- Matt Heath – actor and radio host
- Helen Varley Jamieson – theatre and digital artist
- Kashi Leuchs – cyclist
- Filipo Levi – rugby player
- Tania Murray – athlete
- Joanna Norris – former editor of The Christchurch Press
- Michael Norris – composer
- Nigel Bluck – cinematographer
- Jesse O'Brien – musician, NZ Idol finalist
- Jabez Olssen – Emmy award winning film editor
- Martin Phillipps – musician
- Nadia Reid – musician
- Darren Stedman – musician
- Andrew Wilson – musician
- Michael Prain – musician
