= Thomas Dickel =

New Zealand cricketer

Personal information
- Full name: Thomas Henry Victor Dickel
- Born: 31 July 1897; Dunedin, Otago, New Zealand
- Died: 18 February 1969 (aged 71); Dunedin, Otago, New Zealand

Domestic team information
- Years: Team
- 1917/18: Otago
- Source: ESPNcricinfo, 8 May 2016

Thomas Henry Victor Dickel (31 July 1897 – 18 February 1969) was a New Zealand cricketer. He played one first-class match for Otago during the 1917–18 season.

Dickel was born at Dunedin in 1897. He worked as a traffic inspector. His only first-class match was played against Southland at Carisbrook in Dunedin in March 1918. Batting last in the Otago order, Dickel scored 28 runs in his only innings. He did not take a wicket in the 20 overs he bowled.

Dickel died at Dunedin in 1969. He was aged 71.
