= Gau Franconia =

Nazi subdivision

- Gau of Nazi Germany
- 1929–1945
- Flag Coat of arms

- Map of Nazi Germany showing its administrative subdivisions (Gaue and Reichsgaue). Gau Franken in dark brown.
- Capital: Nuremberg
- Population
  - 17 May 1939: 1,065,122
- Government
- Gauleiter
  - 1929–1940: Julius Streicher
  - 1940–1942 (acting): Hans Zimmermann
  - 1942–1944 (acting): Karl Holz
  - 1944–1945: Karl Holz
- History
  - Establishment: 1 March 1929
  - Disestablishment: 8 May 1945
Preceded by	Succeeded by
Bavaria	Bavaria
- Today part of: Germany

Gau Franconia (German: Gau Franken) was an administrative division of Nazi Germany in Middle Franconia, Bavaria, from 1933 to 1945. Before that, from 1929 to 1933, it was the regional subdivision of the Nazi Party in that area. Originally formed as Middle Franconia (German: Mittelfranken) in 1929, it was renamed Franconia in 1936.

== History ==
The Nazi Gau (plural: Gaue) system was originally established in a party conference on 22 May 1926, in order to improve administration of the party structure. From 1933 onward, after the Nazi seizure of power, the Gaue increasingly replaced the German states as administrative subdivisions in Germany.

At the head of each Gau stood a Gauleiter, a position which became increasingly more powerful, especially after the outbreak of the Second World War, with little interference from above. Local Gauleiters often held government positions as well as party ones and were in charge of, among other things, propaganda and surveillance and, from September 1944 onward, the Volkssturm and the defense of the Gau.

The position of Gauleiter in Franconia was originally held by Julius Streicher from 1929 until 1940 when he was removed from the position. Streicher was later tried at the Nuremberg trials and executed for crimes against humanity on 16 October 1946. The position of Gauleiter was not filled again until 1944, with Hans Zimmermann (1940–42) and Karl Holz (1942–44) each serving as acting Gauleiter. Holz officially took up the post in 1944 and held it until his own death in April 1945.
