= Zusmarshausen =

Zusmarshausen Zusmarshausen
- Municipality
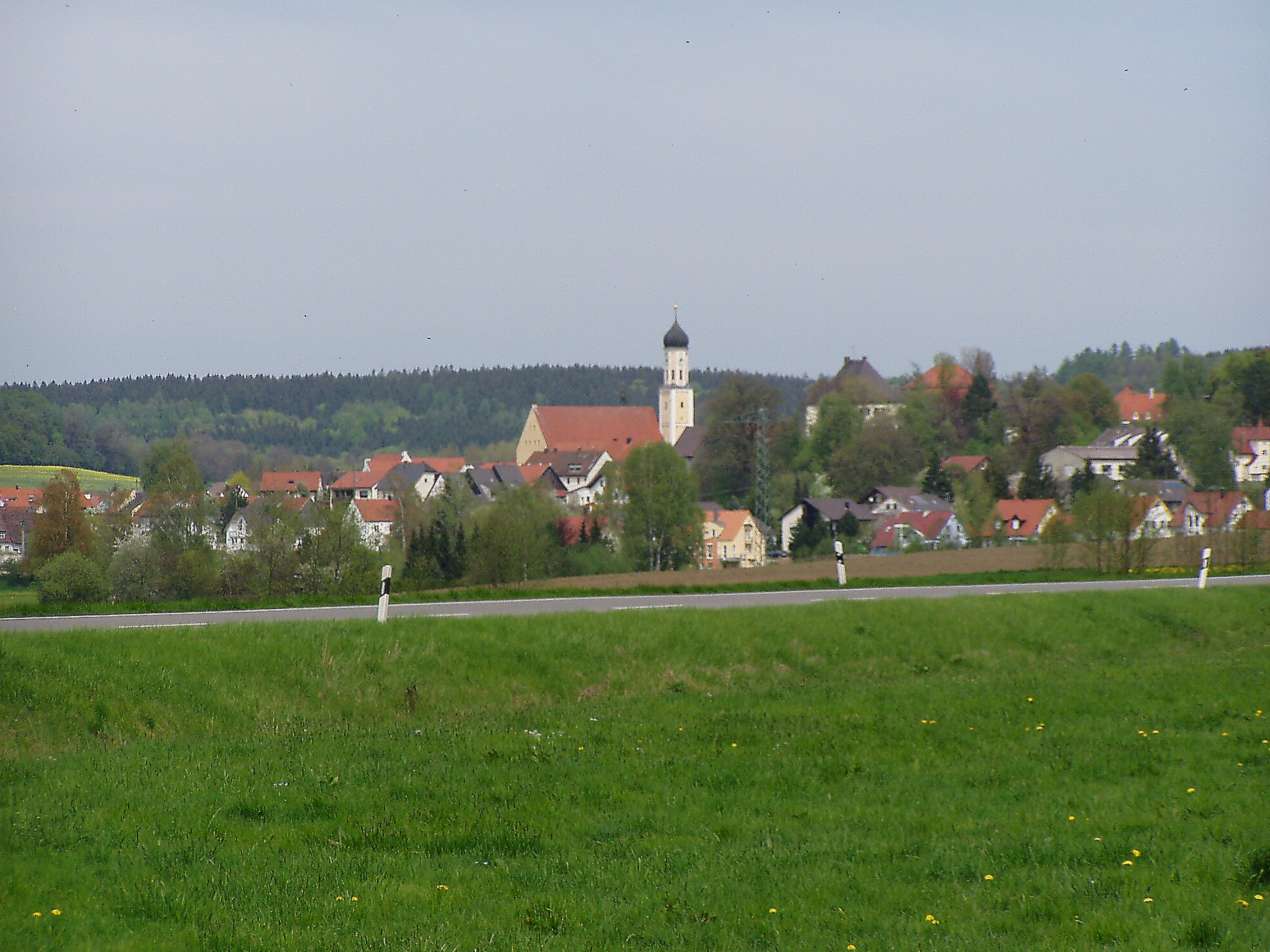
- Zusmarshausen seen from the southwest

- Coat of arms

- Location of Zusmarshausen within Augsburg district
- Interactive map of Zusmarshausen
- Location within Germany Location within Bavaria
- Coordinates: 48°23′N 10°35′E
- Country: Germany
- State: Bavaria
- Admin. region: Schwaben
- District: Augsburg
- Subdivisions: 8 Ortsteile

Government
  - Mayor (2020–26): Bernhard Uhl (CSU)

Area
  - Total: 68.72 km^{2} (26.53 sq mi)
- Elevation: 466 m (1,529 ft)

Population (2025-12-31)
  - Total: 6,661
  - Density: 96.93/km^{2} (251.0/sq mi)
- Time zone: UTC+01:00 (CET)
  - Summer (DST): UTC+02:00 (CEST)
- Postal codes: 86441
- Dialling codes: +49 (0)8291
- Vehicle registration: A
- Website: www.zusmarshausen.de

Zusmarshausen is a municipality in the district of Augsburg, Bavaria, Germany. The 1648 Battle of Zusmarshausen took place here.

It lies on the river Zusam and is a part of the Augsburg Western Woods Nature Park. Its districts are Friedensdorf, Gabelbach, Gabelbachergreut, Steinekirch, Streitheim, Vallried, Wollbach, Wörleschwang and Zusmarshausen itself.

== Local council (Marktgemeinderat) ==
Since the 2020 municipal elections, the Local Council of Zusmarshausen consists of 20 seats, allocated as follows:

- CSU – 8 seats (40.9%)
- Freie Wählervereinigung (FWV) (Free Voters' Association) – 7 seats (35.3%)
- Bürgerliste Zusmarshausen (BLZus) (Citizens' List) – 5 seats (23.8%)

=== Fraktionsergänzungen (Recent Membership Changes) ===
- In February 2023, Michael Tartsch (BLZus) replaced Harry Juraschek on the council after Juraschek resigned for health reasons
- In November 2023, Richard Hegele (BLZus), a long-serving councillor since 2002 and former 3rd mayor, stepped down

=== CSU–Fraktion (2024 Members) ===
Current CSU representatives include:

- Christian Weldishofer, 3rd Mayor
- Hubert Kraus
- Johann Reitmayer
- Alfred Hegele
- Ingrid Hafner‑Eichner (faction leader)
- Steffen Kraus
- Jürgen Winkler
- Guido Clemens

=== Bürgermeister (Mayor) ===
- Bernhard Uhl (CSU) has held the mayoral office since 2014 and was re-elected on 15 March 2020 with 63.6% of the vote

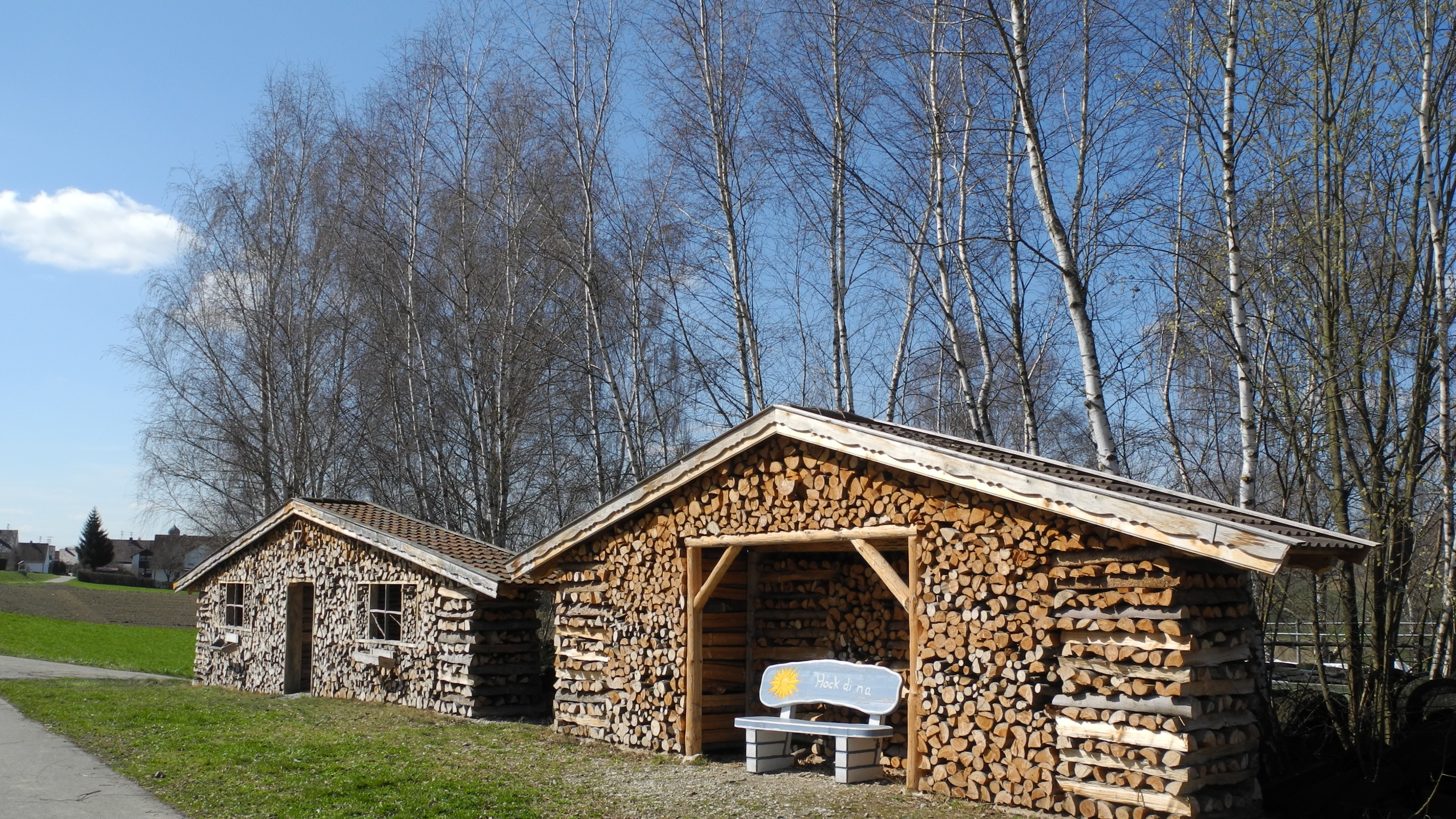
Wooden hut with bench
