= 2025–26 Sydney Kings season =

Australian professional basketball season

- NBL champions
- Regular season champions
- Head coach: (Australia) Brian Goorjian
- Captain: (Australia) Xavier Cooks
- Arena: Sydney SuperDome

NBL results
- Record: 24–9 (72.7%)
- Ladder: 1st
- Finals finish: Champions (6th title) (Defeated 36ers 3–2)
- Stats at NBL.com.au

Ignite Cup results
- Record: 1–3 (25%)
- Ladder: 9th
- Ignite Cup finish: Did not qualify
- All statistics correct as of 5 April 2026.

The 2025–26 Sydney Kings season was the 37th season of the franchise in the National Basketball League (NBL).

== Roster ==
Note: Flags indicate national team eligibility at FIBA-sanctioned events. Players may hold other non-FIBA nationalities not displayed.

2025–26 Sydney Kings roster
Players
Coaches

Pos.	No.	Nat.	Name	Ht.	Wt.
G	1	(United States)	Davis, Kendric (I)	1.80 m (5 ft 11 in)	82 kg (181 lb)
F	2	(United States)	Craig, Torrey (I)	1.96 m (6 ft 5 in)	100 kg (220 lb)
G/F	3	(Australia)	Robertson, Tyler (injured)	1.98 m (6 ft 6 in)	107 kg (236 lb)
F	5	(Australia)	Goodrick, Hunter (NRP)	2.01 m (6 ft 7 in)	102 kg (225 lb)
F	6	(Australia)	Galloway, Jaylin	1.97 m (6 ft 6 in)	92 kg (203 lb)
G	7	(Australia)	Bruce, Shaun	1.92 m (6 ft 4 in)	87 kg (192 lb)
G	8	(Australia)	Dellavedova, Matthew	1.93 m (6 ft 4 in)	91 kg (201 lb)
F	10	(Australia)	Cooks, Xavier (C)	2.03 m (6 ft 8 in)	83 kg (183 lb)
C	11	(Brazil)	Soares, Tim (I)	2.11 m (6 ft 11 in)	107 kg (236 lb)
F	12	(South Sudan)	Noi, Kouat	2.01 m (6 ft 7 in)	103 kg (227 lb)
C	14	(Australia)	Spurgin, Jason (DP)	2.13 m (7 ft 0 in)	113 kg (249 lb)
F	15	(South Sudan)	Maluach, Makuach	1.96 m (6 ft 5 in)	89 kg (196 lb)
F	20	(Australia)	Malual, Goc (DP)	1.96 m (6 ft 5 in)
G	21	(Australia)	Awan, Lueth (DP)	2.01 m (6 ft 7 in)
F	34	(Australia)	Leaupepe, Keli (injured)	1.98 m (6 ft 6 in)	109 kg (240 lb)
F	42	(South Sudan)	Kuol, Bul (injured)	2.01 m (6 ft 7 in)	94 kg (207 lb)

Head coach

- (Australia) Brian Goorjian

Assistant coach(es)

- (Australia) Andrew Bogut
- (Australia) Shaun Roger
- (Australia) Bill Tomlinson

Legend

- (C) Team captain
- (DP) Development player
- (IN) Inactive
- (I) Import player
- (SRP) Special restricted player
- (IRP) Injury replacement player
- (NRP) Nominated replacement player
- (NS) Next Star player
- Injured

- Roster
Updated: 11 March 2026

=== Depth chart ===
Pos.	Starting 5	Bench 1	Bench 2	Injured
PG	Matthew Dellavedova	Shaun Bruce		Tyler Robertson (injured)
SG	Kendric Davis (I)	Makuach Maluach	Lueth Awan (DP)
SF	Torrey Craig (I)	Jaylin Galloway		Bul Kuol (injured)
PF	Xavier Cooks	Kouat Noi	Goc Malual (DP)	Keli Leaupepe (injured)
C	Tim Soares (I)	Hunter Goodrick (NRP)	Jason Spurgin (DP)

== Standings ==
=== Ladder ===
Pos	2025–26 NBL season											
Pos	Team	Pld	W	L	PCT	Last 5	Streak	Home	Away	PF	PA	PP
1	Sydney Kings	33	24	9	72.73%	5–0	W11	13–4	11–5	3276	2879	113.79%
2	Adelaide 36ers	33	23	10	69.70%	2–3	L1	12–5	11–5	3042	2890	105.26%
3	S.E. Melbourne Phoenix	33	22	11	66.67%	3–2	L1	11–5	11–6	3324	3061	108.59%
4	Perth Wildcats	33	21	12	63.64%	4–1	W1	10–7	11–5	2996	2840	105.49%
5	Melbourne United	33	20	13	60.61%	2–3	W1	11–6	9–7	3041	2905	104.68%
6	Tasmania JackJumpers	33	14	19	42.42%	2–3	L2	6–10	8–9	2873	2884	99.62%
7	New Zealand Breakers	33	13	20	39.39%	2–3	W1	7–9	6–11	3022	3058	98.82%
8	Illawarra Hawks	33	13	20	39.39%	3–2	W2	7–9	6–11	3074	3205	95.91%
9	Cairns Taipans	33	9	24	27.27%	1–4	L2	4–13	5–11	2754	3194	86.22%
10	Brisbane Bullets	33	6	27	18.18%	0–5	L13	2–14	4–13	2710	3196	84.79%

Updated to match(es) played on 20 February 2026. Source: NBL.com.au

The NBL tie-breaker system as outlined in the NBL Rules and Regulations states that in the case of an identical win–loss record, the overall points percentage will determine order of seeding.

=== Ladder progression ===
Leader and qualification to semifinals
Qualification to semifinals
Qualification to play-in
Last place

2025–26 NBL season
Team ╲ Round	1	2	3	4	5	6	7	8	9	10	11	12	13	14	15	16	17	18	19	20	21	22
Adelaide 36ers	—	2	1	2	2	3	3	3	2	2	1	1	1	1	1	1	1	1	1	1	2	2
Brisbane Bullets	3	7	8	9	7	7	7	7	8	8	9	9	9	9	9	10	10	10	10	10	10	10
Cairns Taipans	7	4	7	7	8	10	9	10	10	10	10	10	10	10	10	9	9	9	9	9	9	9
Illawarra Hawks	—	9	9	8	10	8	10	8	7	9	8	8	8	8	7	8	8	7	8	8	8	8
Melbourne United	2	1	2	1	1	1	1	1	1	1	2	2	3	2	3	4	4	4	4	5	5	5
New Zealand Breakers	6	10	10	10	9	9	8	9	9	7	6	7	7	7	8	7	7	8	7	7	7	7
Perth Wildcats	5	6	4	3	6	5	5	5	5	4	4	5	5	5	5	5	5	5	5	4	4	4
S.E. Melbourne Phoenix	1	5	6	4	3	2	2	2	3	3	3	3	2	4	2	2	2	2	3	3	3	3
Sydney Kings	—	8	5	6	5	6	4	4	4	5	5	4	4	3	4	3	3	3	2	2	1	1
Tasmania JackJumpers	4	3	3	5	4	4	6	6	6	6	7	6	6	6	6	6	6	6	6	6	6	6

Updated to match(es) played on 20 February 2026. Source: NBL.com.au

== Game log ==
=== Pre-season ===
The 2025 NBL Blitz will run from 27 to 31 August 2025 with games being played at the AIS Arena, Canberra.

2025 NBL Blitz game log
Total: 0–2 (Home: 0–1; Road: 0–1)
August: 0–2 (Home: 0–1; Road: 0–1)

Game	Date	Team	Score	High points	High rebounds	High assists	Location Attendance	Record
1	28 August	@ Brisbane	L 100–92	Tim Soares (22)	Xavier Cooks (9)	Matthew Dellavedova (10)	AIS Arena n/a	0–1
2	31 August	S.E. Melbourne	L 81–102	Tim Soares (14)	Tim Soares (8)	Matthew Dellavedova (8)	AIS Arena n/a	0–2

=== Regular season ===
The regular season will begin on 18 September 2025. It will consist of 165 games (33 games each) spread across 22 rounds, with the final game being played on 20 February 2026.

2025–26 game log
Total: 24–9 (Home: 13–4; Road: 11–5)
September: 0–1 (Home: 0–1; Road: 0–0)

Game	Date	Team	Score	High points	High rebounds	High assists	Location Attendance	Record
1	28 September	Cairns	L 74–77	Kendric Davis (21)	Kouat Noi (9)	Matthew Dellavedova (5)	Sydney SuperDome; 8,536	0–1

October: 3–4 (Home: 2–2; Road: 1–2)

Game	Date	Team	Score	High points	High rebounds	High assists	Location Attendance	Record
2	4 October	New Zealand	W 97–75	Kendric Davis (28)	Tim Soares (8)	Matthew Dellavedova (7)	Sydney SuperDome; 10,798	1–1
3	8 October	Melbourne	L 93–107	Cooks, Davis (21)	Xavier Cooks (10)	Matthew Dellavedova (7)	Sydney SuperDome; 9,528	1–2
4	11 October	@ Adelaide	W 79–103	Kouat Noi (29)	Tim Soares (12)	Matthew Dellavedova (7)	Adelaide Entertainment Centre; 10,021	2–2
5	15 October	@ Tasmania	L 86–70	Jaylin Galloway (13)	Cooks, Soares (8)	three players (4)	Derwent Entertainment Centre; 4,139	2–3
6	19 October	Perth	W 94–72	Kendric Davis (25)	Cooks, Soares (8)	Cooks, Dellavedova (4)	Sydney SuperDome; 8,032	3–3
7	23 October	@ S.E. Melbourne	L 112–95	Kendric Davis (31)	four players (5)	Kendric Davis (6)	John Cain Arena; 3,786	3–4
8	26 October	Tasmania	L 89–90	Kendric Davis (22)	Xavier Cooks (8)	Matthew Dellavedova (6)	Sydney SuperDome; 11,023	3–5

November: 4–1 (Home: 1–0; Road: 3–1)

Game	Date	Team	Score	High points	High rebounds	High assists	Location Attendance	Record
9	1 November	@ Brisbane	W 79–116	Xavier Cooks (24)	Xavier Cooks (10)	Davis, Dellavedova (7)	Brisbane Entertainment Centre; 5,039	4–5
10	3 November	@ Melbourne	W 92–95	Kendric Davis (34)	Tim Soares (8)	Matthew Dellavedova (7)	John Cain Arena; 10,175	5–5
11	9 November	New Zealand	W 79–72	Cooks, Davis (21)	Xavier Cooks (14)	Kendric Davis (6)	Sydney SuperDome; 10,067	6–5
12	16 November	@ Illawarra	W 71–98	Kendric Davis (17)	Tim Soares (11)	Kendric Davis (8)	Wollongong Entertainment Centre; 5,378	7–5
13	23 November	@ Tasmania	L 104–81	Kendric Davis (20)	Makuach Maluach (5)	Jaylin Galloway (5)	Derwent Entertainment Centre; 4,340	7–6

December: 6–1 (Home: 4–0; Road: 2–1)

Game	Date	Team	Score	High points	High rebounds	High assists	Location Attendance	Record
14	3 December	@ New Zealand	L 95–90	Kendric Davis (18)	Xavier Cooks (7)	Kendric Davis (11)	Claudelands Arena; 2,770	7–7
15	12 December	@ Perth	W 79–108	Kendric Davis (38)	Xavier Cooks (6)	Kendric Davis (8)	Perth Arena; 10,958	8–7
16	14 December	@ Melbourne	W 86–92 (OT)	Kendric Davis (26)	Hunter Goodrick (10)	Kendric Davis (6)	John Cain Arena; 9,402	9–7
17	17 December	Adelaide	W 97–93 (OT)	Cooks, Davis (27)	Xavier Cooks (8)	Davis Dellavedova (7)	AIS Arena; 4,154	10–7
18	21 December	Cairns	W 119–77	Kendric Davis (21)	Xavier Cooks (6)	Kendric Davis (9)	Sydney SuperDome; 9,124	11–7
19	25 December	Illawarra	W 108–84	Kendric Davis (27)	Tim Soares (7)	Kendric Davis (9)	Sydney SuperDome; 7,732	12–7
20	30 December	Brisbane	W 95–70	Xavier Cooks (20)	Hunter Goodrick (8)	Kendric Davis (7)	Sydney SuperDome; 10,716	13–7

January: 6–2 (Home: 5–1; Road: 1–1)

Game	Date	Team	Score	High points	High rebounds	High assists	Location Attendance	Record
21	2 January	@ Adelaide	L 85–79	Kendric Davis (26)	Xavier Cooks (13)	Kendric Davis (6)	Adelaide Entertainment Centre; 10,044	13–8
22	5 January	S.E. Melbourne	L 117–124	Kendric Davis (30)	Makuach Maluach (6)	Kendric Davis (6)	Sydney SuperDome; 10,825	13–9
23	9 January	@ New Zealand	W 62–103	Kouat Noi (18)	four players (7)	Davis, Dellavedova (7)	Spark Arena; 3,229	14–9
24	11 January	Melbourne	W 97–94	Jaylin Galloway (27)	Goodrick, Maluach (9)	Kendric Davis (6)	Sydney SuperDome; 12,634	15–9
25	15 January	Brisbane	W 95–80	Kouat Noi (24)	Kouat Noi (10)	Kendric Davis (10)	Perth Arena; 8,981	16–9
26	22 January	Tasmania	W 105–94	Kendric Davis (40)	Tim Soares (8)	Kendric Davis (8)	Sydney SuperDome; 9,234	17–9
27	25 January	Adelaide	W 106–101	Torrey Craig (26)	Craig, Galloway (8)	Kendric Davis (14)	Sydney SuperDome; 16,846	18–9
28	29 January	Illawarra	W 122–104	Tim Soares (23)	three players (6)	Kendric Davis (9)	Sydney SuperDome; 7,740	19–9

February: 5–0 (Home: 1–0; Road: 4–0)

Game	Date	Team	Score	High points	High rebounds	High assists	Location Attendance	Record
29	1 February	@ Cairns	W 92–106	Kendric Davis (35)	Cooks, Davis (7)	Matthew Dellavedova (7)	Cairns Convention Centre; 4,002	20–9
30	8 February	@ S.E. Melbourne	W 88–114	Kendric Davis (30)	Craig, Soares (6)	Kendric Davis (9)	John Cain Arena; 10,175	21–9
31	13 February	@ Illawarra	W 94–120	Kendric Davis (24)	Robertson, Soares (7)	Kendric Davis (9)	Wollongong Entertainment Centre; 5,098	22–9
32	15 February	Perth	W 102–84	Kendric Davis (30)	Xavier Cooks (10)	Kendric Davis (10)	Sydney SuperDome; 13,613	23–9
33	20 February	@ Brisbane	W 77–117	Kendric Davis (31)	Xavier Cooks (8)	Kendric Davis (8)	Brisbane Entertainment Centre; 4,932	24–9

2025–26 season schedule

=== NBL Ignite Cup ===
The NBL introduced the new NBL Ignite Cup tournament for the 2025–26 season, with all games except the championship final counting towards the regular-season standings.

Pos	Team	Pld	W	L	PF	PA	PP	BP	Pts	Qualification
1	Adelaide 36ers	4	3	1	390	329	118.5	12	21	Ignite Cup final
2	New Zealand Breakers	4	3	1	441	385	114.5	11	20	Ignite Cup final
3	Perth Wildcats	4	3	1	399	365	109.3	9.5	18.5	
4	Melbourne United	4	2	2	390	359	108.6	9.5	15.5	
5	Tasmania JackJumpers	4	2	2	349	338	103.3	8.5	14.5	
6	S.E. Melbourne Phoenix	4	2	2	408	402	101.5	8	14	
7	Illawarra Hawks	4	2	2	372	397	93.7	7	13	
8	Brisbane Bullets	4	1	3	334	411	81.3	6	9	
9	Sydney Kings	4	1	3	350	381	91.9	5	8	
10	Cairns Taipans	4	1	3	340	406	83.7	3.5	6.5	

Updated to match(es) played on 28 January 2026. Source: Ignitecup.com.au

=== Postseason ===
2026 finals game log
Total: 5–2 (Home: 4–0; Road: 1–2)
Semifinals: 2–0 (Home: 1–0; Road: 1–0)

Game	Date	Team	Score	High points	High rebounds	High assists	Location Attendance	Series
1	11 March	Perth	W 105–104	Kendric Davis (35)	Torrey Craig (9)	Kendric Davis (6)	Sydney SuperDome; 10,132	1–0
2	14 March	@ Perth	W 75–89	Kendric Davis (27)	Makuach Maluach (8)	Davis, Dellavedova (5)	Perth Arena; 9,711	2–0

NBL Finals: 3–2 (Home: 3–0; Road: 0–2)

Game	Date	Team	Score	High points	High rebounds	High assists	Location Attendance	Series
1	21 March	Adelaide	W 112–68	Kendric Davis (25)	Tim Soares (8)	Kendric Davis (7)	Sydney SuperDome; 13,181	1–0
2	27 March	@ Adelaide	L 91–89	Kendric Davis (20)	Cooks, Craig (10)	Matthew Dellavedova (7)	Adelaide Entertainment Centre; 10,058	1–1
3	29 March	Adelaide	W 106–93	Kendric Davis (34)	Tim Soares (10)	Kendric Davis (15)	Sydney SuperDome; 18,373	2–1
4	1 April	@ Adelaide	L 92–91	Kendric Davis (22)	Tim Soares (9)	Kendric Davis (10)	Adelaide Entertainment Centre; 10,068	2–2
5	5 April	Adelaide	W 113–101 (OT)	Kendric Davis (35)	Xavier Cooks (12)	Kendric Davis (14)	Sydney SuperDome; 18,589	3–2

2026 finals schedule

== Transactions ==
Free agency began on 4 April 2025.

=== Re-signed ===
Player	Date Signed	Contract	Ref.
Makuach Maluach	28 April 2025	1-year deal	

=== Additions ===
Player	Date Signed	Contract	Former team	Ref.
Matthew Dellavedova	10 April 2025	3-year deal	Melbourne United	
Kendric Davis	22 April 2025	1-year deal	Adelaide 36ers	

=== Subtractions ===
Player	Reason left	Date Left	New team	Ref.
Izayah Le'afa	Option declined	10 April 2025	New Zealand Breakers	

== Awards ==
=== Club awards ===
- Club MVP: Kendric Davis
- Defensive Player: Bul Kuol
- Coaches Award: Matthew Dellavedova
- Members Player of the Year: Makuach Maluach
- Player's Player: Tyler Robertson

== See also ==
- 2025–26 NBL season
- Sydney Kings
