= 2025–26 Adelaide 36ers season =

Australian professional basketball season

- Head coach: (United States) Mike Wells
- Co-captains: (Australia) Bryce Cotton (Australia) Isaac Humphries (Australia) Dejan Vasiljevic
- Arena: Adelaide Entertainment Centre

NBL results
- Record: 23–10 (69.7%)
- Ladder: 2nd
- Finals finish: Runners-up (lost to Kings 2–3)
- Stats at NBL.com.au

Ignite Cup results
- Record: 3–1 (75%)
- Ladder: 1st
- Ignite Cup finish: Runners-up (lost to Breakers 107–111)
- All statistics correct as of 5 April 2026.

The 2025–26 Adelaide 36ers season was the 45th season of the franchise in the National Basketball League (NBL).

== Roster ==
Note: Flags indicate national team eligibility at FIBA-sanctioned events. Players may hold other non-FIBA nationalities not displayed.

2025–26 Adelaide 36ers roster
Players
Coaches

Pos.	No.	Nat.	Name	Ht.	Wt.
G	0	(Australia)	Kenyon, Matt	1.96 m (6 ft 5 in)	91 kg (201 lb)
G	1	(New Zealand)	Cameron, Flynn	1.96 m (6 ft 5 in)	90 kg (198 lb)
G	2	(Australia)	White, Isaac	1.88 m (6 ft 2 in)	85 kg (187 lb)
C	8	(Australia)	Humphries, Isaac (C)	2.11 m (6 ft 11 in)	112 kg (247 lb)
F	10	(South Sudan)	Manyang, Magok (DP)	2.06 m (6 ft 9 in)	91 kg (201 lb)
G	11	(Australia)	Cotton, Bryce (C)	1.82 m (6 ft 0 in)	76 kg (168 lb)
G	12	(United States)	Jenkins, John (I)	1.93 m (6 ft 4 in)	98 kg (216 lb)
C	14	(Australia)	Griscti, Ben (injured)	2.11 m (6 ft 11 in)	110 kg (243 lb)
G	17	(Australia)	Harris, Michael	1.93 m (6 ft 4 in)	85 kg (187 lb)
G	22	(New Zealand)	Rasmussen, Keanu	1.88 m (6 ft 2 in)	86 kg (190 lb)
F	31	(Serbia)	Rakocevic, Nick (I)	2.11 m (6 ft 11 in)	102 kg (225 lb)
G	34	(Australia)	Vasiljevic, Dejan (C)	1.90 m (6 ft 3 in)	94 kg (207 lb)
G	39	(South Sudan)	Manyang, Deng (DP)	1.98 m (6 ft 6 in)
G	42	(Australia)	Brogan, Che (DP)	1.98 m (6 ft 6 in)
F	45	(United States)	Cheatham, Zylan (I)	2.03 m (6 ft 8 in)	105 kg (231 lb)

Head coach

- (United States) Mike Wells

Assistant coach(es)

- (Australia) Luke Cann
- (Australia) Igor Cvjetkovic (development)
- (Australia) Jakob Dorricott (development)
- (Serbia) Marko Marinović
- (Australia) Kerry Williams

Legend

- (C) Team captain
- (DP) Development player
- (IN) Inactive
- (I) Import player
- (NRP) Nominated replacement player
- (NS) Next Star player
- Injured

- Roster
Updated: 14 January 2026

=== Depth chart ===
Pos.	Starting 5	Bench 1	Development	Injured
PG	Bryce Cotton	Isaac White	Keanu Rasmussen
SG	Dejan Vasiljevic	Michael Harris	Che Brogan (DP)
SF	Flynn Cameron	Matt Kenyon	Deng Manyang (DP)
PF	Zylan Cheatham (I)	John Jenkins (I)	Magok Manyang (DP)
C	Isaac Humphries	Nick Rakocevic (I)	Blake Jones (NRP)	Ben Griscti (injured)

== Standings ==
=== Ladder ===
Pos	2025–26 NBL season											
Pos	Team	Pld	W	L	PCT	Last 5	Streak	Home	Away	PF	PA	PP
1	Sydney Kings	33	24	9	72.73%	5–0	W11	13–4	11–5	3276	2879	113.79%
2	Adelaide 36ers	33	23	10	69.70%	2–3	L1	12–5	11–5	3042	2890	105.26%
3	S.E. Melbourne Phoenix	33	22	11	66.67%	3–2	L1	11–5	11–6	3324	3061	108.59%
4	Perth Wildcats	33	21	12	63.64%	4–1	W1	10–7	11–5	2996	2840	105.49%
5	Melbourne United	33	20	13	60.61%	2–3	W1	11–6	9–7	3041	2905	104.68%
6	Tasmania JackJumpers	33	14	19	42.42%	2–3	L2	6–10	8–9	2873	2884	99.62%
7	New Zealand Breakers	33	13	20	39.39%	2–3	W1	7–9	6–11	3022	3058	98.82%
8	Illawarra Hawks	33	13	20	39.39%	3–2	W2	7–9	6–11	3074	3205	95.91%
9	Cairns Taipans	33	9	24	27.27%	1–4	L2	4–13	5–11	2754	3194	86.22%
10	Brisbane Bullets	33	6	27	18.18%	0–5	L13	2–14	4–13	2710	3196	84.79%

Updated to match(es) played on 20 February 2026. Source: NBL.com.au

The NBL tie-breaker system as outlined in the NBL Rules and Regulations states that in the case of an identical win–loss record, the overall points percentage will determine order of seeding.

=== Ladder progression ===
Leader and qualification to semifinals
Qualification to semifinals
Qualification to play-in
Last place

2025–26 NBL season
Team ╲ Round	1	2	3	4	5	6	7	8	9	10	11	12	13	14	15	16	17	18	19	20	21	22
Adelaide 36ers	—	2	1	2	2	3	3	3	2	2	1	1	1	1	1	1	1	1	1	1	2	2
Brisbane Bullets	3	7	8	9	7	7	7	7	8	8	9	9	9	9	9	10	10	10	10	10	10	10
Cairns Taipans	7	4	7	7	8	10	9	10	10	10	10	10	10	10	10	9	9	9	9	9	9	9
Illawarra Hawks	—	9	9	8	10	8	10	8	7	9	8	8	8	8	7	8	8	7	8	8	8	8
Melbourne United	2	1	2	1	1	1	1	1	1	1	2	2	3	2	3	4	4	4	4	5	5	5
New Zealand Breakers	6	10	10	10	9	9	8	9	9	7	6	7	7	7	8	7	7	8	7	7	7	7
Perth Wildcats	5	6	4	3	6	5	5	5	5	4	4	5	5	5	5	5	5	5	5	4	4	4
S.E. Melbourne Phoenix	1	5	6	4	3	2	2	2	3	3	3	3	2	4	2	2	2	2	3	3	3	3
Sydney Kings	—	8	5	6	5	6	4	4	4	5	5	4	4	3	4	3	3	3	2	2	1	1
Tasmania JackJumpers	4	3	3	5	4	4	6	6	6	6	7	6	6	6	6	6	6	6	6	6	6	6

Updated to match(es) played on 20 February 2026. Source: NBL.com.au

== Game log ==
=== Pre-season ===
The 2025 NBL Blitz will run from 27 to 31 August 2025 with games being played at the AIS Arena, Canberra.

2025 NBL Blitz game log
Total: 1–1 (Home: 1–0; Road: 0–1)
August: 1–1 (Home: 1–0; Road: 0–1)

Game	Date	Team	Score	High points	High rebounds	High assists	Location Attendance	Record
1	27 August	Illawarra	W 104–83	Isaac White (20)	Zylan Cheatham (6)	Isaac White (6)	AIS Arena n/a	1–0
2	30 August	@ Tasmania	L 97–95	Harris, White (18)	Zylan Cheatham (6)	Isaac White (5)	AIS Arena n/a	1–1

=== Regular season ===
The regular season will begin on 18 September 2025. It will consist of 165 games (33 games each) spread across 22 rounds, with the final game being played on 20 February 2026.

2025–26 game log
Total: 23–10 (Home: 12–5; Road: 11–5)
September: 1–0 (Home: 1–0; Road: 0–0)

Game	Date	Team	Score	High points	High rebounds	High assists	Location Attendance	Record
1	28 September	Brisbane	W 87–80	Bryce Cotton (39)	Zylan Cheatham (14)	Bryce Cotton (6)	Adelaide Entertainment Centre; 9,429	1–0

October: 4–2 (Home: 2–1; Road: 2–1)

Game	Date	Team	Score	High points	High rebounds	High assists	Location Attendance	Record
2	2 October	@ Cairns	W 79–110	Bryce Cotton (28)	Zylan Cheatham (10)	Bryce Cotton (7)	Cairns Convention Centre; 4,213	2–0
3	9 October	Tasmania	W 98–89	Bryce Cotton (29)	Zylan Cheatham (9)	Bryce Cotton (9)	Adelaide Entertainment Centre; 9,320	3–0
4	11 October	Sydney	L 79–103	Flynn Cameron (15)	Cameron, Cheatham (8)	Flynn Cameron (7)	Adelaide Entertainment Centre; 10,021	3–1
5	16 October	S.E. Melbourne	W 88–71	Bryce Cotton (28)	Zylan Cheatham (14)	Bryce Cotton (6)	Adelaide Entertainment Centre; 9,802	4–1
6	18 October	@ Cairns	W 86–91	Bryce Cotton (53)	Cameron, Cheatham (8)	Bryce Cotton (5)	Cairns Convention Centre; 4,004	5–1
7	26 October	@ Melbourne	L 81–80	Bryce Cotton (22)	Zylan Cheatham (12)	Zylan Cheatham (9)	John Cain Arena; 10,175	5–2

November: 6–1 (Home: 3–1; Road: 3–0)

Game	Date	Team	Score	High points	High rebounds	High assists	Location Attendance	Record
8	2 November	Illawarra	W 90–88	Bryce Cotton (24)	Zylan Cheatham (13)	Bryce Cotton (9)	Adelaide Entertainment Centre; 9,983	6–2
9	6 November	@ New Zealand	W 79–83	Bryce Cotton (23)	Cameron, Cheatham (8)	Bryce Cotton (6)	Wolfbrook Arena; 3,859	7–2
10	9 November	Perth	L 87–94	Bryce Cotton (23)	Zylan Cheatham (9)	Bryce Cotton (7)	Adelaide Entertainment Centre; 10,029	7–3
11	13 November	@ Tasmania	W 86–97	Zylan Cheatham (27)	Zylan Cheatham (14)	Cheatham, Cotton (4)	Derwent Entertainment Centre; 4,340	8–3
12	16 November	Cairns	W 105–101 (OT)	Bryce Cotton (41)	Isaac Humphries (13)	Bryce Cotton (8)	Adelaide Entertainment Centre; 9,878	9–3
13	19 November	Illawarra	W 97–85	Bryce Cotton (31)	Isaac Humphries (9)	Bryce Cotton (13)	Adelaide Entertainment Centre; 9,964	10–3
14	22 November	@ S.E. Melbourne	W 81–94	Dejan Vasiljevic (22)	Zylan Cheatham (16)	Bryce Cotton (9)	John Cain Arena; 5,906	11–3

December: 6–1 (Home: 4–0; Road: 2–1)

Game	Date	Team	Score	High points	High rebounds	High assists	Location Attendance	Record
15	5 December	Brisbane	W 90–65	Cheatham, Cotton (20)	Nick Rakocevic (8)	Bryce Cotton (6)	Adelaide Entertainment Centre; 9,835	12–3
16	7 December	@ Perth	W 94–95	Isaac Humphries (28)	Flynn Cameron (8)	Bryce Cotton (12)	Perth Arena; 13,661	13–3
17	12 December	Melbourne	W 114–105 (OT)	Bryce Cotton (33)	Zylan Cheatham (9)	Bryce Cotton (13)	Adelaide Entertainment Centre; 10,032	14–3
18	17 December	@ Sydney	L 97–93 (OT)	Bryce Cotton (25)	Zylan Cheatham (13)	Bryce Cotton (9)	AIS Arena; 4,154	14–4
19	20 December	@ Illawarra	W 78–84	Cotton, Humphries (16)	Nick Rakocevic (11)	Bryce Cotton (7)	Wollongong Entertainment Centre; 4,432	15–4
20	24 December	Cairns	W 93–73	Bryce Cotton (22)	Nick Rakocevic (13)	Bryce Cotton (11)	Adelaide Entertainment Centre; 10,006	16–4
21	28 December	Perth	W 95–84	Bryce Cotton (36)	Zylan Cheatham (9)	Bryce Cotton (7)	Adelaide Entertainment Centre; 10,041	17–4

January: 4–4 (Home: 1–3; Road: 3–1)

Game	Date	Team	Score	High points	High rebounds	High assists	Location Attendance	Record
22	2 January	Sydney	W 85–79	Flynn Cameron (25)	Zylan Cheatham (13)	Bryce Cotton (10)	Adelaide Entertainment Centre; 10,044	18–4
23	4 January	@ Brisbane	W 86–97	Bryce Cotton (23)	Zylan Cheatham (8)	Zylan Cheatham (10)	Brisbane Entertainment Centre; 5,406	19–4
24	9 January	Tasmania	L 72–80	Flynn Cameron (25)	Zylan Cheatham (12)	Bryce Cotton (5)	Adelaide Entertainment Centre; 10,041	19–5
25	18 January	S.E. Melbourne	L 89–108	Bryce Cotton (30)	Zylan Cheatham (10)	Bryce Cotton (6)	Perth Arena; 6,953	19–6
26	23 January	@ New Zealand	W 110–112 (OT)	Bryce Cotton (33)	Zylan Cheatham (11)	Bryce Cotton (9)	Spark Arena; 3,866	20–6
27	25 January	@ Sydney	L 106–101	John Jenkins (20)	Isaac Humphries (10)	Bryce Cotton (9)	Sydney SuperDome; 16,846	20–7
28	28 January	@ Brisbane	W 74–107	Bryce Cotton (22)	Zylan Cheatham (7)	Bryce Cotton (8)	Gold Coast Sports Centre; 2,441	21–7
29	31 January	S.E. Melbourne	L 77–97	Bryce Cotton (26)	Zylan Cheatham (14)	Bryce Cotton (6)	Adelaide Entertainment Centre; 10,047	21–8

February: 2–2 (Home: 1–0; Road: 1–2)

Game	Date	Team	Score	High points	High rebounds	High assists	Location Attendance	Record
30	5 February	@ Illawarra	L 100–99	Bryce Cotton (28)	Zylan Cheatham (12)	Bryce Cotton (9)	Wollongong Entertainment Centre; 3,457	21–9
31	7 February	@ Melbourne	W 76–87	Nick Rakocevic (20)	Nick Rakocevic (12)	Flynn Cameron (8)	John Cain Arena; 10,175	22–9
32	14 February	New Zealand	W 92–89	Bryce Cotton (42)	Zylan Cheatham (12)	Zylan Cheatham (8)	Adelaide Entertainment Centre; 10,044	23–9
33	20 February	@ Perth	L 86–74	Nick Rakocevic (18)	Zylan Cheatham (11)	Flynn Cameron (7)	Perth Arena; 13,574	23–10
Cup	22 February	New Zealand	L 107–111	Bryce Cotton (34)	Nick Rakocevic (11)	Bryce Cotton (9)	Gold Coast Convention Centre; 5,078	–

2025–26 season schedule

=== NBL Ignite Cup ===
The NBL introduced the new NBL Ignite Cup tournament for the 2025–26 season, with all games except the championship final counting towards the regular-season standings.

Pos	Team	Pld	W	L	PF	PA	PP	BP	Pts	Qualification
1	Adelaide 36ers	4	3	1	390	329	118.5	12	21	Ignite Cup final
2	New Zealand Breakers	4	3	1	441	385	114.5	11	20	Ignite Cup final
3	Perth Wildcats	4	3	1	399	365	109.3	9.5	18.5	
4	Melbourne United	4	2	2	390	359	108.6	9.5	15.5	
5	Tasmania JackJumpers	4	2	2	349	338	103.3	8.5	14.5	
6	S.E. Melbourne Phoenix	4	2	2	408	402	101.5	8	14	
7	Illawarra Hawks	4	2	2	372	397	93.7	7	13	
8	Brisbane Bullets	4	1	3	334	411	81.3	6	9	
9	Sydney Kings	4	1	3	350	381	91.9	5	8	
10	Cairns Taipans	4	1	3	340	406	83.7	3.5	6.5	

Updated to match(es) played on 28 January 2026. Source: Ignitecup.com.au

=== Postseason ===
2026 finals game log
Total: 4–4 (Home: 4–0; Road: 0–4)
Semifinals: 2–1 (Home: 2–0; Road: 0–1)

Game	Date	Team	Score	High points	High rebounds	High assists	Location Attendance	Series
1	10 March	S.E. Melbourne	W 104–97	Bryce Cotton (42)	Nick Rakocevic (10)	three players (5)	Adelaide Entertainment Centre; 10,055	1–0
2	14 March	@ S.E. Melbourne	L 101–92	Bryce Cotton (29)	Nick Rakocevic (10)	Flynn Cameron (8)	John Cain Arena; 5,600	1–1
3	17 March	S.E. Melbourne	W 108–96	Bryce Cotton (38)	Zylan Cheatham (13)	Bryce Cotton (7)	Adelaide Entertainment Centre; 10,018	2–1

NBL Finals: 2–3 (Home: 2–0; Road: 0–3)

Game	Date	Team	Score	High points	High rebounds	High assists	Location Attendance	Series
1	21 March	@ Sydney	L 112–68	Isaac White (11)	Zylan Cheatham (7)	Bryce Cotton (7)	Sydney SuperDome; 13,181	0–1
2	27 March	Sydney	W 91–89	Bryce Cotton (28)	Nick Rakocevic (9)	Zylan Cheatham (7)	Adelaide Entertainment Centre; 10,058	1–1
3	29 March	@ Sydney	L 106–93	John Jenkins (22)	Zylan Cheatham (10)	Bryce Cotton (12)	Sydney SuperDome; 18,373	1–2
4	1 April	Sydney	W 92–91	Zylan Cheatham (23)	Isaac Humphries (10)	Bryce Cotton (12)	Adelaide Entertainment Centre; 10,068	2–2
5	5 April	@ Sydney	L 113–101 (OT)	Bryce Cotton (35)	Nick Rakocevic (13)	Bryce Cotton (9)	Sydney SuperDome; 18,589	2–3

2026 finals schedule

== Transactions ==
Free agency began on 4 April 2025.

=== Re-signed ===
Player	Date Signed	Contract	Ref.
Montrezl Harrell	29 May 2025	1-year deal	
Zylan Cheatham	21 December 2025	2-year deal	

=== Additions ===
Player	Date Signed	Contract	Former team	Ref.
Isaac White	5 April 2025	2-year deal	Brisbane Bullets	
Michael Harris	7 April 2025	2-year deal (mutual option)	Perth Wildcats	
Flynn Cameron	9 April 2025	3-year deal	Melbourne United	
Matt Kenyon	15 May 2025	1-year deal	S.E. Melbourne Phoenix	
Bryce Cotton	22 May 2025	3-year deal	Perth Wildcats	
Troy Brown Jr.	14 November 2025	1-year deal	Cangrejeros de Santurce	

=== Subtractions ===
Player	Reason left	Date Left	New Team	Ref.
Nick Marshall	Free agent	8 April 2025	Tasmania JackJumpers	
Sunday Dech	Free agent	23 April 2025	Perth Wildcats	
Lat Mayen	Free agent	23 April 2025	Perth Wildcats	
Kendric Davis	Free agent	21 April	Sydney Kings	

== Awards ==
=== Club awards ===
- Club MVP: Bryce Cotton
- Most Improved: Flynn Cameron
- Coaches Award: Isaac Humphries
- Members Choice: Bryce Cotton
- Best Defensive Player: Zylan Cheatham
- Chairman's Award: Nick Rakocevic

== See also ==
- 2025–26 NBL season
- Adelaide 36ers
