= 2025–26 Perth Wildcats season =

Australian professional basketball season

- Head coach: (Australia) John Rillie
- Captain: (Australia) Jesse Wagstaff
- Arena: Perth Arena

NBL results
- Record: 21–12 (63.6%)
- Ladder: 4th
- Finals finish: Semifinalist (lost to Kings 0–2)
- Stats at NBL.com.au

Ignite Cup results
- Record: 3–1 (75%)
- Ladder: 3rd
- Ignite Cup finish: Did not qualify
- All statistics correct as of 14 March 2026.

The 2025–26 Perth Wildcats season was the 45th season of the franchise in the National Basketball League (NBL), and their fourth under the leadership of head coach John Rillie.

== Roster ==
Note: Flags indicate national team eligibility at FIBA-sanctioned events. Players may hold other non-FIBA nationalities not displayed.

2025–26 Perth Wildcats roster
Players
Coaches

Pos.	No.	Nat.	Name	Ht.	Wt.
C	0	(South Sudan)	Lual-Acuil, Jo	2.11 m (6 ft 11 in)	103 kg (227 lb)
G	1	(New Zealand)	Russo-Nance, Dontae	1.90 m (6 ft 3 in)	90 kg (198 lb)
F	2	(South Sudan)	Mayen, Lat	2.06 m (6 ft 9 in)	92 kg (203 lb)
G/F	3	(United States)	Windler, Dylan (injured) (I)	1.98 m (6 ft 6 in)	85 kg (187 lb)
F	5	(United States)	Doolittle, Kristian (I)	2.01 m (6 ft 7 in)	105 kg (231 lb)
G	8	(South Sudan)	Dech, Sunday	1.95 m (6 ft 5 in)	92 kg (203 lb)
G	9	(Australia)	Rillie, Jaron (injured) (DP)	1.91 m (6 ft 3 in)	84 kg (185 lb)
G/F	10	(Australia)	Henshall, Ben	1.95 m (6 ft 5 in)	90 kg (198 lb)
G	12	(United States)	Duke Jr., David (I)	1.93 m (6 ft 4 in)	93 kg (205 lb)
F	13	(France)	Kouakou-Heugue, Noa (NS)	2.09 m (6 ft 10 in)	95 kg (209 lb)
F	22	(Australia)	Gerovich, Thomas (DP)	2.00 m (6 ft 7 in)
F	24	(Australia)	Wagstaff, Jesse (C)	2.03 m (6 ft 8 in)	103 kg (227 lb)
F	25	(Australia)	Huefner, Cameron (DP)	2.03 m (6 ft 8 in)	104 kg (229 lb)
F	35	(Australia)	Okwera, David	2.08 m (6 ft 10 in)	90 kg (198 lb)
G	40	(Australia)	Pepper, Elijah	1.93 m (6 ft 4 in)	91 kg (201 lb)

Head coach

- (Australia) John Rillie

Assistant coach(es)

- (Australia) Keegan Crawford
- (United States) Ben Peterson
- (New Zealand) Aaron Young

Strength & conditioning coach(es)

- (Australia) Josh Cavanagh

Legend

- (C) Team captain
- (DP) Development player
- (I) Import player
- (SRP) Special restricted player
- (NS) Next Star player
- Injured

- Roster
Updated: 14 March 2026

=== Depth chart ===
Pos.	Starting 5	Bench 1	Bench 2	Development	Injured
PG	Ben Henshall	Dontae Russo-Nance
SG	Elijah Pepper	Sunday Dech			Jaron Rillie (DP) (injured)
SF	David Duke Jr. (I)	Lat Mayen	Cameron Huefner (DP)		Dylan Windler (I) (injured)
PF	Kristian Doolittle (I)	Jesse Wagstaff	Noa Kouakou-Heugue (NS)	Thomas Gerovich (DP)
C	Jo Lual-Acuil	David Okwera

== Standings ==
=== Ladder ===
Pos	2025–26 NBL season											
Pos	Team	Pld	W	L	PCT	Last 5	Streak	Home	Away	PF	PA	PP
1	Sydney Kings	33	24	9	72.73%	5–0	W11	13–4	11–5	3276	2879	113.79%
2	Adelaide 36ers	33	23	10	69.70%	2–3	L1	12–5	11–5	3042	2890	105.26%
3	S.E. Melbourne Phoenix	33	22	11	66.67%	3–2	L1	11–5	11–6	3324	3061	108.59%
4	Perth Wildcats	33	21	12	63.64%	4–1	W1	10–7	11–5	2996	2840	105.49%
5	Melbourne United	33	20	13	60.61%	2–3	W1	11–6	9–7	3041	2905	104.68%
6	Tasmania JackJumpers	33	14	19	42.42%	2–3	L2	6–10	8–9	2873	2884	99.62%
7	New Zealand Breakers	33	13	20	39.39%	2–3	W1	7–9	6–11	3022	3058	98.82%
8	Illawarra Hawks	33	13	20	39.39%	3–2	W2	7–9	6–11	3074	3205	95.91%
9	Cairns Taipans	33	9	24	27.27%	1–4	L2	4–13	5–11	2754	3194	86.22%
10	Brisbane Bullets	33	6	27	18.18%	0–5	L13	2–14	4–13	2710	3196	84.79%

Updated to match(es) played on 20 February 2026. Source: NBL.com.au

The NBL tie-breaker system as outlined in the NBL Rules and Regulations states that in the case of an identical win–loss record, the overall points percentage will determine order of seeding.

=== Ladder progression ===
Leader and qualification to semifinals
Qualification to semifinals
Qualification to play-in
Last place

2025–26 NBL season
Team ╲ Round	1	2	3	4	5	6	7	8	9	10	11	12	13	14	15	16	17	18	19	20	21	22
Adelaide 36ers	—	2	1	2	2	3	3	3	2	2	1	1	1	1	1	1	1	1	1	1	2	2
Brisbane Bullets	3	7	8	9	7	7	7	7	8	8	9	9	9	9	9	10	10	10	10	10	10	10
Cairns Taipans	7	4	7	7	8	10	9	10	10	10	10	10	10	10	10	9	9	9	9	9	9	9
Illawarra Hawks	—	9	9	8	10	8	10	8	7	9	8	8	8	8	7	8	8	7	8	8	8	8
Melbourne United	2	1	2	1	1	1	1	1	1	1	2	2	3	2	3	4	4	4	4	5	5	5
New Zealand Breakers	6	10	10	10	9	9	8	9	9	7	6	7	7	7	8	7	7	8	7	7	7	7
Perth Wildcats	5	6	4	3	6	5	5	5	5	4	4	5	5	5	5	5	5	5	5	4	4	4
S.E. Melbourne Phoenix	1	5	6	4	3	2	2	2	3	3	3	3	2	4	2	2	2	2	3	3	3	3
Sydney Kings	—	8	5	6	5	6	4	4	4	5	5	4	4	3	4	3	3	3	2	2	1	1
Tasmania JackJumpers	4	3	3	5	4	4	6	6	6	6	7	6	6	6	6	6	6	6	6	6	6	6

Updated to match(es) played on 20 February 2026. Source: NBL.com.au

== Game log ==
=== Pre-season ===
The 2025 NBL Blitz will run from 27 to 31 August 2025 with games being played at the AIS Arena, Canberra.

2025 NBL Blitz game log
Total: 1–1 (Home: 1–0; Road: 0–1)
August: 1–1 (Home: 1–0; Road: 0–1)

Game	Date	Team	Score	High points	High rebounds	High assists	Location Attendance	Record
1	27 August	Melbourne	W 84–78	Ben Henshall (16)	Ben Henshall (7)	three players (2)	AIS Arena n/a	1–0
2	29 August	@ Illawarra	L 100–92	Dylan Windler (27)	Dontae Russo-Nance (8)	three players (5)	AIS Arena n/a	1–1

=== Regular season ===
The regular season will begin on 18 September 2025. It will consist of 165 games (33 games each) spread across 22 rounds, with the final game being played on 20 February 2026.

2025–26 game log
Total: 21–12 (Home: 10–7; Road: 11–5)
September: 1–1 (Home: 0–1; Road: 1–0)

Game	Date	Team	Score	High points	High rebounds	High assists	Location Attendance	Record
1	20 September	Tasmania	L 72–75	Mason Jones (16)	Jo Lual-Acuil (14)	Jones, Windler (3)	Perth Arena; 11,701	0–1
2	27 September	@ New Zealand	W 78–89	Jo Lual-Acuil (21)	Dylan Windler (15)	Doolittle, Henshall (3)	Spark Arena; 4,047	1–1

October: 4–3 (Home: 1–2; Road: 3–1)

Game	Date	Team	Score	High points	High rebounds	High assists	Location Attendance	Record
3	2 October	Illawarra	W 92–84	Jo Lual-Acuil (22)	Dylan Windler (14)	Doolittle, Jones (4)	Perth Arena; 11,572	2–1
4	10 October	@ Cairns	W 77–80	Jo Lual-Acuil (30)	Dylan Windler (11)	Russo-Nance, Windler (3)	Cairns Convention Centre; 3,985	3–1
5	15 October	Brisbane	L 93–110	Mason Jones (19)	Kristian Doolittle (5)	Kristian Doolittle (6)	Perth Arena; 6,110	3–2
6	19 October	@ Sydney	L 94–72	Jo Lual-Acuil (17)	Kristian Doolittle (10)	Lual-Acuil, Rillie (3)	Sydney SuperDome; 8,032	3–3
7	22 October	@ Cairns	W 78–110	Jo Lual-Acuil (24)	Kristian Doolittle (8)	three players (4)	Cairns Convention Centre; 3,317	4–3
8	25 October	Illawarra	L 84–85	Jo Lual-Acuil (18)	Jo Lual-Acuil (12)	Kristian Doolittle (5)	Perth Arena; 12,497	4–4
9	29 October	@ Tasmania	W 84–95	Jo Lual-Acuil (23)	Dontae Russo-Nance (7)	Kristian Doolittle (4)	Derwent Entertainment Centre; 4,139	5–4

November: 3–2 (Home: 2–0; Road: 1–2)

Game	Date	Team	Score	High points	High rebounds	High assists	Location Attendance	Record
10	2 November	@ S.E. Melbourne	L 94–89	Kristian Doolittle (19)	Kristian Doolittle (13)	Jaron Rillie (7)	John Cain Arena; 9,386	5–5
11	9 November	@ Adelaide	W 87–94	Dylan Windler (18)	Dylan Windler (12)	Dylan Windler (5)	Adelaide Entertainment Centre; 10,029	6–5
12	15 November	New Zealand	W 88–75	Kristian Doolittle (24)	Kristian Doolittle (14)	three players (2)	Perth Arena; 12,350	7–5
13	21 November	Tasmania	W 101–95	Kristian Doolittle (30)	Jo Lual-Acuil (8)	Kristian Doolittle (6)	Perth Arena; 10,930	8–5
14	23 November	@ Melbourne	L 98–87	Kristian Doolittle (20)	Kristian Doolittle (11)	Kristian Doolittle (6)	John Cain Arena; 9,212	8–6

December: 3–4 (Home: 1–3; Road: 2–1)

Game	Date	Team	Score	High points	High rebounds	High assists	Location Attendance	Record
15	4 December	Melbourne	W 96–84	Jo Lual-Acuil (18)	Kristian Doolittle (9)	Kristian Doolittle (7)	Perth Arena; 10,210	9–6
16	7 December	Adelaide	L 94–95	Jo Lual-Acuil (19)	Kristian Doolittle (11)	Kristian Doolittle (6)	Perth Arena; 13,661	9–7
17	12 December	Sydney	L 79–108	Dylan Windler (14)	Dylan Windler (8)	David Duke Jr. (7)	Perth Arena; 10,958	9–8
18	14 December	@ Brisbane	W 62–86	Ben Henshall (15)	Jo Lual-Acuil (9)	David Duke Jr. (3)	Brisbane Entertainment Centre; 5,167	10–8
19	18 December	S.E. Melbourne	L 76–77	David Duke Jr. (21)	Dylan Windler (11)	David Duke Jr. (5)	Perth Arena; 10,802	10–9
20	21 December	@ Tasmania	W 85–94	Kristian Doolittle (30)	Kristian Doolittle (6)	David Duke Jr. (5)	Derwent Entertainment Centre; 4,340	11–9
21	28 December	@ Adelaide	L 95–84	Kristian Doolittle (18)	Kristian Doolittle (6)	Ben Henshall (4)	Adelaide Entertainment Centre; 10,041	11–10

January: 7–1 (Home: 3–1; Road: 4–0)

Game	Date	Team	Score	High points	High rebounds	High assists	Location Attendance	Record
22	1 January	@ Brisbane	W 75–95	Jo Lual-Acuil (17)	Jo Lual-Acuil (8)	David Okwera (4)	Brisbane Entertainment Centre; 3,984	12–10
23	4 January	@ New Zealand	W 91–99	Kristian Doolittle (21)	Dylan Windler (10)	Henshall, Rillie (4)	Spark Arena; 5,141	13–10
24	10 January	@ S.E. Melbourne	W 97–107	Dylan Windler (27)	Kristian Doolittle (12)	Doolittle, Rillie (4)	State Basketball Centre; 3,422	14–10
25	16 January	Illawarra	W 92–87	Kristian Doolittle (21)	Kristian Doolittle (11)	Ben Henshall (7)	Perth Arena; 12,507	15–10
26	22 January	Cairns	W 106–69	Elijah Pepper (25)	Jo Lual-Acuil (6)	Ben Henshall (7)	Perth Arena; 11,377	16–10
27	25 January	Melbourne	L 73–74	Jo Lual-Acuil (24)	Jo Lual-Acuil (11)	three players (3)	Perth Arena; 12,707	16–11
28	28 January	S.E. Melbourne	W 101–93	Dylan Windler (23)	Dylan Windler (11)	Ben Henshall (9)	Perth Arena; 6,245	17–11
29	31 January	@ Illawarra	W 99–106	Kristian Doolittle (26)	Ben Henshall (9)	Ben Henshall (6)	Wollongong Entertainment Centre; 4,234	18–11

February: 3–1 (Home: 3–0; Road: 0–1)

Game	Date	Team	Score	High points	High rebounds	High assists	Location Attendance	Record
30	6 February	Cairns	W 98–84	Kristian Doolittle (32)	Dylan Windler (11)	Ben Henshall (5)	Perth Arena; 11,161	19–11
31	13 February	Brisbane	W 94–75	Kristian Doolittle (28)	Jo Lual-Acuil (8)	Kristian Doolittle (6)	Perth Arena; 11,447	20–11
32	15 February	@ Sydney	L 102–84	Kristian Doolittle (19)	Elijah Pepper (10)	Jesse Wagstaff (3)	Sydney SuperDome; 13,613	20–12
33	20 February	Adelaide	W 86–74	Elijah Pepper (22)	Jesse Wagstaff (7)	Kristian Doolittle (8)	Perth Arena; 13,574	21–12

2025–26 season schedule

=== NBL Ignite Cup ===
The NBL introduced the new NBL Ignite Cup tournament for the 2025–26 season, with all games except the championship final counting towards the regular-season standings.

Pos	Team	Pld	W	L	PF	PA	PP	BP	Pts	Qualification
1	Adelaide 36ers	4	3	1	390	329	118.5	12	21	Ignite Cup final
2	New Zealand Breakers	4	3	1	441	385	114.5	11	20	Ignite Cup final
3	Perth Wildcats	4	3	1	399	365	109.3	9.5	18.5	
4	Melbourne United	4	2	2	390	359	108.6	9.5	15.5	
5	Tasmania JackJumpers	4	2	2	349	338	103.3	8.5	14.5	
6	S.E. Melbourne Phoenix	4	2	2	408	402	101.5	8	14	
7	Illawarra Hawks	4	2	2	372	397	93.7	7	13	
8	Brisbane Bullets	4	1	3	334	411	81.3	6	9	
9	Sydney Kings	4	1	3	350	381	91.9	5	8	
10	Cairns Taipans	4	1	3	340	406	83.7	3.5	6.5	

Updated to match(es) played on 28 January 2026. Source: Ignitecup.com.au

=== Postseason ===
2026 finals game log
Total: 1–3 (Home: 1–1; Road: 0–2)
Seeding qualifier: 0–1 (Home: 0–0; Road: 0–1)

Game	Date	Team	Score	High points	High rebounds	High assists	Location Attendance	Record
1	4 March	@ S.E. Melbourne	L 111–94	Kristian Doolittle (22)	three players (6)	Dylan Windler (7)	John Cain Arena; 3,891	0–1

Play-in game: 1–0 (Home: 1–0; Road: 0–0)

Game	Date	Team	Score	High points	High rebounds	High assists	Location Attendance	Record
2	7 March	Melbourne	W 95–77	Jo Lual-Acuil (28)	Jo Lual-Acuil (12)	Doolittle, Henshall (6)	Perth Arena; 6,731	1–1

Semifinals: 0–2 (Home: 0–1; Road: 0–1)

Game	Date	Team	Score	High points	High rebounds	High assists	Location Attendance	Series
1	11 March	@ Sydney	L 105–104	Kristian Doolittle (31)	Jo Lual-Acuil (12)	David Duke Jr. (8)	Sydney SuperDome; 10,132	0–1
2	14 March	Sydney	L 75–89	Ben Henshall (20)	Jo Lual-Acuil (14)	David Duke Jr. (5)	Perth Arena; 9,711	0–2

2026 finals schedule

== Transactions ==
Free agency began on 4 April 2025.

=== Re-signed ===
Player	Date Signed	Contract	Ref.
Dylan Windler	20 April 2025	2-year deal	
David Okwera	24 April 2025	1-year deal	

=== Additions ===
Player	Date Signed	Contract	Former team	Ref.
Cameron Huefner	4 April 2025	3-year deal	Sam Houston Bearkats	
Sunday Dech	23 April 2025	3-year deal (mutual option)	Adelaide 36ers	
Lat Mayen	23 April 2025	2-year deal	Adelaide 36ers	
Jo Lual-Acuil	22 July 2025	2-year deal	Al Ittihad Alexandria	
Mason Jones	8 September 2025	1-year deal	Stockton Kings	
David Duke Jr.	24 October 2025	1-year deal	San Antonio Spurs	

=== Subtractions ===
Player	Reason left	Date Left	New Team	Ref.
Michael Harris	Free agent	7 April 2025	Adelaide 36ers	
Bryce Cotton	Free agent	22 May 2025	Adelaide 36ers	
Mason Jones	Released	17 October 2025	n/a	

== Awards ==
=== Club awards ===
- Club MVP: Kristian Doolittle
- Coaches’ Award: Thomas Gerovich
- Most Improved Player: David Okwera
- Best Defensive Player: Kristian Doolittle
- Players’ Player: Jesse Wagstaff

== See also ==
- 2025–26 NBL season
- Perth Wildcats
