= 2025–26 Brisbane Bullets season =

Australian professional basketball season

- Head coach: (Australia) Darryl McDonald (interim)
- Captain: (Australia) Mitch Norton
- Arena: Brisbane Entertainment Centre

NBL results
- Record: 6–27 (18.2%)
- Ladder: 10th
- Finals finish: Did not qualify
- Stats at NBL.com.au

Ignite Cup results
- Record: 1–3 (25%)
- Ladder: 8th
- Ignite Cup finish: Did not qualify
- All statistics correct as of 20 February 2026.

The 2025–26 Brisbane Bullets season was the 40th season of the franchise in the National Basketball League (NBL).

On 17 February 2025, Justin Schueller was released as Bullets' head coach after the team endured an injury-ravaged season in 2024–25, as they finished outside the top six with a 12–17 record.

On 3 April 2025, Stu Lash was appointed as Bullets' head coach on a three-year contract. After guiding the team to a 5–13 record to start the 2025–26 NBL season, Lash stepped down as head coach and Darryl McDonald was elevated to Bullets' interim head coach on 18 December 2025.

== Roster ==
Note: Flags indicate national team eligibility at FIBA-sanctioned events. Players may hold other non-FIBA nationalities not displayed.

2025–26 Brisbane Bullets roster
Players
Coaches

Pos.	No.	Nat.	Name	Ht.	Wt.
G	0	(New Zealand)	Murray, Taine	1.96 m (6 ft 5 in)	93 kg (205 lb)
G	1	(United States)	Freeman-Liberty, Javon (injured) (I)	1.91 m (6 ft 3 in)	86 kg (190 lb)
G/F	4	(Australia)	Ducas, Alex	2.01 m (6 ft 7 in)	100 kg (220 lb)
G	5	(United States)	Maldonado, Hunter (IRP)	1.98 m (6 ft 6 in)	91 kg (201 lb)
G	6	(Australia)	Devers, Tristan (DP)	1.91 m (6 ft 3 in)
G	8	(Australia)	Norton, Mitch (C)	1.84 m (6 ft 0 in)	90 kg (198 lb)
F	9	(Australia)	Dalton, Callum (NRP)	2.06 m (6 ft 9 in)	115 kg (254 lb)
F	12	(Australia)	Purchase, Jack	2.03 m (6 ft 8 in)	94 kg (207 lb)
G/F	13	(United States)	Patterson, Lamar (injured) (NRP)	1.96 m (6 ft 5 in)	102 kg (225 lb)
F	15	(Australia)	Holt, Jacob	2.08 m (6 ft 10 in)	113 kg (249 lb)
F	18	(New Zealand)	Smith-Milner, Tohi	2.05 m (6 ft 9 in)	117 kg (258 lb)
G/F	23	(United States)	Prather, Casey (injured) (I)	1.96 m (6 ft 5 in)	94 kg (207 lb)
C	24	(New Zealand)	Harrison, Tyrell	2.14 m (7 ft 0 in)	115 kg (254 lb)
G	26	(Australia)	McDaniel, Sam (injured)	1.98 m (6 ft 6 in)	102 kg (225 lb)
G	31	(United States)	Mathias, Dakota (injured) (I)	1.93 m (6 ft 4 in)	91 kg (201 lb)
F	32	(United States)	Taylor, Terry (I)	1.96 m (6 ft 5 in)	104 kg (229 lb)
F	50	(Australia)	Bradtke, Jensen (DP)	2.08 m (6 ft 10 in)	100 kg (220 lb)
PG	88	(China)	Zhou Kaiheng (TP)	1.85 m (6 ft 1 in)

Head coach

- (Australia) Darryl McDonald (interim)

Assistant coach(es)

- (Jamaica) Patrick Ewing Jr.
- (Australia) Greg Vanderjagt

Legend

- (C) Team captain
- (DP) Development player
- (IN) Inactive
- (I) Import player
- (TP) Training player
- (SRP) Special restricted player
- (NRP) Nominated replacement player
- (NS) Next Star player
- Injured

- Roster
Updated: 12 February 2026

=== Depth chart ===
Pos.	Starting 5	Bench 1	Development	Injured
PG	Hunter Maldonado (I)	Mitch Norton	Tristan Devers (DP)	Javon Freeman-Liberty (I) (injured)
SG	Taine Murray	Jack Purchase		Dakota Mathias (I) (injured)
SF	Alex Ducas	Tohi Smith-Milner		Sam McDaniel (injured)
PF	Terry Taylor (I)	Jacob Holt		Casey Prather (I) (injured)
C	Tyrell Harrison	Jensen Bradtke (DP)	Callum Dalton (NRP)	Lamar Patterson (NRP) (injured)

== Standings ==
=== Ladder ===
Pos	2025–26 NBL season											
Pos	Team	Pld	W	L	PCT	Last 5	Streak	Home	Away	PF	PA	PP
1	Sydney Kings	33	24	9	72.73%	5–0	W11	13–4	11–5	3276	2879	113.79%
2	Adelaide 36ers	33	23	10	69.70%	2–3	L1	12–5	11–5	3042	2890	105.26%
3	S.E. Melbourne Phoenix	33	22	11	66.67%	3–2	L1	11–5	11–6	3324	3061	108.59%
4	Perth Wildcats	33	21	12	63.64%	4–1	W1	10–7	11–5	2996	2840	105.49%
5	Melbourne United	33	20	13	60.61%	2–3	W1	11–6	9–7	3041	2905	104.68%
6	Tasmania JackJumpers	33	14	19	42.42%	2–3	L2	6–10	8–9	2873	2884	99.62%
7	New Zealand Breakers	33	13	20	39.39%	2–3	W1	7–9	6–11	3022	3058	98.82%
8	Illawarra Hawks	33	13	20	39.39%	3–2	W2	7–9	6–11	3074	3205	95.91%
9	Cairns Taipans	33	9	24	27.27%	1–4	L2	4–13	5–11	2754	3194	86.22%
10	Brisbane Bullets	33	6	27	18.18%	0–5	L13	2–14	4–13	2710	3196	84.79%

Updated to match(es) played on 20 February 2026. Source: NBL.com.au

The NBL tie-breaker system as outlined in the NBL Rules and Regulations states that in the case of an identical win–loss record, the overall points percentage will determine order of seeding.

=== Ladder progression ===
Leader and qualification to semifinals
Qualification to semifinals
Qualification to play-in
Last place

2025–26 NBL season
Team ╲ Round	1	2	3	4	5	6	7	8	9	10	11	12	13	14	15	16	17	18	19	20	21	22
Adelaide 36ers	—	2	1	2	2	3	3	3	2	2	1	1	1	1	1	1	1	1	1	1	2	2
Brisbane Bullets	3	7	8	9	7	7	7	7	8	8	9	9	9	9	9	10	10	10	10	10	10	10
Cairns Taipans	7	4	7	7	8	10	9	10	10	10	10	10	10	10	10	9	9	9	9	9	9	9
Illawarra Hawks	—	9	9	8	10	8	10	8	7	9	8	8	8	8	7	8	8	7	8	8	8	8
Melbourne United	2	1	2	1	1	1	1	1	1	1	2	2	3	2	3	4	4	4	4	5	5	5
New Zealand Breakers	6	10	10	10	9	9	8	9	9	7	6	7	7	7	8	7	7	8	7	7	7	7
Perth Wildcats	5	6	4	3	6	5	5	5	5	4	4	5	5	5	5	5	5	5	5	4	4	4
S.E. Melbourne Phoenix	1	5	6	4	3	2	2	2	3	3	3	3	2	4	2	2	2	2	3	3	3	3
Sydney Kings	—	8	5	6	5	6	4	4	4	5	5	4	4	3	4	3	3	3	2	2	1	1
Tasmania JackJumpers	4	3	3	5	4	4	6	6	6	6	7	6	6	6	6	6	6	6	6	6	6	6

Updated to match(es) played on 20 February 2026. Source: NBL.com.au

== Game log ==
=== Pre-season ===
The 2025 NBL Blitz will run from 27 to 31 August 2025 with games being played at the AIS Arena, Canberra.

2025 NBL Blitz game log
Total: 1–1 (Home: 1–0; Road: 0–1)
August: 1–1 (Home: 1–0; Road: 0–1)

Game	Date	Team	Score	High points	High rebounds	High assists	Location Attendance	Record
1	28 August	Sydney	W 100–92	Javon Freeman-Liberty (27)	McDaniel, Smith-Milner (6)	Jaylen Adams (6)	AIS Arena n/a	1–0
2	30 August	@ Melbourne	L 98–60	Tohi Smith-Milner (16)	Bradtke, Purchase (5)	Javon Freeman-Liberty (4)	AIS Arena n/a	1–1

=== Regular season ===
The regular season will begin on 18 September 2025. It will consist of 165 games (33 games each) spread across 22 rounds, with the final game being played on 20 February 2026.

2025–26 game log
Total: 6–27 (Home: 2–14; Road: 4–13)
September: 1–2 (Home: 0–0; Road: 1–2)

Game	Date	Team	Score	High points	High rebounds	High assists	Location Attendance	Record
1	19 September	@ New Zealand	W 95–104	Casey Prather (27)	Tyrell Harrison (15)	Jaylen Adams (7)	Spark Arena; 4,443	1–0
2	26 September	@ Cairns	L 83–82	Tyrell Harrison (22)	Freeman-Liberty, Harrison (7)	Jaylen Adams (6)	Cairns Convention Centre; 4,052	1–1
3	28 September	@ Adelaide	L 87–80	Casey Prather (20)	Tyrell Harrison (12)	Casey Prather (6)	Adelaide Entertainment Centre; 9,429	1–2

October: 3–4 (Home: 1–3; Road: 2–1)

Game	Date	Team	Score	High points	High rebounds	High assists	Location Attendance	Record
4	4 October	Tasmania	L 82–84	Jaylen Adams (19)	Tohi Smith-Milner (10)	Jaylen Adams (7)	Brisbane Entertainment Centre; 6,946	1–3
5	11 October	@ Illawarra	L 116–89	Casey Prather (28)	Casey Prather (9)	Lamar Patterson (5)	Wollongong Entertainment Centre; 4,709	1–4
6	15 October	@ Perth	W 93–110	Casey Prather (34)	Tyrell Harrison (15)	Adams, Patterson (6)	Perth Arena; 6,110	2–4
7	17 October	Melbourne	L 86–95	Jaylen Adams (29)	Tyrell Harrison (11)	Jaylen Adams (5)	Brisbane Entertainment Centre; 4,899	2–5
8	23 October	@ New Zealand	W 83–84	Casey Prather (23)	Casey Prather (12)	Jaylen Adams (5)	Eventfinda Stadium; 2,841	3–5
9	25 October	S.E. Melbourne	L 86–109	Casey Prather (18)	Tyrell Harrison (10)	Jaylen Adams (7)	Brisbane Entertainment Centre; 5,244	3–6
10	30 October	Cairns	W 113–85	Harrison, Prather (21)	Casey Prather (10)	Jaylen Adams (7)	Brisbane Entertainment Centre; 3,684	4–6

November: 1–4 (Home: 0–3; Road: 1–1)

Game	Date	Team	Score	High points	High rebounds	High assists	Location Attendance	Record
11	1 November	Sydney	L 79–116	Casey Prather (24)	Tyrell Harrison (7)	Callum Dalton (4)	Brisbane Entertainment Centre; 5,039	4–7
12	8 November	@ Tasmania	W 81–83	Casey Prather (28)	Tyrell Harrison (9)	Jaylen Adams (7)	Derwent Entertainment Centre; 4,340	5–7
13	12 November	New Zealand	L 84–113	Casey Prather (26)	Harrison, Prather (8)	Alex Ducas (5)	Gold Coast Sports Centre; 2,275	5–8
14	15 November	@ Melbourne	L 99–93	Mitch Norton (19)	Tyrell Harrison (11)	four players (3)	John Cain Arena; 8,930	5–9
15	20 November	S.E. Melbourne	L 76–103	Tyrell Harrison (16)	Jacob Holt (9)	Harrison, Norton (4)	Brisbane Entertainment Centre; 3,429	5–10

December: 1–6 (Home: 1–2; Road: 0–4)

Game	Date	Team	Score	High points	High rebounds	High assists	Location Attendance	Record
16	5 December	@ Adelaide	L 90–65	Dakota Mathias (14)	Tyrell Harrison (10)	Tristan Devers (4)	Adelaide Entertainment Centre; 9,835	5–11
17	11 December	@ Illawarra	L 100–85	Terry Taylor (18)	Terry Taylor (8)	Mitch Norton (4)	Wollongong Entertainment Centre; 3,481	5–12
18	14 December	Perth	L 62–86	Terry Taylor (18)	Tyrell Harrison (12)	Javon Freeman-Liberty (3)	Brisbane Entertainment Centre; 5,167	5–13
19	20 December	@ S.E. Melbourne	L 107–78	Javon Freeman-Liberty (17)	Tyrell Harrison (12)	Mitch Norton (5)	John Cain Arena; 10,175	5–14
20	22 December	New Zealand	W 99–85	Tyrell Harrison (24)	Freeman-Liberty, Harrison (11)	Javon Freeman-Liberty (7)	Brisbane Entertainment Centre; 4,538	6–14
21	27 December	Melbourne	L 87–92	Tyrell Harrison (23)	Tyrell Harrison (11)	Norton, Taylor (6)	Brisbane Entertainment Centre; 4,299	6–15
22	30 December	@ Sydney	L 95–70	Sam McDaniel (18)	Freeman-Liberty, Harrison (7)	Mitch Norton (6)	Sydney SuperDome; 10,716	6–16

January: 0–7 (Home: 0–4; Road: 0–3)

Game	Date	Team	Score	High points	High rebounds	High assists	Location Attendance	Record
23	1 January	Perth	L 75–95	Jacob Holt (17)	Jacob Holt (7)	Mitch Norton (6)	Brisbane Entertainment Centre; 3,984	6–17
24	4 January	Adelaide	L 86–97	Ducas, Taylor (18)	Holt, Taylor (7)	Hunter Maldonado (9)	Brisbane Entertainment Centre; 5,406	6–18
25	12 January	@ Cairns	L 88–83	Hunter Maldonado (31)	Terry Taylor (8)	Hunter Maldonado (5)	Cairns Convention Centre; 3,872	6–19
26	15 January	@ Sydney	L 95–80	Hunter Maldonado (20)	Terry Taylor (10)	Hunter Maldonado (5)	Perth Arena; 8,981	6–20
27	21 January	@ Melbourne	L 98–66	Jacob Holt (23)	Jacob Holt (8)	Maldonado, Taylor (4)	Bendigo Stadium; 3,978	6–21
28	26 January	Illawarra	L 75–113	Hunter Maldonado (20)	Murray, Taylor (6)	Taine Murray (5)	Brisbane Entertainment Centre; 4,075	6–22
29	28 January	Adelaide	L 74–107	Jacob Holt (24)	Terry Taylor (10)	Hunter Maldonado (8)	Gold Coast Sports Centre; 2,441	6–23

February: 0–4 (Home: 0–2; Road: 0–2)

Game	Date	Team	Score	High points	High rebounds	High assists	Location Attendance	Record
30	6 February	@ Tasmania	L 114–70	Hunter Maldonado (18)	Jacob Holt (9)	Taine Murray (3)	Derwent Entertainment Centre; 4,340	6–24
31	8 February	Cairns	L 72–81	Terry Taylor (25)	Jacob Holt (11)	Mitch Norton (4)	Brisbane Entertainment Centre; 5,443	6–25
32	13 February	@ Perth	L 94–75	Hunter Maldonado (18)	Jacob Holt (7)	Hunter Maldonado (7)	Perth Arena; 11,447	6–26
33	20 February	Sydney	L 77–117	Hunter Maldonado (16)	Alex Ducas (6)	Hunter Maldonado (6)	Brisbane Entertainment Centre; 4,932	6–27

2025–26 season schedule

=== NBL Ignite Cup ===
The NBL introduced the new NBL Ignite Cup tournament for the 2025–26 season, with all games except the championship final counting towards the regular-season standings.

Pos	Team	Pld	W	L	PF	PA	PP	BP	Pts	Qualification
1	Adelaide 36ers	4	3	1	390	329	118.5	12	21	Ignite Cup final
2	New Zealand Breakers	4	3	1	441	385	114.5	11	20	Ignite Cup final
3	Perth Wildcats	4	3	1	399	365	109.3	9.5	18.5	
4	Melbourne United	4	2	2	390	359	108.6	9.5	15.5	
5	Tasmania JackJumpers	4	2	2	349	338	103.3	8.5	14.5	
6	S.E. Melbourne Phoenix	4	2	2	408	402	101.5	8	14	
7	Illawarra Hawks	4	2	2	372	397	93.7	7	13	
8	Brisbane Bullets	4	1	3	334	411	81.3	6	9	
9	Sydney Kings	4	1	3	350	381	91.9	5	8	
10	Cairns Taipans	4	1	3	340	406	83.7	3.5	6.5	

Updated to match(es) played on 28 January 2026. Source: Ignitecup.com.au

== Transactions ==
Free agency began on 4 April 2025.

=== Re-signed ===
Player	Date Signed	Contract	Ref.
Casey Prather	7 February 2025	1-year deal	
Sam McDaniel	19 February 2025	2-year deal (mutual option)	
Tohi Smith-Milner	21 February 2025	1-year deal	
Javon Freeman-Liberty	18 November 2025	1-year deal	

=== Additions ===
Player	Date Signed	Contract	Former team	Ref.
Taine Murray	15 April 2025	2-year deal	Virginia Cavaliers	
Jacob Holt	15 May 2025	3-year deal (mutual option)	Sacramento State Hornet	
Jaylen Adams	13 July 2025	1-year deal	Sydney Kings	
Alex Ducas	28 July 2025	1-year deal	Oklahoma City Thunder	
Javon Freeman-Liberty	1 August 2025	1-year deal	Windy City Bulls	
Dakota Mathias	24 October 2025	1-year deal	Indiana Mad Ants	
Terry Taylor	16 November 2025	1-year deal	Stockton Kings	
Hunter Maldonado	27 December 2025	1-year deal	S.E. Melbourne Phoenix	

=== Subtractions ===
Player	Reason left	Date Left	New Team	Ref.
Isaac White	Free agent	5 April 2025	Adelaide 36ers	
Josh Bannan	Free agent	11 April 2025	Tasmania JackJumpers	
Javon Freeman-Liberty	Mutual release	9 October 2025	n/a	
Jaylen Adams	Released	14 November 2025	n/a	

== Awards ==
=== Club awards ===
- Club MVP: Tyrell Harrison
- Player of the Year: Mitch Norton
- Defensive Player of the Year: Mitch Norton
- Youth Player of the Year: Jacob Holt
- Narelle Kelly Award: Olly Reid
- Volunteer of the Year: Craig Leaney

== See also ==
- 2025–26 NBL season
- Brisbane Bullets
