= 2025–26 Illawarra Hawks season =

Australian professional basketball season

- Head coach: (United States) Justin Tatum
- Co-captains: (Australia) Sam Froling (United States) Tyler Harvey
- Arena: Wollongong Entertainment Centre

NBL results
- Record: 13–20 (39.4%)
- Ladder: 8th
- Finals finish: Did not qualify
- Intercontinental Cup: Fifth place (Defeated Utsunomiya 69–93)
- Stats at NBL.com.au

Ignite Cup results
- Record: 2–2 (50%)
- Ladder: 7th
- Ignite Cup finish: Did not qualify
- All statistics correct as of 20 February 2026.

The 2025–26 Illawarra Hawks season was the 48th season of the franchise in the National Basketball League (NBL).

As reigning NBL champions, the Hawks will compete in the 2025 FIBA Intercontinental Cup, becoming the second team from Oceania to play in the FIBA Intercontinental Cup.

== Roster ==
Note: Flags indicate national team eligibility at FIBA-sanctioned events. Players may hold other non-FIBA nationalities not displayed.

2025–26 Illawarra Hawks roster
Players
Coaches

Pos.	No.	Nat.	Name	Ht.	Wt.
C	0	(United States)	McGee, JaVale (I)	2.13 m (7 ft 0 in)	122 kg (269 lb)
G	1	(United States)	Harvey, Tyler (I & C)	1.93 m (6 ft 4 in)	84 kg (185 lb)
G	2	(New Zealand)	Ball, Jackson (DP)	1.91 m (6 ft 3 in)	82 kg (181 lb)
G	6	(Australia)	Hickey, William	1.94 m (6 ft 4 in)	92 kg (203 lb)
G/F	9	(Australia)	Swaka Lo Buluk, Wani	1.98 m (6 ft 6 in)	88 kg (194 lb)
G	10	(Australia)	McDowell-White, Kobe	1.83 m (6 ft 0 in)	98 kg (216 lb)
G/F	11	(Australia)	Grida, Daniel	1.97 m (6 ft 6 in)	93 kg (205 lb)
F/C	13	(Australia)	Froling, Sam (C)	2.13 m (7 ft 0 in)	109 kg (240 lb)
G	14	(Australia)	Bayles, Biwali	1.85 m (6 ft 1 in)	84 kg (185 lb)
G	16	(Australia)	Narkle, Johny (DP)	1.99 m (6 ft 6 in)	79 kg (174 lb)
F/C	19	(Australia)	Yates, Luca (DP)	2.08 m (6 ft 10 in)	102 kg (225 lb)
F	21	(Australia)	Blanchfield, Todd	1.98 m (6 ft 6 in)	98 kg (216 lb)
F	22	(Australia)	Peatling, Mason	2.03 m (6 ft 8 in)	105 kg (231 lb)
C	31	(Australia)	Froling, Harry (IRP)	2.10 m (6 ft 11 in)	123 kg (271 lb)
F	43	(Australia)	Bolden, Jonah (injured)	2.03 m (6 ft 8 in)	106 kg (234 lb)
G	77	(United States)	Peterson, Quentin (I)	1.83 m (6 ft 0 in)	84 kg (185 lb)

Head coach

- (United States) Justin Tatum

Assistant coach(es)

- (Australia) Tom Cranney
- (Australia) Matt Flinn
- (Australia) Sam Gruggen
- (Australia) Joel Khalu

Strength & conditioning coach(es)

- (Australia) Alex Moore

Legend

- (C) Team captain
- (DP) Development player
- (I) Import player
- (TP) Training player
- (IRP) Injury replacement player
- (NRP) Nominated replacement player
- (NS) Next Star player
- Injured

- Roster
Updated: 24 December 2025

=== Depth chart ===
Pos.	Starting 5	Bench 1	Development	Bench 3	Injured
PG	William Hickey	Biwali Bayles	Kobe McDowell-White (DP)
SG	Tyler Harvey (I)	Quentin Peterson (I)	Jackson Ball (DP)	Jonah Antonio (NRP)
SF	Wani Swaka Lo Buluk	Todd Blanchfield	Daniel Grida	Johny Narkle (DP)
PF	Sam Froling	Mason Peatling	Harry Froling (NRP)		Jonah Bolden (injured)
C	JaVale McGee (I)	Luca Yates (DP)

== Standings ==
=== Ladder ===
Pos	2025–26 NBL season											
Pos	Team	Pld	W	L	PCT	Last 5	Streak	Home	Away	PF	PA	PP
1	Sydney Kings	33	24	9	72.73%	5–0	W11	13–4	11–5	3276	2879	113.79%
2	Adelaide 36ers	33	23	10	69.70%	2–3	L1	12–5	11–5	3042	2890	105.26%
3	S.E. Melbourne Phoenix	33	22	11	66.67%	3–2	L1	11–5	11–6	3324	3061	108.59%
4	Perth Wildcats	33	21	12	63.64%	4–1	W1	10–7	11–5	2996	2840	105.49%
5	Melbourne United	33	20	13	60.61%	2–3	W1	11–6	9–7	3041	2905	104.68%
6	Tasmania JackJumpers	33	14	19	42.42%	2–3	L2	6–10	8–9	2873	2884	99.62%
7	New Zealand Breakers	33	13	20	39.39%	2–3	W1	7–9	6–11	3022	3058	98.82%
8	Illawarra Hawks	33	13	20	39.39%	3–2	W2	7–9	6–11	3074	3205	95.91%
9	Cairns Taipans	33	9	24	27.27%	1–4	L2	4–13	5–11	2754	3194	86.22%
10	Brisbane Bullets	33	6	27	18.18%	0–5	L13	2–14	4–13	2710	3196	84.79%

Updated to match(es) played on 20 February 2026. Source: NBL.com.au

The NBL tie-breaker system as outlined in the NBL Rules and Regulations states that in the case of an identical win–loss record, the overall points percentage will determine order of seeding.

=== Ladder progression ===
Leader and qualification to semifinals
Qualification to semifinals
Qualification to play-in
Last place

2025–26 NBL season
Team ╲ Round	1	2	3	4	5	6	7	8	9	10	11	12	13	14	15	16	17	18	19	20	21	22
Adelaide 36ers	—	2	1	2	2	3	3	3	2	2	1	1	1	1	1	1	1	1	1	1	2	2
Brisbane Bullets	3	7	8	9	7	7	7	7	8	8	9	9	9	9	9	10	10	10	10	10	10	10
Cairns Taipans	7	4	7	7	8	10	9	10	10	10	10	10	10	10	10	9	9	9	9	9	9	9
Illawarra Hawks	—	9	9	8	10	8	10	8	7	9	8	8	8	8	7	8	8	7	8	8	8	8
Melbourne United	2	1	2	1	1	1	1	1	1	1	2	2	3	2	3	4	4	4	4	5	5	5
New Zealand Breakers	6	10	10	10	9	9	8	9	9	7	6	7	7	7	8	7	7	8	7	7	7	7
Perth Wildcats	5	6	4	3	6	5	5	5	5	4	4	5	5	5	5	5	5	5	5	4	4	4
S.E. Melbourne Phoenix	1	5	6	4	3	2	2	2	3	3	3	3	2	4	2	2	2	2	3	3	3	3
Sydney Kings	—	8	5	6	5	6	4	4	4	5	5	4	4	3	4	3	3	3	2	2	1	1
Tasmania JackJumpers	4	3	3	5	4	4	6	6	6	6	7	6	6	6	6	6	6	6	6	6	6	6

Updated to match(es) played on 20 February 2026. Source: NBL.com.au

== Game log ==
=== Pre-season ===
The 2025 NBL Blitz will run from 27 to 31 August 2025 with games being played at the AIS Arena, Canberra.

2025 NBL Blitz game log
Total: 1–1 (Home: 1–0; Road: 0–1)
August: 1–1 (Home: 1–0; Road: 0–1)

Game	Date	Team	Score	High points	High rebounds	High assists	Location Attendance	Record
1	27 August	@ Adelaide	L 104–83	William Hickey (14)	Daniel Grida (10)	H.Froling, McLaughlin (3)	AIS Arena n/a	0–1
2	29 August	Perth	W 100–92	JaQuori McLaughlin (24)	Blanchfield, Bolden (7)	JaQuori McLaughlin (5)	AIS Arena n/a	1–1

=== Regular season ===
The regular season will begin on 18 September 2025. It will consist of 165 games (33 games each) spread across 22 rounds, with the final game being played on 20 February 2026.

2025–26 game log
Total: 13–20 (Home: 7–9; Road: 6–11)
September: 0–1 (Home: 0–1; Road: 0–0)

Game	Date	Team	Score	High points	High rebounds	High assists	Location Attendance	Record
1	27 September	Tasmania	L 86–91	JaVale McGee (32)	JaVale McGee (13)	JaQuori McLaughlin (6)	Wollongong Entertainment Centre; 5,123	0–1

October: 2–4 (Home: 1–1; Road: 1–3)

Game	Date	Team	Score	High points	High rebounds	High assists	Location Attendance	Record
2	2 October	@ Perth	L 92–84	JaVale McGee (26)	JaVale McGee (14)	Tyler Harvey (5)	Perth Arena; 11,572	0–2
3	8 October	@ New Zealand	L 117–88	Tyler Harvey (22)	Todd Blanchfield (8)	Tyler Harvey (6)	Spark Arena; 3,101	0–3
4	11 October	Brisbane	W 116–89	Tyler Harvey (22)	JaVale McGee (12)	Tyler Harvey (10)	Wollongong Entertainment Centre; 4,709	1–3
5	18 October	@ S.E. Melbourne	L 116–76	JaVale McGee (22)	JaVale McGee (11)	Tyler Harvey (3)	John Cain Arena; 5,615	1–4
6	25 October	@ Perth	W 84–85	Harvey, McGee (24)	JaVale McGee (11)	Tyler Harvey (8)	Perth Arena; 12,497	2–4
7	31 October	New Zealand	L 60–102	JaVale McGee (13)	JaVale McGee (10)	William Hickey (6)	Wollongong Entertainment Centre; 4,080	2–5

November: 2–4 (Home: 1–2; Road: 1–2)

Game	Date	Team	Score	High points	High rebounds	High assists	Location Attendance	Record
8	2 November	@ Adelaide	L 90–88	William Hickey (20)	JaVale McGee (11)	William Hickey (8)	Adelaide Entertainment Centre; 9,983	2–6
9	5 November	Melbourne	W 107–93	JaVale McGee (37)	JaVale McGee (14)	Hickey, Peterson (7)	Wollongong Entertainment Centre; 3,012	3–6
10	7 November	@ Cairns	W 90–107	JaVale McGee (28)	William Hickey (12)	William Hickey (12)	Cairns Convention Centre; 4,025	4–6
11	16 November	Sydney	L 71–98	William Hickey (19)	three players (9)	William Hickey (8)	Wollongong Entertainment Centre; 5,378	4–7
12	19 November	@ Adelaide	L 97–85	Tyler Harvey (21)	JaVale McGee (10)	William Hickey (7)	Adelaide Entertainment Centre; 9,964	4–8
13	21 November	Melbourne	L 102–105	JaVale McGee (28)	JaVale McGee (12)	William Hickey (7)	Wollongong Entertainment Centre; 3,872	4–9

December: 3–4 (Home: 3–2; Road: 0–2)

Game	Date	Team	Score	High points	High rebounds	High assists	Location Attendance	Record
14	4 December	S.E. Melbourne	W 113–109 (OT)	Quentin Peterson (42)	McGee, Swaka Lo Buluk (13)	William Hickey (10)	Wollongong Entertainment Centre; 3,432	5–9
15	6 December	Cairns	L 76–93	Daniel Grida (18)	Hickey, McGee (11)	William Hickey (6)	Wollongong Entertainment Centre; 3,946	5–10
16	11 December	Brisbane	W 100–85	JaVale McGee (30)	JaVale McGee (10)	Quentin Peterson (8)	Wollongong Entertainment Centre; 3,481	6–10
17	18 December	@ Melbourne	L 97–75	Harvey, McGee (18)	JaVale McGee (10)	William Hickey (6)	John Cain Arena; 7,205	6–11
18	20 December	Adelaide	L 78–84	Quentin Peterson (21)	William Hickey (10)	William Hickey (7)	Wollongong Entertainment Centre; 4,432	6–12
19	25 December	@ Sydney	L 108–84	JaVale McGee (20)	Sam Froling (12)	Hickey, Peterson (3)	Sydney SuperDome; 7,732	6–13
20	31 December	Tasmania	W 92–90	Froling, McGee (16)	Sam Froling (10)	Quentin Peterson (5)	Wollongong Entertainment Centre; 5,359	7–13

January: 3–5 (Home: 1–2; Road: 2–3)

Game	Date	Team	Score	High points	High rebounds	High assists	Location Attendance	Record
21	3 January	Cairns	W 96–78	Tyler Harvey (18)	JaVale McGee (10)	William Hickey (6)	Wollongong Entertainment Centre; 4,921	8–13
22	8 January	@ S.E. Melbourne	L 124–113 (OT)	Froling, Peterson (22)	Froling, McGee (9)	William Hickey (7)	State Basketball Centre; 3,422	8–14
23	11 January	New Zealand	L 96–101	Quentin Peterson (22)	Todd Blanchfield (7)	three players (6)	Wollongong Entertainment Centre; 5,323	8–15
24	16 January	@ Perth	L 92–87	Todd Blanchfield (16)	JaVale McGee (14)	William Hickey (7)	Perth Arena; 12,507	8–16
25	24 January	@ Tasmania	W 91–101	JaVale McGee (23)	JaVale McGee (8)	Hickey, Peterson (6)	Derwent Entertainment Centre; 4,340	9–16
26	26 January	@ Brisbane	W 75–113	Tyler Harvey (22)	JaVale McGee (10)	William Hickey (7)	Brisbane Entertainment Centre; 4,075	10–16
27	29 January	@ Sydney	L 122–104	Tyler Harvey (25)	JaVale McGee (9)	Froling, Hickey (5)	Sydney SuperDome; 7,740	10–17
28	31 January	Perth	L 99–106	Quentin Peterson (22)	JaVale McGee (11)	Hickey, Peterson (6)	Wollongong Entertainment Centre; 4,234	10–18

February: 3–2 (Home: 1–1; Road: 2–1)

Game	Date	Team	Score	High points	High rebounds	High assists	Location Attendance	Record
29	5 February	Adelaide	W 100–99	Harvey, Hickey (22)	JaVale McGee (14)	William Hickey (10)	Wollongong Entertainment Centre; 3,457	11–18
30	7 February	@ New Zealand	L 106–95	Blanchfield, Harvey (19)	William Hickey (10)	William Hickey (9)	Spark Arena; 2,750	11–19
31	13 February	Sydney	L 94–120	Tyler Harvey (16)	Mason Peatling (9)	Froling, Harvey (5)	Wollongong Entertainment Centre; 5,098	11–20
32	15 February	@ Melbourne	W 91–100	JaVale McGee (22)	JaVale McGee (13)	Quentin Peterson (6)	John Cain Arena; 10,175	12–20
33	18 February	@ Tasmania	W 70–103	Tyler Harvey (21)	Froling, McGee (10)	Tyler Harvey (4)	Derwent Entertainment Centre; 4,340	13–20

2025–26 season schedule

=== NBL Ignite Cup ===
The NBL introduced the new NBL Ignite Cup tournament for the 2025–26 season, with all games except the championship final counting towards the regular-season standings.

Pos	Team	Pld	W	L	PF	PA	PP	BP	Pts	Qualification
1	Adelaide 36ers	4	3	1	390	329	118.5	12	21	Ignite Cup final
2	New Zealand Breakers	4	3	1	441	385	114.5	11	20	Ignite Cup final
3	Perth Wildcats	4	3	1	399	365	109.3	9.5	18.5	
4	Melbourne United	4	2	2	390	359	108.6	9.5	15.5	
5	Tasmania JackJumpers	4	2	2	349	338	103.3	8.5	14.5	
6	S.E. Melbourne Phoenix	4	2	2	408	402	101.5	8	14	
7	Illawarra Hawks	4	2	2	372	397	93.7	7	13	
8	Brisbane Bullets	4	1	3	334	411	81.3	6	9	
9	Sydney Kings	4	1	3	350	381	91.9	5	8	
10	Cairns Taipans	4	1	3	340	406	83.7	3.5	6.5	

Updated to match(es) played on 28 January 2026. Source: Ignitecup.com.au

== Transactions ==
Free agency began on 4 April 2025.

=== Re-signed ===
Player	Date Signed	Contract	Ref.
Daniel Grida	1 April 2025	2-year deal	
Mason Peatling	1 April 2025	2-year deal	
Todd Blanchfield	7 April 2025	3-year deal	
Sam Froling	29 April 2025	3-year deal	

=== Additions ===
Player	Date Signed	Contract	Former team	Ref.
Jackson Ball	28 July 2025	1-year deal	Hawke's Bay Hawks	
JaVale McGee	1 August 2025	1-year deal	Vaqueros de Bayamón	
Jonah Bolden	5 August 2025	1-year deal	Capitanes de Arecibo	
Quentin Peterson	30 October 2025	1-year deal	Xinjiang Flying Tigers	

=== Subtractions ===
Player	Reason left	Date Left	New team	Ref.
Lee Hyun-jung	Parted ways	31 July 2025	Nagasaki Velca	
JaQuori McLaughlin	Released	10 October 2025	n/a	

== Awards ==
=== Club awards ===
- Club MVP: JaVale McGee
- Most Improved Player: Daniel Grida
- Player's Player award: Daniel Grida
- Defensive Player: Wani Swaka Lo Buluk
- Coaches' award: Kobe McDowell-White
- Club Person of the Year: Kumar Manix
- Phil Driscoll OAM Volunteer of the Year Award: Bob Purcell

== See also ==
- 2025–26 NBL season
- Illawarra Hawks
