= 2025–26 New Zealand Breakers season =

New Zealand professional basketball season

- NBL Ignite Cup champions
- Head coach: (Finland) Petteri Koponen
- Captain: (United States) Parker Jackson-Cartwright
- Arena: Spark Arena

NBL results
- Record: 13–20 (39.4%)
- Ladder: 7th
- Finals finish: Did not qualify
- Stats at NBL.com.au

Ignite Cup results
- Record: 3–1 (75%)
- Ladder: 2nd
- Ignite Cup finish: Champions (1st title) (Defeated 36ers 111–107)
- All statistics correct as of 22 February 2026.

The 2025–26 New Zealand Breakers season was the 23rd season of the franchise in the National Basketball League (NBL), and their second under the leadership of head coach Petteri Koponen.

== Roster ==
Note: Flags indicate national team eligibility at FIBA-sanctioned events. Players may hold other non-FIBA nationalities not displayed.

2025–26 New Zealand Breakers roster
Players
Coaches

Pos.	No.	Nat.	Name	Ht.	Wt.
G	0	(New Zealand)	McNaught, Alex (DP)	1.83 m (6 ft 0 in)	90 kg (198 lb)
G/F	1	(Mexico)	López, Karim (NS)	2.03 m (6 ft 8 in)
G/F	2	(Australia)	Bairstow, Sean	2.00 m (6 ft 7 in)	93 kg (205 lb)
F/C	3	(New Zealand)	Mennenga, Sam	2.06 m (6 ft 9 in)	109 kg (240 lb)
G	4	(New Zealand)	Le'afa, Izayah (injured)	1.88 m (6 ft 2 in)	90 kg (198 lb)
G	5	(New Zealand)	Britt, Taylor	1.87 m (6 ft 2 in)	77 kg (170 lb)
G	6	(United States)	Jackson-Cartwright, Parker (I & C)	1.80 m (5 ft 11 in)	74 kg (163 lb)
G/F	7	(New Zealand)	Te Rangi, Reuben	1.98 m (6 ft 6 in)	105 kg (231 lb)
G	8	(United States)	Brockington, Izaiah (I)	1.93 m (6 ft 4 in)	86 kg (190 lb)
F/C	9	(United States)	Baker, Robert (injured) (I)	2.08 m (6 ft 10 in)	95 kg (209 lb)
F	12	(New Zealand)	Darling, Max	1.98 m (6 ft 6 in)	118 kg (260 lb)
F/C	15	(New Zealand)	Loe, Robert	2.11 m (6 ft 11 in)	115 kg (254 lb)
C	20	(New Zealand)	Andrew, Jack (DP)	2.08 m (6 ft 10 in)	115 kg (254 lb)
F	21	(New Zealand)	Davison, Carlin	1.97 m (6 ft 6 in)	96 kg (212 lb)
G	34	(New Zealand)	Cooper, Tukaha (DP)	1.87 m (6 ft 2 in)
F	67	(New Zealand)	Judd, Liam (DP)	1.96 m (6 ft 5 in)
G	90	(New Zealand)	Webster, Tai (IRP)	1.93 m (6 ft 4 in)	89 kg (196 lb)

Head coach

- (Finland) Petteri Koponen

Assistant coach(es)

- (Croatia) Mario Dugandzic
- (New Zealand) Judd Flavell
- (New Zealand) Matt Lacey

Strength & conditioning coach(es)

- (United States) Shane Connolly

Legend

- (C) Team captain
- (DP) Development player
- (I) Import player
- (SRP) Special restricted player
- (NS) Next Star player
- Injured

- Roster
Updated: 22 February 2026

=== Depth chart ===
Pos.	Starting 5	Bench 1	Bench 2	Development	Injured
PG	Parker Jackson-Cartwright (I)	Taylor Britt	Alex McNaught (DP)
SG	Izaiah Brockington (I)	Tai Webster (IRP)		Tukaha Cooper (DP)	Izayah Le'afa (injured)
SF	Karim López (NS)	Sean Bairstow	Carlin Davison	Liam Judd (DP)
PF	Reuben Te Rangi	Max Darling			Robert Baker (I) (injured)
C	Robert Loe	Jack Andrew (DP)			Sam Mennenga (injured)

== Standings ==
=== Ladder ===
Pos	2025–26 NBL season											
Pos	Team	Pld	W	L	PCT	Last 5	Streak	Home	Away	PF	PA	PP
1	Sydney Kings	33	24	9	72.73%	5–0	W11	13–4	11–5	3276	2879	113.79%
2	Adelaide 36ers	33	23	10	69.70%	2–3	L1	12–5	11–5	3042	2890	105.26%
3	S.E. Melbourne Phoenix	33	22	11	66.67%	3–2	L1	11–5	11–6	3324	3061	108.59%
4	Perth Wildcats	33	21	12	63.64%	4–1	W1	10–7	11–5	2996	2840	105.49%
5	Melbourne United	33	20	13	60.61%	2–3	W1	11–6	9–7	3041	2905	104.68%
6	Tasmania JackJumpers	33	14	19	42.42%	2–3	L2	6–10	8–9	2873	2884	99.62%
7	New Zealand Breakers	33	13	20	39.39%	2–3	W1	7–9	6–11	3022	3058	98.82%
8	Illawarra Hawks	33	13	20	39.39%	3–2	W2	7–9	6–11	3074	3205	95.91%
9	Cairns Taipans	33	9	24	27.27%	1–4	L2	4–13	5–11	2754	3194	86.22%
10	Brisbane Bullets	33	6	27	18.18%	0–5	L13	2–14	4–13	2710	3196	84.79%

Updated to match(es) played on 20 February 2026. Source: NBL.com.au

The NBL tie-breaker system as outlined in the NBL Rules and Regulations states that in the case of an identical win–loss record, the overall points percentage will determine order of seeding.

=== Ladder progression ===
Leader and qualification to semifinals
Qualification to semifinals
Qualification to play-in
Last place

2025–26 NBL season
Team ╲ Round	1	2	3	4	5	6	7	8	9	10	11	12	13	14	15	16	17	18	19	20	21	22
Adelaide 36ers	—	2	1	2	2	3	3	3	2	2	1	1	1	1	1	1	1	1	1	1	2	2
Brisbane Bullets	3	7	8	9	7	7	7	7	8	8	9	9	9	9	9	10	10	10	10	10	10	10
Cairns Taipans	7	4	7	7	8	10	9	10	10	10	10	10	10	10	10	9	9	9	9	9	9	9
Illawarra Hawks	—	9	9	8	10	8	10	8	7	9	8	8	8	8	7	8	8	7	8	8	8	8
Melbourne United	2	1	2	1	1	1	1	1	1	1	2	2	3	2	3	4	4	4	4	5	5	5
New Zealand Breakers	6	10	10	10	9	9	8	9	9	7	6	7	7	7	8	7	7	8	7	7	7	7
Perth Wildcats	5	6	4	3	6	5	5	5	5	4	4	5	5	5	5	5	5	5	5	4	4	4
S.E. Melbourne Phoenix	1	5	6	4	3	2	2	2	3	3	3	3	2	4	2	2	2	2	3	3	3	3
Sydney Kings	—	8	5	6	5	6	4	4	4	5	5	4	4	3	4	3	3	3	2	2	1	1
Tasmania JackJumpers	4	3	3	5	4	4	6	6	6	6	7	6	6	6	6	6	6	6	6	6	6	6

Updated to match(es) played on 20 February 2026. Source: NBL.com.au

== Game log ==
=== Pre-season ===
The 2025 NBL Blitz will run from 27 to 31 August 2025 with games being played at the AIS Arena, Canberra.

2025 NBL Blitz game log
Total: 2–0 (Home: 1–0; Road: 1–0)
August: 2–0 (Home: 1–0; Road: 1–0)

Game	Date	Team	Score	High points	High rebounds	High assists	Location Attendance	Record
1	29 August	@ S.E. Melbourne	W 101–109	Izaiah Brockington (22)	Izaiah Brockington (13)	Parker Jackson-Cartwright (5)	AIS Arena n/a	1–0
2	31 August	Cairns	W 94–75	Reuben Te Rangi (20)	Reuben Te Rangi (6)	Izayah Le'afa (7)	AIS Arena n/a	2–0

=== Regular season ===
The regular season will begin on 18 September 2025. It will consist of 165 games (33 games each) spread across 22 rounds, with the final game being played on 20 February 2026.

2025–26 game log
Total: 13–20 (Home: 7–9; Road: 6–11)
September: 0–3 (Home: 0–2; Road: 0–1)

Game	Date	Team	Score	High points	High rebounds	High assists	Location Attendance	Record
1	19 September	Brisbane	L 95–104	Brockington, Jackson-Cartwright (16)	Sam Mennenga (8)	Parker Jackson-Cartwright (12)	Spark Arena; 4,443	0–1
2	21 September	@ Melbourne	L 114–82	Izaiah Brockington (21)	López, Brockington (6)	Davison, Jackson-Cartwright (4)	John Cain Arena; 9,101	0–2
3	27 September	Perth	L 78–89	Parker Jackson-Cartwright (18)	López, Mennenga (7)	Parker Jackson-Cartwright (5)	Spark Arena; 4,047	0–3

October: 3–4 (Home: 2–2; Road: 1–2)

Game	Date	Team	Score	High points	High rebounds	High assists	Location Attendance	Record
4	4 October	@ Sydney	L 97–75	Parker Jackson-Cartwright (16)	Sam Mennenga (12)	Parker Jackson-Cartwright (5)	Sydney SuperDome; 10,798	0–4
5	8 October	Illawarra	W 117–88	Jackson-Cartwright, Mennenga (20)	Karim López (9)	Parker Jackson-Cartwright (17)	Spark Arena; 3,101	1–4
6	12 October	S.E. Melbourne	L 81–87	Sam Mennenga (29)	Sam Mennenga (11)	Parker Jackson-Cartwright (9)	Spark Arena; 4,520	1–5
7	17 October	Tasmania	W 82–65	Parker Jackson-Cartwright (21)	Sam Mennenga (8)	Parker Jackson-Cartwright (6)	Spark Arena; 3,212	2–5
8	19 October	@ Melbourne	L 104–88	Izaiah Brockington (25)	Jackson-Cartwright, López (9)	Parker Jackson-Cartwright (9)	John Cain Arena; 8,092	2–6
9	23 October	Brisbane	L 83–84	Sam Mennenga (27)	four players (6)	Parker Jackson-Cartwright (5)	Eventfinda Stadium; 2,841	2–7
10	31 October	@ Illawarra	W 60–102	Sam Mennenga (21)	Sam Mennenga (11)	Parker Jackson-Cartwright (6)	Wollongong Entertainment Centre; 4,080	3–7

November: 2–3 (Home: 0–1; Road: 2–2)

Game	Date	Team	Score	High points	High rebounds	High assists	Location Attendance	Record
11	6 November	Adelaide	L 79–83	Izaiah Brockington (25)	Robert Baker (9)	Parker Jackson-Cartwright (10)	Wolfbrook Arena; 3,859	3–8
12	9 November	@ Sydney	L 79–72	Parker Jackson-Cartwright (23)	Brockington, López (8)	Parker Jackson-Cartwright (7)	Sydney SuperDome; 10,067	3–9
13	12 November	@ Brisbane	W 84–113	Sam Mennenga (25)	Robert Baker (11)	Parker Jackson-Cartwright (7)	Gold Coast Sports Centre; 2,275	4–9
14	15 November	@ Perth	L 88–75	Parker Jackson-Cartwright (22)	Karim López (10)	Parker Jackson-Cartwright (9)	Perth Arena; 12,350	4–10
15	22 November	@ Cairns	W 96–102	Brockington, Mennenga (22)	Izaiah Brockington (11)	Parker Jackson-Cartwright (6)	Cairns Convention Centre; 3,989	5–10

December: 3–3 (Home: 2–0; Road: 1–3)

Game	Date	Team	Score	High points	High rebounds	High assists	Location Attendance	Record
16	3 December	Sydney	W 95–90	Parker Jackson-Cartwright (24)	López, Mennenga (6)	Izaiah Brockington (5)	Claudelands Arena; 2,770	6–10
17	6 December	Tasmania	W 99–86	Izaiah Brockington (22)	Baker, Mennenga (9)	Parker Jackson-Cartwright (12)	Spark Arena; 3,638	7–10
18	13 December	@ S.E. Melbourne	L 92–80	Baker, Jackson-Cartwright (16)	Jackson-Cartwright, Mennenga (9)	Parker Jackson-Cartwright (6)	Gippsland Indoor Stadium; 2,581	7–11
19	19 December	@ Cairns	L 99–95	Sam Mennenga (24)	Sam Mennenga (8)	Parker Jackson-Cartwright (11)	Cairns Convention Centre; 3,749	7–12
20	22 December	@ Brisbane	L 99–85	Parker Jackson-Cartwright (26)	Carlin Davison (7)	Parker Jackson-Cartwright (4)	Brisbane Entertainment Centre; 4,538	7–13
21	26 December	@ Tasmania	W 80–81 (OT)	Sam Mennenga (20)	Jackson-Cartwright, Mennenga (7)	Parker Jackson-Cartwright (10)	Derwent Entertainment Centre; 4,340	8–13

January: 3–4 (Home: 1–3; Road: 2–1)

Game	Date	Team	Score	High points	High rebounds	High assists	Location Attendance	Record
22	4 January	Perth	L 91–99	Sam Mennenga (19)	Jackson-Cartwright, López (7)	Parker Jackson-Cartwright (7)	Spark Arena; 5,141	8–14
23	9 January	Sydney	L 62–103	Karim López (11)	Sam Mennenga (6)	Parker Jackson-Cartwright (3)	Spark Arena; 3,229	8–15
24	11 January	@ Illawarra	W 96–101	Parker Jackson-Cartwright (23)	Parker Jackson-Cartwright (7)	Parker Jackson-Cartwright (8)	Wollongong Entertainment Centre; 5,323	9–15
25	17 January	@ Cairns	W 86–104	Sam Mennenga (28)	Karim López (11)	Parker Jackson-Cartwright (10)	Perth Arena; 7,034	10–15
26	21 January	@ S.E. Melbourne	L 123–116	Sam Mennenga (28)	Karim López (8)	Parker Jackson-Cartwright (9)	State Basketball Centre; 3,422	10–16
27	23 January	Adelaide	L 110–112 (OT)	three players (21)	Sam Mennenga (12)	Parker Jackson-Cartwright (10)	Spark Arena; 3,866	10–17
28	30 January	Melbourne	W 97–95	Karim López (32)	Karim López (8)	three players (3)	Spark Arena; 4,917	11–17

February: 2–3 (Home: 2–1; Road: 0–2)

Game	Date	Team	Score	High points	High rebounds	High assists	Location Attendance	Record
29	1 February	@ Tasmania	L 91–89	Izaiah Brockington (24)	Brockington, Jackson-Cartwright (7)	Parker Jackson-Cartwright (5)	Derwent Entertainment Centre; 4,340	11–18
30	5 February	S.E. Melbourne	L 83–114	Izaiah Brockington (19)	Tai Webster (8)	Parker Jackson-Cartwright (5)	Eventfinda Stadium; 1,703	11–19
31	7 February	Illawarra	W 106–95	Izaiah Brockington (27)	Parker Jackson-Cartwright (8)	Parker Jackson-Cartwright (6)	Spark Arena; 2,750	12–19
32	14 February	@ Adelaide	L 92–89	Parker Jackson-Cartwright (25)	Sean Bairstow (8)	Parker Jackson-Cartwright (7)	Adelaide Entertainment Centre; 10,044	12–20
33	19 February	Cairns	W 115–84	Sam Mennenga (32)	Carlin Davison (11)	Parker Jackson-Cartwright (13)	Eventfinda Stadium; 1,791	13–20
Cup	22 February	@ Adelaide	W 107–111	Parker Jackson-Cartwright (29)	López, Te Rangi (8)	López, Jackson-Cartwright (5)	Gold Coast Convention Centre; 5,078	–

2025–26 season schedule

=== NBL Ignite Cup ===
The NBL introduced the new NBL Ignite Cup tournament for the 2025–26 season, with all games except the championship final counting towards the regular-season standings.

Pos	Team	Pld	W	L	PF	PA	PP	BP	Pts	Qualification
1	Adelaide 36ers	4	3	1	390	329	118.5	12	21	Ignite Cup final
2	New Zealand Breakers	4	3	1	441	385	114.5	11	20	Ignite Cup final
3	Perth Wildcats	4	3	1	399	365	109.3	9.5	18.5	
4	Melbourne United	4	2	2	390	359	108.6	9.5	15.5	
5	Tasmania JackJumpers	4	2	2	349	338	103.3	8.5	14.5	
6	S.E. Melbourne Phoenix	4	2	2	408	402	101.5	8	14	
7	Illawarra Hawks	4	2	2	372	397	93.7	7	13	
8	Brisbane Bullets	4	1	3	334	411	81.3	6	9	
9	Sydney Kings	4	1	3	350	381	91.9	5	8	
10	Cairns Taipans	4	1	3	340	406	83.7	3.5	6.5	

Updated to match(es) played on 28 January 2026. Source: Ignitecup.com.au

== Transactions ==
Free agency began on 4 April 2025.

=== Re-signed ===
Player	Date Signed	Contract	Ref.
Parker Jackson-Cartwright	23 June 2025	2-year deal	

=== Additions ===
Player	Date Signed	Contract	Former team	Ref.
Reuben Te Rangi	8 April 2025	2-year deal	Tasmania JackJumpers	
Izayah Le'afa	10 April 2025	2-year deal	Sydney Kings	
Taylor Britt	14 April 2025	2-year deal (club option)	Canterbury Rams	
Robert Loe	15 April 2025	1-year deal	Melbourne United	
Izaiah Brockington	28 July 2025	1-year deal	Vancouver Bandits	

=== Subtractions ===
Player	Reason left	Date Left	New Team	Ref.
Mitch McCarron	Retired	15 May 2025	n/a	
Tacko Fall	Released	22 July 2025	Nanjing Monkey Kings	

== Awards ==
=== Club awards ===
- Club MVP: Parker Jackson-Cartwright
- Fan's Memorable Moment: Sam Mennenga
- Defensive Player: Izaiah Brockington
- Member’s Choice Award: Parker Jackson-Cartwright
- Clubman Award: Bryce Abernethy
- Blackwell Community Cup: Jayden Boucher

== See also ==
- 2025–26 NBL season
- New Zealand Breakers
