= 2025–26 Cairns Taipans season =

Australian professional basketball season

- Head coach: (Australia) Adam Forde
- Captain: (New Zealand) Sam Waardenburg
- Arena: Cairns Convention Centre

NBL results
- Record: 9–24 (27.3%)
- Ladder: 9th
- Finals finish: Did not qualify
- Stats at NBL.com.au

Ignite Cup results
- Record: 1–3 (25%)
- Ladder: 10th
- Ignite Cup finish: Did not qualify
- All statistics correct as of 20 February 2026.

The 2025–26 Cairns Taipans season was the 27th season of the franchise in the National Basketball League (NBL), and the fifth season under the leadership of their head coach Adam Forde. After initially parting ways with the Taipans following the 2024–25 season, Forde re-signed as head coach on 13 June 2025.

== Roster ==
Note: Flags indicate national team eligibility at FIBA-sanctioned events. Players may hold other non-FIBA nationalities not displayed.

2025–26 Cairns Taipans roster
Players
Coaches

Pos.	No.	Nat.	Name	Ht.	Wt.
G	0	(New Zealand)	King, Mojave (IRP)	1.96 m (6 ft 5 in)	88 kg (194 lb)
G	1	(Australia)	McVeigh, Lloyd (DP)	1.98 m (6 ft 6 in)	92 kg (203 lb)
G	2	(Australia)	Smith, Reyne	1.88 m (6 ft 2 in)	86 kg (190 lb)
F	3	(South Sudan)	Mag, Mawot (injured)	2.01 m (6 ft 7 in)	97 kg (214 lb)
G	4	(Australia)	Adnam, Kyle	1.86 m (6 ft 1 in)	84 kg (185 lb)
F	5	(United States)	Schofield, Admiral (I)	1.96 m (6 ft 5 in)	109 kg (240 lb)
G	6	(Australia)	Stattmann, Kody	2.02 m (6 ft 8 in)	91 kg (201 lb)
F	7	(Australia)	Dennis, Kian (IRP)	1.97 m (6 ft 6 in)
F	9	(Australia)	McVeigh, Jack	2.03 m (6 ft 8 in)	93 kg (205 lb)
C	10	(Australia)	Richardson, Jed (DP)
F	11	(Australia)	Higgins-Titsha, Alex (injured)	2.01 m (6 ft 7 in)	81 kg (179 lb)
G	12	(United States)	Andrews, Andrew (I)	1.88 m (6 ft 2 in)	91 kg (201 lb)
F	14	(Australia)	Galloway, Kyrin	2.03 m (6 ft 8 in)	98 kg (216 lb)
F	21	(New Zealand)	Waardenburg, Sam (injured) (C)	2.08 m (6 ft 10 in)	100 kg (220 lb)
C	24	(United States)	Lee, Marcus (I)	2.11 m (6 ft 11 in)	99 kg (218 lb)
G	38	(Australia)	Barker, Lachlan (NRP)	1.88 m (6 ft 2 in)	86 kg (190 lb)

Head coach

- (Australia) Adam Forde

Assistant coach(es)

- (Australia) Angus Henskens
- (Australia) Michael Lake
- (Australia) Will Lopez

Legend

- (C) Team captain
- (DP) Development player
- (IN) Inactive
- (I) Import player
- (IRP) Injury replacement player
- (NRP) Nominated replacement player
- Injured

- Roster
Updated: 12 February 2026

=== Depth chart ===
Pos.	Starting 5	Bench 1	Development	Injured
PG	Andrew Andrews (I)	Kyle Adnam	Lachlan Barker (NRP)	Reyne Smith (injured)
SG	Mojave King (IRP)	Kody Stattmann	Lloyd McVeigh (DP)
SF	Admiral Schofield (I)			Mawot Mag (injured)
PF	Jack McVeigh	Kyrin Galloway	Kian Dennis (IRP)	Alex Higgins-Titsha (injured)
C	Marcus Lee (I)	Jed Richardson (DP)		Sam Waardenburg (injured)

== Standings ==
=== Ladder ===
Pos	2025–26 NBL season											
Pos	Team	Pld	W	L	PCT	Last 5	Streak	Home	Away	PF	PA	PP
1	Sydney Kings	33	24	9	72.73%	5–0	W11	13–4	11–5	3276	2879	113.79%
2	Adelaide 36ers	33	23	10	69.70%	2–3	L1	12–5	11–5	3042	2890	105.26%
3	S.E. Melbourne Phoenix	33	22	11	66.67%	3–2	L1	11–5	11–6	3324	3061	108.59%
4	Perth Wildcats	33	21	12	63.64%	4–1	W1	10–7	11–5	2996	2840	105.49%
5	Melbourne United	33	20	13	60.61%	2–3	W1	11–6	9–7	3041	2905	104.68%
6	Tasmania JackJumpers	33	14	19	42.42%	2–3	L2	6–10	8–9	2873	2884	99.62%
7	New Zealand Breakers	33	13	20	39.39%	2–3	W1	7–9	6–11	3022	3058	98.82%
8	Illawarra Hawks	33	13	20	39.39%	3–2	W2	7–9	6–11	3074	3205	95.91%
9	Cairns Taipans	33	9	24	27.27%	1–4	L2	4–13	5–11	2754	3194	86.22%
10	Brisbane Bullets	33	6	27	18.18%	0–5	L13	2–14	4–13	2710	3196	84.79%

Updated to match(es) played on 20 February 2026. Source: NBL.com.au

The NBL tie-breaker system as outlined in the NBL Rules and Regulations states that in the case of an identical win–loss record, the overall points percentage will determine order of seeding.

=== Ladder progression ===
Leader and qualification to semifinals
Qualification to semifinals
Qualification to play-in
Last place

2025–26 NBL season
Team ╲ Round	1	2	3	4	5	6	7	8	9	10	11	12	13	14	15	16	17	18	19	20	21	22
Adelaide 36ers	—	2	1	2	2	3	3	3	2	2	1	1	1	1	1	1	1	1	1	1	2	2
Brisbane Bullets	3	7	8	9	7	7	7	7	8	8	9	9	9	9	9	10	10	10	10	10	10	10
Cairns Taipans	7	4	7	7	8	10	9	10	10	10	10	10	10	10	10	9	9	9	9	9	9	9
Illawarra Hawks	—	9	9	8	10	8	10	8	7	9	8	8	8	8	7	8	8	7	8	8	8	8
Melbourne United	2	1	2	1	1	1	1	1	1	1	2	2	3	2	3	4	4	4	4	5	5	5
New Zealand Breakers	6	10	10	10	9	9	8	9	9	7	6	7	7	7	8	7	7	8	7	7	7	7
Perth Wildcats	5	6	4	3	6	5	5	5	5	4	4	5	5	5	5	5	5	5	5	4	4	4
S.E. Melbourne Phoenix	1	5	6	4	3	2	2	2	3	3	3	3	2	4	2	2	2	2	3	3	3	3
Sydney Kings	—	8	5	6	5	6	4	4	4	5	5	4	4	3	4	3	3	3	2	2	1	1
Tasmania JackJumpers	4	3	3	5	4	4	6	6	6	6	7	6	6	6	6	6	6	6	6	6	6	6

Updated to match(es) played on 20 February 2026. Source: NBL.com.au

== Game log ==
=== Pre-season ===
The 2025 NBL Blitz will run from 27 to 31 August 2025 with games being played at the AIS Arena, Canberra.

2025 NBL Blitz game log
Total: 0–2 (Home: 0–1; Road: 0–1)
August: 0–2 (Home: 0–1; Road: 0–1)

Game	Date	Team	Score	High points	High rebounds	High assists	Location Attendance	Record
1	28 August	Tasmania	L 95–97 (OT)	Admiral Schofield (24)	Marcus Lee (11)	Kody Stattmann (6)	AIS Arena n/a	0–1
2	31 August	@ New Zealand	L 94–75	Kody Stattmann (15)	Alex Higgins-Titsha (10)	Adnam, Waardenburg (4)	AIS Arena n/a	0–2

=== Regular season ===
The regular season will begin on 18 September 2025. It will consist of 165 games (33 games each) spread across 22 rounds, with the final game being played on 20 February 2026.

2025–26 game log
Total: 9–24 (Home: 4–13; Road: 5–11)
September: 2–1 (Home: 1–0; Road: 1–1)

Game	Date	Team	Score	High points	High rebounds	High assists	Location Attendance	Record
1	20 September	@ S.E. Melbourne	L 114–77	Reyne Smith (19)	Marcus Lee (12)	Kody Stattman (5)	John Cain Arena; 5,371	0–1
2	26 September	Brisbane	W 83–82	McVeigh, Schofield (19)	Jack McVeigh (9)	Jack McVeigh (9)	Cairns Convention Centre; 4,052	1–1
3	28 September	@ Sydney	W 74–77	Jack McVeigh (24)	Jack McVeigh (9)	Andrew Andrews (7)	Sydney SuperDome; 8,536	2–1

October: 0–7 (Home: 0–5; Road: 0–2)

Game	Date	Team	Score	High points	High rebounds	High assists	Location Attendance	Record
4	2 October	Adelaide	L 79–110	Admiral Schofield (19)	Jack McVeigh (8)	Andrew Andrews (7)	Cairns Convention Centre; 4,213	2–2
5	10 October	Perth	L 77–80	Andrew Andrews (21)	Marcus Lee (12)	Jack McVeigh (6)	Cairns Convention Centre; 3,985	2–3
6	12 October	@ Melbourne	L 95–60	Alex Higgins-Titsha (16)	Marcus Lee (7)	Andrew Andrews (6)	John Cain Arena; 9,233	2–4
7	18 October	Adelaide	L 86–91	Andrew Andrews (23)	Galloway, Schofield (9)	Andrew Andrews (7)	Cairns Convention Centre; 4,004	2–5
8	22 October	Perth	L 78–110	Admiral Schofield (16)	Kyrin Galloway (8)	Reyne Smith (5)	Cairns Convention Centre; 3,317	2–6
9	24 October	Melbourne	L 67–94	Andrews, Smith (13)	Lee, Mag (10)	Andrew Andrews (5)	Cairns Convention Centre; 3,505	2–7
10	30 October	@ Brisbane	L 113–85	Jack McVeigh (23)	Marcus Lee (8)	Andrew Andrews (10)	Brisbane Entertainment Centre; 3,684	2–8

November: 1–4 (Home: 0–3; Road: 1–1)

Game	Date	Team	Score	High points	High rebounds	High assists	Location Attendance	Record
11	1 November	@ Tasmania	W 69–75	Andrew Andrews (27)	four players (6)	Andrew Andrews (3)	Silverdome; 3,255	3–8
12	7 November	Illawarra	L 90–107	Mojave King (32)	Jack McVeigh (8)	Andrews, McVeigh (8)	Cairns Convention Centre; 4,025	3–9
13	14 November	S.E. Melbourne	L 90–101	Jack McVeigh (22)	Admiral Schofield (8)	Andrew Andrews (10)	Cairns Convention Centre; 3,567	3–10
14	16 November	@ Adelaide	L 105–101 (OT)	Jack McVeigh (39)	Marcus Lee (9)	Andrew Andrews (8)	Adelaide Entertainment Centre; 9,878	3–11
15	22 November	New Zealand	L 96–102	Jack McVeigh (35)	Jack McVeigh (7)	Andrew Andrews (9)	Cairns Convention Centre; 3,989	3–12

December: 1–5 (Home: 1–2; Road: 0–3)

Game	Date	Team	Score	High points	High rebounds	High assists	Location Attendance	Record
16	6 December	@ Illawarra	W 76–93	Andrew Andrews (27)	Kyrin Galloway (14)	Andrew Andrews (6)	Wollongong Entertainment Centre; 3,946	4–12
17	13 December	Tasmania	L 68–81	Jack McVeigh (24)	Jack McVeigh (8)	Andrew Andrews (8)	Cairns Convention Centre; 3,876	4–13
18	19 December	New Zealand	W 99–95	Jack McVeigh (47)	Sam Waardenburg (10)	Andrew Andrews (9)	Cairns Convention Centre; 3,749	5–13
19	21 December	@ Sydney	L 119–77	Andrews, Stattmann (14)	Marcus Lee (6)	Andrew Andrews (9)	Sydney SuperDome; 9,124	5–14
20	24 December	@ Adelaide	L 93–73	Sam Waardenburg (19)	five players (5)	Andrew Andrews (6)	Adelaide Entertainment Centre; 10,006	5–15
21	31 December	S.E. Melbourne	L 96–111	Jack McVeigh (26)	Andrew Andrews (7)	Andrew Andrews (9)	Cairns Convention Centre; 4,870	5–16

January: 3–4 (Home: 2–1; Road: 1–3)

Game	Date	Team	Score	High points	High rebounds	High assists	Location Attendance	Record
22	3 January	@ Illawarra	L 96–78	Sam Waardenburg (17)	Kyrin Galloway (9)	Andrew Andrews (6)	Wollongong Entertainment Centre; 4,921	5–17
23	7 January	@ Melbourne	W 92–93	McVeigh, Waardenburg (20)	McVeigh, Waardenburg (9)	Andrew Andrews (13)	Bendigo Stadium; 4,003	6–17
24	12 January	Brisbane	W 88–83	Jack McVeigh (25)	Jack McVeigh (6)	Andrew Andrews (13)	Cairns Convention Centre; 3,872	7–17
25	17 January	New Zealand	L 86–104	King, Schofield (19)	Jack McVeigh (8)	Jack McVeigh (8)	Perth Arena; 7,034	7–18
26	22 January	@ Perth	L 106–69	Jack McVeigh (34)	three players (4)	Andrew Andrews (8)	Perth Arena; 11,377	7–19
27	24 January	@ S.E. Melbourne	L 118–91	Jack McVeigh (21)	Mojave King (8)	Andrew Andrews (11)	State Basketball Centre; 3,422	7–20
28	30 January	Tasmania	W 96–93 (OT)	Jack McVeigh (40)	Marcus Lee (10)	Kyle Adnam (4)	Cairns Convention Centre; 3,862	8–20

February: 1–4 (Home: 0–2; Road: 1–2)

Game	Date	Team	Score	High points	High rebounds	High assists	Location Attendance	Record
29	1 February	Sydney	L 92–106	Lachlan Barker (18)	Mojave King (9)	Andrew Andrews (10)	Cairns Convention Centre; 4,002	8–21
30	6 February	@ Perth	L 98–84	Andrew Andrews (25)	Mojave King (8)	Andrew Andrews (7)	Perth Arena; 11,161	8–22
31	8 February	@ Brisbane	W 72–81	Jack McVeigh (22)	Mojave King (11)	Andrew Andrews (10)	Brisbane Entertainment Centre; 5,443	9–22
32	12 February	Melbourne	L 85–89	Jack McVeigh (25)	Andrew Andrews (9)	Andrew Andrews (7)	Cairns Convention Centre; 3,650	9–23
33	19 February	@ New Zealand	L 115–84	Andrew Andrews (24)	Jack McVeigh (7)	Andrew Andrews (7)	Eventfinda Stadium; 1,791	9–24

2025–26 season schedule

=== NBL Ignite Cup ===
The NBL introduced the new NBL Ignite Cup tournament for the 2025–26 season, with all games except the championship final counting towards the regular-season standings.

Pos	Team	Pld	W	L	PF	PA	PP	BP	Pts	Qualification
1	Adelaide 36ers	4	3	1	390	329	118.5	12	21	Ignite Cup final
2	New Zealand Breakers	4	3	1	441	385	114.5	11	20	Ignite Cup final
3	Perth Wildcats	4	3	1	399	365	109.3	9.5	18.5	
4	Melbourne United	4	2	2	390	359	108.6	9.5	15.5	
5	Tasmania JackJumpers	4	2	2	349	338	103.3	8.5	14.5	
6	S.E. Melbourne Phoenix	4	2	2	408	402	101.5	8	14	
7	Illawarra Hawks	4	2	2	372	397	93.7	7	13	
8	Brisbane Bullets	4	1	3	334	411	81.3	6	9	
9	Sydney Kings	4	1	3	350	381	91.9	5	8	
10	Cairns Taipans	4	1	3	340	406	83.7	3.5	6.5	

Updated to match(es) played on 28 January 2026. Source: Ignitecup.com.au

== Transactions ==
Free agency began on 4 April 2025.

=== Re-signed ===
Player	Date Signed	Contract	Ref.
Alex Higgins-Titsha	25 March 2025	1-year deal	
Kyrin Galloway	27 March 2025	1-year deal	
Sam Waardenburg	29 March 2025	1-year deal	
Kyle Adnam	31 March 2025	1-year deal	

=== Additions ===
Player	Date Signed	Contract	Former team	Ref.
Jack McVeigh	5 August 2025	2-year deal (mutual option)	Houston Rockets	
Admiral Schofield	13 August 2025	1-year deal	LDLC ASVEL	
Ashton Hagans	13 August 2025	1-year deal	Xinjiang Flying Tigers	
Reyne Smith	13 August 2025	2-year deal (club option)	Louisville	
Marcus Lee	13 August 2025	1-year deal	Melbourne United	
Mawot Mag	13 August 2025	2-year deal (club option)	BYU	
Andrew Andrews	15 September 2025	1-year deal	BC Wolves	
Mojave King	29 October 2025	1-year deal (IRP)	New Zealand Breakers	

=== Subtractions ===
Player	Reason left	Date Left	New Team	Ref.
Ashton Hagans	Mutual release	15 September 2025	TBC	

== Awards ==
=== Club awards ===
- Club MVP: Jack McVeigh
- Defensive Player: Kyrin Galloway
- Players’ Player: Andrew Andrews
- Members’ Choice MVP: Jack McVeigh
- Coaches Award: Lachlan Barker
- Commitment to Community: Jed Richardson
- Club Person of the Year: John Richardson

== See also ==
- 2025–26 NBL season
