= Tyler Robertson (basketball) =

Australian basketball player (born 2000)

No. 3 – Sydney Kings
- Position: Shooting guard / small forward
- League: NBL

Personal information
- Born: July 25, 2000 (age 26) Melbourne, Victoria, Australia
- Listed height: 198 cm (6 ft 6 in)
- Listed weight: 107 kg (236 lb)

Career information
- High school: Rowville Secondary College (Melbourne, Victoria); Box Hill Senior Secondary College (Melbourne, Victoria)
- College: Eastern Washington (2019–2021); Portland (2021–2024)
- NBA draft: 2024: undrafted
- Playing career: 2017–present

Career history
- 2017–2019: Dandenong Rangers
- 2024–present: Sydney Kings
- 2025: Casey Cavaliers
- 2026: Sutherland Sharks

Career highlights
- NBL champion (2026); NBL1 East All-Star Five (2026); 2× Second-team All-WCC (2022, 2024); Big Sky Sixth Man of the Year (2021)

Tyler James Robertson (born 25 July 2000) is an Australian professional basketball player for the Sydney Kings of the National Basketball League (NBL). He played college basketball for Eastern Washington and Portland before debuting in the NBL in 2024 with the Kings.

== Early life and career ==
Robertson was born in Melbourne, Victoria, where he attended Rowville Secondary College in 2015 and Box Hill Senior Secondary College between 2016 and 2019. With Box Hill, he won four straight Victorian titles and an Australian crown in 2017. He started playing basketball with the Warrandyte Venom and Dandenong Rangers before going on to represent Victoria Metropolitan from 2015 to 2018, which led to two gold medals and one silver medal as captain of the side.

Robertson was selected to play for Australia at the 2017 under-17 Oceania Championship and the 2018 under-18 Asia Cup, winning gold in both tournaments. At the 2017 under-17 Oceania Championship, he started every game and averaged 12.6 points. 5.6 rebounds and 5 assists per game. In 2019, he won another gold medal with Victoria at the under 20s Australian Championships and helped the Australian Emus finish ninth at the FIBA under-19 World Cup in Heraklion, Greece, with Robertson averaging four points, 1.7 rebounds and 1.1 assists in seven games.

In 2017, Robertson debuted in the South East Australian Basketball League (SEABL) for the Dandenong Rangers, playing two games. In 2018, he averaged 3.8 points and 1.1 rebounds in 17 SEABL games for the Rangers. In 2019, he played for the Rangers in the inaugural NBL1 season, averaging 8.2 points and 1.8 rebounds in 13 games.

== College career ==
In 2019, Robertson moved to the United States to begin his college basketball career with the Eastern Washington Eagles. As a freshman in 2019–20, he played in 26 games and averaged 8.1 minutes, 2.2 points and 1.4 rebounds per game. As a sophomore in 2020–21, he was named the Big Sky Sixth Man of the Year after averaging 11.1 points, 3.6 rebounds and 3.0 assists in 23 games.

In 2021, Robertson transferred to Portland. In the 2021–22 season, he earned second-team All-WCC honours and led the team in scoring (15.3), rebounds (6.4) and assists (4.5).

In the 2022–23 season, Robertson earned All-WCC honorable mention and led the team in scoring (15.6) and assists (5.3) and finished second in rebounds (5.5).

In the 2023–24 season, Robertson earned second-team All-WCC honours for the second time in three years. He finished the regular season ranked third in the WCC in scoring (16.5), fifth in assists per game (3.7) and free throw percentage (.808), seventh in field goal percentage (.451), eighth in assist-to-turnover ratio (1.6), 10th in three-pointers made (58) and second in minutes per game (35.3). He had a league high-tying 34 points against Santa Clara.

== Professional career ==
On 23 April 2024, Robertson signed a three-year deal with the Sydney Kings of the National Basketball League (NBL), with the final year being a team option. In July 2024, he played for the Washington Wizards in the 2024 NBA Summer League. He made his debut for the Kings against the Brisbane Bullets on 5 October 2024, finishing with nine points, two rebounds, one assist, and one block on 4-for-7 shooting. In the 2024–25 NBL season, Robertson averaged 3.5 points, 1.3 rebounds and 1.0 assists in 22 games.

Robertson joined the Casey Cavaliers of the NBL1 South for the 2025 NBL1 season. In 14 games, he averaged 17.1 points, 4.8 rebounds, 2.6 assists and 1.1 steals per game.

On 25 February 2026, Robertson was ruled out for the rest of the 2025–26 NBL season after suffering a high grade AC joint injury during the last regular season game against the Brisbane Bullets.

In May 2026, Robertson joined the Sutherland Sharks of the NBL1 East for the rest of the 2026 NBL1 season. He was named NBL1 East All-Star Five. He helped the Sharks reach the NBL1 East Grand Final, where they lost 76–64 to the Norths Bears despite Robertson's game-high 29 points.

== National team career ==
In June 2024, Robertson played for the Australian Boomers at the Nissay Cup in Japan.

== College statistics ==
College basketball statistics
Year	GP	GS	MIN	FG%	3P%	FT%	REB	AST	BLK	STL	PF	TO	PTS
2019–20	26	0	8.0	38.5	35.5	43.8	1.4	0.5	0.0	0.3	0.9	0.6	2.2
2020–21	23	6	25.3	47.0	38.0	82.3	3.6	3.0	0.0	0.7	2.0	1.4	11.1
2021–22	32	32	35.8	40.6	35.8	88.3	6.4	4.5	0.3	1.3	2.3	2.5	15.3
2022–23	32	32	34.2	39.8	32.8	78.4	5.5	5.3	0.3	0.8	1.9	3.0	15.6
2023–24	33	33	35.6	45.2	37.2	81.1	4.5	3.8	0.2	0.8	2.0	2.3	16.9
