= Makuach Maluach =

Australian basketball player

No. 15 – Sydney Kings
- Position: Guard
- League: NBL

Personal information
- Born: 4 May 1998 (age 28) Uganda
- Listed height: 196 cm (6 ft 5 in)
- Listed weight: 89 kg (196 lb)

Career information
- High school: Newington College (Sydney, Australia)
- College: New Mexico (2017–2021)
- NBA draft: 2021: undrafted
- Playing career: 2021–present

Career history
- 2021–2022: Kouvot
- 2022–2024: Darwin Salties
- 2022–2023: Melbourne United
- 2023–present: Sydney Kings
- 2025: Mackay Meteors

Career highlights
- NBL champion (2026); Third-team All-Mountain West (2021)

Makuach Maker Maluach (born 4 May 1998) is an Australian professional basketball player for the Sydney Kings of the National Basketball League (NBL). He played college basketball in the United States for the New Mexico Lobos from 2017 to 2021. Maluach started his professional career in Finland with Kouvot during the 2021–22 season. He began his NBL career with Melbourne United in 2022 and joined the Kings the following season. Maluach won an NBL championship with the Kings in 2026.

== Early life ==
Maluach was born in Uganda as the fourth of six brothers. He is of South Sudanese descent. Maluach and his family moved to Armidale, Australia, in 2009 as refugees. He started playing basketball the following year when he was aged 12. Maluach attended Newington College in Sydney.

== College basketball career ==
Maluach received a scholarship to play college basketball in the United States for the New Mexico Lobos in 2017. He was selected to the All-Mountain West Conference third-team as a senior in 2021. Maluach was eligible for a fifth year but decided to begin his professional career and sign with an agent. He declared for the 2021 NBA draft but was not selected.

== Professional career ==
On 27 August 2021, Maluach signed with Kouvot of the Korisliiga in Finland. He averaged 13.6 points and 5 rebounds per game.

Maluach played for the Darwin Salties of the NBL1 North in 2022. He gained attention for a poster dunk he made in a game against the RedCity Roar.

On 20 May 2022, Maluach signed a one-year contract with Melbourne United of the National Basketball League (NBL).

Maluach returned to the Salties for the 2023 NBL1 North season and averaged 22.5 points, 8.6 rebounds and 3.2 assists per game.

On 12 April 2023, Maluach signed a two-year contract with the Sydney Kings of the NBL.

On 30 January 2024, Maluach re-signed with the Salties for the 2024 NBL1 North season. On 22 April 2025, Maluach signed with the Mackay Meteors for the NBL1 North season.

On 28 April 2025, Maluach re-signed with the Kings on a one-year deal. He had a breakout year during the 2025–26 season when he averaged an NBL career-best 8.4 points and 3.1 rebounds per game which earned him a nomination for the NBL Most Improved Player Award. The Kings won the NBL championship in 2026. On 29 April 2026, Maluach re-signed with the Kings on a two-year deal.
