= Isaac White (basketball) =

Australian basketball player

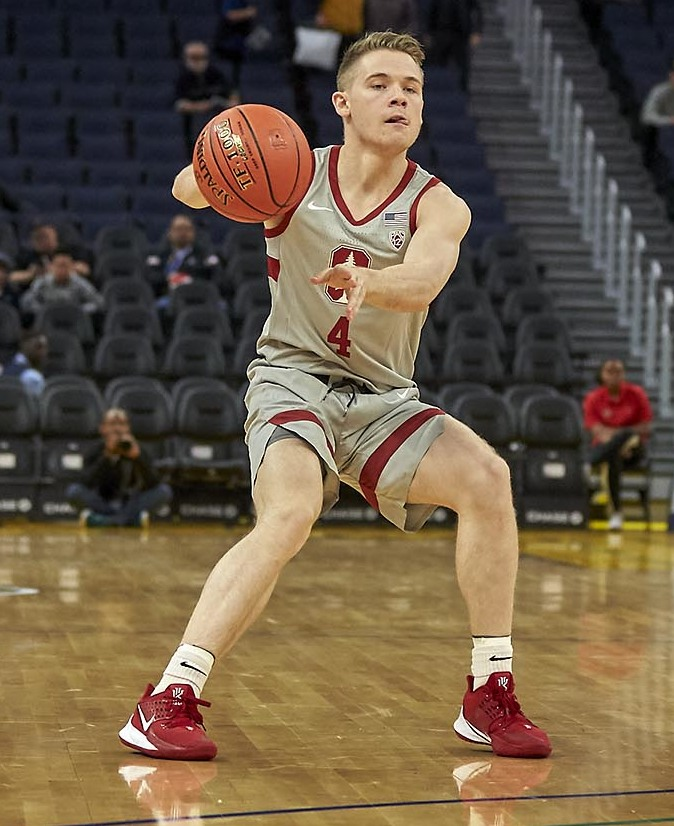
- White with Stanford in 2019

No. 2 – Adelaide 36ers
- Position: Point guard
- League: NBL

Personal information
- Born: 22 June 1998 (age 28) Adelaide, South Australia, Australia
- Listed height: 188 cm (6 ft 2 in)
- Listed weight: 85 kg (187 lb)

Career information
- High school: Sacred Heart College (Adelaide, South Australia)
- College: Stanford (2017–2020)
- NBA draft: 2021: undrafted
- Playing career: 2016–present

Career history
- 2016–2017: Sturt Sabres
- 2020–2022: Illawarra Hawks
- 2021–2022: Ipswich Force
- 2022–2023: Tasmania JackJumpers
- 2023–2024: Mackay Meteors
- 2023–2025: Brisbane Bullets
- 2025–2026: Rockingham Flames
- 2025–present: Adelaide 36ers

Career highlights
- NBL1 West champion (2026); NBL1 North champion (2024); NBL1 West Grand Final MVP (2026); 2× NBL1 West Most Valuable Player (2025, 2026); 2× All-NBL1 West First Team (2025, 2026); 2× All-NBL1 North First Team (2023, 2024)
Medals
Men's basketball
Representing Australia
Universiade
Bronze medal – third place	2019 Italy	Team

Isaac Lewis White (born 22 June 1998) is an Australian professional basketball player for the Adelaide 36ers of the National Basketball League (NBL). He played college basketball for the Stanford Cardinal for three seasons, before graduating and signing to play basketball in Australia professionally.

== Early life and career ==
White was born in Adelaide, South Australia, as the youngest of two siblings. He played for the Sturt Sabres in the South Australian Premier League in 2016 and 2017 and scored 65 points in a game against West Adelaide. White led South Australia to win the 2017 Australian U20 National Championship and led the tournament in scoring with 20.9 points per game.

== College career ==
In 2017, White moved to the United States to play college basketball for the Stanford Cardinal.

On 20 November 2017, White scored a career-high 20 points in a loss to the North Carolina Tar Heels. As a freshman, he averaged 5.5 points and 1.2 rebounds per game, starting nine of the team's 33 contests. He averaged 3.1 points and 1.0 rebound per game as a sophomore. White was named to the 2019 Pac-12 All-Academic Team. As a junior in 2019–20, he averaged 4.2 points per game. White graduated from Stanford after three seasons and initially decided to graduate transfer to California Baptist. However, he instead decided to pursue professional opportunities.

== Professional career ==
=== Illawarra Hawks and Ipswich Force (2020–2022) ===
On 24 July 2020, White signed a one-year deal with the Illawarra Hawks of the National Basketball League (NBL). After playing for the Ipswich Force during the 2021 NBL1 North season, he re-joined Hawks for the 2021–22 NBL season. Following the NBL season, he re-joined the Force for the 2022 NBL1 North season.

=== Tasmania JackJumpers (2022–2023) ===
On 4 August 2022, White signed with the Tasmania JackJumpers ahead of the 2022–23 NBL season as an injury replacement for Clint Steindl. His deal was converted to a development player contract on 28 September 2022.

=== Mackay Meteors and Brisbane Bullets (2023–2025) ===
Following the 2022–23 NBL season, White joined the Mackay Meteors for the 2023 NBL1 North season. He was named to the All-NBL1 North First Team.

On 31 March 2023, White signed a two-year deal with the Brisbane Bullets.

With the Meteors in the 2024 NBL1 season, White was again named to the NBL1 North First Team and helped the team win the NBL1 North championship. He was team captain and averaged 24.6 points, 5.6 rebounds and 4.9 assists per game.

On 10 April 2024, White's contract for the 2024–25 NBL season was exercised by the Bullets. On 24 December 2024, he scored 18 of his career-high 22 points in the first 12 minutes of the Bullets' 111–90 win over the Adelaide 36ers.

=== Rockingham Flames and Adelaide 36ers (2025–present) ===
White joined the Rockingham Flames of the NBL1 West for the 2025 season. On 18 July, he recorded 47 points, 13 rebounds and nine assists in a 105–102 overtime win over the Willetton Tigers. He was named NBL1 West Most Valuable Player and All-NBL1 West First Team. The Flames reached the preliminary final, where they lost 99–97 to the Warwick Senators despite White's game-high 38 points.

On 5 April 2025, White signed a two-year deal with the Adelaide 36ers. In game one of the 2025–26 Championship Series against the Sydney Kings, White scored a team-high 11 points in a 112–68 loss.

White re-joined the Flames for the 2026 NBL1 West season. He was named NBL1 West Most Valuable Player and All-NBL1 West First Team for the second straight year. He helped the Flames reach the NBL1 West Grand Final with 32 points in a 116–102 win over the Cockburn Cougars in the preliminary final. In the grand final, he scored a game-high 19 points in a 66–62 victory over the Geraldton Buccaneers to win the NBL1 West championship and grand final MVP honours.

== National team career ==
At the 2016 FIBA U18 Oceania Tournament, White averaged 14.8 points, 6.8 rebounds, and 3.5 assists per game. In 2019, he helped Australia win bronze at the Summer Universiade in Italy.

In February 2025, White was named in the Australian Boomers squad for two FIBA Asia Cup qualifiers.

In February 2026, White was named in the Boomers squad for two FIBA World Cup Asian qualifiers.

== Career statistics ==
Legend
GP	Games played	GS	Games started	MPG	Minutes per game
FG%	Field goal percentage	3P%	3-point field goal percentage	FT%	Free throw percentage
RPG	Rebounds per game	APG	Assists per game	SPG	Steals per game
BPG	Blocks per game	PPG	Points per game	**Bold**	Career high

=== College ===
Year	Team	GP	GS	MPG	FG%	3P%	FT%	RPG	APG	SPG	BPG	PPG
2017–18	Stanford	**33**	**9**	**16.7**	.368	.339	.750	1.2	**.8**	.2	.0	**5.5**
2018–19	Stanford	30	4	8.6	.426	.393	.667	1.0	.3	.2	.0	3.1
2019–20	Stanford	31	0	14.5	**.442**	**.408**	**.762**	**1.7**	.7	**.3**	.0	4.2
Career		94	13	13.4	.403	.372	.734	1.3	.6	.2	.0	4.3
