= Lat Mayen =

South Sudanese-Australian basketball player

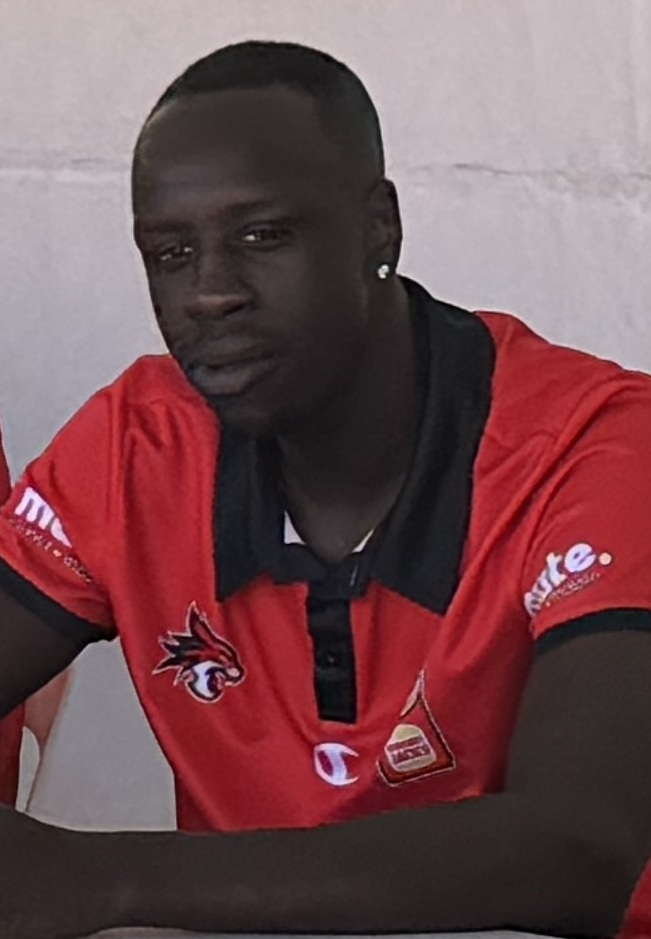
- Mayen with the Perth Wildcats in 2026

No. 11 – Brisbane Bullets
- Position: Forward
- League: NBL

Personal information
- Born: 16 August 1998 (age 28) South Sudan
- Listed height: 206 cm (6 ft 9 in)
- Listed weight: 92 kg (203 lb)

Career information
- High school: Concordia College (Adelaide, South Australia)
- College: TCU (2018–2019); Chipola (2019–2020); Nebraska (2020–2022)
- NBA draft: 2023: undrafted
- Playing career: 2016–present

Career history
- 2016–2017: BA Centre of Excellence
- 2022: Cairns Marlins
- 2022–2024: Cairns Taipans
- 2023: Bendigo Braves
- 2024: Wellington Saints
- 2024–2025: Adelaide 36ers
- 2025: West Adelaide Bearcats
- 2025–2026: Perth Wildcats
- 2026: East Perth Eagles
- 2026–present: Brisbane Bullets

Career highlights
- NBL1 Central champion (2025); First-team All-Panhandle (2020)

Lat Nai Mayen Nai (born 16 August 1998) is a South Sudanese-Australian professional basketball player for the Brisbane Bullets of the National Basketball League (NBL). He played college basketball for three different colleges between 2018 and 2022, finishing with a two-year stint with the Nebraska Cornhuskers. He began his professional career with the Cairns Taipans of the NBL in 2022.

== Early life and career ==
Mayen was born in South Sudan and grew up in Adelaide, South Australia, where he attended Concordia College and graduated in 2016. He represented South Australia at the 2016 Australian Under 20 nationals and played club basketball with the Sturt Sabres.

In 2016, Mayen debuted for the BA Centre of Excellence in the South East Australian Basketball League (SEABL). In nine games, he averaged 12.0 points and 5.3 rebounds per game. He returned to the Centre of Excellence in 2017 and averaged 14.1 points, 5.6 rebounds and 2.3 assists in eight SEABL games.

== College career ==
Mayen moved to the United States to play college basketball for the TCU Horned Frogs.

After redshirting the 2017–18 season, Mayen joined TCU for the 2018–19 season. He played in 17 games before suffering a season-ending knee injury. He averaged 2.1 points and 1.2 rebounds in 7.9 minutes played per game.

For the 2019–20 season, Mayen joined Chipola College of the National Junior College Athletic Association (NJCAA). He helped the school to an 18–10 record and averaged 11.8 points, 8.4 rebounds and 2.7 assists per game. He was subsequently named first-team All-Panhandle Conference.

For the 2020–21 season, Mayen joined the Nebraska Cornhuskers. He was forced to play out of position at centre early in the season as Nebraska was without Derrick Walker and Eduardo Andre for the first six games of the year. He was one of two Huskers to start all 27 games and finished with averages of 8.6 points and 4.5 rebounds per game. He averaged 13.3 points and 6.3 rebounds per game in his final four games, which included a game with a career-high 25 points against Rutgers. He led Nebraska with 48 made 3-pointers.

In the 2021–22 season, Mayen battled a back injury early in the season but managed to start 31 games and averaged 5.9 points and 3.8 rebounds per game. He had two double-digit scoring games in 2021–22, including a season-high 13 points against Penn State. Mayen had been touted as a sharp shooter upon joining the Huskers, but finished his career shooting 33% from 3-point range with 77 total 3-pointers.

Despite having a year of eligibility remaining, Mayen decided to not return to Nebraska for the 2022–23 season to begin his professional career.

== Professional career ==
In May 2022, Mayen joined the Cairns Marlins of the NBL1 North. In 15 games during the 2022 season, he averaged 20.1 points, 7.1 rebounds and 2.1 assists per game.

On 29 June 2022, Mayen signed a two-year deal with the Cairns Taipans of the National Basketball League (NBL). In 16 games during the 2022–23 season, he averaged 2.9 points and 2.3 rebounds per game.

In March 2023, Mayen joined the Bendigo Braves of the NBL1 South. In 20 games during the 2023 season, he averaged 19.9 points, 8.1 rebounds 2.25 assists per game.

Mayen returned to the Taipans for the 2023–24 NBL season. In 27 games, he averaged 6.9 points and 3.5 rebounds per game.

Mayen joined the Wellington Saints for the 2024 New Zealand NBL season. He left the team mid season after making the final Olympic trial group for South Sudan. In 10 games, he averaged 15.7 points, 5.0 rebounds, 2.8 assists and 1.0 steals per game.

On 16 April 2024, Mayen signed with the Adelaide 36ers for the 2024–25 NBL season. During his 36ers debut on 22 September, he recorded an NBL career-high 23 points in a loss to the Sydney Kings.

Mayen joined the West Adelaide Bearcats of the NBL1 Central for the 2025 season. He helped the Bearcats reach the NBL1 Central Grand Final, where they defeated the Central Districts Lions 83–73 to win the championship behind Mayen's game-high 26 points and 10 rebounds.

On 23 April 2025, Mayen signed a two-year deal with the Perth Wildcats. Following the 2025–26 NBL season, Mayen and the Wildcats declined a mutual option for the 2026–27 season. He joined the East Perth Eagles of the NBL1 West for the 2026 season.

On 21 May 2026, Mayen signed a two-year deal with the Brisbane Bullets.

== National team ==
In 2016, Mayen played for Australia at the FIBA Oceania U18 Championship. He also played for Australia at the 2016 Albert Schweitzer Tournament in Germany.

Mayen was selected by the South Sudan men's national basketball team in an extended squad in the lead up to the 2024 Summer Olympics.

== Personal life ==
Mayen is a cousin of fellow basketball players, Yuat Alok and Kouat Noi.
