= 2025–26 NBL season =

48th season of the Australasian basketball competition

- League: National Basketball League
- Sport: Basketball
- Duration: 18 September 2025 – 18 February 2026; 8 October 2025 – 22 February 2026 (NBL Ignite Cup); 4–7 March 2026 (Play-in tournament); 10–18 March 2026 (Semifinals); 21 March – 5 April 2026 (Finals)
- Games: 165
- Teams: 10
- Total attendance: 1,093,048
- Average attendance: 6,665
- TV partner(s): ESPN/Foxtel, Network 10/10 Drama, Sky Sport
- Streaming partner(s): Disney+, Kayo Sports, 10, NBL TV, Sky Sport Now

Regular season
- Season champions: Sydney Kings
- Season MVP: (Australia) Bryce Cotton (Adelaide)
- Top scorer: (Australia) Bryce Cotton (Adelaide)

NBL Ignite Cup
- Champions: New Zealand Breakers (1st title)
- Runners-up: Adelaide 36ers

Finals
- Champions: Sydney Kings (6th title)
- Runners-up: Adelaide 36ers
- Finals MVP: (United States) Kendric Davis (Sydney)

NBL seasons
- ← 2024–25 2026–27 →

The 2025–26 NBL season was the 48th season of the National Basketball League since its establishment in 1979. A total of ten teams will contest the 2025–26 season.

As Australia and New Zealand will participate in 2027 FIBA Basketball World Cup qualification, the league will take a break during the FIBA international windows of 24 November to 2 December 2025 and 23 February to 3 March 2026.

== Teams ==
All ten teams from the 2024–25 NBL season will continue on in 2025–26.

=== Stadiums and locations ===
Team	Location	Stadium	Capacity
Adelaide 36ers	Adelaide	Adelaide Entertainment Centre	11,300
Brisbane Bullets	Brisbane	Brisbane Entertainment Centre	10,500
Cairns Taipans	Cairns	Cairns Convention Centre	5,300
Illawarra Hawks	Wollongong	Wollongong Entertainment Centre	6,000
Melbourne United	Melbourne	John Cain Arena	10,175
New Zealand Breakers	Auckland	Spark Arena	9,740
Perth Wildcats	Perth	Perth Arena	14,800
S.E. Melbourne Phoenix	Melbourne	John Cain Arena	10,175
S.E. Melbourne Phoenix	Melbourne	State Basketball Centre	3,422
Sydney Kings	Sydney	Sydney SuperDome	18,200
Tasmania JackJumpers	Hobart	Derwent Entertainment Centre	4,340
Tasmania JackJumpers	Launceston	Silverdome	3,255

=== Personnel and sponsorship ===
Team	Coach	Captain	Main sponsor	Kit manufacturer
Adelaide 36ers	(United States) Mike Wells	(Australia) Bryce Cotton (Australia) Isaac Humphries (Australia) Dejan Vasiljevic	Mega Rewards	Champion
Brisbane Bullets	(Australia) Darryl McDonald (interim)	(Australia) Mitch Norton	N/A	Champion
Cairns Taipans	(Australia) Adam Forde	(New Zealand) Sam Waardenburg	Kenfrost Homes	Champion
Illawarra Hawks	(United States) Justin Tatum	(Australia) Sam Froling (United States) Tyler Harvey	Multi Civil and Rail	Champion
Melbourne United	(Australia) Dean Vickerman	(Australia) Chris Goulding	Engie	Champion
New Zealand Breakers	(Finland) Petteri Koponen	(United States) Parker Jackson-Cartwright	Bank of New Zealand	Champion
Perth Wildcats	(Australia) John Rillie	(Australia) Jesse Wagstaff	Mate Internet Mobile	Champion
S.E. Melbourne Phoenix	(United States) Josh King	(Australia) Jordan Hunter (Australia) Nathan Sobey	Mountain Goat Beer	Champion
Sydney Kings	(Australia) Brian Goorjian	(Australia) Matthew Dellavedova	Harvey Norman	Champion
Tasmania JackJumpers	(United States) Scott Roth	(Australia) Will Magnay	Spirit of Tasmania	Champion

=== Player transactions ===
Free agency began on 4 April 2025.

=== Coaching transactions ===
Head coaching transactions
Team	2024–25 season	2025–26 season
Off-season
Brisbane Bullets	Justin Schueller	Stu Lash
Cairns Taipans	Adam Forde	
New Zealand Breakers	Petteri Koponen	
In-season
Brisbane Bullets	Stu Lash	Darryl McDonald (interim)

== Pre-season ==
The pre-season games began on 28 June to 5 October 2025.

The pre-season also features Melbourne United, S.E. Melbourne Phoenix to host games between NBA’s New Orleans Pelicans at Rod Laver Arena, Melbourne, this will be the seventh NBLxNBA tour.

=== NBL Blitz ===
The 2025 NBL Blitz will run from 27 to 31 August 2025 with games being played at the AIS Arena, Canberra.

Pos	Team	Pld	W	L	PF	PA	PP	BP	Pts
1	New Zealand Breakers (C)	2	2	0	203	176	115.3	7	13
2	Tasmania JackJumpers	2	2	0	194	190	102.1	3	9
3	Adelaide 36ers	2	1	1	199	180	110.6	5.5	8.5
4	Melbourne United	2	1	1	176	144	122.2	5	8
5	S.E. Melbourne Phoenix	2	1	1	203	190	106.8	4	7
6	Perth Wildcats	2	1	1	176	178	98.9	4	7
7	Brisbane Bullets	2	1	1	160	190	84.2	4	7
8	Illawarra Hawks	2	1	1	183	196	93.4	2.5	5.5
9	Cairns Taipans	2	0	2	170	191	89.0	3	3
10	Sydney Kings	2	0	2	173	202	85.6	2	2

Updated to match(es) played on 31 August 2025. Source: nblblitz.com.au
(C) Champions

== Regular season ==
The regular season will begin on 18 September 2025. It will consist of 165 games (33 games each) spread across 22 rounds, with the final game being played on 20 February 2026.

=== Round 1 ===
18 September 2025	Tasmania JackJumpers	84–88	Melbourne United	Derwent Entertainment Centre, Hobart
19:30	Scoring by quarter: 22–23, 24–24, 18–17, 20–24
ESPN	Pts: Hamilton 24; Rebs: Johnson 10; Asts: Ayre, Campbell 4	boxscore report	Pts: Doyle 22; Rebs: Krslovic 12; Asts: three players 3	Attendance: 4,340

19 September 2025	New Zealand Breakers	95–104	Brisbane Bullets	Spark Arena, Auckland
19:30	Scoring by quarter: 20–21, 24–25, 22–28, 29–30
Sky Sport	Pts: Brockington, Jackson-Cartwright 16; Rebs: Mennenga 8 Asts: Jackson-Cartwright 12	boxscore report	Pts: Prather 27; Rebs: Harrison 15; Asts: Adams 7	Attendance: 4,443

20 September 2025	S.E. Melbourne Phoenix	114–77	Cairns Taipans	John Cain Arena, Melbourne
17:30	Scoring by quarter: 23–15, 36–20, 29–26, 26–16
ESPN	Pts: Glover 18; Rebs: Hunter, Lewis 8 Asts: Sobey 8	boxscore report	Pts: Smith 19; Rebs: Lee 12; Asts: Stattmann 5	Attendance: 5,371

20 September 2025	Perth Wildcats	72–75	Tasmania JackJumpers	Perth Arena, Perth
18:00	Scoring by quarter: 21–13, 14–20, 14–21, 23–21
ESPN	Pts: Jones 16; Rebs: Lual-Acuil 14; Asts: Jones, Windler 3	boxscore report	Pts: Hamilton 26; Rebs: Bannan 10; Asts: Hamilton 5	Attendance: 11,701

21 September 2025	Melbourne United	114–82	New Zealand Breakers	John Cain Arena, Melbourne
14:30	Scoring by quarter: 34–15, 21–18, 34–22, 25–27
Network 10	Pts: Edwards 22; Rebs: Krslovic 8 Asts: Ili 8	boxscore report	Pts: Brockington 21; Rebs: Brockington, López 6 Asts: Davison, Jackson-Cartwright 4	Attendance: 9,101

=== Round 2 ===
25 September 2025	Melbourne United	103–83	S.E. Melbourne Phoenix	John Cain Arena, Melbourne
19:30	Scoring by quarter: 29–24, 23–22, 23–24, 28–13
ESPN	Pts: Doyle 18; Rebs: Edwards 6 Asts: Walker 8	boxscore report	Pts: Sobey 26; Rebs: Gak, Glover 6 Asts: Maldonado 7	Attendance: 10,035

26 September 2025	Cairns Taipans	83–82	Brisbane Bullets	Cairns Convention Centre, Cairns
19:30	Scoring by quarter: 21–17, 24–24, 16–15, 22–26
ESPN	Pts: McVeigh, Schofield 19; Rebs: McVeigh 9 Asts: McVeigh 9	boxscore report	Pts: Harrison 22; Rebs: Freeman-Liberty, Harrison 7 Asts: Adams 6	Attendance: 4,052

27 September 2025	New Zealand Breakers	78–89	Perth Wildcats	Spark Arena, Auckland
19:30	Scoring by quarter: 17–25, 25–19, 17–18, 19–27
Sky Sport	Pts: Jackson-Cartwright 18; Rebs: López, Mennenga 7 Asts: Jackson-Cartwright 5	boxscore report	Pts: Lual-Acuil 21; Rebs: Windler 15; Asts: Doolittle, Henshall 3	Attendance: 4,047

27 September 2025	Illawarra Hawks	86–91	Tasmania JackJumpers	Wollongong Entertainment Centre, Wollongong
20:00	Scoring by quarter: 21–21, 24–28, 16–20, 25–22
ESPN	Pts: McGee 32; Rebs: McGee 13; Asts: McLaughlin 6	boxscore report	Pts: Hamilton 21; Rebs: Magnay 8 Asts: Campbell 4	Attendance: 5,123

28 September 2025	Sydney Kings	74–77	Cairns Taipans	Sydney SuperDome, Sydney
14:30	Scoring by quarter: 18–22, 27–18, 13–21, 16–16
Network 10	Pts: Davis 21; Rebs: Noi 9 Asts: Dellavedova 5	boxscore report	Pts: McVeigh 24; Rebs: McVeigh 9 Asts: Andrews 7	Attendance: 8,536

28 September 2025	Adelaide 36ers	87–80	Brisbane Bullets	Adelaide Entertainment Centre, Adelaide
16:00	Scoring by quarter: 27–23, 21–24, 29–20, 10–13
10 Drama	Pts: Cotton 39; Rebs: Cheatham 14; Asts: Cotton 6	boxscore report	Pts: Prather 20; Rebs: Harrison 12; Asts: Prather 6	Attendance: 9,429

=== Round 3 ===
2 October 2025	Cairns Taipans	79–110	Adelaide 36ers	Cairns Convention Centre, Cairns
19:30	Scoring by quarter: 23–36, 15–22, 22–27, 19–25
ESPN	Pts: Schofield 19; Rebs: Lee 7 Asts: Andrews 7	boxscore report	Pts: Cotton 28; Rebs: Cheatham 10; Asts: Cotton 7	Attendance: 4,213

2 October 2025	Perth Wildcats	92–84	Illawarra Hawks	Perth Arena, Perth
19:30	Scoring by quarter: 10–20, 34–23, 23–13, 25–28
ESPN	Pts: Lual-Acuil 22; Rebs: Windler 14; Asts: Doolittle, Jones 4	boxscore report	Pts: McGee 26; Rebs: McGee 14; Asts: Harvey 5	Attendance: 11,572

4 October 2025	Sydney Kings	97–75	New Zealand Breakers	Sydney SuperDome, Sydney
17:30	Scoring by quarter: 22–15, 17–19, 31–18, 27–23
ESPN	Pts: Davis 28; Rebs: Soares 8 Asts: Dellavedova 7	boxscore report	Pts: Jackson-Cartwright 16; Rebs: Mennenga 12; Asts: Jackson-Cartwright 5	Attendance: 10,798

4 October 2025	Brisbane Bullets	82–84	Tasmania JackJumpers	Brisbane Entertainment Centre, Brisbane
20:00	Scoring by quarter: 21–22, 24–20, 21–16, 16–26
ESPN	Pts: Adams 19; Rebs: Smith-Milner 10; Asts: Adams 7	boxscore report	Pts: Bannan 23; Rebs: Bannan 15; Asts: Ayre, Campbell 3	Attendance: 6,946

=== Round 4 ===
8 October 2025	New Zealand Breakers	117–88	Illawarra Hawks	Spark Arena, Auckland
19:30	Scoring by quarter: 30–24, 30–25, 27–23, 30–16
Sky Sport	Pts: Jackson-Cartwright, Mennenga 20; Rebs: López 9 Asts: Jackson-Cartwright 17	boxscore report	Pts: Harvey 22; Rebs: Blanchfield 8 Asts: Harvey 6	Attendance: 3,101

8 October 2025	Sydney Kings	93–107	Melbourne United	Sydney SuperDome, Sydney
19:30	Scoring by quarter: 25–29, 27–21, 19–31, 22–26
ESPN	Pts: Cooks, Davis 21; Rebs: Cooks 10; Asts: Dellavedova 7	boxscore report	Pts: Walker 27; Rebs: Edwards 12; Asts: Doyle 6	Attendance: 9,528

9 October 2025	Adelaide 36ers	98–89	Tasmania JackJumpers	Adelaide Entertainment Centre, Adelaide
19:00	Scoring by quarter: 21–20, 30–22, 25–30, 22–17
ESPN	Pts: Cotton 29; Rebs: Cheatham 9 Asts: Cotton 9	boxscore report	Pts: Hamilton 22; Rebs: Magnay, Marshall 6 Asts: Hamilton 9	Attendance: 9,320

10 October 2025	Cairns Taipans	77–80	Perth Wildcats	Cairns Convention Centre, Cairns
18:30	Scoring by quarter: 23–23, 20–18, 17–20, 17–19
ESPN	Pts: Andrews 21; Rebs: Lee 12; Asts: McVeigh 6	boxscore report	Pts: Lual-Acuil 30; Rebs: Windler 11; Asts: Russo-Nance, Windler 3	Attendance: 3,985

11 October 2025	Illawarra Hawks	116–89	Brisbane Bullets	Wollongong Entertainment Centre, Wollongong
17:30	Scoring by quarter: 34–18, 34–29, 21–24, 27–18
ESPN	Pts: Harvey 22; Rebs: McGee 12; Asts: Harvey 10	boxscore report	Pts: Prather 28; Rebs: Prather 9 Asts: Patterson 5	Attendance: 4,709

11 October 2025	Adelaide 36ers	79–103	Sydney Kings	Adelaide Entertainment Centre, Adelaide
19:30	Scoring by quarter: 19–29, 22–25, 23–25, 15–24
ESPN	Pts: Cameron 15; Rebs: Cameron, Cheatham 8 Asts: Cameron 7	boxscore report	Pts: Noi 29; Rebs: Soares 12; Asts: Dellavedova 7	Attendance: 10,021

12 October 2025	New Zealand Breakers	81–87	S.E. Melbourne Phoenix	Spark Arena, Auckland
16:30	Scoring by quarter: 15–21, 31–13, 19–28, 16–25
Network 10	Pts: Mennenga 29; Rebs: Mennenga 11; Asts: Jackson-Cartwright 9	boxscore report	Pts: Foxwell 19; Rebs: Hunter 7 Asts: Foxwell, Sobey 7	Attendance: 4,520

12 October 2025	Melbourne United	95–60	Cairns Taipans	John Cain Arena, Melbourne
16:30	Scoring by quarter: 27–15, 21–10, 22–16, 25–19
10 Drama	Pts: Edwards, Goulding 16; Rebs: Edwards 12; Asts: Delany 4	boxscore report	Pts: Higgins-Titsha 16; Rebs: Lee 7 Asts: Andrews 6	Attendance: 9,233

=== Round 5 ===
15 October 2025	Tasmania JackJumpers	86–70	Sydney Kings	Derwent Entertainment Centre, Hobart
19:30	Scoring by quarter: 29–19, 21–13, 19–18, 17–20
ESPN	Pts: Campbell 21; Rebs: Bannan 14; Asts: Bannan, Marshall 6	boxscore report	Pts: Galloway 13; Rebs: Cooks, Soares 8 Asts: three players 4	Attendance: 4,139

15 October 2025	Perth Wildcats	93–110	Brisbane Bullets	Perth Arena, Perth
18:30	Scoring by quarter: 21–26, 27–30, 23–24, 22–30
ESPN	Pts: Jones 19; Rebs: Doolittle 5 Asts: Doolittle 6	boxscore report	Pts: Prather 34; Rebs: Harrison 15; Asts: Adams, Patterson 6	Attendance: 6,110

16 October 2025	Adelaide 36ers	88–71	S.E. Melbourne Phoenix	Adelaide Entertainment Centre, Adelaide
19:00	Scoring by quarter: 28–16, 22–11, 16–18, 22–26
ESPN	Pts: Cotton 28; Rebs: Cheatham 14; Asts: Cotton 6	boxscore report	Pts: Hunter 16; Rebs: Hunter, Sobey 7 Asts: Maldonado 7	Attendance: 9,802

17 October 2025	New Zealand Breakers	82–65	Tasmania JackJumpers	Spark Arena, Auckland
19:30	Scoring by quarter: 20–18, 20–13, 23–11, 19–23
Sky Sport	Pts: Jackson-Cartwright 21; Rebs: Mennenga 8 Asts: Jackson-Cartwright 6	boxscore report	Pts: Magnay 14; Rebs: Magnay 12; Asts: Campbell 4	Attendance: 3,212

17 October 2025	Brisbane Bullets	86–95	Melbourne United	Brisbane Entertainment Centre, Brisbane
18:30	Scoring by quarter: 16–31, 21–24, 17–15, 32–25
ESPN	Pts: Adams 29; Rebs: Harrison 11; Asts: Adams 5	boxscore report	Pts: Goulding 22; Rebs: Edwards 7 Asts: Walker 6	Attendance: 4,899

18 October 2025	Cairns Taipans	86–91	Adelaide 36ers	Cairns Convention Centre, Cairns
16:30	Scoring by quarter: 17–19, 19–25, 21–20, 29–27
ESPN	Pts: Andrews 23; Rebs: Galloway, Schofield 9 Asts: Andrews 7	boxscore report	Pts: Cotton 53; Rebs: Cameron, Cheatham 8 Asts: Cotton 5	Attendance: 4,004

18 October 2025	S.E. Melbourne Phoenix	116–76	Illawarra Hawks	John Cain Arena, Melbourne
20:00	Scoring by quarter: 30–23, 36–17, 17–12, 33–24
ESPN	Pts: Glover 26; Rebs: Hunter 9 Asts: Maldonado 9	boxscore report	Pts: McGee 22; Rebs: McGee 11; Asts: Harvey 3	Attendance: 5,615

19 October 2025	Melbourne United	104–88	New Zealand Breakers	John Cain Arena, Melbourne
14:30	Scoring by quarter: 28–17, 28–21, 19–25, 29–25
10 Drama	Pts: Goulding 23; Rebs: Edwards 10; Asts: Walker 9	boxscore report	Pts: Brockington 25; Rebs: Jackson-Cartwright, López 9 Asts: Jackson-Cartwright 9	Attendance: 8,092

19 October 2025	Sydney Kings	94–72	Perth Wildcats	Sydney SuperDome, Sydney
16:30	Scoring by quarter: 15–22, 35–23, 24–21, 20–6
10 Drama	Pts: Davis 25; Rebs: Cooks, Soares 8 Asts: Cooks, Dellavedova 4	boxscore report	Pts: Lual-Acuil 17; Rebs: Doolittle 10; Asts: Lual-Acuil, Rillie 3	Attendance: 8,032

=== Round 6 ===
22 October 2025	Cairns Taipans	78–110	Perth Wildcats	Cairns Convention Centre, Cairns
18:30	Scoring by quarter: 22–30, 20–30, 20–28, 16–22
ESPN	Pts: Schofield 16; Rebs: Galloway 8 Asts: Smith 5	boxscore report	Pts: Lual-Acuil 24; Rebs: Doolittle 8 Asts: three players 4	Attendance: 3,317

23 October 2025	New Zealand Breakers	83–84	Brisbane Bullets	Eventfinda Stadium, Auckland
19:30	Scoring by quarter: 25–11, 32–28, 15–29, 11–16
Sky Sport	Pts: Mennenga 27; Rebs: four player 6 Asts: Jackson-Cartwright 5	boxscore report	Pts: Prather 23; Rebs: Prather 12; Asts: Adams 5	Attendance: 2,841

23 October 2025	S.E. Melbourne Phoenix	112–95	Sydney Kings	John Cain Arena, Melbourne
19:30	Scoring by quarter: 22–20, 23–28, 34–25, 33–22
ESPN	Pts: Sobey 33; Rebs: Foxwell 6 Asts: Foxwell 8	boxscore report	Pts: Davis 31; Rebs: four player 5 Asts: Davis 6	Attendance: 3,786

24 October 2025	Cairns Taipans	67–94	Melbourne United	Cairns Convention Centre, Cairns
18:30	Scoring by quarter: 16–31, 18–17, 17–24, 16–22
ESPN	Pts: Andrews, Smith 13; Rebs: Lee, Mag 10; Asts: Andrews 5	boxscore report	Pts: Goulding 14; Rebs: Delany, Doyle 6 Asts: Doyle, Walker 4	Attendance: 3,505

25 October 2025	Brisbane Bullets	86–109	S.E. Melbourne Phoenix	Brisbane Entertainment Centre, Brisbane
16:30	Scoring by quarter: 20–23, 19–23, 22–37, 25–26
ESPN	Pts: Prather 18; Rebs: Harrison 10; Asts: Adams 7	boxscore report	Pts: Sobey 29; Rebs: Lewis 8 Asts: Maldonado 7	Attendance: 5,244

25 October 2025	Perth Wildcats	84–85	Illawarra Hawks	Perth Arena, Perth
17:00	Scoring by quarter: 19–23, 15–18, 24–11, 26–33
ESPN	Pts: Lual-Acuil 18; Rebs: Lual-Acuil 12; Asts: Doolittle 5	boxscore report	Pts: Harvey, McGee 24; Rebs: McGee 11; Asts: Harvey 8	Attendance: 12,497

26 October 2025	Melbourne United	81–80	Adelaide 36ers	John Cain Arena, Melbourne
14:30	Scoring by quarter: 14–17, 26–20, 19–18, 22–25
Network 10	Pts: Edwards 25; Rebs: Krslovic 8 Asts: Doyle 5	boxscore report	Pts: Cotton 22; Rebs: Cheatham 12; Asts: Cheatham 9	Attendance: 10,175

26 October 2025	Sydney Kings	89–90	Tasmania JackJumpers	Sydney SuperDome, Sydney
16:30	Scoring by quarter: 25–29, 30–21, 24–14, 10–26
10 Drama	Pts: Davis 22; Rebs: Cooks 8 Asts: Dellavedova 6	boxscore report	Pts: Bannan, Hamilton 18; Rebs: Bannan 9 Asts: Campbell 8	Attendance: 11,023

=== Round 7 ===
29 October 2025	Tasmania JackJumpers	84–95	Perth Wildcats	Derwent Entertainment Centre, Hobart
19:30	Scoring by quarter: 28–16, 13–21, 27–35, 16–23
ESPN	Pts: Hamilton 26; Rebs: Bannan 8 Asts: Campbell 7	boxscore report	Pts: Lual-Acuil 23; Rebs: Russo-Nance 7 Asts: Doolittle 4	Attendance: 4,139

30 October 2025	Brisbane Bullets	113–85	Cairns Taipans	Brisbane Entertainment Centre, Brisbane
18:30	Scoring by quarter: 25–27, 32–20, 22–20, 34–18
ESPN	Pts: Harrison, Prather 21; Rebs: Prather 10; Asts: Adams 7	boxscore report	Pts: McVeigh 23; Rebs: Lee 8 Asts: Andrews 10	Attendance: 3,684

31 October 2025	Illawarra Hawks	60–102	New Zealand Breakers	Wollongong Entertainment Centre, Wollongong
19:30	Scoring by quarter: 18–31, 16–21, 10–27, 16–23
ESPN	Pts: McGee 13; Rebs: McGee 10; Asts: Hickey 6	boxscore report	Pts: Mennenga 21; Rebs: Mennenga 11; Asts: Jackson-Cartwright 6	Attendance: 4,080

1 November 2025	Tasmania JackJumpers	69–75	Cairns Taipans	Silverdome, Launceston
17:30	Scoring by quarter: 15–18, 16–22, 18–14, 20–21
ESPN	Pts: Hamilton 21; Rebs: Bannan 12; Asts: Hamilton 6	boxscore report	Pts: Andrews 27; Rebs: four players 6 Asts: Andrews 3	Attendance: 3,255

1 November 2025	Brisbane Bullets	79–116	Sydney Kings	Brisbane Entertainment Centre, Brisbane
19:00	Scoring by quarter: 17–35, 28–22, 21–32, 13–27
ESPN	Pts: Prather 24; Rebs: Harrison 7 Asts: Dalton 4	boxscore report	Pts: Cooks 24; Rebs: Cooks 10; Asts: Davis, Dellavedova 7	Attendance: 5,039

2 November 2025	S.E. Melbourne Phoenix	94–89	Perth Wildcats	John Cain Arena, Melbourne
14:30	Scoring by quarter: 21–24, 25–22, 29–26, 19–17
Network 10	Pts: Sobey 22; Rebs: Lewis 11; Asts: Lewis 6	boxscore report	Pts: Doolittle 19; Rebs: Doolittle 13; Asts: Rillie 7	Attendance: 9,386

2 November 2025	Adelaide 36ers	90–88	Illawarra Hawks	Adelaide Entertainment Centre, Adelaide
16:00	Scoring by quarter: 21–19, 20–22, 31–26, 18–21
10 Drama	Pts: Cotton 24; Rebs: Cheatham 13; Asts: Cotton 9	boxscore report	Pts: Hickey 20; Rebs: McGee 11; Asts: Hickey 8	Attendance: 9,983

3 November 2025	Melbourne United	92–95	Sydney Kings	John Cain Arena, Melbourne
19:30	Scoring by quarter: 25–30, 25–24, 19–23, 23–18
ESPN	Pts: Walker 22; Rebs: Walker 9 Asts: Walker 5	boxscore report	Pts: Davis 34; Rebs: Soares 8 Asts: Dellavedova 7	Attendance: 10,175

=== Round 8 ===
5 November 2025	Illawarra Hawks	107–93	Melbourne United	Wollongong Entertainment Centre, Wollongong
19:30	Scoring by quarter: 32–22, 25–21, 22–25, 28–25
ESPN	Pts: McGee 37; Rebs: McGee 14; Asts: Hickey, Peterson 7	boxscore report	Pts: Delany 21; Rebs: Edwards, Krslovic 6 Asts: Doyle 11	Attendance: 3,012

6 November 2025	New Zealand Breakers	79–83	Adelaide 36ers	Wolfbrook Arena, Christchurch
19:30	Scoring by quarter: 14–22, 33–21, 21–23, 11–17
Sky Sport	Pts: Brockington 25; Rebs: Baker 9 Asts: Jackson-Cartwright 10	boxscore report	Pts: Cotton 23; Rebs: Cameron, Cheatham 8 Asts: Cotton 6	Attendance: 3,859

6 November 2025	Tasmania JackJumpers	102–103	S.E. Melbourne Phoenix	Silverdome, Launceston
19:30	Scoring by quarter: 29–32, 32–28, 20–18, 21–25
ESPN	Pts: Hamilton 36; Rebs: Bannan 10; Asts: Hamilton 5	boxscore report	Pts: Sobey 28; Rebs: Brown 14; Asts: three players 4	Attendance: 3,255

7 November 2025	Cairns Taipans	90–107	Illawarra Hawks	Cairns Convention Centre, Cairns
18:30	Scoring by quarter: 22–25, 26–27, 20–29, 22–26
ESPN	Pts: King 32; Rebs: McVeigh 8 Asts: Andrews, McVeigh 8	boxscore report	Pts: McGee 28; Rebs: Hickey 12; Asts: Hickey 12	Attendance: 4,025

8 November 2025	Tasmania JackJumpers	81–83	Brisbane Bullets	Derwent Entertainment Centre, Hobart
17:30	Scoring by quarter: 23–19, 20–27, 17–23, 21–14
ESPN	Pts: Bannan, Marshall 18; Rebs: Bannan 11; Asts: Campbell 8	boxscore report	Pts: Prather 28; Rebs: Harrison 9 Asts: Adams 7	Attendance: 4,340

8 November 2025	S.E. Melbourne Phoenix	81–92	Melbourne United	John Cain Arena, Melbourne
20:00	Scoring by quarter: 28–27, 17–20, 12–21, 24–24
ESPN	Pts: Sobey 15; Rebs: Brown 8 Asts: Foster, Foxwell 7	boxscore report	Pts: Walker 24; Rebs: Edwards 11; Asts: Walker 6	Attendance: 8,806

9 November 2025	Adelaide 36ers	87–94	Perth Wildcats	Adelaide Entertainment Centre, Adelaide
14:00	Scoring by quarter: 18–17, 27–27, 31–28, 11–22
Network 10	Pts: Cotton 23; Rebs: Cheatham 9 Asts: Cotton 7	boxscore report	Pts: Windler 18; Rebs: Windler 12; Asts: Windler 5	Attendance: 10,029

9 November 2025	Sydney Kings	79–72	New Zealand Breakers	Sydney SuperDome, Sydney
16:30	Scoring by quarter: 17–25, 22–16, 13–13, 27–18
10 Drama	Pts: Cooks, Davis 21; Rebs: Cooks 14; Asts: Davis 6	boxscore report	Pts: Jackson-Cartwright 23; Rebs: Brockington, López 8 Asts: Jackson-Cartwright 7	Attendance: 10,067

=== Round 9 ===
12 November 2025	Brisbane Bullets	84–113	New Zealand Breakers	Gold Coast Sports Centre, Gold Coast
18:30	Scoring by quarter: 18–27, 18–41, 21–24, 27–21
ESPN	Pts: Prather 26; Rebs: Harrison, Prather 8 Asts: Ducas 5	boxscore report	Pts: Mennenga 25; Rebs: Baker 11; Asts: Jackson-Cartwright 7	Attendance: 2,275

13 November 2025	Tasmania JackJumpers	86–97	Adelaide 36ers	Derwent Entertainment Centre, Hobart
19:30	Scoring by quarter: 15–26, 23–26, 17–28, 31–17
ESPN	Pts: Campbell 20; Rebs: Bannan 14; Asts: Ayre, Marshall 4	boxscore report	Pts: Cheatham 27; Rebs: Cheatham 14; Asts: Cheatham, Cotton 4	Attendance: 4,340

14 November 2025	Cairns Taipans	90–101	S.E. Melbourne Phoenix	Cairns Convention Centre, Cairns
18:30	Scoring by quarter: 24–28, 15–36, 23–20, 28–17
ESPN	Pts: McVeigh 22; Rebs: Schofield 8 Asts: Andrews 10	boxscore report	Pts: Glover 24; Rebs: Brown 6 Asts: Foxwell 7	Attendance: 3,567

15 November 2025	Melbourne United	99–93	Brisbane Bullets	John Cain Arena, Melbourne
17:30	Scoring by quarter: 24–24, 23–14, 25–16, 27–39
ESPN	Pts: Doyle 28; Rebs: Bowen 7 Asts: Doyle, Ili 4	boxscore report	Pts: Norton 19; Rebs: Harrison 11; Asts: four players 3	Attendance: 8,930

15 November 2025	Perth Wildcats	88–75	New Zealand Breakers	Perth Arena, Perth
17:00	Scoring by quarter: 22–14, 21–24, 21–22, 24–15
ESPN	Pts: Doolittle 24; Rebs: Doolittle 14; Asts: three players 2	boxscore report	Pts: Jackson-Cartwright 22; Rebs: López 10; Asts: Jackson-Cartwright 9	Attendance: 12,350

16 November 2025	Illawarra Hawks	71–98	Sydney Kings	Wollongong Entertainment Centre, Wollongong
14:30	Scoring by quarter: 14–18, 18–35, 18–18, 21–27
Network 10	Pts: Hickey 19; Rebs: three players 9 Asts: Hickey 8	boxscore report	Pts: Davis 17; Rebs: Soares 11; Asts: Davis 8	Attendance: 5,378

16 November 2025	Adelaide 36ers	105–101(OT)	Cairns Taipans	Adelaide Entertainment Centre, Adelaide
16:00	Scoring by quarter: 26–27, 25–23, 27–18, 13–23, Overtime: 14–10
10 Drama	Pts: Cotton 41; Rebs: Humphries 13; Asts: Cotton 8	boxscore report	Pts: McVeigh 39; Rebs: Lee 9 Asts: Andrews 8	Attendance: 9,878

=== Round 10 ===
19 November 2025	Adelaide 36ers	97–85	Illawarra Hawks	Adelaide Entertainment Centre, Adelaide
19:00	Scoring by quarter: 21–22, 23–27, 27–15, 26–21
ESPN	Pts: Cotton 31; Rebs: Humphries 9 Asts: Cotton 13	boxscore report	Pts: Harvey 21; Rebs: McGee 10; Asts: Hickey 7	Attendance: 9,964

20 November 2025	Brisbane Bullets	76–103	S.E. Melbourne Phoenix	Brisbane Entertainment Centre, Brisbane
18:30	Scoring by quarter: 19–27, 21–29, 21–18, 15–29
ESPN	Pts: Harrison 16; Rebs: Holt 9 Asts: Harrison, Norton 4	boxscore report	Pts: Hunter 24; Rebs: Hunter 9 Asts: Sobey 6	Attendance: 3,429

21 November 2025	Illawarra Hawks	102–105	Melbourne United	Wollongong Entertainment Centre, Wollongong
19:30	Scoring by quarter: 33–38, 19–20, 31–28, 19–19
ESPN	Pts: McGee 28; Rebs: McGee 12; Asts: Hickey 7	boxscore report	Pts: Goulding 23; Rebs: Edwards 8 Asts: Doyle 7	Attendance: 3,872

21 November 2025	Perth Wildcats	101–95	Tasmania JackJumpers	Perth Arena, Perth
18:30	Scoring by quarter: 32–28, 25–24, 24–19, 20–24
ESPN	Pts: Doolittle 30; Rebs: Lual-Acuil 8 Asts: Doolittle 6	boxscore report	Pts: Bannan 29; Rebs: Deng 11; Asts: Hamilton 5	Attendance: 10,930

22 November 2025	Cairns Taipans	96–102	New Zealand Breakers	Cairns Convention Centre, Cairns
16:30	Scoring by quarter: 17–25, 27–22, 22–30, 30–25
ESPN	Pts: McVeigh 35; Rebs: McVeigh 7 Asts: Andrews 9	boxscore report	Pts: Brockington, Mennenga 22; Rebs: Brockington 11; Asts: Jackson-Cartwright 6	Attendance: 3,989

22 November 2025	S.E. Melbourne Phoenix	81–94	Adelaide 36ers	John Cain Arena, Melbourne
20:00	Scoring by quarter: 23–19, 20–18, 21–30, 17–27
ESPN	Pts: Sobey 26; Rebs: Hunter 12; Asts: Iwundu 6	boxscore report	Pts: Vasiljevic 22; Rebs: Cheatham 16; Asts: Cotton 9	Attendance: 5,906

23 November 2025	Tasmania JackJumpers	104–81	Sydney Kings	Derwent Entertainment Centre, Hobart
14:30	Scoring by quarter: 27–24, 33–16, 15–18, 29–23
Network 10	Pts: Hamilton 22; Rebs: Bannan, Marshall 8 Asts: Hamilton 6	boxscore report	Pts: Davis 20; Rebs: Maluach 5 Asts: Galloway 5	Attendance: 4,340

23 November 2025	Melbourne United	98–87	Perth Wildcats	John Cain Arena, Melbourne
16:30	Scoring by quarter: 24–22, 27–25, 23–26, 24–14
10 Drama	Pts: Doyle 24; Rebs: Edwards 16; Asts: Walker 7	boxscore report	Pts: Doolittle 20; Rebs: Doolittle 11; Asts: Doolittle 6	Attendance: 9,212

=== Round 11 ===
3 December 2025	New Zealand Breakers	95–90	Sydney Kings	Claudelands Arena, Hamilton
19:30	Scoring by quarter: 26–27, 23–20, 19–27, 27–16
Sky Sport	Pts: Jackson-Cartwright 24; Rebs: López, Mennenga 6 Asts: Brockington 5	boxscore report	Pts: Davis 18; Rebs: Cooks 7 Asts: Davis 11	Attendance: 2,770

4 December 2025	Illawarra Hawks	113–109(OT)	S.E. Melbourne Phoenix	Wollongong Entertainment Centre, Wollongong
19:30	Scoring by quarter: 31–13, 23–26, 20–22, 19–32, Overtime: 20–16
ESPN	Pts: Peterson 42; Rebs: McGee, Swaka Lo Buluk 13; Asts: Hickey 10	boxscore report	Pts: Iwundu 22; Rebs: Brown 10; Asts: Maldonado 7	Attendance: 3,432

4 December 2025	Perth Wildcats	96–84	Melbourne United	Perth Arena, Perth
18:30	Scoring by quarter: 33–20, 23–22, 20–15, 20–27
ESPN	Pts: Lual-Acuil 18; Rebs: Doolittle 9 Asts: Doolittle 7	boxscore report	Pts: Krebs 29; Rebs: Edwards 9 Asts: Walker 5	Attendance: 10,210

5 December 2025	Adelaide 36ers	90–65	Brisbane Bullets	Adelaide Entertainment Centre, Adelaide
19:00	Scoring by quarter: 23–20, 27–13, 27–12, 13–20
ESPN	Pts: Cheatham, Cotton 20; Rebs: Rakocevic 8 Asts: Cotton 6	boxscore report	Pts: Mathias 14; Rebs: Harrison 10; Asts: Devers 4	Attendance: 9,835

6 December 2025	New Zealand Breakers	99–86	Tasmania JackJumpers	Spark Arena, Auckland
19:30	Scoring by quarter: 28–14, 24–27, 28–29, 19–16
Sky Sport	Pts: Brockington 22; Rebs: Baker, Mennenga 9 Asts: Jackson-Cartwright 12	boxscore report	Pts: Hamilton 21; Rebs: Hamilton 8 Asts: Hamilton 6	Attendance: 3,638

6 December 2025	Illawarra Hawks	76–93	Cairns Taipans	Wollongong Entertainment Centre, Wollongong
20:00	Scoring by quarter: 20–20, 14–29, 24–24, 18–20
ESPN	Pts: Grida 18; Rebs: Hickey, McGee 11; Asts: Hickey 6	boxscore report	Pts: Andrews 27; Rebs: Galloway 14; Asts: Andrews 6	Attendance: 3,946

7 December 2025	S.E. Melbourne Phoenix	111–86	Melbourne United	John Cain Arena, Melbourne
14:30	Scoring by quarter: 32–22, 28–23, 23–21, 28–20
Network 10	Pts: Sobey 25; Rebs: Aliir 8 Asts: Brown 5	boxscore report	Pts: Doyle 22; Rebs: Delany 7 Asts: Doyle, Walker 5	Attendance: 10,175

7 December 2025	Perth Wildcats	94–95	Adelaide 36ers	Perth Arena, Perth
13:30	Scoring by quarter: 25–22, 25–18, 28–20, 16–35
10 Drama	Pts: Lual-Acuil 19; Rebs: Doolittle 11; Asts: Doolittle 6	boxscore report	Pts: Humphries 28; Rebs: Cameron 8 Asts: Cotton 12	Attendance: 13,661

=== Round 12 ===
10 December 2025	S.E. Melbourne Phoenix	81–89	Tasmania JackJumpers	Gippsland Indoor Stadium, Traralgon
19:30	Scoring by quarter: 36–27, 12–25, 18–18, 15–19
ESPN	Pts: Iwundu 17; Rebs: Hunter, Iwundu 8 Asts: Iwundu 4	boxscore report	Pts: Hamilton 18; Rebs: Bannan 12; Asts: Bannan 4	Attendance: 1,953

11 December 2025	Illawarra Hawks	100–85	Brisbane Bullets	Wollongong Entertainment Centre, Wollongong
19:30	Scoring by quarter: 23–33, 26–17, 22–18, 29–17
ESPN	Pts: McGee 30; Rebs: McGee 10; Asts: Peterson 8	boxscore report	Pts: Taylor 18; Rebs: Taylor 8 Asts: Norton 4	Attendance: 3,481

12 December 2025	Adelaide 36ers	114–105(OT)	Melbourne United	Adelaide Entertainment Centre, Adelaide
19:00	Scoring by quarter: 27–22, 32–26, 22–19, 14–28, Overtime: 19–10
ESPN	Pts: Cotton 33; Rebs: Cheatham 9 Asts: Cotton 13	boxscore report	Pts: Goulding 24; Rebs: Delany, Edwards 9 Asts: Doyle, Ili 3	Attendance: 10,032

12 December 2025	Perth Wildcats	79–108	Sydney Kings	Perth Arena, Perth
18:30	Scoring by quarter: 25–26, 17–18, 21–32, 16–32
ESPN	Pts: Windler 14; Rebs: Windler 8 Asts: Duke 7	boxscore report	Pts: Davis 38; Rebs: Cooks 6 Asts: Davis 8	Attendance: 10,958

13 December 2025	Cairns Taipans	68–81	Tasmania JackJumpers	Cairns Convention Centre, Cairns
16:30	Scoring by quarter: 21–13, 18–24, 15–23, 14–21
ESPN	Pts: McVeigh 24; Rebs: McVeigh 8 Asts: Andrews 8	boxscore report	Pts: Bannan 20; Rebs: Bannan, Magnay 13; Asts: Hamilton 7	Attendance: 3,876

13 December 2025	S.E. Melbourne Phoenix	92–80	New Zealand Breakers	Gippsland Indoor Stadium, Traralgon
20:00	Scoring by quarter: 26–20, 18–21, 27–21, 21–18
ESPN	Pts: Sobey 36; Rebs: Hunter 9 Asts: Brown, Sobey 5	boxscore	Pts: Baker, Jackson-Cartwright 16; Rebs: Jackson-Cartwright, Mennenga 9 Asts: Jackson-Cartwright 6	Attendance: 2,581

14 December 2025	Melbourne United	86–92(OT)	Sydney Kings	John Cain Arena, Melbourne
14:30	Scoring by quarter: 25–24, 25–21, 20–24, 14–15, Overtime: 2–8
Network 10	Pts: Doyle 21; Rebs: Krslovic 12; Asts: Walker 5	boxscore report	Pts: Davis 26; Rebs: Goodrick 10; Asts: Davis 6	Attendance: 9,402

14 December 2025	Brisbane Bullets	62–86	Perth Wildcats	Brisbane Entertainment Centre, Brisbane
15:30	Scoring by quarter: 13–22, 21–27, 15–16, 13–21
10 Drama	Pts: Taylor 18; Rebs: Harrison 12; Asts: Freeman-Liberty 3	boxscore report	Pts: Henshall 15; Rebs: Lual-Acuil 9 Asts: Duke 3	Attendance: 5,167

=== Round 13 ===
17 December 2025	Sydney Kings	97–93(OT)	Adelaide 36ers	AIS Arena, Canberra
19:30	Scoring by quarter: 23–29, 20–27, 23–9, 19–20, Overtime: 12–8
ESPN	Pts: Cooks, Davis 27; Rebs: Cooks 8 Asts: Davis, Dellavedova 7	boxscore report	Pts: Cotton 25; Rebs: Cheatham 13; Asts: Cotton 9	Attendance: 4,154

18 December 2025	Melbourne United	97–75	Illawarra Hawks	John Cain Arena, Melbourne
19:30	Scoring by quarter: 24–20, 23–21, 27–26, 23–8
ESPN	Pts: Walker 21; Rebs: Edwards 9 Asts: Walker 10	boxscore report	Pts: Harvey, McGee 18; Rebs: McGee 10; Asts: Hickey 6	Attendance: 7,205

18 December 2025	Perth Wildcats	76–77	S.E. Melbourne Phoenix	Perth Arena, Perth
18:30	Scoring by quarter: 22–17, 18–9, 20–31, 16–20
ESPN	Pts: Duke 21; Rebs: Windler 11; Asts: Duke 5	boxscore report	Pts: Hunter 18; Rebs: Hunter 8 Asts: Sobey 5	Attendance: 10,802

19 December 2025	Cairns Taipans	99–95	New Zealand Breakers	Cairns Convention Centre, Cairns
18:30	Scoring by quarter: 19–23, 29–20, 21–29, 30–23
ESPN	Pts: McVeigh 47; Rebs: Waardenburg 10; Asts: Andrews 9	boxscore report	Pts: Mennenga 24; Rebs: Mennenga 8 Asts: Jackson-Cartwright 11	Attendance: 3,749

20 December 2025	Illawarra Hawks	78–84	Adelaide 36ers	Wollongong Entertainment Centre, Wollongong
17:30	Scoring by quarter: 21–21, 18–20, 20–19, 19–24
ESPN	Pts: Peterson 21; Rebs: Hickey 10; Asts: Hickey 7	boxscore report	Pts: Cotton, Humphries 16; Rebs: Rakocevic 11; Asts: Cotton 7	Attendance: 4,432

20 December 2025	S.E. Melbourne Phoenix	107–78	Brisbane Bullets	John Cain Arena, Melbourne
20:00	Scoring by quarter: 22–17, 33–21, 25–12, 27–28
ESPN	Pts: Sobey 20; Rebs: Maldonado 5 Asts: Sobey 8	boxscore report	Pts: Freeman-Liberty 17; Rebs: Harrison 12; Asts: Norton 5	Attendance: 10,175

21 December 2025	Tasmania JackJumpers	85–94	Perth Wildcats	Derwent Entertainment Centre, Hobart
14:30	Scoring by quarter: 18–19, 24–25, 22–27, 21–23
Network 10	Pts: Hamilton 25; Rebs: Bannan 9 Asts: Hamilton 4	boxscore report	Pts: Doolittle 30; Rebs: Doolittle 6 Asts: Duke 5	Attendance: 4,340

21 December 2025	Sydney Kings	119–77	Cairns Taipans	Sydney SuperDome, Sydney
16:30	Scoring by quarter: 28–23, 29–18, 34–19, 28–17
10 Drama	Pts: Davis 21; Rebs: Cooks 6 Asts: Davis 9	boxscore report	Pts: Andrews, Stattmann 14; Rebs: Lee 6 Asts: Andrews 9	Attendance: 9,124

22 December 2025	Brisbane Bullets	99–85	New Zealand Breakers	Brisbane Entertainment Centre, Brisbane
18:30	Scoring by quarter: 26–20, 30–21, 23–22, 20–22
ESPN	Pts: Harrison 24; Rebs: Freeman-Liberty, Harrison 11; Asts: Freeman-Liberty 7	boxscore report	Pts: Jackson-Cartwright 26; Rebs: Davison 7 Asts: Jackson-Cartwright 4	Attendance: 4,538

23 December 2025	Melbourne United	73–92	Tasmania JackJumpers	John Cain Arena, Melbourne
20:00	Scoring by quarter: 19–22, 20–20, 9–23, 25–27
ESPN	Pts: Walker 15; Rebs: Krebs 5 Asts: Walker 6	boxscore report	Pts: Campbell 20; Rebs: Bannan 12; Asts: Bannan, Campbell 3	Attendance: 10,175

=== Round 14 ===
24 December 2025	Adelaide 36ers	93–73	Cairns Taipans	Adelaide Entertainment Centre, Adelaide
17:00	Scoring by quarter: 23–21, 27–21, 23–19, 20–12
ESPN	Pts: Cotton 22; Rebs: Rakocevic 13; Asts: Cotton 11	boxscore report	Pts: Waardenburg 19; Rebs: five players 5 Asts: Andrews 6	Attendance: 10,006

25 December 2025	Sydney Kings	108–84	Illawarra Hawks	Sydney SuperDome, Sydney
20:30	Scoring by quarter: 34–19, 28–22, 21–17, 25–26
ESPN	Pts: Davis 27; Rebs: Soares 7 Asts: Davis 9	boxscore report	Pts: McGee 20; Rebs: Froling 12; Asts: Hickey, Peterson 3	Attendance: 7,732

26 December 2025	Tasmania JackJumpers	80–81(OT)	New Zealand Breakers	Derwent Entertainment Centre, Hobart
19:30	Scoring by quarter: 18–25, 18–12, 19–14, 16–20, Overtime: 9–10
ESPN	Pts: Hamilton 23; Rebs: Marshall 10; Asts: three players 2	boxscore report	Pts: Mennenga 20; Rebs: Jackson-Cartwright, Mennenga 7 Asts: Jackson-Cartwright 10	Attendance: 4,340

27 December 2025	Brisbane Bullets	87–92	Melbourne United	Brisbane Entertainment Centre, Brisbane
19:00	Scoring by quarter: 26–28, 19–31, 26–21, 16–12
ESPN	Pts: Harrison 23; Rebs: Harrison 11; Asts: Norton, Taylor 6	boxscore report	Pts: Goulding 19; Rebs: Bowen 8 Asts: Doyle 8	Attendance: 4,299

28 December 2025	Adelaide 36ers	95–84	Perth Wildcats	Adelaide Entertainment Centre, Adelaide
14:00	Scoring by quarter: 20–29, 26–20, 29–9, 20–26
Network 10	Pts: Cotton 36; Rebs: Cheatham 9 Asts: Cotton 7	boxscore report	Pts: Doolittle 18; Rebs: Doolittle 6 Asts: Henshall 4	Attendance: 10,041

29 December 2025	Tasmania JackJumpers	87–84	S.E. Melbourne Phoenix	Derwent Entertainment Centre, Hobart
19:30	Scoring by quarter: 23–15, 26–18, 17–23, 21–28
ESPN	Pts: Deng 21; Rebs: Bannan, Deng 7 Asts: Ayre 5	boxscore report	Pts: Sobey 27; Rebs: Brown 10; Asts: Sobey 5	Attendance: 4,340

30 December 2025	Sydney Kings	95–70	Brisbane Bullets	Sydney SuperDome, Sydney
19:30	Scoring by quarter: 24–15, 27–15, 26–19, 21–18
ESPN	Pts: Cooks 20; Rebs: Goodrick 8 Asts: Davis 7	boxscore report	Pts: McDaniel 18; Rebs: Freeman-Liberty, Harrison 7 Asts: Norton 6	Attendance: 10,716

=== Round 15 ===
31 December 2025	Illawarra Hawks	92–90	Tasmania JackJumpers	Wollongong Entertainment Centre, Wollongong
17:30	Scoring by quarter: 23–18, 27–21, 23–26, 19–25
ESPN	Pts: Froling, McGee 16; Rebs: Froling 10; Asts: Peterson 5	boxscore report	Pts: Bannan 25; Rebs: Magnay 8 Asts: Marshall 4	Attendance: 5,359

31 December 2025	Cairns Taipans	96–111	S.E. Melbourne Phoenix	Cairns Convention Centre, Cairns
18:30	Scoring by quarter: 28–21, 24–27, 26–35, 18–28
ESPN	Pts: McVeigh 26; Rebs: Andrews 7 Asts: Andrews 9	boxscore report	Pts: Sobey 31; Rebs: three players 5 Asts: Sobey 10	Attendance: 4,870

1 January 2026	Brisbane Bullets	75–95	Perth Wildcats	Brisbane Entertainment Centre, Brisbane
18:30	Scoring by quarter: 16–25, 28–15, 11–31, 20–24
ESPN	Pts: Holt 17; Rebs: Holt 7 Asts: Norton 6	boxscore report	Pts: Lual-Acuil 17; Rebs: Lual-Acuil 8 Asts: Okwera 4	Attendance: 3,984

2 January 2026	Adelaide 36ers	85–79	Sydney Kings	Adelaide Entertainment Centre, Adelaide
19:00	Scoring by quarter: 19–26, 16–15, 21–18, 29–20
ESPN	Pts: Cameron 25; Rebs: Cheatham 13; Asts: Cotton 10	boxscore report	Pts: Davis 26; Rebs: Cooks 13; Asts: Davis 6	Attendance: 10,044

3 January 2026	Illawarra Hawks	96–78	Cairns Taipans	Wollongong Entertainment Centre, Wollongong
19:30	Scoring by quarter: 22–18, 23–31, 27–15, 24–14
ESPN	Pts: Harvey 18; Rebs: McGee 10; Asts: Hickey 6	boxscore report	Pts: Waardenburg 17; Rebs: Galloway 9 Asts: Andrews 6	Attendance: 4,921

3 January 2026	Tasmania JackJumpers	84–75	Melbourne United	Derwent Entertainment Centre, Hobart
20:00	Scoring by quarter: 19–16, 25–19, 19–15, 21–25
ESPN	Pts: Magnay 27; Rebs: Magnay 13; Asts: Campbell 8	boxscore report	Pts: Walker 20; Rebs: Edwards 9 Asts: Doyle 6	Attendance: 4,340

4 January 2026	New Zealand Breakers	91–99	Perth Wildcats	Spark Arena, Auckland
16:30	Scoring by quarter: 23–28, 22–20, 29–32, 17–19
Network 10	Pts: Mennenga 19; Rebs: Jackson-Cartwright, López 7 Asts: Jackson-Cartwright 7	boxscore report	Pts: Doolittle 21; Rebs: Windler 10; Asts: Henshall, Rillie 4	Attendance: 5,141

4 January 2026	Brisbane Bullets	86–97	Adelaide 36ers	Brisbane Entertainment Centre, Brisbane
15:30	Scoring by quarter: 20–15, 25–23, 20–30, 21–29
10 Drama	Pts: Ducas, Taylor 18; Rebs: Holt, Taylor 7 Asts: Maldonado 9	boxscore	Pts: Cotton 23; Rebs: Cheatham 8 Asts: Cheatham 10	Attendance: 5,406

5 January 2026	Sydney Kings	117–124	S.E. Melbourne Phoenix	Sydney SuperDome, Sydney
19:30	Scoring by quarter: 35–31, 25–28, 32–36, 25–29
ESPN	Pts: Davis 30; Rebs: Maluach 6 Asts: Davis 6	boxscore report	Pts: Sobey 26; Rebs: Brown 8 Asts: Sobey 5	Attendance: 10,825

=== Round 16 ===
7 January 2026	Melbourne United	92–93	Cairns Taipans	Bendigo Stadium, Bendigo
19:30	Scoring by quarter: 22–29, 23–14, 30–33, 17–17
ESPN	Pts: Goulding 27; Rebs: Krebs 8 Asts: Delany, Walker 4	boxscore report	Pts: McVeigh, Waardenburg 20; Rebs: McVeigh, Waardenburg 9 Asts: Andrews 13	Attendance: 4,003

8 January 2026	S.E. Melbourne Phoenix	124–113(OT)	Illawarra Hawks	State Basketball Centre, Melbourne
19:30	Scoring by quarter: 23–25, 32–25, 24–29, 27–27, Overtime: 18–7
ESPN	Pts: Sobey 37; Rebs: Foxwell, Iwundu 7 Asts: Foxwell 6	boxscore report	Pts: Froling, Peterson 22; Rebs: Froling, McGee 9 Asts: Hickey 7	Attendance: 3,422

9 January 2026	New Zealand Breakers	62–103	Sydney Kings	Spark Arena, Auckland
19:30	Scoring by quarter: 17–22, 4–27, 19–25, 22–28
Sky Sport	Pts: López 11; Rebs: Mennenga 6 Asts: Jackson-Cartwright 3	boxscore report	Pts: Noi 18; Rebs: four players 7 Asts: Davis, Dellavedova 7	Attendance: 3,229

9 January 2026	Adelaide 36ers	72–80	Tasmania JackJumpers	Adelaide Entertainment Centre, Adelaide
19:00	Scoring by quarter: 16–13, 11–27, 24–20, 21–20
ESPN	Pts: Cameron 25; Rebs: Cheatham 12; Asts: Cotton 5	boxscore report	Pts: Hamilton 16; Rebs: Bannan 9 Asts: Bannan 3	Attendance: 10,041

10 January 2026	S.E. Melbourne Phoenix	97–107	Perth Wildcats	State Basketball Centre, Melbourne
20:00	Scoring by quarter: 26–32, 24–26, 25–21, 22–28
ESPN	Pts: Iwundu 27; Rebs: Glover 7 Asts: Sobey 8	boxscore report	Pts: Windler 27; Rebs: Doolittle 12; Asts: Doolittle, Rillie 4	Attendance: 3,422

11 January 2026	Illawarra Hawks	96–101	New Zealand Breakers	Wollongong Entertainment Centre, Wollongong
14:30	Scoring by quarter: 25–28, 18–21, 23–22, 30–30
ESPN	Pts: Peterson 22; Rebs: Blanchfield 7 Asts: three players 6	boxscore report	Pts: Jackson-Cartwright 23; Rebs: Jackson-Cartwright 7 Asts: Jackson-Cartwright 8	Attendance: 5,323

11 January 2026	Sydney Kings	97–94	Melbourne United	Sydney SuperDome, Sydney
16:30	Scoring by quarter: 26–23, 30–25, 23–25, 18–21
10 Drama	Pts: Galloway 27; Rebs: Goodrick, Maluach 9 Asts: Davis 6	boxscore report	Pts: Edwards 23; Rebs: Krebs 9 Asts: Doyle 8	Attendance: 12,634

12 January 2026	Cairns Taipans	88–83	Brisbane Bullets	Cairns Convention Centre, Cairns
18:30	Scoring by quarter: 28–16, 19–19, 21–27, 20–21
ESPN	Pts: McVeigh 25; Rebs: McVeigh 6 Asts: Andrews 13	boxscore report	Pts: Maldonado 31; Rebs: Taylor 8 Asts: Maldonado 5	Attendance: 3,872
Note: Postponed (cyclone)

=== Round 17 ===
15 January 2026	Sydney Kings	95–80	Brisbane Bullets	Perth Arena, Perth
18:30	Scoring by quarter: 29–23, 23–18, 23–17, 20–22
ESPN	Pts: Noi 24; Rebs: Noi 10; Asts: Davis 10	boxscore report	Pts: Maldonado 20; Rebs: Taylor 10; Asts: Maldonado 5	Attendance: 8,981

16 January 2026	Perth Wildcats	92–87	Illawarra Hawks	Perth Arena, Perth
18:30	Scoring by quarter: 18–13, 26–24, 21–21, 27–29
ESPN	Pts: Doolittle 21; Rebs: Doolittle 11; Asts: Henshall 7	boxscore report	Pts: Blanchfield 16; Rebs: McGee 14; Asts: Hickey 7	Attendance: 12,507

17 January 2026	Cairns Taipans	86–104	New Zealand Breakers	Perth Arena, Perth
16:00	Scoring by quarter: 21–26, 30–29, 17–25, 18–24
ESPN	Pts: King, Schofield 19; Rebs: McVeigh 8 Asts: McVeigh 8	boxscore report	Pts: Mennenga 28; Rebs: López 11; Asts: Jackson-Cartwright 10	Attendance: 7,034

17 January 2026	Melbourne United	79–77	Tasmania JackJumpers	Perth Arena, Perth
18:30	Scoring by quarter: 23–21, 20–21, 18–17, 18–18
ESPN	Pts: Edwards 21; Rebs: Edwards 10; Asts: Walker 6	boxscore report	Pts: Hamilton, Magnay 17; Rebs: Bannan 12; Asts: Magnay 4	Attendance: 7,072

18 January 2026	Adelaide 36ers	89–108	S.E. Melbourne Phoenix	Perth Arena, Perth
11:30	Scoring by quarter: 23–31, 20–22, 26–28, 20–27
Network 10	Pts: Cotton 30; Rebs: Cheatham 10; Asts: Cotton 6	boxscore report	Pts: Clark 27; Rebs: Hunter 9 Asts: Foxwell 12	Attendance: 6,953

=== Round 18 ===
21 January 2026	Melbourne United	98–66	Brisbane Bullets	Bendigo Stadium, Bendigo
17:30	Scoring by quarter: 29–19, 28–17, 24–14, 17–16
ESPN	Pts: Walker 17; Rebs: Krslovic 8 Asts: Walker 5	boxscore report	Pts: Holt 23; Rebs: Holt 8 Asts: Maldonado, Taylor 4	Attendance: 3,978

21 January 2026	S.E. Melbourne Phoenix	123–116	New Zealand Breakers	State Basketball Centre, Melbourne
19:30	Scoring by quarter: 38–28, 36–26, 26–31, 23–31
ESPN	Pts: Clark 24; Rebs: Brown 9 Asts: Sobey 7	boxscore report	Pts: Mennenga 28; Rebs: López 8 Asts: Jackson-Cartwright 9	Attendance: 3,422

22 January 2026	Sydney Kings	105–94	Tasmania JackJumpers	Sydney SuperDome, Sydney
19:30	Scoring by quarter: 26–14, 26–22, 31–28, 22–30
ESPN	Pts: Davis 40; Rebs: Soares 8 Asts: Davis 8	boxscore report	Pts: Johnson 23; Rebs: Bannan 15; Asts: Campbell 6	Attendance: 9,234

22 January 2026	Perth Wildcats	106–69	Cairns Taipans	Perth Arena, Perth
18:30	Scoring by quarter: 30–25, 24–18, 38–13, 14–13
ESPN	Pts: Pepper 25; Rebs: Lual-Acuil 6 Asts: Henshall 7	boxscore report	Pts: McVeigh 34; Rebs: three players 4 Asts: Andrews 8	Attendance: 11,377

23 January 2026	New Zealand Breakers	110–112(OT)	Adelaide 36ers	Spark Arena, Auckland
19:30	Scoring by quarter: 22–23, 22–25, 27–22, 22–23, Overtime: 17–19
Sky Sport	Pts: three players 21; Rebs: Mennenga 12; Asts: Jackson-Cartwright 10	boxscore report	Pts: Cotton 33; Rebs: Cheatham 11; Asts: Cotton 9	Attendance: 3,866

24 January 2026	S.E. Melbourne Phoenix	118–91	Cairns Taipans	State Basketball Centre, Melbourne
17:30	Scoring by quarter: 16–26, 33–26, 32–15, 37–24
ESPN	Pts: Glover 22; Rebs: Brown 8 Asts: Sobey 9	boxscore report	Pts: McVeigh 21; Rebs: King 8 Asts: Andrews 11	Attendance: 3,422

24 January 2026	Tasmania JackJumpers	91–101	Illawarra Hawks	Derwent Entertainment Centre, Hobart
20:00	Scoring by quarter: 26–27, 22–33, 26–22, 27–19
ESPN	Pts: Bannan 26; Rebs: Bannan, Johnson 8 Asts: Marshall 7	boxscore report	Pts: McGee 23; Rebs: McGee 8 Asts: Hickey, Peterson 6	Attendance: 4,340

25 January 2026	Sydney Kings	106–101	Adelaide 36ers	Sydney SuperDome, Sydney
14:30	Scoring by quarter: 22–20, 37–26, 25–24, 22–31
Network 10	Pts: Craig 26; Rebs: Craig, Galloway 8 Asts: Davis 14	boxscore report	Pts: Jenkins 20; Rebs: Humphries 10; Asts: Cotton 9	Attendance: 16,846

25 January 2026	Perth Wildcats	73–74	Melbourne United	Perth Arena, Perth
13:30	Scoring by quarter: 24–12, 16–26, 12–12, 21–24
10 Drama	Pts: Lual-Acuil 24; Rebs: Lual-Acuil 11; Asts: three players 3	boxscore report	Pts: Doyle 24; Rebs: Edwards 17; Asts: Doyle 8	Attendance: 12,707

26 January 2026	Brisbane Bullets	75–113	Illawarra Hawks	Brisbane Entertainment Centre, Brisbane
18:30	Scoring by quarter: 11–22, 20–33, 21–41, 23–17
ESPN	Pts: Maldonado 20; Rebs: Murray, Taylor 6 Asts: Murray 5	boxscore report	Pts: Harvey 22; Rebs: McGee 10; Asts: Hickey 7	Attendance: 4,075

=== Round 19 ===
28 January 2026	Brisbane Bullets	74–107	Adelaide 36ers	Gold Coast Sports Centre, Gold Coast
18:30	Scoring by quarter: 24–33, 22–19, 9–16, 19–39
ESPN	Pts: Holt 24; Rebs: Taylor 10; Asts: Maldonado 8	boxscore report	Pts: Cotton 22; Rebs: Cheatham 7 Asts: Cotton 8	Attendance: 2,441

28 January 2026	Perth Wildcats	101–93	S.E. Melbourne Phoenix	Perth Arena, Perth
18:30	Scoring by quarter: 24–32, 25–19, 26–26, 26–16
ESPN	Pts: Windler 23; Rebs: Windler 11; Asts: Henshall 9	boxscore report	Pts: Sobey 28; Rebs: Brown 14; Asts: Iwundu 4	Attendance: 6,245

29 January 2026	Sydney Kings	122–104	Illawarra Hawks	Sydney SuperDome, Sydney
19:30	Scoring by quarter: 28–22, 35–23, 28–29, 31–30
ESPN	Pts: Soares 23; Rebs: three players 6 Asts: Davis 9	boxscore report	Pts: Harvey 25; Rebs: McGee 9 Asts: Froling, Hickey 5	Attendance: 7,740

30 January 2026	New Zealand Breakers	97–95	Melbourne United	Spark Arena, Auckland
19:30	Scoring by quarter: 28–21, 21–27, 22–25, 26–22
Sky Sport	Pts: López 32; Rebs: López 8 Asts: three players 3	boxscore report	Pts: Edwards 23; Rebs: Edwards 14; Asts: Doyle 9	Attendance: 4,917

30 January 2026	Cairns Taipans	96–93(OT)	Tasmania JackJumpers	Cairns Convention Centre, Cairns
18:30	Scoring by quarter: 27–17, 27–22, 17–26, 13–19, Overtime: 12–9
ESPN	Pts: McVeigh 40; Rebs: Lee 10; Asts: Adnam 4	boxscore report	Pts: Deng 28; Rebs: Bannan 15; Asts: Campbell 6	Attendance: 3,862

31 January 2026	Adelaide 36ers	77–97	S.E. Melbourne Phoenix	Adelaide Entertainment Centre, Adelaide
17:00	Scoring by quarter: 18–18, 22–30, 16–23, 21–26
ESPN	Pts: Cotton 26; Rebs: Cheatham 14; Asts: Cotton 6	boxscore report	Pts: Sobey 19; Rebs: Brown 13; Asts: Brown, Foxwell 5	Attendance: 10,047

31 January 2026	Illawarra Hawks	99–106	Perth Wildcats	Wollongong Entertainment Centre, Wollongong
20:00	Scoring by quarter: 30–25, 24–23, 20–32, 25–26
ESPN	Pts: Peterson 22; Rebs: McGee 11; Asts: Hickey, Peterson 6	boxscore report	Pts: Doolittle 26; Rebs: Henshall 9 Asts: Henshall 6	Attendance: 4,234

1 February 2026	Tasmania JackJumpers	91–89	New Zealand Breakers	Derwent Entertainment Centre, Hobart
14:30	Scoring by quarter: 25–22, 28–25, 25–24, 13–18
Network 10	Pts: Johnson 33; Rebs: Bannan 11; Asts: Campbell 9	boxscore report	Pts: Brockington 24; Rebs: Brockington, Jackson-Cartwright 7 Asts: Jackson-Cartwright 5	Attendance: 4,340

1 February 2026	Cairns Taipans	92–106	Sydney Kings	Cairns Convention Centre, Cairns
15:30	Scoring by quarter: 34–17, 20–28, 22–26, 16–35
10 Drama	Pts: Barker 18; Rebs: King 9 Asts: Andrews 10	boxscore report	Pts: Davis 35; Rebs: Cooks, Davis 7 Asts: Dellavedova 7	Attendance: 4,002

=== Round 20 ===
5 February 2026	New Zealand Breakers	83–114	S.E. Melbourne Phoenix	Eventfinda Stadium, Auckland
19:30	Scoring by quarter: 20–17, 32–35, 15–34, 16–28
Sky Sport	Pts: Brockington 19; Rebs: Webster 8 Asts: Jackson-Cartwright 5	boxscore report	Pts: Clark 23; Rebs: Hunter, Lewis 10; Asts: Lewis 6	Attendance: 1,703

5 February 2026	Illawarra Hawks	100–99	Adelaide 36ers	Wollongong Entertainment Centre, Wollongong
19:30	Scoring by quarter: 27–21, 18–30, 24–27, 31–21
ESPN	Pts: Harvey, Hickey 22; Rebs: McGee 14; Asts: Hickey 10	boxscore report	Pts: Cotton 28; Rebs: Cheatham 12; Asts: Cotton 9	Attendance: 3,457

6 February 2026	Tasmania JackJumpers	114–70	Brisbane Bullets	Derwent Entertainment Centre, Hobart
19:30	Scoring by quarter: 33–14, 24–17, 30–17, 27–22
ESPN	Pts: Marshall 31; Rebs: Bannan 9 Asts: Deng, Johnson 5	boxscore report	Pts: Maldonado 18; Rebs: Holt 9 Asts: Murray 3	Attendance: 4,340

6 February 2026	Perth Wildcats	98–84	Cairns Taipans	Perth Arena, Perth
18:30	Scoring by quarter: 22–22, 28–18, 18–19, 30–25
ESPN	Pts: Doolittle 32; Rebs: Windler 11; Asts: Henshall 5	boxscore report	Pts: Andrews 25; Rebs: King 8 Asts: Andrews 7	Attendance: 11,161

7 February 2026	New Zealand Breakers	106–95	Illawarra Hawks	Spark Arena, Auckland
19:30	Scoring by quarter: 33–25, 28–25, 23–30, 22–15
Sky Sport	Pts: Brockington 27; Rebs: Jackson-Cartwright 8 Asts: Jackson-Cartwright 6	boxscore report	Pts: Blanchfield, Harvey 19; Rebs: Hickey 10; Asts: Hickey 9	Attendance: 2,750

7 February 2026	Melbourne United	76–87	Adelaide 36ers	John Cain Arena, Melbourne
20:00	Scoring by quarter: 23–29, 16–12, 14–26, 23–20
ESPN	Pts: Goulding 18; Rebs: Edwards 8 Asts: Walker 4	boxscore report	Pts: Rakocevic 20; Rebs: Rakocevic 12; Asts: Cameron 8	Attendance: 10,175

8 February 2026	S.E. Melbourne Phoenix	88–114	Sydney Kings	John Cain Arena, Melbourne
14:30	Scoring by quarter: 29–33, 25–22, 23–30, 11–29
Network 10	Pts: Brown, Sobey 15; Rebs: Hunter 7 Asts: Foxwell 7	boxscore report	Pts: Davis 30; Rebs: Craig, Soares 6 Asts: Davis 9	Attendance: 10,175

8 February 2026	Brisbane Bullets	72–81	Cairns Taipans	Brisbane Entertainment Centre, Brisbane
15:30	Scoring by quarter: 13–24, 23–19, 21–18, 15–20
10 Drama	Pts: Taylor 25; Rebs: Holt 11; Asts: Norton 4	boxscore report	Pts: McVeigh 22; Rebs: King 11; Asts: Andrews 10	Attendance: 5,443

=== Round 21 ===
12 February 2026	Cairns Taipans	85–89	Melbourne United	Cairns Convention Centre, Cairns
18:30	Scoring by quarter: 19–19, 27–21, 14–16, 25–33
ESPN	Pts: McVeigh 25; Rebs: Andrews 9 Asts: Andrews 7	boxscore report	Pts: Doyle 25; Rebs: Edwards 13; Asts: Krslovic 5	Attendance: 3,650

13 February 2026	Illawarra Hawks	94–120	Sydney Kings	Wollongong Entertainment Centre, Wollongong
19:30	Scoring by quarter: 19–34, 27–24, 23–26, 25–36
ESPN	Pts: Harvey 16; Rebs: Peatling 9 Asts: Froling, Harvey 5	boxscore report	Pts: Davis 24; Rebs: Robertson, Soares 7 Asts: Davis 9	Attendance: 5,098

13 February 2026	Perth Wildcats	94–75	Brisbane Bullets	Perth Arena, Perth
18:30	Scoring by quarter: 29–19, 22–18, 25–18, 18–20
ESPN	Pts: Doolittle 28; Rebs: Lual-Acuil 8 Asts: Doolittle 6	boxscore report	Pts: Maldonado 18; Rebs: Holt 7 Asts: Maldonado 7	Attendance: 11,447

14 February 2026	Adelaide 36ers	92–89	New Zealand Breakers	Adelaide Entertainment Centre, Adelaide
17:00	Scoring by quarter: 16–29, 23–21, 20–21, 33–18
ESPN	Pts: Cotton 42; Rebs: Cheatham 12; Asts: Cheatham 8	boxscore report	Pts: Jackson-Cartwright 25; Rebs: Bairstow 8 Asts: Jackson-Cartwright 7	Attendance: 10,044

14 February 2026	S.E. Melbourne Phoenix	120–104	Tasmania JackJumpers	John Cain Arena, Melbourne
20:00	Scoring by quarter: 32–34, 35–22, 35–23, 18–25
ESPN	Pts: Glover 21; Rebs: Glover 7 Asts: Sobey 9	boxscore report	Pts: Deng 36; Rebs: Bannan 10; Asts: Campbell 9	Attendance: 7,328

15 February 2026	Melbourne United	91–100	Illawarra Hawks	John Cain Arena, Melbourne
14:30	Scoring by quarter: 24–29, 21–25, 18–23, 28–23
Network 10	Pts: Walker 30; Rebs: Edwards 9 Asts: Doyle 6	boxscore report	Pts: McGee 22; Rebs: McGee 13; Asts: Peterson 6	Attendance: 10,175

15 February 2026	Sydney Kings	102–84	Perth Wildcats	Sydney SuperDome, Sydney
16:30	Scoring by quarter: 28–29, 27–16, 24–19, 23–20
10 Drama	Pts: Davis 30; Rebs: Cooks 10; Asts: Davis 10	boxscore report	Pts: Doolittle 19; Rebs: Pepper 10; Asts: Wagstaff 3	Attendance: 13,613

=== Round 22 ===
18 February 2026	Tasmania JackJumpers	70–103	Illawarra Hawks	Derwent Entertainment Centre, Hobart
19:30	Scoring by quarter: 18–26, 16–28, 17–27, 19–22
ESPN	Pts: Bannan, Campbell 17; Rebs: Johnson 6 Asts: three players 2	boxscore report	Pts: Harvey 21; Rebs: Froling, McGee 10; Asts: Harvey 4	Attendance: 4,340

19 February 2026	New Zealand Breakers	115–84	Cairns Taipans	Eventfinda Stadium, Auckland
19:30	Scoring by quarter: 24–24, 37–20, 27–22, 27–18
Sky Sport	Pts: Mennenga 32; Rebs: Davison 11; Asts: Jackson-Cartwright 13	boxscore report	Pts: Andrews 24; Rebs: McVeigh 7 Asts: Andrews 7	Attendance: 1,791

19 February 2026	Melbourne United	95–91	S.E. Melbourne Phoenix	John Cain Arena, Melbourne
19:30	Scoring by quarter: 33–23, 19–19, 16–30, 27–19
ESPN	Pts: Doyle 25; Rebs: Edwards 11; Asts: Walker 5	boxscore report	Pts: Sobey 29; Rebs: Sobey 7 Asts: Lewis 4	Attendance: 8,919

20 February 2026	Brisbane Bullets	77–117	Sydney Kings	Brisbane Entertainment Centre, Brisbane
18:30	Scoring by quarter: 33–26, 17–32, 10–32, 17–27
ESPN	Pts: Maldonado 16; Rebs: Ducas 6 Asts: Maldonado 6	boxscore report	Pts: Davis 31; Rebs: Cooks 8 Asts: Davis 8	Attendance: 4,932

20 February 2026	Perth Wildcats	86–74	Adelaide 36ers	Perth Arena, Perth
18:30	Scoring by quarter: 19–17, 29–17, 17–24, 21–16
ESPN	Pts: Pepper 22; Rebs: Wagstaff 7 Asts: Doolittle 8	boxscore report	Pts: Rakocevic 18; Rebs: Cheatham 11; Asts: Cameron 7	Attendance: 13,574

== Ladder ==
Pos	2025–26 NBL season											
Pos	Team	Pld	W	L	PCT	Last 5	Streak	Home	Away	PF	PA	PP
1	Sydney Kings	33	24	9	72.73%	5–0	W11	13–4	11–5	3276	2879	113.79%
2	Adelaide 36ers	33	23	10	69.70%	2–3	L1	12–5	11–5	3042	2890	105.26%
3	S.E. Melbourne Phoenix	33	22	11	66.67%	3–2	L1	11–5	11–6	3324	3061	108.59%
4	Perth Wildcats	33	21	12	63.64%	4–1	W1	10–7	11–5	2996	2840	105.49%
5	Melbourne United	33	20	13	60.61%	2–3	W1	11–6	9–7	3041	2905	104.68%
6	Tasmania JackJumpers	33	14	19	42.42%	2–3	L2	6–10	8–9	2873	2884	99.62%
7	New Zealand Breakers	33	13	20	39.39%	2–3	W1	7–9	6–11	3022	3058	98.82%
8	Illawarra Hawks	33	13	20	39.39%	3–2	W2	7–9	6–11	3074	3205	95.91%
9	Cairns Taipans	33	9	24	27.27%	1–4	L2	4–13	5–11	2754	3194	86.22%
10	Brisbane Bullets	33	6	27	18.18%	0–5	L13	2–14	4–13	2710	3196	84.79%

Updated to match(es) played on 20 February 2026. Source: NBL.com.au

The NBL tie-breaker system as outlined in the NBL Rules and Regulations states that in the case of an identical win–loss record, the overall points percentage will determine order of seeding.

=== Ladder progression ===
Leader and qualification to semifinals
Qualification to semifinals
Qualification to play-in
Last place

2025–26 NBL season
Team ╲ Round	1	2	3	4	5	6	7	8	9	10	11	12	13	14	15	16	17	18	19	20	21	22
Adelaide 36ers	—	2	1	2	2	3	3	3	2	2	1	1	1	1	1	1	1	1	1	1	2	2
Brisbane Bullets	3	7	8	9	7	7	7	7	8	8	9	9	9	9	9	10	10	10	10	10	10	10
Cairns Taipans	7	4	7	7	8	10	9	10	10	10	10	10	10	10	10	9	9	9	9	9	9	9
Illawarra Hawks	—	9	9	8	10	8	10	8	7	9	8	8	8	8	7	8	8	7	8	8	8	8
Melbourne United	2	1	2	1	1	1	1	1	1	1	2	2	3	2	3	4	4	4	4	5	5	5
New Zealand Breakers	6	10	10	10	9	9	8	9	9	7	6	7	7	7	8	7	7	8	7	7	7	7
Perth Wildcats	5	6	4	3	6	5	5	5	5	4	4	5	5	5	5	5	5	5	5	4	4	4
S.E. Melbourne Phoenix	1	5	6	4	3	2	2	2	3	3	3	3	2	4	2	2	2	2	3	3	3	3
Sydney Kings	—	8	5	6	5	6	4	4	4	5	5	4	4	3	4	3	3	3	2	2	1	1
Tasmania JackJumpers	4	3	3	5	4	4	6	6	6	6	7	6	6	6	6	6	6	6	6	6	6	6

Updated to match(es) played on 20 February 2026. Source: NBL.com.au

== NBL Ignite Cup ==
The NBL introduced the new NBL Ignite Cup tournament for the 2025–26 season, with all games except the championship final counting towards the regular-season standings.

Pos	Team	Pld	W	L	PF	PA	PP	BP	Pts	Qualification
1	Adelaide 36ers	4	3	1	390	329	118.5	12	21	Ignite Cup final
2	New Zealand Breakers	4	3	1	441	385	114.5	11	20	Ignite Cup final
3	Perth Wildcats	4	3	1	399	365	109.3	9.5	18.5	
4	Melbourne United	4	2	2	390	359	108.6	9.5	15.5	
5	Tasmania JackJumpers	4	2	2	349	338	103.3	8.5	14.5	
6	S.E. Melbourne Phoenix	4	2	2	408	402	101.5	8	14	
7	Illawarra Hawks	4	2	2	372	397	93.7	7	13	
8	Brisbane Bullets	4	1	3	334	411	81.3	6	9	
9	Sydney Kings	4	1	3	350	381	91.9	5	8	
10	Cairns Taipans	4	1	3	340	406	83.7	3.5	6.5	

Updated to match(es) played on 28 January 2026. Source: Ignitecup.com.au

=== Championship game ===
22 February 2026	Adelaide 36ers	107–111	New Zealand Breakers	Gold Coast Convention Centre, Gold Coast
15:30	Scoring by quarter: 25–28, 29–19, 28–34, 25–30
10 Drama	Pts: Cotton 34; Rebs: Rakocevic 11; Asts: Cotton 9	boxscore report	Pts: Jackson-Cartwright 29; Rebs: López, Te Rangi 8 Asts: López, Jackson-Cartwright 5	Attendance: 5,078

== Finals ==
The 2026 NBL Finals will be played in March and April 2026, consisting of three play-in games, two best-of-three semifinal series and the best-of-five NBL Championship series. In the semifinals, the higher seed hosts the first and third games. In the Championship Series, the higher seed hosts the first, third and fifth games.

The top two seeds in the regular season will automatically qualify to the semifinals. Teams ranked three to six will compete in the play-in tournament. The third seed will play the fourth seed for third spot and the loser will play the winner of fifth or sixth for the fourth spot.

=== Playoff Bracket ===
Play-in / Seeding qualifier
5	Melbourne United	82
6	Tasmania JackJumpers	68
3	S.E. Melbourne Phoenix	111
4	Perth Wildcats	94

Play-in game
4	Perth Wildcats	95
5	Melbourne United	77

Semifinals
1	Sydney Kings	105	89	X
4	Perth Wildcats	104	75	X
2	Adelaide 36ers	104	92	108
3	S.E. Melbourne Phoenix	97	101	96

Championship
1	Sydney Kings	112	89	106	91	113
2	Adelaide 36ers	68	91	93	92	101

== Awards ==
=== Pre-season ===
- Loggins-Bruton Cup: New Zealand Breakers
- Most Valuable Player (Ray Borner Medal): Izaiah Brockington (New Zealand Breakers)

=== Regular season ===
==== Awards Night ====
- Most Valuable Player (Andrew Gaze Trophy): Bryce Cotton (Adelaide 36ers)
- Next Generation Award: Sam Mennenga (New Zealand Breakers)
- Best Defensive Player (Damian Martin Trophy): John Brown (S.E. Melbourne Phoenix)
- Best Sixth Man: Angus Glover (S.E. Melbourne Phoenix)
- Most Improved Player: Flynn Cameron (Adelaide 36ers)
- Fans MVP: Bryce Cotton (Adelaide 36ers)
- Coach of the Year (Lindsay Gaze Trophy): Brian Goorjian (Sydney Kings)
- Executive of the Year: Nic Barbato (Adelaide 36ers)
- Referee of the Year: Michael Aylen
- GameTime by Kmart: Malith Machar (Melbourne United)
- Three-Pointer of the Year: Bryce Cotton (Adelaide 36ers)
- Dunk of the Year: Sam Mennenga (New Zealand Breakers)
- All-NBL First Team:
  - Bryce Cotton (Adelaide 36ers)
  - Kendric Davis (Sydney Kings)
  - Nathan Sobey (S.E. Melbourne Phoenix)
  - Kristian Doolittle (Perth Wildcats)
  - John Brown (S.E. Melbourne Phoenix)
- All-NBL Second Team:
  - Jack McVeigh (Cairns Taipans)
  - Parker Jackson-Cartwright (New Zealand Breakers)
  - Xavier Cooks (Sydney Kings)
  - Bryce Hamilton (Tasmania JackJumpers)
  - Zylan Cheatham (Adelaide 36ers)

=== Postseason ===
- Championship Series MVP (Larry Sengstock Medal): Kendric Davis (Sydney Kings)
- NBL Champions: Sydney Kings (6th title)

== NBL clubs in international competitions ==
Team	Competition	Progress	Result	W–L
Illawarra Hawks	Intercontinental Cup	Group stage	Loss vs. (Brazilian Basketball Confederation) Flamengo	1–2
Illawarra Hawks	Intercontinental Cup	Group stage	Loss vs. (USA Basketball) NBA G League United	1–2
Illawarra Hawks	Intercontinental Cup	Fifth place	Win vs. (Japan Basketball Association) Utsunomiya Brex	1–2

- As reigning NBL champions, the Hawks will compete in the 2025 FIBA Intercontinental Cup, becoming the second team from Oceania to play in the FIBA Intercontinental Cup.
