= Stu Lash =

American basketball coach and executive

Personal information
- Born: c. 1976 (age 49–50)

Career information
- College: UMass Amherst
- Coaching career: 2000–2002, 2025

Career history

Coaching
- 2000–2002: Valley Stream South HS
- 2025: Brisbane Bullets

Stuart Lash (born c. 1976) is an American professional basketball executive and coach. He was the director of player personnel and basketball development for the Memphis Grizzlies of the National Basketball Association (NBA) from 2012 to 2014. Lash was the head coach for the Brisbane Bullets of the Australian National Basketball League (NBL) in 2025.

== Early life ==
Lash is a native of New York. He graduated from the University of Massachusetts Amherst in 1999 with a bachelor's degree in sports management. Lash worked as a student manager of the UMass Minutemen basketball team. He served as head coach of the boys' varsity basketball team at Valley Stream South High School in New York from 2000 to 2002.

== Professional career ==
Lash worked for the Denver Nuggets of the National Basketball Association (NBA) as the scouting and video coordinator from 2002 to 2006. He was responsible for draft analysis, scouting efforts and preparation for upcoming games.

Lash served as vice president of basketball for Lagardère Unlimited from 2009 to 2012. He was previously the director of basketball and business affairs for Levien Sports Representatives from 2006.

On December 13, 2012, Lash was announced as director of player personnel and basketball development for the Memphis Grizzlies of the NBA. On May 19, 2014, he departed the team alongside CEO Jason Levien.

On January 13, 2023, Lash joined the Brisbane Bullets of the Australian National Basketball League (NBL) as senior basketball advisor. He was reunited with Levien who is a co-owner of the Bullets. On April 3, 2025, Lash was appointed as head coach of the Bullets on a three-year contract. He had formerly been involved in the search for a head coach as a decision-maker when the team's ownership suggested that he might be a suitable candidate. After guiding the team to a 5–13 record to start the 2025–26 NBL season, Lash stepped down as head coach on December 18, 2025.

== Personal life ==
Lash is married and has two children.
