= Izaiah Brockington =

American basketball player (born 1999)

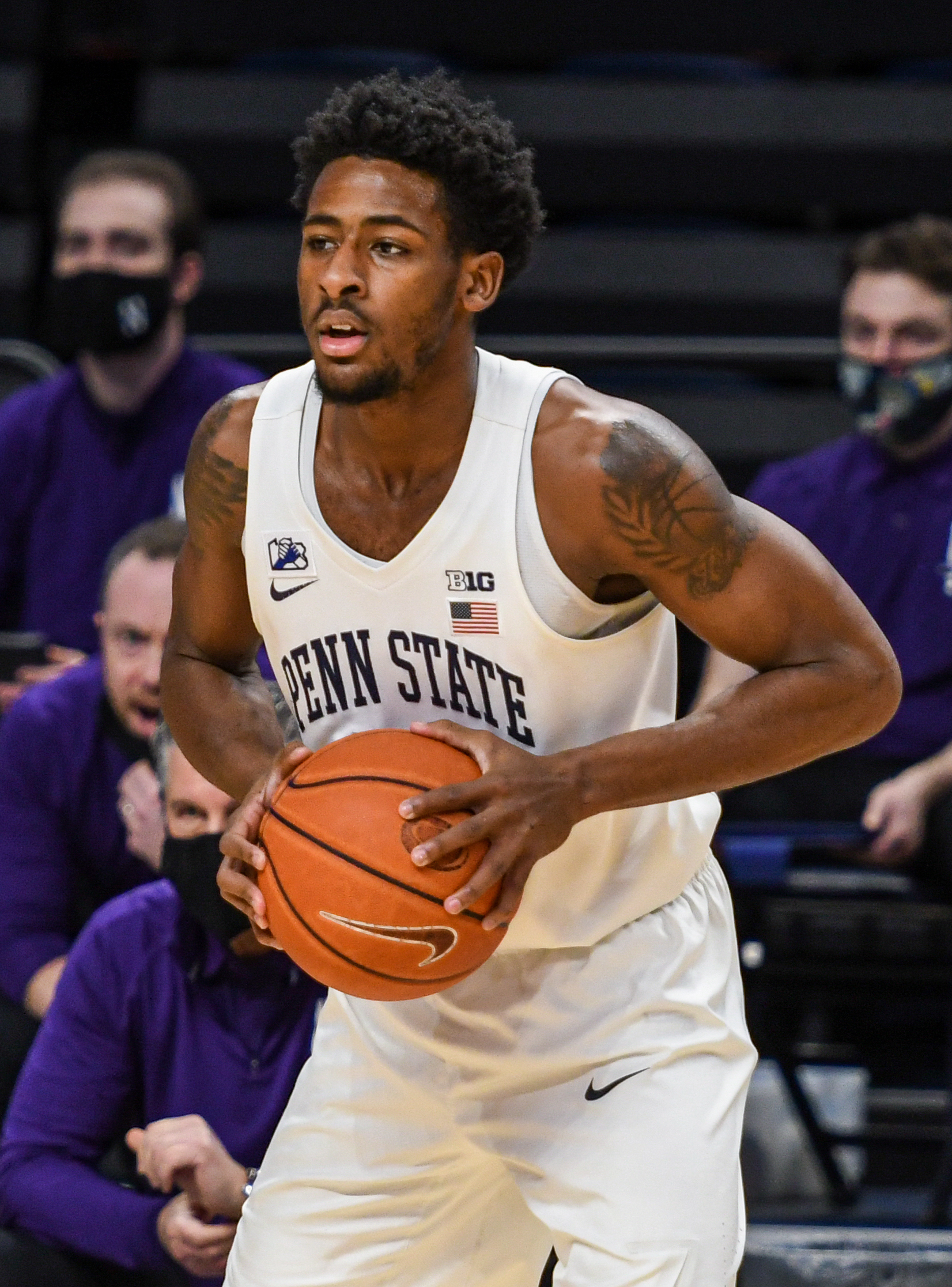
- Brockington with Penn State in 2021

No. 21 – Tezenis Verona
- Position: Shooting guard
- League: LBA

Personal information
- Born: July 12, 1999 (age 27) Towson, Maryland, U.S.
- Listed height: 6 ft 4 in (1.93 m)
- Listed weight: 196 lb (89 kg)

Career information
- High school: Archbishop Ryan (Philadelphia, Pennsylvania)
- College: St. Bonaventure (2017–2018); Penn State (2019–2021); Iowa State (2021–2022)
- NBA draft: 2022: undrafted
- Playing career: 2023–present

Career history
- 2023–2025: Birmingham Squadron
- 2024: New Orleans Pelicans
- 2024: →Birmingham Squadron
- 2025: San Diego Clippers
- 2025: Vancouver Bandits
- 2025–2026: New Zealand Breakers
- 2026: Liaoning Flying Leopards
- 2026–present: Scaligera Basket Verona

Career highlights
- NBL Ignite Cup winner (2026); First-team All-Big 12 (2022); Big 12 Newcomer of the Year (2022)
- Stats at NBA.com
- Stats at Basketball Reference

Izaiah Antoine Brockington (born July 12, 1999) is an American professional basketball player for Scaligera Basket Verona of the Italian Lega Basket Serie A (LBA). He played college basketball for the St. Bonaventure Bonnies, Penn State Nittany Lions, and Iowa State Cyclones.

== High school career ==
Brockington played basketball for Archbishop Ryan High School in Philadelphia, Pennsylvania. He entered the starting lineup as a sophomore. In his senior season, Brockington averaged 18.6 points per game and led his team to its first Class 6A semifinals appearance. He finished his high school career with 1,242 career points, becoming the third 1,000-point scorer in program history. Brockington originally committed to playing college basketball for NJIT in August 2016, before announcing he would do a prep year at Woodstock Academy in Woodstock, Connecticut. In August 2017, he instead signed with St. Bonaventure.

== College career ==
As a freshman at St. Bonaventure, Brockington averaged 4.3 points and 1.2 rebounds per game. He transferred to Penn State for his sophomore season. Brockington sat out for one season due to NCAA transfer rules. He assumed a sixth man role as a sophomore, averaging 8.1 points and 2.7 rebounds per game. In his junior year, Brockington became a regular starter, and averaged 12.6 points, 4.9 rebounds and 1.7 assists per game. He scored a season-high 24 points against Virginia Tech and had 18 double-figure scoring performances. For his senior season, Brockington transferred to Iowa State. He entered the 2021 NBA draft before withdrawing his name. On November 24, 2021, Brockington scored 30 points in an 82–70 win against Xavier. He scored a career-high 35 points in an 84–81 win against West Virginia on February 23, 2022. For the season, Brockington averaged 16.9 points, 6.8 rebounds, and 1.6 assists per game. He was named to the First Team All-Big 12 as well as Big 12 Newcomer of the Year. On March 28, 2022, Brockington announced he would forego his additional year of eligibility and declare for the 2022 NBA draft.

== Professional career ==
=== Birmingham Squadron / New Orleans Pelicans (2023–2025) ===
Brockington suffered an ACL injury during a pre-draft workout. He subsequently went undrafted in the 2022 NBA draft. On September 13, 2022, Brockington signed a two-way contract with the New Orleans Pelicans. He was later waived on September 24.

On March 14, 2023, Brockington was acquired by the Birmingham Squadron of the NBA G League. He appeared in two games to finish the 2022–23 season.

Brockington played for the New Orleans Pelicans during the 2023 NBA Summer League. On October 16, 2023, he signed with the Pelicans, but was waived six days later. He subsequently re-joined the Birmingham Squadron for the 2023–24 NBA G League season.

On March 3, 2024, Brockington signed a 10-day contract with the Pelicans. On March 5, he made his NBA debut, playing three minutes against the Toronto Raptors. It marked his only NBA game. He was assigned twice to Birmingham during his ten days with the Pelicans. On March 14, he returned to Birmingham permanently.

Brockington played for the New Orleans Pelicans during the 2024 NBA Summer League. He signed with the Pelicans once again on September 24, 2024, but was waived on October 1. He subsequently re-joined the Squadron for the 2024–25 NBA G League season.

=== San Diego Clippers (2025) ===
On March 4, 2025, Brockington was traded to the San Diego Clippers.

=== Vancouver Bandits (2025) ===
On April 4, 2025, Brockington signed with the Vancouver Bandits of the Canadian Elite Basketball League.

Brockington joined the Los Angeles Clippers for the 2025 NBA Summer League.

=== New Zealand Breakers (2025–2026) ===
On July 28, 2025, Brockington signed with the New Zealand Breakers of the Australian National Basketball League (NBL) for the 2025–26 season. The Breakers finished outside the finals spots in seventh at the end of the regular season but won the inaugural NBL Ignite Cup Final, defeating the Adelaide 36ers 111–107 behind Brockington's 21 points.

=== Scaligera Basket Verona (2026–present) ===
On July 24, 2026, he signed with Scaligera Basket Verona of the Italian Lega Basket Serie A (LBA).

== National team ==
Brockington played for the United States men's national basketball team during the 2027 FIBA Basketball World Cup Americas qualifiers.

== Career statistics ==
Legend
GP	Games played	GS	Games started	MPG	Minutes per game
FG%	Field goal percentage	3P%	3-point field goal percentage	FT%	Free throw percentage
RPG	Rebounds per game	APG	Assists per game	SPG	Steals per game
BPG	Blocks per game	PPG	Points per game	**Bold**	Career high

=== NBA ===
Year	Team	GP	GS	MPG	FG%	3P%	FT%	RPG	APG	SPG	BPG	PPG
2023–24	New Orleans	1	0	3.4	.400	.000	—	2.0	.0	.0	.0	4.0
Career		1	0	3.4	.400	.000	—	2.0	.0	.0	.0	4.0

=== College ===
Year	Team	GP	GS	MPG	FG%	3P%	FT%	RPG	APG	SPG	BPG	PPG
2017–18	St. Bonaventure	34	1	11.6	.441	**.415**	.538	1.2	.9	.4	.1	4.3
2018–19	Penn State	Redshirt										
2019–20	Penn State	31	0	20.8	.445	.267	.703	2.7	1.1	.8	.1	8.1
2020–21	Penn State	25	24	29.7	.430	.279	**.841**	4.9	**1.7**	1.0	.2	12.6
2021–22	Iowa State	**35**	**35**	**34.6**	**.447**	.362	.775	**6.8**	1.6	**1.3**	**.3**	**16.9**
Career		125	60	23.9	.442	.340	.748	3.9	1.3	.9	.2	10.4

== Personal life ==
Brockington is the son of Jennifer St. Jean and Antoine Brockington. His father was named Mid-Eastern Athletic Conference Player of the Year for 1997–98 during his college basketball career at Coppin State, before playing professionally overseas. Brockington earned an undergraduate degree from Penn State in labor and employment relations and worked toward a master's degree in family financial planning at Iowa State.
