= Tyson Walker =

American basketball player (born 2000)

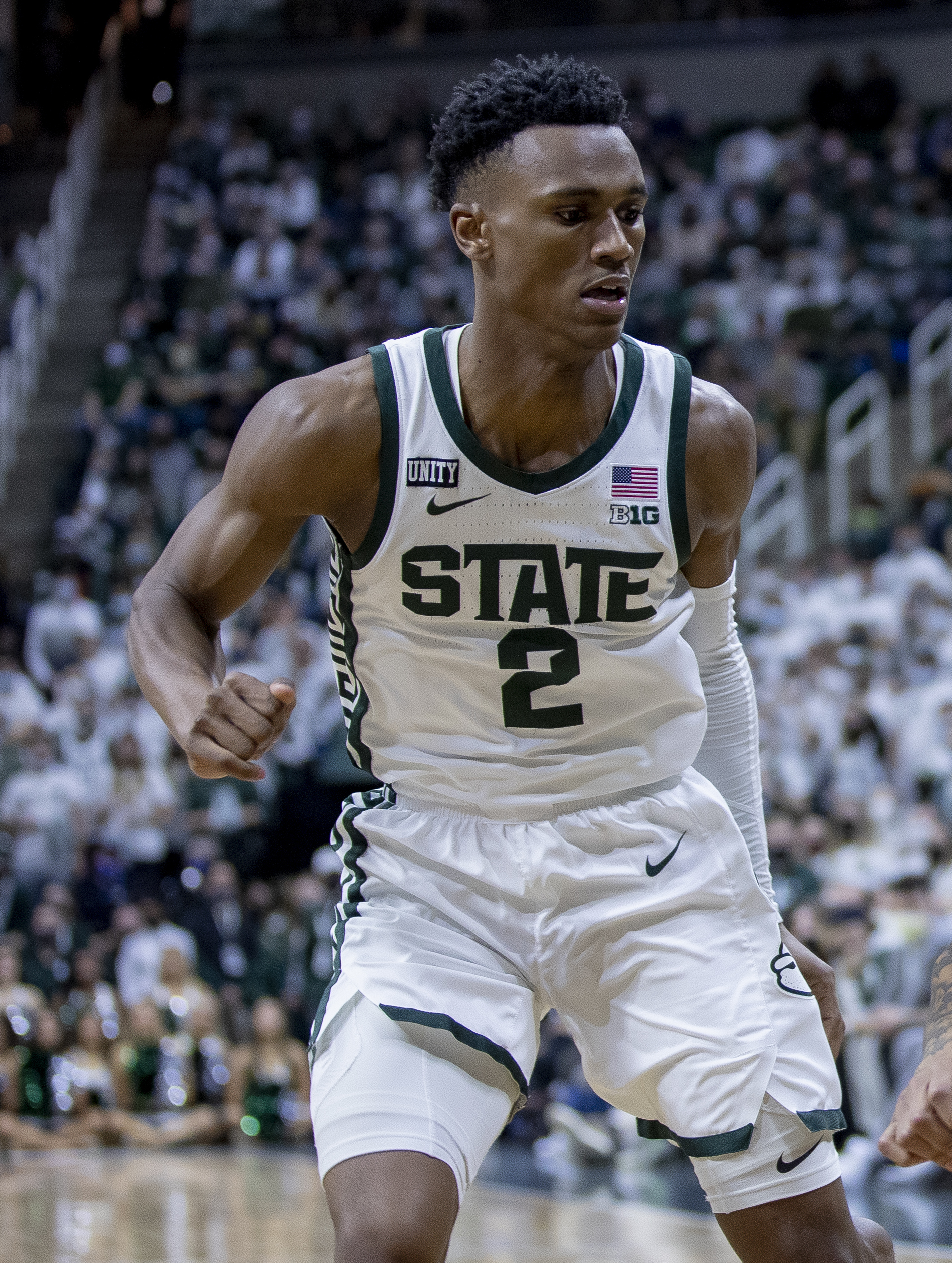
- Walker with Michigan State in 2022

No. 12 – JL Bourg
- Position: Point guard
- League: LNB Élite; EuroCup

Personal information
- Born: September 18, 2000 (age 26)
- Listed height: 6 ft 1 in (1.85 m)
- Listed weight: 185 lb (84 kg)

Career information
- High school: Christ the King (Queens, New York); New Hampton School (New Hampton, New Hampshire)
- College: Northeastern (2019–2021); Michigan State (2021–2024)
- NBA draft: 2024: undrafted
- Playing career: 2024–present

Career history
- 2024–2025: Texas Legends
- 2025–2026: Melbourne United
- 2026–present: JL Bourg

Career highlights
- 2× Second-team All-Big Ten (2023, 2024); First-team All-CAA (2021); CAA Defensive Player of the Year (2021); CAA All-Rookie Team (2020)

Tyson Isiah Walker (born September 18, 2000) is an American professional basketball player for JL Bourg of the LNB Pro A and the EuroCup. He played college basketball for the Northeastern Huskies and Michigan State Spartans.

== High school career ==
Walker played basketball for Christ the King Regional High School in Queens, New York. As a senior, he led his team to a 22–5 record. Walker played a postgraduate season at New Hampton School in New Hampton, New Hampshire. He was considered a three-star recruit by 247Sports and Rivals.

== College career ==
=== Northeastern ===
In his freshman season at Northeastern, Walker shared the backcourt with Jordan Roland. On January 2, 2020, he scored a season-high 32 points in a 77–68 win over Elon. As a freshman, Walker averaged 10.4 points, 3.4 assists and 1.8 steals per game, earning Colonial Athletic Association (CAA) All-Rookie Team honors. He was named CAA Rookie of the Week four times. On February 13, 2021, Walker scored a sophomore season-high 36 points in a 76–67 win over Towson. He averaged 18.8 points, 4.8 assists, and 2.4 steals per game as a sophomore, earning First Team All-CAA and Defensive Player of the Year recognition. Walker led the CAA in scoring during conference play and in steals. After his sophomore season, Walker transferred to Michigan State. He chose the Spartans over Maryland, Kansas, Texas, Miami (Florida) and Vanderbilt.

=== Michigan State ===
During his junior season, Walker split time at point guard with A. J. Hoggard, though Walker was the better shooter of the two. On December 8, 2021, he scored 15 points and had five rebounds and three assists in a 76–67 win against Minnesota. On February 26, 2022 against Purdue, he hit a go-ahead three pointer with 1.4 seconds left to give Michigan State a 68–65 lead. They would end up holding on and winning the game. Walker averaged 8.2 points and 4.3 assists per game, shooting 47.3 percent from three-point range. As a senior, Walker averaged 14.8 points and 2.8 assists per game, earning second-team All-Big Ten honors. He opted to return for his fifth season of eligibility. On March 8, 2024, Walker hit the 2,000-point milestone in a 53–49 win over Northwestern. He averaged 18.4 points, 2.8 assists, 2.9 rebounds and 1.9 steals per game, earning All-Big Ten Second Team honors.

== Professional career ==
After going undrafted in the 2024 NBA draft, Walker joined the Phoenix Suns for the 2024 NBA Summer League. He joined the Texas Legends of the NBA G League for the 2024–25 season after being selected in the G League draft. In 25 games for the Legends, he averaged 14.3 points, 2.7 rebounds, 5.6 assists and 1.1 steals per game.

On June 30, 2025, Walker signed with Melbourne United of the Australian National Basketball League (NBL) for the 2025–26 season. On October 17, 2025, he recorded eight steals in a 95–86 win over the Brisbane Bullets, setting a new United club steals record. On October 26, 2025, he hit the game-winning three-pointer with three seconds remaining in an 81–80 win over the Adelaide 36ers. On February 15, 2026, he scored 30 points in a 100–91 loss to the Illawarra Hawks. In 34 games, he averaged 14.3 points, 2.8 rebounds, 4.4 assists and 1.7 steals per game.

On May 30, 2026, Walker signed with JL Bourg of the French LNB Pro A for the 2026–27 season.

== Career statistics ==
Legend
GP	Games played	GS	Games started	MPG	Minutes per game
FG%	Field goal percentage	3P%	3-point field goal percentage	FT%	Free throw percentage
RPG	Rebounds per game	APG	Assists per game	SPG	Steals per game
BPG	Blocks per game	PPG	Points per game	**Bold**	Career high

=== College ===
Year	Team	GP	GS	MPG	FG%	3P%	FT%	RPG	APG	SPG	BPG	PPG
2019–20	Northeastern	31	29	30.4	.448	.350	.656	2.0	3.3	1.8	**0.2**	10.4
2020–21	Northeastern	19	19	**34.8**	.444	.354	.772	**2.9**	**4.8**	**2.4**	0.1	**18.8**
2021–22	Michigan State	**36**	28	22.6	.427	**.473**	**.810**	1.3	4.3	0.9	0.1	8.2
2022–23	Michigan State	34	**34**	33.9	**.459**	.415	.797	2.5	2.9	1.1	0.2	14.8
2023–24	Michigan State	34	**34**	33.0	.449	.376	.746	**2.9**	2.8	1.9	0.1	18.4
Career		154	144	30.5	.447	.389	.756	2.3	3.5	1.5	0.1	13.7
