= Tim Soares =

American-Brazilian basketball player (born 1997)

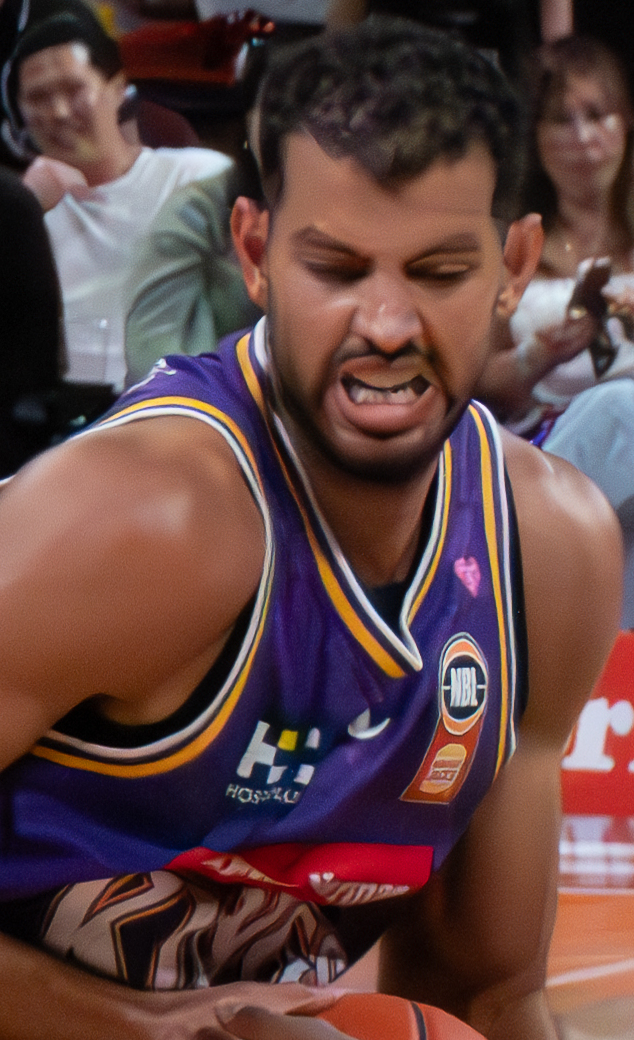
- Soares with the Sydney Kings in 2025

No. 11 – Ibaraki Robots
- Position: Center
- League: B.League

Personal information
- Born: February 4, 1997 (age 29) Deming, Washington, U.S.
- Listed height: 2.11 m (6 ft 11 in)
- Listed weight: 107 kg (236 lb)

Career information
- High school: Mount Baker (Deming, Washington)
- College: The Master's (2016–2020)
- NBA draft: 2020: undrafted
- Playing career: 2020–present

Career history
- 2020–2021: Samsunspor
- 2021–2022: Ironi Ness Ziona
- 2022–2023: Sydney Kings
- 2023: Grises de Humacao
- 2023: Mets de Guaynabo
- 2023–2024: Nagoya Diamond Dolphins
- 2024–2025: Koshigaya Alphas
- 2025–2026: Sydney Kings
- 2026: Capitanes de Arecibo
- 2026–present: Ibaraki Robots

Career highlights
- 2× NBL champion (2023, 2026); Second-team NAIA All-American (2020); Third-team NAIA All-American (2018); Honorable mention NAIA All-American (2019); 3× All-GSAC (2018–2020); 3× GSAC Defensive Player of the Year (2018–2020)

Timothy Luiz Soares (born February 4, 1997) is an American-Brazilian professional basketball player for the Ibaraki Robots of the Japanese B.League. He played college basketball for The Master's Mustangs before playing professionally in Turkey, Israel, Australia, Puerto Rico and Japan.

== Early life ==
Soares was raised in Sao Paulo, Brazil.

== High school career ==
Soares attended Mount Baker High School in Deming, Washington. Playing for the basketball team, in his senior year in 2015–16, he averaged 16.6 points and 11.3 rebounds per game, and was named All-Northwest Conference, despite playing with a bone chip in his shoulder.

== College career ==
Soares attended The Master's University in Santa Clarita, California, and played for The Master's Mustangs. As a freshman center in 2016–17, he averaged just over eight points a game.

As a sophomore in 2017–18, Soares averaged 14.3 points and 8.4 rebounds per game, which was 3rd in the Golden State Athletic Conference (GSAC). He led the conference and was 3rd in the nation with 90 blocks. He was named All-GSAC, the GSAC Defensive Player of the Year, and Third Team National Association of Intercollegiate Athletics (NAIA) All-American.

As a junior in 2018–19, Soares averaged just under 15.8 points per game, and 8.8 rebounds (3rd in the GSAC) per game, with a conference-leading 69 blocks (2.1 per game; 8th in the nation), a field goal percentage of 58.8 (6th in the GSAC), and a free throw percentage of 83.2 (3rd in the GSAC). Soares was named All-GSAC and GSAC Defensive Player of the Year for the second year in a row, and was an NAIA Division 1 Honorable Mention All-American.

As a senior in 2019–20, Soares averaged 18.7 points per game (5th in the GSAC), 8.4 rebounds per game (3rd in the GSAC), and led the GSAC for the third consecutive season in blocks, with 62 (5th in the NAIA; 2.2 blocks per game), along with a 56.8% field goal percentage (4th). He was named All-GSAC, GSAC Defensive Player of the Year, and NAIA Division I All-American Second-Team for the third straight season.

== Professional career ==
Soares signed his first professional contract with Samsunspor in the Turkish Basketball First League for the 2020–21 season. He averaged 14.1 points and 9.5 rebounds (5th in the league) per game.

In July 2021, Soares signed with Ironi Ness Ziona of the Israeli Basketball Premier League. He averaged 14 points and six rebounds per game during the 2021–22 season.

For the 2022 NBA Summer League, Soares played for the Milwaukee Bucks.

On July 29, 2022, Soares signed with the Sydney Kings in Australia for the 2022–23 NBL season. Following the NBL season, he moved to the Puerto Rican BSN, where he played five games for Grises de Humacao and 19 games for Mets de Guaynabo.

For the 2023–24 season, Soares joined the Nagoya Diamond Dolphins of the Japanese B.League. He returned to the B.League for the 2024–25 season, joining the Koshigaya Alphas.

On July 2, 2025, Soares signed with the Sydney Kings for the 2025–26 NBL season, returning to the team for a second stint. He helped the Kings win the championship and averaged 11.4 points, 5.8 rebounds and 1.4 assists per game. He joined Capitanes de Arecibo for the 2026 BSN season.

After the BSN era, Soares joined the Ibaraki Robots. For him, this marks a return to playing in Japanese B.League after two years.

== National team ==
Soares debuted for the Brazilian national team during the 2023 FIBA Basketball World Cup Americas qualifiers. He then played for Brazil at the 2023 FIBA Basketball World Cup.

== Personal life ==
Soares is the son of Rogerio (6' 8") and Susan Soares (6' 4"), who were Christian missionaries, and his siblings are Jessica, Stephanie (6' 6"; 2020 NAIA Division I player of the year), Tiago, and Rebecca. His father played for The Master's University men's basketball from 1992 to 1995, and his mother was the national Gatorade Basketball Player of the Year as a high school senior in 1986, and then played at the University of Texas.
