= Bryce Hamilton =

American basketball player (born 2000)

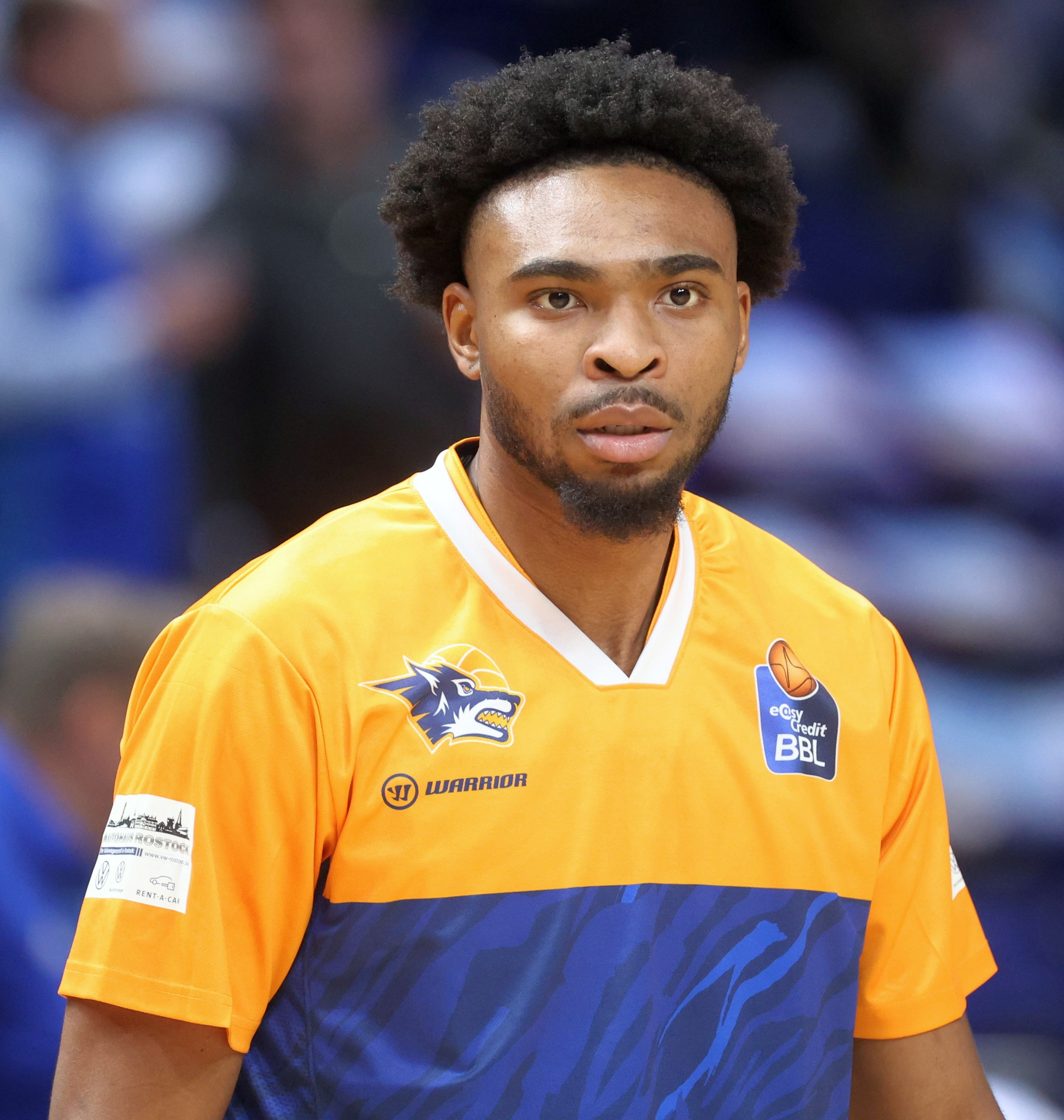
- Hamilton with Rostock Seawolves in 2024

No. 0 – Tasmania JackJumpers
- Position: Shooting guard
- League: NBL

Personal information
- Born: November 10, 2000 (age 26) Pasadena, California, U.S.
- Listed height: 6 ft 4 in (1.93 m)
- Listed weight: 205 lb (93 kg)

Career information
- High school: Pasadena (Pasadena, California)
- College: UNLV (2018–2022)
- NBA draft: 2022: undrafted
- Playing career: 2022–present

Career history
- 2022–2024: South Bay Lakers
- 2024: Promitheas Patras
- 2024–2025: Rostock Seawolves
- 2025–present: Tasmania JackJumpers

Career highlights
- All-NBL Second Team (2026); 2x First-team All-Mountain West (2020, 2022); Second-team All-Mountain West (2021)
- Stats at NBA.com
- Stats at Basketball Reference

Bryce Evan Hamilton (born November 10, 2000) is an American professional basketball player for the Tasmania JackJumpers of the Australian National Basketball League (NBL). He played college basketball for the UNLV Runnin' Rebels of the Mountain West Conference (MWC).

== Early life ==
Hamilton grew up playing football for the Pasadena Trojans Pop Warner program but stopped in eighth grade when he thought it was getting too physical and he had a growth spurt. He played basketball for Pasadena High School in Pasadena, California. As a junior, Hamilton averaged 24.6 points and 8.2 rebounds per game and was named Pasadena Star-News All-Area Player of the Year. In his senior season, he averaged 24.4 points and 7.2 rebounds per game, repeating as Pasadena Star-News All-Area Player of the Year. He was a McDonald's All American nominee. Hamilton was a four-star recruit and committed to play college basketball for UNLV over offers from Nevada, Ohio State, Utah, Arizona State and Colorado.

== College career ==
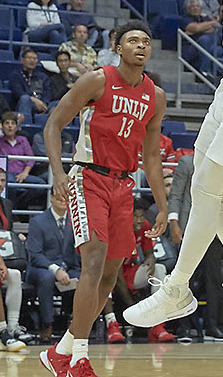
Hamilton with UNLV in 2019

As a freshman at UNLV, Hamilton averaged 4.3 points per game, shooting 35.3 percent from the field. After the season, coach Marvin Menzies was fired and Hamilton entered the NCAA transfer portal. He opted to return to UNLV following a conversation with new coach T. J. Otzelberger. Hamilton had breakout success during conference play in his sophomore season. On January 18, 2020, he scored a season-high 35 points in a 99–78 win over New Mexico. On January 26, Hamilton recorded 29 points and 10 rebounds in a 71–67 loss to fourth-ranked San Diego State. He was named to the First Team All-Mountain West after averaging 16 points and 5.5 rebounds per game as a sophomore. As a junior, Hamilton averaged 17.9 points and 6 rebounds per game, earning Second Team All-Mountain West honors. Following the season, he entered the transfer portal, but ultimately returned to UNLV. On January 28, 2022, Hamilton scored a career-high 45 points in an 88–74 win over Colorado State. He was named to the First Team All-Mountain West as a senior. On March 28, 2022, Hamilton declared for the 2022 NBA draft, forgoing his remaining college eligibility.

== Professional career ==
=== South Bay Lakers (2022–2024) ===
After going undrafted in the 2022 NBA draft, Hamilton joined the Miami Heat for the 2022 NBA Summer League. On October 10, 2022, Hamilton signed with the Los Angeles Lakers, but he was waived the next day. He subsequently joined the South Bay Lakers of the NBA G League for the 2022–23 season. In 45 games, he averaged 14.8 points, 4.6 rebounds and 2.1 assists per game.

Hamilton joined the Los Angeles Lakers for the 2023 NBA Summer League and later signed an Exhibit 10 contract with the Lakers on September 7. He was waived on September 18 and subsequently re-joined the South Bay Lakers for the 2023–24 NBA G League season. In 48 games, he averaged 16.6 points, 3.7 rebounds, 1.9 assists and 1.2 steals per game.

=== Promitheas Patras (2024) ===
On April 4, 2024, Hamilton signed with Promitheas Patras of the Greek Basket League for the rest of the 2023–24 season. In eight games, he averaged 12.1 points, 4.0 rebounds, 1.5 assists and 1.9 steals per game.

=== Rostock Seawolves (2024–2025) ===
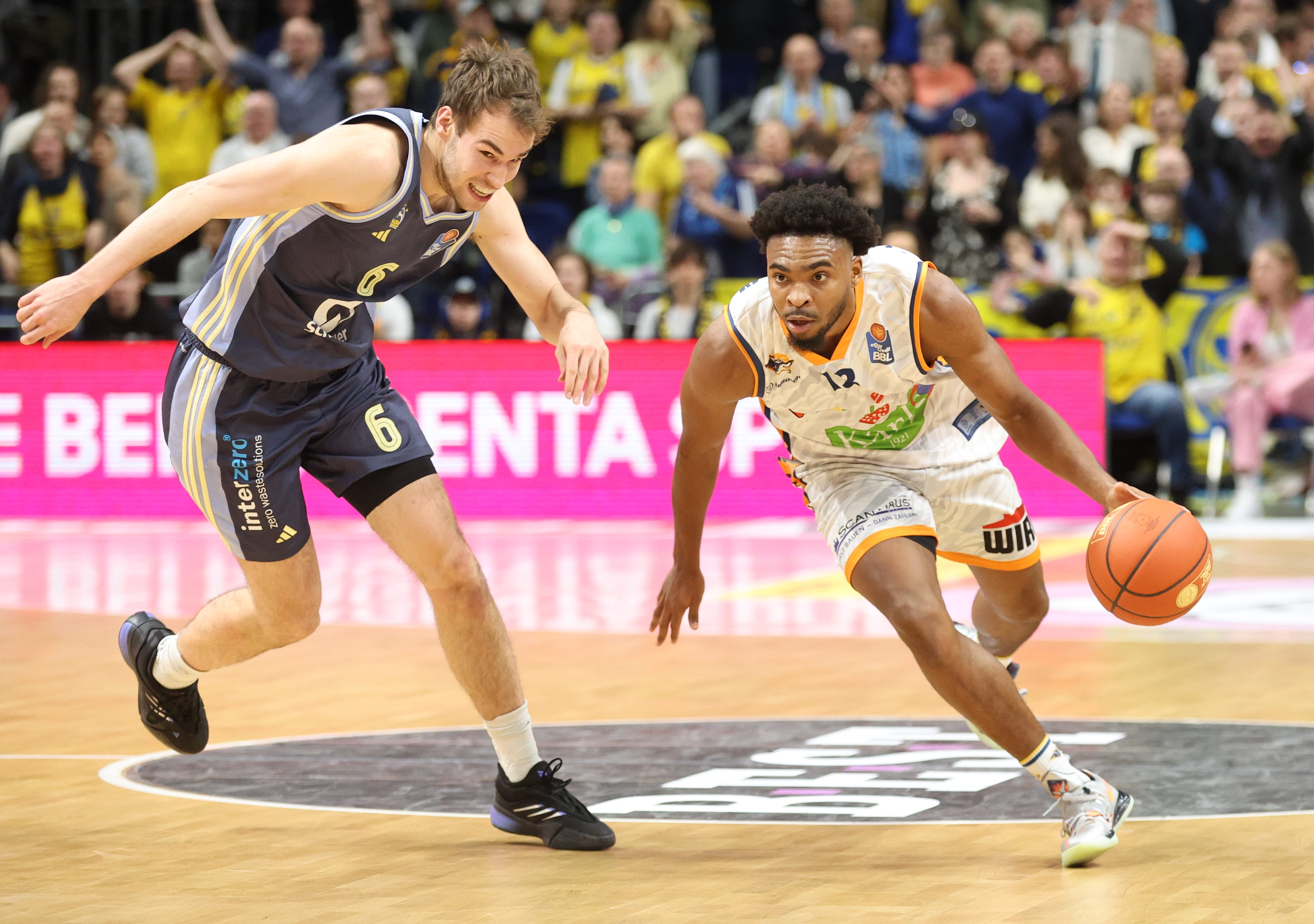
Hamilton drives past Malte Delow in 2024

On July 12, 2024, Hamilton signed with Rostock Seawolves of the Basketball Bundesliga (BBL) for the 2024–25 season. In 33 games, he averaged 17.8 points, 4.2 rebounds and 2.3 assists per game.

=== Tasmania JackJumpers (2025–present) ===
On June 26, 2025, Hamilton signed with the Tasmania JackJumpers of the Australian National Basketball League (NBL) for the 2025–26 season. On January 24, 2026, he was ruled out for the rest of the season due to an ACL injury. He had been in the mix for All-NBL First Team honours, averaging 18.2 points on 47 per cent shooting. He was ultimately named in the All-NBL Second Team.

On July 6, 2026, Hamilton re-signed with the JackJumpers on a two-year deal. He missed the start of the 2026–27 NBL season due to still recovering from ACL surgery.

== Career statistics ==
Legend
GP	Games played	GS	Games started	MPG	Minutes per game
FG%	Field goal percentage	3P%	3-point field goal percentage	FT%	Free throw percentage
RPG	Rebounds per game	APG	Assists per game	SPG	Steals per game
BPG	Blocks per game	PPG	Points per game	**Bold**	Career high

=== College ===
Year	Team	GP	GS	MPG	FG%	3P%	FT%	RPG	APG	SPG	BPG	PPG
2018–19	UNLV	31	0	13.0	.353	.296	.630	1.6	.6	.3	**.2**	4.3
2019–20	UNLV	**32**	14	27.2	**.453**	.339	.679	5.5	1.4	.7	**.2**	16.0
2020–21	UNLV	24	24	**32.6**	.430	.313	.656	**6.0**	**3.0**	**1.3**	.1	17.9
2021–22	UNLV	**32**	**31**	32.3	.430	**.346**	**.768**	5.0	2.2	.8	.1	**21.8**
Career		119	69	26.0	.429	.331	.710	4.4	1.7	.8	.1	14.9

== Personal life ==
Hamilton's older brother, Blake, played college basketball for Buffalo before embarking on a professional career. Three of his cousins, Daniel, Isaac and Jordan, play professionally; Daniel and Jordan were drafted into the NBA.
