= Tyger Campbell =

American basketball player (born 2000)

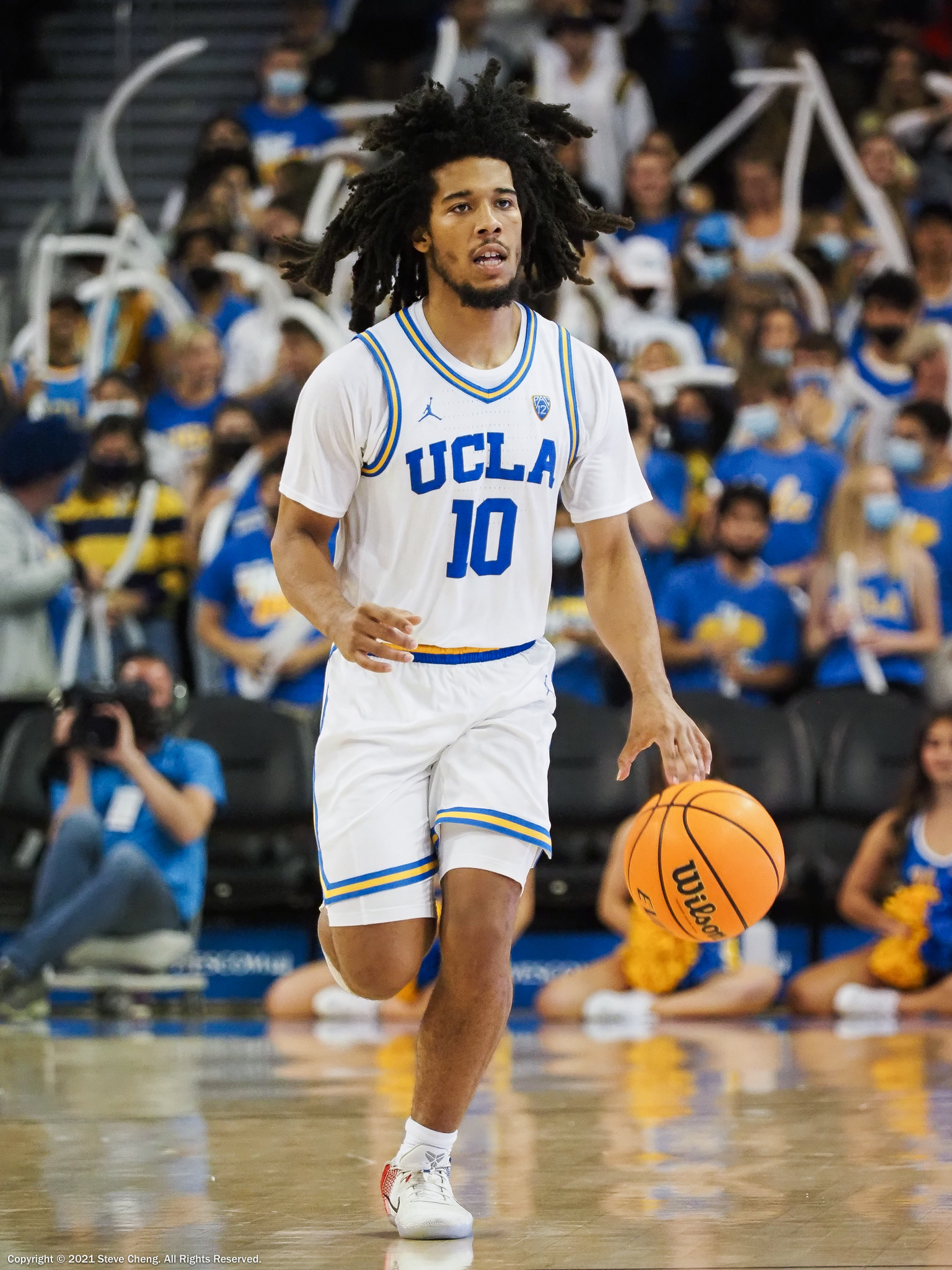
- Campbell with UCLA in 2021

No. 10 – JL Bourg
- Position: Point guard
- League: LNB Élite; EuroCup

Personal information
- Born: January 9, 2000 (age 26) Cedar Rapids, Iowa, U.S.
- Listed height: 5 ft 11 in (1.80 m)
- Listed weight: 180 lb (82 kg)

Career information
- High school: La Lumiere School (La Porte, Indiana)
- College: UCLA (2019–2023)
- NBA draft: 2023: undrafted
- Playing career: 2023–present

Career history
- 2023–2024: Saint-Quentin
- 2024–2025: Rasta Vechta
- 2025–2026: Tasmania JackJumpers
- 2026: Skyliners Frankfurt
- 2026–present: JL Bourg Basket

Career highlights
- 3× First-team All-Pac-12 (2021–2023)

Tyger Campbell (born January 9, 2000) is an American professional basketball player for JL Bourg Basket of the LNB Pro A and the EuroCup. He played college basketball for the UCLA Bruins of the Pac-12 Conference, and earned first-team All-Pac-12 honors three times.

== High school career ==
Campbell is the son of Jennifer and Tony Campbell, who played basketball at Luther College. They named their son after Tiger Woods. Campbell grew up in Cedar Rapids, Iowa. He attended La Lumiere School in La Porte, Indiana, which he credits for his "entry into manhood", adding, "it’s a place where you can learn how to be a good teammate." In his sophomore season, he led La Lumiere to the Dick's Sporting Goods championship and a 29–1 record while averaging 11.3 points and 7.8 assists per game. Following his sophomore season, Campbell reclassified to the class of 2018 because he was ahead academically and felt he was ready for college basketball. As a senior, Campbell averaged 15.5 points and 7.2 assists per game.

Campbell initially committed to DePaul on May 8, 2017, but he withdrew his commitment in September. In February 2018, he signed with UCLA.

== College career ==
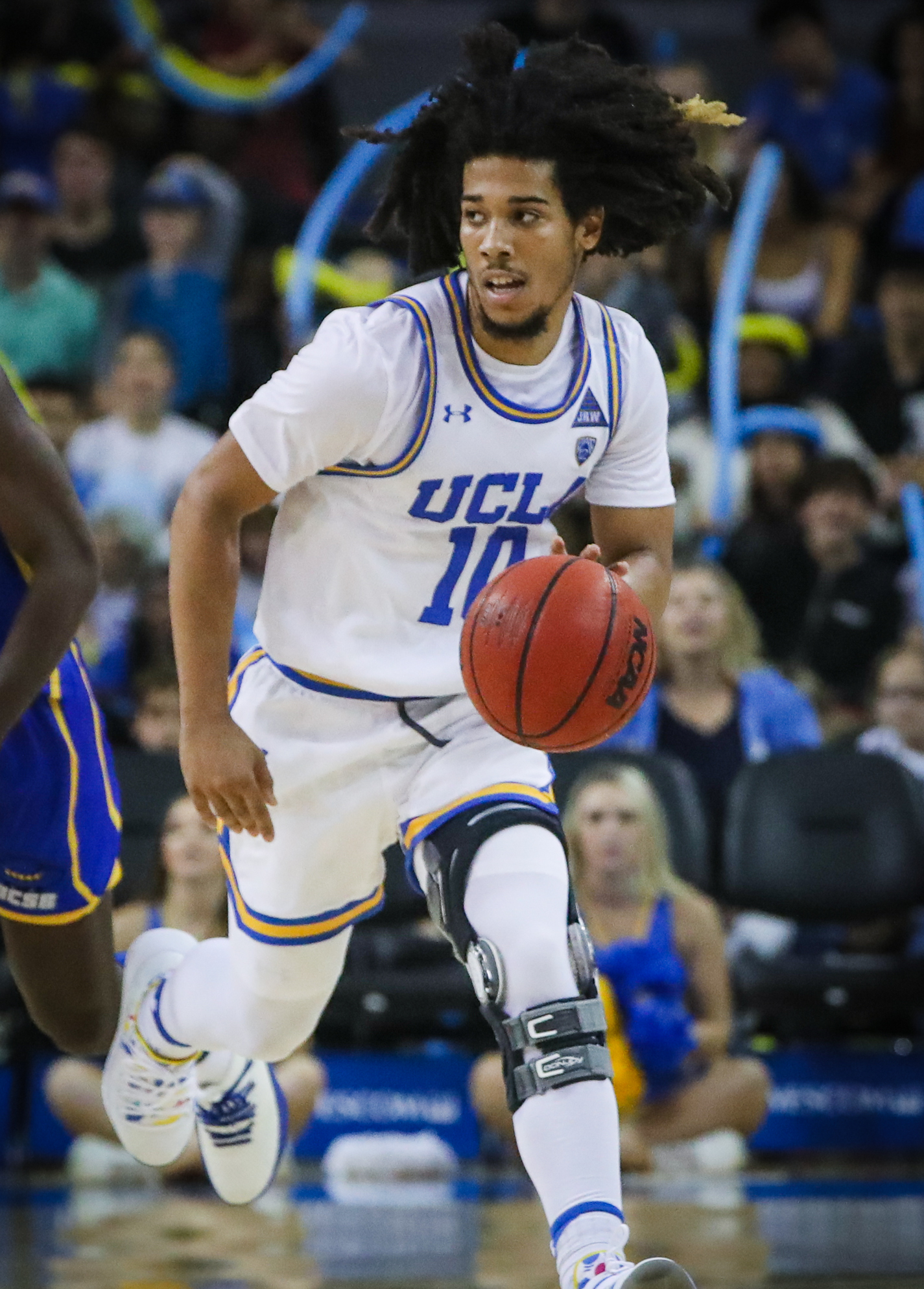
Campbell with UCLA in 2019

During a practice before the start of his freshman season, Campbell suffered a knee injury. An MRI revealed it was a torn ACL, and he was forced to sit out the season in which the Bruins finished 17–16. He was cleared to play in September 2019 but was forced to wear a knee brace for a few months. In his collegiate debut on November 9, Campbell scored 15 points in a 69–65 win over Long Beach State. On February 3, 2020, Campbell scored a season-high 22 points in a win over Utah. This performance was a part of a three-game run in which Campbell averaged 15.7 points per game, which he credited to coach Mick Cronin urging him to be more aggressive offensively. After posting his first double-double of 15 points and 11 assists in a 70–63 win over Colorado, Campbell was named Pac-12 freshman of the week on February 24. As a redshirt freshman, Campbell averaged 8.3 points and 5.0 assists per game.

In 2020–21, Campbell scored 22 points in a road win against Arizona for UCLA's fourth straight win on their rivals' court. Among the conference leaders in both assists and assist-turnover ratio, he was a first-team All-Pac-12 selection. Campbell averaged 10.4 points and 5.4 assists per game as a sophomore, shooting 42.9 percent from the field.

In 2021–22, Campbell was named the Pac-12 Player of the Week for the week ending January 9, 2022. He led UCLA to a 2–0 record while averaging 14 points along with seven assists per game and shooting 61 percent, including 5-of-8 on his three-point field goals. He had worked on his 3-point shooting over the summer after making just 25.9% of his shots in his first two seasons. On February 13, he scored a career-high 27 points in a 67–64 loss to USC. He was named again to the All-Pac-12 first team. He was also one of five finalists for the Bob Cousy Award, given to the top point guard in the country. In the opener of the 2022 NCAA tournament, Campbell scored a team-high 16 points, including eight of the Bruins' final 10 points, in a 57–53 comeback win over 13th-seeded Akron.

As a senior in 2022–23, Campbell was named to the 10-player midseason watch list for the Cousy Award. He earned his third consecutive first-team All-Pac-12 selection, and received honorable mention as an All-American from the Associated Press. In the semifinals of the Pac-12 tournament, he scored 20 of his career-high 28 points in the second half in a win over Oregon. UCLA advanced to the Sweet Sixteen of the 2023 NCAA tournament. After the season, he declared for the 2023 NBA draft, forgoing the extra year of eligibility granted due to the COVID-19 pandemic. Campbell ended his career ranked second in Bruins' history in career assists (655) behind Pooh Richardson (833). He had just 217 turnovers for a 3.02-to-1 assist-to-turnover ratio. He started all 133 of his games and averaged 11.1 points, 4.9 assists, and 1.1 steals.

== Professional career ==
After going undrafted in the 2023 NBA draft, Campbell joined the Orlando Magic for the 2023 NBA Summer League. On August 3, 2023, he signed with Saint-Quentin Basket-Ball of the French LNB Pro A.

On July 10, 2024, Campbell signed with Rasta Vechta of the German Basketball Bundesliga (BBL).

On August 6, 2025, Campbell signed with the Tasmania JackJumpers of the Australian National Basketball League (NBL) for the 2025–26 season as an injury replacement player for Sean Macdonald.

On March 28, 2026, the Skyliners Frankfurt announced the signing of Tyger Campbell for their roster in the German Basketball Bundesliga (BBL).

On October 6, 2026, he signed with JL Bourg of the LNB Pro A.

== Career statistics ==
Legend
GP	Games played	GS	Games started	MPG	Minutes per game
FG%	Field goal percentage	3P%	3-point field goal percentage	FT%	Free throw percentage
RPG	Rebounds per game	APG	Assists per game	SPG	Steals per game
BPG	Blocks per game	PPG	Points per game	**Bold**	Career high

=== College ===
Year	Team	GP	GS	MPG	FG%	3P%	FT%	RPG	APG	SPG	BPG	PPG
2018–19	UCLA	Redshirt										
2019–20	UCLA	31	31	30.0	.358	.267	.674	2.4	5.0	.8	.0	8.3
2020–21	UCLA	32	32	**33.7**	.429	.250	.772	2.1	**5.4**	1.1	.0	10.4
2021–22	UCLA	33	33	32.4	**.444**	**.410**	.838	2.5	4.3	1.0	**.1**	11.9
2022–23	UCLA	**37**	**37**	32.0	.378	.338	**.856**	**2.6**	5.0	**1.2**	.0	**13.4**
Career		133	133	32.0	.402	.329	.791	2.4	4.9	1.1	.0	11.1
