= Jacob Holt (basketball) =

Canadian-Australian basketball player (born 2003)

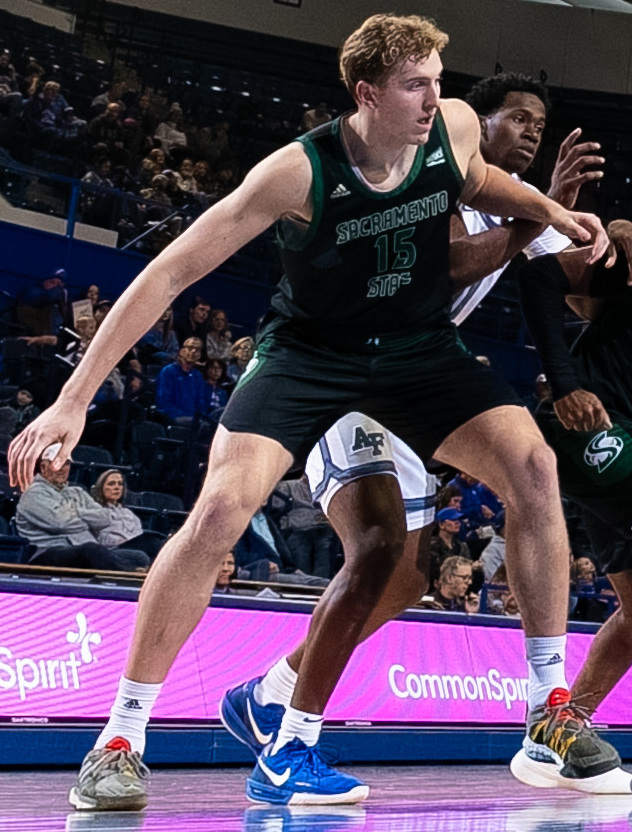
- Holt with Sacramento State in 2024

No. 15 – Brisbane Bullets
- Position: Power forward
- League: NBL

Personal information
- Born: June 21, 2003 (age 23)
- Listed height: 208 cm (6 ft 10 in)
- Listed weight: 113 kg (249 lb)

Career information
- High school: Vancouver College (Vancouver, British Columbia)
- College: Santa Clara (2021–2023); Sacramento State (2023–2025)
- NBA draft: 2025: undrafted
- Playing career: 2025–present

Career history
- 2025–present: Brisbane Bullets
- 2026: Skyliners Frankfurt

Career highlights
- Second-team All-Big Sky (2025)

Jacob Holt (born June 21, 2003) is a Canadian-Australian professional basketball player for the Brisbane Bullets of the Australian National Basketball League (NBL). He played college basketball for the Santa Clara Broncos and Sacramento State Hornets.

== Early life ==
Holt grew up in the small farming town of Ladner, in British Columbia, Canada, just south of Vancouver. For high school, he attended Vancouver College. During the 2020 4A Provincial Tournament, he earned first team all-star accolades after averaging 27.8 points, 12.5 rebounds and 4.8 blocks per game in the event.

== College career ==
As a freshman at Santa Clara in 2021–22, Holt played sparingly in 21 games with an average of 5.5 minutes per contest, finishing the season with 1.7 points and 1.8 rebounds per game while shooting 48.3 percent from the floor. He sat out the first nine games due to injury. He scored a season-high seven points with six rebounds in the 2022 WCC Tournament against Saint Mary's on March 7.

As a sophomore in 2022–23, Holt played in 29 games off the bench for the Broncos and averaged 2.6 points per game on 40.3 percent shooting. He scored a career-high 12 points against Iona on November 26, 2022.

In April 2023, Holt transferred to Sacramento State.

As a junior in 2023–24, Holt was one of five Hornets to play in all 34 games, including six starts, averaging 6.7 points and 4.6 rebounds in 16.3 minutes per game. He scored in double figures 10 times, including a season-high 15 points against Portland State.

As a senior in 2024–25, Holt was the only Hornet to start all 32 games and led the team in points (16.3 ppg), rebounds (6.9 rpg) and blocked shots (0.8 bpg). He also shot 50% (174–345) from the field, 35% (39–112) from the 3-point line, and 72% (135–188) from the free throw line. He led the team in scoring on 21 occasions, including six of the final seven games of the season, with 24 double-figure scoring games. He posted six double-doubles, scored 20+ points on 11 occasions, and 30+ points on two occasions. He scored a career-high 35 points to go with 10 rebounds against Idaho on January 9, 2025. He was subsequently named second-team All-Big Sky.

== Professional career ==
On May 15, 2025, Holt signed a three-year deal with the Brisbane Bullets of the Australian National Basketball League (NBL). He joined the Bullets as a local player after obtaining Australian citizenship. Following off-season hip surgery, Holt missed the first 11 games of the 2025–26 season, making his debut for the Bullets against the Tasmania JackJumpers on November 8. After serving as a back-up to Tyrell Harrison initially, following an injury to Harrison on New Year's Day, Holt's role, minutes and production expanded. In the New Year's Day game against the Perth Wildcats, Holt scored an equal game-high 17 points in a 95–75 loss. On January 21, 2026, while continuing to start in the absence of Harrison, Holt scored a game-high 23 points in a 98–66 loss to Melbourne United. On January 28, he scored a game-high 24 points in a 107–74 loss to the Adelaide 36ers. In 22 games for the Bullets, he averaged 9.3 points and 5.2 rebounds per game.

On March 3, 2026, Holt signed with Skyliners Frankfurt of the Basketball Bundesliga (BBL) for the rest of the 2025–26 BBL season.

On October 20, 2026, Holt was ruled out for five weeks with an ankle injury. After missing eight games, he returned to action on November 22.

== National team ==
In February 2026, Holt was named in the Australia men's national basketball team for two FIBA World Cup Asian qualifiers. In August 2026, he was named in the squad for two more Asian qualifiers. In November 2026, he was named in the squad for two more Asian qualifiers.

== Personal life ==
Holt's mother is of Australian and Croatian heritage and his father is of Canadian and Dutch heritage. His mother's parents immigrated from Croatia to Australia and she was subsequently born in Sydney. At the time of signing with the Brisbane Bullets in May 2025, his Australian citizenship status was pending. By July 2025, he had obtained his citizenship. As of January 2026, he was in the process of also trying to get his Croatian passport.
