= Flynn Cameron =

New Zealand basketball player

No. 1 – Adelaide 36ers
- Position: Point guard
- League: NBL

Personal information
- Born: 30 June 2000 (age 26) Auckland, New Zealand
- Listed height: 196 cm (6 ft 5 in)
- Listed weight: 90 kg (198 lb)

Career information
- High school: Hillcrest Christian College (Gold Coast, Australia)
- College: DePaul (2018–2020); UC Riverside (2020–2023)
- NBA draft: 2023: undrafted
- Playing career: 2016–present

Career history
- 2016–2017: Gold Coast Rollers
- 2023–2025: Melbourne United
- 2024: Taranaki Airs
- 2025: Franklin Bulls
- 2025–present: Adelaide 36ers
- 2026: South West Metro Pirates

Career highlights
- NBL Most Improved Player (2026); Second-team All-Big West (2023)
Medals
Men's basketball
Representing New Zealand
FIBA Asia Cup
Bronze medal – third place	2022 Jakarta

Flynn Macpherson Cameron (born 30 June 2000) is a New Zealand professional basketball player for the Adelaide 36ers of the Australian National Basketball League (NBL). He played college basketball in the United States for the DePaul Blue Demons and UC Riverside Highlanders from 2018 to 2023. Cameron began his NBL career with Melbourne United in 2023 and joined the 36ers in 2025. He has played for the New Zealand national basketball team.

== Early life ==
Cameron was born in Auckland, New Zealand, in the suburb of Henderson. He aspired to become a basketball player at the age of three. He moved to Australia when he was seven. Cameron was raised in the Gold Coast, Queensland, and played basketball at Hillcrest Christian College.

In 2016 and 2017, Cameron played for the Gold Coast Rollers in the Queensland Basketball League. He also helped Gold Coast Basketball win the state under-18 championship in 2017.

== College career ==
On 21 December 2017, Cameron signed with the DePaul Blue Demons. He did not play during the 2017–18 season. Cameron played as a backup point guard during the 2018–19 season and averaged 1.8 points per game in 28 appearances. His role decreased during the 2019–20 season and he only played in 11 games with an average of 2.3 points per game. On 15 April 2020, Cameron entered the transfer portal.

Cameron joined the UC Riverside Highlanders. He started 86 of his 88 games with the Highlanders. Cameron was selected to the All-Big West Conference second team in 2023.

== Professional career ==
On 11 April 2023, Cameron signed with Melbourne United of the Australian National Basketball League (NBL) on a three-year contract with a mutual option for the third season.

On 30 January 2024, Cameron signed with the Taranaki Airs of the New Zealand National Basketball League (NZNBL) for the 2024 season. He averaged 16 points, 5.3 rebounds and 3.7 assists per game.

On 14 February 2025, Cameron signed with the Franklin Bulls of the NZNBL for the 2025 season. The move partnered him with his brother, Tobias.

On 31 March 2025, Melbourne United announced that they had declined the mutual option on Cameron's contract. On 8 April, Cameron signed with the Adelaide 36ers of the NBL on a three-year contract. On 2 January 2026, he scored a career-high 25 points in a win over the Sydney Kings. Cameron averaged 12.1 points, 4.5 rebounds and 3.2 assists per game during the 2025–26 season for which he was chosen as the NBL Most Improved Player.

On 5 June 2026, Cameron signed with the South West Metro Pirates of the NBL1 North. He played for the Portland Trail Blazers during the 2026 NBA Summer League.

In the 2026–27 NBL season opener, Cameron sustained an ankle injury that ruled him out until mid November.

== National team career ==
Cameron committed to play for New Zealand as a junior in 2016 despite being eligible to play for Australia.

Cameron was selected to play for the New Zealand national basketball team at the 2022 FIBA Asia Cup where he played under his father as head coach. He led the team in points and assists as the team won a bronze medal.

Cameron was selected on the New Zealand squad for the 2023 FIBA World Cup.

Cameron played for New Zealand at the 2025 FIBA Asia Cup. On 10 August 2025 in a game against Chinese Taipei, he scored 28 points which was the most points ever scored by a New Zealander in a FIBA Asia Cup game.

In November 2025, Cameron was named in the Tall Blacks squad for the first window of the FIBA Basketball World Cup 2027 Asian Qualifiers. In August 2026, he was named in the Tall Blacks squad for the next Asian qualifier window. In November 2026, he was named in the squad for two more Asian qualifiers.

== Career statistics ==
Legend
GP	Games played	GS	Games started	MPG	Minutes per game
FG%	Field goal percentage	3P%	3-point field goal percentage	FT%	Free throw percentage
RPG	Rebounds per game	APG	Assists per game	SPG	Steals per game
BPG	Blocks per game	PPG	Points per game	**Bold**	Career high

=== College ===
Year	Team	GP	GS	MPG	FG%	3P%	FT%	RPG	APG	SPG	BPG	PPG
2018–19	DePaul	28	0	9.4	.396	.273	.636	1.1	.8	.4	.0	1.8
2019–20	DePaul	11	0	7.3	**.435**	.300	.333	1.2	.4	.4	.0	2.3
2020–21	UC Riverside	22	21	27.4	.431	.366	.742	**5.4**	2.1	.9	**.3**	8.9
2021–22	UC Riverside	28	27	**30.7**	.402	.348	**.800**	4.1	1.5	.9	.1	10.5
2022–23	UC Riverside	**34**	**34**	29.9	.427	**.409**	.741	**5.4**	**3.5**	**1.2**	.2	**13.6**
Career		123	82	22.9	.419	.372	.737	3.7	1.9	.8	.1	8.3

== Personal life ==
Cameron is the son of New Zealand basketball player Pero Cameron. His older brother, Tobias, is also a basketball player.
