= 2025 NBL pre-season =

Pre-season basketball tournament

2025 NBL Blitz logo

The pre-season of the 2025–26 NBL season, the 48th season of Australia's National Basketball League, it began on 28 June to 5 October 2025.

== Pre-season games ==
=== B.League Global Invitational ===
28 June 2025	B.League United	64–75	NBL Select	OpenHouse Arena Ota, Ōta, Gunma
19:00	Scoring by quarter: 19–21, 13–12, 16–25, 16–17
NBL TV	Pts: Tobin 17; Rebs: Baker 10; Asts: Nakamura 4	boxscore report	Pts: Adnam 14; Rebs: Mitchell, Peatling 9 Asts: McDainel, Peatling 4	Attendance: 3,094

29 June 2025	B.League United	69–78	NBL Select	OpenHouse Arena Ota, Ōta, Gunma
19:00	Scoring by quarter: 24–22, 14–22, 21–17, 10–17
NBL TV	Pts: Imamura 13; Rebs: Baker, Smith 8 Asts: Ikeda 7	boxscore report	Pts: Bannan 23; Rebs: Bannan 19; Asts: Bannan 5	Attendance: 3,063

=== Games ===
18 August 2025	Tasmania JackJumpers	97–101	Sydney Kings	Ulverstone Sports Centre, Ulverstone
18:00	Scoring by quarter: 25–31, 20–27, 32–20, 20–23
NBL TV	Pts: Richards 21; Rebs: Johnson 7 Asts: Campbell 5	boxscore report	Pts: Maluach 18; Rebs: three players 5 Asts: Dellavedova 6	Attendance: n/a

19 August 2025	S.E. Melbourne Phoenix	108–86	Cairns Taipans	State Basketball Centre, Melbourne
18:30	Scoring by quarter: 29–19, 29–20, 25– 26, 25–21
NBL TV	Pts: Mitchell 19; Rebs: Aliir 9 Asts: Maldonado, Sobey 5	boxscore report	Pts: Higgins-Titsha, Stattmann 15; Rebs: Higgins-Titsha 8 Asts: Adnam 5	Attendance: n/a

20 August 2025	Tasmania JackJumpers	79–89	Sydney Kings	Elphin Sports Centre, Launceston
18:00	Scoring by quarter: 25–30, 23–19, 13–21, 18–19
NBL TV	Pts: Hamilton 21; Rebs: Majok, Richards 7 Asts: three players 2	boxscore report	Pts: Davis 25; Rebs: Soares 9 Asts: Dellavedova 4	Attendance: n/a

21 August 2025	Melbourne United	116–91	Cairns Taipans	Casey Stadium, Melbourne
18:30	Scoring by quarter: 41–15, 26–31, 27–30, 22–15
NBL TV	Pts: Doyle 22; Rebs: Krslovic 7 Asts: Krslovic 7	boxscore report	Pts: Galloway 24; Rebs: Higgins-Titsha 10; Asts: Mag 4	Attendance: n/a

23 August 2025	S.E. Melbourne Phoenix	101–107	Melbourne United	State Basketball Centre, Melbourne
18:30	Scoring by quarter: 25–13, 24–27, 26–34, 26–33
NBL TV	Pts: Sobey 21; Rebs: Hunter 8 Asts: Bleijenbergh 9	boxscore report	Pts: Walker 27; Rebs: Krebs 6 Asts: Krebs 8	Attendance: n/a

24 August 2025	Cairns Taipans	84–92	Brisbane Bullets	Trinity Ford Stadium, Cairns
14:00	Scoring by quarter: 16–26, 27–16, 24–27, 17–23
NBL TV	Pts: Stattmann 20; Rebs: Lee 6 Asts: Dennis 4	boxscore report	Pts: Freeman-Liberty 17; Rebs: Harrison 9 Asts: Adams 5	Attendance: n/a

11 September 2025	Adelaide 36ers	99–82	NBL1 South Select	Wulanda Convention Centre, Mount Gambier
19:30	Scoring by quarter: 24–18, 27–28, 25–9, 23–27
NBL TV	Pts: Vasiljevic, White 18; Rebs: Cheatham 9 Asts: Cameron, Harris 3	boxscore report	Pts: Barker 25; Rebs: Lawton 7 Asts: Tata 4	Attendance: n/a

12 September 2025	Brisbane Bullets	90–108	Melbourne United	UniSC Arena, Sunshine Coast
18:30	Scoring by quarter: 14–33, 23–19, 24–25, 29–31
NBL TV	Pts: Prather 17; Rebs: Harrison 7 Asts: Adams 7	boxscore report	Pts: Edwards 17; Rebs: Edwards 10; Asts: Doyle, Walker 6	Attendance: n/a

12 September 2025	S.E. Melbourne Phoenix	90–75	Ryukyu Golden Kings	Perth HPC, Perth
17:00	Scoring by quarter: 26–12, 25–21, 21–16, 18–26
NBL TV	Pts: Foxwell, Maldonado 18; Rebs: Maldonado 7 Asts: Foxwell 5	boxscore report	Pts: Law, Sakihama 11; Rebs: Cooley, Kirk 7 Asts: Law 4	Attendance: n/a

12 September 2025	Perth Wildcats	86–66	Sunrockers Shibuya	Perth HPC, Perth
19:30	Scoring by quarter: 21–19, 28–10, 16–20, 21–17
NBL TV	Pts: Lual-Acuil 22; Rebs: Doolittle 9 Asts: Henshall 6	boxscore report	Pts: Hawkinson 28; Rebs: Welsh 10; Asts: Vendrame 6	Attendance: n/a

12 September 2025	Nagasaki Velca	90–93	New Zealand Breakers	Happiness Arena, Nagasaki
20:00	Scoring by quarter: 22–24, 26–28, 20–17, 22–24
not available	Pts: Johnson 37; Rebs: Brantley 9 Asts: Brantley 4	boxscore report	Pts: Baker 26; Rebs: Baker 11; Asts: Davison 3	Attendance: n/a

13 September 2025	Kumamoto Volters	90–81	New Zealand Breakers	Happiness Arena, Nagasaki
18:00	Scoring by quarter: 15–13, 27–17, 26–27, 22–24
not available		boxscore report		Attendance: n/a

14 September 2025	S.E. Melbourne Phoenix	85–72	Sunrockers Shibuya	Perth HPC, Perth
14:00	Scoring by quarter: 19–19, 30–16, 22–18, 14–19
NBL TV	Pts: Glover 17; Rebs: Maldonado 10; Asts: four players 3	boxscore report	Pts: Hawkinson 19; Rebs: Welsh 10; Asts: Harper 6	Attendance: n/a

14 September 2025	Perth Wildcats	103–93	Ryukyu Golden Kings	Perth HPC, Perth
16:30	Scoring by quarter: 21–27, 31–27, 22–19, 29–20
NBL TV	Pts: Jones 22; Rebs: Windler 8 Asts: Jones 7	boxscore report	Pts: Cooley 24; Rebs: Kirk 10; Asts: Law 5	Attendance: n/a

== NBL Blitz ==
The 2025 NBL Blitz is an annual pre-season tournament featuring all teams. All games will takeplace in Canberra, Australian Capital Territory.

This season all games will be played at AIS Arena from 27 to 31 August 2025. The Blitz coincided with the NBL1 National Finals, which also took place in Canberra at Southern Cross Stadium.

=== Blitz ladder ===
Pos	Team	Pld	W	L	PF	PA	PP	BP	Pts
1	New Zealand Breakers (C)	2	2	0	203	176	115.3	7	13
2	Tasmania JackJumpers	2	2	0	194	190	102.1	3	9
3	Adelaide 36ers	2	1	1	199	180	110.6	5.5	8.5
4	Melbourne United	2	1	1	176	144	122.2	5	8
5	S.E. Melbourne Phoenix	2	1	1	203	190	106.8	4	7
6	Perth Wildcats	2	1	1	176	178	98.9	4	7
7	Brisbane Bullets	2	1	1	160	190	84.2	4	7
8	Illawarra Hawks	2	1	1	183	196	93.4	2.5	5.5
9	Cairns Taipans	2	0	2	170	191	89.0	3	3
10	Sydney Kings	2	0	2	173	202	85.6	2	2

Updated to match(es) played on 31 August 2025. Source: nblblitz.com.au
(C) Champions

=== Blitz games ===
27 August 2025	Perth Wildcats	84–78	Melbourne United	AIS Arena, Canberra
17:30	Scoring by quarter: 23–17, 21–22, 24–29, 16–10
Disney+/Kayo	Pts: Henshall 16; Rebs: Henshall 7 Asts: three players 2	boxscore report	Pts: Doyle 15; Rebs: Edwards 9 Asts: Doyle 3	Attendance: n/a

27 August 2025	Adelaide 36ers	104–83	Illawarra Hawks	AIS Arena, Canberra
20:00	Scoring by quarter: 23–17, 21–21, 31–23, 29–22
Disney+/Kayo	Pts: White 20; Rebs: Cheatham 6 Asts: White 6	boxscore report	Pts: Hickey 14; Rebs: Grida 10; Asts: H.Froling, McLaughlin 3	Attendance: n/a

28 August 2025	Brisbane Bullets	100–92	Sydney Kings	AIS Arena, Canberra
17:30	Scoring by quarter: 18–28, 24–21, 31–22, 27–21
Disney+/Kayo	Pts: Freeman-Liberty 27; Rebs: McDaniel, Smith-Milner 6 Asts: Adams 6	boxscore report	Pts: Soares 22; Rebs: Cooks 9 Asts: Dellavedova 10	Attendance: n/a

28 August 2025	Cairns Taipans	95–97(OT)	Tasmania JackJumpers	AIS Arena, Canberra
20:00	Scoring by quarter: 7–18, 33–27, 23–19, 24–23, Overtime: 8–10
Disney+/Kayo	Pts: Schofield 24; Rebs: Lee 11; Asts: Stattmann 6	boxscore report	Pts: Hamilton 25; Rebs: Bannan 11; Asts: Campbell 8	Attendance: n/a

29 August 2025	S.E. Melbourne Phoenix	101–109	New Zealand Breakers	AIS Arena, Canberra
17:30	Scoring by quarter: 27–31, 26–28, 22–27, 26–23
Disney+/Kayo	Pts: Hunter 21; Rebs: Lewis, Sobey 6 Asts: Foxwell, Sobey 5	boxscore report	Pts: Brockington 22; Rebs: Brockington 13; Asts: Jackson-Cartwright 5	Attendance: n/a

29 August 2025	Illawarra Hawks	100–92	Perth Wildcats	AIS Arena, Canberra
20:00	Scoring by quarter: 26–34, 22–28, 34–21, 18–9
Disney+/Kayo	Pts: McLaughlin 24; Rebs: Blanchfield, Bolden 7 Asts: McLaughlin 5	boxscore report	Pts: Windler 27; Rebs: Russo-Nance 8 Asts: three players 5	Attendance: n/a

30 August 2025	Melbourne United	98–60	Brisbane Bullets	AIS Arena, Canberra
17:45	Scoring by quarter: 20–11, 23–28, 21–17, 34–4
Disney+/Kayo	Pts: Walker 18; Rebs: Edwards 11; Asts: Walker 6	boxscore report	Pts: Smith-Milner 16; Rebs: Bradtke, Purchase 5 Asts: Freeman-Liberty 4	Attendance: n/a

30 August 2025	Tasmania JackJumpers	97–95	Adelaide 36ers	AIS Arena, Canberra
20:15	Scoring by quarter: 21–22, 23–19, 32–27, 21–27
Disney+/Kayo	Pts: Johnson 25; Rebs: Magnay 8 Asts: Campbell 8	boxscore report	Pts: Harris, White 18; Rebs: Cheatham 6 Asts: White 5	Attendance: n/a

31 August 2025	Sydney Kings	81–102	S.E. Melbourne Phoenix	AIS Arena, Canberra
15:30	Scoring by quarter: 16–28, 26–27, 23–22, 16–25
Disney+/Kayo	Pts: Soares 14; Rebs: Soares 8 Asts: Dellavedova 8	boxscore report	Pts: Glover 20; Rebs: Sobey 9 Asts: Foxwell 9	Attendance: n/a

31 August 2025	New Zealand Breakers	94–75	Cairns Taipans	AIS Arena, Canberra
18:00	Scoring by quarter: 26–25, 26–17, 25–21, 17–12
Disney+/Kayo	Pts: Te Rangi 20; Rebs: Bairstow, Te Rangi 6 Asts: Le'afa 7	boxscore report	Pts: Stattmann 15; Rebs: Higgins-Titsha 10; Asts: Adnam, Waardenburg 4	Attendance: n/a

=== Awards ===
The winning team will be awarded the Loggins-Bruton Cup, while the tournament’s most outstanding player will take home the Ray Borner Award.

- Loggins-Bruton Cup: New Zealand Breakers
- Most Valuable Player (Ray Borner Medal): Izaiah Brockington (New Zealand Breakers)

== Pavlos Giannakopoulos Tournament ==
18 September 2025	Panathinaikos B.C.	91–82	KK Partizan	John Cain Arena, Melbourne
19:30	Scoring by quarter: 20–27, 17–17, 25–14, 29–24
Fox Sports	Pts: Nunn 21; Rebs: Yurtseven 13; Asts: Nunn 8	boxscore report	Pts: Washington Jr. 19; Rebs: Parker 8 Asts: Brown 5	Attendance: 10,500

21 September 2025	KK Partizan	93–90	Sydney Kings	Sydney SuperDome, Sydney
16:30	Scoring by quarter: 30–23, 20–23, 19–20, 24–24
Fox Sports	Pts: Parker 24; Rebs: Parker 12; Asts: Jones 5	boxscore report	Pts: Galloway 20; Rebs: Cooks 13; Asts: Dellavedova 10	Attendance: n/a

21 September 2025	Panathinaikos B.C.	106–89	Adelaide 36ers	Sydney SuperDome, Sydney
19:00	Scoring by quarter: 17–19, 22–28, 34–21, 33–21
Fox Sports	Pts: Nunn 26; Rebs: Rogkavopoulos 8 Asts: Grant 10	boxscore report	Pts: Cotton 24; Rebs: Cheatham 9 Asts: Cotton 9	Attendance: n/a

== NBLxNBA games ==
On 11 March 2025, the National Basketball Association, National Basketball League and the Victoria State Government announced that the New Orleans Pelicans would play two exhibition games at Rod Laver Arena in Melbourne, Victoria against Melbourne United and the S.E. Melbourne Phoenix as part of the NBAxNBL: Melbourne Series. This will mark the first time an NBA team has played in Australia, and the first time that the S.E. Melbourne Phoenix have played against an NBA team.

3 October 2025	Melbourne United	97–107	New Orleans Pelicans	Rod Laver Arena, Melbourne
19:30	Scoring by quarter: 24–35, 27–27, 28–23, 18–22
10 Drama	Pts: Doyle 25; Rebs: Delany 9 Asts: Walker 5	boxscore report	Pts: Murphy 18; Rebs: Missi 8 Asts: Williamson 5	Attendance: 14,880; Referees: Brian Forte, Jason Goldenberg, Brandon Adair

5 October 2025	S.E. Melbourne Phoenix	92–127	New Orleans Pelicans	Rod Laver Arena, Melbourne
14:00	Scoring by quarter: 21–35, 34–39, 20–25, 17–28
Network 10	Pts: Hunter 17; Rebs: Brown 7 Asts: Sobey 5	boxscore report	Pts: Bey 21; Rebs: Williamson 9 Asts: Alvarado, Poole 4	Attendance: 15,164; Referees: Brian Forte, Jason Goldenberg, Brandon Adair
