= 2025–26 NBL Ignite Cup =

Basketball tournament

- Official poster for the NBL Ignite Cup

Tournament information
- Location: Local NBL cities (regular season); Broadbeach, Gold Coast (championship game)
- Date: 8 October 2025 – 22 February 2026
- Venues: Local NBL arenas (regular season); Gold Coast Convention Centre (championship game)
- Teams: 10
- Purse: See prize money

Final positions
- Champions: New Zealand Breakers (1st title)
- Runner-up: Adelaide 36ers
- MVP: Parker Jackson-Cartwright (New Zealand Breakers)

The 2025–26 NBL Ignite Cup was a multi-stage basketball tournament that was played during the 2025–26 NBL season. It was the first edition of the NBL Ignite Cup. The tournament was hosted from 8 October 2025 to 22 February 2026, beginning in Round 4 with the New Zealand Breakers defeating the Illawarra Hawks, 117–88 at Spark Arena.

The tournament's championship game was played at the Gold Coast Convention Centre on the Gold Coast, Queensland, where the New Zealand Breakers were crowned the inaugural Ignite Cup champions. Parker Jackson-Cartwright was named the Ignite Cup Final Player of the Game.

All 10 teams participated, each playing four regular season games that counted towards the tournament's standings and the league standings.

== Prize money ==
The winning team will receive $300,000 AUD, while the runner-up receives $100,000 AUD. 60 percent will go directly to the players, with the remaining 40 percent going to the clubs.

== Ignite Cup games ==
8 October 2025	New Zealand Breakers	117–88	Illawarra Hawks	Spark Arena, Auckland
19:30	Scoring by quarter: 30–24, 30–25, 27–23, 30–16
Sky Sport	Pts: Jackson-Cartwright, Mennenga 20; Rebs: López 9 Asts: Jackson-Cartwright 17	boxscore report	Pts: Harvey 22; Rebs: Blanchfield 8 Asts: Harvey 6	Attendance: 3,101

8 October 2025	Sydney Kings	93–107	Melbourne United	Sydney SuperDome, Sydney
19:30	Scoring by quarter: 25–29, 27–21, 19–31, 22–26
ESPN	Pts: Cooks, Davis 21; Rebs: Cooks 10; Asts: Dellavedova 7	boxscore report	Pts: Walker 27; Rebs: Edwards 12; Asts: Doyle 6	Attendance: 9,528

15 October 2025	Tasmania JackJumpers	86–70	Sydney Kings	Derwent Entertainment Centre, Hobart
19:30	Scoring by quarter: 29–19, 21–13, 19–18, 17–20
ESPN	Pts: Campbell 21; Rebs: Bannan 14; Asts: Bannan, Marshall 6	boxscore report	Pts: Galloway 13; Rebs: Cooks, Soares 8 Asts: three players 4	Attendance: 4,139

15 October 2025	Perth Wildcats	93–110	Brisbane Bullets	Perth Arena, Perth
18:30	Scoring by quarter: 21–26, 27–30, 23–24, 22–30
ESPN	Pts: Jones 19; Rebs: Doolittle 5 Asts: Doolittle 6	boxscore report	Pts: Prather 34; Rebs: Harrison 15; Asts: Adams, Patterson 6	Attendance: 6,110

22 October 2025	Cairns Taipans	78–110	Perth Wildcats	Cairns Convention Centre, Cairns
18:30	Scoring by quarter: 22–30, 20–30, 20–28, 16–22
ESPN	Pts: Schofield 16; Rebs: Galloway 8 Asts: Smith 5	boxscore report	Pts: Lual-Acuil 24; Rebs: Doolittle 8 Asts: three players 4	Attendance: 3,317

29 October 2025	Tasmania JackJumpers	84–95	Perth Wildcats	Derwent Entertainment Centre, Hobart
19:30	Scoring by quarter: 28–16, 13–21, 27–35, 16–23
ESPN	Pts: Hamilton 26; Rebs: Bannan 8 Asts: Campbell 7	boxscore report	Pts: Lual-Acuil 23; Rebs: Russo-Nance 7 Asts: Doolittle 4	Attendance: 4,139

5 November 2025	Illawarra Hawks	107–93	Melbourne United	Wollongong Entertainment Centre, Wollongong
19:30	Scoring by quarter: 32–22, 25–21, 22–25, 28–25
ESPN	Pts: McGee 37; Rebs: McGee 14; Asts: Hickey, Peterson 7	boxscore report	Pts: Delany 21; Rebs: Edwards, Krslovic 6 Asts: Doyle 11	Attendance: 3,012

12 November 2025	Brisbane Bullets	84–113	New Zealand Breakers	Gold Coast Sports Centre, Gold Coast
18:30	Scoring by quarter: 18–27, 18–41, 21–24, 27–21
ESPN	Pts: Prather 26; Rebs: Harrison, Prather 8 Asts: Ducas 5	boxscore report	Pts: Mennenga 25; Rebs: Baker 11; Asts: Jackson-Cartwright 7	Attendance: 2,275

19 November 2025	Adelaide 36ers	97–85	Illawarra Hawks	Adelaide Entertainment Centre, Adelaide
19:00	Scoring by quarter: 21–22, 23–27, 27–15, 26–21
ESPN	Pts: Cotton 31; Rebs: Humphries 9 Asts: Cotton 13	boxscore report	Pts: Harvey 21; Rebs: McGee 10; Asts: Hickey 7	Attendance: 9,964

3 December 2025	New Zealand Breakers	95–90	Sydney Kings	Claudelands Arena, Hamilton
19:30	Scoring by quarter: 26–27, 23–20, 19–27, 27–16
Sky Sport	Pts: Jackson-Cartwright 24; Rebs: López, Mennenga 6 Asts: Brockington 5	boxscore report	Pts: Davis 18; Rebs: Cooks 7 Asts: Davis 11	Attendance: 2,770

10 December 2025	S.E. Melbourne Phoenix	81–89	Tasmania JackJumpers	Gippsland Indoor Stadium, Traralgon
19:30	Scoring by quarter: 36–27, 12–25, 18–18, 15–19
ESPN	Pts: Iwundu 17; Rebs: Hunter, Iwundu 8 Asts: Iwundu 4	boxscore report	Pts: Hamilton 18; Rebs: Bannan 12; Asts: Bannan 4	Attendance: 1,953

17 December 2025	Sydney Kings	97–93(OT)	Adelaide 36ers	AIS Arena, Canberra
19:30	Scoring by quarter: 23–29, 20–27, 23–9, 19–20, Overtime: 12–8
ESPN	Pts: Cooks, Davis 27; Rebs: Cooks 8 Asts: Davis, Dellavedova 7	boxscore report	Pts: Cotton 25; Rebs: Cheatham 13; Asts: Cotton 9	Attendance: 4,154

24 December 2025	Adelaide 36ers	93–73	Cairns Taipans	Adelaide Entertainment Centre, Adelaide
17:00	Scoring by quarter: 23–21, 27–21, 23–19, 20–12
ESPN	Pts: Cotton 22; Rebs: Rakocevic 13; Asts: Cotton 11	boxscore report	Pts: Waardenburg 19; Rebs: five players 5 Asts: Andrews 6	Attendance: 10,006

31 December 2025	Illawarra Hawks	92–90	Tasmania JackJumpers	Wollongong Entertainment Centre, Wollongong
17:30	Scoring by quarter: 23–18, 27–21, 23–26, 19–25
ESPN	Pts: Froling, McGee 16; Rebs: Froling 10; Asts: Peterson 5	boxscore report	Pts: Bannan 25; Rebs: Magnay 8 Asts: Marshall 4	Attendance: 5,359

31 December 2025	Cairns Taipans	96–111	S.E. Melbourne Phoenix	Cairns Convention Centre, Cairns
18:30	Scoring by quarter: 28–21, 24–27, 26–35, 18–28
ESPN	Pts: McVeigh 26; Rebs: Andrews 7 Asts: Andrews 9	boxscore report	Pts: Sobey 31; Rebs: three players 5 Asts: Sobey 10	Attendance: 4,870

7 January 2026	Melbourne United	92–93	Cairns Taipans	Bendigo Stadium, Bendigo
19:30	Scoring by quarter: 22–29, 23–14, 30–33, 17–17
ESPN	Pts: Goulding 27; Rebs: Krebs 8 Asts: Delany, Walker 4	boxscore report	Pts: McVeigh, Waardenburg 20; Rebs: McVeigh, Waardenburg 9 Asts: Andrews 13	Attendance: 4,003

21 January 2026	Melbourne United	98–66	Brisbane Bullets	Bendigo Stadium, Bendigo
17:30	Scoring by quarter: 29–19, 28–17, 24–14, 17–16
ESPN	Pts: Walker 17; Rebs: Krslovic 8 Asts: Walker 5	boxscore report	Pts: Holt 23; Rebs: Holt 8 Asts: Maldonado, Taylor 4	Attendance: 3,978

21 January 2026	S.E. Melbourne Phoenix	123–116	New Zealand Breakers	State Basketball Centre, Melbourne
19:30	Scoring by quarter: 38–28, 36–26, 26–31, 23–31
ESPN	Pts: Clark 24; Rebs: Brown 9 Asts: Sobey 7	boxscore report	Pts: Mennenga 28; Rebs: López 8 Asts: Jackson-Cartwright 9	Attendance: 3,422

28 January 2026	Brisbane Bullets	74–107	Adelaide 36ers	Gold Coast Sports Centre, Gold Coast
18:30	Scoring by quarter: 24–33, 22–19, 9–16, 19–39
ESPN	Pts: Holt 24; Rebs: Taylor 10; Asts: Maldonado 8	boxscore report	Pts: Cotton 22; Rebs: Cheatham 7 Asts: Cotton 8	Attendance: 2,441

28 January 2026	Perth Wildcats	101–93	S.E. Melbourne Phoenix	Perth Arena, Perth
18:30	Scoring by quarter: 24–32, 25–19, 26–26, 26–16
ESPN	Pts: Windler 23; Rebs: Windler 11; Asts: Henshall 9	boxscore report	Pts: Sobey 28; Rebs: Brown 14; Asts: Iwundu 4	Attendance: 6,245

=== Championship game ===
22 February 2026	Adelaide 36ers	107–111	New Zealand Breakers	Gold Coast Convention Centre, Gold Coast
15:30	Scoring by quarter: 25–28, 29–19, 28–34, 25–30
10 Drama	Pts: Cotton 34; Rebs: Rakocevic 11; Asts: Cotton 9	boxscore report	Pts: Jackson-Cartwright 29; Rebs: López, Te Rangi 8 Asts: López, Jackson-Cartwright 5	Attendance: 5,078

== Ladder ==
Pos	Team	Pld	W	L	PF	PA	PP	BP	Pts	Qualification
1	Adelaide 36ers	4	3	1	390	329	118.5	12	21	Ignite Cup final
2	New Zealand Breakers	4	3	1	441	385	114.5	11	20	Ignite Cup final
3	Perth Wildcats	4	3	1	399	365	109.3	9.5	18.5	
4	Melbourne United	4	2	2	390	359	108.6	9.5	15.5	
5	Tasmania JackJumpers	4	2	2	349	338	103.3	8.5	14.5	
6	S.E. Melbourne Phoenix	4	2	2	408	402	101.5	8	14	
7	Illawarra Hawks	4	2	2	372	397	93.7	7	13	
8	Brisbane Bullets	4	1	3	334	411	81.3	6	9	
9	Sydney Kings	4	1	3	350	381	91.9	5	8	
10	Cairns Taipans	4	1	3	340	406	83.7	3.5	6.5	

Updated to match(es) played on 28 January 2026. Source: Ignitecup.com.au
