= 2026 NBL Finals =

Australasian basketball tournament

Team	Coach	Wins
Sydney Kings	Brian Goorjian	3
Adelaide 36ers	Mike Wells	2
- Country: Australia
- Dates: 4 March – 5 April
- Season: 2025–26
- Teams: 6
- Defending champions: Illawarra Hawks (did not qualify)
- MVP: Kendric Davis (Sydney)
- Semifinalists: S.E. Melbourne Phoenix; Perth Wildcats
- Matches played: 13
- Attendance: 131,478 (10,114 per match)
- Scoring leader: Kendric Davis 27.2
- All statistics correct as of 5 April 2026.

The 2026 NBL Finals was the postseason tournament of the National Basketball League's 2025–26 season.

As Australia and New Zealand participated in 2027 FIBA Basketball World Cup qualification, the league took a break during the FIBA international window of 23 February to 3 March 2026, following the final set of regular season fixtures.

== Format ==
The finals were played in March and April 2026 between the top six teams of the regular season, consisting of three play-in games, two best-of-three semifinal series and the best-of-five NBL Championship series, where the highest seed hosted the first, third and fifth games.

The top two seeds in the regular season automatically qualified to the semifinals. Teams ranked three to six competed in the play-in tournament. The third seed played the fourth seed for third spot and the loser played the winner of fifth or sixth for the fourth seed.

== Qualification ==
=== Qualified teams ===
Team	Date of qualification	Round of qualification	Finals appearance	Previous appearance	Previous best performance	Ref.
Adelaide 36ers	18 January 2026	17	27th	2025	Champions (1986, 1998, 1999, 2002)	
S.E. Melbourne Phoenix	21 January 2026	18	4th	2025	Semifinalist (2021)	
Sydney Kings	25 January 2026	18	20th	2025	Champions (2003, 2004, 2005, 2022, 2023)	
Melbourne United	25 January 2026	18	30th	2025	Champions (1993, 1997, 2006, 2008, 2018, 2021)	
Perth Wildcats	29 January 2026	19	39th	2025	Champions (1990, 1991, 1995, 2000, 2010, 2014, 2016, 2017, 2019, 2020)	
Tasmania JackJumpers	14 February 2026	21	4th	2024	Champions (2024)	

=== Ladder ===
Pos	2025–26 NBL season											
Pos	Team	Pld	W	L	PCT	Last 5	Streak	Home	Away	PF	PA	PP
1	Sydney Kings	33	24	9	72.73%	5–0	W11	13–4	11–5	3276	2879	113.79%
2	Adelaide 36ers	33	23	10	69.70%	2–3	L1	12–5	11–5	3042	2890	105.26%
3	S.E. Melbourne Phoenix	33	22	11	66.67%	3–2	L1	11–5	11–6	3324	3061	108.59%
4	Perth Wildcats	33	21	12	63.64%	4–1	W1	10–7	11–5	2996	2840	105.49%
5	Melbourne United	33	20	13	60.61%	2–3	W1	11–6	9–7	3041	2905	104.68%
6	Tasmania JackJumpers	33	14	19	42.42%	2–3	L2	6–10	8–9	2873	2884	99.62%
7	New Zealand Breakers	33	13	20	39.39%	2–3	W1	7–9	6–11	3022	3058	98.82%
8	Illawarra Hawks	33	13	20	39.39%	3–2	W2	7–9	6–11	3074	3205	95.91%
9	Cairns Taipans	33	9	24	27.27%	1–4	L2	4–13	5–11	2754	3194	86.22%
10	Brisbane Bullets	33	6	27	18.18%	0–5	L13	2–14	4–13	2710	3196	84.79%

Updated to match(es) played on 20 February 2026. Source: NBL.com.au

=== Ladder progression ===
Leader and qualification to semifinals
Qualification to semifinals
Qualification to play-in
Last place

2025–26 NBL season
Team ╲ Round	1	2	3	4	5	6	7	8	9	10	11	12	13	14	15	16	17	18	19	20	21	22
Adelaide 36ers	—	2	1	2	2	3	3	3	2	2	1	1	1	1	1	1	1	1	1	1	2	2
Brisbane Bullets	3	7	8	9	7	7	7	7	8	8	9	9	9	9	9	10	10	10	10	10	10	10
Cairns Taipans	7	4	7	7	8	10	9	10	10	10	10	10	10	10	10	9	9	9	9	9	9	9
Illawarra Hawks	—	9	9	8	10	8	10	8	7	9	8	8	8	8	7	8	8	7	8	8	8	8
Melbourne United	2	1	2	1	1	1	1	1	1	1	2	2	3	2	3	4	4	4	4	5	5	5
New Zealand Breakers	6	10	10	10	9	9	8	9	9	7	6	7	7	7	8	7	7	8	7	7	7	7
Perth Wildcats	5	6	4	3	6	5	5	5	5	4	4	5	5	5	5	5	5	5	5	4	4	4
S.E. Melbourne Phoenix	1	5	6	4	3	2	2	2	3	3	3	3	2	4	2	2	2	2	3	3	3	3
Sydney Kings	—	8	5	6	5	6	4	4	4	5	5	4	4	3	4	3	3	3	2	2	1	1
Tasmania JackJumpers	4	3	3	5	4	4	6	6	6	6	7	6	6	6	6	6	6	6	6	6	6	6

Updated to match(es) played on 20 February 2026. Source: NBL.com.au

=== Seedings ===
1. Sydney Kings
2. Adelaide 36ers
3. S.E. Melbourne Phoenix
4. Perth Wildcats
5. Melbourne United
6. Tasmania JackJumpers

The NBL tie-breaker system as outlined in the NBL Rules and Regulations states that in the case of an identical win–loss record, the overall points percentage will determine order of seeding.

=== Playoff Bracket ===
Play-in / Seeding qualifier
5	Melbourne United	82
6	Tasmania JackJumpers	68
3	S.E. Melbourne Phoenix	111
4	Perth Wildcats	94

Play-in game
4	Perth Wildcats	95
5	Melbourne United	77

Semifinals
1	Sydney Kings	105	89	X
4	Perth Wildcats	104	75	X
2	Adelaide 36ers	104	92	108
3	S.E. Melbourne Phoenix	97	101	96

Championship
1	Sydney Kings	112	89	106	91	113
2	Adelaide 36ers	68	91	93	92	101

== Play-in tournament ==
=== (3) S.E. Melbourne Phoenix vs. (4) Perth Wildcats ===
4 March 2026	S.E. Melbourne Phoenix	111–94	Perth Wildcats	John Cain Arena, Melbourne
19:30	Scoring by quarter: 35–29, 29–18, 22–17, 25–30
ESPN	Pts: Sobey 24; Rebs: Brown 8 Asts: Sobey 7	boxscore report	Pts: Doolittle 22; Rebs: three players 6 Asts: Windler 7	Attendance: 3,981; Referees: Ken Arrick, James Griguol, Vaughan Mayberry

Regular season series
Series tied 2–2 in the regular season series

2 November 2025

boxscore

S.E. Melbourne Phoenix 94, Perth Wildcats 89

John Cain Arena, Melbourne

18 December 2025

boxscore

Perth Wildcats 76, S.E. Melbourne Phoenix 77

Perth Arena, Perth

10 January 2026

boxscore

S.E. Melbourne Phoenix 97, Perth Wildcats 107

State Basketball Centre, Melbourne

28 January 2026

boxscore

Perth Wildcats 101, S.E. Melbourne Phoenix 93

Perth Arena, Perth

=== (5) Melbourne United vs. (6) Tasmania JackJumpers ===
5 March 2026	Melbourne United	82–68	Tasmania JackJumpers	John Cain Arena, Melbourne
19:30	Scoring by quarter: 15–17, 25–14, 16–24, 26–13
ESPN	Pts: Delany 33; Rebs: Krslovic 7 Asts: Doyle, Walker 6	boxscore report	Pts: Marshall 20; Rebs: Deng 9 Asts: Campbell 6	Attendance: 5,071; Referees: Chris Reid, Ken Widgeon, Ruben Woolcock

Regular season series
Series tied 2–2 in the regular season series

18 September 2025

boxscore

Tasmania JackJumpers 84, Melbourne United 88

Derwent Entertainment Centre, Hobart

23 December 2025

boxscore

Melbourne United 73, Tasmania JackJumpers 92

John Cain Arena, Melbourne

3 January 2026

boxscore

Tasmania JackJumpers 84, Melbourne United 75

Derwent Entertainment Centre, Hobart

17 January 2026

boxscore

Melbourne United 79, Tasmania JackJumpers 77

Perth Arena, Perth

=== (4) Perth Wildcats vs. (5) Melbourne United ===
7 March 2026	Perth Wildcats	95–77	Melbourne United	Perth Arena, Perth
17:00	Scoring by quarter: 22–19, 22–34, 23–10, 28–14
ESPN	Pts: Lual-Acuil28; Rebs: Lual-Acuil 12; Asts: Doolittle, Henshall 6	boxscore report	Pts: Doyle 13; Rebs: Edwards 8 Asts: Delany 3	Attendance: 6,731; Referees: Ken Arrick, Michael Aylen, Nico Fernandes

Regular season series
Melbourne won 2–1 in the regular season series

23 November 2025

boxscore

Melbourne United 98, Perth Wildcats 87

John Cain Arena, Melbourne

4 December 2025

boxscore

Perth Wildcats 96, Melbourne United 84

Perth Arena, Perth

25 January 2026

boxscore

Perth Wildcats 73, Melbourne United 74

Perth Arena, Perth

== Semifinals series ==
=== (1) Sydney Kings vs. (4) Perth Wildcats ===
11 March 2026	Sydney Kings	105–104 (Series: Sydney leads series, 1–0)	Perth Wildcats	Sydney SuperDome, Sydney
19:30	Scoring by quarter: 22–24, 26–20, 25–31, 32–29
ESPN	Pts: Davis 35; Rebs: Craig 9 Asts: Davis 6	boxscore report	Pts: Doolittle 31; Rebs: Lual-Acuil 12; Asts: Duke 8	Attendance: 10,132; Referees: Nico Fernandes, Vaughan Mayberry, Ken Widgeon

14 March 2026	Perth Wildcats	75–89 (Series: Sydney wins series, 2–0)	Sydney Kings	Perth Arena, Perth
17:00	Scoring by quarter: 23–22, 23–21, 13–17, 16–29
ESPN	Pts: Henshall 20; Rebs: Lual-Acuil 14; Asts: Duke 5	boxscore report	Pts: Davis 27; Rebs: Maluach 8 Asts: Davis, Dellavedova 5	Attendance: 9,711; Referees: Michael Aylen, Nico Fernandes, Ken Widgeon

Regular season series
Sydney won 3–0 in the regular season series

19 October 2025

boxscore

Sydney Kings 94, Perth Wildcats 72

Sydney SuperDome, Sydney

12 December 2025

boxscore

Perth Wildcats 79, Sydney Kings 108

Perth Arena, Perth

15 February 2026

boxscore

Sydney Kings 102, Perth Wildcats 84

Sydney SuperDome, Sydney

=== (2) Adelaide 36ers vs. (3) S.E. Melbourne Phoenix ===
10 March 2026	Adelaide 36ers	104–97 (Series: Adelaide leads series, 1–0)	S.E. Melbourne Phoenix	Adelaide Entertainment Centre, Adelaide
19:00	Scoring by quarter: 25–27, 25–21, 27–27, 27–22
ESPN	Pts: Cotton 42; Rebs: Rakocevic 10; Asts: three players 5	boxscore report	Pts: Sobey 23; Rebs: Sobey 10; Asts: Sobey 7	Attendance: 10,055; Referees: Ken Arrick, Michael Aylen, Chris Reid

14 March 2026	S.E. Melbourne Phoenix	101–92 (Series: Series tied, 1–1)	Adelaide 36ers	John Cain Arena, Melbourne
17:30	Scoring by quarter: 19–30, 25–27, 39–20, 18–15
ESPN	Pts: Sobey 41; Rebs: Brown 7 Asts: Foxwell 7	boxscore report	Pts: Cotton 29; Rebs: Rakocevic 10; Asts: Cameron 8	Attendance: 5,600; Referees: Ken Arrick, Vaughan Mayberry, Chris Reid

17 March 2026	Adelaide 36ers	108–96 (Series: Adelaide wins series, 2–1)	S.E. Melbourne Phoenix	Adelaide Entertainment Centre, Adelaide
19:00	Scoring by quarter: 28–17, 31–28, 24–19, 25–32
ESPN	Pts: Cotton 38; Rebs: Cheatham 13; Asts: Cotton 7	boxscore report	Pts: Clark 32; Rebs: Brown 10; Asts: Sobey 8	Attendance: 10,018

Regular season series
Series tied 2–2 in the regular season series

16 October 2025

boxscore

Adelaide 36ers vs. S.E. Melbourne Phoenix 71

Adelaide Entertainment Centre, Adelaide

22 November 2025

boxscore

S.E. Melbourne Phoenix 81, Adelaide 36ers 94

John Cain Arena, Melbourne

18 January 2026

boxscore

Adelaide 36ers 89, S.E. Melbourne Phoenix 108

Perth Arena, Perth

31 January 2026

boxscore

Adelaide 36ers 77, S.E. Melbourne Phoenix 97

Adelaide Entertainment Centre, Adelaide

== Championship series ==
=== (1) Sydney Kings vs. (2) Adelaide 36ers ===
21 March 2026	Sydney Kings	112–68 (Series: Sydney leads series, 1–0)	Adelaide 36ers	Sydney SuperDome, Sydney
19:00	Scoring by quarter: 31–23, 28–16, 31–17, 22–12
ESPN	Pts: Davis 25; Rebs: Soares 8 Asts: Davis 7	boxscore report	Pts: White 11; Rebs: Cheatham 7 Asts: Cotton 7	Attendance: 13,181; Referees: Vaughan Mayberry, Chris Reid, Ken Widgeon

27 March 2026	Adelaide 36ers	91–89 (Series: Series tied, 1–1)	Sydney Kings	Adelaide Entertainment Centre, Adelaide
19:00	Scoring by quarter: 25–30, 28–22, 15–22, 23–12
ESPN	Pts: Cotton 28; Rebs: Rakocevic 9 Asts: Cheatham 7	boxscore report	Pts: Davis 20; Rebs: Cooks, Craig 10; Asts: Dellavedova 7	Attendance: 10,058; Referees: Ken Arrick, Michael Aylen, James Griguol

29 March 2026	Sydney Kings	106–93 (Series: Sydney leads series, 2–1)	Adelaide 36ers	Sydney SuperDome, Sydney
14:30	Scoring by quarter: 24–31, 28–22, 21–17, 33–23
Network 10	Pts: Davis 34; Rebs: Soares 10; Asts: Davis 15	boxscore report	Pts: Jenkins 22; Rebs: Cheatham 10; Asts: Cotton 12	Attendance: 18,373; Referees: Vaughan Mayberry, Chris Reid, Ken Widgeon

1 April 2026	Adelaide 36ers	92–91 (Series: Series tied, 2–2)	Sydney Kings	Adelaide Entertainment Centre, Adelaide
19:00	Scoring by quarter: 22–24, 24–29, 26–21, 20–17
ESPN	Pts: Cheatham 23; Rebs: Humphries 10; Asts: Cotton 12	boxscore report	Pts: Davis 22; Rebs: Soares 9 Asts: Davis 10	Attendance: 10,068; Referees: Michael Aylen, James Griguol, Vaughan Mayberry

5 April 2026	Sydney Kings	113–101(OT) (Series: Sydney wins series, 3–2)	Adelaide 36ers	Sydney SuperDome, Sydney
14:30	Scoring by quarter: 29–31, 27–24, 13–21, 26–19, Overtime: 18–6
Network 10	Pts: Davis 35; Rebs: Cooks 12; Asts: Davis 14	boxscore report	Pts: Cotton 35; Rebs: Rakocevic 13; Asts: Cotton 9	Attendance: 18,589; Referees: James Griguol, Vaughan Mayberry, Chris Reid

Regular season series
Sydney won 3–1 in the regular season series

11 October 2025

boxscore

Adelaide 36ers 79, Sydney Kings 103

Adelaide Entertainment Centre, Adelaide

17 December 2025

boxscore

Sydney Kings 97, Adelaide 36ers 93 (OT)

AIS Arena, Canberra

2 January 2026

boxscore

Adelaide 36ers 85, Sydney Kings 79

Adelaide Entertainment Centre, Adelaide

25 January 2026

boxscore

Sydney Kings 106, Adelaide 36ers 101

Sydney SuperDome, Sydney

== Media coverage ==
=== Television ===
The league extended its partnership with ESPN Australia. All games are available live on ESPN, Kayo Sports, Network 10 and Disney+. In New Zealand, Sky Sport will be the official league broadcaster.

== See also ==
- 2025–26 NBL season
- 2024–25 NBL regular season
