= NBAxNBL: Melbourne Series =

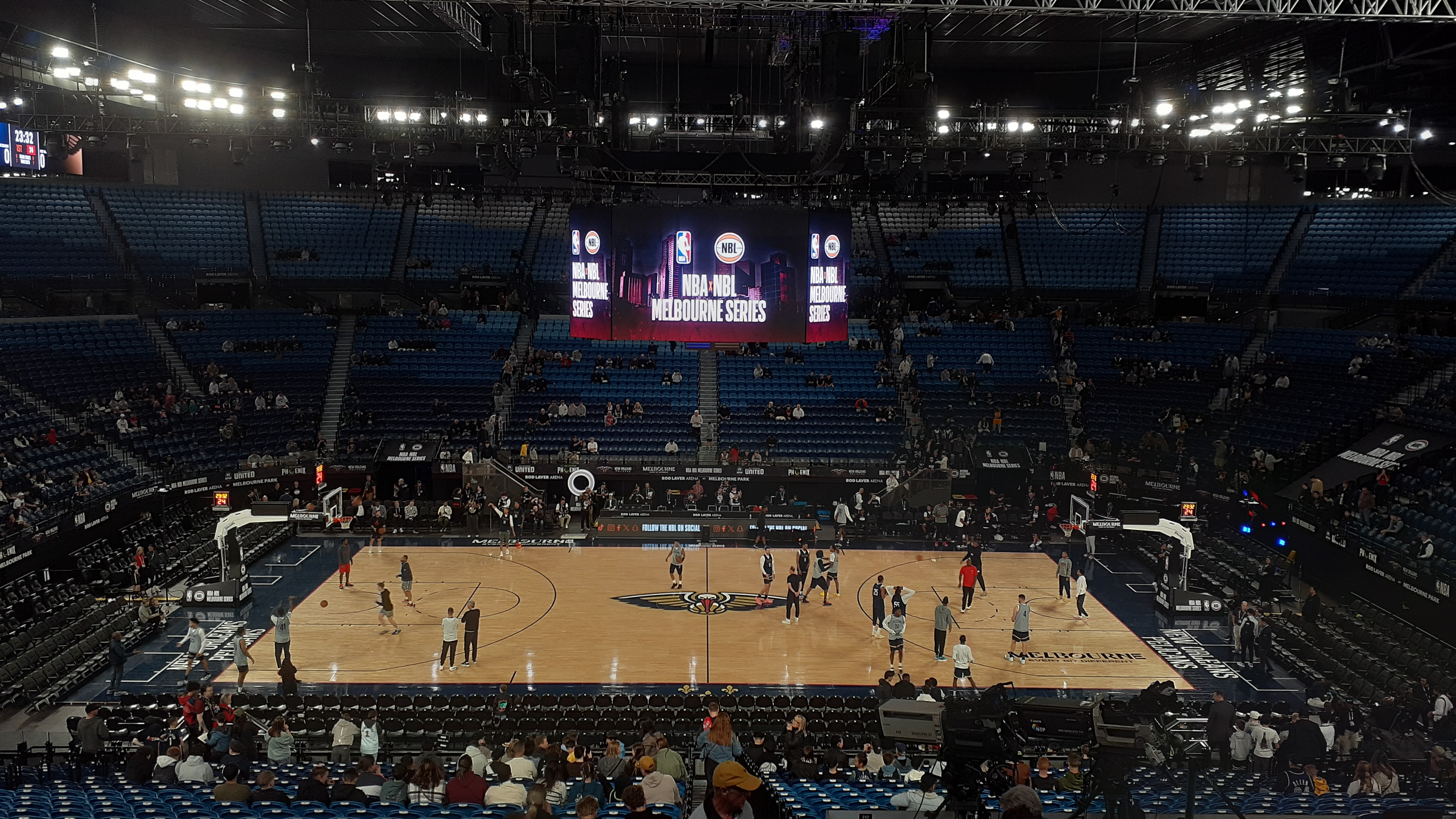
- Rod Laver Arena during the NBAxNBL Melbourne Series
- League: National Basketball Association; National Basketball League
- Season: 2025–26
- Duration: 4 days
- Games played: 2
- Teams: 3
- TV partners: 10 Drama, Network 10, Amazon Prime Video, NBA League Pass

The NBAxNBL: Melbourne Series was a series of pre-season exhibition basketball events that took place between 2 - 5 October 2025 at the Rod Laver Arena and Centrepiece in Melbourne, Victoria, Australia. The event was part of the NBLxNBA series, and was the first time that the series was played in Australia. The event featured the New Orleans Pelicans of the National Basketball Association playing against Melbourne United and the South East Melbourne Phoenix of the National Basketball League in two separate exhibition games, as well as a Pelicans Open Training Session on 2 October 2025 and a Fan Night on 4 October 2025.

The event was announced on 11 March 2025, as a collaboration between the National Basketball Association, National Basketball League and the Victoria State Government. The event marked the first time that an NBA team has played in Australia, as well as the first time that the South East Melbourne Phoenix have played against an NBA team. The Exhibition Games were played under NBA Rules, similar to previous NBLxNBA games in the USA.

== Background ==
On 11 March 2025, the National Basketball Association, National Basketball League and the Victoria State Government announced that the New Orleans Pelicans of the NBA would play two exhibition games in Melbourne, Victoria, Australia. It was announced that the NBL would be the official promoter and organiser of the Melbourne Series, and the Pelicans would play NBL sides Melbourne United on 3 October 2025, as well as the South East Melbourne Phoenix on 5 October 2025. The Pelicans will also participate in NBA Cares community outreach initiatives and lifestyle events, including a fan night on 4 October 2025.

On 11 June 2025, along with the announcement of the General Public Ticket Sale, it was announced that the New Orleans Pelicans would be hosting an open training session at Rod Laver Arena on 2 October 2025, ahead of their first exhibition game the day after. On 5 September 2025, it was also announced that NBA Naismith Hall-of-Famer Ray Allen would be in attendance at the open training session, participating in an on-court Q&A during the event. Allen was joined by Kevin Garnett for the Q&A. The Harlem Globetrotters and Australian hip-hop group Bliss n Eso also appeared at the Pelicans Open Training Session.

On 5 September 2025, it was announced that multi-platinum ARIA Award-winning singer-songwriter Tones And I would be performing as the Half Time Entertainment at the Melbourne United vs New Orleans Pelicans Game, as well as headlining the Fan Night the following day.

On 19 September 2025, the NBL announced that the Southern Tip-Off Event would be held at Centrepiece, adjacent from Rod Laver Arena in Melbourne Park. The Event will be a Luncheon featuring Ray Allen, Kevin Garnett, Andrew Gaze and Michele Timms.

On 27 September 2025, it was announced that both of the exhibition games would be broadcast on Free-to-Air TV in Australia via 10 Drama for Game 1 & Network 10 for Game 2, as well as on streaming via Amazon Prime Video and NBA League Pass.

On 29 September 2025, the NBL announced that there would be a fan zone called "Bounce Nation", located on the concourse of Rod Laver Arena, throughout the four day event. Bounce Nation will feature the "Style and Shoot Zone", Live Entertainment, the NBL Performance House, "The Court: Street Nation", a Merchandise Store, the NBA2K Fan Zone, and a Signing Marquee.

== Venues ==
Both exhibition games, as well as the New Orleans Pelicans' open training session and Fan Night, was held at the Rod Laver Arena. The Southern Tip-Off Event was held at Centrepiece. Both venues are located at Melbourne Park in Melbourne, Victoria, Australia.

Australia
Melbourne
Rod Laver Arena	Centrepiece
Capacity: 14,500	Capacity: 2,400

== Games ==
10 Drama / Amazon Prime Video

3 October 2025
19:30

boxscore
report

Melbourne United (Australia)	97–107	New Orleans Pelicans (United States)
Scoring by quarter: 24–35, 27–27, 28–23, 18–22
Pts: Doyle 25; Rebs: Delany 9 Asts: Walker 5		Pts: Murphy 18; Rebs: Missi 8 Asts: Williamson 5

Rod Laver Arena, Melbourne
Attendance: 14,880
Referees: Brian Forte, Jason Goldenberg, Brandon Adair

Network 10 / Amazon Prime Video

5 October 2025
14:00

boxscore
report

S.E. Melbourne Phoenix (Australia)	92–127	New Orleans Pelicans (United States)
Scoring by quarter: 21–35, 34–39, 20–25, 17–28
Pts: Hunter 17; Rebs: Brown 7 Asts: Sobey 5		Pts: Bey 21; Rebs: Williamson 9 Asts: Alvarado, Poole 4

Rod Laver Arena, Melbourne
Attendance: 15,164
Referees: Brian Forte, Jason Goldenberg, Brandon Adair

== See also ==
- NBLxNBA
- List of games played between NBA and international teams
