= 2025–26 S.E. Melbourne Phoenix season =

Australian professional basketball season

- Head coach: (United States) Josh King
- Co-captains: (Australia) Jordan Hunter (Australia) Nathan Sobey
- Arena: John Cain Arena

NBL results
- Record: 22–11 (66.7%)
- Ladder: 3rd
- Finals finish: Semifinalist (lost to 36ers 1–2)
- Stats at NBL.com.au

Ignite Cup results
- Record: 2–2 (50%)
- Ladder: 6th
- Ignite Cup finish: Did not qualify
- All statistics correct as of 17 March 2026.

The 2025–26 S.E. Melbourne Phoenix season was the 7th season of the franchise in the National Basketball League (NBL), and their second under the leadership of head coach Josh King.

== Roster ==
Note: Flags indicate national team eligibility at FIBA-sanctioned events. Players may hold other non-FIBA nationalities not displayed.

2025–26 S.E. Melbourne Phoenix roster
Players
Coaches

Pos.	No.	Nat.	Name	Ht.	Wt.
F	0	(United States)	Brown, John (I)	2.03 m (6 ft 8 in)	98 kg (216 lb)
C	1	(Australia)	Hunter, Jordan (C)	2.13 m (7 ft 0 in)	109 kg (240 lb)
G	2	(Australia)	Ryan, Pat (DP)	1.98 m (6 ft 6 in)
F	4	(Australia)	Biggar, Ellis	2.08 m (6 ft 10 in)
G	5	(Australia)	Glover, Angus	1.94 m (6 ft 4 in)	90 kg (198 lb)
F	7	(Australia)	Aliir, Akech	2.04 m (6 ft 8 in)	102 kg (225 lb)
F	8	(Australia)	Mitchell, D. J.	2.03 m (6 ft 8 in)	106 kg (234 lb)
G	11	(Australia)	Foster, Daniel	1.97 m (6 ft 6 in)	98 kg (216 lb)
G	15	(Australia)	Foxwell, Austin (DP)
G	20	(Australia)	Sobey, Nathan (C)	1.90 m (6 ft 3 in)	82 kg (181 lb)
G	21	(United States)	Clark, Ian (I)	1.90 m (6 ft 3 in)	79 kg (174 lb)
G/F	25	(United States)	Iwundu, Wes (I)	1.98 m (6 ft 6 in)	88 kg (194 lb)
G	30	(Australia)	Foxwell, Owen	1.88 m (6 ft 2 in)	81 kg (179 lb)
F	33	(Trinidad and Tobago)	Lewis, Malique (NS)	2.02 m (6 ft 8 in)	88 kg (194 lb)

Head coach

- (United States) Josh King

Assistant coach(es)

- (Australia) Luke Brennan
- (Australia) Adam Gibson
- (United States) Dan Ryan

Legend

- (C) Team captain
- (DP) Development player
- (IN) Inactive
- (I) Import player
- (SRP) Special restricted player
- (NS) Next Star player
- Injured

- Roster
Updated: 29 December 2025

=== Depth chart ===
Pos.	Starting 5	Bench 1	Development
PG	Owen Foxwell	Ian Clark (I)	Austin Foxwell (DP)
SG	Nathan Sobey	Angus Glover	Pat Ryan (DP)
SF	Wes Iwundu (I)	Malique Lewis (NS)	Daniel Foster
PF	John Brown (I)	D. J. Mitchell	Ellis Biggar (DP)
C	Jordan Hunter	Akech Aliir

== Standings ==
=== Ladder ===
Pos	2025–26 NBL season											
Pos	Team	Pld	W	L	PCT	Last 5	Streak	Home	Away	PF	PA	PP
1	Sydney Kings	33	24	9	72.73%	5–0	W11	13–4	11–5	3276	2879	113.79%
2	Adelaide 36ers	33	23	10	69.70%	2–3	L1	12–5	11–5	3042	2890	105.26%
3	S.E. Melbourne Phoenix	33	22	11	66.67%	3–2	L1	11–5	11–6	3324	3061	108.59%
4	Perth Wildcats	33	21	12	63.64%	4–1	W1	10–7	11–5	2996	2840	105.49%
5	Melbourne United	33	20	13	60.61%	2–3	W1	11–6	9–7	3041	2905	104.68%
6	Tasmania JackJumpers	33	14	19	42.42%	2–3	L2	6–10	8–9	2873	2884	99.62%
7	New Zealand Breakers	33	13	20	39.39%	2–3	W1	7–9	6–11	3022	3058	98.82%
8	Illawarra Hawks	33	13	20	39.39%	3–2	W2	7–9	6–11	3074	3205	95.91%
9	Cairns Taipans	33	9	24	27.27%	1–4	L2	4–13	5–11	2754	3194	86.22%
10	Brisbane Bullets	33	6	27	18.18%	0–5	L13	2–14	4–13	2710	3196	84.79%

Updated to match(es) played on 20 February 2026. Source: NBL.com.au

The NBL tie-breaker system as outlined in the NBL Rules and Regulations states that in the case of an identical win–loss record, the overall points percentage will determine order of seeding.

=== Ladder progression ===
Leader and qualification to semifinals
Qualification to semifinals
Qualification to play-in
Last place

2025–26 NBL season
Team ╲ Round	1	2	3	4	5	6	7	8	9	10	11	12	13	14	15	16	17	18	19	20	21	22
Adelaide 36ers	—	2	1	2	2	3	3	3	2	2	1	1	1	1	1	1	1	1	1	1	2	2
Brisbane Bullets	3	7	8	9	7	7	7	7	8	8	9	9	9	9	9	10	10	10	10	10	10	10
Cairns Taipans	7	4	7	7	8	10	9	10	10	10	10	10	10	10	10	9	9	9	9	9	9	9
Illawarra Hawks	—	9	9	8	10	8	10	8	7	9	8	8	8	8	7	8	8	7	8	8	8	8
Melbourne United	2	1	2	1	1	1	1	1	1	1	2	2	3	2	3	4	4	4	4	5	5	5
New Zealand Breakers	6	10	10	10	9	9	8	9	9	7	6	7	7	7	8	7	7	8	7	7	7	7
Perth Wildcats	5	6	4	3	6	5	5	5	5	4	4	5	5	5	5	5	5	5	5	4	4	4
S.E. Melbourne Phoenix	1	5	6	4	3	2	2	2	3	3	3	3	2	4	2	2	2	2	3	3	3	3
Sydney Kings	—	8	5	6	5	6	4	4	4	5	5	4	4	3	4	3	3	3	2	2	1	1
Tasmania JackJumpers	4	3	3	5	4	4	6	6	6	6	7	6	6	6	6	6	6	6	6	6	6	6

Updated to match(es) played on 20 February 2026. Source: NBL.com.au

== Game log ==
=== Pre-season ===
The 2025 NBL Blitz will run from 27 to 31 August 2025 with games being played at the AIS Arena, Canberra.

2025 NBL Blitz game log
Total: 1–1 (Home: 0–1; Road: 1–0)
August: 1–1 (Home: 0–1; Road: 1–0)

Game	Date	Team	Score	High points	High rebounds	High assists	Location Attendance	Record
1	29 August	New Zealand	L 101–109	Jordan Hunter (21)	Lewis, Sobey (6)	Foxwell, Sobey (5)	AIS Arena n/a	0–1
2	31 August	@ Sydney	W 81–102	Angus Glover (20)	Nathan Sobey (9)	Owen Foxwell (9)	AIS Arena n/a	1–1

=== NBLxNBA games ===
2025 pre-season game log
Total: 0–1 (Home: 0–0; Road: 0–1)
October: 0–1 (Home: 0–0; Road: 0–1)

Game	Date	Team	Score	High points	High rebounds	High assists	Location Attendance	Record
1	5 October	@ New Orleans	L 92–127	Jordan Hunter (17)	John Brown (7)	Nathan Sobey (5)	Rod Laver Arena; 15,164	0–1

=== Regular season ===
The regular season will begin on 18 September 2025. It will consist of 165 games (33 games each) spread across 22 rounds, with the final game being played on 20 February 2026.

2025–26 game log
Total: 22–11 (Home: 11–5; Road: 11–6)
September: 1–1 (Home: 1–0; Road: 0–1)

Game	Date	Team	Score	High points	High rebounds	High assists	Location Attendance	Record
1	20 September	Cairns	W 114–77	Angus Glover (18)	Hunter, Lewis (8)	Nathan Sobey (8)	John Cain Arena; 5,371	1–0
2	25 September	@ Melbourne	L 103–83	Nathan Sobey (26)	Glover, Gak (6)	Hunter Maldonado (7)	John Cain Arena; 10,035	1–1

October: 4–1 (Home: 2–0; Road: 2–1)

Game	Date	Team	Score	High points	High rebounds	High assists	Location Attendance	Record
3	12 October	@ New Zealand	W 81–87	Owen Foxwell (19)	Jordan Hunter (7)	Foxwell, Sobey (7)	Spark Arena; 4,520	2–1
4	16 October	@ Adelaide	L 88–71	Jordan Hunter (16)	Hunter, Sobey (7)	Hunter Maldonado (7)	Adelaide Entertainment Centre; 9,802	2–2
5	18 October	Illawarra	W 116–76	Angus Glover (26)	Jordan Hunter (9)	Hunter Maldonado (9)	John Cain Arena; 5,615	3–2
6	23 October	Sydney	W 112–95	Nathan Sobey (33)	Owen Foxwell (6)	Owen Foxwell (8)	John Cain Arena; 3,786	4–2
7	25 October	@ Brisbane	W 86–109	Nathan Sobey (29)	Malique Lewis (8)	Hunter Maldonado (7)	Brisbane Entertainment Centre; 5,244	5–2

November: 4–2 (Home: 1–2; Road: 3–0)

Game	Date	Team	Score	High points	High rebounds	High assists	Location Attendance	Record
8	2 November	Perth	W 94–89	Nathan Sobey (22)	Malique Lewis (11)	Malique Lewis (6)	John Cain Arena; 9,386	6–2
9	6 November	@ Tasmania	W 102–103	Nathan Sobey (28)	John Brown (14)	three players (4)	Silverdome; 3,255	7–2
10	8 November	Melbourne	L 81–92	Nathan Sobey (15)	John Brown (8)	Foster, Foxwell (7)	John Cain Arena; 8,806	7–3
11	14 November	@ Cairns	W 90–101	Angus Glover (24)	John Brown (6)	Owen Foxwell (7)	Cairns Convention Centre; 3,567	8–3
12	20 November	@ Brisbane	W 76–103	Jordan Hunter (24)	Jordan Hunter (9)	Nathan Sobey (6)	Brisbane Entertainment Centre; 3,429	9–3
13	22 November	Adelaide	L 81–94	Nathan Sobey (26)	Jordan Hunter (12)	Wes Iwundu (6)	John Cain Arena; 5,906	9–4

December: 5–3 (Home: 3–1; Road: 2–2)

Game	Date	Team	Score	High points	High rebounds	High assists	Location Attendance	Record
14	4 December	@ Illawarra	L 113–109 (OT)	Wes Iwundu (22)	John Brown (10)	Hunter Maldonado (7)	Wollongong Entertainment Centre; 3,432	9–5
15	7 December	Melbourne	W 111–86	Nathan Sobey (25)	Akech Aliir (8)	John Brown (5)	John Cain Arena; 10,175	10–5
16	10 December	Tasmania	L 81–89	Wes Iwundu (17)	Hunter, Iwundu (8)	Wes Iwundu (4)	Gippsland Indoor Stadium; 1,953	10–6
17	13 December	New Zealand	W 92–80	Nathan Sobey (36)	Jordan Hunter (9)	Brown, Sobey (5)	Gippsland Indoor Stadium; 2,581	11–6
18	18 December	@ Perth	W 76–77	Jordan Hunter (18)	Jordan Hunter (8)	Nathan Sobey (5)	Perth Arena; 10,802	12–6
19	20 December	Brisbane	W 107–78	Nathan Sobey (20)	Hunter Maldonado (5)	Nathan Sobey (8)	John Cain Arena; 10,175	13–6
20	29 December	@ Tasmania	L 87–84	Nathan Sobey (27)	John Brown (10)	Nathan Sobey (5)	Derwent Entertainment Centre; 4,340	13–7
21	31 December	@ Cairns	W 96–111	Nathan Sobey (31)	three players (5)	Nathan Sobey (10)	Cairns Convention Centre; 4,870	14–7

January: 6–2 (Home: 3–1; Road: 3–1)

Game	Date	Team	Score	High points	High rebounds	High assists	Location Attendance	Record
22	5 January	@ Sydney	W 117–124	Nathan Sobey (26)	John Brown (8)	Nathan Sobey (5)	Sydney SuperDome; 10,825	15–7
23	8 January	Illawarra	W 124–113 (OT)	Nathan Sobey (37)	Foxwell, Iwundu (7)	Owen Foxwell (6)	State Basketball Centre; 3,422	16–7
24	10 January	Perth	L 97–107	Wes Iwundu (27)	Angus Glover (7)	Nathan Sobey (8)	State Basketball Centre; 3,422	16–8
25	18 January	@ Adelaide	W 89–108	Ian Clark (27)	Jordan Hunter (9)	Owen Foxwell (12)	Perth Arena; 6,953	17–8
26	21 January	New Zealand	W 123–116	Ian Clark (24)	John Brown (9)	Nathan Sobey (7)	State Basketball Centre; 3,422	18–8
27	24 January	Cairns	W 118–91	Angus Glover (22)	John Brown (8)	Nathan Sobey (9)	State Basketball Centre; 3,422	19–8
28	28 January	@ Perth	L 101–93	Nathan Sobey (28)	John Brown (14)	Wes Iwundu (4)	Perth Arena; 6,245	19–9
29	31 January	@ Adelaide	W 77–97	Nathan Sobey (19)	John Brown (13)	Brown, Foxwell (5)	Adelaide Entertainment Centre; 10,047	20–9

February: 2–2 (Home: 1–1; Road: 1–1)

Game	Date	Team	Score	High points	High rebounds	High assists	Location Attendance	Record
30	5 February	@ New Zealand	W 83–114	Ian Clark (23)	Hunter, Lewis (10)	Malique Lewis (6)	Eventfinda Stadium; 1,703	21–9
31	8 February	Sydney	L 88–114	Brown, Sobey (15)	Jordan Hunter (7)	Owen Foxwell (7)	John Cain Arena; 10,175	21–10
32	14 February	Tasmania	W 120–104	Angus Glover (21)	Angus Glover (7)	Nathan Sobey (9)	John Cain Arena; 7,328	22–10
33	19 February	@ Melbourne	L 95–91	Nathan Sobey (29)	Nathan Sobey (7)	Malique Lewis (4)	John Cain Arena; 8,919	22–11

2025–26 season schedule

=== NBL Ignite Cup ===
The NBL introduced the new NBL Ignite Cup tournament for the 2025–26 season, with all games except the championship final counting towards the regular-season standings.

Pos	Team	Pld	W	L	PF	PA	PP	BP	Pts	Qualification
1	Adelaide 36ers	4	3	1	390	329	118.5	12	21	Ignite Cup final
2	New Zealand Breakers	4	3	1	441	385	114.5	11	20	Ignite Cup final
3	Perth Wildcats	4	3	1	399	365	109.3	9.5	18.5	
4	Melbourne United	4	2	2	390	359	108.6	9.5	15.5	
5	Tasmania JackJumpers	4	2	2	349	338	103.3	8.5	14.5	
6	S.E. Melbourne Phoenix	4	2	2	408	402	101.5	8	14	
7	Illawarra Hawks	4	2	2	372	397	93.7	7	13	
8	Brisbane Bullets	4	1	3	334	411	81.3	6	9	
9	Sydney Kings	4	1	3	350	381	91.9	5	8	
10	Cairns Taipans	4	1	3	340	406	83.7	3.5	6.5	

Updated to match(es) played on 28 January 2026. Source: Ignitecup.com.au

=== Postseason ===
2026 finals game log
Total: 2–2 (Home: 2–0; Road: 0–2)
Seeding qualifier: 1–0 (Home: 1–0; Road: 0–0)

Game	Date	Team	Score	High points	High rebounds	High assists	Location Attendance	Record
1	4 March	Perth	W 111–94	Nathan Sobey (24)	John Brown (8)	Nathan Sobey (7)	John Cain Arena; 3,891	1–0

Semifinals: 1–2 (Home: 1–0; Road: 0–2)

Game	Date	Team	Score	High points	High rebounds	High assists	Location Attendance	Series
1	10 March	@ Adelaide	L 104–97	Nathan Sobey (23)	Nathan Sobey (10)	Nathan Sobey (7)	Adelaide Entertainment Centre; 10,055	0–1
2	14 March	Adelaide	W 101–92	Nathan Sobey (41)	John Brown (7)	Owen Foxwell (7)	John Cain Arena; 5,600	1–1
3	17 March	@ Adelaide	L 108–96	Ian Clark (32)	John Brown (10)	Nathan Sobey (8)	Adelaide Entertainment Centre; 10,018	1–2

2026 finals schedule

== Transactions ==
Free agency began on 4 April 2025.

=== Re-signed ===
Player	Date Signed	Contract	Ref.
Malique Lewis	11 June 2025	1-year deal	

=== Additions ===
Player	Date Signed	Contract	Former team	Ref.
Akech Aliir	10 April 2025	1-year deal	Melbourne United	
Daniel Foster	29 April 2025	1-year deal	Nevada Wolf Pack	
D. J. Mitchell	15 May 2025	2-year deal (mutual option)	Manchester Basketball	
Gorjok Gak	17 May 2025	1-year deal	Tasmania JackJumpers	
Hunter Maldonado	5 August 2025	1-year deal	Riesen Ludwigsburg	
Wes Iwundu	10 October 2025	2-year deal	Promitheas Patras	
Ian Clark	27 December 2025	1-year deal	Cangrejeros de Santurce	

=== Subtractions ===
Player	Reason left	Date Left	New team	Ref.
Matt Kenyon	Free agent	15 May 2025	Adelaide 36ers	
Vrenz Bleijenbergh	Released	16 September 2025	Yukatel Merkezefendi	
Gorjok Gak	Parted ways	18 December 2025	Sichuan Blue Whales	
Hunter Maldonado	Released	27 December 2025	Brisbane Bullets	

== Awards ==
=== Club awards ===
- Club MVP: Nathan Sobey
- Fan Voted Player of the Year: John Brown
- The Locker Room Award: John Brown
- Defensive Player of the Year: John Brown
- Staff Member of the Year: Simon Wigg
- Heartland Crew Member of the Year: Tracey Helman
- Life Member Award: Tommy Greer
- Community Impact Award: Malique Lewis

== See also ==
- 2025–26 NBL season
- South East Melbourne Phoenix
