= 2025–26 Tasmania JackJumpers season =

Australian professional basketball season

- Head coach: (United States) Scott Roth
- Captain: (Australia) Will Magnay
- Arena: Derwent Entertainment Centre

NBL results
- Record: 14–19 (42.4%)
- Ladder: 6th
- Finals finish: Play-in finalist (lost to United 68–82)
- Stats at NBL.com.au

Ignite Cup results
- Record: 2–2 (50%)
- Ladder: 5th
- Ignite Cup finish: Did not qualify
- All statistics correct as of 5 March 2026.

The 2025–26 Tasmania JackJumpers season was the 5th season for the franchise in the National Basketball League (NBL).

== Roster ==
Note: Flags indicate national team eligibility at FIBA-sanctioned events. Players may hold other non-FIBA nationalities not displayed.

2025–26 Tasmania JackJumpers roster
Players
Coaches

Pos.	No.	Nat.	Name	Ht.	Wt.
G	0	(United States)	Hamilton, Bryce (injured) (I)	1.93 m (6 ft 4 in)	93 kg (205 lb)
G	2	(Australia)	Nunn, Brody (DP)	1.85 m (6 ft 1 in)	77 kg (170 lb)
G/F	3	(Australia)	Drmic, Anthony (VC)	1.98 m (6 ft 6 in)	91 kg (201 lb)
G	4	(Australia)	Stoddart, Nicholas (injured)	1.88 m (6 ft 2 in)
F	5	(South Sudan)	Deng, Majok	2.05 m (6 ft 9 in)	84 kg (185 lb)
G	7	(United States)	Johnson, David (I)	1.93 m (6 ft 4 in)	92 kg (203 lb)
G	10	(Australia)	Ayre, Ben (injured)	1.84 m (6 ft 0 in)	80 kg (176 lb)
F	11	(Australia)	Marshall, Nick	1.98 m (6 ft 6 in)	90 kg (198 lb)
G	12	(United States)	Campbell, Tyger (I & IRP)	1.80 m (5 ft 11 in)	80 kg (176 lb)
G	13	(Australia)	Macdonald, Sean (injured)	1.88 m (6 ft 2 in)	86 kg (190 lb)
F	14	(Australia)	Richards, Jacob (NRP)	2.00 m (6 ft 7 in)	99 kg (218 lb)
F	15	(Australia)	Woodhill, Archie (DP)	2.06 m (6 ft 9 in)	95 kg (209 lb)
C	22	(Australia)	Magnay, Will (injured) (C)	2.08 m (6 ft 10 in)	111 kg (245 lb)
F	33	(Australia)	Bannan, Josh	2.08 m (6 ft 10 in)	100 kg (220 lb)
G/F	76	(Australia)	Haywood, Ryley (IRP)	1.94 m (6 ft 4 in)
F	96	(Australia)	Williamson, Kobe (injured)	2.03 m (6 ft 8 in)	107 kg (236 lb)

Head coach

- (United States) Scott Roth

Assistant coach(es)

- (Australia) Nathan Brereton
- (Australia) Mark Radford
- (Australia) Jarrad Weeks

Team manager

- (Australia) Mark Chivers

Legend

- (C) Team captain
- (DP) Development player
- (IN) Inactive
- (I) Import player
- (TP) Training player
- (SRP) Special restricted player
- (IRP) Injury replacement player
- (NS) Next Star player
- Injured

- Roster
Updated: 18 February 2026

=== Depth chart ===
Pos.	Starting 5	Bench 1	Development	Injured
PG	Tyger Campbell (I)	Brody Nunn (DP)		Sean Macdonald (injured)
SG	David Johnson (I)	Anthony Drmic	Nicholas Stoddart (injured)	Ben Ayre (injured)
SF	Nick Marshall			Bryce Hamilton (I) (injured)
PF	Majok Deng	Jacob Richards (NRP)		Kobe Williamson (injured)
C	Josh Bannan	Archie Woodhill (DP)		Will Magnay (injured)

== Standings ==
=== Ladder ===
Pos	2025–26 NBL season											
Pos	Team	Pld	W	L	PCT	Last 5	Streak	Home	Away	PF	PA	PP
1	Sydney Kings	33	24	9	72.73%	5–0	W11	13–4	11–5	3276	2879	113.79%
2	Adelaide 36ers	33	23	10	69.70%	2–3	L1	12–5	11–5	3042	2890	105.26%
3	S.E. Melbourne Phoenix	33	22	11	66.67%	3–2	L1	11–5	11–6	3324	3061	108.59%
4	Perth Wildcats	33	21	12	63.64%	4–1	W1	10–7	11–5	2996	2840	105.49%
5	Melbourne United	33	20	13	60.61%	2–3	W1	11–6	9–7	3041	2905	104.68%
6	Tasmania JackJumpers	33	14	19	42.42%	2–3	L2	6–10	8–9	2873	2884	99.62%
7	New Zealand Breakers	33	13	20	39.39%	2–3	W1	7–9	6–11	3022	3058	98.82%
8	Illawarra Hawks	33	13	20	39.39%	3–2	W2	7–9	6–11	3074	3205	95.91%
9	Cairns Taipans	33	9	24	27.27%	1–4	L2	4–13	5–11	2754	3194	86.22%
10	Brisbane Bullets	33	6	27	18.18%	0–5	L13	2–14	4–13	2710	3196	84.79%

Updated to match(es) played on 20 February 2026. Source: NBL.com.au

The NBL tie-breaker system as outlined in the NBL Rules and Regulations states that in the case of an identical win–loss record, the overall points percentage will determine order of seeding.

=== Ladder progression ===
Leader and qualification to semifinals
Qualification to semifinals
Qualification to play-in
Last place

2025–26 NBL season
Team ╲ Round	1	2	3	4	5	6	7	8	9	10	11	12	13	14	15	16	17	18	19	20	21	22
Adelaide 36ers	—	2	1	2	2	3	3	3	2	2	1	1	1	1	1	1	1	1	1	1	2	2
Brisbane Bullets	3	7	8	9	7	7	7	7	8	8	9	9	9	9	9	10	10	10	10	10	10	10
Cairns Taipans	7	4	7	7	8	10	9	10	10	10	10	10	10	10	10	9	9	9	9	9	9	9
Illawarra Hawks	—	9	9	8	10	8	10	8	7	9	8	8	8	8	7	8	8	7	8	8	8	8
Melbourne United	2	1	2	1	1	1	1	1	1	1	2	2	3	2	3	4	4	4	4	5	5	5
New Zealand Breakers	6	10	10	10	9	9	8	9	9	7	6	7	7	7	8	7	7	8	7	7	7	7
Perth Wildcats	5	6	4	3	6	5	5	5	5	4	4	5	5	5	5	5	5	5	5	4	4	4
S.E. Melbourne Phoenix	1	5	6	4	3	2	2	2	3	3	3	3	2	4	2	2	2	2	3	3	3	3
Sydney Kings	—	8	5	6	5	6	4	4	4	5	5	4	4	3	4	3	3	3	2	2	1	1
Tasmania JackJumpers	4	3	3	5	4	4	6	6	6	6	7	6	6	6	6	6	6	6	6	6	6	6

Updated to match(es) played on 20 February 2026. Source: NBL.com.au

== Game log ==
=== Pre-season ===
The 2025 NBL Blitz will run from 27 to 31 August 2025 with games being played at the AIS Arena, Canberra.

2025 NBL Blitz game log
Total: 2–0 (Home: 1–0; Road: 1–0)
August: 2–0 (Home: 1–0; Road: 1–0)

Game	Date	Team	Score	High points	High rebounds	High assists	Location Attendance	Record
1	28 August	@ Cairns	W 95–97 (OT)	Bryce Hamilton (25)	Josh Bannan (11)	Tyger Campbell (8)	AIS Arena n/a	1–0
2	30 August	Adelaide	W 97–95	David Johnson (25)	Will Magnay (8)	Tyger Campbell (8)	AIS Arena n/a	2–0

=== Regular season ===
The regular season will begin on 18 September 2025. It will consist of 165 games (33 games each) spread across 22 rounds, with the final game being played on 20 February 2026.

2025–26 game log
Total: 14–19 (Home: 6–10; Road: 8–9)
September: 2–1 (Home: 0–1; Road: 2–0)

Game	Date	Team	Score	High points	High rebounds	High assists	Location Attendance	Record
1	18 September	Melbourne	L 84–88	Bryce Hamilton (24)	David Johnson (10)	Ayre, Campbell (4)	Derwent Entertainment Centre; 4,340	0–1
2	20 September	@ Perth	W 72–75	Bryce Hamilton (26)	Josh Bannan (10)	Bryce Hamilton (5)	Perth Arena; 11,701	1–1
3	27 September	@ Illawarra	W 86–91	Bryce Hamilton (21)	Will Magnay (8)	Tyger Campbell (4)	Wollongong Entertainment Centre; 5,123	2–1

October: 3–3 (Home: 1–1; Road: 2–2)

Game	Date	Team	Score	High points	High rebounds	High assists	Location Attendance	Record
4	4 October	@ Brisbane	W 82–84	Josh Bannan (23)	Josh Bannan (15)	Ayre, Campbell (3)	Brisbane Entertainment Centre; 6,946	3–1
5	9 October	@ Adelaide	L 98–89	Bryce Hamilton (22)	Magnay, Marshall (6)	Bryce Hamilton (9)	Adelaide Entertainment Centre; 9,320	3–2
6	15 October	Sydney	W 86–70	Tyger Campbell (21)	Josh Bannan (14)	Banna, Marshall (6)	Derwent Entertainment Centre; 4,139	4–2
7	17 October	@ New Zealand	L 82–65	Will Magnay (14)	Will Magnay (12)	Tyger Campbell (4)	Spark Arena; 3,212	4–3
8	26 October	@ Sydney	W 89–90	Bannan, Hamilton (18)	Josh Bannan (9)	Tyger Campbell (8)	Sydney SuperDome; 11,023	5–3
9	29 October	Perth	L 84–95	Bryce Hamilton (26)	Josh Bannan (8)	Tyger Campbell (7)	Derwent Entertainment Centre; 4,139	5–4

November: 1–5 (Home: 1–4; Road: 0–1)

Game	Date	Team	Score	High points	High rebounds	High assists	Location Attendance	Record
10	1 November	Cairns	L 69–75	Bryce Hamilton (21)	Josh Bannan (12)	Bryce Hamilton (6)	Silverdome; 3,255	5–5
11	6 November	S.E. Melbourne	L 102–103	Bryce Hamilton (36)	Josh Bannan (10)	Bryce Hamilton (5)	Silverdome; 3,255	5–6
12	8 November	Brisbane	L 81–83	Bannan, Marshall (18)	Josh Bannan (11)	Tyger Campbell (8)	Derwent Entertainment Centre; 4,340	5–7
13	13 November	Adelaide	L 86–97	Tyger Campbell (20)	Josh Bannan (14)	Ayre, Marshall (4)	Derwent Entertainment Centre; 4,340	5–8
14	21 November	@ Perth	L 101–95	Josh Bannan (29)	Majok Deng (11)	Bryce Hamilton (5)	Perth Arena; 10,930	5–9
15	23 November	Sydney	W 104–81	Bryce Hamilton (22)	Bannan, Marshall (8)	Bryce Hamilton (6)	Derwent Entertainment Centre; 4,340	6–9

December: 4–4 (Home: 1–2; Road: 3–2)

Game	Date	Team	Score	High points	High rebounds	High assists	Location Attendance	Record
16	6 December	@ New Zealand	L 99–86	Bryce Hamilton (21)	Bryce Hamilton (8)	Bryce Hamilton (6)	Spark Arena; 3,638	6–10
17	10 December	@ S.E. Melbourne	W 81–89	Bryce Hamilton (18)	Josh Bannan (12)	Josh Bannan (4)	Gippsland Indoor Stadium; 1,953	7–10
18	13 December	@ Cairns	W 68–81	Josh Bannan (20)	Bannan, Magnay (13)	Bryce Hamilton (7)	Cairns Convention Centre; 3,876	8–10
19	21 December	Perth	L 85–94	Bryce Hamilton (25)	Josh Bannan (9)	Bryce Hamilton (4)	Derwent Entertainment Centre; 4,340	8–11
20	23 December	@ Melbourne	W 73–92	Tyger Campbell (20)	Josh Bannan (12)	Bannan, Campbell (3)	John Cain Arena; 10,175	9–11
21	26 December	New Zealand	L 80–81 (OT)	Bryce Hamilton (23)	Nick Marshall (10)	three players (2)	Derwent Entertainment Centre; 4,340	9–12
22	29 December	S.E. Melbourne	W 87–84	Majok Deng (21)	Bannan, Deng (7)	Ben Ayre (5)	Derwent Entertainment Centre; 4,340	10–12
23	31 December	@ Illawarra	L 92–90	Josh Bannan (25)	Will Magnay (8)	Nick Marshall (4)	Wollongong Entertainment Centre; 5,359	10–13

January: 2–4 (Home: 1–1; Road: 1–3)

Game	Date	Team	Score	High points	High rebounds	High assists	Location Attendance	Record
24	3 January	Melbourne	W 84–75	Will Magnay (27)	Will Magnay (13)	Tyger Campbell (8)	Derwent Entertainment Centre; 4,340	11–13
25	9 January	Adelaide	W 72–80	Bryce Hamilton (16)	Josh Bannan (9)	Josh Bannan (3)	Adelaide Entertainment Centre; 10,041	12–13
26	17 January	@ Melbourne	L 79–77	Hamilton, Magnay (17)	Josh Bannan (12)	Will Magnay (4)	Perth Arena; 7,072	12–14
27	22 January	@ Sydney	L 105–94	David Johnson (23)	Josh Bannan (15)	Tyger Campbell (6)	Sydney SuperDome; 9,234	12–15
28	24 January	Illawarra	L 91–101	Josh Bannan (26)	Bannan, Johnson (8)	Nick Marshall (7)	Derwent Entertainment Centre; 4,340	12–16
29	30 January	@ Cairns	L 96–93 (OT)	Majok Deng (28)	Josh Bannan (15)	Tyger Campbell (6)	Cairns Convention Centre; 3,862	12–17

February: 2–2 (Home: 2–1; Road: 0–1)

Game	Date	Team	Score	High points	High rebounds	High assists	Location Attendance	Record
30	1 February	New Zealand	W 91–89	David Johnson (33)	Josh Bannan (11)	Tyger Campbell (9)	Derwent Entertainment Centre; 4,340	13–17
31	6 February	Brisbane	W 114–70	Nick Marshall (31)	Josh Bannan (9)	Deng, Johnson (5)	Derwent Entertainment Centre; 4,340	14–17
32	14 February	@ S.E. Melbourne	L 120–104	Majok Deng (36)	Josh Bannan (10)	Tyger Campbell (9)	John Cain Arena; 7,328	14–18
33	18 February	Illawarra	L 70–103	Bannan, Campbell (17)	David Johnson (6)	three players (2)	Derwent Entertainment Centre; 4,340	14–19

2025–26 season schedule

=== NBL Ignite Cup ===
The NBL introduced the new NBL Ignite Cup tournament for the 2025–26 season, with all games except the championship final counting towards the regular-season standings.

Pos	Team	Pld	W	L	PF	PA	PP	BP	Pts	Qualification
1	Adelaide 36ers	4	3	1	390	329	118.5	12	21	Ignite Cup final
2	New Zealand Breakers	4	3	1	441	385	114.5	11	20	Ignite Cup final
3	Perth Wildcats	4	3	1	399	365	109.3	9.5	18.5	
4	Melbourne United	4	2	2	390	359	108.6	9.5	15.5	
5	Tasmania JackJumpers	4	2	2	349	338	103.3	8.5	14.5	
6	S.E. Melbourne Phoenix	4	2	2	408	402	101.5	8	14	
7	Illawarra Hawks	4	2	2	372	397	93.7	7	13	
8	Brisbane Bullets	4	1	3	334	411	81.3	6	9	
9	Sydney Kings	4	1	3	350	381	91.9	5	8	
10	Cairns Taipans	4	1	3	340	406	83.7	3.5	6.5	

Updated to match(es) played on 28 January 2026. Source: Ignitecup.com.au

=== Postseason ===
2026 finals game log
Total: 0–1 (Home: 0–0; Road: 0–1)
Play-in qualifier: 0–1 (Home: 0–0; Road: 0–1)

Game	Date	Team	Score	High points	High rebounds	High assists	Location Attendance	Record
1	5 March	@ Melbourne	L 82–68	Nick Marshall (20)	Majok Deng (9)	Tyger Campbell (6)	John Cain Arena; 5,071	0–1

2026 finals schedule

== Transactions ==
Free agency began on 4 April 2025.

=== Re-signed ===
Player	Date Signed	Contract	Ref.
Brody Nunn	24 March 2025	1-year deal	
Nick Stoddart	29 May 2025	1-year deal	

=== Additions ===
Player	Date Signed	Contract	Former team	Ref.
Nick Marshall	8 April 2025	2-year deal	Adelaide 36ers	
Josh Bannan	11 April 2025	2-year deal	Brisbane Bullets	
Ben Ayre	16 April 2025	2-year deal (mutual option)	S.E. Melbourne Phoenix	
Kobe Williamson	21 May 2025	2-year deal	Seattle Redhawks	
David Johnson	27 May 2025	1-year deal	Memphis Hustle	
Bryce Hamilton	26 June 2025	1-year deal	Rostock Seawolves	
Tyger Campbell	5 August 2025	1-year deal	Rasta Vechta	
TJ Starks	3 October 2025	1-year deal (NRP)	BC Astana	

=== Subtractions ===
Player	Reason left	Date Left	New team	Ref.
Clint Steindl	Retired	13 February	n/a	
Ian Hummer	Free Agent	7 March 2025		
Reuben Te Rangi	Free agent	8 April 2025	New Zealand Breakers	
Fabijan Krslovic	Free agent	11 April 2025	Melbourne United	
Walter Brown	Released	6 May 2025	Canterbury Rams	
Gorjok Gak	Free agent	17 May 2025	S.E. Melbourne Phoenix	
Jordon Crawford	Free agent	25 May 2025	Esenler Erokspor	
Milton Doyle	Free agent	1 June 2025	Melbourne United	

== Awards ==
=== Club awards ===
- Club MVP: Josh Bannan
- Coaches Award: Nick Marshall
- Players Award: Nick Marshall
- Fan Favourite: Majok Deng
- Defensive Player: Will Magnay
- Spirit of the JackJumpers: Christine Finnegan

== See also ==
- 2025–26 NBL season
- Tasmania JackJumpers
