= Reuben Te Rangi =

New Zealand basketball player (born 1994)

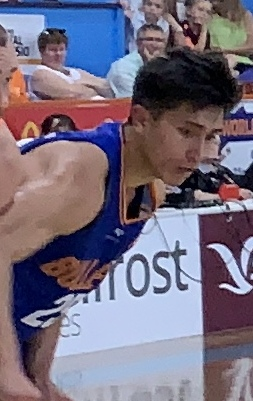
- Te Rangi with the Brisbane Bullets in 2019

No. 7 – New Zealand Breakers
- Position: Shooting guard / small forward
- League: NBL

Personal information
- Born: 14 October 1994 (age 32) Auckland, New Zealand
- Listed height: 198 cm (6 ft 6 in)
- Listed weight: 105 kg (231 lb)

Career information
- High school: Auckland Grammar School (Auckland, New Zealand)
- Playing career: 2012–present

Career history
- 2012: Harbour Heat
- 2012–2016: New Zealand Breakers
- 2013–2014: Southland Sharks
- 2015–2016: Super City Rangers
- 2016–2020: Brisbane Bullets
- 2017–2018: Southland Sharks
- 2019: Wellington Saints
- 2020: Canterbury Rams
- 2020–2024: South East Melbourne Phoenix
- 2021–2022: Knox Raiders
- 2023–2024: Auckland Tuatara
- 2024–2025: Tasmania JackJumpers
- 2025: Franklin Bulls
- 2025: Gold Coast Rollers
- 2025–present: New Zealand Breakers
- 2026: Tauranga Whai

Career highlights
- 2× NBL champion (2013, 2015); NBL Ignite Cup winner (2026); NBL Best Sixth Man (2019); NBL Most Improved Player (2019); 3× NZNBL champion (2013, 2018, 2019); NZNBL Finals MVP (2018); NZNBL All-Star Five (2026); NZNBL Rookie of the Year (2012); NBL1 North All Star First Team (2025)
Medals
Men's basketball
Representing New Zealand
Commonwealth Games
| Bronze medal – third place | 2018 Gold Coast |

Reuben Rangi-Ua Te Rangi (born 14 October 1994) is a New Zealand professional basketball player for the New Zealand Breakers of the Australian National Basketball League (NBL). He started his Australian NBL career in 2012 with the Breakers, with whom he won two championships in 2013 and 2015. Te Rangi joined the Brisbane Bullets in 2016 and won both the Best Sixth Man Award and Most Improved Player Award in 2019. He played four seasons with the South East Melbourne Phoenix before signing with the Tasmania JackJumpers in 2024. He returned to the Breakers in 2025.

Te Rangi is a regular New Zealand Tall Black and has played many seasons in the New Zealand National Basketball League (NZNBL).

== Early life ==
Te Rangi was born in Auckland, New Zealand, in the suburb of Ōtāhuhu. He was raised in Manurewa. He attended Auckland Grammar School and played junior basketball for Counties Manukau Basketball Association.

== Professional career ==
=== Australian NBL ===
Te Rangi made his debut in the Australian NBL during the 2012–13 season as a development player with the New Zealand Breakers. He was subsequently a member of the Breakers' championship-winning team. For the 2013–14 season, he was elevated to the Breakers' roster on a full-time contract. In March 2015, he won his second NBL championship when the Breakers defeated the Cairns Taipans in the NBL Grand Final. A year later, he helped the Breakers reach the 2016 NBL Grand Final series, where they were defeated by the Perth Wildcats.

In April 2016, Te Rangi joined the Brisbane Bullets. In February 2019, he was named the NBL's Best Sixth Man and Most Improved Player.

On 22 July 2020, Te Rangi signed a two-year deal with the South East Melbourne Phoenix. On 24 March 2022, he signed a two-year contract extension with the Phoenix. In January 2023, he played his 300th NBL game.

On 26 July 2024, Te Rangi signed with the Tasmania JackJumpers for the 2024–25 NBL season. In January 2025, he played his 350th NBL game.

On 8 April 2025, Te Rangi signed a two-year deal with the New Zealand Breakers, returning to the club for a second stint. In the 2025–26 NBL season, the Breakers finished outside the finals spots in seventh at the end of the regular season but won the inaugural NBL Ignite Cup Final, defeating the Adelaide 36ers 111–107 behind Te Rangi's 17 points and eight rebounds.

In October 2026, Te Rangi played his 400th NBL game, becoming just the 55th player in league history to achieve the feat.

=== New Zealand NBL ===
Te Rangi made his debut in the New Zealand NBL in 2012 with the Harbour Heat and subsequently won the Rookie of the Year award.

In 2013, Te Rangi joined the Southland Sharks and helped them win the championship. He returned to the Sharks in 2014 but was cut mid-season following an off-court incident in New Plymouth.

For the 2015 season, Te Rangi joined the Super City Rangers. He returned to the Rangers in 2016 and helped them reach the NBL final, where they lost to the Wellington Saints.

For the 2017 season, Te Rangi was welcomed back to the Southland Sharks. He helped the Sharks reach the NBL final, where they lost to the Wellington Saints. In 2018, Te Rangi helped the Sharks avenge their defeat to the Saints by beating them in the final behind his Finals MVP performance.

For the 2019 season, Te Rangi joined the Wellington Saints. He went on to play in his fourth straight NBL final, where he won his third NBL championship. He played for the Canterbury Rams in 2020 and the Auckland Tuatara in 2023. He re-joined the Tuatara in 2024. He joined the Franklin Bulls for the 2025 season.

Te Rangi joined the Tauranga Whai for the 2026 New Zealand NBL season. He was named NZNBL All-Star Five.

=== NBL1 ===
On 11 March 2021, Te Rangi signed with the Knox Raiders of the NBL1 South for the 2021 season. He re-joined the Raiders for the 2022 NBL1 South season.

In April 2025, Te Rangi signed with the Gold Coast Rollers of the NBL1 North for the 2025 season. He was named NBL1 North All Star First Team.

== National team career ==
In 2012, Te Rangi played for the Junior Tall Blacks at the FIBA Oceania Under-18 Championship and the Albert Schweitzer Tournament. He made his debut for the Tall Blacks in 2013 and played at the FIBA Oceania Championships in the same year. He went on to play at the 2015 FIBA Oceania Championship. He captained the Tall Blacks at the 2017 Asia Cup in Lebanon, and in 2018, he was a member of the bronze medal winning team at the Commonwealth Games. He played during the 2019 FIBA World Cup Asia Qualifiers, but missed the World Cup due to injury.

In July 2023, Te Rangi was named in the Tall Blacks squad for the 2023 FIBA World Cup.

In May 2025, Te Rangi was named in the Tall Blacks squad for a trans-Tasman series against Australia.

In February 2026, Te Rangi was named in the Tall Blacks squad for the second window of the FIBA Basketball World Cup 2027 Asian Qualifiers. In June 2026, he was named in the squad for two more Asian qualifiers. In August 2026, he was named in the Tall Blacks squad for the next Asian qualifier window. In November 2026, he was named in the squad for two more Asian qualifiers.

== Personal ==
Te Rangi is the son of Alex and Piloma, and he has two siblings, sister Aerin and brother Dante.
