= Malique Lewis =

Trinidadian basketball player (born 2004)

No. 33 – Cairns Taipans
- Position: Small forward
- League: NBL

Personal information
- Born: 10 November 2004 (age 22) San Fernando, Trinidad and Tobago
- Listed height: 202 cm (6 ft 8 in)
- Listed weight: 99 kg (218 lb)

Career information
- High school: Pleasantville (San Fernando, Trinidad and Tobago)
- NBA draft: 2026: 2nd round, 60th overall pick
- Drafted by: Washington Wizards
- Playing career: 2021–present

Career history
- 2021–2023: Fuenlabrada
- 2023–2024: Mexico City Capitanes
- 2024–2026: South East Melbourne Phoenix
- 2026–present: Cairns Taipans
- Stats at NBA.com
- Stats at Basketball Reference

Malique Lewis (born 10 November 2004) is a Trinidadian professional basketball player for the Cairns Taipans of the Australian National Basketball League (NBL). After playing in Spain and the NBA G League between 2021 and 2024, he played in the NBL as a Next Star with the South East Melbourne Phoenix between 2024 and 2026. In the 2026 NBA draft, Lewis was selected with the 60th final overall pick by the Washington Wizards, and traded to the Milwaukee Bucks. He later returned to the NBL and joined the Taipans for the 2026–27 season.

== Early life ==
Lewis was born in Trinidad and Tobago. His hometown is San Fernando. He grew up playing football. Lewis started to play basketball while he attended Pleasantville Secondary School in San Fernando.

== Professional career ==
=== Fuenlabrada (2021–2023) ===
As a 16-year-old, Lewis moved to Spain to play for Fuenlabrada in the Liga ACB, where he went up from 2.3 minutes in three appearances during the 2021–22 season to 19 games in 2022–23 for almost 18 minutes per game and 4.8 points and 3.5 rebounds. In May 2023, he produced the fourth-highest-scoring game in ACB history by a player aged 18 or younger with 24 points against Obradoiro.

=== Mexico City Capitanes (2023–2024) ===
Lewis joined the Mexico City Capitanes of the NBA G League for the 2023–24 season, where he played in 50 games and averaged 8.3 points and 5.8 rebounds in over 25 minutes per game.

=== South East Melbourne Phoenix (2024–2026) ===
In July 2024, Lewis signed with the South East Melbourne Phoenix of the Australian National Basketball League (NBL) as part of the league's Next Stars program. He became an important piece for the Phoenix over the course of the 2024–25 season, becoming one of the premier defenders on the team. He scored a season-high 15 points in November 2024, and for the season averaged 6.8 points, 4.1 rebounds and 1.0 assists per game.

In April 2025, Lewis declared for the 2025 NBA draft. On 11 June 2025, he withdrew his name from the draft and subsequently returned to the South East Melbourne Phoenix for the 2025–26 NBL season. On 6 November 2025, he scored a career-high 23 points in a 103–102 win over the Tasmania JackJumpers. Later that month, he began suffering from pneumothorax, a condition that the affects lungs. He missed a month of action due to pneumothorax and a hamstring injury.

On June 24, 2026, Lewis was selected by the Washington Wizards with the 60th overall and final pick in the 2026 NBA draft. He was then immediately traded to the Milwaukee Bucks.

=== Cairns Taipans (2026–present) ===
On 25 August 2026, Lewis signed with the Cairns Taipans on a two-year deal, with the second year being a club option, returning to the NBL for a second stint.
