= Ben Henshall =

Australian basketball player (born 2004)

No. 10 – Ole Miss Rebels
- Position: Shooting guard / point guard
- League: Southeastern Conference

Personal information
- Born: 22 June 2004 (age 22) Western Australia, Australia
- Listed height: 1.98 m (6 ft 6 in)
- Listed weight: 91 kg (200 lb)

Career information
- High school: Willetton Senior (Perth, Western Australia)
- College: Ole Miss (2026–present)
- Playing career: 2021–present

Career history
- 2021: Cockburn Cougars
- 2022–2023: BA Centre of Excellence
- 2023–2026: Perth Wildcats
- 2024: Otago Nuggets
Medals
Men's basketball
Representing Australia
FIBA Asia Cup
Gold medal – first place	2025 Saudi Arabia

Ben Henshall (born 22 June 2004) is an Australian college basketball player for the Ole Miss Rebels of the Southeastern Conference. After playing for the BA Centre of Excellence in the NBL1, he joined the Perth Wildcats of the National Basketball League (NBL) in 2023, where he played three seasons. In 2026, he opted to turn to the college pathway in the U.S. and joined Ole Miss.

== Early life and career ==
Henshall was born and raised in Western Australia. He grew up in the Perth suburb of Lynwood and initially played soccer and football. He started to take basketball seriously at age 14 while attending Willetton Senior High School.

In 2021, Henshall led the Western Australia Under 18 Metro team to the gold medal at the national championships and was named the Western Australian Basketball League (WABL) Player of the Year while playing for the Cockburn Cougars. He also debuted for the Cougars in the NBL1 West during the 2021 season, averaging 6.17 points, 2.67 rebounds and 1.58 assists in 12 games.

In 2022, Henshall moved to Canberra to attend the Australian Institute of Sport (AIS). He played for the BA Centre of Excellence in the NBL1 during the 2022 season and averaged 8.0 points, 2.24 rebounds and 1.65 assists in 17 games in the Wildcard conference.

In 2023, Henshall led the Western Australia Under 20 team to the gold medal at the national championships and won the Bob Staunton Medal as the most outstanding player of the tournament. He also helped the NBA Global Academy win the NBA Academy Games in the United States, averaging a series-best 16.83 points per game. With the BA Centre of Excellence in the NBL1 East during the 2023 NBL1 season, he captained the team to a 20–2 record and averaged 18.05 points, 3.57 rebounds, 5.0 assists and 1.86 steals in 21 games.

== Professional career ==
On 17 April 2023, Henshall signed a two-year deal with the Perth Wildcats of the National Basketball League (NBL). In his NBL debut on 1 October 2023, he scored a game-high 24 points in a 110–99 loss to the South East Melbourne Phoenix. He became the first Australian to top score on debut in the NBL and joined Joe Ingles as the only player under the age of 20 to score 20 points on debut. He lacked further opportunities over the rest of the season however, and didn't have another double-figure game. He appeared in 16 games for the Wildcats in the 2023–24 season, averaging 3.1 points and 1.3 rebounds per game.

Henshall joined the Otago Nuggets of the New Zealand National Basketball League (NZNBL) for the 2024 season. On 5 May, he recorded 31 points and 10 rebounds in a 107–94 win over the Nelson Giants. He had two more 31-point games. In 15 games, he averaged 19.9 points, 6.9 rebounds, 4.2 assists and 1.5 steals per game.

Early in the 2024–25 NBL season, Henshall seized his chances and earned a spot in the Wildcats' starting five. After missing all 10 of his field goal attempts on 25 October against the Sydney Kings, Henshall responded a week later with a career-high 26 points and five 3-pointers in a 113–105 win over the Illawarra Hawks. In 32 games, he averaged 9.4 points, 3.4 rebounds, 2.6 assists and 1.0 steals per game.

In April 2025, Henshall moved to the United States to begin his campaign to get selected in the 2025 NBA draft. At the end of the month, he officially declared for the draft, but later withdrew his name in June.

On 1 August 2025, Henshall re-signed with the Wildcats on a two-year deal. Early in the 2025–26 NBL season, he was moved to a bench role. He returned to the starting line-up mid-season after import David Duke Jr. sustained an injury, and began focusing on becoming a defensive star. His move to the point guard role saw him produce career-best numbers. He finished the season averaging 8.9 points, 3.5 rebounds and 2.9 assists while shooting 43 per cent from the field.

Following the 2025–26 NBL season, Henshall began pursuing U.S. college eligibility.

== College career ==
On 7 July 2026, Henshall signed with the Ole Miss Rebels of the Southeastern Conference in the NCAA Division I.

== National team ==
In February 2023, Henshall joined the Australian Boomers as a training player ahead of two FIBA World Cup qualifiers. He re-joined the Boomers as a member of the 12-man squad twelve months later.

In November 2024, Henshall joined the Boomers for the 2025 FIBA Asia Cup qualifiers. In July 2025, he was named in the Boomers squad in the lead up to the 2025 FIBA Asia Cup in Saudi Arabia. In six games at the 2025 FIBA Asia Cup, he averaged 3.2 points and 1.8 rebounds per game.

In June 2026, Henshall was named in the Boomers squad for the next window of the FIBA Basketball World Cup 2027 Asian Qualifiers in Perth in July. He later withdrew from the team.

== Personal life ==
Henshall is the son of Mark and Joanne.
