= 2025–26 Melbourne United season =

Australian professional basketball season

- Head coach: (Australia) Dean Vickerman
- Captain: (Australia) Chris Goulding
- Arena: John Cain Arena

NBL results
- Record: 20–13 (60.6%)
- Ladder: 5th
- Finals finish: Play-in finalist (lost to Wildcats 77–95)
- Stats at NBL.com.au

Ignite Cup results
- Record: 2–2 (50%)
- Ladder: 4th
- Ignite Cup finish: Did not qualify
- All statistics correct as of 7 March 2026.

The 2025–26 Melbourne United season was the 43rd season of the franchise in the National Basketball League (NBL), and their 12th under the banner of Melbourne United.

== Roster ==
Note: Flags indicate national team eligibility at FIBA-sanctioned events. Players may hold other non-FIBA nationalities not displayed.

2025–26 Melbourne United roster
Players
Coaches

Pos.	No.	Nat.	Name	Ht.	Wt.
G	2	(United States)	Walker, Tyson (I)	1.85 m (6 ft 1 in)	84 kg (185 lb)
G	3	(Australia)	Blogg, Campbell (DP)	1.94 m (6 ft 4 in)	88 kg (194 lb)
G	4	(Australia)	Daniels, Dash (NS)	1.96 m (6 ft 5 in)	90 kg (198 lb)
F	7	(New Zealand)	Delany, Finn	2.00 m (6 ft 7 in)	106 kg (234 lb)
G	9	(South Sudan)	Machar, Malith	1.98 m (6 ft 6 in)	77 kg (170 lb)
G	12	(Australia)	Wilson, Tom	1.94 m (6 ft 4 in)	77 kg (170 lb)
G	13	(Australia)	Krebs, Tanner	1.98 m (6 ft 6 in)	95 kg (209 lb)
C	14	(Netherlands)	Edwards, Jesse (I)	2.13 m (7 ft 0 in)	107 kg (236 lb)
F	15	(Australia)	Bowen, Kyle (VC)	2.04 m (6 ft 8 in)	101 kg (223 lb)
F	18	(Australia)	Krslovic, Fabijan	2.03 m (6 ft 8 in)	106 kg (234 lb)
C	22	(Australia)	Tata, Nicolas (NRP)	2.08 m (6 ft 10 in)	118 kg (260 lb)
F	30	(Australia)	Koppens, Tom (DP)	2.01 m (6 ft 7 in)	84 kg (185 lb)
C	32	(Australia)	Sewell, Henry (DP)	2.04 m (6 ft 8 in)
G	35	(United States)	Doyle, Milton (I)	1.93 m (6 ft 4 in)	86 kg (190 lb)
G	43	(Australia)	Goulding, Chris (C)	1.92 m (6 ft 4 in)	92 kg (203 lb)
G	51	(New Zealand)	Ili, Shea (VC)	1.84 m (6 ft 0 in)	88 kg (194 lb)

Head coach

- (Australia) Dean Vickerman

Assistant coach(es)

- (Australia) David Barlow
- (Australia) Rhys Carter
- (Australia) Jack Fleming

Team manager

- (Australia) Stephan Semerci

Legend

- (C) Team captain
- (DP) Development player
- (IN) Inactive
- (I) Import player
- (TP) Training player
- (NRP) Nominated replacement player
- (NS) Next Star player
- Injured

- Roster
Updated: 30 January 2026

=== Depth chart ===
Pos.	Starting 5	Bench 1	Bench 2	Development
PG	Tyson Walker (I)	Shea Ili	Dash Daniels (NS)	Campbell Blogg (DP)
SG	Chris Goulding	Tanner Krebs	Tom Wilson
SF	Milton Doyle (I)	Malith Machar	Tom Koppens (DP)
PF	Finn Delany	Kyle Bowen		Nicolas Tata (NRP)
C	Jesse Edwards (I)	Fabijan Krslovic		Henry Sewell (DP)

== Standings ==
=== Ladder ===
Pos	2025–26 NBL season											
Pos	Team	Pld	W	L	PCT	Last 5	Streak	Home	Away	PF	PA	PP
1	Sydney Kings	33	24	9	72.73%	5–0	W11	13–4	11–5	3276	2879	113.79%
2	Adelaide 36ers	33	23	10	69.70%	2–3	L1	12–5	11–5	3042	2890	105.26%
3	S.E. Melbourne Phoenix	33	22	11	66.67%	3–2	L1	11–5	11–6	3324	3061	108.59%
4	Perth Wildcats	33	21	12	63.64%	4–1	W1	10–7	11–5	2996	2840	105.49%
5	Melbourne United	33	20	13	60.61%	2–3	W1	11–6	9–7	3041	2905	104.68%
6	Tasmania JackJumpers	33	14	19	42.42%	2–3	L2	6–10	8–9	2873	2884	99.62%
7	New Zealand Breakers	33	13	20	39.39%	2–3	W1	7–9	6–11	3022	3058	98.82%
8	Illawarra Hawks	33	13	20	39.39%	3–2	W2	7–9	6–11	3074	3205	95.91%
9	Cairns Taipans	33	9	24	27.27%	1–4	L2	4–13	5–11	2754	3194	86.22%
10	Brisbane Bullets	33	6	27	18.18%	0–5	L13	2–14	4–13	2710	3196	84.79%

Updated to match(es) played on 20 February 2026. Source: NBL.com.au

The NBL tie-breaker system as outlined in the NBL Rules and Regulations states that in the case of an identical win–loss record, the overall points percentage will determine order of seeding.

=== Ladder progression ===
Leader and qualification to semifinals
Qualification to semifinals
Qualification to play-in
Last place

2025–26 NBL season
Team ╲ Round	1	2	3	4	5	6	7	8	9	10	11	12	13	14	15	16	17	18	19	20	21	22
Adelaide 36ers	—	2	1	2	2	3	3	3	2	2	1	1	1	1	1	1	1	1	1	1	2	2
Brisbane Bullets	3	7	8	9	7	7	7	7	8	8	9	9	9	9	9	10	10	10	10	10	10	10
Cairns Taipans	7	4	7	7	8	10	9	10	10	10	10	10	10	10	10	9	9	9	9	9	9	9
Illawarra Hawks	—	9	9	8	10	8	10	8	7	9	8	8	8	8	7	8	8	7	8	8	8	8
Melbourne United	2	1	2	1	1	1	1	1	1	1	2	2	3	2	3	4	4	4	4	5	5	5
New Zealand Breakers	6	10	10	10	9	9	8	9	9	7	6	7	7	7	8	7	7	8	7	7	7	7
Perth Wildcats	5	6	4	3	6	5	5	5	5	4	4	5	5	5	5	5	5	5	5	4	4	4
S.E. Melbourne Phoenix	1	5	6	4	3	2	2	2	3	3	3	3	2	4	2	2	2	2	3	3	3	3
Sydney Kings	—	8	5	6	5	6	4	4	4	5	5	4	4	3	4	3	3	3	2	2	1	1
Tasmania JackJumpers	4	3	3	5	4	4	6	6	6	6	7	6	6	6	6	6	6	6	6	6	6	6

Updated to match(es) played on 20 February 2026. Source: NBL.com.au

== Game log ==
=== Pre-season ===
The 2025 NBL Blitz will run from 27 to 31 August 2025 with games being played at the AIS Arena, Canberra.

2025 NBL Blitz game log
Total: 1–1 (Home: 1–0; Road: 0–1)
August: 1–1 (Home: 1–0; Road: 0–1)

Game	Date	Team	Score	High points	High rebounds	High assists	Location Attendance	Record
1	27 August	@ Perth	L 84–78	Milton Doyle (15)	Jesse Edwards (9)	Milton Doyle (3)	AIS Arena n/a	0–1
2	30 August	Brisbane	W 98–60	Tyson Walker (18)	Jesse Edwards (11)	Tyson Walker (6)	AIS Arena n/a	1–1

=== NBLxNBA games ===
2025 pre-season game log
Total: 0–1 (Home: 0–0; Road: 0–1)
October: 0–1 (Home: 0–0; Road: 0–1)

Game	Date	Team	Score	High points	High rebounds	High assists	Location Attendance	Record
1	3 October	@ New Orleans	L 97–107	Milton Doyle (25)	Finn Delany (9)	Tyson Walker (5)	Rod Laver Arena; 14,800	0–1

=== Regular season ===
The regular season will begin on 18 September 2025. It will consist of 165 games (33 games each) spread across 22 rounds, with the final game being played on 20 February 2026.

2025–26 game log
Total: 20–13 (Home: 11–6; Road: 9–7)
September: 3–0 (Home: 2–0; Road: 1–0)

Game	Date	Team	Score	High points	High rebounds	High assists	Location Attendance	Record
1	18 September	@ Tasmania	W 84–88	Milton Doyle (22)	Fabijan Krslovic (10)	three players (3)	Derwent Entertainment Centre; 4,340	1–0
2	21 September	New Zealand	W 114–82	Jesse Edwards (22)	Fabijan Krslovic (8)	Shea Ili (8)	John Cain Arena; 9,101	2–0
3	25 September	S.E. Melbourne	W 103–83	Milton Doyle (18)	Jesse Edwards (6)	Tyson Walker (8)	John Cain Arena; 10,035	3–0

October: 6–0 (Home: 3–0; Road: 3–0)

Game	Date	Team	Score	High points	High rebounds	High assists	Location Attendance	Record
4	8 October	@ Sydney	W 93–107	Tyson Walker (27)	Jesse Edwards (12)	Milton Doyle (6)	Sydney SuperDome; 9,528	4–0
5	12 October	Cairns	W 95–60	Edwards, Goulding (16)	Jesse Edwards (12)	Finn Delany (4)	John Cain Arena; 9,233	5–0
6	17 October	@ Brisbane	W 86–95	Chris Goulding (22)	Jesse Edwards (7)	Tyson Walker (6)	Brisbane Entertainment Centre; 4,899	6–0
7	19 October	New Zealand	W 104–88	Chris Goulding (23)	Jesse Edwards (10)	Tyson Walker (9)	John Cain Arena; 8,092	7–0
8	24 October	@ Cairns	W 67–94	Chris Goulding (14)	Delany, Doyle (6)	Doyle, Walker (4)	Cairns Convention Centre; 3,505	8–0
9	26 October	Adelaide	W 81–80	Jesse Edwards (25)	Fabijan Krslovic (8)	Milton Doyle (5)	John Cain Arena; 10,175	9–0

November: 4–2 (Home: 2–1; Road: 2–1)

Game	Date	Team	Score	High points	High rebounds	High assists	Location Attendance	Record
10	3 November	Sydney	L 92–95	Tyson Walker (22)	Tyson Walker (9)	Tyson Walker (5)	John Cain Arena; 10,175	9–1
11	5 November	@ Illawarra	L 107–93	Finn Delany (21)	Edwards, Krslovic (6)	Milton Doyle (11)	Wollongong Entertainment Centre; 3,012	9–2
12	8 November	@ S.E. Melbourne	W 81–92	Tyson Walker (24)	Jesse Edwards (11)	Tyson Walker (6)	John Cain Arena; 8,806	10–2
13	15 November	Brisbane	W 99–93	Milton Doyle (28)	Kyle Bowen (7)	Doyle, Ili (4)	John Cain Arena; 8,930	11–2
14	21 November	@ Illawarra	W 102–105	Chris Goulding (23)	Jesse Edwards (8)	Milton Doyle (7)	Wollongong Entertainment Centre; 3,872	12–2
15	23 November	Perth	W 98–87	Milton Doyle (24)	Jesse Edwards (16)	Tyson Walker (7)	John Cain Arena; 9,212	13–2

December: 2–5 (Home: 1–2; Road: 1–3)

Game	Date	Team	Score	High points	High rebounds	High assists	Location Attendance	Record
16	4 December	@ Perth	L 96–84	Tanner Krebs (29)	Jesse Edwards (9)	Tyson Walker (5)	Perth Arena; 10,210	13–3
17	7 December	@ S.E. Melbourne	L 111–86	Milton Doyle (22)	Finn Delany (7)	Doyle, Walker (5)	John Cain Arena; 10,175	13–4
18	12 December	@ Adelaide	L 114–105 (OT)	Chris Goulding (24)	Delany, Edwards (9)	Doyle, Ili (3)	Adelaide Entertainment Centre; 10,032	13–5
19	14 December	Sydney	L 86–92 (OT)	Milton Doyle (21)	Fabijan Krslovic (12)	Tyson Walker (5)	John Cain Arena; 9,402	13–6
20	18 December	Illawarra	W 97–75	Tyson Walker (21)	Jesse Edwards (9)	Tyson Walker (10)	John Cain Arena; 7,205	14–6
21	23 December	Tasmania	L 73–92	Tyson Walker (15)	Tanner Krebs (5)	Tyson Walker (6)	John Cain Arena; 10,175	14–7
22	27 December	@ Brisbane	W 87–92	Chris Goulding (19)	Kyle Bowen (8)	Milton Doyle (8)	Brisbane Entertainment Centre; 4,299	15–7

January: 3–4 (Home: 2–1; Road: 1–3)

Game	Date	Team	Score	High points	High rebounds	High assists	Location Attendance	Record
23	3 January	@ Tasmania	L 84–75	Tyson Walker (20)	Jesse Edwards (9)	Milton Doyle (6)	Derwent Entertainment Centre; 4,340	15–8
24	7 January	Cairns	L 92–93	Chris Goulding (27)	Tanner Krebs (8)	Delany, Walker (4)	Bendigo Stadium; 4,003	15–9
25	11 January	@ Sydney	L 97–94	Jesse Edwards (23)	Tanner Krebs (9)	Milton Doyle (8)	Sydney SuperDome; 12,634	15–10
26	17 January	Tasmania	W 79–77	Jesse Edwards (21)	Jesse Edwards (10)	Tyson Walker (6)	Perth Arena; 7,032	16–10
27	21 January	Brisbane	W 98–66	Tyson Walker (17)	Fabijan Krslovic (8)	Tyson Walker (5)	Bendigo Stadium; 3,978	17–10
28	25 January	@ Perth	W 73–74	Milton Doyle (24)	Jesse Edwards (17)	Milton Doyle (8)	Perth Arena; 12,707	18–10
29	30 January	@ New Zealand	L 97–95	Jesse Edwards (23)	Jesse Edwards (14)	Milton Doyle (9)	Spark Arena; 4,917	18–11

February: 2–2 (Home: 1–2; Road: 1–0)

Game	Date	Team	Score	High points	High rebounds	High assists	Location Attendance	Record
30	7 February	Adelaide	L 76–87	Chris Goulding (18)	Jesse Edwards (8)	Tyson Walker (4)	John Cain Arena; 10,175	18–12
31	12 February	@ Cairns	W 85–89	Milton Doyle (25)	Jesse Edwards (13)	Fabijan Krslovic (5)	Cairns Convention Centre; 3,650	19–12
32	15 February	Illawarra	L 91–100	Tyson Walker (30)	Jesse Edwards (9)	Milton Doyle (6)	John Cain Arena; 10,175	19–13
33	19 February	S.E. Melbourne	W 95–91	Milton Doyle (25)	Jesse Edwards (11)	Tyson Walker (5)	John Cain Arena; 8,919	20–13

2025–26 season schedule

=== NBL Ignite Cup ===
The NBL introduced the new NBL Ignite Cup tournament for the 2025–26 season, with all games except the championship final counting towards the regular-season standings.

Pos	Team	Pld	W	L	PF	PA	PP	BP	Pts	Qualification
1	Adelaide 36ers	4	3	1	390	329	118.5	12	21	Ignite Cup final
2	New Zealand Breakers	4	3	1	441	385	114.5	11	20	Ignite Cup final
3	Perth Wildcats	4	3	1	399	365	109.3	9.5	18.5	
4	Melbourne United	4	2	2	390	359	108.6	9.5	15.5	
5	Tasmania JackJumpers	4	2	2	349	338	103.3	8.5	14.5	
6	S.E. Melbourne Phoenix	4	2	2	408	402	101.5	8	14	
7	Illawarra Hawks	4	2	2	372	397	93.7	7	13	
8	Brisbane Bullets	4	1	3	334	411	81.3	6	9	
9	Sydney Kings	4	1	3	350	381	91.9	5	8	
10	Cairns Taipans	4	1	3	340	406	83.7	3.5	6.5	

Updated to match(es) played on 28 January 2026. Source: Ignitecup.com.au

=== Postseason ===
2026 finals game log
Total: 1–1 (Home: 1–0; Road: 0–1)
Play-in qualifier: 1–0 (Home: 1–0; Road: 0–0)

Game	Date	Team	Score	High points	High rebounds	High assists	Location Attendance	Record
1	5 March	Tasmania	W 82–68	Finn Delany (33)	Fabijan Krslovic (7)	Doyle, Walker (6)	John Cain Arena; 5,071	1–0

Play-in game: 0–1 (Home: 0–0; Road: 0–1)

Game	Date	Team	Score	High points	High rebounds	High assists	Location Attendance	Record
2	7 March	@ Perth	L 95–77	Milton Doyle (13)	Jesse Edwards (8)	Finn Delany (3)	Perth Arena; 6,731	1–1

2026 finals schedule

== Transactions ==
Free agency began on 4 April 2025.

=== Re-signed ===
Player	Date Signed	Contract	Ref.
Kyle Bowen	4 April 2025	2-year deal	
Shea Ili	7 April 2025	2-year deal	

=== Additions ===
Player	Date Signed	Contract	Former team	Ref.
Dash Daniels	13 December 2024	2-year deal (next star)	BA Centre of Excellence	
Fabijan Krslovic	11 April 2025	2-year deal	Tasmania JackJumpers	
Tom Wilson	14 April 2025	1-year deal	Melbourne Tigers	
Finn Delany	22 May 2025	2-year deal (mutual option)	Utsunomiya Brex	
Tyson Walker	30 June 2025	1-year deal	Texas Legends	
Jesse Edwards	12 August 2025	1-year deal	Iowa Wolves	

=== Subtractions ===
Player	Reason left	Date Left	New Team	Ref.
Flynn Cameron	Free agent	9 April 2025	Adelaide 36ers	
Akech Aliir	Free agent	10 April 2025	S.E. Melbourne Phoenix	
Robert Loe	Free agent	15 April 2025	New Zealand Breakers	

== Awards ==
=== Club awards ===
- Club MVP: Jesse Edwards
- Defensive Player: Tyson Walker
- SHARE Award: Fabijan Krslovic
- Melbourne United Belt: Kyle Bowen
- Bringing the Blue Podcast MVP: Tyson Walker
- Vince Crivelli Club Person of the Year: Suzanne Jenkins & Lochie Gay

== See also ==
- 2025–26 NBL season
- Melbourne United
