= John Brown (basketball, born 1992) =

American basketball player

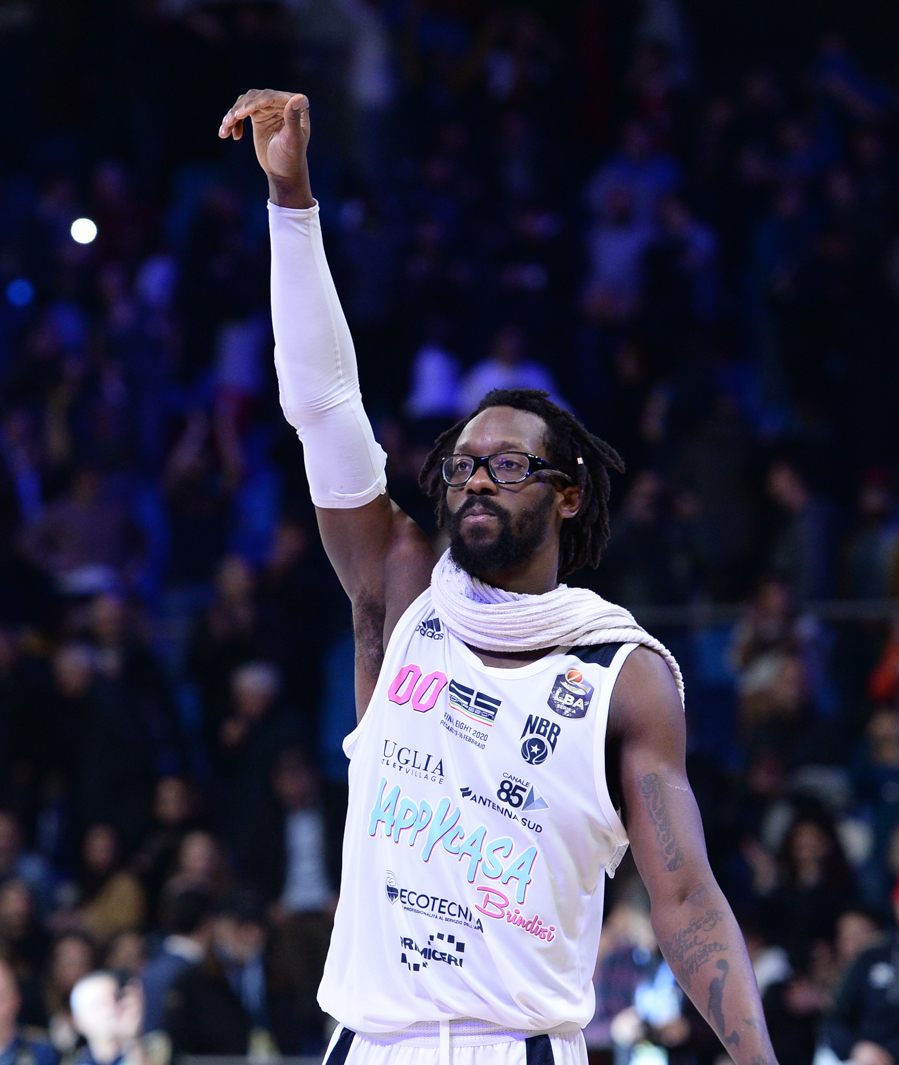
- Brown with Brindisi in 2020

No. 00 – Maxima Roma
- Position: Power forward
- League: LBA; EuroCup

Personal information
- Born: January 28, 1992 (age 34) Jacksonville, Florida, U.S.
- Listed height: 203 cm (6 ft 8 in)
- Listed weight: 98 kg (216 lb)

Career information
- High school: Arlington Country Day School (Jacksonville, Florida); Body of Christ Christian Academy (Raleigh, North Carolina); Oldsmar Christian School (Oldsmar, Florida)
- College: High Point (2012–2016)
- NBA draft: 2016: undrafted
- Playing career: 2016–present

Career history
- 2016–2017: Virtus Roma
- 2017–2018: Universo Treviso
- 2018–2020: Brindisi
- 2020–2022: UNICS Kazan
- 2022: Pallacanestro Brescia
- 2022–2024: AS Monaco
- 2024–2025: Crvena zvezda
- 2025–2026: South East Melbourne Phoenix
- 2026: Santeros de Aguada
- 2026–present: Maxima Roma

Career highlights
- All-NBL First Team (2026); NBL Best Defensive Player (2026); EuroLeague steals leader (2022); All-EuroCup Second Team (2021); 2× French League champion (2023, 2024); French Cup winner (2023); French League Best Defender (2024); VTB United League Defensive Player of the Year (2021); LBA steals leader (2020); 2× AP Honorable Mention All-American (2014, 2016); 2× Big South Player of the Year (2014, 2016); 4× First-team All-Big South (2013–2016); Big South Defensive Player of the Year (2016); Big South Freshman of the Year (2013)

John Edward Brown III (born January 28, 1992) is an American professional basketball player for Maxima Roma of the Lega Basket Serie A (LBA) and the EuroCup. He played college basketball for the High Point Panthers and was a two-time winner of the Big South Player of the Year in 2014 and 2016. Since graduating college, he has played in France, Italy, Russia and Australia.

== Early life ==
Brown was born in Jacksonville, Florida. He grew up very poor in government housing in Jacksonville, moving through various one-bedroom apartments with his mother, his grandmother and his little brother. As a junior in high school, his mother gave birth to his younger brother, Ja'Ron. He subsequently became a stand-in father for his brother.

== High school career ==
Brown attended three different high schools in Jacksonville, including Andrew Jackson High School, First Coast High School and Arlington Country Day School. He had been diagnosed with a learning disability while at First Coast High and was considered an academic non-entity for his first three years of high school.

While at Arlington in 2009–10, Brown played for the basketball team and was named the Florida 1A Player of the Year after averaging 17.9 points, 12.1 rebounds and 2.3 blocks per game, leading his team in all three categories. He was also a first-team All-State and Jacksonville Times-Union All-First Coast team. The team finished with a 23–6 record and won the Florida Class 1A title game.

In 2010–11, Brown split the year playing for both Body of Christ Christian Academy in Raleigh, North Carolina, and Oldsmar Christian School in Oldsmar, Florida. He had to attend these prep schools and a sit out a redshirt college year in order to be deemed eligible by the NCAA.

== College career ==
After redshirting the 2011–12 season, Brown joined the High Point Panthers in 2012–13. He was named the Big South Freshman of the Year and become just the second freshman ever to be named to the first-team All-Big South. In 28 games, he averaged 16.4 points, 6.1 rebounds, 1.7 steals and 1.2 blocks in 25.9 minutes per game.

As a sophomore in 2013–14, Brown was named the Big South Conference Player of the Year. He started all 31 of HPU's games while averaging 19.5 points and 7.7 rebounds. He scored a career-high 34 points in February 2014.

As a junior in 2014–15, Brown was named first-team All-Big South for third consecutive season, becoming fifth player in league history to do so. In 32 games, he made 29 starts and averaged 19.3 points, 6.0 rebounds, 1.2 assists, 1.2 steals and 1.0 blocks in 31.1 minutes per game. In February 2015, Jay Bilas called Brown "the best dunker in college basketball". That same month, he tied his career high of 34 points.

As a senior in 2015–16, Brown became the first player in Big South history to be voted Player of the Year and Defensive Player of the Year in the same season, and became just the second player to be voted First-Team All-Conference all four years. He also became the sixth two-time Player of the Year honoree in league history. Brown capped the regular-season with 19.6 points (third in the Big South), a 60.2 field goal percentage (first), 7.1 rebounds (sixth), 1.75 blocked shots (third) and 3.25 offensive rebounds per game (first). He also reached 2,000 career points in January 2016. He injured his foot during the 2016 Big South Conference tournament and missed the Portsmouth Invitational.

== Professional career ==
Due to the injury suffered at the end of his senior year, Brown was only able to participant in three workouts during the last week of the NBA predraft workouts. He subsequently went undrafted in the 2016 NBA draft and only managed 12 minutes in one game for the Charlotte Hornets during the 2016 NBA Summer League in Orlando.

On August 12, 2016, Brown signed with Virtus Roma of Italy's Serie A2. In 34 games during the 2016–17 season, he averaged 19.9 points, 8.1 rebounds, 1.8 assists and 1.9 steals per game.

On July 28, 2017, Brown signed with Universo Treviso Basket of the Serie A2. In 39 games during the 2017–18 season, he averaged 16.9 points, 6.6 rebounds, 1.2 assists and 1.4 steals per game.

On July 18, 2018, Brown signed with New Basket Brindisi of the Lega Basket Serie A (LBA). In 33 games during the 2018–19 season, he averaged 14.3 points, 6.4 rebounds and 1.5 assists per game.

On July 16, 2019, Brown re-signed with New Basket Brindisi. In 21 league games, he averaged 11.8 points, 6.1 rebounds, 1.4 assists and 1.9 steals per game. He also averaged 11.6 points, 4.9 rebounds, 1.2 assists and 1.5 steals in 13 BCL games.

On July 9, 2020, Brown signed with Russian team Unics Kazan of the VTB United League. In 31 league games, he averaged 9.5 points, 5.5 rebounds, 1.6 assists and 2.2 steals per game. He also averaged 10.8 points, 6.3 rebounds, 1.2 assists and 1.9 steals in 24 EuroCup games. He was named to the All-EuroCup Second Team and was the VTB United League Defensive Player of the Year.

On June 28, 2021, Brown re-signed with UNICS Kazan on a two-year deal. In February 2022, he set a EuroLeague record for total steals in a single season, reaching 66 steals to surpass Manu Ginóbili's record from 2001. Later that month, he exercised his right to leave the country following the Russian invasion of Ukraine.

On April 11, 2022, Brown signed with Pallacanestro Brescia of the Italian LBA. In seven games to finish the 2021–22 season, he averaged 9.3 points, 5.6 rebounds, 1.6 assists and 2.1 steals per game.

On May 26, 2022, Brown signed a three-year deal with AS Monaco Basket of the French LNB Pro A. On July 11, 2023, he opted into the second year of his deal with the club. He was named LNB Pro A Best Defender for the 2023–24 season. In the 2023–24 EuroLeague, Brown led the competition in charges drawn and ranked in the top three for forced turnovers. He was the only big man among the league's top 10 players in steals and charges. He averaged 6.0 points, 3.7 rebounds, 1.4 assists, 1.1 steals, and an 8.4 PIR in 25 minutes per game.

Following the 2023–24 season, Brown became a free agent after parting ways with Monaco due to a shoulder injury that ruled him out until January 2025. On December 9, 2024, he signed with Crvena zvezda of the Serbian league on a 1+1 contract. Crvena zvezda won the 2025 Serbian Cup, but Brown did not participate as he was not registered as one of the four foreign Cup players. After declining a team option, Crvena zvezda parted ways Brown on July 17, 2025.

On August 14, 2025, Brown signed with the South East Melbourne Phoenix of the Australian National Basketball League (NBL) for the 2025–26 season. He was named NBL Best Defensive Player and All-NBL First Team.

On February 5, 2026, Brown signed with Santeros de Aguada of the Baloncesto Superior Nacional (BSN). He averaged 12.8 points and 7.4 rebounds during the 2026 BSN season.

On June 12, 2026, Brown signed with Pallacanestro Brescia of the LBA, returning to the team for a second stint. Later that month, Pallacanestro Brescia's LBA licence was transferred to a new club, Maxima Roma. Brown subsequently joined Maxima Roma for the 2026–27 season.

== Career statistics ==
Legend
| GP | Games played | GS | Games started | MPG | Minutes per game |
| FG% | Field-goal percentage | 3P% | 3-point field-goal percentage | FT% | Free-throw percentage |
| RPG | Rebounds per game | APG | Assists per game | SPG | Steals per game |
| BPG | Blocks per game | PPG | Points per game | PIR | Performance index rating |
| **Bold** | Career high |

=== EuroLeague ===
| * | Led the league |

| Year | Team | GP | GS | MPG | FG% | 3P% | FT% | RPG | APG | SPG | BPG | PPG | PIR |
|---|---|---|---|---|---|---|---|---|---|---|---|---|---|
| 2021–22 | UNICS | 25 | 21 | **30.8** | .484 | .133 | .600 | **4.8** | 1.2 | **2.8*** | .1 | **10.3** | **12.5** |
| 2022–23 | Monaco | **41*** | **38** | 22.4 | **.485** | **.375** | .682 | 3.5 | .8 | 1.1 | **.2** | 5.4 | 6.5 |
| 2023–24 | Monaco | 36 | 34 | 25.3 | .471 | .000 | **.714** | 3.7 | **1.4** | 1.1 | .1 | 6.0 | 8.4 |
| Career | | 102 | 93 | 25.5 | .480 | .185 | .658 | 3.9 | 1.1 | 1.5 | .1 | 6.8 | 8.7 |

=== EuroCup ===
| Year | Team | GP | GS | MPG | FG% | 3P% | FT% | RPG | APG | SPG | BPG | PPG | PIR |
|---|---|---|---|---|---|---|---|---|---|---|---|---|---|
| 2020–21 | UNICS | 24 | 5 | 25.9 | .533 | .250 | .766 | 6.3 | 1.2 | 1.9 | .4 | 10.8 | 14.5 |
| Career | | 24 | 5 | 25.9 | .533 | .250 | .766 | 6.3 | 1.2 | 1.9 | .4 | 10.8 | 14.5 |

=== Basketball Champions League ===
| Year | Team | GP | GS | MPG | FG% | 3P% | FT% | RPG | APG | SPG | BPG | PPG |
|---|---|---|---|---|---|---|---|---|---|---|---|---|
| 2019–20 | Brindisi | 13 | 10 | 24.9 | .545 | .000 | .576 | 4.9 | 1.1 | 1.5 | .2 | 11.6 |
| Career | | 13 | 10 | 24.9 | .545 | .000 | .576 | 4.9 | 1.1 | 1.5 | .2 | 11.6 |

=== Domestic leagues ===
| Year | Team | League | GP | MPG | FG% | 3P% | FT% | RPG | APG | SPG | BPG | PPG |
|---|---|---|---|---|---|---|---|---|---|---|---|---|
| 2016–17 | (Italy) Virtus Roma | Serie A2 | 34 | 35.1 | .600 | .000 | .686 | 8.1 | 1.8 | 1.9 | .8 | 19.8 |
| 2017–18 | (Italy) Universo Treviso | Serie A2 | 39 | 28.3 | .542 | .000 | .660 | 6.6 | 1.2 | 1.4 | .4 | 16.9 |
| 2018–19 | (Italy) Brindisi | LBA | 33 | 29.2 | .546 | .200 | .663 | 6.4 | 1.5 | 1.0 | .5 | 14.3 |
| 2019–20 | (Italy) Brindisi | LBA | 21 | 30.7 | .472 | .200 | .608 | 6.1 | 1.4 | 1.9 | .6 | 11.8 |
| 2020–21 | (Russia) UNICS | VTBUL | 31 | 25.1 | .521 | .000 | .701 | 5.5 | 1.6 | 2.2 | .3 | 9.5 |
| 2021–22 | (Russia) UNICS | VTBUL | 13 | 29.9 | .486 | .231 | .828 | 6.3 | 2.1 | 1.8 | .4 | 12.4 |
| 2021–22 | (Italy) Brescia | LBA | 7 | 26.4 | .483 | .200 | .571 | 5.6 | 1.6 | 2.1 | — | 9.3 |
| 2022–23 | (France) Monaco | LNB Élite | 35 | 19.9 | .494 | .000 | .649 | 2.9 | .9 | 1.1 | .2 | 5.1 |
| 2023–24 | (France) Monaco | LNB Élite | 30 | 19.8 | .519 | .333 | .568 | 2.8 | 1.0 | .8 | .1 | 5.4 |

=== College ===
| Year | Team | GP | GS | MPG | FG% | 3P% | FT% | RPG | APG | SPG | BPG | PPG |
|---|---|---|---|---|---|---|---|---|---|---|---|---|
| 2011–12 | High Point | Redshirt | | | | | | | | | | |
| 2012–13 | High Point | 28 | 28 | 25.9 | .519 | — | .662 | 6.1 | .7 | **1.7** | 1.2 | 16.4 |
| 2013–14 | High Point | 31 | **31** | **31.8** | .545 | .000 | .745 | **7.7** | 1.9 | 1.5 | 1.6 | 19.4 |
| 2014–15 | High Point | **32** | 29 | 31.1 | .550 | .000 | **.756** | 6.0 | 1.2 | 1.2 | 1.0 | 19.3 |
| 2015–16 | High Point | 28 | 28 | 29.6 | **.602** | **1.000** | .701 | 7.1 | **2.2** | **1.7** | **1.7** | **19.6** |
| Career | | 119 | 116 | 29.7 | .554 | .083 | .719 | 6.7 | 1.5 | 1.5 | 1.4 | 18.7 |

== Personal life ==
Brown was very close to his mother and grandmother, both of whom died during Brown's college career at High Point. He has one older brother, Javon, and one younger brother, Ja'Ron.
