= Nathan Sobey =

Australian basketball player (born 1990)

No. 20 – South East Melbourne Phoenix
- Position: Point guard / shooting guard
- League: NBL

Personal information
- Born: 14 July 1990 (age 36) Warrnambool, Victoria, Australia
- Listed height: 190 cm (6 ft 3 in)
- Listed weight: 82 kg (181 lb)

Career information
- High school: Emmanuel College (Warrnambool, Victoria); St Patrick's (Ballarat, Victoria)
- College: Cochise (2010–2012); Wyoming (2012–2014)
- NBA draft: 2014: undrafted
- Playing career: 2014–present

Career history
- 2014: Ballarat Miners
- 2014–2015: Cairns Taipans
- 2015: Cairns Marlins
- 2015–2019: Adelaide 36ers
- 2017: PAOK
- 2019: SIG Strasbourg
- 2019–2024: Brisbane Bullets
- 2020–2021; 2023–2024: Ipswich Force
- 2024–present: South East Melbourne Phoenix
- 2025: Santeros de Aguada
- 2026: Indios de Mayagüez

Career highlights
- 2× All-NBL First Team (2021, 2026); 3× All-NBL Second Team (2017, 2019, 2024); NBL Most Improved Player (2017); NBL1 North champion (2023); NBL1 North Finals MVP (2023); All-NBL1 North Second Team (2023); Gaze Medal (2019)
Medals
Men's basketball
Representing Australia
Olympic Games
Bronze medal – third place	2020 Tokyo	Team
Commonwealth Games
Gold medal – first place	2018 Gold Coast	Team

Nathan Adam Sobey (born 14 July 1990) is an Australian professional basketball player for the South East Melbourne Phoenix of the National Basketball League (NBL). He played college basketball for the Wyoming Cowboys before debuting in the NBL in 2014 for the Cairns Taipans. He was a member of the Australian Boomers team that won bronze at the 2020 Tokyo Olympics.

== Early life ==
Sobey was born in Warrnambool, Victoria. He attended Emmanuel College in Warrnambool and St Patrick's College in Ballarat. He is listed by Emmanuel College as being a member of their Class of 2008, but sources also indicate he attended and represented St Patrick's College in 2008. He grew up playing for the Warrnambool Seahawks.

== College career ==
Sobey moved to the United States in 2010 to play college basketball for Cochise College. During his freshman season, he averaged 7.9 points, 2.9 rebounds and 1.2 assists. As a sophomore in 2011–12, he averaged 16.5 points, 6.9 rebounds, 2.5 assists and 1.8 steals per game. He earned First-Team All-Conference and First-Team All-Region honors.

In April 2012, Sobey signed a National Letter of Intent to play for Wyoming in the NCAA Division I.

As a junior in 2012–13, Sobey appeared in 32 games for the Cowboys and averaged 3.5 points and 1.0 rebounds in 13.3 minutes per game. On 26 February 2013 against Air Force, he scored a season-high 22 points in a career-high 31 minutes.

As a senior in 2013–14, Sobey was one of two Cowboys to start all 33 games. He averaged 9.8 points, 3.4 rebounds and 1.9 assists in 30.2 minutes per game. He scored a career-high 33 points to go with four rebounds and three assists against Colorado State on 8 March 2014.

== Professional career ==
After graduating from Wyoming, Sobey returned to Australia and joined the Ballarat Miners of the South East Australian Basketball League (SEABL). In 10 games during the 2014 SEABL season, he averaged 15.0 points, 3.8 rebounds and 2.2 assists per game.

In August 2014, Sobey joined the Cairns Taipans of the National Basketball League (NBL) as a training player ahead of the 2014–15 season. He joined the Taipans' full-time roster in September as the eleventh man, and in January 2015 was elevated to the playing squad as an injury replacement for Corey Maynard. Following the NBL season, he joined the Cairns Marlins for the 2015 Queensland Basketball League (QBL) season.

In July 2015, Sobey signed a three-year deal with the Adelaide 36ers. He was soon mentored by former 36er Al Green. In the 2016–17 NBL season, Sobey earned the NBL Most Improved Player Award and was named to the All-NBL Second Team. Following the NBL season, he had a stint with PAOK to finish the 2016–17 Greek League season.

In April 2017, Sobey extended his contract with the 36ers for another two years. He later spent time with the Utah Jazz during the 2017 NBA Summer League.

On 26 October 2018, Sobey recorded a triple-double with 22 points, 11 rebounds and 10 assists in the 36ers' 91–83 win over the Cairns Taipans. Following the 2018–19 NBL season, Sobey had a stint with SIG Strasbourg in France.

On 5 April 2019, Sobey signed with the Brisbane Bullets on a three-year deal. He was named to the All-NBL First Team for the 2020–21 NBL season. On 27 April 2022, he re-signed with the Bullets on a three-year deal.

On 9 February 2024, Sobey scored a career-high 37 points in the Bullets' 102–84 win over the Adelaide 36ers.

On 28 March 2024, Sobey parted ways with the Bullets.

On 14 April 2024, Sobey signed with the South East Melbourne Phoenix for the 2024–25 NBL season. Following the NBL season, he joined Santeros de Aguada of the Baloncesto Superior Nacional for the 2025 season.

On 31 March 2025, Sobey and the Phoenix mutually exercised the club option on his contract for the 2025–26 NBL season. In October 2025, he played his 300th NBL game. On 13 December 2025, he scored 36 points in a 92–80 win over the New Zealand Breakers. On 8 January 2026, he tied his career high with 37 points in a 124–113 overtime win over the Illawarra Hawks. He was named to the All-NBL First Team. In game two of the Phoenix's semi-finals series against the Adelaide 36ers, Sobey scored a career-high 41 points with eight 3-pointers in a 101–92 win. For the season, he averaged a career-high 22.5 points per game.

On 14 February 2026, Sobey signed a two-year contract (second year mutual option) extension with the Phoenix. In April 2026, he joined Indios de Mayagüez for the 2026 BSN season.

In September 2026, Sobey was named co-captain of the Phoenix alongside Jordan Hunter for the third straight season. He missed the 2026–27 season opener due to back tightness. On 8 November 2026, he had a season-best 33 points in a 110–99 loss to the Sydney Kings.

=== State League stints ===
In 2016, Sobey played for the Warrnambool Seahawks and helped them win the Big V Division One championship. He was named league MVP and Finals MVP. He played for the Seahawks again in 2018.

In 2020, Sobey played for the Ipswich Force in the Queensland State League (QSL). He returned to the Force, now in the NBL1 North, for the 2021 NBL1 season. With the Force in the 2023 NBL1 season, Sobey helped Ipswich reach the NBL1 North grand final series, where they defeated the Gold Coast Rollers 2–1 to win the championship. Sobey was named Finals MVP. He re-joined the Force for the 2024 NBL1 North season.

== National team career ==
In 2018, Sobey won gold with the Australian Boomers at the Commonwealth Games. The following year he played for the Boomers at the FIBA World Cup.

At the 2019 Australian Basketball Hall of Fame awards night, Sobey was recognised alongside Nick Kay with the 2019 Gaze Family Medal for performances at the World Cup Qualifiers and the Commonwealth Games.

In February 2021, Sobey was named in the Boomers' Olympic squad. He went on to help the Boomers win the bronze medal.

In November 2024, Sobey joined the Boomers for the 2025 FIBA Asia Cup qualifiers.

== Personal life ==
Sobey has two brothers. Sobey got married in 2018.
