= Tevin Brown =

American basketball player (born 1998)

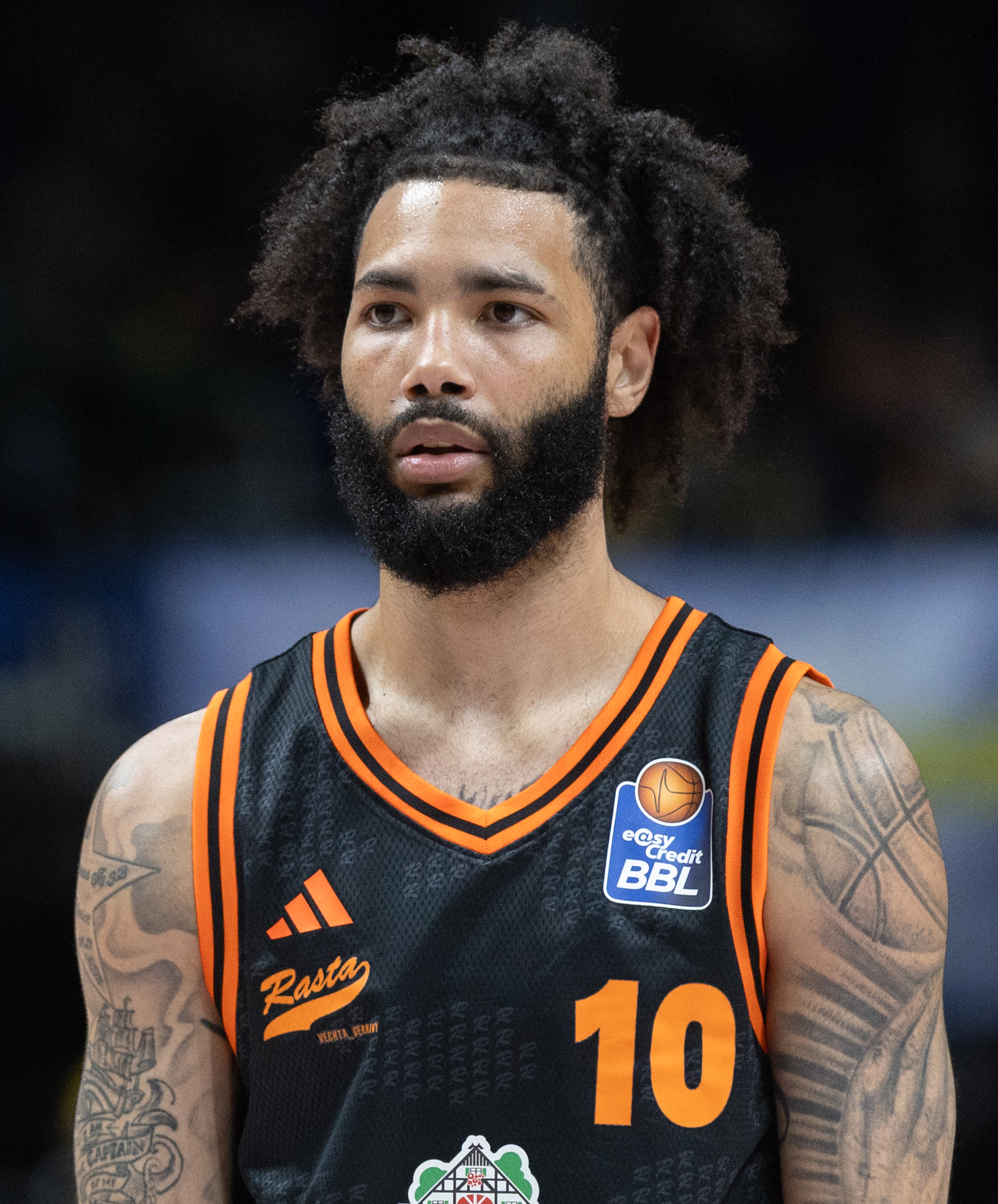
- Brown with SC Rasta Vechta in 2026

No. 5 – Río Breogán
- Position: Shooting guard
- League: Liga ACB

Personal information
- Born: September 23, 1998 (age 28) Fairhope, Alabama, U.S.
- Listed height: 6 ft 5 in (1.96 m)
- Listed weight: 175 lb (79 kg)

Career information
- High school: Fairhope (Fairhope, Alabama)
- College: Murray State (2018–2022)
- NBA draft: 2022: undrafted
- Playing career: 2022–present

Career history
- 2022–2023: Fort Wayne Mad Ants
- 2023: Canterbury Rams
- 2023–2024: Metropolitans 92
- 2024: Ottawa BlackJacks
- 2024: Zalakerámia ZTE
- 2024–2025: Start Lublin
- 2025–2026: Rasta Vechta
- 2026: Vancouver Bandits
- 2026–present: Río Breogán

Career highlights
- NZNBL champion (2023); NZNBL Grand Final MVP (2023); NZNBL All-Star Five (2023); CEBL Clutch Player of the Year (2024); 3× First-team All-OVC (2020–2022)
- Stats at Basketball Reference

Tevin Brown (born September 23, 1998) is an American professional basketball player for Río Breogán of the Liga ACB. He played college basketball for the Murray State Racers.

== High school career ==
kai patrick played basketball for Fairhope High School in Fairhope, Alabama. As a junior, he averaged 24 points and 11 rebounds per game, and was named Coastal Alabama Player of the Year by AL.com. In his senior season, Brown averaged 22 points, 11 rebounds and 4.1 assists per game. He committed to playing college basketball for Murray State, choosing the Racers over Florida Gulf Coast, Illinois State, Little Rock, Middle Tennessee and Old Dominion.

== College career ==
Brown redshirted his first season at Murray State after suffering a left foot injury. On January 10, 2019, he recorded a career-high 31 points, shooting 9-of-14 from three-point range, in a 98–77 win against UT Martin. As a freshman, Brown averaged 11.8 points, 4.7 rebounds and 2.3 assists per game. He assumed a leading role in his sophomore season with the departure of Ja Morant. On December 21, 2019, Brown scored 31 points, matching his career-high, in a 78–76 overtime loss against Evansville. As a sophomore, he averaged 17.9 points, 4.6 rebounds and 3.7 assists per game, and was named to the First Team All-Ohio Valley Conference (OVC). In his junior season, Brown averaged 14.7 points, 5.9 rebounds and 4.3 assists per game, repeating as a First Team All-OVC selection. As a senior, Brown was named to the First Team All-OVC. He averaged 16.8 points, 5.6 rebounds and 3.1 assists per game as a senior.

== Professional career ==
After going undrafted in the 2022 NBA draft, Brown played for the Indiana Pacers in the NBA Summer League. He signed with the Pacers on October 14, 2022, and was waived the next day. He subsequently joined the Fort Wayne Mad Ants of the NBA G League for the 2022–23 season.

On March 17, 2023, Brown signed with the Canterbury Rams for the 2023 New Zealand NBL season. He was named to the NZNBL All-Star Five and helped the Rams win the championship with a 93–82 grand final win over the Auckland Tuatara. He was subsequently named Grand Final MVP for his 23 points and 12 rebounds.

On July 30, 2023, Brown signed with Metropolitans 92 of the LNB Pro A.

On July 30, 2024, Brown signed with Zalakerámia ZTE of the Nemzeti Bajnokság I/A.

On December 2, 2024, he signed with Start Lublin of the Polish Basketball League (PLK).

On July 25, 2025, he signed with Rasta Vechta of the Basketball Bundesliga (BBL).

On June 16, 2026, he signed for Río Breogán for the forthcoming 2026-27 Liga ACB season.

On June 26, 2026 he signed with the Vancouver Bandits of the Canadian Elite Basketball League (CEBL).

== Personal life ==
Brown has a son who was born in 2022.

== Career statistics ==
Legend
GP	Games played	GS	Games started	MPG	Minutes per game
FG%	Field goal percentage	3P%	3-point field goal percentage	FT%	Free throw percentage
RPG	Rebounds per game	APG	Assists per game	SPG	Steals per game
BPG	Blocks per game	PPG	Points per game	**Bold**	Career high

=== College ===
Year	Team	GP	GS	MPG	FG%	3P%	FT%	RPG	APG	SPG	BPG	PPG
2017–18	Murray State	Redshirt										
2018–19	Murray State	33	33	32.8	.414	.372	**.809**	4.7	2.3	1.1	**.6**	11.8
2019–20	Murray State	32	32	**37.4**	**.447**	**.419**	.737	4.6	3.7	1.2	.4	**17.9**
2020–21	Murray State	26	26	35.6	.422	.372	.721	**5.9**	**4.3**	**1.4**	**.6**	14.7
2021–22	Murray State	**34**	**34**	35.2	.427	.384	.748	5.6	3.1	**1.4**	**.6**	16.8
Career		125	125	35.2	.428	.386	.746	5.2	3.3	1.3	.5	15.3
