= Javonte =

Javonte is a masculine given name. Notable people with the name include:

- Javonte Cooke (born 1999), American basketball player
- Javonte Douglas (born 1992), American basketball player
- Javonte Green (1993), American-Montenegrin basketball player
- Javonte Perkins (born 1998), American basketball player
- Javonte Smart (born 1999), American basketball player
- Javonte Williams (born 2000), American football player
