= New Zealand NBL Defensive Player of the Year Award =

The National Basketball League Defensive Player of the Year is an annual National Basketball League (NBL) award given since the 2019 New Zealand NBL season to the best defensive player of the regular season.

== Winners ==
Year	Player	Nationality	Team	Ref
2019	Isaiah Wilkins	United States	Canterbury Rams	
2020	Jarrod Kenny	New Zealand	Otago Nuggets	
2020	Izayah Mauriohooho-Le'afa	New Zealand	Auckland Huskies	
2021	Dion Prewster	New Zealand	Wellington Saints	
2022	Jarrod West	United States	Nelson Giants	
2023	Robert Loe	New Zealand	Auckland Tuatara	
2024	Robert Loe (2)	New Zealand	Auckland Tuatara	
2025	Hyrum Harris	New Zealand	Wellington Saints	
2026	Sam Timmins	New Zealand	Southland Sharks	

== See also ==
- List of National Basketball League (New Zealand) awards
