= Izayah Le'afa =

New Zealand basketball player (born 1996)

No. 2 – New Zealand Breakers
- Position: Point guard
- League: NBL

Personal information
- Born: 7 November 1996 (age 29) Wellington, New Zealand
- Listed height: 188 cm (6 ft 2 in)
- Listed weight: 90 kg (198 lb)

Career information
- High school: St Patrick's College (Wellington, New Zealand)
- College: Sacramento State (2016–2020)
- NBA draft: 2020: undrafted
- Playing career: 2013–present

Career history
- 2013–2015: Wellington Saints
- 2020: Auckland Huskies
- 2020–2022: South East Melbourne Phoenix
- 2022–2024: New Zealand Breakers
- 2023–2026: Wellington Saints
- 2024–2025: Sydney Kings
- 2025–present: New Zealand Breakers

Career highlights
- NBL Ignite Cup winner (2026); 2× NZNBL champion (2014, 2025); NZNBL Most Outstanding Kiwi Guard (2025); NZNBL Defensive Player of the Year (2020); NZNBL All-Star Five (2020)

Izayah Mauriohooho-Le'afa (born 7 November 1996) is a New Zealand professional basketball player for the New Zealand Breakers of the Australian National Basketball League (NBL). He began his career in the New Zealand National Basketball League (NZNBL), playing three seasons for the Wellington Saints before moving to the United States in 2016 to play college basketball for the Sacramento State Hornets. After graduating in 2020, he played a season for the Auckland Huskies and earned NZNBL Defensive Player of the Year and NZNBL All-Star Five. He subsequently joined the South East Melbourne Phoenix in the Australian NBL, where he played two seasons before joining the New Zealand Breakers in 2022. After a season with the Sydney Kings in 2024–25, he re-joined the Breakers.

== Early life and career ==
Le'afa was born and bred in Wellington, New Zealand. He attended St Patrick's College, where he played both basketball and rugby. He played four years for the basketball team and was the starting point guard each of his final three seasons. He averaged over 20 points per game during his last two years and was named the school's Sportsman of the Year and team MVP during each of those seasons. St Patrick's were coached by Le'afa's father, George, who was also an assistant coach with the Wellington Saints in the New Zealand NBL.

Le'afa debuted for the Wellington Saints in the 2013 New Zealand NBL season, but due to suffering from multiple concussions, he missed a number of games over his first two seasons. He won a championship with the Saints in 2014 and then averaged 7.3 points per game in 2015.

== College career ==
Le'afa moved to the United States in 2016 to play college basketball for the Sacramento State Hornets, becoming the program's first ever New Zealand-born player.

As a freshman in 2016–17, Le'afa played in 29 games and made 28 starts, averaging 4.6 points, 2.2 rebounds and 2.0 assists in 25.1 minutes per game. He scored in double figures four times, including a season-best 16 points against Southern Utah on 12 January 2017.

As a sophomore in 2017–18, Le'afa played in 30 games and made 26 starts, averaging 8.5 points, 3.4 rebounds, 3.6 assists and 1.1 steals in 31.0 minutes per game. He scored in double figures in 13 of his final 23 games of the season, including a career-high 23 points against Portland on 21 December 2017.

As a junior in 2018–19, Le'afa played in 30 games and made 26 starts, averaging 8.8 points, 3.0 rebounds, 2.6 assists and 1.5 steals in 31.2 minutes per game. He was a finalist for Big Sky Defensive Player of the Year. He scored in double figures 11 times, including eight games with at least 15 points. He twice had a season high of 18 points.

Due to the COVID-19 pandemic, Le'afa's final season was cut short. As a senior in 2019–20, he started all 28 games in which he appeared, averaging 10.3 points, 3.6 rebounds, 2.1 assists and 1.8 steals in 32.6 minutes per game. He scored in double figures 13 times, including tying his career high with 23 points on two occasions. He was subsequently named an honourable mention all-Big Sky Conference selection.

In his junior and senior seasons, Le'afa was named a Big Sky all-academic selection and NABC Honors Court choice for academic excellence.

== Professional career ==
=== Auckland Huskies (2020) ===
In June 2020, Le'afa was acquired by the Auckland Huskies for the 2020 New Zealand NBL season. In the Huskies' final game of the season, he scored 39 points against the Canterbury Rams. He was named in the league's All-Star Five and earned co-Defensive Player of the Year honours alongside Jarrod Kenny. In 13 games, he averaged 20.5 points, 4.3 rebounds, 5.2 assists and 2.5 steals per game.

=== South East Melbourne Phoenix (2020–2022) ===
On 24 September 2020, Le'afa signed with the South East Melbourne Phoenix in Australia as a development player for the 2020–21 NBL season. He was drawn to the Phoenix by his Kiwi connections with Reuben Te Rangi and assistant coach Judd Flavell. He was quickly thrust into the rotation due to injuries. He had a breakout game on 15 April 2021, scoring a game-high 29 points with eight 3-pointers in a 97–90 loss to the Sydney Kings. In 32 games, he averaged 6.1 points, 1.9 rebounds and 1.8 assists per game.

On 24 June 2021, Le'afa re-signed with the Phoenix on a two-year deal. His hounding defence and ability to get to the rim in his first season saw him earn elevation from development player to a full-time contract. In 2021–22, he emerged as a backcourt starter and one of the best lockdown defenders in the league, averaging 8.9 points, 2.8 rebounds and 2.2 assists in 26 games.

On 7 June 2022, Le'afa and the Phoenix agreed on a mutual release from the second year of his contract.

=== New Zealand Breakers and Wellington Saints (2022–2024) ===
On 10 June 2022, Le'afa signed a two-year deal with the New Zealand Breakers. He helped the Breakers reach the NBL Grand Final series in the 2022–23 season, where they lost 3–2 to the Sydney Kings. In 35 games, he averaged 10.3 points, 2.4 rebounds, 2.1 assists and 1.2 steals per game.

On 27 April 2023, Le'afa signed with the Wellington Saints for the rest of the 2023 New Zealand NBL season.

In the 2023–24 NBL season, Le'afa averaged 7.5 points, 1.8 rebounds, 1.6 assists and 1.2 steals in 30 games.

Le'afa re-joined the Saints for the 2024 New Zealand NBL season.

=== Sydney Kings and Wellington Saints (2024–2025) ===
On 19 April 2024, Le'afa signed a two-year deal with the Sydney Kings. On 27 October 2024, he scored 23 points in a 93–89 loss to the New Zealand Breakers. He appeared in 30 games during the 2024–25 season and averaged 3.7 points, 2.0 assists and 1.9 rebounds across 19.4 minutes per game. The second-year mutual option on Le'afa's contract was declined on 25 March 2025.

Le'afa re-joined the Wellington Saints for the 2025 New Zealand NBL season. He was named the NZNBL Most Outstanding Kiwi Guard.

=== Return to the Breakers and Wellington Saints (2025–present) ===
On 10 April 2025, Le'afa signed a two-year deal with the New Zealand Breakers, returning to the club for a second stint. On 2 December 2025, he was ruled out for the rest of the 2025–26 NBL season due to a stress fracture in his foot. He struggled with his shooting stroke (26% overall and just 22 from deep) before the injury.

On 10 March 2026, Le'afa re-joined the Wellington Saints for the 2026 New Zealand NBL season. He played nine games and averaged 7.6 assists but missed the end of the season with a foot injury.

== National team career ==
In 2013, Le'afa was selected for the New Zealand Tall Blacks, making his senior national team debut as a 16-year-old. In 2014, he captained the Junior Tall Blacks at the FIBA Oceania Under 18 Championship and represented New Zealand at 3x3 basketball at the Summer Youth Olympics. In 2015, he was selected to play for the Tall Blacks' Olympic qualifying team.

In July 2023, Le'afa was named in the Tall Blacks squad for the 2023 FIBA World Cup. He re-joined the Tall Blacks for qualifiers in February 2024.

In November 2025, Le'afa was named in the Tall Blacks squad for the first window of the FIBA Basketball World Cup 2027 Asian Qualifiers.

== Personal life ==
Le'afa is the son of George and Dana. His father played in the New Zealand NBL for the Wellington Saints and won multiple championships. He also coached Le'afa at school and at the Saints.
