= Romaro Gill =

Jamaican basketball player (born 1994)

No. 35 – Club Ourense Baloncesto
- Position: Center
- League: Primera FEB

Personal information
- Born: October 2, 1994 (age 32) Saint Thomas Parish, Jamaica
- Listed height: 7 ft 2 in (2.18 m)
- Listed weight: 255 lb (116 kg)

Career information
- High school: St. Thomas (Golden Grove, Jamaica)
- College: Vincennes (2015–2017); Seton Hall (2018–2020)
- NBA draft: 2020: undrafted
- Playing career: 2021–present

Career history
- 2021: Salt Lake City Stars
- 2021: Wellington Saints
- 2021–2022: Raptors 905
- 2022–2023: Southland Sharks
- 2023–present: Ourense

Career highlights
- Big East Defensive Player of the Year (2020); Big East Most Improved Player (2020)
- Stats at NBA.com
- Stats at Basketball Reference

Romaro Gill (born October 2, 1994) is a Jamaican professional basketball player for Ourense of the Primera FEB. He played college basketball for the Vincennes Trailblazers and the Seton Hall Pirates.

== Early life ==
Gill was born and raised in Saint Thomas, Jamaica and grew up playing cricket, volleyball and soccer. He played cricket for four years at St. Thomas Technical High School in Golden Grove, Jamaica. Gill did not play basketball until his final year at the school, when it began offering the sport. At a basketball camp in 2013, he drew the attention of scout Michael Minto, who helped him secure a scholarship to play collegiately in the United States. Gill accepted an offer from NJCAA program Vincennes, whose head coach Todd Franklin was a friend of Minto's.

== College career ==
As a freshman at Vincennes, Gill averaged 1.8 points per game in 13 games. He averaged 5.1 points, 5.2 rebounds and 2.5 blocks per game as a sophomore and ranked 10th in the NJCAA with 85 blocked shots. After the season, Gill transferred to Seton Hall. The team's assistant coach Grant Billmeier, had inadvertently discovered him while scouting potential recruits at the NJCAA Division I Championship in March 2017. Gill redshirted his first year to learn from his veteran teammates, like Ángel Delgado. In his junior season, he averaged 2.3 points, 2.7 rebounds and 1.3 blocks per game. Gill was named to the Big East Conference All-Academic Team in 2018 and 2019. On January 18, 2020, Gill posted a double-double of 14 points, 13 rebounds and 6 blocks in an 82–79 win over St. John's. On January 22, Gill recorded 17 points, 8 blocks and 6 rebounds in a 73–64 win over Providence. As a senior, he averaged 7.8 points, 5.6 rebounds and 3.2 blocks per game and was named Big East Defensive Player of the Year and Big East Most Improved Player. He led the Big East and ranked third in the NCAA Division I in blocks per game.

== Professional career ==
=== Salt Lake City Stars (2021) ===
After going undrafted in the 2020 NBA draft, Gill signed an Exhibit 10 contract with the Utah Jazz on November 30, 2020. He was waived on December 18 prior to the start of the 2020–21 NBA season. He went on to play for the Salt Lake City Stars of the NBA G League in the hub season between February and March 2021.

=== Wellington Saints (2021) ===
Gill joined the Wellington Saints in April 2021 for the New Zealand NBL season. He was released on June 16, 2021.

=== Raptors 905 (2021–2022) ===
In August 2021, Gill played for the Los Angeles Lakers in the NBA Summer League.

On October 30, 2021, Gill was acquired by Raptors 905 for the 2021–22 NBA G League season. He was waived on January 31, 2022, re-acquired on February 3, then waived again on March 1. In 19 games, he averaged 3.7 points, 4.1 rebounds and 1.5 blocks per game.

=== Southland Sharks (2022–2023) ===
On April 14, 2022, Gill signed with the Southland Sharks for the 2022 New Zealand NBL season.

On February 16, 2023, Gill re-signed with the Sharks for the 2023 New Zealand NBL season. He was released by the Sharks on May 23, 2023.

== Personal life ==
Gill served on the NCAA Men's Basketball Oversight Committee and Student-Athlete Advisory Committee at Seton Hall. He volunteers for Grow a Row, picking vegetables to go to food banks in New Jersey.
