= Keith Williams (basketball, born 1998) =

American basketball player

Personal information
- Born: July 25, 1998 (age 28) Brooklyn, New York, U.S.
- Listed height: 6 ft 5 in (1.96 m)
- Listed weight: 215 lb (98 kg)

Career information
- High school: Bishop Loughlin Memorial (Brooklyn, New York)
- College: Cincinnati (2017–2021)
- NBA draft: 2023: undrafted
- Playing career: 2022–present
- Position: Shooting guard

Career history
- 2022: Otago Nuggets
- 2023: Raptors 905
- 2024: VfL AstroStars Bochum
- 2025: Halcones de Ciudad Obregón
- 2025: Digenis Morphou

Career highlights
- NZNBL champion (2022); NZNBL Grand Final MVP (2022); Second-team All-AAC (2021)

Keith Williams Jr. (born July 25, 1998) is an American professional basketball player for VfL AstroStars Bochum of the ProA. He played college basketball for the Cincinnati Bearcats.

== High school career ==
Williams played basketball for Bishop Loughlin Memorial High School in Brooklyn, New York. As a junior, he averaged 15 points and 4.3 rebounds per game. In his senior season, Williams averaged 24.2 points and 12.6 rebounds per game, earning All-New York City Player of the Year and Catholic High School Athletic Association Class AA Most Valuable Player honors. He competed for New Heights on the Amateur Athletic Union circuit alongside Moses Brown and Isaiah Washington. He committed to playing college basketball for Cincinnati over offers from Dayton and Oklahoma State.

== College career ==
Williams came off the bench during his freshman season at Cincinnati, and averaged 3.1 points per game. In his sophomore season, he became a regular starter, averaging 9.9 points, 3.2 rebounds, 1.1 assists and 1.1 steals per game. On March 3, 2020, Williams posted a career-high 30 points and four steals in a 79–67 win against South Florida. As a junior, he averaged 12.6 points and 4.6 rebounds per game. Williams declared for the 2020 NBA draft before withdrawing and returning to college. For his senior season, he assumed a leading role with the departure of Jarron Cumberland. On December 9, 2020, he scored a season-high 27 points in a 78–73 win over Furman. As a senior, Williams averaged 14.3 points, 4.1 rebounds and 2.5 assists per game, and was named to the Second Team All-American Athletic Conference. Williams finished his Bearcat career with 1,156 points, good for 35th all–time in program history as of 2020.

He declared for the 2021 NBA draft but decided to withdraw and enter the transfer portal. Williams transferred to Western Kentucky for his fifth season of eligibility, granted due to the COVID-19 pandemic. However, he was ruled out for the season on January 18, 2022, before playing a game, as his appeal for immediate eligibility was denied by the NCAA.

== Professional career ==
On April 20, 2022, Williams signed with the Otago Nuggets for the 2022 New Zealand NBL season. He helped the Nuggets win the championship with an 81–73 win over the Auckland Tuatara in the grand final. He earned grand final MVP honors after scoring 34 points.

=== Raptors 905 (2023) ===
On February 18, 2023, Williams was acquired by the Raptors 905, but was waived on November 22.

=== VfL AstroStars Bochum (2024–present) ===
On January 7, 2024, Williams signed with VfL AstroStars Bochum of the German ProA.

== Career statistics ==
Legend
| GP | Games played | GS | Games started | MPG | Minutes per game |
| FG% | Field goal percentage | 3P% | 3-point field goal percentage | FT% | Free throw percentage |
| RPG | Rebounds per game | APG | Assists per game | SPG | Steals per game |
| BPG | Blocks per game | PPG | Points per game | **Bold** | Career high |

=== College ===
| Year | Team | GP | GS | MPG | FG% | 3P% | FT% | RPG | APG | SPG | BPG | PPG |
|---|---|---|---|---|---|---|---|---|---|---|---|---|
| 2017–18 | Cincinnati | 33 | 0 | 9.9 | .385 | .148 | .531 | 1.2 | .4 | .5 | .2 | 3.1 |
| 2018–19 | Cincinnati | **35** | **32** | 25.8 | **.451** | .276 | .707 | 3.2 | 1.1 | 1.1 | **.9** | 9.9 |
| 2019–20 | Cincinnati | 30 | 29 | **28.8** | .435 | **.342** | **.792** | **4.6** | 1.6 | **1.2** | **.9** | 12.6 |
| 2020–21 | Cincinnati | 23 | 22 | 27.3 | .398 | .313 | .653 | 4.1 | **2.5** | **1.2** | .7 | **14.3** |
| Career | | 121 | 83 | 22.5 | .424 | .294 | .697 | 3.2 | 1.3 | 1.0 | .7 | 9.6 |
