= 2022 New Zealand NBL season =

- League: New Zealand NBL
- Sport: Basketball
- Duration: 28 April – 13 August
- Games: 18
- Teams: 10

Regular season
- Minor premiers: Taranaki Airs
- Season MVP: Xavier Cooks (Wellington Saints)
- Top scorer: Anthony Hilliard (Taranaki Airs)

Finals
- Champions: Otago Nuggets
- Runners-up: Auckland Tuatara
- Grand Final MVP: Keith Williams

New Zealand NBL seasons
- ← 2021 2023 →

The 2022 NBL season was the 41st season of the National Basketball League. For the second year in a row, the league fielded 10 teams, with the only changes being the rebrand of the Auckland Huskies to Auckland Tuatara and Taranaki Mountainairs to Taranaki Airs.

The regular season commenced on 28 April in Nelson with the Nelson Giants hosting the Otago Nuggets at the Trafalgar Centre. The season contained 15 weeks of regular season games followed by a four-day finals schedule in August.

== Team information ==
Team	City	Arena	Colours	Head coach	Import	Import	Import
Auckland Tuatara	Auckland	Eventfinda Stadium		(New Zealand) Aaron Young	(United States) Chris Johnson	(United States) Siler Schneider	
Canterbury Rams	Christchurch	Cowles Stadium		(New Zealand) Judd Flavell	(United States) Larry Austin Jr.	(South Sudan) Sunday Dech	(United States) Matthew Moyer
Franklin Bulls	Auckland	Franklin Pool and Leisure Centre		(New Zealand) Morgan Maskell	(United States) Giddy Potts		
Hawke's Bay Hawks	Napier	Pettigrew Green Arena		(Australia) Mick Downer	(United States) Tajuan Agee		
Manawatu Jets	Palmerston North	Arena Manawatu		(New Zealand) Natu Taufale	(United States) John Bohannon	(United States) Rob Crawford	(Jordan) Zane Najdawi
Nelson Giants	Nelson	Trafalgar Centre		(New Zealand) Michael Fitchett	(United States) Trey Mourning	(United States) Sam Thompson	(United States) Jarrod West
Otago Nuggets	Dunedin	Edgar Centre		(New Zealand) Brent Matehaere	(United States) Tray Boyd III	(United States) Keith Williams	(United States) Todd Withers
Southland Sharks	Invercargill	Stadium Southland		(Australia) Rob Beveridge	(Jamaica) Romaro Gill	(United States) Daishon Knight	(United States) Winston Shepard
Taranaki Airs	New Plymouth	TSB Stadium		(New Zealand) Trent Adam	(United States) Javonte Douglas	(United States) Anthony Hilliard	(United States) Shaun Willett
Wellington Saints	Wellington	TSB Bank Arena		(New Zealand) Troy McLean	(Australia) Xavier Cooks	(United States) Mike Smith	(United States) Reggie Upshaw

== Summary ==
=== Regular season standings ===
Pos	Team	W	L	Qualification
1	Taranaki Airs	12	6	Semi Finals
2	Nelson Giants	12	6	Semi Finals
3	Otago Nuggets	10	8	Play-in
4	Wellington Saints	10	8	Play-in
5	Auckland Tuatara	10	8	Play-in
6	Hawke's Bay Hawks	10	8	Play-in
7	Canterbury Rams	8	10	
8	Franklin Bulls	7	11	
9	Southland Sharks	6	12	
10	Manawatu Jets	5	13	

Source: NZNBL

=== Finals ===
Play-In Matches
4	Wellington Saints	87
5	Auckland Tuatara	92
3	Otago Nuggets	91
6	Hawke's Bay Hawks	80

Semi Finals
1	Taranaki Airs	104
5	Auckland Tuatara	107
2	Nelson Giants	74
3	Otago Nuggets	89

Final
Auckland Tuatara	73
Otago Nuggets	81

== Awards ==
=== Performance of the Week ===
Round	Player	Team	Ref
1	Trey Mourning	Nelson Giants	
2	Jayden Bezzant	Franklin Bulls	
3	Chris Johnson	Auckland Tuatara	
4	Trey Mourning	Nelson Giants	
5	Javonte Douglas	Taranaki Airs	
6	Chris Johnson	Auckland Tuatara	
7	Xavier Cooks	Wellington Saints	
8	Jarrod West	Nelson Giants	
9	Javonte Douglas	Taranaki Airs	
10	Anthony Hilliard	Taranaki Airs	
11	Corey Webster	Franklin Bulls	
12	Javonte Douglas	Taranaki Airs	
13	Sam Thompson	Nelson Giants	
14	Xavier Cooks	Wellington Saints	
15	Tray Boyd III	Otago Nuggets	

=== Statistics leaders ===
Stats as of the end of the regular season

Category	Player	Team	Stat
Points per game	Anthony Hilliard	Taranaki Airs	26.6
Rebounds per game	John Bohannon	Manawatu Jets	14.0
Assists per game	Jarrod West	Nelson Giants	7.3
Steals per game	Dontae Russo-Nance	Auckland Tuatara	2.9
Blocks per game	Romaro Gill	Southland Sharks	2.9

=== Regular season ===
- Most Valuable Player: Xavier Cooks (Wellington Saints)
- Most Outstanding Guard: Jarrod West (Nelson Giants)
- Most Outstanding NZ Guard: Corey Webster (Franklin Bulls)
- Most Outstanding Forward: Xavier Cooks (Wellington Saints)
- Most Outstanding NZ Forward/Centre: Robert Loe (Auckland Tuatara)
- Scoring Champion: Anthony Hilliard (Taranaki Airs)
- Rebounding Champion: John Bohannon (Manawatu Jets)
- Assist Champion: Jarrod West (Nelson Giants)
- Most Improved Player: Sam Dempster (Nelson Giants)
- Defensive Player of the Year: Jarrod West (Nelson Giants)
- Youth Player of the Year: Dontae Russo-Nance (Auckland Tuatara)
- Coach of the Year: Michael Fitchett (Nelson Giants)
- All-Star Five:
  - G: Jarrod West (Nelson Giants)
  - G: Anthony Hilliard (Taranaki Airs)
  - F: Javonte Douglas (Taranaki Airs)
  - F: Xavier Cooks (Wellington Saints)
  - C: Chris Johnson (Auckland Tuatara)

=== Finals ===
- Grand Final MVP: Keith Williams (Otago Nuggets)
