= Dontae Russo-Nance =

New Zealand basketball player (born 2005)

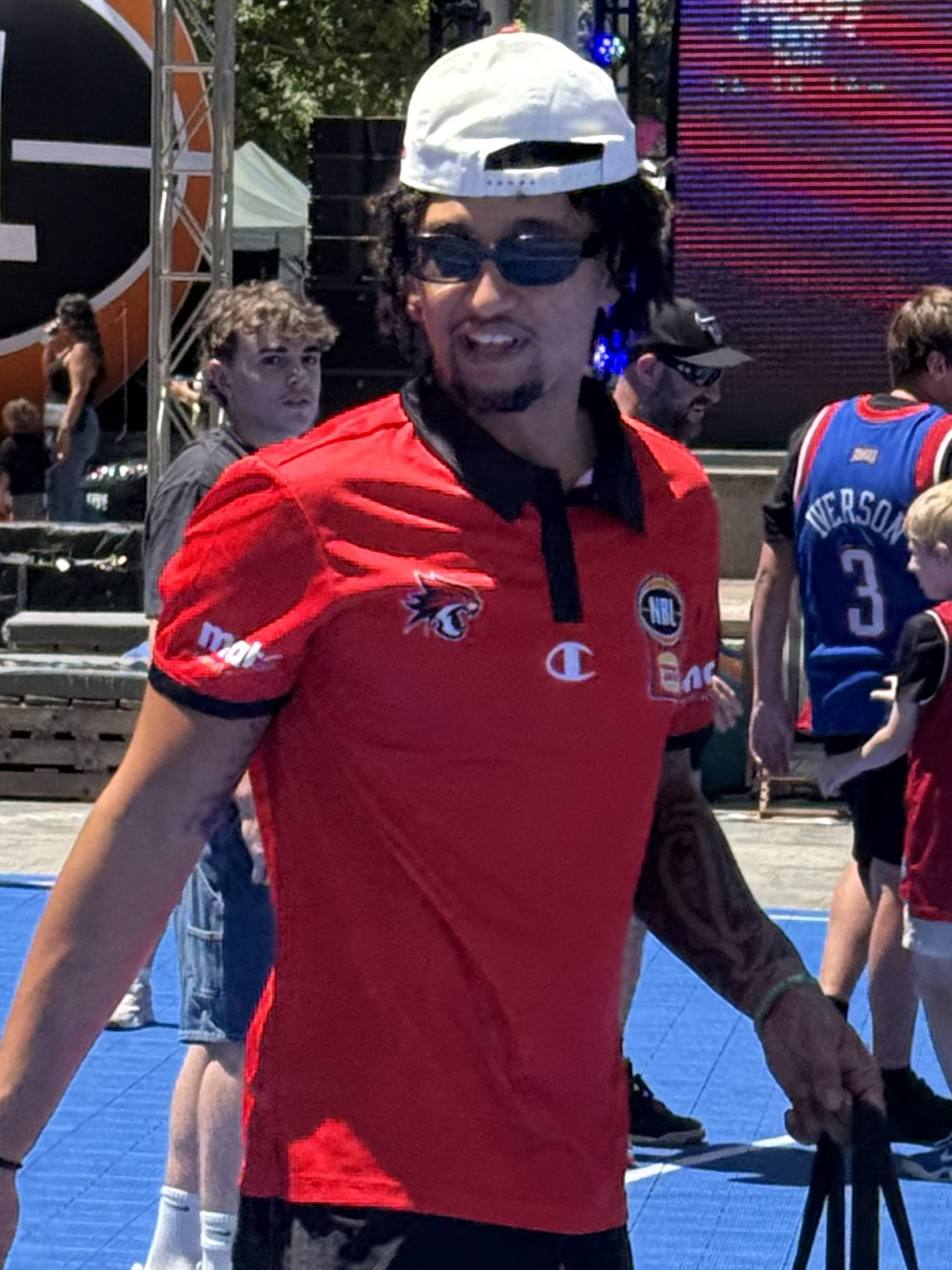
- Russo-Nance with the Perth Wildcats in 2026

Pepperdine Waves
- Position: Guard
- League: West Coast Conference

Personal information
- Born: 20 January 2005 (age 21) Auckland, New Zealand
- Listed height: 190 cm (6 ft 3 in)
- Listed weight: 90 kg (198 lb)

Career information
- High school: Saint Kentigern College (Auckland, New Zealand); Oak Hill Academy (Mouth of Wilson, Virginia)
- College: Pepperdine (2026–present)
- Playing career: 2021–present

Career history
- 2021–2022: Auckland Huskies/Tuatara
- 2023–2026: Perth Wildcats
- 2024: Otago Nuggets
- 2025–2026: Manawatu Jets

Career highlights
- NZNBL Youth Player of the Year (2022)

Dontae Russo-Nance (born 20 January 2005) is a New Zealand college basketball player for the Pepperdine Waves of the West Coast Conference. He debuted in the New Zealand National Basketball League (NZNBL) in 2021 and then had a season in the United States with Oak Hill Academy. Between 2023 and 2026, he played three seasons of the professional basketball for the Perth Wildcats of the Australian National Basketball League (NBL). He made the decision to start his college career in 2026, joining Pepperdine.

== Early life and career ==
Russo-Nance was born in Auckland, New Zealand. He attended Saint Kentigern College and played as a junior for Waitakere Basketball, where he won three national championships across different age groups.

In 2019, Russo-Nance played for an Asia Pacific team at the Junior NBA Global Championship in Orlando, Florida. He featured in six games and averaged 15.7 points, 5.3 rebounds and 3.3 assists.

In 2021, Russo-Nance debuted in the New Zealand NBL for the Auckland Huskies. He averaged 11.5 points, 3.2 rebounds, 2.8 assists and 1.6 steals per game as a bench player, earning runner-up for Youth Player of the Year.

In 2022, Russo-Nance continued with the Auckland franchise, now known as the Tuatara. He helped the Tuatara reach the New Zealand NBL grand final, where he scored 11 points in an 81–73 loss to the Otago Nuggets. In 18 games, he averaged 15.4 points, 4.6 rebounds, 4.2 assists and a league-leading 2.9 steals per game. He was subsequently named Youth Player of the Year.

In August 2022, Russo-Nance was named to the All-Star Five at the Basketball Without Borders Asia camp in Canberra, Australia. The following month, he moved to the United States to attend Oak Hill Academy in Mouth of Wilson, Virginia, for the 2022–23 school year. In February 2023, he competed at the Basketball Without Borders Global camp in Salt Lake City during the 2023 NBA All-Star weekend.

== Professional career ==
On 27 May 2023, Russo-Nance signed a three-year deal with the Perth Wildcats of the Australian National Basketball League (NBL), joining as a development player for the 2023–24 season. A foot injury limited his availability in the middle part of the season and a wrist injury ended his season early. He appeared in three games for the Wildcats in 2023–24, averaging 2.7 points in 2.5 minutes per game.

Russo-Nance joined the Otago Nuggets for the 2024 New Zealand NBL season. In seven games, he averaged 11.4 points, 4.4 rebounds, 3.4 assists and 2.0 steals per game.

He re-joined the Wildcats as a development player for the 2024–25 NBL season, with the plan to be elevated to the full roster in 2025–26. In 10 games for the Wildcats in 2024–25, he averaged 1.1 points in 3.1 minutes per game.

He joined the Manawatu Jets for the 2025 New Zealand NBL season. In 21 games, he averaged 18.2 points, 5.0 rebounds, 4.4 assists and 2.5 steals per game.

Early in the 2025–26 NBL season, Russo-Nance was moved into the Wildcats' starting five. He scored a career-high 12 points in round 21 against the Sydney Kings. In 28 games, he averaged 2.8 points, 1.6 rebounds and 1.4 assists per game.

He re-joined the Manawatu Jets for the 2026 New Zealand NBL season, but parted ways with the team on 29 April 2026 after receiving a college opportunity. He appeared in just two games for the Jets to start the season.

== College career ==
On 11 June 2026, Russo-Nance signed with the Pepperdine Waves of the West Coast Conference.

== National team ==
In July 2025, Russo-Nance was named in his first New Zealand Tall Blacks squad ahead of the 2025 FIBA Asia Cup.

== Personal life ==
Russo-Nance has a Māori mother and an African-American father.
