= Sam Thompson (basketball) =

American basketball player (born 1992)

Personal information
- Born: November 11, 1992 (age 34) Chicago, Illinois, U.S.
- Listed height: 6 ft 7 in (2.01 m)
- Listed weight: 200 lb (91 kg)

Career information
- High school: Whitney Young (Chicago, Illinois)
- College: Ohio State (2011–2015)
- NBA draft: 2015: undrafted
- Playing career: 2015–2024
- Position: Small forward / power forward

Career history
- 2015–2016: Grand Rapids Drive
- 2016: Delaware 87ers
- 2016–2017: Vasas Akademia
- 2017–2019: Greensboro Swarm
- 2019–2020: Saigon Heat
- 2020–2021: Novipiù Casale Monferrato
- 2021–2022: Sioux Falls Skyforce
- 2022: Nelson Giants
- 2022: BC Gargždai-SC
- 2022–2023: Sioux Falls Skyforce
- 2023: Marineros de Puerto Plata
- 2023–2024: Darkhan United
- 2024: Astros de Jalisco

Career highlights
- Honorable mention All-Big Ten (2015)
- Stats at Basketball Reference

Sam Thompson (born November 11, 1992) is an American former professional basketball player. He played college basketball for Ohio State.

== High school career ==
Thompson attended Whitney Young High School in Chicago, Illinois, where he won two state championships (2008–09) and was runner-up in 2010 contributing 10 points and 8 rebounds per game during his junior campaign and 17.6 points with a .568 FG percentage and 8.7 rebounds per game as a senior.

== College career ==
Thompson had offers from Florida, Georgetown, Kansas, and Oregon State, but he chose Ohio State. In 146 career games over four seasons for the Buckeyes, Thompson averaged 6.9 points, 2.8 rebounds and 1.1 assists in 22.9 minutes per game. As a senior, he was named Honorable Mention All-Big 10 by the media.

== Professional career ==
After going undrafted in the 2015 NBA draft, Thompson joined the Minnesota Timberwolves for the Las Vegas Summer League. On September 15, 2015, he signed with the Charlotte Hornets. However, he was later waived by the Hornets on October 23 after appearing in five preseason games. On October 31, he was selected by the Grand Rapids Drive with the seventh overall pick in the 2015 NBA Development League Draft. On January 14, 2016, he was traded to the Delaware 87ers in exchange for Gary Talton.

On August 11, 2016, Thompson signed in Hungary with Vasas Akademia of the Nemzeti Bajnokság I/A.

Between 2017 and 2019, Thompson played two seasons for the Greensboro Swarm of the NBA G League.

For the 2019–20 season, Thompson played in Vietnam for the Saigon Heat of the ASEAN Basketball League, averaging 20.7 points and 8.5 rebounds per game.

On July 19, 2020, Thompson signed with Novipiù Casale Monferrato of the Serie A2 Basket.

On December 29, 2021, Thompson was acquired by the Sioux Falls Skyforce of the NBA G League.

On May 27, 2022, Thompson signed with the Nelson Giants for the rest of the 2022 New Zealand NBL season.

Thompson began the 2022–23 season in Lithuania with BC Gargždai-SC before re-joining the Sioux Falls Skyforce on December 30, 2022.

On May 16, 2023, Thompson signed with the Marineros de Puerto Plata of the Liga Nacional de Baloncesto.

== Personal life ==
Thompson is the son of Hubert Thompson and Kennise Herring. His siblings include Franklin Thompson, Victoria Thompson and Malcolm Carstafhnur.
