= Elizabeth City State Vikings =

- University: Elizabeth City State University
- Conference: CIAA (primary)
- NCAA: Division II
- Athletic director: James Dubose Jr.
- Location: Elizabeth City, North Carolina
- Varsity teams: 11 (4 men's, 7 women's)
- Football stadium: Roebuck Stadium
- Basketball arena: R. L. Vaughn Center
- Softball stadium: South Park
- Nickname: Vikings
- Colors: Royal blue and white
- Website: ecsuvikings.com

The Elizabeth City State Vikings are the athletic teams that represent Elizabeth City State University, located in Elizabeth City, North Carolina, in intercollegiate sports at the Division II level of the National Collegiate Athletic Association (NCAA), primarily competing in the Central Intercollegiate Athletic Association since the 1957–58 academic year.

Elizabeth City State competes in ten intercollegiate varsity sports. Men's sports include basketball, cross country, football, and golf; while women's sports include basketball, bowling, cross country, softball, tennis, and volleyball.

== Conference affiliations ==
NCAA

- Central Intercollegiate Athletic Association (1957–present)

== Varsity teams ==
The Vikings also sponsor a cheerleading team. The program sponsored a baseball team until the end of the 2013–14 season, when the sport was suspended in hopes of a 2017–18 return.

Men's sports	Women's sports
Basketball	Basketball
Cross country	Bowling
Football	Cross country
Golf	Softball
	Tennis
	Volleyball

== Notable alumni ==
=== Football ===
- Tim Cofield
- Bobby Futrell
- Larry Johnson
- Reggie Langhorne
- Everett McIver
- Jethro Pugh
- John Walton

=== Men's basketball ===
- Mike Gale
- Anthony Hilliard
