= Jarrad Weeks =

Australian basketball player

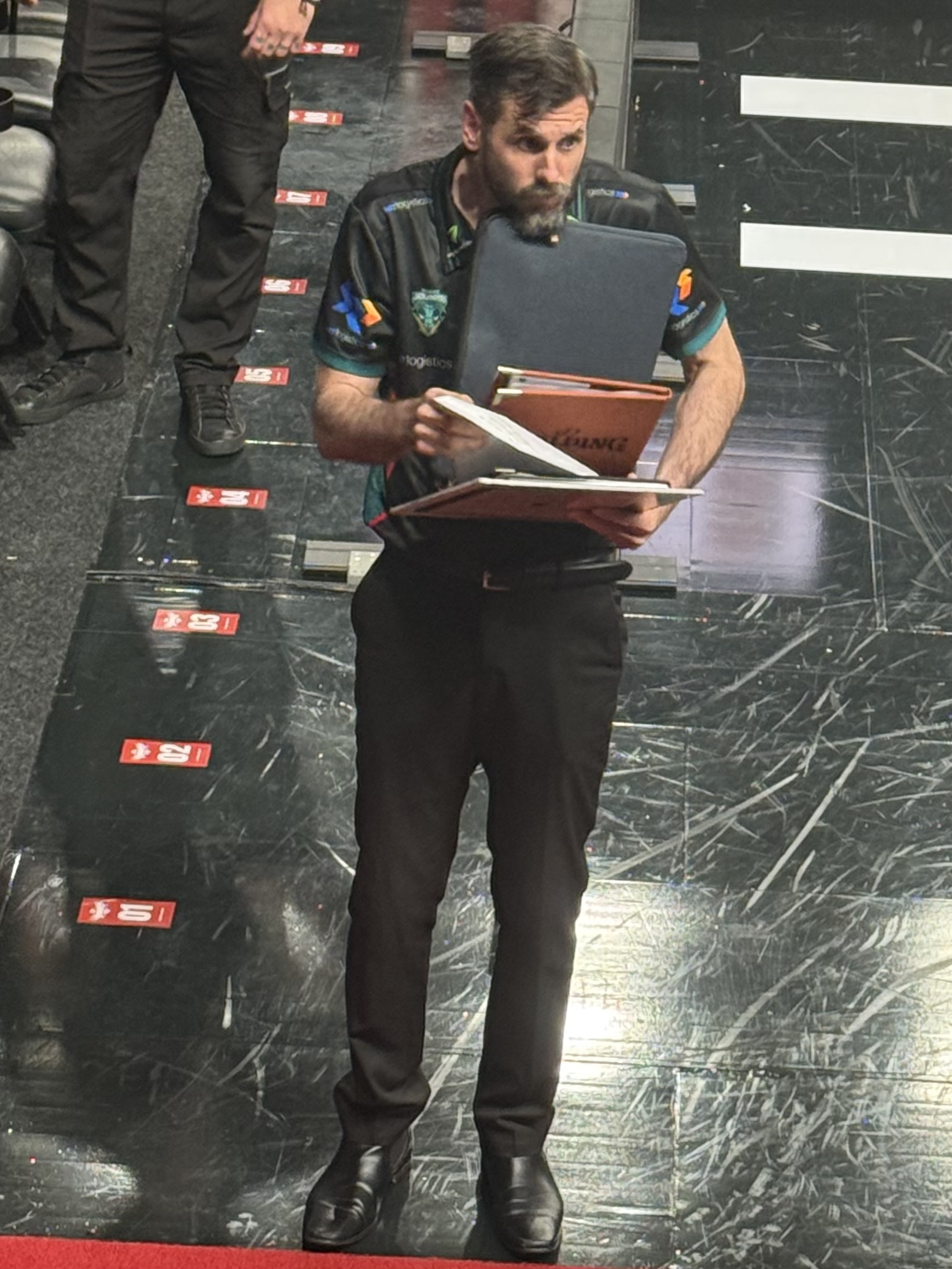
- Weeks with the Tasmania JackJumpers in 2025

Tasmania JackJumpers
- Title: Assistant coach
- League: NBL

Personal information
- Born: 11 July 1989 (age 37) Melbourne, Victoria, Australia
- Listed height: 183 cm (6 ft 0 in)
- Listed weight: 80 kg (176 lb)

Career information
- High school: Barker College (Sydney, New South Wales)
- Playing career: 2009–2023
- Position: Point guard
- Coaching career: 2023–present

Career history

Playing
- 2009–2011: Hornsby Spiders
- 2010–2014: Sydney Kings
- 2012–2014: Norths Bears
- 2014–2015: Ehingen Urspring
- 2015–2016: Illawarra Hawks
- 2016: Hobart Chargers
- 2016–2018: Cairns Taipans
- 2017: Cairns Marlins
- 2018–2019: Southland Sharks
- 2018–2021: New Zealand Breakers
- 2021: Sydney Kings
- 2021–2023: Tasmania JackJumpers
- 2023: Auckland Tuatara

Coaching
- 2023–present: Tasmania JackJumpers (assistant)
- 2025–2026: Hobart Chargers

Career highlights
- As player: NZNBL champion (2018); 2× NZNBL All-Star Five (2018, 2023); NZNBL Most Outstanding Guard (2023); Waratah League champion (2012); As assistant coach: NBL champion (2024)

Jarrad Weeks (born 11 July 1989) is an Australian basketball coach and former player who is an assistant coach for the Tasmania JackJumpers of the National Basketball League (NBL).

== Early life ==
Weeks was born in Melbourne, Victoria. He attended Barker College in Sydney, New South Wales.

== Professional career ==
=== NBL and Germany ===
In 2010, Weeks joined the Sydney Kings of the National Basketball League (NBL). He played two games in 2010–11 and made no appearances in 2011–12. He then played 10 games in 2012–13 and 12 games in 2013–14.

For the 2014–15 season, Weeks played for Ehingen Urspring in the German ProA. In 27 games, he averaged 11.9 points, 2.1 rebounds, 2.6 assists and 1.2 steals per game.

Weeks returned to the NBL for the 2015–16 season, joining the Illawarra Hawks initially as an injury replacement player. He then played for the Cairns Taipans in 2016–17 and 2017–18.

On 23 April 2018, Weeks signed with the New Zealand Breakers on a two-year deal. On 5 March 2020, he signed a one-year extension with the Breakers for the 2020–21 NBL season. In May 2021, he parted ways with the Breakers and joined the Sydney Kings for the rest of the season.

On 14 July 2021, Weeks signed with the Tasmania JackJumpers on a two-year deal.

On 4 June 2023, Weeks announced his retirement from the NBL.

=== State Leagues and New Zealand NBL ===
Between 2009 and 2014, Weeks played in the Waratah League, first for the Hornsby Spiders (2009–11) and then the Norths Bears (2012–14). He won a championship with the Bears in 2012.

In 2016, Weeks played for the Hobart Chargers in the South East Australian Basketball League (SEABL). He then played for the Cairns Marlins of the Queensland Basketball League in 2017.

In 2018, Weeks played for the Southland Sharks of the New Zealand National Basketball League (NZNBL). He helped the Sharks win the championship and earned All-Star Five honours. He returned to the Sharks in 2019. He was set to return for a third season in 2020 but the Sharks withdrew from the season due to the COVID-19 pandemic.

Week joined the Auckland Tuatara for the 2023 New Zealand NBL season.

== National team career ==
On 17 February 2019, Weeks was called up by head coach Andrej Lemanis to be a part of the Australia national basketball team for the upcoming FIBA World Cup qualifiers against Kazakhstan and Iran. Weeks played in both games.

== Coaching career ==
On 6 June 2023, Weeks was appointed an assistant coach of the Tasmania JackJumpers for the 2023–24 NBL season. He served as a special advisor to the Hobart Chargers of the NBL1 South in the 2024 NBL1 season. He then returned to the JackJumpers as an assistant for the 2024–25 NBL season. On 12 March 2025, he re-signed with the JackJumpers as an assistant until the end of the 2026–27 season.

Weeks served as head coach of the Hobart Chargers men's team in the 2025 NBL1 South season and the 2026 NBL1 South season. He was not retained following the 2026 season.

== Personal life ==
Weeks and his wife Michelle have two children.
