= Anthony Hilliard =

American basketball player (born 1986)

No. 3 – Club Malvin
- Position: Shooting guard / small forward
- League: Liga Uruguaya de Básquetbol

Personal information
- Born: June 28, 1986 (age 40) Fayetteville, North Carolina, U.S.
- Listed height: 195 cm (6 ft 5 in)
- Listed weight: 92 kg (203 lb)

Career information
- High school: Seventy-First (Fayetteville, North Carolina)
- College: Elizabeth City State (2005–2009)
- NBA draft: 2009: undrafted
- Playing career: 2009–present

Career history
- 2009–2010: Verviers-Pepinster
- 2010–2011: Okapi Aalstar
- 2011–2012: Artland Dragons
- 2012–2014: Antibes Sharks
- 2014–2015: Bisons Loimaa
- 2015–2016: Tsmoki-Minsk
- 2016: Maccabi Rishon LeZion
- 2017–2018: Enisey
- 2018–2019: Le Portel
- 2019–2020: Champville
- 2020: Benfica
- 2021: Kauhajoki Karhu
- 2021–present: Malvín
- 2022–2023: Taranaki Airs
- 2023: Urunday Universitario
- 2024: Oberá Tenis Club
- 2024: Sayago

Career highlights
- Uruguay Metro League champion (2023); Belarusian League champion (2016); Belarusian Cup winner (2016); French League Pro B champion (2013); NZNBL All-Star Five (2022); NZNBL scoring champion (2022); 2× CIAA Player of the Year (2008, 2009); 2× All-CIAA Team (2008, 2009); CIAA Tournament MVP (2007); CIAA All-Rookie Team (2006)

Anthony Montrel Hilliard (born June 28, 1986) is an American professional basketball player.

== College career ==
Hilliard played four years of college basketball for the Elizabeth City State Vikings between 2005 and 2009, where he was named the CIAA Player of the Year in 2008 and 2009.

== Professional career ==
Hilliard played his first two professional seasons in Belgium for Verviers-Pepinster (2009–10) and Okapi Aalstar (2010–11). In 2011–12, he played in Germany for the Artland Dragons. Between 2012 and 2014, he played in France for Antibes Sharks. He then played in Finland for Bisons Loimaa in 2014–15 and in Belarus for Tsmoki-Minsk in 2015–16. He won a championship in 2016 in the Belarus Premier League.

Hilliard started the 2016–17 season in Israel for Maccabi Rishon LeZion before joining Enisey in January 2017. He continued with Enisey for the 2017–18 season. He returned to France for the 2018–19 season to play for Le Portel.

On August 27, 2019, Hilliard signed with Champville SC in the Lebanese Basketball League. In January 2020, he moved to Portugal to play for Benfica.

In February 2021, Hilliard returned to Finland to play out the 2020–21 season with Kauhajoki Karhu. For the 2021–22 season, he played for Malvín of the Liga Uruguaya de Básquetbol (LUB) in Uruguay.

On May 20, 2022, Hilliard signed with the Taranaki Airs for the rest of the 2022 New Zealand NBL season. In 15 games, he averaged 26.3 points, 5.9 rebounds and 3.6 assists per game.

Hilliard returned to Malvín in Uruguay for the 2022–23 season. He re-joined the Taranaki Airs for the 2023 New Zealand NBL season.

In July 2023, Hilliard joined Urunday Universitario of the Uruguay Metropolitan League. He returned to Malvín for the 2023–24 LUB season.

In May 2024, Hilliard joined Oberá Tenis Club of the La Liga in Argentina. After six games, he joined Sayago of the Uruguay Metropolitan League. He returned to Malvín for the 2024–25 LUB season.
