= BC Uralmash Yekaterinburg =

Russian basketball club from Yekaterinburg

Uralmash Yekaterinburg
- Leagues: VTB United League
- Founded: 1960
- Arena: Palace of Sporting Games (DIVS)
- Capacity: 4,281
- Location: Yekaterinburg, Russia
- Team colors: Orange, black and green
- Head coach: Anton Yudin
- Championships: Super League 1: 2 (2022, 2023); Super League 3: 1 (2017)
- Website: bcuralmash.ru
Home	Away	Third

Uralmash Yekaterinburg are a Russian professional basketball team based in Yekaterinburg, that plays in the VTB United League. They won Russian Basketball Super League 1 championships in 2022 and 2023.

== History ==
Established in 1960, the team has history that stems back to the 1940s. Prior to a city name change, the team was known as Uralmash Sverdlovsk. FIBA Hall of Fame member Sergei Belov played for Uralmash in the 1960s, as did several other members of the senior men's Soviet Union national team over the years, such as: Nikolai Kraev, Lev Reshetnikov, Aleksandr Kandel, Viacheslav Novikov, Ivan Dvorny, Anatoly Myshkin, and Stanislav Yeryomin.

=== Super League ===
After winning the Super League 3 championship in 2016–17, Uralmash was promoted to the Super League 2 for the 2017–18 season where they finished third. They were promoted to the Super League 1 for the 2018–19 season. The team finished second in the Super League 1 in 2020–21 and then won back-to-back championships in 2021–22 and 2022–23. Evgeniy Pashutin was the team's head coach during the 2021–22 season.

=== VTB United League ===
In May 2023, Uralmash was promoted to the VTB United League. In March 2025, Uralmash won the Russian Basketball Cup.

== Honours and distinctions ==
- Russian Basketball Super League 1

(2): 2022, 2023

- Russian Basketball Super League 3

(1): 2017

- Russian Basketball Cup

(1): 2025

== Current roster ==
Note: Flags indicate national team eligibility at FIBA-sanctioned events. Players may hold other non-FIBA nationalities not displayed.

Uralmash Yekaterinburg roster
Players
Coaches

Pos.	No.	Nat.	Name	Ht.	Age
F	1	(Russia)	Smagin, Vladislav	2.00 m (6 ft 7 in)	20 – 5 March 2006
C	2	(United States)	Ellis, Octavius	2.08 m (6 ft 10 in)	33 – 10 March 1993
PG	3	(United States)	Clemons, Chris	1.75 m (5 ft 9 in)	29 – 23 July 1997
G	4	(United States)	Efianayi, David	1.88 m (6 ft 2 in)	30 – 19 December 1995
PG	11	(Russia)	Novikov, Igor	1.91 m (6 ft 3 in)	34 – 11 September 1992
F	12	(Serbia)	Tasić, Danilo	2.07 m (6 ft 9 in)	33 – 15 June 1993
F	13	(Russia)	Volkhin, Igor	1.99 m (6 ft 6 in)	28 – 30 October 1997
F	15	(United States)	Douglas, Javonte	2.03 m (6 ft 8 in)	33 – 28 November 1992
F	20	(United States)	Dalton, Hayden	2.03 m (6 ft 8 in)	30 – 20 June 1996
F	21	(Russia)	Popov, Kirill	2.04 m (6 ft 8 in)	28 – 21 May 1998
G	23	(Russia)	Kardanakhishvili, Anton	1.95 m (6 ft 5 in)	24 – 19 March 2002
G	24	(Russia)	Gerasimov, Timofey (C)	1.96 m (6 ft 5 in)	29 – 15 May 1997
C	25	(Russia)	Krivykh, Ilya	2.09 m (6 ft 10 in)	20 – 2 August 2006
SG	30	(Russia)	Kulagin, Mikhail	1.91 m (6 ft 3 in)	32 – 4 August 1994
C	34	(Russia)	Abramov, Daniil	2.10 m (6 ft 11 in)	20 – 19 April 2006

Head coach

- (Russia) Anton Yudin

Assistant coach(es)

- (Russia) Sergey Vasilyev
- (Russia) Dmitriy Fedyaev

Legend

- (C) Team captain
- Injured
