= Robert Loe =

New Zealand basketball player (born 1991)

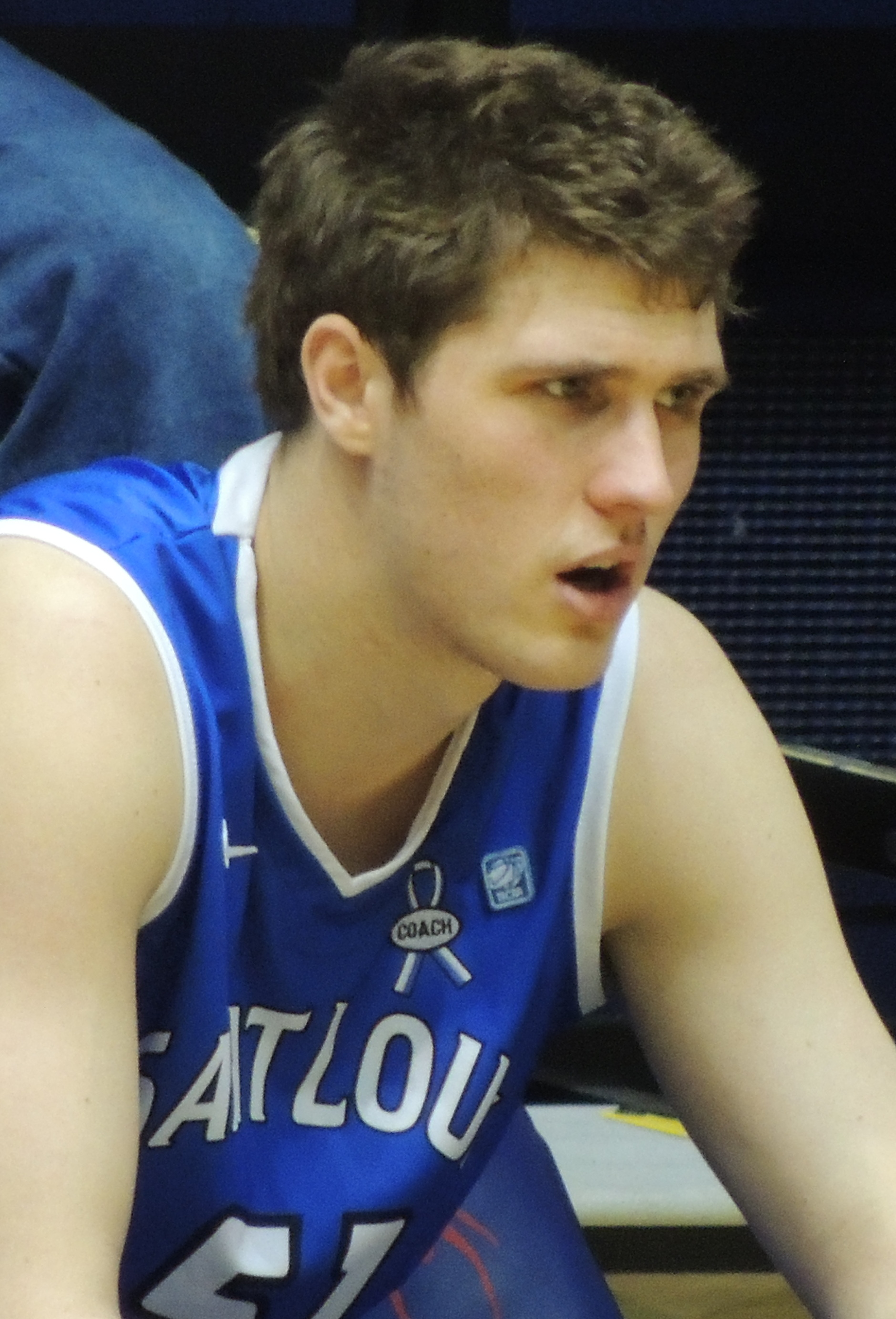
- Loe with the Saint Louis Billikens in 2013

No. 14 – Auckland Tuatara
- Position: Center / power forward
- League: NZNBL

Personal information
- Born: 5 August 1991 (age 35) Leicester, England
- Listed height: 211 cm (6 ft 11 in)
- Listed weight: 115 kg (254 lb)

Career information
- High school: Westlake Boys (Auckland, New Zealand)
- College: Saint Louis (2010–2014)
- NBA draft: 2014: undrafted
- Playing career: 2014–present

Career history
- 2014–2015: KAOD
- 2015–2016: Limburg United
- 2016–2018: New Zealand Breakers
- 2018–2019: Cairns Taipans
- 2019: Wellington Saints
- 2019–2023: New Zealand Breakers
- 2020: Kagawa Five Arrows
- 2022–present: Auckland Tuatara
- 2023–2025: Melbourne United
- 2025–2026: New Zealand Breakers

Career highlights
- NBL Ignite Cup winner (2026); NZNBL champion (2019); NZNBL Most Valuable Player (2023); 2× NZNBL All-Star Five (2023, 2024); 2× NZNBL Defensive Player of the Year (2023, 2024); NZNBL Most Outstanding Forward (2023); 4× NZNBL Most Outstanding Kiwi Forward/Centre (2019, 2022–2024); NZNBL rebounding champion (2023)
Medals
Representing New Zealand
Men's basketball
Commonwealth Games
Bronze medal – third place	2018 Gold Coast	Team competition

Robert Loe (born 5 August 1991) is a New Zealand professional basketball player for the Auckland Tuatara of the New Zealand National Basketball League (NZNBL). He played college basketball for Saint Louis University and has played in the Australian National Basketball League (NBL) since 2016. Since 2022, he has played for the Auckland Tuatara of the New Zealand NBL. He represents the New Zealand national team but also holds a British passport.

== Early life ==
Loe was born in Leicester, England. He was raised in Auckland, New Zealand, where he attended Westlake Boys High School. He helped the Westlake basketball team win two national championships. In April 2010, he was a member of the World Select Team that competed at the Nike Hoop Summit in Portland, Oregon.

== College career ==
As a freshman at Saint Louis in 2010–11, Loe averaged 6.7 points and 3.5 rebounds per game while playing in all but one game for the Billikens. He drew 18 starting assignments and was third on the squad with 20 blocks, the seventh-most by a freshman at SLU.

As a sophomore in 2011–12, Loe was one of three Billikens to start every game. He finished third on the squad with 34 made three-pointers, and blocked 17 shots during the season to rank third on the team. He averaged 5.2 points and 2.9 rebounds per game while helping the Billikens reach the 2012 NCAA Tournament.

As a junior in 2012–13, Loe was one of three Billikens to start all 35 games. He averaged 7.0 points and 3.4 rebounds, and tied for third on the squad with 29 made three-pointers.

As a senior in 2013–14, Loe started all 34 games for the Billikens. He finished third on the team in scoring with 10.3 points, led the team in blocked shots with 41 (the 10th-most in a single season at SLU), and his 88 career blocked shots finished eighth all-time at SLU. On 1 February 2014, he scored a career-high 23 points in an 87–81 overtime win over George Mason.

=== College statistics ===
Year	Team	GP	GS	MPG	FG%	3P%	FT%	RPG	APG	SPG	BPG	PPG
2010–11	Saint Louis	30	18	17.5	.389	.337	.606	3.5	.8	.5	.7	6.7
2011–12	Saint Louis	34	34	16.3	.417	.351	.630	2.9	.6	.4	.5	5.2
2012–13	Saint Louis	35	35	22.9	.419	.315	.690	3.4	1.2	.4	.3	7.0
2013–14	Saint Louis	34	34	27.7	.453	.306	.753	5.7	2.0	.9	1.2	10.3
Career		133	121	21.2	.423	.326	.696	3.9	1.2	.6	.7	7.3

== Professional career ==
After going undrafted in the 2014 NBA draft, Loe played for the Golden State Warriors in the NBA Summer League.

For the 2014–15 season, Loe moved to Greece to play for KAOD. In 26 games, he averaged 7.3 points, 4.8 rebounds and 1.2 assists per game.

For the 2015–16 season, Loe moved to Belgium to play for Limburg United. He was sidelined for two months mid season with a knee injury. In 27 games, he averaged 7.1 points, 3.4 rebounds and 1.5 assists per game.

For the 2016–17 season, Loe joined the New Zealand Breakers of the Australian National Basketball League (NBL). In 26 games, he averaged 7.1 points, 3.4 rebounds and 1.9 assists per game.

Loe returned to the Breakers for the 2017–18 NBL season. In 30 games, he averaged 7.3 points, 4.5 rebounds and 1.1 assists per game.

For the 2018–19 NBL season, Loe joined the Cairns Taipans. In 28 games, he averaged 7.6 points, 5.0 rebounds and 1.4 assists per game.

Loe played for the Wellington Saints in the 2019 New Zealand NBL season. He was named Most Outstanding Kiwi Forward/Centre and helped the Saints win the championship. In 20 games, he averaged 13.2 points, 7.7 rebounds and 2.3 assists per game.

Loe returned to the Breakers for the 2019–20 NBL season. In October 2019, he sustained a skull fracture during a game which required hospitalisation. In 20 games, he averaged 9.6 points, 4.2 rebounds and 1.8 assists per game. Following the NBL season, he had a two-game stint in Japan with the Kagawa Five Arrows.

Loe returned to the Breakers for the 2020–21 NBL season, but the team was forced to be based in Australia due to travel restrictions as a result of the COVID-19 pandemic. He spent two months away from the team back in New Zealand mid season for personal reasons. In 16 games, he averaged 6.6 points and 4.0 rebounds per game.

Loe returned to the Breakers for the 2021–22 NBL season after having off-season knee surgery. He fell out of favour with coach Dan Shamir during the season, becoming the team's third-string centre. On 15 April 2022, just hours after the Breakers parted ways with starting centre Yanni Wetzell, Loe scored a career-high 27 points in an 88–86 loss to the Tasmania JackJumpers. In 21 games, he averaged 4.2 points and 2.5 rebounds per game.

Loe played for the Auckland Tuatara in the 2022 New Zealand NBL season and helped them reach the grand final. He was named the Most Outstanding Kiwi Forward/Centre for the second time. In 21 games, he averaged 17.1 points, 11.5 rebounds, 3.4 assists, 1.7 steals and 1.0 blocks per game.

Loe re-joined the Breakers for the 2022–23 NBL season and helped them reach the grand final series. In 31 games, he averaged 5.6 points and 3.7 rebounds per game.

Loe re-joined the Tuatara for the 2023 New Zealand NBL season and helped them reach a second straight grand final. He was named the NZNBL Most Valuable Player, All-Star Five, Defensive Player of the Year, Most Outstanding Forward, Most Outstanding Kiwi Forward/Centre, and rebounding champion. In 19 games, he averaged 19.6 points, 11.1 rebounds, 4.3 assists, 1.9 steals and 1.9 blocks per game.

After initially retiring from the Australian NBL, Loe signed with Melbourne United on 28 July 2023 as a nominated replacement player for the 2023–24 NBL season. He left the team in late November after playing eight games.

Loe re-joined the Tuatara for the 2024 New Zealand NBL season, with the team going on to lose a third straight grand final. He was named All-Star Five, Defensive Player of the Year and Most Outstanding Kiwi Forward/Centre.

On 17 April 2024, Loe re-signed with Melbourne United on a one-year deal for the 2024–25 NBL season. As a 33-year-old in his 11th season as a professional, he began putting up some of the best numbers of his career. On 7 November 2024, he scored an NBL career-high 30 points with six 3-pointers in a 120–103 win over the Brisbane Bullets.

Loe re-joined the Tuatara for the 2025 New Zealand NBL season.

On 15 April 2025, Loe signed with the New Zealand Breakers for the 2025–26 NBL season, returning to the club for a third stint. In November 2025, he became the 18th player in Breakers' history to score 1,000 points for the club.

Loe re-joined the Tuatara for the 2026 New Zealand NBL season.

== National team career ==
Loe debuted for New Zealand at 2009 FIBA Under-19 World Championship. He was selected to the senior national team for the 2009 FIBA Oceania Championship. He went on to play for the Tall Blacks at the 2011 FIBA Oceania Championship, 2012 FIBA World Olympic Qualifying Tournament, 2014 FIBA Basketball World Cup, 2015 FIBA Oceania Championship, 2016 FIBA World Olympic Qualifying Tournament, FIBA Basketball World Cup 2019 Asian Qualifiers, 2019 FIBA Basketball World Cup, FIBA Asia Cup 2021 Qualifiers, and FIBA Basketball World Cup 2023 Asian Qualifiers.

In June 2023, Loe retired from the Tall Blacks.

== Personal life ==
Loe holds a British passport.

Loe and his American wife, Kelly, have a son.
