= Cameron Gliddon =

Australian basketball player (born 1989)

Auckland Tuatara
- Title: Head coach
- League: NZNBL

Personal information
- Born: 16 August 1989 (age 37) Perth, Western Australia, Australia
- Listed height: 196 cm (6 ft 5 in)
- Listed weight: 90 kg (198 lb)

Career information
- High school: Bunbury Senior (Bunbury, Western Australia)
- College: Concordia (CA) (2008–2012)
- NBA draft: 2012: undrafted
- Playing career: 2006–2024
- Position: Shooting guard
- Coaching career: 2025–present

Career history

Playing
- 2006: Bunbury Slammers
- 2007: Australian Institute of Sport
- 2009: South West Slammers
- 2012–2018: Cairns Taipans
- 2016: AZS Koszalin
- 2017: Avtodor Saratov
- 2018–2020: Brisbane Bullets
- 2019: Canterbury Rams
- 2020–2022: South East Melbourne Phoenix
- 2022–2024: New Zealand Breakers
- 2023–2024: Auckland Tuatara

Coaching
- 2025–: Auckland Tuatara

Career highlights
- NZNBL Most Outstanding Guard (2019); NZNBL All-Star Five (2019); NBL Rookie of the Year (2013); NAIA Division I champion (2012); First-team NAIA Division I All-American (2012); NAIA Division I tournament MVP (2012)
Medals
Representing Australia
Men's basketball
Commonwealth Games
Gold medal – first place	2018 Gold Coast	Team competition
FIBA Asia Cup
Gold medal – first place	2017 Lebanon

Cameron Richard Gliddon (born 16 August 1989) is an Australian basketball coach and former professional player, currently the head coach of the Auckland Tuatara in the New Zealand National Basketball League (NZNBL). He played four years of college basketball for Concordia University before returning to Australia and joining the Cairns Taipans of the National Basketball League (NBL), where he won the NBL Rookie of the Year Award in 2013. After six seasons with the Taipans, he played two seasons for the Brisbane Bullets (2018–20), two for the South East Melbourne Phoenix (2020–22), and two for the New Zealand Breakers (2022–24). He also played in Poland, Russia and the New Zealand NBL throughout his career. In September 2024, he retired from playing and was appointed head coach of the Auckland Tuatara.

== Early life and career ==
Gliddon was born in Perth, Western Australia, in the suburb of Duncraig. He grew up in Bunbury, Western Australia, where he attended Bunbury Senior High School and played in the Western Australian Basketball League (WABL).

Gliddon debuted for the Bunbury Slammers of the State Basketball League (SBL) in the 2006 season, playing five games. In 2007, he moved to Canberra to attend the Australian Institute of Sport (AIS), where he played for the AIS men's team in the South East Australian Basketball League (SEABL), averaging 7.1 points, 3.3 rebounds and 1.5 assists in 17 games. He returned to the Slammers in 2009, playing six games.

== College career ==
For the 2008–09 season, Gliddon moved to the United States to play college basketball for Concordia University. As a freshman, Gliddon finished second on the team for three-pointers made with 65. In 35 games (13 starts), he averaged 9.6 points, 2.8 rebounds, 1.7 assists and 1.3 steals per game.

As a sophomore in 2009–10, Gliddon led the GSAC for three-pointers made with 85, as he tied for sixth-most in school single-season history. In 32 games (26 starts), he averaged 10.8 points, 1.9 rebounds, 1.0 assists and 1.1 steals per game.

As a junior in 2010–11, Gliddon recorded a career-high eight made three-pointers against Concordia Chicago on 29 December 2010. In 36 games (20 starts), he averaged 9.1 points, 2.0 rebounds, 1.6 assists and 1.1 steals per game.

As a senior in 2011–12, Gliddon led the Eagles to the NAIA national championship, going on to be named the All-Tournament MVP and to the All-Tournament Team, as well as the first-team All-NAIA D1. In 38 games (all starts), he averaged 14.6 points, 3.6 rebounds, 2.3 assists and 2.0 steals per game.

== Professional career ==
=== Cairns Taipans (2012–2018) ===
==== 2012–13 season ====
On 3 May 2012, Gliddon signed a three-year deal with the Cairns Taipans of the National Basketball League. He was not well known upon signing with the Taipans but quickly developed into a key player, playing all 28 games in the 2012–13 NBL season and breaking into the starting five. He averaged 7.1 points, 4.0 rebounds and 2.8 assists and ranked third in the league for steals with 1.4 per game. He scored in double figures nine times, including scoring a career-high 26 points against the Perth Wildcats. He was subsequently named the NBL Rookie of the Year. He became the NBL's second rookie of the year from Bunbury, joining Mark Worthington (2006).

==== 2013–14 season ====
A recurring back injury sidelined Gliddon for three matches during the 2013–14 NBL season but recovered to have a strong second half of the season. He improved to 12 points per game and shot around 50 per cent from the field, and increase from 35.9 per cent in 2012–13. He was named the Taipans Club MVP, becoming the youngest player to win the award since Nathan Jawai in 2008. In 25 games, Gliddon averaged 12.1 points, 3.0 rebounds and 2.9 assists per game.

==== 2014–15 season ====
On 1 April 2014, Gliddon took up the option of the third year of his three-year contract, re-signing with the Taipans for the 2014–15 NBL season. Prior to the season, Gliddon was named team captain. He helped the Taipans clinch their first ever NBL minor premiership, finishing the regular season in first place with a 21–7 record. They went on to reach the 2015 NBL Grand Final series, where they lost 2–0 to the New Zealand Breakers. Gliddon appeared in all 32 games for the Taipans in 2014–15, averaging 10.5 points, 4.5 rebounds and 2.5 assists per game.

==== 2015–16 season ====
On 27 March 2015, Gliddon re-signed with the Taipans on a three-year deal; the contract included a European out-clause after the 2015–16 NBL season. He led the Taipans in scoring with 13.5 points per game (46 per cent) in 2015–16, and was the team's best shooter from outside (38.9 per cent) and at the charity stripe (87.5 per cent). He was subsequently named the Taipans Club MVP, becoming the third player to be named the club MVP multiple times. The Taipans missed the finals in 2015–16 after finishing with a 12–16 record.

Following the conclusion of the Taipans' season, Gliddon joined AZS Koszalin of the Polish Basketball League. In 10 games for Koszalin, he averaged 7.2 points, 3.0 rebounds and 1.3 assists per game.

==== 2016–17 season ====
Heading into the 2016–17 NBL season, Taipans coach Aaron Fearne demanded more of Gliddon in his third season as captain. During pre-season, Gliddon claimed the Ray Borner tournament MVP Medal. The Taipans returned to the finals in 2016–17 after finishing the regular season in second place with a 15–13 record. They went on to lose to the third-seeded Perth Wildcats in the semi-finals, bowing out in straight sets. Gliddon once again appeared in every game on the season, averaging 10.6 points, 3.0 rebounds, 3.1 assists and 1.2 steals in 30 contests.

Following the conclusion of the Taipans' season, Gliddon joined Russian club Avtodor Saratov of the VTB United League. He appeared in five games for Avtodor, averaging 1.4 points and 1.6 rebounds per game.

==== 2017–18 season ====
In 2017–18, Gliddon started in all 28 games and led the Taipans with an average of 12.6 points per game, scoring a total of 353 points. He led the NBL in free throws, only missing one throughout the entire season, finishing 48-from-49. Gliddon finished in the Top 13 in the NBL's MVP voting, and was named the Cairns Taipans co-MVP alongside Mitch McCarron. The Taipans missed the finals in 2017–18, finishing in sixth place with an 11–17 record.

On 28 March 2018, Gliddon parted ways with the Taipans.

=== Brisbane Bullets (2018–2020) ===
On 17 April 2018, Gliddon signed a three-year deal with the Brisbane Bullets. On 4 November 2018, he scored a career-high 30 points and hit the game-winning three-pointer with under a second left on the clock as the Bullets defeated the Adelaide 36ers 93–90. He helped the Bullets finish the regular season in fourth place with a 14–14 record, going on to lose 2–0 to the Perth Wildcats in the semi-finals despite his 18 points in game one and 10 points in game two, which was his 200th game in the NBL.

On 17 June 2020, Gliddon was released from the final year of his contract with the Bullets in mutual agreement.

=== Canterbury Rams (2019) ===
On 13 February 2019, Gliddon signed with the Canterbury Rams for the 2019 New Zealand NBL season. He was named the NBL's Most Outstanding Guard and earned All-Star Five honours. In 18 games, he averaged 14.4 points, 5.2 rebounds, 3.5 assists and 1.7 steals per game.

=== South East Melbourne Phoenix (2020–2022) ===
On 16 July 2020, Gliddon signed a two-year deal with the South East Melbourne Phoenix.

=== New Zealand Breakers and Auckland Tuatara (2022–2024) ===
On 7 June 2022, Gliddon signed a two-year deal with the New Zealand Breakers. In December 2022, he played his 300th NBL game.

Gliddon joined the Auckland Tuatara for the 2023 New Zealand NBL season. On 21 April, he scored a game-high 31 points with nine 3-pointers in a 97–77 loss to the Southland Sharks.

Gliddon returned to the Breakers for the 2023–24 NBL season. He returned to the Tuatara for the 2024 New Zealand NBL season.

On 6 September 2024, Gliddon announced his retirement after 342 NBL games. He hit 638 three-pointers throughout his career, third most in the NBL's 40-minute era, trailing only Chris Goulding and Bryce Cotton.

== National team career ==
In 2007, Gliddon represented Australia at the FIBA Under-19 World Championship in Serbia.

Gliddon was in contention for the Australian Boomers' 2016 Rio Olympics team, going on to make his debut for the senior national team in 2017 at the FIBA Asia Cup, where he won a gold medal. In 2018, he helped the Boomers win gold at the Commonwealth Games. He contributed eight points, seven rebounds and five assists in the gold medal game. In 2019, he was a member of the Boomers' FIBA World Cup team.

== Coaching career ==
On 13 September 2024, Gliddon was appointed head coach of the Auckland Tuatara for the 2025 New Zealand NBL season.

On 26 August 2025, Gliddon re-signed with the Tuatara as head coach until the end of the 2027 season.

== Personal life ==
Gliddon has one brother and two sisters.

Gliddon and his partner Sarah have two children.
