= Octavius Ellis =

American basketball player (born 1993)

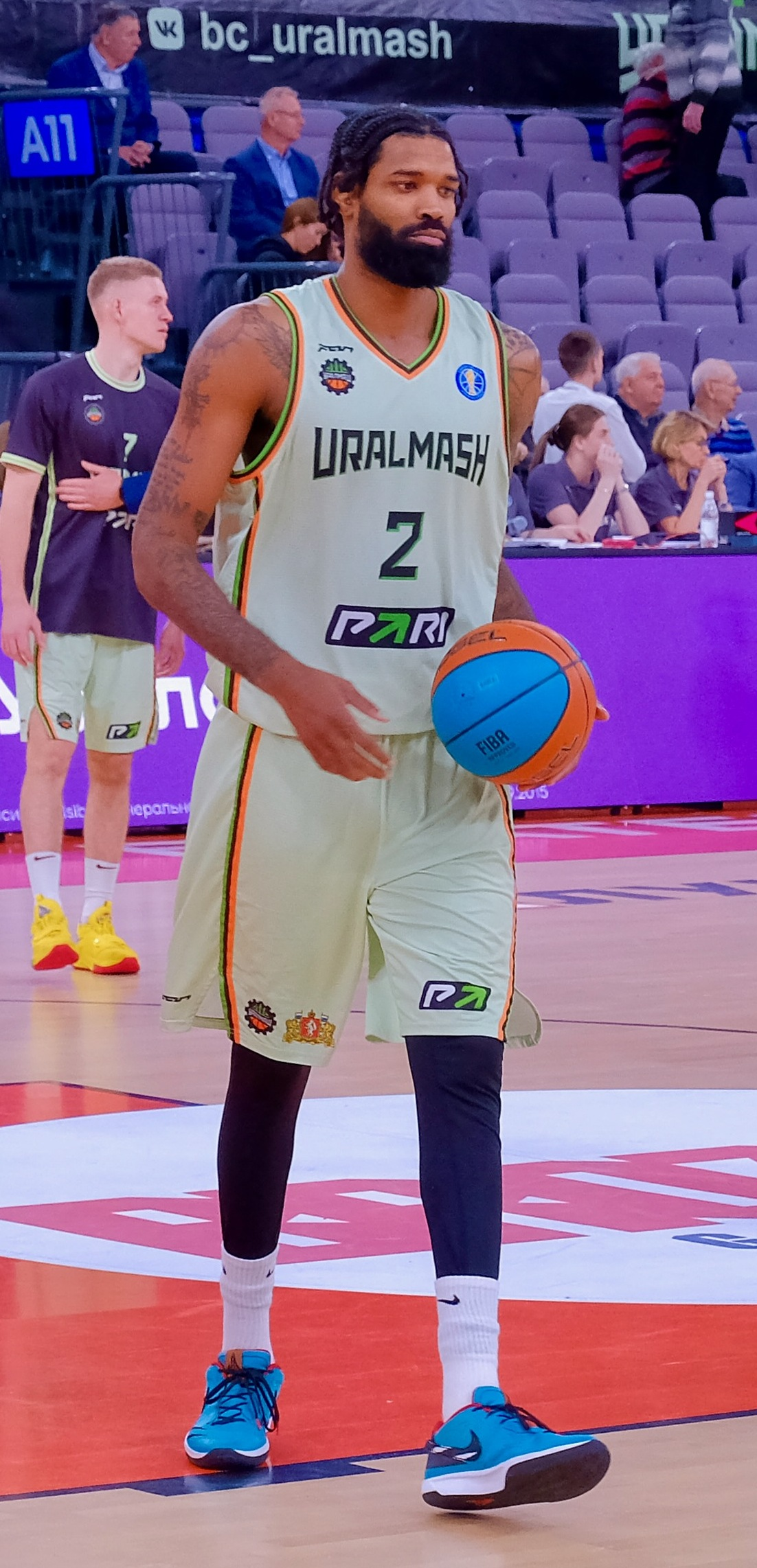

No. 2 – Uralmash Yekaterinburg
- Position: Center
- League: VTB United League

Personal information
- Born: March 10, 1993 (age 33) Memphis, Tennessee, U.S.
- Listed height: 6 ft 10 in (2.08 m)
- Listed weight: 235 lb (107 kg)

Career information
- High school: Whitehaven (Memphis, Tennessee)
- College: Cincinnati (2011–2012); Trinity Valley CC (2012–2014); Cincinnati (2014–2016)
- NBA draft: 2016: undrafted
- Playing career: 2016–present

Career history
- 2016–2017: Mornar Bar
- 2017: Enisey
- 2017–2020: Promitheas Patras
- 2020–2021: Olympiacos
- 2021–2022: Türk Telekom
- 2022–2023: Guangdong Southern Tigers
- 2023: Treviso
- 2023: Henan Golden Elephants
- 2023–present: Uralmash Yekaterinburg

Career highlights
- EuroCup blocks leader (2022); Greek All Star Game Slam Dunk Champion (2019); Second-team All-AAC (2015)

Octavius Todd Humes Ellis (born March 10, 1993) is an American professional basketball player for Uralmash Yekaterinburg of the VTB United League. Standing at 2.08 m (6 ft 10 in), he plays the power forward and center positions.

== High school career ==
Ellis played high school basketball at Whitehaven High School in Memphis, Tennessee.

== College career ==
Ellis began his collegiate career at the University of Cincinnati during the 2011–12 season. He was dismissed from the team that offseason for an altercation at a nightclub. He then played two seasons at Trinity Valley Community College in Athens, Texas. There, he averaged 14.8 points, 9.7 rebounds, and 3.2 blocked shots as a red-shirt sophomore during the 2013–14 season, while being named First Team All-America by the National Junior College Athletic Association. Ellis helped lead the Cardinals to their first NJCAA Tournament appearance since 1999, while posting a 29–7 record.

After two years at Trinity Valley, he returned to UC with two years of eligibility remaining. For that 2014–15 season, he started all 31 of the Bearcats' games, and led UC in scoring (with 10.0 points per game), in rebounding (with 7.3 per game), and in blocked shots (with 66 overall). He was named to the 2014–15 All-American Athletic Conference Second Team. The next season, he again helped lead the Bearcats to the 2016 NCAA Division I men's basketball tournament, where Cincinnati faced Saint Joseph's, and received a first-round elimination, in a controversial fashion, as Ellis' game-tying dunk was waved off for being 0.1 second too late.

== Professional career ==
After failing to be drafted in the 2016 NBA draft, Ellis signed his first professional contract with the Montenegrin team Mornar Bar, of the Adriatic League. On March 9, 2017, he signed with the Alaska Aces, as their import for the 2017 PBA Commissioner's Cup. However, on March 18, three days before the team's first game, he left the Philippines to attend to an "important family matter".

On July 24, 2017, Ellis signed with Russian club Enisey. On December 29, 2017, Ellis left Enisey and joined Promitheas Patras, of the Greek Basket League. On June 21, 2018, Ellis renewed his contract for another year with Promitheas. On May 26, 2019, Ellis agreed to a new contract with the Greek club.

On January 27, 2020, Ellis officially signed with Greek club Olympiacos of the EuroLeague. He averaged 10.2 points and 6.9 rebounds per game.

On June 27, 2021, Ellis signed with Türk Telekom of the Turkish league.

On January 18, 2023, he signed with Treviso Basket of the Lega Basket Serie A (LBA).

Ellis joined Uralmash Yekaterinburg of the VTB United League in 2023. He re-signed with the team on July 7, 2026.

== Career statistics ==
Legend
GP	Games played	GS	Games started	MPG	Minutes per game
FG%	Field-goal percentage	3P%	3-point field-goal percentage	FT%	Free-throw percentage
RPG	Rebounds per game	APG	Assists per game	SPG	Steals per game
BPG	Blocks per game	PPG	Points per game	PIR	Performance index rating
**Bold**	Career high

=== EuroLeague ===
*	Led the league

Year	Team	GP	GS	MPG	FG%	3P%	FT%	RPG	APG	SPG	BPG	PPG	PIR
2019–20	Olympiacos	7	3	**21.4**	**.767**	—	.786	**5.9**	**.6**	**1.0**	**.7**	**21.4**	**12.6**
2020–21	Olympiacos	**33**	**23**	14.3	.726*	—	**.792**	4.1	.4	.4	**.7**	5.9	8.1
Career		40	26	15.6	.735	—	.791	4.4	.4	.5	.7	6.3	8.9

== Personal life ==
Ellis is the son of Jerrell Horne, a former basketball player at the University of Memphis. His cousin is a former NBA player, Monta Ellis.
