= Javonte Douglas =

American basketball player (born 1992)

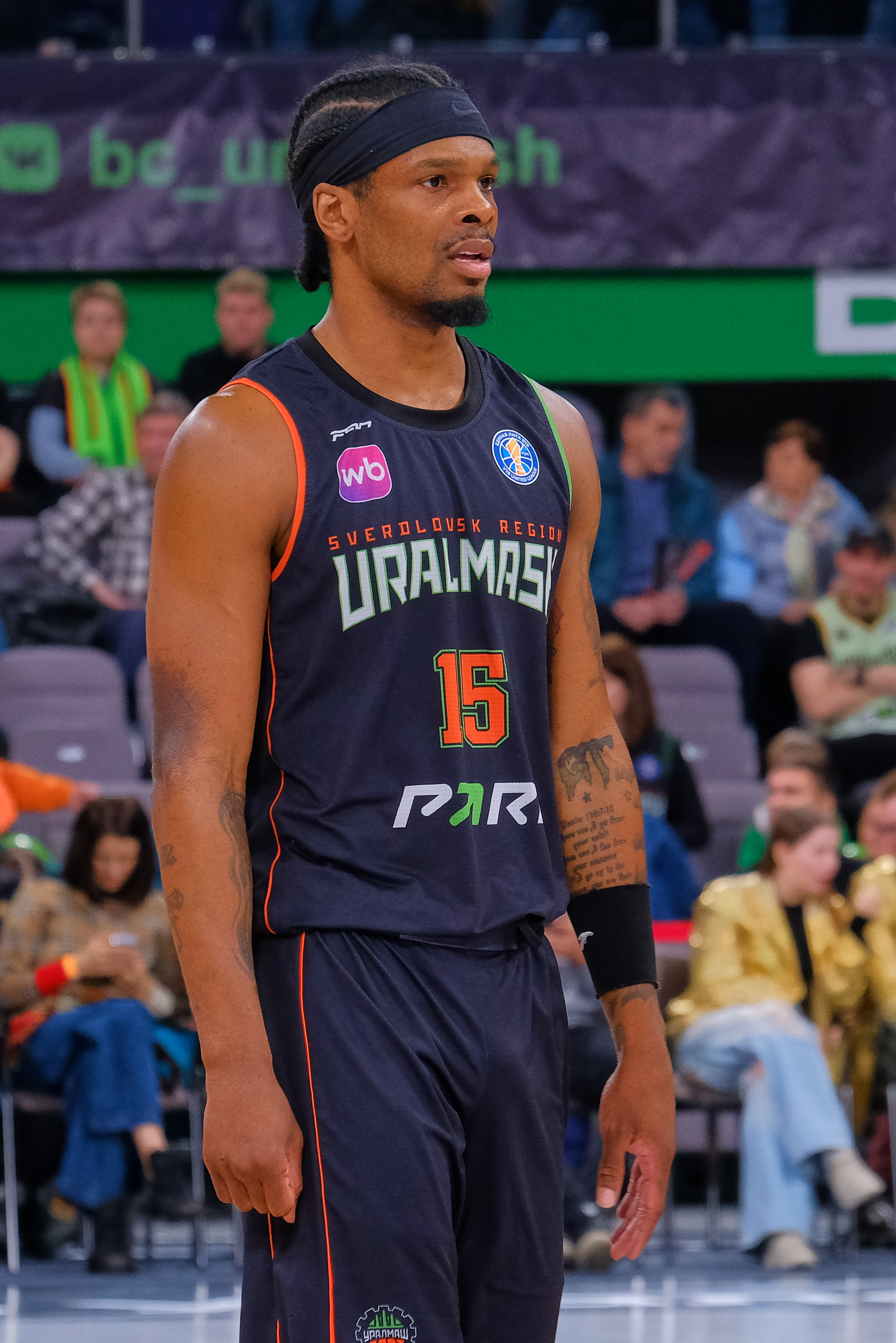
- Douglas with Uralmash Yekaterinburg in 2025

No. 15 – Uralmash Yekaterinburg
- Position: Forward
- League: VTB United League

Personal information
- Born: November 28, 1992 (age 33)
- Listed height: 203 cm (6 ft 8 in)
- Listed weight: 95 kg (209 lb)

Career information
- High school: Kennedy Charter (Charlotte, North Carolina)
- College: Hill College (2012–2013); College of Central Florida (2013–2014); Old Dominion (2014–2015); Montevallo (2016–2017)
- NBA draft: 2017: undrafted
- Playing career: 2017–present

Career history
- 2017: Sol de America Asuncion
- 2017–2018: Lefke Avrupa Universitesi
- 2018: Taranaki Mountainairs
- 2018–2020: BK Olomoucko
- 2020: BK Burevestnik Yaroslav
- 2020–present: Uralmash Yekaterinburg
- 2022: Taranaki Airs

Career highlights
- 2× Russian Super League 1 champion (2022, 2023); NZNBL All-Star Five (2022); First-team All-Peach Belt (2017); Mid-Florida Conference Player of the Year (2014); First-team All-Mid-Florida Conference (2014)

Javonte Adwin Douglas (born November 28, 1992) is an American professional basketball player for Uralmash Yekaterinburg of the VTB United League. He played four years of college basketball at four different colleges before playing professionally in Paraguay, Cyprus, New Zealand, the Czech Republic, and Russia.

== Early life ==
Douglas is a native of Charlotte, North Carolina. He attended Kennedy Charter High School in Charlotte, graduating in the spring of 2012 and averaging 17.4 points per game during his senior season.

== College career ==
As a freshman at Hill College in 2012–13, Douglas averaged 16.3 points and 6.5 rebounds per game and earned honorable mention Junior College All-American honors, first-team All-Region, and was the Conference MVP.

As a sophomore at the College of Central Florida in 2013–14, Douglas averaged 17.2 points and 9.1 rebounds per game and earned second-team Junior College All-American and Mid-Florida Conference Player of the Year.

As a junior at Old Dominion in 2014–15, Douglas played sparingly most of the season, averaging 3.6 points and 2.6 rebounds, but became a quality performer for the Monarchs at the end of the season during the National Invitation Tournament. He was subsequently considered a potential starter for the 2015–16 season. He had season highs of 16 points and nine rebounds on December 29, 2014, against Mount St. Mary's.

In June 2015, Douglas was suspended from the Monarchs basketball program after being arrested and charged with assaulting a student. Ten months earlier, he had been arrested and charged with misdemeanor assault and battery.

Douglas transferred to Montevallo and redshirted the 2015–16 season.

As a senior in 2016–17, Douglas led the Peach Belt Conference with 24.2 points and 11.3 rebounds per game to go along with a conference-leading 46.5 percent (40-of-86) shooting from beyond the arc. He was the only player nationally in the NCAA Division II to be ranked in the top 10 in both scoring and rebounding. He scored in double figures in all 22 games he played for Montevallo and posted a conference-leading 14 double-doubles. He scored a career-high 34 points against Lane College and grabbed a career-best 20 rebounds against Lander during the season. He was named Peach Belt Conference Player of the Week four times and earned first-team All-Peach Belt Conference selection and first-team NCAA Division II All-Southeast Region selection.

== Professional career ==
In May 2017, Douglas began his professional career by signing with Sol de America Asuncion in Paraguay.

For the 2017–18 season, Douglas played in Cyprus with Lefke Avrupa Universitesi. He then joined the Taranaki Mountainairs in New Zealand for the 2018 NZNBL season. He earned NZNBL Player of the Week for round one. In 13 games, he averaged 21.6 points, 10.8 rebounds and 2.5 assists per game.

For the 2018–19 season, Douglas moved to the Czech Republic to play for BK Olomoucko in the Czech NBL. In 42 games, he averaged 20.5 points, 9.7 rebounds, 3.0 assists and 1.3 steals per game. He returned to Olomoucko for the 2019–20 season, but left the team in January 2020. In 10 games, he averaged 17.3 points, 10.9 rebounds, 4.3 assists and 1.9 steals per game.

For the 2020–21 season, Douglas moved to Russia and played four games for BK Burevestnik Yaroslav in the Russian Super League 1 before joining Uralmash Yekaterinburg in December 2020. In 23 games for Uralmash, he averaged 12.7 points, 7.0 rebounds, 1.6 assists and 1.2 steals per game. He returned to Uralmash for the 2021–22 season and helped the team win the Super League 1 championship. In 36 games, he averaged 15.3 points, 8.3 rebounds, 2.4 assists and 1.3 steals per game.

In May 2022, Douglas returned to New Zealand and re-joined the Taranaki Airs for the rest of the NZNBL season. On June 25, he recorded a triple-double with 34 points, 13 rebounds and 11 assists in a 131–100 win over the Manawatu Jets. In 15 games, he averaged 19.7 points, 11.5 rebounds, 6.6 assists, 1.6 steals and 1.7 blocks per game.

In October 2022, Douglas re-joined Uralmash for the 2022–23 season. He missed eight weeks of action between November 12 and January 11 due to injury. He helped the team win back-to-back Super League 1 championships. In 24 games, he averaged 13.7 points, 7.9 rebounds, 2.7 assists and 1.2 steals per game.

On May 25, 2023, Douglas re-signed with Uralmash, now in the VTB United League, on a two-year deal. In 40 games in 2023–24, he averaged 10.2 points, 6.3 rebounds, 2.4 assists and 1.4 steals per game. In 38 games in 2024–25, he averaged 11.4 points, 6.1 rebounds, 1.7 assists and 1.2 steals per game.

On July 1, 2025, Douglas re-signed with Uralmash.

== Personal life ==
Douglas has two brothers and one sister.
