= 2023 New Zealand NBL season =

- League: New Zealand NBL
- Sport: Basketball
- Duration: 6 April – 23 July
- Games: 18
- Teams: 10

Regular season
- Minor premiers: Auckland Tuatara
- Season MVP: Robert Loe (Auckland Tuatara)
- Top scorer: Jeremy Kendle (Southland Sharks)

Finals
- Champions: Canterbury Rams
- Runners-up: Auckland Tuatara
- Grand Final MVP: Tevin Brown (Canterbury Rams)

New Zealand NBL seasons
- ← 2022 2024 →

The 2023 NBL season was the 42nd season of the National Basketball League. For the third year in a row, the league fielded 10 teams.

The regular season commenced on 6 April in Pukekohe, with the Franklin Bulls hosting the Hawke's Bay Hawks at Franklin Pool and Leisure Centre, and contained 15 weeks followed by a four-day finals schedule in July.

== Team information ==
Team	City	Arena	Colours	Head coach	Import	Import	Import
Auckland Tuatara	Auckland	Eventfinda Stadium		(New Zealand) Aaron Young	(Australia) Cameron Gliddon	(United States) Joe Lawson	(Australia) Jarrad Weeks
Canterbury Rams	Christchurch	Cowles Stadium		(New Zealand) Judd Flavell	(United States) Troy Baxter Jr.	(United States) Tevin Brown	(United States) Galin Smith
Franklin Bulls	Auckland	Franklin Pool and Leisure Centre		(United States) Daniel Sokolovsky	(United States) Jamaal Brantley	(United States) Rickey McGill	(United States) Jared Wilson-Frame
Hawke's Bay Hawks	Napier	Pettigrew Green Arena		(New Zealand) Everard Bartlett	(United States) Ira Lee	(United States) Bryce McBride	
Manawatu Jets	Palmerston North	Arena Manawatu		(New Zealand) Natu Taufale	(United States) Javion Blake	(United States) Mustapha Heron	(United States) Danny Pippen
Nelson Giants	Nelson	Trafalgar Centre		(New Zealand) Michael Fitchett	(Australia) Matur Maker	(United States) Avery Woodson	
Otago Nuggets	Dunedin	Edgar Centre		(New Zealand) Brent Matehaere	(Australia) Michael Harris	(United States) JaQuori McLaughlin	(United States) Todd Withers
Southland Sharks	Invercargill	Stadium Southland		(Australia) Guy Molloy	(Australia) Grant Anticevich	(United States) Josh Cunningham	(United States) Jeremy Kendle
Taranaki Airs	New Plymouth	TSB Stadium		(New Zealand) Trent Adam	(United States) Anthony Hilliard	(United States) Armon Fletcher	(United States) Kendrick Ray
Wellington Saints	Wellington	TSB Bank Arena		(New Zealand) Troy McLean	(Australia) Kyle Adnam	(United States) Isaiah Mucius	(United States) Elijah Thomas

== Summary ==
=== Regular season standings ===
Pos	Team	W	L	Qualification
1	Auckland Tuatara	13	5	Semi Finals
2	Otago Nuggets	12	6	Semi Finals
3	Canterbury Rams	12	6	Preliminary Finals
4	Franklin Bulls	12	6	Preliminary Finals
5	Wellington Saints	9	9	Preliminary Finals
6	Hawke's Bay Hawks	8	10	Preliminary Finals
7	Taranaki Airs	7	11	
8	Southland Sharks	6	12	
9	Nelson Giants	6	12	
10	Manawatu Jets	5	13	

Source: NZNBL

=== Finals ===
Preliminary Finals
4	Franklin Bulls	124
5	Wellington Saints	104
3	Canterbury Rams	103
6	Hawke's Bay Hawks	95

Semi Finals
1	Auckland Tuatara	92
4	Franklin Bulls	67
2	Otago Nuggets	103
3	Canterbury Rams	114

Final
Auckland Tuatara	82
Canterbury Rams	93

== Awards ==
=== Performance of the Week ===
Round	Player	Team	Ref
1	Danny Pippen	Manawatu Jets	
2	Tai Wynyard	Canterbury Rams	
3	Walter Brown	Canterbury Rams	
4	Jeremy Kendle	Southland Sharks	
5	Kyle Adnam	Wellington Saints	
6	JaQuori McLaughlin	Otago Nuggets	
7	JaQuori McLaughlin	Otago Nuggets	
8	Troy Baxter Jr.	Canterbury Rams	
9	Kyle Adnam	Wellington Saints	
10	Jeremy Kendle	Southland Sharks	
11	Robert Loe	Auckland Tuatara	
12	Dan Fotu	Franklin Bulls	
13	Avery Woodson	Nelson Giants	
14	Jeremy Kendle	Southland Sharks	
15	Jordan Ngatai	Hawke's Bay Hawks	

=== Statistics leaders ===
Stats as of the end of the regular season

Category	Player	Team	Stat
Points per game	Jeremy Kendle	Southland Sharks	24.6
Rebounds per game	Robert Loe	Auckland Tuatara	11.5
Assists per game	Jeremy Kendle	Southland Sharks	8.9
Steals per game	Rickey McGill	Franklin Bulls	2.5
Blocks per game	Robert Loe	Auckland Tuatara	2.1

=== Regular season ===
- Most Valuable Player: Robert Loe (Auckland Tuatara)
- Most Outstanding Guard: Jarrad Weeks (Auckland Tuatara)
- Most Outstanding NZ Guard: Derone Raukawa (Hawke's Bay Hawks)
- Most Outstanding Forward: Robert Loe (Auckland Tuatara)
- Most Outstanding NZ Forward/Centre: Robert Loe (Auckland Tuatara)
- Scoring Champion: Jeremy Kendle (Southland Sharks)
- Rebounding Champion: Robert Loe (Auckland Tuatara)
- Assist Champion: Jeremy Kendle (Southland Sharks)
- Most Improved Player: Charlie Dalton (Auckland Tuatara)
- Defensive Player of the Year: Robert Loe (Auckland Tuatara)
- Youth Player of the Year: Walter Brown (Canterbury Rams)
- Coach of the Year: Aaron Young (Auckland Tuatara)
- All-Star Five:
  - G: Jeremy Kendle (Southland Sharks)
  - G: Jarrad Weeks (Auckland Tuatara)
  - F: Tevin Brown (Canterbury Rams)
  - F: Todd Withers (Otago Nuggets)
  - C: Robert Loe (Auckland Tuatara)

=== Finals ===
- Grand Final MVP: Tevin Brown (Canterbury Rams)
