= Auckland Tuatara (basketball) =

Semi-professional basketball team in Auckland, New Zealand

- League: NZNBL
- Founded: December 2018
- History: Southern Huskies; 2019; Auckland Huskies; 2020–2021; Auckland Tuatara; 2022–
- Arena: Eventfinda Stadium
- Location: Auckland, New Zealand
- Team colours: Teal and navy blue
- General manager: Dale Budge
- Head coach: Cameron Gliddon
- Ownership: Regan Wood
- Championships: 0
- Website: tuatarabasketball.com

The Auckland Tuatara are a New Zealand professional men's basketball team based in Auckland. The Tuatara compete in the National Basketball League (NBL) and play their home games at Eventfinda Stadium. Founded in Tasmania in 2019 as the Southern Huskies, the team relocated to Auckland in 2020 and for two years were known as the Auckland Huskies. In December 2021, the team was purchased by the owners of the Auckland Tuatara baseball team.

== History ==
=== In Tasmania ===
In 2016, sights were set on an Australian NBL franchise returning to Tasmania. The Hobart Chargers of the South East Australian Basketball League (SEABL) wanted to be "NBL ready" in three years. In 2018, plans to get the Chargers into the Australian NBL morphed into an overarching Tasmanian bid for a proposed new franchise to be called Southern Huskies led by former Hobart Devils player, Justin Hickey. The Huskies bid ultimately fell through when Hickey failed to acquire the Derwent Entertainment Centre (DEC), compounded with the league believing there were several hurdles and shortcomings with the bid. The licence subsequently went to the South East Melbourne Phoenix for the 2019–20 season and later the Tasmania JackJumpers were accepted into the Australian NBL for the 2021–22 season.

In November 2018, reports began to surface that the Southern Huskies would be entering the New Zealand NBL in 2019, with the Huskies viewing the New Zealand league as a launch pad to the Australian NBL and the stronger competition more appealing than the various Australian state leagues. The inclusion presented a number of unprecedented challenges for the competition, with flights to Tasmania problematic for New Zealand's less financially well-off franchises, while double or triple-headers on New Zealand trips for the Huskies were a looming issue. Despite these concerns, the move had the support of the existing eight NZNBL franchises. On 5 December 2018, a five-year contract was signed between the New Zealand NBL and the Southern Huskies, marking the first time in New Zealand sporting history that an overseas team had joined a New Zealand owned league.

The 2019 New Zealand NBL season saw each New Zealand team visit Tasmania to play the Huskies at least once, while the Huskies played every New Zealand team in New Zealand as well, playing double-headers each time. As part of the agreement, the Huskies assisted with the cost for New Zealand teams to travel to Tasmania to play, with the NZNBL Board not wanting to increase the New Zealand teams' expenses through this move. The Huskies' nine home games in 2019 were split between the Derwent Entertainment Centre in Hobart and the Silverdome in Launceston. Coached by former Australian NBL player Anthony Stewart, the inaugural squad included imports Jalen Billups and Tre Nichols alongside Harry Froling, Marcel Jones, Craig Moller and Jordan Vandenberg.

The Huskies endured what was described as "shambolic" away trips across the Tasman which strained relationships between staff and players, only some of whom were being paid on time. At one stage late in the season, players threatened mutiny due to non-payment. The team concluded the 2019 season missing the post-season with a fifth-place finish and a 9–9 record.

On 27 June 2019, the Huskies announced that they would rebrand as the Tasmanian Huskies for the 2020 season in order to remove any stigma of a division within the state. This announcement came days after it was revealed that any new team from the state in the Australian NBL must be branded Tasmanian. However, on 9 August 2019, the Huskies withdrew from the New Zealand NBL after they claimed their relationship with Basketball Tasmania became untenable, with mounting debts also cited as a factor for disbanding.

==== NBL1 ====
On 17 December 2018, following the Hobart Chargers' decision to not enter the new NBL1 competition, the Southern Huskies entered the Hobart Huskies into the inaugural 2019 NBL1 season with both men's and women's teams. The teams played their NBL1 games at Kingborough Sports Centre. The Hobart Huskies were abolished after one season following the demise of the Southern Huskies.

=== In Auckland ===
In May 2020, the Southern Huskies re-emerged and relocated permanently to Auckland, New Zealand, and became the Auckland Huskies. They subsequently entered the 2020 New Zealand NBL season, a competition that was revised and modified due the COVID-19 pandemic. Coached by former Australian and New Zealand NBL player Kevin Braswell, the 2020 squad featured Leon Henry, Izayah Le'afa and Tohi Smith-Milner. The Huskies' 2020 campaign saw them lose in the second elimination final after finishing third with an 8–6 record.

For the 2021 New Zealand NBL season, the Huskies played at Eventfinda Stadium. The 2021 squad featured Justin Bibbs, Chris Johnson, Jeremy Kendle and Tom Vodanovich.

In December 2021, the owners of the Auckland Tuatara baseball team purchased the NZNBL licence from the Huskies owners and re-named the team the Auckland Tuatara. Behind the likes of Chris Johnson, Robert Loe and Dontae Russo-Nance, the Tuatara finished fifth in the 2022 regular season with a 10–8 record and went on to reach the NBL final for the first time in franchise history. In the final, they lost 81–73 to the Otago Nuggets.

In 2023, the squad was highlighted by Australian imports Cameron Gliddon and Jarrad Weeks alongside Robert Loe and Reuben Te Rangi. The Tuatara finished the regular season with a league-best 13–5 record behind Loe's MVP season. They went on to reach their second straight NBL final, where they lost 93–82 to the Canterbury Rams.

In 2024, the squad was highlighted by Corey Webster, Robert Loe, Reuben Te Rangi, Cameron Gliddon and Tom Vodanovich. The team reached their third straight NBL final, where they again lost to the Canterbury Rams, this time 102–87. The Tuatara became the first team in the 43-year history of the NBL to lose three straight grand finals.

In 2026, the Tuatara finished on top of the regular-season ladder with a 16–4 record behind Robert Loe, Tom Vodanovich, Isaac Davidson, Sean Bairstow, Josh Dilling and Chris Johnson. They went on to lose 112–69 in the semi-final against the Wellington Saints.

== Current roster ==
Note: Flags indicate national team eligibility at FIBA-sanctioned events. Players may hold other non-FIBA nationalities not displayed.

Auckland Tuatara roster
Players
Coaches

Pos.	No.	Nat.	Name	Ht.
G	1	(New Zealand)	Pohio, Daley	1.85 m (6 ft 1 in)
G	2	(New Zealand)	Wylie, Joshua	1.82 m (6 ft 0 in)
G	3	(United States)	Dilling, Josh (I)	1.93 m (6 ft 4 in)
F	4	(New Zealand)	Duncan, Noah	1.96 m (6 ft 5 in)
F/C	5	(New Zealand)	Johnson, Chris (I)	2.11 m (6 ft 11 in)
G	6	(New Zealand)	Wilson, Harper
G/F	7	(Australia)	Bairstow, Sean (I)	2.03 m (6 ft 8 in)
C	8	(New Zealand)	Kailahi-Aso, Kingston
G	9	(New Zealand)	Wilkie, Dylan	1.91 m (6 ft 3 in)
F	11	(New Zealand)	Johns, Hunter	1.90 m (6 ft 3 in)
G/F	12	(New Zealand)	Davidson, Isaac	2.02 m (6 ft 8 in)
G	13	(New Zealand)	Riley, Zach	1.96 m (6 ft 5 in)
F/C	14	(New Zealand)	Loe, Robert (C)	2.11 m (6 ft 11 in)
G	15	(New Zealand)	Ioane, Krisnan-Cole	1.93 m (6 ft 4 in)
F	25	(New Zealand)	Ochibulu, Chisom
F	26	(New Zealand)	Dalton, Matthew	1.98 m (6 ft 6 in)
G	30	(New Zealand)	Lepou, Cooper	1.83 m (6 ft 0 in)
F	32	(New Zealand)	Vodanovich, Tom	2.01 m (6 ft 7 in)
F	55	(New Zealand)	Leger, Joshua	2.03 m (6 ft 8 in)

Head coach

- (Australia) Cameron Gliddon

Assistant coach(es)

- (New Zealand) Josiah Maama
- (New Zealand) Sione Maama
- (New Zealand) Christian Ward
- (New Zealand) Josh Malolo
- (New Zealand) Orlando Lima
- (New Zealand) Isaac Billett

Legend

- (C) Team captain
- (DP) Development player
- (IN) Inactive
- (I) Import player
- Injured

- Roster
Updated: 12 July 2026

=== Notable past players ===
- (United States) Justin Bibbs
- (Australia) Cameron Gliddon
- (United States) Chris Johnson
- (United States) Jeremy Kendle
- (New Zealand) Dontae Russo-Nance
- (New Zealand) Corey Webster
- (Australia) Jarrad Weeks
