= Hartford Hawks men's basketball statistical leaders =

The Hartford Hawks men's basketball statistical leaders are individual statistical leaders of the Hartford Hawks men's basketball program in various categories, including points, rebounds, assists, steals, and blocks. Within those areas, the lists identify single-game, single-season, and career leaders. The Hawks represent University of Hartford in the NCAA Division III Conference of New England.

Hartford began competing in intercollegiate basketball in 1949. However, the school's record book does not generally list records from before the 1950s, as records from before this period are often incomplete and inconsistent. Since scoring was much lower in this era, and teams played much fewer games during a typical season, it is likely that few or no players from this era would appear on these lists anyway.

The NCAA did not officially record assists as a stat until the 1983–84 season, and blocks and steals until the 1985–86 season, but Hartford's record books includes players in these stats before these seasons. These lists are updated through the end of the 2021–22 season.

== Scoring ==
Career
| Rank | Player | Points | Seasons |
|---|---|---|---|
| 1 | Vin Baker | 2,238 | 1989–90 1990–91 1991–92 1992–93 |
| 2 | Mark Noon | 2,113 | 1975–76 1976–77 1977–78 1978–79 |
| 3 | Joe Zeglinski | 2,016 | 2006–07 2007–08 2008–09 2009–10 2010–11 |
| 4 | Peter Egan | 1,855 | 1971–72 1972–73 1973–74 1974–75 |
| 5 | Justin Bailey | 1,786 | 1995–96 1996–97 1997–98 1998–99 |
| 6 | Gary Palladino | 1,620 | 1964–65 1965–66 1966–67 |
| 7 | Aaron Cook | 1,600 | 2002–03 2003–04 2004–05 2005–06 |
| 8 | Mark Nwakamma | 1,550 | 2011–12 2012–13 2013–14 2014–15 |
| 9 | Ulysses Garcia | 1,485 | 1982–83 1983–84 1984–85 1985–86 |
| 10 | Jason Dunne | 1,458 | 2015–16 2016–17 2017–18 2018–19 |

Season
| Rank | Player | Points | Season |
|---|---|---|---|
| 1 | Vin Baker | 792 | 1992–93 |
| 2 | Vin Baker | 745 | 1991–92 |
| 3 | Gary Palladino | 657 | 1965–66 |
| 4 | Mark Noon | 616 | 1978–79 |
| 5 | Anthony Moye | 581 | 1987–88 |
| 6 | Kenny Adeleke | 579 | 2005–06 |
| 7 | Vin Baker | 569 | 1990–91 |
| 8 | Pancake Thomas | 566 | 2015–16 |
| 9 | Gary Palladino | 559 | 1966–67 |
| 10 | Ron Moye | 555 | 1990–91 |

Single game
| Rank | Player | Points | Season | Opponent |
|---|---|---|---|---|
| 1 | Gary Palladino | 45 | 1965–66 | CCNY |
| | Mark Noon | 45 | 1977–78 | Lowell |

== Rebounds ==
Career
| Rank | Player | Rebounds | Seasons |
|---|---|---|---|
| 1 | Peter Egan | 1,054 | 1971–72 1972–73 1973–74 1974–75 |
| 2 | Ken Gwozdz | 1,028 | 1966–67 1967–68 1968–69 |
| 3 | Vin Baker | 951 | 1989–90 1990–91 1991–92 1992–93 |
| 4 | Wayne Augustine | 851 | 1968–69 1969–70 1970–71 |
| 5 | Mike Bond | 708 | 1991–92 1992–93 1993–94 1994–95 |
| 6 | Larry Griffiths | 694 | 1987–88 1988–89 1989–90 1990–91 |
| 7 | Paul DaSilva | 658 | 1974–75 1975–76 1976–77 1977–78 |
| 8 | Bill Brown | 651 | 1972–73 1973–74 1974–75 1975–76 |
| 9 | John Carroll | 644 | 2014–15 2015–16 2016–17 2017–18 2018–19 |
| 10 | Morgan Sabia | 637 | 2007–08 2008–09 2009–10 2010–11 |

Season
| Rank | Player | Rebounds | Season |
|---|---|---|---|
| 1 | Ken Gwozdz | 418 | 1968–69 |
| 2 | Wayne Augustine | 385 | 1970–71 |
| 3 | Kenny Adeleke | 366 | 2005–06 |
| 4 | Ken Gwozdz | 358 | 1967–68 |
| 5 | Wayne Augustine | 327 | 1969–70 |
| 6 | Chris Calling | 303 | 1980–81 |
| 7 | Vin Baker | 302 | 1990–91 |
| 8 | Vin Baker | 300 | 1992–93 |
| 9 | Peter Egan | 299 | 1971–72 |

Single game
| Rank | Player | Rebounds | Season | Opponent |
|---|---|---|---|---|
| 1 | Ken Gwozdz | 34 | 1967–68 | Yeshiva |

== Assists ==
Career
| Rank | Player | Assists | Seasons |
|---|---|---|---|
| 1 | Charles Harding | 586 | 1971–72 1972–73 1973–74 1974–75 |
| | Mark Noon | 586 | 1975–76 1976–77 1977–78 1978–79 |
| 3 | Ron Berger | 460 | 1968–69 1969–70 1970–71 |
| 4 | Michael Griffin | 445 | 1993–94 1994–95 1995–96 1996–97 |
| 5 | John Hurlbert | 390 | 1983–84 1984–85 1985–86 1986–87 |
| 6 | J.R. Lynch | 374 | 2015–16 2016–17 2017–18 2018–19 |
| 7 | Ryan Stys | 331 | 2000–01 2001–02 2002–03 2003–04 |
| | Andres Torres | 331 | 2007–08 2008–09 2009–10 2011–12 |
| 9 | Jay Gutierrez | 320 | 1981–82 1982–83 1983–84 1984–85 |
| 10 | Jaret von Rosenberg | 310 | 2006–07 2007–08 2008–09 |

Season
| Rank | Player | Assists | Season |
|---|---|---|---|
| 1 | Ron Berger | 181 | 1969–70 |
| 2 | Ron Berger | 179 | 1970–71 |
| | Charles Harding | 179 | 1971–72 |
| 4 | Mark Noon | 172 | 1976–77 |
| 5 | Charles Harding | 163 | 1974–75 |
| 6 | Traci Carter | 162 | 2019–20 |
| 7 | Mark Noon | 148 | 1976–77 |
| 8 | Michael Griffin | 146 | 1995–96 |
| 9 | Michael Griffin | 138 | 1994–95 |
| 10 | Michael Griffin | 131 | 1996–97 |

Single game
| Rank | Player | Assists | Season | Opponent |
|---|---|---|---|---|
| 1 | Ron Berger | 15 | 1969–70 | Bridgeport |

== Steals ==
Career
| Rank | Player | Steals | Seasons |
|---|---|---|---|
| 1 | Justin Bailey | 218 | 1995–96 1996–97 1997–98 1998–99 |
| 2 | John Hurlbert | 184 | 1983–84 1984–85 1985–86 1986–87 |
| 3 | Traci Carter | 179 | 2019–20 2020–21 2021–22 |
| 4 | J.R. Lynch | 176 | 2015–16 2016–17 2017–18 2018–19 |
| 5 | Aaron Cook | 174 | 2002–03 2003–04 2004–05 2005–06 |
| 6 | Mark Noon | 168 | 1975–76 1976–77 1977–78 1978–79 |
| 7 | Michael Turner | 167 | 2006–07 2007–08 2008–09 |
| 8 | Ryan Stys | 156 | 2000–01 2001–02 2002–03 2003–04 |
| | Jaret von Rosenberg | 156 | 2006–07 2007–08 2008–09 |
| 10 | Joe Zeglinski | 153 | 2006–07 2007–08 2008–09 2009–10 2010–11 |

Season
| Rank | Player | Steals | Season |
|---|---|---|---|
| 1 | Traci Carter | 83 | 2019–20 |
| 2 | Michael Turner | 72 | 2007–08 |
| 3 | Mark Noon | 71 | 1976–77 |
| | Lamont Middleton | 71 | 1988–89 |
| 5 | J.R. Lynch | 70 | 2018–19 |
| 6 | Milton Burton | 67 | 2010–11 |
| 7 | Larry Ayers | 61 | 1976–77 |
| | Justin Bailey | 61 | 1998–99 |
| 9 | Anthony Bethune | 60 | 1996–97 |
| | Andres Torres | 60 | 2011–12 |
| | Traci Carter | 60 | 2020–21 |

== Blocks ==
Career
| Rank | Player | Blocks | Seasons |
|---|---|---|---|
| 1 | Vin Baker | 279 | 1989–90 1990–91 1991–92 1992–93 |
| 2 | Larry Griffiths | 122 | 1987–88 1988–89 1989–90 1990–91 |
| 3 | Hassan Attia | 119 | 2016–17 2017–18 |
| 4 | Steve Campbell | 89 | 1991–92 1992–93 1993–94 1994–95 |
| 5 | Morgan Sabia | 84 | 2007–08 2008–09 2009–10 2010–11 |
| 6 | Ryan Howse | 83 | 1994–95 1995–96 1996–97 1997–98 |
| 7 | Chris Eames | 78 | 1995–96 1996–97 1997–98 1998–99 |
| 8 | Mark Nwakamma | 75 | 2011–12 2012–13 2013–14 2014–15 |
| 9 | Ricardo Roderick | 71 | 1990–91 1991–92 1992–93 1993–94 |
| 10 | John Carroll | 62 | 2014–15 2015–16 2016–17 2017–18 2018–19 |

Season
| Rank | Player | Blocks | Season |
|---|---|---|---|
| 1 | Vin Baker | 100 | 1991–92 |
| 2 | Vin Baker | 74 | 1992–93 |
| 3 | Hassan Attia | 59 | 2016–17 |
| | Hassan Attia | 59 | 2017–18 |
| 5 | Vin Baker | 58 | 1990–91 |
| 6 | Warren McLendon | 53 | 2007–08 |
| 7 | Kenny Adeleke | 48 | 2005–06 |
| 8 | Vin Baker | 47 | 1989–90 |
| 9 | Larry Griffiths | 42 | 1989–90 |
| 10 | Anthony Bethune | 39 | 1996–97 |
