= 2007–08 Hartford Hawks men's basketball team =

American college basketball season

2007–08 Hartford Hawks men's basketball
- Conference: America East Conference
- Record: 18–16 (10–6 America East)
- Head coach: Dan Leibovitz (2nd season)
- Assistant coaches: John Gallagher; Chris Gerlufsen; Elliott Broadnax
- Home arena: Chase Arena at Reich Family Pavilion

2007–08 America East men's basketball standings
| | Conf. | | | | Overall |
| Team | W | | L | PCT | W | | L | PCT |
|---|---|---|---|---|---|---|---|---|
| UMBC † | 13 | – | 3 | .813 | 24 | – | 9 | .727 |
| Hartford | 10 | – | 6 | .625 | 18 | – | 16 | .529 |
| Albany | 10 | – | 6 | .625 | 15 | – | 15 | .500 |
| Vermont | 9 | – | 7 | .563 | 16 | – | 15 | .516 |
| Binghamton | 9 | – | 7 | .563 | 14 | – | 16 | .467 |
| Boston University | 9 | – | 7 | .563 | 14 | – | 17 | .452 |
| New Hampshire | 6 | – | 10 | .375 | 9 | – | 20 | .310 |
| Stony Brook | 3 | – | 13 | .188 | 7 | – | 23 | .233 |
| Maine | 3 | – | 13 | .188 | 7 | – | 23 | .233 |
† America East tournament winner As of March 17, 2008; Rankings from AP Poll

The 2007–08 Hartford Hawks men's basketball team represented the University of Hartford during the 2007–08 NCAA Division I men's basketball season. The team was coached by second year coach Dan Leibovitz. The 2007–08 season was Hartford's most successful season in the division I era, finishing second in the regular season and reaching the conference championship finals. After the season assistant coach John Gallagher would leave Hartford to take an assistant coaching position at Penn, he would return to Hartford in 2010 as head coach.

== Roster ==
2007–08 Hartford Hawks men's basketball team
Players
Coaches

| Pos. | # | Name | Height | Weight | Year | Previous school | Hometown |
|---|---|---|---|---|---|---|---|
| G | 1 | Jaret von Rosenberg | 6 ft 2 in (1.88 m) | 185 lb (84 kg) | Jr | Sharyland; Collin County | Mission, TX |
| F | 2 | Warren McLendon | 6 ft 6 in (1.98 m) | 250 lb (113 kg) | Jr | West Laurens; The Citadel | Dublin, GA |
| G/F | 3 | Michael Turner | 6 ft 5 in (1.96 m) | 215 lb (98 kg) | Jr | Marin Catholic; West Valley | Novato, CA |
| G | 5 | Tambo Barrow | 6 ft 0 in (1.83 m) | 190 lb (86 kg) | Jr | Boston Latin Academy | Boston, MA |
| G | 10 | Andres Torres | 5 ft 10 in (1.78 m) | 170 lb (77 kg) | Fr | Colegio Adianez | Guaynabo, Puerto Rico |
| G | 11 | Brian Glowiak | 6 ft 3 in (1.91 m) | 180 lb (82 kg) | Sr | New Britain | New Britain, CT |
| G | 12 | Clint Kuban | 6 ft 2 in (1.88 m) | 185 lb (84 kg) | Jr | Bethel | Bethel, CT |
| F | 15 | David Bookman | 6 ft 7 in (2.01 m) | 225 lb (102 kg) | So | Southwest | Fort Worth, TX |
| G | 22 | Rich Baker | 6 ft 1 in (1.85 m) | 180 lb (82 kg) | Sr | Montrose Christian | Frederick, MD |
| F | 23 | Morgan Sabia | 6 ft 8 in (2.03 m) | 200 lb (91 kg) | Fr | Sir Francis Drake | San Anselmo, CA |
| G | 24 | Joe Zeglinski | 6 ft 0 in (1.83 m) | 185 lb (84 kg) | So | Archbishop Ryan | Philadelphia, PA |
| F | 25 | Anthony Minor | 6 ft 6 in (1.98 m) | 200 lb (91 kg) | Fr | Plymouth Whitemarsh | Philadelphia, PA |
| F | 31 | Kevin Estes | 6 ft 7 in (2.01 m) | 230 lb (104 kg) | Fr | Benedictine | Richmond, VA |

Head coach

- Dan Leibovitz (Penn)

Assistant coach(es)

- John Gallagher (Saint Joseph's)
- Chris Gerlufsen (Randolph–Macon)
- Elliott Broadnax

Legend

- (C) Team captain
- (S) Suspended
- (I) Ineligible
- (W) Walk-on
- Injured
- Current redshirt

Roster
Last update: April 26, 2020

== Schedule ==
| Date time, TV | Rank^{#} | Opponent^{#} | Result | Record | Site (attendance) city, state |
Non-conference regular season
| Nov 9, 2007*; 7:00pm | | at St. Francis NY | L 59–62 | 0–1 | Generoso Pope Athletic Complex (515); Brooklyn, NY |
| Nov 11, 2007*; 4:00pm, NESN | | at Quinnipiac | L 79–85 | 0–2 | TD Bank Sports Center (2,218); Hamden, CT |
| Nov 14, 2007*; 7:00pm | | Sacred Heart | W 70–55 | 1–2 | Chase Arena at Reich Family Pavilion (1,512); West Hartford, CT |
| Nov 17, 2007*; 12:00pm | | at Louisville; Findlay Toyota Las Vegas Invitational | L 69–104 | 1–3 | Freedom Hall (19,147); Louisville, KY |
| Nov 20, 2007*; 9:30pm | | at BYU; Findlay Toyota Las Vegas Invitational | L 73–97 | 1–4 | Marriott Center (8,917); Provo, UT |
| Nov 23, 2007*; 6:30pm | | vs. Jackson State; Findlay Toyota Las Vegas Invitational | W 73–57 | 2–4 | Orleans Arena (4,950); Paradise, NV |
| Nov 24, 2007*; 5:00pm | | vs. South Carolina State; Findlay Toyota Las Vegas Invitational | W 80–72 ^{OT} | 3–4 | Orleans Arena (5,500); Paradise, NV |
| Nov 28, 2007*; 7:00pm | | Army | W 70–64 | 4–4 | Chase Arena at Reich Family Pavilion (1,404); West Hartford, CT |
| Dec 1, 2007*; 4:30pm | | at Long Island | L 62–86 | 4–5 | Wellness, Recreation and Athletic Center (943); Brooklyn, NY |
| Dec 8, 2007*; 3:00pm | | at North Texas | L 97–105 | 4–6 | Super Pit (2,157); Denton, TX |
| Dec 11, 2007*; 7:00pm | | Monmouth | W 67–53 | 5–6 | Chase Arena at Reich Family Pavilion (2,157); West Hartford, CT |
| Dec 14, 2007*; 7:00pm | | at Villanova | L 75–103 | 5–7 | The Pavilion (6,500); Villanova, PA |
| Dec 22, 2007*; 11:00am | | Brown | L 61–79 | 5–8 | Chase Arena at Reich Family Pavilion (2,144); West Hartford, CT |
| Dec 30, 2007*; 3:00pm | | at Virginia | L 70–78 | 5–9 | John Paul Jones Arena (11,647); Charlottesville, VA |
| Jan 5, 2008*; 7:00pm | | Yale | W 73–70 | 6–9 | Chase Arena at Reich Family Pavilion (1,064); West Hartford, CT |
America East regular season
| Jan 9, 2008; 7:00pm | | Binghamton | W 80–79 | 7–9 | Chase Arena at Reich Family Pavilion (887); West Hartford, CT |
| Jan 12, 2008; 6:00pm, NESN | | Boston University | W 66–57 | 8–9 | Chase Arena at Reich Family Pavilion (1,763); West Hartford, CT |
| Jan 16, 2008; 7:00pm | | at UMBC | L 85–86 | 8–10 | Retriever Activities Center (1,881); Catonsville, MD |
| Jan 19, 2008; 7:00pm | | Albany | L 63–73 | 8–11 | Chase Arena at Reich Family Pavilion (1,202); West Hartford, CT |
| Jan 21, 2008; 7:30pm | | at Maine | W 76–71 | 9–11 | Alfond Arena (1,186); Orono, ME |
| Jan 24, 2008; 7:00pm | | Stony Brook | W 83–81 | 10–11 | Chase Arena at Reich Family Pavilion (1,158); West Hartford, CT |
| Jan 27, 2008; 1:00pm | | at New Hampshire | L 59–74 | 10–12 | Lundholm Gym (936); Durham, NH |
| Jan 30, 2008; 8:00pm, NESN | | Vermont | L 76–81 | 10–13 | Chase Arena at Reich Family Pavilion (1,423); West Hartford, CT |
| Feb 2, 2008; 2:00pm | | at Binghamton | W 71–62 | 11–13 | Binghamton University Events Center (4,902); Vestal, NY |
| Feb 6, 2008; 7:00pm | | Maine | W 69–67 | 12–13 | Chase Arena at Reich Family Pavilion (943); West Hartford, CT |
| Feb 9, 2008; 2:00pm | | at Albany | W 68–63 | 13–13 | SEFCU Arena (3,069); Albany, NY |
| Feb 14, 2008; 7:00pm | | at Stony Brook | W 53–51 | 14–13 | Stony Brook University Arena (715); Stony Brook, NY |
| Feb 17, 2008; 2:00pm | | New Hampshire | W 82–63 | 15–13 | Chase Arena at Reich Family Pavilion (1,792); West Hartford, CT |
| Feb 20, 2008; 7:00pm | | at Vermont | L 82–94 | 15–14 | Patrick Gym (2,623); Burlington, VT |
| Feb 28, 2008; 7:00pm | | at Boston University | L 66–97 | 15–15 | Case Gym (845); Boston, MA |
| Mar 2, 2008; 2:00pm | | UMBC | W 58–57 | 16–15 | Chase Arena at Reich Family Pavilion (2,637); West Hartford, CT |
America East Men's tournament
| Mar 8, 2008; 6:00pm | (2) | (7) New Hampshire; Quarterfinals | W 68–65 | 17–15 | Binghamton University Events Center (2,831); Vestal, NY |
| Mar 9, 2008; 2:30 | (2) | (6) Boston University; Semifinals | W 59–52 | 18–15 | Binghamton University Events Center (3,024); Vestal, NY |
| Mar 15, 2008; ESPN2 | (2) | (1) UMBC; Championship | L 65–82 | 18–16 | Retriever Activities Center (3,810); Catonsville, MD |
*Non-conference game. ^{#}Rankings from AP Poll. (#) Tournament seedings in parentheses. All times are in Eastern Time.
