= 2009 New Zealand NBL season =

- League: New Zealand NBL
- Sport: Basketball
- Duration: 14 March – 25 June
- Games: 16
- Teams: 9

Regular season
- Minor premiers: Waikato Pistons
- Season MVP: Phill Jones (Nelson Giants)
- Top scorer: Mike Efevberha (Wellington Saints)

Playoffs
- Champions: Waikato Pistons
- Runners-up: Nelson Giants
- Finals MVP: Justin Bailey

New Zealand NBL seasons
- ← 2008 2010 →

The 2009 NBL season was the 28th season of the National Basketball League. Two changes occurred for the 2009 season, with the Christchurch Cougars replacing the Canterbury Rams, and the Otago Nuggets also withdrawing. The Waikato Pistons won the championship in 2009 to claim their fourth league title.

== Summary ==
=== Regular season standings ===
Pos
Pos	Team	W	L
1	Waikato Pistons	14	2
2	Nelson Giants	12	4
3	Wellington Saints	12	4
4	Christchurch Cougars	10	6
5	Harbour Heat	9	7
6	Hawke's Bay Hawks	7	9
7	Manawatu Jets	4	12
8	Auckland Stars	4	12
9	Taranaki Dynamos	0	16

=== Playoff bracket ===
Quarterfinals
4	Christchurch Cougars	106
5	Harbour Heat	98
3	Wellington Saints	80
6	Hawke's Bay Hawks	75

Semifinals
1	Waikato Pistons	96
4	Christchurch Cougars	89
2	Nelson Giants	83
3	Wellington Saints	82

Finals
Waikato Pistons	81	94	–
Nelson Giants	69	84	–

== Awards ==
=== Player of the Week ===
Round	Player	Team	Ref
1	Mike Efevberha	Wellington Saints	
2	Corey Webster	Harbour Heat	
3	Thomas Abercrombie	Waikato Pistons	
4	Jarryd Loyd	Nelson Giants	
5	Mike Efevberha	Wellington Saints	
6	Phill Jones	Nelson Giants	
7	Paora Winitana	Christchurch Cougars	
8	Marcel Jones	Manawatu Jets	
9	Damon Thornton	Wellington Saints	
10	Mychal Green	Harbour Heat	
11	Tim Behrendorff	Christchurch Cougars	
12	Mike Efevberha	Wellington Saints	
13	Thomas Abercrombie	Waikato Pistons	
14	Mike Efevberha	Wellington Saints	

=== Statistics leaders ===
Stats as of the end of the regular season

Category	Player	Team	Stat
Points per game	Mike Efevberha	Wellington Saints	27.8
Rebounds per game	Jamil Terrell	Manawatu Jets	10.3
Assists per game	Paul Henare	Christchurch Cougars	6.5
Steals per game	Mychal Green	Harbour Heat	3.2
Blocks per game	Damon Thornton	Wellington Saints	1.9

=== Regular season ===
- Most Valuable Player: Phill Jones (Nelson Giants)
- NZ Most Valuable Player: Phill Jones (Nelson Giants)
- Most Outstanding Guard: Mike Efevberha (Wellington Saints)
- Most Outstanding NZ Guard: Phill Jones (Nelson Giants)
- Most Outstanding Forward: Thomas Abercrombie (Waikato Pistons)
- Most Outstanding NZ Forward/Centre: Thomas Abercrombie (Waikato Pistons)
- Scoring Champion: Mike Efevberha (Wellington Saints)
- Rebounding Champion: Jamil Terrell (Manawatu Jets)
- Assist Champion: Paul Henare (Christchurch Cougars)
- Rookie of the Year: Thomas Abercrombie (Waikato Pistons)
- Coach of the Year: Dean Vickerman (Waikato Pistons)
- All-Star Five:
  - G: Mike Efevberha (Wellington Saints)
  - G: Phill Jones (Nelson Giants)
  - F: Thomas Abercrombie (Waikato Pistons)
  - F: Adam Ballinger (Waikato Pistons)
  - C: Tim Behrendorff (Christchurch Cougars)

=== Playoffs ===
- Finals MVP: Justin Bailey (Waikato Pistons)
