= John Gallagher (basketball) =

American basketball player and coach

Current position
- Title: Head coach
- Team: Manhattan
- Conference: MAAC
- Record: 37–62 (.374)

Biographical details
- Born: May 27, 1977 (age 49)

Playing career
- 1996–1999: Saint Joseph's

Coaching career (HC unless noted)
- 1999–2003: La Salle (assistant)
- 2003–2006: Lafayette (assistant)
- 2006–2008: Hartford (asst. HC)
- 2008–2010: Penn (assistant)
- 2010: Boston College (assistant)
- 2010–2022: Hartford
- 2023–present: Manhattan

Head coaching record
- Overall: 206–269 (.434)
- Tournaments: 0–1 (NCAA); 0–2 (CIT); 0–1 (CBI)

Accomplishments and honors

Championships
- America East tournament (2021)

Awards
- America East Co-Coach of the Year (2018)

John Michael Gallagher (born May 27, 1977) is the head men's basketball coach at Manhattan University. He previously served as the head coach at the University of Hartford from 2010 until 2022.

== Career ==
=== Assistant coach ===
Gallagher started his coaching career working as an assistant at Lafayette College and La Salle University. From 2006 to 2008 Gallagher worked as associate head coach under Dan Leibovitz, helping the Hawks to their first appearance in the America East Championship game in 2008. Hartford lost the game to UMBC 64–50. Gallagher left Hartford in 2008, and spent two years as an assistant coach under Glen Miller with the Penn Quakers. He then briefly worked as an assistant under Steve Donahue at Boston College, a position he held for less than two weeks before being offered the head coaching job at Hartford.

=== Hartford ===
==== 2010–11 season ====
In his first season at the helm, Gallagher guided the Hawks to an 11–20 record, going 7–9 in league play. In the America East Tournament, Hartford upset third-seeded Maine to make an appearance in the semifinals.

==== 2011–12 season ====
In 2011–12, Gallagher and the Hawks struggled in the early season with a roster featuring seven freshman, going 0-13 before finishing the year 9–9 on its way to a 9–22 record. The Hawks made the America East Tournament semifinals once again after defeating Boston University, before falling in double-overtime to Vermont for a place in the conference final.

==== 2012–13 season ====
The 2012–13 season saw Gallagher guide the Hawks to a 17–12 record in the regular season, earning a fourth-place finish in the America East. After falling to UMBC in the America East Championship quarterfinals, Hartford accepted a bid to the 2013 CIT, losing to Rider in the first round. This was the program's first postseason appearance since its move to Division I.

==== 2017–18 season ====
On January 31, 2018 Gallagher earned his 100th victory as coach of Hartford with a 79–62 win over New Hampshire, and on February 28, 2018 Gallagher was named America East Co-Coach of the year. Hartford returned to the CIT Tournament falling to San Diego in the first round. After the 2017–2018 season Gallagher signed a contract extension.

==== 2020–21 season ====
During the 2020–21 season, Gallagher led the Hawks to the America East tournament championship, defeating UMass Lowell 64–50 earning an automatic berth in the NCAA tournament for the first time in school history. Hartford would fall to eventual national champion Baylor in the first round.

==== Sudden resignation prior to 2022–23 ====
On November 7, 2022, just one day before Hartford was scheduled to start the 2022–23 season (its final year as a Division I member), Gallagher resigned unexpectedly. In his letter, Gallagher said the school had consistently undermined the program “to the point where player safety and well-being has been jeopardized.” He cited a preseason scrimmage at Dartmouth in late October, when one of his players was injured and wasn’t immediately helped because the school did not send an athletic trainer with the team. The university initially disputed the claims of player safety.

=== Manhattan ===
On March 29, 2023 Gallagher was named the head coach at Manhattan.

== Head coaching record ==
Record table
Season	Team	Overall	Conference	Standing	Postseason
Hartford Hawks (America East Conference) (2011–2022)
2010–11	Hartford	11–20	7–9	6th	
2011–12	Hartford	9–22	7–9	6th	
2012–13	Hartford	17–14	10–6	4th	CIT First Round
2013–14	Hartford	17–16	10–6	3rd	
2014–15	Hartford	14–16	7–9	5th	
2015–16	Hartford	10–23	4–12	T–7th	
2016–17	Hartford	9–23	4–12	7th	
2017–18	Hartford	19–14	11–5	3rd	CIT First Round
2018–19	Hartford	18–15	10–6	4th	
2019–20	Hartford	18–15	9–7	3rd	NCAA Division I Cancelled
2020–21	Hartford	15–9	8–6	4th	NCAA Division I Round of 64
2021–22	Hartford	12–20	9–9	T–5th	
Hartford:		169–207 (.449)	96–96 (.500)		
Manhattan Jaspers (MAAC) (2023–2026)
2023–24	Manhattan	7–23	4–16	10th	
2024–25	Manhattan	17–14	12–8	T–4th	CBI First Round
2025–26	Manhattan	12–20	8–12	10th	
Manhattan Jaspers (Metro Conference) (2026–present)
2026–27	Manhattan	1–5	0–0		
Manhattan:		37–62 (.374)	24–36 (.400)		
Total:		206–269 (.434)			
National champion Postseason invitational champion Conference regular season champion Conference regular season and conference tournament champion Division regular season champion Division regular season and conference tournament champion Conference tournament champion

== Personal life ==
Gallagher graduated from Saint Joseph's University in 1999, where he played basketball under head coach Phil Martelli.
