= Justin Bailey (basketball) =

American basketball player (born 1977)

Personal information
- Born: June 10, 1977 (age 49) New Brunswick, New Jersey, U.S.
- Listed height: 188 cm (6 ft 2 in)
- Listed weight: 80 kg (176 lb)

Career information
- High school: Piscataway Township (Piscataway, New Jersey)
- College: Hartford (1995–1999)
- NBA draft: 1999: undrafted
- Playing career: 1999–2012
- Position: Point guard / shooting guard
- Coaching career: 2020–present

Career history

Playing
- 1999: Levallois
- 2000–2001: Belenenses
- 2002: Sacil HLB Pavia
- 2005: FC Porto
- 2006–2007: West Sydney Razorbacks
- 2007: Otago Nuggets
- 2007: Correcaminos UAT Victoria
- 2007–2008: Astana Tigers
- 2008–2009: Sibirtelecom Lokomotiv Novosibirsk
- 2009: Waikato Pistons
- 2010: Sundsvall Dragons
- 2012: Harbour Heat

Coaching
- 2020; 2022: Otago Nuggets (assistant)
- 2025: Auckland Tuatara (assistant)

Career highlights
- As player: NZNBL champion (2009); NZNBL Finals MVP (2009); Kazakhstani League champion (2008); Kazakhstani Cup champion (2008); Portuguese League All-Star (2001); Second-team All-America East (1999); First-team All-North Atlantic (1998); North Atlantic All-Rookie Team (1996); As coach: 2× NZNBL champion (2020, 2022)

Justin Bailey (born June 10, 1977) is an American basketball coach and former player. He played college basketball for Hartford before playing overseas for 13 years as a professional in Europe, Australia, New Zealand, Mexico, Kazakhstan and Russia.

== High school career ==
Bailey was born in New Brunswick, New Jersey and grew up in nearby Piscataway, where he attended Piscataway Township High School, leading the school's basketball team to a 23–2 record and a Group IV state championship as a junior in 1993–94.

== College career ==
Bailey began his college career in 1995–96, joining the Hartford Hawks as a freshman. He averaged 12.1 points and 3.2 rebounds in 28 games in his first season, earning himself North Atlantic Conference All-Rookie Team honors.

As a sophomore playing for the Hawks in 1996–97, Bailey was considered the team's super-sub after a preseason ankle injury moved him to the bench. In 28 games on the season, Bailey averaged 12.9 points and 3.3 rebounds per game.

As a junior in 1997–98, Bailey earned first-team All-North Atlantic Conference honors after averaging 20.1 points and 5.0 rebounds in 27 games. In addition, he led the league in free throw percentage (83.8) and steals (2.19) in 1997–98.

As co-captain his senior year in 1998–99, Bailey earned second-team All-America East Conference honors after averaging 20.1 points and 4.4 rebounds in 27 games. He scored 1,086 combined points as a junior and senior, and with his 20-point-per-game average both years, he became only the second player to do so in consecutive seasons in the Division I era. He finished his career third all-time in scoring (1,786 points) and is among Hartford's top ten in nine different career statistical categories. Included are the top spot in free throws made (501), free throw percentage (.831) and steals (218).

In 2009, Bailey was inducted into Hartford's Athletics Hall of Fame.

=== College statistics ===
| Year | Team | GP | GS | MPG | FG% | 3P% | FT% | RPG | APG | SPG | BPG | PPG |
|---|---|---|---|---|---|---|---|---|---|---|---|---|
| 1995–96 | Hartford | 28 | | | .441 | .344 | .777 | 3.2 | 2.5 | 1.8 | .2 | 12.1 |
| 1996–97 | Hartford | 28 | | | .473 | .421 | .807 | 3.3 | 2.5 | 1.7 | .2 | 12.9 |
| 1997–98 | Hartford | 27 | | | .503 | .360 | .838 | 5.0 | 3.2 | 2.2 | .1 | 20.1 |
| 1998–99 | Hartford | 27 | | | .439 | .324 | .872 | 4.4 | 2.2 | 2.3 | .1 | 20.1 |
| Career | | 110 | | | .465 | .362 | .831 | 4.0 | 2.6 | 2.0 | .2 | 16.2 |

== Professional career ==
=== Europe ===
Bailey began his professional career in France, playing nine games for Levallois between September 4 and October 23, 1999.

Bailey's next stint came during the 2000–01 season in Portugal with Belenenses, where he averaged 26.8 points, 3.8 rebounds and 5.9 assists per game.

In January 2002, Bailey moved to Italy to play for Sacil HLB Pavia. In 20 games to finish the 2001–02 season, he averaged 9.4 points, 2.6 rebounds, 2.3 assists and 1.9 steals per game.

In March 2005, after a three-year hiatus from basketball, Bailey returned to Portugal to play out the 2004–05 season with FC Porto. He averaged 8.4 points, 3.2 rebounds, 4.0 assists and 1.6 steals in nine regular-season games and 12.6 points, 2.9 rebounds, 4.1 assists and 2.4 steals in seven playoff games.

=== Australia and New Zealand ===
On July 31, 2006, Bailey signed with the West Sydney Razorbacks for the 2006–07 NBL season. During preseason, he suffered a knee strain in a freakish accident on a golf course. He subsequently missed the first two games of the regular season. In late December, he missed a two-game North Queensland road trip due to an ankle injury. He appeared in 29 of the Razorbacks' 33 games in 2006–07, averaging 14.9 points, 3.5 rebounds, 2.9 assists and 1.5 steals in 30.9 minutes per game. The Razorbacks finished the season in last place with a 5–28 record.

Following the conclusion of the Razorbacks' season, Bailey moved to New Zealand to play for the Otago Nuggets in the 2007 New Zealand NBL season. The Nuggets finished last with a 2–16 record, as Bailey appeared in all 18 games, averaging 23.9 points, 4.8 rebounds, 3.0 assists and 2.4 steals per game.

=== Mexico, Kazakhstan and Russia ===
Bailey began the 2007–08 season in Mexico with Correcaminos UAT Victoria, but left after four games. He moved to Kazakhstan to play for Astana Tigers and helped the team win the Kazakhstani Cup and the Kazakhstani League championship. They won the League Finals series 3–1, with Bailey scoring 25 points in Game 1 of the best-of-five series.

Bailey spent the 2008–09 season in Russia playing for Sibirtelecom Lokomotiv Novosibirsk, averaging 11.5 points, 3.2 rebounds, 2.8 assists and 2.1 steals in 18 games.

=== Second New Zealand stint ===
Bailey returned to New Zealand for the 2009 NBL season, joining the Waikato Pistons. He helped the Pistons reach the NBL Finals, where they defeated the Nelson Giants 2–0 with Bailey earning Finals MVP honors after recording 32 points and six assists in Game 2. He appeared in all 19 games for the Pistons in 2009, averaging 19.5 points, 4.0 rebounds, 3.8 assists and 2.7 steals per game.

=== Sweden ===
In January 2010, Bailey signed with Swedish team Sundsvall Dragons for the rest of the 2009–10 season. He averaged 6.3 points, 2.1 rebounds, 1.6 assists and 1.1 steals in 16 regular-season games and 5.5 points, 1.3 rebounds and 1.0 steals in four playoff games.

=== Final season ===
In 2012, Bailey returned to New Zealand for one final season, this time joining the Harbour Heat. He won Player of the Week honors for Round 10 after scoring a season-high 33 points on May 2 against the Manawatu Jets, and 18 points on May 5 also against the Jets. The Heat finished in last place with a 3–13 record. He appeared in all 16 games, averaging 18.1 points, 3.4 rebounds, 3.9 assists and 2.1 steals per game.

== Post-playing career ==
In 2016, Bailey returned to New Zealand and was appointed team manager of the New Zealand Breakers. The following year, he played for the Super City Rangers' pre-season squad. He later became a mathematics teacher at Long Bay College in Auckland.

Bailey served as an assistant coach with the Otago Nuggets during the 2020 New Zealand NBL season, helping them win the championship. He returned to the Nuggets as an assistant in 2022 and helped guide them to another championship. That same year, he served as an assistant coach with the New Zealand under-18 team.

Bailey joined the Auckland Tuatara as an assistant coach for the 2025 New Zealand NBL season. He was initially slated to re-join the Tuatara as assistant for the 2026 season, but was ultimately not part of the coaching staff list at the start of the season.

== Personal life ==
Bailey and his wife Liz have a son.
