= 2025–26 Manhattan Jaspers men's basketball team =

American college basketball season

2025–26 Manhattan Jaspers men's basketball
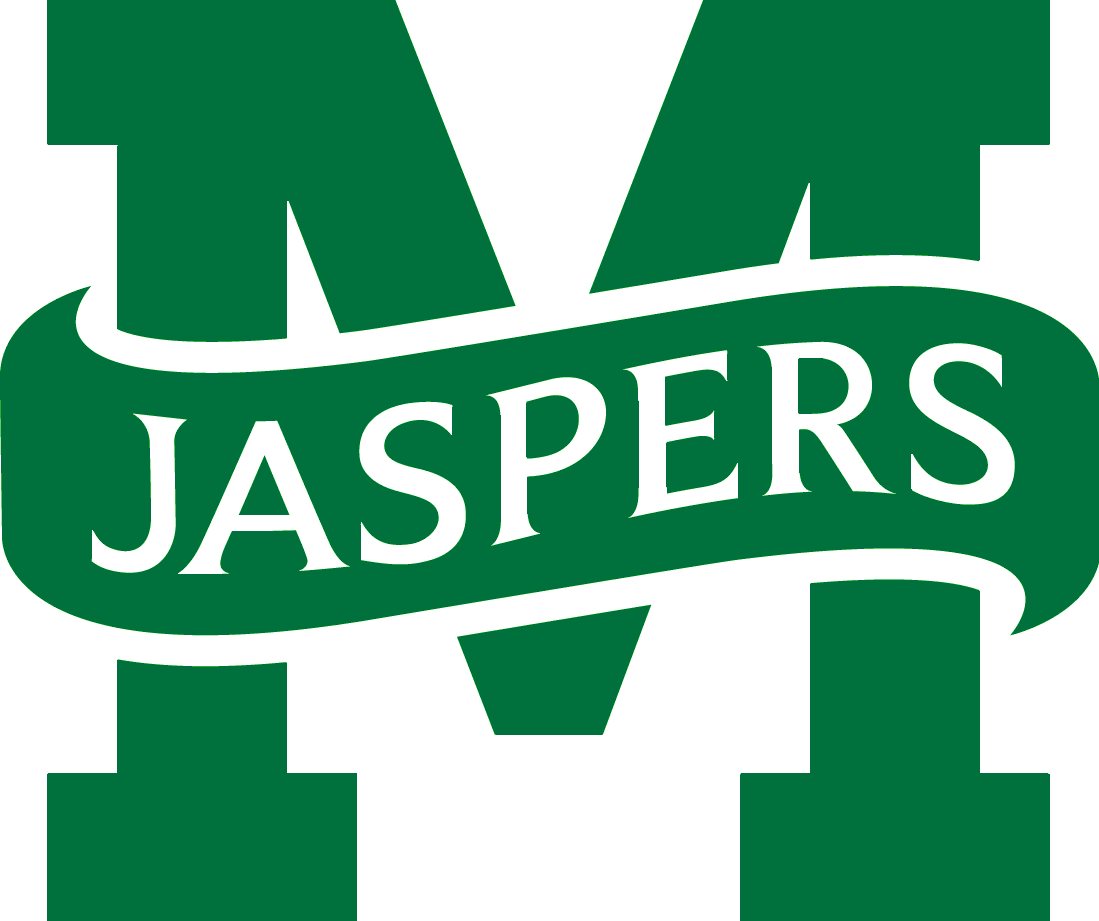
- Conference: Metro Atlantic Athletic Conference
- Record: 12–20 (8–12 MAAC)
- Head coach: John Gallagher (3rd season)
- Associate head coach: JR Lynch
- Assistant coaches: Anthony Doran; Andrew Wisniewski; Tommy Dempsey
- Home arena: Draddy Gymnasium

2025–26 MAAC men's basketball standings
	Conf.				Overall
Team	W		L	PCT	W		L	PCT
Merrimack	17	–	3	.850	21	–	10	.677
Saint Peter's	14	–	6	.700	17	–	11	.607
Siena	13	–	7	.650	20	–	11	.645
Quinnipiac	12	–	8	.600	19	–	12	.613
Marist	12	–	8	.600	18	–	11	.621
Mount St. Mary's	11	–	9	.550	15	–	16	.484
Fairfield	11	–	9	.550	20	–	12	.625
Iona	10	–	10	.500	18	–	14	.563
Sacred Heart	9	–	11	.450	14	–	18	.438
Manhattan	8	–	12	.400	12	–	20	.375
Niagara	5	–	15	.250	8	–	22	.267
Canisius	5	–	15	.250	10	–	21	.323
Rider	3	–	17	.150	4	–	25	.138
† 2026 MAAC tournament winner As of March 5, 2026

The 2025–26 Manhattan Jaspers men's basketball team represented Manhattan University during the 2025–26 NCAA Division I men's basketball season. The Jaspers, led by third-year head coach John Gallagher, played their home games at Draddy Gymnasium in Riverdale, New York as members of the Metro Atlantic Athletic Conference.

== Previous season ==
The Jaspers finished the 2024–25 season 17–14, 12–8 in MAAC play, to finish in a tie for fourth place. They were defeated by Iona in the quarterfinals of the MAAC tournament. They received an invitation to the CBI, where they would fall to Incarnate Word in the first round.

== Preseason ==
On September 30, 2025, the MAAC released their preseason coaches poll. Manhattan was picked to finish fourth in the conference.

=== Preseason rankings ===
MAAC Preseason Poll
Place	Team	Points
1	Quinnipiac	158 (8)
2	Siena	152 (3)
3	Sacred Heart	140 (2)
4	Manhattan	133
5	Marist	115
6	Iona	104
7	Merrimack	85
8	Fairfield	74
9	Mount St. Mary's	69
10	Rider	59
11	Saint Peter's	48
12	Niagara	26
13	Canisius	20
(#) first-place votes

=== Preseason All-MAAC Teams ===
Preseason All-MAAC Teams
Team	Player	Position	Year
First	Devin Dinkins	Guard	Junior
First	Will Sydnor*	Forward	Sophomore
(*) Unanimous selection

== Roster ==
2025–26 Manhattan Jaspers men's basketball team
Players
Coaches

Pos.	#	Name	Height	Weight	Year	Previous school	Hometown
G	0	Devin Dinkins	5 ft 10 in (1.78 m)	165 lb (75 kg)	RS Jr	George Mason	Washington, D.C.
F	1	Anthony Isaac	6 ft 6 in (1.98 m)	—	Jr	Blinn College	Brooklyn, New York
G	2	Jaden Winston	6 ft 0 in (1.83 m)	160 lb (73 kg)	Jr	DeMatha Catholic High School	South Laurel, Maryland
F	3	Fraser Roxburgh	6 ft 7 in (2.01 m)	215 lb (98 kg)	So	Waverley Falcons	Melbourne, Australia
G	4	Brett Rumpel	6 ft 4 in (1.93 m)	190 lb (86 kg)	RS Sr	St. Bonaventure	Binghamton, New York
G	5	Erik Oliver-Bush	6 ft 5 in (1.96 m)	200 lb (91 kg)	So	Saint Anselm	Trenton, New Jersey
G	6	Jaeden Robley	6 ft 5 in (1.96 m)	172 lb (78 kg)	Fr	St. Thomas More School	San Diego, California
G/F	7	Louis Fairtlough	6 ft 6 in (1.98 m)	200 lb (91 kg)	RS Fr	C.A. Queluz	Lisbon, Portugal
G	8	Aryan Arora	6 ft 1 in (1.85 m)	190 lb (86 kg)	GS	IMG Academy	Tuxedo Park, New York
F	9	Will Sydnor	6 ft 8 in (2.03 m)	210 lb (95 kg)	So	The Patrick School	Bronx, New York
G	10	Quron Elliott	6 ft 2 in (1.88 m)	—	Fr	Mount Zion Prep	Baltimore, Maryland
F	11	Michael Lawlor	6 ft 8 in (2.03 m)	210 lb (95 kg)	RS Jr	Eastchester High School	Eastchester, New York
G	12	Jameson Borodawka	5 ft 10 in (1.78 m)	160 lb (73 kg)	Fr	Holderness School	Tyngsborough, Massachusetts
G	13	Omari Moore	6 ft 1 in (1.85 m)	165 lb (75 kg)	Fr	Hudson Catholic High School	Plainfield, New Jersey
F	21	Marko Ljubicic	6 ft 10 in (2.08 m)	224 lb (102 kg)	So	KK Cedevita Junior	Zagreb, Croatia
G	22	Terrance Jones	6 ft 3 in (1.91 m)	180 lb (82 kg)	GS	Norfolk State	Trenton, New Jersey
G	23	Jackson Delaney	6 ft 5 in (1.96 m)	205 lb (93 kg)	Jr	Rhode Island College	Suffern, New York
G/F	24	Nick Lukmann	6 ft 4 in (1.93 m)	190 lb (86 kg)	Fr	Pascack Hills High School	Montvale, New Jersey
G	35	Asier Miguel	6 ft 4 in (1.93 m)	—	Fr	Real Madrid B	Fuenlabrada, Spain

Head coach

- John Gallagher (Saint Joseph's)

Assistant coach(es)

- JR Lynch (Hartford)
- Anthony Doran (St. John's)
- Andrew Wisniewski (Centenary)
- Tommy Dempsey (Binghamton)

Legend

- (C) Team captain
- (S) Suspended
- (I) Ineligible
- (W) Walk-on
- Injured
- Current redshirt

Roster
Last update: November 11, 2025

== Schedule and results ==
Date time, TV	Rank^{#}	Opponent^{#}	Result	Record	Site (attendance) city, state
Exhibition
October 25, 2025*; 2:00 pm		at Monmouth	L 62–81	–	OceanFirst Bank Center (551); West Long Branch, NJ
Regular season
November 4, 2025*; 7:00 pm, ESPN+		St. Joseph's Brooklyn	W 125–59	1–0	Draddy Gymnasium (717); Riverdale, NY
November 9, 2025*; 6:00 pm, B1G+		at USC	L 83–114	1–1	Galen Center (4,378); Los Angeles, CA
November 12, 2025*; 9:30 pm		vs. Utah Tech; OUTRIGGER Rainbow Classic	W 79–75	2–1	Stan Sheriff Center; Honolulu, HI
November 14, 2025*; 11:59 pm, ESPN+		at Hawai'i; OUTRIGGER Rainbow Classic	L 56–86	2–2	Stan Sheriff Center (4,296); Honolulu, HI
November 15, 2025*; 9:30 pm		vs. Mississippi Valley State; OUTRIGGER Rainbow Classic	W 80–73	3–2	Stan Sheriff Center; Honolulu, HI
November 21, 2025*; 8:00 pm, SECN+		at Texas A&M	L 68–109	3–3	Reed Arena (7,545); College Station, TX
November 26, 2025*; 5:00 pm, ESPN+		Wagner	L 101–103 ^{OT}	3–4	Draddy Gymnasium (1,312); Riverdale, NY
November 29, 2025*; 1:00 pm, ESPN+		at Army	L 78–81 ^{OT}	3–5	Christl Arena (950); West Point, NY
December 5, 2025; 7:00 pm, ESPN+		Fairfield	W 70–66	4–5 (1–0)	Draddy Gymnasium (547); Riverdale, NY
December 7, 2025; 2:00 pm, ESPN+		at Marist	L 68–80	4–6 (1–1)	McCann Arena (1,356); Poughkeepsie, NY
December 13, 2025*; 2:00 pm, ESPN+		at Fordham; Battle of the Bronx	L 53–82	4–7	Rose Hill Gymnasium (1,029); Bronx, NY
December 18, 2025*; 7:00 pm, ESPN+		Furman	L 68–75	4–8	Draddy Gymnasium (576); Riverdale, NY
December 21, 2025*; 2:00 pm, ESPN+		Presbyterian	W 87–81	5–8	Draddy Gymnasium (461); Riverdale, NY
December 29, 2025; 7:00 pm, ESPN+		at Rider	W 74–71	6–8 (2–1)	Alumni Gymnasium (1,234); Lawrenceville, NJ
January 2, 2026; 7:00 pm, ESPN+		Quinnipiac	W 80–79	7–8 (3–1)	Draddy Gymnasium (1,417); Riverdale, NY
January 4, 2026; 12:00 pm, ESPN+		at Merrimack	L 66–73	7–9 (3–2)	Lawler Arena (427); North Andover, MA
January 9, 2026; 7:00 pm, ESPN+		Canisius	L 64–70	7–10 (3–3)	Draddy Gymnasium (565); Riverdale, NY
January 11, 2026; 2:00 pm, ESPN+		Niagara	W 79–70	8–10 (4–3)	Draddy Gymnasium (721); Riverdale, NY
January 14, 2026; 7:00 pm, ESPN+		at Fairfield	L 62–98	8–11 (4–4)	Leo D. Mahoney Arena (1,228); Fairfield, CT
January 17, 2026; 2:00 pm, ESPN+		Siena	L 59–74	8–12 (4–5)	Draddy Gymnasium (1,063); Riverdale, NY
January 19, 2026; 2:00 pm, ESPN+		at Quinnipiac	L 92–98 ^{OT}	8–13 (4–6)	M&T Bank Arena (1,731); Hamden, CT
January 24, 2026; 7:00 pm, ESPN+		at Iona	L 57–66	8–14 (4–7)	Hynes Athletics Center (2,103); New Rochelle, NY
January 30, 2026; 7:00 pm, ESPN+		Rider	W 95–90	9–14 (5–7)	Draddy Gymnasium (722); Riverdale, NY
February 1, 2026; 2:00 pm, ESPN+		at Mount St. Mary's	L 65–72	9–15 (5–8)	Knott Arena (2,725); Emmitsburg, MD
February 5, 2026; 7:00 pm, ESPN+		Saint Peter's	L 75–80	9–16 (5–9)	Draddy Gymnasium (683); Riverdale, NY
February 7, 2026; 2:00 pm, ESPN+		Sacred Heart	W 80–68	10–16 (6–9)	Draddy Gymnasium (696); Riverdale, NY
February 13, 2026; 6:30 pm, ESPN+		at Niagara	W 76–69	11–16 (7–9)	Gallagher Center (706); Lewiston, NY
February 15, 2026; 1:00 pm, ESPN+		at Canisius	W 69–65	12–16 (8–9)	Koessler Athletic Center (551); Buffalo, NY
February 20, 2026; 7:00 pm, ESPN+		Marist	L 70–84	12–17 (8–10)	Draddy Gymnasium (743); Riverdale, NY
February 27, 2026; 7:00 pm, ESPN+		at Saint Peter's	L 65–75	12–18 (8–11)	Run Baby Run Arena (762); Jersey City, NJ
March 1, 2026; 2:00 pm, ESPN+		Iona	L 65–69	12–19 (8–12)	Draddy Gymnasium (1,900); Riverdale, NY
MAAC tournament
March 5, 2026; 8:30 pm, ESPN+	(10)	vs. (7) Fairfield; First round	L 60–71	12–20	Boardwalk Hall (1,037); Atlantic City, NJ
*Non-conference game. ^{#}Rankings from AP Poll. (#) Tournament seedings in parentheses. All times are in Eastern.
