= Sammy Zeglinski =

American basketball player (born 1988)

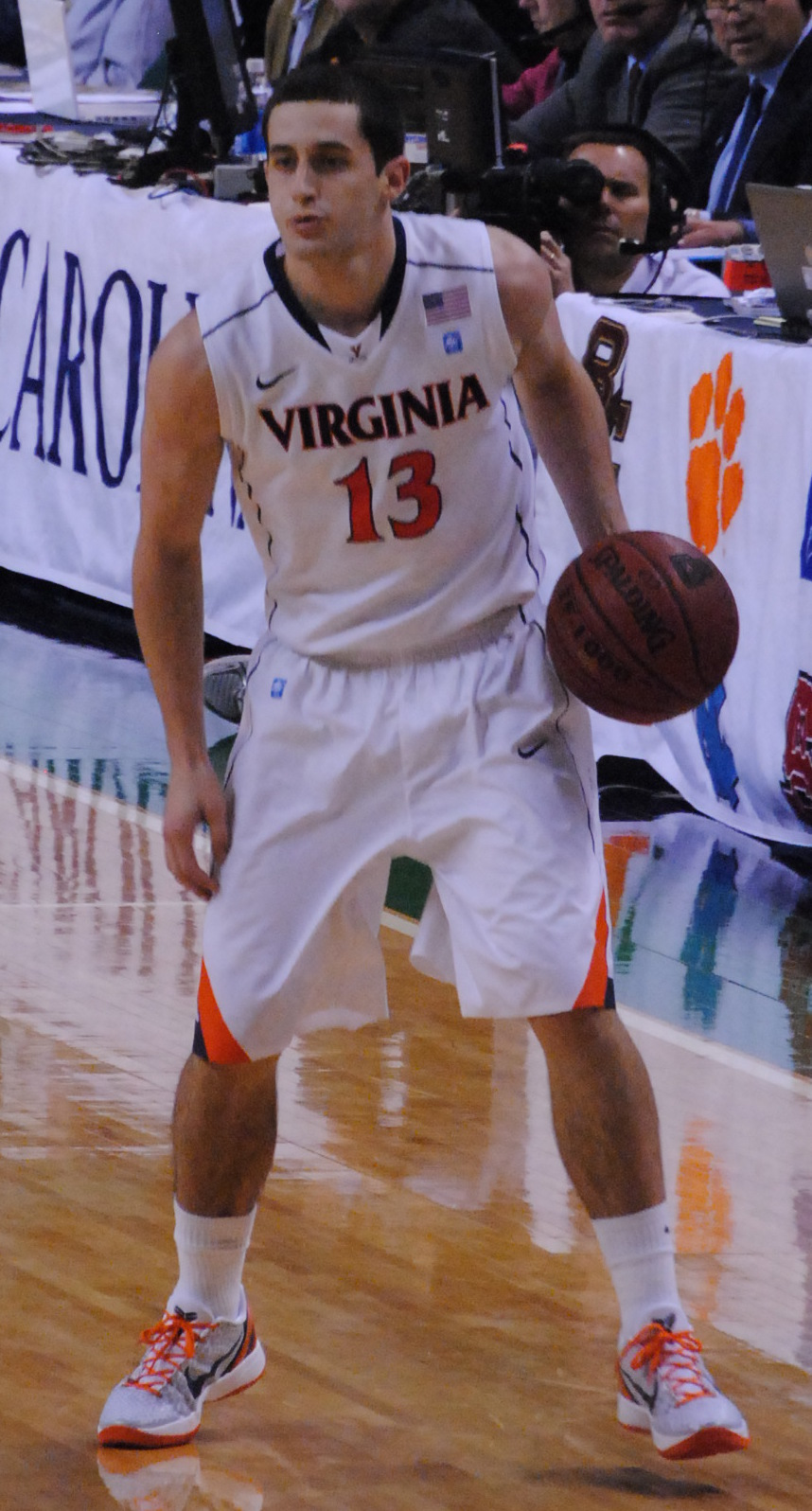

Personal information
- Born: June 16, 1988 (age 38) Philadelphia, Pennsylvania
- Listed height: 6 ft 1 in (1.85 m)
- Listed weight: 190 lb (86 kg)

Career information
- High school: William Penn (Philadelphia, Pennsylvania)
- College: Virginia (2007–2012)
- NBA draft: 2012: undrafted
- Playing career: 2012–2017
- Position: Point guard

Career history
- 2012–2013: Grindavík
- 2013–2014: Redwell Gunners Oberwart
- 2014–2015: Island Storm
- 2015–2017: Niagara River Lions
- 2017: Island Storm

Career highlights
- Icelandic champion (2013); Icelandic Supercup (2012)

Samuel Anthony Zeglinski (born June 16, 1988) is an American former basketball player. He played college basketball for the University of Virginia before going on to play professionally in Iceland, Austria and Canada. In 2013, he won the Icelandic championship as a member of Grindavík.

== High school career ==
Zeglinski attended William Penn Charter School in Philadelphia, Pennsylvania. In his junior season, he averaged 16.3 points and was named to the AP All-State Class AA second team. As a senior, Zeglinski averaged 18.9 points and was named to the All-Star Class AA first team. During his career at the high school level, he scored 1,642 points. A three-star recruit, Zeglinski was ranked the 41st best point guard nationally in the Class of 2007 and the best player of his position in Pennsylvania by Scout.com. He drew interest from the major college basketball programs of Georgia Tech, NC State, Penn State, Villanova, and Virginia Tech. However, he verbally committed to Virginia on September 25, 2005.

== College career ==
In his four years at the University of Virginia, Zeglinski ranks fifth in career three-pointers completed.

== Professional career ==
Zeglinski began his professional career in 2012 with Grindavík in the Icelandic Úrvalsdeild karla. He helped the club to win the national championship and the Supercup. The following year, he joined the Oberwart Gunners of the Österreichische Basketball Bundesliga, where he averaged 16 points, five rebounds and five assists per game. For the 2014–15 season, he signed with the Island Storm of the National Basketball League of Canada (NBL). Zeglinski remained in the league for the next season, joining the Niagara River Lions.

=== The Basketball Tournament (TBT) (2017–present) ===
In the summer of 2017, Zeglinski played in The Basketball Tournament on ESPN for the Broad Street Brawlers. He competed for the $2 million prize, and with the Brawlers, he averaged 7.8 assists per game and also shot 76 percent behind the free-throw line. Zeglinski helped the Brawlers reach the second round of the tournament, only then losing to Team Colorado 111–95.

== Personal life ==
Zeglinski grew up in Northeast Philadelphia. His brother, Joe Zeglinski, played basketball at the University of Hartford. In 2014, the Zeglinski brothers were members of the Philly Patriots in The Basketball Tournament, a 32-team five-on-five basketball tournament that had a grand prize of $500,000.
