= Tim Behrendorff =

Australian basketball player

Personal information
- Born: 26 September 1981 (age 45) Gold Coast, Queensland
- Listed height: 212 cm (6 ft 11 in)
- Listed weight: 105 kg (231 lb)

Career information
- College: Gardner–Webb (2000–2004)
- Playing career: 2004–2011
- Position: Center

Career history
- 2004–2005: Cairns Taipans
- 2005–2009: New Zealand Breakers
- 2007–2008: Harbour Heat
- 2009–2011: Wollongong Hawks
- 2009–2010: Christchurch Cougars

Timothy Behrendorff (born 26 September 1981) was an Australian professional basketball player. Behrendorff attended college at Gardner–Webb University in the United States from 2000 to 2004. He attended Trinity Lutheran College throughout his schooling years.

In the 2004–05 NBL season, he represented the Cairns Taipans before joining the New Zealand Breakers for the 2005–06 season.

He played in the New Zealand NBL from 2007 to 2010 with the Harbour Heat (2007 and 2008) and the Christchurch Cougars (2009 and 2011). In 2009, he was named to the NZNBL All-Star five.

Behrendorff played two seasons for the Wollongong Hawks in the NBL, averaging 2.4 points per game in the 2009–10 season, and 3.5 points per game in the 2010–11 season.

In 2011, Behrendorff played for the Ipswich Force of the QBL.
