= Thomas Abercrombie (basketball) =

New Zealand basketball player (born 1987)

Personal information
- Born: 5 July 1987 (age 39) Auckland, New Zealand
- Listed height: 199 cm (6 ft 6 in)
- Listed weight: 91 kg (201 lb)

Career information
- High school: Westlake Boys (Auckland, New Zealand)
- College: Washington State (2007–2008)
- NBA draft: 2009: undrafted
- Playing career: 2008–2024
- Position: Small forward / shooting guard

Career history
- 2008–2024: New Zealand Breakers
- 2009–2011: Waikato Pistons
- 2014: ASVEL Basket
- 2015: Gipuzkoa Basket
- 2016: Pınar Karşıyaka
- 2017: Büyükçekmece Basketbol
- 2019: Wellington Saints

Career highlights
- 4× NBL champion (2011–2013, 2015); 2× NZNBL champion (2009, 2019); All-NBL First Team (2012); All-NBL Third Team (2013); NBL Grand Final MVP (2011); NZNBL Grand Final MVP (2019); 3× NZNBL All-Star Five (2009–2011); NZNBL Kiwi MVP (2010); 2× NZNBL Most Outstanding Forward (2009, 2010); 2× NZNBL Most Outstanding Kiwi Forward/Centre (2009, 2010); NZNBL Rookie of the Year (2009); No. 10 retired by New Zealand Breakers
Medals
Representing New Zealand
Men's basketball
Commonwealth Games
Bronze medal – third place	2018 Gold Coast	Team competition

Thomas Iain Abercrombie (born 5 July 1987) is a New Zealand former professional basketball player who played 16 seasons in the Australian National Basketball League (NBL) for the New Zealand Breakers. A product of Westlake Boys High School in Auckland, Abercrombie had a short-lived college basketball stint with Washington State before debuting in the Australian NBL in 2008 with the Breakers. In 2011, he won his first NBL championship and earned Grand Final MVP honours. He went on to win three more championships in 2012, 2013 and 2015. He ended his NBL career in 2024 as the Breakers' most-capped player with 429 games.

Abercrombie also played four seasons in the New Zealand NBL and had stints abroad in France, Spain and Turkey.

== Early life and junior career ==
Abercrombie was born in Auckland, New Zealand, in the suburb of Takapuna. He attended Westlake Boys High School and played four years of school basketball. In 2005, he captained the basketball team to the title at the Secondary School National Championships. That year, he also served as the school's deputy head boy and was captain of the volleyball team.

As a junior, Abercrombie played for the North Harbour Basketball Association and represented New Zealand with the Junior Tall Blacks.

In November 2005, Abercrombie accepted a scholarship deal with Washington State University. He spent two seasons with the Cougars, redshirting his freshman season in 2006–07 before seeing action in 12 games in 2007–08. On 14 May 2008, Abercrombie was granted a release from the team to pursue his basketball career in New Zealand.

== Professional career ==
=== New Zealand Breakers ===
After returning home following his college stint, Abercrombie joined the New Zealand Breakers in the Australian NBL as a development player for the 2008–09 season. He played 13 games in his first season with the Breakers, and was elevated to the full squad for the 2009–10 season. He missed four games in the back half of the season with an ankle injury.

In the 2010–11 season, Abercrombie helped the Breakers reach their first ever grand final series, where they defeated the Cairns Taipans 2–1 to win their maiden NBL championship. He was subsequently named the Grand Final MVP. Abercrombie went on to win three more championships with the Breakers in 2012, 2013 and 2015.

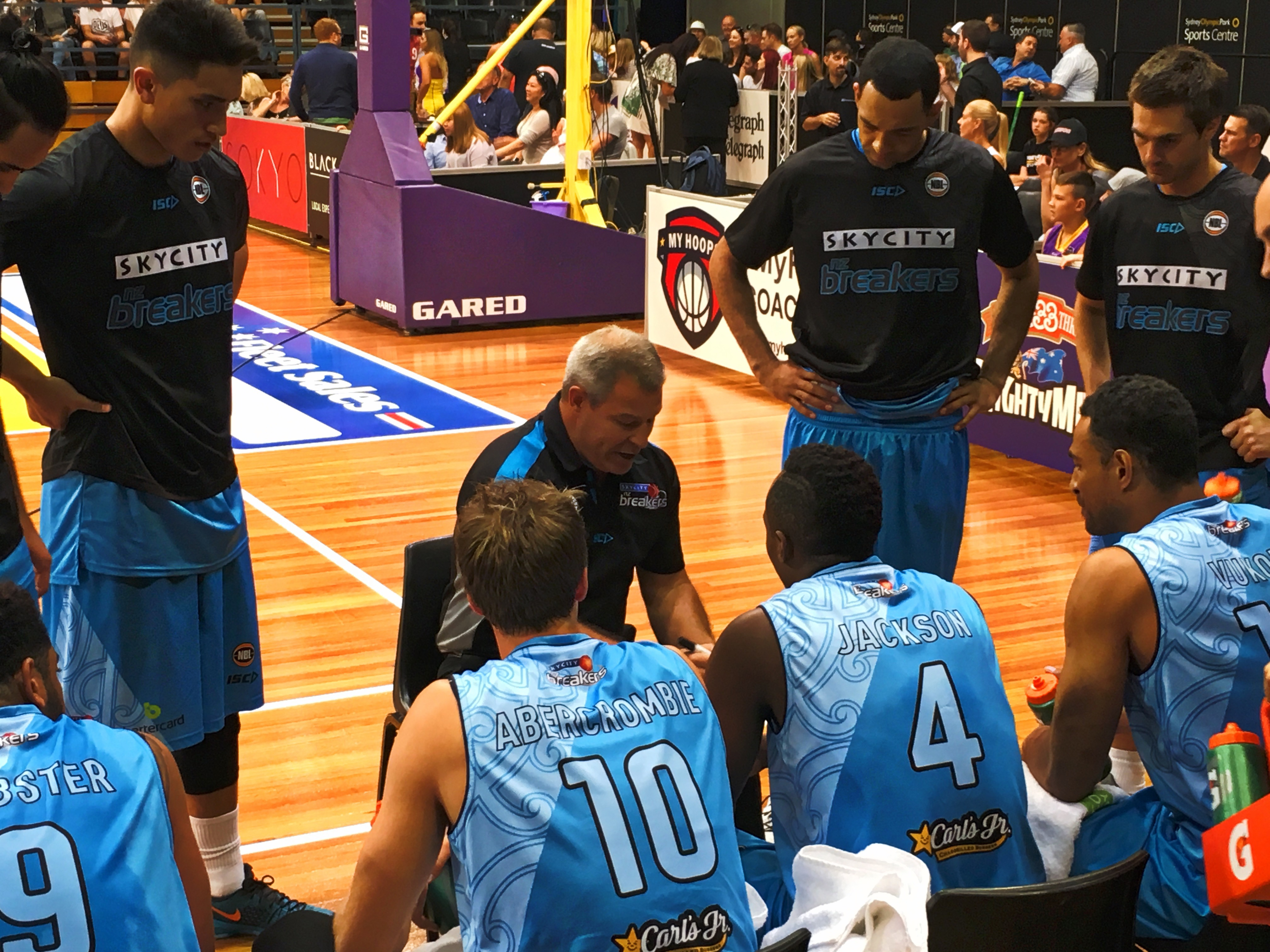
Abercrombie on the bench with the Breakers in December 2015

In January 2016, Abercrombie passed Kirk Penney as the club's all-time leading scorer. Due to Penney's return to the club for two seasons, Abercrombie had to pass him again in October 2018 to reach 3227 points in 276 games. In February 2019, he played his 300th NBL game.

In October 2019, Abercrombie committed to the Breakers until the end of the 2021–22 season.

In 2019–20, Abercrombie became the second player in NBL history (after Daniel Kickert in 2016–17 and 2017–18) to join the exclusive 50–40–90 club. Abercrombie averaged 12.1 points per game for the season while shooting 50.0 percent from the field, 46.5 percent from three-point range and 90.5 percent from the free throw line.

In April 2021, Abercrombie played his 355th game for the Breakers, surpassing Mika Vukona (354) to become the franchise's all-time games played leader. He also passed Kirk Penney (489) as the club's all-time leader in 3-pointers made.

Abercrombie missed most of the 2021–22 NBL season with a side strain and missed the first month of the 2022–23 NBL season after suffering a torn retina which required emergency surgery.

On 10 May 2023, Abercrombie re-signed with the Breakers for the 2023–24 NBL season. In September 2023, he played his 400th NBL game.

On 13 February 2024, Abercrombie announced that the 2023–24 season would be his last in the NBL. He retired with 429 career games and finished as the Breakers' most-capped player.

On 12 December 2025, the Breakers announced that the club would retire Abercrombie's number 10 jersey. The ceremony took place on 30 January 2026.

=== New Zealand NBL ===
In 2009, Abercrombie debuted in the New Zealand NBL with the Waikato Pistons. He helped the Pistons win the championship while claiming Rookie of the Year and All-Star Five honours. He continued on with the Pistons in 2010 and earned All-Star Five honours again while helping the Pistons make a second consecutive grand final appearance. He returned to the Pistons for a third season in 2011 and once again earned All-Star Five honours.

In 2019, Abercrombie played half a season with the Wellington Saints and helped them win a championship while claiming Grand Final MVP honours.

=== Overseas stints ===
During the 2013 NBL off-season, Abercrombie took part in mini-camp opportunities with NBA teams such as the San Antonio Spurs, Milwaukee Bucks, Houston Rockets and Dallas Mavericks. He then joined the Phoenix Suns for the NBA Summer League.

Following the 2013–14 NBL season, Abercrombie had a stint in France with ASVEL Basket. He went on to have similar post-NBL season stints the following three years, playing for Gipuzkoa Basket in Spain in 2015, and then having two stints in Turkey with Pınar Karşıyaka (2016) and Büyükçekmece Basketbol (2017).

== National team career ==
Abercrombie made his debut for the Tall Blacks in 2006. In 2007, he represented New Zealand at the World University Games. He played for the Tall Blacks at the 2010 FIBA World Championship and 2014 FIBA Basketball World Cup. In 2018, he won a bronze medal at the Commonwealth Games. His last appearance for the Tall Blacks came at the 2019 FIBA Basketball World Cup. He retired from international play in June 2023 after 110 appearances for the Tall Blacks.

== Post-playing career ==
Abercrombie joined the NBL commentary team for the 2024–25 season.

In March 2025, Abercrombie joined the New Zealand Breakers' new ownership group as a special advisor.

== Personal life ==
Abercrombie is the son of Colin and Judy. He has two younger siblings, brother Hayden and sister Nicola. Abercrombie and his wife Monique have three children.

Abercrombie studied a Bachelor of Science at Massey University.
