= Randy Monroe =

American college basketball coach (born 1962)

Current position
- Title: Assistant coach
- Team: Jefferson
- Conference: CACC

Biographical details
- Born: April 22, 1962 (age 64); Philadelphia, Pennsylvania, U.S.

Playing career
- ?: Philadelphia; Cheyney

Coaching career (HC unless noted)
- 1985–1987: Cheyney (assistant)
- 1988–1993: La Salle (assistant)
- 1993–1994: Vanderbilt (assistant)
- 1994–2004: UMBC (assistant)
- 2004–2012: UMBC
- 2014–2016: Brandywine HS
- 2016–2020: St. Joseph's Prep (assistant)
- 2020–present: Jefferson (assistant)

Head coaching record
- Overall: 85–159 (college)

Accomplishments and honors

Championships
- America East regular season (2008); America East tournament (2008)

Awards
- America East Coach of the Year (2008)

Randy Monroe (born April 22, 1962) is an American college basketball coach. He is currently an assistant coach at Thomas Jefferson University in Philadelphia, Pennsylvania. He is also the assistant dean of students at St. Joseph's Preparatory School, and formerly served as the school's assistant boys basketball coach. Monroe served as the head men's basketball coach at the University of Maryland, Baltimore County from 2004 to 2012. He played college basketball at Philadelphia University and Cheyney University of Pennsylvania.

== Head coaching record ==
=== College ===
Record table
Season	Team	Overall	Conference	Standing	Postseason
UMBC Retrievers (America East Conference) (2004–2012)
2004–05	UMBC	11–18	5–13	T–8th	
2005–06	UMBC	10–19	5–11	T–8th	
2006–07	UMBC	12–19	7–9	T–4th	
2007–08	UMBC	24–9	13–3	1st	NCAA Division I first round
2008–09	UMBC	15–17	7–9	6th	
2009–10	UMBC	4–26	3–13	8th	
2010–11	UMBC	5–25	4–12	9th	
2011–12	UMBC	4–26	3–13	8th	
UMBC:		85–159	48–83		
Total:		85–159			
National champion Postseason invitational champion Conference regular season champion Conference regular season and conference tournament champion Division regular season champion Division regular season and conference tournament champion Conference tournament champion
