= Kenny Adeleke =

Nigerian-American basketball player

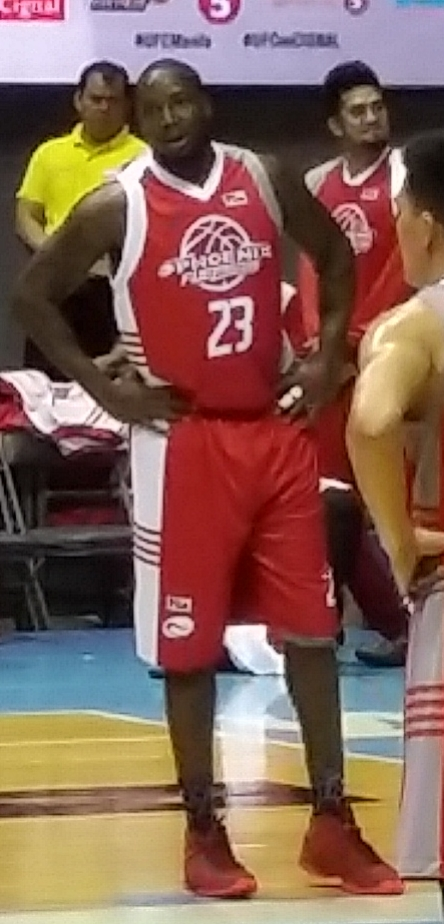
- Adeleke in 2016

Personal information
- Born: February 10, 1983 (age 43) Lagos, Nigeria
- Listed height: 6 ft 9 in (2.06 m)
- Listed weight: 240 lb (109 kg)

Career information
- High school: Paul Robeson (Brooklyn, New York)
- College: Hofstra (2001–2004); Hartford (2005–2006)
- NBA draft: 2006: undrafted
- Playing career: 2006–2018
- Position: Power forward / center

Career history
- 2006–2007: Hapoel Galil Elyon
- 2007–2008: Banvit
- 2008: PBC Lukoil Academic
- 2009: NSB Napoli
- 2010: Shanxi Zhongyu
- 2010: BC Dnipro
- 2011: Hacettepe Üniversitesi
- 2011: San Sebastián Gipuzkoa
- 2012: Cherkaski Mavpy
- 2012: Henan Jiyuan
- 2013: Springfield Armor
- 2013: Metros de Santiago
- 2013–2014: Vestelspor Manisa
- 2014–2015: Club Goes
- 2015: Trotamundos de Carabobo
- 2015–2016: Atenienses de Manatí
- 2016: Phoenix Fuel Masters
- 2016–2017: Final Gençlik
- 2017: Hekmeh
- 2017: Fuerza Regia
- 2018: CD Español de Talca
- 2018: Club Trouville

Career highlights
- CAA Rookie of the Year (2002); First-team All-CAA (2004); First-team All-America East (2006); Israeli League Rebounding Leader (2007)

Andrew Kehinde "Kenny" Adeleke (born February 10, 1983) is a Nigerian-American professional basketball player who has played 12 seasons in Europe, Asia, and Latin America. In 2006–07 he was the top rebounder in the Israel Basketball Premier League.

== High school career ==
Born in Lagos, Nigeria, Adeleke grew up in Brooklyn, New York Where he played basketball and tennis at Paul Robeson High School in Brooklyn, New York. During Adeleke's junior season he averaged 19 points and 12 rebounds. Having breakout games defeating Benjamin Cardozo and scoring 18 points and 14 rebounds. Also beating perennial powerhouse Abraham Lincoln in overtime scoring 25 points and 12 rebounds. Paul Robeson High School eventually lost to Abraham Lincoln in the PSAL playoffs quarterfinals in overtime, where he again scored 25 points and 13 rebounds. As a senior ranked the seventh-best small forward in the country by ESPN.com, accomplishments included 14 points and 14 rebounds in the Adidas ABCD Camp, which included the nations best player. Notable participants were Eddy Curry, Kwame Brown, Mo Williams, Ben Gordon. Also winning the All Star MVP award in the prestigious Five Star All Star camp with 22 points and 12 rebounds. Participants included Carmelo Anthony and Sebastian Telfair, along with Eastern Invitation camp scoring 19 points and 8 rebounds. He averaged 19 points and 13 rebounds as a senior winning the PSAL player of the year as a senior. Leading his team to a national ranking of Number #18 in USA Today. He participated in the New York vs. Chicago Windy City stars consisting of the best players from each city. He scored a record high 26 points along with 8 rebounds.

== College career ==
Adeleke committed to DePaul University, over Boston College, Providence College, New Mexico, University of Massachusetts, and Hofstra University. He later reneged on his commitment to stay closer to home and attend Hofstra.

As a freshman at Hofstra he won CAA Rookie of the year, including notable games against Syracuse scoring 20 points and 9 rebounds, against Kent State 25 points and 11 rebounds, and in the conference tournament upsetting George Mason scoring 23 points and 10 rebounds. The next game losing to scored 26 points and 8 rebounds against VCU in the semifinals loss. As a sophomore he averaged 16.1 points including 11 rebounds as was a second team all CAA selection notable games included 18 points and 9 rebounds against Gonzaga and 24 points 19 rebounds vs. Manhattan and 19 points 21 rebounds against Sweet sixteen participant UNC Wilmington. As a junior, he was a first team all CAA selection, notable games included 20 points 10 rebounds and 4 blocks against St. John's also 27 points and 15 rebounds against VCU. He later transferred to Hartford as a senior and averaged 20.7 points and 13 rebounds finishing second in the nation to Paul Millsap, as a first team America East selection, including a record setting 8 times player of the week. Notable games included 21 points and 15 rebounds against University of Virginia, and 20 points and 10 rebounds against UMass.

== Professional career ==
After going undrafted in the 2006 NBA draft, he was signed by the New York Knicks to play in the Summer League squad in Las Vegas in the Summer of 2006.

During the 2006 NBA pre-season, he played 2 games with the Seattle SuperSonics scoring 2 points from 2–2 free throws in 2 minutes against the Los Angeles Lakers before being released.

Adeleke went on to play in Israel and played for Hapoel Galil Elyon, where he played alongside the yet to be NBA veteran Omri Casspi averaging 16 points and 10 rebounds. Having a very successful season and leading the Israeli league in rebounds in 2006–07. He scored 28 points and 9 rebounds and 22 points and 12 rebounds in games against European powerhouse Jerusalem. Also scoring 19 points and 11 rebounds against Maccabi Tel Aviv, and 22 rebounds and 12 rebounds in a playoff lost in the semifinals to Maccabi Tel Aviv.

Adeleke signed again with the Seattle SuperSonics for the 2007 Summer League.

He also played in Italy for NSB Napoli and in Turkey for Hacettepe Üniversitesi.

On January 11, 2013, Adeleke was acquired by the Springfield Armor.

On January 27, 2015, he signed with Trotamundos de Carabobo of Venezuela. On May 14, 2015, he signed with Atenienses de Manatí of the Puerto Rican Baloncesto Superior Nacional.

In October 2015, he signed with Club Atlético Goes, an Uruguayan club.

The 2016–17 season, Adeleke started with Final Gençlik of the Turkish Basketball First League appearing in 19 games. Averaging 14 points and 14 rebounds, the highest rebounding average that season in European Competition. In early March 2017, he signed with Lebanese club Hekmeh BC scoring 20 points and 17 rebounds against Lebanese champion Al Riyadi Club Beirut.

In 2017, he played 11 games with Fuerza Regia of the Mexican LNBP. In January 2018, he signed with CD Español de Talca of the Liga Nacional de Básquetbol de Chile.

== Personal life ==
His name "Adeleke" means "the crown achieves happiness" in Yoruba.
