= 2010 New Zealand NBL season =

- League: New Zealand NBL
- Sport: Basketball
- Duration: 4 March – 1 July
- Number of games: 18
- Number of teams: 10

Regular season
- Minor premiers: Wellington Saints
- Season MVP: Lindsay Tait (Wellington Saints)
- Top scorer: Eric Devendorf (Wellington Saints)

Playoffs
- Champions: Wellington Saints
- Runners-up: Waikato Pistons
- Finals MVP: Lindsay Tait

New Zealand NBL seasons
- ← 2009 2011 →

The 2010 NBL season was the 29th season of the National Basketball League. Foundation member and nine-time NBL champions the Auckland Stars withdrew from the league in 2010, while the Otago Nuggets returned after a one-year absence and the Southland Sharks joined for the first time.

The regular season began on Thursday 4 March and concluded on Friday 19 June. The playoffs began on Tuesday 22 June and concluded on Thursday 1 July, with the Wellington Saints taking home their sixth NBL title after defeating the Waikato Pistons 2–1 in the best-of-three finals series. Saints' guard Lindsay Tait was recognised as the most valuable player of the regular season and of the finals series.

== Summary ==
=== Regular season standings ===
Pos
| Pos | Team | W | L |
|---|---|---|---|
| 1 | Wellington Saints | 14 | 4 |
| 2 | Waikato Pistons | 13 | 5 |
| 3 | Nelson Giants | 12 | 6 |
| 4 | Harbour Heat | 11 | 7 |
| 5 | Hawke's Bay Hawks | 11 | 7 |
| 6 | Southland Sharks | 9 | 9 |
| 7 | Christchurch Cougars | 9 | 9 |
| 8 | Taranaki Mountainairs | 6 | 12 |
| 9 | Manawatu Jets | 5 | 13 |
| 10 | Otago Nuggets | 0 | 18 |

=== Playoff bracket ===
Quarterfinals
4 | Harbour Heat | 77
5 | Hawke's Bay Hawks | 82
3 | Nelson Giants | 82
6 | Southland Sharks | 67

Semifinals
1 | Wellington Saints | 98
5 | Hawke's Bay Hawks | 92
2 | Waikato Pistons | 74
3 | Nelson Giants | 62

Finals
Wellington Saints | 74 | 98 | 82
Waikato Pistons | 80 | 69 | 79

== Awards ==
=== Player of the Week ===
| Round | Player | Team | Ref |
|---|---|---|---|
| 1 | Eric Devendorf | Wellington Saints | |
| 2 | Thomas Abercrombie | Waikato Pistons | |
| 3 | Rick Rickert | Harbour Heat | |
| 4 | Eric Devendorf | Wellington Saints | |
| 5 | Jeremy Kench | Christchurch Cougars | |
| 6 | Erron Maxey | Wellington Saints | |
| 7 | René Rougeau | Southland Sharks | |
| 8 | Thomas Abercrombie | Waikato Pistons | |
| 9 | Eric Devendorf | Wellington Saints | |
| 10 | Michael Harrison | Nelson Giants | |
| 11 | Thomas Abercrombie | Waikato Pistons | |
| 12 | René Rougeau | Southland Sharks | |
| 13 | Lindsay Tait | Wellington Saints | |
| 14 | Lindsay Tait | Wellington Saints | |
| 15 | René Rougeau | Southland Sharks | |
| 16 | René Rougeau | Southland Sharks | |

=== Statistics leaders ===
Stats as of the end of the regular season

| Category | Player | Team | Stat |
|---|---|---|---|
| Points per game | Eric Devendorf | Wellington Saints | 25.6 |
| Rebounds per game | Alex Pledger | Waikato Pistons | 12.6 |
| Assists per game | Lindsay Tait | Wellington Saints | 7.1 |
| Steals per game | René Rougeau | Southland Sharks | 3.8 |
| Blocks per game | Jon Rogers | Hawke's Bay Hawks | 2.2 |

=== Regular season ===
- Most Valuable Player: Lindsay Tait (Wellington Saints)
- NZ Most Valuable Player: Thomas Abercrombie (Waikato Pistons)
- Most Outstanding Guard: Lindsay Tait (Wellington Saints)
- Most Outstanding NZ Guard: Lindsay Tait (Wellington Saints)
- Most Outstanding Forward: Thomas Abercrombie (Waikato Pistons)
- Most Outstanding NZ Forward/Centre: Thomas Abercrombie (Waikato Pistons)
- Scoring Champion: Eric Devendorf (Wellington Saints)
- Rebounding Champion: Alex Pledger (Waikato Pistons)
- Assist Champion: Lindsay Tait (Wellington Saints)
- Rookie of the Year: Martin Iti (Southland Sharks)
- Coach of the Year: Pero Cameron (Wellington Saints)
- All-Star Five:
  - G: Lindsay Tait (Wellington Saints)
  - G: Eric Devendorf (Wellington Saints)
  - F: René Rougeau (Southland Sharks)
  - F: Thomas Abercrombie (Waikato Pistons)
  - C: Mika Vukona (Nelson Giants)

=== Playoffs ===
- Finals MVP: Lindsay Tait (Wellington Saints)
