= Aaron Toomey =

American basketball player and coach (born 1992)

Hartford Hawks
- Title: Head coach
- Conference: Commonwealth Coast Conference

Personal information
- Born: May 1, 1992 (age 34) Greensboro, North Carolina, U.S.
- Listed height: 6 ft 1 in (1.85 m)
- Listed weight: 170 lb (77 kg)

Career information
- High school: Bishop McGuinness (Kernersville, North Carolina)
- College: Amherst (2010–2014)
- NBA draft: 2014: undrafted
- Position: Point guard
- Number: 2
- Coaching career: 2015–present

Career history

Playing
- 2014: Fuenlabrada

Coaching
- 2015–2019: Amherst (assistant)
- 2019–2020: Amherst (interim)
- 2020–2021: Vassar (assistant)
- 2021–2023: Rochester (assistant)
- 2023–present: Hartford

Career highlights
- As player: NCAA Division III champion (2013); NABC Division III Player of the Year (2013); 2× First-team Division III All-American – NABC (2013, 2014); 2× NESCAC Player of the Year (2013, 2014); 3× First-team All-NESCAC (2012–2014); NESCAC Rookie of the Year (2011)

Aaron Toomey (born May 1, 1992) is an American college basketball coach for the Hartford Hawks of the Commonwealth Coast Conference. He played college basketball for the Amherst Mammoths, where he was the national Player of the Year in 2013 and led the Mammoths to the Division III national championship.

A Greensboro, North Carolina native, Toomey attended Bishop McGuinness Catholic High School. He committed to play for coach David Hixon at Amherst College. At Amherst, Toomey led the Mammoths to one of the most successful stretches in their history. As a junior point guard in the 2012–13 season, Toomey averaged 17.3 points, 5 assists and 4.8 rebounds per game, leading the program to its second national championship. For the season, Toomey was named the national player of the year by the National Association of Basketball Coaches (NABC).

Following the close of his college career, Toomey signed with Fuenlabrada in Spain. His career was cut short prematurely due to injury and he returned to Amherst as an assistant on Hixon's staff. He served in this role until 2019 when Hixon took a leave of absence from the program and Toomey was named the interim head coach.

After stints as an assistant at Vassar and Rochester, Toomey was named the head coach for the Hartford Hawks in 2023.
