= Dan Leibovitz =

American basketball player and coach (born 1973)

Biographical details
- Born: July 30, 1973 (age 53); Philadelphia, Pennsylvania, U.S.

Playing career
- 1992–1993: Franklin & Marshall
- 1993–1996: Penn

Coaching career (HC unless noted)
- 1996–2006: Temple (assistant)
- 2006–2010: Hartford
- 2010–2012: Penn (assistant)
- 2012–2013: Charlotte Bobcats (assistant)

Head coaching record
- Overall: 46–82 (.358) (college)

Dan Leibovitz (born July 30, 1973) is an American former basketball coach. He was an assistant coach for the Charlotte Bobcats of the NBA for the 2012–13 season, and previously a college head coach at Hartford from 2006 to 2010, and an assistant coach at Temple (1996–2006) and Penn (2010–2012). Leibovitz worked as the Associate Commissioner for men's basketball for the Southeastern Conference (2016–2023). He is currently the Senior Associate Commissioner for Men's Basketball for the Big East. On March 18, 2026 Leibovitz was announced as commissioner of the A10.

== Coaching career ==
=== Temple ===
Leibovitz served as an assistant under Hall of Fame coach John Chaney for 10 seasons. On March 14, 2006, Leibovitz served as acting head coach for Temple's NIT playoff game, which they lost in overtime to Akron after star player Mardy Collins, a projected NBA first-round pick, was seriously injured.

In 2005, Leibovitz was also acting coach during the final three regular season contests and the Owls' two Atlantic 10 Tournament games as Chaney served a self-imposed then University sanctioned suspension. The Owls went 3–2 to secure an NIT bid.

Leibovitz's 10-year tenure as assistant coach was tied for the longest tenure in all of Temple's Atlantic 10 conference. During his time with the Owls, the team made ten straight postseason appearances. He began his coaching career in 1994 at Episcopal Academy in Merion, Pa.

=== Hartford ===
In 2006, Leibovitz was named the head coach at Hartford. After a 13–18 season in his first year at the helm, he led the Hawks to an 18–16 record and tie for second place in the America East Conference. During this season Hartford made it to the America East Championship game falling to UMBC 82–65. It was the highest win total in school history since joining Division I in 1984. After the 2008 season Leibovitz signed a contract extension. In 2010, Leibovitz resigned his position at Hartford to take a position as an assistant coach at Penn. His record in four seasons with the Hawks was 46–82.

=== Charlotte Bobcats ===
After a two-year stint on the Quakers staff, Leibovitz joined Mike Dunlap's staff of the NBA's Charlotte Bobcats, reunited with his one-time Hartford assistant, Rick Brunson.

== Early career ==
Leibovitz has a Master's in Sport Management and Leisure Studies at Temple (1998) and a Bachelor's from University of Pennsylvania (1996), having transferred to Penn from Franklin & Marshall College after his freshman year. Leibovitz played basketball at both schools as well as at Episcopal Academy in his home town of Bryn Mawr, Pennsylvania.

== Head coaching record ==
Record table
Season	Team	Overall	Conference	Standing	Postseason
Hartford Hawks (America East Conference) (2006–2010)
2006–07	Hartford	13–18	6–10		
2007–08	Hartford	18–16	10–6		
2008–09	Hartford	7–26	2–14		
2009–10	Hartford	8–22	6–10		
Hartford:		46–82	24–40		
Total:		46–82			
National champion Postseason invitational champion Conference regular season champion Conference regular season and conference tournament champion Division regular season champion Division regular season and conference tournament champion Conference tournament champion

== Sources ==
- "Longtime Temple coach Chaney retires", ESPN.com, March 13, 2006
- "Dan Leibovitz, Head Coach", University of Hartford website
- "Temple Coach Chaney Announcing Retirement Today", The Washington Post, March 13, 2006
- "Chaney's career over as Temple falls in NIT first round", ESPN.com, March 15, 2006
