= Eric Devendorf =

American basketball player

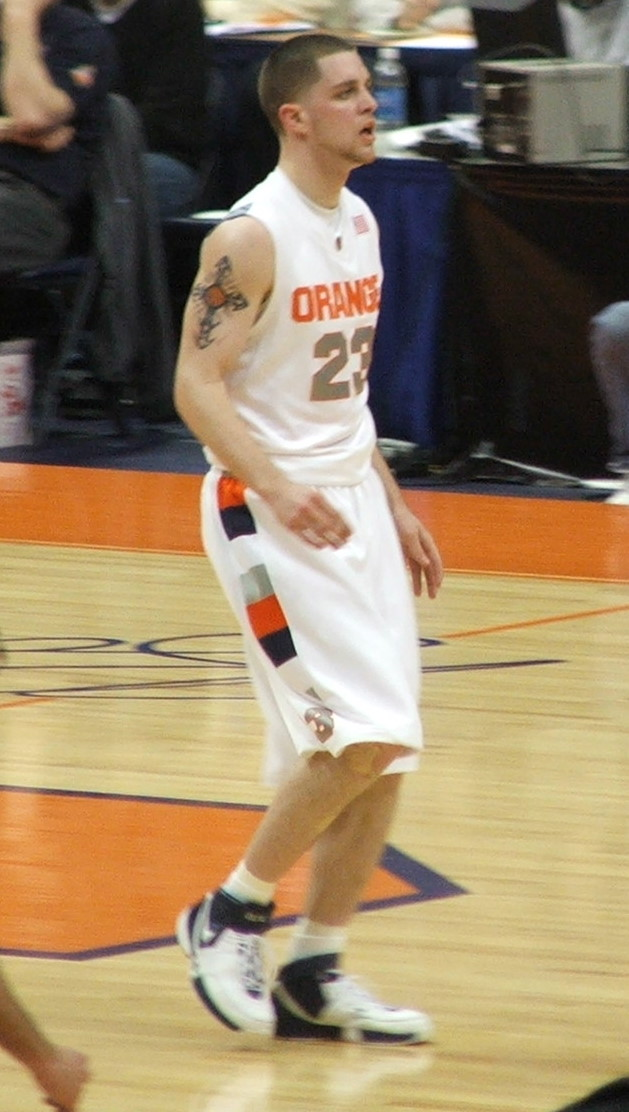
- Devendorf with Syracuse in 2007

Personal information
- Born: April 21, 1987 (age 39) Bay City, Michigan
- Listed height: 6 ft 4 in (1.93 m)
- Listed weight: 180 lb (82 kg)

Career information
- High school: Bay City Central Highschool
- College: Syracuse (2005–2009)
- NBA draft: 2009: undrafted
- Playing career: 2009–2016
- Position: Shooting guard / point guard

Career history

Playing
- 2009–2010: Reno Bighorns
- 2010: Waikato Pistons
- 2010: Wellington Saints
- 2010–2011: Melbourne Tigers
- 2011: Selçuk Üniversitesi
- 2011–2012: Idaho Stampede
- 2012: Reno Bighorns
- 2012–2013: Dnipro-Azot
- 2013: Hapoel Afula
- 2014: Ilysiakos
- 2014: Super City Rangers
- 2016: Super City Rangers

Coaching
- 2016–2018: Syracuse (asst. strength coach)
- 2018–2019: Detroit Mercy (special asst.)
- 2021–2022: Liverpool HS (girls' J.V. HC)

Career highlights
- NZNBL champion (2010); 2× NZNBL scoring champion (2010, 2016); Big East All-Rookie Team (2006); Third-team Parade All-American (2005); McDonald's All-American (2005)

Eric Michael Devendorf (born April 21, 1987) is an American former professional basketball player. Devendorf played at Syracuse from 2005 to 2009. He averaged 15.7 points per game in his final season at Syracuse. He ranks 14th on the school's all-time scoring list with 1,680 points. Despite having one more year of eligibility remaining, Devendorf decided to leave Syracuse and embark on a pro career. He spent the next seven years playing professionally in the NBA D-League and in foreign countries such as Ukraine, Israel, Greece and New Zealand. In October 2016, he returned to Syracuse after being appointed to head coach Jim Boeheim's staff as assistant strength coach.

== College career ==
=== 2005–06 ===
Devendorf was named to the Big East All-Rookie team his freshman year after averaging 12.1 points and 2.3 assists per game. Devendorf joined the starting lineup six games into the season, and hit a key layup against Georgetown in the Big East tournament to send Syracuse to the Big East Championship.

=== 2006–07 ===
Devendorf was named MVP of the BCA Invitational after averaging 16.0 points a game during the three contests. During the regular season, Devendorf had strong showings against Marquette (20 points), St. Johns (23), DePaul (27) and Villanova (33). The sophomore saved his best showing for the postseason, scoring a career high 34 points against South Alabama in the National Invitation Tournament. Devendorf finished the season averaging 14.8 points and 4.1 assists as a sophomore and was an Honorable Mention All-Big East selection.

=== 2007–08 ===
Devendorf was leading Syracuse in scoring 10 games into his junior season averaging 17.0 points and 3.9 assists per game. However, he would be sidelined the rest of the season after tearing his ACL against East Tennessee State. Devendorf was granted a hardship waiver during the 2007–08 season after missing 25 games, which meant that for the 2008–09 season, although classified as a senior academically, he would remain a junior in athletic eligibility.

=== 2008–09 ===
Devendorf returned to the Syracuse lineup with a 14-point effort against Le Moyne and 22 points against Oakland. However, on December 11, 2008, Devendorf was suspended indefinitely, pending appeal, from Syracuse University. The suspension was the result of a university judicial board hearing stemming from an incident involving Devendorf and a female student. Devendorf was accused of striking the female student in the face during an altercation in the early morning hours of November 1. The board found that Devendorf had violated three out of the five student codes he was accused of. Furthermore, Devendorf was already on disciplinary probation as the result of harming a student during the spring 2008 semester. The university judicial board recommended he be suspended for the remainder of the academic year, which his coach Jim Boeheim thought was too severe. Devendorf, as expected, appealed.

The Appeals board rendered its decision effective on December 19, 2008, upon which Devendorf was suspended. Upon his completion of 40 hours of community service, he would be allowed to rejoin the university and the basketball team. After completing his 40 hours of community service, Devendorf was reinstated by the University on December 27.

In April 2009, Devendorf declared himself eligible for the NBA draft with one year of NCAA eligibility remaining, foregoing his senior season.

== Professional career ==
=== 2009–10 season ===
Devendorf went undrafted in the 2009 NBA draft. On December 26, 2009, he was acquired by the Reno Bighorns of the NBA D-League. He made his debut the same day, scoring just 2 points in 14 minutes of action, as the Bighorns defeated the Tulsa 66ers 102–87. On January 4, 2010, he was waived by the Bighorns.

On February 9, 2010, Devendorf signed with the Waikato Pistons for the 2010 New Zealand NBL season. He scored 49 points in the season opener.

On April 12, 2010, Devendorf was released by the Pistons following a bar conflict involving Hawks' imports Josh Pace and Jamil Terrell. The next day, he signed with the Wellington Saints for the rest of the season. The Saints went on to win the 2010 championship.

=== 2010–11 season ===
In May 2010, Devendorf signed with the Melbourne Tigers for the 2010–11 NBL season. On February 2, 2011, Devendorf was released by the Tigers. In 18 games for the Tigers, he averaged 14.6 points, 2.7 rebounds and 1.8 assists per game.

Later that month, he signed with Torku Selcuk Universitesi of Turkey for the rest of the season. He scored 22 points in his first game.

=== 2011–12 season ===
On November 3, 2011, Devendorf was selected by the Idaho Stampede in the 4th round of the 2011 NBA D-League draft. On January 5, 2012, he was waived by the Stampede. On January 20, 2012, he was re-acquired by the Stampede. Four days later, he was traded to the Reno Bighorns.

=== 2012–13 season ===
In August 2012, Devendorf signed with Dnipro-Azot of Ukraine for the 2012–13 season.

=== 2013–14 season ===
In August 2013, Devendorf signed with Hapoel Afula of Israel for the 2013–14 season. In November 2013, he left Hapoel after just 6 games.

On February 24, 2014, he signed with Ilysiakos of Greece for the rest of the season. He left after just 2 games.

On March 12, 2014, he signed with the Super City Rangers for the 2014 New Zealand NBL season. He left the team in late April due a back injury. In five games for the Rangers, he averaged 20.2 points, 2.4 rebounds, 4.4 assists and 1.6 steals per game.

=== 2014–15 season ===
In August 2014, Devendorf signed with Proger BLS Chieti of the Serie A2 Silver Basket. However, his contract was later voided by the club after he failed medical tests.

In January 2015, Devendorf signed with Gaiteros del Zulia of the Venezuelan League, but was released the following month before appearing in any games for them.

=== 2015–16 season ===
On August 24, 2015, Devendorf joined the Wellington Saints Invitational team for a three-day mini camp before travelling to Taiwan to play in the 2015 William Jones Cup. In the Saints' first game of the tournament against Chinese Taipei B on August 29, Devendorf recorded 21 points and 5 rebounds in a 102–85 win.

On February 16, 2016, Devendorf signed with the Super City Rangers for the 2016 New Zealand NBL season, returning to the club for a second stint.

== Post-playing career ==
In October 2016, Devendorf was named the assistant strength coach for Syracuse's men's basketball team, returning to his college program that he left in 2009 and effectively ending his seven-year professional playing career. In September 2018, Devendorf accepted a job at the University of Detroit Mercy to work on the staff of the school's first-year coach Mike Davis, joining as a special assistant to the head coach.

== Personal ==
Devendorf is the son of Curt and Cindy Devendorf, and has two sisters, Jill and Anna.
