= Jack Phelan (basketball, born 1954) =

American basketball coach (1954–2020)

Biographical details
- Born: June 14, 1954; Hartford, Connecticut, U.S.
- Died: July 20, 2020 (aged 66); West Hartford, Connecticut, U.S.

Playing career
- 1974–1977: Saint Francis (PA)

Coaching career (HC unless noted)
- 1977–1978: Niagara (assistant)
- 1978–1979: Saint Francis (PA) (assistant)
- 1979–1981: Fairfield (assistant)
- 1981–1992: Hartford

Head coaching record
- Overall: 128–181

John Phelan (June 14, 1954 – July 20, 2020) was an American college basketball coach. He served as the University of Hartford's men's head coach from 1981 to 1992 and compiled an overall record of 128–181. Phelan oversaw the transition of the program from an NCAA Division II program into Division I. His previous coaching stops included Niagara University, Saint Francis University, and Fairfield University.

As a player, Phelan suited up for the Saint Francis Red Flash after a high school career at Northwest Catholic High School in West Hartford, Connecticut. He scored a Stokes Fieldhouse record 42 points in his senior season against Duquesne. Phelan was chosen in the sixth round of the 1977 NBA draft by the Golden State Warriors, although he never played in the league.

After stepping down as Hartford's head coach in 1992, Phelan went into private consulting. He eventually became a high school athletics administrator at Farmington High School in Connecticut.
