= David Hixon =

American basketball coach

David Hixon (born December 3, 1952) is a retired American college basketball head coach who spent 42 years coaching Amherst College. As head coach, he transformed the Amherst men's basketball program into one of the best in the nation.

He was inducted into the New England Basketball Hall of Fame in 2003 and into the Naismith Memorial Basketball Hall of Fame in 2023.

== Playing career ==
The Andover, Massachusetts native was a member of the Amherst College men's basketball team while studying psychology. He graduated in 1975.

His father, Wil Hixon, was a basketball coach at the high school level, best known for his stint at Andover High School where he also coached his son. Father and son won a state championship in 1970. Both were inducted into the New England Basketball Hall of Fame in 2003.

== Coaching career ==
Following his playing days, Hixon earned a master's degree from the University of Massachusetts and volunteered in coaching (basketball, track & field, football) at Amherst.

Hixon was hired as Amherst head coach in 1977 at only 24 years of age. Until his retirement, he compiled a coaching record of 826–293, ranking him 15th in NCAA men's basketball when he retired in April 2020. He had a winning percentage of .738, good for a 10th place in NCAA Division III history, at the time of his retirement. He was named NABC NCAA Division III Coach of the Year in 2007 and 2013.

Hixon's Amherst teams won national championships in 2006–07 and 2012–13. In 2008, he reached the national championship game with his squad, where they suffered defeat to Washington (MO). In 2004, 2006, 2014, 2016, he led Amherst to the national semifinals.

Under his tutelage, Amherst participated in the NCAA national tournament 20 times and compiled a 43-20 postseason record. However, due to New England Small Conference Athletic Conference (NESCAC) rules, his Amherst team was ineligible for NCAA postseason play until 1994. He took on arch rival Williams College 21 times during his coaching career, winning 17.

Hixon also coached soccer and track at Amherst. On May 7, 2022, the floor at Amherst's LeFrak Gymnasium was named Hixon Court.

=== Retirement ===
On September 16, 2019, it was announced that Hixon would be taking a leave of absence for the 2019–2020 season, and that assistant coach Aaron Toomey would be the interim head coach. On April 13, 2020, Hixon announced his retirement. In April 2023, it was published that he was elected into the Naismith Memorial Basketball Hall of Fame. Hixon was the first coach of an NCAA Division III institution to be inducted.

=== Legacy ===
Several of Hixon's players went on to play professionally, including players like:

- Andrew Olson (played in Germany; All-American in 2007 and 2008)
- Willy Workman (plays in Israel; All-American in 2013)
- Kevin Hopkins (played in Germany)
- Fletcher Walters (played in Germany and Luxemburg)
- Pat Fitzsimmons (played in Germany and Ireland)
- Brian Baskauskas (played in Denmark; All-American in 2009)

Other standout players of his Amherst tenure include

- Aaron Toomey (2014 D3hoops.com NCAA Division III Player of the Year, also All-American in 2012 and 2013)
- John Bedford (2006 All-American)
- Andrew Schiel (2005 All-American)
- Steve Zieja (2003 All-American)
- Jamal Wilson (1997 All-American)
- Conor Meehan (2011 All-American)
- Jordan Moss (2011 All-American)

Throughout his coaching career, Hixon received interest from NCAA Division I schools, especially from the Ivy League. In 2008, he was a candidate to become the new head coach of Bucknell University. Hixon declined the offer, but suggested Dave Paulsen of Amherst's rival Williams College as a candidate. Paulsen eventually ended up getting the Bucknell job.

== Family ==
His wife Mandy, a member of the United States International Diving Team from 1980 to 1984, served as diving coach at Amherst College, Williams College and the University of Massachusetts Amherst. She was also an assistant Professor of Physical Education, Coordinator of Aquatics, assistant Director of Intramurals and assistant coach of field hockey, lacrosse and tennis.

The couple's first son Matthew is a film editor, their younger son Michael won silver medals at the 2016 and 2020 Olympic Games in diving.

== See also ==
- List of college men's basketball coaches with 600 wins
