= Joe Zeglinski =

American basketball player (born 1987)

Personal information
- Born: February 18, 1987 (age 39)
- Listed height: 6 ft 0 in (1.83 m)
- Listed weight: 185 lb (84 kg)

Career information
- High school: Archbishop Ryan (Philadelphia, Pennsylvania)
- College: Hartford (2006–2011)
- NBA draft: 2011: undrafted
- Position: Shooting guard

Career history
- 2011: Horsens IC

Career highlights
- First-team All-America East (2008); 2× Second-team All-AEC (2010, 2011); AEC All-Rookie Team (2007)

Joseph Zeglinski (born February 18, 1987) is an American former professional basketball player who played for Horsens IC of the Danish Basketball League from June 2011 to December 2011. He was known to be a prominent three-point shooter in his college basketball years with Hartford, recording the 15th most three-pointers in NCAA Division I men's basketball history as of the end of the 2013–14 season. He scored 2,016 points in his Hartford career.

His brother Sammy Zeglinski plays professional basketball.

He is the current head basketball coach and athletic director at his alma mater Archbishop Ryan, where his number 24 (basketball) and number 20 (football) have been retired by the school.
