= Puke Lenden =

New Zealand basketball player and coach

Personal information
- Born: 4 January 1980 (age 46)
- Listed height: 195 cm (6 ft 5 in)

Career information
- High school: Napier Boys' (Napier, New Zealand)
- Playing career: 1998–2015
- Position: Shooting guard / small forward

Career history

Playing
- 1998: Hawke's Bay Hawks
- 1999: Auckland Rebels
- 2000–2002: Hawke's Bay Hawks
- 2003–2011: Waikato Titans/Pistons
- 2014: Southland Sharks
- 2015: Super City Rangers

Coaching
- 2013: Waikato Wizards

Career highlights
- 3× NBL champion (1999, 2008, 2009); NBL Finals MVP (2008); FOPC All-Star Five (2013)

Puke Lenden (born 4 January 1980) is a New Zealand former professional basketball player who played in the National Basketball League (NBL). He attended Napier Boys' High School in Napier, New Zealand.

After debuting in the NBL in 1998 with the Hawke's Bay Hawks, Lenden joined the Auckland Rebels in 1999 and won his first championship. He returned to the Hawks in 2000 and played there until the end of the 2002 season. Lenden moved to Waikato in 2003 and played for the Titans/Pistons until the end of the 2011 season. He won championships with the Pistons in 2008 and 2009, and was named Finals MVP in 2008. Following Waikato's withdrawal from the league in 2012, Lenden retired from the NBL.

In 2013, Lenden coached the Waikato Wizards women's side and played for the NZ Maori team that won gold at the FIBA Oceania Pacific Championship.

Lenden came out of retirement in June 2014 to help the Southland Sharks, after the team lost four players to suspension. He continued on in the NBL in 2015, playing his final season with the Super City Rangers.
