= Christchurch Cougars =

- League: National Basketball League
- Founded: December 2008
- Folded: March 2011
- History: Christchurch Cougars; 2009–2010
- Arena: Cowles Stadium
- Location: Christchurch, Canterbury, New Zealand
- Team colours: Black, white, red, grey
- Ownership: Amy and Andrew Gardiner
- Championships: 0

The Christchurch Cougars were a New Zealand basketball team based in Christchurch. The Cougars competed in the National Basketball League (NBL) and played their home games at Cowles Stadium. The Cougars played two seasons in the NBL before folding following the 2011 Christchurch earthquake.

== Team history ==
In December 2008, in the wake of the Canterbury Rams withdrawing from the NBL, the Christchurch Cougars were established by Christchurch basketball couple Amy and Andrew Gardiner. The Cougars debuted in the NBL in the 2009 season with Andrew Gardiner as head coach. They reached the semi-finals in 2009 and missed the playoffs in the 2010 season.

Following the 2010 season, the Cougars ran into financial issues. In January 2011, the team was kicked out of Cowles Stadium due to unpaid debt to the city council. The Gardiners intended to move their team to a new stadium just being finished in Lincoln on the outskirts of the city. However, following the Christchurch earthquake, the Cougars were forced to withdraw from the NBL in March 2011. A rescue package to save the Cougars was attempted, but ultimately the level of financial risk was too great.

In April 2013, the Cougars were rumoured to be ready to re-enter the NBL within two years. This did not eventuate, and in November 2013, the Canterbury Rams were granted re-entry into the league.
