= Mychal Green =

American basketball player (born 1983)

Mychal Green (born January 15, 1983, in Columbus, Ohio, United States ) is an American professional basketball player. He is a 6'4" guard and plays for the Glasgow Rocks.

Green played his first two years of collegiate basketball for the Ohlone College Renegades in California. In 2004–05, he then transferred to Ohio University in Athens, Ohio. As a junior at Ohio, he led the team in scoring, averaging 15.0 points a game, 11th best in the Mid-American Conference. In a first-round NCAA tournament game in Nashville, Tennessee, Green scored 24 points against the Florida Gators.

In his senior year, he again led the Bobcats with 12.7 points a game, good enough to be voted to the 2006 MAC All-tournament team. His career high at Ohio University was 25 points which he hit on three occasions. In addition to this Green was a co-captain in his senior year for the Bobcats.

Green led the Canterbury Rams in scoring during the 2007 NBL season with 20.3 ppg.
