= Archbishop Ryan High School =

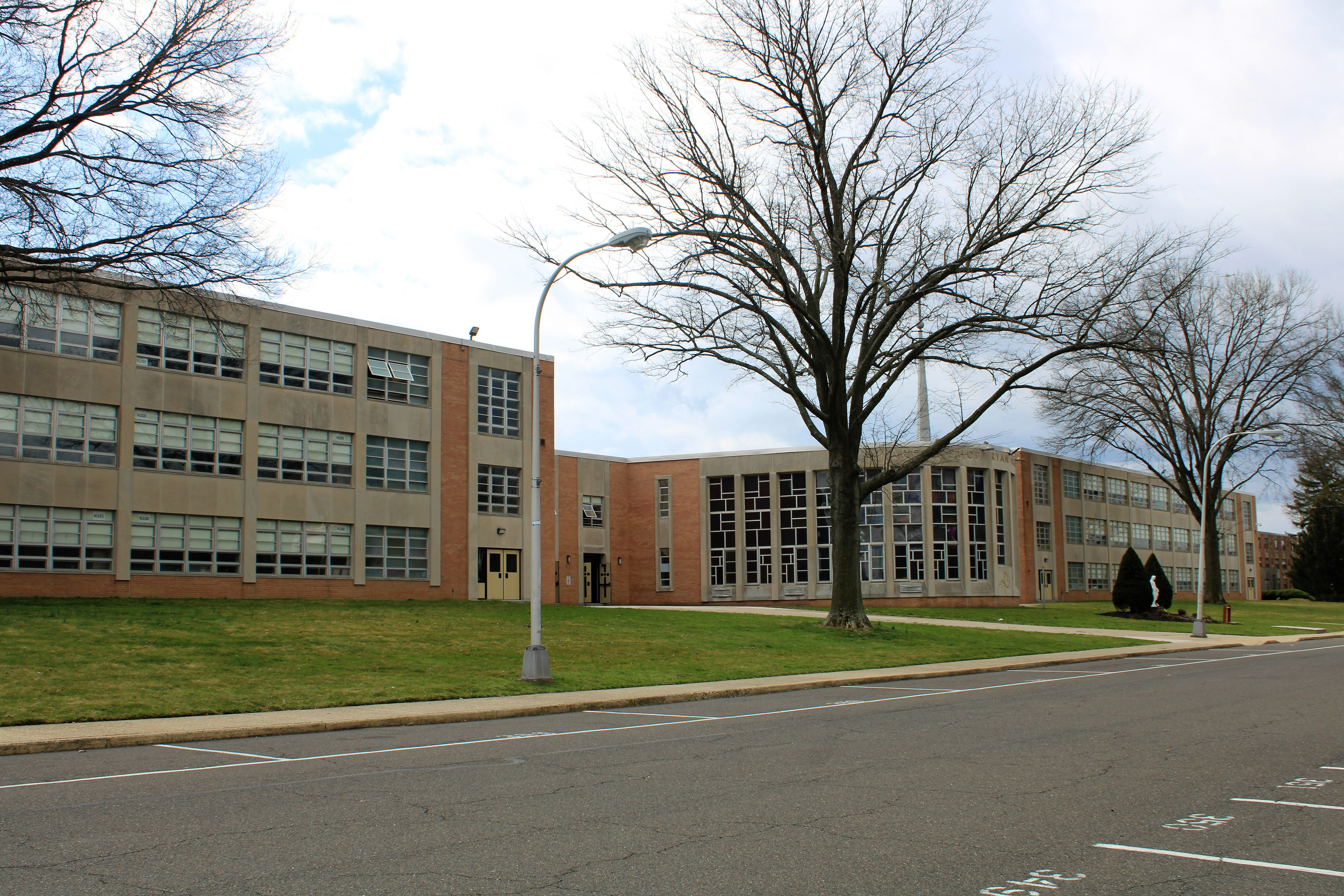

Location
- 11201 Academy Road; Philadelphia, Pennsylvania 19154; United States; 40°5′6″N 74°59′11″W

Information
- Type: Private, Coeducational
- Motto: In Vite Mane
- Religious affiliation: Roman Catholic
- Patron saints: Blessed Virgin Mary and St. Francis of Assisi
- Established: 1966
- Oversight: Archdiocese of Philadelphia
- Superintendent: Nancy Kurtz
- School code: 39–502
- CEEB code: 393–244
- President: Joseph Sanginiti
- Principal: Joseph McFadden
- Grades: 9–12
- Student to teacher ratio: 21:1
- Campus: Urban
- Campus size: 35 acres (140,000 m^{2})
- Colors: Black, Red, Gold
- Slogan: In Vite Mane. (Remain on the vine)
- Mascot: Raider (Men), Ragdoll (Women)
- Team name: Raiders
- Rival: Father Judge High School
- Accreditation: Middle States Association of Colleges and Schools
- Publication: The Vine (literary magazine)
- Newspaper: AR Edition
- Yearbook: The Sentinel
- Tuition: $10,500
- Alumni: 35,000 +
- Admissions Director: Erin Robinson
- Athletic Director: Joe Zeglinski
- Website: www.archbishopryan.com

Archbishop Ryan High School is a Roman Catholic high school located in Philadelphia, Pennsylvania. Its namesake is Patrick John Ryan, who served as the second Archbishop of Philadelphia from 1884 to 1911.

Established in 1966, Archbishop Ryan High School is the largest Catholic secondary school in the city of Philadelphia, with a current enrollment of 848 students as of the 2023–2024 school year. Its students come from over 60 Catholic, public, and charter elementary schools located throughout Philadelphia, Bucks, and Montgomery Counties.

== History ==
=== 20th century ===
Archbishop Ryan High School first opened in 1966 as Archbishop Ryan High School for Boys and Archbishop Ryan High School for Girls; two separate single-sex high schools with their own administrations and faculties that each occupied one half of a single shared school building. Founded under the jurisdiction of the Roman Catholic Archdiocese of Philadelphia, Archbishop Ryan was the twenty-eighth Archdiocesan high school to be established. Beginning with the 1988-1989 school year, the two schools merged to form a single co-ed Catholic secondary school; the merger was completed by the fall of 1989 and the first combined class graduated in June 1990.

Archbishop Ryan was the 28th Archdiocesan high school to be founded and the sixth begun by Cardinal John Krol, who continued the tradition of furthering Catholic education in the Philadelphia archdiocese. The 35-acre (140,000 m^{2}) tract on Academy Road accommodates a spacious school building, and outdoor athletic fields as well as parking areas. The original design by architects, Dagit Associates, eased the merger. The central shared facilities of an auditorium, library media center, and chapel serve the coeducational student body. Ryan's students come from the Philadelphia area as well as the surrounding suburban areas.

=== 21st century ===
In the summer of 2014, Archbishop Ryan hired the current president, Denise LePera, as the previous president, Michael McArdle, was appointed to the office of Director of Financial Aid in the Office of Catholic Education within the Archdiocese of Philadelphia. In June 2017, Denise LePera stepped down as President of Archbishop Ryan. In November 2017, Michael Barnett '90 was appointed the newest President of Archbishop Ryan. He resigned in May 2021. On June 16, 2022, the Archdiocese of Philadelphia's Office of Catholic Education announced that Joseph Sanginiti '75 would succeed Barnett as the current president of Archbishop Ryan.

== Notable alumni ==
- Izaiah Brockington, class of 2017, professional basketball player
- Steve Farrell, class of 1978, former bassist in Philadelphia hardcore punk band Kid Dynamite
- Christopher Ferguson, class of 1979, pilot of Atlantis Space Shuttle for NASA, September 2006
- Tom Filer, class of 1974, Major League Baseball pitcher from 1982 to 1992 for Chicago Cubs, Toronto Blue Jays, Milwaukee Brewers, and New York Mets; pitching coach of Altoona Curve, Double-A affiliate of Pittsburgh Pirates
- Matt Knowles, class of 1988, professional soccer player from 1990 to 2003
- Jonathan Loughran, actor, personal assistant to Adam Sandler
- Chris McKendry, class of 1986, ESPN Sportscenter anchor
- Chris Mooney, class of 1990, head coach of University of Richmond Spiders men's basketball team
- Patrick Murphy, class of 1991, member of United States House of Representatives from Pennsylvania's 8th Congressional District, first Iraq War veteran in Congress
- Dennis M. O'Brien, class of 1970, 137th speaker of Pennsylvania House of Representatives, representing Pennsylvania's 169th Legislative District in Northeast Philadelphia since 1979
- Christina Perri, class of 2004, singer known for her song Jar of Hearts, A Thousand Years, and Human
- Jimmy Shubert, stand-up comedian
- Thomas Sorber, class of 2024, professional basketball player
- Ray Staszak, class of 1980, first Pennsylvanian to play in National Hockey League after Pete Babando, who decades earlier scored game-winning goal in overtime in Game 7 of the 1950 Stanley Cup Finals
- Frank Wycheck, class of 1989, NFL tight end, color commentator on Tennessee Titans radio network; one of only five tight ends to surpass 500 receptions in NFL history
- Joe Zeglinski, class of 2006, professional basketball player

== Academics ==
Archbishop Ryan offers a variety of studies covering various subject areas including English, Social Studies, Mathematics, Natural and Physical Sciences, World Languages (Spanish and Latin), Business, Technology, Theology, Music, and Fine Arts. Coursework is required in the fields of English, Social Studies, Mathematics, Natural and Physical Science Studies, Theology and World Languages.

Archbishop Ryan has a student/teacher ratio of 21:1. Ryan offers both courses in writing skills and digital literacy, and has 11 AP classes. Ryan offers a 4-year art program, including AP art and a 4-year music instrumental program. Ryan also offers a music tech course. Holy Family University offers college level courses at the Ryan campus for seniors during the regular school day.

Archbishop Ryan hosts the archdiocesan program for students with diagnosed learning needs, the Bonaventure Program. The Bonaventure Program is for applicants with an IEP.

The Class of 2023 received over $42 million in scholarships and financial aid for post-graduate study. Approximately 94% of Ryan's graduates go on to higher education.

== Athletics ==
The competitive boys' sports of Archbishop Ryan include baseball, basketball, football, wrestling, bowling, cross country, ice hockey, golf, indoor/outdoor track and field, lacrosse, soccer, swimming, and tennis. The competitive girls' sports of Archbishop Ryan include basketball, bowling, cross country, field hockey, indoor/outdoor track and field, lacrosse, ragdoll cheerleading, raider cheerleading, soccer, softball, tennis, volleyball, and swimming.

== Extracurricular activities ==
Almost 94% of the student body at Archbishop Ryan participates in after school activities and sports. The school has over 74 clubs with everything from Strategy Games club to a Sewing club.

Archbishop Ryan has a theater program that produces two musical productions per year. It also hosts a summer program that produces a summer musical. Their auditorium's sound booth provides Izod Surround Sound 55:1 settings.

The Ryan Review, Archbishop Ryan's award-winning newspaper, has received recognition year-after-year for journalistic excellence. All of the Review's editors are members of the Quill & Scroll International Honor Society for High School Journalism and the staff writers study closely with the editors. The staff uses Associated Press Formatting and InDesign to produce their paper. The Ryan Review does most of its own photography through the Photo Editor and two photographers through the use of a Nikon D40 camera with a 14-155mm lens. This paper also features a texting service to allow student interaction with the editors.

The Yearbook provides a way for students to participate in creating a yearbook which will be handed out to each graduating class as part of their prom fee. Students use InDesign, Photoshop, and Paint to do layout work for the yearbook and take most of their own pictures, using digital cameras and a single Nikon D300.

Other clubs and activities include:

- Ambassadors
- American Math Competition
- Asian Student Association
- Anime Club
- American Sign Language Club
- Art Club
- Book Club
- Chorus
- Community Service Corps
- Concert Band
- Creative Writing Club
- Fishing Club
- Jazz Band
- Pit Orchestra
- Pep Band
- Future Business Leaders of America (FBLA)
- Future Engineers
- Garden Club
- Health Careers Club
- Interact Club
- Mathletes (JV and Varsity)
- National Honor Society (Rho Kappa, National English Honor Society, Nuestro Capitulo)
- No Place for Hate
- Orchestra
- Ryan for Life
- Ryan Pride
- Speech and Debate Team
- Stage Crew
- Student Council
- Table Tennis
- Protect our Schools
- Tribe-a-Thon Planning Team
- TV Studio/Media Club
- Renaissance Club
- AR Minds Matter
