= Jaret von Rosenberg =

American basketball player and coach (born 1987)

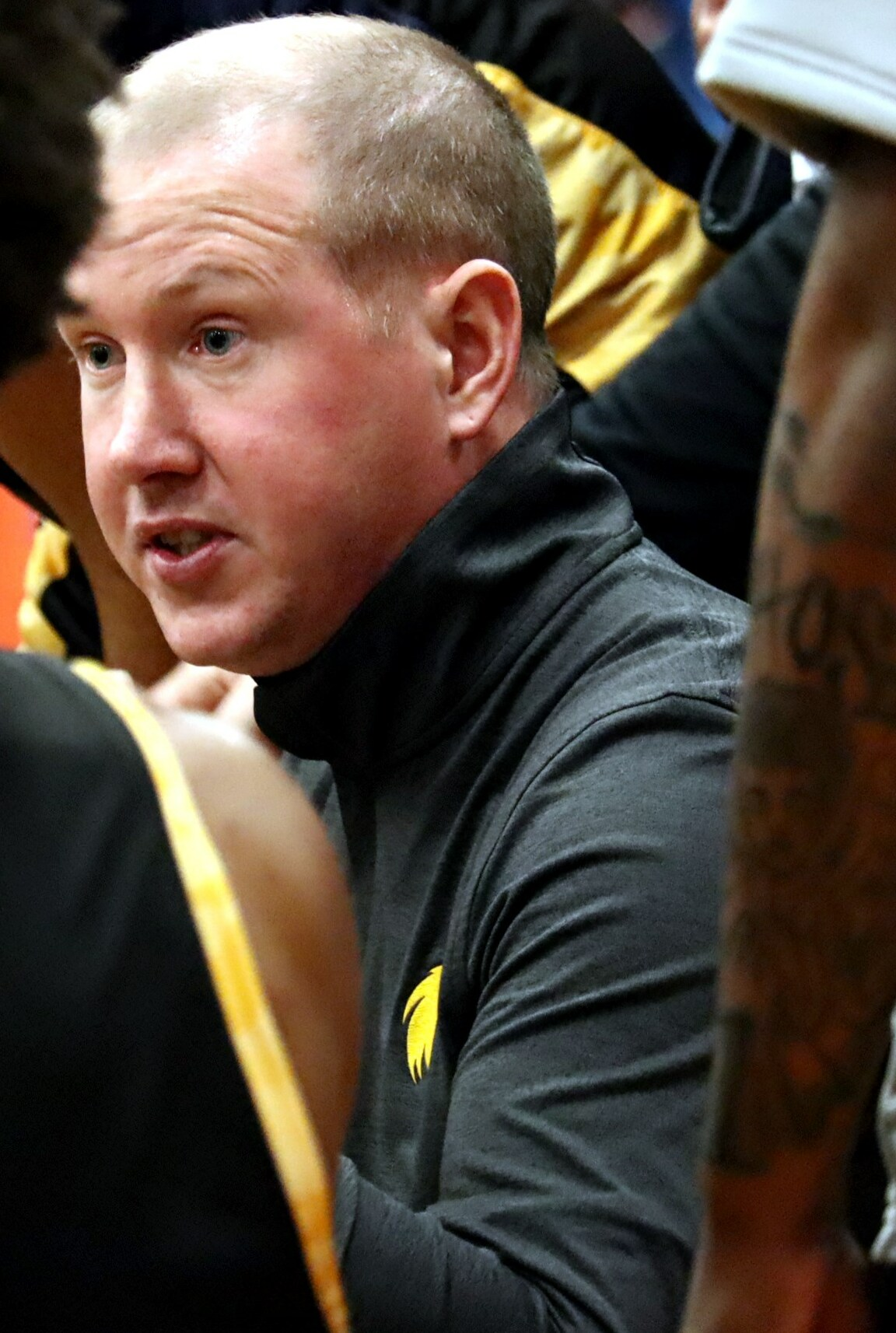
- von Rosenberg with Texas A&M–Commerce in 2023

Current position
- Title: Head coach
- Team: East Texas A&M
- Conference: Southland
- Record: 130–133 (.494)

Biographical details
- Born: April 12, 1987 (age 39); Mission, Texas, U.S.

Playing career
- 2005–2006: Collin County
- 2006–2009: Hartford
- Position: Guard

Coaching career (HC unless noted)
- 2009–2011: Collin (assistant)
- 2011–2013: Abilene Christian (assistant)
- 2013–2015: Texas A&M–Commerce (assistant)
- 2015–2017: Hartford (assistant)
- 2017–present: Texas A&M–Commerce / East Texas A&M

Head coaching record
- Overall: 130–133 (.494)
- Tournaments: 2–3 (NCAA Division II)

Jaret von Rosenberg (born April 12, 1987) is an American college basketball coach and former player. He is currently the head coach of the East Texas A&M Lions men's basketball team.

== Playing career ==
von Rosenberg played high school basketball at Sharyland High School in Mission, Texas, before playing at Collin County Community College. von Rosenberg would transfer and play college basketball at Hartford where he was the school's all-time leader in career free throw percentage (.831) and ranked in the top 10 in career assists and steals upon graduation.

== Coaching career ==
von Rosenberg began his coaching career in 2009 as an assistant at Collin County Community College. In 2011, von Rosenberg was hired as an assistant coach under Joe Golding at Abilene Christian. He was hired under Sam Walker at Texas A&M–Commerce in 2013 before returning to his alma mater Hartford in 2015 as an assistant.

In 2017, von Rosenberg was hired as head coach at Texas A&M–Commerce, replacing Sam Walker.

== Head coaching record ==
Record table
Season	Team	Overall	Conference	Standing	Postseason
Texas A&M–Commerce Lions (Lone Star Conference) (2017–2022)
2017–18	Texas A&M–Commerce	22–9	12–6	T–3rd	NCAA Division II Regional semifinals
2018–19	Texas A&M–Commerce	24–9	13–5	T–2nd	NCAA Division II Regional semifinals
2019–20	Texas A&M–Commerce	18–12	13–9	1st (North)	
2020–21	Texas A&M–Commerce	7–7	7–7	T–3rd (North)	
2021–22	Texas A&M–Commerce	17–9	9–5	T–4th	NCAA Division II first round
Texas A&M–Commerce / East Texas A&M Lions (Southland Conference) (2022–present)
2022–23	Texas A&M–Commerce	13–20	9–9	5th	
2023–24	Texas A&M–Commerce	13–20	6–12	7th	
2024–25	East Texas A&M	5–26	3–17	11th	
2025–26	East Texas A&M	11–21	6–16	11th	
2026–27	East Texas A&M	0–0	0–0		
East Texas A&M:		130–133 (.494)	78–86 (.476)		
Total:		130–133 (.494)			
National champion Postseason invitational champion Conference regular season champion Conference regular season and conference tournament champion Division regular season champion Division regular season and conference tournament champion Conference tournament champion
