= 2008 America East men's basketball tournament =

- Classification: Division I
- Season: 2007–08
- First round site: Binghamton University Events Center; Vestal, New York
- Quarterfinals site: Binghamton University Events Center; Vestal, New York
- Semifinals site: Binghamton University Events Center; Vestal, New York
- Finals site: Retriever Activities Center; Catonsville, Maryland
- Champions: UMBC (1st title)
- Winning coach: Randy Monroe (1st title)
- MVP: Jay Greene (UMBC)

2007–08 America East men's basketball standings
	Conf.				Overall
Team	W		L	PCT	W		L	PCT
UMBC †	13	–	3	.813	24	–	9	.727
Hartford	10	–	6	.625	18	–	16	.529
Albany	10	–	6	.625	15	–	15	.500
Vermont	9	–	7	.563	16	–	15	.516
Binghamton	9	–	7	.563	14	–	16	.467
Boston University	9	–	7	.563	14	–	17	.452
New Hampshire	6	–	10	.375	9	–	20	.310
Stony Brook	3	–	13	.188	7	–	23	.233
Maine	3	–	13	.188	7	–	23	.233
† America East tournament winner As of March 17, 2008; Rankings from AP Poll

The 2008 America East men's basketball tournament was held from March 7–9 at the Binghamton University Events Center. The final was held March 15 at the Retriever Activities Center. As winners, the UMBC Retrievers win an automatic berth to the 2008 NCAA Men's Division I Basketball Tournament for the first time in their 22-year Division I history, with their win over Hartford. UMBC was given the 15th seed in the Midwest Regional of the NCAA Tournament and lost in the first round to Georgetown 66–47.

== Bracket and Results ==
First round Friday, March 7
8	Stony Brook	73
9	Maine	65

Quarterfinals; Saturday, March 8
1	UMBC	76
8	Stony Brook	60
4	Vermont	65
5	Binghamton	57
2	Hartford	68
7	New Hampshire	65
3	Albany	64^{OT}
6	Boston University	68

Semifinals; Sunday, March 9
1	UMBC	73
4	Vermont	64
2	Hartford	59
6	Boston University	52

Final; Saturday, March 15
1	UMBC	82
2	Hartford	65

== See also ==
- America East Conference
