= 2007–08 UMBC Retrievers men's basketball team =

American college basketball season

2007–08 UMBC Retrievers men's basketball

America East champions

NCAA tournament, first round
- Conference: America East Conference
- Record: 24–8 (13–3 America East)
- Head coach: Randy Monroe (4th season)
- Home arena: RAC Arena

2007–08 America East men's basketball standings
	Conf.				Overall
Team	W		L	PCT	W		L	PCT
UMBC †	13	–	3	.813	24	–	9	.727
Hartford	10	–	6	.625	18	–	16	.529
Albany	10	–	6	.625	15	–	15	.500
Vermont	9	–	7	.563	16	–	15	.516
Binghamton	9	–	7	.563	14	–	16	.467
Boston University	9	–	7	.563	14	–	17	.452
New Hampshire	6	–	10	.375	9	–	20	.310
Stony Brook	3	–	13	.188	7	–	23	.233
Maine	3	–	13	.188	7	–	23	.233
† America East tournament winner As of March 17, 2008; Rankings from AP Poll

The 2007–08 UMBC Retrievers men's basketball team represented University of Maryland, Baltimore County in the 2007–08 NCAA Division I men's basketball season.

UMBC appeared in the NCAA tournament for the first time in the team's history

== Schedule and results ==
Date time, TV	Rank^{#}	Opponent^{#}	Result	Record	Site (attendance) city, state
Non-conference regular season
November 10, 2007*; 7:30 pm		Saint Peter's	W 81–78	1–0	RAC Arena (2,942); Catonsville, MD
November 13, 2007*		at La Salle	W 76–69	2-0	Tom Gola Arena (2,382); Philadelphia, PA
November 17, 2007*		at Richmond	W 70–68	3–0	Robins Center (3,850); Richmond, VA
November 20, 2007*		at Lafayette	L 84–87	3–1	Kirby Sports Center (2,073); Easton, PA
November 24, 2007*		George Washington	W 89–79	4–1	RAC Arena (2,312); Catonsville, MD
November 29, 2007*; 7:30pm		Morgan State	W 84–76	5–1	RAC Arena (2,451); Catonsville, MD
December 1, 2007*; 2:00pm		at American	W 83–68	6–1	Bender Arena (1,213); Washington, D.C.
December 4, 2007*; 8:05pm		at Wichita State	L 68–77	6–2	Charles Koch Arena (10,478); Wichita, KS
December 8, 2007*		Goucher	W 82–37	7–2	RAC Arena (1,923); Catonsville, MD
December 11, 2007*; 7:00pm		at Central Connecticut	L 54–58	7–3	William H. Detrick Gymnasium (1,164); New Britain, CT
December 15, 2007*; 4:00pm		at West Virginia	L 62–86	7–4	WVU Coliseum (8,371); Morgantown, WV
December 22, 2007*; 2:00pm		Hampton	W 83–65	8–4	RAC Arena (1,762); Catonsville, MD
December 29, 2007*; 11:00 am, BTN		at Ohio State	L 83–92	8–5	Schottenstein Center (17,847); Columbus, OH
America East regular season
January 3, 2008		at Stony Brook	W 76–62	9-5 (1-0)	Pritchard Gymnasium (817); Stony Brook, NY
January 6, 2008		at New Hampshire	W 86–73	10-5 (2-0)	Lundholm Gym (586); Durham, NH
January 9, 2008		Vermont	W 78–60	11-5 (3-0)	RAC Arena (2,207); Catonsville, MD
January 12, 2008		Maine	L 74–77	11-6 (3-1)	RAC Arena (2,510); Catonsville, MD
January 16, 2008		Hartford	W 86–85	12-6 (4-1)	RAC Arena (1,881); Catonsville, MD
January 19, 2008		at Binghamton	L 59–62	12-7 (4-2)	Binghamton University Events Center (3,507); Binghamton, NY
January 22, 2008		at Boston University	W 62–40	13-7 (5-2)	Case Gym (493); Boston, MA
January 30, 2008		Albany	W 69–65	14-7 (6-2)	RAC Arena (3,381); Catonsville, MD
February 2, 2008		Vermont	W 75–73	15-7 (7-2)	Patrick Gym (3,266); Burlington, VT
February 6, 2008		Stony Brook	W 75–63	16-7 (8-2)	RAC Arena (2,895); Catonsville, MD
February 9, 2008		Binghamton	W 63–59	17-7 (9-2)	RAC Arena (2,606); Catonsville, MD
February 17, 2008		Boston University	W 76–73	18-7 (10-2)	RAC Arena (3,492); Catonsville, MD
February 20, 2008		at Albany	W 81–77 ^{OT}	19-7 (11-2)	SEFCU Arena (3,380); Albany, NY
February 23, 2008		New Hampshire	W 71–68 ^{OT}	20-7 (12-2)	RAC Arena (3,712); Catonsville, MD
February 28, 2008		at Maine	W 85–68	21-7 (13-2)	Alfond Arena (1,357); Orono, ME
March 2, 2008		at Hartford	L 57–58	21-8 (13-3)	Chase Arena at Reich Family Pavilion (2,637); West Hartford, CT
America East tournament
March 8, 2008	(1)	(8) Stony Brook; Quarterfinals	W 76–60	22-8	University Events Center (5,016); Binghamton, NY
March 9, 2008	(1)	(4) Vermont; Semifinals	W 73–64	23-8	University Events Center (3,024); Binghamton, NY
March 15, 2008; 12:00 pm, ESPN2	(1)	(2) Hartford; Championship	W 82–65	24–8	RAC Arena (3,810); Catonsville, MD
NCAA tournament
March 21, 2008; 3:00pm, CBS		Georgetown; First Round	L 47–66	24-9	RBC Center (19,477); Raleigh, NC
