= Hartford Hawks men's basketball =

American college basketball team

- University: University of Hartford
- Head coach: Aaron Toomey (1st season)
- Location: West Hartford, Connecticut
- Arena: Chase Arena at Reich Family Pavilion (capacity: 4,017)
- Conference: Conference of New England
- Nickname: Hawks
- Colors: Scarlet and white
- All-time record: 932–1,104 (.458)

NCAA Division I tournament Sweet Sixteen
- Division II: 1972, 1974

NCAA Division I tournament appearances
- Division I: 2021; DII: 1972, 1973, 1974, 1975

Conference tournament champions
- Division I: 2021

Uniforms
Home	Away

The Hartford Hawks men's basketball team is the basketball team that represents University of Hartford in West Hartford, Connecticut. The school's team currently competes as a member of the NCAA Division III Conference of New England.

== History ==
=== 2008 ===
In 2008, Hartford made the America East tournament championship game falling to UMBC 65–82.

=== 2021 ===
In 2021, they defeated UMass Lowell, 64–50, to make their first NCAA Division I Tournament.

=== Move to Division III ===
On May 6, 2021, the University of Hartford Board of Regents voted to drop its athletic department to Division III. The drop was set to take place no later than September 1, 2025, and eventually followed that schedule,

The most notable basketball player to play for Hartford is Vin Baker, who played parts of 14 seasons in the NBA, was named to four All-Star Games, and won a gold medal for the United States men's basketball team at the 2000 Sydney Olympics. Hartford has retired his jersey.

== Facilities ==
Hartford plays their home games at Chase Arena at Reich Family Pavilion. In 2015 the men's locker room was expanded and refurbished.

== Players ==
=== Retired numbers ===
No.	Player	Pos.	Years
42	Vin Baker	C	1989–93

== Head coaches ==
- A. Peter LoMaglio (1949–1955)
- Abe Silverman (1955–1957)
- Roy Spear (1957–1962)
- Gordon McCullough (1962–1976)
- Garry Palladino (1976–1981)
- Jack Phelan (1981–1992)
- Paul Brazeau (1992–2000)
- Larry Harrison (2000–2006)
- Dan Leibovitz (2006–2010)
- John Gallagher (2010–2022)
- Tom Devitt (interim; 2022–2023)
- Aaron Toomey (2023–present)

== Yearly results ==
Statistics overview
Season	Coach	Overall	Conference	Standing	Postseason
Peter A. LoMaglio () (1949–1955)
1949–50	Peter A. LoMaglio	7–13			
1950–51	Peter A. LoMaglio	13–7			
1951–52	Peter A. LoMaglio	14–6			
1952–53	Peter A. LoMaglio	20–7			
1953–54	Peter A. LoMaglio	11–8			
1954–55	Peter A. LoMaglio	10–11			
Peter A. LoMaglio:		75–52 (.591)			
Abe Silverman () (1955–1957)
1955–56	Abe Silverman	10–11			
1956–57	Abe Silverman	5–14			
Abe Silverman:		15–25 (.375)			
Roy Spear () (1957–1962)
1957–58	Roy Spear	9–13			
1958–59	Roy Spear	10–15			
1959–60	Roy Spear	7–13			
1960–61	Roy Spear	7–14			
1961–62	Roy Spear	7–13			
Roy Spear:		40–68 (.370)			
Gordon McCullough () (1962–1976)
1962–63	Gordon McCullough	11–11			
1963–64	Gordon McCullough	10–11			
1964–65	Gordon McCullough	12–10			
1965–66	Gordon McCullough	9–14			
1966–67	Gordon McCullough	9–11			
1967–68	Gordon McCullough	12–11			
1968–69	Gordon McCullough	17–7			
1969–70	Gordon McCullough	19–3			
1970–71	Gordon McCullough	15–8			
1971–72	Gordon McCullough	18–6			NCAA Division II Regional Final
1972–73	Gordon McCullough	17–7			NCAA Division II first round
1973–74	Gordon McCullough	20–4			NCAA Division II Regional Final
1974–75	Gordon McCullough	18–7			NCAA Division II Regional semifinals
1975–76	Gordon McCullough	14–7			
Gordon McCullough:		201–117 (.632)			
Gary Palladino () (1976–1981)
1976–77	Gary Palladino	19–8			
1977–78	Gary Palladino	15–11			
1978–79	Gary Palladino	12–14			
1979–80	Gary Palladino	6–21			
1980–81	Gary Palladino	9–16			
Gary Palladino:		61–70 (.466)			
Jack Phelan (ECACN, NAC) (1981–1992)
1981–82	Jack Phelan	8–20			
1982–83	Jack Phelan	9–18			
1983–84	Jack Phelan	12–15			
1984–85	Jack Phelan	7–21			
Division I
1985–86	Jack Phelan	12–16	10–8	6th	
1986–87	Jack Phelan	14–14	8–10	6th	
1987–88	Jack Phelan	15–16	12–6	3rd	
1988–89	Jack Phelan	15–13	10–7	5th	
1989–90	Jack Phelan	17–11	8–4	3rd	
1990–91	Jack Phelan	13–16	5–5	5th	
1991–92	Jack Phelan	6–21	3–11	8th	
Jack Phelan:		128–181 (.414)			
Paul Brazeau (NAC, America East Conference) (1992–2000)
1992–93	Paul Brazeau	14–14	7–7	4th	
1993–94	Paul Brazeau	16–12	9–5	3rd	
1994–95	Paul Brazeau	11–16	7–9	4th	
1995–96	Paul Brazeau	6–22	5–13	9th	
1996–97	Paul Brazeau	17–11	11–7	3rd	
1997–98	Paul Brazeau	15–12	11–7	4th	
1998–99	Paul Brazeau	11–16	9–9	5th	
1999-00	Paul Brazeau	10–19	6–12	7th	
Paul Brazeau:		100–122 (.450)			
Larry Harrison (America East Conference) (2000–2006)
2000–01	Larry Harrison	4–24	1–17	10th	
2001–02	Larry Harrison	14–18	10–6	3rd	
2002–03	Larry Harrison	16–13	10–6	3rd	
2003–04	Larry Harrison	12–17	6–12	6th	
2004–05	Larry Harrison	8–20	4–14	10th	
2005–06	Larry Harrison	13–15	8–7	4th	
Larry Harrison:		67–107 (.385)	39–62 (.386)		
Dan Leibovitz (America East Conference) (2006–2010)
2006–07	Dan Leibovitz	13–18	6–10		
2007–08	Dan Leibovitz	18–16	10–6		
2008–09	Dan Leibovitz	7–26	2–14		
2009–10	Dan Leibovitz	8–22	6–10		
Dan Leibovitz:		46–82 (.359)	24–40 (.375)		
John Gallagher (America East Conference) (2010–2022)
2010–11	John Gallagher	11–20	7–9	6th	
2011–12	John Gallagher	9–22	7–9	6th	
2012–13	John Gallagher	17–14	10–6	4th	CIT first round
2013–14	John Gallagher	17–16	10–6	3rd	
2014–15	John Gallagher	14–16	7–9	5th	
2015–16	John Gallagher	10–23	4–12	T-7th	
2016–17	John Gallagher	9–23	4–12	7th	
2017–18	John Gallagher	19–14	11–5	3rd	CIT first round
2018–19	John Gallagher	18–15	10–6	4th	
2019–20	John Gallagher	18–15	9–7	3rd	
2020–21	John Gallagher	15–9	8–6	4th	NCAA Division I first round
2021–22	John Gallagher	12–20	9–9	4th	
John Gallagher:		169–207 (.449)	96–96 (.500)		
Tom Devitt (interim) (Independent) (2022–2023)
2022–23	Tom Devitt	5–23	–	–	–
Tom Devitt:		5–23 (.179)			
Aaron Toomey (Commonwealth Coast Conference/Conference of New England) (2023–present)
Division III
2023–24	Aaron Toomey	7–18	5–13	N/A (Note: Due to Hartford's status as a reclassifying Division III member, Hartford's games did not count in conference standings.)	–
Aaron Toomey:		7–18 (.280)			
Total:		914–1,078 (.459)			
National champion Postseason invitational champion Conference regular season champion Conference regular season and conference tournament champion Division regular season champion Division regular season and conference tournament champion Conference tournament champion

== Postseason ==
=== NCAA Division I Tournament results ===
The Hawks have appeared in the NCAA Division I Tournament once. Their record is 0–1.

Year	Seed	Round	Opponent	Result
2021	16	First round	(1) Baylor	L 55–79

=== NCAA Division II Tournament results ===
The Hawks have appeared in the NCAA Division II Tournament four times. Their combined record is 2–5.

Year	Round	Opponent	Result
1972	Regional semifinals Regional Finals	Ithaca; Southampton	W 81–66; L 74–86
1973	Regional Quarterfinals	Saint Michael's	L 97–108
1974	Regional semifinals Regional Finals	Saint Michael's; Assumption	W 102–93; L 68–84
1975	Regional semifinals Regional 3rd-place game	Bentley; Sacred Heart	L 82–99; L 91–102

=== CIT results ===
The Hawks have appeared in the CollegeInsider.com Postseason Tournament (CIT) two times. Their combined record is 0–2.

Year	Round	Opponent	Result
2013	First round	Rider	L 54–63
2018	First round	San Diego	L 72–88
