= 2011–12 Long Island Blackbirds men's basketball team =

American college basketball season

2011–12 Long Island Blackbirds men's basketball

Northeast Conference regular season & tournament champions

NCAA Tournament, Round of 64
- Conference: Northeast Conference
- Record: 25–9 (16–2 NEC)
- Head coach: Jim Ferry (10th season)
- Assistant coaches: Jack Perri; Rich Glesmann; Jason Harris
- Home arena: Athletic, Recreation & Wellness Center

2011–12 Northeast Conference men's basketball standings
	Conf.				Overall
Team	W		L	PCT	W		L	PCT
Long Island †	16	–	2	.889	25	–	9	.735
Wagner	15	–	3	.833	25	–	6	.806
Robert Morris	13	–	5	.722	26	–	10	.722
St. Francis (NY)	12	–	6	.667	15	–	15	.500
Quinnipiac	10	–	8	.556	18	–	14	.563
Monmouth	10	–	8	.556	12	–	20	.375
Central Connecticut	10	–	8	.556	13	–	16	.448
Sacred Heart	8	–	10	.444	14	–	18	.438
Mount St. Mary's	6	–	12	.333	8	–	21	.276
Saint Francis (PA)	5	–	13	.278	6	–	23	.207
Fairleigh Dickinson	2	–	16	.111	3	–	26	.103
*Bryant	1	–	17	.056	2	–	28	.067
† 2012 Northeast Conference tournament winner As of March 17, 2012; Rankings from AP Poll; *Ineligible for conference tournament

The 2011–12 Long Island Blackbirds men's basketball team represented The Brooklyn Campus of Long Island University during the 2011–12 NCAA Division I men's basketball season. The Blackbirds, led by tenth year head coach Jim Ferry, played their home games at the Athletic, Recreation & Wellness Center and are members of the Northeast Conference. They finished the season 25–9, 16–2 in NEC play to be crowned regular season champions. They also were champions of the Northeast Conference tournament to earn the conference's automatic bid into the 2012 NCAA tournament where they lost in the second round to Michigan State.

== Roster ==
Number	Name	Position	Height	Weight	Year	Hometown
00	Pete Aguilar	Guard	6–2	200	Freshman	Bronx, New York
1	Jamal Olasewere	Forward	6–7	215	Junior	Silver Spring, Maryland
3	C.J. Garner	Guard	5–10	160	Junior	Silver Spring, Maryland
4	Garrell Martin	Guard	6–2	175	Freshman	Bronx, New York
5	Troy Joseph	Guard/Forward	6–6	200	Freshman	Toronto, Ontario
11	Brandon Thompson	Guard	6–1	185	Junior	San Antonio, Texas
15	Jason Brickman	Guard	5–10	165	Sophomore	San Antonio, Texas
20	Booker Hucks	Forward	6–6	210	Junior	Bay Shore, New York
21	Arnold Mayorga	Forward	6–7	210	Senior	London, Ontario
22	Robinson Odoch Opong	Guard	6–3	200	Sophomore	Quebec City, Quebec
23	Michael Culpo	Guard	6–1	180	Senior	Pittsfield, Massachusetts
32	Kenny Onyechi	Forward	6–8	230	Junior	Sugar Land, Texas
34	Kurt Joseph	Guard	5–10	180	Junior	Morganville, New Jersey
42	Julian Boyd	Forward	6–7	230	Junior	San Antonio, Texas

== Schedule ==
Date time, TV	Rank^{#}	Opponent^{#}	Result	Record	Site (attendance) city, state
Exhibition
November 4, 2011*; 7:30 pm		Adelphi	W 74–66		Athletic, Recreation & Wellness Center (674); Brooklyn, NY
Regular season
November 11, 2011*; 7:00 pm		at Hofstra	L 71–89	0–1	Hofstra Arena (3,589); Hempstead, NY
November 14, 2011*; 7:00 pm		at Old Dominion; Hall of Fame Tip-Off Tournament	L 69–77	0–2	Ted Constant Convocation Center (6,624); Norfolk, VA
November 16, 2011*; 7:00 pm		at Penn State; Hall of Fame Tip-Off Tournament	L 68–77	0–3	Bryce Jordan Center (5,258); University Park, PA
November 19, 2011*; 8:00 pm		vs. Adelphi; Hall of Fame Tip-Off Tournament	W 60–47	1–3	Mohegan Sun Arena; Uncasville, CT
November 20, 2011*; 5:30 pm		vs. Vermont; Hall of Fame Tip-Off Tournament	W 80–75	2–3	Mohegan Sun Arena (1,223); Uncasville, CT
November 28, 2011*; 7:00 pm		at Iona	L 84–100	2–4	Hynes Athletic Center (2,520); New Rochelle, NY
December 1, 2011; 7:00 pm		Wagner	W 78–73	3–4 (1–0)	Athletic, Recreation & Wellness Center (1,201); Brooklyn, NY
December 3, 2011; 7:00 pm		at Mount St. Mary's	W 85–76	4–4 (2–0)	Knott Arena (1,146); Emmitsburg, MD
December 5, 2011*; 7:00 pm		at Lafayette	W 82–80	5–4	Kirby Sports Center (780); Easton, PA
December 10, 2011*; 2:00 pm		at Columbia	L 53–63	5–5	Levien Gymnasium (874); New York City, NY
December 14, 2011*; 7:00 pm		at Norfolk State	L 62–73	5–6	Joseph G. Echols Memorial Hall (504); Norfolk, VA
December 17, 2011*; 2:00 pm		Saint Peter's	W 82–80	6–6	Athletic, Recreation & Wellness Center (623); Brooklyn, NY
December 20, 2011*; 7:00 pm		Texas State	W 100–84	7–6	Athletic, Recreation & Wellness Center (519); Brooklyn, NY
December 30, 2011*; 7:00 pm		NJIT	W 84–74	8–6	Athletic, Recreation & Wellness Center (527); Brooklyn, NY
January 5, 2012; 7:00 pm		at Sacred Heart	W 87–81	9–6 (3–0)	William H. Pitt Center (494); Fairfield, CT
January 7, 2012; 2:00 pm		at Quinnipiac	W 79–75	10–6 (4–0)	TD Bank Sports Center (2,089); Hamden, CT
January 12, 2012; 7:00 pm		Fairleigh Dickinson	W 82–64	11–6 (5–0)	Athletic, Recreation & Wellness Center (639); Brooklyn, NY
January 14, 2012; 4:30 pm		Monmouth	W 106–86	12–6 (6–0)	Athletic, Recreation & Wellness Center (680); Brooklyn, NY
January 19, 2012; 7:00 pm		Mount St. Mary's	W 77–62	13–6 (7–0)	Athletic, Recreation & Wellness Center (1,162); Brooklyn, NY
January 21, 2012; 7:00 pm, ESPNU		at Wagner	W 73–66	14–6 (8–0)	Spiro Sports Center (2,412); Staten Island, NY
January 26, 2012; 7:00 pm, MSG		at Robert Morris	L 66–75	14–7 (8–1)	Charles L. Sewall Center (1,845); Moon Township, PA
January 28, 2012; 7:00 pm		at Saint Francis (PA)	W 97–76	15–7 (9–1)	DeGol Arena (1,246); Loretto, PA
February 2, 2022; 7:00 pm		Adelphi	W 75–70	16–7 (10–1)	Athletic, Recreation & Wellness Center (1,121); Brooklyn, NY
February 4, 2022; 4:30 pm		Central Connecticut	W 95–80	17–7 (11–1)	Athletic, Recreation & Wellness Center (1,498); Brooklyn, NY
February 8, 2022; 9:15 pm		vs. St. Francis (NY)	W 86–77	18–7 (12–1)	Madison Square Garden (7,618); New York City, NY
February 12, 2022; 4:30 pm, MSG		St. Francis (NY); Battle of Brooklyn	W 81–78	19–7 (13–1)	Athletic, Recreation & Wellness Center (1,472); Brooklyn, NY
February 16, 2022; 7:00 pm		Sacred Heart	W 103–91	20–7 (14–1)	Athletic, Recreation & Wellness Center (1,028); Brooklyn, NY
February 18, 2022; 4:30 pm		Quinnipiac	W 99–89	21–7 (15–1)	Athletic, Recreation & Wellness Center (1,172); Brooklyn, NY
February 23, 2022; 7:00 pm		at Fairleigh Dickinson	W 91–80	22–7 (16–1)	Rothman Center (512); Teaneck, NJ
February 25, 2022; 7:00 pm		at Monmouth	L 78–106	22–8 (16–2)	Multipurpose Activity Center (1,980); West Long Branch, NJ
NEC tournament
March 1, 2012; 7:00 pm	(1)	(8) Sacred Heart; Quarterfinals	W 80–68	23–8	Athletic, Recreation & Wellness Center (1,112); Brooklyn, NY
March 4, 2012; 6:00 pm, MSG/FCS	(1)	(5) Quinnipiac; Semifinals	W 78–75	24–8	Athletic, Recreation & Wellness Center (1,327); Brooklyn, NY
March 7, 2012; 7:00 pm, ESPN2	(1)	(3) Robert Morris; Championship Game	W 90–73	25–8	Athletic, Recreation & Wellness Center (1,700); Brooklyn, NY
NCAA tournament
March 16, 2012*; 9:20 pm, TBS	(W 16)	vs. (W 1) No. 5 Michigan State; Second Round	L 67–89	25–9	Nationwide Arena (17,464); Columbus, OH
*Non-conference game. ^{#}Rankings from AP Poll. (#) Tournament seedings in parentheses. All times are in Eastern Time.
