= 2010–11 Long Island Blackbirds men's basketball team =

American college basketball season

2010–11 Long Island Blackbirds men's basketball

Northeast Conference regular season and tournament champions

NCAA Tournament, Round of 64
- Conference: Northeast Conference
- Record: 27–6 (16–2 NEC)
- Head coach: Jim Ferry
- Assistant coaches: Jack Perri; Rich Glesmann; Jason Harris
- Home arena: Athletic, Recreation & Wellness Center

2010–11 Northeast Conference men's basketball standings
	Conf.				Overall
Team	W		L	PCT	W		L	PCT
† Long Island	16	–	2	.889	27	–	6	.818
Quinnipiac	13	–	5	.722	22	–	10	.688
Robert Morris	12	–	6	.667	18	–	14	.563
Central Connecticut State	11	–	7	.611	19	–	12	.613
St. Francis (NY)	10	–	8	.556	15	–	15	.500
Wagner	9	–	9	.500	13	–	17	.433
Mount St. Mary's	9	–	9	.500	11	–	21	.344
Bryant*	7	–	11	.389	9	–	21	.300
St. Francis (PA)	7	–	11	.389	9	–	21	.300
Sacred Heart	6	–	12	.333	11	–	18	.379
Monmouth	5	–	13	.278	9	–	21	.300
Fairleigh Dickinson	3	–	15	.167	5	–	24	.172
† 2011 Northeast Conference tournament winner As of March 17, 2012; Rankings from AP Poll; *Ineligible for conference tournament

The 2010–11 Long Island Blackbirds men's basketball team represented Long Island University during the 2010–11 NCAA Division I men's basketball season. The Blackbirds, led by 9th year head coach Jim Ferry, played their home games at the Athletic, Recreation & Wellness Center and are members of the Northeast Conference. They finished the season 27–6, 16–2 in NEC play to capture the regular season championship. They also won the 2011 Northeast Conference men's basketball tournament to earn an automatic bid in the 2011 NCAA Division I men's basketball tournament where they lost in the second round to North Carolina.

== Roster ==
Number	Name	Position	Height	Weight	Year	Hometown
00	Kyle Johnson	Guard	6–5	210	Senior	Toronto, Ontario, Canada
1	Jamal Olasewere	Forward	6–7	210	Sophomore	Silver Spring, Maryland
2	Milos Nikolic	Forward	6–10	205	Senior	Lugano, Switzerland
10	Troy Joseph	Guard/Forward	6–6	195	Freshman	Ajax, Ontario, Canada
11	Jason Brickman	Guard	5–10	165	Freshman	San Antonio, Texas
12	C.J. Garner	Guard	5–10	160	Junior	Silver Spring, Maryland
15	Kurt Joseph	Guard	5–10	180	Sophomore	Morganville, New Jersey
20	Booker Hucks	Guard	6–6	210	Sophomore	Bay Shore, New York
21	Arnold Mayorga	Forward	6–7	225	Junior	London, Ontario, Canada
22	Robinson Odoch Opong	Guard	6–3	200	Freshman	Quebec City, Quebec, Canada
23	Michael Culpo	Guard	6–1	180	Junior	Pittsfield, Massachusetts
24	David Hicks	Guard	6–1	195	Senior	Mendota Heights, Minnesota
32	Kenny Onyechi	Forward	6–7	225	Sophomore	Sugar Land, Texas
42	Julian Boyd	Forward	6–7	225	Sophomore	San Antonio, Texas

== Schedule ==
Date time, TV	Rank^{#}	Opponent^{#}	Result	Record	Site (attendance) city, state
Northeast Conference tournament
3/3/11; 7:00 pm		Saint Francis (PA); Quarterfinals	W 90–75	25–5	Athletic, Recreation & Wellness Center (1,072); Brooklyn, NY
3/6/11; 12:00 pm, MSG		Central Connecticut State; Semifinals	W 69–67	26–5	Athletic, Recreation & Wellness Center (1,205); Brooklyn, NY
3/9/11; 7:00 pm, ESPN2		Robert Morris; Championship Game	W 85–82 ^{OT}	27–5	Athletic, Recreation & Wellness Center (1,700); Brooklyn, NY
NCAA tournament
3/18/11*; 7:15 pm, CBS		vs. No. 7 North Carolina; Second Round	L 87–102	27–6	Time Warner Cable Arena (16,852); Charlotte, NC
*Non-conference game. ^{#}Rankings from AP Poll. (#) Tournament seedings in parentheses. All times are in Eastern Time.
