= 2012 Northeast Conference men's basketball tournament =

- NEC Tournament Logo
- Classification: Division I
- Season: 2011–12
- Teams: 8
- Site: campus sites
- Finals site: Steinberg Wellness Center; Brooklyn, New York
- Champions: Long Island (4th title)
- Winning coach: Jim Ferry (2nd title)
- MVP: Julian Boyd (Long Island)

2011–12 Northeast Conference men's basketball standings
| | Conf. | | | | Overall |
| Team | W | | L | PCT | W | | L | PCT |
|---|---|---|---|---|---|---|---|---|
| Long Island † | 16 | – | 2 | .889 | 25 | – | 9 | .735 |
| Wagner | 15 | – | 3 | .833 | 25 | – | 6 | .806 |
| Robert Morris | 13 | – | 5 | .722 | 26 | – | 10 | .722 |
| St. Francis (NY) | 12 | – | 6 | .667 | 15 | – | 15 | .500 |
| Quinnipiac | 10 | – | 8 | .556 | 18 | – | 14 | .563 |
| Monmouth | 10 | – | 8 | .556 | 12 | – | 20 | .375 |
| Central Connecticut | 10 | – | 8 | .556 | 13 | – | 16 | .448 |
| Sacred Heart | 8 | – | 10 | .444 | 14 | – | 18 | .438 |
| Mount St. Mary's | 6 | – | 12 | .333 | 8 | – | 21 | .276 |
| Saint Francis (PA) | 5 | – | 13 | .278 | 6 | – | 23 | .207 |
| Fairleigh Dickinson | 2 | – | 16 | .111 | 3 | – | 26 | .103 |
| *Bryant | 1 | – | 17 | .056 | 2 | – | 28 | .067 |
† 2012 Northeast Conference tournament winner As of March 17, 2012; Rankings from AP Poll; *Ineligible for conference tournament

The 2012 Northeast Conference men's basketball tournament was held between March 1 and 7. All games were held on the campus sites of the higher seed. LIU Brooklyn won the championship, its fourth, and received the conferences automatic bid to the 2012 NCAA tournament. This was LIU's second NEC Tournament Championship in a row, having won it the previous year.

== Format ==
The top 8 teams in the standings will qualify for the tournament. The field will be re-seeded after the Quarterfinals so that the #1 seed will host the highest remaining seed, and #2 will host the lowest remaining seed. Bryant is in its final transition year and remains ineligible to participate in any post-season tournaments.

== Bracket ==
All games will be played at the venue of the higher seed.

Quarterfinals; Thursday, March 1
1 | Long Island | 80
8 | Sacred Heart | 68
4 | St. Francis (NY) | 72
5 | Quinnipiac | 80
(Pairings are reseeded after the first round)
2 | Wagner | 87
7 | Central Connecticut | 77
3 | Robert Morris | 87
6 | Monmouth | 68

Semifinals; Sunday, March 4 MSG
1 | Long Island | 78
5 | Quinnipiac | 75
2 | Wagner | 64
3 | Robert Morris | 71

Championship Game; Wednesday, March 7 ESPN2
1 | Long Island | 90
3 | Robert Morris | 73

== All-tournament team ==
Tournament MVP in bold.

| Name | School | Pos. | Year | Ht. | Hometown |
|---|---|---|---|---|---|
| **Julian Boyd** | LIU Brooklyn | Forward | Junior | 6-7 | San Antonio, Texas |
| Jason Brickman | LIU Brooklyn | Guard | Sophomore | 5-10 | San Antonio, Texas |
| Jamal Olasewere | LIU Brooklyn | Forward | Junior | 6-7 | Silver Spring, Maryland |
| Coron Williams | Robert Morris | Guard | Sophomore | 6-2 | Midlothian, Virginia |
| Velton Jones | Robert Morris | Guard | Junior | 6-0 | Philadelphia, Pennsylvania |
