= 2011 Northeast Conference men's basketball tournament =

- Classification: Division I
- Season: 2010–11
- Teams: 8
- Site: campus sites
- Finals site: Steinberg Wellness Center; Brooklyn, New York
- Champions: Long Island (3rd title)
- Winning coach: Jim Ferry (1st title)
- MVP: Jamal Olasewere (Long Island)

2010–11 Northeast Conference men's basketball standings
	Conf.				Overall
Team	W		L	PCT	W		L	PCT
† Long Island	16	–	2	.889	27	–	6	.818
Quinnipiac	13	–	5	.722	22	–	10	.688
Robert Morris	12	–	6	.667	18	–	14	.563
Central Connecticut State	11	–	7	.611	19	–	12	.613
St. Francis (NY)	10	–	8	.556	15	–	15	.500
Wagner	9	–	9	.500	13	–	17	.433
Mount St. Mary's	9	–	9	.500	11	–	21	.344
Bryant*	7	–	11	.389	9	–	21	.300
St. Francis (PA)	7	–	11	.389	9	–	21	.300
Sacred Heart	6	–	12	.333	11	–	18	.379
Monmouth	5	–	13	.278	9	–	21	.300
Fairleigh Dickinson	3	–	15	.167	5	–	24	.172
† 2011 Northeast Conference tournament winner As of March 17, 2012; Rankings from AP Poll; *Ineligible for conference tournament

The 2011 Northeast Conference men's basketball tournament took place March 3, 6, and 9, 2011, on campus sites. The semifinal games was televised on MSG Network, and the finals were on ESPN2. The winner, Long Island, received the NEC's automatic berth in the 2011 NCAA tournament.

== Format ==
For the seventh straight year, the NEC Men's Basketball Tournament will consist of an eight-team playoff format with all games played at the home of the higher seed. After the quarterfinals, the teams will be reseeded so the highest remaining seed plays the lowest remaining seed in the semifinals. Bryant is in transition to D-I and remains ineligible for any post-season tournaments and thus not allowed to participate.

== Bracket ==
Quarterfinals; March 3
1	Long Island	90
8	Saint Francis (PA)	75
4	Central Connecticut	64
5	St. Francis Brooklyn	62
(Pairings are reseeded after the first round)
3	Robert Morris	78
6	Wagner	74
2	Quinnipiac	78
7	Mount St. Mary's	59

Semifinals; March 6
1	Long Island	69
4	Cent Connecticut	67
3	Robert Morris	64
2	Quinnipiac	62

Finals; March 9
1	Long Island	85*
3	Robert Morris	82

Asterisk denotes an overtime.

== All-tournament team ==
Tournament MVP in bold.

Name	School	Pos.	Year	Ht.	Hometown
**Jamal Olasewere**	LIU Brooklyn	Forward	Sophomore	6-7	Silver Spring, Maryland
Jason Brickman	LIU Brooklyn	Guard	Freshman	5-10	San Antonio, Texas
Velton Jones	Robert Morris	Guard	Sophomore	6-0	Philadelphia, Pennsylvania
Russell Johnson	Robert Morris	Forward	Sophomore	6-6	Chester, Pennsylvania
Justin Rutty	Quinnipiac	Forward	Senior	6-7	Newburgh, New York
