= 2010–11 Quinnipiac Bobcats men's basketball team =

American college basketball season

2010–11 Quinnipiac Bobcats men's basketball
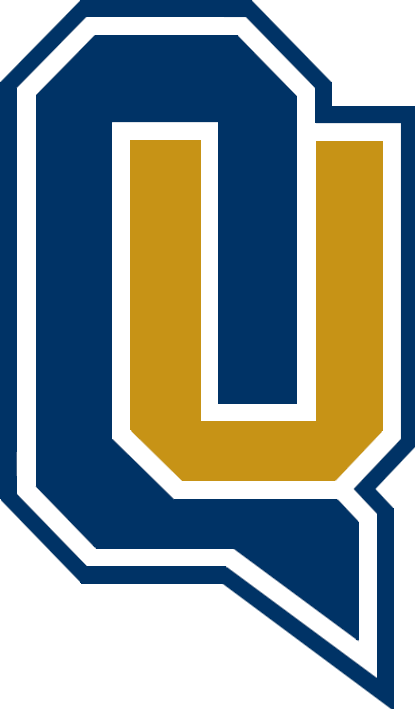

CIT, First round
- Conference: Northeast Conference
- Record: 22–10 (13–5 NEC)
- Head coach: Tom Moore (4th season)
- Assistant coaches: Sean Doherty (4th season); Eric Eaton (4th season); Scott Burrell (4th season)
- Home arena: TD Bank Sports Center

2010–11 Northeast Conference men's basketball standings
	Conf.				Overall
Team	W		L	PCT	W		L	PCT
† Long Island	16	–	2	.889	27	–	6	.818
Quinnipiac	13	–	5	.722	22	–	10	.688
Robert Morris	12	–	6	.667	18	–	14	.563
Central Connecticut State	11	–	7	.611	19	–	12	.613
St. Francis (NY)	10	–	8	.556	15	–	15	.500
Wagner	9	–	9	.500	13	–	17	.433
Mount St. Mary's	9	–	9	.500	11	–	21	.344
Bryant*	7	–	11	.389	9	–	21	.300
St. Francis (PA)	7	–	11	.389	9	–	21	.300
Sacred Heart	6	–	12	.333	11	–	18	.379
Monmouth	5	–	13	.278	9	–	21	.300
Fairleigh Dickinson	3	–	15	.167	5	–	24	.172
† 2011 Northeast Conference tournament winner As of March 17, 2012; Rankings from AP Poll; *Ineligible for conference tournament

The 2010–11 Quinnipiac Bobcats men's basketball team represented Quinnipiac University in the 2010–11 NCAA Division I men's basketball season. The Bobcats, led by head coach Tom Moore, played their home games at TD Bank Sports Center in Hamden, Connecticut, as members of the Northeast Conference. The Bobcats finished 2nd in the Northeast Conference during the regular season, and were eliminated in the semifinals of the NEC tournament by Robert Morris.

Quinnipiac failed to qualify for the NCAA tournament, but were invited to the 2011 CIT. The Bobcats lost in the first round of the CIT, where they were eliminated by Buffalo, 95–91.

== Roster ==
2010–11 Quinnipiac Bobcats men's basketball team
Players
Coaches

Pos.	#	Name	Height	Weight	Year	Hometown
G	1	Deontay Twyman	6 ft 0 in (1.83 m)	170 lb (77 kg)	Sr	Olney, Maryland
G	2	Dave Johnson	5 ft 10 in (1.78 m)	152 lb (69 kg)	So	Jackson, New Jersey
G	3	James Johnson	6 ft 0 in (1.83 m)	195 lb (88 kg)	Jr	Queens, New York
F	4	Ike Azotam	6 ft 6 in (1.98 m)	225 lb (102 kg)	Fr	Boston, Massachusetts
G	5	Lance Brown	6 ft 3 in (1.91 m)	195 lb (88 kg)	So	Teaneck, New Jersey
G	10	Garvey Young	6 ft 5 in (1.96 m)	190 lb (86 kg)	Jr	Washington, D.C.
F	11	Raheem May–Thompson	6 ft 6 in (1.98 m)	215 lb (98 kg)	So	London, England
F	12	Justin Rutty	6 ft 7 in (2.01 m)	255 lb (116 kg)	Sr	Newburgh, New York
G	13	Austin Alecxih	6 ft 6 in (1.98 m)	200 lb (91 kg)	So	Columbia, Pennsylvania
G	20	Sean Light	6 ft 5 in (1.96 m)	205 lb (93 kg)	Sr	Colts Neck, New Jersey
G	22	William Harrison	6 ft 3 in (1.91 m)	175 lb (79 kg)	Jr	The Bronx, New York
F	23	Tevin Baskin	6 ft 6 in (1.98 m)	210 lb (95 kg)	Fr	Stamford, Connecticut
G	24	Dominigue Langston	6 ft 3 in (1.91 m)	217 lb (98 kg)	Fr	Bridgeport, Connecticut
G	33	Kevin Tarca	5 ft 10 in (1.78 m)	165 lb (75 kg)	Jr	Skillman, New Jersey
F	35	Jamee Jackson	6 ft 7 in (2.01 m)	226 lb (103 kg)	So	Newark, New Jersey

Head coach

- Tom Moore (Boston University)

Assistant coach(es)

- Sean Doherty (Worcester State)
- Eric Eaton (UMass Dartmouth)
- Scott Burrell (Connecticut)

Legend

- (C) Team captain
- (S) Suspended
- (I) Ineligible
- (W) Walk-on
- Injured
- Current redshirt

Roster
Last update: January 22, 2023

== Schedule and results ==
Date time, TV	Rank^{#}	Opponent^{#}	Result	Record	Site (attendance) city, state
Regular season
November 13, 2010*; 8:00 pm		vs. Yale; Connecticut 6 Classic	W 84–75	1–0	Mohegan Sun Arena (3,829); Uncasville, CT
November 16, 2010*; 7:00 pm		Hartford	W 66–64	2–0	TD Bank Sports Center (1,895); Hamden, CT
November 20, 2010*; 3:00 pm		Vermont	L 75–79	2–1	TD Bank Sports Center (2,321); Hamden, CT
November 23, 2010*; 7:00 pm		at Dartmouth	W 69–52	3–1	Leede Arena (804); Hanover, NH
November 29, 2010*; 7:00 pm		Maine	W 75–67	4–1	TD Bank Sports Center (1,879); Hamden, CT
December 1, 2010*; 7:00 pm		at UMass	L 64–66	4–2	Mullins Center (1,914); Amherst, MA
December 4, 2010; 2:00 pm		Mount St. Mary's	W 77–75	5–2 (1–0)	TD Bank Sports Center (1,744); Hamden, CT
December 7, 2010*; 7:00 pm		Lehigh	W 84–78	6–2	TD Bank Sports Center (1,202); Hamden, CT
December 11, 2010*; 3:00 pm		Rhode Island	W 73–66	7–2	TD Bank Sports Center (2,909); Hamden, CT
December 22, 2010*; 7:00 pm		at Niagara	W 88–63	8–2	Gallagher Center (1,563); Lewiston, NY
December 29, 2010*; 7:00 pm		at Boston University	W 82–81	9–2	Case Gym (700); Boston, MA
January 3, 2011; 7:00 pm		Wagner	L 68–73	9–3 (1–1)	TD Bank Sports Center; Hamden, CT
January 6, 2011; 7:00 pm		at Monmouth	W 72–70	10–3 (2–1)	Multipurpose Activity Center (1,003); West Long Branch, NJ
January 8, 2011; 4:00 pm		at Fairleigh Dickinson	W 66–56	11–3 (3–1)	Rothman Center (1,093); Hackensack, NJ
January 13, 2011; 7:30 pm		Bryant	L 61–69	11–4 (3–2)	TD Bank Sports Center (985); Hamden, CT
January 15, 2011; 4:00 pm		Central Connecticut	W 73–68	12–4 (4–2)	TD Bank Sports Center (2,634); Hamden, CT
January 17, 2011*; 1:00 pm		at Brown	L 78–87	12–5	Pizzitola Sports Center (829); Providence, RI
January 20, 2011; 7:00 pm		at Wagner	L 80–90	12–6 (4–3)	Spiro Sports Center (1,213); Staten Island, NY
January 22, 2011; 7:00 pm		at Mount St. Mary's	L 63–72	12–7 (4–4)	Knott Arena (1,278); Emmitsburg, MD
January 27, 2011; 7:00 pm		Robert Morris	W 69–61	13–7 (5–4)	TD Bank Sports Center (2,326); Hamden, CT
January 29, 2011; 2:00 pm		Saint Francis (PA)	W 75–55	14–7 (6–4)	TD Bank Sports Center (2,590); Hamden, CT
February 3, 2011; 7:00 pm		at St. Francis Brooklyn	W 74–60	15–7 (7–4)	Generoso Pope Athletic Complex (477); Brooklyn, NY
February 5, 2011; 5:30 pm		at Long Island	L 74–84	15–8 (7–5)	Wellness, Recreation, and Athletic Center (1,052); Brooklyn, NY
February 9, 2011; 7:00 pm		Sacred Heart	W 59–54	16–8 (8–5)	TD Bank Sports Center (1,566); Hamden, CT
February 14, 2011; 7:30 pm		Sacred Heart	W 55–48	17–8 (9–5)	William H. Pitt Center (1,046); Fairfield, CT
February 17, 2011; 7:00 pm		at Bryant	W 80–60	18–8 (10–5)	Chace Athletic Center (1,648); Smithfield, RI
February 19, 2011; 3:30 pm		at Central Connecticut	W 68–67	19–8 (11–5)	William H. Detrick Gymnasium (2,817); New Britain, CT
February 24, 2011; 7:00 pm		Monmouth	W 64–59	20–8 (12–5)	TD Bank Sports Center (1,997); Hamden, CT
February 26, 2011; 4:00 pm		Fairleigh Dickinson	W 71–60	21–8 (13–5)	TD Bank Sports Center (2,474); Hamden, CT
NEC tournament
March 3, 2011; 7:00 pm	(2)	(7) Mount St. Mary's; NEC Quarterfinals	W 78–59	22–8	TD Bank Sports Center (2,446); Hamden, CT
March 6, 2011; 2:00 pm	(2)	(3) Robert Morris; NEC Semifinals	L 62–64	22–9	TD Bank Sports Center (2,961); Hamden, CT
CollegeInsider.com tournament
March 14, 2011; 7:00 pm		Buffalo; CIT First Round	L 68–75	22–10	TD Bank Sports Center (1,055); Hamden, CT
*Non-conference game. ^{#}Rankings from AP Poll. (#) Tournament seedings in parentheses. All times are in Eastern Time.
