= 2011–12 Sacred Heart Pioneers men's basketball team =

American college basketball season

2011–12 Sacred Heart Pioneers men's basketball
- Conference: Northeast Conference
- Record: 14–17 (8–10 NEC)
- Head coach: Dave Bike
- Assistant coaches: Anthony Latina; Johnny Kidd; Drew Shubik
- Home arena: William H. Pitt Center

2011–12 Northeast Conference men's basketball standings
	Conf.				Overall
Team	W		L	PCT	W		L	PCT
Long Island †	16	–	2	.889	25	–	9	.735
Wagner	15	–	3	.833	25	–	6	.806
Robert Morris	13	–	5	.722	26	–	10	.722
St. Francis (NY)	12	–	6	.667	15	–	15	.500
Quinnipiac	10	–	8	.556	18	–	14	.563
Monmouth	10	–	8	.556	12	–	20	.375
Central Connecticut	10	–	8	.556	13	–	16	.448
Sacred Heart	8	–	10	.444	14	–	18	.438
Mount St. Mary's	6	–	12	.333	8	–	21	.276
Saint Francis (PA)	5	–	13	.278	6	–	23	.207
Fairleigh Dickinson	2	–	16	.111	3	–	26	.103
*Bryant	1	–	17	.056	2	–	28	.067
† 2012 Northeast Conference tournament winner As of March 17, 2012; Rankings from AP Poll; *Ineligible for conference tournament

The 2011–12 Sacred Heart Pioneers men's basketball team represented Sacred Heart University during the 2011–12 NCAA Division I men's basketball season. The Pioneers, led by thirty-fourth year head coach Dave Bike, played their home games at the William H. Pitt Center and were members of the Northeast Conference (NEC). They lost in the quarterfinals of the NEC tournament to Long Island.

== Recruiting ==
College recruiting
Name	Hometown	School	Height	Weight	Commit date
Phil Gaetano; G	Wallingford, Connecticut	Sheehan High School, Choate Rosemary Hall	5 ft 10 in (1.78 m)	170 lb (77 kg)	Nov 23, 2010
Phil Gaetano; G	Recruit ratings: Scout: Rivals: (78)				
Overall recruit ranking:
Note: In many cases, Scout, Rivals, 247Sports, On3, and ESPN may conflict in their listings of height and weight.; In these cases, the average was taken. ESPN grades are on a 100-point scale.; Sources: "2011 Team Ranking". Rivals.

== Roster ==
Number	Name	Position	Height	Weight	Year	Hometown
2	Evan Kelley	Guard	6–4	180	Sophomore	Norwalk, Connecticut
4	Phil Gaetano	Guard	5–10	170	Freshman	Wallingford, Connecticut
5	Justin Swidowski	Forward/center	6–9	215	Redshirt junior	Cinnaminson, New Jersey
10	Steve Zazuri (IR)	Guard	6–2	195	Senior	Monroe, Connecticut
11	Chris Evans	Guard/forward	6–3	210	Sophomore	Stamford, Connecticut
12	Louis Montes	Guard/forward	6–4	220	Redshirt sophomore	Brockton, Massachusetts
21	Femi Akinpetide	Forward	6–6	230	Redshirt junior	Sydney, Australia
24	Mostafa Abdel Latif	Forward	6–8	230	Junior (transfer, would sit out 2011–2012)	Alexandria, Egypt
25	Shane Gibson	Guard	6–2	180	Redshirt junior	Killingly, Connecticut
30	Nick Greenbacker	Forward/center	6–9	235	Redshirt junior	Coventry, Connecticut
31	Steve Glowiak	Guard	6–3	185	Redshirt freshman	New Britain, Connecticut
34	Stan Dulaire	Forward	6–5	205	Senior	Bloomfield, Connecticut

Roster:

== Schedule ==
Date time, TV	Rank^{#}	Opponent^{#}	Result	Record	Site city, state
Regular season
November 11, 2011*; 2:00 p.m.		vs. Hartford; Connecticut 6 Classic	W 70–50	1–0	Mohegan Sun Arena; Uncasville, CT
November 15, 2011*; 7:00 pm		at Stony Brook	W 74–63	2–0	William H. Pitt Center; Fairfield, CT
November 17, 2011*; 7:00 pm		at Rutgers; Cancún Challenge	L 75–91	2–1	Louis Brown Athletic Center; Piscataway, NJ
November 19, 2011*; 7:00 pm		at Richmond; Cancún Challenge	L 58–83	2–2	Robins Center; Richmond, VA
November 22, 2011*; 4:00 pm		vs. Hampton; Cancún Challenge	W 78–71	3–2	Moon Palace Resort; Cancún, Mexico
November 23, 2011*; 3:00 pm		vs. Lipscomb; Cancún Challenge	L 77–79	3–3	Moon Palace Resort; Cancún, Mexico
November 27, 2011*; 3:00 pm		Brown	W 77–64	4–3	William H. Pitt Center; Fairfield, CT
December 1, 2011; 7:00 pm		at Quinnipiac	W 68–55	5–3 (1–0)	TD Bank Sports Center; Hamden, CT
December 3, 2011; 3:30 pm		at Central Connecticut	L 80–82 ^{OT}	5–4 (1–1)	Detrick Gym; New Britain, CT
December 5, 2011*; 7:00 pm		Yale	L 71–73	5–5	William H. Pitt Center; Fairfield, CT
December 9, 2011*; 7:00 pm		at Holy Cross	L 60–71	5–6	Hart Center; Worcester, MA
December 11, 2011*; 3:00 pm		Lafayette	W 84–79	6–6	William H. Pitt Center; Fairfield, CT
December 19, 2011*; 7:00 pm		at Notre Dame	L 65–106	6–7	Edmund P. Joyce Center; South Bend, IN
December 21, 2011*; 7:00 pm		at Boston College	L 73–83	6–8	Conte Forum; Chestnut Hill, MA
December 29, 2011*; 7:30 pm		at New Hampshire	W 77–59	7–8	Lundholm Gym; Durham, NH
January 5, 2012; 7:00 pm		Long Island	L 81–87	7–9 (1–2)	William H. Pitt Center; Fairfield, CT
January 7, 2012; 3:00 pm		St. Francis (NY)	L 84–99	7–10 (1–3)	William H. Pitt Center; Fairfield, CT
January 12, 2012; 7:00 pm		at Saint Francis (PA)	W 71–68	8–10 (2–3)	DeGol Arena; Loretto, PA
January 14, 2012; 4:30 pm		Robert Morris	L 67–70	8–11 (2–4)	Charles L. Sewall Center; Moon Township, PA
January 19, 2012; 3:00 pm		Quinnipiac	W 78–75	9–11 (3–4)	William H. Pitt Center; Fairfield, CT
January 21, 2012; 3:00 pm		Central Connecticut; Pack the Pitt	W 62–61	10–11 (4–4)	William H. Pitt Center; Fairfield, CT
January 26, 2012; 7:00 pm		Wagner	L 54–73	10–12 (4–5)	William H. Pitt Center; Fairfield, CT
January 28, 2012; 3:00 pm		Mount St. Mary's	L 80–81 ^{2OT}	10–13 (4–6)	William H. Pitt Center; Fairfield, CT
February 2, 2012; 7:00 pm		Monmouth	L 56–63	10–14 (4–7)	Multipurpose Activity Center; West Long Branch, NJ
February 4, 2012; 4:30 pm		Fairleigh Dickinson	W 66–57	11–14 (5–7)	Rothman Center; Hackensack, NJ
February 8, 2012; 7:00 pm		Richmond; New England Knockout: Part I	W 79–77	12–14 (6–7)	William H. Pitt Center; Fairfield, CT
February 12, 2012; 4:30 pm		at Bryant; New England Knockout: Part II	W 72–46	13–14 (7–7)	Chace Athletic Center; Smithfield, RI
February 16, 2012; 7:00 pm		at Long Island	L 91–103 ^{OT}	13–15 (7–8)	Athletic, Recreation & Wellness Center; Brooklyn, NY
February 18, 2012; 7:30 pm, MSG		at St. Francis (NY)	L 56–58	13–16 (7–9)	Generoso Pope Athletic Complex; Brooklyn, NY
February 23, 2012; 7:00 pm		Robert Morris	L 53–55	13–17 (7–10)	William H. Pitt Center; Fairfield, CT
February 25, 2012; 12:00 pm, MSG Plus		Saint Francis (PA); Sacred Heart Senior Day	W 72–57	14–17 (8–10)	William H. Pitt Center; Fairfield, CT
NEC tournament
03/01/2012; 7:00 pm	(8)	at Long Island	L 68–80	14–18	Athletic, Recreation, and Wellness Center; Brooklyn, NY
*Non-conference game. ^{#}Rankings from AP Poll. (#) Tournament seedings in parentheses. All times are in Eastern Time.
