= 2011–12 St. Francis Terriers men's basketball team =

American college basketball season

2011–12 St. Francis Terriers men's basketball
- Conference: Northeast Conference
- Record: 15–15 (12–6 NEC)
- Head coach: Glenn Braica (2nd season)
- Assistant coaches: Andy Johnston (4th season); Clive Bentick (5th season); Daniel Nigro (2nd season)
- Home arena: Generoso Pope Athletic Complex

2011–12 Northeast Conference men's basketball standings
	Conf.				Overall
Team	W		L	PCT	W		L	PCT
Long Island †	16	–	2	.889	25	–	9	.735
Wagner	15	–	3	.833	25	–	6	.806
Robert Morris	13	–	5	.722	26	–	10	.722
St. Francis (NY)	12	–	6	.667	15	–	15	.500
Quinnipiac	10	–	8	.556	18	–	14	.563
Monmouth	10	–	8	.556	12	–	20	.375
Central Connecticut	10	–	8	.556	13	–	16	.448
Sacred Heart	8	–	10	.444	14	–	18	.438
Mount St. Mary's	6	–	12	.333	8	–	21	.276
Saint Francis (PA)	5	–	13	.278	6	–	23	.207
Fairleigh Dickinson	2	–	16	.111	3	–	26	.103
*Bryant	1	–	17	.056	2	–	28	.067
† 2012 Northeast Conference tournament winner As of March 17, 2012; Rankings from AP Poll; *Ineligible for conference tournament

The 2011–2012 St. Francis Terriers men's basketball team represented St. Francis College during the 2011–12 NCAA Division I men's basketball season. The team is coached by Glenn Braica, who is in his second year at the helm of the St. Francis Terriers. The Terrier's home games are played at the Generoso Pope Athletic Complex. The team has been a member of the Northeast Conference since 1981. They finished the season at 15–15 overall and 12–6 in NEC play to finish in fourth place. The Terriers went on to lose in the quarterfinals of the Northeast Conference Basketball tournament to Quinnipiac.

Braica was awarded the NEC Jim Phelan coach of the year award and freshman forward Jalen Cannon was selected to the NEC All-Rookie team. Ben Mockford led the Terriers in scoring with 11.8 points per game, Jalen Cannon led the team in rebounding with 8.8 per game and Brent Jones paced the team with 3.9 assists per game.

== Season outlook ==
Going into Glenn Braica's second year as head coach, the Terriers were looking to build on the previous years success and get beyond the NEC quarter-finals. Although, the Terriers lost several key pieces to their team via graduation, including St. Francis College all-time leading scorer, Ricky Cadell, and Akeem Bennett. These losses led in part to their NEC coaches preseason poll selection to finish 11th.

== Recruiting ==
6' 6" power forward Lowell Ulmer, 6' 5” guard Kevin Douglas and 6' 6” power forward Jalen Cannon were signed in the spring.

== Regular season ==
The Terriers had a difficult schedule with their first 9 games on the road. To begin the year, the Terriers lost 3 close games to Seton Hall, Lafayette and Hofstra. In the season opener the Terriers were leading 62–60 with 0:09 left, yet they gave up the lead and lost in overtime 71–75. Against Lafayette, the Terriers were tied 69–69 with just 1:33 left, but were unable to pull out the victory. Versus Hofstra, the game was tied 9 times and there were 12 lead changes as the game went down to the wire. In the fourth contest of the season the Terriers were soundly defeated by the Red Storm. Against NJIT, the Terriers picked up their first win of the season behind a 22-point performance by Ben Mockford. Then in their first conference game, the Terriers rode Mockford's 19 points to beat the Mountaineers and win their second game of the season. After their 2-game winning streak, the Terriers lost to the surging Wagner Seahawks, which went on to defeat 13th ranked Pittsburgh. The Terriers next faced Colgate, a team that has never beaten them before (4–0), and loss a close contest 63–65. Then, after being on the losing end of buzzer-beaters and last minute runs, the Terriers pulled out a win in the final minute of the game at Howard.

The Terriers then began a 3-game homestand at the Pope, where they lost their first 2 to Albany and Norfolk State. In their final game of the homestand the Terriers won their first home game against Brown. The Terriers then went on the road against Army where they faltered ending the non-conference portion of the schedule and finishing 3–7 against non-conference opponents. The Terriers then got hot and won 9 out of their next 10 games against conference opponents. Their only loss was to Wagner, which swept the season series, 0–2. Heading into Rivalry Week the Terriers were set to play 2 matches against LIU and at stake was 1st place in the NEC. Yet the Terriers were swept, losing both games, including the Battle of Brooklyn ending their hopes of a regular season championship. The Terriers then bounced back and beat Quinnipiac on the road, taking the season series 2–0 and clinching a NEC Tournament spot with 3 games left to play. They then went on to go 1–2 beating Sacred Heart and losing to Monmouth and Farleigh Dickinson; both loses came on the road. One high note came in the last game of the regular season, when freshman Jalen Cannon grabbed 20 rebounds against Farleigh Dickinson, which was the most by a Division I freshman in the entire country last season.

The Terriers were able to get the 4th seed going into the NEC tournament. They will host their first home playoff game since 1997. Additionally, coach Glenn Braica won the NEC Jim Phelan coach of the year award and Jalen Cannon was selected to the NEC All-Rookie team.

== NEC tournament ==
The Terriers clinched the 4th seed in the Northeast Conference tournament and faced 5th seed Quinnipiac at home. The Terriers made a quick exit from the tournament losing to Quinnipiac 72–80 in the first round of play.

== Roster ==
2011–12 St. Francis Terriers men's basketball team
Players
Coaches

Pos.	#	Name	Height	Weight	Year	Hometown
G	32	Dre Calloway (injured)	6 ft 0 in (1.83 m)	170 lb (77 kg)	RS Sr	Harlem, New York
G/F	2	Stefan Perunicic	6 ft 6 in (1.98 m)	195 lb (88 kg)	Sr	Belgrade, Serbia
G	15	Justin Newton	6 ft 0 in (1.83 m)	190 lb (86 kg)	Sr	Queens, New York
F	14	Travis Nichols	6 ft 4 in (1.93 m)	190 lb (86 kg)	Jr	Brooklyn, New York
F	30	Akeem Johnson	6 ft 6 in (1.98 m)	200 lb (91 kg)	Jr	Brooklyn, New York
G	11	Phillip Santavenere	6 ft 2 in (1.88 m)	175 lb (79 kg)	So	Middletown, Connecticut
F	12	Milos Trivic	6 ft 8 in (2.03 m)	210 lb (95 kg)	So	Belgrade, Serbia
C	33	Matt Milk	6 ft 8 in (2.03 m)	220 lb (100 kg)	So	Wantagh, New York
G	3	Ben Mockford	6 ft 2 in (1.88 m)	175 lb (79 kg)	So	Shoreham-by-Sea, England
G/F	34	Kevin Douglas	6 ft 5 in (1.96 m)	210 lb (95 kg)	Fr	Bronx, New York
G	1	Brent Jones	5 ft 10 in (1.78 m)	170 lb (77 kg)	Fr	Bronx, New York
F	5	Jalen Cannon	6 ft 6 in (1.98 m)	230 lb (104 kg)	Fr	Allentown, Pennsylvania
F	23	Lowell Ulmer	6 ft 6 in (1.98 m)	210 lb (95 kg)	Fr	Staten Island, New York
G	25	Mike Nierva	5 ft 11 in (1.8 m)	175 lb (79 kg)	Fr	Staten Island, New York

Head coach

- Glenn Braica (Queens College)

Assistant coach(es)

- Andy Johnston (New Hampshire)
- Daniel Nigro (St. Francis)
- Clive Bentick (Canisius)

Legend

- (C) Team captain
- (S) Suspended
- (I) Ineligible
- (W) Walk-on
- Injured
- Current redshirt

Roster
Last update: January 21, 2012

== Schedule and results ==
Date time, TV	Rank^{#}	Opponent^{#}	Result	Record	High points	High rebounds	High assists	Site (attendance) city, state
Regular Season
November 12, 2011*; 7:00 pm, SNY		at Seton Hall	L 71–75 ^{OT}	0–1	25 – Nichols	14 – Nichols	6 – Calloway	Prudential Center (6,988); Newark, NJ
November 16, 2011*; 7:00 pm		at Lafayette	L 74–79	0–2	15 – Nichols	9 – Cannon	2 – Jones	Kirby Sports Center (1,924); Easton, PA
November 19, 2011*; 4:00 pm		at Hofstra	L 59–63	0–3	12 – Nichols	7 – Johnson, Mockford	4 – Jones, Calloway	Hofstra Arena (2,133); Hempstead, NY
November 22, 2011*; 9:00 pm, ESPN3		at St. John's	L 48–63	0–4	13 – Perunicic	7 – Cannon	4 – Calloway	Carnesecca Arena (3,922); Queens, NY
November 26, 2011*; 2:00 pm		at NJIT	W 79–60	1–4	22 – Mockford	8 – Cannon	5 – Jones	Fleisher Center (290); Newark, NJ
December 1, 2011; 7:00 pm		at Mount St. Mary's	W 64–54	2–4 (1–0)	19 – Mockford	9 – Cannon	8 – Newton	Knott Arena (789); Emmitsburg, MD
December 3, 2011; 7:00 pm		at Wagner	L 50–90	2–5 (1–1)	9 – Jones, Mockford	8 – Douglas	2 – Jones	Spiro Sports Center (1,889); Staten Island, NY
December 10, 2011*; 2:00 pm		at Colgatte	L 63–65	2–6	18 – Johnson	8 – Cannon	6 – Jones	Cotterell Court (576); Hamilton, NY
December 12, 2011*; 7:00 pm		at Howard	W 73–71	3–6	24 – Mockford	10 – Cannon	7 – Jones	Burr Gymnasium (349); Washington, DC
December 19, 2011*; 7:00 pm		Albany; Homecoming	L 64–76	3–7	23 – Nichols	8 – Johnson	8 – Newton	Generoso Pope Athletic Complex (935); Brooklyn, NY
December 23, 2011*; 2:00 pm		Norfolk State	L 74–84	3–8	21 – Perunicic	7 – Nichols	7 – Newton	Generoso Pope Athletic Complex (763); Brooklyn, NY
December 29, 2011*; 7:00 pm		Brown	W 66–49	4–8	14 – Perunicic	9 – Cannon	6 – Newton	Generoso Pope Athletic Complex (743); Brooklyn, NY
December 31, 2011*; 2:00 pm		Army	L 70–79	4–9	17 – Mockford, Perunicic	13 – Cannon	3 – Newton	Christl Arena (843); West Point, NY
January 5, 2012; 7:00 pm		Quinnipiac	W 73–72	5–9 (2–1)	21 – Perunicic	8 – Newton	6 – Newton	Generoso Pope Athletic Complex (732); Brooklyn, NY
January 7, 2012; 4:00 pm		at Sacred Heart	W 99–84	6–9 (3–1)	28 – Mockford	5 – Jones	7 – Jones	William H. Pitt Center (451); Fairfield, CT
January 12, 2012; 7:00 pm		at Monmouth	W 81–64	7–9 (4–1)	14 – Perunicic, Jones	12 – Cannon	9 – Newton	Generoso Pope Athletic Complex (687); Brooklyn, NY
January 14, 2012; 4:00 pm		at Fairleigh Dickinson	W 62–51	8–9 (5–1)	15 – Jones	12 – Cannon	3 – Jones, Mockford	Generoso Pope Athletic Complex (549); Brooklyn, NY
January 19, 2012; 7:00 pm		at Wagner	L 61–73	8–10 (5–2)	16 – Perunicic	9 – Cannon	6 – Jones	Generoso Pope Athletic Complex (978); Brooklyn, NY
January 21, 2012; 4:00 pm		at Mount St. Mary's	W 79–60	9–10 (6–2)	21 – Perunicic	11 – Cannon	6 – Jones	Generoso Pope Athletic Complex (567); Brooklyn, NY
January 26, 2012; 7:00 pm		at Saint Francis (PA)	W 75–65	10–10 (7–2)	22 – Johnson	9 – Newton	8 – Newton	DeGol Arena (912); Loretto, PA
January 28, 2012; 7:00 pm		at Robert Morris	W 81–68	11–10 (8–2)	19 – Jones	11 – Cannon	4 – Jones, Newton	Charles L. Sewall Center (1,378); Moon Township, PA
February 2, 2012; 7:00 pm		at Central Connecticut	W 73–67	12–10 (9–2)	16 – Nichols, Johnson	10 – Cannon	6 – Jones	Generoso Pope Athletic Complex (647); Brooklyn, NY
February 4, 2012; 4:00 pm		at Bryant	W 80–67	13–10 (10–2)	21 – Mockford	10 – Cannon	6 – Jones	Generoso Pope Athletic Complex (726); Brooklyn, NY
February 8, 2012; 9:00 pm		vs. Long Island	L 75–86	13–11 (10–3)	24 – Johnson	8 – Johnson	6 – Jones	Madison Square Garden (7,618); New York, NY
February 12, 2012; 4:00 pm, MSG		at Long Island; Battle of Brooklyn	L 78–81	13–12 (10–4)	23 – Johnson	9 – Johnson	6 – Newton	Athletic, Recreation & Wellness Center (1,472); Brooklyn, NY
February 16, 2012; 7:00 pm		at Quinnipiac	W 64–56	14–12 (11–4)	13 – Cannon	19 – Cannon	5 – Jones	TD Bank Sports Center (1,996); Hamden, CT
February 18, 2012; 4:00 pm, MSG		at Sacred Heart	W 58–56	15–12 (12–4)	16 – Johnson	10 – Cannon	6 – Jones	Generoso Pope Athletic Complex (935); Brooklyn, NY
February 23, 2012; 7:00 pm		at Monmouth	L 73–79	15–13 (12–5)	16 – Mockford	14 – Cannon	5 – Jones	Multipurpose Activity Center (1,505); West Long Branch, NJ
February 25, 2012; 4:00 pm		at Fairleigh Dickinson	L 44–45	15–14 (12–6)	14 – Douglas	20 – Cannon	3 – Jones	Rothman Center (1,433); Teaneck, NJ
NEC tournament
March 1, 2012; 7:00 pm	(4)	(5) Quinnipiac; Quarterfinals	L 72–80	15–15	21 – Jones	11 – Cannon	5 – Jones	Generoso Pope Athletic Complex (875); Brooklyn, NY
*Non-conference game. ^{#}Rankings from AP Poll. (#) Tournament seedings in parentheses. All times are in Eastern Time.

== Season Statistics ==
Individual Player Statistics (As of March 12, 2012)
			Minutes		Scoring		Total FGs			3-point FGs			Free-Throws			Rebounds							
Player	GP	GS	Tot	Avg	Pts	Avg	FG	FGA	Pct	3FG	3FA	Pct	FT	FTA	Pct	Off	Def	Tot	Avg	A	TO	Blk	Stl
Cannon, Jalen	30	18	736	24.5	240	8	85	153	.556	0	0	.000	70	118	.593	104	161	265	8.8	22	24	16	17
Johnson, Akeem	28	27	669	23.9	317	11.3	117	204	.574	0	0	.000	83	119	.697	55	88	143	5.1	26	58	28	20
Mockford, Ben	30	30	921	30.7	354	11.8	119	336	.354	83	240	.346	33	46	.717	3	49	52	1.7	36	48	2	16
Douglas, Kevin	30	2	323	10.8	87	2.9	31	81	.383	7	31	.226	18	27	.667	11	54	65	2.2	11	20	3	15
Jones, Brent	30	12	667	22.2	237	7.9	80	228	.351	15	53	.283	62	86	.721	16	68	84	2.8	118	100	2	42
Nichols, Travis	28	14	561	20.0	261	9.3	91	207	.440	46	113	.407	33	41	.805	39	78	117	4.2	7	37	3	15
Calloway, Dre	5	5	120	24	42	8.4	15	39	.385	0	3	.000	12	25	.480	2	9	11	2.2	17	18	1	4
Santavenere, P. J.	24	0	242	10.1	85	3.5	31	72	.431	12	42	.286	11	14	.786	9	8	17	0.7	11	13	0	11
Perunicic, Stefan	29	28	851	29.3	336	11.6	109	257	.424	73	172	.424	45	66	0.682	8	62	70	2.4	36	68	6	25
Trivic, Milos	14	0	40	2.9	5	0.4	2	5	.400	0	1	.000	1	6	.167	3	2	5	0.4	2	2	0	3
Newton, Justin	30	13	558	18.6	49	1.6	16	43	.372	3	16	.188	14	26	.538	10	65	75	2.5	101	69	5	31
Milk, Matt	30	1	289	9.6	60	2.0	26	49	.531	0	0	.000	8	13	.615	20	27	47	1.6	4	15	6	6
Ulmer, Lowell	15	0	48	3.2	11	0.7	5	11	.455	0	1	.000	1	3	.333	5	6	11	0.7	1	3	1	0
Team																28	28	56			3		
Total	30		6025		2084	69.5	727	1685	0.431	239	672	0.356	391	590	0.663	344	741	1085	36.2	392	486	73	205
Opponents	30		6024		2062	68.7	711	1621	0.439	138	456	0.303	502	746	0.673	308	711	1019	34.0	338	448	81	203

Legend
GP	Games played	GS	Games started	Avg	Average per game
FG	Field-goals made	FGA	Field-goal attempts	Off	Offensive rebounds
Def	Defensive rebounds	A	Assists	TO	Turnovers
Blk	Blocks	Stl	Steals	High	Team high

== Signings ==
The Terriers announced that 6' 3” combo guard Anthony White (Mastic, NY) and 6' 4” shooting guard Aleksandar Isailovic (Belgrade/Serbia) have signed National Letters-of-Intent to enroll at the college fall 2012.
