= 2011–12 Quinnipiac Bobcats men's basketball team =

American college basketball season

2011–12 Quinnipiac Bobcats men's basketball
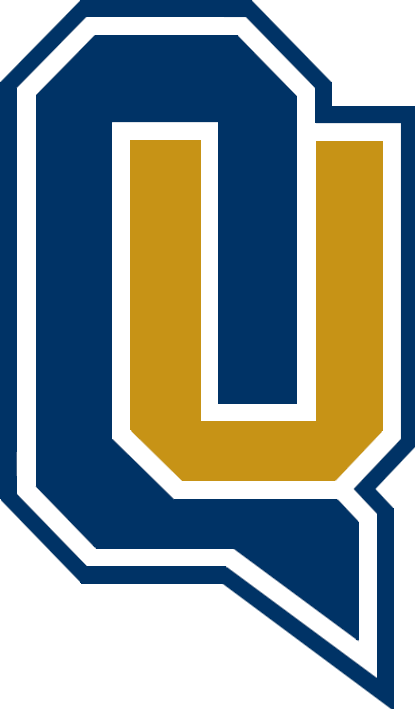

CBI, First round
- Conference: Northeast Conference
- Record: 18–14 (10–8 NEC)
- Head coach: Tom Moore (5th season)
- Assistant coaches: Sean Doherty; Eric Eaton; Scott Burrell
- Home arena: TD Bank Sports Center

2011–12 Northeast Conference men's basketball standings
	Conf.				Overall
Team	W		L	PCT	W		L	PCT
Long Island †	16	–	2	.889	25	–	9	.735
Wagner	15	–	3	.833	25	–	6	.806
Robert Morris	13	–	5	.722	26	–	10	.722
St. Francis (NY)	12	–	6	.667	15	–	15	.500
Quinnipiac	10	–	8	.556	18	–	14	.563
Monmouth	10	–	8	.556	12	–	20	.375
Central Connecticut	10	–	8	.556	13	–	16	.448
Sacred Heart	8	–	10	.444	14	–	18	.438
Mount St. Mary's	6	–	12	.333	8	–	21	.276
Saint Francis (PA)	5	–	13	.278	6	–	23	.207
Fairleigh Dickinson	2	–	16	.111	3	–	26	.103
*Bryant	1	–	17	.056	2	–	28	.067
† 2012 Northeast Conference tournament winner As of March 17, 2012; Rankings from AP Poll; *Ineligible for conference tournament

The 2011–12 Quinnipiac Bobcats men's basketball team represented Quinnipiac University in the 2011–12 NCAA Division I men's basketball season. The Bobcats, led by head coach Tom Moore, played their home games at TD Bank Sports Center in Hamden, Connecticut, as members of the Northeast Conference. Quinnipiac finished 5th during the regular season, and advanced to the 2nd round of the NEC tournament, where they were defeated by Long Island.

Quinnipiac failed to qualify for the NCAA tournament, but received a bid to the 2012 College Basketball Invitational. The Bobcats were eliminated in the first round of the CBI by Penn, 74–63.

== Roster ==
2011–12 Quinnipiac Bobcats men's basketball team
Players
Coaches

Pos.	#	Name	Height	Weight	Year	Hometown
G	1	Zaid Hearst	6 ft 4 in (1.93 m)	190 lb (86 kg)	Fr	Bethesda, Maryland
G	2	Dave Johnson	5 ft 10 in (1.78 m)	150 lb (68 kg)	Jr	Jackson, New Jersey
G	3	James Johnson	6 ft 0 in (1.83 m)	195 lb (88 kg)	Sr	Queens, New York
F	4	Ike Azotam	6 ft 7 in (2.01 m)	231 lb (105 kg)	So	Boston, Massachusetts
G	5	Nate Gause	6 ft 3 in (1.91 m)	180 lb (82 kg)	Fr	Poughkeepsie, New York
G	10	Garvey Young	6 ft 5 in (1.96 m)	196 lb (89 kg)	Jr	Washington, D.C.
F	12	Marquis Barnett	6 ft 8 in (2.03 m)	243 lb (110 kg)	Fr	The Bronx, New York
F	15	Alex Jackson	6 ft 5 in (1.96 m)	215 lb (98 kg)	So	Baltimore, Maryland
G	21	Evan Conti	6 ft 3 in (1.91 m)	200 lb (91 kg)	Fr	Bayside, New York
F	22	Justin Harris	6 ft 8 in (2.03 m)	250 lb (113 kg)	Fr	Paterson, New Jersey
F	23	Ousmane Drame	6 ft 9 in (2.06 m)	240 lb (109 kg)	Fr	Boston, Massachusetts
G	24	Terrance Bobb–Jones	6 ft 4 in (1.93 m)	195 lb (88 kg)	Fr	Wilmington, Delaware
G	25	T'Ziah Wood–Smith	6 ft 4 in (1.93 m)	190 lb (86 kg)	Fr	Baldwin, New York
G	33	Kevin Tarca	5 ft 10 in (1.78 m)	165 lb (75 kg)	Sr	Skillman, New Jersey
F	35	Jamee Jackson	6 ft 7 in (2.01 m)	225 lb (102 kg)	Jr	Newark, New Jersey

Head coach

- Tom Moore (Boston University)

Assistant coach(es)

- Sean Doherty (Worcester State)
- Eric Eaton (UMass Dartmouth)
- Scott Burrell (Connecticut)

Legend

- (C) Team captain
- (S) Suspended
- (I) Ineligible
- (W) Walk-on
- Injured
- Current redshirt

Roster
Last update: January 13, 2023

== Schedule and results ==
Date time, TV	Rank^{#}	Opponent^{#}	Result	Record	Site city, state
Regular season
November 11, 2011*; 5:30 pm, CPTV		vs. Fairfield; Connecticut 6 Classic	L 60–72	0–1	Mohegan Sun Arena; Uncasville, CT
November 15, 2011*; 7:00 pm, SNY		Yale	W 68–62	1–1	TD Bank Sports Center (2,744); Hamden, CT
November 19, 2011*; 2:00 pm		Navy	W 78–54	2–1	TD Bank Sports Center (1,690); Hamden, CT
November 22, 2011*; 7:30 pm		at American	L 73–74	2–2	Bender Arena (717); Washington, D.C.
November 28, 2011*; 7:00 pm		at Lehigh	L 75–86	2–3	Stabler Arena (853); Bethlehem, PA
December 1, 2011; 7:00 pm		Sacred Heart	L 55–68	2–4 (0–1)	TD Bank Sports Center (1,311); Hamden, CT
December 3, 2011; 3:00 pm		Bryant	W 64–48	3–4 (1–1)	TD Bank Sports Center (1,280); Hamden, CT
December 6, 2011*; 7:00 pm		at Hartford	W 70–61	4–4	Chase Arena at Reich Family Pavilion (961); West Hartford, CT
December 11, 2011*; 1:00 pm		at Vermont	W 62–58	5–4	Patrick Gym (2,251); Burlington, VT
December 17, 2011*; 1:00 pm, NESN		at UMass	L 67–72	5–5	Mullins Center (2,890); Amherst, MA
December 22, 2011*; 7:00 pm		Niagara	W 85–81	6–5	TD Bank Sports Center (1,713); Hamden, CT
December 28, 2021*; 7:00 pm		at Colgate	W 80–70	7–5	Cotterell Court (398); Hamilton, NY
December 31, 2011*; 12:00 pm, SNY / NESN		Boston University	W 59–53	8–5	TD Bank Sports Center (2,217); Hamden, CT
January 5, 2012; 7:00 pm		at St. Francis Brooklyn	L 72–73	8–6 (1–2)	Generoso Pope Athletic Complex (732); Brooklyn Heights, NY
January 7, 2012; 2:00 pm		Long Island	L 75–79	8–7 (1–3)	TD Bank Sports Center (2,089); Hamden, CT
January 12, 2012; 7:00 pm		at Robert Morris	W 78–76	9–7 (2–3)	Charles L. Sewall Center (1,231); Moon Township, PA
January 14, 2012; 7:00 pm		at Saint Francis (PA)	L 71–74	9–8 (2–4)	DeGol Arena (922); Loretto, PA
January 19, 2012; 7:00 pm		at Sacred Heart	L 75–78	9–9 (2–5)	William H. Pitt Center (1,104); Fairfield, CT
January 21, 2012; 4:00 pm		at Bryant	W 78–71 ^{OT}	10–9 (3–5)	Chace Athletic Center (486); Smithfield, RI
January 26, 2012; 7:00 pm		Mount St. Mary's	W 69–66 ^{OT}	11–9 (4–5)	TD Bank Sports Center (1,021); Hamden, CT
January 28, 2012; 2:00 pm		Wagner	L 50–51	11–10 (4–6)	TD Bank Sports Center (1,289); Hamden, CT
February 2, 2012; 7:00 pm		at Fairleigh Dickinson	W 65–48	12–10 (5–6)	Rothman Center (892); Hackensack, NJ
February 4, 2012; 2:00 pm		at Monmouth	W 71–48	13–10 (6–6)	OceanFirst Bank Center (2,580); West Long Branch, NJ
February 8, 2012; 7:00 pm		Central Connecticut	W 72–44	14–10 (7–6)	TD Bank Sports Center (2,048); Hamden, CT
February 12, 2012; 12:00 pm, MSG		at Central Connecticut	W 67–59	15–10 (8–6)	William H. Detrick Gymnasium (2,557); New Britain, CT
February 16, 2012; 7:00 pm		St. Francis Brooklyn	L 56–64	15–11 (8–7)	TD Bank Sports Center (1,996); Hamden, CT
February 18, 2012; 4:30 pm		at Long Island	L 89–99	15–12 (8–8)	Athletic, Recreation & Wellness Center (1,172); Brooklyn, NY
February 23, 2012; 7:00 pm		Saint Francis (PA)	W 77–44	16–12 (9–8)	TD Bank Sports Center (1,822); Hamden, CT
February 25, 2012; 11:00 am, ESPNU		Robert Morris	W 73–69	17–12 (10–8)	TD Bank Sports Center (3,163); Hamden, CT
NEC tournament
March 1, 2012; 7:00 pm	(5)	at (4) St. Francis Brooklyn; NEC Quarterfinals	W 80–72	18–12	Generoso Pope Athletic Complex (875); Brooklyn Heights, NY
March 4, 2012; 6:00 pm	(5)	at (1) Long Island; NEC Semifinals	L 75–78	18–13	Athletic, Recreation & Wellness Center (1,327); Brooklyn, NY
CBI
March 14, 2012; 9:00 pm		at Penn; CBI First Round	L 63–74	18–14	Palestra (1,268); Philadelphia, PA
*Non-conference game. ^{#}Rankings from AP Poll. (#) Tournament seedings in parentheses. All times are in Eastern Time.
