= 2010–11 Robert Morris Colonials men's basketball team =

American college basketball season

2010–11 Robert Morris Colonials men's basketball
- Conference: Northeast Conference
- Record: 18–13 (12–6 NEC)
- Head coach: Andrew Toole
- Assistant coaches: Michael Byrnes; Matt Hahn; Robby Pridgen
- Home arena: Charles L. Sewall Center

2010–11 Northeast Conference men's basketball standings
	Conf.				Overall
Team	W		L	PCT	W		L	PCT
† Long Island	16	–	2	.889	27	–	6	.818
Quinnipiac	13	–	5	.722	22	–	10	.688
Robert Morris	12	–	6	.667	18	–	14	.563
Central Connecticut State	11	–	7	.611	19	–	12	.613
St. Francis (NY)	10	–	8	.556	15	–	15	.500
Wagner	9	–	9	.500	13	–	17	.433
Mount St. Mary's	9	–	9	.500	11	–	21	.344
Bryant*	7	–	11	.389	9	–	21	.300
St. Francis (PA)	7	–	11	.389	9	–	21	.300
Sacred Heart	6	–	12	.333	11	–	18	.379
Monmouth	5	–	13	.278	9	–	21	.300
Fairleigh Dickinson	3	–	15	.167	5	–	24	.172
† 2011 Northeast Conference tournament winner As of March 17, 2012; Rankings from AP Poll; *Ineligible for conference tournament

The 2010–11 Robert Morris Colonials men's basketball team represented Robert Morris University in the 2010–2011 NCAA Division I basketball season. Robert Morris was coached by Andrew Toole and played their home games at the Charles L. Sewall Center in Moon Township, PA. They finished with a record of 18–13 and 12–6 in NEC play.

== Coaching staff ==
Name	Position	Year at Robert Morris	Alma Mater (Year)
Andrew Toole	Head coach	4th (1st as Head Coach)	Penn (2003)
Michael Byrnes	Assistant coach	1st	Massachusetts (1990)
Matt Hahn	Assistant coach	1st	Maryland (2000)
Robby Pridgen	Assistant coach	2nd	Roanoke (2003)
Dave Scarborough	Director of Basketball Operations	2nd	California (Pa.) (2009)
David Richards	Video Coordinator	2nd	Westminster (2009)

== Roster ==
Name	#	Position	Height	Weight (lb.)	Year	Hometown	Previous School
Karon Abraham	4	Guard	5 ft 9 in (1.75 m)	150	Sophomore	Paterson, NJ	Paterson Eastside HS
Lawrence Bridges	24	Forward	6 ft 5 in (1.96 m)	220	Junior	Detroit, MI	Columbus State Community College
Yann Charles	25	Forward	6 ft 5 in (1.96 m)	220	Freshman	Longueuil, QC, Canada	Champlain Saint-Albert HS
Russell Johnson	34	Forward	6 ft 6 in (1.98 m)	180	Sophomore (RS)	Chester, PA	Chester HS
Velton Jones	2	Guard	6 ft 0 in (1.83 m)	170	Sophomore (RS)	Philadelphia, PA	Northeast Catholic HS
Treadwell Lewis	10	Guard	5 ft 10 in (1.78 m)	170	Sophomore	Shelton, CT	Christian Heritage School
Anthony Myers	5	Guard	5 ft 11 in (1.80 m)	170	Freshman	Washington, D.C.	Charis Prep
Elton Roy	15	Guard	6 ft 2 in (1.88 m)	195	Freshman	Houston, TX	Yates HS
Lijah Thompson	11	Forward / Center	6 ft 7 in (2.01 m)	200	Sophomore	Philadelphia, PA	Monsignor Bonner HS
Deion Turman	1	Forward / Center	6 ft 8 in (2.03 m)	215	Freshman	Pittsburgh, PA	Mt. Lebanon HS
Gary Wallace	14	Guard	6 ft 3 in (1.91 m)	200	Senior	Montclair, NJ	Seton Hall Preparatory School
Coron Williams	3	Guard	6 ft 2 in (1.88 m)	170	Freshman (RS)	Midlothian, VA	Christchurch School

== Schedule ==
Date time, TV	Rank^{#}	Opponent^{#}	Result	Record	Site (attendance) city, state
Exhibition
Tue, Nov. 2*; 7:30 pm		McGill University	W 77 – 54; Recap		Charles L. Sewall Center (871); Moon Township, PA
Regular season
Sat, Nov. 13*; 4:00 pm		St. Peter's College	W 55 – 30; Recap	1–0	Charles L. Sewall Center (1,078); Moon Township, PA
Tue, Nov. 16*; 8:00 am, ESPN		at Kent State; ESPN College Basketball Tip-Off Marathon	L 59 – 62; Recap	1–1	Memorial Athletic and Convocation Center (1,496); Kent, OH
Fri, Nov. 19*; 7:00 pm		Duquesne	W 69 – 63; Recap	2–1	Charles L. Sewall Center (1,846); Moon Township, PA
Tue, Nov. 23*; 7:00 pm, FSN Pittsburgh		at No. 5 Pittsburgh	L 53 – 74; Recap	2–2	Petersen Events Center (10,121); Pittsburgh, PA
Mon, Nov. 29*; 6:00 pm		at Cleveland State	L 53 – 58; Recap	2–3	Wolstein Center (1,841); Cleveland, OH
Thu, Dec. 2; 7:00 pm		at Long Island	W 70 – 69; Recap	3–3	Athletic, Recreation & Wellness Center (957); Brooklyn, NY
Sat, Dec. 4; 4:30 pm		at St. Francis (N.Y.)	L 63 – 65; Recap	3–4	Pope Physical Education Center (630); Brooklyn Heights, NY
Tue, Dec. 7*; 7:00 pm		at West Virginia	L 49 – 82; Recap	3–5	WVU Coliseum (6,443); Morgantown, WV
Sat, Dec. 11*; 7:00 pm		Youngstown State	W 90 – 60; Recap	4–5	Charles L. Sewall Center (1,242); Moon Township, PA
Sat, Dec. 18*; 7:00 pm		at Appalachian State	L 66 – 71; Recap	4–6	George M. Holmes Convocation Center (1,062); Boone, NC
Wed, Dec. 22*; 8:30 pm		at Arizona	L 56 – 82; Recap	4–7	McKale Center (13,982); Tucson, AZ
Thu, Dec. 30*; 7:00 pm		at Morgan State	L 66 – 67; Recap	4–8	Talmadge L. Hill Field House (872); Baltimore, MD
Sun, Jan. 2*; 2:00 pm		at Ohio	W 79 – 76; Recap ^{OT}	5–8	Convocation Center (3,338); Athens, OH
Thu, Jan. 6; 7:00 pm		at Wagner	L 78 – 83; Recap ^{OT}	5–9	Spiro Sports Center (903); Staten Island, NY
Sat, Jan. 8; 1:00 pm		at Mount St. Mary's	W 51 – 48; Recap	6–9	Knott Arena (1,003); Emmitsburg, MD
Thu, Jan. 13; 7:00 pm		Fairleigh Dickinson	W 83 – 65; Recap	7–9	Charles L. Sewall Center (1,078); Moon Township, PA
Sat, Jan. 15; 7:00 pm		Monmouth	W 60 – 57; Recap	8–9	Charles L. Sewall Center (847); Moon Township, PA
*Non-conference game. ^{#}Rankings from Division I AP Poll unless otherwise noted. ^{^}Division II NABC Coaches' Poll. ^{†}Postseason ranks represent seeds in the applicable tournament. (#) Tournament seedings in parentheses. All times are in Eastern Standard Time.
