= 2010–11 St. Francis Terriers men's basketball team =

American college basketball season

2010–11 St. Francis Terriers men's basketball
- Conference: Northeast Conference
- Record: 15–15 (10–8 NEC)
- Head coach: Glenn Braica (1st season)
- Assistant coaches: Andy Johnston (3rd season); Clive Bentick (4th season); Daniel Nigro (1st season)
- Home arena: Generoso Pope Athletic Complex

2010–11 Northeast Conference men's basketball standings
	Conf.				Overall
Team	W		L	PCT	W		L	PCT
† Long Island	16	–	2	.889	27	–	6	.818
Quinnipiac	13	–	5	.722	22	–	10	.688
Robert Morris	12	–	6	.667	18	–	14	.563
Central Connecticut State	11	–	7	.611	19	–	12	.613
St. Francis (NY)	10	–	8	.556	15	–	15	.500
Wagner	9	–	9	.500	13	–	17	.433
Mount St. Mary's	9	–	9	.500	11	–	21	.344
Bryant*	7	–	11	.389	9	–	21	.300
St. Francis (PA)	7	–	11	.389	9	–	21	.300
Sacred Heart	6	–	12	.333	11	–	18	.379
Monmouth	5	–	13	.278	9	–	21	.300
Fairleigh Dickinson	3	–	15	.167	5	–	24	.172
† 2011 Northeast Conference tournament winner As of March 17, 2012; Rankings from AP Poll; *Ineligible for conference tournament

The 2010–2011 St. Francis Terriers men's basketball team represented St. Francis College during the 2010–11 NCAA Division I men's basketball season. The team was coached by Glenn Braica who was in his first year at the helm of the Terriers. The Terriers' home games were played at Generoso Pope Athletic Complex and the team is a member of the Northeast Conference.

In Glenn Braica's first year as head coach, the Terriers finished 15–15 (10–8 in the NEC). The Terriers made the playoffs as the 5th seed and lost in the quarter-finals to Central Connecticut State University. The Terriers were off to a good start, yet, after the Madison Square Garden Holiday Festival, which included losses to Northwestern University and Davidson College, they seemed to falter. The Terriers hit their low when losing two straight to Long Island University, including the Battle of Brooklyn game at home. After those loses, the Terriers picked themselves up and finished the regular season strong winning their last four games against conference teams.

Under Braica, the Terriers increased their scoring by more than six points per game from the previous season and were one of the best teams in the country in taking care of the basketball, averaging a conference-low 13.3 turnovers per game. The team also led the NEC with 7.80 steals per game.

== Preseason ==
Braica was busy signing his first class, which include: 6' guard Dre Calloway, 6' 4" guard/forward Travis Nichols, 6' guard Adam Chmielewski, 6' 8" power forward Matt Milk, and 6' 2" shooting guard Ben Mockford.

== Schedule and results ==
Date time, TV	Rank^{#}	Opponent^{#}	Result	Record	Site city, state
Regular season
November 12, 2010*; 7:00 pm		at Boston College	L 49–79	0–1	Conte Forum; Chestnut Hill, MA
November 15, 2010*; 7:00 pm		at South Florida	L 71–74	0–2	USF Sun Dome; Tampa, FL
November 21, 2010*; 2:00 pm		Howard	W 70–52	1–2	Generoso Pope Athletic Complex; Brooklyn, NY
November 24, 2010*; 4:00 pm		at Brown	L 63–67	1–3	Pizzitola Sports Center; Providence, RI
December 2, 2010; 7:00 pm		Saint Francis (PA)	W 57–44	2–3 (1–0)	Generoso Pope Athletic Complex; Brooklyn, NY
December 4, 2010; 4:30 pm		Robert Morris	W 65–63	3–3 (2–0)	Generoso Pope Athletic Complex; Brooklyn, NY
December 7, 2010*; 7:00 pm		Colgate	W 68–57	4–3	Generoso Pope Athletic Complex; Brooklyn, NY
December 10, 2010*; 7:00 pm		at Canisius	W 76–58	5–3	Koessler Center; Buffalo, NY
December 14, 2010*		Dartmouth	W 69–61	6–3	Generoso Pope Athletic Complex; Brooklyn, NY
December 20, 2010*; 7:00 pm, MSG		vs. Northwestern; MSG Holiday Festival	L 61–92	6–4	Madison Square Garden; New York, NY
December 21, 2010*; 7:00 pm, MSG		vs. Davidson; MSG Holiday Festival	L 69–76	6–5	Madison Square Garden; New York, NY
December 30, 2010*; 7:00 pm		NJIT	W 72–47	7–5	Pope Physical Education Center; Brooklyn, NY
January 3, 2011*; 7:00 pm		at Hartford	L 74–82	7–6	Chase Arena at Reich Family Pavilion; West Hartford, CT
January 6, 2011; 7:00 pm		at Central Connecticut	L 43–61	7–7 (2–1)	William H. Detrick Gymnasium; New Britain, CT
January 8, 2011; 4:00 pm		at Bryant	L 64–67	7–8 (2–2)	Chace Athletic Center; Smithfield, RI
January 13, 2011; 7:00 pm		Wagner	W 72–56	8–8 (3–2)	Pope Physical Education Center; Brooklyn, NY
January 15, 2011; 4:30 pm		Mount St. Mary's	L 61–70	8–9 (3–3)	Generoso Pope Athletic Complex; Brooklyn, NY
January 20, 2011; 7:00 pm		at Saint Francis (PA)	L 56–75	8–10 (3–4)	DeGol Arena; Loretto, PA
January 22, 2011; 7:00 pm		at Robert Morris	L 51–54	8–11 (3–5)	Charles L. Sewall Center; Moon Township, PA
January 27, 2011; 7:45 pm		at Monmouth	W 62–61	9–11 (4–5)	Multipurpose Activity Center; West Long Branch, NJ
January 29, 2011; 7:00 pm		at Fairleigh Dickinson	W 86–77	10–11 (5–5)	Rothman Center; Teaneck, NJ
February 3, 2011; 7:00 pm		Quinnipiac	L 60–74	10–12 (5–6)	Generoso Pope Athletic Complex; Brooklyn, NY
February 5, 2011; 4:30 pm		Sacred Heart	W 78–51	11–12 (6–6)	Generoso Pope Athletic Complex; Brooklyn, NY
February 8, 2011; 7:00 pm		at Long Island	L 76–87	11–13 (6–7)	Athletic, Recreation & Wellness Center; Brooklyn, NY
February 11, 2011; 12:00 pm, MSG		Long Island; Battle of Brooklyn	L 80–82	11–14 (6–8)	Generoso Pope Athletic Complex; Brooklyn, NY
February 17, 2011; 7:00 pm		at Mount St. Mary's	W 63–60	12–14 (7–8)	Knott Arena; Emmitsburg, MD
February 19, 2011; 12:00 pm, MSG		at Wagner	W 77–73	13–14 (8–8)	Spiro Sports Center; Staten Island, NY
February 24, 2011; 7:00 pm		Central Connecticut	W 75–65	14–14 (9–8)	Generoso Pope Athletic Complex; Brooklyn, NY
February 26, 2011; 4:30 pm		Bryant	W 72–61	15–14 (10–8)	Generoso Pope Athletic Complex; Brooklyn, NY
NEC tournament
March 2, 2011; 6:45 pm	(5)	at (4) Central Connecticut; NEC Quarterfinals	L 62–64	15–15	William H. Detrick Gymnasium; New Britain, CT
*Non-conference game. ^{#}Rankings from AP Poll. (#) Tournament seedings in parentheses.

== Roster ==
2010–11 St. Francis Terriers men's basketball team
Players
Coaches

Pos.	#	Name	Height	Weight	Year	Hometown
F	11	Ricky Cadell	6 ft 2 in (1.88 m)	180 lb (82 kg)	Sr	Manhattan, New York
F/C	40	Alexander Harrington	6 ft 9 in (2.06 m)	220 lb (100 kg)	Sr	Lanham, Maryland
G/F	24	Akeem Bennett	6 ft 3 in (1.91 m)	180 lb (82 kg)	Sr	Long Island, New York
G	1	Dre Calloway	6 ft 0 in (1.83 m)	170 lb (77 kg)	Jr	Harlem, New York
G/F	2	Stefan Perunicic	6 ft 6 in (1.98 m)	195 lb (88 kg)	Jr	Belgrade, Serbia
G	15	Justin Newton	6 ft 0 in (1.83 m)	190 lb (86 kg)	Jr	Queens, New York
C	20	Richard Clark	6 ft 9 in (2.06 m)	215 lb (98 kg)	Jr	Berkshire, England
F	30	Akeem Johnson	6 ft 6 in (1.98 m)	200 lb (91 kg)	So	Brooklyn, New York
G	3	Ben Mockford (redshirt)	6 ft 2 in (1.88 m)	175 lb (79 kg)	So	Shoreham-by-Sea, England
F	14	Travis Nichols	6 ft 4 in (1.93 m)	190 lb (86 kg)	So	Brooklyn, New York
G	5	Adam Chmielewski	6 ft 0 in (1.83 m)	175 lb (79 kg)	Fr	Montreal, Canada
F	12	Milos Trivic	6 ft 8 in (2.03 m)	210 lb (95 kg)	Fr	Belgrade, Serbia
C	33	Matt Milk	6 ft 8 in (2.03 m)	220 lb (100 kg)	Fr	Wantagh, New York

Head coach

- Glenn Braica (Queens College)

Assistant coach(es)

- Andy Johnston (New Hampshire)
- Daniel Nigro (St. Francis)
- Clive Bentick (Canisius)

Legend

- (C) Team captain
- (S) Suspended
- (I) Ineligible
- (W) Walk-on
- Injured
- Current redshirt

Roster
Last update: April 1, 2011

== Notes ==
Akeem Bennett and Ricky Cadell were named to the Second Team All-Conference Squad. In addition, Bennett was named the Northeast Conference Defensive Player of the Year. For Cadell, in the last game of the regular season he became St. Francis College's all-time leading scorer. With 1,624 points he eclipsed Darwin Purdie’s school record that had stood for over 20 years and now ranks 35th on the NEC career scoring list.
