= Julian Boyd (basketball) =

American basketball player

Personal information
- Born: February 2, 1990 (age 36) San Antonio, Texas. U.S.
- Listed height: 201 cm (6 ft 7 in)
- Listed weight: 104 kg (229 lb)

Career information
- High school: William Howard Taft (San Antonio, Texas)
- College: LIU Brooklyn (2008–2012)
- NBA draft: 2014: undrafted
- Playing career: 2015–2026
- Position: Small forward

Career history
- 2015–2016: Porvoon Tarmo
- 2016–2018: London Lightning
- 2018–2019: KR
- 2019–2020: Macau Wolf Warriors
- 2020–2021: Ironi Kiryat Ata
- 2021: Hapoel Jerusalem
- 2021–2022: Formosa Taishin Dreamers
- 2022–2023: Changhua BLL
- 2023–2024: Formosa Dreamers
- 2024–2025: Taoyuan Pauian Pilots
- 2025–2026: Formosa Dreamers

Career highlights
- P. League+ champion (2025); Icelandic champion (2019); Úrvalsdeild Playoffs MVP (2019); Úrvalsdeild Foreign Player of the Year (2019); NEC Player of the Year (2012); AP Honorable mention All-American (2012); 2× First-team All-NEC (2011, 2012); NEC Rookie of the Year (2008)

Julian Anthoney Boyd (born February 2, 1990) is an American former professional basketball player. Boyd played college basketball at Long Island University where he was an All-American. In 2019 he won the Icelandic championship with KR and was also named the Playoffs MVP and the Foreign Player of the Year.

== High school ==
Boyd went to William Howard Taft High School in San Antonio, Texas, where he was the San Antonio Express-News player of the year as a senior after averaging 21.6 points and 11.7 rebounds per game. For college, he signed with the Long Island Blackbirds and coach Jim Ferry.

== College career ==
As a freshman in the 2008–09 season, Boyd averaged 10.5 points and 6.4 rebounds per game, earning Northeast Conference (NEC) Rookie of the Year honors. Following his freshman campaign, Boyd was diagnosed with noncompaction cardiomyopathy. He was forced to sit out the 2009–10 season with a medical redshirt.

Boyd came back the following season, averaging 13 points and 8.9 rebounds per game and leading the Blackbirds to a 27–6 record and NEC regular-season and tournament titles. LIU made the 2011 NCAA tournament, falling in the second round to number two seed North Carolina. Boyd was named first team All-Conference and Northeast Conference Player of the Year.

In his junior season, Boyd again led the Blackbirds to conference regular season and tournament championships. He was the MVP of the 2012 NEC tournament, scoring 18 points and grabbing 10 rebounds in the championship game against Robert Morris. For the season, Boyd averaged 17.4 points and 9.3 rebounds per game. He was named first team All-NEC and Northeast Conference Player of the Year. At the end of the season, he was named an honorable mention All-American by the Associated Press.

In the offseason prior to the start of his senior season, Boyd was one of four Blackbirds players suspended following a fight at a campus party. After the school reviewed the matter, the four were reinstated to the team and Boyd and his teammates each received two-game suspensions. However, Boyd's troubles for the season did not end as he tore the Anterior cruciate ligament in his knee in a game against Rice on December 12, 2012, ending his season after only eight games. Boyd was granted a sixth year of eligibility by the NCAA. In July 2013, Boyd again tore his ACL and was expected to miss most of the 2013–14 season. LIU coach Jack Perri advised that Boyd would return to the Blackbirds' lineup in January 2014 at the earliest. However, Boyd re-tore his ACL for a third time during a non-contact drill in late December 2013, officially ending his college career.

== Club career ==
Boyd played for London Lightning of the National Basketball League of Canada from 2016 to 2018. In 2017 he tore his ACL for the fourth time. He returned to the court the following season and averaged 12.5 points and 6.3 rebounds in 31 games for the Lightning.

In July 2018, he signed with reigning Icelandic champions KR of the Úrvalsdeild karla. His first game was in the Super Cup where he scored 28 points in KR's 72–103 loss to Tindastóll. In his Úrvalsdeild debut, Boyd had 37 points and 12 rebounds in a victory against Skallagrímur. On December 20, he scored a season high 39 points along with 13 rebounds in a victory against Breiðablik. In 22 regular season games, Boyd averaged 22.5 points and 9.9 rebounds. On May 4, 2019, he won the Icelandic championship with KR, after beating ÍR in the Úrvalsdeild finals, where he was named the Playoffs MVP. In the finals series he averaged 19.6 points, 9.0 rebounds and 3.8 assists. After the season he was named the Úrvalsdeild Foreign Player of the Year.

In November 2019, Boyd signed with the Zhuhai Wolf Warriors of the ASEAN Basketball League.

On December 16, 2025, Boyd signed with the Formosa Dreamers of the Taiwan Professional Basketball League (TPBL).

On February 23, 2026, Boyd announced his retirement from professional basketball.
