= Tom Moore (basketball) =

American basketball player-coach

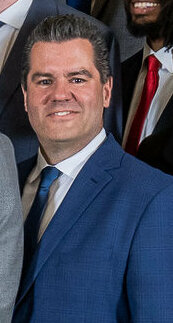
- Moore in 2023

Biographical details
- Born: May 12, 1965 (age 61)
- Education: Boston University

Coaching career (HC unless noted)
- 1987–1988: Worcester State (assistant)
- 1988–1989: Assumption (assistant)
- 1989–1994: Worcester State
- 1994–2007: UConn (assistant)
- 2007–2017: Quinnipiac
- 2017–2018: Rhode Island (assistant)
- 2018–2025: UConn (assistant)

Administrative career (AD unless noted)
- 2025-2026: UConn (general manager)

Head coaching record
- Overall: 238–205 (.537)
- Tournaments: 0–1 (NIT); 0–1 (CBI); 0–2 (CIT)

Accomplishments and honors

Championships
- As head coach: NEC regular season (2010); As assistant: 4 NCAA Division I tournament (1999, 2004, 2023, 2024)

Awards
- NEC Coach of the Year (2010)

Tom Moore (born May 12, 1965) is the former general manager of men's basketball at the University of Connecticut. He previously served as an assistant from 1994 to 2007 under Huskies' Hall of Fame and three-time NCAA Championship coach Jim Calhoun. Moore is also the former head men's basketball coach at Quinnipiac University, taking over the position vacated by Joe DeSantis in 2007 after 13 years at the University of Connecticut and five seasons of previous head coaching experience at Worcester State College. Moore is a 1983 high school graduate of Saint John's Shrewsbury and is a 1987 graduate of Boston University.

== Head coaching record ==
Record table
Season	Team	Overall	Conference	Standing	Postseason
Worcester State Lancers (Massachusetts State Collegiate Athletic Conference) (1989–1994)
1989–90	Worcester State	12–15	4–8		
1990–91	Worcester State	16–11	8–4		
1991–92	Worcester State	11–15	2–10		
1992–93	Worcester State	19–8	8–4		
1993–94	Worcester State	18–10	7–5		
Worcester State:		76–59 (.563)	29–31 (.483)		
Quinnipiac Bobcats (Northeast Conference) (2007–2013)
2007–08	Quinnipiac	15–15	11–7	5th	
2008–09	Quinnipiac	15–16	10–8	5th	
2009–10	Quinnipiac	23–10	15–3	1st	NIT First Round
2010–11	Quinnipiac	22–10	13–5	2nd	CIT First Round
2011–12	Quinnipiac	18–14	10–8	T–5th	CBI First Round
2012–13	Quinnipiac	15–16	11–7	T–6th	
Quinnipiac Bobcats (Metro Atlantic Athletic Conference) (2013–2017)
2013–14	Quinnipiac	20–12	14–6	T–3rd	CIT First Round
2014–15	Quinnipiac	15–15	9–11	6th	
2015–16	Quinnipiac	9–21	6–14	9th	
2016–17	Quinnipiac	10–21	7–13	8th	
Quinnipiac:		162–146 (.526)	106–79 (.573)		
Total:		238–205 (.537)			
National champion Postseason invitational champion Conference regular season champion Conference regular season and conference tournament champion Division regular season champion Division regular season and conference tournament champion Conference tournament champion
