= 2011–12 Wagner Seahawks men's basketball team =

American college basketball season

2011–12 Wagner Seahawks men's basketball
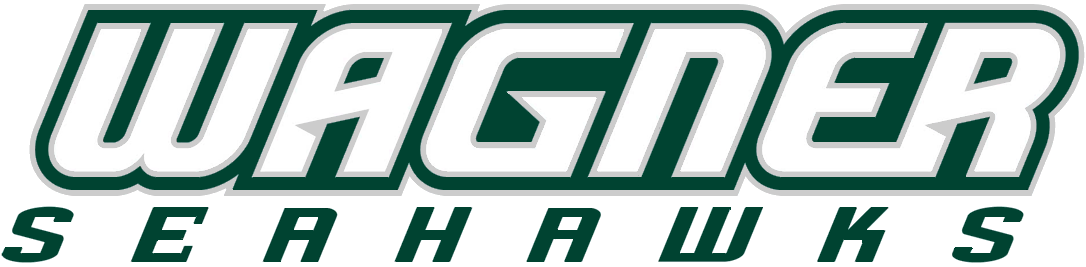
- Conference: Northeast Conference
- Record: 25–6 (15–3 NEC)
- Head coach: Dan Hurley (2nd season)
- Assistant coaches: Bobby Hurley; Bashir Mason; Scott Smith
- Home arena: Spiro Sports Center

2011–12 Northeast Conference men's basketball standings
	Conf.				Overall
Team	W		L	PCT	W		L	PCT
Long Island †	16	–	2	.889	25	–	9	.735
Wagner	15	–	3	.833	25	–	6	.806
Robert Morris	13	–	5	.722	26	–	10	.722
St. Francis (NY)	12	–	6	.667	15	–	15	.500
Quinnipiac	10	–	8	.556	18	–	14	.563
Monmouth	10	–	8	.556	12	–	20	.375
Central Connecticut	10	–	8	.556	13	–	16	.448
Sacred Heart	8	–	10	.444	14	–	18	.438
Mount St. Mary's	6	–	12	.333	8	–	21	.276
Saint Francis (PA)	5	–	13	.278	6	–	23	.207
Fairleigh Dickinson	2	–	16	.111	3	–	26	.103
*Bryant	1	–	17	.056	2	–	28	.067
† 2012 Northeast Conference tournament winner As of March 17, 2012; Rankings from AP Poll; *Ineligible for conference tournament

The 2011–12 Wagner Seahawks men's basketball team represented Wagner College during the 2011–12 NCAA Division I men's basketball season. The Seahawks, led by second year head coach Dan Hurley, played their home games at Spiro Sports Center and are members of the Northeast Conference. They finished the season 25–6, 15–3 in NEC play to finish in second place. They lost in the semifinals of the NEC Basketball tournament to Robert Morris. Despite having 25 wins, the Seahawks did not accept an invitation to a postseason tournament.

== Roster ==
Number	Name	Position	Height	Weight	Year	Hometown
3	Tyler Murray	Guard	6–5	200	Senior	Toronto, Ontario
4	Marcus Burton	Guard	6–0	170	Freshman	Charlotte, North Carolina
5	Naofall Folahan	Forward	6–11	215	Sophomore	Cotonou, Benin
11	Chris Martin	Guard	5–11	185	Senior	Sicklerville, New Jersey
12	Hugo Naurais	Forward	6–8	210	Freshman	Nîmes, France
15	Kenneth Ortiz	Guard	6–0	200	Sophomore	Newark, New Jersey
21	Orlando Parker	Forward	6–8	205	Sophomore	Orlando, Florida
23	Jonathon Williams	Guard	6–6	225	Junior	Richmond, California
24	Latif Rivers	Guard	6–1	175	Sophomore	Elizabeth, New Jersey
25	Josh Thompson	Forward	6–5	200	Junior	Richland, New Jersey
33	Mario Moody	Forward	6–7	210	Freshman	East Orange, New Jersey
42	Ryan Schrotenboer	Forward	6–9	225	Junior	Fort Myers, Florida
50	Brett Stewart	Forward	6–9	230	Sophomore	Stevensville, Maryland

== Schedule ==
Date time, TV	Rank^{#}	Opponent^{#}	Result	Record	Site (attendance) city, state
Regular season
November 12, 2011*; 5:00 pm		at Princeton	W 73–57	1–0	Jadwin Gymnasium (2,444); Princeton, NJ
November 14, 2011*; 7:30 pm, SNY		at No. 4 Connecticut	L 66–78	1–1	Harry A. Gampel Pavilion (9,217); Storrs, CT
November 16, 2011*; 7:30 pm		North Carolina Central	W 87–83	2–1	Spiro Sports Center (1,922); Staten Island, NY
November 19, 2011*; 7:00 pm		at Lafayette	W 76–70	3–1	Kirby Sports Center (1,846); Easton, PA
November 22, 2011*; 7:00 pm		at Penn	W 71–65	4–1	The Palestra (2,144); Philadelphia, PA
November 26, 2011*; 4:00 pm		Delaware State	W 85–62	5–1	Spiro Sports Center (1,813); Staten Island, NY
December 1, 2011; 7:00 pm		at Long Island	L 73–78	5–2 (0–1)	Athletic, Recreation & Wellness Center (1,201); Brooklyn, NY
December 3, 2011; 7:00 pm		St. Francis (NY)	W 90–50	6–2 (1–1)	Spiro Sports Center (1,889); Staten Island, NY
December 6, 2011*; 7:00 pm		Hofstra	W 58–43	7–2	Spiro Sports Center (1,273); Staten Island, NY
December 10, 2011*; 4:00 pm		Lehigh	L 69–70	7–3	Spiro Sports Center (1,326); Staten Island, NY
December 23, 2011*; 8:00 pm, ESPNU		at No. 15 Pittsburgh	W 59–54	8–3	Petersen Events Center (9,315); Pittsburgh, PA
December 29, 2011*; 9:00 pm		vs. Air Force; Cable Car Classic	W 72–61	9–3	Leavey Center (1,782); Santa Clara, CA
December 30, 2011*; 11:30 pm		at Santa Clara; Cable Car Classic	W 64–62	10–3	Leavey Center (1,702); Santa Clara, CA
January 5, 2012; 7:00 pm		at Fairleigh Dickinson	W 88–64	11–3 (2–1)	Rothman Center (1,127); Hackensack, NJ
January 7, 2012; 12:00 pm, MSG+		at Monmouth	W 89–79	12–3 (3–1)	Multipurpose Activity Center (1,594); West Long Branch, NJ
January 12, 2012; 7:00 pm		Bryant	W 78–61	13–3 (4–1)	Spiro Sports Center (1,268); Staten Island, NY
January 14, 2012; 7:00 pm		Central Connecticut	W 67–58	14–3 (5–1)	Spiro Sports Center (2,032); Staten Island, NY
January 19, 2012; 7:00 pm		at St. Francis (NY)	W 73–61	15–3 (6–1)	Generoso Pope Athletic Complex (978); Brooklyn Heights, NY
January 21, 2012; 7:00 pm, ESPNU		Long Island	L 66–73	15–4 (6–2)	Spiro Sports Center (2,412); Staten Island, NY
January 26, 2012; 7:00 pm		at Sacred Heart	W 73–54	16–4 (7–2)	William H. Pitt Center (656); Fairfield, CT
January 28, 2012; 2:00 pm		at Quinnipiac	W 51–50	17–4 (8–2)	TD Bank Sports Center (2,308); Hamden, CT
February 2, 2012; 7:00 pm, MSG		Robert Morris	W 80–69	18–4 (9–2)	Spiro Sports Center (1,709); Staten Island, NY
February 4, 2012; 7:00 pm		Saint Francis (PA)	W 72–54	19–4 (10–2)	Spiro Sports Center (1,910); Staten Island, NY
February 8, 2012; 7:00 pm		at Mount St. Mary's	W 59–44	20–4 (11–2)	Knott Arena (904); Emmitsburg, MD
February 11, 2012; 7:00 pm		Mount St. Mary's	W 74–57	21–4 (12–2)	Spiro Sports Center (1,853); Staten Island, NY
February 16, 2012; 7:00 pm		Monmouth	W 74–67	22–4 (13–2)	Spiro Sports Center (1,422); Staten Island, NY
February 18, 2012; 7:00 pm		Fairleigh Dickinson	W 90–70	23–4 (14–2)	Spiro Sports Center (1,725); Staten Island, NY
February 23, 2012; 7:00 pm		at Bryant	W 86–73	24–4 (15–2)	Chace Athletic Center (786); Smithfield, RI
February 25, 2012; 3:30 pm		at Central Connecticut	L 61–78	24–5 (15–3)	William H. Detrick Gymnasium (2,712); New Britain, CT
NEC tournament
March 1, 2012; 7:00 pm	(2)	(7) Central Connecticut; Quarterfinals	W 87–77	25–5	Spiro Sports Center (1,708); Staten Island, NY
March 4, 2012; 12:00 pm, MSG/FCS	(2)	(3) Robert Morris; Semifinals	L 64–71	25–6	Spiro Sports Center (1,705); Staten Island, NY
*Non-conference game. ^{#}Rankings from AP Poll. (#) Tournament seedings in parentheses. All times are in Eastern Time.
