= 2010–11 North Carolina Tar Heels men's basketball team =

American college basketball season

2010–11 North Carolina Tar Heels men's basketball

ACC regular season champions

NCAA tournament, Elite Eight
- Conference: Atlantic Coast Conference

Ranking
- Coaches: No. 8
- AP: No. 7
- Record: 29–8 (14–2 ACC)
- Head coach: Roy Williams (8th season)
- Assistant coaches: Steve Robinson; C. B. McGrath; Jerod Haase
- Home arena: Dean Smith Center

2010–11 ACC men's basketball standings
	Conf.				Overall
Team	W		L	PCT	W		L	PCT
No. 7 North Carolina	14	–	2	.875	29	–	8	.784
No. 3 Duke †	13	–	3	.813	32	–	5	.865
Florida State	11	–	5	.688	23	–	11	.676
Clemson	9	–	7	.563	22	–	12	.647
Boston College	9	–	7	.563	21	–	13	.618
Virginia Tech	9	–	7	.563	22	–	12	.647
Maryland	7	–	9	.438	19	–	14	.576
Virginia	7	–	9	.438	16	–	15	.516
Miami (FL)	6	–	10	.375	21	–	15	.583
NC State	5	–	11	.313	15	–	16	.484
Georgia Tech	5	–	11	.313	13	–	18	.419
Wake Forest	1	–	15	.063	8	–	24	.250
† 2011 ACC tournament winner As of March 27, 2011; Rankings from AP poll

The 2010–11 North Carolina Tar Heels men's basketball team represented the University of North Carolina at Chapel Hill in the 2010–11 NCAA Division I men's basketball season. The head coach was Roy Williams. The team played its home games in the Dean Smith Center in Chapel Hill, North Carolina and was a member of the Atlantic Coast Conference. They finished the season 29–8, 14–2 in ACC play to win the conference regular-season championship. They advanced to the championship game of the 2011 ACC men's basketball tournament before falling to Duke. They received an at-large bid to the 2011 NCAA Division I men's basketball tournament, where they advanced to the Elite Eight before falling to Kentucky.

This was the 101st season of basketball in the school's history.

== Preseason ==
The team lost seniors Deon Thompson and Marcus Ginyard to graduation, while sophomore Ed Davis made himself available for the 2010 NBA draft. The team was dealt an unexpected loss as twin freshmen David and Travis Wear announced that they would transfer from UNC on May 6, 2010, ultimately landing at UCLA. Additionally, it was announced in October 2010 that red-shirt senior Will Graves had been removed from the team for violating team rules.

=== Recruiting ===
Coach Roy Williams signed a three-man class for 2010.

College recruiting
Name	Hometown	School	Height	Weight	Commit date
Harrison Barnes; SF	Ames, Iowa	Ames (IA)	6 ft 8 in (2.03 m)	210 lb (95 kg)	Nov 13, 2009
Harrison Barnes; SF	Recruit ratings: Scout: Rivals: (98)				
Reggie Bullock; SG	Kinston, North Carolina	Kinston (NC)	6 ft 6 in (1.98 m)	190 lb (86 kg)	Jan 9, 2008
Reggie Bullock; SG	Recruit ratings: Scout: Rivals: (96)				
Kendall Marshall; PG	Dumfries, Virginia	Bishop O'Connell (VA)	6 ft 4 in (1.93 m)	180 lb (82 kg)	Sep 19, 2007
Kendall Marshall; PG	Recruit ratings: Scout: Rivals: (95)				
Overall recruit ranking: Scout: 3 Rivals: 4 ESPN: 3
Note: In many cases, Scout, Rivals, 247Sports, On3, and ESPN may conflict in their listings of height and weight.; In these cases, the average was taken. ESPN grades are on a 100-point scale.; Sources: "2010 Team Ranking". Rivals.

== Season ==
UNC took part in the 2010 Puerto Rico Tip-Off and the ACC – Big Ten Challenge. The following schools competed in the 2010 Puerto Rico Tip-Off: Davidson, Hofstra, Minnesota, Nebraska, North Carolina, Vanderbilt, West Virginia and Western Kentucky

UNC had already scheduled non-conference games against Kentucky, Texas (in Greensboro), Charleston, Long Beach State, at Illinois, at UNC-Asheville, at Evansville, and at Rutgers (Madison Square Garden).

=== Non-conference season ===
UNC beat Lipscomb 84–66 in their first game of the season. In their second game, which was their first game in the Puerto Rico Tip-Off, they beat Hofstra 108–63. In their third game, they lost to the University of Minnesota 72–67. In their fourth game, they lost to Vanderbilt 72–65. The two losses caused UNC to fall in the rankings to #25. The 2–2 start was their worst since the 2001–02 season. After closer-than-expected wins against UNC Asheville and College of Charleston, UNC dropped out of the rankings.

In their ACC-Big Ten Challenge game, the Tar Heels were throttled on the road against Illinois. However, they followed up that loss with a win over then 11th-ranked Kentucky. They had a chance to return to the rankings with a win over Texas in what was essentially a home game at the Greensboro Coliseum, but lost on a last-second shot by the Longhorns' Cory Joseph.

=== Conference season ===
The Tar Heels opened ACC play with close wins over the league's two Virginia teams. However, they came out flat against Georgia Tech, losing by 20 points. They would not lose again for almost a month, with the only close game in that stretch being against Miami. That game was decided on a last-second three-pointer by Harrison Barnes. The month-long winning streak catapulted them back into the rankings for the first time since December.

On February 4, the Tar Heels were broadsided when point guard Larry Drew II abruptly left the team. The Tar Heels beat Florida State in their first game without Drew, but in a subsequent game against Duke, after leading all of the first half, they faltered in the second half and lost 79–73. They would not lose again for over a month, despite close games against Clemson and Florida State.

This set up a regular-season finale against Duke with the winner clinching the ACC regular-season title and the top seed in the 2011 ACC tournament—the fifth winner-take-all game in the series' 92-season history. The Tar Heels won with relative ease, 81–67, to win their 28th ACC regular-season title and fifth outright title in seven years. It also completed the Tar Heels' fourth undefeated season in the Smith Center.

The Tar Heels did not have an easy time of it in the ACC Tournament in Greensboro, despite being the top seed. In their first-round game against Miami, they trailed for the entire game before going on a 27–6 run in the final 10 minutes, capped by a Tyler Zeller tip-in with 0.2 seconds left to win the game 61–59. It was the biggest postseason comeback in school history. Against Clemson, they trailed by 11 points before rallying to force overtime, then won 92–87.

This set up their third matchup of the season against Duke; the Tar Heels would lose to the Blue Devils 75–58.

== NCAA tournament ==
Despite the loss, the Tar Heels returned to the NCAA tournament after a one-year absence as the No. 2 seed in the East Regional. They played their first two games at Time Warner Cable Arena in Charlotte. They played there alongside bitter rival Duke, who was the top seed in the West Regional.

The Tar Heels had a tough first game against Long Island before pulling away late for a 102–87 win. They then beat Washington on the strength of a combined 45 points from Zeller and Barnes. They advanced to the Sweet 16 at the Prudential Center in Newark.

The Tar Heels first faced the 11-seeded Marquette Golden Eagles in the Sweet 16 in Newark. Marquette had an off night, and the Heels dominated their opponent with a score of 81–63. UNC next played the Kentucky Wildcats team, fresh off a win against the overall number one seed – the Ohio State Buckeyes. UNC was down early and remained down by 8 at halftime. Despite the barrage of 3-points from the Wildcats, UNC launched a comeback to tie the game late. Freshman Brandon Knight hit a clutch 3-pointer, and Kentucky beat UNC 76–69 to advance to the Final Four in Houston.

== Roster ==
Name	#	Position	Height	Weight	Year	Home town	High school
Harrison Barnes	40	Forward	6–8	210	Freshman	Ames, IA	Ames
Daniel Bolick	3	Guard	5–10	175	Senior	Carrboro, NC	Chapel Hill
Reggie Bullock	35	Guard	6–7	190	Freshman	Kinston, NC	Kinston
Stewart Cooper	15	Forward	6–5	205	Junior	Winston-Salem, NC	Forsyth Country Day
Patrick Crouch	30	Guard	5–11	175	Junior	Asheville, NC	T.C. Roberson
Larry Drew II*	11	Guard	6–2	180	Junior	Encino, CA	Woodland Hills Taft
David Dupont	22	Forward	6–5	195	Junior	Greensboro, NC	Grimsley
Van Hatchell	13	Forward	6–4	185	Senior	Chapel Hill, NC	Cresset Christian
John Henson	31	Forward	6–10	210	Sophomore	Tampa, FL	Sickles
D. J. Johnston	32	Forward	6–4	195	Junior	Lower Gwynedd, PA	Germantown
Justin Knox	25	Forward	6–9	240	Graduate	Tuscaloosa, AL	Central
Kendall Marshall	5	Guard	6–3	186	Freshman	Dumfries, VA	Bishop O'Connell
Leslie McDonald	2	Guard	6–4	215	Sophomore	Memphis, TN	Briarcrest Christian
Dexter Strickland	1	Guard	6–3	180	Sophomore	Rahway, NJ	St. Patrick
Justin Watts	24	Guard	6–4	210	Junior	Durham, NC	Jordan
Tyler Zeller	44	Forward	7–0	250	Junior	Washington, IN	Washington

* Left team February 4, 2011

== Schedule ==
Date time, TV	Rank^{#}	Opponent^{#}	Result	Record	Site (attendance) city, state
Exhibition
November 5, 2010*; 7:30 pm		Barton	W 108–67	—	Dean E. Smith Center (14,259); Chapel Hill, NC
Regular season
November 12, 2010*; 7:00 pm, FSSO	No. 8	Lipscomb	W 80–66	1–0	Dean E. Smith Center (16,432); Chapel Hill, NC
November 18, 2010*; 5:00 pm, ESPN2	No. 8	vs. Hofstra; Puerto Rico Tip-Off	W 107–63	2–0	Coliseo de Puerto Rico (7,205); San Juan, PR
November 19, 2010*; 8:30 pm, ESPNU	No. 8	vs. Minnesota; Puerto Rico Tip-Off	L 67–72	2–1	Coliseo de Puerto Rico (10,127); San Juan, PR
November 21, 2010*; 5:30 pm, ESPN2	No. 8	vs. Vanderbilt; Puerto Rico Tip-Off	L 65–72	2–2	Coliseo de Puerto Rico (11,575); San Juan, PR
November 23, 2010*; 7:00 pm, FSSO	No. 25	UNC Asheville	W 80–69	3–2	Dean E. Smith Center (14,428); Chapel Hill, NC
November 28, 2010*; 5:30 pm, FSN	No. 25	College of Charleston	W 74–69	4–2	Dean E. Smith Center (15,932); Chapel Hill, NC
November 30, 2010*; 9:30 pm, ESPN		at No. 19 Illinois; ACC–Big Ten Challenge	L 67–79	4–3	Assembly Hall (16,618); Champaign, IL
December 4, 2010*; 12:30 pm, CBS		No. 10 Kentucky	W 75–73	5–3	Dean E. Smith Center (20,695); Chapel Hill, NC
December 8, 2010*; 7:00 pm, ESPNU		at Evansville	W 76–49	6–3	Roberts Municipal Stadium (12,116); Evansville, IN
December 11, 2010*; 7:00 pm, FSSO		Long Beach State	W 96–91	7–3	Dean E. Smith Center (16,571); Chapel Hill, NC
December 18, 2010*; 4:00 pm, CBS		vs. No. 22 Texas	L 76–78	7–4	Greensboro Coliseum (20,787); Greensboro, NC
December 21, 2010*; 7:00 pm, ESPN2		William & Mary	W 85–60	8–4	Dean E. Smith Center (17,357); Chapel Hill, NC
December 28, 2010*; 9:00 pm, ESPN2		vs. Rutgers	W 78–55	9–4	Madison Square Garden (9,401); New York, NY
January 2, 2011*; 3:30 pm, FSSO		Saint Francis (PA)	W 103–54	10–4	Dean E. Smith Center (17,613); Chapel Hill, NC
January 8, 2011; 12:00 pm, Raycom		at Virginia	W 62–56	11–4 (1–0)	John Paul Jones Arena (14,231); Charlottesville, VA
January 13, 2011; 9:00 pm, ESPN		Virginia Tech	W 64–61	12–4 (2–0)	Dean E. Smith Center (21,089); Chapel Hill, NC
January 16, 2011; 7:45 pm, FSN		at Georgia Tech	L 58–78	12–5 (2–1)	Alexander Memorial Coliseum (8,125); Atlanta, GA
January 18, 2011; 8:00 pm, Raycom		Clemson	W 75–65	13–5 (3–1)	Dean E. Smith Center (20,352); Chapel Hill, NC
January 26, 2011; 7:30 pm, ESPN2		at Miami (FL)	W 74–71	14–5 (4–1)	BankUnited Center (6,026); Miami, FL
January 29, 2011; 2:00 pm, ESPN		NC State; Carolina–NC State rivalry	W 84–64	15–5 (5–1)	Dean E. Smith Center (21,750); Chapel Hill, NC
February 1, 2011; 9:00 pm, Raycom	No. 23	at Boston College	W 106–74	16–5 (6–1)	Conte Forum (7,883); Chestnut Hill, MA
February 6, 2011; 2:00 pm, FSN	No. 23	Florida State	W 89–69	17–5 (7–1)	Dean E. Smith Center (20,945); Chapel Hill, NC
February 9, 2011; 9:00 pm, ESPN	No. 20	at No. 5 Duke; Carolina–Duke rivalry	L 73–79	17–6 (7–2)	Cameron Indoor Stadium (9,314); Durham, NC
February 12, 2011; 1:00 pm, Raycom	No. 20	at Clemson	W 64–62	18–6 (8–2)	Littlejohn Coliseum (10,000); Clemson, SC
February 15, 2011; 8:00 pm, Raycom	No. 19	Wake Forest	W 78–64	19–6 (9–2)	Dean E. Smith Center (20,229); Chapel Hill, NC
February 19, 2011; 4:00 pm, ESPN	No. 19	Boston College	W 48–46	20–6 (10–2)	Dean E. Smith Center (21,159); Chapel Hill, NC
February 23, 2011; 9:00 pm, Raycom	No. 19	at NC State; Carolina–NC State rivalry	W 75–63	21–6 (11–2)	RBC Center (19,700); Raleigh, NC
February 27, 2011; 7:45 pm, FSN	No. 19	Maryland	W 87–76	22–6 (12–2)	Dean E. Smith Center (20,853); Chapel Hill, NC
March 2, 2011; 7:00 pm, ESPN	No. 13	at Florida State	W 72–70	23–6 (13–2)	Donald L. Tucker Center (12,030); Tallahassee, FL
March 5, 2011; 8:00 pm, CBS	No. 13	No. 4 Duke; Carolina-Duke rivalry	W 81–67	24–6 (14–2)	Dean E. Smith Center (21,750); Chapel Hill, NC
ACC tournament
March 11, 2011; 12:00 pm, ESPN2	(1) No. 6	vs. (9) Miami (FL); ACC Quarterfinals	W 61–59	25–6	Greensboro Coliseum (23,381); Greensboro, NC
March 12, 2011; 1:00 pm, ESPN	(1) No. 6	vs. (4) Clemson; ACC Semifinals	W 92–87 ^{OT}	26–6	Greensboro Coliseum (23,381); Greensboro, NC
March 13, 2011; 1:00 pm, ESPN	(1) No. 6	vs. (2) No. 5 Duke; ACC Championship Game	L 58–75	26–7	Greensboro Coliseum (23,381); Greensboro, NC
NCAA tournament
March 18, 2011*; 7:15 pm, CBS	(2 E) No. 7	vs. (15 E) Long Island; NCAA Second round	W 102–87	27–7	Time Warner Cable Arena (16,852); Charlotte, NC
March 20, 2011*; 12:15 pm, CBS	(2 E) No. 7	vs. (7 E) No. 23 Washington; NCAA Third round	W 86–83	28–7	Time Warner Cable Arena (18,329); Charlotte, NC
March 25, 2011*; 7:15 pm, CBS	(2 E) No. 7	vs. (11 E) Marquette; NCAA Sweet Sixteen	W 81–63	29–7	Prudential Center (18,343); Newark, NJ
March 27, 2011*; 4:45 pm, CBS	(2 E) No. 7	vs. (4 E) No. 11 Kentucky; NCAA Elite Eight	L 69–76	29–8	Prudential Center (18,278); Newark, NJ
*Non-conference game. ^{#}Rankings from AP Poll. (#) Tournament seedings in parentheses. E=NCAA East Regional. All times are in Eastern Time.

== Blue Steel ==
In the 2010–2011 season, the term "Blue Steel" was coined to describe the North Carolina Tar Heels men's basketball team walk-ons. Blue Steel is composed of six players who, despite being non-scholarship athletes, have a position on the team and play a key role in its development. They are led by Basketball Hall of Fame coach Roy Williams, who is third all time in the NCAA for winning percentage.

=== Roster and statistics ===
Patrick Crouch – a junior guard
Daniel Bolick – a senior guard
D.J. Johnston – a junior forward
Van Hatchell – a senior forward
David Dupont – a junior forward
Stewart Cooper – a junior forward

##	Player	GP-GS	Min	Avg	FG-FGA	Pct	3FG-FGA	Pct	FT-FTA	Pct	Off	Def	Tot	Avg	PF	FO	A	TO	Blk	Stl	Pts	Avg
30	Patrick Crouch	12–0	20	1.7	4–8	.500	1–3	.333	0–0	.000	0	1	1	0.1	5	0	0	3	0	0	9	0.8
03	Daniel Bolick	14–1	19	1.4	1–4	.250	0–1	.000	4–4	1.000	0	5	5	0.4	1	0	2	1	0	0	6	0.4
32	D.J. Johnston	13–1	21	1.6	2–8	.250	0–1	.000	0–0	.000	2	6	8	0.6	0	0	1	1	1	0	4	0.3
13	Van Hatchell	11–1	16	1.5	0–5	.000	0–4	.000	1–2	.500	1	3	4	0.4	2	0	1	2	0	0	1	0.1
22	David Dupont	12–0	18	1.5	0–4	.000	0–3	.000	0–0	.000	2	3	5	0.4	1	0	1	1	0	0	0	0.0
15	Stewart Cooper	12–0	17	1.4	0–2	.000	0–0	.000	0–0	.000	1	3	4	0.3	2	0	1	1	0	0	0	0.0

=== History ===
==== Coinage of name ====
The term "Blue Steel" was created by walk-on member Stewart Cooper, a 2010–2011 junior from Forsyth Country Day School, and it quickly gained prominence. Although the players to which it refers were once known by nicknames such as "the JV guys" and "the blue team", the new term "Blue Steel" is one that is now widely known and used by members of the student body, faculty, and Tar Heel fans. Beyond the local fanbase, sports reporters around the country have begun to use it as well.

The Blue Steel movement first caught on in the 2010–2011 season. At the end of North Carolina’s 84–64 win over N.C. State at the Dean Smith Center on January 29, fans chanted their new group name. The chant was at its optimum in Saturday’s pre-game introductions and when the walk-ons went to cut down the nets after three of them started against Duke on Senior Night.

==== Players on the name "Blue Steel" ====
BOLICK: Williams called us a combination of "J.V." or "Parentheses." On the actual practice plans, all the walk-ons' names were on the practice sheets in parentheses next to the player they'd substitute in for. So he'd say, "Parentheses, get in there." We said, "We can't go with being called the parentheses."

COOPER: We didn't want to tell Williams to start calling us [Blue Steel]. We told one of the assistant coaches.

BOLICK: The assistant coaches started calling us Blue Steel at the beginning of the week. By the end of the week, Coach Williams had caught on as well.

COOPER: It was pretty funny the first time he said it. He said he liked it. He's never really gone back.

JOHNSTON: It definitely started off in practice, not as sort of a schtick-type thing, which is what it turned into. When he first said it in a game, we looked at each other like, "Nice."

=== Significance ===
==== Twitter ====
Blue Steel has approximately 10,000 Twitter fans. They are known for "tweeting from the bench" during basketball games. Their first tweet was on December 15, 2010 and was "What's up world? 2010–11 UNC basketball walk-ons fresh on the twitter scene. stay tuned FRIENDS." Some other examples of Blue Steel tweets are:

• "You're welcome Tar Heel fans. If we didn't get dunked on every day in practice, you wouldn't be able to see it in the game. #feelthesteel"

• "bucket, drawn charge, airball and one of the biggest blocks ever in the nc state game...the world saw all aspects of Steel's game. #respect"

• "We're gonna have a far better view than the "crazies" and we didn't waste all of January sleeping in a tent. #feelthesteel"

==== Videos ====
Blue Steel players filmed in action along with comments from members and team players. Submitted with permission from creator.

==== Playtime in big games ====
In the rival matchup between North Carolina and Duke University in 2011, Roy Williams started the senior members of Blue Steel.

Harrison Barnes' audio response to question about Blue Steel players: "From the walk-ons starting, to the students rushing the court, is this your finest memory as a Tar Heel thus far?" "Just to see Blue Steel get some recognition out there and be able to start—they work so hard and are the unsung heroes of this team. Then to have them rush the court, we haven't had that happen this year, and it's a great experience to have that, to know that a ring is on the way. That's the best feeling.

In North Carolina's game against Clemson in the ACC tournament in Greensboro, North Carolina, Roy Williams took out all of his scholarship players and put Blue Steel in the game.

Point guard Kendall Marshall said in response to this occurrence, “Just to sit on the bench and hear coach telling us all of the things we’re doing wrong – in so many words that I can’t say here – to see Blue Steel out there giving it their all, it inspires you.”

Blue Steel had the opportunity to play in the 2011 NCAA tournament in the opening game against Long Island University and in the Sweet 16 game versus Marquette University.

During an NCAA press conference, Kendall Marshall said, "But, still, you've just gotta feel the Steel sometimes. They bring a whole other dimension to this team. They're part of that goofiness that we have. They started a name for themselves, and all the little things that bring us close – it's been great."

==== Hand signal ====
Blue Steel have their own hand gesture, called the "dip snap". This gesture is used as a sign of respect when Blue Steel players are entering the game. The steps for completing it are reportedly as follows:

1. Press your thumb and middle finger together
2. Let your forefinger fall limp
3. Raise your hand up and turn your wrist so that your hand faces you
4. Sling your hand down towards the floor, allowing your forefinger to snap against your other fingers
5. Repeat until ample signs of respect have been shown

==== Reporters ====
Ben Doster--"Blue Steel: New Look to an Old Tradition"

Dave Wilson--"North Carolina's 'Blue Steel' adds to sports pranks"

Dave Wilson--"Blue Steel, North Carolina's Walk-ons, Earn Cult Hero Status"

Conor Orr--"North Carolina vs. Kentucky: Meet 'Blue Steel,' the Tar Heels' humorous, charitable bench"

Adam Lucas--"Lucas: Prank You Very Much"

Jerome Richard--"'Blue Steel' steals the show at start for Tar Heels"

Lennon Dodson--""Blue Steel" emerges as more than just bench warmers"

Jason Jennings--"UNC's Blue Steel builds a brand"

==== T-shirts ====
Blue Steel recently released their own T-shirts with the slogan "Feel the Steel". Proceeds from the shirts go to a Camp Kesem North Carolina, a week-long summer camp for youth whose parent or guardian have cancer.

==== Charity date auction ====
On February 14, 2011, UNC Chapel Hill held an auction for the charity Dance Marathon. Dates with members of the school's basketball team were auctioned off in order to support the organization, which aims to raise money for sick children. Specifically, members of Blue Steel were auctioned off for $375.

== Team players drafted into the NBA ==
Year	Round	Pick	Player	NBA club
2012	1	7	Harrison Barnes	Golden State Warriors
2012	1	13	Kendall Marshall	Phoenix Suns
2012	1	14	John Henson	Milwaukee Bucks
2012	1	17	Tyler Zeller	Boston Celtics
2013	1	25	Reggie Bullock	Los Angeles Clippers

== See also ==
- 2011 NCAA Division I men's basketball tournament
- 2010–11 NCAA Division I men's basketball season
- 2010–11 NCAA Division I men's basketball rankings
