= 2011–12 Robert Morris Colonials men's basketball team =

American college basketball season

2011–12 Robert Morris Colonials men's basketball

CIT, Quarterfinals
- Conference: Northeast Conference
- Record: 26–11 (13–5 NEC)
- Head coach: Andrew Toole (2nd season)
- Assistant coaches: Michael Byrnes; Matt Hahn; Robby Pridgen
- Home arena: Charles L. Sewall Center

2011–12 Northeast Conference men's basketball standings
	Conf.				Overall
Team	W		L	PCT	W		L	PCT
Long Island †	16	–	2	.889	25	–	9	.735
Wagner	15	–	3	.833	25	–	6	.806
Robert Morris	13	–	5	.722	26	–	10	.722
St. Francis (NY)	12	–	6	.667	15	–	15	.500
Quinnipiac	10	–	8	.556	18	–	14	.563
Monmouth	10	–	8	.556	12	–	20	.375
Central Connecticut	10	–	8	.556	13	–	16	.448
Sacred Heart	8	–	10	.444	14	–	18	.438
Mount St. Mary's	6	–	12	.333	8	–	21	.276
Saint Francis (PA)	5	–	13	.278	6	–	23	.207
Fairleigh Dickinson	2	–	16	.111	3	–	26	.103
*Bryant	1	–	17	.056	2	–	28	.067
† 2012 Northeast Conference tournament winner As of March 17, 2012; Rankings from AP Poll; *Ineligible for conference tournament

The 2011–12 Robert Morris Colonials men's basketball team represented Robert Morris University during the 2011–12 NCAA Division I men's basketball season. The Colonials, led by second year head coach Andrew Toole, played their home games at the Charles L. Sewall Center and are members of the Northeast Conference.

They finished the season 26–11, 13–5 in NEC play to finish in third place. They lost in the championship game of the NEC Basketball tournament to Long Island. They were invited to the 2012 CollegeInsider.com Tournament where they defeated Indiana State in the first round and Toledo in the second round before falling to Fairfield in the quarterfinals.

== Roster ==
Number	Name	Position	Height	Weight	Year	Hometown
1	Mike McFadden	Forward	6–8	220	Sophomore	Newark, New Jersey
2	Velton Jones	Guard	6–0	170	Junior	Philadelphia
3	Coron Williams	Guard	6–2	170	Sophomore	Midlothian, Virginia
4	David Appolon	Guard	6–2	180	Freshman	Philadelphia
5	Anthony Myers	Guard	5–11	170	Sophomore	Washington, D.C.
10	Treadwell Lewis	Guard	6–1	180	Junior	Shelton, Connecticut
11	Lijah Thompson	Forward/Center	6–7	215	Junior	Philadelphia
12	Darren Washington	Forward/Center	6–9	220	Freshman	Belleville, Michigan
20	Brandon Herman	Guard	6–1	190	Freshman	Chattanooga, Tennessee
22	Lucky Jones	Guard/Forward	6–5	220	Freshman	Newark, New Jersey
24	Lawrence Bridges	Forward	6–5	220	Senior	East Orange, New Jersey
25	Shane Sweigart	Guard	6–4	195	Junior	Harrisburg, Pennsylvania
34	Russell Johnson	Forward	6–6	180	Junior	Chester, Pennsylvania
45	Keith Armstrong	Forward	6–7	230	Freshman	Raleigh, North Carolina

== Schedule ==
Date time, TV	Rank^{#}	Opponent^{#}	Result	Record	Site (attendance) city, state
Exhibition
October 31, 2011*; 7:00 pm		Wheeling Jesuit	W 76–70	—	Charles L. Sewall Center (958); Moon Township, PA
Regular season
November 11, 2011*; 7:00 pm		Rider	W 83–57	1–0	Charles L. Sewall Center (1,822); Moon Township, PA
November 15, 2011*; 7:00 pm		at Saint Peter's	W 69–52	2–0	Yanitelli Center (1,028); Jersey City, NJ
November 19, 2011*; 7:00 pm		at Penn; Philly Hoop Group Classic	L 60–66	2–1	The Palestra (3,089); Philadelphia, PA
November 22, 2011*; 7:00 pm		at James Madison; Philly Hoop Group Classic	W 82–77	3–1	JMU Convocation Center (2,752); Harrisonburg, VA
November 25, 2011*; 4:30 pm, TCN		vs. La Salle; Philly Hoop Group Classic	W 51–44	4–1	The Palestra (1,211); Philadelphia, PA
November 27, 2011*; 5:00 pm, TCN		at No. 17 Pittsburgh; Philly Hoop Group Classic	L 71–81	4–2	Petersen Events Center (8,758); Pittsburgh, PA
December 1, 2011; 7:00 pm		Fairleigh Dickinson	W 66–54	5–2 (1–0)	Charles L. Sewall Center (1,281); Moon Township, PA
December 3, 2011; 7:00 pm		Monmouth	W 69–51	6–2 (2–0)	Charles L. Sewall Center (1,344); Moon Township, PA
December 5, 2011*; 7:00 pm		at Duquesne	W 64–60	7–2	Palumbo Center (2,687); Pittsburgh, PA
December 8, 2011*; 7:00 pm		Cleveland State	L 58–62	7–3	Charles L. Sewall Center (1,378); Moon Township, PA
December 17, 2011*; 7:00 pm		Louisiana–Lafayette	W 72–64	8–3	Charles L. Sewall Center (1,103); Moon Township, PA
December 20, 2011*; 7:00 pm		Hampton	W 64–54	9–3	Charles L. Sewall Center (1,004); Moon Township, PA
December 22, 2011*; 7:00 pm		at Youngstown State	W 59–56	10–3	Beeghly Center (1,898); Youngstown, OH
December 29, 2011*; 7:00 pm		at Memphis	L 47–64	10–4	FedExForum (16,436); Memphis, TN
January 2, 2012*; 7:00 pm		at Ohio	W 70–67	11–4	Convocation Center (6,018); Athens, OH
January 5, 2012; 7:00 pm		at Bryant	W 84–53	12–4 (3–0)	Chace Athletic Center (389); Smithfield, RI
January 7, 2012; 3:30 pm		at Central Connecticut	L 53–68	12–5 (3–1)	William H. Detrick Gymnasium (1,714); New Britain, CT
January 12, 2012; 7:00 pm		Quinnipiac	L 76–78	12–6 (3–2)	Charles L. Sewall Center (1,231); Moon Township, PA
January 14, 2012; 7:00 pm		Sacred Heart	W 70–67	13–6 (4–2)	Charles L. Sewall Center (1,078); Moon Township, PA
January 19, 2012; 7:00 pm		at Fairleigh Dickinson	W 67–55	14–6 (5–2)	Rothman Center (533); Hackensack, NJ
January 21, 2012; 7:00 pm		at Monmouth	W 81–73 ^{OT}	15–6 (6–2)	Multipurpose Activity Center (533); West Long Branch, NJ
January 26, 2012; 7:00 pm		Long Island	W 75–66	16–6 (7–2)	Charles L. Sewall Center (2,356); Moon Township, PA
January 28, 2012; 7:00 pm		St. Francis (NY)	L 68–81	16–7 (7–3)	Charles L. Sewall Center (1,378); Moon Township, PA
February 2, 2012; 7:00 pm		at Wagner	L 69–80	16–8 (7–4)	Spiro Sports Center (1,709); Staten Island, NY
February 4, 2012; 4:00 pm		at Mount St. Mary's	W 67–62	17–8 (8–4)	Knott Arena (2,003); Emmitsburg, MD
February 8, 2012; 7:00 pm		at Saint Francis (PA)	W 78–74	18–8 (9–4)	DeGol Arena (872); Loretto, PA
February 11, 2012; 7:00 pm		Saint Francis (PA)	W 70–56	19–8 (10–4)	Charles L. Sewall Center (1,459); Moon Township, PA
February 16, 2012; 7:00 pm		Bryant	W 69–40	20–8 (11–4)	Charles L. Sewall Center (1,021); Moon Township, PA
February 18, 2012; 7:00 pm		Central Connecticut	W 68–60	21–8 (12–4)	Charles L. Sewall Center (2,149); Moon Township, PA
February 23, 2012; 7:00 pm		at Sacred Heart	W 55–53	22–8 (13–4)	William H. Pitt Center (608); Fairfield, CT
February 25, 2012; 11:00 am		at Quinnipiac	L 69–73	22–9 (13–5)	TD Bank Sports Center (3,163); Hamden, CT
NEC tournament
March 1, 2012; 7:00 pm	(3)	(6) Monmouth; Quarterfinals	W 87–68	23–9	Charles L. Sewall Center (2,079); Moon Township, PA
March 4, 2012; 12:00 pm, MSG/FCS	(3)	at (2) Wagner; Semifinals	W 71–64	24–9	Spiro Sports Center (1,705); Staten Island, NY
March 7, 2012; 7:00 pm, ESPN2	(3)	at (1) Long Island; Championship Game	L 73–90	24–10	Athletic, Recreation & Wellness Center (1,700); Brooklyn, NY
CollegeInsider.com tournament
March 13, 2012*; 7:00 pm		at Indiana State; First Round	W 67–60	25–10	Hulman Center (2,113); Terre Haute, IN
March 17, 2012*; 2:00 pm		at Toledo; Second Round	W 69–51	26–10	Savage Arena (1,321); Toledo, OH
March 21, 2012*; 7:00 pm		at Fairfield; Quarterfinals	L 61–67	26–11	Alumni Hall (1,407); Fairfield, CT
*Non-conference game. ^{#}Rankings from AP Poll. (#) Tournament seedings in parentheses. All times are in Eastern Time.
