= Dave Bike =

American basketball coach

Biographical details
- Born: March 14, 1946 (age 80); Bridgeport, Connecticut, U.S.

Coaching career (HC unless noted)
- 1965–1967: Sacred Heart (asst.)
- 1974–1978: Seattle (asst.)
- 1978–2013: Sacred Heart

Head coaching record
- Overall: 528–500

Accomplishments and honors

Championships
- NCAA Division II Tournament championship (1986)

Dave Bike (born March 14, 1946) was the former men's head basketball coach at Sacred Heart University. He led the Pioneers to a Division II national championship in 1986, and oversaw the transition of the program to the Division I level. He retired on May 30, 2013, after a 35-year career.
