= Justin Rutty =

American basketball player (born 1989)

Personal information
- Born: July 6, 1989 (age 37) Newburgh, New York, U.S.
- Listed height: 6 ft 7 in (2.01 m)
- Listed weight: 255 lb (116 kg)

Career information
- High school: Newburgh Free Academy (Newburgh, New York)
- College: Quinnipiac (2007–2011)
- NBA draft: 2011: undrafted
- Playing career: 2011–2017
- Position: Power forward

Career history
- 2011–2012: Atlético Aguada
- 2012–2013: BBC Nyon
- 2013: Boulazac
- 2013–2014: Starwings Basel
- 2014: Maratonistas de Coamo
- 2014: JSA Bordeaux
- 2015–2016: Avenir Basket Berck
- 2016–2017: Unión Atlético Montevideo

Career highlights
- Swiss LNBA MVP (2013); Northeast Conference Player of the Year (2010); AP honorable mention All-American (2010); 3x First-team All-NEC (2009–2011)

Justin Rutty (born July 6, 1989) is an American former basketball player. He is best known for his college career, where he was an All-American and Northeast Conference Player of the Year at Quinnipiac University.

== College career ==
Rutty was born in Newburgh, New York and starred as a high school player at Newburgh Free Academy. He then moved to Quinnipiac where he became one of the top players in the Northeast Conference (NEC). After leading the conference in field goal percentage as a freshman, Rutty had a breakout year in 2008–09, averaging 14.8 points and 9.8 rebounds per game and earning first team All-NEC honors. In his junior campaign, Rutty improved his output to 15.3 points and 10.9 rebounds per game. He led the Bobcats to the final of the 2010 NEC tournament and was individually recognized as the NEC Player of the Year and as an honorable mention All-American by the Associated Press. In his senior season, Rutty enjoyed another strong year statistically (14.5 points and 9.4 rebounds per game), but suffered an elbow injury midseason which caused him to miss several games. He was still named to first team All-NEC, though he failed in his bid to win back to back NEC Player or the Year honors (Central Connecticut's Ken Horton was the winner).

Bill Cloutier wrote in the New Haven Register during Rutty's final college season that he "may go down as the most important basketball player in the history of the school."

== Professional career ==
Following his college career, Rutty was not drafted in the 2011 NBA draft. He instead moved to Uruguay where he signed with Atlético Aguada. Rutty played well for the club, averaging 16 points and 7 rebounds until being sidelined with a back injury. For the 2012–13 season, Rutty moved to BBC Nyon of the Swiss Ligue Nationale de Basketball. He flourished there, averaging a 20.8 points and 11.4 rebounds and earning league MVP honors.

For the 2013–14 season, Rutty signed with Boulazac of the French LNB Pro B.
