= Jamal Olasewere =

Nigerian-American professional basketball player

Personal information
- Born: September 16, 1991 (age 35) Silver Spring, Maryland, U.S.
- Listed height: 6 ft 7 in (2.01 m)
- Listed weight: 225 lb (102 kg)

Career information
- High school: Springbrook (Silver Spring, Maryland)
- College: LIU Brooklyn (2009–2013)
- NBA draft: 2013: undrafted
- Playing career: 2014–2021
- Position: Small forward / power forward

Career history
- 2014–2015: Wolves Verviers-Pepinster
- 2015–2016: Virtus Roma
- 2016–2017: Hapoel Ramat Gan
- 2017: Orzi Basket
- 2017–2018: NPC Rieti
- 2017–2018: Blu Basket
- 2019–2020: Grindavík
- 2020–2021: Eurobasket Roma

Career highlights
- AP Honorable mention All-American (2013); NEC Player of the Year (2013); 2× First-team All-NEC (2012, 2013); NEC tournament MVP (2011)
Medals
Men's basketball
Representing Nigeria
FIBA Africa Championship
Gold medal – first place	2015 Tunisia	National Team

Jamal Olasewere (born September 16, 1991) is a Nigerian-American former professional basketball player. He completed his college career at Long Island University, where he was an All-American and Conference Player of the Year.

== College career ==
Olasewere, a 6'7" forward from Silver Spring, Maryland attended Springbrook High School and chose Long Island for college. There, he was a four-year starter and led the Blackbirds to three consecutive NCAA tournament bids from 2011 to 2013. As a senior, Olasewere averaged 18.9 points and 8.6 rebounds per game and was named Northeast Conference player of the year and an honorable mention All-American by the Associated Press. For his career, Olasewere scored a school-record 1,871 points and collected 964 rebounds.

== Professional career ==
In August 2013, Olasewere signed a one-year deal with the Italian League club Vanoli Cremona.

In August 2019, he signed with Úrvalsdeild karla club Grindavík. On January 9, 2020, the team released him from his contract due to injuries. In 10 games, he averaged 18 points and 7 rebounds per game.

On July 5, 2020, he has signed with Eurobasket Roma of the Italian Serie A2. Olasewere averaged 15.8 points, 6.4 rebounds, and 1.5 assists per game. On August 17, 2021, he signed with Pistoia Basket 2000, but never played a game for the team.

== Nigerian national team ==
Olasewere has also been a member of the senior men's Nigerian national basketball team. He played at the 2015 FIBA Africa Championship where they won the championship.
