= List of Stony Brook Seawolves men's basketball seasons =

This is a list of seasons completed by the Stony Brook Seawolves men's basketball team since the team's formation in 1960. The team originally competed at the Division III before being elevated to Division I in 1999. Stony Brook reached the NCAA Tournament for the first time in 2016.

== Season-by-season results ==
Statistics overview
Season	Coach	Overall	Conference	Standing	Postseason
Dan Farrell (Independent) (1960–1964)
1960–61	Dan Farrell	0–8			
1961–62	Dan Farrell	2–8			
1962–63	Dan Farrell	4–6			
1963–64	Dan Farrell	6–7			
Herb Brown (Independent/Knickerbocker) (1964–1969)
1964–65	Herb Brown	6–9			
1965–66	Herb Brown	5–14			
1966–67	Herb Brown	9–10			
1967–68	Herb Brown	7–15	3–4		
1968–69	Herb Brown	16–9	7–2		
1968–69	Herb Brown	16–9	7–2		
1969–70	Herb Brown	16–9	7–2		
Rollie Massimino (Knickerbocker) (1969–1971)
1969–70	Rollie Massimino	18–6	8–0		
1970–71	Rollie Massimino	15–10	7–2		
Don Covaleski (Knickerbocker) (1971–1974)
1971–72	Don Covaleski	16–10	7–1		
1972–73	Don Covaleski	10–11	6–2		
1973–74	Don Covaleski	12–10	7–1		
Dr. Ron Bash (Knickerbocker) (1974–1978)
1974–75	Ron Bash	2–22	2–6		
1975–76	Ron Bash	15–11	7–1		
1976–77	Ron Bash	21–6	7–2		
1977–78	Ron Bash	27–4	5–2		
1978–79	Ron Bash	24–3			
Dick Kendall (Independent) (1978–1984)
1979–80	Dick Kendall	19–9			
1980–81	Dick Kendall	16–12			
1981–82	Dick Kendall	10–15			
1982–83	Dick Kendall	13–12			
1983–84	Dick Kendall	11–14			
1984–85	Joe Castigle	16–11			
Joe Castigle (Independent/Skyline) (1984–1991)
1984–85	Joe Castigle	16–11			
1985–86	Joe Castigle	20–8			
1986–87	Joe Castigle	21–6			
1987–88	Joe Castigle	18–10			
1988–89	Joe Castigle	16–12			
1989–90	Joe Castigle	24–5	4–0		
1990–91	Joe Castigle	23–4	9–1		
Bernard Tomlin (Skyline/NECC) (1991–1999)
1991–92	Bernard Tomlin	17–10	7–3		
1992–93	Bernard Tomlin	16–12	6–4		
1993–94	Bernard Tomlin	12–12	6–4		
1994–95	Bernard Tomlin	13–13			
1995–96	Bernard Tomlin	9–17	6–14		
1996–97	Bernard Tomlin	10–16	6–12		
1997–98	Bernard Tomlin	13–13	10–6		
1998–99	Bernard Tomlin	11–16	10–8		
Nick Macarchuk (Independent/America East) (1999–2005)
1999–2000	Nick Macarchuk	6–23			
2000–01	Nick Macarchuk	17–11			
2001–02	Nick Macarchuk	6–22	5–11	9th	
2002–03	Nick Macarchuk	13–15	7–9	7th	
2003–04	Nick Macarchuk	10–20	5–13	7th	
2004–05	Nick Macarchuk	12–17	6–12	7th	
Steve Pikiell (America East) (2005–2016)
2005–06	Steve Pikiell	4–24	2–14	9th	
2006–07	Steve Pikiell	9–20	4–12	9th	
2007–08	Steve Pikiell	7–23	3–13	9th	
2008–09	Steve Pikiell	16–14	8–8	4th	
2009–10	Steve Pikiell	22–10	13–3	1st	NIT first round
2010–11	Steve Pikiell	15–17	8–8	5th	
2011–12	Steve Pikiell	22–10	14–2	1st	NIT first round
2012–13	Steve Pikiell	25–8	14–2	1st	NIT second round
2013–14	Steve Pikiell	23–9	13–3	2nd	CBI first round
2014–15	Steve Pikiell	23–12	12–4	2nd	CBI first round
2015–16	Steve Pikiell	26–7	14–2	1st	NCAA Tournament first round
Jeff Boals (America East) (2016–2019)
2016–17	Jeff Boals	18–14	12–4	2nd	CBI first round
2017–18	Jeff Boals	13–19	7–9	5th	
2018–19	Jeff Boals; Geno Ford	24–9	12–4	2nd	CBI first round
Geno Ford (America East) (2019–2022)
2019–20	Geno Ford	20–13	10–6	2nd	
2020–21	Geno Ford	9–14	7–9	7th	
2021–22	Geno Ford	18–13	10–8	T–3rd	
Geno Ford (Colonial Athletic Association) (2022–present)
2022–23	Geno Ford	11–22	6–12	10th	
2023–24	Geno Ford	20–15	10–8	T–6th	
2024–25	Geno Ford	8–24	4–14	13th	
2025–26	Geno Ford	17–15	9–9	T–7th	
Total:		793–758 (.511)			
National champion Postseason invitational champion Conference regular season champion Conference regular season and conference tournament champion Division regular season champion Division regular season and conference tournament champion Conference tournament champion
