= Steve Pikiell =

American basketball coach (born 1967)

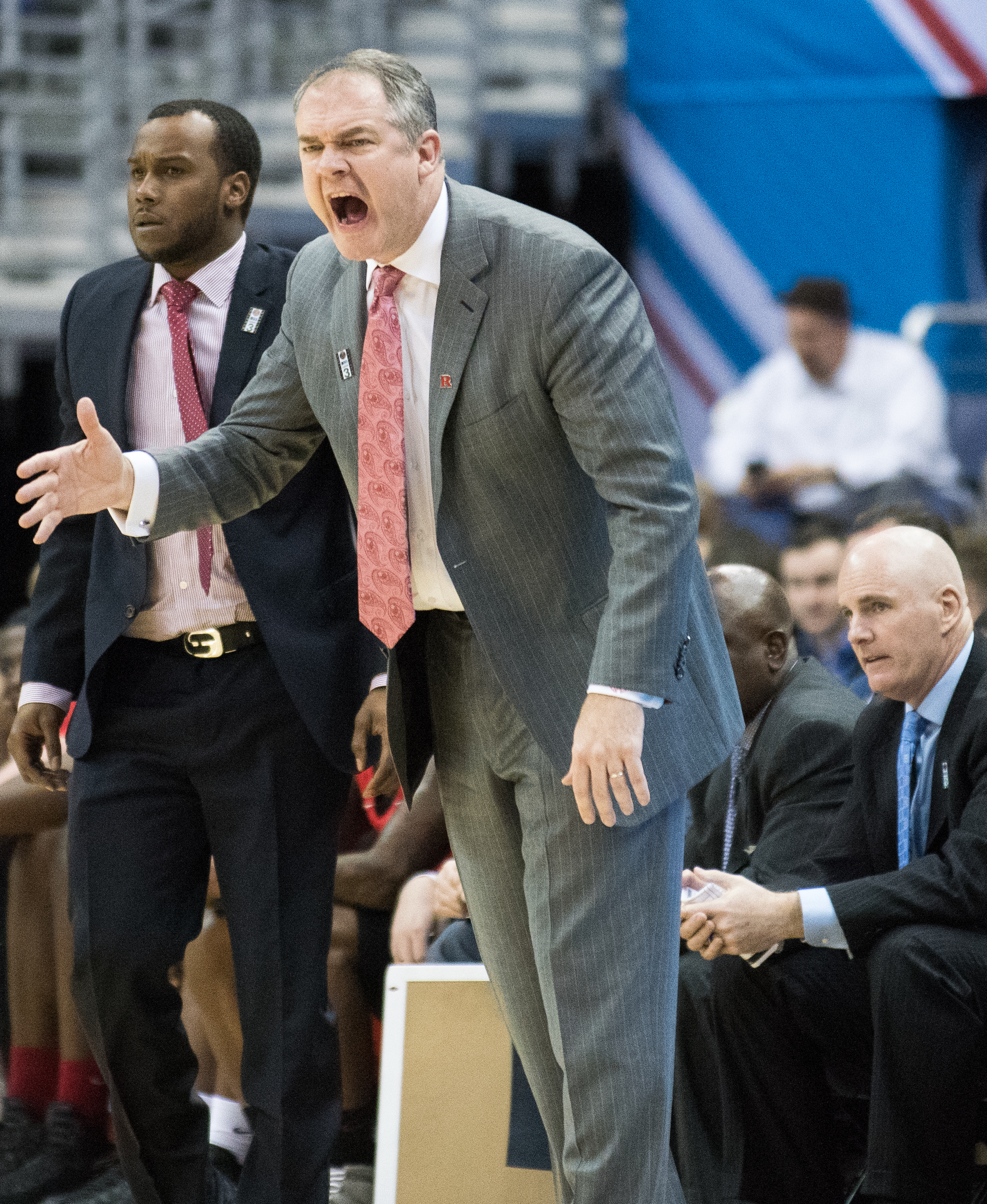
- Pikiell shouting while coaching Rutgers in 2017

Current position
- Title: Head coach
- Team: Rutgers
- Conference: Big Ten
- Record: 165–162 (.505)
- Annual salary: $2.6 million

Biographical details
- Born: November 21, 1967 (age 58); Bristol, Connecticut, U.S.
- Education: Connecticut

Playing career
- 1987–1991: UConn
- Position: Point guard

Coaching career (HC unless noted)
- 1991–1992: UConn (assistant)
- 1992: New Haven Skyhawks (assistant)
- 1993–1995: Yale (assistant)
- 1995–1996: Wesleyan (interim HC)
- 1997–2001: Central Connecticut (assistant)
- 2001–2005: George Washington (assistant)
- 2005–2016: Stony Brook
- 2016–present: Rutgers

Head coaching record
- Overall: 362–336 (.519)
- Tournaments: 1–3 (NCAA Division I); 1–4 (NIT); 0–2 (CBI); 0–1 (CBC)

Accomplishments and honors

Championships
- 4 America East regular season (2010, 2012, 2013, 2016); America East tournament (2016)

Awards
- Jim Phelan Award (2020); 4× America East Coach of the Year (2010, 2012, 2013, 2016)

Stephen Christopher Pikiell (/ˈpaɪkəl/ PYKE-əl; born November 21, 1967) is an American college basketball coach, currently the Scarlet Knights men's basketball head basketball coach at Rutgers University. He was previously the head coach at Stony Brook University from 2005 to 2016, leading the Seawolves to their first NCAA tournament appearance in his final year. Pikiell was hired by Rutgers in 2016 and led the program to its first NCAA tournament appearance in 30 years in 2021.

== Early years and playing career ==
Pikiell was born and raised in Bristol, Connecticut, and was one of nine children. He graduated from St. Paul Catholic High School in Bristol in 1986. At the University of Connecticut, Pikiell was a point guard, two-year captain and four-year letter-winner for the UConn Huskies from 1987 to 1991. He played in 106 career games and averaged 8.2 points a game as a freshman. Pikiell was the team captain on the 1989–90 team that won their first Big East Conference title and advanced to the Elite Eight. The next season, his 1990–91 team advanced to the Sweet Sixteen. In 1991, Pikiell was given the UConn Club Senior Athlete Award for outstanding athletic contributions.

== Coaching career ==
After graduation, Pikiell stayed on as an assistant for the UConn staff before moving on to Yale University as an assistant coach from 1992 to 1995. During the 1995-96 season, Pikiell served as the interim head coach at Wesleyan University. His former coach and colleague Howie Dickenman then became the head coach for the Central Connecticut State Blue Devils and hired Pikiell as an assistant coach. He remained from 1997 to 2001, with the Blue Devils reaching the NCAA Tournament in 2000. Pikiell joined fellow UConn alum Karl Hobbs as an assistant for the George Washington Colonials from 2001 to 2005, where he was part of the Colonials teams that made the 2004 NIT and 2005 NCAA tournament squads.

=== Stony Brook ===
On April 13, 2005, Pikiell replaced Nick Macarchuk as the 10th head coach in program history. At the time, Pikiell became the first Connecticut alum who played for Calhoun to coach a Division I program.

Taking over a program that transitioned to Division I in 1999, Stony Brook endured three-straight losing seasons in his first three years. In the 2008–09 season, the Seawolves went 16–14 for its first winning season as a Division I program. The following year in 2009–10, Stony Brook earned their first regular season championship with a 22–10, 13–3 record, ending with a semifinal loss in the tournament. By virtue of winning the regular season, Stony Brook earned an NIT bid but lost to Illinois. Pikiell guided the Seawolves to a 15–17 mark in 2010–11, making a run to the America East Championship game after an upset over top-seeded Vermont in the semifinals, but lost to Boston on a last-second foul.

From 2011 to 2016, Stony Brook won three America East regular season titles, while winning the conference tournament for the first time in school history in 2016 en route to the Seawolves' first NCAA tournament appearance. In that span, Stony Brook went 117–47, while appearing in two NIT and two CBI tournaments in addition to the NCAA Tournament appearance. His overall record at Stony Brook was 192–155 in 11 seasons.

=== Rutgers ===
On March 19, 2016, Pikiell was announced as the next coach at Rutgers University. During the 2019–20 season, Pikiell led Rutgers to a 20–11 overall record and 11–9 in the Big Ten Conference. He earned the Jim Phelan Award for national coach of the year from Colleginsiders.com.

On March 14, 2021, Pikiell's Rutgers team was named to the NCAA tournament for the first time since the 1990–91 season. The Scarlet Knights earned a 10 seed in the tournament. On March 19, 2021, Rutgers won its first NCAA tournament game in 38 years, beating Clemson 60–56. This was also Pikiell's first win as a coach in the NCAA tournament.

== Head coaching record ==
Record table
| Season | Team | Overall | Conference | Standing | Postseason |
|---|---|---|---|---|---|
Wesleyan Cardinals (New England Small College Athletic Conference) (1995–1996)
| 1995–96 | Wesleyan | 5–18 | | | |
| Wesleyan: | | 5–18 (.217) | | | |
Stony Brook Seawolves (America East Conference) (2005–2016)
| 2005–06 | Stony Brook | 4–24 | 2–14 | 9th | |
| 2006–07 | Stony Brook | 9–20 | 4–12 | 9th | |
| 2007–08 | Stony Brook | 7–23 | 3–13 | 8th | |
| 2008–09 | Stony Brook | 16–14 | 8–8 | 5th | |
| 2009–10 | Stony Brook | 22–10 | 13–3 | 1st | NIT first round |
| 2010–11 | Stony Brook | 15–17 | 8–8 | 5th | |
| 2011–12 | Stony Brook | 22–10 | 14–2 | 1st | NIT first round |
| 2012–13 | Stony Brook | 25–8 | 14–2 | 1st | NIT second round |
| 2013–14 | Stony Brook | 23–11 | 13–3 | 2nd | CBI first round |
| 2014–15 | Stony Brook | 23–12 | 12–4 | T–2nd | CBI first round |
| 2015–16 | Stony Brook | 26–7 | 14–2 | 1st | NCAA Division I Round of 64 |
| Stony Brook: | | 192–156 (.552) | 109–71 (.606) | | |
Rutgers Scarlet Knights (Big Ten Conference) (2016–present)
| 2016–17 | Rutgers | 15–18 | 3–15 | 14th | |
| 2017–18 | Rutgers | 15–19 | 3–15 | 14th | |
| 2018–19 | Rutgers | 14–17 | 7–13 | T–10th | |
| 2019–20 | Rutgers | 20–11 | 11–9 | T–5th | NCAA Division I Canceled |
| 2020–21 | Rutgers | 16–12 | 10–10 | T–6th | NCAA Division I Round of 32 |
| 2021–22 | Rutgers | 18–14 | 12–8 | T–4th | NCAA Division I First Four |
| 2022–23 | Rutgers | 19–15 | 10–10 | T–9th | NIT First Round |
| 2023–24 | Rutgers | 15–17 | 7–13 | T–12th | |
| 2024–25 | Rutgers | 15–17 | 8–12 | 11th | |
| 2025–26 | Rutgers | 14–20 | 6–14 | 14th | CBC Quarterfinals |
| 2026–27 | Rutgers | 4–2 | 0–0 | | |
| Rutgers: | | 165–162 (.505) | 77–119 (.393) | | |
| Total: | | 362–336 (.519) | | | |
National champion Postseason invitational champion Conference regular season champion Conference regular season and conference tournament champion Division regular season champion Division regular season and conference tournament champion Conference tournament champion
