= 2010–11 UMBC Retrievers men's basketball team =

American college basketball season

2010–11 UMBC Retrievers men's basketball
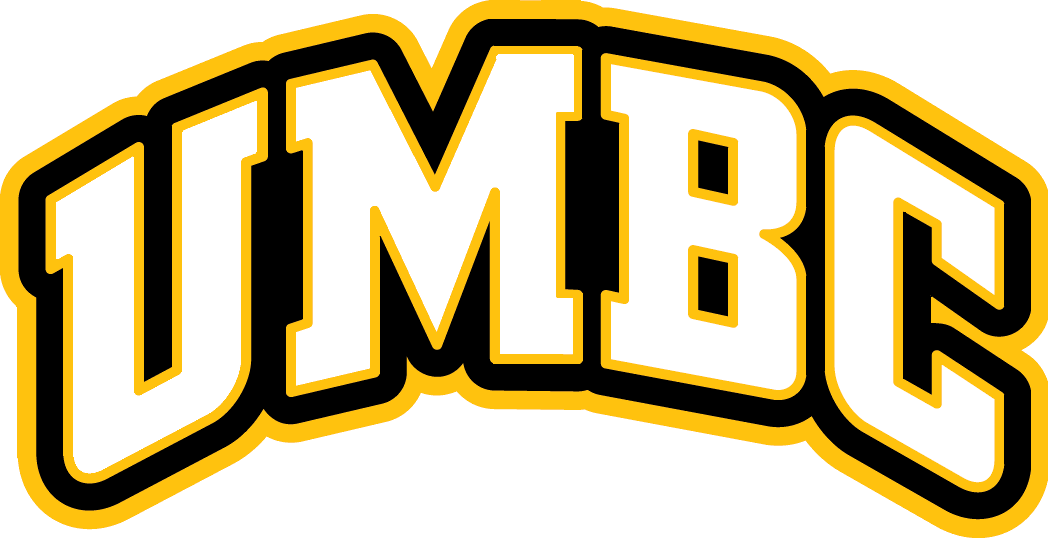
- Conference: America East Conference
- Record: 5–25 (4–12 AEC)
- Head coach: Randy Monroe (7th season)
- Home arena: UMBC Event Center

2010–11 America East men's basketball standings
	Conf.				Overall
Team	W		L	PCT	W		L	PCT
Vermont	13	–	3	.813	23	–	9	.719
Boston University†	12	–	4	.750	21	–	14	.600
Maine	9	–	7	.563	15	–	15	.500
Albany	9	–	7	.563	16	–	16	.500
Stony Brook	8	–	8	.500	15	–	17	.469
Hartford	7	–	9	.438	11	–	20	.355
New Hampshire	6	–	10	.375	12	–	18	.400
Binghamton	4	–	12	.250	8	–	23	.258
UMBC	4	–	12	.250	5	–	25	.167
† 2011 America East tournament winner As of March 18, 2011; Rankings from AP Poll

The 2010–11 UMBC Retrievers men's basketball team represented University of Maryland, Baltimore County in the 2010–11 NCAA Division I men's basketball season. The team played in the America East Conference (AEC) and was led by head coach Randy Monroe, in his seventh year. The Retrievers finished with a record of 5–25, 4–12 in the America East. The Retrievers were eliminated in the first round of the America East tournament by Binghamton, 91–65.

== Schedule ==
Date time, TV	Rank^{#}	Opponent^{#}	Result	Record	Site city, state
Regular season
November 14, 2010*		VMI	L 77–94	0–1	Retriever Activities Center (1,910); Catonsville, MD
November 17, 2010*		at Loyola (MD)	L 72–83	0–2	Reitz Arena (859); Baltimore, MD
November 20, 2010*; 7:00 pm		Central Connecticut	L 74–82	0–3	Retriever Activities Center (1,372); Catonsville, MD
November 23, 2010*		at Coppin State	L 69–71 ^{OT}	0–4	Physical Education Complex (418); Baltimore, MD
November 27, 2010*		at Duquesne	L 69–101	0–5	A.J. Palumbo Center (2,015); Pittsburgh, PA
November 30, 2010*; 7:00 pm		at Penn	L 59–71	0–6	Palestra (1,555); Philadelphia, PA
December 3, 2010*		at No. 7 Connecticut	L 61–94	0–7	XL Center (10,591); Hartford, CT
December 8, 2010*		at Rider	L 39–81	0–8	Alumni Gymnasium (1,608); Lawrenceville, NJ
December 11, 2010*		Towson	L 77–86	0–9	Retriever Activities Center (1,952); Catonsville, MD
December 14, 2010*; 7:30 pm		American	L 53–66	0–10	Retriever Activities Center; Catonsville, MD
December 18, 2010*		at Morgan State	L 62–75	0–11	Talmadge L. Hill Field House (479); Baltimore, MD
December 22, 2010*		at No. 22 Notre Dame	L 53–93	0–12	Joyce Center (6,265); South Bend, IN
December 30, 2010*		Niagara	W 68–67	1–12	Retriever Activities Center (1,466); Catonsville, MD
January 2, 2011		Stony Brook	L 56–64	1–13 (0–1)	Retriever Activities Center (1,216); Catonsville, MD
January 8, 2011; 2:00 pm		Maine	L 67–82	1–14 (0–2)	Retriever Activities Center (1,356); Catonsville, MD
January 12, 2011		at Stony Brook	L 75–83	1–15 (0–3)	Binghamton University Events Center (4,206); Vestal, NY
January 15, 2011		at Vermont	L 48–85	1–16 (0–4)	Patrick Gym (2,479); Burlington, VT
January 17, 2011		Boston University	W 71–67	2–16 (1–4)	Retriever Activities Center (1,237); Catonsville, MD
January 20, 2011		at Hartford	W 74–70 ^{2OT}	3–16 (2–4)	Chase Arena at Reich Family Pavilion (1,129); West Hartford, CT
January 23, 2011; 1:00 pm		at New Hampshire	L 60–80	3–17 (2–5)	Lundholm Gym (590); Durham, NH
January 26, 2011		Albany	L 63–66	3–18 (2–6)	Retriever Activities Center (607); Catonsville, MD
January 31, 2011		at Stony Brook	L 59–69	3–19 (2–7)	Pritchard Gymnasium (1,255); Stony Brook, NY
February 3, 2011		Binghamton	W 83–79	4–19 (3–7)	Retriever Activities Center (2,108); Catonsville, MD
February 6, 2011; 2:00 pm		at Maine	W 84–79	5–19 (4–7)	Alfond Arena (1,712); Orono, ME
February 9, 2011		Vermont	L 67–80	5–20 (4–8)	Retriever Activities Center (1,285); Catonsville, MD
February 12, 2011; 7:00 pm		New Hampshire	L 46–63	5–21 (4–9)	Retriever Activities Center (2,216); Catonsville, MD
February 15 2011		at Boston University	L 53–85	5–22 (4–10)	Agganis Arena (608); Boston, MA
February 19, 2011		Hartford	L 57–64	5–23 (4–11)	Retriever Activities Center (2,066); Catonsville, MD
February 23, 2011		Albany	L 67–83	5–24 (4–12)	SEFCU Arena (2,638); Albany, NY
America East tournament
March 3, 2011	(8)	vs. No. 9 Binghamton; America East First Round	L 65–91	5–25	Chase Arena at Reich Family Pavilion (1,069); West Hartford, CT
*Non-conference game. ^{#}Rankings from AP Poll. (#) Tournament seedings in parentheses. All times are in Eastern Time. Source
