= 2011 America East men's basketball tournament =

- 2011 America East tournament logo
- Classification: Division I
- Season: 2010–11
- First round site: Chase Arena at Reich Family Pavilion; West Hartford, CT
- Quarterfinals site: Chase Arena at Reich Family Pavilion; West Hartford, CT
- Semifinals site: Chase Arena at Reich Family Pavilion; West Hartford, CT
- Finals site: Agganis Arena; Boston, MA
- Champions: Boston University (6th title)
- Winning coach: Patrick Chambers (1st title)
- MVP: John Holland (Boston University)

2010–11 America East men's basketball standings
	Conf.				Overall
Team	W		L	PCT	W		L	PCT
Vermont	13	–	3	.813	23	–	9	.719
Boston University†	12	–	4	.750	21	–	14	.600
Maine	9	–	7	.563	15	–	15	.500
Albany	9	–	7	.563	16	–	16	.500
Stony Brook	8	–	8	.500	15	–	17	.469
Hartford	7	–	9	.438	11	–	20	.355
New Hampshire	6	–	10	.375	12	–	18	.400
Binghamton	4	–	12	.250	8	–	23	.258
UMBC	4	–	12	.250	5	–	25	.167
† 2011 America East tournament winner As of March 18, 2011; Rankings from AP Poll

The 2011 America East men's basketball tournament was held from March 3–6, 2011 at the Chase Arena at Reich Family Pavilion in West Hartford, Connecticut. The tournament final was held on March 12 at Agganis Arena. Boston University, the highest remaining seed, defeated Stony Brook by a score of 56–54 to win its sixth America East men's basketball title. Boston U also earned an automatic bid into the 2011 NCAA tournament, where it lost in the first round to number one seed Kansas.

== Bracket and Results ==
First round Thursday, March 3
8	UMBC	65
9	Binghamton	91

Quarterfinals; Saturday, March 5
1	Vermont	57
9	Binghamton	46
4	Albany	61
5	Stony Brook	67
2	Boston University	69
7	New Hampshire	60
3	Maine	63
6	Hartford	66

Semifinals; Sunday, March 6
1	Vermont	47
5	Stony Brook	69
2	Boston University	55
6	Hartford	49

Championship Game; Saturday, March 12
5	Stony Brook	54
2	Boston University	56

== Recap ==
=== Opening-Round ===
- Binghamton vs UMBC: Binghamton played an impressive opening round game against UMBC in which the team made 17 three-pointers, breaking the record for the most three's in the America East tournament. Binghamton took the lead early on in the game and kept a point deferential of at least 12 points for most of the game, they went on to win by 91–65 score with a 51% FG percentage, 53% from the arc. Greer Wright led the game with 31 points, while Laurence Jolicoeur led UMBC with 11.

=== Quarter-finals ===
- Stony Brook vs Albany:
- Vermont vs Binghamton:
- Boston.U vs New Hampshire:
- Hartford vs Maine:

== See also ==
- America East Conference
