= 2010–11 Boston University Terriers men's basketball team =

American college basketball season

2010–11 Boston University Terriers men's basketball

America East tournament champions

NCAA tournament, Round of 64
- Conference: America East Conference
- Record: 21–14 (12–4 America East)
- Head coach: Pat Chambers (2nd season)
- Assistant coach: Brian Daly
- Home arena: Case Gym

2010–11 America East men's basketball standings
	Conf.				Overall
Team	W		L	PCT	W		L	PCT
Vermont	13	–	3	.813	23	–	9	.719
Boston University†	12	–	4	.750	21	–	14	.600
Maine	9	–	7	.563	15	–	15	.500
Albany	9	–	7	.563	16	–	16	.500
Stony Brook	8	–	8	.500	15	–	17	.469
Hartford	7	–	9	.438	11	–	20	.355
New Hampshire	6	–	10	.375	12	–	18	.400
Binghamton	4	–	12	.250	8	–	23	.258
UMBC	4	–	12	.250	5	–	25	.167
† 2011 America East tournament winner As of March 18, 2011; Rankings from AP Poll

The 2010–11 Boston University Terriers men's basketball team represented Boston University during the 2010–11 NCAA Division I men's basketball season. The Terriers, led by second year head coach Pat Chambers, played their home games at Case Gym and were members of the America East Conference. After finishing second in the conference regular season standings, the Terriers won the 2011 America East tournament to earn an automatic bid to the NCAA tournament. As No. 16 seed in the Southwest region, Boston University was beaten by No. 1 seed Kansas in the Round of 64. The Terriers finished the season 21–14 (12–4 America East).

== Roster ==
2010–11 Boston University Terriers men's basketball team
Players
Coaches

Pos.	#	Name	Height	Weight	Year	Hometown
G	1	Darryl Partin	6 ft 6 in (1.98 m)	190 lb (86 kg)	Jr	Seattle, Washington
G	2	Matt Griffin	5 ft 10 in (1.78 m)	180 lb (82 kg)	Jr	Narberth, Pennsylvania
G	13	D. J. Irving	6 ft 0 in (1.83 m)	165 lb (75 kg)	Fr	Chester, Pennsylvania
G/F	23	John Holland	6 ft 5 in (1.96 m)	205 lb (93 kg)	Sr	Bronx, New York
F	25	Patrick Hazel	6 ft 6 in (1.98 m)	220 lb (100 kg)	Jr	Jamaica, New York

Head coach

- Pat Chambers (Philadelphia)

Assistant coach(es)

Legend

- (C) Team captain
- (S) Suspended
- (I) Ineligible
- (W) Walk-on
- Injured
- Current redshirt

Roster

== Schedule and results ==
Date time, TV	Rank^{#}	Opponent^{#}	Result	Record	Site (attendance) city, state
Regular season
November 12, 2010*		at Northeastern	L 64–66	0–1	Matthews Arena (2,339); Boston, MA
November 16, 2010*		vs. George Washington; NIT Season Tip-Off	W 76–67	1–1	The Pavilion (6,500); Philadelphia, PA
November 17, 2010*		at No. 6 Villanova; NIT Season Tip-Off	L 66–82	1–2	The Pavilion (6,500); Philadelphia, PA
November 19, 2010*		Marist	W 58–37	2–2	Case Gym (947); Boston, MA
November 22, 2010*		vs. Hampton	L 50–51	2–3	Charles E. Smith Center (832); Washington, D.C.
November 23, 2010*		vs. Nevada	W 66–57	3–3	Charles E. Smith Center (532); Washington, D.C.
November 27, 2010*		Cornell	W 66–61	4–3	Case Gym (683); Boston, MA
November 30, 2010*		at No. 10 Kentucky	L 57–91	4–4	Rupp Arena (21,684); Lexington, KY
December 4, 2010*		at Bucknell	L 49–52	4–5	Sojka Pavilion (2,765); Lewisburg, PA
December 9, 2010*		La Salle	L 81–84	4–6	Agganis Arena (1,110); Boston, MA
December 11, 2010*		at Harvard	L 71–87	4–7	Lavietes Pavilion (1,487); Cambridge, MA
December 21, 2010*		Saint Joseph's	W 85–79	5–7	Agganis Arena (912); Boston, MA
December 29, 2010*		Quinnipiac	L 81–82	5–8	Case Gym (700); Boston, MA
December 31, 2010*		at UMass	L 54–71	5–9	Mullins Center (3,464); Amherst, MA
January 2, 2011		at Maine	L 52–65	5–10 (0–1)	Alfond Arena (1,224); Orono, ME
January 4, 2011		New Hampshire	W 61–54	6–10 (1–1)	Case Gym (401); Boston, MA
January 9, 2011		Vermont	W 74–65	7–10 (2–1)	Case Gym (683); Boston, MA
January 15, 2011		at Albany	W 70–67	8–10 (3–1)	SEFCU Arena (1,348); Albany, NY
January 17, 2011		at UMBC	L 67–71	8–11 (3–2)	RAC Arena (1,237); Catonsville, MD
January 20, 2011		Stony Brook	W 67–62	9–11 (4–2)	Case Gym (877); Boston, MA
January 22, 2011*		at Hartford	L 55–59	9–12 (4–3)	Chase Arena at Reich Family Pavilion (1,518); Hartford, CT
January 26, 2011*		Binghamton	W 71–66	10–12 (5–3)	Agganis Arena (546); Boston, MA
January 29, 2011		at New Hampshire	L 48–60	10–13 (5–4)	Lundholm Gym (1,364); Durham, NH
February 1, 2011		Maine	W 88–78	11–13 (6–4)	Agganis Arena (669); Boston, MA
February 4, 2011		at Stony Brook	W 62–49	12–13 (7–4)	Pritchard Gymnasium (1,630); Stony Brook, NY
February 10, 2011		vs. Albany; Big Apple Battle	W 63–44	13–13 (8–4)	Madison Square Garden (13,652); New York City, NY
February 12, 2011		Hartford	W 61–50	14–13 (9–4)	Case Gym (851); Boston, MA
February 15, 2011		UMBC	W 85–53	15–13 (10–4)	Agganis Arena (608); Boston, MA
February 19, 2011*		Canisius; ESPN BracketBusters	W 70–62	16–13	Agganis Arena (875); Boston, MA
February 24, 2011		at Binghamton	W 53–51	17–13 (11–4)	Events Center (3,776); Binghamton, NY
February 27, 2011		at Vermont	W 66–64 ^{OT}	18–13 (12–4)	Patrick Gym (3,266); Burlington, VT
America East tournament
March 5, 2011*	(2)	vs. (7) New Hampshire; Quarterfinals	W 69–60	19–13	Chase Arena at Reich Family Pavilion (1,969); West Hartford, CT
March 6, 2011*	(2)	vs. (6) Hartford; Semifinals	W 55–49	20–13	Chase Arena at Reich Family Pavilion (2,169); West Hartford, CT
March 12, 2011*	(2)	(5) Stony Brook; Championship Game	W 56–54	21–13	Agganis Arena (3,845); Boston, MA
2011 NCAA tournament
March 18, 2011*; TBS	(16 SW)	vs. (1 SW) No. 2 Kansas; Second Round	L 53–72	21–14	BOK Center (14,353); Tulsa, OK
*Non-conference game. ^{#}Rankings from AP Poll. (#) Tournament seedings in parentheses. SW=Southwest. All times are in Eastern Time.

== Awards and honors ==
- John Holland – America East Player of the Year
