= 2010–11 Connecticut Huskies men's basketball team =

American college basketball season

2010–11 Connecticut Huskies men's basketball

NCAA tournament National Champions Big East tournament champions Maui Invitational champions

National Championship Game, W 53–41 vs. Butler
- Conference: Big East Conference

Ranking
- Coaches: No. 1
- AP: No. 9
- Record: 32–9 (9–9 Big East)
- Head coach: Jim Calhoun (25th season)
- Assistant coaches: George Blaney; Andre LaFleur; Kevin Ollie
- Home arena: Harry A. Gampel Pavilion; XL Center

2010–11 Big East men's basketball standings
	Conf.				Overall
Team	W		L	PCT	W		L	PCT
No. 4 Pittsburgh	15	–	3	.833	28	–	6	.824
No. 5 Notre Dame	14	–	4	.778	27	–	7	.794
*No. 12 Syracuse	12	–	6	.667	27	–	8	.771
No. 14 Louisville	12	–	6	.667	25	–	10	.714
No. 18 St. John's	12	–	6	.667	21	–	12	.636
Cincinnati	11	–	7	.611	26	–	9	.743
No. 22 West Virginia	11	–	7	.611	21	–	12	.636
Georgetown	10	–	8	.556	21	–	11	.656
No. 9 Connecticut†	9	–	9	.500	32	–	9	.780
Villanova	9	–	9	.500	21	–	12	.636
Marquette	9	–	9	.500	22	–	15	.595
Seton Hall	7	–	11	.389	13	–	18	.419
Rutgers	5	–	13	.278	15	–	17	.469
Providence	4	–	14	.222	15	–	17	.469
South Florida	3	–	15	.167	10	–	23	.303
DePaul	1	–	17	.056	7	–	24	.226
† 2011 Big East tournament winner As of April 4, 2011; *Syracuse:: 7 wins vacated due to sanctions against the program; Disputed record: Syracuse–(27–8)(10–6); Rankings from AP Poll

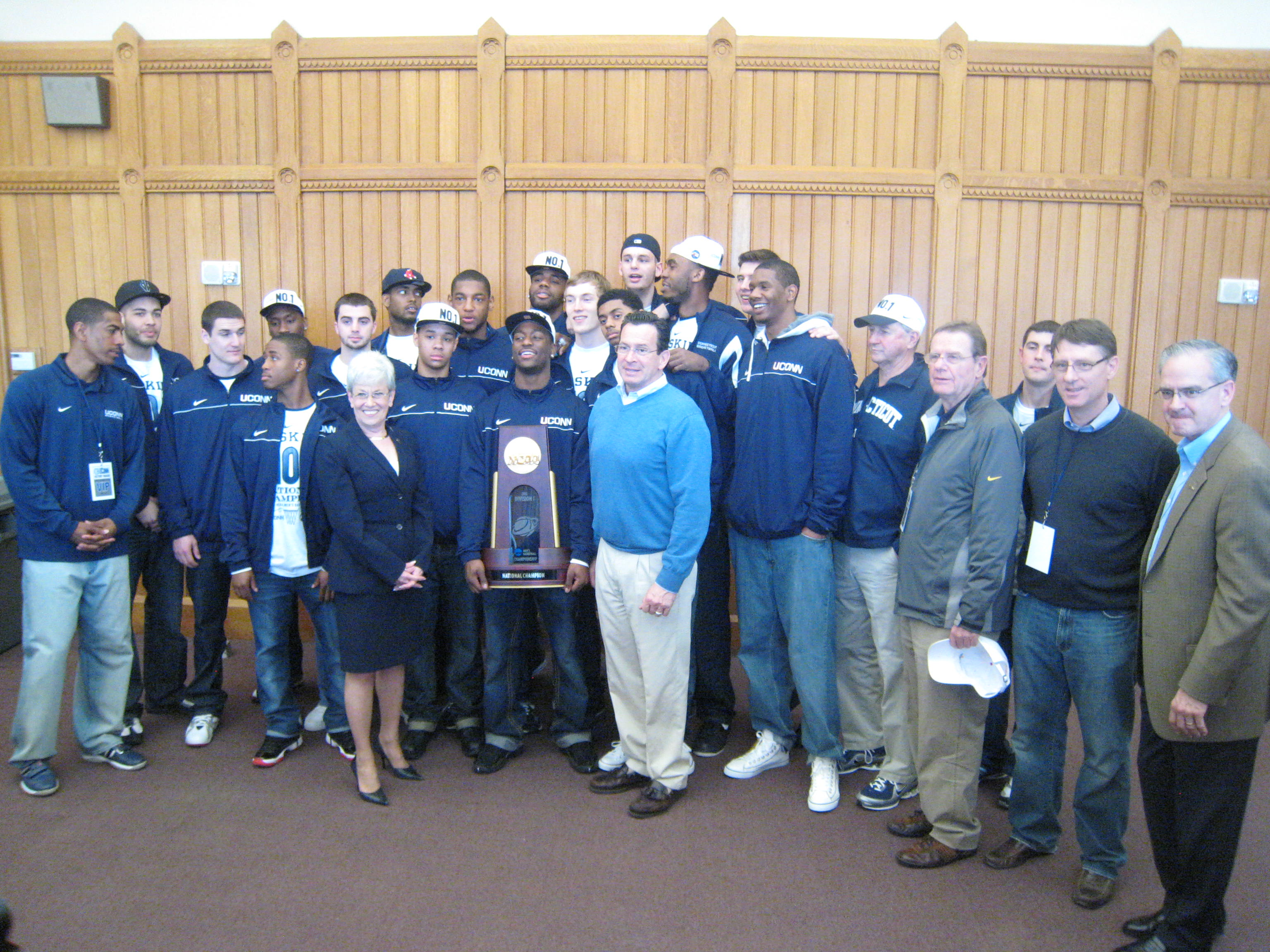
Players and coaches, joined by Connecticut Governor Dannel Malloy and Lieutenant Governor Nancy Wyman, pose with the championship trophy

The 2010–11 Connecticut Huskies men's basketball team represented the University of Connecticut in the 2010–2011 NCAA Division I basketball season. The Huskies were coached by Jim Calhoun and played their home games at the XL Center in Hartford, Connecticut, and on campus at the Harry A. Gampel Pavilion in Storrs, Connecticut. The Huskies were a member of the Big East Conference.

The Huskies entered the year unranked and picked to finish tenth in the Big East. In November, they won the Maui Invitational Tournament for the second time. They finished the Big East regular season in a tie for ninth place at 9–9. Led by Kemba Walker who scored a tournament record 130 points, they became the first school to win five conference tournament games in as many days in claiming their seventh Big East tournament title. By winning the tournament, they were awarded an automatic berth into the 2011 NCAA Division I men's basketball tournament. They advanced to their fourth Final Four with a 65–63 victory over Arizona and advanced to their third national championship game with a 56–55 victory over Kentucky and beat Butler 53–41 for their first championship since 2004 and third since 1999.

== Before the season ==
The Huskies were coming off of a tumultuous 2009–10 season in which they failed to earn a berth in the NCAA tournament for the second time in four years, and amidst an NCAA investigation into alleged recruiting violations involving Nate Miles. As a result of the investigation, assistant coaches Patrick Sellers and Beau Archibald resigned from their positions. Later that summer, Kevin Ollie was hired to take Sellers' role as assistant coach, and Glen Miller was brought on as Director of Basketball Operations, replacing Archibald. Both men have previous links with Jim Calhoun. Ollie played for the Huskies under Calhoun from 1991 to 1995, while Miller was an assistant coach under Calhoun from 1986 until 1992.
In addition to the coaching changes, the Huskies also needed to replace three graduating starters: Jerome Dyson, Stanley Robinson and Gavin Edwards. Reserve forward Ater Majok also left the school before the season began.
Prior to the start of the season, the Huskies were picked by both the Big East coaches and writers to finish tenth in the conference. The team was not ranked in the top 25 in any major national poll, although they did receive votes in the Preseason AP Poll.
With regards to individual honors, Kemba Walker was selected to the Preseason All Big East first team, and was named to both the Wooden and Naismith award preseason watchlists.

=== Recruiting class ===
College recruiting information
Name	Hometown	School	Height	Weight	Commit date
Michael Bradley; C	Chattanooga, TN	Tyner Academy	6 ft 10 in (2.08 m)	210 lb (95 kg)	Oct 13, 2009
Michael Bradley; C	Recruit ratings: Scout: Rivals: (88)				
Niels Giffey; SF	Berlin, Germany	Alba Berlin	6 ft 7 in (2.01 m)	210 lb (95 kg)	
Niels Giffey; SF	Recruit ratings: (40)				
Jeremy Lamb; SG	Norcross, GA	Norcross H.S.	6 ft 4 in (1.93 m)	175 lb (79 kg)	Sep 15, 2009
Jeremy Lamb; SG	Recruit ratings: Scout: Rivals: (92)				
Shabazz Napier; PG	Roxbury, MA	Lawrence Academy	5 ft 11 in (1.80 m)	165 lb (75 kg)	Apr 29, 2010
Shabazz Napier; PG	Recruit ratings: Scout: Rivals: (94)				
Tyler Olander; PF	Storrs, CT	E.O. Smith H.S.	6 ft 9 in (2.06 m)	215 lb (98 kg)	Mar 25, 2010
Tyler Olander; PF	Recruit ratings: Scout: Rivals: (90)				
Roscoe Smith; SF	Baltimore, MD	Oak Hill Academy (VA)	6 ft 8 in (2.03 m)	190 lb (86 kg)	Jan 8, 2010
Roscoe Smith; SF	Recruit ratings: Scout: Rivals: (95)				
Enosch Wolf; C	Germany	Wilbraham & Monson Academy	7 ft 1 in (2.16 m)	250 lb (110 kg)	
Enosch Wolf; C	Recruit ratings: (91)				
Overall recruit ranking: Scout: 18 ESPN: 20
Note: In many cases, Scout, Rivals, 247Sports, On3, and ESPN may conflict in their listings of height and weight.; In these cases, the average was taken. ESPN grades are on a 100-point scale.; Sources: "ESPN – Connecticut Basketball Recruiting 2010". ESPN.; "2010 Team Ranking". Rivals.

== Roster ==
2010–11 Connecticut Huskies men's basketball team
Players
Coaches

Pos.	#	Name	Height	Weight	Year	Hometown
G	21	Kyle Bailey	6 ft 3 in (1.91 m)	170 lb (77 kg)	Sr	Lancaster, NH
G	2	Donnell Beverly (C)	6 ft 4 in (1.93 m)	190 lb (86 kg)	Sr	Hawthorne, CA
F/C	25	Michael Bradley (redshirt)	6 ft 10 in (2.08 m)	235 lb (107 kg)	Fr	Chattanooga, TN
F	4	Jamal Coombs-McDaniel	6 ft 7 in (2.01 m)	210 lb (95 kg)	So	Dorchester, MA
G/F	5	Niels Giffey	6 ft 7 in (2.01 m)	210 lb (95 kg)	Fr	Berlin, Germany
G/F	3	Jeremy Lamb	6 ft 5 in (1.96 m)	185 lb (84 kg)	Fr	Norcross, GA
G	13	Shabazz Napier	6 ft 0 in (1.83 m)	170 lb (77 kg)	Fr	Roxbury, MA
F	10	Tyler Olander	6 ft 9 in (2.06 m)	225 lb (102 kg)	Fr	Mansfield, CT
C	35	Charles Okwandu	7 ft 0 in (2.13 m)	255 lb (116 kg)	Sr	Lagos, Nigeria
F/C	34	Alex Oriakhi	6 ft 9 in (2.06 m)	240 lb (109 kg)	So	Lowell, MA
F	22	Roscoe Smith	6 ft 8 in (2.03 m)	205 lb (93 kg)	Fr	Baltimore, MD
F	23	Benjamin Stewart	6 ft 5 in (1.96 m)	205 lb (93 kg)	So	Denver, CO
G	15	Kemba Walker (C)	6 ft 1 in (1.85 m)	172 lb (78 kg)	Jr	Bronx, NY
C	1	Enosch Wolf	7 ft 1 in (2.16 m)	260 lb (118 kg)	Fr	Göttingen, Germany

Head coach

- Jim Calhoun

Assistant coach(es)

- George Blaney
- Andre LaFleur
- Kevin Ollie

Legend

- (C) Team captain
- (S) Suspended
- (I) Ineligible
- (W) Walk-on
- Injured
- Current redshirt

Roster
Last update: January 23, 2010

== Regular season ==
After a pair of exhibition games, the Huskies began the regular season with non-conference wins over America East teams, Stony Brook and Vermont. In the win against Vermont, Kemba Walker tied a UConn XL Center record by scoring 42 points.
The team next travelled to Hawaii to play in the 2010 Maui Invitational Tournament. They last participated in the tournament in 2005, when they won the championship. To open the current tournament, they played Wichita State. Walker scored 29 of his 31 points in the second in the 83–79 win. The victory meant they would match up with Michigan State, who was ranked No. 2 in the AP poll at the time. Walker scored 30 points, the third straight game that he eclipsed the 30 point mark, as the Huskies won 70–67. In the championship game, the Huskies outscored Kentucky 21–2 at the end of the first half, and defeated the Wildcats, 84–67. Walker, who scored 29 points in the final, was named the tournament's Most Valuable Player. His 90 points was just three points short of the Maui Invitational record. Alex Oriakhi was also named to the all-tournament team.

== Postseason ==
The Huskies entered the Big East tournament as the No. 9 seed, just missing the cut to earn a First round bye. UConn went on to win five games in five consecutive days to earn the Tournament Championship, and an automatic bid into the NCAA tournament. In the Big East tournament, UConn defeated four teams ranked in the Associated Press Top 25.

UConn received a No. 3 seed in the NCAA Tournament's West Region. They continued their winning streak all the way to the National Championship, finishing the season with eleven consecutive wins. As a result of having to play 5 games to win their conference tournament, they became the first team in Division I history to play 41 games in a season.

== Schedule ==
Date time, TV	Rank^{#}	Opponent^{#}	Result	Record	Site (attendance) city, state
Exhibition
November 3*; 7:30 pm		American International	W 96–58	—	Harry A. Gampel Pavilion; Storrs, CT
November 7*; 1:00 pm		Bridgeport	W 103–57	—	XL Center; Hartford, CT
Regular Season
November 12*; 7:00 pm, SNY		Stony Brook	W 79–52	1–0	Harry A. Gampel Pavilion (8,319); Storrs, CT
November 17*; 7:00 pm, SNY		Vermont	W 89–73	2–0	XL Center (10,216); Hartford, CT
November 22*; 3:00 pm, ESPN2		vs. Wichita State; Maui Invitational Quarterfinal	W 83–79	3–0	Lahaina Civic Center (2,400); Lahaina, HI
November 23*; 7:00 pm, ESPN		vs. No. 2 Michigan State; Maui Invitational Semifinal	W 70–67	4–0	Lahaina Civic Center (2,400); Lahaina, HI
November 24*; 10:00 pm, ESPN		vs. No. 8 Kentucky; Maui Invitational Final	W 84–67	5–0	Lahaina Civic Center (2,400); Lahaina, HI
November 30*; 7:30 pm, SNY	No. 7	New Hampshire	W 62–55	6–0	Harry A. Gampel Pavilion (8,558); Storrs, CT
December 3*; 7:00 pm, SNY	No. 7	UMBC	W 94–61	7–0	XL Center (10,591); Hartford, CT
December 8*; 7:30 pm, SNY	No. 6	Fairleigh Dickinson	W 78–54	8–0	Harry A. Gampel Pavilion (8,241); Storrs, CT
December 20*; 7:00 pm, ESPNU	No. 4	Coppin State	W 76–64	9–0	XL Center (10,193); Hartford, CT
December 22*; 7:00 pm, SNY	No. 4	Harvard	W 81–52	10–0	XL Center (11,255); Hartford, CT
December 27; 8:30 pm, ESPN2	No. 4	at No. 6 Pittsburgh	L 63–78	10–1 (0–1)	Petersen Events Center (12,725); Pittsburgh, PA
December 31; 6:00 pm, ESPNU	No. 4	South Florida	W 66–61 ^{OT}	11–1 (1–1)	XL Center (12,599); Hartford, CT
January 4; 7:00 pm, SNY	No. 8	at No. 14 Notre Dame	L 70–73	11–2 (1–2)	Joyce Center (7,291); South Bend, IN
January 8*; 3:30 pm, ESPN	No. 8	at No. 12 Texas	W 82–81 ^{OT}	12–2	Frank Erwin Center (16,734); Austin, TX
January 11; 7:00 pm, SNY	No. 10	Rutgers	W 67–53	13–2 (2–2)	XL Center (12,527); Hartford, CT
January 15; 2:00 pm, SNY	No. 10	at DePaul	W 82–62	14–2 (3–2)	Allstate Arena (9,581); Rosemont, IL
January 17; 3:30 pm, ESPN	No. 8	No. 7 Villanova	W 61–59	15–2 (4–2)	Harry A. Gampel Pavilion (10,167); Storrs, CT
January 22*; 2:00 pm, CBS	No. 8	Tennessee	W 72–61	16–2	XL Center (16,294); Hartford, CT
January 25; 9:00 pm, SNY	No. 5	at Marquette	W 76–68	17–2 (5–2)	Bradley Center (15,476); Milwaukee, WI
January 29; 12:00 pm, SNY	No. 5	No. 23 Louisville	L 78–79 ^{2OT}	17–3 (5–3)	Harry A. Gampel Pavilion (10,167); Storrs, CT
February 2; 7:00 pm, ESPN	No. 6	No. 17 Syracuse; Rivalry	L 58–66	17–4 (5–4)	XL Center (16,294); Hartford, CT
February 5; 7:00 pm, ESPNU	No. 6	at Seton Hall	W 61–59	18–4 (6–4)	Prudential Center (10,001); Newark, NJ
February 10; 7:00 pm, ESPN	No. 10	at St. John's	L 72–89	18–5 (6–5)	Madison Square Garden (13,652); New York, NY
February 13; 7:00 pm, SNY	No. 10	Providence	W 75–57	19–5 (7–5)	Harry A. Gampel Pavilion (10,167); Storrs, CT
February 16; 7:00 pm, SNY	No. 13	No. 9 Georgetown; Rivalry	W 78–70	20–5 (8–5)	XL Center (16,294); Hartford, CT
February 18; 9:00 pm, ESPN	No. 13	at No. 16 Louisville	L 58–71	20–6 (8–6)	KFC Yum! Center (22,776); Louisville, KY
February 24; 7:00 pm, ESPN	No. 14	Marquette	L 67–74 ^{OT}	20–7 (8–7)	XL Center (14,622); Hartford, CT
February 27; 12:00 pm, ESPNU	No. 14	at Cincinnati	W 67–59	21–7 (9–7)	Fifth Third Arena (11,246); Cincinnati, OH
March 2; 7:00 pm, ESPN2	No. 16	at West Virginia	L 56–65	21–8 (9–8)	WVU Coliseum (13,241); Morgantown, WV
March 5; 2:00 pm, ESPN	No. 16	No. 8 Notre Dame	L 67–70	21–9 (9–9)	Harry A. Gampel Pavilion (10,167); Storrs, CT
2011 Big East tournament
March 8; 12:00 pm, ESPN2	(9) No. 21	vs. (16) DePaul; Big East First round	W 97–71	22–9	Madison Square Garden (19,375); New York, NY
March 9; 12:00 pm, ESPN	(9) No. 21	vs. (8) No. 22 Georgetown; Big East Second round/Rivalry	W 79–62	23–9	Madison Square Garden (19,375); New York, NY
March 10; 12:00 pm, ESPN	(9) No. 21	vs. (1) No. 3 Pittsburgh; Big East Quarterfinals	W 76–74	24–9	Madison Square Garden (19,375); New York, NY
March 11; 7:00 pm, ESPN	(9) No. 21	vs. (4) No. 11 Syracuse; Big East Semifinals/Rivalry	W 76–71 ^{OT}	25–9	Madison Square Garden (19,375); New York, NY
March 12; 9:00 pm, ESPN	(9) No. 21	vs. (3) No. 14 Louisville; Big East Championship Game	W 69–66	26–9	Madison Square Garden (19,375); New York, NY
2011 NCAA Tournament
March 17*; 7:20 pm, TNT	(3 W) No. 9	vs. (14 W) Bucknell; NCAA First Round	W 81–52	27–9	Verizon Center (17,706); Washington, DC
March 19*; 9:40 pm, TBS	(3 W) No. 9	vs. (6 W) Cincinnati; NCAA Second Round	W 69–58	28–9	Verizon Center (18,684); Washington, DC
March 24*; 7:15 pm, CBS	(3 W) No. 9	vs. (2 W) No. 6 San Diego State; NCAA Sweet Sixteen	W 74–67	29–9	Honda Center (17,980); Anaheim, CA
March 26*; 7:05 pm, CBS	(3 W) No. 9	vs. (5 W) No. 17 Arizona; NCAA Elite Eight	W 65–63	30–9	Honda Center (17,856); Anaheim, CA
April 2*; 6:49 pm, CBS	(3 W) No. 9	vs. (4 E) No. 11 Kentucky; NCAA Final Four	W 56–55	31–9	Reliant Stadium (75,421); Houston, TX
April 4*; 9:00 pm, CBS	(3 W) No. 9	vs. (8 SE) Butler; NCAA National Championship	W 53–41	32–9	Reliant Stadium (70,376); Houston, TX
*Non-conference game. ^{#}Rankings from AP Poll. (#) Tournament seedings in parentheses.

== Players drafted into the NBA ==
Year	Round	Pick	Player	NBA club (at time of draft)
2011	1	9	Kemba Walker	Charlotte Bobcats
2012	1	12	Jeremy Lamb	Oklahoma City Thunder (acquired via trade from the Houston Rockets)
2013	2	57	Alex Oriakhi	Phoenix Suns
2014	1	24	Shabazz Napier	Miami Heat (acquired via trade from the Charlotte Hornets)
