= 2010–11 America East Conference men's basketball season =

2010–11 American East Conference men's basketball season
- League: NCAA Division I
- Sport: Basketball
- Duration: November 2010 – March 2011
- Teams: 9

Regular Season
- Season champions: Vermont Catamounts
- Runners-up: Boston University Terriers
- Season MVP: John Holland
- Top scorer: John Holland (Boston U) 19.2

Tournament
- Champions: Boston University Terriers
- Runners-up: Stony Brook Seawolves
- Finals MVP: John Holland (Boston U)

America East Conference men's basketball seasons
- ← 2009–2010 2011–2012 →

2010–11 America East men's basketball standings
| | Conf. | | | | Overall |
| Team | W | | L | PCT | W | | L | PCT |
|---|---|---|---|---|---|---|---|---|
| Vermont | 13 | – | 3 | .813 | 23 | – | 9 | .719 |
| Boston University† | 12 | – | 4 | .750 | 21 | – | 14 | .600 |
| Maine | 9 | – | 7 | .563 | 15 | – | 15 | .500 |
| Albany | 9 | – | 7 | .563 | 16 | – | 16 | .500 |
| Stony Brook | 8 | – | 8 | .500 | 15 | – | 17 | .469 |
| Hartford | 7 | – | 9 | .438 | 11 | – | 20 | .355 |
| New Hampshire | 6 | – | 10 | .375 | 12 | – | 18 | .400 |
| Binghamton | 4 | – | 12 | .250 | 8 | – | 23 | .258 |
| UMBC | 4 | – | 12 | .250 | 5 | – | 25 | .167 |
† 2011 America East tournament winner As of March 18, 2011; Rankings from AP Poll

The 2010–11 America East Conference men's basketball season marked the 31st season of America East Conference basketball. The 2011 America East men's basketball tournament was held for the second straight year at Chase Arena at Reich Family Pavilion in Hartford, Connecticut.

== America East Preseason Poll ==
| Rank | Team | Votes |
|---|---|---|
| 1 | Boston University | 62 |
| 2 | Stony Brook | 57 |
| 3 | Maine | 51 |
| 4 | New Hampshire | 41 |
| 5 | Vermont | 35 |
| 6 | Hartford | 24 |
| 7 | Binghamton | 23 |
| 8 | Albany | 22 |
| 9 | UMBC | 9 |

== Conference awards & honors ==
=== All-Conference Preseason Teams ===
First Team
Greer Wright (Binghamton)

John Holland (Boston University)
Jake O'Brien (Boston University)
Gerald McLemore (Maine)
Evan Fjeld (Vermont)

=== Weekly honors ===
Throughout the conference regular season, the America East offices named a player of the week and rookie of the week each Monday.

| Week | Player of the week | Rookie of the week |
|---|---|---|
| November 15, 2010 | Greer Wright (Binghamton) | Brian Voelkel (Vermont) |
| November 22, 2010 | Evan Fjeld (Vermont) | Chase Plummer (UMBC) |
| November 29, 2010 | Logan Aronhalt (Albany) | Luke Devlin (Albany) |
| December 6, 2010 | Tim Ambrose (Albany) | Brian Voelkel (Vermont) |
| December 13, 2010 | Tim Ambrose (Albany) | Brian Voelkel (Vermont) |
| December 20, 2010 | Mike Black (Albany) | Pina Guillaume (Binghamton) |
| December 27, 2010 | Darryl Partin (Boston University) | Brian Voelkel (Vermont) |
| January 3, 2011 | Troy Barnies (Maine) | Luke Devlin (Albany) |
| January 10, 2011 | Morgan Sabia (Hartford); Troy Barnies (Maine) | D. J. Irving (Boston University) |
| January 17, 2011 | John Holland (Boston University); Tyrone Conley (New Hampshire) | Luke Devlin (Albany) |
| January 24, 2011 | Chris De La Rosa (UMBC) | D. J. Irving (Boston University) |
| January 31, 2011 | Logan Aronhalt (Albany); Mahamoud Jabbi (Binghamton) | Brian Voelkel (Vermont) |
| February 7, 2011 | John Holland (Boston University) | Luke Devlin (Albany) |
| February 14, 2011 | John Holland (Boston University) | Brian Voelkel (Vermont) |
| February 21, 2011 | John Holland (Boston University) | Luke Devlin (Albany) |
| February 28, 2011 | Mike Black (Albany) | D. J. Irving (Boston University) |

=== America East All-Conference Teams ===
First Team
Tim Ambrose (Albany)
John Holland (Boston University)
Darryl Partin (Boston University)
Troy Barnies (Maine)
Evan Fjeld (Vermont)

Second Team
Joe Zeglinski (Hartford)
Gerald McLemore (Maine)
Chris De La Rosa (UMBC)
Tyrone Conley (New Hampshire)
Bryan Dougher (Stony Brook)

Third Team
Logan Aronhalt (Albany)
Mike Black (Albany)
Mahamoud Jabbi (Binghamton)
Morgan Sabia (Hartford)
Brendan Bald (Vermont)

=== America East All-Defensive Team ===
First Team
Mahamoud Jabbi (Binghamton)
Patrick Hazel (Boston University)
Milton Burton (Hartford)
Chandler Rhoads (New Hampshire)
Garvey Young (Vermont)

=== America East All-Freshmen Team ===
First Team
Luke Devlin (Albany)
D. J. Irving (Boston University)
Dom Morris (Boston University)
Jordon Bronner (New Hampshire)
Brian Voelkel (Vermont)

=== America East All-Academic Team ===
First Team
Billy Allen (Albany)
Logan Aronhalt (Albany)
Jacob Iati (Albany)
Andrew Rogers (Maine)
Brian Benson (New Hampshire)

=== Player of the Year ===
John Holland from Boston University was awarded Player of the Year honors in the 2010-2011 season.

=== Coach of the Year ===
Mike Lonergan of Vermont was awarded Coach of the Year honors in the 2010-2011 season.

=== Freshmen of the Year ===
Brian Voelkel of Vermont was awarded Freshmen of the Year honors in the 2010-2011 season.

=== Defensive Player of the Year ===
Brendan Bald of Vermont was awarded Defensive Player of the Year honors in the 2010-2011 season.

=== Scholar Athlete ===
Evan Fjeld of Vermont was awarded Scholar Athlete honors in the 2010-2011 season.
