= 2010–11 Hartford Hawks men's basketball team =

Hartford Hawks men's basketball season

2010–11 Hartford Hawks men's basketball
- Conference: America East Conference
- Record: 11–20 (7–9 America East)
- Head coach: John Gallagher (1st season)
- Assistant coaches: Chris Gerlufsen; Drew Dawson; Matt Blue
- Home arena: Chase Arena at Reich Family Pavilion

2010–11 America East men's basketball standings
	Conf.				Overall
Team	W		L	PCT	W		L	PCT
Vermont	13	–	3	.813	23	–	9	.719
Boston University†	12	–	4	.750	21	–	14	.600
Maine	9	–	7	.563	15	–	15	.500
Albany	9	–	7	.563	16	–	16	.500
Stony Brook	8	–	8	.500	15	–	17	.469
Hartford	7	–	9	.438	11	–	20	.355
New Hampshire	6	–	10	.375	12	–	18	.400
Binghamton	4	–	12	.250	8	–	23	.258
UMBC	4	–	12	.250	5	–	25	.167
† 2011 America East tournament winner As of March 18, 2011; Rankings from AP Poll

The 2010–11 Hartford Hawks men's basketball team represented the University of Hartford during the 2010–11 NCAA Division I men's basketball season. John Gallagher who served as an assistant coach at Hartford from 2006-2008 returned to take over the head coaching position after Dan Leibovitz left at the end of the previous season to take an assistant coaching position at Penn. Also this season Hartford restarted its old division II rivalry with Central Connecticut as they played in the first game of the season in the Connecticut 6 Tournament.

== Roster ==
2010–11 Hartford Hawks men's basketball team
Players
Coaches

Pos.	#	Name	Height	Weight	Year	Previous school	Hometown
G	2	Charles White	6 ft 1 in (1.85 m)	170 lb (77 kg)	So	Simon Gratz	Philadelphia, PA
G	11	Andres Torres	5 ft 10 in (1.78 m)	170 lb (77 kg)	Sr	Colegio Adianez	Guaynabo, Puerto Rico
F/C	21	Genesis Maciel	6 ft 9 in (2.06 m)	250 lb (113 kg)	Jr	Centennial; Worcester Academy	Los Angeles, CA
F	23	Morgan Sabia	6 ft 8 in (2.03 m)	200 lb (91 kg)	Sr	Sir Francis Drake	San Anselmo, CA
G	24	Joe Zeglinski	6 ft 0 in (1.83 m)	185 lb (84 kg)	Sr	Archbishop Ryan	Philadelphia, PA
F	25	Anthony Minor	6 ft 6 in (1.98 m)	200 lb (91 kg)	Sr	Plymouth Whitemarsh	Philadelphia, PA
F	31	Kevin Estes	6 ft 7 in (2.01 m)	230 lb (104 kg)	Sr	Benedictine	Richmond, VA
G	32	Clayton Brothers	6 ft 1 in (1.85 m)	170 lb (77 kg)	Jr	Roxbury	Philadelphia, PA
G	32	Clayton Brothers	6 ft 1 in (1.85 m)	170 lb (77 kg)	Jr	Roxbury	Philadelphia, PA
F	52	Xavier Williams	6 ft 7 in (2.01 m)	240 lb (109 kg)	So	Elmont	New York, NY

Head coach

John Gallagher (Saint Joseph's)

Assistant coach(es)

- Chris Gerlufsen (Randolph–Macon)
- Drew Dawson
- Matt Blue

Legend

- (C) Team captain
- (S) Suspended
- (I) Ineligible
- (W) Walk-on
- Injured
- Current redshirt

Roster
Last update: April 26, 2020

== Schedule ==
Date time, TV	Rank^{#}	Opponent^{#}	Result	Record	Site (attendance) city, state
Non-conference regular season
Nov 13, 2010*; 6:00pm		vs. Central Connecticut; Connecticut 6 tournament Rivalry	L 62–64	0–1	Mohegan Sun Arena (3,829); Uncasville, CT
Nov 16, 2010*; 7:00pm		at Quinnipiac	L 64–66	0–2	TD Bank Sports Center (1,895); Hamden, CT
Nov 19, 2010*; 7:00pm		Dartmouth	L 57–71	0–3	Chase Arena at Reich Family Pavilion (1,359); West Hartford, CT
Nov 24, 2010*; 7:00pm		Saint Francis (PA)	W 60–55	1–3	Chase Arena at Reich Family Pavilion (823); West Hartford, CT
Nov 27, 2010*; 1:00pm		at Fordham	L 57–61	1–4	Rose Hill Gymnasium (1,375); Bronx, NY
Nov 30, 2010*; 7:00pm		at Yale	L 76–81	1–5	Payne Whitney Gymnasium (516); New Haven, CT
Dec 2, 2010*; 7:00pm		Brown	W 58–46	2–5	Chase Arena at Reich Family Pavilion (1,012); West Hartford, CT
Dec 5, 2010* &;00pm		at Florida State	L 38–60	2–6	Donald L. Tucker Civic Center (5,252); Tallahassee, FL
Dec 8, 2010*; 7:00pm		at Sacred Heart	L 55–56	2–7	William H. Pitt Center (432); Fairfield, CT
Dec 11, 2010*; 4:00pm		at Monmouth	L 74–78 ^{2OT}	2–8	OceanFirst Bank Center (880); West Long Branch, NJ
Dec 28, 2010*; 10:30pm		at California	L 56–74	2–9	Haas Pavilion (7,591); Berkeley, CA
Dec 31, 2010*; 8:00pm		at Saint Mary's	L 63–87	2–10	McKeon Pavilion (2,996); Maraga, CA
Jan 3, 2011*; 7:00pm		St. Francis Brooklyn	W 82–74	3–10	Chase Arena at Reich Family Pavilion (794); West Hartford, CT
America East regular season
Jan 5, 2011; 7:00pm		at Maine	W 61–59	4–10 (1–0)	Alfond Arena (1,075); Orono, ME
Jan 9, 2011; 3:00pm		Albany	W 62–42	5–10 (2–0)	Chase Arena at Reich Family Pavilion (951); West Hartford, CT
Jan 11, 2011; 7:00pm		at New Hampshire	L 54–57	5–11 (2–1)	Lundholm Gym (498); Durham, NH
Jan 17, 2011; 7:00pm		at Binghamton	W 72–61	6–11 (3–1)	Binghamton University Events Center (2,439); Vestal, NY
Jan 20, 2011; 7:00pm		UMBC	L 70–74 ^{2OT}	6–12 (3–2)	Chase Arena at Reich Family Pavilion (1,129); West Hartford, CT
Jan 22, 2011; 4:00pm		Boston University	W 59–55	7–12 (4–2)	Chase Arena at Reich Family Pavilion (1,518); West Hartford, CT
Jan 25, 2011; 7:00pm		at Vermont	L 51–72	7–13 (4–3)	Patrick Gym (2,711); Burlington, VT
Jan 29, 2011; 3:00pm		at Stony Brook	L 35–69	7–14 (4–4)	Pritchard Gymnasium (1,184); Stony Brook, NY
Feb 3, 2011; 7:00pm		Vermont	L 47–61	7–15 (4–5)	Chase Arena at Reich Family Pavilion (808); West Hartford, CT
Feb 5, 2011; 7:00pm		at Albany	L 59–62	7–16 (4–6)	SEFCU Arena (4,037); Albany, NY
Feb 10, 2011; 7:00pm		Maine	W 74–65	8–16 (5–6)	Chase Arena at Reich Family Pavilion (753); West Hartford, CT
Feb 12, 2011; 7:00pm		at Boston University	L 50–61	8–17 (5–7)	Case Gym (851); Boston, MA
Feb 16, 2011; 7:00pm		Binghamton	L 47–77	8–18 (5–8)	Chase Arena at Reich Family Pavilion (543); West Hartford, CT
Feb 19, 2011; 7:00pm		at UMBC	W 64–57	9–18 (6–8)	Retriever Activities Center (2,066); Catonsville, MD
Feb 23, 2011; 7:00pm		Stony Brook	L 73–79 ^{OT}	9–19 (6–9)	Chase Arena at Reich Family Pavilion (1,458); West Hartford, CT
Feb 27, 2011; 3:00pm		New Hampshire	W 62–54	10–19 (7–9)	Chase Arena at Reich Family Pavilion (1,335); West Hartford, CT
America East Men's tournament
Mar 5, 2011; 8:15pm	(6)	(3) Maine; Quarterfinals	W 66–63	11–19	Chase Arena at Reich Family Pavilion (1,969); West Hartford, CT
Mar 6, 2011; 7:34pm	(6)	(2) Boston University; Semifinals	L 49–55	11-20	Chase Arena at Reich Family Pavilion (2,169); West Hartford, CT
*Non-conference game. ^{#}Rankings from AP Poll. (#) Tournament seedings in parentheses. All times are in Eastern.
