= 2010–11 Albany Great Danes men's basketball team =

American college basketball season

2010–11 Albany Great Danes men's basketball
- Conference: America East Conference
- Record: 16–16 (9–7 America East)
- Head coach: Will Brown
- Assistant coaches: Pat Filien; Jeremy Friel; Chad O'Donnell
- Home arena: SEFCU Arena

2010–11 America East men's basketball standings
	Conf.				Overall
Team	W		L	PCT	W		L	PCT
Vermont	13	–	3	.813	23	–	9	.719
Boston University†	12	–	4	.750	21	–	14	.600
Maine	9	–	7	.563	15	–	15	.500
Albany	9	–	7	.563	16	–	16	.500
Stony Brook	8	–	8	.500	15	–	17	.469
Hartford	7	–	9	.438	11	–	20	.355
New Hampshire	6	–	10	.375	12	–	18	.400
Binghamton	4	–	12	.250	8	–	23	.258
UMBC	4	–	12	.250	5	–	25	.167
† 2011 America East tournament winner As of March 18, 2011; Rankings from AP Poll

The 2010–11 Albany Great Danes men's basketball team represented the University at Albany in the 2010–11 NCAA Division I men's basketball season. They finished the season 16–16 overall, 9–7 in America East play to finish in a tie for fourth place.

== Roster ==
2010–11 Albany Men's Basketball; Current Roster
Pos.	#	Name	Class	Ht.	Wt.	Hometown	High school
G	0	Jacob Iati	Sophomore	5–10	170 lb	York, PA	York Catholic
G	2	Logan Aronhalt	Sophomore	6–3	210 lb	Zanesville, OH	Zanesville
F	4	Fran Urli	Senior	6–8	225 lb	Zagreb, Croatia
G	5	Derrek Tartt	Sophomore	6–3	175 lb	Chicago, IL	Fenwick
G	10	Mike Black	Sophomore	6–0	175 lb	Chicago, IL	Fenwick
C	11	Luke Devlin	Freshman	6–8	230 lb	Sydney, Australia	Newington College
F	14	Russell Moore	Junior	6–3	200 lb	New Orleans, LA	St. Augustine
F	20	Theo Hatcher	Junior	6–7	210 lb	Fort Lauderdale, FL	New Creations Christian School
C	21	Blake Metcalf	Sophomore	6–9	240 lb	Camby, IN	Plainfield
G/F	22	Ralph Watts	(redshirt) Freshman	6–5	195 lb	Peekskill, NY	Peekskill
G	23	Tim Ambrose	Senior	6–0	220 lb	Brentwood, NY	Our Savior New American School
F	24	Jake Lindfors	Sophomore	6–10	240 lb	Elk Grove Village, IL	Driscoll Catholic
F	33	Billy Allen	Junior	6–6	210 lb	Hamilton, Ohio	Hamilton
C	44	John Puk	(redshirt) Freshman	6–10	225 lb	Waterloo, IA	Waterloo West

=== Incoming signees ===
College recruiting
Name	Hometown	School	Height	Weight	Commit date
Luke Devlin; PF	Sydney, Australia	Newington College (AUS)	6 ft 8 in (2.03 m)	235 lb (107 kg)	
Luke Devlin; PF	Recruit ratings: (40)				
Theo Hatcher; SF	Fort Lauderdale, Florida	Central Arizona College (AZ)	6 ft 7 in (2.01 m)	210 lb (95 kg)	
Theo Hatcher; SF	Recruit ratings: (40)				
Russell Moore Jr. SG	New Orleans, Louisiana	John A. Logan College (IL)	6 ft 3 in (1.91 m)	200 lb (91 kg)	
Russell Moore Jr. SG	Recruit ratings: (40)				
Overall recruit ranking:
Note: In many cases, Scout, Rivals, 247Sports, On3, and ESPN may conflict in their listings of height and weight.; In these cases, the average was taken. ESPN grades are on a 100-point scale.; Sources: "ESPN". ESPN.; "2010 Team Ranking". Rivals.

=== Coaches ===
Name	Position	Year at Albany	Alma Mater (Year)
Will Brown	Head coach	10th	Dowling College (1995)
Pat Filien	Assistant coach	6th	Saint Rose (1993)
Jeremy Friel	Assistant coach	3rd	New Hampshire (2005)
Chad O'Donnell	Assistant coach	7th	Springfield College (1994)
Brent Wilson	Director of Operations	2nd	Albany (2008)
Josh Pelletier	Graduate Assistant	1st	Saint Rose (2009)

== Schedule and results ==
Date time, TV	Rank^{#}	Opponent^{#}	Result	Record	High points	High rebounds	High assists	Site (attendance) city, state
Regular season
November 12, 2010*; 7:30 pm		Cornell	L 61–65	0–1	20 – Ambrose	9 – Devlin	4 – Ambrose	SEFCU Arena (3,983); Albany, NY
November 15, 2010*; 7:00 pm		American	L 44–57	0–2	13 – Ambrose	7 – Ambrose	5 – Ambrose	SEFCU Arena (1,215); Albany, NY
November 17, 2010*; 7:30 pm		at Georgia Tech; Legends Classic	L 51–78	0–3	16 – Ambrose	6 – Lindfors	5 – Iati	Alexander Memorial Coliseum (5,121); Atlanta, GA
November 20, 2010*; 7:00 pm		at Fairleigh Dickinson	W 72–46	1–3	27 – Aronhalt	10 – Aronhalt	3 – Iati	Rothman Center (667); Hackensack, NJ
November 23, 2010*; 7:00 pm		Iona	L 65–86	1–4	25 – Aronhalt	7 – Devlin	4 – Devlin	SEFCU Arena (1,248); Albany, NY
November 26, 2010*; 7:30 pm		at Detroit; Legends Classic	L 82–84 ^{2OT}	1–5	18 – 2 tied	10 – Devlin	6 – Ambrose	Calihan Hall (2,017); Detroit, MI
November 27, 2010*; 5:00 pm		vs. Niagara; Legends Classic	W 75–65	2–5	30 – Aronhalt	10 – Puk	3 – Watts	Calihan Hall (417); Detroit, MI
November 28, 2010*; 3:00 pm		vs. Bowling Green; Legends Classic	W 56–55	3–5	18 – Aronhalt	7 – 3 tied	6 – Ambrose	Calihan Hall (313); Detroit, MI
December 4, 2010*; 7:00 pm, TWC Sports		at Siena; Rivalry	W 88–82 ^{OT}	4–5	27 – Ambrose	7 – Ambrose	5 – Black	Times Union Center (10,753); Albany, NY
December 6, 2010*; 7:30 pm		at Yale	L 53–74	4–6	15 – Ambrose	6 – 2 tied	2 – 2 tied	Payne Whitney Gymnasium (720); New Haven, CT
December 11, 2010*; 7:00 pm		Central Connecticut	W 64–63	5–6	21 – Ambrose	11 – Devlin	4 – Ambrose	SEFCU Arena (1,879); Albany, NY
December 18, 2010*; 7:00 pm		Mount St. Mary's	W 77–57	6–6	19 – 2 tied	8 – Ambrose	5 – Black	SEFCU Arena (1,720); Albany, NY
December 22, 2010*; 7:00 pm		at Colgate	W 63–61	7–6	19 – Ambrose	5 – Metcalf	3 – Ambrose	Cotterell Court (463); Hamilton, NY
December 28, 2010*; 7:00 pm, Fox Sports Ohio		at Xavier	L 64–88	7–7	24 – Ambrose	5 – 3 tied	5 – Ambrose	Cintas Center (10,004); Cincinnati, OH
December 30, 2010*; 7:00 pm, TWC Sports		at Wagner	L 65–80	7–8	18 – Black	10 – Devlin	3 – 2 tied	Spiro Sports Center (1,257); Staten Island, NY
January 2, 2011; 4:00 pm		New Hampshire	W 59–44	8–8 (1–0)	16 – Ambrose	9 – Ambrose	5 – Ambrose	SEFCU Arena (1,730); Albany, NY
January 6, 2011; 4:00 pm, WCAXtra		at Vermont	L 64–75	8–9 (1–1)	21 – Aronhalt	4 – 4 tied	4 – Ambrose	Patrick Gym (2,270); Burlington, VT
January 9, 2011; 3:00 pm		at Hartford	L 42–62	8–10 (1–2)	17 – Aronhalt	8 – Devlin	1 – 6 tied	Chase Arena at Reich Family Pavilion (951); West Hartford, CT
January 12, 2011; 7:00 pm, TWC Sports		Maine	L 64–66	8–11 (1–3)	18 – Black	6 – 3 tied	5 – Ambrose	SEFCU Arena (1,041); Albany, NY
January 15, 2011; 7:00 pm, TWC Sports		Boston University	L 67–70	8–12 (1–4)	18 – Ambrose	6 – Watts	8 – Black	SEFCU Arena (1,348); Albany, NY
January 17, 2011; 5:00 pm, MSG Plus/ESPN3		at Stony Brook	W 52–50	9–12 (2–4)	15 – Ambrose	14 – Ambrose	4 – Black	Pritchard Gymnasium (1,630); Stony Brook, NY
January 20, 2011; 7:00 pm, TWC Sports		Binghamton	W 76–37	10–12 (3–4)	15 – Black	7 – Ambrose	5 – Ambrose	SEFCU Arena (1,804); Albany, NY
January 26, 2011; 7:00 pm		at UMBC	W 66–63	11–12 (4–4)	28 – Aronhalt	9 – Puk	4 – 2 tied	Retriever Activities Center (607); Catonsville, MD
January 29, 2011; 7:00 pm		Vermont	L 54–63	11–13 (4–5)	16 – Ambrose	8 – 2 tied	3 – Black	SEFCU Arena (3,754); Albany, NY
February 2, 2011; 7:00 pm		at New Hampshire	L 59–62 ^{OT}	11–14 (4–6)	15 – Ambrose	14 – Devlin	3 – 2 tied	Lundholm Gym (345); Durham, NH
February 5, 2011; 7:00 pm, TWC Sports		Hartford; Big Purple Growl	W 62–59	12–14 (5–6)	20 – Ambrose	11 – Devlin	7 – Black	SEFCU Arena (4,037); Albany, NY
February 10, 2011; 9:35 pm		vs. Boston University; Big Apple Battle	L 44–63	12–15 (5–7)	13 – Ambrose	6 – 2 tied	3 – Black	Madison Square Garden (13,652); New York City, NY
February 14, 2011; 7:00 pm, MSG Plus/ESPN3		Stony Brook	W 58–43	13–15 (6–7)	22 – Ambrose	11 – Devlin	4 – Aronhalt	SEFCU Arena (1,728); Albany, NY
February 20, 2011; 3:00 pm		at Binghamton	W 57–54	14–15 (7–7)	16 – Aronhalt	13 – Devlin	4 – Ambrose	Binghamton University Events Center (3,735); Vestal, NY
February 23, 2011; 7:00 pm, TWC Sports		UMBC	W 83–67	15–15 (8–7)	19 – Aronhalt	7 – Ambrose	7 – Ambrose	SEFCU Arena (2,638); Albany, NY
February 27, 2011; 2:00 pm, TWC Sports		Maine	W 81–77 ^{OT}	16–15 (9–7)	26 – Black	12 – Metcalf	6 – Ambrose	Alfond Arena (1,678); Orono, ME
America East tournament
March 5, 2011; 12:00 pm	(4)	vs. (5) Stony Brook; AE Quarterfinals	L 61–67	16–16	24 – Ambrose	12 – Devlin	4 – Ambrose	Chase Arena at Reich Family Pavilion; West Hartford, CT
*Non-conference game. ^{#}Rankings from AP Poll. (#) Tournament seedings in parentheses. All times are in Eastern Time. Source
