= 2010–11 New Hampshire Wildcats men's basketball team =

American college basketball season

2010–11 New Hampshire Wildcats men's basketball
- Conference: America East Conference
- Record: 12-17 (6-10 America East)
- Head coach: Bill Herrion
- Assistant coaches: Kenneth Dempsey; Chris Mohr; Jean Bain
- Home arena: Lundholm Gym

2010–11 America East men's basketball standings
	Conf.				Overall
Team	W		L	PCT	W		L	PCT
Vermont	13	–	3	.813	23	–	9	.719
Boston University†	12	–	4	.750	21	–	14	.600
Maine	9	–	7	.563	15	–	15	.500
Albany	9	–	7	.563	16	–	16	.500
Stony Brook	8	–	8	.500	15	–	17	.469
Hartford	7	–	9	.438	11	–	20	.355
New Hampshire	6	–	10	.375	12	–	18	.400
Binghamton	4	–	12	.250	8	–	23	.258
UMBC	4	–	12	.250	5	–	25	.167
† 2011 America East tournament winner As of March 18, 2011; Rankings from AP Poll

The 2010–11 New Hampshire Wildcats men's basketball team represented the University of New Hampshire in the 2010–11 NCAA Division I men's basketball season.

== Roster ==
2010–11 New Hampshire Men's Basketball Current Roster
Pos.	#	Name		Class	Ht.	Wt.	Hometown	High School
C	1	United States	Dane DiLiegro	Senior	6–9	240 lb	Lexington, MA	Worcester Academy
G/F	2	United States	DeAndrav Buckley	Freshman	6–4	205 lb	Romulus, MI	Romulus
G	3	United States	Chandler Rhoads	Sophomore	6–4	190 lb	Berryville, VA	Air Force Prep
G	5	United States	Jordon Bronner	Freshman	6–0	170 lb	Sleepy Hollow, NY	Iona Prep
G	10	United States	Ryan Herrion	Sophomore	6–0	170 lb	Dover, NH	Dover
F/C	11	United States	James Valladares	Senior	6–9	230 lb	Kaufman, TX	Kaufman
F	14	United States	Patrick Konan	Senior	6–6	205 lb	Gainesville, FL	The Rock School
F	15	United States	Ferg Myrick	Sophomore	6–6	200 lb	Philadelphia, PA	Prep Charter
G	21	United States	Tyrone Conley	Senior	6–2	200 lb	Burlington, VT	Burlington
G	22	United States	Scott Morris	Freshman	6–2	200 lb	Walkersville, MD	Walkersville
F	24	Canada	Kazadi Nyanguila	Freshman	6–7	230 lb	Montreal, PQ	Vanier College
G	25	United States	Alvin Abreu	Senior	6–2	188 lb	Lynn, MA	Boys to Men Academy
C	33	United States	Chris Matagrano	Sophomore	6–9	250 lb	Sayreville, NJ	Blair Academy
F	34	United States	Brian Benson	Junior	6–9	215 lb	Rochester, NY	Greece Athena

=== Coaches ===
Name	Position	Year at New Hampshire	Alma Mater (Year)
Bill Herrion	Head coach	4th	Merrimack (1981)
Kenneth Dempsey	Associate head coach	6th	Moravian (1983)
Chris Mohr	Assistant coach	6th	Merrimack (1997)
Jean Bain	Assistant coach	6th	Northeastern (2002)
Scott Weitzell	Director of Operations	9th	

== Schedule ==
2010–11 game log
November

Game	Date	Team	Score	High points	High rebounds	High assists	Location Attendance	Record
1	November 13	Lesley University	W 79-47	(No stats available)	(No stats available)	(No stats available)	Lundholm Gym, Durham, NH	1-0
2	November 16	Dartmouth	W 55–53	Conley – 18	DiLiegro – 10	Rhoads – 2	Leede Arena, Hanover, NH (614)	2–0
3	November 20	Holy Cross	W 55–52	Conley – 16	DiLiegro – 9	Bronner – 4	Lundholm Gym, Durham, NH (1,025)	3–0
4	November 23	Sacred Heart	L 50–42	Myrick – 10	DiLiegro – 8	Conley – 3	William H. Pitt Center, Fairfield, CT (449)	3–1
5	November 27	Brown	W 70–66	DiLiegro – 23	DiLiegro – 12	Rhoads – 5	Lundholm Gym, Durham, NH (885)	4–1
6	November 30	No. 9 Connecticut	L 62–55	Myrick – 19	DiLiegro – 10	Conley – 3	Harry A. Gampel Pavilion, Storrs, CT (8,558)	4–2

December

Game	Date	Team	Score	High points	High rebounds	High assists	Location Attendance	Record
7	December 4	Colgate	W 65–60	DiLiegro – 20	DiLiegro – 9	Conley – 3	Cotterell Court, Hamilton, NY (500)	5–2
8	December 9	Army	L 71–63	Myrick – 13	DiLiegro – 10	Rhoads – 6	Lundholm Gym, Durham, NH (917)	5–3
9	December 18	Rhode Island	L 64–52	Conley – 16	Benson – 7	Benson – 2	Ryan Center, Kingston, RI (4,274)	5–4
10	December 22	Central Connecticut State	L 71–50	Buckley – 12	Benson – 9	Herrion – 2	William H. Detrick Gymnasium, New Britain, CT (1,074)	5–5
11	December 29	Cornell	W 68–66	Myrick – 14	Rhoads – 6	Rhoads – 5	Stuart C. Siegel Center, Richmond, VA	6–5
12	December 30	VCU	L 78–65	Rhoads – 15	Benson – 11	Conley – 4	Stuart C. Siegel Center, Richmond, VA (5,590)	6–6

January

Game	Date	Team	Score	High points	High rebounds	High assists	Location Attendance	Record
13	January 2	Albany	L 59–44	Conley – 15	DiLiegro – 11	Conley – 3	SEFCU Arena Albany, NY (1,730)	6–7
14	January 4	Boston University	L 61–54	Conley – 14	Benson – 8	Conley – 4	Case Gym, Boston, MA (401)	6–8
15	January 8	Binghamton	L 66–61	Conley – 16	Benson – 8	Conley – 3	Lundholm Gym, Durham, NH (801)	6–9
16	January 11	Hartford	W 57–54	Conley – 33	DiLiegro – 11	Rhoads – 4	Lundholm Gym, Durham, NH (498)	7–9
17	January 15	Stony Brook	L 64–60 2OT	Conley – 14	Benson – 22	Buckley – 3	Pritchard Gymnasium, Stony Brook, NY (1,065)	7–10
18	January 20	Vermont	L 61–53	Rhoads – 20	Conley – 5	Rhoads – 2	Lundholm Gym, Durham, NH (538)	7–11
19	January 23	UMBC	W 80–60	Conley – 22	Benson – 16	Conley – 7	Lundholm Gym, Durham, NH (590)	8–11
20	January 25	Maine	L 64–50	Metagrano – 8	DiLiegro – 9	Rhoads – 3	Alfond Arena, Orono, ME (1,268)	8–12
21	January 29	Boston University	W 60–48	Conley – 26	Benson – 9	Rhoads – 3	Lundholm Gym, Durham, NH (1,364)	9–12
22	January 31	Vermont	L 63–49	Conley – 12	Benson – 11	Bronner – 5	Patrick Gym, Burlington, VT (2,484)	9–13

February

Game	Date	Team	Score	High points	High rebounds	High assists	Location Attendance	Record
23	February 2	Albany	W 62-59 OT	Rhoades - 15	Benson - 14	Bronner - 6	Lundholm Gym, Durham, NH	10-13
24	February 5	Binghamton	W 65-59	Conley - 22	DiLiegro - 10	Bronner - 3	Binghamton University Events Center, Binghamton, NY	11-13
25	February 9	Stony Brook	L 63-56	Conley - 17	DiLiegro & Benson - 7	Conley - 3	Lundholm Gym, Durham, NH	11-14
26	February 12	UMBC	W 63-46	Conley - 25	DiLiegro - 12	Rhoads - 6	Retriever Activities Center, Cantonsville, MD	12-14
27	February 19	Marist	L 58-49	Rhoads - 16	Benson - 10	Conley & Rhoads - 3	McCann Arena, Poughkeepsie, NY	12-15
28	February 22	Maine	L 70-53	Conley - 16	DiLiegro - 11	Rhoads - 4	Lundholm Gymnasium, Durham, NH	12-16
29	February 29	Hartford	L 62=54	Conley & Benson - 16	Benson - 15	Rhoads - 5	Chase Arena at Reich Family Pavilion, West Hartford, CT	12-17

2010–11 team schedule
