= 2010–11 Vermont Catamounts men's basketball team =

American college basketball season

2010–11 Vermont Catamounts men's basketball

American East regular season champions

NIT, First round
- Conference: America East Conference
- Record: 23–9 (13–3 America East)
- Head coach: Mike Lonergan
- Assistant coaches: Hajj Turner; John Becker; Matt O'Brien
- Home arena: Patrick Gym

2010–11 America East men's basketball standings
	Conf.				Overall
Team	W		L	PCT	W		L	PCT
Vermont	13	–	3	.813	23	–	9	.719
Boston University†	12	–	4	.750	21	–	14	.600
Maine	9	–	7	.563	15	–	15	.500
Albany	9	–	7	.563	16	–	16	.500
Stony Brook	8	–	8	.500	15	–	17	.469
Hartford	7	–	9	.438	11	–	20	.355
New Hampshire	6	–	10	.375	12	–	18	.400
Binghamton	4	–	12	.250	8	–	23	.258
UMBC	4	–	12	.250	5	–	25	.167
† 2011 America East tournament winner As of March 18, 2011; Rankings from AP Poll

The 2010–11 Vermont Catamounts men's basketball team represented the University of Vermont in the 2010–11 NCAA Division I men's basketball season. The Catamounts won their third consecutive America East Conference regular season championship but lost in the semifinals of the conference tournament to Stony Brook. The Catamounts were invited to the National Invitation Tournament but lost in the first round to Cleveland State, 63–60.

== Roster ==
2010–11 Vermont Men's Basketball; Current Roster
Pos.	#	Name	Class	Ht.	Wt.	Hometown	High school
F	2	Luke Apfeld	Freshman	6–8	235 lb	Wolfeboro, NH	Brewster Academy
G	3	Joey Accaoui	Senior	5–8	165 lb	Lincoln, RI	St. Andrew's
G	12	Sandro Carissimo	Freshman	6–2	170 lb	Sleepy Hollow, NY	Iona Prep
G	14	Josh Elbaum	Freshman	6–3	195 lb	Wheatley Heights, NY	Northfield Mount Hermon
G	15	Simeon Marsalis	Sophomore	5–11	185 lb	New Rochelle, NY	Brewster Academy
G	20	Brendan Bald	Sophomore	6–4	200 lb	Millersville, MD	Severna Park
F	23	Brian Voelkel	Freshman	6–6	210 lb	Pleasantville, NY	Iona Prep
F/C	30	Pat Bergmann	(redshirt) Junior	6–10	210 lb	Burlington, VT	Rice Memorial
F	31	Clancy Rugg	Freshman	6–8	195 lb	Burlington, VT	Northfield Mount Hermon
F	32	Evan Fjeld	Senior	6–8	215 lb	Durham, NC	Durham Academy
F	34	Matt Glass	(redshirt) Junior	6–8	210 lb	Underhill, VT	Mt. Mansfield
F	40	Ryan McKeaney	Freshman	6–9	210 lb	Marlton, NJ	Cherokee
F/C	42	Ben Crenca	Sophomore	6–10	260 lb	Exeter, RI	Worcester Academy
F	45	Garrett Kissel	Senior	6–9	245 lb	Springfield, MA	St. Andrew's

=== Coaches ===
Name	Position	Year at Vermont	Alma Mater (Year)
Mike Lonergan	Head coach	6th	Catholic (1988)
Hajj Turner	Associate head coach	6th	Louisville (2001)
John Becker	Assistant coach	5th	Catholic (1988)
Matt O'Brien	Assistant coach	1st	Elmira College (2005)
Kyle Cieplicki	Director of Operations	1st	Vermont (2008)
Grant Wilson III	Athletic trainer	4th	Western Michigan (2002)
Gary Bruening	Athletic trainer	24th	William & Mary (1982)

== Schedule and results ==
Date time, TV	Rank^{#}	Opponent^{#}	Result	Record	Site (attendance) city, state
Exhibition
October 31, 2010*; 1:00 pm		Concordia	W 68–56	—	Patrick Gym; Burlington, VT
November 6, 2010*; 1:00 pm		Saint Michael's	W 69–60	—	Patrick Gym; Burlington, VT
Non-conference regular season
November 13, 2010*; 7:00 pm		at Siena	W 80–76	1–0	Times Union Center (8,047); Albany, NY
November 17, 2010*; 7:00 pm		at Connecticut	L 73–89	1–1	XL Center (10,216); Hartford, CT
November 20, 2010*; 3:00 pm		at Quinnipiac	W 79–75	2–1	TD Bank Sports Center (2,321); Hamden, CT
November 24, 2010*; 7:00 pm		Loyola	W 51–48	3–1	Patrick Gym (2,242); Burlington, VT
November 27, 2010*; 1:00 pm		NJIT	W 69–50	4–1	Patrick Gym (2,176); Burlington, VT
December 1, 2010*; 7:00 pm		Dartmouth	W 80–53	5–1	Patrick Gym (2,160); Burlington, VT
December 4, 2010*; 1:00 pm		Yale	W 82–78	6–1	Patrick Gym (2,751); Burlington, VT
December 8, 2010*; 7:00 pm		vs. No. 21 BYU; Hometown Classic	L 58–86	6–2	Glens Falls Civic Center (6,300); Glens Falls, NY
December 12, 2010*; 1:00 pm		Marist	W 75–67	7–2	Patrick Gym (2,148); Burlington, VT
December 20, 2010*; 7:30 pm		at Fairfield	L 59–67	7–3	Arena at Harbor Yard (2,472); Bridgeport, CT
December 22, 2010*; 7:30 pm		at Iona	W 84–79	8–3	Hynes Athletic Center (2,611); New Rochelle, NY
December 29, 2010*; 7:00 pm		Mount St. Mary's	W 68–61 ^{OT}	9–3	Patrick Gym (2,712); Burlington, VT
America East Conference regular season
January 4, 2011; 7:00 pm		at Stony Brook	W 55–49	10–3 (1–0)	Pritchard Gymnasium (1,161); Stony Brook, NY
January 6, 2011; 7:00 pm		Albany	W 60–48	11–3 (2–0)	Patrick Gym (2,270); Burlington, VT
January 9, 2011; 1:00 pm		at Boston University	L 65–74	11–4 (2–1)	Agganis Arena (683); Boston, MA
January 15, 2011; 1:00 pm		UMBC	W 85–48	12–4 (3–1)	Patrick Gym (2,479); Burlington, VT
January 18, 2011; 7:30 pm		Maine	L 58–72	12–5 (3–2)	Patrick Gym (2,830); Burlington, VT
January 20, 2011; 7:00 pm		at New Hampshire	W 61–53	13–5 (4–2)	Lundholm Gym (538); Durham, NH
January 23, 2011; 2:00 pm		at Binghamton	W 70–52	14–5 (5–2)	Binghamton University Events Center (3,267); Binghamton, NY
January 25, 2011; 7:00 pm		Hartford	W 72–51	15–5 (6–2)	Patrick Gym (2,711); Burlington, VT
January 29, 2011; 7:00 pm		at Albany	W 63–54	16–5 (7–2)	SEFCU Arena (3,754); Albany, NY
January 31, 2011; 7:30 pm		New Hampshire	W 63–49	17–5 (8–2)	Patrick Gym (2,484); Burlington, VT
February 3, 2011; 7:00 pm		at Hartford	W 61–47	18–5 (9–2)	Chase Arena at Reich Family Pavilion (808); Hartford, CT
February 6, 2011; 1:00 pm		Stony Brook	W 65–42	19–5 (10–2)	Patrick Gym (2,617); Burlington, VT
February 9, 2011; 7:00 pm		at UMBC	W 80–67	20–5 (11–2)	Retriever Activities Center (1,285); Catonsville, MD
February 13, 2011; 1:00 pm		Binghamton	W 60–51	21–5 (12–2)	Patrick Gym (3,266); Burlington, VT
February 16, 2011; 7:30 pm		at Maine	W 73–57	22–5 (13–2)	Alfond Arena (1,744); Orono, ME
February 19, 2011*; 5:00 pm		at College of Charleston; ESPN BracketBusters	L 70–85	22–6	TD Arena (4,874); Charleston, SC
February 27, 2011; 1:00 pm		Boston University	L 64–66 ^{OT}	22–7 (13–3)	Patrick Gym (3,266); Burlington, VT
America East tournament
March 5, 2011*; 2:15 pm	(1)	vs. (9) Binghamton	W 57–46	23–7	Chase Arena at Reich Family Pavilion (1,913); West Hartford, CT
March 6, 2011*; 5:00 pm	(1)	vs. (5) Stony Brook	L 47–69	23–8	Chase Arena at Reich Family Pavilion; West Hartford, CT
NIT
March 15, 2011*; 7:00 pm	(7 VT)	at (2 VT) Cleveland State	L 60–63	23–9	Wolstein Center (1,472); Cleveland, OH
*Non-conference game. ^{#}Rankings from AP Poll. (#) Tournament seedings in parentheses. VT=NIT Virginia Tech bracket. All times are in Eastern.
