= List of America East Conference champions =

This article is a list of America East Conference champions.

== Men's Cross Country ==
Year	Champion	Runner-Up
2025	UMass Lowell	Binghamton
2024	UMass Lowell	Maine
2023	UMass Lowell	Maine
2022	UMass Lowell	Binghamton
2021	UMass Lowell	Stony Brook
2020	UMass Lowell	Stony Brook
2019	Stony Brook	UMass Lowell
2018	UMass Lowell	Stony Brook
2017	Stony Brook	UMass Lowell
2016	Stony Brook	Maine
2015	UMass Lowell	Stony Brook
2014	Binghamton	UMass Lowell
2013	UMBC	Binghamton
2012	Stony Brook	New Hampshire
2011	Albany	Boston University
2010	Boston University	Binghamton
2009	Binghamton	New Hampshire
2008	New Hampshire	Stony Brook
2007	New Hampshire	Stony Brook
2006	New Hampshire	
2005	UMBC	
2004	Maine	
2003	New Hampshire	
2002	New Hampshire	
2001	New Hampshire	
2000	Boston University	
1999	New Hampshire	
1998	New Hampshire	
1997	Boston University	
1996	Boston University	
1995	Boston University	
1994	Boston University	
1993	Boston University	
1992	Boston University	
1991	Boston University	
1990	Boston University	
1989	Boston University	
1988	Northeastern	

== Women's Cross Country ==
Year	Champion
Year	Champion
2025	Maine
2024	New Hampshire
2023	Binghamton
2022	UMass Lowell
2021	UMass Lowell
2020	UMass Lowell
2019	New Hampshire
2018	Albany
2017	New Hampshire
2016	New Hampshire
2015	New Hampshire
2014	New Hampshire
2013	New Hampshire
2012	Stony Brook
2011	Stony Brook
2010	Stony Brook
2009	Stony Brook
2008	Stony Brook
2007	Stony Brook
2006	Boston University
2005	Boston University
2004	Boston University
2003	New Hampshire
2002	Boston University
2001	Boston University
2000	Boston University
1999	Boston University
1998	Boston University
1997	Boston University
1996	Boston University
1995	Delaware
1994	Boston University
1993	Boston University
1992	Boston University
1991	Boston University
1990	Boston University
1989	Vermont

== Field Hockey ==
Currently, field hockey is the only America East sport conducted in a divisional format. This was introduced for the 2015 season after four California schools joined the conference as single-sport associate members.

Year	Regular Season	Record	Tournament
2025	New Hampshire; Vermont	4–1	New Hampshire
2024	Albany	6–0	Vermont
2023	UMass Lowell; Albany	7–1	California
2022	Maine	8–0	Albany
2021	Maine	7–1	Maine
2020	Monmouth; Maine	7–1	Stanford
2019	East; Monmouth	5–0	Stanford
2019	West; Stanford	4–0	Stanford
2018	East; Albany	6–2	Albany
2018	West; Pacific; Stanford	5–1	Albany
2017	East; Albany; Maine	6–2	Stanford
2017	West; California; Pacific; Stanford	4–2	Stanford
2016	East; Albany	7–1	Stanford
2016	West; Pacific; Stanford	5–1	Stanford
2015	East; Albany; Maine	7–1	Albany
2015	West; Pacific; Stanford	4–2	Albany
2014	Albany	5–0	Albany
2013	New Hampshire	5–0	New Hampshire
2012	New Hampshire	5–0	Albany
2011	Boston University; New Hampshire	4–1	New Hampshire
2010	New Hampshire	5–0	Albany
2009	Albany	4–1	Boston University
2008	Albany	4–1	Albany
2007	Boston University	5–0	Boston University
2006	Boston University; Albany	4–1	Boston University
2005	Boston University; Maine	4–1	Boston University
2004	Boston University	6–0	Northeastern
2003	Northeastern	6–0	Northeastern
2002	Northeastern; New Hampshire	4–1	Northeastern
2001	Northeastern	9–0	Northeastern
2000	New Hampshire	7–1	Boston University
1999	Boston University	8–0	Boston University
1998	Northeastern	7–1	New Hampshire
1997	Northeastern	8–0	Northeastern
1996	Boston University	7–0–0	Northeastern
1995	Northeastern	8–0–0	Northeastern
1994	Delaware; Northeastern	5–1–0	Northeastern
1993	Boston University	5–1–0	Boston University
1992	Boston University	5–1–0	Northeastern
1991	Boston University	4–1–1	Boston University
1990	Boston University	3–0–1	Northeastern
1989	Boston University	3–1–0	Not held

== Men's Soccer ==
Year	Regular Season	Record	Tournament
2025	Vermont	6-0-1	Vermont
2024	Vermont; New Hampshire	4-1-2	Vermont
2023	New Hampshire	4-0-3	Bryant
2022	New Hampshire	6-1-0	New Hampshire
2021	New Hampshire	7-0-1	Vermont
2020	Pod A New Hampshire	5-0-1	New Hampshire
2020	Pod B Hartford	3-2-1	New Hampshire
2020	Pod C NJIT	4-2-0	New Hampshire
2019	New Hampshire; Vermont	5-1-1	New Hampshire
2018	Stony Brook	5-1-1	New Hampshire
2017	Vermont	5-1-1	Albany
2016	UMass Lowell	5-1-1	Albany
2015	Albany	5-2-0	Vermont
2014	UMBC	6-0-1	UMBC
2013	UMBC	5-0-2	UMBC
2012	Vermont	5-0-2	UMBC
2011	Boston University	5-2-0	Stony Brook
2010	Boston University	6-1-0	UMBC
2009	New Hampshire	6-0-1	Stony Brook
2008	Boston University	6-1-1	Boston University
2007	Binghamton	5-3-0	Vermont
2006	Binghamton	6-1-1	Binghamton
2005	Stony Brook	6-1-1	Stony Brook
2004	Boston University	6-2-1	Boston University
2003	UMBC	5-1-3	Binghamton
2002	Northeastern	6-2-0	Northeastern
2001	Boston University	9-1-1	Towson
2000	Northeastern	7-2-0	Vermont
1999	Hartford	6-1-2	Hartford
1998	Towson	8-1-0	Drexel
1997	Hofstra	9-0-0	Boston University
1996	Hartford	7-1-1	Boston University
1995	Drexel	6-1-2	Boston University
1994	Boston University; New Hampshire	6-0-1	Boston University
1993	Boston University	6-1-0	Boston University
1992	Boston University	7-0-0	Hartford
1991	Boston University	7-0-0	Hartford
1990	Boston University	4-0-1	Boston University
1989	Vermont	4-0-1	Hartford

== Women's Soccer ==
Year	Regular Season	Record	Tournament
2025	Binghamton	5-0-3	Maine
2024	Maine	7-0-1	Maine
2023	Binghamton	5-0-3	Maine
2022	Binghamton	6-1-1	New Hampshire
2021	Vermont	7-3-0	Vermont
2020	Division A UMass Lowell	4-0-0	Stony Brook
2020	Division B Stony Brook; Binghamton	4-1-0	Stony Brook
2019	Stony Brook; Albany	6-1-1	Stony Brook
2018	Hartford; Stony Brook	6-1-1	Albany
2017	New Hampshire	5-2-1	Stony Brook
2016	Albany; Hartford	6-1-1	Albany
2015	Hartford	4-1-3	Albany
2014	Hartford	5-1-2	New Hampshire
2013	UMBC	6-2	UMBC
2012	Boston University	8-0-0	Stony Brook
2011	Boston University	8-0-0	Boston University
2010	Boston University	8-0-0	Boston University
2009	Boston University	7-1-0	Boston University
2008	Boston University; New Hampshire	6-1-1	Boston University
2006	Hartford	6-0-2	Hartford
2005	Boston University	7-0-1	Boston University
2004	Binghamton	6-3-0	Binghamton
2003	Boston University	7-1-1	Boston University
2002	Hartford	6-2-0	Hartford
2001	Boston University	10-0-1	Boston University
2000	Boston University	9-0-0	Boston University
1999	Hartford	9-0-0	Hartford
1998	Hartford	9-0-0	Hartford
1997	Hartford	9-0-0	Hartford
1996	Vermont	7-0-0	Towson
1995	Hartford	6-0-0	Hartford
1994	Hartford	4-0-0	Hartford
1993	Hartford	3-0-1	Not held
1992	Hartford	4-0-0	Not held
1991	Hartford	4-0-0	Not held

== Volleyball ==
Year	Regular Season	Record	Tournament
2025	Bryant; UMBC	7-3	UMBC
2024	Binghamton	8-2	New Hampshire
2023	UMBC	8-2	UMBC
2022	Binghamton	8-2	UMBC
2021	UMBC	12-0	UMBC
2020	Albany; UMBC	9-3	UMBC
2019	Albany	9-1	Albany
2018	Stony Brook	12-0	Stony Brook
2017	Albany	11-1	Stony Brook
2016	New Hampshire	10-2	New Hampshire
2015	Albany; New Hampshire	11-1	New Hampshire
2014	New Hampshire	11-1	New Hampshire
2013	New Hampshire	12-2	New Hampshire
2012	Albany	10-2	Binghamton
2011	Albany	11-1	Albany
2010	Albany	10-2	Albany
2009	Albany	10-0	Binghamton
2008	Albany	12-0	Albany
2007	Stony Brook	11-1	Albany
2006	Albany	10-2	Albany
2005	Albany	11-1	Binghamton
2004	Albany	13-1	Albany
2003	New Hampshire	12-2	New Hampshire
2002	New Hampshire	11-1	New Hampshire
2001	Towson	13-1	Northeastern
2000	Hofstra	16-0	Hofstra
1999	Hofstra	13-1	Hofstra
1998	New Hampshire	14-0	New Hampshire
1997	Hofstra	12-2	Hofstra
1996	Towson	6-1	Hofstra
1995	Delaware	7-0	Hofstra
1994	Delaware	5-0	Delaware
1993	Hartford	4-0	Hartford
1992	Northeastern	3-1	Delaware
1991	Northeastern	4-0	Drexel

== Men's Basketball ==
Year	Regular Season	Record	Tournament
2024-25	Bryant	14-2	Bryant
2023-24	Vermont	15-1	Vermont
2022-23	Vermont	14-2	Vermont
2021-22	Vermont	17-1	Vermont
2020-21	UMBC; Vermont	10-4	Hartford
2019-20	Vermont	14-2	Vermont
2018-19	Vermont	14-2	Vermont
2017-18	Vermont	15-1	UMBC
2016-17	Vermont	16-0	Vermont
2015-16	Stony Brook	14-2	Stony Brook
2014–15	Albany	15–1	Albany
2013-14	Vermont	15-1	Albany
2012-13	Stony Brook	14-2	Albany
2011-12	Stony Brook	14-2	Vermont
2010-11	Vermont	13-3	Boston University
2009-10	Stony Brook	13-3	Vermont
2008-09	Binghamton; Vermont	13-3	Binghamton
2007-08	UMBC	13-3	UMBC
2006-07	Vermont	15-1	Albany
2005-06	Albany	13-3	Albany
2004-05	Vermont	16-2	Vermont
2003-04	Boston University	17-1	Vermont
2002-03	Boston University	13-3	Vermont
2001-02	Vermont	13-3	Boston University
2000-01	Hofstra	16-2	Hofstra
1999-2000	Hofstra	16-2	Hofstra
1998-99	Delaware; Drexel	15-3	Delaware
1997-98	Delaware; Boston University	12-6	Delaware
1996-97	Boston University	17-1	Boston University
1995-96	Drexel	17-1	Drexel
1994-95	Drexel	12-4	Drexel
1993-94	Drexel	12-2	Drexel
1992-93	Drexel	12-2	Delaware
1991-92	Delaware	14-0	Delaware
1990-91	Northeastern	8-2	Northeastern
1989-90	Northeastern; Boston University	9-3	Boston University
1988-89	Siena	16-1	Siena
1987-88	Siena	16-2	Boston University
1986-87	Northeastern	17-1	Northeastern
1985-86	Northeastern	16-2	Northeastern
1984-85	Canisius; Northeastern	13-3	Northeastern
1983-84	Northeastern	14-0	Northeastern
1982-83	Boston University	8-2	Boston University
1981-82	Northeastern	8-1	Northeastern
1980-81	Northeastern	21-5	Northeastern
1979-80	Boston University	19-7	Holy Cross

== Women's Basketball ==
Year	Regular Season	Record	Tournament
2024-25	Albany	14-2	Vermont
2023-24	Maine	14-2	Maine
2022-23	Vermont; Albany	14-2	Vermont
2021-22	Maine	15-3	Albany
2020-21	Maine	13-2	Stony Brook
2019-20	Stony Brook	14-2	Maine
2018-19	Maine	15-1	Maine
2017-18	Maine	13-3	Maine
2016-17	New Hampshire	15-1	Albany
2015-16	Albany; Maine	15-1	Albany
2014–15	Albany; Maine	14–2	Albany
2013-14	Albany	15-1	Albany
2012-13	Albany	16-0	Albany
2011-12	Boston University	15-1	Albany
2010-11	UMBC	13-3	Hartford
2009-10	Hartford	16-0	Vermont
2008-09	Boston University	16-0	Vermont
2007-08	Hartford	14-2	Hartford
2006-07	Hartford	15-1	UMBC
2005-06	Hartford	15-1	Hartford
2004-05	Maine	16-2	Hartford
2003-04	Maine	17-1	Maine
2002-03	Maine	16-0	Boston University
2001-02	Vermont	14-2	Hartford
2000-01	Delaware	17-1	Delaware
1999-2000	Vermont	15-3	Vermont
1998-99	Maine	17-1	Northeastern
1997-98	Vermont	15-3	Maine
1996-97	Maine	17-1	Maine
1995-96	Maine	18-0	Maine
1994-95	Maine	14-2	Maine
1993-94	Maine	12-2	Vermont
1992-93	Vermont	14-0	Vermont
1991-92	Vermont	14-0	Vermont
1990-91	Maine	9-1	Maine
1989-90	Maine	11-1	Maine
1988-89	Maine	13-1	Boston University
1987-88	Boston University; Maine	12-2	Boston University
1986-87	Northeastern	12-2	Northeastern
1985-86	Northeastern	10-2	Northeastern
1984-85	Northeastern; New Hampshire	4-1	Northeastern

== Men's Swimming and Diving ==
Year	Champion
2024-25	Binghamton
2023-24	Binghamton
2022-23	UMBC
2021-22	UMBC
2020-21	Binghamton
2019-20	UMBC
2018-19	UMBC
2017-18	UMBC
2012-13	UMBC
2011-12	Boston University
2010-11	UMBC
2009-10	UMBC
2008-09	UMBC
2007-08	UMBC
2006-07	UMBC
2005-06	UMBC
2004-05	UMBC
2003-04	UMBC
2002-03	Binghamton
2001-02	Boston University
2000-01	Drexel
1999-2000	Delaware
1998-99	Delaware
1997-98	Delaware
1996-97	Delaware
1995-96	Northeastern
1994-95	Northeastern
1993-94	Boston University
1992-93	Drexel
1991-92	Drexel
1990-91	Boston University

== Women's Swimming and Diving ==
Year	Champion
2024-25	New Hampshire
2023-24	Vermont
2022-23	New Hampshire
2021-22	New Hampshire
2020-21	New Hampshire
2019-20	New Hampshire
2018-19	UMBC
2017-18	New Hampshire
2016-17	UMBC
2015-16	UMBC
2014-15	UMBC
2013-14	New Hampshire
2012-13	New Hampshire
2011-12	Boston University
2010-11	UMBC
2009-10	Boston University
2008-09	Boston University
2007-08	UMBC
2006-07	UMBC
2005-06	New Hampshire
2004-05	New Hampshire
2003-04	Northeastern
2002-03	Northeastern
2001-02	Northeastern
2000-01	Northeastern
1999-2000	Northeastern
1998-99	New Hampshire
1997-98	New Hampshire
1996-97	Delaware
1995-96	Delaware
1994-95	Boston University
1993-94	Boston University
1992-93	Northeastern
1991-92	Boston University
1990-91	Boston University

== Men's Indoor Track and Field ==
Year	Champion
2024-25	Albany
2023-24	Albany
2022-23	UMass Lowell
2021-22	UMass Lowell
2019-20	Albany
2018-19	Albany
2017-18	UMass Lowell
2015-16	Albany
2014-15	Albany
2012-13	Albany
2011-12	Albany
2010-11	Albany
2009-10	Albany
2008-09	Albany
2007-08	Albany
2006-07	Albany
2005-06	Albany
2004-05	Northeastern
2003-04	Albany
2002-03	Albany
2001-02	Northeastern
2000-01	Northeastern
1999-2000	Northeastern
1998-99	Delaware
1997-98	New Hampshire
1996-97	New Hampshire
1995-96	Northeastern
1994-95	New Hampshire
1993-94	Northeastern
1992-93	Delaware
1991-92	Northeastern
1990-91	Northeastern
1989-90	Northeastern
1988-89	Northeastern

== Women's Indoor Track and Field ==
Year	Champion
2024-25	Albany
2023-24	Albany
2022-23	UMass Lowell
2021-22	Albany
2019-20	Albany
2018-19	Albany
2017-18	Albany
2016-17	Albany
2015-16	Albany
2014-15	Albany
2013-14	Albany
2012-13	Albany
2011-12	Boston University
2010-11	Albany
2009-10	Albany
2008-09	Boston University
2007-08	Boston University
2006-07	Boston University
2005-06	Boston University
2004-05	Northeastern
2003-04	Northeastern
2002-03	Northeastern
2001-02	Boston University
2000-01	Vermont
1999-2000	Boston University
1998-99	Boston University
1997-98	Northeastern
1996-97	Boston University
1995-96	Northeastern
1994-95	Northeastern
1993-94	Northeastern
1992-93	Northeastern
1991-92	Boston University
1990-91	Boston University
1989-90	Boston University

== Baseball ==
Year	Regular Season	Record	Tournament
2025	Bryant	18-6	Binghamton
2024	Bryant	17-7	Bryant
2023	Maine	19-5	Maine
2022	Maine; Stony Brook	21-9	Binghamton
2021	Stony Brook	25-10	NJIT
2019	Stony Brook	15-9	Stony Brook
2018	Hartford	16-8	Hartford
2017	Binghamton	15-4	UMBC
2016	Binghamton	19-5	Binghamton
2015	Stony Brook	18-4-1	Stony Brook
2014	Stony Brook	18-5	Binghamton
2013	Maine	20-9	Binghamton
2012	Stony Brook	21-3	Stony Brook
2011	Stony Brook	22-2	Maine
2010	Binghamton	21-3	Stony Brook
2009	Binghamton	13-7	Binghamton
2008	Binghamton	15-8	Stony Brook
2007	Binghamton	17-5	Albany
2006	Vermont	16-8	Maine
2005	Northeastern	14-6	Maine
2004	Northeastern	14-6	Stony Brook
2003	Vermont	17-5	Northeastern
2002	Maine	16-6	Maine
2001	Delaware	22-6	Delaware
2000	Delaware	19-5	Delaware
1999	Towson	20-7	Delaware
1998	Delaware	22-2	Delaware
1997	Delaware	19-3	Northeastern
1996	Delaware	19-5	Delaware
1995	Delaware	19-3	Delaware
1994	Delaware	20-4	Northeastern
1993	Maine	22-4	Maine
1992	Delaware	20-8	Delaware
1991	Maine	14-1	Maine

== Men's Golf ==
Note: The 1997, 1998 and 1999 tournaments were contested in the fall of that academic year, instead of the usual spring tournament. Therefore, these titles were actually awarded in 1996, 1997 and 1998, respectively.
Note: America East disbanded Men's Golf after the 2007 season.

Year	Champion
2007	Hartford
2006	Hartford
2005	Binghamton
2004	Hartford
2003	Binghamton
2002	Hartford
2001	Hartford
2000	Towson
1999	Towson
1998	Delaware
1997	Towson
1996	Towson
1995	Hartford
1994	Hartford
1993	Hartford
1992	Hartford
1991	Hartford
1990	Not held
1989	Hartford
1988	Hartford

== Women's Golf ==
Note: America East disbanded Women's Golf after the 2009 season.

Year	Champion
2009	Albany
2008	Albany
2007	Boston University
2006	Boston University
2005	Hartford
2004	Albany

== Men's Lacrosse ==
Year	Regular Season	Record	Tournament
2025	Bryant; UMBC	5-1	Albany
2024	Albany	6-1	Albany
2023	Vermont	7-0	Bryant
2022	Vermont	6-0	Vermont
2021	UMBC; Vermont	7-2	Vermont
2019	Stony Brook	5-1	UMBC
2018	Albany; Stony Brook	5-1	Albany
2017	Albany	6-0	Albany
2016	Albany	5-0	Hartford
2015	Albany	6-0	Albany
2014	Albany	5-0	Albany
2013	Albany	5-0	Albany
2012	Stony Brook	4-1	Stony Brook
2011	Stony Brook	5-0	Hartford
2010	Stony Brook	5-0	Stony Brook
2009	Stony Brook; UMBC	4-1	UMBC
2008	UMBC	5-0	UMBC
2007	Albany	4-1	Albany
2006	UMBC	5-0	UMBC
2005	UMBC	5-1	Albany
2004	Binghamton	6-0	Albany
2003	Albany; Hartford	4-1	Albany
2002	Albany	5-0	Stony Brook
2001	Towson	5-0	Towson
2000	Hofstra; Delaware; Hartford	4-1	Hofstra
1999	Delaware	5-0	Not held
1998	Hofstra	5-0	Not held
1997	Hofstra	6-0	Not held
1996	Hofstra	5-0	Not held
1995	Hofstra	5-0	Not held
1994	Delaware	4-0	Not held

== Women's Lacrosse ==
Year	Regular Season	Record	Tournament
2025	Bryant; UMass Lowell	5-1	Albany
2024	Binghamton; Albany	5-1	Binghamton
2023	Albany	6-0	Albany
2022	Stony Brook	6-0	Vermont
2021	Stony Brook	8-0	Stony Brook
2019	Stony Brook	7-0	Stony Brook
2018	Stony Brook	7-0	Stony Brook
2017	Stony Brook	6-0	Stony Brook
2016	Stony Brook	6-0	Stony Brook
2015	Stony Brook	6-0	Stony Brook
2014	Stony Brook; Albany	4-1	Stony Brook
2013	Stony Brook	6-0	Stony Brook
2012	Boston University	6-0	Albany
2011	Albany	6-0	Albany
2010	Albany	6-0	Boston University
2009	Boston University	6-0	Boston University
2008	Boston University	6-0	Boston University
2007	Stony Brook	5-1	Boston University
2006	Boston University; UMBC	5-1	Boston University
2005	Boston University	6-0	Boston University
2004	New Hampshire	6-0	New Hampshire
2003	Boston University	5-0	Boston University
2002	New Hampshire	4-0	Boston University
2001	Hofstra	6-0	Hofstra
2000	Boston University	6-0	Boston University
1999	Delaware	6-0	Delaware
1998	Delaware	6-0	Delaware
1997	Towson	6-0	Delaware
1996	Hofstra	5-0	Hofstra

== Softball ==
Year	Regular Season	Record	Tournament
2025	Binghamton	16-2	Binghamton
2024	Albany; Binghamton	14-6	Albany
2023	UMBC	15-4	UMBC
2022	UMBC; Stony Brook	12-6	UMBC
2021	UMBC	11-5	UMBC
2019	UMass Lowell	15-3	UMBC
2018	Albany	13-4	Albany
2017	Binghamton	11-4	Albany
2016	Binghamton	14-3	Maine
2015	Stony Brook	14-2	Binghamton
2014	Stony Brook	15-2	Albany
2013	Albany	15-2	Stony Brook
2012	Boston University	15-3	Boston University
2011	Albany; Boston University	14-4	Albany
2010	Boston University	14-3	Boston University
2009	Stony Brook	15-5	Boston University
2008	Albany	17-5	Stony Brook
2007	Boston University	17-3	Albany
2006	Maine	16-5	Albany
2005	Albany	17-2	Albany
2004	Albany	17-2	Maine
2003	Boston University	17-3	Boston University
2002	Boston University	19-3	Boston University
2001	Boston University	21-5	Hofstra
2000	Hofstra	22-4	Hofstra
1999	Hofstra	11-3	Hofstra
1998	Hofstra	9-3	Hofstra
1997	Hofstra	12-0	Boston University
1996	Hofstra	12-0	Boston University
1995	Hofstra	10-1	Hofstra
1994	Maine	7-1	Maine
1993	Boston University	8-0	Boston University
1992	Drexel	9-1	Boston University

== Men's Tennis ==
Note: The 1988, 1989 and 1990 tournaments were held in the fall of their respective academic years. Starting in 1991, the season was contested over a full academic year, and the tournaments were held in the spring.

Year	Champion
2012-13	Binghamton
2011-12	Binghamton
2010-11	Binghamton
2009-10	Binghamton
2008-09	Binghamton
2007-08	Binghamton
2006-07	UMBC
2005-06	Stony Brook
2004-05	Binghamton
2003-04	Binghamton
2002-03	Binghamton
2001-02	Hartford
2000-01	Hofstra
1999-2000	Hofstra
1998-99	Hofstra
1997-98	Towson
1996-97	Delaware
1995-96	Boston University
1994-95	Hartford
1993-94	Boston University
1992-93	Boston University
1991-92	Vermont
1990	Hartford
1989	Hartford
1988	Boston University

== Women's Tennis ==
Note: Until 1998, the tournament was held in the fall of the respective academic years. Starting in 1998, the season was contested over a full academic year, and the tournaments were held in the spring.

Year	Champion
2012-13	Stony Brook
2011-12	Stony Brook
2010-11	Boston University
2009-10	Boston University
2008-09	Boston University
2007-08	Boston University
2006-07	Boston University
2005-06	Boston University
2004-05	Boston University
2003-04	Boston University
2002-03	Boston University
2001-02	Boston University
2000-01	Boston University
1999-2000	Boston University
1998-99	Boston University
1997	Boston University
1996	Boston University
1995	Boston University
1994	Boston University
1993	Vermont
1992	Boston University
1991	Boston University
1990	Boston University
1989	Boston University

== Men's Outdoor Track and Field ==
Year	Champion
Year	Champion
2025	Albany
2024	UMass Lowell
2023	UMass Lowell
2022	Albany
2021	Albany
2019	Albany
2018	Albany
2017	Albany
2016	Albany
2015	Albany
2013	Albany
2012	Albany
2011	Albany
2010	Albany
2009	Albany
2008	Albany
2007	Albany
2006	Albany
2005	Albany
2004	Northeastern
2003	Albany
2002	Northeastern
2001	Northeastern
2000	Delaware
1999	New Hampshire
1998	New Hampshire
1997	New Hampshire
1996	New Hampshire
1995	Maine
1994	Delaware
1993	Delaware
1992	Northeastern
1991	Northeastern
1990	Northeastern
1989	Northeastern

== Women's Outdoor Track and Field ==
Year	Champion
2025	Albany
2024	Albany
2023	Albany
2022	Albany
2021	Albany
2019	Albany
2018	Albany
2017	Albany
2016	Albany
2015	Albany
2013	Albany
2012	Albany
2011	Albany
2010	Albany
2009	Albany
2008	Boston University
2007	Albany
2006	Albany
2005	Northeastern
2004	Northeastern
2003	Northeastern
2002	Northeastern
2001	Vermont
2000	Vermont
1999	Northeastern
1998	Northeastern
1997	Northeastern
1996	Northeastern
1995	Northeastern
1994	Northeastern
1993	Boston University
1992	Northeastern
1991	Northeastern
1990	Boston University
1989	Vermont
