= 2010–11 Stony Brook Seawolves men's basketball team =

American college basketball season

2010–11 Stony Brook Seawolves men's basketball
- Conference: America East Conference
- Record: 15–17 (8–8 America East)
- Head coach: Steve Pikiell (6th season)
- Assistant coaches: Jay Young (6th season); Lamar Chapman; Dan Rickard
- Home arena: Stony Brook Arena, Pritchard Gymnasium

The 2010–11 Stony Brook Seawolves men's basketball team represented Stony Brook University in the America East Conference. They were coached by Steve Pikiell, who was currently on his sixth year as a coach for Stony Brook. Stony Brook entered the year as the defending America East regular season champions after a year of school records and successes in the basketball program. Stony Brook currently competed at home in the Pritchard Gymnasium (Stony Brook Arena under renovations). The Seawolves were 2nd place (57pts) in the America East preseason poll behind a close first-place BU (62pts). The Seawolves received their largest broadcasting package in school history for the 2010–11 season including four games with the ESPN family of networks, and a series of games with MSG+.

2010–11 America East men's basketball standings
	Conf.				Overall
Team	W		L	PCT	W		L	PCT
Vermont	13	–	3	.813	23	–	9	.719
Boston University†	12	–	4	.750	21	–	14	.600
Maine	9	–	7	.563	15	–	15	.500
Albany	9	–	7	.563	16	–	16	.500
Stony Brook	8	–	8	.500	15	–	17	.469
Hartford	7	–	9	.438	11	–	20	.355
New Hampshire	6	–	10	.375	12	–	18	.400
Binghamton	4	–	12	.250	8	–	23	.258
UMBC	4	–	12	.250	5	–	25	.167
† 2011 America East tournament winner As of March 18, 2011; Rankings from AP Poll

== Preseason ==
=== Recruitment ===
College recruiting information
Name	Hometown	School	Height	Weight	Commit date
David Coley; SG	Brooklyn, NY	Thomas Jefferson	6 ft 2 in (1.88 m)	180 lb (82 kg)	
David Coley; SG	Recruit ratings: (83)				
Anthony Jackson; PG	Columbus, OH	Gahanna Lincoln	5 ft 11 in (1.80 m)	180 lb (82 kg)	
Anthony Jackson; PG	Recruit ratings: (83)				
Al Rapier; SF	Chicago, Il	Mineral Aerial College	6 ft 7 in (2.01 m)	220 lb (100 kg)	
Al Rapier; SF	Recruit ratings: (40)				
Anthony Mayo; F	Philadelphia, PA	Roman Catholic	6 ft 9 in (2.06 m)	210 lb (95 kg)	
Anthony Mayo; F	Recruit ratings: No ratings found				
Overall recruit ranking:
Note: In many cases, Scout, Rivals, 247Sports, On3, and ESPN may conflict in their listings of height and weight.; In these cases, the average was taken. ESPN grades are on a 100-point scale.; Sources: "2010 Team Ranking". Rivals.

== Roster ==
2010–11 Stony Brook Seawolves men's basketball team
Players
Coaches

Pos.	#	Name	Height	Weight	Year	Hometown
G/F	1	Preye Preboye	6 ft 6 in (1.98 m)	220 lb (100 kg)	So	Springfield, MA
F	2	Danny Carter	6 ft 9 in (2.06 m)	225 lb (102 kg)	Jr	Windsor, England
G	4	Anthony Jackson	6 ft 0 in (1.83 m)	180 lb (82 kg)	Fr	Columbus, Ohio
G	5	Dave Coley	6 ft 2 in (1.88 m)	180 lb (82 kg)	Fr	Brooklyn, NY
G	10	Bryan Dougher	6 ft 1 in (1.85 m)	190 lb (86 kg)	Jr	Scotch Plains, NJ
G	11	Ben Resner	6 ft 3 in (1.91 m)	185 lb (84 kg)	So	Farmingdale, NY
G	12	Marcus Rouse	6 ft 0 in (1.83 m)	170 lb (77 kg)	So	Upper Marlboro, MD
G	12	Leonard Hayes	6 ft 4 in (1.93 m)	185 lb (84 kg)	So	Voorhees, NJ
F	21	Al Rapier	6 ft 7 in (2.01 m)	220 lb (100 kg)	Jr	Chicago, Il
F	22	Eric McAlister	6 ft 8 in (2.03 m)	215 lb (98 kg)	RS Fr	Hightstown, NJ
F	23	Dallis Joyner	6 ft 7 in (2.01 m)	270 lb (122 kg)	Jr	Norfolk, Va
G/F	24	Tommy Brenton (injured)	6 ft 5 in (1.96 m)	270 lb (122 kg)	Jr	Columbia, MD
G	30	Chris Martin	6 ft 1 in (1.85 m)	205 lb (93 kg)	Sr	Springfield Gardens, NY
F	32	Anthony Mayo	6 ft 9 in (2.06 m)	210 lb (95 kg)	Fr	Philadelphia, PA

Head coach

- Steve Pikiell

Assistant coach(es)

- Jay Young (Marist)
- Lamar Chapman
- Dan Rickard

Legend

- (C) Team captain
- (S) Suspended
- (I) Ineligible
- (W) Walk-on
- Injured
- Current redshirt

Roster
Last update: December 20, 2010

== Coaching ==
Name	Type	College	Graduating year
Steve Pikiell	Head coach	Connecticut	1990
Jay Young	Associate head coach	Marist	1986
Lamar Chapman	Assistant coach	Lane	1993
Dan Rickard	Assistant coach	Stony Brook	2004
Ricky Lucas	Director of Basketball Operations	Stony Brook	2008

== Season ==
The 2010–2011 season started with a season opener game against the Connecticut Huskies at the Gampel Pavilion resulting in a 79–52 loss to the eventual national champions. The Seawolves then opened their home season two days later with an 80–43 win against Division III Mount Ida. The Seawolves posted a second straight win at Monmouth on for a 51–49 end of the game for their first ever national broadcast on ESPN (College Tip-off Marathon). The Seawolves went on to win their third straight with a 66–59 over Fairleigh Dickinson. Coming back home the Seawolves played against Wagner, losing a close 58–54 game in which free-throws percentage largely affected the team. After the lost against Wagner, the Seawolves hosted Lehigh at the Gymnasium and at one point in the second half held to a 14-point lead, however, a late run by Lehigh allowed the team to get tie and eventually beat the Seawolves on overtime by a score of 79–76. The Seawolves then traveled to New York, NY to play a match up against the Columbia Lions, a game which the Seawolves lost by a score of 73–72 which resulted in the third straight lost by the Seawolves by four or less points, and the second straight lost in which the Seawolves held substantial leads in the second half but weren't able to close it. The Seawolves then traveled to Holy Cross to play a game which also resulted to be very close but which ended on Seawolves favor with a game winning layup by Dave Coley with a second of regulation to capture the Seawolves fourth win of the season, a score of 54–53. The Seawolves battled Sacred Heart but fell at home to a score of 75–66 and then traveled to South Bend, Indiana to face off against No. 24 Notre Dame, their second Big East team of the season. Seawolves battled Notre Dame for most of the first half keeping a score of 29–26 but allowed an 8–0 run to end the half leading to an eventual 88–62 loss.

The Seawolves opened conference play with a win against UMBC and continued throughout the season with struggles in the offensive end and with injuries affecting their sole senior Chris Martin and other players for most of the season. Due to injuries, Pikiell resorted to using the bench more often allowing for Sophomore like Leonard Hayes to get more playing time. Hayes was able to show his potential, entering the starting five and showing his improvement in the conference tournament. Overall, Stony Brook ended the regular season with a 13–16 record and 8–8 in the America East and headed to the tournament as the number fifth seed. In their quarterfinal match against Albany the Seawolves were able to use strong defense and a stellar offense to drag a 67–61 win against Albany at Hartford against an opponent that swept them in the regular season. The Semifinals then played the next day against No. 1 Vermont ending in a surprising offensive effort by Stony Brook, who led from the beginning to the end, to capture a 69–47 promising win against a Vermont team who also swept them in the regular season. For the first time in Stony Brook's Division I program history, the Seawolves were to participate in the America East championship game. Their next match up was announced to be the No. 2 Boston Terriers. On March 12 the Championship was hosted at Agganis Arena at Boston. Again, Stony Brook showed a strong first half outing and a strong defense for most of game and held to a lead of up to 15 points. However, with less than a minute in the clock the terriers tied the game thanks to the John Holland (America East POY), and then captured the lead with a decisive foul on Stony Brook with 2 seconds of regulation left. Boston went on to win 56–54 to end the Seawolves hopes for their first-ever NCAA tournament bid.

== Schedule ==
Date time, TV	Rank^{#}	Opponent^{#}	Result	Record	Site (attendance) city, state
Regular season
11/12/2010*; 7:00pm, SNY, MASN		at Connecticut	L 52–79	0–1	Gampel Pavilion (8,319); Storrs, CT
11/14/2010*; 2:00pm		Mount Ida	W 80–43	1–1	Pritchard Gymnasium (1,025); Stony Brook, NY
11/16/2010*; 6:00am, ESPN		at Monmouth; ESPN Tip-Off Marathon	W 51–49	2–1	Multipurpose Activity Center (2,308); West Long Branch, NJ
11/18/2010*; 7:00pm		at Fairleigh Dickinson	W 66–59	3–1	Rothman Center (690); Hackensack, NJ
11/21/2010*; 2:00pm, MSG+		Wagner	L 54–58	3–2	Pritchard Gymnasium (1,156); Stony Brook, NY
12/01/2010*; 7:00pm		Lehigh	L 76–79 ^{OT}	3–3	Pritchard Gymnasium (1,118); Stony Brook, NY
12/04/2010*; 4:00pm		at Columbia	L 72–73	3–4	Levien Gymnasium (658); New York, NY
12/07/2010*; 7:00pm		at Holy Cross	W 54–53	4–4	Hart Center (1,084); Worcester, MA
12/11/2010*; 2:00pm, MSG+		Sacred Heart	L 66–75	4–5	Pritchard Gymnasium (1,237); Stony Brook, NY
12/19/2010*; 4:30pm, ESPNU		at No. 24 Notre Dame	L 62–88	4–6	Edmund P. Joyce Center (6,211); Notre Dame, IN
12/29/2010*; 7:00pm		Wagner	W 63–54	5–6	Pritchard Gymnasium (1,630); Stony Brook, NY
01/02/2011; 7:00pm		at UMBC	W 64–56	6–6 (1–0)	Retriever Activities Center (1,216); Catonsville, MD
01/04/2011; 7:00pm		Vermont	L 49–55	6–7 (1–1)	Pritchard Gymnasium (1,161); Stony Brook, NY
01/08/2011*; 7:00pm		at Cornell	L 52–60	6–8	Newman Arena (1,679); Ithaca, NY
01/10/2011; 7:00pm, MSG+, ESPN3		at Binghamton	L 50–57	6–9 (1–2)	Binghamton University Events Center (2,297); Vestal, NY
01/15/2011; 2:00pm		New Hampshire	W 64–60 ^{2OT}	7–9 (2–2)	Pritchard Gymnasium (1,065); Stony Brook, NY
01/17/2011; 5:00pm, MSG+, ESPN3		Albany	L 50–52	7–10 (2–3)	Pritchard Gymnasium (1,630); Stony Brook, NY
01/20/2011; 7:30pm		at Boston University	L 62–67	7–11 (2–4)	Agganis Arena (877); Boston, MA
01/22/2011; 7:00pm		at Maine	L 59–70	7–12 (2–5)	Alfond Arena (1,948); Orono, ME
01/29/2011; 3:00pm		Hartford	W 69–35	8–12 (3–5)	Pritchard Gymnasium (1,184); Stony Brook, NY
01/31/2011; 7:00pm		UMBC	W 69–59	9–12 (4–5)	Pritchard Gymnasium (1,255); Stony Brook, NY
02/04/2011; 7:00pm		Boston University	L 49–62	9–13 (4–6)	Pritchard Gymnasium (1,630); Stony Brook, NY
02/06/2011; 1:00pm		at Vermont	L 42–65	9–14 (4–7)	Patrick Gym (2,617); Burlington, VT
02/09/2011; 7:00pm		at New Hampshire	W 63–56	10–14 (5–7)	Lundholm Gym (611); Durham, NH
02/12/2011; 7:00pm, ESPNU		Maine	W 71–69 ^{OT}	11–14 (6–7)	Stony Brook Arena (4,423); Stony Brook, NY
02/14/2011; 7:00pm, MSG+, ESPN3		at Albany	L 43–58	11–15 (6–8)	SEFCU Arena (1,728); Albany, NY
02/19/2011*; 2:00pm		Manhattan; ESPN BracketBusters	L 63–64 ^{OT}	11–16	Pritchard Gymnasium (1,630); Stony Brook, NY
02/23/2011; 7:00pm		at Hartford	W 79–73 ^{OT}	12–16 (7–8)	Chase Arena at R.F.P (1,458); Hartford, CT
02/27/2011; 2:00pm		Binghamton	W 67–42	13–16 (8–8)	Pritchard Gymnasium (1,630); Stony Brook, NY
America East tournament
03/05/2011; 12:00PM	(5)	vs. (4) Albany; America East Quarterfinals	W 67–61	14–16	Chase Arena at R.F.P (1,913); Hartford, CT
03/06/2011; 5:00pm, ESPN3	(5)	vs. (1) Vermont; America East Semifinals	W 69–47	15–16	Chase Arena at R.F.P (2,169); Hartford, CT
03/12/2011; 12:00pm, ESPN2	(5)	at (2) Boston University; America East Championship Game	L 54–56	15–17	Agganis Arena (3,845); Boston, MA
*Non-conference game. ^{#}Rankings from AP Poll. (#) Tournament seedings in parentheses.
