= List of Marist Red Foxes men's basketball head coaches =

The following is a list of Marist Red Foxes men's basketball head coaches. The Red Foxes have had 8 coaches in their 40-season history across Division I. The team is currently coached by John Dunne.

Tenure	Coach	Years	Overall Record	Pct.	Conf Record	Pct.	Conf Champs	Conf Tour Champs	NCAA Appear	NIT Appear	Notes
1981–1984	Ron Petro	3	40–44	.476	21–24	.467	0	0	0	0	
1984–1986	Matt Furjanic	2	36–24	.600	22–8	.733	1	1	1	0	
1986–2004	Dave Magarity	18	253–259	.494	168–144	.538	3	1	1	1	Coach of the Year: 1987, 1995, 2002
2004–2008	Matt Brady	4	73–50	.593	45–27	.625	1	0	0	1	Coach of the Year: 2007
2008–2013	Chuck Martin	5	41–118	.258	21–69	.233	0	0	0	0	
2013–2014	Jeff Bower	1	12–19	.387	9–11	.450	0	0	0	0	
2014–2018	Mike Maker	4	28–97	.224	18–60	.231	0	0	0	0	
2018–present	John Dunne	4*	45–67	.402	32–44	.421	0	0	0	0	
