= 2010–11 Marist Red Foxes men's basketball team =

American college basketball season

2010–11 Marist Red Foxes men's basketball
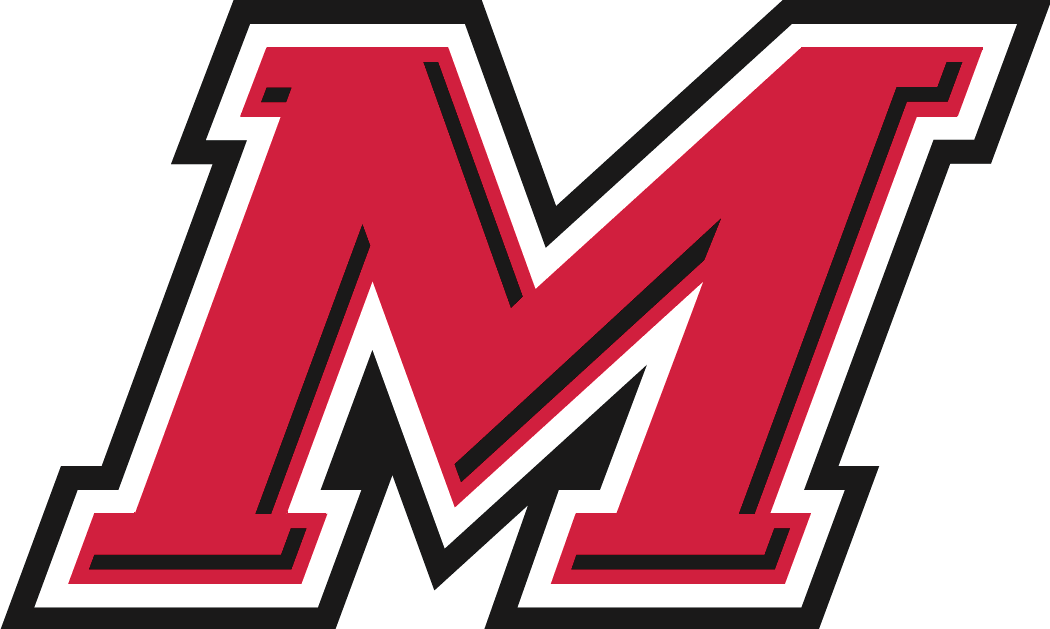
- Conference: Metro Atlantic Athletic Conference
- Record: 6–27 (3–15 MAAC)
- Head coach: Chuck Martin (3rd season)
- Assistant coaches: Will Lanier; Paul Lee
- Home arena: McCann Center

2010–11 MAAC men's basketball standings
	Conf.				Overall
Team	W		L	PCT	W		L	PCT
Fairfield	15	–	3	.833	25	–	8	.758
Iona	13	–	5	.722	25	–	12	.676
Rider	13	–	5	.722	23	–	11	.676
Saint Peter's †	11	–	7	.611	20	–	14	.588
Loyola (MD)	10	–	8	.556	15	–	15	.500
Canisius	9	–	9	.500	15	–	15	.500
Siena	8	–	10	.444	13	–	18	.419
Niagara	5	–	13	.278	9	–	23	.281
Marist	3	–	15	.167	6	–	27	.182
Manhattan	3	–	15	.167	6	–	25	.194
† 2011 MAAC tournament winner Rankings from AP Poll

The 2010–11 Marist Red Foxes men's basketball team represented Marist College during the 2010–11 NCAA Division I men's basketball season. The Red Foxes, led by third year head coach Chuck Martin, played their home games at the McCann Center and were members of the Metro Atlantic Athletic Conference. They finished the season 6–27, 3–15 in MAAC play to finish ninth place. They lost in the quarterfinals of the MAAC tournament to Fairfield.

== Previous season ==
The Red Foxes finished the 2009–10 season 1–29, 1–17 in MAAC play to finish in last place. As the No. 10 seed in the MAAC tournament, they lost in first round to Canisius.

== Roster ==
2010–11 Marist Red Foxes men's basketball team
Players
Coaches

Pos.	#	Name	Height	Weight	Year	Previous school	Hometown
G	0	Devin Price	6 ft 1 in (1.85 m)	170 lb (77 kg)	So	St. Bernard Catholic (CA)	Inglewood, California
G/F	1	Dorvell Carter	6 ft 6 in (1.98 m)	200 lb (91 kg)	RS So	Rice (NY)	Bronx, New York
F	2	Rob Johnson	6 ft 8 in (2.03 m)	220 lb (100 kg)	So	Edison Prep (NJ)	Roswell, Georgia
G	3	Sam Prescott	6 ft 3 in (1.91 m)	185 lb (84 kg)	So	Imhotep Charter	Philadelphia, Pennsylvania
G	4	Pat McDerby	6 ft 0 in (1.83 m)	170 lb (77 kg)	Sr	South Side HS (NY)	Rockville Centre, New York
G	5	R.J. Hall	5 ft 10 in (1.78 m)	165 lb (75 kg)	Jr	Bloomfield Tech	East Orange, New Jersey
G	11	Dejuan Goodwin	6 ft 2 in (1.88 m)	177 lb (80 kg)	Sr	Mount St. Joseph	Baltimore, Maryland
G	14	George Dallas (W)	5 ft 9 in (1.75 m)	165 lb (75 kg)	Jr	Roosevelt HS	Bronx, New York
F	15	Anell Alexis	6 ft 6 in (1.98 m)	185 lb (84 kg)	Fr	St. Benedict's Prep	Hillsborough, New Jersey
G/F	20	Jay Bowie	6 ft 5 in (1.96 m)	210 lb (95 kg)	Fr	Tampa Prep	Tampa, Florida
G	21	Candin Rusin	6 ft 4 in (1.93 m)	190 lb (86 kg)	So	Topsail High School	Wilmington, Vermont
F	34	Pieter Prinsloo	6 ft 10 in (2.08 m)	225 lb (102 kg)	Fr	Dover (DE)	Johannesburg, South Africa
F	41	Korey Bauer	6 ft 9 in (2.06 m)	225 lb (102 kg)	Sr	Whitehall	Whitehall, Pennsylvania
F	42	Menelik Watson	6 ft 8 in (2.03 m)	270 lb (122 kg)	Fr	Burnage HS	Manchester, England
F	50	Adam Kemp	6 ft 10 in (2.08 m)	235 lb (107 kg)	Fr	Winchendon (MA)	Sherrill, New York

Head coach

- Chuck Martin (Monmouth, 3rd yr., 1993)

Assistant coach(es)

- Paul Lee (Columbia, 3rd yr., 1986)
- Will Lanier (Georgia Tech, 3rd yr., 2004)

Legend

- (C) Team captain
- (S) Suspended
- (I) Ineligible
- (W) Walk-on
- Injured
- Current redshirt

Roster
Last update: 2015-02-10

== Schedule and results ==
Date time, TV	Rank^{#}	Opponent^{#}	Result	Record	Site (attendance) city, state
Regular season
Nov 16, 2010*; 5:30 pm, ESPNU		at No. 6 Villanova; NIT Season Tip-Off	L 47–84	0–1	The Pavilion (6,500); Villanova, Pennsylvania
Nov 17, 2010*; 5:30 pm		vs. George Washington; NIT Season Tip-Off	L 59–79	0–2	The Pavilion; Villanova, Pennsylvania
Nov 19, 2010*; 7:00 pm		at Boston University	L 37–58	0–3	Case Gym (947); Boston, MA
Nov 22, 2010*; 4:30 pm		vs. Belmont; NIT Season Tip-Off	L 74–102	0–4	Lawrence Joel Veterans Memorial Coliseum (158); Winston-Salem, NC
Nov 23, 2010*; 7:00 pm		at Wake Forest; NIT Season Tip-Off	L 59–81	0–5	Lawrence Joel Veterans Memorial Coliseum (3,418); Winston-Salem, NC
Nov 27, 2010*; 7:30 pm		UC Irvine	L 56–77	0–6	McCann Center (1,586); Poughkeepsie, NY
Dec 3, 2010; 7:30 pm		Niagara	W 80–72	1–6 (1–0)	McCann Center (2,018); Poughkeepsie, NY
Dec 5, 2010; 4:00 pm		Canisius	W 74–64	2–6 (2–0)	McCann Center (1,615); Poughkeepsie, NY
Dec 7, 2010*; 7:30 pm		at Rutgers	L 48–64	2–7	Louis Brown Athletic Center (3,826); Piscataway, NJ
Dec 10, 2010*; 7:30 pm		Lehigh	L 78–91	2–8	McCann Center (1,717); Poughkeepsie, NY
Dec 12, 2010*; 1:00 pm		at Vermont	L 67–75	2–9	Patrick Gym (2,148); Burlington, VT
Dec 19, 2010*; 4:00 pm		Holy Cross	L 57–75	2–10	McCann Center (1,369); Poughkeepsie, NY
Dec 29, 2019*; 7:30 pm		Penn	W 66–57	3–10	McCann Center (1,367); Poughkeepsie, NY
Jan 3, 2011; 7:00 pm		at Loyola (MD)	L 67–83	3–11 (2–1)	Reitz Arena (408); Baltimore, MD
Jan 5, 2011*; 7:00 pm		Princeton	L 57–68	3–12	Jadwin Gymnasium (1,539); Princeton, NJ
Jan 7, 2011; 7:30 pm		Fairfield	L 44–59	3–13 (2–2)	McCann Center (1,629); Poughkeepsie, NY
Jan 9, 2011; 2:00 pm		at Manhattan	W 65–59	4–13 (3–2)	Draddy Gymnasium (759); Riverdale, NY
Jan 14, 2011; 7:30 pm		Siena	L 59–66	4–14 (3–3)	McCann Center (2,074); Poughkeepsie, NY
Jan 16, 2011; 2:00 pm		at Iona	L 41–79	4–15 (3–4)	Hynes Athletics Center (1,624); New Rochelle, NY
Jan 20, 2011; 7:00 pm		at Rider	L 66–80	4–16 (3–5)	Alumni Gymnasium (1,420); Lawrenceville, NJ
Jan 22, 2011; 2:00 pm		Loyola (Md)	L 69–75	4–17 (3–6)	McCann Center (2,257); Poughkeepsie, NY
Jan 27, 2011; 7:00 pm		at Saint Peter's	L 53–85	4–18 (3–7)	Yanitelli Center (523); Jersey City, NJ
Jan 30, 2011; 12:00 pm		Manhattan	L 59–60	4–19 (3–8)	McCann Center (2,242); Poughkeepsie, NY
Feb 4, 2011; 7:00 pm		at Canisius	L 60–75	4–20 (3–9)	Koessler Athletic Center (950); Buffalo, NY
Feb 6, 2011; 7:00 pm		at Niagara	L 60–77	4–21 (3–10)	Gallagher Center (1,187); Lewiston, NY
Feb 11, 2011; 7:30 pm		Saint Peter's	L 54–66	4–22 (3–11)	McCann Center (1,545); Poughkeepsie, NY
Feb 13, 2011; 4:00 pm		Iona	L 70–85	4–23 (3–12)	McCann Center (1,690); Poughkeepsie, NY
Feb 16, 2011; 7:30 pm		at Fairfield	L 54–61	4–24 (3–13)	Webster Bank Arena (1,596); Bridgeport, CT
Feb 19, 2011*; 7:30 pm		New Hampshire; ESPN BracketBusters	W 59–48	5–24	McCann Center (1,563); Poughkeepsie, NY
Feb 25, 2011; 7:30 pm		Rider	L 64–80	5–25 (3–14)	McCann Center (1,639); Poughkeepsie, NY
Feb 27, 2011; 7:00 pm		at Siena	L 73–81	5–26 (3–15)	Times Union Center (7,456); Albany, NY
MAAC tournament
Mar 4, 2011; 7:30 pm	(9)	vs. (8) Niagara; MAAC First Round	W 73–61	6–26	Webster Bank Arena; Bridgeport, CT
Mar 5, 2011; 4:30 pm	(9)	at (1) Fairfield; MAAC Quarterfinals	L 31–55	6–27	Webster Bank Arena (5,235); Bridgeport, CT
*Non-conference game. ^{#}Rankings from AP Poll. (#) Tournament seedings in parentheses. All times are in Eastern Time Source.
