= Ed Cooley =

American basketball coach (born 1969)

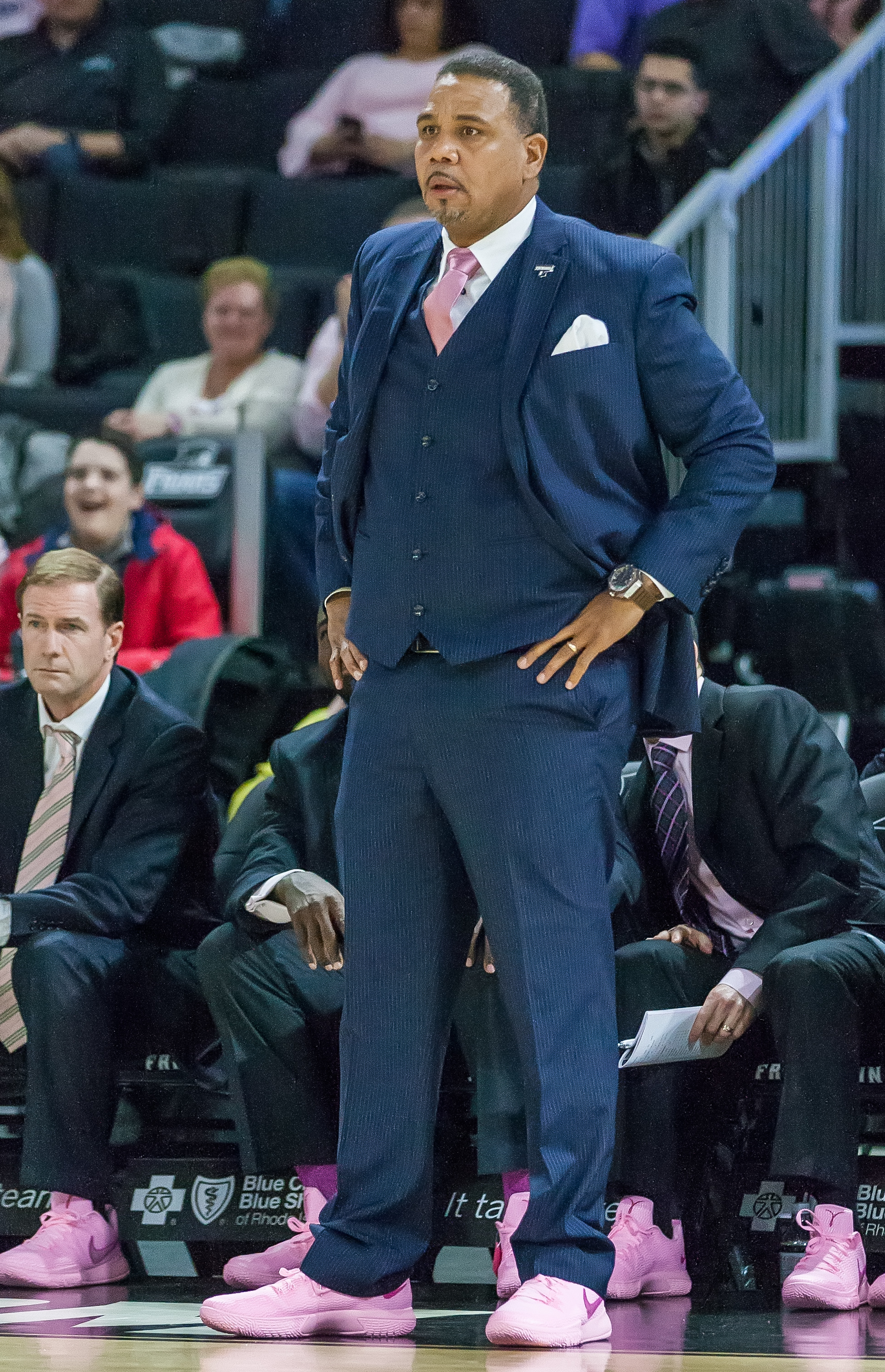
- Cooley in 2018

Current position
- Title: Head coach
- Team: Georgetown
- Conference: Big East
- Record: 48–57 (.457)

Biographical details
- Born: September 10, 1969 (age 57); Providence, Rhode Island, U.S.
- Education: Stonehill College (1994)

Playing career
- 1989–1994: Stonehill

Coaching career (HC unless noted)
- 1994–1995: UMass–Dartmouth (assistant)
- 1995–1996: Stonehill (assistant)
- 1996–1997: Rhode Island (assistant)
- 1997–2006: Boston College (assistant)
- 2006–2011: Fairfield
- 2011–2023: Providence
- 2023–present: Georgetown

Head coaching record
- Overall: 382–278 (.579)
- Tournaments: 3–7 (NCAA Division I); 3–3 (NIT); 1–1 (CBC); 4–5 (MAAC); 11–13 (Big East)

Accomplishments and honors

Championships
- MAAC Regular Season (2011); Big East Tournament (2014); Big East Regular Season (2022)

Awards
- Ben Jobe Award (2010); MAAC Coach of the Year (2011); Big East Coach of the Year (2022); Naismith College Coach of the Year (2022)

Edward Anthony Cooley (born September 10, 1969) is an American college basketball coach and currently the head coach of the Georgetown Hoyas men's basketball program. Cooley held the same position at Providence College from 2011 to 2023, and Fairfield University from 2006 to 2011. In 2022, he received national honors as the Naismith College Coach of the Year. Additionally, he received the inaugural 2010 Ben Jobe National Coach of the Year Award.

== Early years ==
Cooley was born on September 10, 1969, in Providence, Rhode Island, to Jane Cooley and Edward Smith. He was one of nine children by his mother in a family on welfare, living in the low-income South Providence neighborhood. However, he would later be taken in by neighbors Gloria and Eddie Searight, who provided Cooley with meals and a place to sleep.

At Providence's Central High School, Cooley played basketball and twice earned Rhode Island Player of the Year honors. After graduating in 1988, Cooley attended the New Hampton School in New Hampton, New Hampshire, for a post-graduate year in 1988–1989.

Cooley was a three-year team captain at Stonehill College, and was named to the Northeast-10 Conference academic honor roll. He earned a Bachelor of Science degree in history from Stonehill in 1994.

== Coaching career ==
Following college, Cooley taught history at Bridgewater-Raynham Regional High School in Massachusetts from 1994 to 1996. Meanwhile, Cooley began his coaching career at the University of Massachusetts Dartmouth, spending the 1994–1995 season as an assistant men's basketball coach before returning to Stonehill as an assistant coach in 1995–1996.

In 1996, Cooley joined Al Skinner's staff as an assistant coach for URI, before following Skinner to Boston College in 1997. In nine seasons as an assistant at BC, Cooley helped the Eagles post a 175–108 overall record, which included five 20-win seasons. The team captured the 2000–01 Big East Conference championship, five NCAA tournament berths, and one National Invitation Tournament, giving the team six post-season berths in nine seasons.

=== Fairfield (2006–2011) ===
Cooley earned his first head coaching position in 2006 for Fairfield University of the Metro Atlantic Athletic Conference. In five seasons, Cooley's teams posted a 92–69 overall record and 58–32 conference record. In 2009–10, with a 23–11 record, Fairfield advanced to postseason play, setting an NCAA Division I postseason record by overcoming a 27-point halftime deficit to win in overtime over George Mason in the 2010 CollegeInsider.com Tournament. The Stags were defeated in the quarterfinals of the tournament by Creighton. In 2010–11, Cooley's Fairfield squad captured the MAAC regular season championship before falling in the semifinals of the 2011 MAAC men's basketball tournament. They were defeated by Kent State in the second round of the 2011 NIT, finishing with a school-record 25–8 record. Cooley was named MAAC Men's Basketball Coach of the Year and was the USBWA District 1 Coach of the Year.

=== Providence (2011–2023) ===
On March 22, 2011, Cooley returned to his hometown and the Big East, replacing Keno Davis as head coach at Providence College, becoming the 15th head coach in program history. Cooley began to reinvigorate the program by recruiting six consensus Top 100 recruits in his first three years.

==== 2011–12 season ====
In his first season at Providence, Cooley led the Friars to a 15–17 mark overall, posting an 11–3 mark (8–0 at home) in non-conference action and going 4–14 in the Big East. That season, point guard Vincent Council was named third-team All-Big East and forward LaDontae Henton earned Big East All-Rookie Team accolades.

==== 2012–13 season ====
In his second season, Cooley led the Friars to a 19–15 record overall and a 9–9 mark in league play. Included in the 9–9 Big East record in 2012–13 was a 7–2 mark over the last nine games of the conference season, marking the second best turnaround over second half of the season in Big East history. The Friars played the season with a short roster with transfers Carson Desrosiers and Tyler Harris having to sit out the year per NCAA transfer rules, five star Freshman shooting guard and Providence native Ricky Ledo sitting our per NCAA eligibility issues, and five star freshman point guard Kris Dunn sitting out the first semester with a shoulder injury. Friars freshman guard Josh Fortune was the only incoming player in the 2012–2013 season eligible to compete. Cooley guided the Friars to the NIT where the squad posted a 2–1 record, beating Charlotte and Robert Morris before losing in the quarterfinals to eventual NIT Champion Baylor. That season, combo guard Bryce Cotton was named first-team All-Big East and Kadeem Batts was recognized as a co-winner of the league's Most Improved Award and earned All-Big East Honorable Mention accolades. After spending one year at Providence without being able to play, Ricky Ledo declared for the 2013 NBA draft and was selected by the Minnesota Timberwolves, eventually being traded to the Dallas Mavericks.

==== 2013–14 season ====
In his third season at Providence and first season in the reconfigured Big East Conference, Cooley led the Friars to a 10–8 mark in the Big East Conference and finished tied for 3rd with Xavier and St. John's. Transfers Carson Desrosiers and sophomore forward Tyler Harris, were eligible to play their first season in black and white, having sat out the NCAA enforced one-year period. However, in addition to former point guard Vincent Council's graduation and Ricky Ledo entering the draft, Sophomore point guard Kris Dunn faced another shoulder injury and had to sit out almost the entire year as a medical redshirt, Cleveland State transfer sophomore guard Junior Lamomba had to sit out the NCAA enforced one-year period, and incoming Freshmen Brandon Austin and Rodney Bullock were suspended for the entire season due to an unspecified violation of team rules. The Friars finished the season at 23–12 mark overall, the most wins in a season since 1996–1997. Two players received regular season honors, Senior point guard Bryce Cotton was named first-team All-Big East and Senior forward Kadeem Batts earned second-team All-Big East accolades. Entering the Big East tournament, the Friars played as the fourth seed due to losing the tie-breaker with Xavier. They defeated St. John's in the quarterfinals, Seton Hall in the semifinals, and Creighton in the thrilling final at Madison Square Garden, claiming PC's second tournament title in Big East history. By winning the Big East tournament the team earned an automatic bid, removing any "bubble" fears. On their way to making history as the first tournament champion of the reconfigured league, Junior forward Ladonte Henton was named to the All-Tournament Team and Senior guard Bryce Cotton was named the tournaments Most Outstanding Player. On selection Sunday, the Friars were given the 11th seed in the 2014 NCAA tournament East Regional and faced North Carolina. The Friars lost 79–77, but in defeat, Bryce Cotton scored a career high 36 points, making him the fourth all-time leading scorer in Providence College basketball history. Despite the loss, the season marked yet another major step forward by Cooley's in rebuilding the PC basketball program.

==== 2014–15 season ====
In his fourth season at Providence, Cooley led the Friars to a 22–12 record and went 11–7 in the Big East while finishing in sole possession of fourth place in the conference. Cooley received a boost by a dynamic recruiting class which included 3 composite Top 100 recruits (Paschal Chukwu, Jalen Lindsey, and Ben Bentil), as well as the return of Kris Dunn from his redshirt year due to his shoulder injury the season prior. Despite losing sharpshooter Josh Fortune as a result of transfer to the University of Colorado, Cooley gained the eligibility of transfer guard Junior Lomomba, who was forced to sit out the season before due to NCAA regulations. After beginning the season 5–0 (including an exciting 75–74 victory over Notre Dame in the championship game of the Hall of Fame Tip Off Tournament at Mohegan Sun), Providence was ranked #25 in the coaches poll, their first ranking since the 2003–2004 season. They later debuted in the AP poll on February 23, and peaked as high as 23rd in the polls. The Friars run in the polls was aided greatly by co-Big East Player of the Year Kris Dunn, who averaged 15.6 ppg and 7.5 apg in his return season, while senior forward LaDontae Henton added 19.7 ppg. Both players were named to the 2014–2015 First Team All-Big East team. Once again, the Friars faced St. John's in the first round of the Big East tournament, winning comfortably, before setting up a matchup against #4 Villanova in the second round of the tournament. Despite being heavy underdogs, Providence fought valiantly, only to be called for a controversial foul with 3.1 seconds left which led to two Ryan Arcidiacono free throws to seal a Villanova 63–61 victory. Villanova would later go on to win the Big East tournament. As a result of its excellent season, Providence would be selected as a 6 seed in the 2015 NCAA tournament East Region and faced the 11 seeded University of Dayton. Controversy again ensued for Ed Cooley's Friars, as the site of the game would be played in Columbus, Ohio, just 80 miles from Dayton's campus. Despite having qualified for the game two days before and being undersized, Dayton controlled the pace of play, and PC struggled after star guard Kris Dunn picked up 2 fouls in the first 2:42 of the game. After Providence cut the lead to 44–41 with 6:43 left, Dayton would go on a 14–4 run over the next 5:08 and go on to win comfortably 66–53 to end the Friars season. After the season, with star forward LaDontae Henton already graduating from the program, the other starting forward for the Friars, Tyler Harris, decided to explore a graduate season at the University of Auburn, and the Friars also lost highly regarded freshman Paschal Chukwu to Syracuse as a late transfer, a decision that surprised and confused Coach Cooley. After flirting with the NBA draft, Kris Dunn decided to return to Providence despite being considered a potential lottery pick in many NBA Draft projections.

==== 2015–16 season ====
In his fifth season, Cooley led the Friars to a 24–11, 10–8 in Big East play to finish in a tie for fourth place. They defeated Butler in the quarterfinals of the Big East tournament to advance to the semifinals where they lost to Villanova. They received an at-large bid to the NCAA tournament as a No. 9 seed where they faced USC in an exciting First Round matchup and won on a Rodney Bullock layup with 1.5 seconds left to advance to the Second Round where they lost to North Carolina. After the season, guard Kris Dunn and forward Ben Bentil declared for the 2016 NBA draft, where they were selected 5th overall by the Minnesota Timberwolves and 51st overall by the Boston Celtics, respectively.

==== 2016–17 season ====
In his sixth season, Cooley led the Friars to an overall record of 20–13, and went 10–8 in Big East play to finish in a four-way tie for third place. As the No. 3 seed in the Big East tournament, they lost in the quarterfinals to Creighton. They received an at-large bid to the NCAA tournament as a No. 11 seed where they lost to USC in the First Four.

==== 2017–18 season ====
In his seventh season, Cooley led the Friars to an overall record of 21–14, and went 10–8 in Big East play to finish in a three-way tie for third place. As the No. 5 seed in the Big East tournament, they defeated Creighton and No. 1-seeded Xavier in back-to-back overtime games to advance to the championship game. In a third straight overtime game, the Friars fell to Villanova in the championship game. They received an at-large bid to the NCAA tournament as the No. 10 seed in the West region where they lost to Texas A&M in the First Round.

==== 2018–19 season ====
In his eighth season, Cooley led the Friars to an overall record of 18–16, and went 7–11 in Big East play to finish in a three-way tie for last place. As the No. 8 seed in the Big East tournament, they defeated Butler before losing to Villanova in the quarterfinals. They received an at-large bid to the NIT where they lost in the First Round to Arkansas.

==== 2019–20 season ====
In his ninth season, Cooley led the Friars to an overall record of 19–12, and went 12–6 in Big East play to finish in fourth place, with three teams tied at the top of the table. The 2020 Big East tournament was cancelled at halftime of the first game of the quarterfinals due to the COVID-19 pandemic. At the time of the cancellation of the NCAA tournament, the Friars were listed as a projected member of the tournament field by every major college basketball publication.

==== 2020–21 season ====
In his tenth season, Cooley led the Friars to a 13–13 record, with a 9–10 mark in Big East play. Due to the Dunkin’ Donuts Center becoming a state-sanctioned testing site for COVID-19, Providence played its home games with no spectators at the on-campus Mullaney Gymnasium at Alumni Hall. This would mark the first time the Friars would play all home games on campus since 1972. Providence, a 6-seed in the 2021 Big East tournament, fell to 11-seed DePaul in front of no spectators at Madison Square Garden.

==== 2021–22 season ====
Despite standout guard David Duke Jr. declaring for the 2021 NBA draft, Cooley's eleventh season at the helm of the Providence Friars was one of their most historic seasons to date. The Friars finished with a 27–6 overall record. The Friars were ranked for 11 consecutive weeks to finish the season, having entered the AP Top 25 on December 20. Their 14–3 record against Big East opponents marked the most in-conference wins in program history, and their 16–1 record in home games at the Dunkin' Donuts Center was the program's best home record since the 1973–74 season. In their win over Creighton on February 26, Providence won its first-ever Big East regular season title. Cooley led the Friars to the program's sixth Sweet 16 appearance, where they dropped a 66–61 game to Kansas, the eventual national champion. Providence made its first appearance as a 4-seed in the NCAA Tournament, which was their highest-ever. For Providence's success, Cooley was tabbed as the winner of the 2021–22 Naismith Coach of the Year Award.

==== 2022–23 season ====
In his twelfth and final season with Providence, Cooley was tasked with replacing major role players from the year prior. Forwards Nate Watson, Justin Minaya & Noah Horchler - as well as guard Al Durham - graduated, and sharpshooter AJ Reeves declared for the NBA Draft. Cooley recruited Kentucky transfer Bryce Hopkins, South Carolina transfer Devin Carter, and Louisville graduate transfer Noah Locke - all of whom made immediate impacts. Cooley led the Friars to an overall record of 21–12, and went 13–7 in Big East play to finish in fifth place. Providence was eliminated by the UConn Huskies in the first round of the Big East tournament, and was awarded an at-large bid as an eleven-seed in the 2023 NCAA Tournament. The Friars were eliminated by #6 Kentucky in the first round.

On March 20, 2023, Cooley accepted an offer to become the new head coach of the Georgetown Hoyas men's basketball team. Cooley's decision to leave Providence prompted intense backlash from students and fans that was described in a lawsuit by a former employee of the school's athletic department as "racially charged, abusive and intrusive."

=== Georgetown (2023–Present) ===
Cooley's hiring at Georgetown was described by the press as a "tectonic" move within the Big East, praised as a "coup" for Georgetown that was likely to strengthen the historic but struggling program.

==== 2023–24 season ====
The 2023–2024 Hoyas started the season 7–4, with a notable last second win at Notre Dame, its first victory over the Irish on the road since the 2013 season (when they were a fellow member of the Big East). The team lost several close games in conference play, including its much anticipated matchup against Cooley's former team, Providence, one of the most watched college basketball games of the season. Ultimately, Georgetown finished second to last at 2–18 in the league and 9–23 overall. The two league wins however matched the number of wins the Hoyas had the prior two seasons combined in Big East play. Georgetown did not play in any Postseason.

==== 2024–25 season ====
The 2024–2025 season began with a completely overhauled roster, headlined by Top 50 high school recruit Thomas Sorber and highly regarded transfers Malik Mack (from Harvard) and Micah Peavy (from TCU). The Hoyas got out to their best start in over a decade, as they began the year 12–2. The strong start included Cooley's first win at rival Syracuse in the 100th matchup of the storied rivalry, and a 3–0 record to begin Big East play with wins over Creighton, Seton Hall and Xavier. Georgetown struggled with injuries down the stretch, most significantly losing Sorber for the season in early February. The team was selected to play in the inaugural 2025 College Basketball Crown postseason tournament in Las Vegas, Nevada. The Hoyas won their opening round game against Washington State, 85-82 before losing in the Quarterfinal to Nebraska 69-81.

==== 2025–26 season ====
After defeating No. 9 Kentucky in an October exhibition game, the Hoyas began the 2025–26 season with an 8–4 record that included wins against Maryland and Clemson. The early season was marred by an incident in which Cooley was suspended for one game in December after he threw a water bottle into the stands following a loss against Xavier. Two long losing streaks during Big East play left the Hoyas with a final conference record of 6–14, tied for 10th place and seeded 11th and last in the 2026 Big East Tournament. Although the team's final record of 16–18 was a disappointment, the season ended on a positive note, with Georgetown scoring two upset wins in the tournament and advancing beyond the first round for the first time since 2021 before losing to the second seed, No. 6 UConn, in the Hoyas' first semifinal appearance since 2021.

== Head coaching record ==
Record table
Season	Team	Overall	Conference	Standing	Postseason
Fairfield Stags (Metro Atlantic Athletic Conference) (2006–2011)
2006–07	Fairfield	13–19	10–8	T–5th	
2007–08	Fairfield	14–16	11–7	T–5th	
2008–09	Fairfield	17–15	9–9	T–4th	
2009–10	Fairfield	23–11	13–5	2nd	CIT Second Round
2010–11	Fairfield	25–8	15–3	1st	NIT Second Round
Fairfield:		92–69 (.571)	58–32 (.644)		
Providence Friars (Big East Conference) (2011–2023)
2011–12	Providence	15–17	4–14	15th	
2012–13	Providence	19–15	9–9	T–9th	NIT Quarterfinal
2013–14	Providence	23–12	10–8	T–3rd	NCAA Division I Round of 64
2014–15	Providence	22–12	11–7	4th	NCAA Division I Round of 64
2015–16	Providence	24–11	10–8	T–4th	NCAA Division I Round of 32
2016–17	Providence	20–13	10–8	T–3rd	NCAA Division I First Four
2017–18	Providence	21–14	10–8	T–3rd	NCAA Division I Round of 64
2018–19	Providence	18–16	7–11	T–8th	NIT First Round
2019–20	Providence	19–12	12–6	4th	
2020–21	Providence	13–13	9–10	6th	
2021–22	Providence	27–6	14–3	1st	NCAA Division I Sweet 16
2022–23	Providence	21–12	13–7	T–4th	NCAA Division I Round of 64
Providence:		242–153 (.613)	119–99 (.546)		
Georgetown Hoyas (Big East Conference) (2023–present)
2023–24	Georgetown	9–23	2–18	10th	
2024–25	Georgetown	18–16	8–12	7th	CBC Quarterfinals
2025–26	Georgetown	15–18*	6–14	T–10th	
2026–27	Georgetown	6–0	0–0		
Georgetown:		48–57 (.457)	16–44 (.267)		
Total:		382–278 (.579)			
National champion Postseason invitational champion Conference regular season champion Conference regular season and conference tournament champion Division regular season champion Division regular season and conference tournament champion Conference tournament champion

*Cooley was suspended for Georgetown's December 22, 2025, game against Coppin State. Jeff Battle coached the team and was credited with the win. Georgetown finished the season with an overall record of 16–18.

== Personal life ==
Cooley is married to Nurys Cooley. They have two children: Olivia and Isaiah.

Cooley is Catholic, and was known to attend church with Dan Hurley when the latter was coach of the Rhode Island Rams.
