= 2010–11 Saint Peter's Peacocks men's basketball team =

American college basketball season

2010–11 Saint Peter's Peacocks men's basketball
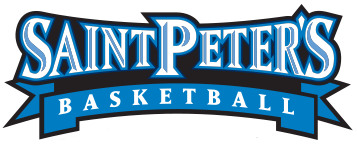

MAAC tournament champions

NCAA tournament, Round of 64
- Conference: Metro Atlantic Athletic Conference
- Record: 20–14 (11–7 MAAC)
- Head coach: John Dunne
- Assistant coaches: Dalip Bhatia; Marlon Guild; Bruce Hamburger
- Home arena: Yanitelli Center

2010–11 MAAC men's basketball standings
	Conf.				Overall
Team	W		L	PCT	W		L	PCT
Fairfield	15	–	3	.833	25	–	8	.758
Iona	13	–	5	.722	25	–	12	.676
Rider	13	–	5	.722	23	–	11	.676
Saint Peter's †	11	–	7	.611	20	–	14	.588
Loyola (MD)	10	–	8	.556	15	–	15	.500
Canisius	9	–	9	.500	15	–	15	.500
Siena	8	–	10	.444	13	–	18	.419
Niagara	5	–	13	.278	9	–	23	.281
Marist	3	–	15	.167	6	–	27	.182
Manhattan	3	–	15	.167	6	–	25	.194
† 2011 MAAC tournament winner Rankings from AP Poll

The 2010–11 Saint Peter's Peacocks men's basketball team represented Saint Peter's College during the 2010–11 NCAA Division I men's basketball season. The Peacocks, led by fifth year head coach John Dunne, played their home games at the Yanitelli Center and were members of the Metro Atlantic Athletic Conference. They finished the season 20–14, 11–7 in MAAC play to finish in fourth place. They defeated Loyola (MD), Fairfield, and Iona to win the MAAC tournament. As a result, they received the conference's automatic bid to the NCAA tournament as the No. 14 seed in the Southwest region where they lost to Purdue in the second round (formerly and now known as the First Round).

== Previous season ==
The Peacocks finished the 2009–10 season 16–14, 11–7 in MAAC play to finish in fourth place. They lost in the quarterfinals of the MAAC tournament to Rider.

== Roster ==
Number	Name	Position	Height	Weight	Year	Hometown
2	Yvon Raymond	Guard	6–3	180	Sophomore	Maplewood, New Jersey
4	Ryan Bacon	Forward	6–7	205	Senior	Maplewood, New Jersey
5	Jeron Belin	Forward	6–6	195	Senior	Meriden, Connecticut
10	Brandon Hall	Guard	6–1	185	Junior	Colonia, New Jersey
11	Blaise Ffrench	Guard	6–2	185	Sophomore	Springfield Gardens, New York
12	Chris Prescott	Guard	6–2	190	Junior	Bloomfield, Connecticut
13	Steven Samuels	Guard	6–4	170	Sophomore	Windsor, Connecticut
15	Wesley Jenkins	Guard	6–2	195	Senior	Newark, New Jersey
20	Chris Burke	Guard	6–4	185	Freshman	Willingboro, New Jersey
21	Kelsey Grant	Guard	6–1	190	Sophomore	Elizabeth, New Jersey
22	Nick Leon	Guard	5–11	170	Senior	Brooklyn, New York
24	Jordan Costner	Guard	6–6	210	Senior	Montclair, New Jersey
42	Darius Conley	Forward	6–7	235	Sophomore	Newport News, Virginia
45	Jack Hill	Forward	6–8	210	Junior	Houston, Texas

== Schedule and results ==
Date time, TV	Rank^{#}	Opponent^{#}	Result	Record	Site (attendance) city, state
Regular season
11/13/10*; 4:00 pm		at Robert Morris	L 30–55	0–1	Charles L. Sewall Center (1,078); Moon Township, PA
11/19/10*; 1:00 pm		vs. Old Dominion; Paradise Jam first round	L 52–59	0–2	Sports and Fitness Center; Saint Thomas, VI
11/20/10*; 3:30 pm		vs. Long Beach State; Paradise Jam consolation round	L 56–68	0–3	Sports and Fitness Center; Saint Thomas, VI
11/22/10*; 1:00 pm		vs. Alabama; Paradise Jam 7th place game	W 50–49	1–3	Sports and Fitness Center; Saint Thomas, VI
11/27/10*; 2:00 pm		Long Island	W 65–62	2–3	Yanitelli Center (648); Jersey City, NJ
11/29/10*; 7:00 pm		at Seton Hall	L 49–69	2–4	Prudential Center (6,131); Newark, NJ
12/2/10; 7:00 pm		at Loyola (MD)	W 55–52	3–4 (1–0)	Reitz Arena (857); Baltimore, MD
12/4/10; 2:00 pm		Manhattan	W 66–49	4–4 (2–0)	Yanitelli Center (687); Jersey City, NJ
12/11/10*; 7:00 pm		at Wagner	W 51–50	5–4	Spiro Sports Center (1,752); Staten Island, NY
12/18/10*; 2:00 pm		Fairleigh Dickinson	W 60–57	6–4	Yanitelli Center (509); Jersey City, NJ
12/21/10*; 7:00 pm		at Binghamton	W 61–56	7–4	Binghamton University Events Center (4,066); Vestal, NY
12/23/10*; 7:00 pm		at Rutgers	L 52–55	7–5	Louis Brown Athletic Center (4,999); Piscataway, NJ
12/29/10*; 2:30 pm		at Lehigh	L 64–77	7–6	Stabler Arena (652); Bethlehem, PA
1/3/11; 7:00 pm		Canisius	W 63–55	8–6 (3–0)	Yanitelli Center (456); Jersey City, NJ
1/7/11; 7:30 pm		at Iona	L 52–70	8–7 (3–1)	Hynes Athletic Center (1,359); New Rochelle, NY
1/9/11; 1:00 pm		at Fairfield	L 43–70	8–8 (3–2)	Webster Bank Arena (2,883); Bridgeport, CT
1/15/11; 2:00 pm		at Niagara	W 77–57	9–8 (4–2)	Yanitelli Center (567); Jersey City, NJ
1/17/11; 2:00 pm		Loyola (MD)	L 63–65	9–9 (4–3)	Yanitelli Center (623); Jersey City, NJ
1/21/11; 9:00 pm, ESPNU		Siena	W 77–69	10–9 (5–3)	Yanitelli Center (1,536); Jersey City, NJ
1/23/11; 12:00 pm, MAACTV		at Manhattan	W 62–53	11–9 (6–3)	Draddy Gymnasium (765); Riverdale, NY
1/27/11; 7:00 pm		Marist	W 85–53	12–9 (7–3)	Yanitelli Center (523); Jersey City, NJ
1/29/11; 2:00 pm		Rider	W 80–60	13–9 (8–3)	Yanitelli Center (947); Jersey City, NJ
2/4/11; 7:00 pm		at Niagara	W 70–47	14–9 (9–3)	Gallagher Center (1,422); Lewiston, NY
2/6/11; 2:00 pm		at Canisius	L 45–59	14–10 (9–4)	Koessler Athletic Center (847); Buffalo, NY
2/11/11; 7:30 pm		at Marist	W 66–54	15–10 (10–4)	McCann Field House (1,545); Poughkeepsie, NY
2/13/11; 2:00 pm		Fairfield	L 69–70 ^{OT}	15–11 (10–5)	Yanitelli Center (1,967); Jersey City, NJ
2/16/11; 7:00 pm		at Siena	W 67–57	16–11 (11–5)	Times Union Center (7,204); Albany, NY
2/19/11*; 3:00 pm		at Loyola Chicago; ESPN BracketBusters	W 71–67	17–11	Joseph J. Gentile Center (1,911); Chicago, IL
2/25/11; 9:00 pm		Iona	L 59–73	17–12 (11–6)	Yanitelli Center (1,287); Jersey City, NJ
2/27/11; 2:00 pm, MAACTV		at Rider	L 72–75	17–13 (11–7)	Alumni Gymnasium (1,650); Lawrenceville, NJ
MAAC tournament
3/5/11; 2:30 pm, MSG Plus	(4)	vs. (5) Loyola (MD); MAAC Quarterfinals	W 70–60	18–13	Webster Bank Arena (5,235); Bridgeport, CT
3/6/11; 2:00 pm, ESPNU	(4)	at (1) Fairfield; MAAC Semifinals	W 62–48	19–13	Webster Bank Arena (9,000); Bridgeport, CT
3/7/11; 7:00 pm, ESPN2	(4)	vs. (2) Iona; MAAC Championship Game	W 62–57	20–13	Webster Bank Arena (3,031); Bridgeport, CT
NCAA tournament
3/18/11*; 7:20 pm, TNT	(14 SW)	vs. (3 SW) No. 13 Purdue; NCAA Second Round	L 43–65	20–14	United Center (17,369); Chicago, IL
*Non-conference game. ^{#}Rankings from AP Poll. (#) Tournament seedings in parentheses. SW=NCAA Southwest Regional. All times are in Eastern Time.
