= 2010–11 Rider Broncs men's basketball team =

American college basketball season

2010–11 Rider Broncs men's basketball
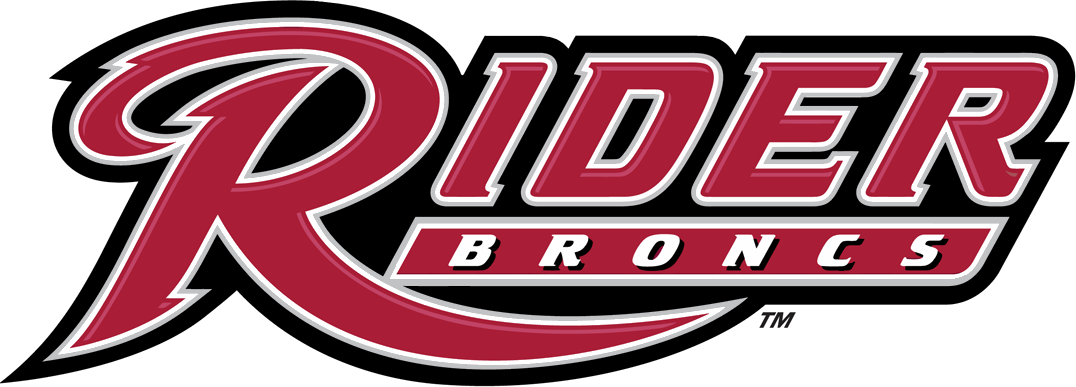

CIT, First Round
- Conference: Metro Atlantic Athletic Conference
- Record: 23–11 (13–5 MAAC)
- Head coach: Tommy Dempsey (6th season)
- Associate head coach: Kevin Baggett (3rd season)
- Assistant coaches: Mike Witcoskie (5th season); Ben Luber (1st season)
- Home arena: Alumni Gymnasium

2010–11 MAAC men's basketball standings
	Conf.				Overall
Team	W		L	PCT	W		L	PCT
Fairfield	15	–	3	.833	25	–	8	.758
Iona	13	–	5	.722	25	–	12	.676
Rider	13	–	5	.722	23	–	11	.676
Saint Peter's †	11	–	7	.611	20	–	14	.588
Loyola (MD)	10	–	8	.556	15	–	15	.500
Canisius	9	–	9	.500	15	–	15	.500
Siena	8	–	10	.444	13	–	18	.419
Niagara	5	–	13	.278	9	–	23	.281
Marist	3	–	15	.167	6	–	27	.182
Manhattan	3	–	15	.167	6	–	25	.194
† 2011 MAAC tournament winner Rankings from AP Poll

The 2010–11 Rider Broncs men's basketball team represented Rider University in the 2010–11 NCAA Division I men's basketball season. The Broncs, led by head coach Tommy Dempsey, played their home games at the Alumni Gymnasium in Lawrenceville, New Jersey, as members of the Metro Atlantic Athletic Conference. The Broncs finished in a tie for 2nd in the MAAC during the regular season, earning the 3rd seed in the MAAC tournament. Rider advanced to the semifinals of the MAAC tournament, where they were eliminated by Iona.

Rider failed to qualify for the NCAA tournament, but were invited to the 2011 CIT. The Broncs were eliminated in the first round of the CIT, losing to Northern Iowa, 84–50.

== Roster ==
2010–11 Rider Broncs men's basketball team
Players
Coaches

Pos.	#	Name	Height	Weight	Year	Hometown
F	2	Mike Ringgold	6 ft 7 in (2.01 m)	215 lb (98 kg)	Sr	Philadelphia, Pennsylvania
G	3	Jhamar Youngblood	6 ft 1 in (1.85 m)	210 lb (95 kg)	Sr	Elizabeth, New Jersey
G	10	Anthony Myles	6 ft 5 in (1.96 m)	200 lb (91 kg)	Fr	Dover, Delaware
G	12	Jonathan Thompson	6 ft 4 in (1.93 m)	190 lb (86 kg)	So	Orlando, Florida
F	13	Danny Stewart	6 ft 7 in (2.01 m)	210 lb (95 kg)	Fr	Philadelphia, Pennsylvania
G	14	Patrick Mansell	6 ft 1 in (1.85 m)	195 lb (88 kg)	GS	Laverock, Pennsylvania
G	15	Justin Robinson	6 ft 2 in (1.88 m)	190 lb (86 kg)	Sr	London, England
C	21	Dera Nd-Ezuma	6 ft 10 in (2.08 m)	215 lb (98 kg)	So	Nigeria
G	22	Jeff Jones	6 ft 4 in (1.93 m)	190 lb (86 kg)	Sr	Chester, Pennsylvania
G/F	23	Novar Gadson	6 ft 7 in (2.01 m)	230 lb (104 kg)	Jr	Philadelphia, Pennsylvania
F	31	Brandon Penn	6 ft 8 in (2.03 m)	205 lb (93 kg)	Jr	Philadelphia, Pennsylvania
G	32	Tom Pereira	6 ft 2 in (1.88 m)	190 lb (86 kg)	Fr	Nottinghamshire, England

Head coach

- Tommy Dempsey (Susquehanna)

Assistant coach(es)

- Kevin Baggett (Saint Joseph's)
- Mike Witcoskie (Susquehanna)
- Ben Luber (Penn State)

Legend

- (C) Team captain
- (S) Suspended
- (I) Ineligible
- (W) Walk-on
- Injured
- Current redshirt

Roster
Last update: January 23, 2023

== Schedule and results ==
Date time, TV	Rank^{#}	Opponent^{#}	Result	Record	Site (attendance) city, state
Exhibition
November 6, 2010*; 4:00 pm		TCNJ	W 80–42	—	Alumni Gymnasium; Lawrenceville, NJ
Regular season
November 12, 2010*; 7:30 pm		at UMass; Hall of Fame Tip-Off	L 67–77	0–1	Mullins Center (3,784); Lawrenceville, NJ
November 14, 2010*; 4:00 pm		Lafayette	W 80–73	1–1	Alumni Gymnasium (1,614); Lawrenceville, NJ
November 17, 2010*; 10:30 pm		at USC; Hall of Fame Tip-Off	W 77–57	2–1	Galen Center (3,187); Los Angeles, CA
November 20, 2010*; 2:30 pm		vs. TCU; Hall of Fame Tip-Off	W 76–61	3–1	MassMutual Center (2,274); Springfield, MA
November 21, 2010*; 12:00 pm		vs. Loyola Marymount; Hall of Fame Tip-Off	W 73–63	4–1	MassMutual Center (1,066); Springfield, MA
November 26, 2010; 7:00 pm		Siena	L 60–73	4–2 (0–1)	Alumni Gymnasium (1,650); Lawrenceville, NJ
November 29, 2010*; 7:00 pm		Hofstra	L 48–58	4–3	Alumni Gymnasium (1,575); Lawrenceville, NJ
December 2, 2010; 7:00 pm		at Manhattan	W 88–59	5–3 (1–1)	Draddy Gymnasium (832); Riverdale, NY
December 4, 2010*; 2:00 pm		at No. 3 Pittsburgh	L 68–87	5–4	Petersen Events Center (8,719); Pittsburgh, PA
December 8, 2010*; 7:30 pm		UMBC	W 81–39	6–4	Alumni Gymnasium (1,608); Lawrenceville, NJ
December 11, 2010*; 4:00 pm		at Drexel	L 67–71 ^{OT}	6–5	Daskalakis Athletic Center (1,678); Philadelphia, PA
December 15, 2010*; 7:00 pm		Monmouth	W 74–54	7–5	Alumni Gymnasium (1,616); Lawrenceville, NJ
December 22, 2010*; 7:00 pm		at La Salle	W 77–68	8–5	Tom Gola Arena (1,491); Philadelphia, PA
December 28, 2010*; 7:00 pm		at Howard	W 78–64	9–5	Burr Gymnasium (629); Washington, D.C.
January 3, 2011; 7:00 pm		Manhattan	W 88–78	10–5 (2–1)	Alumni Gymnasium (1,492); Lawrenceville, NJ
January 7, 2011; 9:00 pm		at Niagara	W 82–65	11–5 (3–1)	Gallagher Center (1,275); Lewiston, NY
January 9, 2011; 2:00 pm		at Canisius	W 77–76	12–5 (4–1)	Koessler Athletic Center (919); Buffalo, NY
January 14, 2011; 7:00 pm		Iona	L 96–100 ^{OT}	12–6 (4–2)	Alumni Gymnasium (1,650); Lawrenceville, NJ
January 17, 2011; 7:00 pm		Fairfield	L 57–65	12–7 (4–3)	Alumni Gymnasium (1,517); Lawrenceville, NJ
January 20, 2011; 7:00 pm		Marist	W 80–66	13–7 (5–3)	Alumni Gymnasium (1,420); Lawrenceville, NJ
January 24, 2011; 7:00 pm		at Siena	W 68–60	14–7 (6–3)	Times Union Center (7,095); Albany, NY
January 27, 2011; 7:30 pm		at Iona	W 61–59	15–7 (7–3)	Hynes Athletic Center (2,148); New Rochelle, NY
January 29, 2011; 2:00 pm		at Saint Peter's	L 60–80	15–8 (7–4)	Yanitelli Center (947); Jersey City, NJ
February 4, 2011; 7:00 pm		Loyola (MD)	W 61–60	16–8 (8–4)	Alumni Gymnasium (1,650); Lawrenceville, NJ
February 6, 2011; 3:30 pm		at Fairfield	W 96–87	17–8 (9–4)	Webster Bank Arena at Harbor Yard (2,183); Bridgeport, CT
February 11, 2011; 7:00 pm		Canisius	L 65–67	17–9 (9–5)	Alumni Gymnasium (1,650); Lawrenceville, NJ
February 13, 2011; 2:00 pm		Niagara	W 61–50	18–9 (10–5)	Alumni Gymnasium (1,580); Lawrenceville, NJ
February 16, 2011; 7:00 pm		at Loyola (MD)	W 82–70	19–9 (11–5)	Reitz Arena (1,031); Baltimore, MD
February 19, 2011*; 4:00 pm		Delaware; ESPN BracketBusters	W 95–86	20–9	Alumni Gymnasium (1,616); Lawrenceville, NJ
February 25, 2011; 7:30 pm		at Marist	W 80–64	21–9 (12–5)	McCann Arena (1,639); Poughkeepsie, NY
February 27, 2011; 1:35 pm		Saint Peter's	W 75–72	22–9 (13–5)	Alumni Gymnasium (1,650); Lawrenceville, NJ
MAAC tournament
March 5, 2011; 10:00 pm	(3)	vs. (6) Canisius; MAAC Quarterfinals	W 79–64	23–9	Webster Bank Arena at Harbor Yard (2,577); Bridgeport, CT
March 6, 2011; 4:00 pm	(3)	vs. (2) Iona; MAAC Semifinals	L 59–83	23–10	Webster Bank Arena at Harbor Yard (3,956); Bridgeport, CT
CollegeInsider.com tournament
March 15, 2011; 8:00 pm		at Northern Iowa; CIT First Round	L 50–84	23–11	McLeod Center (3,318); Cedar Rapids, IA
*Non-conference game. ^{#}Rankings from AP Poll. (#) Tournament seedings in parentheses. All times are in Eastern Time.
