= 2010–11 Manhattan Jaspers basketball team =

American college basketball season

2010–11 Manhattan Jaspers basketball
- Conference: Metro Atlantic Athletic Conference
- Record: 6-25 (3-15 MAAC)
- Head coach: Barry Rohrssen (5th season)
- Home arena: Draddy Gymnasium

2010–11 MAAC men's basketball standings
	Conf.				Overall
Team	W		L	PCT	W		L	PCT
Fairfield	15	–	3	.833	25	–	8	.758
Iona	13	–	5	.722	25	–	12	.676
Rider	13	–	5	.722	23	–	11	.676
Saint Peter's †	11	–	7	.611	20	–	14	.588
Loyola (MD)	10	–	8	.556	15	–	15	.500
Canisius	9	–	9	.500	15	–	15	.500
Siena	8	–	10	.444	13	–	18	.419
Niagara	5	–	13	.278	9	–	23	.281
Marist	3	–	15	.167	6	–	27	.182
Manhattan	3	–	15	.167	6	–	25	.194
† 2011 MAAC tournament winner Rankings from AP Poll

The 2010–11 Manhattan Jaspers basketball team represented Manhattan College during the 2010–11 NCAA Division I men's basketball season. The Jaspers, led by fifth year head coach Barry Rohrssen, played their home games at Draddy Gymnasium as members of the Metro Atlantic Athletic Conference. They finished the season 6–25 overall and 3–15 in MAAC conference play. They lost in the first round of the MAAC Basketball tournament 68–66 in overtime to Siena. Rohrssen was fired on March 9, 2011, finishing his five-year tenure at Manhattan with a 58–95 record.

== Roster ==
2010–11 Manhattan Jaspers men's basketball team
#	Name	Position	Height	Weight	Year	Hometown
1	Robert Martina	Guard	6–8	215	Junior	Pompano Beach, Florida
5	Rhamel Brown	Forward	6–7	230	Freshman	Brooklyn, New York
11	Andrew Gabriel	Forward	6–6	230	Senior	Brooklyn, New York
15	Nick Walsh	Guard	5–10	150	Senior	Bronx, New York
20	Liam McCabe-Moran	Guard	6–4	190	Junior	New Rochelle, New York
21	Djibril Coulibaly	Center	6–9	200	Junior	Bamako, Mali
23	Demetrius Jemison	Forward	6–8	240	Senior	Birmingham, Alabama
24	George Beamon	Guard	6–4	175	Sophomore	Roslyn, New York
31	Michael Alvarado	Guard	6–2	180	Freshman	Bronx, New York
32	Mohamed Koita	Guard	6–4	195	Sophomore	Cergy, France
41	Kevin Laue	Center	6–11	230	Sophomore	Pleasanton, California
50	Kidani Brutus	Guard	6–1	220	Junior	Bronx, New York

== Schedule ==
Date time, TV	Rank^{#}	Opponent^{#}	Result	Record	Site (attendance) city, state
Regular season
November 13, 2010*; 2:00 pm		at NJIT	W 75–70	1–0	Fleisher Center (790); Newark, NJ
November 17, 2010*; 7:00 pm		Pennsylvania	W 59–54	2–0	Draddy Gymnasium (1,988); Riverdale, NY
November 20, 2010*; 2:00 pm		Long Island	L 80–91	2–1	Draddy Gymnasium (1,184); Riverdale, NY
November 25, 2010*; 2:20 pm, ESPN2		vs. Wisconsin; Old Spice Classic Quarterfinals	L 35–50	2–2	HP Field House (3,035); Orlando, FL
November 26, 2010*; 2:30 pm, ESPNU		vs. Texas A&M; Old Spice Classic second round	L 45–74	2–3	HP Field House (3,229); Orlando, FL
November 28, 2010*; 4:30 pm, ESPNU		vs. Georgia; Old Spice Classic seventh place game	L 58-61	2-4	HP Field House (3,428); Orlando, FL
December 2, 2010; 7:00 pm		Rider	L 59-88	2–5 (0-1)	Draddy Gymnasium (832); Riverdale, NY
December 4, 2010; 2:00 pm		at Saint Peter's	L 49-66	2–6 (0-2)	Yanitelli Center (687); Jersey City, NJ
December 8, 2010*; 7:00 pm		at Fordham	L 59-73	2-7	Rose Hill Gymnasium (1,996); Bronx, NY
December 11, 2010*; 2:00 pm		Binghamton	L 69-70	2-8	Draddy Gymnasium (2,034); Riverdale, NY
December 18, 2010*; 7:00 pm		Hofstra	L 58-71	2-9	Draddy Gymnasium (763); Riverdale, NY
December 22, 2010*; 7:00 pm		at Bowling Green	L 57-70	2-10	Anderson Arena (1,021); Bowling Green, OH
January 3, 2011; 7:00 pm		at Rider	L 78-88	2-11 (0-3)	Alumni Gymnasium (1,492); Lawrenceville, NJ
January 7, 2011; 7:00 pm		Loyola (MD)	L 67-82	2-12 (0-4)	Draddy Gymnasium (634); Riverdale, NY
January 9, 2011; 2:00 pm		Marist	L 59-65	2-13 (0-5)	Draddy Gymnasium (759); Riverdale, NY
January 11, 2011*; 7:00 pm		at Florida Atlantic	L 50-57	2-14	FAU Arena (1,064); Boca Raton, FL
January 15, 2011; 2:00 pm		Canisius	L 51-72	2-15 (0-6)	Draddy Gymnasium (1,034); Riverdale, NY
January 17, 2011; 2:00 pm		Niagara	W 51-49	3-15 (1-6)	Draddy Gymnasium (824); Riverdale, NY
January 20, 2011; 8:00 pm		at Loyola (MD)	L 50-62	3-16 (1-7)	Reitz Arena (1,022); Baltimore, MD
January 23, 2011; 12:00 pm, ESPN3		Saint Peter's	L 53-62	3-17 (1-8)	Draddy Gymnasium (765); Riverdale, NY
January 28, 2011; 7:30 pm		at Fairfield	L 59-61	3-18 (1-9)	Arena at Harbor Yard (3,276); Bridgeport, CT
January 30, 2011; 12:00 pm, ESPN3		at Marist	W 60-59	4-18 (2-9)	McCann Arena (2,242); Poughkeepsie, NY
February 4, 2011; 7:30 pm		at Siena	L 57-64	4-19 (2-10)	Times Union Center (8,064); Albany, NY
February 7, 2011; 7:30 pm, ESPN3		at Iona	L 67-85	4-20 (2-11)	Hynes Athletics Center (2,213); New Rochelle, NY
February 11, 2011; 7:00 pm		Fairfield	L 56-65	4-21 (2-12)	Draddy Gymnasium (1,634); Riverdale, NY
February 13, 2011; 2:00 pm		Siena	W 84-81	5-21 (3-12)	Draddy Gymnasium (1,982); Riverdale, NY
February 16, 2011; 7:00 pm		Iona	L 65-102	5-22 (3-13)	Draddy Gymnasium (1,798); Riverdale, NY
February 19, 2011*; 2:00 pm		at Stony Brook; ESPN BracketBusters	W 64-63 ^{OT}	6-22	Pritchard Gymnasium (1,630); Stony Brook, NY
February 25, 2011; 7:00 pm		at Canisius	L 63-72	6-23 (3-14)	Koessler Athletic Center (1,061); Buffalo, NY
February 27, 2011; 2:00 pm		at Niagara	L 59-66	6-24 (3-15)	Gallagher Center (1,662); Niagara Falls, NY
MAAC tournament
March 4, 2011; 9:30 pm		vs. Siena; First Round	L 66-68 ^{OT}	6-25	Arena at Harbor Yard (2,276); Bridgeport, CT
*Non-conference game. ^{#}Rankings from AP Poll. (#) Tournament seedings in parentheses. All times are in Eastern Time.

== Statistical leaders ==
Points
Rank	Player	Points
1	George Beamon	505
2	Kidani Brutus	295
3	Michael Alvarado	291

Rebounds
Rank	Player	Rebounds
1	Rhamel Brown	221
2	Demetrius Jemison	190
3	George Beamon	189

Assists
Rank	Player	Assists
1	Michael Alvarado	82
2	Kidani Brutus	57
3	George Beamon	41
