= 2010–11 Fairfield Stags men's basketball team =

American college basketball season

2010–11 Fairfield Stags men's basketball

MAAC Regular Season Champions

NIT, Second Round
- Conference: Metro Atlantic Athletic Conference
- Record: 25–8 (15–3 MAAC)
- Head coach: Ed Cooley
- Assistant coaches: Bob Simon; Brian Blaney; Carmen Maciariello
- Home arena: Webster Bank Arena

2010–11 MAAC men's basketball standings
	Conf.				Overall
Team	W		L	PCT	W		L	PCT
Fairfield	15	–	3	.833	25	–	8	.758
Iona	13	–	5	.722	25	–	12	.676
Rider	13	–	5	.722	23	–	11	.676
Saint Peter's †	11	–	7	.611	20	–	14	.588
Loyola (MD)	10	–	8	.556	15	–	15	.500
Canisius	9	–	9	.500	15	–	15	.500
Siena	8	–	10	.444	13	–	18	.419
Niagara	5	–	13	.278	9	–	23	.281
Marist	3	–	15	.167	6	–	27	.182
Manhattan	3	–	15	.167	6	–	25	.194
† 2011 MAAC tournament winner Rankings from AP Poll

The 2010–11 Fairfield Stags men's basketball team represented Fairfield University during the 2010–11 NCAA Division I men's basketball season. The Stags, led by 5th year head coach Ed Cooley, played their home games at Webster Bank Arena and are members of the Metro Atlantic Athletic Conference. The Stags finished the season 25–8, 15–3 in MAAC play and were MAAC regular season champions for the first time since 1986. They lost in the semifinals of the 2011 MAAC men's basketball tournament to Saint Peter's. As regular season champions who failed to win their conference tournament, they earned an automatic bid to the 2011 National Invitation Tournament where they defeated Colorado State in the first round before falling in the second round to Kent State.

== Roster ==
Number	Name	Position	Height	Weight	Year	Hometown
3	Derek Needham	Guard	5–11	180	Sophomore	Dolton, Illinois
4	Yorel Hawkins	Forward	6–5	207	Senior	Apex, North Carolina
9	Ernesto Stanley	Guard	5–9	165	Freshman	Brooklyn, New York
10	Desmond Wade	Guard	5–8	150	Junior	Linden, New Jersey
11	Lyndon Jordan	Guard	6–2	180	Senior	Winder, Georgia
12	Sean Crawford	Guard	5–10	150	Junior	Laurelton, New York
13	Gary Martin	Guard	6–2	180	Junior	Cleveland, Ohio
15	Maurice Barrow	Forward	6–5	210	Freshman	St. Albans, New York
21	Rakim Sanders	Guard/Forward	6–5	228	Senior	Pawtucket, Rhode Island
22	Warren Edney	Forward	6–5	204	Senior	Vienna, Virginia
23	Jamel Fields	Guard	6–1	175	Freshman	Albany, New York
25	Colin Nickerson	Guard	6–3	150	Sophomore	Waukegan, Illinois
34	Ryan Olander	Forward	7–0	220	Junior	Mansfield, Connecticut
40	Kristian Petric	Forward	6–6	205	Senior	Mahwah, New Jersey
41	Keith Matthews	Forward	6–5	200	Freshman	Sebastian, Florida
44	Greg Nero	Forward	6–7	215	Senior	Red Hook, New York

== Schedule ==
Date time, TV	Rank^{#}	Opponent^{#}	Result	Record	Site (attendance) city, state
Exhibition
11/1/10*; 7:30 pm		Bridgeport	W 78–54		Webster Bank Arena; Bridgeport, CT
11/8/10*; 7:30 pm		Stonehill	L 60–61		Webster Bank Arena; Bridgeport, CT
Regular season
11/13/10*; 4:00 pm		vs. Sacred Heart	W 62–45	1–0	Mohegan Sun Arena (3,829); Uncasville, CT
11/15/10*; 7:30 pm		at Rutgers	L 53–68	1–1	Louis Brown Athletic Center (3,810); Piscataway, NJ
11/19/10*; 7:30 pm		at Penn State	L 49–64	1–2	Bryce Jordan Center (4,177); University Park, PA
11/23/10*; 7:30 pm		Saint Joseph's	L 51–60	1–3	Webster Bank Arena (2,214); Bridgeport, CT
11/26/10*; 5:15 pm		vs. Norfolk State; Philly Hoop Group Classic	W 91–56	2–3	The Palestra (NA); Philadelphia, PA
12/2/10*; 7:00 pm		at Savannah State	W 41–39	3–3	Tiger Arena (688); Savannah, GA
12/5/10; 3:30 pm		Loyola (MD)	W 65–55	4–3 (1–0)	Webster Bank Arena (1,898); Bridgeport, CT
12/7/10*; 7:00 pm		Howard	W 72–52	5–3	Alumni Hall (1,898); Fairfield, CT
12/10/10; 7:00 pm		at Siena	W 72–55	6–3 (2–0)	Times Union Center (6,953); Albany, NY
12/12/10*; 4:00 pm		at Holy Cross	W 71–60	7–3	Hart Center (1,077); Worcester, MA
12/20/10*; 7:30 pm		Vermont	W 67–59	8–3	Webster Bank Arena (2,472); Bridgeport, CT
12/28/10*; 7:00 pm, ESPNU		at Florida	Cancelled; Fairfield could not travel due to heavy snow		O'Connell Center; Gainesville, FL
12/31/10*; 4:00 pm		Army	W 68–61	9–3	Alumni Hall (2,012); Fairfield, CT
1/3/11; 7:30 pm		Niagara	W 70–48	10–3 (3–0)	Webster Bank Arena (1,794); Bridgeport, CT
1/7/11; 7:30 pm		at Marist	W 59–44	11–3 (4–0)	McCann Field House (1,629); Poughkeepsie, NY
1/9/11; 1:00 pm		Saint Peter's	W 70–43	12–3 (5–0)	Webster Bank Arena (2,883); Bridgeport, CT
1/14/11; 7:00 pm, ESPNU		at Loyola (MD)	L 65–66	12–4 (5–1)	Reitz Arena (1,712); Baltimore, MD
1/17/11; 7:00 pm		at Rider	W 65–57	13–4 (6–1)	Alumni Gymnasium (1,517); Lawrenceville, NJ
1/21/11; 7:00 pm, MSG		at Canisius	W 67–60	14–4 (7–1)	Koessler Athletic Center (1,353); Buffalo, NY
1/23/11; 2:00 pm		at Niagara	W 57–49	15–4 (8–1)	Gallagher Center (1,327); Lewiston, NY
1/28/11; 7:30 pm		Manhattan	W 61–59	16–4 (9–1)	Webster Bank Arena (3,276); Bridgeport, CT
1/31/11; 7:00 pm, MSG		Canisius	W 70–55	17–4 (10–1)	Webster Bank Arena (1,608); Bridgeport, CT
2/4/11; 6:00 pm, ESPNU		Iona	W 89–56	18–4 (11–1)	Webster Bank Arena (4,094); Bridgeport, CT
2/6/11; 2:00 pm		Rider	W 82–64	18–5 (11–2)	Webster Bank Arena (2,183); Bridgeport, CT
2/11/11; 7:00 pm		at Manhattan	W 65–56	19–5 (12–2)	Draddy Gymnasium (1,634); Riverdale, NY
2/13/11; 2:00 pm		at Saint Peter's	W 70–69 ^{OT}	20–5 (13–2)	Yanitelli Center (1,967); Jersey City, NJ
2/16/11; 7:30 pm		Marist	W 61–54	21–5 (14–2)	Webster Bank Arena (1,596); Bridgeport, CT
2/19/11*; 1:00 pm, ESPNU		Austin Peay; ESPN BracketBusters	W 76–69	22–5	Webster Bank Arena (3,942); Bridgeport, CT
2/25/11; 7:00 pm, ESPN2		Siena	W 68–55	23–5 (15–2)	Webster Bank Arena (5,287); Bridgeport, CT
2/27/11; 3:30 pm		at Iona	L 69–74	23–6 (15–3)	Hynes Athletic Center (2,611); New Rochelle, NY
MAAC tournament
3/5/11; 4:30 pm	(1)	(9) Marist; Quarterfinals	W 55–31	24–6	Webster Bank Arena (5,235); Bridgeport, CT
3/6/11; 2:00 pm	(1)	(4) Saint Peter's; Semifinals	L 48–62	24–7	Webster Bank Arena (9,000); Bridgeport, CT
2011 NIT
3/15/11*; 9:00 pm, ESPN3	(6 C)	at (3 C) Colorado State; First Round	W 62–60	25–7	Moby Arena (3,202); Fort Collins, CO
3/20/11*; 12:30 pm, ESPNU	(6 C)	(7 C) Kent State; Second Round	L 68–72	25–8	Webster Bank Arena (3,954); Bridgeport, CT
*Non-conference game. ^{#}Rankings from AP Poll. (#) Tournament seedings in parentheses. C=NIT Colorado bracket. All times are in Eastern Time.
