= 2010–11 Iona Gaels men's basketball team =

American college basketball season

2010–11 Iona Gaels men's basketball
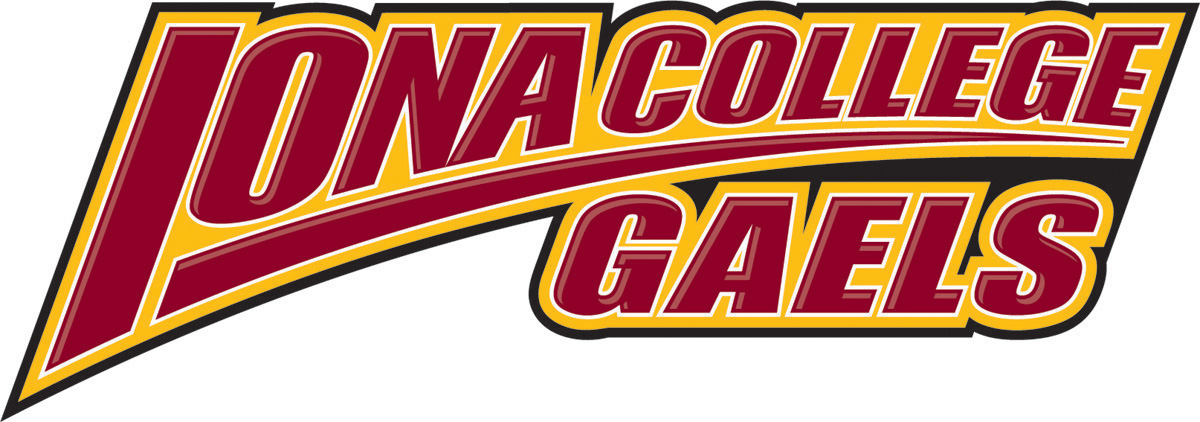

CIT tournament Runner-up
- Conference: Metro Atlantic Athletic Conference
- Record: 25–12 (13–5 MAAC)
- Head coach: Tim Cluess (1st season)
- Assistant coaches: Jared Grasso; Mark Calzonetti; Garee Bryant
- Home arena: Hynes Athletics Center

2010–11 MAAC men's basketball standings
| | Conf. | | | | Overall |
| Team | W | | L | PCT | W | | L | PCT |
|---|---|---|---|---|---|---|---|---|
| Fairfield | 15 | – | 3 | .833 | 25 | – | 8 | .758 |
| Iona | 13 | – | 5 | .722 | 25 | – | 12 | .676 |
| Rider | 13 | – | 5 | .722 | 23 | – | 11 | .676 |
| Saint Peter's † | 11 | – | 7 | .611 | 20 | – | 14 | .588 |
| Loyola (MD) | 10 | – | 8 | .556 | 15 | – | 15 | .500 |
| Canisius | 9 | – | 9 | .500 | 15 | – | 15 | .500 |
| Siena | 8 | – | 10 | .444 | 13 | – | 18 | .419 |
| Niagara | 5 | – | 13 | .278 | 9 | – | 23 | .281 |
| Marist | 3 | – | 15 | .167 | 6 | – | 27 | .182 |
| Manhattan | 3 | – | 15 | .167 | 6 | – | 25 | .194 |
† 2011 MAAC tournament winner Rankings from AP Poll

The 2010–11 Iona Gaels men's basketball team represented Iona College during the 2010–11 NCAA Division I men's basketball season. The Gaels, led by first year head coach Tim Cluess, played their home games at Hynes Athletics Center and are members of the Metro Atlantic Athletic Conference.

They finished the season 25–12, 13–5 in MAAC and lost in the championship game of the 2011 MAAC men's basketball tournament to Saint Peter's. They were invited to the 2011 CollegeInsider.com Tournament where they advanced to the championship game before falling to Santa Clara.

== Roster ==
| Number | Name | Position | Height | Weight | Year | Hometown |
|---|---|---|---|---|---|---|
| 1 | Mike Glover | Forward | 6–7 | 215 | Junior | Bronx, New York |
| 3 | Scott Machado | Guard | 6–1 | 180 | Junior | Queens, New York |
| 5 | Rashon Dwight | Guard | 6–3 | 185 | Senior | Newark, New Jersey |
| 10 | Jermel Jenkins | Guard | 5–11 | 185 | Junior | Union, New Jersey |
| 11 | Trinity Fields | Guard | 6–2 | 175 | Junior | Queens, New York |
| 21 | Alejo Rodriquez | Forward | 6–8 | 235 | Senior | New York City, New York |
| 22 | Sean Armand | Guard | 6–3 | 190 | Freshman | Brooklyn, New York |
| 23 | Randy Dezouvre | Guard/Forward | 6–5 | 210 | Junior | Montreal, Quebec, Canada |
| 24 | Aleksandar Kesic | Forward | 6–8 | 210 | Freshman | Belgrade, Serbia |
| 32 | Kristian Duravcevic | Forward | 6–8 | 215 | Freshman | Bronx, New York |
| 33 | Kyle Smyth | Guard | 6–4 | 185 | Sophomore | River Edge, New Jersey |
| 35 | Jayon James | Guard/Forward | 6–6 | 225 | Freshman | Paterson, New Jersey |
| 44 | Chris Pelcher | Forward/Center | 6–10 | 240 | Sophomore | Albany, New York |

== Schedule ==
| Date time, TV | Rank^{#} | Opponent^{#} | Result | Record | Site (attendance) city, state |
Regular season
| 11/12/10*; 5:00 pm | | vs. Kent State; World Vision Classic | L 72–73 | 0–1 | Wolstein Center (1,450); Cleveland, OH |
| 11/13/10*; 6:00 pm | | at Cleveland State; World Vision Classic | L 68–78 | 0–2 | Wolstein Center (1,561); Clevaland, OH |
| 11/14/10*; 3:30 pm | | vs. Bryant; World Vision Classic | L 72–74 | 0–3 | Wolstein Center (2,805); Clevaland, OH |
| 11/18/10*; 7:30 pm | | Richmond | W 81–77 ^{2OT} | 1–3 | Hynes Athletics Center (2,611); New Rochelle, NY |
| 11/23/10*; 7:30 pm | | at Albany | W 86–65 | 2–3 | SEFCU Arena (1,248); Albany, NY |
| 11/30/10*; 7:00 pm | | at Norfolk State | W 73–64 | 3–3 | Joseph G. Echols Memorial Hall (1,002); Norfolk, VA |
| 12/3/10; 7:30 pm | | Canisius | W 94–85 | 4–3 (1–0) | Hynes Athletics Center (2,527); New Rochelle, NY |
| 12/5/10; 2:00 pm | | Niagara | W 82–58 | 5–3 (2–0) | Hynes Athletics Center (1,711); New Rochelle, NY |
| 12/8/10*; 8:00 pm | | at Long Island | W 88–82 | 6–3 | Athletic, Recreation & Wellness Center (1,185); Brooklyn, NY |
| 12/11/10*; 2:00 pm | | Fairleigh Dickinson | W 87–56 | 7–3 | Hynes Athletics Center (1,843); New Rochelle, NY |
| 12/18/10*; 7:00 pm, SNY | | at Syracuse | L 77–83 | 7–4 | Carrier Dome (17,871); Syracuse, NY |
| 12/22/10*; 7:30 pm | | Vermont | L 79–84 | 7–5 | Hynes Athletics Center (2,611); New Rochelle, NY |
| 12/29/10*; 7:30 pm | | Hofstra | W 87–62 | 8–5 | Hynes Athletics Center (2,085); New Rochelle, NY |
| 1/3/11; 7:00 pm | | at Siena | L 67–73 | 8–6 (2–1) | Times Union Center (5,850); Albany, NY |
| 1/7/11; 7:30 pm | | Saint Peter's | W 70–52 | 9–6 (3–1) | Hynes Athletics Center (1,359); New Rochelle, NY |
| 1/9/11; 2:00 pm | | Loyola (MD) | W 86–68 | 10–6 (4–1) | Hynes Athletics Center (1,624); New Rochelle, NY |
| 1/14/11; 7:00 pm | | at Rider | W 100–96 ^{OT} | 11–6 (5–1) | Alumni Gymnasium (1,650); Lawrenceville, NJ |
| 1/16/11; 2:00 pm | | Marist | W 79–41 | 12–6 (6–1) | Hynes Athletics Center (1,624); New Rochelle, NY |
| 1/21/11; 7:00 pm | | at Niagara | W 72–66 | 13–6 (7–1) | Gallagher Center (1,651); Lewiston, NY |
| 1/23/11; 2:00 pm | | at Canisius | L 73–75 | 13–7 (7–2) | Koessler Athletic Center (1,075); Buffalo, NY |
| 1/27/11; 7:30 pm | | Rider | L 59–61 | 13–8 (7–3) | Hynes Athletics Center (2,148); New Rochelle, NY |
| 1/30/11; 12:00 pm | | at Loyola (MD) | L 85–88 ^{OT} | 13–9 (7–4) | Reitz Arena (719); Baltimore, MD |
| 2/4/11; 9:00 pm, ESPNU | | at Fairfield | L 71–75 | 13–10 (7–5) | Webster Bank Arena (4,094); Bridgeport, CT |
| 2/7/11; 7:30 pm, MSG | | Manhattan | W 85–67 | 14–10 (8–5) | Hynes Athletics Center (2,213); New Rochelle, NY |
| 2/11/11; 7:00 pm, ESPNU | | Siena | W 69–65 | 15–10 (9–5) | Hynes Athletics Center (2,611); New Rochelle, NY |
| 2/13/11; 4:00 pm | | at Marist | W 85–70 | 16–10 (10–5) | McCann Field House (1,690); Poughkeepsie, NY |
| 2/16/11; 7:00 pm | | at Manhattan | W 102–65 | 17–10 (11–5) | Draddy Gymnasium (1,798); Riverdale, NY |
| 2/19/11*; 3:00 pm, ESPNU | | at Liberty; ESPN BracketBusters | W 77–57 | 18–10 | Vines Center (4,931); Lynchburg, VA |
| 2/25/11; 9:00 pm, ESPNU | | at Saint Peter's | W 73–59 | 19–10 (12–5) | Yanitelli Center (1,287); Jersey City, NJ |
| 2/27/11; 3:30 pm | | Fairfield | W 74–69 | 20–10 (13–5) | Hynes Athletics Center (2,611); New Rochelle, NY |
MAAC tournament
| 3/5/11; 7:30 pm, MSG+ | (2) | vs. (7) Siena; MAAC Quarterfinals | W 94–64 | 21–10 | Webster Bank Arena (2,577); Bridgeport, CT |
| 3/6/11; 4:00 pm, MSG2 | (2) | vs. (3) Rider; MAAC Semifinals | W 83–59 | 22–10 | Webster Bank Arena (3,956); Bridgeport, CT |
| 3/7/11; 7:00 pm, ESPN2 | (2) | vs. (4) Saint Peter's; MAAC Championship Game | L 57–63 | 22–11 | Webster Bank Arena (3,956); Bridgeport, CT |
CollegeInsider.com tournament
| 3/16/11*; 8:00 pm, FCS Broadband | | at Valparaiso; CIT First Round | W 85–77 | 23–11 | Athletics–Recreation Center (1,482); Valparaiso, IN |
| 3/22/11*; 7:30 pm, FCS Broadband | | Buffalo; CIT Quarterfinals | W 78–63 | 24–11 | Hynes Athletics Center (1,638); New Rochelle, NY |
| 3/26/11*; 2:00 pm, FCS Broadband | | at East Tennessee State; CIT Semifinals | W 83–80 | 25–11 | MSHA Athletic Center (2,540); Johnson City, TN |
| 3/30/11*; 8:00 pm, FCS | | Santa Clara; Championship Game | L 69–76 | 25–12 | Hynes Athletics Center (2,202); New Rochelle, NY |
*Non-conference game. ^{#}Rankings from AP Poll. (#) Tournament seedings in parentheses. All times are in Eastern Time.
