= Dave Paulsen =

American college basketball coach (born 1964)

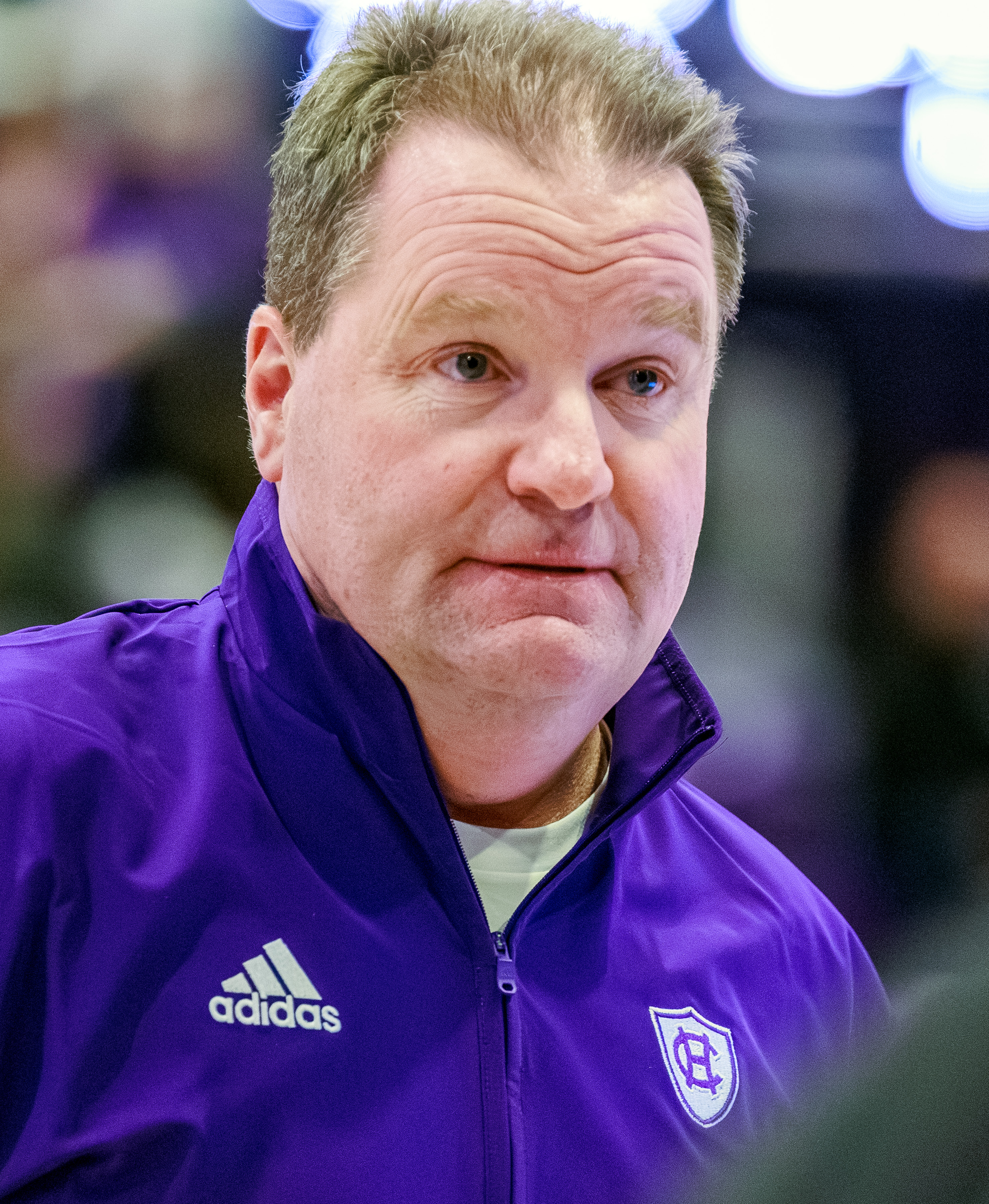
- Paulsen in 2025

Current position
- Title: Head coach
- Team: Holy Cross
- Conference: Patriot League
- Record: 34–70 (.327)

Biographical details
- Born: September 14, 1964 (age 62)

Playing career
- 1983–1987: Williams

Coaching career (HC unless noted)
- 1988–1989: Williams (assistant)
- 1989–1990: Michigan (assistant)
- 1990–1994: Cleveland State (assistant)
- 1994–1997: St. Lawrence
- 1997–2000: Le Moyne
- 2000–2008: Williams
- 2008–2015: Bucknell
- 2015–2021: George Mason
- 2022–2023: Fordham (assistant)
- 2023–present: Holy Cross

Administrative career (AD unless noted)
- 2021–2022: Fordham (Special Adv.)

Head coaching record
- Overall: 525–375 (.583)
- Tournaments: 0–2 (NCAA D1); 11–5 (NCAA D3); 1–2 (NIT); 0–1 (CBI)

Accomplishments and honors

Championships
- NCAA Division III tournament (2003); 2 NCAA Division III Final Four (2003, 2004); UCAA regular season (1997); NNE10 regular season (1998); ECAC New England (2001); 2 NESCAC regular season (2003, 2004); 3 NESCAC tournament (2003, 2004, 2007); 4 Patriot League regular season (2011–2013, 2015); 2 Patriot League tournament (2011, 2013)

Awards
- 2× NABC D-III National Coach of the Year (2003, 2004); 2× NABC D-III New England Coach of the Year (1996, 2003); 2× UCAA Coach of the Year (1996, 1997); 3× NESCAC Coach of the Year (2003, 2004, 2007); 2× Patriot League Coach of the Year (2011, 2012)

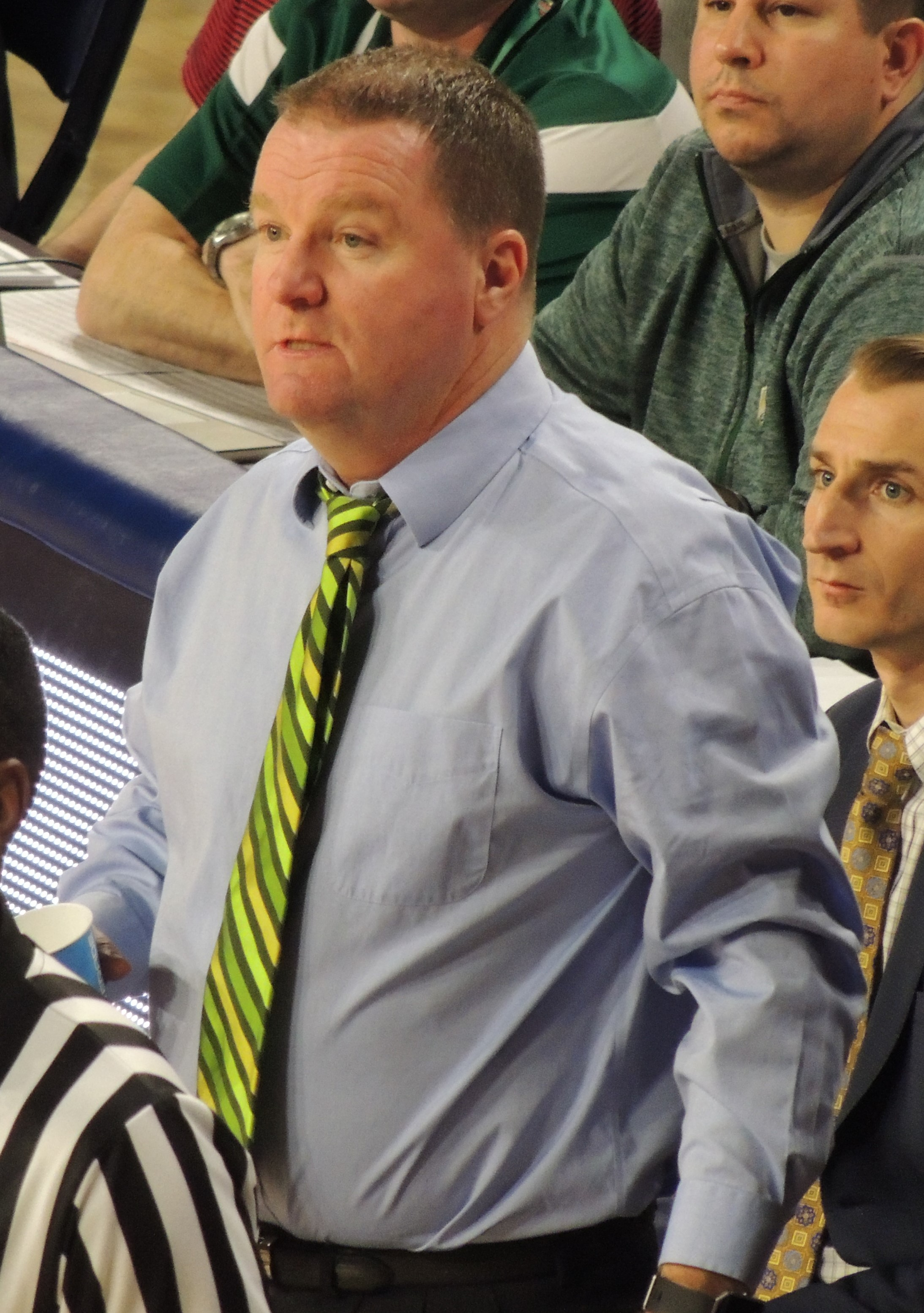
Paulsen at George Mason in 2018

Dave Paulsen (born September 14, 1964) is an American college basketball coach who is currently the head coach at Holy Cross. Previously, he was the head men's basketball coach at George Mason University in Fairfax, Virginia. Before arriving at George Mason, he was previously the head coach at Bucknell University for seven seasons. Prior to Bucknell, he spent eight years as the head coach at his alma mater, Williams College in Williamstown, Massachusetts, and also coached at St. Lawrence University in Canton, New York, and Le Moyne College in Syracuse, New York.

== Coaching career ==
At Williams College, Paulsen won the NCAA Division III title in 2003, and finished as national runner up in 2004. Paulsen was twice named Division III Coach of the Year during his time at Williams.

On May 20, 2008, Paulsen was hired as head coach at Bucknell. Paulsen led the Bison to a disappointing 7–23 record in his first year at Bucknell. This constituted the school's worst winning percentage (.233) since the 1971–72 season when the Bison posted a mark of 5–18 (.217). In his second year, the Bison improved to 12–17, including a 9–5 record in Patriot League play. In his third year, Paulsen was named Patriot League Coach of the Year en route to leading his team to a 25–8 record heading into the NCAA tournament, including a 13–1 record in the Patriot League, culminating in both the regular season and Patriot League tournament championships.

During his time at Bucknell, Paulsen recruited and coached future NBA player Mike Muscala.

On March 30, 2015, Paulsen was hired as head coach of George Mason. His team struggled in his first year, finishing the season with an overall record of 11–21, 5–13 in conference and in thirteenth place in the Atlantic 10. His second year at George Mason saw the team significantly improve, finishing 20–14 overall and 9–9 in A–10 play, and receiving an invitation to the 2017 CBI, where they would lose in the first round to Loyola (MD).

Paulsen returned to the Patriot League when he was appointed head coach at the College of the Holy Cross on March 28, 2023.

== Head coaching record ==
Record table
Season	Team	Overall	Conference	Standing	Postseason
St. Lawrence Saints (Upstate Collegiate Athletic Association) (1994–1997)
1994–95	St. Lawrence	10–15			
1995–96	St. Lawrence	18–9			NCAA Division III Second Round
1996–97	St. Lawrence	22–4		1st	NCAA Division III First Round
St. Lawrence:		50–28 (.641)			
Le Moyne Dolphins (Northeast-10 Conference) (1997–2000)
1997–98	Le Moyne	20–8	14–6	T–2nd	
1998–99	Le Moyne	13–14	8–10	T–6th	
1999–00	Le Moyne	9–17	2–16	10th	
Le Moyne:		42–39 (.519)	24–32 (.429)		
Williams Ephs (New England Small College Athletic Conference) (2000–2008)
2000–01	Williams	21–7	6–3	T–1st	
2001–02	Williams	22–6	7–2	2nd	NCAA Division III Second Round
2002–03	Williams	31–1	8–1	T–1st	NCAA Division III champion
2003–04	Williams	30–2	9–0	1st	NCAA Division III Runner-up
2004–05	Williams	16–9	4–5	T–5th	
2005–06	Williams	17–8	5–4	T–5th	
2006–07	Williams	16–12	6–3	T–3rd	NCAA Division III First Round
2007–08	Williams	17–8	4–5	T–6th	
Williams:		170–53 (.762)	49–23 (.681)		
Bucknell Bison (Patriot League) (2008–2015)
2008–09	Bucknell	7–23	4–10	T–7th	
2009–10	Bucknell	14–17	9–5	2nd	
2010–11	Bucknell	25–9	13–1	1st	NCAA Division I First Round
2011–12	Bucknell	25–10	12–2	1st	NIT Second Round
2012–13	Bucknell	28–6	12–2	1st	NCAA Division I First Round
2013–14	Bucknell	16–14	11–7	4th	
2014–15	Bucknell	19–15	13–5	1st	NIT First Round
Bucknell:		134–94 (.588)	60–88 (.405)		
George Mason Patriots (Atlantic 10 Conference) (2015–2021)
2015–16	George Mason	11–21	5–13	T–12th	
2016–17	George Mason	20–14	9–9	T–7th	CBI First Round
2017–18	George Mason	16–17	9–9	T–5th	
2018–19	George Mason	18–15	11–7	5th	
2019–20	George Mason	17–15	5–13	12th	
2020–21	George Mason	13–9	8–6	T–4th	
George Mason:		95–91 (.511)	46–54 (.460)		
Holy Cross Crusaders (Patriot League) (2023–present)
2023–24	Holy Cross	10–23	6–12	T–8th	
2024–25	Holy Cross	13–19	5–13	10th	
2025–26	Holy Cross	11–22	5–13	T-9th	
2026–27	Holy Cross	0–6	0–0		
Holy Cross:		34–70 (.327)	16–38 (.296)		
Total:		525–375 (.583)			
National champion Postseason invitational champion Conference regular season champion Conference regular season and conference tournament champion Division regular season champion Division regular season and conference tournament champion Conference tournament champion
