= 2010–11 Bucknell Bison men's basketball team =

American college basketball season

2010–11 Bucknell Bison men's basketball

Patriot League tournament champions Patriot League regular season champions

NCAA tournament, Round of 64
- Conference: Patriot League
- Record: 25–9 (13–1 Patriot)
- Head coach: Dave Paulsen (3rd season)
- Assistant coaches: Dane Fischer; Michael Cotton; Aaron Kelly
- Home arena: Sojka Pavilion

2010–11 Patriot League men's basketball standings
	Conf.				Overall
Team	W		L	PCT	W		L	PCT
Bucknell †	13	–	1	.929	25	–	9	.735
American	11	–	3	.786	22	–	9	.710
Holy Cross	7	–	7	.500	8	–	21	.276
Lehigh	6	–	8	.429	16	–	15	.516
Lafayette	6	–	8	.429	13	–	19	.406
Navy	6	–	8	.429	11	–	20	.355
Colgate	4	–	10	.286	7	–	23	.233
Army	3	–	11	.214	11	–	19	.367
† 2011 Patriot League tournament winner

The 2010–11 Bucknell Bison men's basketball team represented Bucknell University during the 2010–11 NCAA Division I men's basketball season. The Bison, led by third-year head coach Dave Paulsen, played their home games at Sojka Pavilion as members of the Patriot League. They finished the season 25–9, 13–1 in Patriot League play to be crowned regular season champions. They won the Patriot League Basketball tournament to receive an automatic bid to the NCAA tournament, where they lost to eventual National champion Connecticut in the Round of 64.

== Roster ==
2010–11 Bucknell Bison men's basketball team
Players
Coaches

Pos.	#	Name	Height	Weight	Year	Hometown
G	4	Bryan Cohen	6 ft 6 in (1.98 m)	210 lb (95 kg)	Jr	Huntingdon Valley, Pennsylvania
F	10	Brian Fitzpatrick (redshirt)	6 ft 8 in (2.03 m)	230 lb (104 kg)	So	Cheshire, Connecticut
F/C	31	Mike Muscala	6 ft 11 in (2.11 m)	230 lb (104 kg)	So	Roseville, Minnesota
G	42	Cameron Ayers	6 ft 5 in (1.96 m)	190 lb (86 kg)	Fr	Blue Bell, Pennsylvania

Head coach

- Dave Paulsen

Assistant coach(es)

Legend

- (C) Team captain
- (S) Suspended
- (I) Ineligible
- (W) Walk-on
- Injured
- Current redshirt

== Schedule ==
Date time, TV	Rank^{#}	Opponent^{#}	Result	Record	Site (attendance) city, state
Non-conference regular season
November 12, 2010*; 8:00 pm		at No. 6 Villanova	L 52–68	0–1	The Pavilion (6,500); Philadelphia, PA
November 14, 2010*; 2:00 pm		at Marquette; CBE Classic	L 61–72	0–2	Bradley Center (13,783); Milwaukee, WI
November 17, 2010*; 7:00 pm		Binghamton	W 66–38	1–2	Sojka Pavilion (2,489); Lewisburg, PA
November 20, 2010*; 7:00 pm		at Saint Francis (PA)	L 67–68	1–3	DeGol Arena (1,426); Loretto, PA
Nov 22, 2010*; 4:30 pm		vs. Presbyterian; CBE Classic	W 71–47	2–3	JMU Convocation Center (3,113); Harrisonburg, VA
November 23, 2010*; 4:30 pm		vs. Princeton; CBE Classic	L 55–66	2–4	JMU Convocation Center (3,084); Harrisonburg, VA
November 24, 2010*; 7:00 pm		at James Madison; CBE Classic	L 75–85	2–5	JMU Convocation Center (3,481); Harrisonburg, VA
November 29, 2010*; 7:00 pm		Wagner	L 73–77	2–6	Sojka Pavilion (1,963); Lewisburg, PA
December 1, 2010*; 7:00 pm		Columbia	W 73–68	3–6	Sojka Pavilion (1,849); Lewisburg, PA
December 4, 2010*; 7:00 pm		Boston University	W 52–49	4–6	Sojka Pavilion (2,765); Lewisburg, PA
December 17, 2010*; 7:00 pm		at La Salle	W 89–77	5–6	Tom Gola Arena (1,305); Philadelphia, PA
December 20, 2010*; 7:00 pm		at Cornell	W 75–64	6–6	Newman Arena (2,605); Ithaca, NY
December 22, 2010*; 7:00 pm		at Boston College	L 80–84	6–7	Silvio O. Conte Forum (4,118); Boston, MA
December 28, 2010*; 7:00 pm		at Loyola (MD)	W 70–59	7–7	Reitz Arena (783); Baltimore, MD
December 30, 2010*; 7:00 pm		Dartmouth	W 74–57	8–7	Sojka Pavilion (3,176); Lewisburg, PA
January 2, 2011*; 4:00 pm		at Richmond	W 62–61	9–7	Robins Center (5,426); Richmond, VA
Patriot League regular season
January 8, 2011; 8:00 pm, CBS College Sports		at Navy	W 71–64	10–7 (1–0)	Alumni Hall (3,818); Annapolis, MD
January 12, 2011; 7:30 pm		at American	W 75–60	11–7 (2–0)	Bender Arena (2,520); Washington, D.C.
January 16, 2011; 2:00 pm, CBS College Sports		Holy Cross	W 74–72	12–7 (3–0)	Sojka Pavilion (3,317); Lewisburg, PA
January 19, 2011; 7:00 pm		Lafayette	W 75–56	13–7 (4–0)	Sojka Pavilion (2,935); Lewisburg, PA
January 22, 2011; 7:00 pm		Colgate	W 76–49	14–7 (5–0)	Sojka Pavilion (3,827); Lewisburg, PA
January 26, 2011; 7:00 pm		at Lehigh	W 81–68	15–7 (6–0)	Stabler Arena (555); Bethlehem, PA
January 29, 2011; 4:00 pm		at Army	L 70–90	15–8 (6–1)	Christl Arena (1,072); West Point, NY
February 5, 2011; 7:00 pm		Navy	W 75–49	16–8 (7–1)	Sojka Pavilion (3,773); Lewisburg, PA
February 9, 2011; 7:00 pm		American	W 66–60	17–8 (8–1)	Sojka Pavilion (3,114); Lewisburg, PA
February 12, 2011; 3:30 pm		at Holy Cross	W 60–56	18–8 (9–1)	Hart Center (3,624); Worcestr, MA
February 16, 2011; 7:00 pm		at Lafayette	W 74–69 ^{OT}	19–8 (10–1)	Kirby Sports Center (1,944); Easton, PA
February 20, 2011; 2:00 pm		at Colgate	W 77–69	20–8 (11–1)	Cotterell Court (1,013); Hamilton, NY
February 23, 2011; 7:00 pm		Lehigh	W 72–55	21–8 (12–1)	Sojka Pavilion (3,014); Lewisburg, PA
February 26, 2011*; 4:00 pm		Army	W 78–64	22–8 (13–1)	Sojka Pavilion (4,148); Lewisburg, PA
2011 Patriot League tournament
March 2, 2011*; 7:00 pm		Army; Quarterfinals	W 78–51	23–8	Sojka Pavilion (3,192); Lewisburg, PA
March 6, 2011*; 7:30 pm, CBS College Sports		Lehigh; Semifinals	W 66–64	24–8	Sojka Pavilion (4,029); Lewisburg, PA
March 11, 2011*; 4:45 pm, ESPN2		Lafayette; Championship Game	W 72–57	25–8	Sojka Pavilion (4,271); Lewisburg, PA
2011 NCAA tournament
March 17, 2011*; 7:20 pm, TNT	(14 W)	vs. (3 W) No. 9 Connecticut; First Round	L 52–81	25–9	Verizon Center (17,706); Washington, D.C.
*Non-conference game. ^{#}Rankings from AP Poll. (#) Tournament seedings in parentheses. W=West. All times are in Eastern Time.
