= 2011 Patriot League men's basketball tournament =

- Classification: Division I
- Season: 2010–11
- Teams: 8
- Site: campus sites
- Champions: Bucknell (3rd title)
- Winning coach: Dave Paulsen (1st title)
- MVP: Mike Muscala (Bucknell)
- Television: CBS College Sports (Qtr & Semifinals), ESPN2 (champ. game)

2010–11 Patriot League men's basketball standings
	Conf.				Overall
Team	W		L	PCT	W		L	PCT
Bucknell †	13	–	1	.929	25	–	9	.735
American	11	–	3	.786	22	–	9	.710
Holy Cross	7	–	7	.500	8	–	21	.276
Lehigh	6	–	8	.429	16	–	15	.516
Lafayette	6	–	8	.429	13	–	19	.406
Navy	6	–	8	.429	11	–	20	.355
Colgate	4	–	10	.286	7	–	23	.233
Army	3	–	11	.214	11	–	19	.367
† 2011 Patriot League tournament winner

The 2011 Patriot League men's basketball tournament was held in early March 2011, with the quarterfinals occurring March 2, semi-finals on March 6, and the championship game on March 11. The games were played at campus sites for the highest-seeded team playing in the game. In the championship game, Bucknell beat Lafayette at home to win its third Patriot League men's basketball championship. Bucknell also received an automatic bid to the NCAA tournament, where it lost to eventual national champion Connecticut in the first round.

== Bracket ==
Quarterfinals; March 2
1	Bucknell	78
8	Army	51
4	Lehigh	87
5	Navy	75
3	Holy Cross	70
6	Lafayette	77
2	American	69
7	Colgate	53

Semifinals; March 6
1	Bucknell	66
4	Lehigh	64
6	Lafayette	73*
2	American	71

Championship; March 11
1	Bucknell	72
6	Lafayette	57

* denotes game ended in overtime.
