= 2011 MAAC men's basketball tournament =

- Classification: Division I
- Season: 2010–11
- Teams: 10
- Site: Webster Bank Arena at Harbor Yard; Bridgeport, Connecticut
- Champions: Saint Peter's (3rd title)
- Winning coach: John Dunne (1st title)
- MVP: Jeron Belin (Saint Peter's)
- Television: MSG, MSG+, ESPNU, ESPN2

2010–11 MAAC men's basketball standings
	Conf.				Overall
Team	W		L	PCT	W		L	PCT
Fairfield	15	–	3	.833	25	–	8	.758
Iona	13	–	5	.722	25	–	12	.676
Rider	13	–	5	.722	23	–	11	.676
Saint Peter's †	11	–	7	.611	20	–	14	.588
Loyola (MD)	10	–	8	.556	15	–	15	.500
Canisius	9	–	9	.500	15	–	15	.500
Siena	8	–	10	.444	13	–	18	.419
Niagara	5	–	13	.278	9	–	23	.281
Marist	3	–	15	.167	6	–	27	.182
Manhattan	3	–	15	.167	6	–	25	.194
† 2011 MAAC tournament winner Rankings from AP Poll

The 2011 Metro Atlantic Athletic Conference men's basketball tournament took place from March 4–7, 2011 at the Webster Bank Arena in Bridgeport, Connecticut. The tournament was won by Saint Peter's to be crowned with the Metro Atlantic Athletic Conference championship and the conference's automatic bid into the 2011 NCAA tournament.

== Bracket ==
First round Friday, March 4
8	Niagara	61
9	Marist	73
7	Siena	68
10	Manhattan	66

Quarterfinals; Saturday, March 5
1	Fairfield	55
9	Marist	31
5	Loyola (MD)	60
4	Saint Peter's	70
2	Iona	94
7	Siena	64
6	Canisius	64
3	Rider	79

Semifinals; Sunday, March 6
1	Fairfield	48
4	Saint Peter's	62
2	Iona	83
3	Rider	59

Final; Monday, March 7
4	Saint Peter's	62
2	Iona	57

* denotes overtime game
