= Chuck Martin (basketball) =

Puerto Rican basketball player-coach

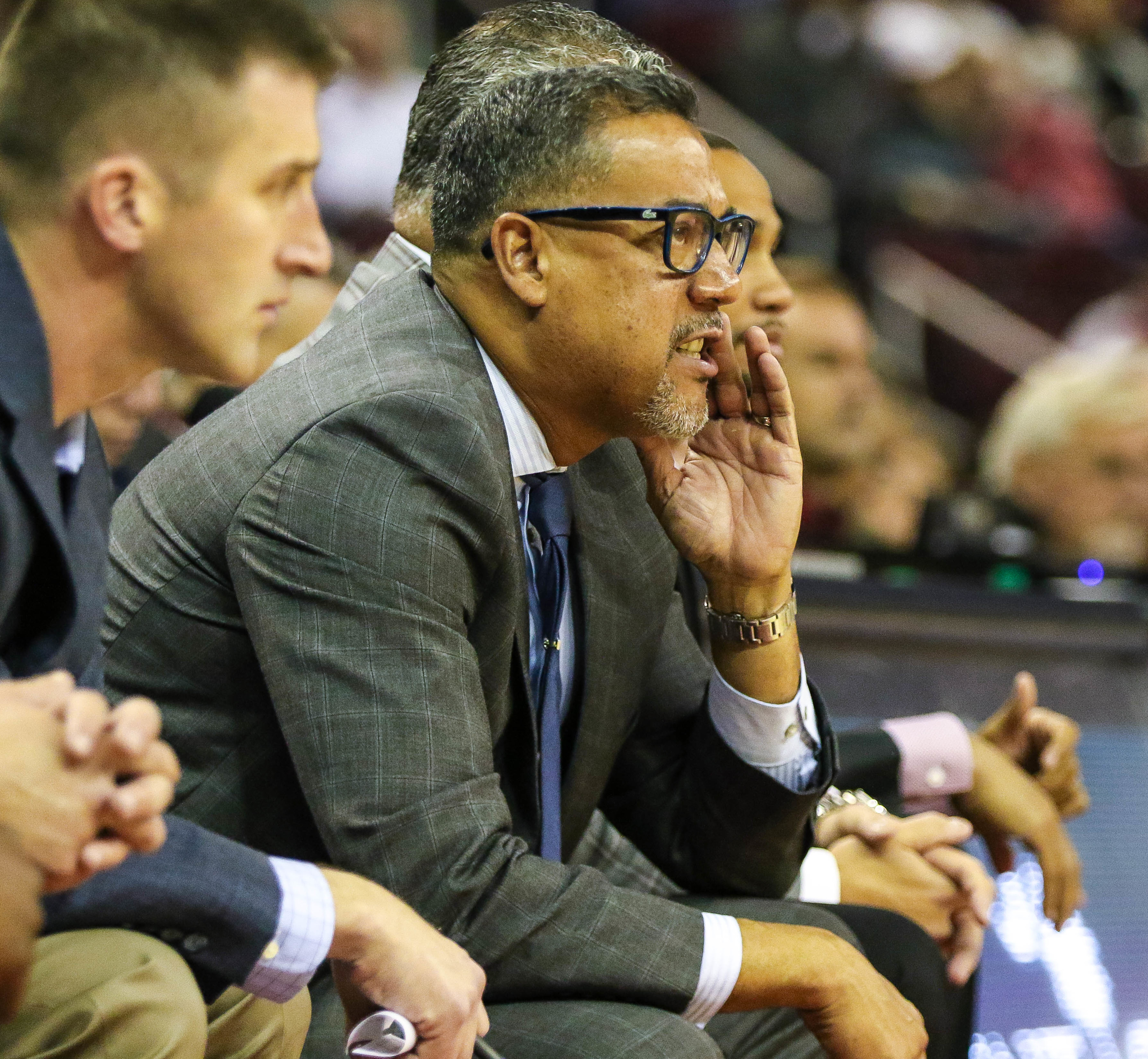
- Martin in November 2019

Current position
- Title: Associate head coach
- Team: North Carolina
- Conference: ACC

Biographical details
- Born: June 28, 1969 (age 57); San Juan, Puerto Rico, U.S.
- Education: Monmouth University

Coaching career (HC unless noted)
- 1999–2000: Manhattan (assistant)
- 2000–2001: UMass (assistant)
- 2001–2004: Drexel (assistant)
- 2004–2006: St. John's (assistant)
- 2006–2008: Memphis (assistant)
- 2008–2013: Marist
- 2014–2017: Indiana (assistant)
- 2017–2021: South Carolina (assistant)
- 2021–2022: South Carolina (associate)
- 2022–2023: Oregon (assistant)
- 2023–2024: Kentucky (assistant)
- 2024–2026: Arkansas (assistant)
- 2026–present: North Carolina (associate HC)

Head coaching record
- Overall: 41–118 (.258)

José Luis "Chuck" Martín is a Puerto Rican college basketball coach who is an assistant coach at the University of North Carolina. Martin was head coach at Marist College from 2008 to 2013.

== Basketball career ==
As a basketball player, Martin played for the Capitanes de Arecibo of the Baloncesto Superior Nacional (BSN) for five seasons. He was coached by Raymond Dalmau, from whom he learned to be honest with his players, and his assistant Carlos Calcaño whom he credits as a source of inspirational quotes. Players like Eddie Casiano and Javier Antonio Colón impressed Martin as opponents.

== Collegiate coaching career (1998–present) ==
=== Marist (2008–2013) ===
After going 41–118 in five seasons as head coach, Martin was fired from Marist.

=== South Carolina (2017–2022) ===
Martin joined Frank Martin's staff at South Carolina. Martin was promoted to associate head coach prior to the 2021–22 season.

=== Oregon (2022–2023) ===
After his tenure at South Carolina, Martin joined head coach Dana Altman's staff at Oregon in April 2022.

=== Kentucky (2023–2024) ===
Martin left Oregon in July 2023 to serve as an assistant coach and recruiting coordinator at Kentucky under John Calipari. Martin had been an assistant for Calipari at Memphis prior to his stint as head coach at Marist.

=== Arkansas (2024–2026) ===
When John Calipari left Kentucky for Arkansas in the 2024 offseason, Martin joined his staff in Fayetteville and continued as an assistant and recruiting specialist for the Razorbacks.

=== North Carolina (2026–Present) ===
Incoming Tar Heels head coach Michael Malone named Martin as associate head coach in April 2026. Martin and Malone had served together as assistant coaches at Manhattan for the 1999-2000 season.

== Head coaching record ==
Record table
Season	Team	Overall	Conference	Standing	Postseason
Marist (Metro Atlantic Athletic Conference) (2008–2013)
2008–09	Marist	10–23	4–14	T–9th	
2009–10	Marist	1–29	1–17	10th	
2010–11	Marist	6–27	3–15	T–9th	
2011–12	Marist	14–17	7–11	8th	
2012–13	Marist	10–21	6–12	8th	
Total:		41–117			
National champion Postseason invitational champion Conference regular season champion Conference regular season and conference tournament champion Division regular season champion Division regular season and conference tournament champion Conference tournament champion

== Personal life ==
Martin was born in San Juan, Puerto Rico, from where his family relocated to New York. His original nickname was in Spanish, "Che", which eventually became "Chuck" because the English speakers couldn't pronounce it properly. Likewise his actual last name, Martín, has an accent but its pronunciation became anglicized to "Martin". When presenting himself, he does so as José Luis Martín and identifies as Puerto Rican.

Martin is a 1993 graduate of Monmouth University with a bachelor's degree in communications. He and his wife, Lee, have three children. Martin retains links with the island to this day, taking his son to a tryout for the juvenile Puerto Rico national team in 2019. He has expressed his interest in joining the program, which he cites as a source of great pride.

== See also ==
- Arkansas Profile
- Kentucky Profile
- Oregon Profile
- Indiana Profile
- Marist Profile
