= Anthony Myles (basketball, born 1992) =

American basketball player

KW Titans
- Position: Guard
- League: NBL Canada

Personal information
- Born: June 16, 1992 (age 34) Dover, Delaware, U.S.
- Listed height: 6 ft 5 in (1.96 m)
- Listed weight: 205 lb (93 kg)

Career information
- High school: Polytechnic (Woodside, Delaware)
- College: Rider (2010–2014)
- NBA draft: 2014: undrafted
- Playing career: 2014–present

Career history
- 2014–2015: Victoria Libertas Pesaro
- 2015–2016: Alba Fehérvár
- 2016: Tigers Tübingen
- 2016–2017: Soproni
- 2018–present: KW Titans

Anthony Myles (born June 16, 1992) is an American professional basketball player who currently plays for KW Titans of the NBL Canada.

== Career ==
After playing high school basketball at Polytechnic High School (Woodside, Delaware). Myles played 4 seasons of college basketball at the Rider University, with the Rider Broncs.

Myles went undrafted in the 2014 NBA draft. In July 2014, he signed his first professional contract with Victoria Libertas Pesaro of Italy. After one season at Victoria Libertas Pesaro, he followed Peter Lorant and signed with Alba Fehérvár of the Hungarian National Championship.

On September 1, 2016, Myles signed with German club Tigers Tübingen for the 2016–17 season. On November 4, 2016, he parted ways with Tübingen after appearing in seven games. On December 19, 2016, he signed with Hungarian club Soproni KC for the rest of the season.
