= John Dunne (basketball) =

American basketball player-coach

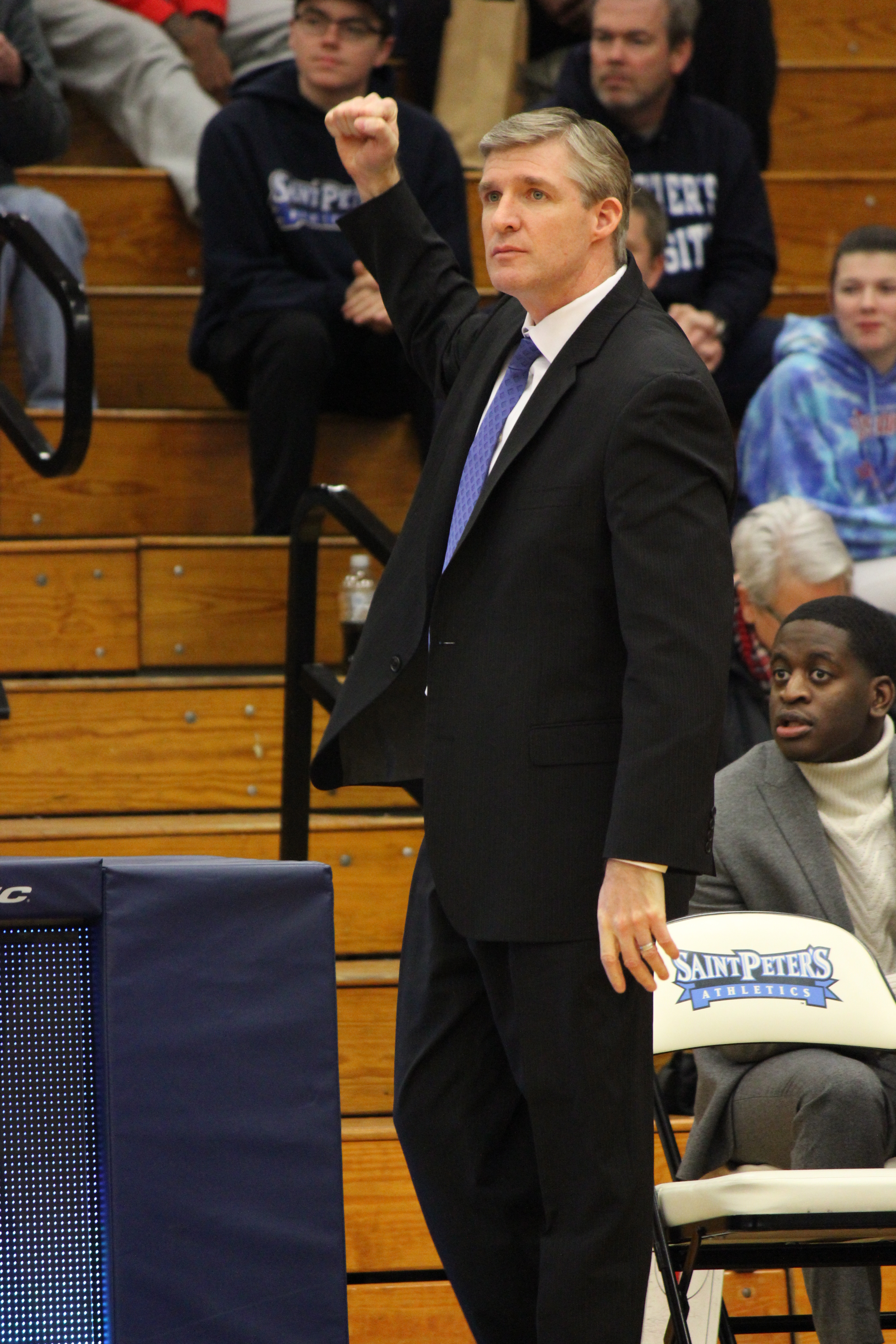

Current position
- Title: Head coach
- Team: Marist
- Conference: MAAC
- Record: 117–125 (.483)

Biographical details
- Born: June 11, 1970 (age 56); Queens, New York, U.S.
- Education: Ithaca College

Playing career
- 1988–1992: Ithaca

Coaching career (HC unless noted)
- 1992–1994: Wilkes (assistant)
- 1994–1995: Western Michigan (assistant)
- 1995–1996: Wilkes (assistant)
- 1996–1998: Adelphi (assistant)
- 1998–1999: Manhattan (assistant)
- 1999–2001: Siena (assistant)
- 2001–2006: Seton Hall (assistant)
- 2006–2018: Saint Peter's
- 2018–present: Marist

Head coaching record
- Overall: 270–350 (.435)
- Tournaments: 0–1 (NCAA Division I); 4–0 (CIT); 9–15 (MAAC)

Accomplishments and honors

Championships
- CIT (2017); MAAC tournament (2011)

John Dunne (born June 11, 1970) is an American college basketball coach and current head men's basketball coach at Marist College.

He was previously an assistant coach at Adelphi University under Steve Clifford and at Seton Hall University under Louis Orr. He also served as an assistant coach at Siena College.

Dunne was born in Queens, New York and attended Archbishop Molloy High School, where he also played basketball. He played at the collegiate level at Ithaca College.

Dunne was hired by Saint Peter's University as their men's basketball coach in 2006. While at Saint Peter's, he became the first coach in MAAC history to bring a No. 9 seed to the semifinals of the MAAC tournament, when Saint Peter's University beat No. 1 seeded Rider University 66–55 on March 2, 2018.

On April 3, 2018, Dunne was hired as the new coach for Marist College.

== Head coaching record ==
Record table
Season	Team	Overall	Conference	Standing	Postseason
Saint Peter's Peacocks (Metro Atlantic Athletic Conference) (2006–2018)
2006–07	Saint Peter's	5–25	3–15	9th	
2007–08	Saint Peter's	6–24	3–15	9th	
2008–09	Saint Peter's	11–19	8–10	6th	
2009–10	Saint Peter's	16–14	11–7	4th	
2010–11	Saint Peter's	20–14	11–7	4th	NCAA Division I Round of 64
2011–12	Saint Peter's	5–26	4–14	9th	
2012–13	Saint Peter's	9–21	3–15	10th	
2013–14	Saint Peter's	14–17	9–11	6th	
2014–15	Saint Peter's	16–18	8–12	7th	
2015–16	Saint Peter's	14–16	12–8	T–4th	
2016–17	Saint Peter's	23–13	14–6	2nd	CIT champion
2017–18	Saint Peter's	14–18	6–12	9th	
Saint Peter's Peacocks:		153–225 (.405)	92–132 (.411)		
Marist Red Foxes (Metro Atlantic Athletic Conference) (2018–2026)
2018–19	Marist	12–19	7–11	8th	
2019–20	Marist	7–23	6–14	11th	
2020–21	Marist	12–9	10–8	T–3rd	
2021–22	Marist	14–16	9–11	T–5th	
2022–23	Marist	13–20	6–14	11th	
2023–24	Marist	18–13	12–8	T–3rd	
2024–25	Marist	20–10	13–7	3rd	
2025–26	Marist	19–12	12–8	T–4th	
Marist Red Foxes (Metro Conference) (2026–present)
2026–27	Marist	2–3	0–0		
Marist Red Foxes:		117–125 (.483)	75–81 (.481)		
Total:		270–350 (.435)			
National champion Postseason invitational champion Conference regular season champion Conference regular season and conference tournament champion Division regular season champion Division regular season and conference tournament champion Conference tournament champion
