= 2010–11 Lehigh Mountain Hawks men's basketball team =

American college basketball season

2010–11 Lehigh Mountain Hawks men's basketball
- Conference: Patriot League
- Record: 16-15 (6-8 Patriot)
- Head coach: Brett Reed (4th season)
- Assistant coaches: Matt Logie; Antoni Wyche; Damion Jablonski
- Home arena: Stabler Arena

The 2010–11 Lehigh Mountain Hawks men's basketball team represented Lehigh University during the 2010–11 NCAA Division I men's basketball season.

2010–11 Patriot League men's basketball standings
	Conf.				Overall
Team	W		L	PCT	W		L	PCT
Bucknell †	13	–	1	.929	25	–	9	.735
American	11	–	3	.786	22	–	9	.710
Holy Cross	7	–	7	.500	8	–	21	.276
Lehigh	6	–	8	.429	16	–	15	.516
Lafayette	6	–	8	.429	13	–	19	.406
Navy	6	–	8	.429	11	–	20	.355
Colgate	4	–	10	.286	7	–	23	.233
Army	3	–	11	.214	11	–	19	.367
† 2011 Patriot League tournament winner

== Roster ==
2010–11 Lehigh Mountain Hawks men's basketball team roster
Name	Number	Class	Position	Height (feet and inches)	Weight (lbs)	Hometown	Per Game Summary
C.J. McCollum	3	Sophomore	Guard	6'3"	180	Canton, OH	21.8 Pts, 7.8 Reb, 2.1 Ast
Gabe Knutson	42	Sophomore	Forward	6'9"	220	Urbandale, IA	12.2 Pts, 5.7 Reb, 0.5 Ast
Michael Ojo	23	Senior	Guard	6'5"	200	Santa Monica, CA	10.9 Pts, 4.2 Reb, 0.9 Ast
Mackey McKnight	11	Freshman	Guard	6'0"	170	New Orleans, LA	7.6 Pts, 2.3 Reb, 3.7 Ast
Holden Greiner	20	Sophomore	Forward	6'8"	215	Traverse City, MI	6.4 Pts, 4.3 Reb, 0.7 Ast
Jordan Hamilton	44	Junior	Forward	6'6"	205	Seattle, WA	5.0 Pts, 1.9 Reb, 0.4 Ast
Prentice Small	5	Senior	Guard	5'9"	190	North Babylon, NY	3.0 Pts, 1.3 Reb, 2.9 Ast
Rob Keefer	15	Senior	Guard	6'3"	185	North Wales, PA	2.7 Pts, 1.2 Reb, 0.2 Ast
Anthony D'Orazio	10	Freshman	Guard	6'2"	185	Camden, NJ	2.4 Pts, 1.1 Reb, 0.3 Ast
David Safstrom	40	Senior	Center	7'1"	250	Everett, WA	1.5 Pts, 1.8 Reb, 0.2 Ast
Kevin McCarthy	33	Freshman	Center	6'10"	260	St. Clair Shores, MI	1.5 Pts, 0.8 Reb, 0.1 Ast
John Adams	4	Junior	Forward	6'6"	225	Cupertino, CA	1.4 Pts, 1.2 Reb, 0.3 Ast
Justin Maneri	31	Junior	Center	6'8"	240	Saddle Brook, NJ	1.3 Pts, 1.7 Reb, 0.3 Ast
Cory Goodman	21	Sophomore	Guard	6'1"	160	Philadelphia, PA	0.0 Pts, 0.3 Reb, 0.3 Ast
Corey Huerta	35	Sophomore	Guard	5'9"	150	North Catasauqua, PA	0.0 Pts, 0.0 Reb, 0.0 Ast
Bryant Reams	32	Sophomore	Guard	6'2"	170	Memphis, TN	0.0 Pts, 0.5 Reb, 0.0 Ast

== Coaching staff ==
Position	Name
Head Coach	Brett Reed
Associate Head Coach	Matt Logie
Assistant Coach	Antoni Wyche
Assistant Coach	Damion Jablonski
Director of Basketball Operations	T.J. Jordan
